= 2010–11 Frölunda HC season =

Swedish ice hockey club season

2010–11 Frölunda HC
- League: 9th Elitserien
- 2010–11 record: 19–24–12
- Home record: 13–8–6
- Road record: 6–16–6
- Goals for: 128
- Goals against: 158

Team information
- General manager: Kent Johansson
- Coach: Kent Johansson
- Assistant coach: Stephan Lundh
- Captain: Joel Lundqvist
- Alternate captains: Per-Johan Axelsson; Riku Hahl
- Arena: Scandinavium
- Average attendance: 9,378

Team leaders
- Goals: Mika Pyörälä (14)
- Assists: Niklas Andersson (30)
- Points: Niklas Andersson (44)
- Penalty minutes: Christoph Schubert (49)
- Goals against average: Joakim Lundström (2.56)

The 2010–11 Elitserien season was Frölunda HC's 31st season in Elitserien. The regular season started on September 17, 2010 away against Timrå IK and ended on March 5, 2011 away against Luleå HF.

The 2010–11 season was Frölunda's worst season in four years. For the first time since 2007, Frölunda finished 9th in the regular season and thus missed the following playoffs. With just a few rounds of the regular season left, Frölunda were expected by many hockey experts to finish 11th or 12th in the regular season and thus be forced to play in Kvalserien. However, Frölunda won the last three games and thus stayed in Elitserien without having to play in Kvalserien.

== Pre-season ==
On April 13 it was reported that Ulf Dahlén, who had one year left on his contract, was relieved of his duties as head coach. The decision was officially announced the following day. Dahlén was offered to continue working as part of the coaching staff as an assistant coach, but declined the offer. Kent Johansson was announced as new head coach on April 21. In May Stephan Lundh, who joined the coaching staff in late January 2010 to aid Dahlén, signed a one-year contract to work as an assistant coach to Johansson.

=== European Trophy ===
2010 European Trophy game log

Group stage: 3–2–3 (Home: 2–1–1; Away: 1–1–2)
Round	Date	Opponent	Score	Goaltender	Venue	Attendance	Record	Pts
1	August 11	Malmö	2–1	Lundström	Malmö Arena	1,270	1–0–0	3
2	August 12	HV71	1–8	Holmqvist	Frölundaborg	3,020	1–1–0	3
3	August 18	EC Red Bull Salzburg	5–4	Holmqvist	Eisarena Salzburg	1,308	1–1–1	5
4	August 20	ZSC Lions	3–4	Lundström	Hallenstadion	599	1–1–2	6
5	August 21	SC Bern	2–3	Holmqvist	PostFinance Arena	801	1–2–2	6
6	August 25	Tappara	4–1	Holmqvist	Borås Ishall		2–2–2	9
7	August 27	TPS	7–6	Lundström	Kungsbacka Ishall	1,567	2–2–3	11
8	August 28	Kärpät	7–4	Holmqvist	Oasen	453	3–2–3	14

Legend: Win Overtime/Shootout win (2 points) Loss (0 points) Overtime/Shootout loss (1 point)

=== Exhibition games ===
Exhibition games log

Exhibition games: 1–2–0 (Home: 0–1–0; Away: 1–1–0)
Date	Opponent	Score	Goaltender	Venue	Attendance
August 7	Sparta Sarpsborg	3–1	Holmqvist/Lundström	Sparta Amfi	2,020
September 8	Linköping	2–3	Lundström	Frölundaborg	1,357
September 12	HV71	4–5	Lundström	Kinnarps Arena	6,200

Legend: Win Loss Tie

== Regular season ==
=== Standings ===
2010–11 Elitserien season	GP	W	L	OTW/SOW	OTL/SOL	GF	GA	Pts
HV71^{y}	55	24	16	9	6	173	143	96
Färjestads BK^{x}	55	27	19	6	3	154	124	96
Skellefteå AIK^{x}	55	25	18	9	3	173	145	96
Luleå HF^{x}	55	23	21	8	3	129	115	88
Linköpings HC^{x}	55	22	19	5	9	138	118	85
Djurgårdens IF^{x}	55	22	19	4	10	140	139	84
Brynäs IF^{x}	55	19	20	8	8	147	157	81
AIK^{x}	55	20	23	4	8	131	151	76
Frölunda HC^{e}	55	19	24	5	7	128	158	74
Timrå IK^{e}	55	17	25	9	4	140	165	73
Södertälje SK^{r}	55	20	26	2	7	132	164	71
Modo Hockey^{r}	55	17	25	6	7	147	153	70

x – clinched playoff spot; y – clinched regular season league title; e – eliminated from playoff contention; r – will play in relegation series

=== Games log ===
2010–11 Elitserien games log; 19–24–12 (Home: 13–8–6; Away: 6–17–6)

September: 1–1–3 (Home: 0–0–2; Away: 1–1–1)
Round	Date	Opponent	Score	Goaltender	Venue	Attendance	Record	Pts
1	September 17	Timrå IK	2–6	Holmqvist	E.ON Arena	5,208	0–1–0	0
2	September 21	AIK IF	0–1 (OT)	Holmqvist	Scandinavium	9,198	0–1–1	1
3	September 23	Färjestads BK	3–2	Holmqvist	Löfbergs Lila Arena	7,410	1–1–1	4
4	September 25	Brynäs IF	4–3 (SO)	Holmqvist	Scandinavium	9,043	1–1–2	6
5	September 30	HV71	1–2 (OT)	Lundström	Kinnarps Arena	6,853	1–1–3	7

October: 2–8–2 (Home: 2–3–2; Away: 0–4–0)
Round	Date	Opponent	Score	Goaltender	Venue	Attendance	Record	Pts
6	October 2	Södertälje SK	1–2 (OT)	Lundström	Scandinavium	10,105	1–1–4	8
7	October 5	Modo Hockey	0–6	Lundström	Fjällräven Center	5,539	1–2–4	8
8	October 7	Linköpings HC	2–1 (SO)	Holmqvist	Scandinavium	7,501	1–2–5	10
9	October 9	Luleå HF	0–3	Holmqvist	Coop Norrbotten Arena	5,721	1–3–5	10
10	October 14	Skellefteå AIK	2–3	Holmqvist	Scandinavium	7,578	1–4–5	10
11	October 16	Djurgårdens IF	2–3	Lundström	Hovet	7,767	1–5–5	10
12	October 21	Timrå IK	3–5	Lundström	Scandinavium	7,622	1–6–5	10
13	October 23	Modo Hockey	3–0	Holmqvist	Scandinavium	9,074	2–6–5	13
14	October 26	Djurgårdens IF	3–0	Holmqvist	Scandinavium	10,003	3–6–5	16
15	October 28	Skellefteå AIK	1–3	Holmqvist	Skellefteå Kraft Arena	4,435	3–7–5	16
16	October 30	HV71	3–4	Holmqvist	Scandinavium	11,158	3–8–5	16

November: 5–4–1 (Home: 2–1–0; Away: 3–3–1)
Round	Date	Opponent	Score	Goaltender	Venue	Attendance	Record	Pts
17	November 1	AIK	2–5	Holmqvist	Hovet	4,083	3–9–5	16
18	November 4	Luleå HF	3–1	Holmqvist	Scandinavium	9,991	4–9–5	19
19	November 6	Brynäs IF	4–3	Holmqvist	Läkerol Arena	8,322	5–9–5	22
26	November 16	Skellefteå AIK	0–3	Holmqvist	Scandinavium	8,460	5–10–5	22
20	November 18	Södertälje SK	2–5	Holmqvist	AXA Sports Center	3,268	5–11–5	22
21	November 20	Färjestads BK	3–1	Holmqvist	Löfbergs Lila Arena	8,505	6–11–5	25
22	November 23	Linköpings HC	1–6	Holmqvist	Cloetta Center	5,976	6–12–5	25
23	November 25	Djurgårdens IF	5–4 (SO)	Lundström	Hovet	6,267	6–12–6	27
24	November 27	AIK	4–3	Holmqvist	Scandinavium	9,004	7–12–6	30
25	November 29	Luleå HF	4–2	Holmqvist	Coop Norrbotten Arena	4,373	8–12–6	33

December: 3–3–2 (Home: 3–1–0; Away: 0–2–2)
Round	Date	Opponent	Score	Goaltender	Venue	Attendance	Record	Pts
27	December 4	HV71	4–3 (SO)	Holmqvist	Kinnarps Arena	7,000	8–12–7	35
37	December 5	HV71	2–4	Holmqvist	Scandinavium	9,053	8–13–7	35
28	December 7	Södertälje SK	2–1 (OT)	Lundström	AXA Sports Center	3,069	8–13–8	37
29	December 9	Modo Hockey	3–1	Lundström	Scandinavium	8,426	9–13–8	40
30	December 11	Linköpings HC	2–1	Holmqvist	Scandinavium	9,513	10–13–8	43
31	December 26	Färjestads BK	2–5	Holmqvist	Karlstad Outdoor Arena	15,274	10–14–8	43
32	December 28	Brynäs IF	3–2	Lundström	Scandinavium	11,477	11–14–8	46
33	December 30	Timrå IK	2–5	Lundström	E.ON Arena	4,569	11–15–8	46

January: 4–4–2 (Home: 3–2–1; Away: 1–2–1)
Round	Date	Opponent	Score	Goaltender	Venue	Attendance	Record	Pts
34	January 2	Södertälje SK	4–0	Holmqvist	Scandinavium	8,348	12–15–8	49
35	January 4	Luleå HF	3–4 (OT)	Holmqvist	Scandinavium	8,570	12–15–9	50
36	January 6	Brynäs IF	1–2	Holmqvist	Läkerol Arena	4,701	12–16–9	50
38	January 13	Skellefteå AIK	4–5 (OT)	Holmqvist	Skellefteå Kraft Arena	4,584	12–16–10	51
39	January 16	AIK	2–1	Holmqvist	Hovet	3,764	13–16–10	54
40	January 20	Modo Hockey	0–4	Holmqvist	Fjällräven Center	5,453	13–17–10	54
41	January 22	Linköpings HC	5–1	Holmqvist	Scandinavium	8,888	14–17–10	57
42	January 24	Djurgårdens IF	4–2	Holmqvist	Scandinavium	8,616	15–17–10	60
43	January 27	Timrå IK	2–5	Holmqvist	Scandinavium	8,034	15–18–10	60
44	January 29	Färjestads BK	0–3	Holmqvist	Scandinavium	12,026	15–19–10	60

February: 1–5–2 (Home: 1–1–1; Away: 0–4–1)
Round	Date	Opponent	Score	Goaltender	Venue	Attendance	Record	Pts
45	February 1	Södertälje SK	2–3	Lundström	AXA Sports Center	6,150	15–20–10	60
46	February 3	Brynäs IF	2–4	Holmqvist	Scandinavium	9,418	15–21–10	60
47	February 5	Timrå IK	2–4	Holmqvist/Lundström	E.ON Arena	5,011	15–22–10	60
48	February 17	AIK	1–2 (SO)	Holmqvist	Scandinavium	8,478	15–22–11	61
49	February 19	Skellefteå AIK	4–1	Holmqvist	Scandinavium	9,540	16–22–11	64
50	February 21	Djurgårdens IF	1–5	Holmqvist/Lundström	Hovet	7,206	16–23–11	64
51	February 24	HV71	3–4 (SO)	Lundström	Kinnarps Arena	6,973	16–23–12	65
52	February 26	Linköpings HC	2–3	Lundström	Cloetta Center	7,579	16–24–12	65

March: 3–0–0 (Home: 2–0–0; Away: 1–0–0)
Round	Date	Opponent	Score	Goaltender	Venue	Attendance	Record	Pts
53	March 1	Modo Hockey	3–2	Lundström	Scandinavium	12,044	17–24–12	68
54	March 3	Färjestads BK	4–3	Lundström	Scandinavium	12,044	18–24–12	71
55	March 5	Luleå HF	1–0	Lundström	Coop Norrbotten Arena	5,326	19–24–12	74

Legend: Win Overtime/Shootout win (2 points) Loss (0 points) Overtime/Shootout loss (1 point)

== Statistics ==
=== Skaters ===
Name	Pos	Nationality	GP	G	A	P	PIM
Name	Pos	Nationality	Regular season				
Niklas Andersson	LW	Sweden	53	14	30	44	30
Tomi Kallio	RW	Finland	55	12	18	30	36
Riku Hahl	C	Finland	47	4	20	24	14
Mika Pyörälä	C	Finland	47	14	9	23	8
Toni Koivisto	RW	Finland	54	14	9	23	12
Mikael Johansson	C	Sweden	55	8	12	20	24
Henrik Tömmernes	D	Sweden	47	3	17	20	24
Mikko Mäenpää	LW	Finland	46	8	10	18	46
Joel Lundqvist	C	Sweden	31	9	8	17	22
Christian Bäckman	D	Sweden	21	4	13	17	8
Jesper Mattsson	C	Sweden	23	7	8	15	8
Per-Johan Axelsson	LW	Sweden	50	4	10	14	41
Nicklas Lasu	LW	Sweden	54	7	6	13	24
Andreas Karlsson	C	Sweden	35	2	10	12	12
Oscar Hedman	D	Sweden	55	2	9	11	40
Robin Lindqvist	C	Sweden	45	4	4	8	20
Pavel Skrbek	D	Czech Republic	27	2	6	8	10
John Klingberg	D	Sweden	26	0	5	5	10
Ville Mäntymaa	D	Finland	46	3	1	4	18
Tobias Viklund	D	Sweden	55	2	2	4	36
Christoph Schubert	D	Germany	23	0	4	4	49
Carl Klingberg	RW	Sweden	38	2	1	3	12
William Wallén	RW	Sweden	12	1	0	1	0
Linus Fagemo	RW	Sweden	12	1	0	1	2
Johan Sundström	C	Sweden	41	1	0	1	10
Richard Demén-Willaume	D	Sweden	6	0	1	1	8
Johan Holmqvist	G	Sweden	53	0	1	1	2
Oliver Bohm	D	Sweden	1	0	0	0	0
Jonathan Sääf	G	Sweden	1	0	0	0	0
Henrik Lundberg	G	Sweden	2	0	0	0	0
Jannik Christensen	D	Denmark	2	0	0	0	0
Dragan Umicevic	RW	Sweden	3	0	0	0	0
Sebastian Collberg	RW	Sweden	5	0	0	0	0
Casper Carning	RW	Sweden	8	0	0	0	0
Viktor Svedberg	D	Sweden	9	0	0	0	0
Robin Dahse	LW	Sweden	10	0	0	0	0
Victor Backman	LW	Sweden	17	0	0	0	2
Peter Andersson	D	Sweden	27	0	0	0	8
Joakim Lundström	G	Sweden	54	0	0	0	2

== Transactions ==
The off-season started with the departure of Janne Niskala—who decided to pursue offers from the Kontinental Hockey League (KHL)—and Joakim Andersson, who signed a three-year entry-level contract with the Detroit Red Wings. Concurrently the club announced that Jens Karlsson and Martin Røymark were not offered new contracts, and that Mikael Johansson had signed a two-year contract extension. The following week Nicklas Lasu signed a one-year extension with Frölunda, and Patric Blomdahl decided to leave Frölunda to reunite with his junior club AIK which had been promoted back to Elitserien. In May Niklas Andersson decided to sign a one-year contract extension to play his fourteenth season for Frölunda, and goaltender Joakim Lundström was signed to a one-year contract. Later that month the club announced that Oscar Hedman had signed a one-year contract extension, and that Toni Koivisto, Mikko Mäenpää, and William Wallén had all signed two-year contracts with the club. Carl Klingberg and Peter Andersson signed entry-level contracts with the Atlanta Thrashers and Vancouver Canucks respectively, both with the intention of playing for Frölunda on a loan during the 2010–11 season. Prior to the June 15 deadline for NHL teams to sign contracted Elitserien players Frölunda had to say goodbye to their second and third best scorers from the 2009–10 season; Fredrik Pettersson and Mathis Olimb, who decided to try their luck in North America, Pettersson with the Atlanta Thrashers and Olimb with the Chicago Blackhawks. In late July Mika Pyörälä signed a three-year contract with Frölunda.

Acquired
Player	Former team	Date	Notes
Joakim Lundström	IF Sundsvall Hockey	May 7	
Toni Koivisto	Metallurg Magnitogorsk	May 20	
Mikko Mäenpää	HPK	May 20	
William Wallén	Mississauga St. Michael's Majors	May 20	
Mika Pyörälä	Philadelphia Flyers	July 29	
Christoph Schubert	Atlanta Thrashers	September 15	
Robin Lindqvist	Timrå IK	October 10	
Pavel Skrbek	Skellefteå AIK	November 3	
Jesper Mattsson	Malmö Redhawks	December 25	

Leaving
Player	New team	Date	Notes
Janne Niskala	Metallurg Magnitogorsk	April 9	
Joakim Andersson	Detroit Red Wings	April 9	
Jens Karlsson	Borås HC	April 12	
Martin Røymark	Timrå IK	April 12	
Patric Blomdahl	AIK	April 20	
Gusten Törnqvist	HC Alleghe	May 28	
Carl Klingberg	Atlanta Thrashers	May 31	
Peter Andersson	Vancouver Canucks	June 2	
Fredrik Pettersson	Atlanta Thrashers	June 14	
Mathis Olimb	Chicago Blackhawks	June 14	
Christoph Schubert	November 26	June 14	
Carl Klingberg	Timrå IK	January 29	

== Drafted players ==
Frölunda HC players picked in the 2011 NHL entry draft at the Xcel Energy Center in St. Paul, Minnesota.

Round	Pick	Player	Nationality	NHL team
2nd	50th	Johan Sundström	Sweden	New York Islanders
7th	200th	Michael Schumacher	Sweden	Los Angeles Kings
7th	210th	Henrik Tömmernes	Sweden	Vancouver Canucks
