= 2008–09 Frölunda HC season =

Swedish ice hockey club season

2008–09 Frölunda HC
- League: 3rd Elitserien
- 2008–09 record: 25–20–10
- Home record: 15–7–5
- Road record: 10–13–5
- Goals for: 144
- Goals against: 130

Team information
- General manager: Kent Norberg
- Coach: Ulf Dahlén
- Assistant coach: Janne Karlsson
- Captain: Niklas Andersson
- Alternate captains: Ronnie Sundin, Tomi Kallio and Riku Hahl
- Arena: Scandinavium
- Average attendance: 11,234

Team leaders
- Goals: Tomi Kallio (19)
- Assists: Riku Hahl (24)
- Points: Niklas Andersson (37)
- Penalty minutes: Patric Blomdahl (116)

The 2008–09 Frölunda HC season was the club's 29th season in the Swedish elite league Elitserien. The regular season began on 15 September 2008 against rival team HV71, and concluded on 28 February 2009 against Djurgårdens IF. Frölunda looked to improve upon their progress in the 2007–08 season after being eliminated in the first round of the playoffs by Färjestad BK.

Niklas Andersson was named captain of the team after Jonas Johnson retired. Ronnie Sundin continued serving as alternate captain; Tomi Kallio and Riku Hahl were named alternate captains after Jonas Esbjörs had retired.

== Pre-season ==
=== Nordic Trophy ===
==== Standings ====
Nordic Trophy	GP	W	L	T	OTW	OTL	PSW	PSL	GF	GA	PTS
y- (Sweden) Linköpings HC	9	7	2	0	0	0	0	0	31	19	14
y- (Sweden) Frölunda HC	9	7	2	0	0	0	0	0	25	18	14
y- (Sweden) Djurgårdens IF	9	6	3	0	0	0	0	0	33	23	12
y- (Finland) HIFK	9	4	3	2	0	0	2	0	30	26	12
x- (Finland) Kärpät	9	5	4	0	0	0	0	0	20	17	10
x- (Finland) TPS	9	3	5	1	0	0	1	0	18	29	8
x- (Sweden) Färjestads BK	9	3	5	1	0	0	0	1	22	27	7
x- (Sweden) HV71	9	3	6	0	0	0	0	0	19	25	6
z- (Finland) Jokerit	9	2	6	1	0	0	0	1	24	29	5
z- (Finland) Tappara	9	2	6	1	0	0	0	1	21	30	5

y - clinched semi-final spot for championship, x - clinched semi-final spot for 5th place, z - play for 9th place

==== Game log ====
2008 Nordic trophy game log

Group stage: 7–2–0 (home: 4–0–0; road: 3–2–0)
Round	Date	Opponent	Score	Goaltender	Venue	Attendance	Record	Pts	Recap
1	7 August	TPS	1–4	Ahonen	Turkuhalli	2,015	0–1–0	0
2	8 August	HIFK	1–0	Holmqvist	Järvenpää	1,015	1–1–0	2
3	10 August	Kärpät	3–1	Ahonen	Oulun Energia Areena	2,562	2–1–0	4
4	15 August	Färjestad	3–1	Holmqvist	Nobelhallen	1,795	3–1–0	6
5	21 August	Jokerit	5–3	Ahonen	Borås Ishall	918	4–1–0	8
6	22 August	Tappara	2–1	Holmqvist	Borås Ishall	733	5–1–0	10
7	26 August	Djurgården	2–6	Ahonen	Vallentuna Ishall	1,610	5–2–0	10
8	29 August	HV71	4–0	Ahonen	Mölndals Ishall	—	6–2–0	12
9	2 September	Linköping	4–2	Holmqvist	Sannarpshallen	1,577	7–2–0	14

Playoffs
Round	Date	Opponent	Score	Goaltender	Venue	Attendance	Recap
Semifinal	5 September	Djurgården	3–2 (ps)	Ahonen	Cloetta Center	1,926
Final	6 September	Linköping	4–5 (ot)	Holmqvist	Cloetta Center	3,623

Legend: Win (2 points) Overtime win (2 point) Loss (0 points) Overtime loss (1 point)

=== Exhibition game against Ottawa ===
On 2 October 2008, Frölunda play an exhibition game against the Ottawa Senators. The game was played two days prior to the 2008–09 NHL season premier between Ottawa and the Pittsburgh Penguins in the Stockholm Globe Arena. Ottawa's captain Daniel Alfredsson is a native of Gothenburg and Frölunda is the only other professional team he has represented. Prior to the game Alfredsson was honoured with a decorated pillar in Scandinavium. Frölunda lost the game by a score of 1–4, with Oscar Hedman scoring their only goal. Alfredsson scored the second goal for the Senators, Chris Kelly, Alexandre Picard and Jason Spezza scored the Senators' other three goals in the game.

== Regular season ==
=== Standings ===
Elitserien	GP	W	L	T	OTW	OTL	GF	GA	Pts
y – Färjestads BK	55	30	17	4	1	3	158	122	99
x – Linköpings HC	55	26	16	8	1	4	166	152	92
x – Frölunda HC	55	25	20	2	6	2	144	130	91
x – HV71	55	22	13	9	4	7	160	144	90
x – Luleå HF	55	26	20	3	0	6	149	136	87
x – Skellefteå AIK	55	21	22	3	5	4	149	141	80
x – Brynäs IF	55	21	22	6	4	2	128	140	79
x – Timrå IK	55	19	24	4	7	1	152	142	76
e – Modo Hockey	55	20	27	2	4	2	153	177	72
e – Djurgårdens IF	55	17	23	8	5	2	149	155	71
r – Rögle BK	55	18	25	4	1	7	152	178	67
r – Södertälje SK	55	12	28	7	5	3	122	165	56

x – clinched playoff spot; y – clinched regular season league title; e – eliminated from playoff contention; r – play in relegation series

=== Game log ===
2008–09 Game log

September: 1–4–2 (home: 1–1–1; road: 0–3–1)
Round	Date	Opponent	Score	Decision	Venue	Attendance	Record	Pts
7	15 September	HV71	2–6	Holmqvist	Kinnarps Arena	7,038	0–1–0	0
1	18 September	Södertälje	1–2	Holmqvist	AXA Sports Center	4,549	0–2–0	0
2	20 September	Linköping	1–2	Holmqvist	Scandinavium	10,314	0–3–0	0
3	22 September	Timrå	2–3	Holmqvist	E.ON Arena	5,337	0–3–1	1
4	25 September	Modo	3–2	Holmqvist	Scandinavium	10,159	0–3–2	3
5	27 September	Färjestad	1–2	Holmqvist	Löfbergs Lila Arena	7,483	0–4–2	3
6	29 September	Rögle	4–1	Holmqvist	Scandinavium	10,297	1–4–2	6

October: 4–3–3 (home: 3–0–2; road: 1–3–1)
Round	Date	Opponent	Score	Decision	Venue	Attendance	Record	Pts
8	5 October	Skellefteå	2–1	Holmqvist	Scandinavium	11,488	2–4–2	9
9	9 October	Luleå	2–8	Holmqvist	Coop Arena	4,180	2–5–2	9
10	11 October	Djurgården	5–1	Holmqvist	Hovet	6,055	3–5–2	12
11	13 October	Brynäs	1–1	Holmqvist	Scandinavium	11,188	3–5–3	13
12	16 October	Modo	2–3	Ahonen	Swedbank Arena	5,492	3–6–3	13
13	18 October	HV71	5–3	Holmqvist	Scandinavium	12,044	4–6–3	16
14	21 October	Färjestad	2–2	Holmqvist	Scandinavium	11,715	4–6–4	17
15	25 October	Linköping	3–2	Holmqvist	Cloetta Center	8,500	4–6–5	19
16	27 October	Rögle	3–6	Holmqvist	Lindab Arena	5,040	4–7–5	19
17	30 October	Luleå	3–1	Holmqvist	Scandinavium	11,537	5–7–5	22

November: 6–3–1 (home: 2–2–0; road: 4–1–1)
Round	Date	Opponent	Score	Decision	Venue	Attendance	Record	Pts
18	1 November	Djurgården	6–3	Ahonen	Hovet	6,345	6–7–5	25
19	3 November	Skellefteå	3–1	Holmqvist	Skellefteå Kraft Arena	5,252	7–7–5	28
20	13 November	Timrå	0–2	Holmqvist	Scandinavium	11,020	7–8–5	28
21	15 November	Brynäs	1–2	Holmqvist	Läkerol Arena	7,974	7–9–5	28
22	17 November	Södertälje	3–2	Ahonen	Scandinavium	11,248	8–9–5	31
23	20 November	Djurgården	4–1	Holmqvist	Hovet	4,227	9–9–5	34
24	22 November	Färjestad	2–0	Holmqvist	Löfbergs Lila Arena	8,250	10–9–5	37
25	25 November	Rögle	5–0	Ahonen	Scandinavium	11,011	11–9–5	40
26	27 November	HV71	3–2	Holmqvist	Kinnarps Arena	7,038	11–9–6	42
27	30 November	Linköping	0–5	Holmqvist	Scandinavium	11,061	11–10–6	42

December: 5–2–2 (home: 3–1–1; road: 2–1–1)
Round	Date	Opponent	Score	Decision	Venue	Attendance	Record	Pts
28	2 December	Luleå	1–2	Ahonen	Coop Arena	5,005	11–11–6	42
29	4 December	Modo	6–1	Holmqvist	Scandinavium	11,459	12–11–6	45
30	6 December	Söderälje	2–1	Holmqvist	AXA Sports Center	3,629	13–11–6	48
31	8 December	Brynäs	4–2	Holmqvist	Scandinavium	11,582	14–11–6	51
32	11 December	Timrå	3–4	Ahonen	E.ON Arena	5,042	14–11–7	52
33	13 December	Skellefteå	0–2	Holmqvist	Scandinavium	10,666	14–12–7	52
34	26 December	Färjestad	3–2	Ahonen	Scandinavium	12,044	14–12–8	54
35	28 December	Modo	3–1	Holmqvist	Swedbank Arena	7,600	15–12–8	57
36	30 December	Timrå	2–1	Holmqvist	Scandinavium	11,362	16–12–8	60

January: 3–7–1 (home: 2–3–1; road: 1–4–0)
Round	Date	Opponent	Score	Decision	Venue	Attendance	Record	Pts
37	3 January	Linköping	2–3	Holmqvist	Scandinavium	11,800	16–13–8	60
38	5 January	Skellefteå	3–5	Holmqvist	Skellefteå Kraft Arena	5,475	16–14–8	60
39	13 January	Luleå	1–2	Holmqvist	Scandinavium	10,568	16–15–8	60
40	15 January	Rögle	0–5	Holmqvist	Lindab Arena	4,975	16–16–8	60
41	17 January	Brynäs	1–3	Holmqvist	Läkerol Arena	7,909	16–17–8	60
42	20 January	Södertälje	3–1	Holmqvist	Scandinavium	10,036	17–17–8	63
43	22 January	Djurgården	1–2	Holmqvist	Scandinavium	10,850	17–18–8	63
44	24 January	HV71	5–4	Holmqvist	Scandinavium	12,044	17–18–9	65
45	27 January	Luleå	2–4	Ahonen	Coop Arena	4,706	17–19–9	65
46	29 January	Södertälje	4–1	Holmqvist	AXA Sports Center	2,470	18–19–9	68
47	31 January	Skellefteå	1–0	Holmqvist	Scandinavium	11,311	19–19–9	71

February: 6–1–1 (home: 4–0–0; road: 2–1–1)
Round	Date	Opponent	Score	Decision	Venue	Attendance	Record	Pts
50	10 February	Brynäs	4–1	Holmqvist	Scandinavium	11,497	20–19–9	74
48	12 February	Rögle	4–1	Holmqvist	Scandinavium	11,186	21–19–9	77
49	14 February	Färjestad	1–8	Holmqvist	Löfbergs Lila Arena	8,250	21–20–9	77
51	19 February	HV71	3–2	Holmqvist	Kinnarps Arena	7,038	21–20–10	79
52	21 February	Linköping	4–1	Holmqvist	Cloetta Center	8,401	22–20–10	82
53	23 February	Timrå	3–2	Holmqvist	E.ON Arena	5,624	23–20–10	85
54	26 February	Modo	4–2	Holmqvist	Scandinavium	12,044	24–20–10	88
55	28 February	Djurgården	5–3	Holmqvist	Scandinavium	11,795	25–20–10	91

Legend: Win (3 points) Overtime win (2 point) Loss (0 points) Overtime loss (1 point) Tie (1 point)

== Playoffs ==
Playoffs

Quarterfinals vs #5 Luleå: 4–1 (home: 3–0; road: 1–1)
Round	Date	Opponent	Score	Decision	Venue	Attendance	Series
1	5 March	Luleå	1–5	Holmqvist	Coop Arena	5,103	0–1
2	7 March	Luleå	4–2	Holmqvist	Scandinavium	11,466	1–1
3	9 March	Luleå	5–1	Holmqvist	Coop Arena	5,600	2–1
4	11 March	Luleå	5–1	Holmqvist	Scandinavium	11,595	3–1
5	12 March	Luleå	1–0	Holmqvist	Scandinavium	11,075	4–1

Semifinals vs #4 HV71: 2–4 (home: 1–2; road: 1–2)
Round	Date	Opponent	Score	Decision	Venue	Attendance	Series
1	19 March	HV71	1–3	Holmqvist	Kinnarps Arena	7,038	0–1
2	21 March	HV71	2–1	Holmqvist	Scandinavium	11,902	1–1
3	23 March	HV71	3–1	Holmqvist	Kinnarps Arena	7,038	2–1
4	25 March	HV71	1–6	Holmqvist	Scandinavium	12,044	2–2
5	26 March	HV71	1–4	Holmqvist	Scandinavium	12,044	2–3
6	28 March	HV71	2–4	Holmqvist	Kinnarps Arena	7,038	2–4

Legend: Win Loss

== Player statistics ==
=== Skaters ===
Note: GP = Games played; G = Goals; A = Assists; Pts = Points; PIM = Penalty minutes

Regular season

Playoffs

Player	GP	G	A	Pts	PIM	GP	G	A	Pts	PIM
Niklas Andersson	52	16	21	37	22	11	3	4	7	10
Tomi Kallio	55	19	15	34	95	11	4	5	9	6
Riku Hahl	52	7	24	31	22	10	1	5	6	4
Lars Eller	48	12	17	29	28	10	3	1	4	12
Fredrik Pettersson	53	8	18	26	67	10	5	1	6	18
Magnus Kahnberg	55	9	16	25	16	11	0	2	2	4
Tuukka Mäntylä	53	3	17	20	52	11	0	0	0	2
Janne Niskala	35	9	10	19	20	11	3	3	6	8
Philip Larsen	53	2	15	17	18	11	2	1	3	4
Ronnie Sundin	54	3	12	15	34	11	0	4	4	8
Jonas Nordquist	38	8	6	14	6					
Mikael Johansson	55	3	11	14	22	11	0	1	1	12
Joakim Andersson	49	6	6	12	22	11	0	0	0	4
John Pohl	12	5	7	12	6	11	2	7	9	8
Oscar Hedman	55	5	6	11	26	11	0	0	0	14
Erik Karlsson	45	5	5	10	10	11	1	2	3	24
Toni Söderholm	37	3	7	10	53					
Karl Fabricius	48	5	3	8	30	11	0	1	1	8
Andreas Karlsson	12	3	5	8	6					
Patric Blomdahl	48	5	2	7	116	11	0	0	0	31
Joe DiPenta	47	1	5	6	71	11	0	1	1	12
Johan Andersson	52	1	4	5	37	3	0	0	0	0
Jonas Johnson	14	0	5	5	0	11	2	3	5	10
Nicklas Lasu	14	3	1	4	4	11	0	1	1	8
Carl Klingberg	10	2	1	3	0					
Andreas Holmqvist	7	1	2	3	10					
Oscar Ackeström	7	0	1	1	2					
Johan Holmqvist	55	0	1	1	2	11	0	0	0	0
Casper Carning	2	0	0	0	0					
Martin Røymark	4	0	0	0	0					
Tim Bränholm	5	0	0	0	0					
Henrik Tömmernes	11	0	0	0	0					
Ari Ahonen	55	0	0	0	0	11	0	0	0	0

== Transactions ==
Acquired
Player	Former team	Date
Lars Eller	Frölunda J20	5 March
Joakim Andersson	Frölunda J20	5 March
Oscar Hedman	Modo Hockey	27 March
Patric Blomdahl	Linköpings HC	25 April
Andreas Karlsson	Tampa Bay Lightning	11 May
Joe DiPenta	Anaheim Ducks	15 July
Riku Hahl	Timrå IK	16 July
Johan Holmqvist	Dallas Stars	23 July
Erik Karlsson	Frölunda J20	25 August
Oscar Ackeström	HC Slovan Bratislava	9 September
Henrik Tömmernes	Frölunda J20	29 October
Janne Niskala	Tampa Bay Lightning	13 November
Martin Røymark (loan)	Sparta Warriors	17 December
Jonas Johnson	comeback	19 January
John Pohl	HC Lugano	22 January

Leaving
Player	New team	Date
Ossi-Petteri Grönholm	Kärpät	—
Jonas Esbjörs	retire	—
Steve Kariya	HPK	—
Oscar Ackeström	HC Slovan Bratislava	27 March
Jonas Ahnelöv	Phoenix Coyotes	27 March
Jonas Johnson	retire	9 April
Joel Gistedt	Phoenix Coyotes	25 April
Michael Holmqvist	Djurgårdens IF	8 May
Martin Plüss	SC Bern	22 May
Antti-Jussi Niemi	HC Lada Togliatti	13 June
Andreas Holmqvist	Djurgårdens IF	30 September
Oscar Ackeström	Hannover Scorpions	5 October
Toni Söderholm	HIFK	20 January

== Drafted players ==
Frölunda HC players picked at the 2009 NHL entry draft.

Round	Pick	Player	Nationality	NHL team
2nd	34th	Carl Klingberg	Sweden	Atlanta Thrashers
2nd	46th	Robin Lehner	Sweden	Ottawa Senators
5th	143rd	Peter Andersson	Sweden	Vancouver Canucks
