= Tomi Kallio =

Finnish ice hockey player (born 1977)

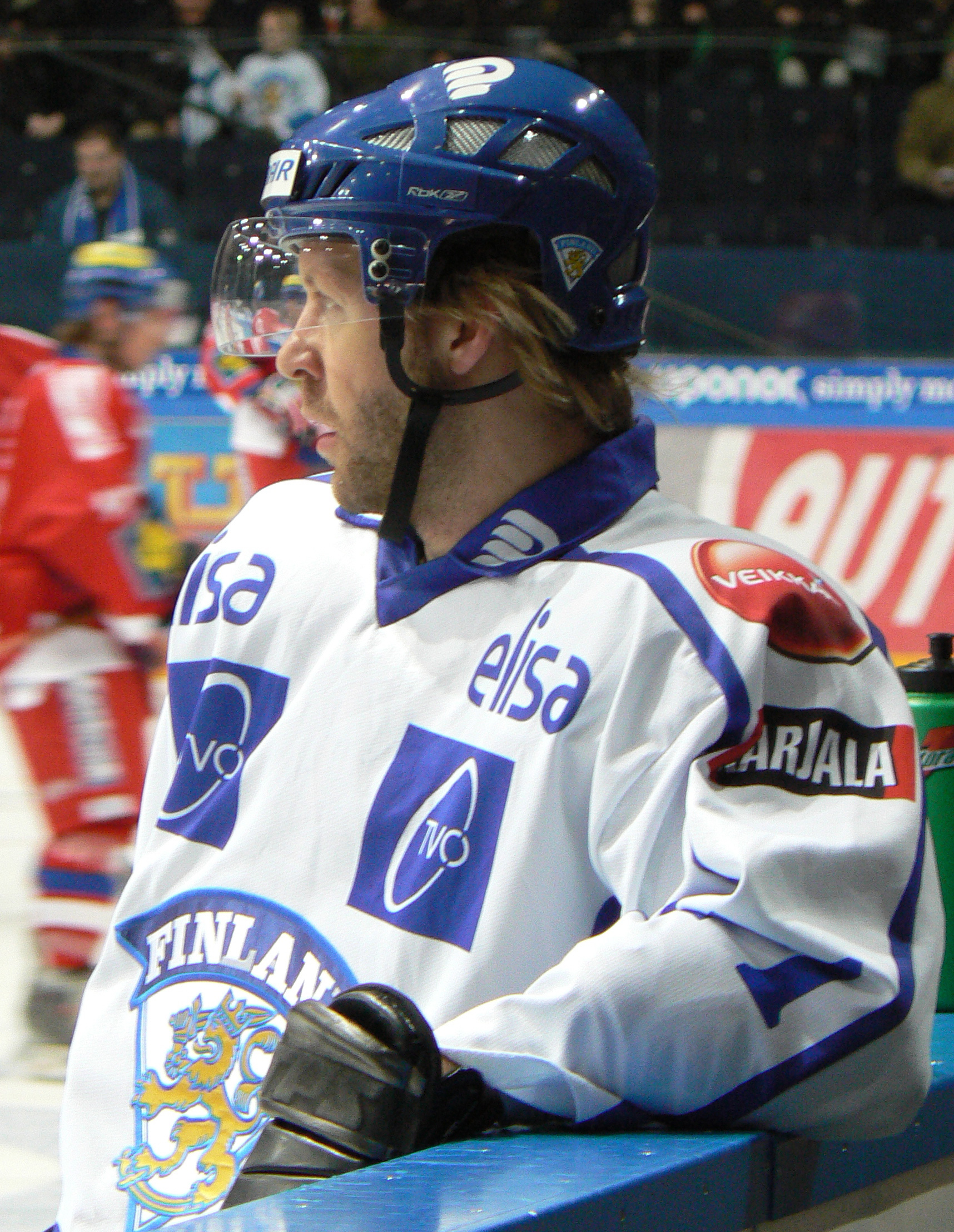
- Kallio Tomi with Team Finland against the Czech Republic during a Sweden Hockey Games game in Tampere, Finland in February 2008
- Born: 27 January 1977 (age 49) Turku, Finland
- Height: 6 ft 0.5 in (184 cm)
- Weight: 189 lb (86 kg; 13 st 7 lb)
- Position: Right wing
- Shot: Left
- Played for: Atlanta Thrashers; Columbus Blue Jackets; Philadelphia Flyers; Frölunda HC; Växjö Lakers; TPS
- National team: Finland
- NHL draft: 81st overall, 1995; Colorado Avalanche
- Playing career: 1995–2018

Tomi Kristian Kallio (born 27 January 1977) is a Finnish former professional ice hockey right winger who last played for HC TPS in the Finnish Liiga. After retiring from TPS in 2018, Kallio remained with the team and assumed the role of director of European scouting.

== Playing career ==
Kallio was drafted 81st overall by the Colorado Avalanche in the 1995 NHL entry draft and began his professional career with TPS of the SM-liiga and spent five seasons there, winning the championship trophy in 1999 and 2000.

He then moved to the National Hockey League with the Atlanta Thrashers who claimed him from Colorado in the 1999 NHL Expansion Draft. He spent two seasons in Atlanta before he was traded with Pauli Levokari to the Columbus Blue Jackets for Petteri Nummelin and Chris Nielsen. He would play just 12 games for Columbus before claimed off waivers by the Philadelphia Flyers, playing just seven games before moving to Sweden to play for Västra Frölunda HC where he continued to play for the rest of the season. He won the Le Mat Trophy twice with Frölunda, in 2003 and 2005.

On 19 January 2009, Kallio extended his contract with Frölunda HC by two years. After being denied another extension after his contract expired in 2011, Kallio signed a two-year contract with Växjö Lakers Hockey in the Elitserien. In the 2011 European Trophy, Kallio visited the Frölunda–Salzburg game in Frölunda Campus to be thanked by a few thousands Frölunda supporters for his time in Frölunda. Frölunda won the game 3–2.

In his fourth season with Växjö Lakers Hockey in the 2014–15 season, Kallio captained the club to their first SHL championship. On 22 July 2015, Kallio opted to return home to his original club, TPS of the Finnish Liiga on a one-year deal.

== Career statistics ==
=== Regular season and playoffs ===
			Regular season					Playoffs
Season	Team	League	GP	G	A	Pts	PIM	GP	G	A	Pts	PIM
1993–94	TPS	FIN U20	33	9	7	16	16	6	0	1	1	2
1994–95	TPS	FIN U20	14	5	12	17	24	—	—	—	—	—
1994–95	Kiekko-67	FIN.2	25	8	5	13	16	—	—	—	—	—
1995–96	TPS	FIN U20	8	8	3	11	14	—	—	—	—	—
1995–96	TPS	SM-l	8	2	3	5	10	4	0	0	0	2
1995–96	Kiekko-67	FIN.2	29	10	11	21	28	—	—	—	—	—
1996–97	TPS	FIN U20	2	1	1	2	2	—	—	—	—	—
1996–97	TPS	SM-l	47	9	10	19	18	8	2	0	2	2
1997–98	TPS	SM-l	47	10	10	20	8	4	0	2	2	0
1998–99	TPS	SM-l	54	15	21	36	20	10	3	4	7	6
1999–2000	TPS	SM-l	50	26	27	53	40	11	4	9	13	4
2000–01	Atlanta Thrashers	NHL	56	14	13	27	22	—	—	—	—	—
2001–02	Atlanta Thrashers	NHL	60	8	14	22	12	—	—	—	—	—
2002–03	Atlanta Thrashers	NHL	5	0	2	2	4	—	—	—	—	—
2002–03	Columbus Blue Jackets	NHL	12	1	2	3	8	—	—	—	—	—
2002–03	Philadelphia Flyers	NHL	7	1	0	1	2	—	—	—	—	—
2002–03	Frölunda HC	SEL	10	6	8	14	10	16	8	8	16	14
2003–04	Frölunda HC	SEL	50	24	17	41	54	10	5	8	13	6
2004–05	Frölunda HC	SEL	50	18	19	37	24	14	7	6	13	6
2005–06	Frölunda HC	SEL	49	26	25	51	68	17	6	9	15	32
2006–07	Frölunda HC	SEL	55	18	36	54	103	—	—	—	—	—
2007–08	Frölunda HC	SEL	54	27	20	47	54	7	1	4	5	6
2008–09	Frölunda HC	SEL	55	19	15	34	95	11	4	5	9	6
2009–10	Frölunda HC	SEL	55	18	22	40	40	7	2	6	8	6
2010–11	Frölunda HC	SEL	55	12	18	30	36	—	—	—	—	—
2011–12	Växjö Lakers	SEL	43	12	17	29	18	—	—	—	—	—
2012–13	Växjö Lakers	SEL	55	12	17	29	18	—	—	—	—	—
2013–14	Växjö Lakers	SHL	55	11	22	33	12	8	0	3	3	2
2014–15	Växjö Lakers	SHL	51	8	17	25	16	18	1	4	5	8
2015–16	TPS	Liiga	60	18	26	44	58	8	2	5	7	6
2016–17	TPS	Liiga	59	20	30	50	44	6	1	1	2	2
2017–18	TPS	Liiga	58	15	40	55	49	7	0	4	4	4
SM-l/Liiga totals			383	114	167	282	247	58	12	25	37	28
NHL totals			140	24	31	55	48	—	—	—	—	—
SEL/SHL totals			637	211	253	464	548	108	34	53	87	86

=== International ===
Medal record

Representing Finland

Ice hockey

World Championships
Silver medal – second place	1999 Norway	
Silver medal – second place	2001 Germany	
Silver medal – second place	2007 Russia	
Bronze medal – third place	2000 Russia	
Bronze medal – third place	2006 Latvia	

IIHF European Junior Championships
Gold medal – first place	1995 Germany	

Year	Team	Event	Result	GP	G	A	Pts	PIM
1995	Finland	EJC	1st place, gold medalist(s)	5	4	2	6	6
1996	Finland	WJC	6th	6	2	2	4	2
1997	Finland	WJC	5th	6	5	4	9	2
1999	Finland	WC	2nd place, silver medalist(s)	12	1	2	3	0
2000	Finland	WC	3rd place, bronze medalist(s)	9	2	5	7	0
2001	Finland	WC	2nd place, silver medalist(s)	9	4	1	5	6
2002	Finland	OG	6th	4	1	2	3	2
2002	Finland	WC	4th	9	3	2	5	6
2003	Finland	WC	5th	7	3	3	6	2
2004	Finland	WC	6th	7	2	5	7	0
2005	Finland	WC	7th	7	1	2	3	4
2006	Finland	WC	3rd place, bronze medalist(s)	9	4	2	6	2
2007	Finland	WC	2nd place, silver medalist(s)	9	1	2	3	33
Junior totals				17	11	8	19	10
Senior totals				82	22	26	48	55
