= Joe DiPenta =

Canadian ice hockey player (born 1979)

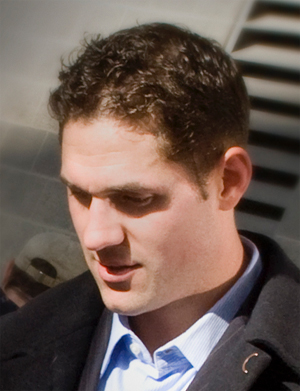
- DiPenta in 2007
- Born: February 25, 1979 (age 47) Barrie, Ontario, Canada
- Height: 6 ft 2 in (188 cm)
- Weight: 199 lb (90 kg; 14 st 3 lb)
- Position: Defence
- Shot: Right
- Played for: Atlanta Thrashers; Anaheim Ducks; Frölunda HC
- NHL draft: 61st overall, 1998; Florida Panthers
- Playing career: 2000–2011
- Website: Joe DiPenta.com

Joseph V. DiPenta (born February 25, 1979) is a Canadian former professional ice hockey defenceman. DiPenta played 4 seasons in the National Hockey League and 8 seasons in the American Hockey League. He is one of only few hockey players to have won both the Calder Cup and Stanley Cup during their career.

== Early life ==
DiPenta was born in Barrie, Ontario in 1979. He began playing hockey at age four and later moved to Cole Harbour, Nova Scotia at age seven.

== Playing career ==
=== Junior ===
DiPenta played for the Smiths Falls Bears of the Central Canada Hockey League in the Canadian Junior Hockey League. After receiving the CJHL Scholarship award in 1997, DiPenta went on to play for Boston University. During his time with Boston, he was drafted 61st overall by the Florida Panthers in the 1998 NHL entry draft.

DiPenta made his major junior debut with the Halifax Mooseheads of the Quebec Major Junior Hockey League in 1999-00 and finished the season with 13 goals and 43 assists in 63 games. As the hosts, DiPenta and the Mooseheads played in the 2000 Memorial Cup. Halifax was eliminated however by the OHL's Barrie Colts.

=== Professional ===
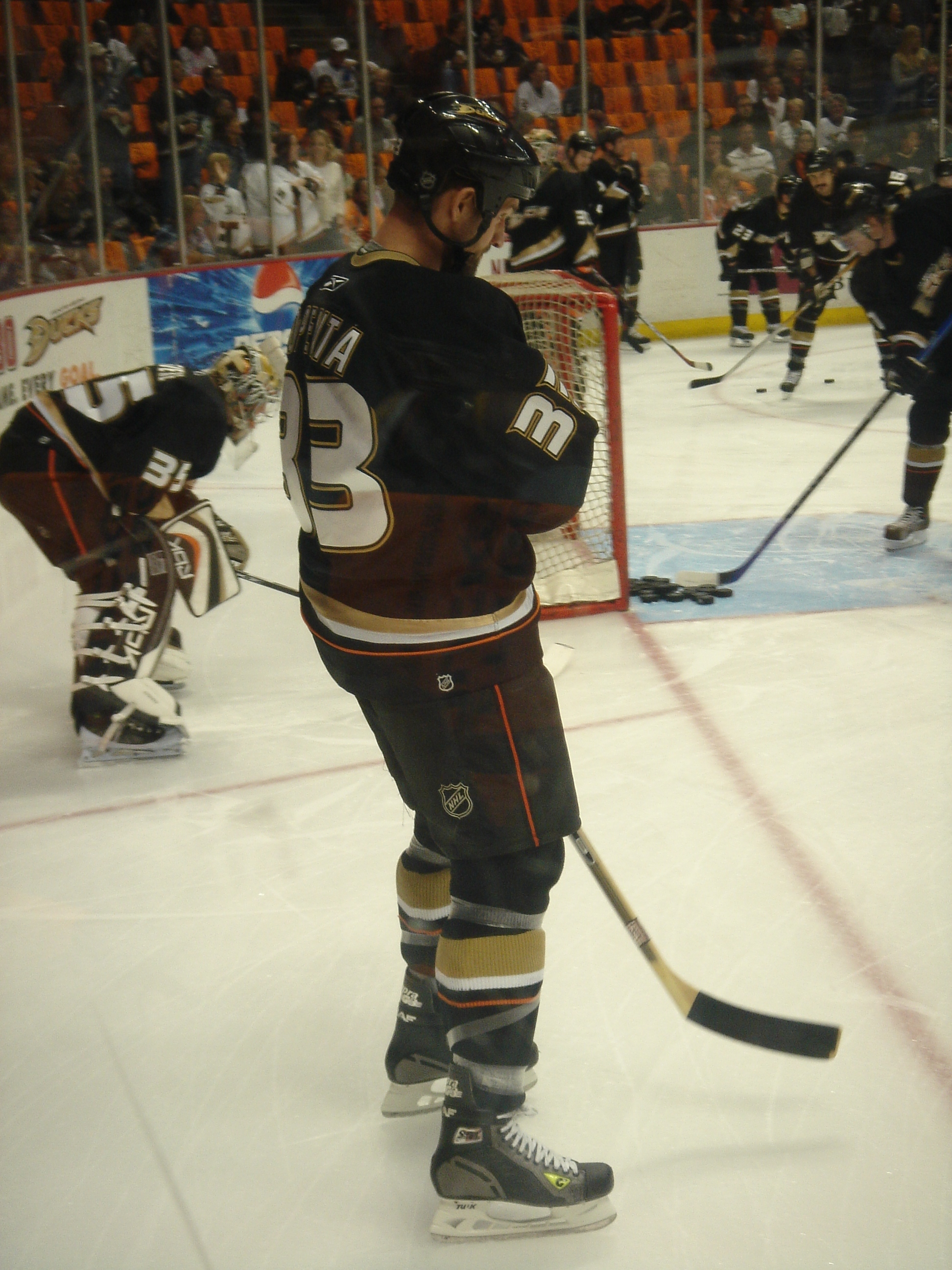
DiPenta with the Anaheim Ducks in 2007

After becoming a free agent, DiPenta signed with the Philadelphia Flyers in 2000 and made his professional debut in the AHL with the Flyers affiliate team, the Philadelphia Phantoms. He was then traded to the Atlanta Thrashers in 2002, was assigned to their AHL affiliate, the Chicago Wolves for the 2001-02 season and finished with 2 assists as the Wolves went on to win the 2002 Calder Cup.

DiPenta made his NHL debut with Atlanta in 2002-03, scoring 2 points in just 3 games before being sent back to the Chicago Wolves for the rest of the season.

On August 19, 2004, DiPenta signed with the Vancouver Canucks and was assigned to their AHL affiliate at the time, the Manitoba Moose.

One year later, DiPenta signed with the Mighty Ducks of Anaheim for the 2005-06 season and joined the team with legends such as Scott Niedermayer and Teemu Selänne. With Chris Pronger joining the following season, the newly renamed, Anaheim Ducks captured their first Stanley Cup in franchise history, defeating the Ottawa Senators in five games. This gave DiPenta his first and only Stanley Cup title. DiPenta then resigned with the Ducks to a one-year contract for the following 2007-08 season.

In the 2008–09 season, DiPenta signed a one-year contract with Frölunda HC of Elitserien.

On July 11, 2009, DiPenta attempted a return to the NHL signing a one-year contract with the Buffalo Sabres.

As a free agent from the Sabres, DiPenta made a return of sorts to the Ducks organization, signing a one-year contract with the team's AHL affiliate, the Syracuse Crunch, on August 26, 2010. DiPenta then retired after the season's end.

== Personal life ==
DiPenta is a Christian. He has spoken about his faith publicly and currently works as a professional EOS implementer. In 2023, DiPenta was inducted into the Nova Scotia Sport Hall of Fame.

== Career statistics ==
			Regular season					Playoffs
Season	Team	League	GP	G	A	Pts	PIM	GP	G	A	Pts	PIM
1997–98	Boston University	HE	38	2	16	18	50	—	—	—	—	—
1998–99	Boston University	HE	36	2	15	17	72	—	—	—	—	—
1999–00	Halifax Mooseheads	QMJHL	63	13	43	56	83	10	3	4	7	26
2000–01	Philadelphia Phantoms	AHL	71	3	5	8	65	10	1	2	3	15
2001–02	Philadelphia Phantoms	AHL	61	2	4	6	71	—	—	—	—	—
2001–02	Chicago Wolves	AHL	15	0	2	2	15	25	1	3	4	22
2002–03	Chicago Wolves	AHL	76	2	17	19	107	9	0	1	1	7
2002–03	Atlanta Thrashers	NHL	3	1	1	2	0	—	—	—	—	—
2003–04	Chicago Wolves	AHL	73	0	6	6	105	10	1	0	1	13
2004–05	Manitoba Moose	AHL	73	2	10	12	48	14	0	5	5	2
2005–06	Mighty Ducks of Anaheim	NHL	72	2	6	8	46	16	0	0	0	13
2006–07	Anaheim Ducks	NHL	76	2	6	8	48	16	0	0	0	4
2007–08	Anaheim Ducks	NHL	23	1	4	5	16	—	—	—	—	—
2008–09	Frölunda HC	SEL	47	1	5	6	71	11	0	1	1	12
2009–10	Portland Pirates	AHL	65	2	5	7	83	4	0	0	0	4
2010–11	Syracuse Crunch	AHL	70	1	3	4	62	—	—	—	—	—
NHL totals			174	6	17	23	110	32	0	0	0	17

== Awards and honors ==
Award	Year
AHL
Calder Cup champion	2002
NHL
Stanley Cup champion	2007

== Transactions ==
- June 27, 1998 — Drafted by the Florida Panthers in the third round, 61st overall.
- July 12, 2000 — Signed by the Philadelphia Flyers as a free agent.
- March 5, 2002 — Traded to the Atlanta Thrashers for Jarrod Skalde.
- August 19, 2004 — Signed by the Vancouver Canucks as a free agent.
- August 11, 2005 — Signed by the Mighty Ducks of Anaheim as a free agent.
- August 14, 2007 — Re-signed by the Anaheim Ducks as a free agent to a one-year contract.
- July 15, 2008 — Signed by Frölunda HC as a free agent.
- July 11, 2009 — Signed by the Buffalo Sabres as a free agent.
