= Martin Røymark =

Norwegian professional ice hockey winger (born 1986)

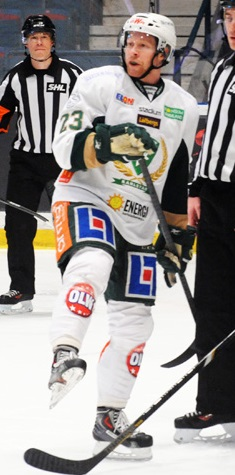
- Røymark in 2014
- Born: November 10, 1986 (age 38); Oslo, Norway
- Height: 6 ft 0 in (183 cm)
- Weight: 190 lb (86 kg; 13 st 8 lb)
- Position: Winger
- Shoots: Left
- GET team Former teams: Vålerenga Ishockey; Manglerud Star; Sparta Warriors; Frölunda HC; Timrå IK; Färjestad BK; Tappara
- National team: Norway
- Playing career: 2002–present

Martin Nikolai Røymark (born November 10, 1986) is a Norwegian professional ice hockey winger, currently playing for Vålerenga Ishockey of the Norwegian Get-ligaen (GET).

== Playing career ==
On October 5, 2008, Røymark was invited to practice with Frölunda HC of the Elitserien for three days, pending further evaluation of him. On October 8, a press release said that he would return to his Norwegian team. However, it was decided that two parties would stay in touch.

In the 2009–10 Elitserien season, he played 55 matches for Frölunda, scoring five goals and having four assists. On April 12, Frölunda's General Manager, Kent Norberg, stated that they needed to reduce the number of forwards in the club. As a result, Røymark, Joakim Andersson, and Jens Karlsson was released from their contract, along with defenceman Janne Niskala.

== Career statistics ==
=== Regular season and playoffs ===
			Regular season					Playoffs
Season	Team	League	GP	G	A	Pts	PIM	GP	G	A	Pts	PIM
2002–03	Manglerud Star	NOR U19	22	10	10	20	4	—	—	—	—	—
2002–03	Manglerud Star	NOR	3	0	0	0	0	—	—	—	—	—
2003–04	Manglerud Star	NOR U19	11	4	11	15	20	—	—	—	—	—
2003–04	Manglerud Star	NOR	28	2	1	3	12	—	—	—	—	—
2004–05	Manglerud Star	NOR.2	32	14	15	29	26	6	0	0	0	6
2005–06	Sparta Warriors	NOR	42	9	7	16	20	6	1	2	3	4
2006–07	Sparta Warriors	NOR	41	10	8	18	43	13	2	2	4	14
2006–07	Sparta Warriors 2	NOR.2	1	1	0	1	0	—	—	—	—	—
2007–08	Sparta Warriors	NOR	40	18	24	42	77	6	0	4	4	2
2008–09	Sparta Warriors	NOR	42	14	32	46	36	15	5	6	11	0
2008–09	Frölunda HC	SEL	4	0	0	0	0	—	—	—	—	—
2009–10	Frölunda HC	SEL	55	5	4	9	12	6	0	0	0	2
2010–11	Timrå IK	SEL	55	14	9	23	12	—	—	—	—	—
2011–12	Timrå IK	SEL	55	6	11	17	22	10	3	0	3	2
2012–13	Färjestad BK	SEL	55	4	2	6	22	10	0	0	0	4
2013–14	Färjestad BK	SHL	52	8	5	13	12	15	1	2	3	0
2014–15	Färjestad BK	SHL	55	6	7	13	12	3	0	1	1	2
2015–16	Färjestad BK	SHL	52	2	12	14	6	5	0	2	2	0
2016–17	Tappara	Liiga	56	8	7	15	6	18	1	1	2	2
2017–18	Modo Hockey	Allsv	42	4	5	9	12	—	—	—	—	—
2018–19	Vålerenga	NOR	42	16	23	39	51	11	8	4	12	8
2019–20	Vålerenga	NOR	28	11	5	16	30	—	—	—	—	—
2020–21	Vålerenga	NOR	25	10	8	18	14	—	—	—	—	—
2021–22	Vålerenga	NOR	37	7	16	23	14	6	3	1	4	2
2022–23	Vålerenga	NOR	45	16	16	32	10	8	1	1	2	2
NOR totals			373	113	140	253	307	65	20	20	40	32
SHL totals			383	45	50	95	98	49	4	5	9	10

=== International ===
Year	Team	Event	GP	G	A	Pts	PIM
2003	Norway	WJC18 D1	5	2	3	5	0
2004	Norway	WJC18	6	0	3	3	2
2005	Norway	WJC D1	5	1	0	1	6
2006	Norway	WJC	6	0	1	1	4
2008	Norway	WC	7	0	1	1	2
2009	Norway	OGQ	3	0	0	0	0
2009	Norway	WC	6	0	0	0	0
2010	Norway	OG	4	0	0	0	0
2010	Norway	WC	6	0	1	1	4
2011	Norway	WC	7	1	2	3	2
2012	Norway	WC	8	1	0	1	8
2013	Norway	WC	7	0	1	1	4
2014	Norway	OG	4	0	0	0	0
2014	Norway	WC	7	0	0	0	0
2015	Norway	WC	7	0	0	0	2
2016	Norway	OGQ	3	0	0	0	0
2016	Norway	WC	7	1	0	1	0
2017	Norway	WC	7	0	0	0	2
2018	Norway	OG	5	0	1	1	0
2018	Norway	WC	7	0	0	0	4
2019	Norway	WC	7	1	0	1	0
2021	Norway	WC	7	0	0	0	16
2021	Norway	OGQ	3	1	0	1	2
Junior totals			22	3	7	10	12
Senior totals			112	5	6	11	46
