= Niklas Andersson =

Swedish ice hockey player (born 1971)

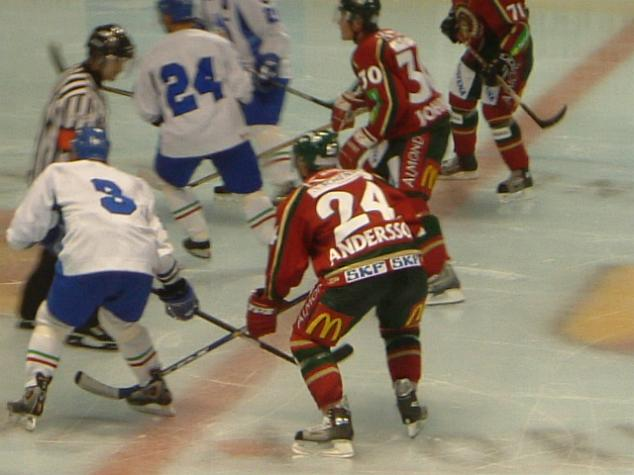
- Andersson with Frölunda HC in Italy, 2005
- Born: 20 May 1971 (age 55) Kungälv, Sweden
- Height: 5 ft 9 in (175 cm)
- Weight: 176 lb (80 kg; 12 st 8 lb)
- Position: Left wing
- Shot: Left
- Played for: Frölunda HC; Quebec Nordiques; New York Islanders; San Jose Sharks; Nashville Predators; Calgary Flames
- National team: Sweden
- NHL draft: 68th overall, 1989; Quebec Nordiques
- Playing career: 1987–2011

Niklas Per Andersson (born 20 May 1971) is a Swedish former professional ice hockey left winger. In his career, he spent time with several National Hockey League (NHL) teams as well as various minor professional teams in North America, but mostly played for Frölunda HC in the Swedish Elitserien. He is the younger brother of former hockey player Mikael Andersson and the father of Lias Andersson.

== Playing career ==
Andersson was selected in the 4th round (68th overall) of the 1989 NHL entry draft by the Quebec Nordiques, while he was playing in his native Sweden for Västra Frölunda HC. At the age of 20, he left Frölunda to play in the American Hockey League (AHL) for the Nordiques' affiliate, the Halifax Citadels. He played there for two years until the team moved to Cornwall, Ontario. After a year with Cornwall he was signed as a free agent by the New York Islanders, and assigned to their International Hockey League (IHL) club, the Denver Grizzlies (which became the Utah Grizzlies the following year), until being recalled halfway through the 1995–96 season. He finished that year with the Islanders, and played another two before signing with the San Jose Sharks prior to the 1997–98 season.

Andersson spent the following year with two minor clubs, one in the AHL and one in the IHL. He was not re-signed by the Sharks, and instead went to the Toronto Maple Leafs. He never played in the NHL for the Leafs, and was instead sent to the IHL's Chicago Wolves until he traded back to the Islanders on 17 August 1999 for Craig Charron. Partway through the season he was claimed off of waivers by the Nashville Predators and played seven games for them before being placed back on waivers and picked up by the Islanders again. He finished the year with them, playing in 17 games and scoring 10 points.

During the following off season he was signed by the Calgary Flames, but played most of the season in the IHL with the Chicago Wolves again. After that season, he returned to his native Sweden and his old club Frölunda HC, for whom he had been a key player the past nine seasons.

On 9 March 2011, Andersson decided to retire completely from hockey, having played 763 games for Frölunda HC. He is currently an amateur scout covering Europe for the Los Angeles Kings.

== Career statistics ==
=== Regular season and playoffs ===
| | | | Regular season | | | | | Playoffs |
| Season | Team | League | GP | G | A | Pts | PIM | GP | G | A | Pts | PIM |
|---|---|---|---|---|---|---|---|---|---|---|---|---|
| 1987–88 | Västra Frölunda HC | SWE II | 15 | 5 | 5 | 10 | 6 | 8 | 6 | 4 | 10 | 4 |
| 1988–89 | Västra Frölunda HC | SWE II | 30 | 12 | 24 | 36 | 24 | 10 | 4 | 6 | 10 | 4 |
| 1989–90 | Västra Frölunda HC | SEL | 38 | 10 | 19 | 29 | 14 | — | — | — | — | — |
| 1990–91 | Västra Frölunda HC | SEL | 22 | 6 | 10 | 16 | 16 | — | — | — | — | — |
| 1990–91 | Västra Frölunda HC | Allsv | 17 | 8 | 15 | 23 | 12 | 10 | 6 | 3 | 9 | 24 |
| 1991–92 | Halifax Citadels | AHL | 57 | 8 | 26 | 34 | 41 | — | — | — | — | — |
| 1992–93 | Halifax Citadels | AHL | 76 | 32 | 50 | 82 | 42 | — | — | — | — | — |
| 1992–93 | Quebec Nordiques | NHL | 3 | 0 | 1 | 1 | 2 | — | — | — | — | — |
| 1993–94 | Cornwall Aces | AHL | 42 | 18 | 34 | 52 | 8 | — | — | — | — | — |
| 1994–95 | Denver Grizzlies | IHL | 66 | 22 | 39 | 61 | 28 | 15 | 8 | 13 | 21 | 10 |
| 1995–96 | Utah Grizzlies | IHL | 30 | 13 | 22 | 35 | 25 | — | — | — | — | — |
| 1995–96 | New York Islanders | NHL | 48 | 14 | 12 | 26 | 12 | — | — | — | — | — |
| 1996–97 | New York Islanders | NHL | 74 | 12 | 31 | 43 | 57 | — | — | — | — | — |
| 1997–98 | Utah Grizzlies | IHL | 21 | 6 | 20 | 26 | 24 | 4 | 3 | 1 | 4 | 4 |
| 1997–98 | Kentucky Thoroughblades | AHL | 37 | 10 | 28 | 38 | 54 | — | — | — | — | — |
| 1997–98 | San Jose Sharks | NHL | 5 | 0 | 0 | 0 | 2 | — | — | — | — | — |
| 1998–99 | Chicago Wolves | IHL | 65 | 17 | 47 | 64 | 49 | 10 | 2 | 2 | 4 | 10 |
| 1999–2000 | Chicago Wolves | IHL | 52 | 20 | 21 | 41 | 59 | 9 | 6 | 1 | 7 | 4 |
| 1999–2000 | New York Islanders | NHL | 17 | 3 | 7 | 10 | 8 | — | — | — | — | — |
| 1999–2000 | Nashville Predators | NHL | 7 | 0 | 1 | 1 | 0 | — | — | — | — | — |
| 2000–01 | Chicago Wolves | IHL | 66 | 33 | 39 | 72 | 81 | 16 | 1 | 14 | 15 | 14 |
| 2000–01 | Calgary Flames | NHL | 11 | 0 | 1 | 1 | 4 | — | — | — | — | — |
| 2001–02 | Västra Frölunda HC | SEL | 41 | 14 | 32 | 46 | 64 | 7 | 0 | 2 | 2 | 6 |
| 2002–03 | Västra Frölunda HC | SEL | 49 | 24 | 18 | 42 | 59 | 15 | 3 | 7 | 10 | 8 |
| 2003–04 | Västra Frölunda HC | SEL | 46 | 17 | 19 | 36 | 80 | 7 | 1 | 7 | 8 | 2 |
| 2004–05 | Frölunda HC | SEL | 44 | 14 | 27 | 41 | 16 | 14 | 10 | 3 | 13 | 4 |
| 2005–06 | Frölunda HC | SEL | 50 | 13 | 38 | 51 | 53 | 17 | 6 | 10 | 16 | 10 |
| 2006–07 | Frölunda HC | SEL | 51 | 21 | 27 | 48 | 75 | — | — | — | — | — |
| 2007–08 | Frölunda HC | SEL | 48 | 12 | 37 | 49 | 50 | 7 | 2 | 4 | 6 | 12 |
| 2008–09 | Frölunda HC | SEL | 52 | 16 | 21 | 37 | 22 | 11 | 3 | 4 | 7 | 10 |
| 2009–10 | Frölunda HC | SEL | 54 | 15 | 17 | 32 | 50 | 7 | 2 | 3 | 5 | 29 |
| 2010–11 | Frölunda HC | SEL | 53 | 14 | 30 | 44 | 30 | — | — | — | — | — |
| NHL totals | | | 165 | 29 | 53 | 82 | 85 | — | — | — | — | — |
| SEL totals | | | 548 | 176 | 295 | 471 | 529 | 85 | 27 | 40 | 67 | 81 |

=== International ===
Medal record

Ice hockey

Representing Sweden

World Championships
| Silver medal – second place | 1997 Helsinki | |
| Silver medal – second place | 2003 Helsinki | |
| Silver medal – second place | 2004 Prague | |
| Bronze medal – third place | 2002 Gothenburg | |

World Junior Championships
| Silver medal – second place | 1989 Anchorage | |

| Year | Team | Event | GP | G | A | Pts | PIM |
|---|---|---|---|---|---|---|---|
| 1988 | Sweden | EJC | 6 | 4 | 9 | 13 | 2 |
| 1989 | Sweden | EJC | 6 | 6 | 3 | 9 | 8 |
| 1989 | Sweden | WJC | 7 | 2 | 0 | 2 | 0 |
| 1990 | Sweden | WJC | 7 | 3 | 3 | 6 | 6 |
| 1991 | Sweden | CC | 6 | 0 | 1 | 1 | 0 |
| 1991 | Sweden | WJC | 7 | 5 | 3 | 8 | 8 |
| 1996 | Sweden | WC | 6 | 1 | 1 | 2 | 8 |
| 1996 | Sweden | WCH | 1 | 0 | 0 | 0 | 0 |
| 1997 | Sweden | WC | 11 | 0 | 2 | 2 | 9 |
| 2002 | Sweden | WC | 8 | 3 | 2 | 5 | 2 |
| 2003 | Sweden | WC | 9 | 1 | 5 | 6 | 4 |
| 2004 | Sweden | WC | 9 | 1 | 1 | 2 | 2 |
| Junior totals | | | 33 | 20 | 18 | 38 | 24 |
| Senior totals | | | 50 | 6 | 12 | 18 | 24 |

| Preceded by Henrik Zetterberg | Golden Puck; 2003 | Succeeded by Johan Davidsson |
| Preceded by Jonas Johnson | Frölunda HC captains 2008–2009 | Succeeded by Joel Lundqvist |
