= Linus Fagemo =

Swedish ice hockey player

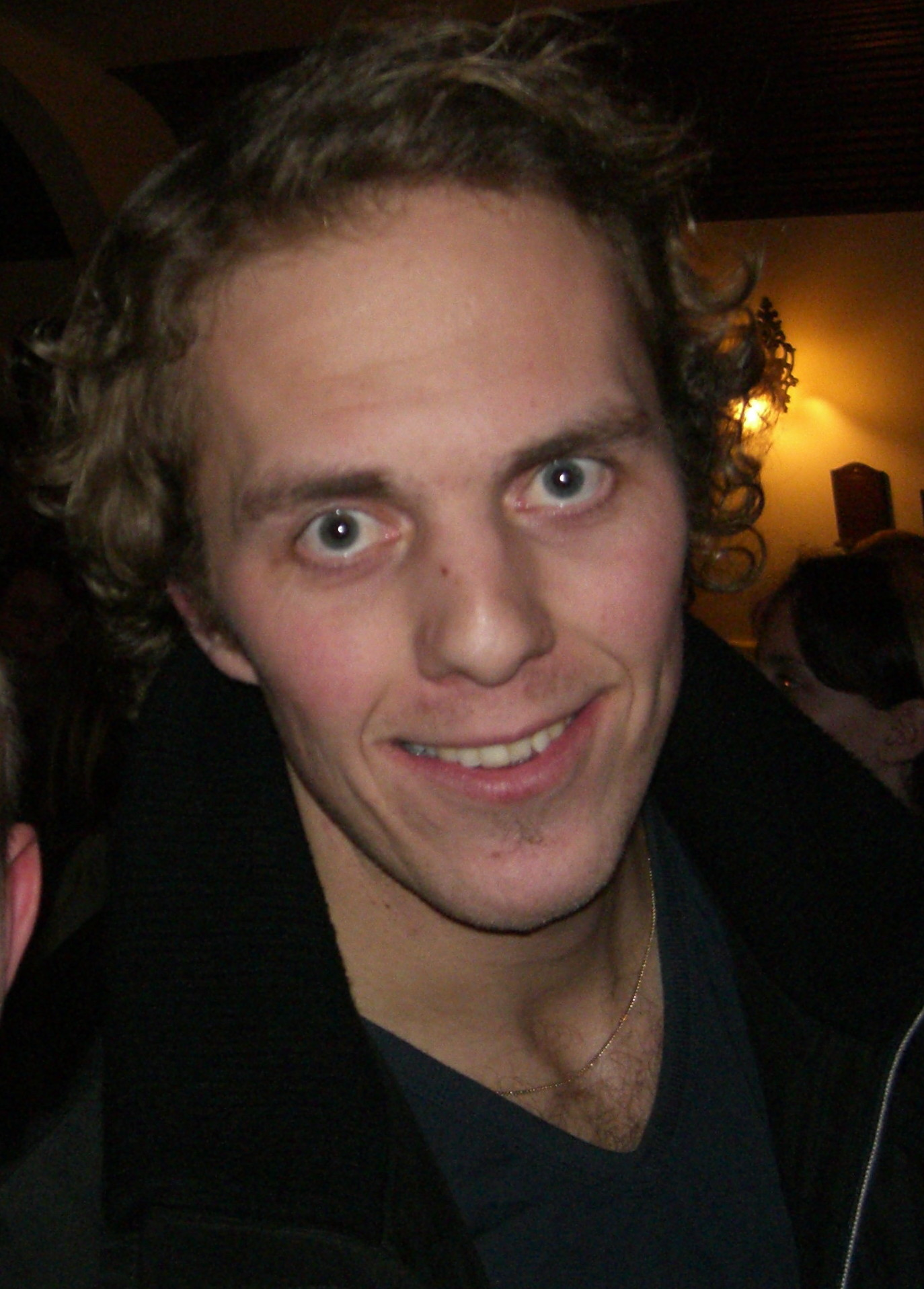
- Born: 5 March 1977 (age 48) Trollhättan, Sweden
- Height: 6 ft 0 in (183 cm)
- Weight: 196 lb (89 kg; 14 st 0 lb)
- Position: Left wing
- Shot: Left
- Played for: Frölunda HC; Timra IK; Luleå HF; Iserlohn Roosters; Malmö Redhawks; Herning Blue Fox
- Playing career: 1997–2012

Linus Fagemo (born 5 March 1977) is a Swedish former professional ice hockey winger who played in the Elitserien for Frölunda HC, Timra IK, Luleå HF and Malmö Redhawks.

== Personal life ==
Fagemo's son, Samuel Fagemo, currently plays for the Winnipeg Jets in the National Hockey League and previously played for the Frölunda HC in the Swedish Hockey League.
