= John Klingberg =

Swedish ice hockey player (born 1992)

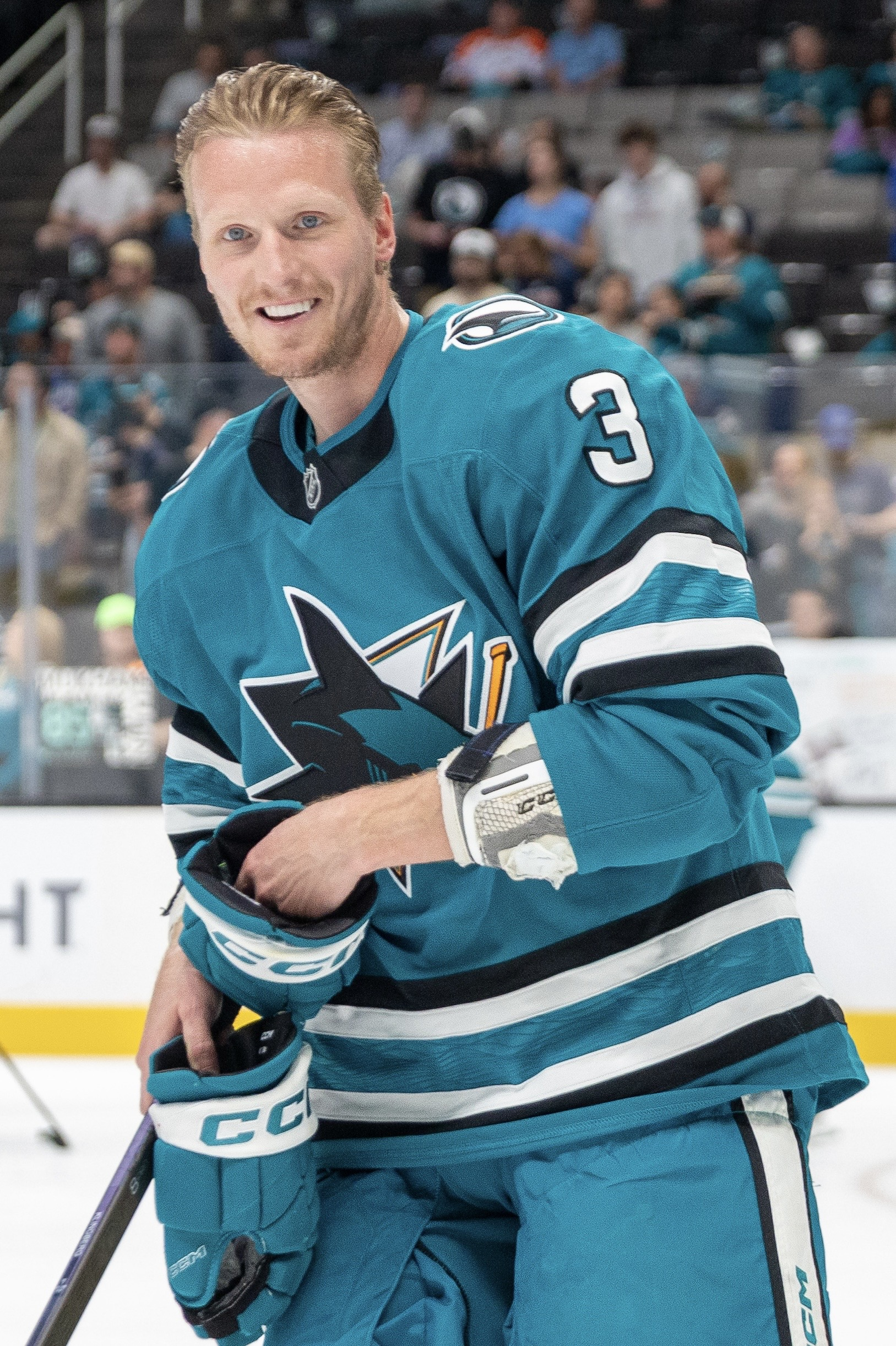
- Klingberg with the San Jose Sharks in 2026
- Born: 14 August 1992 (age 34) Gothenburg, Sweden
- Height: 6 ft 2 in (188 cm)
- Weight: 185 lb (84 kg; 13 st 3 lb)
- Position: Defence
- Shot: Right
- Played for: Frölunda HC; Jokerit; Skellefteå AIK; Dallas Stars; Anaheim Ducks; Minnesota Wild; Toronto Maple Leafs; Edmonton Oilers; San Jose Sharks
- National team: Sweden
- NHL draft: 131st overall, 2010; Dallas Stars
- Playing career: 2010–2026

John Andersson Klingberg (born 14 August 1992) is a Swedish former professional ice hockey player. A defenceman, he played 12 seasons in the National Hockey League (NHL), most notably for the Dallas Stars, who drafted him 131st overall in the 2010 NHL entry draft. A high-performing offensive defenceman during his peak with Dallas, Klingberg would later play short stints for the Anaheim Ducks, Minnesota Wild, Toronto Maple Leafs, Edmonton Oilers, and San Jose Sharks. He is the younger brother of Carl Klingberg.

== Playing career ==
Klingberg started his career early in Lerums BK, then signed as a youth to join the Frölunda HC program. He made his Elitserien debut for Frölunda HC on 21 September 2010, against AIK.

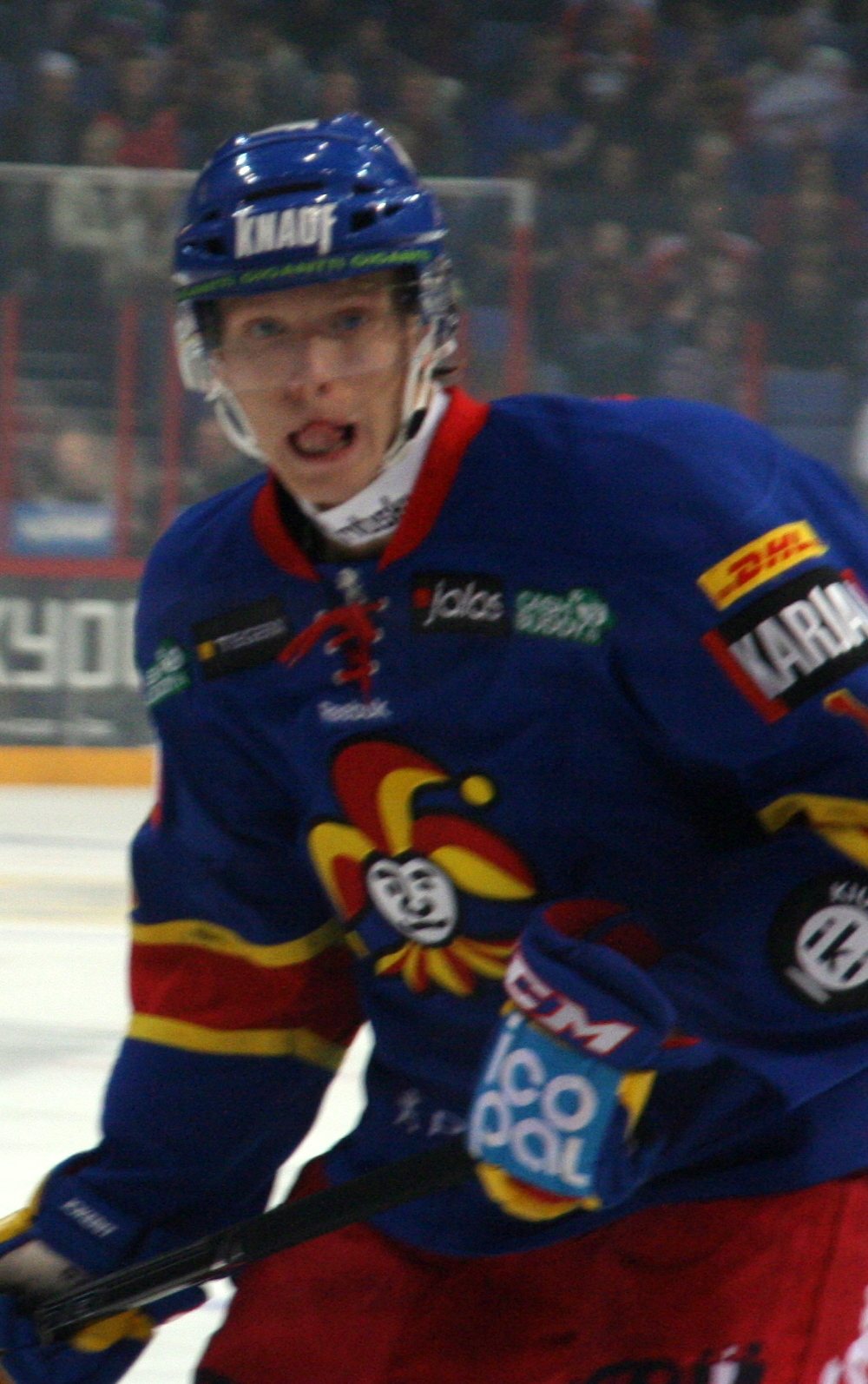
Klingberg with Jokerit in September 2011

On 16 May 2011, the Dallas Stars announced that they had signed Klingberg to a three-year entry-level contract. He was then loaned to the Finnish SM-liiga to play with Jokerit in the 2011–12 season before returning to Sweden midway through the campaign to Skellefteå AIK.

In the 2013–14 season, Klingberg opted to play on loan with Frölunda HC and produced a career-high 11 goals and 28 points in 50 games. After post-season elimination, Klingberg was assigned to the Stars' American Hockey League (AHL) affiliate, the Texas Stars, and played in three regular season games.

In his first full North American season in 2014–15, Klingberg remained with Texas to begin the year. After being recalled by the Stars, he made his NHL debut in a 4–3 victory over the Arizona Coyotes on 11 November 2014. Klingberg scored his first NHL goal on 20 November 2014, against Mike Smith of the Arizona Coyotes. Klingberg finished first in points among all rookie defenceman in 2014–15 and was named to the NHL all-rookie team.

The Stars qualified for the 2016 Stanley Cup playoffs. They defeated the Minnesota Wild in the first-round before falling to the St. Louis Blues in the second. Overall, Klingberg recorded one goal and three assists in 13 games.

After ranking first among NHL defencemen, Klingberg was named to the 2018 NHL All-Star Game, along with teammate Tyler Seguin. He finished the year with a career-high 67 points in 82 games.

On 9 November 2018, Klingberg underwent hand surgery, sidelining him for at least four weeks. He returned on 20 December in a 5–2 loss to the Chicago Blackhawks. Despite missing a total of 18 games, Klingberg recorded ten goals and 45 points.

During the Stars' first-round match-up against the Nashville Predators in the 2019 Stanley Cup playoffs, Klingberg scored the series-winning overtime goal in game six to advance.

An unrestricted free agent at the end of the 2021–22 season, contract negotiations fell through with Dallas during the season after Klingberg and his agent turned down an 8 year contract with an average value of roughly $7 million, instead seeking out an annual cap hit of $8 million at 8 years. After failing to attract interest in a long-term deal during the opening weeks of free agency, Klingberg fired his agent and hired new representation; a lengthy contract never materialized and on 29 July 2022, Klingberg ultimately signed a one-year, $7 million contract with the Anaheim Ducks. In the 2022–23 season, Klingberg was leant upon heavily for the rebuilding Ducks, and struggled to match his career scoring pace however still led the Anaheim blueline with eight goals and 24 points in 50 games approaching the NHL trade deadline. On 3 March 2023, as an expiring contract, Klingberg was dealt by the Ducks to the Minnesota Wild in exchange for Andrej Šustr, the rights to prospect Nikita Nesterenko and a 2025 fourth-round draft pick.

Leaving the Wild as a free agent, Klingberg joined his third club in short succession after he was signed to a one-year, $4.15 million contract by the Toronto Maple Leafs on 1 July 2023. Klingberg recorded 5 points in his first 6 games with the team, but then went scoreless in his next 9 with relatively poor play; on 23 November, the Maple Leafs placed Klingberg on long-term injured reserve due to hip injury. General Manager Brad Treliving revealed that Klingberg had been injured during an early team road trip to Florida in October, and had been playing through the injury for the past month. On 7 December, Treliving revealed that Klingberg was to undergo hip surgery at the end of the month and would not play again for the rest of the season.

After going unsigned through the summer, it was announced on 17 January 2025, that Klingberg had signed with the Edmonton Oilers for the remainder of the 2024–25 NHL season, on a $1 million contract for the partial season. His entry into Canada was initially delayed due to issues with his immigration documentation. He moved to the San Jose Sharks in July 2025, signing a one-year, $4 million contract.

Klingberg announced his retirement on 11 September 2026. He finished his career with 92 goals and 443 points in 700 regular-season games across 12 seasons, as well as nine goals and 43 points in 82 postseason games.

== Personal life ==
Klingberg was born in Gothenburg, Sweden, to Anders Klingberg. His father, Anders, is also active in hockey and was a head coach for Göteborg during TV-pucken, a Swedish ice hockey tournament. Klingberg also has two brothers who play hockey; Carl who currently plays for Ilves of Liiga and Olle, who is now retired.

== Career statistics ==
=== Regular season and playoffs ===
			Regular season					Playoffs
Season	Team	League	GP	G	A	Pts	PIM	GP	G	A	Pts	PIM
2008–09	Frölunda HC	J18	16	3	8	11	8	—	—	—	—	—
2008–09	Frölunda HC	J18 Allsv	14	0	4	4	4	3	0	0	0	0
2009–10	Frölunda HC	J18	10	2	4	6	12	—	—	—	—	—
2009–10	Frölunda HC	J18 Allsv	10	1	9	10	10	7	2	9	11	10
2009–10	Frölunda HC	J20	27	0	5	5	32	5	1	0	1	6
2010–11	Frölunda HC	J20	13	3	14	17	29	7	1	10	11	6
2010–11	Frölunda HC	SEL	26	0	5	5	10	—	—	—	—	—
2010–11	Borås HC	Allsv	7	1	0	1	2	—	—	—	—	—
2011–12	Jokerit	FIN U20	1	0	0	0	0	—	—	—	—	—
2011–12	Jokerit	SM-l	20	1	2	3	8	—	—	—	—	—
2011–12	Kiekko-Vantaa	Mestis	6	1	4	5	0	—	—	—	—	—
2011–12	Skellefteå AIK	SEL	16	1	3	4	6	16	0	4	4	14
2012–13	Skellefteå AIK	J20	1	0	0	0	0	—	—	—	—	—
2012–13	Skellefteå AIK	SEL	25	1	12	13	6	13	1	3	4	8
2012–13	Texas Stars	AHL	—	—	—	—	—	1	0	0	0	0
2013–14	Frölunda HC	SHL	50	11	17	28	12	7	0	4	4	2
2013–14	Texas Stars	AHL	3	0	1	1	4	—	—	—	—	—
2014–15	Texas Stars	AHL	10	4	8	12	6	—	—	—	—	—
2014–15	Dallas Stars	NHL	65	11	29	40	32	—	—	—	—	—
2015–16	Dallas Stars	NHL	76	10	48	58	30	13	1	3	4	2
2016–17	Dallas Stars	NHL	80	13	36	49	34	—	—	—	—	—
2017–18	Dallas Stars	NHL	82	8	59	67	26	—	—	—	—	—
2018–19	Dallas Stars	NHL	64	10	35	45	12	13	2	7	9	6
2019–20	Dallas Stars	NHL	58	6	26	32	22	26	4	17	21	14
2020–21	Dallas Stars	NHL	53	7	29	36	23	—	—	—	—	—
2021–22	Dallas Stars	NHL	74	6	41	47	34	7	0	1	1	26
2022–23	Anaheim Ducks	NHL	50	8	16	24	30	—	—	—	—	—
2022–23	Minnesota Wild	NHL	17	2	7	9	4	4	1	3	4	0
2023–24	Toronto Maple Leafs	NHL	14	0	5	5	8	—	—	—	—	—
2024–25	Edmonton Oilers	NHL	11	1	3	4	8	19	1	3	4	2
2025–26	San Jose Sharks	NHL	56	10	17	27	24	—	—	—	—	—
SHL totals			117	13	37	50	34	36	1	11	12	24
NHL totals			700	92	351	443	287	82	9	34	43	50

=== International ===
Medal record

Representing Sweden

Ice hockey

World Championships
Gold medal – first place	2017 Germany/France	
Gold medal – first place	2018 Denmark	

World Junior Championships
Gold medal – first place	2012 Canada	

Year	Team	Event	Result	GP	G	A	Pts	PIM
2011	Sweden	WJC	4th	6	1	1	2	0
2012	Sweden	WJC	1st place, gold medalist(s)	6	0	3	3	4
2015	Sweden	WC	5th	7	2	4	6	0
2017	Sweden	WC	1st place, gold medalist(s)	10	2	4	6	2
2018	Sweden	WC	1st place, gold medalist(s)	10	1	5	6	4
2019	Sweden	WC	5th	5	2	2	4	2
Junior totals				12	1	4	5	4
Senior totals				32	7	15	22	8

== Awards and achievements ==
Award	Year
SHL
Le Mat Trophy champion	2013
NHL
All-Rookie Team	2015
All-Star Game	2018
International
Best Defenceman	2018
