= William Wallén =

Swedish professional ice hockey forward (born 1991)

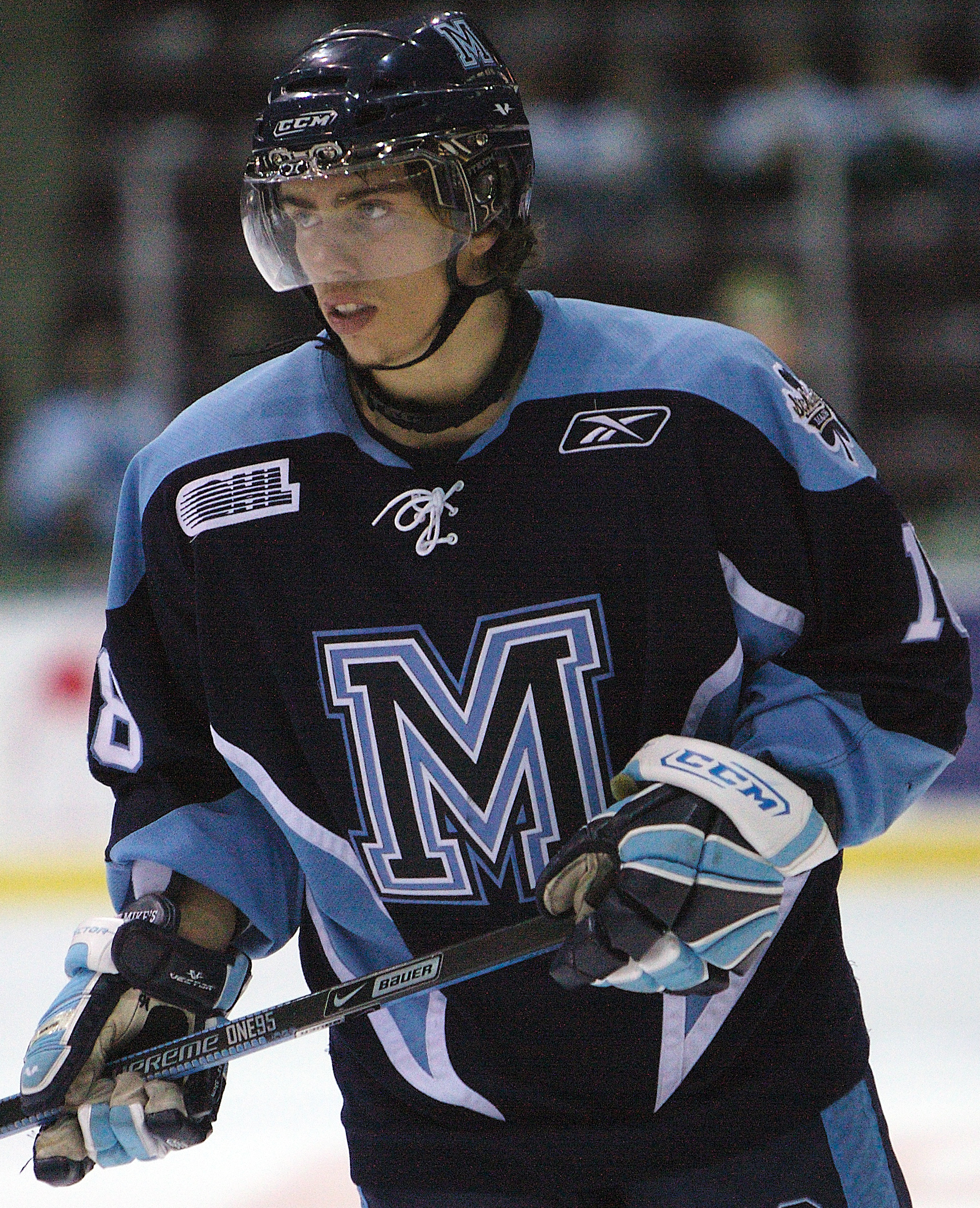
- Wallén with the Mississauga St. Michael's Majors in 2009
- Born: 16 August 1991 (age 35) Stockholm, Sweden
- Height: 5 ft 9 in (175 cm)
- Weight: 170 lb (77 kg; 12 st 2 lb)
- Position: Winger
- Shoots: Right
- SM-liiga team: Jokerit
- National team: Sweden
- Playing career: 2010–present

William Wallén (born 16 August 1991) is a Swedish professional ice hockey forward.

== Playing career ==
During the 2005–06 season at age 14 Wallén played for Stocksunds IF's under 18 team, he scored 17 goals and 22 points in 12 games of the J18 Elit and ten goals, 13 points in 11 games of the J18 Allsvenskan. For the 2006–07 season Wallén joined Djurgårdens IF, continuing his success in the under 18 leagues with 21 goals and 36 points in 18 games of the J18 Elit and seven goals, 14 points in 13 games of the J18 Allsvenskan. In the Swedish Championship playoffs Djurgården's under 18 team were eliminated in the quarterfinals, Wallén then joined Djurgården's under 16 team and lead them to win the Swedish Championship title by scoring 13 goals and 18 points in five playoff games.

The following season Wallén represented Stockholm in TV-pucken, Stockholm lost the final to Småland but Wallén who had scored 12 points in eight games was awarded Sven Tumbas Stipendium as the tournament's best forward. As a 16-year-old he was brought up to play for Djurgården's under 20 team in the J20 SuperElit, scoring 18 goals and 38 points in 35 games, the highest point total by an underage player that season. In the playoffs Djurgården's under 20 team were eliminated in the quarterfinals, the under 18 team won the Swedish Championship title with Wallén scoring three goals and five points in seven games.

For the 2008–09 season Wallén joined the Mississauga St. Michael's Majors of the Ontario Hockey League (OHL). In the Majors' home premier on 3 October Wallén suffered severe headache and nausea by the end of the game, after the game ended he was taken to the hospital by ambulance where doctors diagnosed an aneurysm. He underwent two surgeries and made a full recovery. In January he returned to action, scoring one goal and an assist in his comeback. He finished the regular season with 11 goals and 22 points in 30 games, and added another two goals and four points in 11 playoff games.

The following season Wallén appeared in 67 regular season games, scoring 14 goals 41 points and one goal two points in ten playoff games. In 2010 Wallén returned to Sweden, signing a two-year contract with Frölunda HC of Elitserien. He scored his first goal in a shootout after game four, securing Frölunda's first win at home of the season.

Wallén signed a try-out contract with Jokerit of Finland's SM-liiga for the 2011–12 season. He appeared in three games for Jokerit in the 2011 European Trophy, scoring one goal against his former team Frölunda, but was not offered an extension on his try-out contract. Wallén returned to Almtuna, but was released on 28 December.

== Career statistics ==
=== Regular season and playoffs ===
			Regular season					Playoffs
Season	Team	League	GP	G	A	Pts	PIM	GP	G	A	Pts	PIM
2007–08	Djurgårdens IF	J20	35	18	20	38	14	3	1	1	2	0
2008–09	Mississauga St. Michael's Majors	OHL	30	11	11	22	10	11	2	2	4	8
2009–10	Mississauga St. Michael's Majors	OHL	67	14	27	41	21	10	1	1	2	6
2010–11	Frölunda HC	SEL	12	1	0	1	0	—	—	—	—	—
2010–11	Frölunda HC	J20	1	0	0	0	0	—	—	—	—	—
2010–11	Borås HC	Allsv	26	6	3	9	8	—	—	—	—	—
2010–11	Almtuna IS	Allsv	12	10	1	11	0	6	1	1	2	2
OHL totals			97	25	38	63	31	21	3	3	6	14

=== International ===
Year	Team	Event	GP	G	A	Pts	PIM
2009	Sweden	WJC U18	4	2	6	8	0
Junior int' totals			39	20	30	50	57
