= Patric Blomdahl =

Swedish ice hockey player (born 1984)

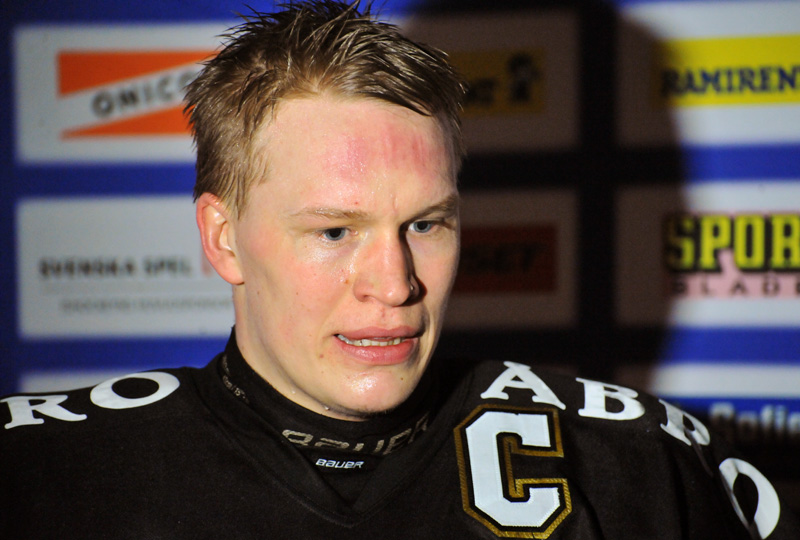
- Born: 30 January 1984; Stockholm, Sweden
- Height: 6 ft 1 in (185 cm)
- Weight: 220 lb (100 kg; 15 st 10 lb)
- Position: Left/Right Wing
- Shot: Left
- Played for: AIK IF; Linköpings HC; Frölunda HC
- NHL draft: 272nd overall, 2002; Washington Capitals
- Playing career: 2002–2015

Patric Bo Linus Blomdahl (born 30 January 1984) is a Swedish former professional ice hockey winger, who began and concluded his playing career for AIK of the Swedish Hockey League (SHL).

Blomdahl spent four years with Linköpings HC, winning Swedish Championship silver medals in each of his two last seasons, before signing a two-year contract with Frölunda HC in 2008. Blomdahl returned to AIK in 2010.

== Career statistics ==
=== Regular season and playoffs ===
			Regular season					Playoffs
Season	Team	League	GP	G	A	Pts	PIM	GP	G	A	Pts	PIM
2000–01	AIK	J18 Allsv	9	5	1	6	35	—	—	—	—	—
2001–02	AIK	J18 Allsv	3	0	0	0	2	3	0	1	1	4
2001–02	AIK	J20	20	6	7	13	18	4	0	0	0	4
2002–03	AIK	J20	19	6	5	11	109	—	—	—	—	—
2002–03	AIK	Allsv	21	1	1	2	14	7	1	0	1	4
2003–04	AIK	J20	5	2	1	3	6	—	—	—	—	—
2003–04	AIK	Allsv	42	8	4	12	46	6	1	1	2	0
2004–05	IK Nyköpings Hockey	Allsv	37	3	1	4	54	10	4	4	8	10
2004–05	Linköpings HC	SEL	4	0	0	0	4	—	—	—	—	—
2005–06	Linköpings HC	J20	1	1	2	3	0	—	—	—	—	—
2005–06	Linköpings HC	SEL	45	3	0	3	93	13	1	0	1	94
2006–07	Linköpings HC	SEL	47	0	1	1	106	15	6	3	9	12
2007–08	Linköpings HC	SEL	52	7	3	10	100	16	4	2	6	36
2008–09	Frölunda HC	SEL	48	5	2	7	116	11	0	0	0	31
2009–10	Frölunda HC	SEL	49	6	2	8	90	7	1	0	1	16
2010–11	AIK	SEL	39	3	3	6	92	8	1	0	1	10
2011–12	AIK	SEL	54	5	7	12	20	12	2	1	3	12
2012–13	AIK	SEL	34	2	2	4	51	—	—	—	—	—
2013–14	AIK	SHL	48	7	3	10	44	—	—	—	—	—
2014–15	AIK	Allsv	37	4	4	8	24	—	—	—	—	—
2017–18	Hässelby Kälvesta	SWE.6	7	15	8	23	4	1	0	2	2	0
2019–20	Hässelby Kälvesta	SWE.6	2	0	2	2	2	—	—	—	—	—
2021–22	Brödernas Hockey	SWE.6	10	10	14	24	41	3	2	2	4	4
Allsv totals			137	16	10	26	138	23	6	5	11	14
SHL totals			420	38	23	61	716	82	15	6	21	211

=== International ===
Year	Team	Event	GP	G	A	Pts	PIM
2004	Sweden	WJC	4	2	0	2	20
Junior totals			4	2	0	2	20
