= Casper Carning =

Swedish professional ice hockey forward

- Born: March 7, 1991 (age 34) Gothenburg, Sweden
- Height: 6 ft 2 in (188 cm)
- Weight: 203 lb (92 kg; 14 st 7 lb)
- Position: Right wing
- Shoots: Left
- Division 1 team: Kungälvs IK
- Playing career: 2009–present

Casper Carning (born March 7, 1991) is a Swedish professional ice hockey forward, currently playing for Kungälvs IK in Division 1.

== Playing career ==
Carning won the TV-pucken tournament with Göteborg (Gothenburg) in 2006, the following year Carning became the tournament leading point and goal scorer but his team was eliminated in the quarterfinals. Playing for Frölunda HC in the J20 SuperElit he help the team winning the Swedish Championship's Anton Cup during the 2007–08 season. Carning was loaned from Frölunda to their HockeyAllsvenskan affiliate Borås HC for the 2009–10 season. On October 16, 2009, Carning was involved in an incident in a game against Mora IK, where he body checked Mora's Mikael Owilli who suffered a broken femur from the collision—Carning received a minor penalty for boarding.

== Career statistics ==
=== Regular season and playoffs ===
			Regular season					Playoffs
Season	Team	League	GP	G	A	Pts	PIM	GP	G	A	Pts	PIM
2007–08	Frölunda HC	J20	24	4	8	12	41	2	0	0	0	0
2008–09	Frölunda HC	J20	38	10	17	27	74	5	2	2	4	2
2008–09	Frölunda HC	SEL	2	0	0	0	0	—	—	—	—	—
2009–10	Frölunda HC	J20	16	7	10	17	10	3	0	1	1	0
2009–10	Borås HC	Allsv	26	4	4	8	12	—	—	—	—	—
2010–11	Vancouver Giants	WHL	6	0	2	2	2	—	—	—	—	—
2010–11	Frölunda HC	J20	31	14	29	43	103	7	2	4	6	14
2010–11	Frölunda HC	SEL	8	0	0	0	0	—	—	—	—	—
2010–11	Kungälvs IK	Div 1	2	1	1	2	2	—	—	—	—	—
J20 totals			109	35	64	99	228	17	4	7	11	16
