= Carl Klingberg =

Swedish ice hockey player (born 1991)

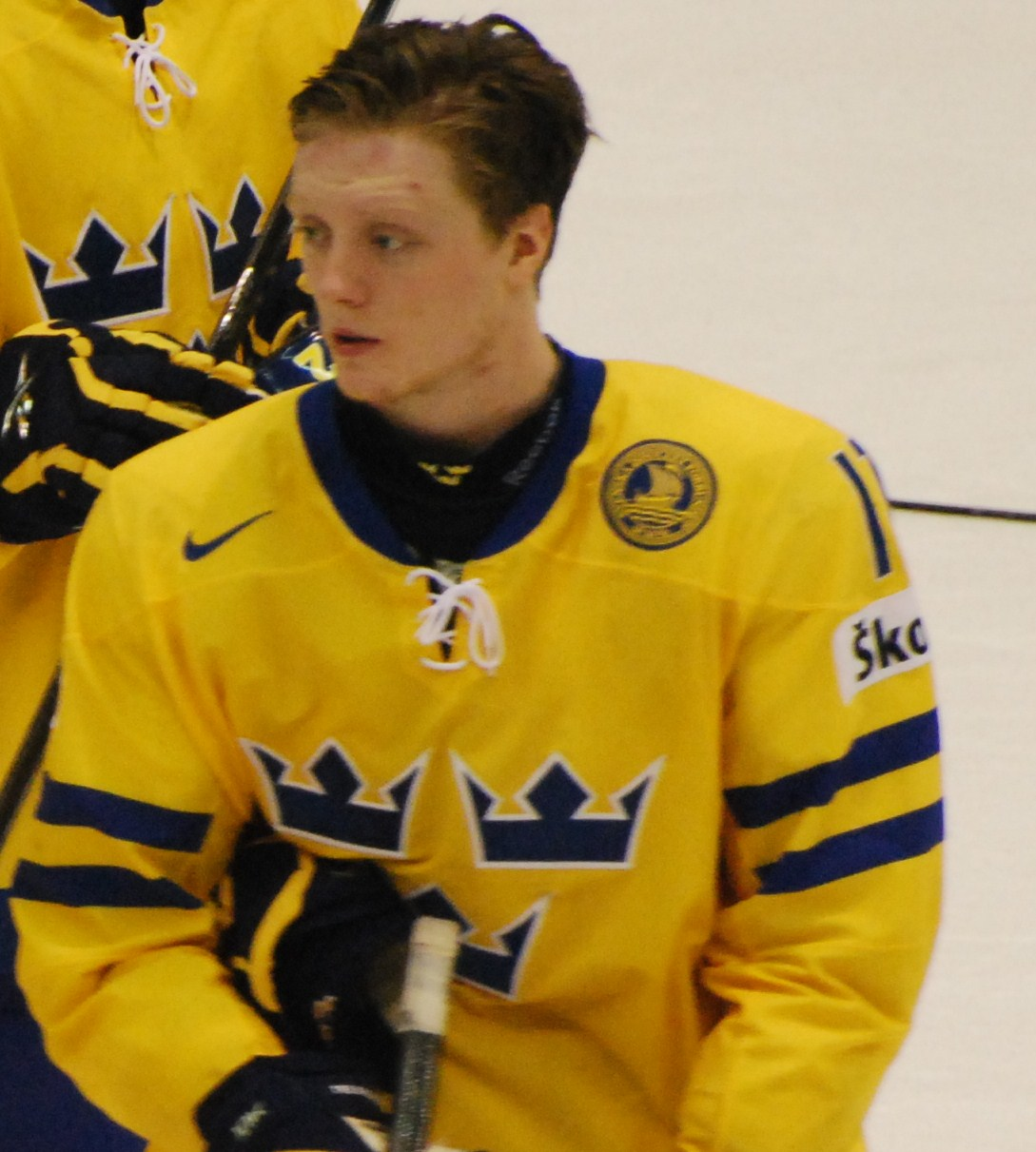
- Klingberg with Sweden in 2010
- Born: 28 January 1991 (age 35) Gothenburg, Sweden
- Height: 6 ft 3 in (191 cm)
- Weight: 212 lb (96 kg; 15 st 2 lb)
- Position: Right wing
- Shoots: Right
- Liiga team Former teams: Ilves; Timrå IK; Atlanta Thrashers; Winnipeg Jets; Torpedo Nizhny Novgorod; EV Zug; Frölunda HC
- National team: Sweden
- NHL draft: 34th overall, 2009; Atlanta Thrashers
- Playing career: 2008–present

Carl Klingberg (born 28 January 1991) is a Swedish professional ice hockey forward for Ilves of the Finnish Liiga.

== Early life ==
Klingberg was born on 28 January 1991 in Gothenburg, Sweden, and started playing ice hockey at an early age for Lerums BK. He has two younger brothers, both of whom are active hockey players as defencemen – John, who was drafted 131st overall in the 2010 NHL entry draft by the Dallas Stars, and Olle, who is playing with Lerums BK.

== Playing career ==
Klingberg made his debut in Sweden's top-tier SHL for Frölunda HC during the 2008–09 season. He was drafted in the second round, 34th overall, by the Atlanta Thrashers in the 2009 NHL entry draft. After having finished the 2010–11 season with Timrå, Klingberg joined the Thrashers' American Hockey League (AHL) affiliate the Chicago Wolves. He made his AHL debut on 19 March in a 3–4 loss against the Oklahoma City Barons, and scored his first goal on 27 March in a 2–3 loss against the Rockford Icehogs. Klingberg was called up by the Thrashers to make his NHL debut in their last game of the season—and the franchise's last game as the Thrashers—on 10 April against the Pittsburgh Penguins.

In the off-season, the Thrashers were sold and relocated to Winnipeg, Manitoba, where they became the second incarnation of the Winnipeg Jets. Klingberg's goal was to start the season with the Jets in the NHL, but on 30 September he was assigned to the Jets' AHL affiliate the St. John's IceCaps. Klingberg scored a goal in the IceCaps 4–1 win in their premier game against the Providence Bruins. He scored the IceCaps first goal on home ice, and another two for a hattrick in the IceCaps 6–2 win against the Hamilton Bulldogs, and another two goals in a 4–3 win over the Bridgeport Sound Tigers a few days later to start the season with six goals in six games. After having scored nine goals and 16 points in 20 games Klingberg was called up to the Jets, where he played six games in the NHL before being reassigned back to the IceCaps after the Jets had acquired forward Antti Miettinen off waivers.

Klingberg scored his first NHL goal on 11 April 2014 against Karri Ramo of the Calgary Flames.

In the 2014–15 season, Klingberg could not solidify a roster spot with the Jets. On 1 March 2015, he was traded to the New York Rangers for forward Lee Stempniak. Klingberg was assigned to the Rangers' AHL affiliate, the Hartford Wolf Pack for the remainder of the season. He contributed offensively with 11 points in 13 games.

Without featuring for the Rangers, Klingberg, an impending restricted free agent, signed a one-year contract with Russian-based Torpedo Nizhny Novgorod of the KHL on 21 June 2015. Following the 2015–16 season, he moved on to Switzerland, joining EV Zug of the National League A (NLA) on a one-year deal on 30 June 2016. On 8 October 2016, Klingberg was suspended for one game and fined CHF 1,230 for a hit to the head of EHC Kloten's Matthias Bieber. On 9 January 2017, Klingberg was once again suspended for one game by the SIHF and fined CHF 1,230 for a slew-footing on HC Ambrì-Piotta's Janne Pesonen. On 2 May 2017, Klingberg agreed to a two-year contract extension with the Bulls. On 21 May 2019, Klingberg was signed to a two-year contract extension by Zug. On 26 June 2021, Klingberg signed a new two-year deal to remain with Zug through the 2022/23 season.

After 12 seasons abroad, Klingberg returned to Frölunda in 2023, signing a two-year contract with the club. However, he produced only 17 points in 52 SHL regular-season games that year and was held pointless in 14 playoff contests. The following season saw an even further decline, with Klingberg scoring two goals and recording no assists through the team's first 17 games.

On 23 November 2024, Klingberg was a healthy scratch for Frölunda's SHL game against Rögle BK and it was heavily rumoured that his departure from the club was imminent. The following day, it was announced that Klingberg had signed a contract with Finnish Liiga club Ilves for the remainder of the 2024-25 season plus a club option for the next season.

== International play ==
Medal record

Representing Sweden

Ice hockey

World Championships
Gold medal – first place	2017 Germany/France	

World Junior Championships
Bronze medal – third place	2010 Saskatoon	

Klingberg was selected to play for Team Sweden at the 2018 Winter Olympics. He competed in one game and Sweden finished in 5th place.

== Career statistics ==
=== Regular season and playoffs ===
			Regular season					Playoffs
Season	Team	League	GP	G	A	Pts	PIM	GP	G	A	Pts	PIM
2006–07	Frölunda HC	J18	3	3	1	4	0	—	—	—	—	—
2006–07	Frölunda HC	J18 Allsv	4	0	0	0	0	—	—	—	—	—
2006–07	Frölunda HC	J20	2	0	0	0	0	—	—	—	—	—
2007–08	Frölunda HC	J18	17	11	15	26	16	—	—	—	—	—
2007–08	Frölunda HC	J18 Allsv	14	8	9	17	6	5	2	1	3	8
2008–09	Frölunda HC	J18	2	3	0	3	0	—	—	—	—	—
2008–09	Frölunda HC	J18 Allsv	1	1	1	2	0	5	2	2	4	2
2008–09	Frölunda HC	J20	35	13	13	26	34	2	0	0	0	0
2008–09	Borås HC	Allsv	8	4	2	6	2	—	—	—	—	—
2008–09	Frölunda HC	SEL	10	2	1	3	0	—	—	—	—	—
2009–10	Borås HC	Allsv	4	0	5	5	2	—	—	—	—	—
2009–10	Frölunda HC	SEL	42	6	7	13	16	7	0	0	0	2
2010–11	Frölunda HC	SEL	38	2	1	3	12	—	—	—	—	—
2010–11	Timrå IK	SEL	11	3	2	5	2	—	—	—	—	—
2010–11	Chicago Wolves	AHL	8	1	0	1	6	—	—	—	—	—
2010–11	Atlanta Thrashers	NHL	1	0	0	0	0	—	—	—	—	—
2011–12	St. John's IceCaps	AHL	66	15	22	37	39	12	1	1	2	0
2011–12	Winnipeg Jets	NHL	6	0	0	0	4	—	—	—	—	—
2012–13	St. John's IceCaps	AHL	66	11	12	23	40	—	—	—	—	—
2013–14	St. John's IceCaps	AHL	65	22	21	43	42	21	3	5	8	14
2013–14	Winnipeg Jets	NHL	3	1	0	1	0	—	—	—	—	—
2014–15	St. John's IceCaps	AHL	51	15	15	30	41	—	—	—	—	—
2014–15	Winnipeg Jets	NHL	2	0	0	0	0	—	—	—	—	—
2014–15	Hartford Wolf Pack	AHL	13	2	9	11	4	13	4	3	7	6
2015–16	Torpedo Nizhny Novgorod	KHL	55	9	8	17	26	8	0	1	1	10
2016–17	EV Zug	NLA	47	13	14	27	52	16	4	4	8	8
2017–18	EV Zug	NL	47	18	16	34	20	5	1	1	2	2
2018–19	EV Zug	NL	29	8	14	22	10	11	2	1	3	10
2018–19	EVZ Academy	SL	1	1	1	2	0	—	—	—	—	—
2019–20	EV Zug	NL	47	13	15	28	36	—	—	—	—	—
2020–21	EV Zug	NL	50	19	20	39	75	13	6	4	10	12
2021–22	EV Zug	NL	45	15	17	32	43	7	0	0	0	2
2022–23	EV Zug	NL	38	7	18	14	10	1	1	2	6
2023–24	Frölunda HC	SHL	52	9	8	17	39	14	0	0	0	6
SHL totals			153	22	19	41	69	21	0	0	0	8
NHL totals			12	1	0	1	4	—	—	—	—	—

=== International ===
Year	Team	Event	Result	GP	G	A	Pts	PIM
2009	Sweden	WJC18	5th	6	2	2	4	0
2010	Sweden	WJC	3rd place, bronze medalist(s)	5	1	0	1	2
2011	Sweden	WJC	4th	6	3	1	4	4
2017	Sweden	WC	1st place, gold medalist(s)	6	1	1	2	4
2018	Sweden	OG	5th	1	0	0	0	0
2021	Sweden	WC	9th	2	2	1	3	2
2022	Sweden	OG	4th	6	1	2	3	0
2022	Sweden	WC	6th	8	1	1	2	6
Junior totals				17	6	3	9	6
Senior totals				23	5	5	10	12
