= Oscar Hedman =

Swedish ice hockey player (born 1986)

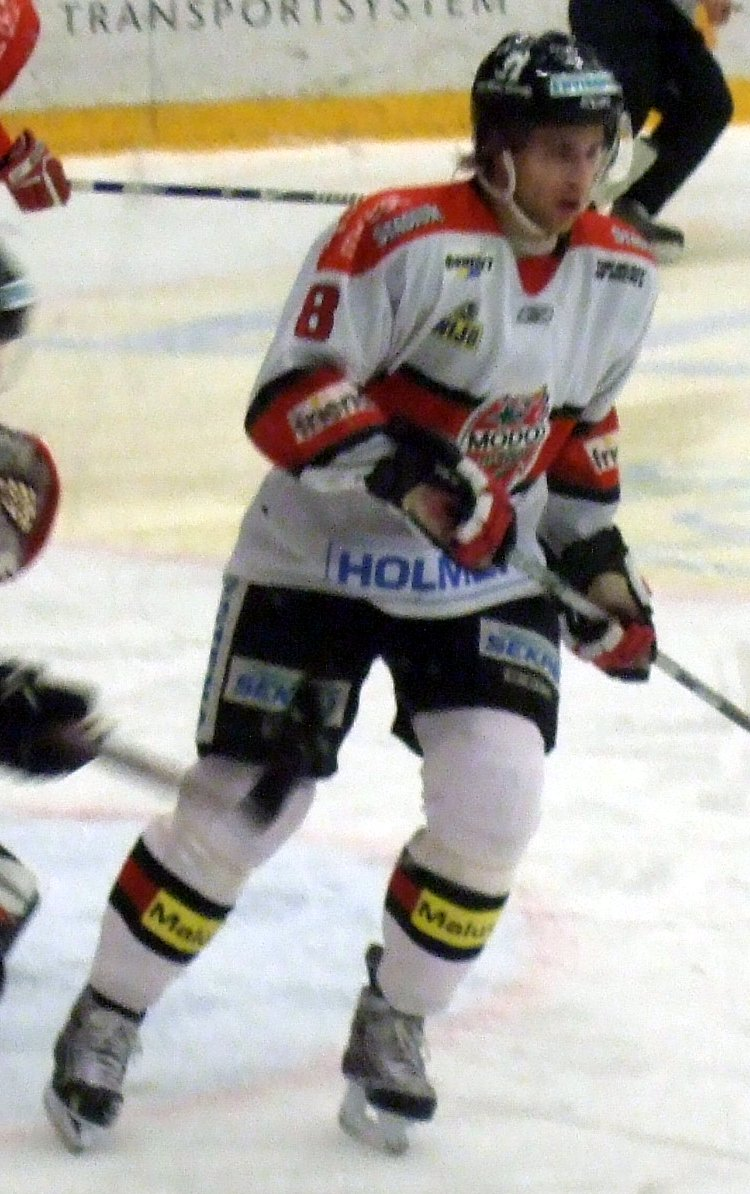
- Born: April 21, 1986 (age 40) Örnsköldsvik, Sweden
- Height: 6 ft 0 in (183 cm)
- Weight: 212 lb (96 kg; 15 st 2 lb)
- Position: Defence
- Shot: Left
- Played for: Frölunda HC; Timrå IK; Modo Hockey
- NHL draft: 132nd overall, 2004; Washington Capitals
- Playing career: 2003–2020

Oscar Erik Olof Hedman (born April 21, 1986) is a retired Swedish professional ice hockey defenceman who most recently played for Modo Hockey in HockeyAllsvenskan (Allsv). He broke into the Elitserien at just 17 years old and soon became a key player in the league. In 2007, Hedman helped Modo capture the Swedish Championship. He is the older sibling of NHL defenceman Victor Hedman.

== Playing career ==
After a standout junior career as a key player on Modo's J18 and J20 squads, Hedman made his debut in Sweden's top league, the Elitserien, with Modo in 2003 at just 17 years old. Following that season, he was selected 132nd overall by the Washington Capitals in the 2004 NHL entry draft. Hedman played a vital role in helping Modo capture the championship title in 2007. However, on November 26, 2007, during a matchup against fierce rivals Timrå IK, he suffered a concussion just seven seconds into the game after a hit from Mika Pyörälä. The impact left him lying motionless on the ice, and medical personnel placed him in a neck brace before transporting him to a nearby hospital. Throughout five straight seasons in Elitserien, Hedman consistently increased his point production.

On March 27, 2008, Hedman committed to continuing his professional career in the Swedish top-tier league by signing a two-year contract with Frölunda HC.

== International play ==
Hedman represented Sweden at the 2004 IIHF World U18 Championships, as well as the 2005 and 2006 World Junior Ice Hockey Championships, where he led all Swedish defencemen in scoring with one goal and three assists.

== Career statistics ==
=== Regular season and playoffs ===
			Regular season					Playoffs
Season	Team	League	GP	G	A	Pts	PIM	GP	G	A	Pts	PIM
2001–02	Modo Hockey	J18 Allsv	11	0	4	4	8	1	0	0	0	0
2002–03	Modo Hockey	J18 Allsv	14	4	5	9	8	6	2	1	3	32
2002–03	Modo Hockey	J20	5	0	1	1	2	—	—	—	—	—
2003–04	Modo Hockey	J18 Allsv	3	3	1	4	2	2	0	3	3	0
2003–04	Modo Hockey	J20	25	7	11	18	28	8	3	3	6	6
2003–04	Modo Hockey	SEL	24	1	2	3	6	6	0	0	0	0
2004–05	Modo Hockey	J20	7	2	2	4	12	5	0	1	1	4
2004–05	Modo Hockey	SEL	43	1	3	4	18	4	0	0	0	0
2005–06	Modo Hockey	J20	7	3	2	5	10	—	—	—	—	—
2005–06	Modo Hockey	SEL	44	3	2	5	30	5	0	1	1	0
2006–07	Modo Hockey	SEL	55	2	7	9	42	20	1	4	5	14
2007–08	Modo Hockey	SEL	53	4	9	13	30	5	1	1	2	0
2008–09	Frölunda HC	SEL	55	5	6	11	26	11	0	0	0	14
2009–10	Frölunda HC	SEL	52	2	5	7	12	7	0	0	0	0
2010–11	Frölunda HC	SEL	55	2	9	11	40	—	—	—	—	—
2011–12	Timrå IK	SEL	55	2	11	13	24	—	—	—	—	—
2012–13	Timrå IK	SEL	55	0	4	4	26	—	—	—	—	—
2013–14	Modo Hockey	SHL	53	3	7	10	14	2	0	0	0	0
2014–15	Modo Hockey	SHL	55	1	6	7	30	—	—	—	—	—
2015–16	Modo Hockey	SHL	52	3	10	13	12	—	—	—	—	—
2016–17	Modo Hockey	Allsv	52	1	2	3	28	—	—	—	—	—
2017–18	Modo Hockey	Allsv	52	6	6	12	36	—	—	—	—	—
2018–19	Modo Hockey	Allsv	50	4	6	10	53	5	0	0	0	6
2019–20	Modo Hockey	Allsv	52	0	8	8	14	2	0	0	0	0
SHL totals			651	29	81	110	310	60	2	6	8	28
Allsv totals			206	11	22	33	131	7	0	0	0	6

=== International ===
Year	Team	Event	Result	GP	G	A	Pts	PIM
2004	Sweden	WJC18	5th	6	3	1	4	0
2005	Sweden	WJC	6th	6	0	0	0	0
2006	Sweden	WJC	5th	6	1	3	4	2
Junior totals				18	4	4	8	2
