= Riku Hahl =

Finnish ice hockey player (born 1980)

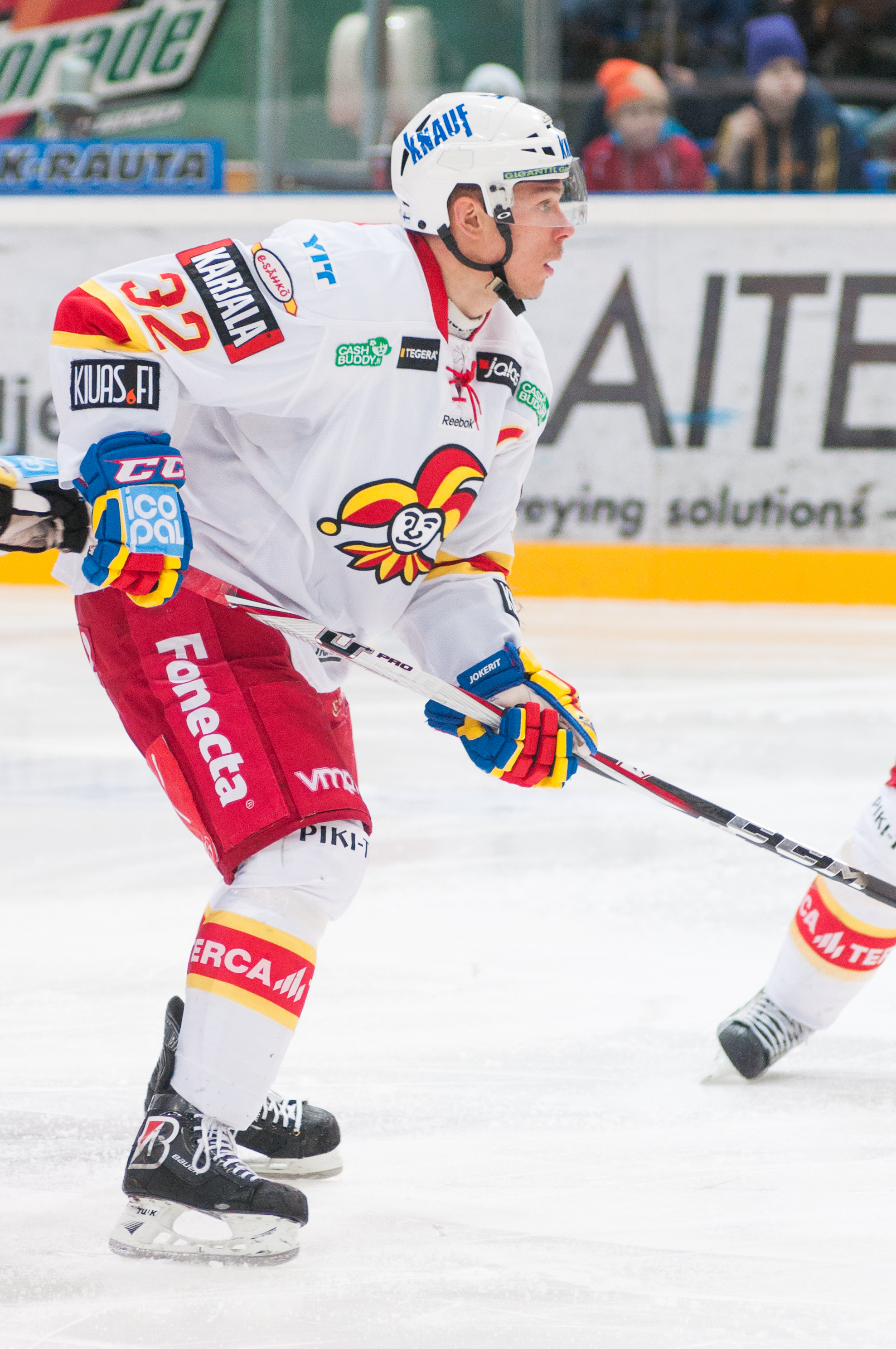
- Born: November 1, 1980 (age 45) Hämeenlinna, Finland
- Height: 6 ft 1 in (185 cm)
- Weight: 205 lb (93 kg; 14 st 9 lb)
- Position: Centre
- Shot: Left
- Played for: HPK; Colorado Avalanche; HC Davos; Timrå IK; Frölunda HC; Jokerit
- National team: Finland
- NHL draft: 183rd overall, 1999; Colorado Avalanche
- Playing career: 1998–2016

Riku Markus Hahl (born November 1, 1980) is a Finnish former professional ice hockey centre, who played most notably for HPK in the Finnish Liiga and the Colorado Avalanche in the National Hockey League (NHL).

== Playing career ==
Hahl was drafted 183rd overall in the 1999 NHL entry draft by the Colorado Avalanche.

Before coming to North America, Hahl played for his hometown team, HPK, in the Finnish SM-liiga, and was known for his defensive skills as a forward. In the autumn of 2000, Hahl left for Colorado, where he impressed the Avalanche coaches at training camp and was rewarded with 43 games in the NHL in the following season, including 21 playoff games. In his NHL career, Hahl played a total of 92 regular season games scoring five goals for a total of thirteen points. He also played 34 playoff games, recording two goals and four assists.

During the 2004–05 NHL lockout Hahl played for HPK, and represented HC Davos in the Swiss NLA during the 2005–06 season. Hahl represented Finland at the 2004 World Cup of Hockey and scored his first goal on the national team in the final against Team Canada.

Hahl signed with Timrå IK of Elitserien in the spring of 2006, and completed a two-year deal with the Medelpad team before leaving in 2008 for Frölunda HC.

After three seasons with Frölunda as an alternate captain, Hahl returned to Finland to play for Jokerit, signing a two-year deal on May 19, 2011.

Hahl played four seasons with Jokerit, including the last campaign within the Kontinental Hockey League, before opting to return to his original club in the Liiga with HPK on an optional two-year contract on July 24, 2015.

== Career statistics ==
=== Regular season and playoffs ===
			Regular season					Playoffs
Season	Team	League	GP	G	A	Pts	PIM	GP	G	A	Pts	PIM
1996–97	HPK	FIN U18	32	19	24	43	22	—	—	—	—	—
1996–97	HPK	FIN U20	2	0	1	1	2	6	2	0	2	2
1997–98	HPK	FIN U18	10	5	14	19	6	—	—	—	—	—
1997–98	HPK	FIN U20	35	13	6	19	12	—	—	—	—	—
1998–99	HPK	FIN U20	6	0	2	2	6	—	—	—	—	—
1998–99	HPK	SM-l	28	0	1	1	0	8	0	0	0	2
1999–2000	HPK	FIN U20	10	1	6	7	8	—	—	—	—	—
1999–2000	HPK	SM-l	50	4	3	7	18	8	0	0	0	2
2000–01	HPK	FIN U20	10	1	6	7	8	—	—	—	—	—
2000–01	HPK	SM-l	2	1	3	4	0	—	—	—	—	—
2001–02	Hershey Bears	AHL	52	6	17	23	16	—	—	—	—	—
2001–02	Colorado Avalanche	NHL	22	2	3	5	14	21	1	2	3	0
2002–03	Hershey Bears	AHL	28	7	7	14	17	—	—	—	—	—
2002–03	Colorado Avalanche	NHL	42	3	4	7	12	6	0	2	2	2
2003–04	Colorado Avalanche	NHL	28	0	1	1	12	7	1	0	1	2
2004–05	HPK	SM-l	44	8	13	21	12	10	2	6	8	2
2005–06	HC Davos	NLA	41	8	17	25	22	14	2	8	10	20
2006–07	Timrå IK	SEL	31	4	13	17	16	—	—	—	—	—
2007–08	Timrå IK	SEL	48	10	31	41	22	11	2	8	10	6
2008–09	Frölunda HC	SEL	52	7	24	31	22	10	1	5	6	4
2009–10	Frölunda HC	SEL	26	3	10	13	12	7	2	3	5	4
2010–11	Frölunda HC	SEL	47	4	20	24	14	—	—	—	—	—
2011–12	Jokerit	SM-l	45	9	15	24	6	10	1	5	6	6
2012–13	Jokerit	SM-l	48	5	15	20	28	5	2	2	4	0
2013–14	Jokerit	Liiga	42	4	12	16	10	—	—	—	—	—
2014–15	Jokerit	KHL	47	1	4	5	8	10	0	2	2	4
2015–16	HPK	Liiga	12	1	0	1	4	—	—	—	—	—
SM-l totals			324	34	68	102	110	42	10	11	21	14
NHL totals			92	5	8	13	38	34	2	4	6	4
SEL totals			204	28	98	126	86	29	5	16	21	14

=== International ===
Medal record

Representing Finland

World Championships
Bronze medal – third place	2006 Riga	
Bronze medal – third place	2008 Quebec City	

World Cup
Silver medal – second place	2004 Toronto	

Year	Team	Event	Result	GP	G	A	Pts	PIM
1998	Finland	EJC	2nd place, silver medalist(s)	6	1	4	5	2
1999	Finland	WJC	5th	6	0	0	0	2
2000	Finland	WJC	7th	7	0	1	1	2
2004	Finland	WCH	2nd place, silver medalist(s)	2	1	0	1	0
2005	Finland	WC	7th	5	0	0	0	2
2006	Finland	WC	3rd place, bronze medalist(s)	9	3	2	5	4
2008	Finland	WC	3rd place, bronze medalist(s)	9	0	0	0	0
2010	Finland	WC	6th	6	0	1	1	0
Junior totals				19	1	5	6	6
Senior totals				31	4	3	7	6
