= Jens Karlsson =

Swedish ice hockey player (born 1982)

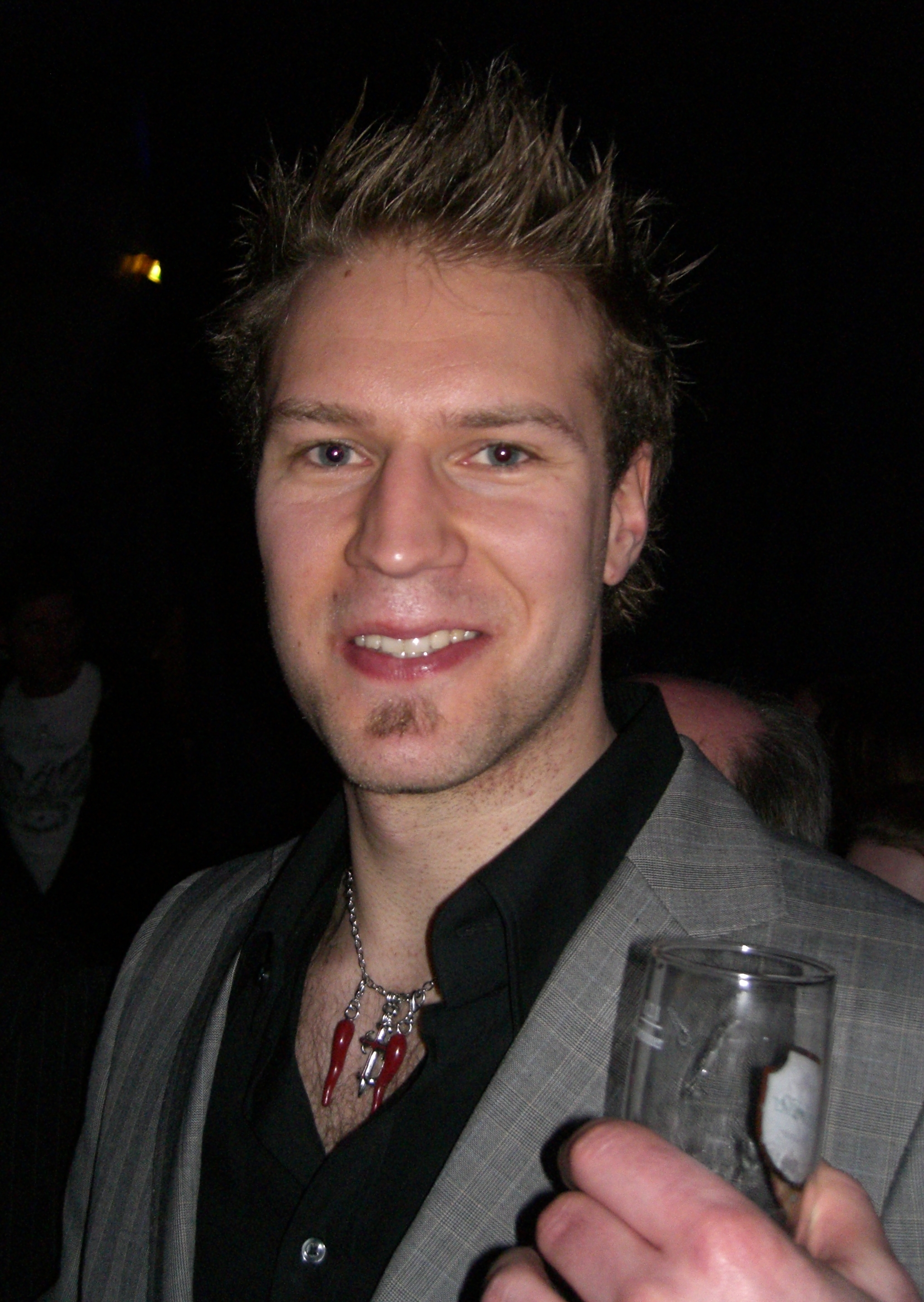
- Karlsson in 2007
- Born: 7 November 1982 (age 44) Gothenburg, Sweden
- Height: 6 ft 3 in (191 cm)
- Weight: 203 lb (92 kg; 14 st 7 lb)
- Position: Left wing
- Shot: Right
- HockeyAllsvenskan team Former teams: Borås HC; Frölunda HC; Rögle BK; HV71; Iserlohn Roosters; AaB Ishockey
- National team: Sweden
- NHL draft: 18th overall, 2001; Los Angeles Kings
- Playing career: 1997–2015

Jens Fredrik Karlsson (born 7 November 1982) is a Swedish professional ice hockey player. He is currently a left winger for Borås HC in the Swedish second division, HockeyAllsvenskan.

== Playing career ==
Previously, Karlsson played in Sweden's Elitserien for Frölunda HC and HV71 as well as Rögle BK in HockeyAllsvenskan, and the Iserlohn Roosters of the German Deutsche Eishockey Liga. Despite being drafted 18th overall in the first round of the 2001 NHL entry draft by the Los Angeles Kings, he never signed a contract with the team and never played in the NHL.

== Career statistics ==
=== Regular season and playoffs ===
			Regular season					Playoffs
Season	Team	League	GP	G	A	Pts	PIM	GP	G	A	Pts	PIM
1996–97	Göteborgs IK	SWE.3	1	0	0	0		—	—	—	—	—
1999–2000	Västra Frölunda HC	J18 Allsv	2	1	2	3	6	—	—	—	—	—
1999–2000	Västra Frölunda HC	J20	31	24	12	36	94	6	3	0	3	44
2000–01	Västra Frölunda HC	J20	14	8	8	16	68	2	0	2	2	31
2000–01	Västra Frölunda HC	SEL	19	2	0	2	4	5	1	3	4	50
2000–01	IF Mölndal Hockey	Allsv	5	1	1	2	35	—	—	—	—	—
2001–02	Västra Frölunda HC	SEL	46	6	9	15	44	10	1	0	1	18
2001–02	Västra Frölunda HC	J20	—	—	—	—	—	2	0	1	1	12
2002–03	Västra Frölunda HC	SEL	45	5	6	11	101	11	3	2	5	41
2003–04	Västra Frölunda HC	SEL	50	3	13	16	62	10	4	0	4	6
2004–05	Frölunda HC	SEL	39	1	3	4	57	6	0	0	0	2
2004–05	Rögle BK	Allsv	10	2	7	9	20	—	—	—	—	—
2005–06	HV71	SEL	45	9	8	17	101	12	1	0	1	46
2006–07	Iserlohn Roosters	DEL	50	9	12	21	126	—	—	—	—	—
2007–08	Borås HC	Allsv	44	18	20	38	120	4	1	4	5	6
2008–09	AaB Ishockey	DEN	18	6	4	10	62	—	—	—	—	—
2008–09	Borås HC	Allsv	24	9	3	12	85	—	—	—	—	—
2009–10	Borås HC	Allsv	41	14	23	37	95	—	—	—	—	—
2009–10	Frölunda HC	SEL	10	1	2	3	2	4	0	0	0	2
2010–11	Borås HC	Allsv	49	22	23	45	73	—	—	—	—	—
2011–12	Borås HC	Allsv	50	10	13	23	104	10	1	9	10	6
2012–13	Borås HC	SWE.3	33	7	16	23	60	—	—	—	—	—
2012–13	Vålerenga Ishockey	NOR	9	0	3	3	18	15	1	6	7	10
2014–15	Göteborgs IK	SWE.4	10	3	5	8	30	5	3	4	7	4
SEL totals			254	27	41	68	371	58	10	5	15	165
Allsv totals			223	76	90	166	532	14	2	13	15	12

=== International ===
Year	Team	Event	GP	G	A	Pts	PIM
2000	Sweden	WJC18	6	5	4	9	20
2002	Sweden	WJC	7	0	0	0	8
Junior totals			13	5	4	9	28

Preceded by Alexander Frolov	Los Angeles Kings first-round draft pick 2001	Succeeded by Dave Steckel
