= Janne Niskala =

Finnish ice hockey player (born 1981)

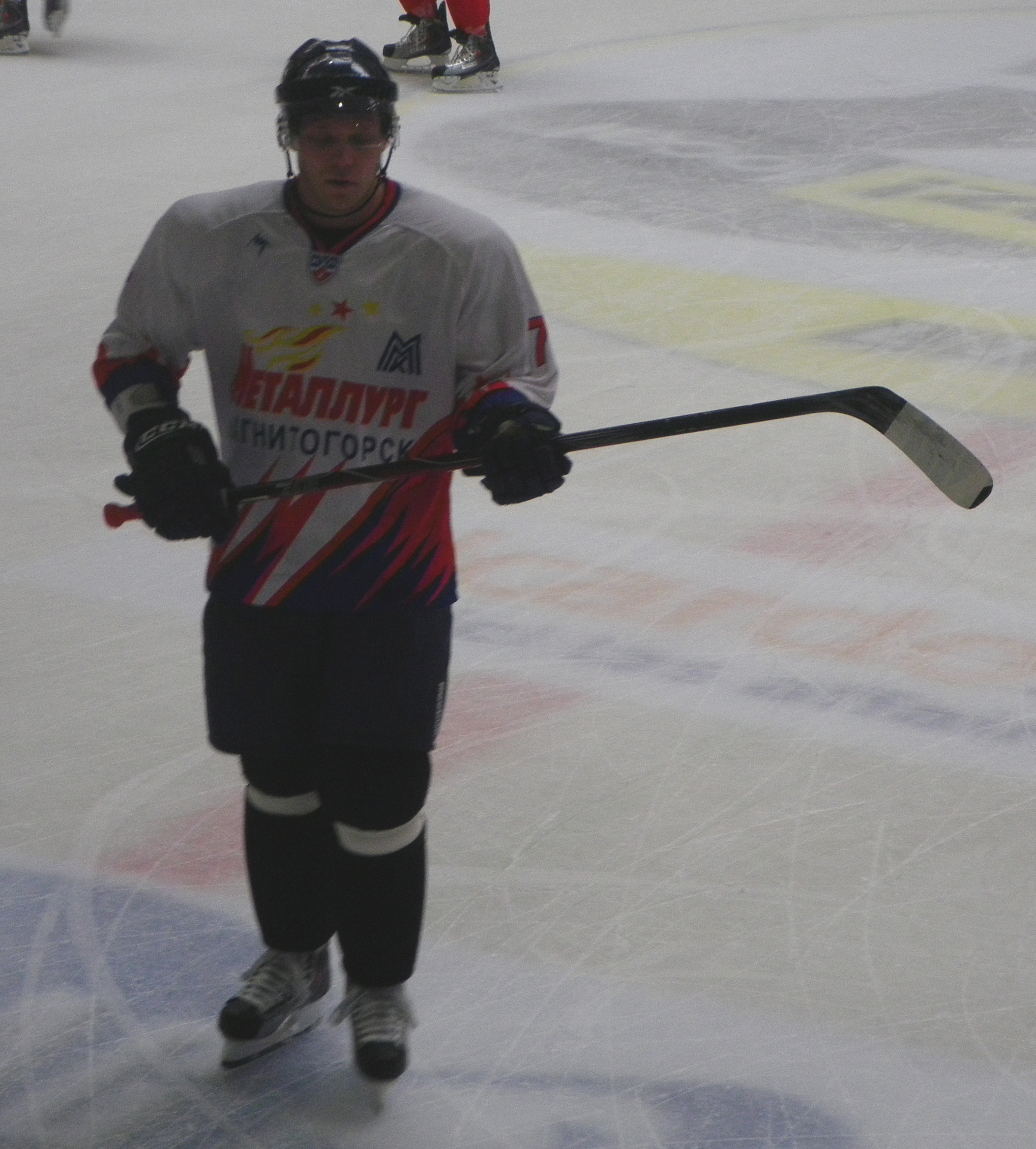
- Born: 22 September 1981 (age 45) Västerås, Sweden
- Height: 6 ft 0.5 in (184 cm)
- Weight: 187 lb (85 kg; 13 st 5 lb)
- Position: Defence
- Shot: Left
- Liiga team Former teams: Lukko; Färjestad BK; Tampa Bay Lightning; Frölunda HC; Metallurg Magnitogorsk; Atlant Moscow Oblast; HC Dinamo Minsk
- National team: Finland
- NHL draft: 147th overall, 2004; Nashville Predators
- Playing career: 2000–2019

Janne Juhani Niskala (born 22 September 1981) is a Finnish former professional ice hockey defenceman. He last played for Lukko of the Finnish Liiga.

== Playing career ==
Niskala was drafted by the Nashville Predators in the 2004 NHL entry draft in 5th round as the 147th pick overall. He is known for his good offensive skills and his power play scoring ability.

Niskala has played in Finland for the SM-liiga club Lukko for five seasons. During the 2000–01 season he played in the Finnish second tier division but also for the British club Manchester Storm. He has spent one season with the Swiss club EV Zug and one for the Swedish Elitserien club Färjestads BK. In Sweden he was reunited with his former teammate from Lukko, Esa Pirnes. During the 2006–07 season in Sweden, Niskala led all defensemen in both points and goals. He also finished first in the plus/minus statistics with a plus-25 rating.

Following his big season with Färjestad, Niskala signed a one-year contract with the Nashville Predators of the National Hockey League (NHL), but spent the entire 2007–08 season with the farm team Milwaukee Admirals of the American Hockey League (AHL). Niskala was traded to the Philadelphia Flyers on 24 June 2008 in exchange for Triston Grant and a 7th-round draft pick in the 2009 NHL entry draft. On 30 June 2008, he was traded to the Tampa Bay Lightning for a 6th-round draft pick in the 2009 NHL Entry Draft. He scored a goal in his first NHL preseason game on 20 September 2008 against the Penguins. He then scored his first NHL goal in his third NHL game, on 11 October against Michael Leighton of the Carolina Hurricanes. Niskala only play six games for the Lightning before asking to be waived since he had been cut off the roster. On 13 November, he signed a two-year contract with Frölunda HC in Elitserien.

On 4 May 2011, he moved from KHL's Metallurg Magnitogorsk to Atlant Mytishchi.

On 9 October 2012, Atlant Mytishchi traded Janne Niskala to HC Dinamo Minsk for Jonas Frögren. He returned to Atlant after completion of the 2012–13 season with Minsk.

== Career statistics ==
=== Regular season and playoffs ===
			Regular season					Playoffs
Season	Team	League	GP	G	A	Pts	PIM	GP	G	A	Pts	PIM
1997–98	Lukko	FIN U18	12	0	1	1	10	—	—	—	—	—
1998–99	Lukko	FIN U18	14	7	4	11	42	—	—	—	—	—
1998–99	Lukko	FIN U20	2	0	0	0	12	—	—	—	—	—
1999–2000	Lukko	FIN U20	40	14	15	29	50	8	0	2	2	8
2000–01	Lukko	FIN U20	13	4	8	12	40	—	—	—	—	—
2000–01	Lukko	SM-l	18	0	0	0	0	—	—	—	—	—
2000–01	UJK	FIN-2	13	4	1	5	43	—	—	—	—	—
2000–01	Manchester Storm	GBR	10	0	1	1	8	6	0	0	0	6
2001–02	Lukko	FIN U20	3	1	1	2	2	—	—	—	—	—
2001–02	Lukko	SM-l	55	7	13	20	81	—	—	—	—	—
2002–03	Lukko	SM-l	46	4	5	9	40	—	—	—	—	—
2003–04	Lukko	SM-l	55	21	15	36	73	4	0	0	0	18
2004–05	Lukko	SML	44	9	12	21	63	9	5	2	7	4
2005–06	EV Zug	NLA	44	12	17	29	50	7	0	2	2	10
2006–07	Färjestads BK	SEL	53	19	30	49	62	9	3	3	6	14
2007–08	Milwaukee Admirals	AHL	80	19	25	44	81	6	0	1	1	8
2008–09	Tampa Bay Lightning	NHL	6	1	2	3	6	—	—	—	—	—
2008–09	Frölunda HC	SEL	35	9	10	19	20	11	3	3	6	8
2009–10	Frölunda HC	SEL	50	12	16	28	34	7	3	4	7	6
2010–11	Metallurg Magnitogorsk	KHL	54	11	19	30	30	19	0	4	4	14
2011–12	Atlant Mytishchi	KHL	54	12	22	34	32	12	2	1	3	6
2012–13	Atlant Mytishchi	KHL	14	1	3	4	10	—	—	—	—	—
2012–13	Dinamo Minsk	KHL	37	6	8	14	20	—	—	—	—	—
2013–14	Atlant Mytishchi	KHL	38	2	5	7	6	—	—	—	—	—
2014–15	Lukko	Liiga	60	14	16	30	71	14	2	3	5	8
2015–16	Lukko	Liiga	56	10	24	34	46	5	0	2	2	2
2016–17	Lukko	Liiga	43	11	6	17	12	—	—	—	—	—
2017–18	Lukko	Liiga	54	9	19	28	28	—	—	—	—	—
2018–19	Lukko	Liiga	44	1	8	9	12	—	—	—	—	—
SM-l/Liiga totals			475	86	118	204	426	32	7	7	14	32
NHL totals			6	1	2	3	6	—	—	—	—	—
KHL totals			197	33	57	90	98	31	2	5	7	20

=== International ===
Medal record

Men's ice hockey

Representing Finland

Olympic Games
Bronze medal – third place	2010 Vancouver	

World Championships
Gold medal – first place	2011 Bratislava	
Bronze medal – third place	2008 Quebec	

World Junior Championships
Silver medal – second place	2001 Moscow	

Year	Team	Event	GP	G	A	Pts	PIM
2001	Finland	WJC	7	0	0	0	10
2008	Finland	WC	9	2	2	4	2
2009	Finland	WC	4	1	2	3	2
2010	Finland	OG	6	0	2	2	2
2010	Finland	WC	7	0	2	2	4
2011	Finland	WC	9	1	3	4	4
2012	Finland	WC	10	3	1	4	10
Senior totals			45	7	12	19	24
