= 2011–12 Frölunda HC season =

Swedish ice hockey club season

2011–12 Frölunda HC
- League: Regular: 5th Playoffs: 1st round Elitserien
- 2011–12 record: 22–17–16
- Home record: 15–7–6
- Road record: 7–10–10
- Goals for: 140
- Goals against: 113

Team information
- General manager: Kent Johansson
- Coach: Kent Johansson
- Assistant coach: Christian Lechtaler
- Captain: Joel Lundqvist
- Alternate captains: Per-Johan Axelsson; Fredrik Pettersson
- Arena: Scandinavium
- Average attendance: Regular: 10,482; Playoffs: 10,941

Team leaders
- Goals: Mika Pyörälä (22)
- Assists: Mathis Olimb (31)
- Points: Mathis Olimb (41)
- Penalty minutes: Joel Lundqvist (63)
- Wins: Frederik Andersen (24)
- Goals against average: Frederik Andersen (1.67)

The 2011–12 Frölunda HC season is Frölunda HC's 32nd and current season in the top Swedish league, Elitserien (SEL). The regular season started on September 13, 2011 at home against newly promoted Växjö Lakers and ended on March 6, 2012 at home against Färjestad BK.

== Regular season ==
On November 3, in a home game against Modo, early in the first period Frederik Andersen was run over by Modo's captain Ole-Kristian Tollefsen, who received a minor penalty for charging. Andersen's head struck the crossbar but he continued playing, allowing two goals despite making a spectacular save before the first period ended. During the first intermission, Andersen felt ill and decided to not return to the ice for the rest of the game. Hellberg stepped in and Frölunda managed to overcome their two-goal deficit by scoring four goals in the first nine minutes of the second period. In the third Modo's Nicklas Danielsson elbowed Joel Lundqvist in the face, causing a jaw fracture for Lundqvist. The game eventually ended in a 6–3 win, and Danielsson was reported to the Swedish Ice Hockey Association's Disciplinary Board the following day for checking to the head. Danielsson was suspended for two Elitserien games and one international Karjala Cup game, and was fined 11,000 SEK. In the following game on November 5 against Linköping—the last game before the Karjala Cup break—the injury list was further expanded when Magnus Kahnberg was hit blind-sided in the head by former teammate Sebastian Karlsson. Kahnberg fell unconscious, with his face first to the ice, and laid bleeding for several minutes before he was taken out on a stretcher. The hit resulted in Kahnberg being hospitalised with a severe concussion, a deep forehead laceration, and several teeth knocked out. Karlsson was ejected from the game for checking to the head, and received a match penalty. Karlsson was later suspended for eleven Elitserien games and three 2011 European Trophy playoff games. Frölunda suffered their first loss on home ice as the game ended 1–2, and Frölunda went into the break third in the standings with 37 points, two points short of then league leaders HV71.

Lundqvist returned to action on November 28, in a 1–4 loss against Färjestad. In early December, Pierre Johnsson was forced to undergo surgery for an inguinal hernia, sidelining him for four weeks.

After a great start of the season with a top 4 spot in the league, Frölunda fell back in December with only six points in nine games. As a result, Frölunda fell to the sixth spot in the league at 49 points. In a 2–6 loss on December 28 against AIK, Jari Tolsa was suspended for 2 games and fined 9,000 SEK for running over a linesman after an offside call. He returned on 12 January against Djurgården, a 3–2 overtime win, but after two hits on Jimmie Ölvestad and Daniel Tjärnqvist in that game, leaving both opponents with a concussion, he was re-suspended for 2 games and fined 9,000 SEK for the hit on Tjärnqvist. Kahnberg returned as well in that game, scoring one goal. Johnsson returned to action on January 3 in a 3–2 win against Linköping. Tolsa returned on January 18 in a 4–1 home win against Brynäs.

=== Standings ===
2011–12 Elitserien season	GP	W	L	OTW	OTL	GF	GA	GD	Pts
Luleå HF^{y}	55	25	13	8	9	128	104	+24	100
Skellefteå AIK^{x}	55	26	17	5	7	148	125	+23	95
HV71^{x}	55	22	16	9	8	151	130	+21	92
Brynäs IF^{x}	55	25	19	6	5	148	140	+8	92
Frölunda HC^{x}	55	22	17	8	8	140	113	+27	90
Färjestad BK^{x}	55	23	18	4	10	124	124	0	87
AIK^{x}	55	19	19	8	9	146	132	+14	82
Modo Hockey^{x}	55	19	22	8	6	146	147	–1	79
Växjö Lakers HC^{e}	55	18	22	8	7	124	133	–9	77
Linköpings HC^{e}	55	17	24	7	7	120	138	–18	72
Djurgårdens IF^{r}	55	15	23	10	7	123	144	–21	72
Timrå IK^{r}	55	10	31	8	6	115	183	–68	52

x – clinched playoff spot; y – clinched regular season league title; e – eliminated from playoff contention; r – play in relegation series

=== Games log ===
2011–12 Elitserien games log; 22–17–16 (Home: 15–7–6; Away: 7–10–10)

September: 5–0–1 (Home: 3–0–0; Away: 2–0–1)
Round	Date	Opponent	Score	Goaltender	Venue	Attendance	Record	Pts
6	September 13	Växjö Lakers HC	2–0	Andersen	Scandinavium	12,044	1–0–0	3
1	September 15	Modo Hockey	4–1	Andersen	Fjällräven Center	5,846	2–0–0	6
2	September 17	Luleå HF	2–1	Andersen	Scandinavium	9,210	3–0–0	9
3	September 21	Brynäs IF	2–0	Andersen	Läkerol Arena	5,305	4–0–0	12
4	September 24	AIK IF	0–1 (SO)	Andersen	Hovet	4,815	4–0–1	13
5	September 27	Timrå IK	5–0	Hellberg	Scandinavium	8,775	5–0–1	16

October: 4–4–3 (Home: 4–0–2; Away: 0–4–1)
Round	Date	Opponent	Score	Goaltender	Venue	Attendance	Record	Pts
7	October 1	Skellefteå AIK	2–3	Andersen	Skellefteå Kraft Arena	5,011	5–1–1	16
8	October 4	Färjestad BK	2–3 (OT)	Hellberg	Scandinavium	11,296	5–1–2	17
9	October 6	Linköpings HC	1–2	Andersen	Cloetta Center	5,496	5–2–2	17
10	October 8	Djurgårdens IF	2–0	Andersen	Scandinavium	10,507	6–2–2	20
14	October 11	AIK IF	3–2 (OT)	Andersen	Scandinavium	7,566	6–2–3	22
11	October 13	HV71	3–0	Andersen	Scandinavium	10,181	7–2–3	25
12	October 15	Färjestad BK	1–2	Andersen	Löfbergs Lila Arena	7,566	7–3–3	25
13	October 20	HV71	3–4 (SO)	Andersen	Kinnarps Arena	7,000	7–3–4	26
15	October 24	Luleå HF	3–2	Hellberg	Scandinavium	10,775	8–3–4	29
16	October 27	Brynäs IF	5–1	Hellberg	Scandinavium	11,231	9–3–4	32
17	October 29	Timrå IK	1–3	Andersen	E.ON Arena	4,008	9–4–4	32

November: 2–3–3 (Home: 2–2–1; Away: 0–1–2)
Round	Date	Opponent	Score	Goaltender	Venue	Attendance	Record	Pts
18	November 1	Djurgårdens IF	3–2 (SO)	Andersen	Hovet	7,546	9–4–5	34
19	November 3	Modo Hockey	6–3	Hellberg	Scandinavium	11,688	10–4–5	37
20	November 5	Linköpings HC	1–2	Hellberg	Scandinavium	11,027	10–5–5	37
21	November 15	Växjö Lakers HC	1–3	Andersen	Vida Arena	5,241	10–6–5	37
22	November 18	Skellefteå AIK	3–1	Andersen	Scandinavium	11,255	11–6–5	40
23	November 22	Djurgårdens IF	4–3 (SO)	Hellberg	Scandinavium	10,027	11–6–6	42
24	November 26	Skellefteå AIK	3–4 (SO)	Hellberg	Skellefteå Kraft Arena	5,251	11–6–7	43
25	November 28	Färjestad BK	1–4	Hellberg	Scandinavium	12,044	11–7–7	43

December: 1–5–3 (Home: 0–2–2; Away: 1–3–1)
Round	Date	Opponent	Score	Goaltender	Venue	Attendance	Record	Pts
26	December 1	Modo Hockey	2–3 (OT)	Hellberg	Fjällräven Center	5,372	11–7–8	44
27	December 3	Växjö Lakers HC	2–6	Hellberg	Scandinavium	11,918	11–8–8	44
28	December 6	Linköpings HC	3–0	Hellberg	Cloetta Center	6,027	12–8–8	47
29	December 8	HV71	3–4 (SO)	Hellberg	Scandinavium	11,862	12–8–9	48
30	December 10	Brynäs IF	3–4	Hellberg	Läkerol Arena	8,079	12–9–9	48
31	December 11	Luleå HF	2–3	Hellberg	Scandinavium	8,079	12–10–9	48
32	December 26	Timrå IK	2–1 (SO)	Andersen	Scandinavium	9,250	12–10–10	50
33	December 28	AIK IF	2–6	Andersen	Hovet	6,469	12–11–10	50
34	December 30	HV71	0–4	Andersen	Kinnarps Arena	7,000	12–12–10	50

January: 5–1–4 (Home: 4–0–1; Away: 1–1–3)
Round	Date	Opponent	Score	Goaltender	Venue	Attendance	Record	Pts
35	January 3	Linköpings HC	3–2	Andersen	Scandinavium	8,597	13–12–10	53
36	January 12	Djurgårdens IF	3–2 (OT)	Andersen	Hovet	6,024	13–12–11	55
37	January 14	Luleå HF	1–2 (SO)	Andersen	Coop Norrbotten Arena	4,914	13–12–12	56
38	January 16	AIK IF	1–2 (OT)	Andersen	Scandinavium	8,114	13–12–13	57
39	January 18	Brynäs IF	4–1	Andersen	Scandinavium	11,225	14–12–13	60
40	January 20	Modo Hockey	2–1	Andersen	Scandinavium	10,223	15–12–13	63
41	January 23	Luleå HF	1–2	Andersen	Coop Norrbotten Arena	4,446	15–13–13	63
42	January 26	Växjö Lakers HC	3–2 (OT)	Andersen	Vida Arena	5,329	15–13–14	65
43	January 28	Skellefteå AIK	6–1	Andersen	Scandinavium	10,789	16–13–14	68
44	January 31	Timrå IK	4–0	Andersen	E.ON Arena	4,131	17–13–14	71

February: 4–2–2 (Home: 2–1–0; Away: 2–1–2)
Round	Date	Opponent	Score	Goaltender	Venue	Attendance	Record	Pts
45	February 2	Färjestad BK	3–2 (SO)	Andersen	Löfbergs Lila Arena	6,412	17–13–15	73
46	February 4	Timrå IK	6–0	Andersen	Scandinavium	9,899	18–13–15	76
47	February 14	Djurgårdens IF	2–1	Andersen	Scandinavium	10,062	19–13–15	79
48	February 16	Skellefteå AIK	6–3	Andersen	Skellefteå Kraft Arena	4,877	20–13–15	82
49	February 18	HV71	1–2	Andersen	Scandinavium	12,044	20–14–15	82
50	February 21	AIK IF	1–0 (SO)	Andersen	Hovet	4,714	20–14–16	84
51	February 25	Linköpings HC	5–1	Andersen	Cloetta Center	7,530	21–14–16	87
52	February 27	Modo Hockey	0–3	Hellberg	Fjällräven Center	5,109	21–15–16	87

March: 1–2–0 (Home: 0–2–0; Away: 1–0–0)
Round	Date	Opponent	Score	Goaltender	Venue	Attendance	Record	Pts
53	March 1	Växjö Lakers HC	1–3	Hellberg	Scandinavium	10,053	21–16–16	87
54	March 3	Brynäs IF	3–2	Andersen	Läkerol Arena	7,990	22–16–16	90
55	March 6	Färjestad BK	2–3	Andersen	Scandinavium	11,839	22–17–16	90

Legend: Win Overtime/Shootout win (2 points) Loss (0 points) Overtime/Shootout loss (1 point)

== Playoffs ==
Each playoff series is a best-of-seven, meaning that four wins are required to advance to the next round.

=== Game log ===
2011–12 Playoffs log; 2–4 (Home: 1–2; Away: 1–2)

Quarterfinals vs. (4) Brynäs IF: 2–4 (Home: 1–2; Away: 1–2)
Round	Date	Score	Goaltender	Venue	Attendance	Series
1	March 10	1–3	Andersen	Läkerol Arena	6,224	0–1
2	March 12	2–1	Andersen	Scandinavium	10,264	1–1
3	March 14	3–4 (OT)	Andersen	Läkerol Arena	7,693	1–2
4	March 16	0–5	Andersen	Scandinavium	12,044	1–3
5	March 18	2–1	Andersen	Läkerol Arena	8,283	2–3
6	March 20	3–4 (OT)	Andersen	Scandinavium	10,515	2–4

Legend: Win Loss

== Statistics ==
=== Skaters ===
Name	Pos	Nationality	GP	G	A	P	PIM	GP	G	A	P	PIM
Name	Pos	Nationality	Regular season					Playoffs				
Mathis Olimb	C	Norway	55	10	31	41	34	6	1	3	4	10
Mika Pyörälä	LW	Finland	53	22	18	40	12	6	1	2	3	2
Fredrik Pettersson	RW	Sweden	54	16	24	40	58	6	1	2	3	6
Joel Lundqvist	C	Sweden	48	11	19	30	63	6	0	2	2	4
Christian Bäckman	D	Sweden	55	11	16	27	48	6	0	2	2	2
Patrick von Gunten	D	Switzerland	51	5	19	24	12	6	0	0	0	0
Magnus Kahnberg	RW	Sweden	29	9	11	20	4	6	2	1	3	2
Jari Tolsa	LW	Sweden	42	8	12	20	45	6	1	1	2	4
Fredrik Eriksson	D	Sweden	55	4	16	20	50	6	1	0	1	8
Mikael Johansson	C	Sweden	54	8	9	17	42	5	0	1	1	2
Henrik Tömmernes	D	Sweden	44	5	9	14	36	6	1	3	4	4
Per-Johan Axelsson	LW	Sweden	52	2	12	14	22	4	0	0	0	2
Johan Sundström	C	Sweden	49	6	5	11	8	6	0	0	0	2
Anton Axelsson	LW	Sweden	42	5	6	11	16	6	1	1	2	0
Nicklas Lasu	LW	Sweden	45	4	5	9	39	6	0	1	1	25
Fredrik Sjöström	RW	Sweden	35	5	3	8	28	6	0	0	0	2
Pierre Johnsson	D	Sweden	44	1	7	8	28	5	1	0	1	2
Christoffer Persson	D	Sweden	52	1	5	6	38	6	0	0	0	4
Viktor Svedberg	D	Sweden	55	3	2	5	20	6	0	0	0	0
Robin Lindqvist	C	Sweden	35	0	4	4	8	—	—	—	—	—
Victor Backman	RW	Sweden	8	2	1	3	0	—	—	—	—	—
Mats Rosseli Olsen	LW	Norway	11	1	0	1	0	6	1	0	1	4
Toni Koivisto	LW	Finland	17	1	0	1	6	—	—	—	—	—
Magnus Hellberg	G	Sweden	17	0	1	1	0	—	—	—	—	—
Villiam Haag	RW	Sweden	3	0	0	0	0	—	—	—	—	—
Otto Jaksch	D	Sweden	3	0	0	0	0	—	—	—	—	—
Philip Martinsson	D	Sweden	3	0	0	0	0	—	—	—	—	—
Jonathan Johnson	C	Sweden	9	0	0	0	0	—	—	—	—	—
Kristoffer Wikner	RW	Sweden	13	0	0	0	0	—	—	—	—	—
Patrik Näslund	LW	Sweden	16	0	0	0	0	3	0	0	0	0
Oliver Bohm	D	Sweden	22	0	0	0	2	1	0	0	0	0
Frederik Andersen	G	Denmark	39	0	0	0	2	6	0	0	0	0
Sebastian Collberg	RW	Sweden	41	0	0	0	0	—	—	—	—	—

== Transactions ==
The off-season started with the decision from veterans Niklas Andersson and Andreas Karlsson to retire, and after a season of limited playing time Ville Mäntymaa decided to head back home to Finland. Early on Frölunda extended the contracts of Henrik Tömmernes and Nicklas Lasu, brought up Victor Backman from the junior team, and signed contracts with former Frölunda players Anton Axelsson and Jari Tolsa, and later on another returnee in Magnus Kahnberg. Despite offering to play at half his previous salary, and much to the dismay of the fans, Frölunda icon Tomi Kallio was not offered a new contract and eventually signed with Elitserien's newcomer Växjö Lakers. The goaltending was completely overhauled as goalie coach Michael Lehner, and goaltenders Johan Holmqvist and Joakim Lundström left the team and were replaced by goalie coach Micce Andréasson and his aspirant Magnus Hellberg, as well as Danish national Fredrik Andersen, and a local prospect Linus Fernström. The defence was also overhauled when Tobias Viklund, John Klingberg, and Oscar Hedman left the team, and Pierre Johnsson, Fredrik Eriksson, Christoffer Persson, and Swiss national Patrick von Gunten were brought in. After three seasons with Frölunda, assistant captain Riku Hahl left for Finland, and fellow Finn Mikko Mäenpää headed to the KHL, simultaneously Jesper Mattsson returned to Malmö after having settled the dispute which made him leave them and join Frölunda during the middle of the prior season. Finally junior defenceman Viktor Svedberg was signed to a pro-contract, and Frölunda's top duo from the 2009–10 season—Mathis Olimb and Fredrik Pettersson—returned home after their one-year sojourn in North America.

Acquired
Player	Former team	Date	Notes
Anton Axelsson	Timrå IK	March 23	
Jari Tolsa	Linköpings HC	March 24	
Patrick von Gunten	Kloten Flyers	March 30	
Magnus Hellberg	Almtuna IS	April 4	
Magnus Kahnberg	Brynäs IF	April 4	
Pierre Johnsson	Luleå HF	April 7	
Fredrik Eriksson	Nürnberg Ice Tigers	April 7	
Linus Fernström	Enköpings SK	April 11	
Christoffer Persson	Rögle BK	April 12	
Frederik Andersen	Frederikshavn White Hawks	April 14	
Mathis Olimb	Rockford IceHogs	April 29	
Fredrik Pettersson	Chicago Wolves	July 12	
Fredrik Sjöström	Färjestad BK	November 14	
Mats Rosseli Olsen	Vålerenga Ishockey	January 28	

Leaving
Player	New team	Date	Notes
Niklas Andersson	Retired	March 9	
Andreas Karlsson	Retired	March 11	
Ville Mäntymaa	Oulun Kärpät	March 21	
John Klingberg	Jokerit	April 10	
Tobias Viklund	AIK	April 12	
Johan Holmqvist	Brynäs IF	April 15	
Tomi Kallio	Växjö Lakers	April 18	
Joakim Lundström	Timrå IK	April 20	
Oscar Hedman	Timrå IK	April 27	
Riku Hahl	Jokerit	May 19	
Jesper Mattsson	Malmö Redhawks	May 23	
Mikko Mäenpää	Amur Khabarovsk	May 27	
Dragan Umicevic	Malmö Redhawks	October 10	
Toni Koivisto	Luleå HF	October 31	
Robin Lindqvist	Timrå IK	January 18	

== Drafted players ==
Frölunda HC players picked in the 2012 NHL entry draft at the Consol Energy Center in Pittsburgh, Pennsylvania.

Round	Pick	Player	Nationality	NHL team
2nd	33rd	Sebastian Collberg	Sweden	Montreal Canadiens
3rd	87th	Frederik Andersen	Denmark	Anaheim Ducks
4th	99th	Erik Karlsson	Sweden	Carolina Hurricanes
6th	164th	Simon Fernholm	Sweden	Nashville Predators
