= 2012–13 Frölunda HC season =

Swedish ice hockey club season

2012–13 Frölunda HC
- League: 6th Elitserien
- 2012–13 record: 21–21–13
- Home record: 9–9–9
- Road record: 12–12–4
- Goals for: 123
- Goals against: 126

Team information
- General manager: Kent Johansson
- Coach: Kent Johansson
- Assistant coach: Christian Lechtaler
- Captain: Joel Lundqvist
- Alternate captains: Per-Johan Axelsson; Mikael Johansson
- Arena: Scandinavium and Frölundaborg
- Average attendance: 8,588

Team leaders
- Goals: Joel Lundqvist (12)
- Assists: Joel Lundqvist (22)
- Points: Joel Lundqvist (34)
- Penalty minutes: Dick Axelsson (79)
- Goals against average: Július Hudáček (1.89)

The 2012–13 season will be Frölunda HC's 33rd season in the top Swedish league, the Elitserien (SEL). The regular season will begin on 13 September 2012 with a home game against Linköpings HC, and will conclude on 5 March 2012 on away ice against Växjö Lakers.

== Pre-season ==
=== Summary ===
For the pre-season, Frölunda HC will participate in the 2012 European Trophy tournament, starting on 17 August 2012 and eventually ending mid-season on 22 October 2012 (although playoff participation may follow in December). The regulation round consists of four home games and four road games, for a total of eight games per team.

=== Standings ===
Team is qualified for the playoffs
Team is eliminated from the tournament

Team	GP	W	OTW	OTL	L	GF	GA	+/–	Pts
(Switzerland) EV Zug	8	4	2	0	2	30	21	+9	16
(Finland) Jokerit	7	4	1	1	1	23	14	+9	15
(Sweden) Färjestad BK	7	3	2	1	1	25	16	+9	14
(Germany) ERC Ingolstadt	8	3	1	3	1	34	30	+4	14
(Sweden) Frölunda Indians	8	3	0	2	3	18	32	–14	11
(Finland) HIFK	8	2	0	2	4	24	26	–2	8
(Switzerland) ZSC Lions	8	2	1	0	5	17	24	–7	8
(Germany) Adler Mannheim	8	1	2	0	5	18	26	–8	7

=== Playoff team seeds ===
The following is a list of the current six top-ranked teams aside from the two automatically qualified playoff hosts Slovan Bratislava and Vienna Capitals. The top six teams aside from Slovan Bratislava and Vienna Capitals after all regulation games will also qualify for the playoffs.

1	(Sweden) Luleå HF
2	(Sweden) HV71
3	(Finland) Tappara
4	(Switzerland) EV Zug
5	(Germany) Eisbären Berlin
6	(Germany) ERC Ingolstadt

=== European Trophy games log ===
2012 European Trophy games log; 3–3–2 (Home: 2–2–1; Away: 1–1–1)

August; 2–1–0 (Home: 2–0–0; Away: 1–1–0)
Round	Date	Opponent	Score	Goaltender	Venue	Attendance	Record	Pts
EG	August 14	Växjö Lakers	5–2	Hudáček	Frölundaborg	1,852	—	—
1	August 17	EV Zug	3–2	Galbraith	Frölundaborg	1,472	1–0–0	3
2	August 18	ZSC Lions	2–0	Hudáček	Frölundaborg	1,344	2–0–0	6
3	August 24	ERC Ingolstadt	5–8	Hudáček	Saturn Arena	2,125	2–1–0	6
4	August 26	Adler Mannheim	3–1	Galbraith	SAP Arena	6,435	3–1–0	9
5	August 31	Färjestad BK	2–3 PS	Hudáček	Löfbergs Lila Arena	2,105	3–1–1	10

September; 0–1–1 (Home: 0–0–1; Away: 0–1–0)
Round	Date	Opponent	Score	Goaltender	Venue	Attendance	Record	Pts
6	September 1	Färjestad BK	2–3 PS	Galbraith	Frölundaborg	3,151	3–1–2	11
7	September 7	Jokerit	1–7	Galbraith	Hartwall Areena	3,052	3–2–2	11

October; 0–1–0 (Home: 0–1–0; Away: 0–0–0)
Round	Date	Opponent	Score	Goaltender	Venue	Attendance	Record	Pts
8	October 22	HIFK	0–8	Galbraith	Frölundaborg	818	3–3–2	11

Legend: Win Overtime/Shootout win (2 points) Loss (0 points) Overtime/Shootout loss (1 point)

== Regular season ==
=== Standings ===
2012–13 Elitserien season	GP	W	L	OTW	OTL	GF	GA	GD	Pts
Skellefteå AIK^{y}	55	34	13	4	4	170	107	63	114
Färjestad BK^{x}	55	27	14	7	7	155	110	45	102
Luleå HF^{x}	55	25	12	9	9	145	102	43	102
HV71^{x}	55	27	16	9	3	155	124	31	102
Linköpings HC^{x}	55	27	19	4	5	145	136	9	94
Frölunda HC^{x}	55	21	21	8	5	123	126	–3	84
Modo Hockey^{x}	55	19	19	7	10	135	129	6	81
Brynäs IF^{x}	55	17	20	6	12	123	166	–43	75
AIK^{e}	55	16	25	7	7	123	149	–26	69
Växjö Lakers HC^{e}	55	14	26	7	8	102	130	–28	64
Timrå IK^{r}	55	12	30	8	5	100	127	–27	57
Rögle BK^{r}	55	10	34	5	6	104	174	–70	46

x – clinched playoff spot; y – clinched regular season league title; e – eliminated from playoff contention; r – play in relegation series

=== Games log ===
2012–13 Elitserien games log; 21–21–13 (Home: 9–9–9; Away: 12–12–4)

September: 3–3–2 (Home: 1–2–2; Away: 2–1–0)
Round	Date	Opponent	Score	Decision	Venue	Attendance	Record	Pts
1	September 13	Linköpings HC	1–2	Hudáček	Scandinavium	7,927	0–1–0	0
2	September 15	Växjö Lakers	3–1	Hudáček	Vida Arena	5,645	1–1–0	3
17	September 18	Växjö Lakers	1–2 SO	Hudáček	Scandinavium	6,499	1–1–1	4
3	September 20	Modo Hockey	7–6 OT	Hudáček	Scandinavium	7,118	1–1–2	6
4	September 22	Färjestads BK	3–2	Hudáček	Löfbergs Lila Arena	6,949	2–1–2	9
5	September 25	Skellefteå AIK	2–5	Hudáček	Scandinavium	7,790	2–2–2	9
6	September 27	Luleå HF	1–2	Hudáček	Coop Norrbotten Arena	5,077	2–3–2	9
7	September 29	AIK IF	4–2	Hudáček	Scandinavium	7,835	3–3–2	12

October: 4–6–0 (Home: 1–2–0; Away: 3–4–0)
Round	Date	Opponent	Score	Goaltender	Venue	Attendance	Record	Pts
8	October 2	HV71	1–4	Galbraith	Kinnarps Arena	6,643	3–4–2	12
9	October 4	Rögle BK	0–2	Hudáček	Lindab Arena	3,836	3–5–2	12
10	October 6	Brynäs IF	1–2	Hudáček	Scandinavium	10,740	3–6–2	12
11	October 9	Timrå IK	3–1	Hudáček	E.ON Arena	4,712	4–6–2	15
13	October 13	Modo Hockey	4–3	Hudáček	Fjällräven Center	7,416	5–6–2	18
12	October 15	HV71	2–3	Hudáček	Scandinavium	9,547	5–7–2	18
14	October 18	Linköpings HC	0–4	Galbraith	Cloetta Center	5,414	5–8–2	18
15	October 20	Timrå IK	3–1	Hudáček	Scandinavium	9,455	6–8–2	21
16	October 24	Skellefteå AIK	2–4	Hudáček	Skellefteå Kraft Arena	4,960	6–9–2	21
18	October 28	AIK IF	6–3	Hudáček	Hovet	4,604	7–9–2	24

November: 4–3–2 (Home: 2–1–2; Away: 2–2–0)
Round	Date	Opponent	Score	Goaltender	Venue	Attendance	Record	Pts
19	November 1	Luleå HF	1–2 SO	Hudáček	Scandinavium	9,417	7–9–3	25
20	November 3	Brynäs IF	4–0	Hudáček	Läkerol Arena	8,222	8–9–3	28
21	November 13	Färjestads BK	1–2 OT	Hudáček	Scandinavium	11,142	8–9–4	29
22	November 15	Rögle BK	2–1	Hudáček	Scandinavium	7,272	9–9–4	32
23	November 17	HV71	1–2	Hudáček	Kinnarps Arena	7,000	9–10–4	32
24	November 20	Modo Hockey	0–2	Hudáček	Scandinavium	7,731	9–11–4	32
26	November 24	Färjestads BK	1–4	Hudáček	Löfbergs Lila Arena	8,536	9–12–4	32
27	November 27	Timrå IK	1–0	Hudáček	E.ON Arena	4,208	10–12–4	35
28	November 29	Skellefteå AIK	3–1	Hudáček	Scandinavium	8,808	11–12–4	38

December: 4–2–2 (Home: 4–1–0; Away: 0–1–2)
Round	Date	Opponent	Score	Goaltender	Venue	Attendance	Record	Pts
29	December 1	Brynäs IF	2–0	Hudáček	Scandinavium	11,110	12–12–4	41
30	December 4	Luleå HF	3–2 SO	Hudáček	Coop Norrbotten Arena	4,283	12–12–5	43
31	December 6	Växjö Lakers	0–3	Hudáček	Vida Arena	5,011	12–13–5	43
32	December 8	Linköping HC	3–1	Hudáček	Scandinavium	8,423	13–13–5	46
25	December 18	AIK IF	1–2	Hudáček	Scandinavium	8,209	13–14–5	46
33	December 26	Rögle BK	2–1 SO	Hudáček	Lindab Arena	4,227	13–14–6	48
34	December 28	Växjö Lakers	3–2	Hudáček	Scandinavium	10,027	14–14–6	51
35	December 30	Rögle BK	4–0	Hudáček	Scandinavium	9,098	15–14–6	54

January: 3–3–5 (Home: 0–1–4; Away: 3–2–1)
Round	Date	Opponent	Score	Goaltender	Venue	Attendance	Record	Pts
36	January 5	Skellefteå AIK	0–2	Hudáček	Skellefteå Kraft Arena	5,337	15–15–6	54
37	January 8	Luleå HF	1–3	Hudáček	Scandinavium	7,526	15–16–6	54
38	January 10	AIK IF	3–1	Hudáček	Hovet	4,021	16–16–6	57
39	January 12	HV71	3–4 SO	Hudáček	Scandinavium	11,027	16–16–7	58
40	January 15	Timrå IK	4–3 SO	Hudáček	Scandinavium	7,801	16–16–8	60
41	January 18	Linköping HC	4–3 SO	Fernström	Cloetta Center	6,862	16–16–9	62
48	January 22	Brynäs IF	3–2 SO	Hudáček	Scandinavium	8,955	16–16–10	64
42	January 24	Brynäs IF	5–2	Hudáček	Läkerol Arena	5,180	17–16–10	67
43	January 26	Färjestads BK	1–2 OT	Hudáček	Scandinavium	12,044	17–16–11	68
44	January 29	Modo Hockey	1–6	Fernström	Fjällräven Center	5,125	17–17–11	68
45	January 31	HV71	3–2	Fernström	Kinnarps Arena	6,772	18–17–11	71

February: 3–4–0 (Home: 1–2–0; Away: 2–2–0)
Round	Date	Opponent	Score	Goaltender	Venue	Attendance	Record	Pts
46	February 2	Modo Hockey	1–4	Hudáček	Scandinavium	10,656	18–18–11	71
47	February 12	Färjestads BK	2–3	Hudáček	Löfbergs Lila Arena	7,451	18–19–11	71
49	February 16	Luleå HF	1–6	Hudáček	Coop Norrbotten Arena	5,040	18–20–11	71
50	February 20	Rögle BK	2–1	Galbraith	Lindab Arena	3,319	19–20–11	74
51	February 24	AIK IF	5–3	Hudáček	Frölundaborg	5,027	20–20–11	77
52	February 26	Timrå IK	1–0	Hudáček	E.ON Arena	4,201	21–20–11	80
53	February 28	Linköping HC	2–4	Galbraith	Frölundaborg	5,132	21–21–11	80

March: 0–0–2 (Home: 0–0–1; Away: 0–0–1)
Round	Date	Opponent	Score	Goaltender	Venue	Attendance	Record	Pts
54	March 2	Skellefteå AIK	2–1 OT	Hudáček	Frölundaborg	5,554	21–21–12	82
55	March 5	Växjö Lakers	2–1 SO	Hudáček	Vida Arena	5,137	21–21–13	84

Legend: Win Overtime/Shootout win (2 points) Loss (0 points) Overtime/Shootout loss (1 point)

== Playoffs ==
Each playoff series is a best-of-seven, meaning that four wins are required to advance to the next round.

=== Game log ===
2011–12 Playoffs log; 2–4 (Home: 2–1; Away: 0–3)

Quarterfinals vs. (3) Luleå HF: 2–4 (Home: 2–1; Away: 0–3)
Round	Date	Score	Goaltender	Venue	Attendance	Series
1	March 13	2–5	Hudáček	Coop Norrbotten Arena	5,311	0–1
2	March 15	2–0	Hudáček	Scandinavium	11,027	1–1
3	March 17	1–3	Hudáček	Coop Norrbotten Arena	5,645	1–2
4	March 19	4–3 OT	Hudáček	Scandinavium	11,363	2–2
5	March 21	1–4	Hudáček	Coop Norrbotten Arena	5,405	2–3
6	March 23	2–4	Hudáček	Scandinavium	10,303	2–4

Legend: Win Loss

== Statistics ==
=== Skaters ===
Name	Pos	Nationality	GP	G	A	P	PIM	GP	G	A	P	PIM
Name	Pos	Nationality	Regular season					Playoffs				
Joel Lundqvist	C	Sweden	55	12	22	34	57	6	3	2	5	6
Magnus Kahnberg	RW	Sweden	49	11	15	26	10	6	2	1	3	8
Dick Axelsson	LW	Sweden	45	10	14	24	79	6	0	4	4	2
Christian Bäckman	D	Sweden	54	7	15	22	36	6	1	3	4	0
Fabian Brunnström	LW	Sweden	51	9	9	18	24	6	1	1	2	2
Anton Axelsson	LW	Sweden	53	8	9	17	14	6	0	0	0	2
Per-Johan Axelsson	LW	Sweden	49	6	10	16	10	2	0	0	0	2
Fredrik Eriksson	D	Sweden	55	6	10	16	20	6	1	1	2	10
Henrik Tömmernes	D	Sweden	54	5	11	16	28	6	1	4	5	6
Matt Duchene	C	Canada	19	4	10	14	12	—	—	—	—	—
Mathis Olimb	C	Norway	30	6	7	13	6	6	1	0	1	6
Jari Tolsa	LW	Sweden	52	5	8	13	16	6	1	0	1	0
Viktor Stålberg	LW	Sweden	11	7	5	12	10	—	—	—	—	—
Fredrik Sjöström	RW	Sweden	50	5	5	10	16	1	0	0	0	0
Brendan Bell	D	Canada	21	1	9	10	8	6	1	0	1	6
Sebastian Collberg	RW	Sweden	35	6	3	9	6	5	0	2	2	0
Mats Rosseli Olsen	LW	Norway	54	3	6	9	8	6	0	0	0	6
Christoffer Persson	D	Sweden	52	2	7	9	28	6	0	0	0	2
Nicklas Lasu	LW	Sweden	54	2	7	9	18	6	0	0	0	2
Oliver Bohm	D	Sweden	49	1	8	9	16	6	0	0	0	0
Mikael Johansson	C	Sweden	43	2	3	5	2	6	0	0	0	0
Doug Lynch	D	Canada	33	2	2	4	18	—	—	—	—	—
Pierre Johnsson	D	Sweden	10	1	1	2	10	—	—	—	—	—
Gustav Rydahl	C	Sweden	31	1	1	2	10	5	0	0	0	10
Viktor Svedberg	D	Sweden	51	0	2	2	24	6	0	0	0	4
Andreas Johnson	LW	Sweden	7	1	0	1	0	5	0	0	0	0
Simon Fernholm	D	Sweden	5	0	1	1	0	—	—	—	—	—
Hugo Fagerblom	G	Sweden	1	0	0	0	0	—	—	—	—	—
Villiam Haag	RW	Sweden	1	0	0	0	0	—	—	—	—	—
Tommi Juntunen	D	Sweden	1	0	0	0	0	—	—	—	—	—
Jonathan Johnson	C	Sweden	4	0	0	0	0	—	—	—	—	—
Erik Karlsson	RW	Sweden	5	0	0	0	0	—	—	—	—	—
Mathias Israelsson	G	Sweden	7	0	0	0	0	—	—	—	—	—
Kristoffer Wikner	RW	Sweden	8	0	0	0	0	—	—	—	—	—
Linus Fernström	G	Sweden	21	0	0	0	0	—	—	—	—	—
Patrick Galbraith	G	Denmark	29	0	0	0	0	6	0	0	0	0
Július Hudáček	G	Slovakia	52	0	0	0	2	6	0	0	0	2

== Transactions ==
Goaltending coach Micce Andréasson decided to leave Frölunda after only one season, due to his family's living situation he instead signed a one-year contract with HockeyAllsvenskan team Örebro HK. Andréasson was replaced by Jonas Forsberg, who was brought in after two seasons as the goaltending coach of Kölner Haie of the Deutsche Eishockey Liga (DEL).

Acquired
Player	Former team	Date	Notes
Doug Lynch	EC Red Bull Salzburg	April 13	
Július Hudáček	Södertälje SK	May 11	
Dick Axelsson	Modo Hockey	June 25	
Patrick Galbraith	Espoo Blues	July 13	
Fabian Brunnström	Detroit Red Wings	July 26	
Matt Duchene	Colorado Avalanche	October 2	Lockout
Viktor Stålberg	Chicago Blackhawks	October 11	Lockout
Brendan Bell	New York Rangers	December 13	

Leaving
Player	New team	Date	Notes
Patrick von Gunten	Kloten Flyers	March 9	
Patrik Näslund	Borås HC	May 2	
Mika Pyörälä	Amur Khabarovsk	June 5	
Fredrik Pettersson	HC Donbass	June 8	
Johan Sundström	New York Islanders	June 12	
Magnus Hellberg	Nashville Predators	June 15	
Frederik Andersen	Anaheim Ducks	July 11	
Viktor Stålberg	Atlant Moscow Oblast	Novemberg 17	
Matt Duchene	HC Ambrì-Piotta	December 9	
Doug Lynch	EC Red Bull Salzburg	January 6	

== Drafted players ==
Frölunda HC players picked in the 2013 NHL entry draft on June 30, 2013, at the Prudential Center in Newark, New Jersey.

Round	Pick	Player	Nationality	NHL team
4th	117th	Fredrik Bergvik	Sweden	San Jose Sharks
6th	165th	Markus Søberg	Norway	Columbus Blue Jackets
6th	180th	Anton Blidh	Sweden	Boston Bruins
7th	202nd	Andreas Johnson	Sweden	Toronto Maple Leafs
