= 2013–14 Frölunda HC season =

Swedish ice hockey club season

2013–14 Frölunda HC
- League: 2nd SHL
- 2013–14 record: 29–15–11
- Home record: 13–8–7 (4th)
- Road record: 16–7–4 (2nd)
- Goals for: 153 (5th)
- Goals against: 123 (3rd)

Team information
- General manager: Christian Lechtaler
- Coach: Roger Rönnberg
- Assistant coach: Robert Ohlsson; Klas Östman
- Captain: Joel Lundqvist
- Alternate captains: Christian Bäckman; John Klingberg
- Arena: Scandinavium
- Average attendance: 9,886 (1st)

Team leaders
- Goals: Magnus Kahnberg (18)
- Assists: Mathis Olimb (28)
- Points: Mathis Olimb (39)
- Penalty minutes: Jonas Ahnelöv (61)

The 2013–14 season was Frölunda HC's 34th season Sweden's premier ice hockey league, the Swedish Hockey League (SHL; formerly named Elitserien).

== Pre-season ==
=== European Trophy games log ===
2013 European Trophy games log; 5–2–1 (Home: 3–0–1; Away: 2–2–0)

August; 4–1–1 (Home: 2–0–1; Away: 1–0–0)
Round	Date	Opponent	Score	Goaltender	Venue	Attendance	Record	Pts
EG	August 8	Växjö	3–4 (OT)	Fernström	Vida Arena	3,666	—	—
1	August 13	Jokerit	4–0	Fernström	Frölundaborg	4,542	1–0–0	3
2	August 16	HIFK	5–1	Johansson	Tikkurila Valtti Areena (Vantaa)	1,800	2–0–0	6
3	August 23	ERC Ingolstadt	7–3	Johansson	Frölundaborg	2,798	3–0–0	9
4	August 25	Adler Mannheim	2–3 PS	Fernström	Frölundaborg	2,320	3–0–1	10
5	August 30	EV Zug	7–3	Fernström	Bossard Arena	2,546	4–0–1	13
6	August 31	Zürich Lions	1–3	Johansson	Kunsteisbahn Chreis (Dübendorf)	1,018	4–1–1	13

September; 1–1–0 (Home: 1–0–0; Away: 0–1–0)
Round	Date	Opponent	Score	Goaltender	Venue	Attendance	Record	Pts
7	September 6	Färjestad BK	5–2	Johansson	Scandinavium	7,828	5–1–1	16
8	September 7	Färjestad BK	1–2	Fernström	Löfbergs Lila Arena	3,530	5–2–1	16

Legend: Win Overtime/Shootout win (2 points) Loss (0 points) Overtime/Shootout loss (1 point)

== Regular season ==
=== Standings ===
Updated as of March 8, 2014.

2013–14 SHL season	GP	W	L	OTW	OTL	GF	GA	GD	Pts
Skellefteå AIK^{y}	55	32	12	4	7	179	121	+58	111
Frölunda HC^{x}	55	29	15	4	7	153	123	+30	102
Växjö Lakers^{x}	55	23	14	7	11	156	130	+26	94
Brynäs IF^{x}	55	19	19	11	6	163	152	+11	85
Färjestad BK^{x}	55	21	19	7	8	143	134	+9	85
Luleå HF^{x}	55	22	21	6	6	136	115	+21	84
Leksands IF^{p}	55	23	23	5	4	118	155	–37	83
Modo Hockey^{p}	55	18	20	10	7	131	132	–1	81
Linköpings HC^{p}	55	20	24	7	4	174	167	+7	78
HV71^{p}	55	17	27	9	2	146	182	–36	71
Örebro HK^{r}	55	13	25	5	12	119	160	–41	61
AIK^{r}	55	12	30	6	7	124	171	–47	55

x – clinched playoff spot; y – clinched regular season league title; p – qualified for Play In; r – play in relegation series

=== Games log ===
2013–14 SHL games log; 29–15–11 (Home: 13–8–7; Away: 16–7–4)

September: 3–3–0 (Home: 2–1–0; Away: 1–2–0)
Round	Date	Opponent	Score	Decision	Venue	Attendance	Record	Pts
1	September 14	Skellefteå AIK	2–3	Johansson	Skellefteå Kraft Arena	5,716	0–1–0	0
2	September 17	Luleå HF	2–1	Fernström	Scandinavium	10,027	1–1–0	3
3	September 19	Färjestad BK	1–3	Johansson	Scandinavium	8,112	1–2–0	3
4	September 21	Linköpings HC	3–6	Fernström	Cloetta Center	6,417	1–3–0	3
5	September 24	Modo Hockey	2–1	Johansson	Fjällräven Center	4,626	2–3–0	6
6	September 28	HV71	4–0	Fernström	Scandinavium	9,521	3–3–0	9

October: 4–3–4 (Home: 2–3–2; Away: 2–0–2)
Round	Date	Opponent	Score	Decision	Venue	Attendance	Record	Pts
7	October 1	Brynäs IF	3–4 OT	Johansson	Läkerol Arena	4,112	3–3–1	10
8	October 3	Örebro HK	0–3	Fernström	Scandinavium	7,555	3–4–1	10
9	October 5	Växjö Lakers	3–2 SO	Johansson	Scandinavium	7,552	3–4–2	12
10	October 8	AIK IF	5–3	Fernström	Hovet	3,603	4–4–2	15
11	October 10	Leksands IF	1–2	Johansson	Scandinavium	10,705	4–5–2	15
12	October 12	HV71	4–2	Fernström	Kinnarps Arena	6,714	5–5–2	18
14	October 15	Brynäs IF	3–2	Fernström	Scandinavium	8,165	6–5–2	21
13	October 17	Skellefteå AIK	3–1	Johansson	Scandinavium	7,376	7–5–2	24
15	October 21	Örebro HK	3–2 OT	Fernström	Scandinavium	9,153	7–5–3	26
16	October 26	Färjestad BK	3–2 PS	Johansson	Löfbergs Lila Arena	7,646	7–5–4	28
17	October 30	Modo Hockey	1–2	Fernström	Scandinavium	10,781	7–6–4	28

November: 6–1–3 (Home: 3–1–1; Away: 3–0–2)
Round	Date	Opponent	Score	Decision	Venue	Attendance	Record	Pts
18	November 1	Leksands IF	1–2 SO	Johansson	Ejendals Arena	7,650	7–6–5	29
19	November 3	Linköpings HC	4–3	Fernström	Scandinavium	8,166	8–6–5	32
20	November 12	Luleå HF	3–1	Fernström	Coop Norrbotten Arena	5,017	9–6–5	35
21	November 14	Växjö Lakers	2–1	Johansson	Scandinavium	7,397	10–6–5	38
22	November 16	AIK IF	6–2	Fernström	Hovet	4,818	11–6–5	41
23	November 20	HV71	5–3	Johansson	Scandinavium	10,147	12–6–5	44
24	November 22	Växjö Lakers	2–3 PS	Fernström	Vida Arena	5,419	12–6–6	45
25	November 26	Luleå HF	2–3 OT	Fernström	Scandinavium	9,912	12–6–7	46
26	November 28	Linköpings HC	4–3	Johansson	Cloetta Center	5,746	13–6–7	49
27	November 30	AIK IF	2–3	Fernström	Scandinavium	10,692	13–7–7	49

December: 3–3–2 (Home: 0–1–2; Away: 3–2–0)
Round	Date	Opponent	Score	Decision	Venue	Attendance	Record	Pts
28	December 4	Modo Hockey	3–2	Johansson	Fjällräven Center	5,162	14–7–7	52
30	December 7	Brynäs IF	3–0	Fernström	Läkerol Arena	5,802	15–7–7	55
31	December 10	Örebro HK	3–2 SO	Johansson	Scandinavium	7,986	15–7–8	57
32	December 12	HV71	2–3	Fernström	Kinnarps Arena	6,137	15–8–8	57
33	December 14	Skellefteå AIK	1–4	Fernström	Gamla Ullevi	13,452	15–9–8	57
34	December 26	Skellefteå AIK	6–1	Johansson	Skellefteå Kraft Arena	6,001	16–9–8	60
35	December 28	Brynäs IF	2–3 OT	Fernström	Scandinavium	12,044	16–9–9	61
36	December 30	Luleå HF	1–2	Johansson	Coop Norrbotten Arena	5,358	16–10–9	61

January: 6–2–2 (Home: 3–1–2; Away: 3–1–0)
Round	Date	Opponent	Score	Decision	Venue	Attendance	Record	Pts
29	January 4	Färjestad BK	2–3	Fernström	Scandinavium	11,282	16–11–9	61
37	January 7	Leksands IF	4–0	Johansson	Scandinavium	9,022	17–11–9	64
38	January 9	Färjestad BK	2–1	Fernström	Löfbergs Arena	5,148	18–11–9	67
40	January 14	Linköpings HC	3–4 SO	Johansson	Scandinavium	8,048	18–11–10	68
41	January 17	Örebro HK	3–1	Fernström	Behrn Arena	5,200	19–11–10	71
39	January 21	Modo Hockey	1–2 SO	Johansson	Scandinavium	7,959	19–11–11	72
42	January 23	AIK IF	4–1	Fernström	Scandinavium	7,363	20–11–11	75
43	January 25	Leksands IF	2–3	Fernström	Tegera Arena	7,650	20–12–11	75
44	January 29	HV71	4–1	Fernström	Scandinavium	8772	21–12–11	78
45	January 31	Linköpings HC	5–3	Johansson	Cloetta Center	5,987	22–12–11	81

February: 5–1–0 (Home: 3–0–0; Away: 2–1–0)
Round	Date	Opponent	Score	Decision	Venue	Attendance	Record	Pts
46	February 2	Växjö Lakers	2–1	Fernström	Scandinavium	10,027	23–12–11	84
47	February 4	Luleå HF	4–2	Fernström	Scandinavium	8,350	24–12–11	87
48	February 6	Modo Hockey	2–1	Johansson	Fjällräven Center	5,078	25–12–11	90
49	February 8	Färjestad BK	3–1	Fernström	Scandinavium	12,044	26–12–11	93
50	February 26	Örebro HK	0–6	Fernström	Behrn Arena	4,828	26–13–11	93
51	February 28	Brynäs IF	5–4	Fernström	Läkerol Arena	5,734	27–13–11	96

March: 2–2–0 (Home: 0–1–0; Away: 2–1–0)
Round	Date	Opponent	Score	Decision	Venue	Attendance	Record	Pts
52	March 1	Växjö Lakers	2–4	Johansson	Vida Arena	5,750	27–14–11	96
53	March 3	Skellefteå AIK	6–1	Johansson	Skellefteå Kraft Arena	5,395	28–14–11	99
54	March 6	Leksands IF	0–3	Fernström	Scandinavium	10,532	28–15–11	99
55	March 8	AIK IF	4–1	Johansson	Hovet	4,218	29–15–11	102

Legend: Win Overtime/Shootout win (2 points) Loss (0 points) Overtime/Shootout loss (1 point)

== Playoffs ==
Each playoff series is a best-of-seven, meaning that four wins are required to advance to the next round.

=== Game log ===
2013–14 Playoffs log; 3–4 (Home: 2–2; Away: 1–2)

Quarterfinals vs. (9) Linköpings HC : 3–4 (Home: 2–2; Away: 1–2)
Round	Date	Score	Goaltender	Venue	Attendance	Series
1	March 15	3–2	Fernström	Scandinavium	10,033	1–0
2	March 17	1–2 OT	Johansson	Cloetta Center	6,015	1–1
3	March 19	1–3	Fernström	Scandinavium	9,167	1–2
4	March 21	3–2	Johansson	Cloetta Center	8,500	2–2
5	March 23	6–2	Johansson	Scandinavium	8,875	3–2
6	March 25	3-5	Johansson	Cloetta Center	6,884	3–3
7	March 27	0-2	Johansson	Scandinavium	11,470	3–4

Legend: Win Loss

== Statistics ==
=== Skaters ===
Name	Pos	Nationality	GP	G	A	P	PIM	GP	G	A	P	PIM
Name	Pos	Nationality	Regular season					Playoffs				
Mathis Olimb	C	Norway	52	11	28	39	28	7	1	1	2	2
Dick Axelsson	LW	Sweden	48	10	25	35	56	7	1	2	3	2
Magnus Kahnberg	RW	Sweden	55	18	15	32	22	5	1	0	1	2
John Klingberg	D	Sweden	50	11	17	28	12	7	0	4	4	2
Andreas Johnson	LW	Sweden	44	15	9	24	2	7	1	0	1	4
Robin Figren	RW	Sweden	43	9	14	23	54	7	0	1	1	6
Alexander Wennberg	C	Sweden	50	16	5	21	8	7	1	0	1	0
Erik Gustafsson	D	Sweden	50	2	18	20	16	—	—	—	—	—
Anton Axelsson	LW	Sweden	55	12	6	18	33	7	2	0	2	0
Evan McGrath	C	Canada	47	6	12	18	12	—	—	—	—	—
Nicklas Lasu	LW	Sweden	50	3	13	16	26	7	2	2	4	2
Mats Rosseli Olsen	LW	Norway	48	6	9	15	40	1	0	0	0	0
Joel Lundqvist	C	Sweden	46	3	14	17	59	7	1	2	3	4
Jonas Ahnelöv	D	Sweden	52	5	9	14	61	7	0	2	2	2
Mikael Wikstrand	D	Sweden	19	4	7	11	4	7	1	1	2	0
Sebastian Collberg	RW	Sweden	40	3	6	9	8	1	0	0	0	0
Christian Bäckman	D	Sweden	50	2	5	7	36	7	1	1	2	2
Max Görtz	RW	Sweden	18	6	0	6	2	7	3	2	5	0
Erik Karlsson	RW	Sweden	42	5	1	6	6	6	1	0	1	0
Oliver Bohm	D	Sweden	48	1	5	6	12	7	0	1	1	0
Emil Djuse	D	Sweden	18	0	5	5	6	—	—	—	—	—
Anton Blidh	LW	Sweden	24	0	5	5	2	6	1	2	3	0
Tom Nilsson	D	Sweden	50	2	2	4	22	7	0	0	0	2
Christoffer Persson	D	Sweden	48	1	1	2	32	7	0	1	1	4
Fabian Brunnström	LW	Sweden	4	0	2	2	2	—	—	—	—	—
Jonathan Johnson	C	Sweden	2	1	0	1	0	—	—	—	—	—
Gustav Rydahl	C	Sweden	22	1	0	1	14	—	—	—	—	—
Kevin Elgestål	LW	Sweden	2	0	1	1	0	—	—	—	—	—
Robin Söderqvist	C	Sweden	5	0	1	1	0	2	0	0	0	0
Pontus Widerström	C	Sweden	13	0	2	2	2	7	0	2	2	0
Lars Johansson	G	Sweden	53	0	1	1	0	7	0	0	0	0
Linus Fernström	G	Sweden	54	0	1	1	0	7	0	0	0	0
Markus Søberg	RW	Norway	1	0	0	0	0	—	—	—	—	—
Julius Bergman	D	Sweden	1	0	0	0	4	—	—	—	—	—
Christoffer Ehn	C	Sweden	2	0	0	0	0	—	—	—	—	—
Pierre Johnsson	D	Sweden	2	0	0	0	4	—	—	—	—	—
Fredrik Bergvik	G	Sweden	3	0	0	0	0	—	—	—	—	—

== Transactions ==
Acquired
Player	Former team	Date	Notes
Tom Nilsson	Mora IK	April 3	
Alexander Wennberg	Djurgårdens IF	April 4	
Erik Gustafsson	Djurgårdens IF	April 4	
Robin Figren	Linköping HC	April 12	
Lars Johansson	VIK Västerås HK	April 16	
Emil Djuse	Södertälje SK	April 17	
Evan McGrath	IK Oskarshamn	April 18	
Jonas Ahnelöv	Modo Hockey	May 16	
John Klingberg	Skellefteå AIK	May 20	
Max Görtz	Färjestad BK	December 9	

Leaving
Player	New team	Date	Notes
Jari Tolsa	Graz 99ers	April 3	
Fredrik Eriksson	Nürnberg Ice Tigers	April 3	
Viktor Svedberg	Rockford IceHogs	April 4	
Mikael Johansson	Varberg Vipers	April 5	
Fredrik Sjöström	Retired	April 4	
Per-Johan Axelsson	Retired	April 10	
Július Hudáček	Sibir Novosibirsk	April 15	
Patrick Galbraith	Karlskrona HK	April 16	
Fabian Brunnström	Leksands IF	October 5	
Evan McGrath	VIK Västerås HK	February 26	

== Drafted players ==
Frölunda HC players picked in the 2014 NHL entry draft on June 27–28, 2014 at the Wells Fargo Center in Philadelphia.

Round	Pick	Player	Nationality	NHL team
2nd	46th	Julius Bergman	Sweden	San Jose Sharks
3rd	87th	Anton Karlsson	Sweden	Arizona Coyotes
4th	91st	William Lagesson	Sweden	Edmonton Oilers
4th	106th	Christoffer Ehn	Sweden	Detroit Red Wings
6th	165th	John Nyberg	Sweden	Dallas Stars
7th	182nd	Hugo Fagerblom	Sweden	Florida Panthers
7th	188th	Pierre Engvall	Sweden	Toronto Maple Leafs
7th	194th	Kevin Elgestål	Sweden	Washington Capitals
