= List of Frölunda HC seasons =

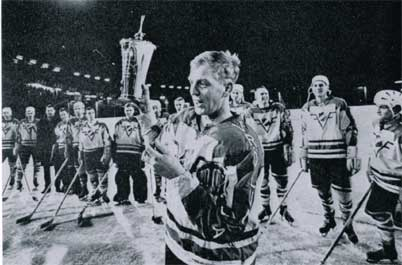
Team captain and playing coach Lars-Eric Lundvall hoisting the Le Mat Trophy at Ullevi when Frölunda won their first Swedish Championship in 1965.

This is a list of seasons completed by the Frölunda ice hockey franchise of the Swedish Hockey League (SHL). The list documents the season-by-season records of the Frölunda franchise from 1944 to present, including post-season records. The Frölunda franchise was founded in 1938 as an ice hockey section in Västra Frölunda IF and played their first game in 1944. They reached the premier division of Swedish ice hockey in 1959, and were charter members of Elitserien when the league was founded in 1975. In 1984 the ice hockey section became an independent franchise known as Västra Frölunda HC, they shortened their name to Frölunda HC in 2004. Between 1995 and 2022 the team marketed them self as the Frölunda Indians.

Frölunda have won the national championship title five times, in 1965, 2003, 2005, 2016 and 2019. They have also been runners-up for the title seven times. In their history, Frölunda have made forty-five post-season appearances while playing in the highest division. They have an overall regular season record in Elitserien and the SHL of 938 wins, 764 losses, and 411 games that have gone to overtime, which ranks second in the all-time standings.

== Seasons ==
Swedish Playoffs Champions	Regular Season Champions	Promoted	Relegated

Season	League	Division	Regular season								Postseason results							
Season	League	Division	Finish	GP	W	L	T	GF	GA	Pts	Finish	GP	W	L	T	GF	GA	Pts
1943–44	No games played																	
1944–45	Season not completed																	
1945–46	Gothenburg	B	3rd	3	1	2	0	4	19	2								
1946–47	Gothenburg	A	2nd	3	1	1	1	21	12	3								
1947–48	Gothenburg		2nd	5	4	1	0	20	8	8								
1948–49	No games played																	
1949–50	Gothenburg	B	1st	3	3	0	0	16	4	6								
1950–51	Gothenburg	1	1st	4	4	0	0	29	9	8								
1951–52	Division 3	South	3rd	5	3	2	0	19	27	6								
1952–53	Division 3	South	5th	8	2	6	0	22	40	4								
1953–54	Gothenburg	1	1st	4	4	0	0	46	8	8								
1954–55	Division 3	South A	2nd	10	6	3	1	38	19	13								
1955–56	Division 3	South A	2nd	10	7	2	1	54	27	15								
1956–57	Division 3	South C	1st	5	5	0	0	41	4	10								
1957–58	Division 2	West B	2nd	14	8	2	4	61	33	20								
1958–59	Division 2	South B	1st	14	11	3	0	73	37	22	1st	6	3	1	2	19	14	8
1959–60	Division 1	South	7th	14	4	10	0	54	104	8								
1960–61	Division 2	West B	1st	14	14	0	0	171	35	28	1st	6	5	1	0	30	17	10
1961–62	Division 1	South	2nd	14	9	4	1	93	39	19	2nd	7	6	0	1	33	21	13
1962–63	Division 1	South	1st	14	12	2	0	96	42	24	5th	7	3	3	1	33	28	7
1963–64	Division 1	South	1st	14	11	2	1	91	41	23	4th	7	4	3	0	29	25	8
1964–65	Division 1	South	1st	14	11	2	1	78	39	23	1st	14	12	2	0	72	39	24
1965–66	Division 1	South	2nd	21	14	6	1	132	72	29	Won in Quarterfinals, 2–0 (Modo); Won in Semifinals, 2–1 (Djurgården); Lost in Finals, 1–2 (Brynäs)							
1966–67	Division 1	South	3rd	21	13	4	4	119	64	30	Won in Quarterfinals, 2–0 (Mora); Won in Semifinals, 2–1 (Södertälje); Lost in Finals, 0–2 (Brynäs)							
1967–68	Division 1	South	4th	21	10	7	4	91	58	24	3rd	7	3	3	1	22	23	7
1968–69	Division 1	South	2nd	21	16	5	0	124	63	32	3rd	7	4	2	1	34	20	9
1969–70	Division 1	South	4th	14	8	5	1	57	46	17	2nd	14	8	4	2	62	39	18
1970–71	Division 1	South	4th	14	9	4	1	71	48	19	8th	14	3	10	1	38	65	7
1971–72	Division 1	South	1st	14	11	3	0	77	34	22	6th	14	5	9	0	55	50	10
1972–73	Division 1	South	4th	14	5	6	3	49	47	13	3rd	14	6	3	5	53	45	17
1973–74	Division 1	South	2nd	14	9	4	1	66	36	19	7th	21	6	11	4	72	80	16
1974–75	Division 1		7th	30	16	11	3	134	118	35								
1975–76	Elitserien		7th	36	14	18	4	154	153	32								
1976–77	Elitserien		8th	36	12	19	5	150	174	29								
1977–78	Elitserien		6th	36	17	10	9	158	122	43								
1978–79	Elitserien		5th	36	18	14	4	157	129	40								
1979–80	Elitserien		3rd	36	19	14	3	153	137	41	Won in Semifinals, 2–1 (Björklöven); Lost in Finals, 2–3 (Brynäs)							
1980–81	Elitserien		4th	36	18	14	4	149	149	40	Lost in Quarterfinals, 0–2 (AIK)							
1981–82	Elitserien		7th	36	14	15	7	132	123	35								
1982–83	Elitserien		7th	36	12	18	6	135	160	30								
1983–84	Elitserien		10th	36	8	20	8	129	195	24								
1984–85	Division 1	South	1st	18	16	2	0	132	51	32								
1984–85	Allsvenskan		3rd	14	7	5	2	72	63	16	Won in Play off 2, 2–1 (Mora); Lost in Play off 3, 1–2 (Västerås)							
1985–86	Division 1	South	1st	18	15	2	1	107	50	31								
1985–86	Allsvenskan		4th	14	5	4	5	58	48	15	Lost in Play off 2, 1–2 (Västerås)							
1986–87	Division 1	South	1st	18	16	1	1	113	45	33								
1986–87	Allsvenskan		3rd	14	10	4	0	73	40	20	Lost in Play off 1, 0–2 (Väsby)							
1987–88	Division 1	South	1st	18	15	2	1	130	48	31								
1987–88	Allsvenskan		1st	18	14	4	0	106	69	28	Lost in finals, 2–3 (Skellefteå)							
1987–88	Kvalserien		3rd	6	2	4	0	28	30	4								
1988–89	Division 1	South	1st	18	15	2	1	127	48	31								
1988–89	Allsvenskan		2nd	18	13	4	1	97	56	27	Lost in finals, 2–3 (Västerås)							
1988–89	Kvalserien		1st	6	5	1	0	40	20	10								
1989–90	Elitserien		10th	40	13	25	2	154	202	28								
1990–91	Elitserien		12th	22	3	13	6	59	97	12								
1990–91	Allsvenskan		1st	18	13	3	2	82	51	28	Lost in finals, 1–3 (Leksand)							
1990–91	Kvalserien		1st	6	5	1	0	32	18	10								
1991–92	Elitserien		5th	40	17	12	11	149	139	45	Lost in Quarterfinals, 2–3 (Brynäs)							
1992–93	Elitserien		11th	22	8	12	2	67	74	18								
1992–93	Allsvenskan		1st	18	14	2	2	91	40	30	Won in finals, 3–0 (Huddinge)							
1993–94	Elitserien		4th	40	18	14	8	122	117	44	Lost in Quarterfinals, 1–3 (Djurgården)							
1994–95	Elitserien		11th	22	6	11	5	63	70	17								
1994–95	Allsvenskan		2nd	18	12	4	2	106	50	26	Won in finals, 3–2 (Rögle)							
1995–96	Elitserien		2nd	40	20	10	10	130	95	50	Won in Quarterfinals, 3–2 (Leksand); Won in Semifinals, 3–1 (Modo); Lost in Finals, 1–3 (Luleå)							
1996–97	Elitserien		7th	50	17	16	17	134	133	51	Lost in Quarterfinals, 0–3 (Luleå)							
1997–98	Elitserien		4th	46	17	14	15	136	107	49	Won in Quarterfinals, 3–0 (Brynäs); Lost in Semifinals, 1–3 (Färjestad)							
1998–99	Elitserien		7th	50	19	23	8	148	136	70	Lost in Quarterfinals, 1–3 (Modo)							
1999–00	Elitserien		3rd	50	25	15	10	155	131	89	Lost in Quarterfinals, 1–4 (Modo)							
2000–01	Elitserien		8th	50	21	22	7	155	139	72	Lost in Quarterfinals, 1–4 (Färjestad)							
2001–02	Elitserien		5th	50	23	19	8	181	150	81	Won in Quarterfinals, 4–1 (Djurgården); Lost in Semifinals, 1–4 (Modo)							
2002–03	Elitserien		1st	50	29	11	10	162	97	103	Won in Quarterfinals, 4–2 (Modo); Won in Semifinals, 4–2 (Timrå); Won Swedish Championship, 4–0 (Färjestad)							
2003–04	Elitserien		3rd	50	24	16	10	160	116	89	Won in Quarterfinals, 4–0 (Djurgården); Lost in Semifinals, 2–4 (HV71)							
2004–05	Elitserien		1st	50	33	8	9	180	96	112	Won in Quarterfinals, 4–0 (Luleå); Won in Semifinals, 4–1 (Djurgården); Won Swedish Championship, 4–1 (Färjestad)							
2005–06	Elitserien		2nd	50	28	14	8	169	130	96	Won in Quarterfinals, 4–0 (Brynäs); Won in Semifinals, 4–3 (Linköping); Lost in Finals, 2–4 (Färjestad)							
2006–07	Elitserien		9th	55	22	24	9	167	162	76								
2007–08	Elitserien		6th	55	23	22	10	159	157	82	Lost in Quarterfinals, 3–4 (Färjestad)							
2008–09	Elitserien		3rd	55	25	29	10	144	130	91	Won in Quarterfinals, 4–1 (Luleå); Lost in Semifinals, 2–4 (HV71)							
2009–10	Elitserien		7th	55	22	22	11	155	156	78	Lost in Quarterfinals, 3–4 (Linköping)							
2010–11	Elitserien		9th	55	19	24	12	128	158	74								
2011–12	Elitserien		5th	55	22	17	16	140	113	90	Lost in Quarterfinals, 2–4 (Brynäs)							
2012–13	Elitserien		6th	55	21	21	12	123	126	84	Lost in Quarterfinals, 2–4 (Luleå)							
2013–14	SHL		2nd	55	29	15	11	153	123	102	Lost in Quarterfinals, 3–4 (Linköping)							
2014–15	SHL		2nd	55	23	15	17	145	120	97	Won in Quarterfinals, 4–3 (Luleå); Lost in Semifinals, 2–4 (Växjö)							
2015–16	SHL		2nd	52	30	15	7	169	112	104	Won in Quarterfinals, 4–1 (Djurgården); Won in Semifinals, 4–2 (Luleå); Won Swedish Championship, 4–1 (Skellefteå)							
2016–17	SHL		3rd	52	27	15	10	142	114	97	Won in Quarterfinals, 4–3 (Skellefteå); Lost in Semifinals, 3–4 (Brynäs)							
2017–18	SHL		3rd	52	25	15	12	159	137	94	Lost in Quarterfinals, 2–4 (Malmö)							
2018–19	SHL		3rd	52	24	16	12	152	134	92	Won in Quarterfinals, 4–1 (Malmö); Won in Semifinals, 4–1 (Luleå); Won Swedish Championship, 4–1 (Djurgården)							
2019–20	SHL		7th	52	29	21	2	154	126	85	Playoffs cancelled due to COVID-19 pandemic							
2020–21	SHL		7th	52	28	23	1	133	131	84	Won in Eighth-finals, 2–1 (Djurgården); Lost in Quarterfinals, 0–4 (Rögle)							
2021–22	SHL		4th	52	31	17	4	155	139	87	Won in Quarterfinals, 4–0 (Växjö); Lost in Semifinals, 1–4 (Luleå)							
2022–23	SHL		6th	52	21	18	13	140	139	81	Won in Quarterfinals, 4–3 (Färjestad); Lost in Semifinals, 2–4 (Växjö)							
2023–24	SHL		4th	52	24	14	14	144	119	96	Won in Quarterfinals, 4–3 (Leksand); Lost in Semifinals, 3–4 (Skellefteå)							
2024–25	SHL		3rd	52	25	18	9	139	116	91	Won in Quarterfinals, 4–2 (Timrå); Lost in Semifinals, 2–4 (Luleå)							
2025–26	SHL		2nd	52	30	15	7	161	106	101	Lost in Quarterfinals, 2–4 (Luleå)							
Elitserien/SHL totals			2nd	2113	938	764	411	6603	5986	3126	(1975–2026, includes regular season only)							
