= 2015 Hockey City Classic =

Sports tournament

The 2015 Hockey City Classic was a doubleheader of two outdoor ice hockey games played on February 7, 2015 at Soldier Field in Chicago, Illinois. This was the third edition of the Hockey City Classic. The first game was played between Miami (OH) and Western Michigan and the second game was played between in-state rivals, Michigan and Michigan State.

== Game 1: Miami (OH) vs. Western Michigan ==
2015 Hockey City Classic Game 1
	1	2	3	Total
Miami (OH)	1	3	0	4
Western Michigan	0	0	3	3
- Date: February 7, 2015
- Venue: Soldier Field
- City: Chicago, Illinois
- Attendance: 22,751

The first game of the 2015 Hockey City Classic was played between the Miami RedHawks and the Western Michigan Broncos.

Scoring summary
Period	Team	Goal	Assist(s)	Time	Score
1st	MIAMI	Alex Wideman (6)	Alex Gacek (5), Chris Joyaux (2)	13:28	1–0 MIAMI
2nd	MIAMI	Riley Barber (12) - pp	Louie Belpedio (7), Austin Czarnik (25)	9:26	2–0 MIAMI
2nd	MIAMI	Kevin Morris (4) - pp	Louie Belpedio (8), Blake Coleman (12)	17:50	3–0 MIAMI
2nd	MIAMI	Sean Kuraly (13)	Alex Wideman (6)	18:30	4–0 MIAMI
3rd	WMU	Josh Pitt (1)	Aidan Muir (7), Mike McKee (1)	8:02	4–1 MIAMI
3rd	WMU	Aidan Muir (5)	Willem Nong-Lambert (4), Kyle Novak (2)	8:30	4–2 MIAMI
3rd	WMU	Sheldon Dries (10)	Kenney Morrison (9)	19:15	4–3 MIAMI

Number in parentheses represents the player's total in goals or assists to that point of the season

Penalty summary
Period	Team	Player	Penalty	Time	PIM
1st	MIAMI	Blake Coleman	Interference	17:41	2:00
2nd	WMU	Colton Hargrove	Roughing	3:35	2:00
2nd	MIAMI	Ben Paulides	Roughing	3:35	2:00
2nd	WMU	Matt Stewart	Slashing	3:35	2:00
2nd	WMU	Josh Pitt	Charging	9:24	2:00
2nd	WMU	Will Kessel	Boarding	14:32	2:00
2nd	WMU	Frederik Tiffels	Goaltender Interference	17:09	2:00
2nd	WMU	Neal Goff	Roughing	18:43	2:00
2nd	MIAMI	Anthony Louis	Slashing	20:00	2:00
3rd	WMU	Colton Hargrove	Interference	5:04	2:00
3rd	WMU	Nolan LaPorte	10-Minute Misconduct	20:00	10:00

== Game 2: Michigan State vs. Michigan ==
2015 Hockey City Classic Game 2
	1	2	3	Total
Michigan State	0	0	1	1
Michigan	1	2	1	4
- Date: February 7, 2015
- Venue: Soldier Field
- City: Chicago, Illinois
- Attendance: 22,751

The second game of the Hockey City Classic was played between the Michigan State Spartans and the Michigan Wolverines. This was Michigan's seventh outdoor Hockey Game since the Cold War as well as their fourth against Michigan State. Michigan was 2–3–1 in outdoor hockey games entering the Hockey City Classic, including 1–1–1 in outdoor games against Michigan State.

Scoring summary
Period	Team	Goal	Assist(s)	Time	Score
1st	MICH	Michael Downing (5)	Tony Calderone (6), Cristoval Nieves (14)	1:43	1–0 MICH
2nd	MICH	Cutler Martin (4)	Justin Selman (7), Cristoval Nieves (15)	13:16	2–0 MICH
2nd	MICH	Andrew Copp (13)	Michael Downing (13), Tyler Motte (17)	17:47	3–0 MICH
3rd	MSU	Matt DeBlouw (6)	Mack MacEachern (9), Matt Berry (9)	5:51	3–1 MICH
3rd	MICH	Justin Selman (6) - en	Zach Hyman (21)	18:48	4–1 MICH

Number in parentheses represents the player's total in goals or assists to that point of the season

Penalty summary
Period	Team	Player	Penalty	Time	PIM
1st	MSU	Ron Boyd	Interference	12:35	2:00
1st	MSU	Brent Darnell	Hooking	15:39	2:00
1st	MICH	Cristoval Nieves	Holding	15:39	2:00
2nd	MICH	Andrew Copp	Checking	5:07	2:00
2nd	MSU	Villiam Haag	Slashing	7:30	2:00
2nd	MICH	Justin Selman	Interference	8:37	2:00
2nd	MICH	Cutler Martin	Hooking	15:35	2:00
2nd	MSU	Matt Berry	Goaltender Interference	19:24	2:00
