= Söderqvist =

Söderqvist is a surname. Notable people with the surname include:

- Jan Söderqvist, author, see Netocracy
- Louise Söderqvist, Swedish journalist and publicist
- Nils-Erik Söderqvist (born 1948), Swedish politician
- Robin Söderqvist (born 1994), Swedish ice hockey player
