= Otto Jaksch =

Swedish ice hockey player

- Born: May 17, 1992 (age 33) Öckerö, Sweden
- Height: 6 ft 3 in (191 cm)
- Weight: 207 lb (94 kg; 14 st 11 lb)
- Position: Defence
- Shoots: Right
- Played for: Frölunda HC; Diables Rouges de Briançon
- NHL draft: Undrafted
- Playing career: 2011–present

Otto Jaksch (born May 17, 1992, in Öckerö) is a Swedish ice hockey defenceman. He is currently playing with Frölunda HC in the Elitserien.

== Career statistics ==
			Regular season					Playoffs
Season	Team	League	GP	G	A	Pts	PIM	GP	G	A	Pts	PIM
2007–08	Sunne IK J18	J18 Elit	18	1	1	2	10	—	—	—	—	—
2008–09	Frölunda HC J18	J18 Elit	18	0	3	3	8	—	—	—	—	—
2008–09	Frölunda HC J18	J18 Allsvenskan	14	1	0	1	6	5	0	0	0	4
2009–10	Frölunda HC J18	J18 Elit	19	1	8	9	26	—	—	—	—	—
2009–10	Frölunda HC J18	J18 Allsvenskan	18	0	9	9	22	8	2	0	2	16
2009–10	Frölunda HC J20	J20 SuperElit	—	—	—	—	—	2	0	0	0	0
2010–11	Frölunda HC J20	J20 SuperElit	41	4	10	14	46	7	1	2	3	6
2011–12	Frölunda HC J20	J20 SuperElit	41	6	14	20	69	2	0	0	0	0
2011–12	Frölunda HC	Elitserien	3	0	0	0	0	—	—	—	—	—
2011–12	Borås HC	HockeyAllsvenskan	11	0	1	1	6	—	—	—	—	—
2012–13	Borås HC	Hockeyettan	5	0	0	0	0	—	—	—	—	—
2012–13	Piteå HC	Hockeyettan	19	2	4	6	22	17	0	1	1	40
2013–14	HC Vita Hästen J20	J20 Div.1	1	2	0	2	4	—	—	—	—	—
2013–14	HC Vita Hästen	Hockeyettan	21	2	9	11	30	12	0	1	1	10
2014–15	Varberg HK	Hockeyettan	30	1	3	4	40	—	—	—	—	—
2015–16	Diables Rouges de Briançon	Ligue Magnus	7	0	1	1	6	—	—	—	—	—
2017–18	Filipstads IF	Division 2	19	8	8	16	18	2	0	2	2	4
Elitserien totals			3	0	0	0	0	—	—	—	—	—
Ligue Magnus totals			7	0	1	1	6	—	—	—	—	—
HockeyAllsvenskan totals			11	0	1	1	6	—	—	—	—	—
Hockeyettan totals			75	5	16	21	92	29	0	2	2	50
