= Fredrik Bergvik =

Swedish ice hockey player (born 1995)

- Born: 14 February 1995 (age 31) Stockholm, Sweden
- Height: 6 ft 2 in (188 cm)
- Weight: 185 lb (84 kg; 13 st 3 lb)
- Position: Goaltender
- Catches: Left
- Allsv team Former teams: Södertälje SK; Frölunda HC
- NHL draft: 117th overall, 2013; San Jose Sharks
- Playing career: 2014–present

Fredrik Bergvik (born 14 February 1995) is a Swedish professional ice hockey goaltender. He is currently playing with Södertälje SK team in the Swedish HockeyAllsvenskan (Allsv). He was drafted by the San Jose Sharks in the fourth round (117th overall) of the 2013 NHL entry draft.

Bergvik made his SHL debut with Frölunda HC on 26 February 2014, in a game against Örebro HK, in relief of Linus Fernström.

== Career statistics ==
			Regular season									Playoffs
Season	Team	League	GP	W	L	T/OT	Min	GA	SO	GAA	SV%	GP	W	L	Min	GA	SO	GAA	SV%
2012–13	Frölunda HC	J20	14	—	—	—	834:11	18	4	1.29	.949	—	—	—	—	—	—	—	—
