= Kristoffer Wikner =

Swedish ice hockey player (born 1993)

- Born: January 20, 1993 (age 32) Kungsbacka, Sweden
- Height: 6 ft 1 in (185 cm)
- Weight: 170 lb (77 kg; 12 st 2 lb)
- Position: Forward
- Shot: Right
- Played for: Frölunda HC
- NHL draft: Undrafted
- Playing career: 2011–2018

Kristoffer Wikner Sundborg (born January 20, 1993) is a Swedish retired ice hockey winger. He made his Elitserien debut with Frölunda HC during the 2011–12 season and played a total of 21 games during the 2011–12 and 2012–13 seasons. The majority of his professional career was spent with teams in the HockeyAllsvenskan and Hockeyettan. After struggling with recovery from a concussion for several years, Wikner retired in 2018.
