= Patrik Näslund =

Swedish professional ice hockey winger (born 1992)

- Born: April 10, 1992 (age 33) Värnamo, Sweden
- Height: 6 ft 3 in (191 cm)
- Weight: 220 lb (100 kg; 15 st 10 lb)
- Position: Winger
- Shoots: Left
- Allsv team: Asplöven HC
- NHL draft: Undrafted
- Playing career: 2008–present

Patrik Näslund (born April 10, 1992) is a Swedish professional ice hockey winger, currently playing for Asplöven HC in the HockeyAllsvenskan.

== Playing career ==
Näslund signed a contract with Borås HC of HockeyAllsvenskan for the 2012–13 season. In July Borås HC were forced to relegate to Division 1 due to economic reasons, Näslund then signed a contract with Asplöven HC who were promoted and took Borås' spot in HockeyAllsvenskan.

== Career statistics ==
=== Regular season and playoffs ===
			Regular season					Playoffs
Season	Team	League	GP	G	A	Pts	PIM	GP	G	A	Pts	PIM
2008–09	Växjö Lakers	Allsv	6	1	1	2	0	2	0	0	0	0
2009–10	Växjö Lakers	Allsv	29	0	0	0	2	6	0	0	0	0
2010–11	Växjö Lakers	Allsv	21	2	1	3	2	—	—	—	—	—
2010–11	Frölunda HC	J20	20	5	10	15	12	7	2	1	3	6
2011–12	Frölunda HC	J20	41	13	12	25	49	2	0	0	0	0
2011–12	Frölunda HC	SEL	16	0	0	0	0	3	0	0	0	0
SEL totals			16	0	0	0	0	3	0	0	0	0
