= Robin Söderqvist =

Swedish ice hockey player

- Born: September 27, 1994 (age 30); Gothenburg, Sweden
- Height: 181 cm (5 ft 11 in)
- Weight: 84 kg (185 lb; 13 st 3 lb)
- Position: Forward
- Shoots: Left
- SHL team Former teams: IK Oskarshamn; Frölunda HC; Växjö Lakers
- Playing career: 2013–present

Robin Söderqvist (born September 27, 1994) is a Swedish ice hockey player. He is currently playing with IK Oskarshamn of the Swedish Hockey League (SHL).

Söderqvist made his Swedish Hockey League debut playing with Frölunda HC during the 2013–14 season.
