= Patrick von Gunten =

Swiss ice hockey player

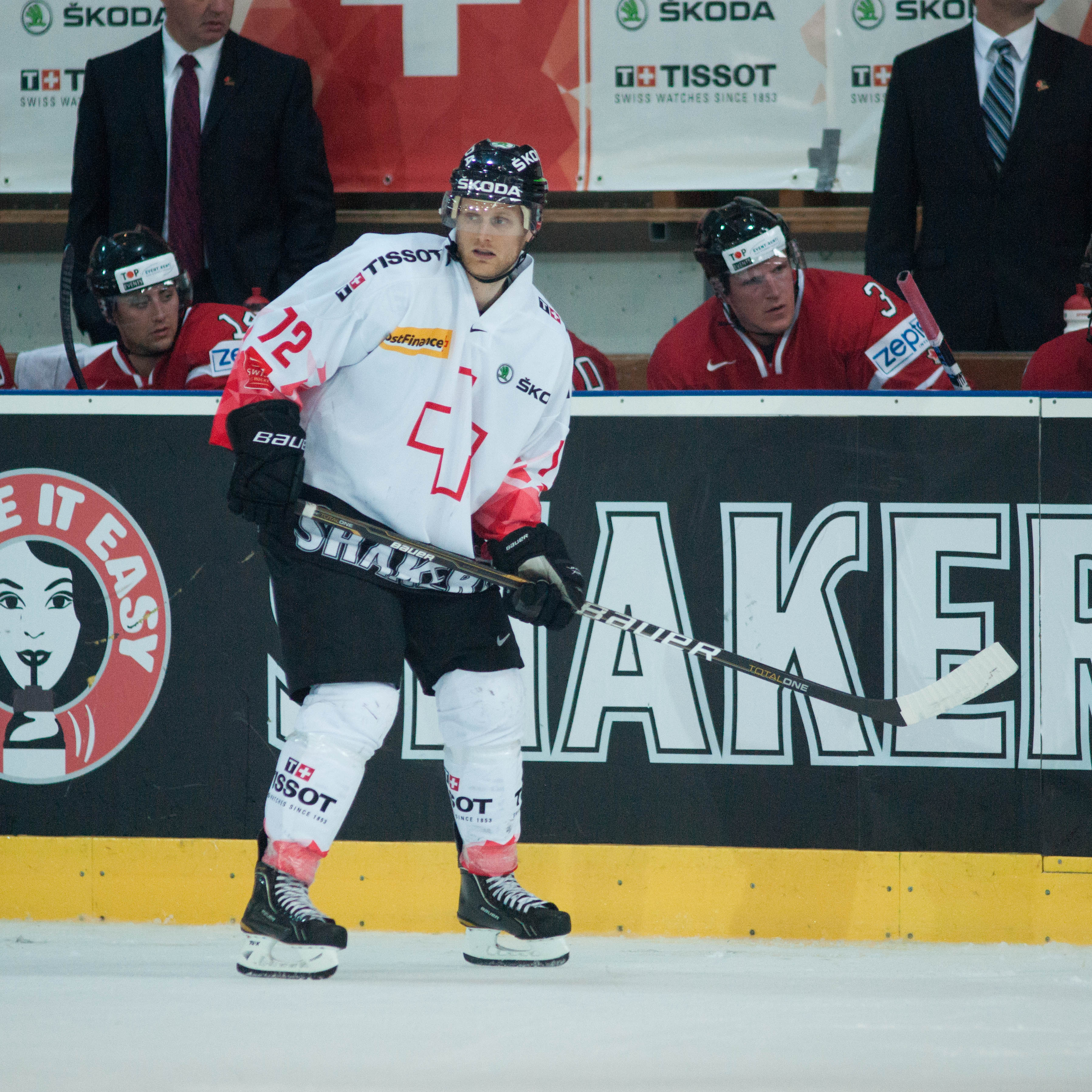
- Born: February 10, 1985 (age 40); Biel, Switzerland
- Height: 5 ft 11 in (180 cm)
- Weight: 187 lb (85 kg; 13 st 5 lb)
- Position: Defence
- Shot: Left
- Played for: EHC Biel; EHC Kloten; Frölunda HC
- National team: Switzerland
- Playing career: 2002–2018

Patrick von Gunten (born February 10, 1985) is a Swiss former professional ice hockey defenceman, who played in the Swiss National League A (NLA) with EHC Kloten.

== Playing career ==
Von Gunten first played professionally with hometown club, EHC Biel of the National League B, for four seasons before transferring to the Kloten Flyers in the 2005–06 season. In the 2011–12 season, von Gunten played a single year abroad in the Swedish Elitserien with Frölunda HC.

Despite establishing himself within the Frölunda blueline, von Gunten opted to return to the Kloten Flyers the following season on February 24, 2012. After initially agreeing to a two-year deal, von Gunten contract was voided and was re-signed to an improved four-year deal on June 29, 2012.

On 29 January 2018, von Gunten announced his immediate retirement after 12 seasons with EHC Kloten due to chronic hip and back injuries.

== Career statistics ==
=== Regular season and playoffs ===
			Regular season					Playoffs
Season	Team	League	GP	G	A	Pts	PIM	GP	G	A	Pts	PIM
2000–01	EHC Biel	SUI.2 U20	28	1	4	5		7	0	3	3
2001–02	EHC Biel	SUI U20	35	5	4	9	32	2	0	1	1	0
2002–03	EHC Biel	SUI U20	28	4	5	9	66	—	—	—	—	—
2002–03	EHC Biel	NLB	30	1	0	1	27	10	0	0	0	4
2003–04	EHC Biel	SUI U20	9	4	4	8	18	—	—	—	—	—
2003–04	EHC Biel	NLB	42	0	2	2	14	19	2	2	4	24
2004–05	EHC Biel	SUI U20	10	4	9	13	8	—	—	—	—	—
2004–05	EHC Biel	NLB	35	4	7	11	18	12	2	3	5	4
2005–06	EHC Biel	NLB	42	14	9	23	76	21	0	7	7	28
2005–06	Kloten Flyers	NLA	6	2	0	2	2	—	—	—	—	—
2006–07	Kloten Flyers	NLA	44	6	17	23	26	11	3	3	6	18
2007–08	Kloten Flyers	NLA	50	7	9	16	50	5	0	0	0	10
2008–09	Kloten Flyers	NLA	46	12	15	27	90	15	5	4	9	6
2009–10	Kloten Flyers	NLA	50	11	24	35	30	10	0	1	1	12
2010–11	Kloten Flyers	NLA	49	6	22	28	34	18	2	10	12	6
2011–12	Frölunda HC	SEL	51	5	19	24	12	6	0	0	0	0
2012–13	Kloten Flyers	NLA	35	5	10	15	24	—	—	—	—	—
2013–14	Kloten Flyers	NLA	46	3	12	15	32	14	1	1	2	10
2014–15	Kloten Flyers	NLA	46	3	9	12	20	—	—	—	—	—
2015–16	Kloten Flyers	NLA	37	2	15	17	39	4	0	0	0	6
2016–17	EHC Kloten	NLA	15	3	5	8	18	—	—	—	—	—
2017–18	EHC Kloten	NL	34	3	11	14	16	—	—	—	—	—
NL totals			458	63	149	212	381	77	11	19	30	68

Medal record

Ice hockey

Representing Switzerland

World Championships
Silver medal – second place	2013 Sweden/Finland	

=== International ===
Year	Team	Event	Result	GP	G	A	Pts	PIM
2003	Switzerland	WJC18	9th	6	0	1	1	6
2005	Switzerland	WJC	8th	6	0	1	1	2
2010	Switzerland	OG	8th	5	1	0	1	0
2012	Switzerland	WC	11th	7	0	0	0	0
2013	Switzerland	WC	2nd place, silver medalist(s)	10	1	1	2	0
2014	Switzerland	OG	9th	1	0	0	0	0
Junior totals				12	0	2	2	8
Senior totals				23	2	1	3	0
