= Jari Tolsa =

Swedish ice hockey player (born 1981)

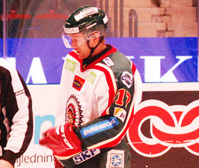
- Born: April 20, 1981 (age 43); Gothenburg, Sweden
- Height: 6 ft 1 in (185 cm)
- Weight: 187 lb (85 kg; 13 st 5 lb)
- Position: Left wing
- Shoots: Left
- team Former teams: Varberg Vipers; Espoo Blues; MODO Hockey; Linköpings HC
- National team: Sweden
- NHL draft: 120th overall, 1999; Detroit Red Wings
- Playing career: 1998–present

Jari Juha Tolsa (born April 20, 1981) is a Swedish professional ice hockey left winger who plays for Varberg Vipers in the Swedish Division 2.

== Personal life ==
Born in Gothenburg, Sweden, Tolsa is of Finnish descent, and he also has Finnish citizenship. Finnish footballer Arto Tolsa was his paternal uncle.

== Career statistics ==
=== Regular season and playoffs ===
			Regular season					Playoffs
Season	Team	League	GP	G	A	Pts	PIM	GP	G	A	Pts	PIM
1998–99	Frölunda HC	J20	36	16	21	37	51	—	—	—	—	—
1999–00	Frölunda HC	J20	33	13	47	60	70	6	3	8	11	6
1999–00	Frölunda HC	SEL	10	0	0	0	0	—	—	—	—	—
2000–01	IF Mölndal Hockey	Swe-2	1	0	2	2	0	—	—	—	—	—
2000–01	Frölunda HC	J20	7	4	3	7	6	5	2	7	9	6
2000–01	Frölunda HC	SEL	42	2	5	7	18	5	0	0	0	0
2001–02	Frölunda HC	SEL	48	8	16	24	18	10	0	0	0	4
2002–03	Frölunda HC	SEL	43	9	14	23	24	16	4	1	5	8
2003–04	Frölunda HC	SEL	50	8	20	28	36	10	2	4	6	4
2004–05	Frölunda HC	SEL	50	4	13	17	32	14	1	6	7	14
2005–06	Frölunda HC	SEL	29	3	6	9	18	17	1	1	2	22
2006–07	Espoo Blues	FEL	42	3	14	17	50	9	3	5	8	6
2007–08	MODO Hockey	SEL	52	5	6	11	87	5	0	0	0	2
2008–09	Espoo Blues	FEL	30	1	5	6	22	13	2	4	6	35
2009–10	Linköpings HC	SEL	54	7	10	17	56	9	0	2	2	2
2010–11	Linköpings HC	SEL	48	3	6	9	28	7	1	0	1	4
2011–12	Frölunda HC	SEL	42	8	12	20	45	6	1	1	2	4
SEL totals			468	57	108	165	362	99	10	15	25	64
