= Saab Arena =

Arena in Linköping, Sweden

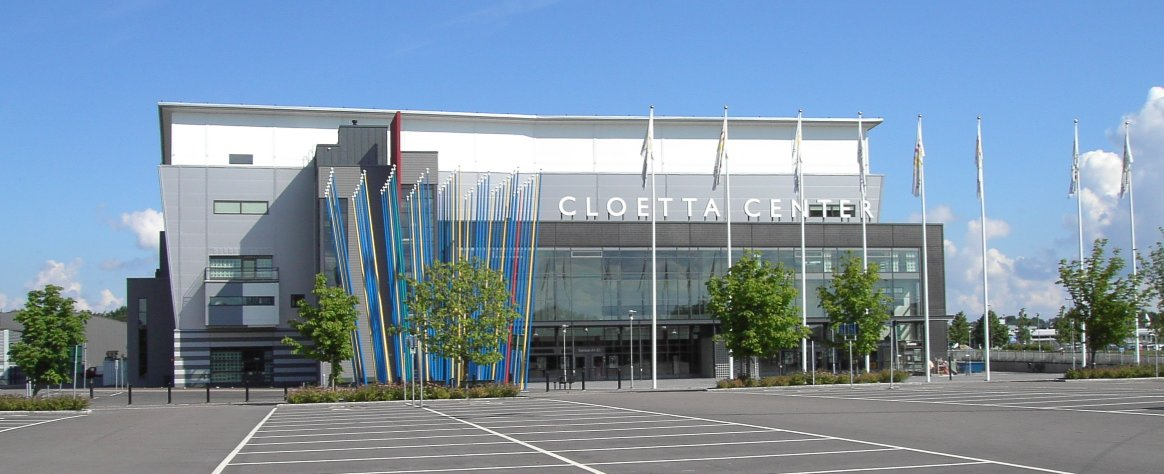
- Interactive map of Saab Arena
- Former names: Cloetta Center (2004–2014)
- Location: Linköping, Sweden
- Coordinates: 58°25′03″N 15°38′06″E
- Owner: Linköpings Sportfastigheter AB
- Capacity: Ice hockey: 8,500; Concerts: 11,500

Construction
- Opened: September 2004
- Architects: Bergfjord & Ivarsson

Tenant
- Linköpings HC

Saab Arena, formerly named Cloetta Center between 2004 and 2014, is an arena in Linköping, Sweden. It opened in September 2004 and holds 8,500 people during sport events and 11,500 during concerts. On its opening, it became the new home ice for the ice hockey team Linköpings HC, replacing Stångebro Ishall.

The arena has hosted a Melodifestivalen heat six times: in 2005, 2008, 2011, 2017, 2020, 2023 and 2026. Some other notable music acts include Ghost, Deep Purple, Europe, John Fogerty, Toto, W.A.S.P. and Whitesnake.

== History ==
The arena cost a total of SEK 249 million to build. Candy manufacturer Cloetta acquired the naming rights prior to the arena's opening and named it Cloetta Center. The name held a double meaning in that "Center" was also one of the company's main brands. On 10 July 2013, Cloetta announced that they wouldn't extend their contracts with the arena after the 2013–14 season, which meant the arena would operate under a new name starting in the 2014–15 season. On 16 June 2014, Saab and Linköpings HC signed an agreement that would rename Cloetta Center to Saab Arena. The change didn't technically take effect before 1 July 2014.

== See also ==
- List of indoor arenas in Sweden
- List of indoor arenas in Nordic countries
