= Fredrik Eriksson (ice hockey, born 1983) =

Swedish ice hockey player

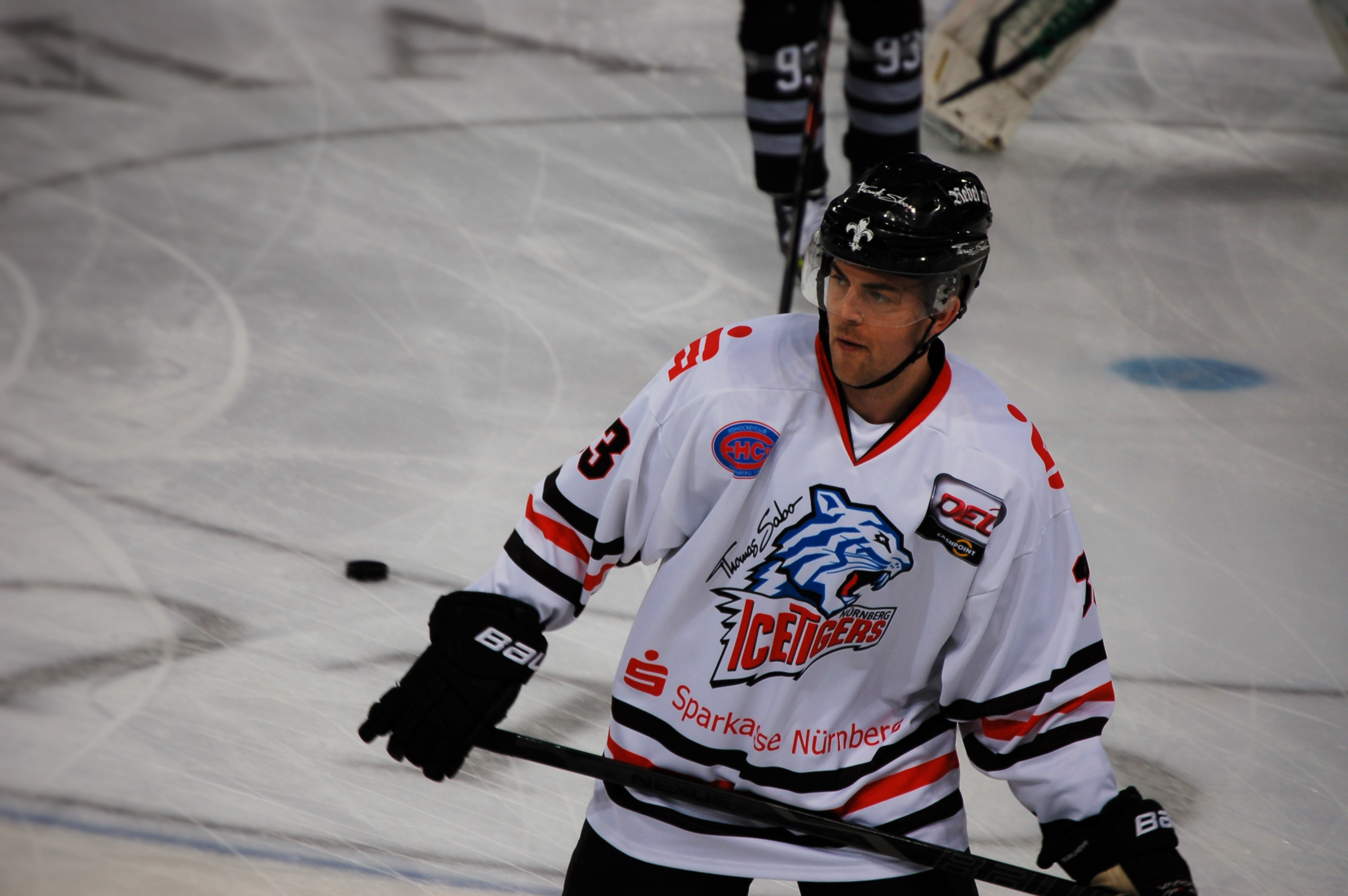
- Born: July 18, 1983 (age 43) Örebro, Sweden
- Height: 6 ft 0 in (183 cm)
- Weight: 192 lb (87 kg; 13 st 10 lb)
- Position: Defence
- Shoots: Left
- Div.1 team Former teams: Borås HC; Färjestads BK; Malmö Redhawks; Frölunda HC; Thomas Sabo Ice Tigers; Kölner Haie; Straubing Tigers; EC KAC
- NHL draft: Undrafted
- Playing career: 2001–present

Fredrik Eriksson (born July 18, 1983) is a Swedish professional ice hockey defenceman, who is currently playing for Borås HC in the HockeyEttan (Div.1).

== Playing career ==
Initially a left winger, Eriksson was signed by Färjestads BK as a junior and played with the club's junior teams until 2001, also playing a few games with Färjestads' senior team. He was subsequently loaned to the Allsvenskan club, Bofors IK. He stayed with Bofors for three seasons and then returned to Färjestad in the summer of 2003.

On April 18, 2006, Färjestad won the Swedish Championship. In April 2006, he left Färjestad and signed with the Malmö Redhawks. It was with Malmö that Eriksson changed to a defensive position.

On April 27, 2010, he left Sweden to sign for German club Thomas Sabo Ice Tigers of the DEL. After one season with the Ice Tigers, Eriksson returned to Sweden to link up with Frölunda HC on a two-year deal.

On April 27, 2013, Eriksson signed for a second stint with the Thomas Sabo Ice Tigers in Germany. In the 2013–14 season, Eriksson assumed a top-pairing role within the Ice Tigers and responded to produce his best season in Germany with 12 goals and 46 points in 49 games. He would lead all DEL defenceman in each scoring category, to be selected as the DEL defenceman of the Year.

After two seasons with the Ice Tigers, Eriksson opted to join his second German side, Kölner Haie, signing as a free agent to a two-year contract on March 23, 2015. On July 9, 2018, Eriksson joined his third German club, the Straubing Tigers, after agreeing to a one-year contract as a free agent.

== Career statistics ==
=== Regular season and playoffs ===
| | | | Regular season | | | | | Playoffs |
| Season | Team | League | GP | G | A | Pts | PIM | GP | G | A | Pts | PIM |
|---|---|---|---|---|---|---|---|---|---|---|---|---|
| 2000–01 | Färjestad BK | SEL | 2 | 0 | 0 | 0 | 0 | 11 | 0 | 0 | 0 | 2 |
| 2001–02 | Bofors IK | Allsv | 46 | 11 | 11 | 22 | 36 | 10 | 3 | 4 | 7 | 4 |
| 2002–03 | Bofors IK | Allsv | 38 | 12 | 14 | 26 | 42 | 2 | 0 | 0 | 0 | 0 |
| 2003–04 | Bofors IK | Allsv | 12 | 5 | 6 | 11 | 6 | 2 | 1 | 1 | 2 | 4 |
| 2003–04 | Färjestad BK | SEL | 35 | 3 | 5 | 8 | 29 | — | — | — | — | — |
| 2004–05 | Färjestad BK | SEL | 40 | 4 | 0 | 4 | 22 | — | — | — | — | — |
| 2004–05 | Bofors IK | Allsv | 8 | 3 | 7 | 10 | 16 | 5 | 2 | 3 | 5 | 6 |
| 2005–06 | Färjestad BK | SEL | 46 | 4 | 8 | 12 | 52 | 18 | 4 | 1 | 5 | 18 |
| 2006–07 | Bofors IK | Allsv | 16 | 8 | 8 | 16 | 26 | — | — | — | — | — |
| 2006–07 | Malmö Redhawks | SEL | 25 | 2 | 12 | 14 | 10 | — | — | — | — | — |
| 2007–08 | Malmö Redhawks | Allsv | 44 | 22 | 34 | 56 | 22 | 10 | 3 | 4 | 7 | 4 |
| 2008–09 | Malmö Redhawks | Allsv | 43 | 11 | 17 | 28 | 78 | — | — | — | — | — |
| 2009–10 | Malmö Redhawks | Allsv | 52 | 5 | 38 | 43 | 42 | 5 | 0 | 2 | 2 | 2 |
| 2010–11 | Thomas Sabo Ice Tigers | DEL | 48 | 4 | 21 | 25 | 61 | 2 | 1 | 0 | 1 | 4 |
| 2011–12 | Frölunda HC | SEL | 55 | 4 | 16 | 20 | 50 | 6 | 1 | 0 | 1 | 8 |
| 2012–13 | Frölunda HC | SEL | 55 | 6 | 10 | 16 | 20 | 6 | 1 | 1 | 2 | 10 |
| 2013–14 | Thomas Sabo Ice Tigers | DEL | 49 | 12 | 34 | 46 | 75 | 6 | 3 | 2 | 5 | 4 |
| 2014–15 | Thomas Sabo Ice Tigers | DEL | 49 | 6 | 29 | 35 | 48 | 1 | 0 | 0 | 0 | 0 |
| 2015–16 | Kölner Haie | DEL | 43 | 10 | 19 | 29 | 36 | 15 | 2 | 6 | 8 | 8 |
| 2016–17 | Kölner Haie | DEL | 52 | 3 | 24 | 27 | 30 | 7 | 0 | 3 | 3 | 6 |
| 2017–18 | Kölner Haie | DEL | 49 | 8 | 19 | 27 | 28 | 2 | 0 | 1 | 1 | 0 |
| 2018–19 | Straubing Tigers | DEL | 47 | 5 | 24 | 29 | 18 | 2 | 0 | 1 | 1 | 0 |
| 2019–20 | Straubing Tigers | DEL | 51 | 10 | 22 | 32 | 40 | — | — | — | — | — |
| 2020–21 | EC KAC | ICEHL | 6 | 1 | 1 | 2 | 4 | — | — | — | — | — |
| 2021–22 | Borås HC | Div.2 | 38 | 11 | 28 | 39 | 20 | 12 | 1 | 8 | 9 | 4 |
| SHL totals | | | 258 | 23 | 51 | 74 | 183 | 44 | 7 | 2 | 9 | 38 |
| DEL totals | | | 388 | 58 | 192 | 250 | 336 | 35 | 6 | 13 | 19 | 22 |

=== International ===
| Year | Team | Event | Result | GP | G | A | Pts | PIM |
|---|---|---|---|---|---|---|---|---|
| 2001 | Sweden | U18 | 7th | 6 | 4 | 2 | 6 | 2 |
| 2003 | Sweden | WJC | 8th | 6 | 0 | 4 | 4 | 10 |
| Junior totals | | | | 12 | 4 | 6 | 10 | 12 |

== Inline career ==
Medal record

Men's Inline Hockey

World Championships
| Gold medal – first place | 2008 - Bratislava | |

Eriksson was a member of the Sweden national men's inline hockey team that competed at the 2008 Men's World Inline Hockey Championships in Bratislava.
