= P. J. Axelsson =

Swedish ice hockey player (born 1975)

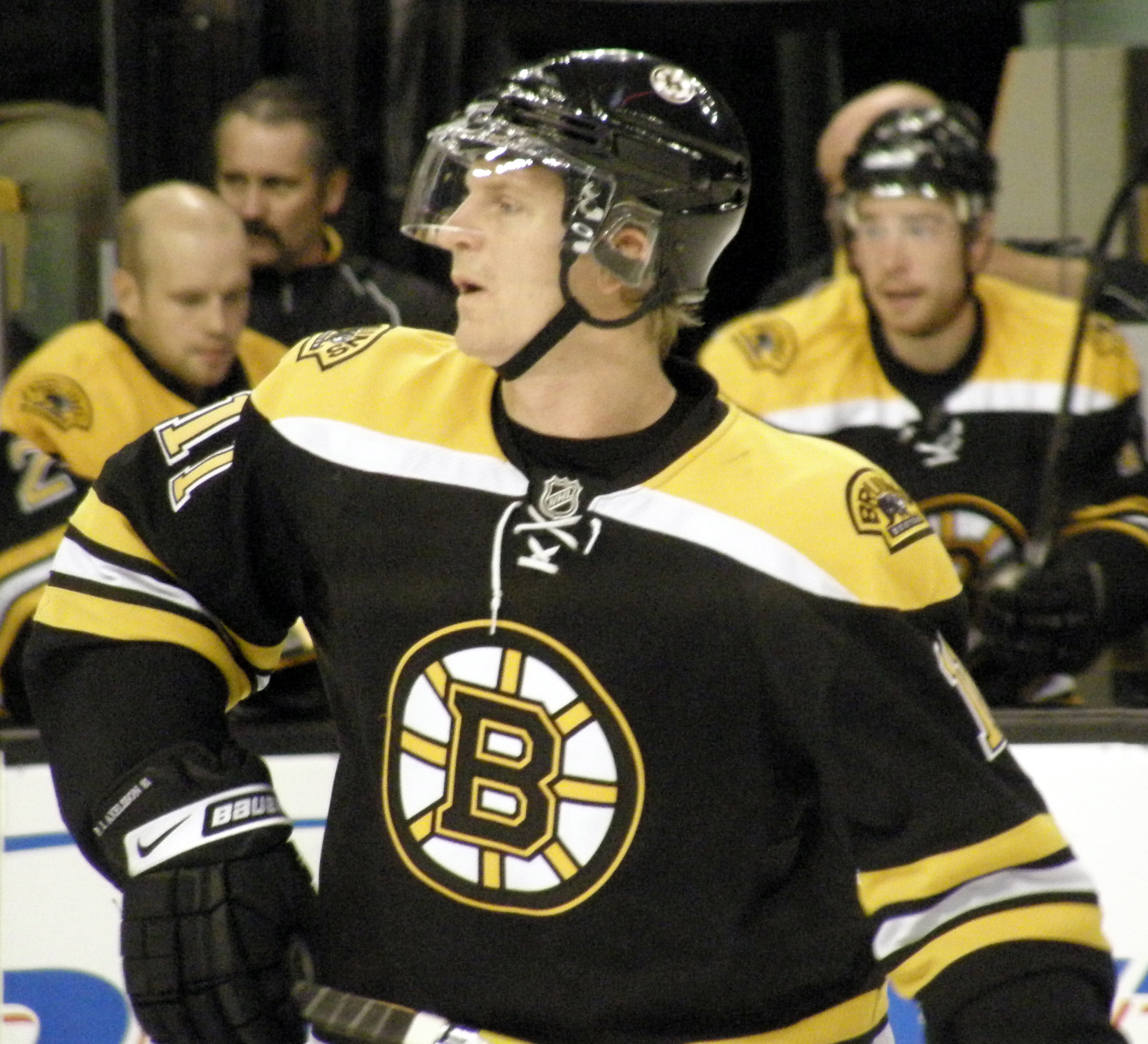
- Born: 26 February 1975 (age 51) Kungälv, Sweden
- Height: 6 ft 1 in (185 cm)
- Weight: 183 lb (83 kg; 13 st 1 lb)
- Position: Left wing
- Shot: Left
- Played for: Västra Frölunda HC; Boston Bruins
- National team: Sweden
- NHL draft: 177th overall, 1995; Boston Bruins
- Playing career: 1993–2013

Medal record

Representing Sweden

Winter Olympics
Gold medal – first place	2006 Turin	

World Championships
Silver medal – second place	2003 Helsinki	
Silver medal – second place	2004 Prague	
Bronze medal – third place	2001 Cologne/Nuremberg	
Bronze medal – third place	2002 Gothenburg	

World Junior Championships
Bronze medal – third place	1995 Red Deer	

Anders Per-Johan Axelsson (born 26 February 1975), commonly abbreviated to P. J. Axelsson, is a Swedish former professional ice hockey forward, who most recently played with Frölunda HC of the Swedish Elitserien. His nickname in Sweden is "Pebben". He was the longest-tenured member of the NHL's Boston Bruins at the time of his departure from North American play in 2009, having been with the Boston team from 1997–2009. Axelsson represented Sweden internationally in multiple competitions and helped them with a gold medal at the 2006 Winter Olympics.

Axelsson played as a left winger. Although he never gained the reputation of a premier goal scorer, Axelsson's gritty, unrelenting attitude as a solid, defensive-minded forward, and his ability to make smart plays on the ice made him a longtime fan favourite of the Boston Bruins, Frölunda HC, and the Swedish national team, Tre Kronor.

== Playing career ==
Axelsson played four seasons for his hometown team, Frölunda HC, in the Swedish Elitserien before being drafted 177th overall in the 1995 NHL entry draft by the Boston Bruins.

Axelsson played all 82 games in his rookie season with the Bruins, scoring 27 points 8 goals 19 assists, helping them to reach the playoffs after the Bruins had missed out the previous season. He was one of the Bruins' key skill players during his career with them. During his first two seasons with the Bruins he was a part of the hero line along with Tim Taylor and Rob DiMaio, the line were known for their defensive and timely scoring. However Taylor was gone from the team the following year during the 1999–2000 Season. During that season Axelsson played in 81 games and scored 10 goals for the first time along with 16 assists. During the following year in 2000-200 Axelsson was paired with the newly acquired Brian Rolston and the two became a dominant force on the Bruins penalty kill, along with contributing shot handed goals. Hockey writer Scott Wood stated “PJ absolutely picked apart opposing teams in the neutral zone and frustrated breakouts and powerplay setups with a kind of sixth sense that I’d never seen from an NHL forward and likely never will again. He would dart in and out of passing lanes, deceiving opponents’ transition games, making life hell for the attack.” Axelsson continued to be a top player and helped the Bruins make the playoffs three straight years from 2001-2004. During this period he also had his best statistical season in 2002-2003, where he scored 36 points in 66 games scoring 17 goals and 19 assists.

During the 2004–05 NHL lockout, Axelsson played for Frölunda HC in Sweden and helped the team win the Le Mat Trophy, scoring 11 points in 14 playoff appearances. After the lockout, he returned to the United States to rejoin the Bruins. On his 31st birthday, he became an Olympic champion with Sweden at the 2006 Winter Olympics.

On 23 March 2006, he signed a three-year extension to his contract with the Boston Bruins. During his first season back the Bruins in 2005-2006 Axelsson scored 28 points in 59 games. He continued to miss games due to injuries the following year only making 55 appearances however he still scored 27 points. In 2007-2008 he played in 75 games scoring 29 points. On 21 February 2008, Axelsson played his 700th NHL game in Sunrise, Florida, a 5–4 shootout win over the Florida Panthers. The 2008-2009 season marked Axelsson’s last with the Bruins he once again appeared in 75 games scoring 30 points 6 goals and a career best 24 assists.

After helping the Bruins to the Eastern Conference semifinals during the 2008–09 NHL season, Axelsson signed a four-year contract with Frölunda HC on 27 July 2009. Upon his return, he was named as one of two alternate captains for the team. Axelsson continued to be a solid player during his final 4 years, and then following the 2012-2013 goals, On 10 April 2013, he announced his retirement from professional hockey. Throughout his career he was known for his unwavering effort level, grit and ability to make great plays on defensive and offensive.

=== Post-retirement ===
Following his retirement Axelsson was subsequently hired by the Bruins as a European amateur scout. He was partly responsible for the drafting by the Bruins of Swedish junior ice hockey defenseman Axel Andersson in the second round of the 2018 NHL entry draft as player #57 overall. Axelsson held the position of amateur scout till 2020, then by the time of the 2021 NHL off-season, Axelsson was promoted to the Bruins' European scouting co-ordinator, helping his former NHL team select Swedish junior forward Fabian Lysell as the Bruins' top pick in the 2021 NHL entry draft.

On 14 January 2014 Axelsson drop the ceremonial first puck at a Bruins home game vs the Toronto Maple Leafs.

== Personal life ==
Axelsson is married and has two children, a daughter named Wilma and a son named Wilson. He and his family live in Sweden, during his spare time, he enjoys golf and football. His younger brother Anton Axelsson is also a professional ice hockey player.

== Career achievements ==
- Bronze medal at the Ice Hockey World Championships in 2001 and 2002.
- Silver medal at the Ice Hockey World Championships in 2003 and 2004.
- Elitserien champion with Frölunda HC in 2005.
- Gold medal at the Winter Olympics in 2006.
- Eddie Shore Award winner in 2006.
- Named one of the top 100 best Bruins players of all time.

== Records ==
- Elitserien record for most assists in a single playoffs (10)

== Career statistics ==
=== Regular season and playoffs ===
			Regular season					Playoffs
Season	Team	League	GP	G	A	Pts	PIM	GP	G	A	Pts	PIM
1992–93	Västra Frölunda HC	SWE U20	16	9	5	14	12	—	—	—	—	—
1992–93	Västra Frölunda HC	Allsv	1	0	0	0	0	—	—	—	—	—
1993–94	Västra Frölunda HC	SEL	11	0	0	0	4	4	0	0	0	0
1994–95	Västra Frölunda HC	J20	19	16	9	25	22	—	—	—	—	—
1994–95	Västra Frölunda HC	SEL	8	2	1	3	6	—	—	—	—	—
1994–95	Västra Frölunda HC	Allsv	3	0	0	0	0	5	0	0	0	0
1995–96	Västra Frölunda HC	SEL	36	15	5	20	10	13	3	0	3	10
1996–97	Västra Frölunda HC	SEL	50	19	15	34	34	3	0	2	2	0
1997–98	Boston Bruins	NHL	82	8	19	27	38	6	1	0	1	0
1998–99	Boston Bruins	NHL	77	7	10	17	18	12	1	1	2	4
1999–2000	Boston Bruins	NHL	81	10	16	26	24	—	—	—	—	—
2000–01	Boston Bruins	NHL	81	8	15	23	27	—	—	—	—	—
2001–02	Boston Bruins	NHL	78	7	17	24	16	6	2	1	3	6
2002–03	Boston Bruins	NHL	66	17	19	36	24	5	0	0	0	6
2003–04	Boston Bruins	NHL	78	7	17	24	16	6	2	1	3	6
2004–05	Frölunda HC	SEL	45	9	9	18	95	14	1	10	11	18
2005–06	Boston Bruins	NHL	59	10	18	28	4	—	—	—	—	—
2006–07	Boston Bruins	NHL	55	11	16	27	52	—	—	—	—	—
2007–08	Boston Bruins	NHL	75	13	16	29	15	7	0	0	0	2
2008–09	Boston Bruins	NHL	75	6	24	30	16	11	0	1	1	2
2009–10	Frölunda HC	SEL	47	10	16	26	51	5	1	0	1	6
2010–11	Frölunda HC	SEL	50	4	10	14	41	—	—	—	—	—
2011–12	Frölunda HC	SEL	52	2	12	14	22	4	0	0	0	2
2012–13	Frölunda HC	SEL	49	6	10	16	10	2	0	0	0	2
SEL totals			348	67	78	145	273	45	5	12	17	38
NHL totals			797	103	184	287	276	54	4	3	7	24

=== International ===
Year	Team	Event	GP	G	A	Pts	PIM
1995	Sweden	WJC	7	2	3	5	2
2000	Sweden	WC	6	1	3	4	2
2001	Sweden	WC	9	3	6	9	12
2002	Sweden	OG	4	0	0	0	2
2002	Sweden	WC	5	3	3	6	4
2003	Sweden	WC	9	4	3	7	16
2004	Sweden	WC	7	2	3	5	8
2004	Sweden	WCH	4	0	0	0	2
2005	Sweden	WC	7	1	0	1	2
2006	Sweden	OG	8	3	3	6	0
Senior totals			59	17	21	38	48

== See also ==
- List of NHL players who spent their entire career with one franchise
