= Villiam Haag =

Swedish ice hockey player

- Born: 25 November 1993 (age 31); Gothenburg, Sweden
- Height: 6 ft 1 in (185 cm)
- Weight: 198 lb (90 kg; 14 st 2 lb)
- Position: Forward
- Shoots: Right
- Allsvenskan team Former teams: Almtuna IS; Frölunda HC
- NHL draft: Undrafted
- Playing career: 2012–present

Villiam Haag (born 25 November 1993) is a Swedish ice hockey player currently playing for Almtuna IS of the HockeyAllsvenskan.

He played 11 games for the Muskegon Lumberjacks (USHL) during the 2012–13 season and also appeared for Michigan State University between 2013 and 2017. Haag made his Elitserien debut playing with Frölunda HC during the 2011–12 Elitserien season.
