= Monitor ERP Arena =

Indoor arena in Gävle, Sweden

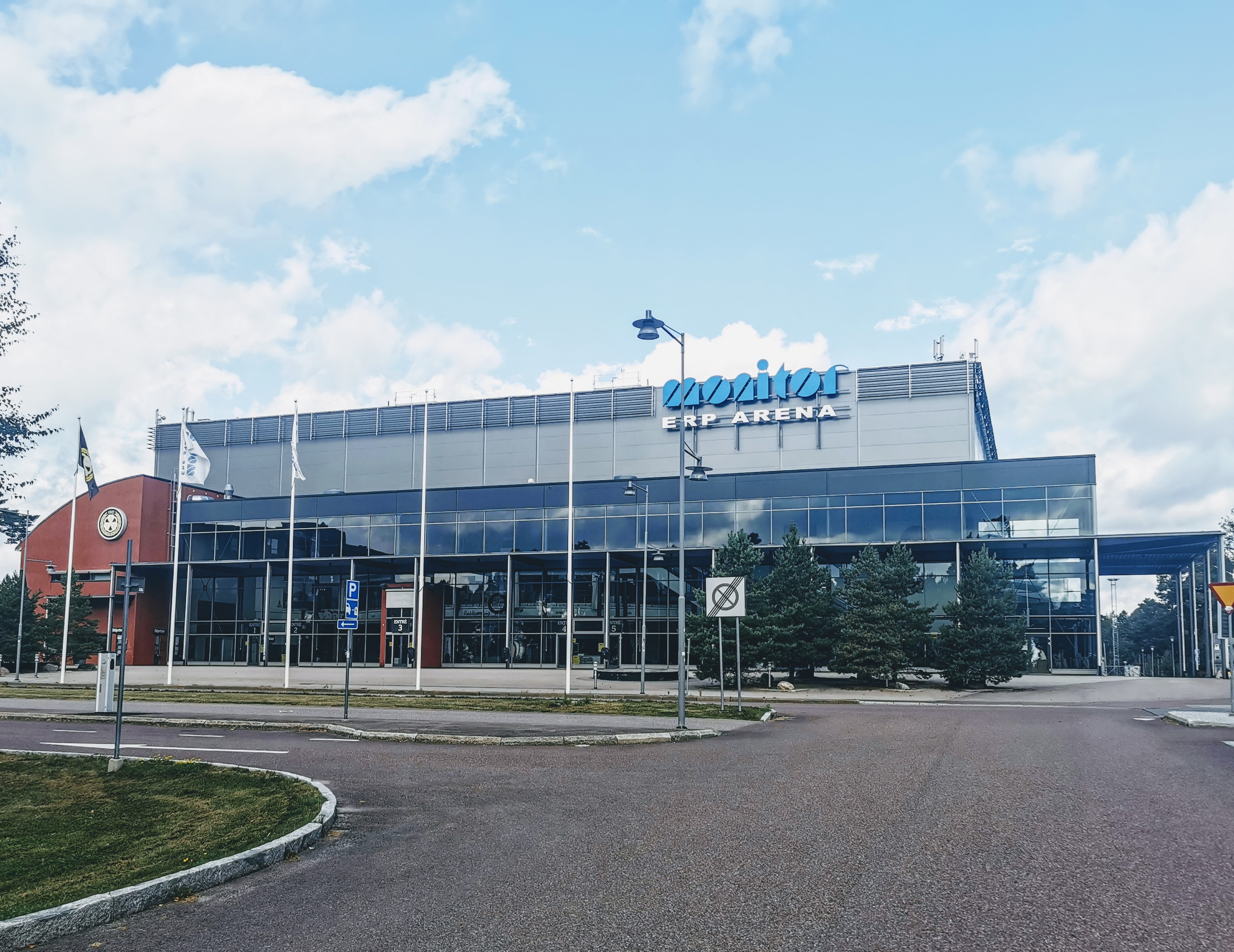
- Exterior

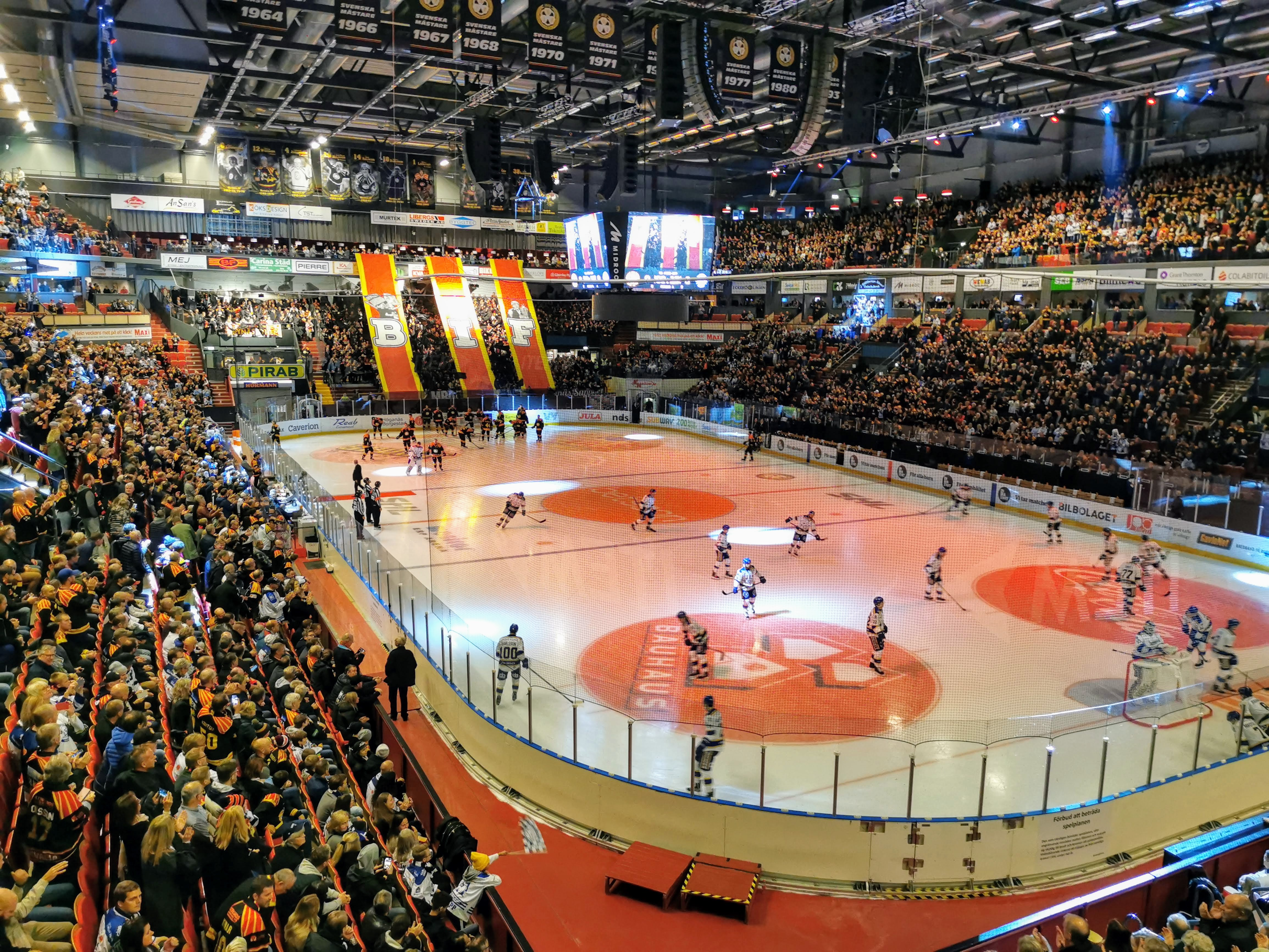
- Interior
- Interactive map of Monitor ERP Arena
- Former names: Gavlerinken (1967–2006; Läkerol Arena (2006–2014); Gavlerinken Arena (2014–2019))
- Location: Gävle, Sweden
- Coordinates: 60°41′28″N 17°07′56″E
- Owner: Brynäs IF (2005–present); Gävle Municipality (1967–2005)
- Capacity: Ice hockey: 8,240

Construction
- Opened: 28 September 1967; 58 years ago
- Renovated: 2006

Tenant
- Brynäs IF (SHL)

Monitor ERP Arena, formerly named Gavlerinken Arena (2014–2019), Läkerol Arena (2006–2014) and Gavlerinken (1967–2006), is an indoor sporting arena located in Gävle, Sweden. The capacity of the arena is 8,240 for ice hockey games and 11,000 for concerts which makes it the 8th largest ice hockey arena in Sweden. The arena is the home arena of the Brynäs IF ice hockey team.

The arena had in the early 2010s two 4 kW vertical axis wind turbine manufactured by Urban Green Energy. They have since been removed.

== History ==
Originally named Gavlerinken, the arena was opened on 28 September 1967. In 2005, the municipality of Gävle sold the arena to Brynäs IF which re-built it and sold the naming rights to Leaf Candy Company, manufacturer of the Läkerol pastilles, and it re-opened as Läkerol Arena on 13 November 2006. After the municipality of Gävle re-acquired the naming rights in June 2014, they changed the name of the arena to Gavlerinken Arena for the following five seasons (through 2018–19). Following the expiration of this deal, on 20 September 2019 a new deal was reached with Monitor ERP System to rename the arena Monitor ERP Arena for the following five seasons (through 2023–24).

In 2007 and 2016, the arena hosted a semi-final of Melodifestivalen.

== See also ==
- List of indoor arenas in Sweden
- List of indoor arenas in Nordic countries
