= Anton Axelsson =

Swedish ice hockey player (born 1986)

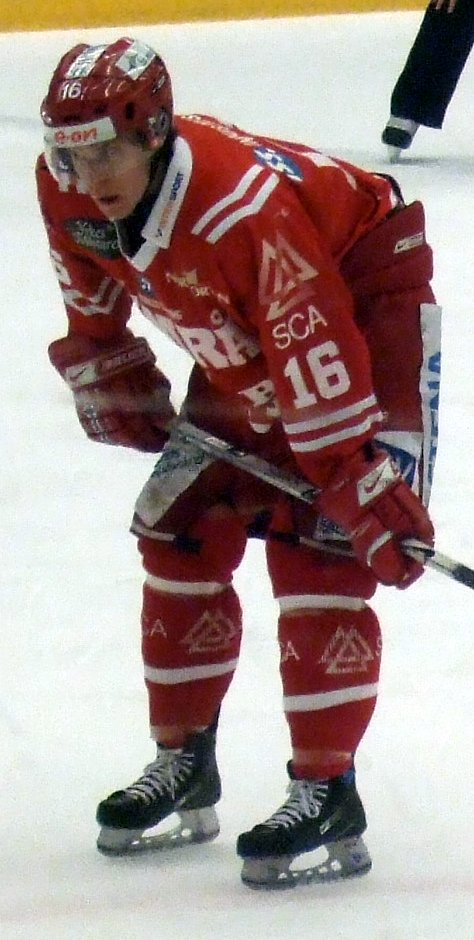
- Born: 16 January 1986 (age 40) Kungälv, Sweden
- Height: 6 ft 0 in (183 cm)
- Weight: 207 lb (94 kg; 14 st 11 lb)
- Position: Left wing
- Shot: Left
- Played for: Frölunda HC; Timrå IK
- NHL draft: 192nd overall, 2004; Detroit Red Wings
- Playing career: 2005–2016

Per Roger Anton Axelsson (born January 16, 1986), is a Swedish former professional ice hockey winger. He played for Frölunda HC and Timrå IK in the Swedish Hockey League (SHL).

Anton is the younger brother of P. J. Axelsson.

== Playing career ==
Born in Kungälv, Axelsson moved to Västra Frölunda as a youngster. He was drafted 192nd overall in the 2004 NHL entry draft by the Detroit Red Wings while playing for Frölunda HC U-20 team. He advanced to the senior team for the 2005–06 season and spent two seasons there before signing a two-year contract with Timrå in April 2007. After four years with the club, he headed back to Frölunda HC, where he played until the end of the 2015–16 campaign, in which he helped win the Swedish national championship and the Champions Hockey League title.

Being plagued by injuries for a long time, he announced the end of his playing career in late October 2016.

== Career statistics ==
=== Regular season and playoffs ===
| | | | Regular season | | | | | Playoffs |
| Season | Team | League | GP | G | A | Pts | PIM | GP | G | A | Pts | PIM |
|---|---|---|---|---|---|---|---|---|---|---|---|---|
| 2002–03 | Västra Frölunda HC | J18 Allsv | 14 | 11 | 12 | 23 | 2 | 6 | 3 | 7 | 10 | 0 |
| 2003–04 | Västra Frölunda HC | J18 Allsv | — | — | — | — | — | 5 | 2 | 2 | 4 | 0 |
| 2003–04 | Västra Frölunda HC | J20 | 28 | 7 | 10 | 17 | 14 | 5 | 0 | 1 | 1 | 2 |
| 2004–05 | Frölunda HC | J20 | 33 | 12 | 30 | 42 | 14 | 6 | 2 | 5 | 7 | 0 |
| 2005–06 | Frölunda HC | J20 | 12 | 6 | 11 | 17 | 2 | 1 | 0 | 1 | 1 | 0 |
| 2005–06 | Frölunda HC | SEL | 39 | 3 | 3 | 6 | 8 | 11 | 0 | 0 | 0 | 6 |
| 2006–07 | Frölunda HC | J20 | 9 | 4 | 2 | 6 | 12 | — | — | — | — | — |
| 2006–07 | Frölunda HC | SEL | 52 | 5 | 7 | 12 | 14 | — | — | — | — | — |
| 2007–08 | Timrå IK | SEL | 54 | 10 | 10 | 20 | 10 | 11 | 2 | 2 | 4 | 4 |
| 2008–09 | Timrå IK | SEL | 52 | 6 | 9 | 15 | 0 | 7 | 1 | 0 | 1 | 0 |
| 2009–10 | Timrå IK | SEL | 51 | 5 | 6 | 11 | 6 | 5 | 0 | 0 | 0 | 0 |
| 2010–11 | Timrå IK | SEL | 28 | 5 | 8 | 13 | 4 | — | — | — | — | — |
| 2011–12 | Frölunda HC | SEL | 42 | 5 | 6 | 11 | 16 | 6 | 1 | 1 | 2 | 0 |
| 2012–13 | Frölunda HC | SEL | 53 | 8 | 9 | 17 | 14 | 6 | 0 | 0 | 0 | 2 |
| 2013–14 | Frölunda HC | SHL | 55 | 12 | 6 | 18 | 33 | 7 | 2 | 0 | 2 | 0 |
| 2014–15 | Frölunda HC | SHL | 38 | 2 | 0 | 2 | 6 | 10 | 1 | 0 | 1 | 0 |
| 2015–16 | Frölunda HC | SHL | 19 | 0 | 1 | 1 | 0 | 11 | 2 | 0 | 2 | 0 |
| 2015–16 | Timrå IK | Allsv | 4 | 0 | 0 | 0 | 0 | — | — | — | — | — |
| SHL totals | | | 483 | 61 | 65 | 126 | 111 | 74 | 9 | 3 | 12 | 12 |

=== International ===
| Year | Team | Event | Result | GP | G | A | Pts | PIM |
|---|---|---|---|---|---|---|---|---|
| 2006 | Sweden | WJC | 5th | 6 | 1 | 0 | 1 | 6 |
| Junior totals | | | | 6 | 1 | 0 | 1 | 6 |

== Awards and honors ==
| Award | Year |
|---|---|
SHL
| Le Mat trophy (Frölunda HC) | 2016 |
CHL
| Champions (Frölunda HC) | 2016 |
