= Pierre Johnsson =

Swedish ice hockey player (born 1984)

- Born: February 7, 1984 (age 42) Karlstad, Sweden
- Height: 6 ft 2 in (188 cm)
- Weight: 198 lb (90 kg; 14 st 2 lb)
- Position: Defence
- Shot: Left
- Elitserien team Former teams: Retired; Mora IK; IF Troja/Ljungby; AIK IF; Luleå HF
- NHL draft: 207th overall, 2002; Calgary Flames
- Playing career: 2002–2013

Pierre Johnsson (born February 7, 1984) is a Swedish former professional ice hockey defenceman, who last played for Frölunda HC of the Elitserien. He was selected by the Calgary Flames in the 7th round (207th overall) of the 2002 NHL entry draft.

Johnsson played the 2010–11 season with Luleå HF of the Elitserien. In November 2013, Johnsson officially announced his retirement.

== Career statistics ==
=== Regular season and playoffs ===
			Regular season					Playoffs
Season	Team	League	GP	G	A	Pts	PIM	GP	G	A	Pts	PIM
2000–01	Färjestad BK	J18 Allsv	4	0	1	1	2	—	—	—	—	—
2000–01	Färjestad BK	J20	12	1	0	1	4	1	0	0	0	2
2001–02	Färjestad BK	J20	29	1	6	7	26	3	0	2	2	2
2002–03	Mora IK	J20	16	3	2	5	14	—	—	—	—	—
2002–03	Mora IK	Allsv	30	1	0	1	4	—	—	—	—	—
2003–04	Mora IK	Allsv	43	1	3	4	18	10	0	0	0	20
2004–05	Mora IK	J20	1	0	0	0	0	—	—	—	—	—
2004–05	Mora IK	SEL	1	0	0	0	0	—	—	—	—	—
2004–05	IF Troja/Ljungby	Allsv	33	1	11	12	24	6	0	1	1	4
2005–06	Mora IK	SEL	35	0	1	1	20	5	0	0	0	6
2005–06	AIK	Allsv	2	0	0	0	4	—	—	—	—	—
2006–07	Mora IK	SEL	48	4	5	9	30	4	0	0	0	2
2007–08	Mora IK	SEL	38	2	2	4	28	8	0	0	0	0
2008–09	Luleå HF	SEL	37	0	5	5	60	—	—	—	—	—
2009–10	Luleå HF	SEL	36	2	4	6	38	—	—	—	—	—
2010–11	Luleå HF	SEL	25	2	3	5	6	13	1	2	3	2
2011–12	Frölunda HC	SEL	44	1	7	8	28	5	1	0	1	2
2012–13	Frölunda HC	SEL	10	1	1	2	10	—	—	—	—	—
2013–14	Frölunda HC	SHL	2	0	0	0	4	—	—	—	—	—
SEL totals			276	12	28	40	222	35	2	2	4	12
Allsv totals			108	3	14	17	50	16	0	1	1	24

=== International ===
Year	Team	Event	GP	G	A	Pts	PIM
2004	Sweden	WJC	6	1	0	1	4
Junior totals			6	1	0	1	4
