= Christian Lechtaler =

Swedish ice hockey player and executive

- Born: February 10, 1972 (age 53) Gothenburg, Sweden
- Height: 6 ft 1 in (185 cm)
- Weight: 192 lb (87 kg; 13 st 10 lb)
- Position: Centre
- Shot: Left
- Played for: Frölunda HC; IF Björklöven; Gothiques d'Amiens
- Playing career: 1990–2008

Christian Lechtaler (born February 10, 1972) is a retired Swedish professional ice hockey centre, and currently president for Frölunda HC in the Swedish Hockey League.
