= Christoffer Persson =

Swedish professional ice hockey player (born 1985)

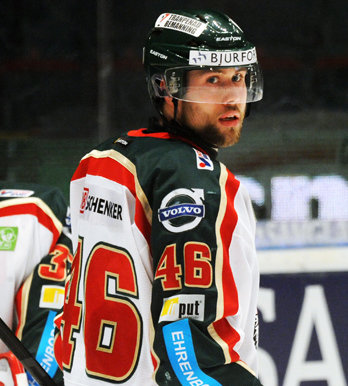
- Born: April 4, 1985 (age 40) Gothenburg, Sweden
- Height: 6 ft 3 in (191 cm)
- Weight: 220 lb (100 kg; 15 st 10 lb)
- Position: Defence
- Shot: Left
- Played for: Frölunda HC; Färjestad BK; HV71; HC TPS
- Playing career: 2005–2021

Christoffer Persson (born April 4, 1985) is a Swedish former professional ice hockey player who played in the Swedish Hockey League (SHL) for Frölunda HC, Färjestad BK and HV71 while also featuring in the Finnish Liiga for HC TPS.

== Career statistics ==
			Regular season					Playoffs
Season	Team	League	GP	G	A	Pts	PIM	GP	G	A	Pts	PIM
2002–03	Frölunda HC	J18	14	6	5	11	10	6	1	2	3	4
2002–03	Frölunda HC	J20	4	0	0	0	2	1	0	0	0	0
2003–04	Frölunda HC	J20	26	1	9	10	10	5	0	0	0	6
2004–05	Frölunda HC	J20	34	2	11	13	20	6	1	0	1	6
2005–06	Växjö Lakers	Allsv	42	2	2	4	63	—	—	—	—	—
2006–07	Växjö Lakers	Allsv	45	0	6	6	40	3	2	0	2	4
2007–08	Växjö Lakers	Allsv	45	2	8	10	60	3	0	0	0	4
2008–09	Växjö Lakers	Allsv	44	2	3	5	89	10	0	0	0	6
2009–10	Växjö Lakers	Allsv	51	0	16	16	46	10	1	0	1	18
2010–11	Rögle BK	Allsv	50	3	9	12	50	7	0	4	4	14
2011–12	Frölunda HC	SEL	52	1	5	6	38	6	0	0	0	4
2012–13	Frölunda HC	SEL	52	2	7	9	28	6	0	0	0	2
2013–14	Frölunda HC	SHL	48	1	1	2	32	7	0	1	1	4
2014–15	Frölunda HC	SHL	51	3	8	11	52	12	0	0	0	4
2015–16	Frölunda HC	SHL	32	0	4	4	20	13	0	2	2	14
2015–16	BIK Karlskoga	Allsv	4	0	3	3	2	—	—	—	—	—
2015–16	Färjestad BK	SHL	3	1	0	1	0	—	—	—	—	—
2016–17	HV71	SHL	48	0	7	7	28	16	0	3	3	16
2017–18	HV71	SHL	39	0	4	4	30	2	0	0	0	0
2018–19	HV71	SHL	24	0	3	3	24	6	0	0	0	4
2019–20	HV71	SHL	30	1	0	1	14	—	—	—	—	—
2019–20	HC TPS	Liiga	10	0	1	1	6	—	—	—	—	—
2020–21	HA74	Div.2	4	0	5	5	2	—	—	—	—	—
2020–21	HC Dalen	Div.1	27	3	5	8	16	2	0	0	0	0
SHL totals			379	9	39	48	266	68	0	6	6	48

== Awards and honors ==
Award	Year
SHL
Le Mat trophy (Frölunda HC)	2016
Le Mat trophy (HV71)	2017
