= Coop Norrbotten Arena =

Indoor sporting arena in Luleå, Sweden

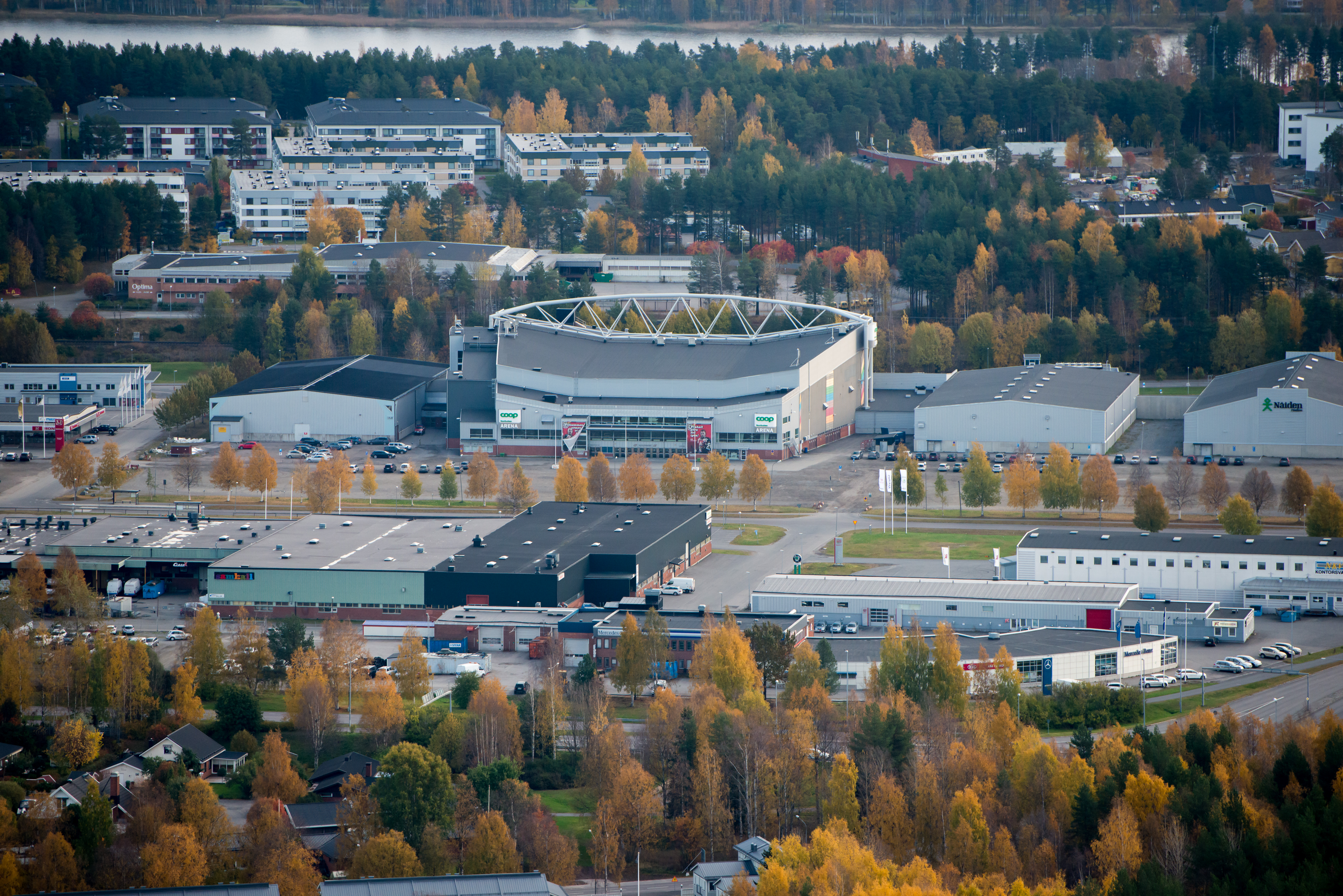
- Interactive map of Coop Norrbotten Arena
- Former names: Delfinen
- Location: Luleå, Sweden
- Owner: Luleå HF
- Capacity: 6,150

Construction
- Opened: 13 September 1970
- Renovated: 2002
- Expanded: 2009

Tenant
- Luleå HF

Coop Norrbotten Arena is an indoor sporting arena located in Luleå, Sweden. The seating capacity of the arena is 6,150, and it is the home arena of the Luleå HF ice hockey team.

== History ==
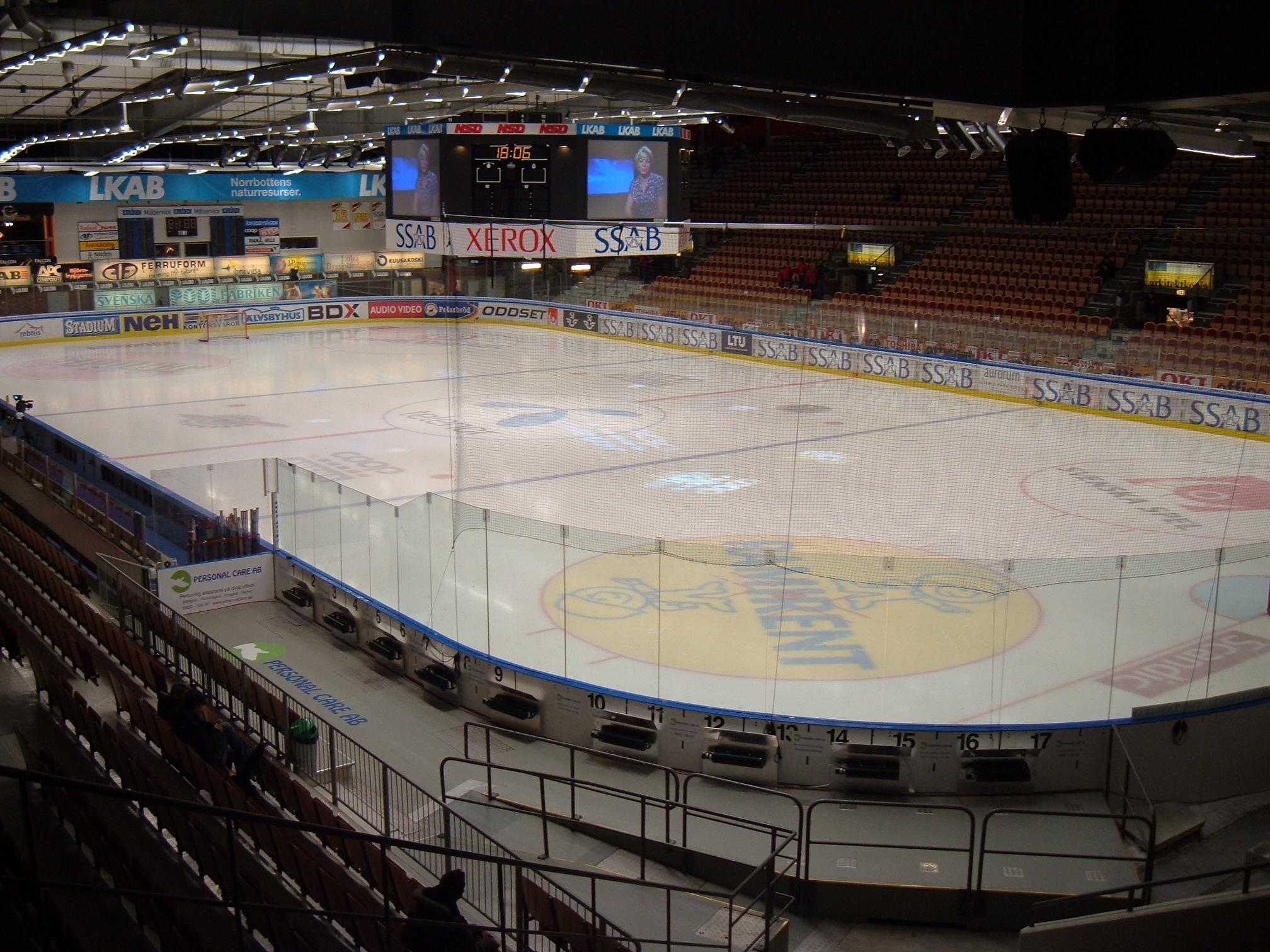
Interior of Coop Norrbotten Arena in 2006

It was opened on 13 September 1970, and was called Delfinen ("The Dolphin") until 2002 when it was refurbished and the naming rights were sold to the local division of the Swedish retail company Kooperativa Förbundet, who renamed it Coop Arena. In 2010, it was renamed Coop Norrbotten Arena, although it's still occasionally referred to as "Coop Arena".

The arena hosted the first semi-final of Melodifestivalen 2011 on 5 February 2011, and hosted the third semi-final of Melodifestivalen 2020 on 15 February 2020.

== See also ==
- List of indoor arenas in Sweden
- List of indoor arenas in Nordic countries
