= Linus Fernström =

Swedish ice hockey player

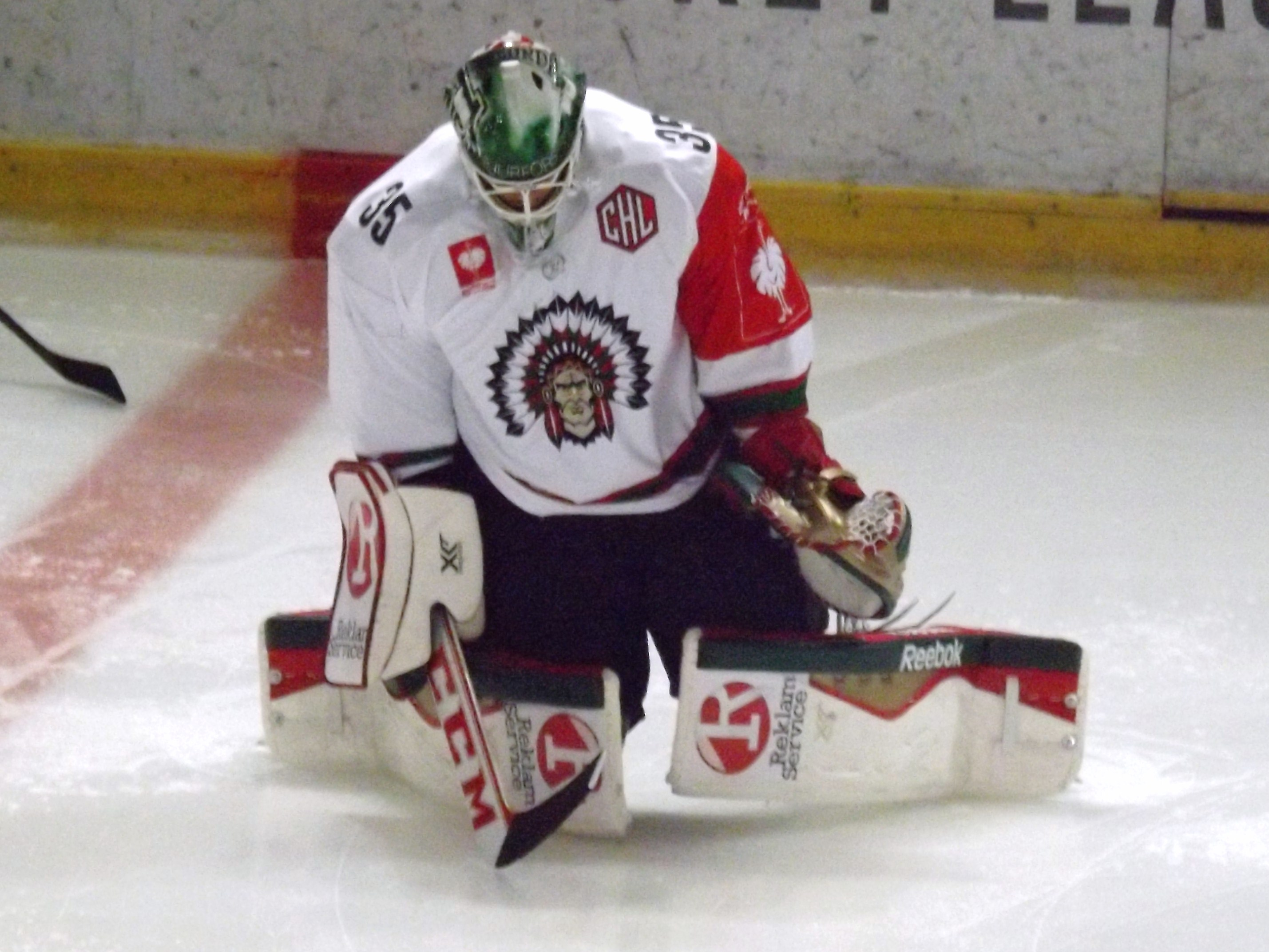
- Born: August 19, 1987 (age 38) Stenungsund, Sweden
- Height: 6 ft 5 in (196 cm)
- Weight: 216 lb (98 kg; 15 st 6 lb)
- Position: Goaltender
- Catches: Right
- SHL team Former teams: Brynäs IF; Frölunda HC; Karlskrona HK; HK Poprad
- Playing career: 2007–present

Linus Fernström (born April 10, 1987) is a Swedish professional ice hockey goaltender who currently plays for Brynäs IF in the Swedish Hockey League (SHL). He has formerly played with Frölunda HC and Karlskrona HK in the SHL. He split the 2016–17 season between HK Poprad of the Slovak Extraliga and IF Björklöven in the HockeyAllsvenskan (Allsv) before joining Brynäs IF.
