= 2007 Nordic Trophy =

Ice hockey competition

< 2006
2008 >

The 2007 Nordic Trophy was an ice hockey tournament played between August 9, 2007, and September 8, 2007. The final weekend was played in Helsinki, Finland, at the Helsinki Ice Hall. Oulun Kärpät won the final over Frölunda HC.

== Standings ==
Team	GP	W	L	T	GF	GA	Pts	OTW	OTL	PSW	PSL
(Finland) Oulun Kärpät	7	4	1	2	25	19	11	1	0	0	1
(Sweden) Frölunda HC	7	4	1	2	25	25	11	0	0	1	1
(Finland) Tappara	7	3	2	2	20	15	10	1	0	1	0
(Sweden) Färjestad BK	7	3	2	2	27	22	9	0	1	1	0
(Finland) TPS	7	2	3	2	19	23	7	0	0	1	1
(Sweden) Linköpings HC	7	2	4	1	19	17	6	1	0	0	0
(Sweden) Djurgårdens IF	7	2	4	1	19	21	5	0	1	0	0
(Finland) HIFK	7	1	4	2	16	28	4	0	1	0	1

== Game log ==
All times local

=== Round 1 ===
August 8, 2007; 18:30	(Finland) Oulun Kärpät	3–4	(Finland) Tappara	Oulun Energia Areena, Oulu; Attendance: 2011

August 14, 2007; 19:00	(Sweden) Frölunda HC	3–2	(Sweden) Djurgårdens IF	Oasen, Kungälv; Attendance: 900

August 14, 2007; 19:00	(Sweden) Färjestad BK	4–3	(Sweden) Linköpings HC	Klingevi Ishall, Munkfors; Attendance: 808

August 16, 2007; 18:30	(Finland) HIFK	3–4 (SO)	(Finland) TPS	Helsinki Ice Hall, Helsinki; Attendance: 2105

=== Round 2 ===
August 16, 2007; 19:00	(Sweden) Djurgårdens IF	1–2 (OT)	(Sweden) Linköpings HC	Bahcohallen, Enköping; Attendance: 692

August 16, 2007; 19:00	(Sweden) Frölunda HC	4–5 (SO)	(Sweden) Färjestad BK	Borås Ishall, Borås; Attendance: 1886

August 18, 2007; 17:00	(Finland) Oulun Kärpät	3–2 (OT)	(Finland) HIFK	Oulun Energia Areena, Oulu; Attendance: 5027

August 28, 2007; 17:00	(Finland) TPS	2–3 (SO)	(Finland) Tappara	Turkuhalli, Turku; Attendance: 1905

=== Round 3 ===
August 22, 2007; 18:30	(Finland) Oulun Kärpät	6–5	(Sweden) Djurgårdens IF	Oulun Energia Areena, Oulu; Attendance: 5012

August 22, 2007; 18:30	(Finland) TPS	4–0	(Sweden) Linköpings HC	Turkuhalli, Turku; Attendance: 1846

August 22, 2007; 18:30	(Finland) Tappara	2–3	(Sweden) Frölunda HC	Lempäälän Jäähalli, Lempäälä; Attendance: N/A

August 16, 2007; 18:30	(Finland) HIFK	5–3	(Sweden) Färjestad BK	Helsinki Ice Hall, Helsinki; Attendance: 1230

=== Round 4 ===
August 23, 2007; 18:30	(Finland) Oulun Kärpät	3–2	(Sweden) Linköpings HC	Oulun Energia Areena, Oulu; Attendance: 3502

August 23, 2007; 18:30	(Finland) TPS	2–1	(Sweden) Djurgårdens IF	Turkuhalli, Turku; Attendance: 1744

August 23, 2007; 18:30	(Finland) Tappara	3–2 (OT)	(Sweden) Färjestad BK	Hakametsä, Tampere; Attendance: 1112

August 23, 2007; 18:30	(Finland) HIFK	2–3	(Sweden) Frölunda HC	Helsinki Ice Hall, Helsinki; Attendance: 1323

=== Round 5 ===
August 28, 2007; 19:00	(Sweden) Frölunda HC	3–2 (SO)	(Finland) Oulun Kärpät	Borås Ishall, Borås; Attendance: 1035

August 29, 2007; 19:00	(Sweden) Djurgårdens IF	7–2	(Finland) HIFK	Vallentuna Ishall, Vallentuna; Attendance: 1304

August 29, 2007; 19:00	(Sweden) Färjestad BK	5–2	(Finland) TPS	Fermihallen, Arvika; Attendance: 1500

August 29, 2007; 19:00	(Sweden) Linköpings HC	1–3	(Finland) Tappara	Elektrolux Hallen, Motala; Attendance: 1080

=== Round 6 ===
August 30, 2007; 19:00	(Sweden) Linköpings HC	4–0	(Finland) HIFK	Cloetta Center, Linköping; Attendance: 1834

August 30, 2007; 19:00	(Sweden) Färjestad BK	3–4	(Finland) Oulun Kärpät	Björkhallen, Kristinehamn; Attendance: 1500

August 30, 2007; 19:00	(Sweden) Frölunda HC	7–5	(Finland) TPS	Länsförsäkringar Arena, Kungsbacka; Attendance: 1667

August 30, 2007; 19:00	(Sweden) Djurgårdens IF	2–1	(Finland) Tappara	Contigahallen, Norrtälje; Attendance: 483

=== Round 7 ===
September 4, 2007; 18:30	(Finland) TPS	0–4	(Finland) Oulun Kärpät	Turkuhalli, Turku; Attendance: 2206

September 4, 2007; 18:30	(Finland) Tappara	4–2	(Finland) HIFK	Hakametsä, Tampere; Attendance: 2002

September 4, 2007; 19:00	(Sweden) Linköpings HC	7–2	(Sweden) Frölunda HC	BT-Rinken, Mjölby; Attendance: 1210

September 4, 2007; 19:00	(Sweden) Färjestad BK	5–1	(Sweden) Djurgårdens IF	Löfbergs Lila Arena, Karlstad; Attendance: 2944

== Finals ==
=== 7th prize ===
September 8, 2007; 15:00	(Sweden) Djurgårdens IF	6–4	(Finland) HIFK	Helsinki Ice Hall, Helsinki; Attendance: 421

=== 5th prize ===
September 7, 2007; 15:30	(Finland) TPS	3–2	(Sweden) Linköpings HC	Helsinki Ice Hall, Helsinki; Attendance: N/A

=== 3rd prize ===
September 7, 2007; 19:30	(Finland) Tappara	2–3	(Sweden) Färjestad BK	Helsinki Ice Hall, Helsinki; Attendance: 390

=== 1st prize ===
September 8, 2007; 19:00	(Finland) Oulun Kärpät	5–2	(Sweden) Frölunda HC	Helsinki Ice Hall, Helsinki; Attendance: 1124

=== Final ranking ===
- 1. (Finland) Oulun Kärpät
- 2. (Sweden) Frölunda HC
- 3: (Sweden) Färjestad BK
- 4: (Finland) Tappara
- 5: (Finland) TPS
- 6: (Sweden) Linköpings HC
- 7: (Sweden) Djurgårdens IF
- 8: (Finland) HIFK

== Individual honours ==
After every game in the Nordic Trophy, three players get Most Valuable Player (MVP) honors called RBK Nordic Stars. The player who has collected most stars prior to the final round is awarded the RBK Nordic Star Award as the tournaments MVP. Awards are also presented to best defenceman, forward, and goaltender, voted by the directors of the Nordic Trophy.

RBK Nordic Star 2007

- Tomi Kallio, Frölunda HC

Best defenceman

- Lee Sweatt, TPS

Best forward

- Niklas Andersson, Frölunda HC

Best goaltender

- Tuomas Tarkki, Oulun Kärpät
