= 2008 Nordic Trophy Junior =

International junior ice hockey tournament in Sweden

The 2008 Nordic Trophy Junior was the second Nordic Trophy Junior ice hockey tournament, played 21-24 August 2008. All games were played at the JM-hallen and Stora Mossen arenas.

== Participating clubs ==
The 2008 tournament featured 8 teams from Sweden and Finland.

Group A
Team	City
(Sweden) Djurgårdens IF	Stockholm
(Sweden) Färjestads BK	Karlstad
(Finland) Tappara	Tampere
(Finland) TPS	Turku

Group B
Team	City
(Sweden) Frölunda HC	Gothenburg
(Finland) HIFK	Helsinki
(Sweden) Linköpings HC	Linköping
(Finland) Kärpät	Oulu

== Regulation round ==
=== Group A ===
==== Standings ====
Team	GP	W	OTW/SOW	OTL/SOL	L	GF	GA	DIF	PTS
(Sweden) Djurgårdens IF	3	3	0	0	0	8	5	+3	9
(Sweden) Färjestads BK	3	1	1	0	0	10	4	+6	5
(Finland) TPS	3	0	1	1	1	8	9	–1	3
(Finland) Tappara	3	0	0	1	2	5	13	–8	1

==== Games ====
===== 21 August =====
- Djurgårdens IF – Tappara 3 – 2 (1–0, 2–1, 0–1)
- TPS – Färjestads BK 2 – 3 SD (1–0, 1–1, 0–1, 0–1)

===== 22 August =====
- Tappara – TPS 3 – 4 GWS (0–1, 0–2, 3–0, 0–0, 0–1)
- Färjestads BK – Djurgårdens IF 1 – 2 (0–0, 1–1, 0–1)

===== 23 August =====
- Djurgårdens IF – TPS 3 – 2 (1–1, 2–0, 0–1)
- Tappara – Färjestads BK 0 – 6 (0–0, 0–4, 0–2)

=== Group B ===
==== Standings ====
Team	GP	W	OTW/SOW	OTL/SOL	L	GF	GA	DIF	PTS
(Finland) Kärpät	3	2	1	0	0	13	7	+6	8
(Finland) HIFK	3	1	1	1	0	9	6	+3	6
(Sweden) Frölunda HC	3	0	1	0	2	7	10	–3	2
(Sweden) Linköpings HC	3	0	0	2	1	8	14	–6	2

==== Games ====
===== 21 August =====
- Frölunda HC – HIFK 0 – 3 (0–1, 0–0, 0–2)
- Kärpät – Linköpings HC 6 – 2 (3–1, 2–0, 1–1)

===== 22 August =====
- HIFK – Kärpät 2 – 3 SD (1–1, 0–1, 1–0, 0–1)
- Linköpings HC – Frölunda HC 3 – 4 SD (1–0, 2–2, 0–1, 0–1)

===== 23 August =====
- HIFK – Linköpings HC 4 – 3 SD (1–1, 1–2, 1–0, 1–0)
- Frölunda HC – Kärpät 3 – 4 (0–2, 2–0, 1–2)

== Playoffs ==
=== 24 August ===
- Final: Djurgårdens IF – Kärpät 5 – 1 (2–1, 2–0, 1–0)
- Bronze medal game: HIFK – Färjestads BK 1 – 3 (1–3, 0–0, 0–0)
- 5th place game: TPS – Frölunda HC 1 – 3 (1–0, 0–3, 0–0)
- 7th place game: Linköpings HC – Tappara 2 – 6 (1–1, 0–3, 1–2)

== Final standings ==
Gold medal	(Sweden) Djurgårdens IF
Silver medal	(Finland) Kärpät
Bronze medal	(Sweden) Färjestads BK
4	(Finland) HIFK
5	(Sweden) Frölunda HC
6	(Finland) TPS
7	(Finland) Tappara
8	(Sweden) Linköpings HC
