= Sebastian Collberg =

Swedish ice hockey player (born 1994)

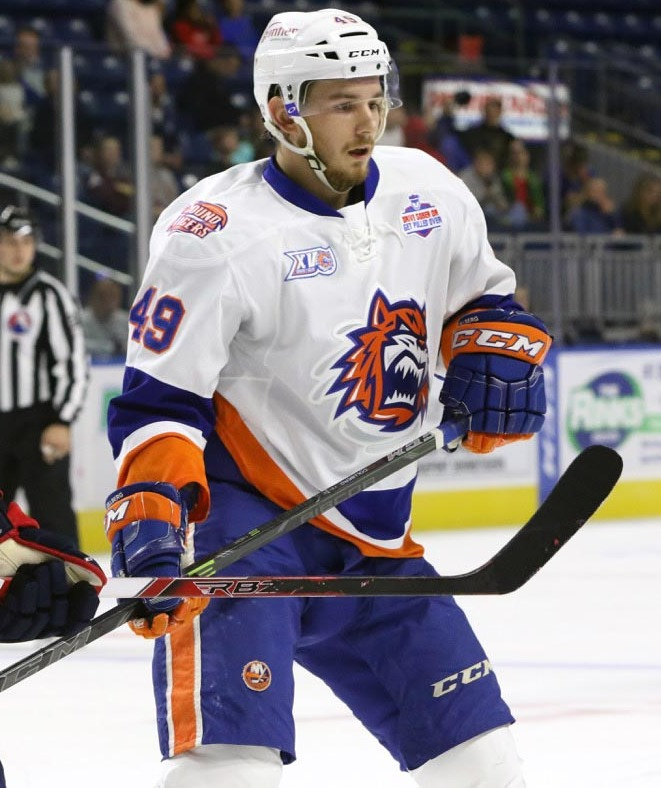
- Collberg with the Bridgeport Sound Tigers during the 2015-16 season
- Born: February 23, 1994 (age 32) Mariestad, Sweden
- Height: 5 ft 11 in (180 cm)
- Weight: 181 lb (82 kg; 12 st 13 lb)
- Position: Right wing
- Shoots: Right
- Current team Former teams: Free agent Frölunda HC; Rögle BK; Timrå IK; Graz 99ers
- NHL draft: 33rd overall, 2012; Montreal Canadiens
- Playing career: 2010–present

Erik Sebastian Collberg (born February 23, 1994) is a Swedish professional ice hockey right winger who is an unrestricted free agent. He was selected in the second round, 33rd overall, by the Montreal Canadiens in the 2012 NHL entry draft.

== Playing career ==
=== Mariestad ===
Collberg practiced figure skating before starting to play youth hockey for his hometown team Mariestad BoIS HC. Before having played in any of Sweden's major junior leagues Collberg made his senior debut for Mariestad during the 2007–08 season in Division 1—Sweden's third-tier league—in the playoffs for promotion to Sweden's second-tier league HockeyAllsvenskan, on March 8, 2008, two weeks after his 14th birthday, in a 3–4 overtime loss against Valbo HC. After having been spotted by a Canadian coach Collberg was invited to travel to Toronto for a summer tournament together with Canada's best 14 year old players.

During the 2008–09 season, at age 14, Collberg debuted for Mariestad in the J18 Elit, scoring eight goals and eight assist for 16 points in 16 games, which was the highest point total for players under 15-years of age in the league. And in the J20 Elit, scoring four goals and four assists for eight points in 21 games, which was also the highest point total for players under 15-years of age in the league—Collberg being one of only two under 15 players appearing in the league, the other being Simon Erlandsson who played one game. During the season Collberg represented Västergötland's district team for players born 1993, winning gold at the 2008 U16 Scandinavium Cup, with Collberg scoring one goal and one assist in seven games. In the spring he joined Västergötland's 1993-team again in Rikspucken, a one-time tournament for junior players who became too old for TV-pucken when the Swedish Ice Hockey Association lowered the maximum age from 16 to 15. As an under age player, Collberg tied sixth in scoring with seven goals, eleven points, in nine games, as Västergötland finished eight in the tournament.

The following season in the 2009 TV-pucken Collberg finished tenth in the tournament in scoring with six goals, eleven points, in eight games, as Västergötland finished 13th in the tournament. In the J18 Elit, Collberg scored twelve goals, 15 assist for 27 points in 15 games, and in the J20 Elit 24 goals, 14 assists for 38 points in 24 games, which was the most points by any player under 16-years of age. Collberg made his regular season debut as a 15-year old in Division 1, playing four games in total, Collberg scored one goal on February 17, 2010, in his debut, a 2–4 loss at Tingsryds AIF.

=== Frölunda ===
For the 2010–11 season Collberg signed with Frölunda HC to play for their junior organisation. His first appearance with the club came during the Junior European Trophy, where he led Frölunda to the championship title—scoring the game tying goal and later the game-winning goal in the shootout against Malmö in the final. With six goals and one assist in five games he was selected to the tournament All-Star Team. Collberg then joined the senior team as an extra player for a game against Tappara in the 2010 European Trophy. Collberg made his senior debut in the Elitserien on September 30, 2010, as the then youngest player ever for Frölunda, and the then sixth youngest ever in the league. In total he appeared in five games in Elitserien, scoring no points.

During the autumn Collberg played just three games with the under 18 team in the J18 Elit, scoring two goals and six points. Frölunda finished third in the south division and qualified for J18 Allsvenskan, where Collberg played five games, scoring seven goals, ten points. Frölunda's J18 team finished second in the standings and were directly qualified for the quarter-finals where they faced Leksands IF in a best of three series. Frölunda lost the first game at Leksand, and when the series returned to Gothenburg Collberg who primarily played with the J20 team joined the J18 team, leading them to two wins at home and a place in the semi final. The semifinals and finals were played April 8–9 at the Ericsson Globe in Stockholm, Frölunda won their semifinal against Brynäs IF 4–3, and faced off against local Stockholm team Djurgårdens IF in the final, winning the game 2–1, Frölunda became Swedish Champions for under 18 year old's.

Collberg spent the majority of the season with the under 20 team in the J20 SuperElit—Sweden's premier junior league. In 35 games Collberg scored 21 goals, and 23 assist for a total of 44 points, surpassing Victor Rask as the then all-time high point total leader for a sixteen-year olds in the J20 SuperElit. Frölunda finished fifth in the south division, and missed the Top 8 for the first time since its implementation for the 2005–06 season. Frölunda qualified for the playoffs by winning the south continuation series. In the eighth-final Frölunda faced Brynäs IF who finished last in the Top 8, Frölunda won the best of three series in two games after having won 11–0 at home and 5–2 on the road. In the quarter-finals Frölunda faced Rögle BK who were directly qualified after having finished fourth in the Top 8, Frölunda won their home game, lost the first game on the road but won the decisive game three in Ängelholm. The semifinals and finals were played April 9–10 at the Ericsson Globe in Stockholm, Frölunda won their semifinal against HV71 2–1. In the final Frölunda faced Skellefteå AIK, Skellefteå scored three goals in the first period, Frölunda tied the game in the second period and in the third while short-handed Collberg scored Frölunda's fourth goal, which turned out to be the championship clinching goal, and later scored Frölunda's fifth goal as well, the final score being 6–3 and Frölunda won the Anton Cup, awarded to the Swedish under 20 champions. In total, Collberg appeared in seven playoff games, scoring four goals and five assists.

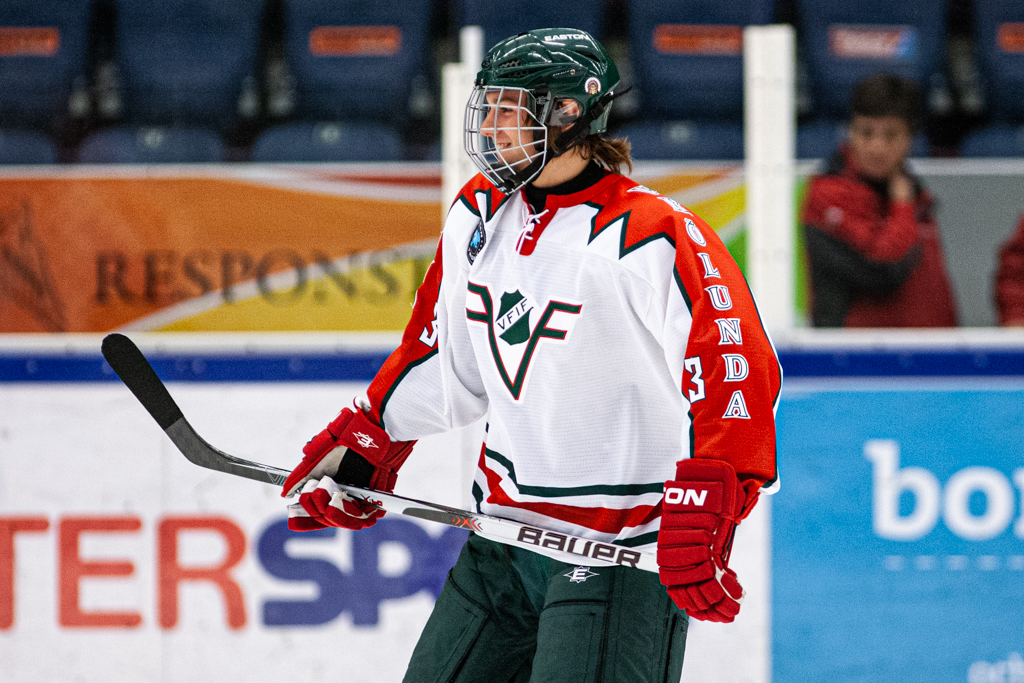
Collberg playing for Frölunda HC

For the 2011–12 season Collberg had earned a roster spot with Frölunda's men's team in Elitserien. He played one game in the 2011 European Trophy, scoring a goal in a 5–1 win over Adler Mannheim. In January Collberg received the award for 2011's best male junior by Göteborgs-Posten. On February 4 Frölunda played a home game against Timrå IK, in the second period Timrå's Nichlas Torp delivered a blind-sided hit with his shoulder, away from the play, to Collberg's head. Collberg laid motionless on the ice for a few minutes before managing to get of the ice on his own. Collberg withstood the hit without suffering a concussion, but was unable to continue playing in the game. Torp received a match penalty for charging, and was later suspended for seven games, of which three were converted into a 21,000 SEK fine instead. In total Collberg appeared in 41 Elitserien games, averaging just under seven minutes of ice time per game, without registering any points. Collberg also played 21 regular season games in the J20 SuperElit, scoring nine goals and eight assists, and appeared in two playoff games without registering any points. Having only played one regular season game in J18 Allsvenskan, scoring one goal and one assist, Collberg joined the under 18 team for the playoffs, scoring three goals and three assist in four games, earning him the award as best forward in the playoffs, as Frölunda won the bronze medal in the Swedish under 18 championships with a 4–2 win over Brynäs IF, where Collberg scored one goal.

On May 18, 2012, Collberg signed a one-year professional contract with Frölunda for the 2012–13 season. On June 23, 2012, Collberg was selected in the second round, 33rd overall, by the Montreal Canadiens of the National Hockey League (NHL) in the 2012 NHL entry draft. Collberg scored his first point in Elitserien on September 22 in an away game against Färjestad, when he assisted Jari Tolsa on the game winning 2–3 goal. Frölunda acquired Matt Duchene and Viktor Stålberg during the 2012–13 NHL lockout to replace injured players, and after Collberg only having recorded two assists in 16 games to start the season, and struggling with getting ice time, Collberg was loaned to Örebro HK in the second tier HockeyAllsvenskan on October 23, 2012. Collberg scored in his first game with Örebro, and in total scored six goals and two assists in 15 games. He was then, prior to the 2013 World Junior Ice Hockey Championships, loaned for one game to his hometown team Mariestad, scoring one goal and one assist in a 5–4 win over Vimmerby HC, helping Mariestad secure a spot in the continuation series AllEttan Södra for the remainder of the season. After the 2013 World Junior Ice Hockey Championships Collberg returned to Frölunda and scored his first goal in Elitserien, a game-winning goal in a shootout against Timrå IK's Daniel Bellissimo on January 15, 2013 in Scandinavium. The following game on January 18 at Linköping HC Collberg scored his second goal on a penalty shot and his third goal, again a game winner in a shootout. After having picked up an assist against Brynäs IF on January 22, Collberg for the third game in a row scored the game-winning goal in a shootout. Two days later again against Brynäs, Collberg scored his first non penalty shot goal in 5–2 win on the road. Collberg signed a one-year contract extension on February 6, 2013. Collberg collected his first playoff point with an assisted to Fabian Brunnström in a 2–0 win in game two against Luleå HF in the quarterfinals, and his second point when he assisted Mathis Olimb on Fröllunda's 4–3 overtime winning goal 14:58 into the second overtime period of game four, which tied the best of seven series at 2–2. Frölunda lost the following two games and were eliminated from the playoffs, Collberg missed the last game due to a concussion. In total Collberg appeared in 35 regular season Elitserien games, scoring six goals and three assists, and five playoff games registering two assists. He also played one regular season game and two playoff games in J20 SuperElit, without scoring any points. Collberg finished the season with the Montreal Canadiens' American Hockey League (AHL) affiliate the Hamilton Bulldogs on a try-out, playing two games without ending up on the score sheet.

Collberg signed a three-year entry level contract with the Montreal Canadiens on May 21, 2013, with the intention of Collberg staying in Sweden and honouring his contract with Frölunda. Collberg was troubled by a knee injury and missed most of Frölunda's pre-season games. He attended the Canadiens' main training camp, playing three pre-season games he recorded one assist, before returning to Frölunda. With former national junior team head coach Roger Rönnberg—who had coached Collberg in both the 2012 and 2013 World Junior Ice Hockey Championships—taking over as head coach of Frölunda for the 2013–14 season, many believed Collberg would have a breakthrough season at professional level. He did however not manage to fully convince and had a "choppy season", troubled by a concussion during the winter, Collberg scored three goals and six assists in 40 regular season games, and only played one playoff game before dislocating his shoulder, missing the rest of the playoffs. At age 19 he was in his final year of junior eligibility and only played three games in the J20 SuperElit, scoring five goals and one assist, and one playoff game where he had one assist. On March 5, 2014, the Montreal Canadiens traded Collberg and a conditional 2nd round pick in the 2014 NHL entry draft to the New York Islanders in exchange for left winger Thomas Vanek and a conditional 5th round pick in the 2014 NHL Entry Draft.

=== Bridgeport ===
After having a shoulder surgery during the summer Collberg joined the New York Islanders in hopes of making their NHL roster, during the pre-season he scored a goal in his first game, a 3–2 overtime win against the Ottawa Senators on September 22, 2014. Collberg started the 2014–15 season with the Islanders AHL affiliate the Bridgeport Sound Tigers, he scored one goal and one assist in his first three games before suffering a groin injury on October 25, which kept him out of play until November 21. He got praised early on by Bridgeport's head coach Brent Thompson saying "His speed is dynamic. He's coachable. He's got really good defensive awareness." Returning from his injury Collberg struggled offensively, and after not having produced any points for seven straight games he was sent down to the Stockton Thunder of the East Coast Hockey League (ECHL) on December 3. With Stockton Collberg found his confidence and scoring touch, after having scored four goals and three assists in six games Collberg was called back up to Bridgeport on December 20. In his first game back with Bridgeport Collberg scored one goal in a 2–0 win against the Providence Bruins on December 26, and followed it up the next day with one goal and one assist in a 5–0 win against the Wilkes-Barre/Scranton Penguins. Collberg had six points in eight games after returning to Bridgeport, before suffering a minor injury which kept him out of play for two games, and then after a brief four game stint falling into the boards during a game against the Portland Pirates on January 23, which kept him out for over a month again. Collberg didn't score his next goal until March 7, the game-winning goal in a 4–3 win against the Worcester Sharks, where he also had an assist in the game. In total, Collberg scored four goals and 14 assist for a total of 18 points in 43 games. Bridgeport finished last in the Northeast Division, and did not qualify for playoff contention.

For the 2015–16 season, Collberg again didn't make the cut for the Islanders' NHL roster and was assigned to Bridgeport. After having been a healthy scratch to start the season due to an abundance of right wingers, Collberg played only two games before getting injured which made him miss five games. He scored his first goal of the season in a 4–0 win against the Springfield Falcons on November 7, and his second goal on November 11 in a 4–3 win over the Providence Bruins. After having scored an empty net goal on December 6, Collberg had trouble keeping a spot on the roster after Christmas, and from January 16 he only played in 13 of Bridgeport's last 36 games of the regular season. He finished the regular season with a record of three goals and seven assist in 42 regular season games. In the 2016 Calder Cup playoffs Colllberg had a resurgence in his game, but went scoreless when Bridgeport were eliminated in three games in the best of five division semifinals against the Toronto Marlies.

=== Back to Sweden ===
On May 13, 2016, the New York Islanders placed Collberg on unconditional waivers in order to terminate the final year of his contract. He then returned to Sweden for the 2016–17 season, signing a two-year contract with Rögle BK of the SHL. With Rögle's general manager Anders Carlsson stating that they recruited him as their sniper, hoping they could get Collberg to reach his potential from juniors at the senior level. Collberg choose Rögle who were newcomers in the SHL the season prior, hoping to get a more offensive role than he could get with his former team Frölunda, who were reigning Swedish Champions, and have a similar career resurrection as his former teammates from the national junior team Patrick Cehlin and Sebastian Wännström who choose Rögle the season before. Collberg scored six goals and seven assists in 45 games, Rögle struggled during the season and finished 13th in the standings, second to last, which forced them to play in the 2017 SHL qualifiers to defend their SHL status. Rögle won the best of seven series against their opponent BIK Karlskoga from HockeyAllsvenskan in four games and qualified for the SHL the following season, with Collberg scoring one goal and two assists.

During the 2017–18 season, just one game after Cam Abbott had taken over as head coach of Rögle midway through the season Collberg got a cut from a skate blade on his thigh and was out injured for over a month. Shortly after having healed from his injury he suffered a season ending injury when he broke his wrist during a game on February 1, 2018, against Brynäs IF. In total Collberg scored four goals and five assist in 35 games. Having not had the breakout he nor Rögle had hoped for during his two seasons with them, Collberg signed a two-year contract with Timrå IK who had just earned promotion to the SHL for the 2018–19 season. Collberg had a flying start with Timrå, scoring their first goal of the season, and stood noted for four goals and one assist after eight games, and just 13 games into the season he had tied his previous seasons point total at nine points. Collberg suffered a knee injury and had to leave the ice during a game against Mora IK on November 15, the injury kept troubling him the following weeks and his production sharply dropped, his last point of the season was an assist on December 19 and by January he had already missed six games. The injury kept reappearing and he finished the regular season only having played 37 out of the 52 regular season games, scoring seven goals and four assists. Timrå as newcomers in the league finished 14th in the standings, which forced them to play in the 2019 SHL qualifiers to defend their SHL status. Timrå lost the best of seven series against IK Oskarshamn from HockeyAllsvenskan in the decisive game seven, and were thus relegated to HockeyAllsvenskan for the next season. Collberg played in five of the seven qualifying games, without registering any points. Having one year left on his contract with Timrå Collberg opted to use an out clause after they were relegated.

=== Austria and Germany ===
For the 2019–20 season Collberg signed a one-year contract with Austrian club Graz 99ers of the Erste Bank Eishockey Liga (EBEL). One of Collberg first appearances with Graz was an away game against his former team Frölunda in the 2019–20 Champions Hockey League tournament. Collberg scored one goal in the first period, and later one goal on a penalty shot in the shootout which resulted in a surprising 6–5 victory for Graz. The win was Graz's only win in the group stage and they finished last in their group after six games played and did not qualify for the round of 16 in the playoffs. Collberg appeared in four games through the tournament scoring one goal. During the EBEL regular season Collberg was again troubled by injures, missing seven weeks at the start of the season with an elbow injury, and another six weeks to a finger injury in December. In total Collberg appeared in 27 regular season games, scoring four goals and nine assist. In the playoffs Graz were trailing Vienna Capitals one game to two when the playoffs were canceled due to the COVID-19 pandemic, Collberg had no points in the three playoff games.

For the 2020–21 Collberg signed a with Löwen Frankfurt of the German second-tier league Deutsche Eishockey Liga 2 (DEL2), Frankfurt acquired Collberg in their push to reach the top tier DEL, since it was the first season in 15 years that promotion and relegation was allowed again. During the regular season Collberg scored 13 goals and 22 assists for a total of 35 points in 39 games, as Frankfurt finished fifth in the league. In the playoffs Collberg scored four goals and one assist in five games as Frankfurt lost two games to three in the quarterfinals against the eventually qualification playoff winners Bietigheim Steelers.

=== Back to Sweden, again ===
For the 2021–22 season Collberg returned to Sweden, signing a two-year contract with BIK Karlskoga in HockeyAllsvenskan. He got injured during practice before the regular season started and made his season debut on November 17, having missed the first 15 games of the season. He scored his first goal on December 18 in a 4–2 win over Västerås IK. He missed eight games due to COVID-19 after the new year. Collberg appeared in 21 regular season games, scoring two goals and five assist. Karlskoga finished third in the league and qualified for the playoffs where they won the best of seven quarterfinals series four game to one against Mora IK, but lost the semifinal series against HV71 in four straight games. Collberg had five assist through eight games in the playoffs.

During the 2022–23 season, troubled by concussion symptoms, Collberg only played one game, scoring one goal and one assist.

== International play ==
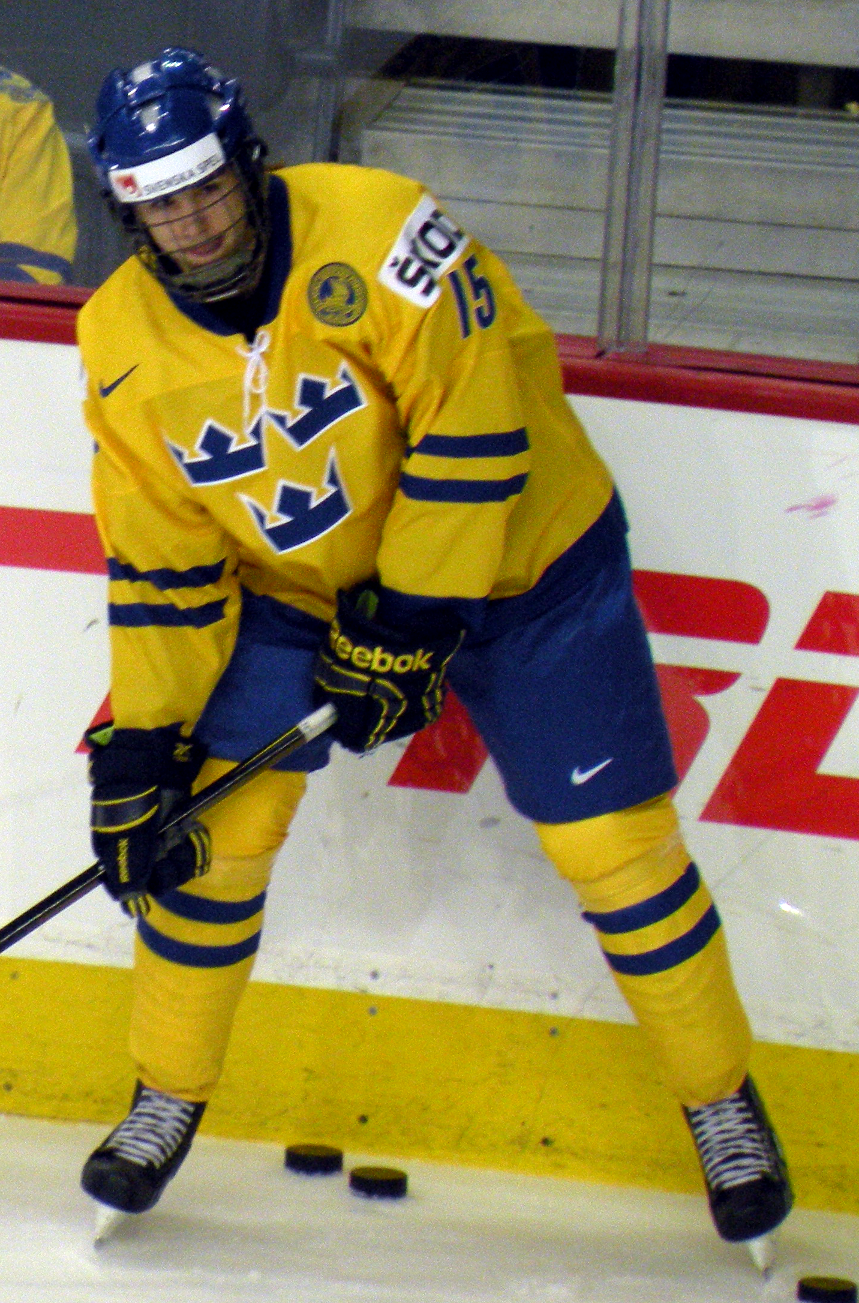
- Collberg prior to the gold medal game of the 2012 World Junior Hockey Championships

Medal record

Representing Sweden

Men's ice hockey

World Junior Championships
Gold medal – first place	2012 Calgary	
Silver medal – second place	2013 Ufa	
Silver medal – second place	2014 Malmö	

World U18 Championships
Silver medal – second place	2012 Brno	

Ivan Hlinka Memorial Tournament
Silver medal – second place	2011 Břeclav	

Collberg debuted for Sweden internationally with Sweden's under 16 national team during the 2009–10 season, leading all players with five goals and nine assist for a total of 14 points in eleven games. During the 2010–11 season Collberg played six games with the under 17 national team, leading all players in scoring with six goals and five assist for eleven points. Collberg also made five appearances with Sweden men's national under-18 ice hockey team, registering one assist. He was selected to represent Sweden at the 2011 IIHF World U18 Championships, but was injured in his hand during a pre-tournament friendly game against Canada, after having blocked a shot and he was unable to play in the tournament. He was on the team a few months later for the 2011 Ivan Hlinka Memorial Tournament, where Sweden made it to the final against Canada but lost 1–4, with Collberg assisting on Sweden's lone goal. Collberg lead team Sweden in scoring with three goals and four assist in five games, and tied for sixth overall in the tournament together with Aleksander Barkov.

Collberg together with Filip Forsberg were the only 1994-born players selected to Sweden men's national junior ice hockey team at the 2012 World Junior Ice Hockey Championships—a tournament primarily for player born 1992—where they formed a line together with centre Victor Rask. Collberg scored one goal and had two assists in Sweden's opening game against Latvia which ended in a 9–4 win for Sweden. In game two Collberg scored the game winning 4–3 goal in the shootout against Switzerland, and in game three against Slovakia Collberg scored two goals and had one assist. In the semifinal against Finland Collberg scored his second shootout goal in the tournament, followed by a goal by Max Friberg sending Sweden to the final with a 2–1 win in the shootout. Sweden won their first gold at the tournament in 31 years, their second overall, after a 1–0 overtime win against Russia in final. Collberg finished the tournament as Sweden's second best scorer, with four goals and three assist in six games.

Collberg was an alternate captain for Sweden at the 2012 IIHF World U18 Championships. Sweden won their group and were directly qualified for the semifinals where they faced Finland, Collberg scored two goals and one assist in a 7–3 win for Sweden en route to the final, where they lost 0–7 against USA. Collberg lead team Sweden in scoring with four goals and five assist in six game, which was tied fifth overall in the tournament together with Nic Kerdiles.

At the 2013 World Junior Ice Hockey Championships, Collberg had a three-game scoring streak to start the tournament, Sweden won their group and qualified for the semifinal where they faced hosting nation Russia. In the semifinal the score was 2–2 after regulation and overtime, in the shootout Collberg scored the game-winning goal against Andrei Vasilevskiy, sending Sweden to the final for the second year in a row. Sweden faced USA in the final, looking for revenge for their loss in the final at 2012 IIHF World U18 Championships, but were unable to beat the American team eventually losing 1–3. Collberg was Sweden's leading scorer for the tournament with four goals and two assist in six games.

Returning for his third World Junior Ice Hockey Championships at the 2014 tournament, Collberg only managed to score once in a 10–0 win against Norway, but his line together with Alexander Wennberg and Andreas Johnsson got praised as Sweden's best line in the tournament, and former junior national team head coach Roger Rönnberg praised Collberg as having done his best world juniors tournament. Sweden again reached the final where they faced Finland, Collberg assisted on the game tying 2–2 goal in the middle of the third period, but Sweden eventually lost in overtime. Collberg scored one goal and five assist in six games through the tournament.

In total, Collberg is Sweden's all-time leading scorer in international junior competition, with 43 goals and 53 assists for a total of 96 points in 81 games. Only four other players have played more games for Sweden's international junior teams.

== Career statistics ==
=== Regular season and playoffs ===
			Regular season					Playoffs
Season	Team	League	GP	G	A	Pts	PIM	GP	G	A	Pts	PIM
2007–08	Mariestad BoIS HC	SWE.3	—	—	—	—	—	1	0	0	0	0
2008–09	Mariestad BoIS HC	J18	16	8	8	16	4	—	—	—	—	—
2008–09	Mariestad BoIS HC	SWE.2 U20	21	4	4	8	10	—	—	—	—	—
2009–10	Mariestad BoIS HC	J18	15	12	15	27	8	—	—	—	—	—
2009–10	Mariestad BoIS HC	SWE.2 U20	24	24	14	38	12	2	1	0	1	4
2009–10	Mariestad BoIS HC	SWE.3	4	1	0	1	0	—	—	—	—	—
2010–11	Frölunda HC	J18	3	2	4	6	0	—	—	—	—	—
2010–11	Frölunda HC	J18 Allsv	5	7	3	10	0	4	1	1	2	0
2010–11	Frölunda HC	J20	35	21	23	44	12	7	4	5	9	0
2010–11	Frölunda HC	SEL	5	0	0	0	0	—	—	—	—	—
2011–12	Frölunda HC	J18 Allsv	1	1	1	2	0	4	3	3	6	4
2011–12	Frölunda HC	J20	21	9	8	17	18	2	0	0	0	0
2011–12	Frölunda HC	SEL	41	0	0	0	0	—	—	—	—	—
2012–13	Frölunda HC	J20	1	0	0	0	0	2	0	0	0	0
2012–13	Frölunda HC	SEL	35	6	3	9	6	5	0	2	2	0
2012–13	Örebro HK	Allsv	15	6	2	8	2	—	—	—	—	—
2012–13	Mariestad BoIS HC	SWE.3	1	1	1	2	0	—	—	—	—	—
2012–13	Hamilton Bulldogs	AHL	2	0	0	0	0	—	—	—	—	—
2013–14	Frölunda HC	J20	3	5	1	6	0	1	0	1	1	2
2013–14	Frölunda HC	SHL	40	3	6	9	8	1	0	0	0	0
2014–15	Bridgeport Sound Tigers	AHL	43	4	14	18	13	—	—	—	—	—
2014–15	Stockton Thunder	ECHL	6	4	3	7	0	—	—	—	—	—
2015–16	Bridgeport Sound Tigers	AHL	42	3	7	10	10	3	0	0	0	8
2016–17	Rögle BK	SHL	45	6	7	13	10	4	1	2	3	0
2017–18	Rögle BK	SHL	35	4	5	9	14	—	—	—	—	—
2018–19	Timrå IK	SHL	37	7	4	11	10	5	0	0	0	0
2019–20	Graz 99ers	EBEL	27	4	9	13	8	3	0	0	0	4
2020–21	Löwen Frankfurt	DEL2	39	13	22	35	12	5	4	1	5	2
2021–22	BIK Karlskoga	Allsv	21	2	5	7	6	8	0	5	5	0
2022–23	BIK Karlskoga	Allsv	1	1	1	2	0	—	—	—	—	—
SHL totals			238	26	25	51	50	6	0	2	2	0

=== International ===
Year	Team	Event	Result	GP	G	A	Pts	PIM
2011	Sweden	IH18	2nd place, silver medalist(s)	5	3	4	7	6
2012	Sweden	WJC	1st place, gold medalist(s)	6	4	3	7	0
2012	Sweden	U18	2nd place, silver medalist(s)	6	4	5	9	14
2013	Sweden	WJC	2nd place, silver medalist(s)	6	4	2	6	4
2014	Sweden	WJC	2nd place, silver medalist(s)	7	1	5	6	6
Junior totals				30	16	19	35	30
