= 2009 Nordic Trophy =

< 2008
2010 >

2009 Nordic Trophy included two tournaments:

- 2009 Nordic Trophy (Swedish tournament)
- 2009 Nordic Trophy (Finnish tournament)
