= European Trophy Junior =

- Formerly: Nordic Trophy (2007–2009)
- Sport: Ice hockey
- Founded: 2007
- Folded: 2010
- CEO: Bo Lennartsson
- Country: Austria; Czech Republic; Finland; Norway; Sweden
- Last champion: Frölunda HC
- Qualification: Invitation
- Related competitions: European Trophy
- Website: EuropeanTrophy.com

European Trophy Junior (previously named Nordic Trophy Junior between 2007 and 2009) was the junior edition of the European Trophy ice hockey tournament. European Trophy Junior was for ice hockey players younger than the age of 20. It was played in August every year. The tournament was cancelled after 2010.

== Participating clubs ==
The 2010 edition featured 10 teams from Sweden, Finland, Austria, Norway and the Czech Republic.

Division CCM
| Team | City |
|---|---|
| (Sweden) Färjestads BK | Karlstad |
| (Finland) HIFK | Helsinki |
| (Sweden) HV71 | Jönköping |
| (Sweden) Malmö Redhawks | Malmö |
| (Austria) Red Bull Salzburg | Salzburg |

Division Reebok
| Team | City |
|---|---|
| (Sweden) Djurgårdens IF | Stockholm |
| (Sweden) Frölunda HC | Gothenburg |
| (Sweden) Linköpings HC | Linköping |
| Norway Team 20 | Norway |
| (Czech Republic) Karlovy Vary | Karlovy Vary |

== Winners ==
Nordic Trophy
| Year | Regular round winners | Playoff winners (Nordic Trophy Champions) |
|---|---|---|
| 2007 | (Sweden) Djurgårdens IF (Group A) | (Sweden) Djurgårdens IF |
| 2007 | (Sweden) Frölunda HC (Group B) | (Sweden) Djurgårdens IF |
| 2008 | (Sweden) Djurgårdens IF (Group A) | (Sweden) Djurgårdens IF |
| 2008 | (Finland) Kärpät (Group B) | (Sweden) Djurgårdens IF |
| 2009 | (Sweden) Färjestads BK (Division CCM) | (Sweden) Färjestads BK |
| 2009 | (Sweden) Frölunda HC (Division Reebok) | (Sweden) Färjestads BK |
European Trophy
| Year | Regular round winners | Playoff winners (European Trophy Champions) |
| 2010 | (Sweden) Malmö Redhawks (Division CCM) | (Sweden) Frölunda HC |
| 2010 | (Sweden) Frölunda HC (Division Reebok) | (Sweden) Frölunda HC |

== See also ==
- European Trophy, the main tournament
