= 2009 Nordic Trophy Junior =

Youth ice hockey competition

The 2009 Nordic Trophy Junior was the third and last Nordic Trophy Junior ice hockey tournament, played between 20 August- and 23 August, 2009. This time, the tournament was held in Linköping, Sweden.

== Regulation round ==
Team is qualified for the final

=== Division CCM ===
==== Standings ====
Team	GP	W	OTW/SOW	OTL/SOL	L	GF	GA	DIF	PTS
(Sweden) Färjestads BK	3	3	0	0	0	20	7	+13	9
(Sweden) HV71	3	2	0	0	1	7	8	–1	6
(Finland) Tappara	3	1	0	0	2	8	16	–8	3
(Sweden) Linköpings HC	3	0	0	0	3	10	14	–4	0

==== Games ====
===== 20 August =====
- Färjestads BK – HV71 5 – 1 (2–0, 2–0, 1–1)
- Linköpings HC – Tappara 4 – 5 (0–1, 2–1, 2–3)

===== 21 August =====
- Färjestads BK – Tappara 8 – 1 (2–1, 3–0, 3–0)
- Linköpings HC – HV71 1 – 2 (0–0, 1–2, 0–0)

===== 22 August =====
- Linköpings HC – Färjestads BK 5 – 7 (2–1, 1–3, 2–3)
- Tappara – HV71 2 – 4 (0–0, 2–2, 0–2)

=== Division Reebok ===
==== Standings ====
Team	GP	W	OTW/SOW	OTL/SOL	L	GF	GA	DIF	PTS
(Sweden) Frölunda HC	3	3	0	0	0	17	4	+13	9
(Sweden) Djurgårdens IF	3	1	0	1	1	14	13	+1	4
(Sweden) Malmö Redhawks	3	1	0	0	2	10	15	–5	3
(Finland) Kärpät	3	0	1	0	2	8	17	–9	2

==== Games ====
===== 20 August =====
- Kärpät – Djurgårdens IF 4 – 3 GWS (1–1, 2–1, 0–1, 0–0, 1–0)
- Malmö Redhawks – Frölunda HC 0 – 4 (0–1, 0–3, 0–0)

===== 21 August =====
- Frölunda HC – Djurgårdens IF 7 – 4 (2–2, 3–2, 2–0)
- Malmö Redhawks – Kärpät 8 – 4 (1–1, 3–1, 4–2)

===== 22 August =====
- Kärpät – Frölunda HC 0 – 6 (0–1, 0–5, 0–0)
- Malmö Redhawks – Djurgårdens IF 2 – 7 (0–1, 1–5, 1–1)

== Playoffs ==
=== Games ===
==== 23 August ====
- Place 7–8: Kärpät – Linköpings HC 2 – 4 (0–2, 0–0, 2–2)
- Place 5–6: Malmö Redhawks – Tappara 5 – 2 (1–2, 3–0, 1–0)
- Bronze medal game: HV71 – Djurgårdens IF 4 – 3 (0–1, 1–2, 3–0)
- Final: Färjestads BK – Frölunda HC 2 – 1 (1–0, 1–0, 0–1)

== Final standings ==
Gold medal	(Sweden) Färjestads BK
Silver medal	(Sweden) Frölunda HC
Bronze medal	(Sweden) HV71
4	(Sweden) Djurgårdens IF
5	(Sweden) Malmö Redhawks
6	(Finland) Tappara
7	(Sweden) Linköpings HC
8	(Finland) Kärpät

== See also ==
- 2009 Nordic Trophy (disambiguation)
