= 2006 Nordic Trophy =

Ice hockey competition

2007 >

The 2006 Nordic Trophy was the first edition of the Nordic Trophy ice hockey tournament. Eight teams, four from Finland and Sweden apiece, played seven games, and the top two teams qualified for the final. Färjestad BK defeated Oulun Kärpät in the final.

== First round ==
	Club	GP	W	OTW	OTL	L	GF–GA	Pts
1.	(Sweden) Färjestad BK	7	5	1	0	1	31:21	12
2.	(Finland) Oulun Kärpät	7	4	1	1	1	32:16	11
3.	(Sweden) Djurgårdens IF Hockey	7	4	1	1	1	27:24	11
4.	(Sweden) Linköpings HC	7	3	0	1	3	19:20	7
5.	(Finland) HC TPS	7	3	0	0	4	24:27	6
6.	(Finland) Tappara	7	1	1	2	3	21:24	6
7.	(Sweden) Frölunda HC	7	2	1	0	4	22:30	6
8.	(Finland) HIFK	7	0	1	1	5	13:27	3

== Final ==
(Sweden) Färjestad BK	–	(Finland) Oulun Kärpät	5:1 (2:0, 1:0, 2:1)
