= Victor Romfors =

Swedish ice hockey player

- Born: January 26, 1994 (age 31); Sweden
- Height: 5 ft 10 in (178 cm)
- Weight: 170 lb (77 kg; 12 st 2 lb)
- Position: Forward
- Shoots: Right
- SHL team: HV71
- NHL draft: Undrafted
- Playing career: 2014–present

Victor Romfors (born January 26, 1994) is a Swedish ice hockey player. He is currently playing with HV71 of the Swedish Hockey League (SHL).

Romfors made his first appearance with HV71 during the 2013–14 European Trophy. On February 8, 2104, Romfors made his Swedish Hockey League regular season debut, playing with HV71 during the 2013–14 SHL season.
