= 2014–15 Oulun Kärpät season =

2014–15 Oulun Kärpät
- 2014–15 record: 2–0–0–2
- Home record: 1–0–0–1
- Road record: 1–0–0–1
- Goals for: 10
- Goals against: 10

Team information
- Coach: Lauri Marjamäki
- Captain: Lasse Kukkonen
- Alternate captains: Ivan Huml; Mika Pyörälä
- Arena: Oulun Energia Areena
- Average attendance: 5 310

Team leaders
- Goals: Junttila (3)
- Assists: five players (2)
- Points: Junttila; Haataja (4)
- Penalty minutes: Deschamps (18min)
- Wins: Karhunen; Tarkki (1)
- Goals against average: Karhunen (2,50)

2014–15 Oulun Kärpät season is the 30th season for Oulun Kärpät in Finnish Liiga.

== Standings ==
Top six advanced straight to quarter-finals, while teams between 7th and 10th positions played wild card round for the final two spots. The Liiga is a closed series and thus there is no relegation.

Team	GP	W	OTW	OTL	L	GF	GA	+/−	P
HIFK	3	3	0	0	0	14	4	+10	9
Ässät	3	2	1	0	0	9	3	+6	8
KalPa	3	1	2	0	0	10	5	+5	7
Ilves	3	2	0	0	1	9	4	+4	6
JYP	3	2	0	0	1	9	8	+1	6
Kärpät	4	2	0	0	2	10	10	0	6
Tappara	3	1	0	1	1	4	6	-2	4
SaiPa	2	1	0	0	1	6	6	0	3
Blues	3	1	0	0	2	5	6	-1	3
Sport	3	1	0	0	2	7	12	-5	3
TPS	3	1	0	0	2	6	11	-5	3
Pelicans	3	0	1	0	2	5	7	-2	2
Lukko	3	0	0	2	1	5	10	-5	2
HPK	3	0	0	1	2	7	14	-7	1

== Schedule and results ==
2014–15 Game Log

September: 2–0–0–2 (Home: 1–0–0–1; Road: 1–0–0–1)
#	Date	Home	Score	Visitor	OT	Decision	Attendance	Record	Pts	Recap
1	September 10	Kärpät	3–1	Tappara		Karhunen	5 608	1–0–0–0	3	Recap
2	September 12	TPS	2–5	Kärpät		Tarkki	10 362	2–0–0–0	6	Recap
3	September 14	Kärpät	1–4	HIFK		Karhunen	5 012	2–0–0–1	6	Recap
4	September 16	Ilves	3–1	Kärpät		Tarkki	4 371	2–0–0–2	6	Recap
5	September 17	HPK	–	Kärpät
6	September 20	Kärpät	–	Blues
7	September 27	Sport	–	Kärpät
8	September 30	Kärpät	–	HIFK

October: 0–0–0–0 (Home: 0–0–0–0; Road: 0–0–0–0)
#	Date	Home	Score	Visitor	OT	Decision	Attendance	Record	Pts	Recap
9	October 3	Lukko	–	Kärpät
10	October 4	Ässät	–	Kärpät
11	October 10	Kärpät	–	KalPa
12	October 11	KalPa	–	Kärpät
13	October 14	Kärpät	–	TPS
14	October 15	Kärpät	–	Lukko
15	October 17	Tappara	–	Kärpät
16	October 18	Pelicans	–	Kärpät
17	October 21	Kärpät	–	Ilves
18	October 24	Kärpät	–	Ässät
19	October 25	JYP	–	Kärpät
20	October 28	Kärpät	–	Sport

November: 0–0–0–0 (Home: 0–0–0–0; Road: 0–0–0–0)
#	Date	Home	Score	Visitor	OT	Decision	Attendance	Record	Pts	Recap
21	November 1	Kärpät	–	SaiPa
22	November 13	Blues	–	Kärpät
23	November 18	Ässät	–	Kärpät
24	November 22	Kärpät	–	JYP
25	November 25	Blues	–	Kärpät
26	November 27	Kärpät	–	HPK
27	November 29	Kärpät	–	Pelicans

December: 0–0–0–0 (Home: 0–0–0–0; Road: 0–0–0–0)
#	Date	Home	Score	Visitor	OT	Decision	Attendance	Record	Pts	Recap
28	December 5	KalPa	–	Kärpät
29	December 9	SaiPa	–	Kärpät
30	December 11	HIFK	–	Kärpät
31	December 13	Kärpät	–	Sport
32	December 27	Kärpät	–	KalPa
33	December 30	Kärpät	–	Blues

January: 0–0–0–0 (Home: 0–0–0–0; Road: 0–0–0–0)
#	Date	Home	Score	Visitor	OT	Decision	Attendance	Record	Pts	Recap
34	January 2	Sport	–	Kärpät
35	January 5	Ilves	–	Kärpät
36	January 7	Kärpät	–	Pelicans
37	January 9	HPK	–	Kärpät
38	January 10	Kärpät	–	TPS
39	January 13	Ässät	–	Kärpät
40	January 15	Lukko	–	Kärpät
41	January 17	Kärpät	–	TPS
42	January 20	Blues	–	Kärpät
43	OPEN	Tasauskierros
44	OPEN	Tasauskierros
45	January 27	Kärpät	–	Ilves
46	January 30	Kärpät	–	Sport

February: 0–0–0–0 (Home: 0–0–0–0; Road: 0–0–0–0)
#	Date	Home	Score	Visitor	OT	Decision	Attendance	Record	Pts	Recap
47	February 10	Kärpät	–	Lukko
48	February 13	Kärpät	–	Tappara
49	February 14	JYP	–	Kärpät
50	February 17	HIFK	–	Kärpät
51	February 19	SaiPa	–	Kärpät
52	February 21	Kärpät	–	HPK
53	February 24	TPS	–	Kärpät
54	February 26	Lukko	–	Kärpät
55	February 28	Kärpät	–	Ässät

March: 0–0–0–0 (Home: 0–0–0–0; Road: 0–0–0–0)
#	Date	Home	Score	Visitor	OT	Decision	Attendance	Record	Pts	Recap
56	March 3	Kärpät	–	SaiPa
57	March 5	Tappara	–	Kärpät
58	March 7	Kärpät	–	HIFK
59	March 10	Pelicans	–	Kärpät
60	March 12	Kärpät	–	JYP

Selitykset: Win (3 points) Overtime win (2 points) Overtime loss (1 point) Loss (0 points)
