= 2009 Nordic Trophy (Swedish tournament) =

Ice hockey competition

The 2009 Nordic Trophy (Swedish tournament) was the Swedish edition of the 2009 Nordic Trophy ice hockey tournament, played between August 7 and August 29, 2009. The final weekend was played in Mariehamn, Åland Islands, Finland, at the Islandia.

This year, the Finnish teams dropped out and formed their own Finnish edition of the 2009 Nordic Trophy. Djurgårdens IF defeated defending champions Linköpings HC in the final with a score of 4–1. Andreas Engqvist, Djurgården became the best player of the tournament while Jacob Josefson, also Djurgården, scored most points.

== Group stage ==
The group stage matches were played at different small town venues in Sweden. HV71 clinched the first place for the first time since the tournament's inauguration.

Nordic Trophy	GP	W	L	T	OTW	OTL	PSW	PSL	GF	GA	Pts
y-HV71	5	4	1	0	0	0	0	0	20	9	12
y-Frölunda HC	5	3	2	0	0	0	0	0	17	14	9
y-Djurgårdens IF	5	2	2	1	0	1	0	0	13	11	7
y-Linköpings HC	5	1	2	2	1	0	0	1	12	13	6
x-Färjestads BK	5	2	3	0	0	0	0	0	9	14	6
x-Malmö Redhawks	5	1	3	1	0	0	1	0	9	19	5

y - clinched semi-final spot for championship, x - play for 5th place

== Playoffs ==
The 2009 Nordic Trophy playoffs were played from August 28 to August 30 in Mariehamn, Åland Islands, Finland, at the Islandia. The four best teams from the group stage played in the semi-finals and final, and the two lowest ranked teams played in the fifth-placed game.

=== Playoff bracket ===
Semifinals
2	Frölunda HC	0
3	Djurgårdens IF	3
1	HV71	1
4	Linköpings HC	3

Finals
3	Djurgårdens IF	4
4	Linköpings HC	1
Third place
1	HV71	5
2	Frölunda HC	1

Fifth-place
5	Färjestads BK	1
6	Malmö Redhawks	3

== Final standings ==
Gold medal	(Sweden) Djurgårdens IF
Silver medal	(Sweden) Linköpings HC
Bronze medal	(Sweden) HV71
4	(Sweden) Frölunda HC
5	(Sweden) Malmö Redhawks
6	(Sweden) Färjestads BK

== Statistics ==
No	Pos	Player	Team	GP	G	A	Pts
1	F	(Sweden) Jacob Josefson	Djurgårdens IF	7	5	4	9
2	D	(Sweden) Magnus Johansson	Linköpings HC	7	3	5	8
3	D	(Finland) Pasi Puistola	HV71	7	1	7	8
4	F	(Sweden) Björn Melin	HV71	7	4	2	6
5	F	(Sweden) Patrik Zackrisson	Linköpings HC	6	3	3	6
