= Jacob Josefson =

Swedish ice hockey player (born 1991)

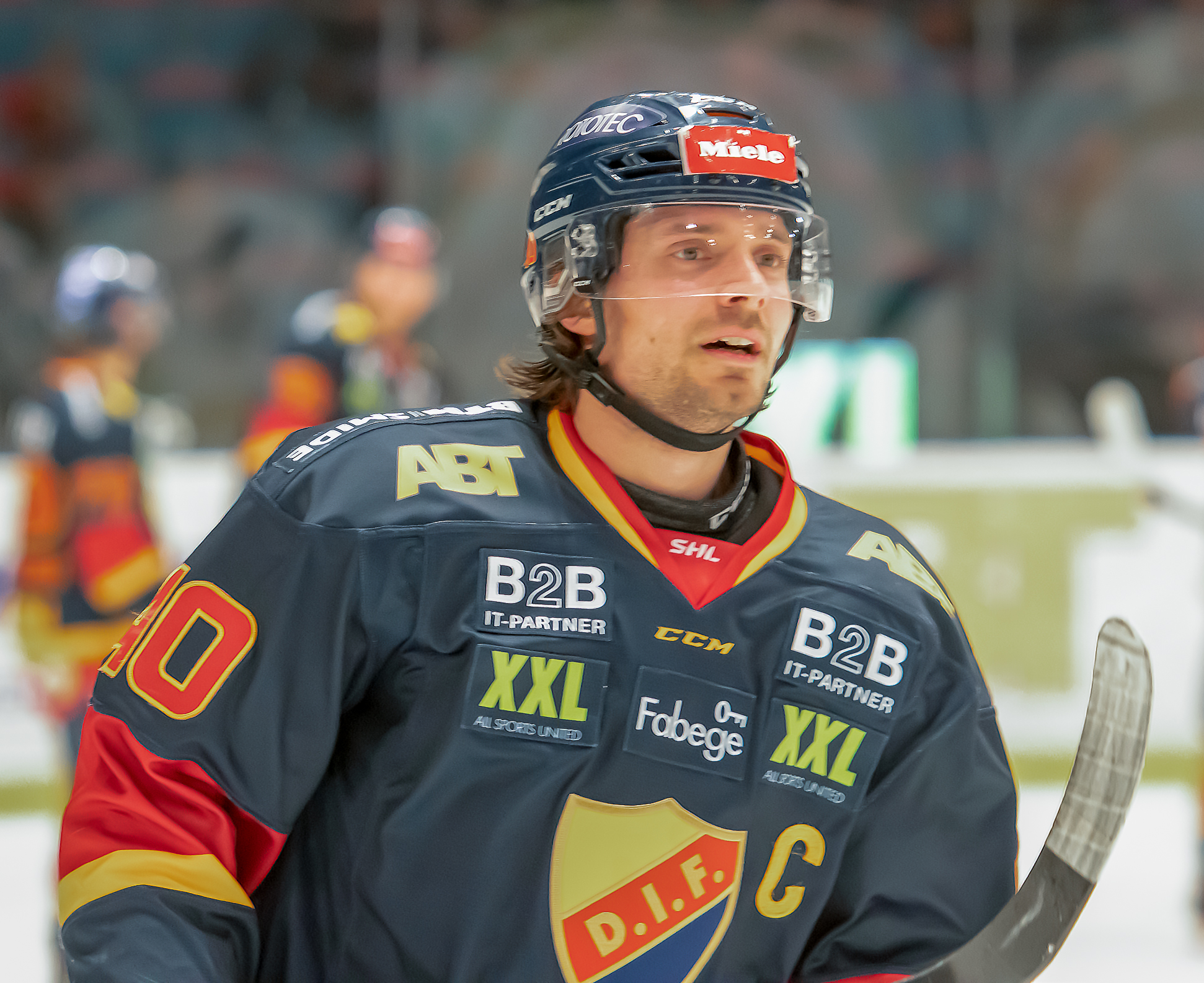
- Josefson with Djurgårdens IF in 2019
- Born: 2 March 1991 (age 35) Stockholm, Sweden
- Height: 6 ft 1 in (185 cm)
- Weight: 190 lb (86 kg; 13 st 8 lb)
- Position: Centre
- Shot: Left
- SHL team Former teams: Djurgårdens IF; New Jersey Devils; Buffalo Sabres
- National team: Sweden
- NHL draft: 20th overall, 2009; New Jersey Devils
- Playing career: 2007–2022

Jacob Peter Josefson (born 2 March 1991) is a Swedish professional ice hockey player. A centre, he currently plays for Djurgårdens IF of the Swedish Hockey League (SHL). After Josefson began playing hockey at the age of five, he was acquired by Djurgården's youth organization at the age of ten, where he also began playing junior hockey in 2005. Josefson made his Elitserien debut on 28 February 2008, against Timrå IK, and became a regular member of Djurgården's senior team. His achievements in the Swedish Elitserien drew attention from NHL and he was selected in the first round of the 2009 NHL entry draft by the New Jersey Devils, 20th overall. Josefson played with Djurgården for an additional season, before signing with the Devils in May 2010 and played for them until 2017 when he left for the Buffalo Sabres. He returned to Djurgården in 2018 and played three seasons before being forced to retire due to injuries. In 2025, Josefson made a comeback to professional hockey playing once again with Djurgården.

Josefson has represented Sweden at four International Ice Hockey Federation (IIHF) sanctioned junior events, winning the silver medal at the 2009 World Junior Ice Hockey Championships and the bronze medal at the 2010 World Junior Ice Hockey Championships. He also participated in the 2008 IIHF World U18 Championships, but only played three of Sweden's six games, and the 2009 IIHF World U18 Championships.

== Early life ==
Josefson was born on 2 March 1991, in Stockholm, Sweden, to Annika and Peter Josefson. He is the youngest of three brothers. At the age of two, Josefson began skating and joined IK Göta at the age of five. His older brothers had played for the same club. He played with Hammarby IF for a year before he was acquired by Djurgårdens IF at the age of ten, playing for the 1991 team. He also played football until the age of 13, before deciding to focus entirely on hockey. Josefson attended high school at Vittra Gymnasium in Sweden while playing for Djurgården.

== Playing career ==
=== Djurgårdens IF ===
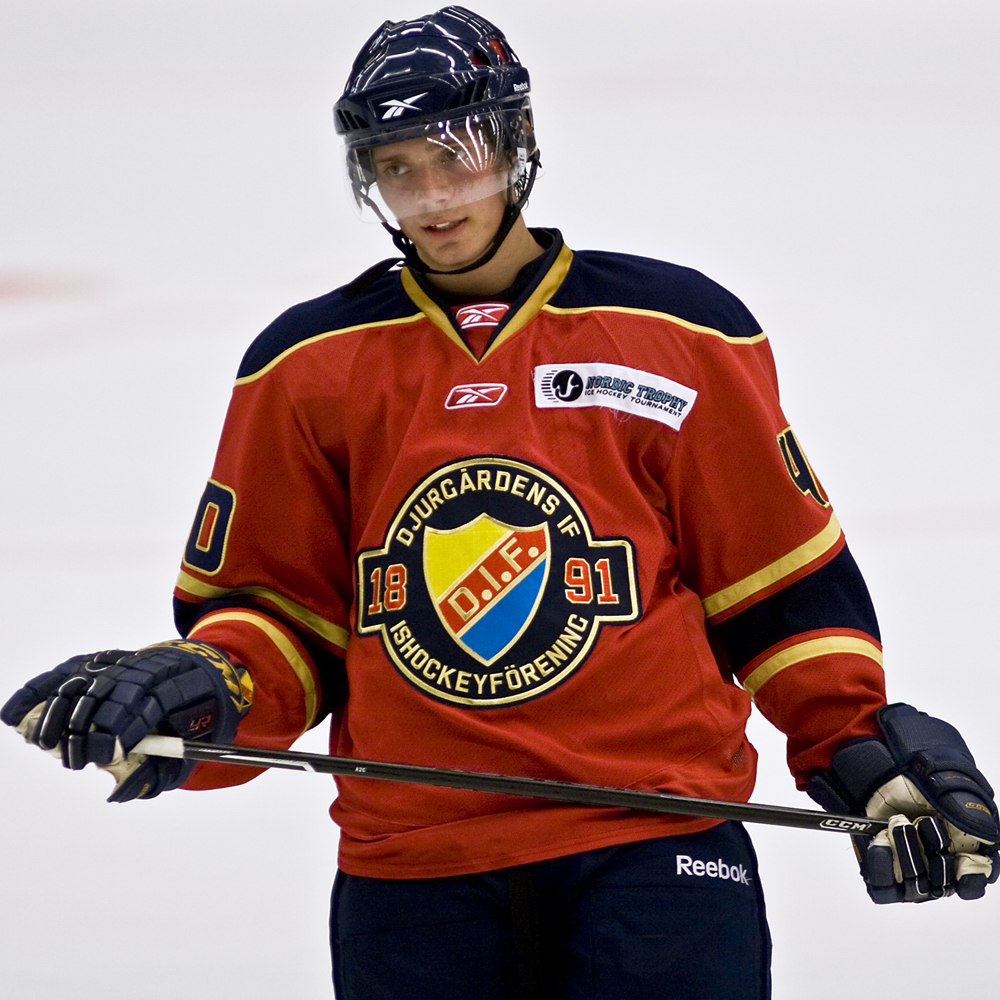
Josefson in 2009

Josefson started to play junior hockey in 2005 for Djurgården's under-18 team. During the 2006–07 season, he helped Djurgården's under-16 team to win the Swedish championship. The 2007–08 season began with the national junior hockey tournament TV-pucken. Josefson's team Stockholm/Vit reached the final which ended with a 2–1 defeat to Småland. He made his Elitserien debut on 28 February 2008, against Timrå IK. This proved to be the only appearance Josefson would make in the Elitserien during the 2007–08 season. Josefson played for the J20-team during most of the season scoring 14 goals and 31 points. His team reached the playoffs, but were defeated by Brynäs IF in the semi-finals. After the loss, he joined the under-18 team during the playoffs where he helped the team defeat Färjestads BK to capture the Swedish championship.

He signed a two-year contract with Djurgården in May 2008. The club's initial plan for Josefson was to move him up to the senior team when regular players were out of the lineup with illness or injuries, while his usual team would be the J20-team. He scored his first goal in Elitserien on 23 September in his third game, a 4–1 win against Brynäs IF. Ultimately, Josefson played almost every game of the regular season, and usually played along with Carl Gustafsson and Henrik Eriksson on the 4th line. At the end of the season, Josefson had scored 5 goals and 16 points, a record for players 18 or younger playing with the senior team. Josefson was ranked third in the midterm rankings among European skaters by the NHL Central Scouting Bureau for the 2009 NHL entry draft. He was selected in the first round of the 2009 NHL draft by the New Jersey Devils, 20th overall. Josefson was also drafted in the third round, 61st overall, in the 2009 KHL Junior Draft by SKA Saint Petersburg. He participated at the Devils rookie camp in July 2009. He has been compared with centres Nicklas Bäckström and John Madden.

At the beginning of the 2009–10 season, Djurgården participated in the Nordic Trophy pre-season tournament. In the second game, Josefson scored a hat trick and added two assists against the Malmö Redhawks. At the end of the group stage, Josefson was the scoring leader with five goals and seven points. He scored his first points for the regular season, three assists, in the Elitserien premiere away against HV71. Djurgården lost the game 7–6, but on 20 October, Josefson would get his revenge when he scored the game-winning goal in the 3–2 victory over HV71 20. This was also his first goal of the regular season. Josefson missed six Elitserien games due to the World Junior Hockey Championship, but was back in the roster against Timrå IK on 9 January. He recorded an assist against Rögle BK on 30 January, which was his 17th point of the season, putting him ahead of last season's total. At the end of the regular season, Josefson had scored 8 goals and 20 points in 43 games. The 2009–10 playoffs were Josefson's first Elitserien playoffs, and he played almost every game missing the first two semifinal games against Linköpings HC due to illness. Djurgården lost the finals 4–2 to HV71. Josefson re-signed with Djurgården for another year on 27 April. Despite this and an oral guarantee the club received from Josefson's agent Peter Wallén that Josefson would stay, Josefson signed with the New Jersey Devils on 14 May 2010.

=== New Jersey Devils ===
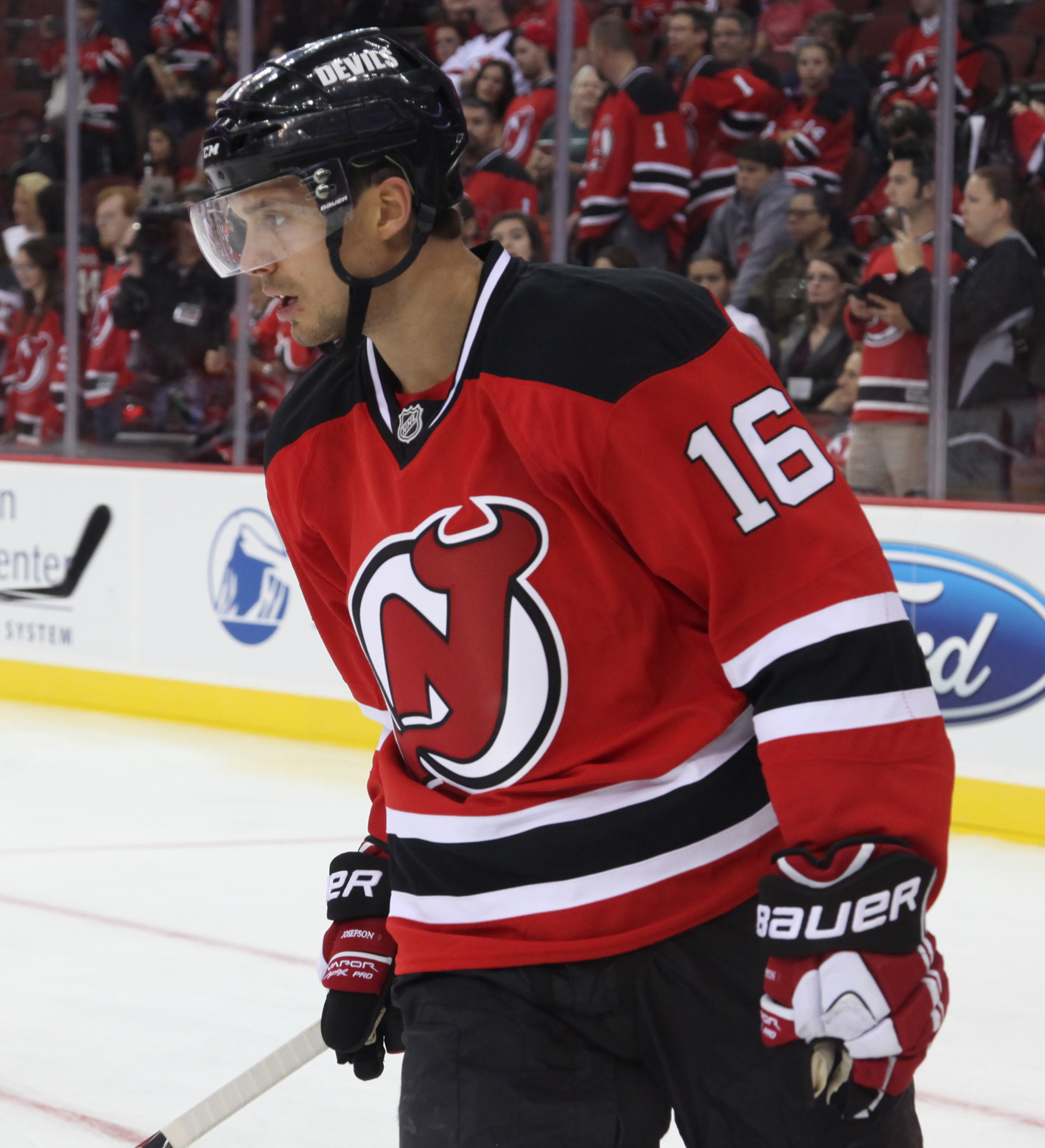
Josefson with the New Jersey Devils in September 2014

Josefson participated in the pre-season camp with the Devils in September, but was assigned to their American Hockey League (AHL) affiliate, the Albany Devils after the camp. Josefson was called up to the Devils on 14 October 2010, and made his NHL debut the next day, in a 3–2 victory against Colorado Avalanche at the Prudential Center. Josefson was slashed on his left hand and later fell on the same hand during the game against San Jose Sharks on 27 October, this caused a ligament in his thumb to tear, and forced him to undergo surgery. At last, Josefson returned from his injury on 7 January 2011, when the Albany Devils played against the Charlotte Checkers. Josefson scored his first NHL goal against Al Montoya of the New York Islanders on 12 March 2011. The Devils failed to reach the playoffs and Josefson ended up with three goals and ten points in 28 regular season games.

In the fifth game of the 2011–12 season, Josefson broke his right clavicle after crashing shoulder first into the boards. He underwent surgery the following day on 22 October 2011, and was expected to be sidelined for three or four months. On 3 April 2012 in a game against the Islanders, Josefson bumped awkwardly into Jay Pandolfo resulting in a broken left wrist. He returned to the lineup on 21 May 2012 in the fourth game of the Eastern Conference Finals against Rangers and played a total of six games in the 2012 Stanley Cup playoffs, scoring one point.

=== Buffalo Sabres ===
After seven seasons within the Devils organization, Josefson left as a free agent and signed a one-year, $700,000 contract with the Buffalo Sabres on 1 July 2017. In the 2017–18 season, Josefson was limited to just 39 games through various injuries to contribute with just 2 goals and 4 points for the bottom placed Sabres.

=== Return to Djurgården ===
Having played 8 successive seasons in the NHL amassing 315 games, Josefson as an impending free agent from the Sabres opted to return to his original club in Sweden, Djurgårdens IF, agreeing to a multi-year contract through 2022 on 27 April 2018. While struggling for the puck against Frölunda player Joel Lundqvist on 15 November, Josefson was cut by Lundqvist's skate which tore his urethra. Josefson missed 8 games due to his injury and he returned to play in a home game on 26 December against HV71. Josefson ended the 2018–19 season regular season with 12 goals and 35 points. He played in 15 of 19 playoff games, with Djurgården facing Frölunda in the finals and ultimately lost in six games. He was awarded the Guldhjälmen as the most valuable player as decided by the players in the league.

Josefson suffered a foot injury early October 2019 kept him out of play for three months in the 2019–20 SHL season and only played 30 of the 52 regular season games, scoring 5 goals and 16 points.

After several concussions, the last one occurring during a game against Rögle BK on 20 January 2021, Josefson was forced into rehabilitation in the spring of 2021. Having successfully gone through the rehabilitation Josefson recovered in time for the pre-season in the summer of 2021. During a pre-season game against Linköping HC the symptoms returned. A prolonged absence from ice hockey was announced and Josefson ultimately missed the entirety of the 2021–22 SHL season. At the end of the season, he announced his retirement from professional ice hockey. Four years after his last game, Josefson returned to professional hockey on 22 August 2025 in a pre-season game against Almtuna IS. He scored his first SHL goal since his comeback on 27 September against Timrå IK, which also was his first SHL goal since 16 January 2021.

== International play ==
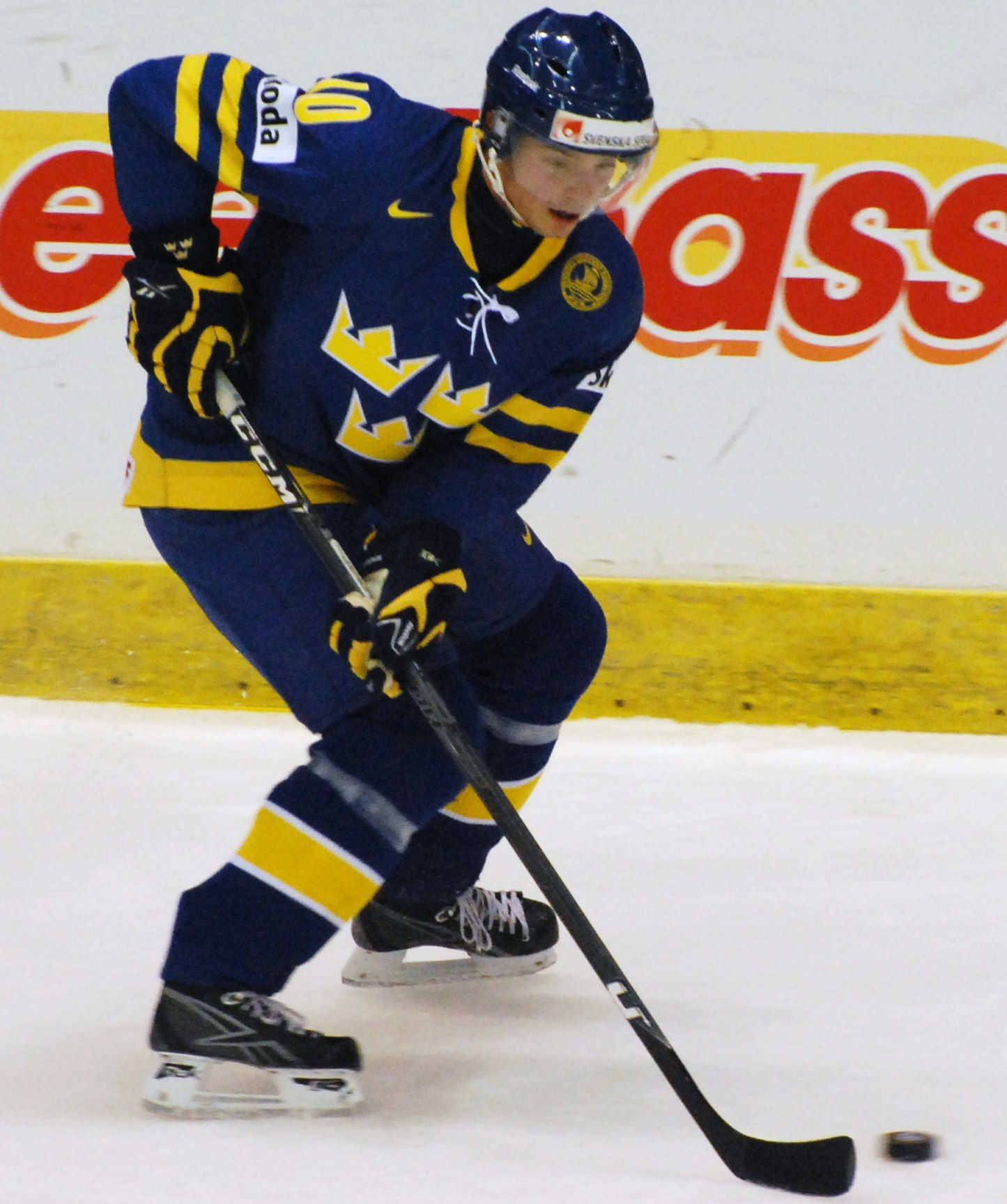

Medal record

Representing Sweden

Ice hockey

World Junior Championships
Silver medal – second place	2009 Canada	
Bronze medal – third place	2010 Canada	

Josefson played in his first IIHF sanctioned tournament when he was part of Sweden's team at the 2008 IIHF World U18 Championships. He managed to score a hat-trick in the first game against Belarus. He left the team in the morning before the fourth game due to an accident in which his father and uncle had been exposed to carbon monoxide poisoning. He made his second appearance at the U18 Championship the following year, at the 2009 IIHF World U18 Championships, where he also took the role as alternate captain. He managed to score three goals and seven points in six games. Josefson was a part of Sweden's national junior team at the 2009 World Junior Championships. He played in all of Sweden's six games but did not score any points. A few months later he yet again played for Sweden in the U18 Championship but could not help his team go further than fifth place in the tournament.

Josefson participated in the World Junior Championship for the second time when he was named for Team Sweden by head coach Pär Mårts for the 2010 World Junior Championships, along with fellow Djurgården teammates Daniel Brodin and Marcus Krüger. He scored his first goal of the tournament and the first goal of the game against Austria in the preliminary rounds. He scored two additional goals in Sweden's 7–1 victory over Finland in the last game of the preliminary rounds. Josefson, who also had three assists in the tournament, had six points in total.

Josefson was named in the roster for the 2019 Karjala Tournament and played two games with no points scored.

== Career statistics ==
=== Regular season and playoffs ===
			Regular season					Playoffs
Season	Team	League	GP	G	A	Pts	PIM	GP	G	A	Pts	PIM
2005–06	Djurgårdens IF	J18	1	0	1	1	0	—	—	—	—	—
2005–06	Djurgårdens IF	J18 Allsv	4	1	0	1	0	—	—	—	—	—
2006–07	Djurgårdens IF	J18	14	10	12	22	20	—	—	—	—	—
2006–07	Djurgårdens IF	J18 Allsv	11	4	5	9	2	3	0	0	0	0
2007–08	Djurgårdens IF	J18	3	1	1	2	0	—	—	—	—	—
2007–08	Djurgårdens IF	J18 Allsv	1	0	1	1	12	6	0	6	6	4
2007–08	Djurgårdens IF	J20	34	14	17	31	22	7	2	3	5	8
2007–08	Djurgårdens IF	SEL	1	0	0	0	0	—	—	—	—	—
2008–09	Djurgårdens IF	J18 Allsv	—	—	—	—	—	1	0	0	0	0
2008–09	Djurgårdens IF	J20	3	0	1	1	6	6	1	3	4	4
2008–09	Djurgårdens IF	SEL	50	5	11	16	14	—	—	—	—	—
2009–10	Djurgårdens IF	SEL	43	8	12	20	20	14	3	2	5	4
2010–11	Albany Devils	AHL	18	3	9	12	4	—	—	—	—	—
2010–11	New Jersey Devils	NHL	28	3	7	10	6	—	—	—	—	—
2011–12	New Jersey Devils	NHL	41	2	7	9	6	6	0	1	1	0
2011–12	Albany Devils	AHL	4	2	1	3	2	—	—	—	—	—
2012–13	Albany Devils	AHL	38	10	15	25	29	—	—	—	—	—
2012–13	New Jersey Devils	NHL	22	1	2	3	2	—	—	—	—	—
2013–14	New Jersey Devils	NHL	27	1	2	3	4	—	—	—	—	—
2014–15	New Jersey Devils	NHL	62	6	5	11	24	—	—	—	—	—
2015–16	New Jersey Devils	NHL	58	4	10	14	20	—	—	—	—	—
2016–17	New Jersey Devils	NHL	38	1	9	10	16	—	—	—	—	—
2017–18	Buffalo Sabres	NHL	39	2	2	4	6	—	—	—	—	—
2018–19	Djurgårdens IF	SHL	40	12	23	35	32	15	1	6	7	6
2019–20	Djurgårdens IF	SHL	30	5	11	16	6	—	—	—	—	—
2020–21	Djurgårdens IF	SHL	27	7	7	14	24	—	—	—	—	—
SHL totals			191	37	64	101	96	29	4	8	12	10
NHL totals			315	20	44	64	84	6	0	1	1	0

=== International ===
Year	Team	Event	Result	GP	G	A	Pts	PIM
2008	Sweden	WJC18	4th	3	4	1	5	0
2009	Sweden	WJC	2nd place, silver medalist(s)	6	0	0	0	2
2009	Sweden	WJC18	5th	6	3	4	7	2
2010	Sweden	WJC	3rd place, bronze medalist(s)	6	3	3	6	4
2015	Sweden	WC	5th	8	2	2	4	2
Junior totals				21	10	8	18	26
Senior totals				8	2	2	4	2

Awards and achievements
Preceded by Mattias Tedenby	New Jersey Devils first-round draft pick 2009	Succeeded by Adam Larsson
