= European Trophy =

Ice hockey tournament

- Official European Trophy logo
- Formerly: Nordic Trophy (2006–2009)
- Sport: Ice hockey
- Founded: 2006
- First season: 2006
- Folded: 2013 (turned into Champions Hockey League)
- Director: Bo Lennartsson
- No. of teams: 32
- Country: Austria (2 teams); Czech Republic (7 teams); Finland (7 teams); Germany (4 teams); Slovakia (1 team); Sweden (7 teams); Switzerland (4 teams)
- Last champion: (Finland) JYP
- Qualification: Invitation
- Related competitions: European Trophy Junior (defunct)

European Trophy (previously named Nordic Trophy between 2006 and 2009) was an annually held ice hockey tournament, traditionally composed of teams from the higher-level ice hockey leagues in countries across Europe. With 32 participating teams from seven countries in 2013, the European Trophy was at the time the biggest active ice hockey tournament in Europe. Starting with the 2014–15 season, the European Trophy was replaced by the Champions Hockey League, a more formal competition which also included all of the champions of Europe's major national leagues.

Sweden and Finland always participated, and they were the only two countries participating when the tournament was named "Nordic Trophy". The tournament began in 2006 under the name "Nordic Trophy" with eight teams, four from Sweden and four from Finland. In 2010, several teams from European countries outside Scandinavia agreed to join the tournament, which changed its name to European Trophy as a result. By the 2013 tournament, eight countries had been represented: Sweden, Finland, Austria, Czech Republic, Germany, Slovakia, Switzerland, and Norway. No team ever won the tournament more than one time.

== Teams ==
In 2006 and 2007, the Nordic Trophy consisted of four Swedish teams, Djurgården, Frölunda, Färjestad and Linköping; as well as four Finnish teams, HIFK, Oulun Kärpät, Tappara and TPS.

In 2007, the tournament expanded from six to eight teams. A Junior edition was also started, but it was discontinued after 2010. In 2008, the senior tournament was expanded with two teams, Swedish team HV71 and Finnish team Jokerit. It got expanded again in 2009, when Malmö Redhawks from Sweden and Lukko from Finland joined the tournament. However, the Swedish and Finnish teams were split that year and instead, there were two tournaments: a Swedish 2009 Nordic Trophy for the Swedish teams; and a Finnish 2009 Nordic Trophy for the Finnish teams.

In 2010, the tournament expanded to European countries beyond Scandinavia. Lukko from Finland left, and was replaced by fellow Nordic team Vålerenga from Norway. Adler Mannheim and Eisbären Berlin from Germany, and Czech team Sparta Praha, completed the Capital Division; while Austrian team Red Bull Salzburg, along with SC Bern and ZSC Lions from Switzerland, completed the Central Division. These new teams prompted the changing of the tournament name to European Trophy.

In the 2011 tournament, there were 24 teams. Sweden and Finland were represented by six teams each. Luleå HF replaced the Swedish team Malmö Redhawks. From Finland, KalPa was for the first time included in the tournament. Seven teams from the Czech Republic participated: Slavia Praha, Sparta Praha, Mountfield České Budějovice, Bílí Tygři Liberec, ČSOB Pojišťovna Pardubice, Plzeň 1929, and Kometa Brno. The German teams Eisbären Berlin and Adler Mannheim remained in the tournament. Besides Red Bull Salzburg, there was now a second team from Austria, the Vienna Capitals. Slovakia was for the first time represented in the European Trophy tournament, with Slovan Bratislava. Norway and Switzerland, however, were no longer represented. The tournament's schedule was also changed; instead of having the playoffs in September right after the regulation round in August–September, the playoffs were now played in December.

The 2012 edition of the tournament is expanded further by eight teams, for a total of 32 teams. Another Swedish team, Brynäs IF joins the tournament this year; Switzerland returns with four teams; another two German teams participate; and another team from Finland joins the tournament. The regulation round is played in July–November, while the playoffs were played in December. Slavia Praha, however, announced on 31 May 2012 that they would be pulling out of the European Trophy. On 18 June it was announced that Piráti Chomutov had taken over Slavia Praha's spot in the South Division.

On 14 February 2013, the 2013 tournament was officially announced. It featured exactly the same 32 teams from last year, marking the first time in Nordic/European Trophy history that the teams remained the same from last year. The 32 teams were also divided into exactly the same divisions, and the regulation round schedule (before the playoffs) was similar to last year, the only difference being that the home–away team assignments for each game were switched. Due to the 2014 Winter Olympics, the regulation round ended in September 2013 instead of a spread-out schedule ending in November.

=== Map ===
2013 European Trophy teams (Divisions:: North,: West,: South,: East)

=== List ===
Division	Team	City	Home arena^{*}	Capacity	Joined NT/ET
North	Oulun Kärpät	(Finland) Oulu	Oulun Energia Areena	6,614	2006
North	Eisbären Berlin	(Germany) Berlin	O2 World	14,200	2010
North	Red Bull Salzburg	(Austria) Salzburg	Eisarena Salzburg	3,600	2010
North	Luleå HF	(Sweden) Luleå	Coop Norrbotten Arena	6,200	2011
North	Kometa Brno	(Czech Republic) Brno	Kajot Arena	7,200	2011
North	Mountfield České Budějovice	(Czech Republic) České Budějovice	Budvar Arena	6,421	2011
North	HC Plzeň	(Czech Republic) Plzeň	ČEZ Aréna	8,420	2011
North	Hamburg Freezers	(Germany) Hamburg	O2 World	12,947	2012
South	Linköpings HC	(Sweden) Linköping	Cloetta Center	8,500	2006
South	HV71	(Sweden) Jönköping	Kinnarps Arena	7,038	2008
South	Sparta Praha	(Czech Republic) Prague	Tipsport Arena	13,150	2010
South	Piráti Chomutov	(Czech Republic) Chomutov	Multifunkční aréna Chomutov	5,250	2012
South	KalPa	(Finland) Kuopio	Kuopion Jäähalli	5,225	2011
South	Slovan Bratislava	(Slovakia) Bratislava	Slovnaft Arena	10,000	2011
South	UPC Vienna Capitals	(Austria) Vienna	Albert Schultz Eishalle	7,000	2011
South	JYP	(Finland) Jyväskylä	Synergia-areena	4,628	2012
East	TPS	(Finland) Turku	HK Arena	11,820	2006
East	Tappara	(Finland) Tampere	Hakametsä Areena	7,800	2006
East	Djurgårdens IF	(Sweden) Stockholm	Hovet	8,094	2006
East	SC Bern	(Switzerland) Bern	PostFinance-Arena	17,131	2010^{**}
East	Bílí Tygři Liberec	(Czech Republic) Liberec	Tipsport Arena	7,500	2011
East	ČSOB Pojišťovna Pardubice	(Czech Republic) Pardubice	ČEZ Aréna	10,194	2011
East	Brynäs IF	(Sweden) Gävle	Läkerol Arena	8,585	2012
East	HC Fribourg-Gottéron	(Switzerland) Fribourg	BCF Arena	6,900	2012
West	Färjestad BK	(Sweden) Karlstad	Löfbergs Arena	8,647	2006
West	Frölunda Indians	(Sweden) Gothenburg	Scandinavium	12,044	2006
West	HIFK	(Finland) Helsinki	Helsinki Ice Hall	8,200	2006
West	Jokerit	(Finland) Helsinki	Hartwall Areena	13,349	2008
West	ZSC Lions	(Switzerland) Zürich	Hallenstadion	10,700	2010^{**}
West	Adler Mannheim	(Germany) Mannheim	SAP Arena	10,600	2010
West	ERC Ingolstadt	(Germany) Ingolstadt	Saturn Arena	4,815	2012
West	EV Zug	(Switzerland) Zug	Bossard Arena	7,015	2012

- Note (*): the stated home arenas don't have to be used in the European Trophy tournament.
- Note (**): SC Bern and ZSC Lions did not participate in 2011.

== Tournament structure ==
The European Trophy tournament was divided into regular round games between late July and November, where teams played each other in a predefined schedule, and a playoff weekend in December which was an elimination tournament where two teams played against each other to win in order to advance to the next round. The final remaining team was crowned the Red Bulls Salute Champion. If a game was tied after regulation time (60 minutes), an overtime lasting for 5 minutes was played. During overtime, both teams substituted only 4 players on the ice at once (except for 3 when either of the teams had a penalized player). If no team scored during the overtime period, a shootout was played, starting with three penalty shots for both teams. If the shootout remained tied after the first three rounds, sudden death rounds were played until a winning team had been determined.

=== Regular round games ===
In the regular round, the 32 teams were divided into four divisions and each team played once against each other team in the same division. Additionally, each team was assigned a "local rival" in the same division, against which they played a second game. Thus, each team played a total of 8 regular round games. Points were awarded for each game, with three points awarded for a win in regulation time, two points for winning in overtime or a shootout, one point for losing in overtime or a shootout, and zero points for a loss in regulation time. The two highest-ranked teams in each division qualified for the playoffs.

=== Playoffs ===
The European Trophy playoffs, known as the Red Bulls Salute, were the last part of the tournament. It was a single-elimination tournament, where two teams played against each other in order to advance to the next round. In the 2013 tournament, the Red Bull Salute took place in Berlin. There were no classification/placement games, meaning there were only Quarterfinals, Semifinals as well as the Final game. The Red Bulls Salute previously took place in Salzburg and Vienna in 2010 and 2011, and in Vienna and Bratislava in 2012. Before the 2013 tournament, the playoff hosts were always guaranteed a playoff spot (i.e. automatically qualified for the playoffs) and took the playoff spots of the worst 2nd-ranked teams of all divisions in the tournament.

=== Prize money ===
After the regulation round, the four division winners received €25 000 each, the four second-placed teams €20 000, and the third, fourth and fifth team of each division received €15 000, €10 000, and €5 000, respectively. Additionally, in the final of the Red Bulls Salute, the winning team received €50 000, while the losing finalist got €10 000. In total, €360 000 were given out during the entire 2013 European Trophy tournament.

== Winners ==
Nordic Trophy
Year	Regular round winners	Playoff winners (Nordic Trophy Champions)
2006	(Sweden) Färjestad BK	(Sweden) Färjestad BK
2007	(Finland) Oulun Kärpät	(Finland) Oulun Kärpät
2008	(Sweden) Linköpings HC	(Sweden) Linköpings HC
2009	(Sweden) HV71 (Swedish tournament)	(Sweden) Djurgårdens IF (Swedish tournament)
2009	(Finland) Lukko (Finnish tournament)	(Finland) Tappara (Finnish tournament)
European Trophy
Year	Regular round winners	Playoff winners (European Trophy Champions)
2010	(Sweden) HV71	(Germany) Eisbären Berlin
2011	(Czech Republic) Plzeň 1929	(Austria) Red Bull Salzburg
2012	(Sweden) Luleå HF	(Sweden) Luleå HF
2013	(Sweden) Färjestad BK	(Finland) JYP

Note that due to the divisioning system in the European Trophy tournaments, the regular-round winning team was determined by the best record of all teams.

== Medals (European Trophy 2010-2013) ==
Rank	Nation	Gold	Silver	Bronze	Total
1	Sweden	3	1	2	6
2	Czech Republic	1	0	0	1
3	Finland	0	1	1	2
4	Austria	0	1	0	1
4	Germany	0	1	0	1
6	Switzerland	0	0	1	1
Totals (6 entries)		4	4	4	12

== See also ==
- Champions Hockey League, a new tournament launched by the IIHF, starting in 2014
- European Trophy Junior
- Champions Hockey League (2008–09), a similar tournament played only in the 2008–09 season
