= 2010 European Trophy Junior =

The 2010 European Trophy Junior was the first and only European Trophy Junior ice hockey tournament, played between 19 August and 22 August 2010. The games were played at Löfbergs Lila Arena and Kobbs Arena, both in Karlstad, Sweden. Five games were broadcast through the Internet.

Frölunda HC won the tournament this year, beating Malmö Redhawks 5–4 in the final in a shootout.

== Participating clubs ==
The 2010 tournament featured 10 teams from Sweden, Finland, Austria, Norway and the Czech Republic.

Division CCM
Team	City
(Sweden) Färjestads BK	Karlstad
(Finland) HIFK	Helsinki
(Sweden) HV71	Jönköping
(Sweden) Malmö Redhawks	Malmö
(Austria) Red Bull Salzburg	Salzburg

Division Reebok
Team	City
(Sweden) Djurgårdens IF	Stockholm
(Sweden) Frölunda HC	Gothenburg
(Sweden) Linköpings HC	Linköping
Norway Team 20	Norway
(Czech Republic) Karlovy Vary	Karlovy Vary

== Regulation round ==
Team is qualified for the final

=== Division CCM ===
==== Standings ====
Pos	Team	Pld	W	OTW	OTL	L	GF	GA	GD	Pts	Qualification or relegation
1	(Sweden) Malmö Redhawks	4	2	1	1	0	15	9	+6	9	Advance to Final
2	(Finland) HIFK	4	2	1	0	1	13	10	+3	8	Advance to bronze medal game
3	(Sweden) HV71 Jönköping	4	1	0	3	0	13	12	+1	6	Advance to fifth place game
4	(Austria) Red Bull Salzburg	4	1	1	0	2	12	11	+1	5	Advance to seventh place game
5	(Sweden) Färjestads BK	4	0	1	0	3	8	19	−11	2	Advance to ninth place game

==== Games ====
August 19

- 13:00, Löfbergs Lila Arena: Färjestads BK – HV71 Jönköping 4 – 3 SD (1–0, 2–1, 0–2, 1–0)
- 17:00, Kobbs Arena: Malmö Redhawks – Red Bull Salzburg 4 – 2 (3–2, 0–0, 1–0)
- 20:00, Löfbergs Lila Arena: HIFK – Färjestads BK 6 – 1 (1–0, 3–1, 2–0)

August 20

- 09:30, Kobbs Arena: HV71 Jönköping – Malmö Redhawks 2 – 3 SD (1–1, 0–1, 1–0, 0–1)
- 13:00, Kobbs Arena: Red Bull Salzburg – HIFK 2 – 3 (0–0, 0–3, 2–0)
- 17:00, Löfbergs Lila Arena: Färjestads BK – Malmö Redhawks 2 – 6 (2–2, 0–1, 0–3)
- 20:30, Löfbergs Lila Arena: HV71 Jönköping – Red Bull Salzburg 3 – 4 GWS (2–1, 0–0, 1–2, 0–0, 0–1)

August 21

- 11:00, Löfbergs Lila Arena: Malmö Redhawks – HIFK 2 – 3 GWS (0–0, 0–1, 2–1, 0–0, 0–1)
- 15:00, Löfbergs Lila Arena: Red Bull Salzburg – Färjestads BK 4 – 1 (1–0, 2–1, 1–0)
- 19:30, Kobbs Arena: HIFK – HV71 Jönköping 1 – 5 (1–1, 0–3, 0–1)

=== Division Reebok ===
==== Standings ====
Pos	Team	Pld	W	OTW	OTL	L	GF	GA	GD	Pts	Qualification or relegation
1	(Sweden) Frölunda HC	4	3	1	0	0	15	6	+9	11	Advance to Final
2	(Sweden) Linköpings HC	4	3	0	0	1	15	12	+3	9	Advance to bronze medal game
3	(Czech Republic) Karlovy Vary	4	2	0	1	1	14	13	+1	7	Advance to fifth place game
4	Norway	4	0	1	0	3	9	16	−7	2	Advance to seventh place game
5	(Sweden) Djurgårdens IF	4	0	0	1	3	9	15	−6	1	Advance to ninth place game

==== Games ====
August 19

- 13:30, Kobbs Arena: Djurgårdens IF – Frölunda HC 1 – 3 (0–2, 1–1, 0–0)
- 16:30, Löfbergs Lila Arena: Linköpings HC – Norway Team 20 5 – 3 (3–0, 2–1, 0–2)
- 20:30, Kobbs Arena: Karlovy Vary – Djurgårdens IF 4 – 3 (0–1, 0–2, 4–0)

August 20

- 10:00, Löfbergs Lila Arena: Frölunda HC – Linköpings HC 5 – 2 (1–0, 3–0, 1–2)
- 13:30, Löfbergs Lila Arena: Norway Team 20 – Karlovy Vary 3 – 6 (1–2, 1–2, 1–2)
- 16:30, Kobbs Arena: Djurgårdens IF – Linköpings HC 3 – 5 (2–2, 0–2, 1–1)
- 20:00, Kobbs Arena: Frölunda HC – Norway Team 20 3 – 0 (2–0, 1–0, 0–0)

August 21

- 11:30, Kobbs Arena: Linköpings HC – Karlovy Vary 3 – 1 (1–1, 0–0, 2–0)
- 15:30, Kobbs Arena: Norway Team 20 – Djurgårdens IF 3 – 2 GWS (0–1, 1–0, 1–1, 0–0, 1–0)
- 19:00, Löfbergs Lila Arena: Karlovy Vary – Frölunda HC 3 – 4 SD (1–2, 1–1, 1–0, 0–1)

== Playoffs ==
=== Games ===
August 22

- 08:30, Kobbs Arena, place 9–10: Färjestads BK – Djurgårdens IF 1 – 3 (0–0, 1–1, 0–2)
- 09:00, Löfbergs Lila Arena, place 7–8: Red Bull Salzburg – Norway Team 20 3 – 5 (0–0, 3–3, 0–2)
- 12:00, Kobbs Arena, place 5–6: Karlovy Vary – HV71 Jönköping 1 – 4 (1–3, 0–0, 0–1)
- 12:30, Löfbergs Lila Arena, bronze medal game: Linköpings HC – HIFK 6 – 4 (0–3, 3–0, 3–1)
- 16:00, Löfbergs Lila Arena, final: Frölunda HC – Malmö Redhawks 5 – 4 GWS (3–2, 1–1, 0–1, 0–0, 1–0)

== Final standings ==
Gold medal	(Sweden) Frölunda HC
Silver medal	(Sweden) Malmö Redhawks
Bronze medal	(Sweden) Linköpings HC
4	(Finland) HIFK
5	(Sweden) HV71 Jönköping
6	(Czech Republic) Karlovy Vary
7	Norway Team 20
8	(Austria) Red Bull Salzburg
9	(Sweden) Djurgårdens IF
10	(Sweden) Färjestads BK

== Tournament All-star team ==
- D John Klingberg Frölunda HC
- D Victor Mångs Malmö Redhawks
- C Joachim Nermark Linköpings HC
- W Sebastian Dyk Malmö Redhawks
- W Sebastian Collberg Frölunda HC

== See also ==
- 2010 European Trophy
