= 2009 Nordic Trophy (Finnish tournament) =

Ice hockey competition

The Finnish edition of the 2009 Nordic Trophy ice hockey tournament was played between 6 August and 29 August 2009 and included only Finnish teams.

Tappara won this tournament, beating HIFK 2–0 in the final. For unexplained reasons, Kärpät and Jokerit left the tournament after the regulation round, and instead, Tappara joined the playoffs.

== Participating clubs ==
The Finnish edition of the 2009 Nordic Trophy featured 6 teams.

Team	City
(Finland) HIFK	Helsinki
(Finland) Jokerit	Helsinki
(Finland) Kärpät	Oulu

Team	City
(Finland) Lukko	Rauma
(Finland) Tappara	Tampere
(Finland) TPS	Turku

== Regulation round ==
=== Standings ===
Team is qualified for the playoffs
Team is eliminated from the tournament

Team	GP	W	OTW	OTL	L	GF	GA	DIF	PTS
(Finland) Lukko	5	4	0	0	1	11	4	+7	12
(Finland) HIFK	5	3	0	1	1	15	7	+8	10
(Finland) TPS	5	2	1	0	2	16	15	+1	8
(Finland) Kärpät	5	2	0	1	2	18	22	—4	7
(Finland) Jokerit	5	1	1	0	3	14	17	—3	5
(Finland) Tappara	5	1	0	0	4	14	23	—9	3

=== Games ===
==== 6 August ====
- Tappara – Jokerit 5 – 3 (0–0, 2–1, 3–2)
- Kärpät – HIFK 1 – 6 (0–1, 0–1, 1–4)

==== 7 August ====
- Jokerit – Lukko 1 – 2 (0–1, 0–0, 1–1)

==== 8 August ====
- HIFK – TPS 0 – 1 SO (0–0, 0–0, 0–0, 0–0, 0–1)
- Lukko – Kärpät 3 – 0 (0–0, 1–0, 2–0)

==== 11 August ====
- Kärpät – Tappara 5 – 4 (1–2, 2–0, 2–2)
- TPS – Lukko 2 – 1

==== 13 August ====
- Tappara – HIFK 1 – 5 (0–2, 1–1, 0–2)
- Kärpät – Jokerit 4 – 5 OT (1–0, 2–3, 1–1, 0–1)

==== 18 August ====
- TPS – Tappara 7 – 3 (1–2, 4–0, 2–1)
- HIFK – Lukko 0 – 2 (0–1, 0–0, 0–1)

==== 20 August ====
- Lukko – Tappara 3 – 1 (1–0, 1–0, 1–1)
- TPS – Kärpät 4 – 8 (2–3, 0–2, 2–3)
- HIFK – Jokerit 4 – 2 (0–0, 1–2, 3–0)

==== 21 August ====
- Jokerit – TPS 3 – 2 (0–0, 2–2, 1–0)

== Playoffs ==
=== 28 August ===
- Semifinal: TPS – HIFK 2 – 6 (0–3, 1–1, 1–2)
- Semifinal: Lukko – Tappara 1 – 3 (1–0, 0–2, 0–1)

=== 29 August ===
- Bronze medal game: Lukko – TPS 5 – 0
- Final: HIFK – Tappara 0 – 2 (0–0, 0–1, 0–1)

== Final standings ==
Gold medal	(Finland) Tappara
Silver medal	(Finland) HIFK
Bronze medal	(Finland) Lukko
4	(Finland) TPS
5	(Finland) Kärpät
6	(Finland) Jokerit

== See also ==
- 2009 Nordic Trophy (Swedish tournament)
- 2009 Nordic Trophy Junior
