= Patrik Norén =

Swedish ice hockey player

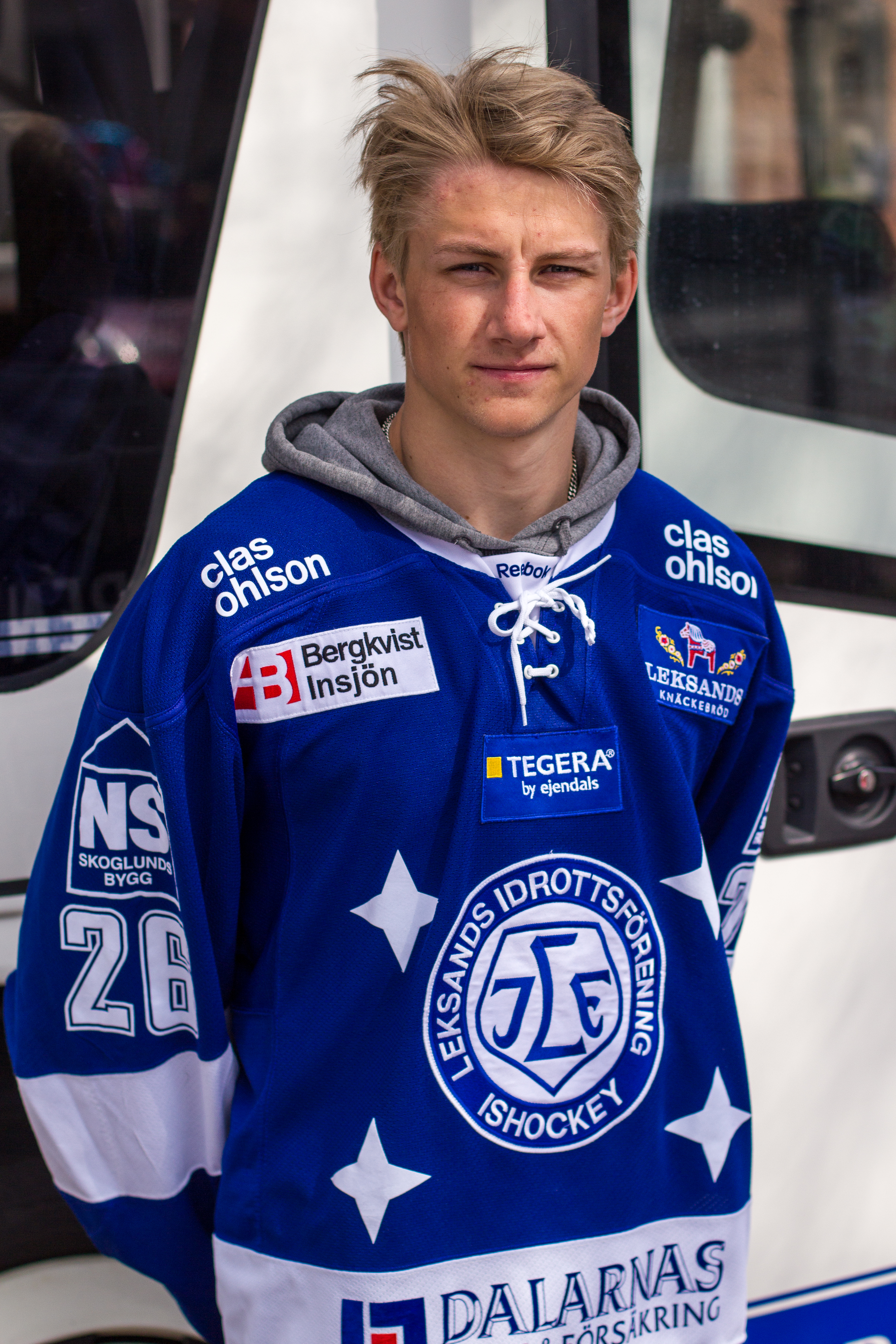
- Born: December 1, 1992 (age 32) Säter, Sweden
- Height: 5 ft 11 in (180 cm)
- Weight: 183 lb (83 kg; 13 st 1 lb)
- Position: Defence
- Shoots: Left
- SHL team Former teams: Malmö Redhawks; Leksands IF; Skellefteå AIK
- Playing career: 2009–present

Patrik Norén (born December 1, 1992) is a Swedish professional ice hockey defenseman currently playing for Malmö Redhawks in the Swedish Hockey League (SHL).

== Playing career ==
Norén played for Leksands IF since moving from Skedvi/Säter IF in 2008–09 until 2014, when he signed with Timrå IK. He played two seasons with Skellefteå AIK in the SHL before returning to Leksands IF in the 2020–21 season.

== Career statistics ==
			Regular season					Playoffs
Season	Team	League	GP	G	A	Pts	PIM	GP	G	A	Pts	PIM
2007–08	Skedvi/Säter IF	J20	8	0	0	0	35	—	—	—	—	—
2007–08	Skedvi/Säter IF	Div.2	8	0	1	1	2	—	—	—	—	—
2008–09	Leksands IF	J18	18	1	5	6	49	—	—	—	—	—
2008–09	Leksands IF	J18	11	0	1	1	8	—	—	—	—	—
2009–10	Leksands IF	J18	5	1	5	6	10	—	—	—	—	—
2009–10	Leksands IF	J18	6	0	2	2	2	3	0	0	0	2
2009–10	Leksands IF	J20	34	3	7	10	68	3	0	2	2	0
2009–10	Leksands IF	Allsv	16	0	0	0	4	—	—	—	—	—
2010–11	Leksands IF	Allsv	36	1	11	12	30	—	—	—	—	—
2011–12	Leksands IF	Allsv	52	2	4	6	36	10	1	0	1	12
2012–13	Leksands IF	Allsv	51	1	3	4	52	10	0	1	1	4
2013–14	Timrå IK	Allsv	48	8	12	20	50	—	—	—	—	—
2014–15	Almtuna IS	Allsv	47	7	9	16	73	—	—	—	—	—
2015–16	Almtuna IS	Allsv	51	5	7	12	36	5	0	1	1	4
2016–17	Leksands IF	SHL	43	1	7	8	20	—	—	—	—	—
2017–18	Leksands IF	Allsv	52	3	11	14	42	11	0	2	2	18
2018–19	Skellefteå AIK	SHL	52	1	9	10	16	5	0	0	0	0
2019–20	Skellefteå AIK	SHL	35	2	3	5	22	—	—	—	—	—
2019–20	Skellefteå AIK	J20	2	0	1	1	0	—	—	—	—	—
2020–21	Leksands IF	SHL	52	1	7	8	34	4	0	0	0	29
2021–22	Leksands IF	SHL	45	5	10	15	38	3	0	0	0	2
2022–23	Leksands IF	SHL	52	2	7	9	45	3	1	1	2	0
2023–24	Leksands IF	SHL	50	3	16	19	26	7	1	0	1	4
2024–25	Leksands IF	SHL	31	2	0	2	28	—	—	—	—	—
SHL totals			360	17	59	76	229	22	2	1	3	35
