= Skedvi/Säter IF =

- City: Säter
- League: (Sweden) Division 2
- Division: 2
- Founded: 2001
- Home arena: Milko Arena
- Colors: Red, white
- Website: www.laget.se/SSIF

Franchise history
- –2001: Säters IF
- –2001: Skevdi

Skedvi/Säter Ishockeyförening (English: Skedvi/Säter Ice Hockey Club, abbreviated Skedvi/Säter IF) is a Swedish ice hockey club based in the small town of Säter in southern Dalarna. The club was created in 2001 as a merger of Säters IF and Skedvi.

After being promoted from Division 2 in 2013, the club played in group C of Division 1, the third tier of ice hockey in Sweden, in the 2013-14 season, but was relegated the same year and has continued playing in Division 2 since then.

Current and previous players include Sergei Mylnikov (1993-1995, who also coached the club between 1995-1997), Patrik Norén, (2008-2014) and Simon Erlandsson (2016-).

== Season-by-season ==
Year	Level	Division	Record		Notes
Year	Level	Division	Position	W-T-L W-OT-L	Notes
2008–09	Tier 4	Division 2	3rd	17–4–5	
2008–09	Division 1 qualifier		3rd	5–0–0–3	
2009–10	Tier 4	Division 2	5th	15–3–10	
2010–11	Tier 4	Division 2	4th	15–3–2–8	
2010–11	Division 1 qualifier		3rd	4–0–0–4	
2011–12	Tier 4	Division 2	2nd	20–1–3–4	
2012–13	Tier 4	Division 2	1st	26–2–0–5	
2012–13	Division 1 qualifier		2nd	4–0–0–2	Promoted to Division 1
2013–14	Tier 3	Division 1C	10th		
2014–15	Tier 4	Division 2	7th		
2015–16	Tier 4	Division 2	3rd		
2016–17	Tier 4	Division 2	4th		
2017-18	Tier 4	Division 2	1st		
2017-18	Division 1 qualifier		5th		Didn't qualify for promotion
2018–19	Tier 4	Division 2	5th		
2019–20	Tier 4	Division 2	4th		
2021–22	Tier 4	Division 2	11th		
2022–23	Tier 4	Division 2	8th		
2023–24	Tier 4	Division 2	TBD		
