= Simon Erlandsson =

Swedish ice hockey player

- Born: September 4, 1994 (age 31) Falun, Sweden
- Height: 6 ft 1 in (185 cm)
- Weight: 201 lb (91 kg; 14 st 5 lb)
- Position: Defence
- Shoots: Left
- Div.2 team Former teams: Skedvi/Säter IF; Leksands IF
- Playing career: 2013–present

Simon Erlandsson (born September 4, 1994) is a Swedish professional ice hockey defenceman. He is currently playing with Skedvi/Säter IF of the Swedish Division 2 (Div.2).

Erlandsson made his Swedish Hockey League debut playing with Leksands IF during the 2013–14 SHL season.
