= 2008 Nordic Trophy =

Ice hockey competition

Tournament information

The 2008 Nordic Trophy was the third Nordic Trophy ice hockey tournament, played between August 7 and September 6, 2008. The final weekend was played in Cloetta Center and Stångebro Arena.

== Standings ==
Nordic Trophy	GP	W	L	T	OTW	OTL	PSW	PSL	GF	GA	PTS
y- (Sweden) Linköpings HC	9	7	2	0	0	0	0	0	31	19	14
y- (Sweden) Frölunda HC	9	7	2	0	0	0	0	0	25	18	14
y- (Sweden) Djurgårdens IF	9	6	3	0	0	0	0	0	33	23	12
y- (Finland) HIFK	9	4	3	2	0	0	2	0	30	26	12
x- (Finland) Kärpät	9	5	4	0	0	0	0	0	20	17	10
x- (Finland) TPS	9	3	5	1	0	0	1	0	18	29	8
x- (Sweden) Färjestads BK	9	3	5	1	0	0	0	1	22	27	7
x- (Sweden) HV71	9	3	6	0	0	0	0	0	19	25	6
z- (Finland) Jokerit	9	2	6	1	0	0	0	1	24	29	5
z- (Finland) Tappara	9	2	6	1	0	0	0	1	21	30	5

y - clinched semi-final spot for championship, x - clinched semi-final spot for 5th place, z - play for 9th place

== Game log ==
2008 Nordic Trophy game log
Group stage

Date	Home	Result	Visitor	Venue	Attendance
Thursday, August 7	Jokerit	2–3	HV71	Varkaus	952
Thursday, August 7	Kärpät	2–0	Färjestad	Oulu	6014
Thursday, August 7	Tappara	4–7	Linköping	Lempäälä	437
Thursday, August 7	TPS	4–1	Frölunda	Turku	2015
Thursday, August 7	HIFK	3–2	Djurgården	Järvenpää	920
Friday, August 8	Kärpät	2–0	HV71	Oulu	2741
Friday, August 8	TPS	4–3 GWS	Färjestad	Loimma	554
Friday, August 8	Jokerit	2–4	Linköping	Varkaus	872
Friday, August 8	HIFK	0–1	Frölunda	Järvenpää	1015
Friday, August 8	Tappara	4–2	Djurgården	Tampere	2357
Sunday, August 10	Tappara	5–4	HV71	Kangasala	490
Sunday, August 10	Jokerit	3–4	Färjestad	Joensuu	2343
Sunday, August 10	HIFK	0–3	Linköping	Tikkurila	1860
Sunday, August 10	Kärpät	1–3	Frölunda	Oulu	2562
Sunday, August 10	TPS	2–6	Djurgården	Paimio	355
Thursday, August 14	TPS	2–7	HIFK	?	?
Thursday, August 14	Linköping	4–1	Djurgården	?	?
Friday, August 15	Färjestad	1–3	Frölunda	?	?
Tuesday, August 19	Jokerit	5–3	Tappara	?	?
Tuesday, August 19	Kärpät	4–1	TPS	?	?
Tuesday, August 19	Linköping	3–2	Färjestad	?	?
Thursday, August 21	Linköping	2–3	TPS	?	?
Thursday, August 21	HV71	3–5	HIFK	?	?
Thursday, August 21	Färjestad	2–1	Tappara	?	?
Thursday, August 21	Frölunda	5–3	Jokerit	?	?
Thursday, August 21	Djurgården	5–2	Kärpät	?	?
Friday, August 22	Linköping	?	Kärpät	?	?
Friday, August 22	HV71	?	TPS	?	?
Friday, August 22	Färjestad	?	HIFK	?	?
Friday, August 22	Frölunda	?	Tappara	?	?
Friday, August 22	Djurgården	4–2	Jokerit	Hovet	625
Sunday, August 24	HV71	1–2	Djurgården	Kinnarps Arena	4700
Tuesday, August 26	HIFK	?	Tappara	?	?
Tuesday, August 26	Kärpät	?	Jokerit	?	?
Tuesday, August 26	HV71	?	Linköping	?	?
Tuesday, August 26	Djurgården	6–2	Frölunda	Vallentuna Ishall	1619
Thursday, August 28	Tappara	?	Kärpät	?	?
Thursday, August 28	TPS	?	Jokerit	?	?
Friday, August 29	HIFK	?	Kärpät	?	?
Friday, August 29	Djurgården	5–3	Färjestad	Jordal Amfi	2172
Friday, August 29	Frölunda	?	HV71	?	?
Tuesday, September 2	Jokerit	?	HIFK	?	?
Tuesday, September 2	Tappara	?	TPS	?	?
Tuesday, September 2	Färjestad	?	HV71	?	?
Tuesday, September 2	Frölunda	?	Linköping	?	?

Playoff

Date	Venue	Home	Visitor	Result
