= Borås Ishall =

Indoor arena in Borås, Sweden

Coordinates: 57°44′02″N 12°55′48″E

- Interactive map of Borås Ishall
- Location: Borås, Sweden
- Type: indoor arena

Construction
- Opened: 1972

Tenant
- Borås HC

Borås Ishall is an indoor arena located in Borås, Sweden. It is Borås HC's current home arena and has a capacity of 3,700 spectators.
