= Oulun Kärpät =

- City: Oulu
- League: Liiga
- Founded: 1946
- Home arena: Oulun Energia Areena (capacity: 6,485)
- Colours: Black, yellow, white
- General manager: Tommi Virkkunen
- Head coach: Petri Matikainen
- Captain: Eemil Erholz
- Parent club: Oulun Kärpät Oy
- Website: karpat.fi
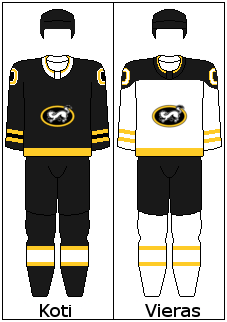

Championships
- Playoff championships: 1981, 2004, 2005, 2007, 2008, 2014, 2015, 2018

Oulun Kärpät (Finnish for "Oulu Ermines", sometimes referred to as Kärpät Oulu) is a Finnish professional ice hockey team based in Oulu and playing in the top-tier Finnish Liiga. Kärpät have won the Finnish championship title eight times, and is the most successful Finnish ice hockey team in the 21st century.

== History ==
=== Early years ===
In the spring of 1946, three young men decided to found a new sports club in Oulu. At the constitutional meeting on May 15, 1946, the club was named "Oulun Kärpät 46". At first, Kärpät played football (soccer) and its first winter sport was bandy.

In the first annual meeting in January 1947, an ice hockey section was established. At the beginning of the new decade, Kärpät was somewhat successful in ice hockey and it became the main sport of the club. The first game at the highest level, then known as "SM-sarja" was played on the December 4, 1960, against HJK of Helsinki, but the visit to the highest level was short and Kärpät lost their position in the series. They made it to the highest level again in 1965–66, but again lost their position. The third attempt in 1967–68 did not produce a better performance, as Kärpät lost all their games.

From the first years onward, Kärpät placed emphasis on working with junior players. The team's E-juniors won the first Finnish championship in 1971.

=== Promotion and early SM-liiga years ===
When the SM-liiga was founded in August 1975, Kärpät were still playing level below in the first division. The team earned promotion to the elite league after the 1976–77 season. In their debut season in SM-liiga, Kärpät managed to finish seventh out of ten teams. During their second season in the top level in 1978–79, however, the team struggled and finished last in the regular season, but proved victorious in the relegation league and retained their place in the top league. On the positive side, Kärpät's Kari Jalonen was awarded Jarmo Wasama memorial trophy for the best rookie in league after the season.

=== Success in the 1980s ===
After having avoided relegation, Kärpät acquired more skilled players, such as Mikko Leinonen. The team's performance greatly improved, and in the 1979–80 season Kärpät made it to the playoffs where they proved victorious in the bronze medal game. This marked the first time when Kärpät claimed a medal on the national level. The emergence of young players was continued by Pekka Arbelius who was titled rookie of the year.

In the following season, 1980–81, Kärpät finished third in the regular series, and in the play-offs fought their way to the final series where they would face Tappara. Tappara started the best-out-of-five series in a strong manner, for instance by winning the third game by a score of 13–2. After this devastating loss the series was 2–1 for Tappara. Regardless, the Kärpät head coach Kari Mäkinen managed to boost the team's morale, and consequently Kärpät won two consecutive games by scores of 6–1 and 5–2, respectively. Thus, Kärpät clinched the series 3–2 and celebrated the first title for the franchise. The winning goal was scored by Kari Suoraniemi, and Kari Jalonen was named the MVP of the playoffs.

Before the 1981–82 season, a number of key players' contracts expired and they decided to continue their careers elsewhere. To illustrate, the team lost key and core players such as Jalonen, Suoraniemi, Leinonen and Kai Suikkanen, as well as cult player Reijo Ruotsalainen. With a weakened roster, Kärpät had to settle for fifth place and the following year, they were nearly relegated. During the era of Pentti Matikainen as a head coach, Kärpät remained a championship contender and won bronze medals in three consecutive years (1983–84, 1984–85 and 1985–86). In Matikainen's last season as a coach, in 1986–87, Kärpät somewhat surprisingly won the regular season, but lost to Tappara in the finals. Matikainen was replaced by Kari Mäkinen in 1987–88, but the team failed to make the play-offs. Esko Nokelainen was named as the new coach, but to little avail. In the following season, in 1988–89, Kärpät reached a nadir and Nokelainen was sacked mid-season. Eventually, Kärpät were relegated from the SM-liiga as they lost to Jokerit in the relegation league.

=== Bankruptcy and lower divisions ===
The goal was to rise again shortly, but it did not work out. Due to financial constraints, Kärpät went into bankruptcy, but in the fall of 1995, they made it to the first division again. In the first year, they came eighth and lost in the playoffs. The next year, they went against KalPa for a place in the league, but ultimately lost. In the following year, they again lost to KalPa. For the 1998–99 season, Kärpät acquired coach Juhani Tamminen. After they played very well in the regular series, they lost to TuTo in the playoffs.

=== Return to the elite league ===
The next year, Kärpät finally qualified to the SM-liiga by beating Lahti Pelicans in the qualification series. The first season in the elite league was full of ups-and-downs, but Kärpät finished fourth and sixth in successive seasons. They then finally made it to the finals in, but lost to Tappara, similar to in 1987. In the 2003–04 season, Kärpät played in the finals against TPS and finally won their second Finnish Championship. In 2004–05, Kärpät won the Finnish Championship again when they defeated Jokerit in the finals, winning the best-of-five series 3–1. They retained the championship title in the 2006–07 season by beating Jokerit in the finals (3–0) and winning all their games in the playoffs. The first three championships of the 2000s have been celebrated in Oulu with feasts, each gathering tens of thousands of people to rejoice. In the 2007–08 season, the organization won its second consecutive championship title, and the fourth within the last five years, by defeating Espoo Blues in the finals, 4–1.

After a six-year lull, Kärpät returned to the top of Finnish ice hockey under the guidance of Lauri Marjamäki, by winning two consecutive championship titles in the 2013–14 and 2014–15 seasons. In both occasions, the team defeated Tappara in the play-off finals. Consequently, the team's Liiga championships tally was taken to seven. In the 2015–16 season Kärpät failed to defend the championship title, but were able to win the bronze medal game. In the same season, Kärpät finished runners-up in the 2015–16 Champions Hockey League losing 2–1 in the final to Sweden's Frölunda HC.

After the successive tenure of Marjamäki, Kai Suikkanen was announced as the new head coach of Kärpät for the 2016–17 season. Kärpät ended the season tenth in the final results, and Suikkanen was relived of his duties after the season, and was replaced by assistant coach Mikko Manner. Manner's first season as the head coach proved highly successful, as Kärpät won the championship again, defeating Tappara in the finals. The following season, the team advanced to the finals yet again, ultimately getting silver, after being defeated by HPK in the finals.

In the third season under the tenure of Manner, 2019–20, Kärpät won the regular season again, but the playoffs were cancelled due to the COVID-19 pandemic. The following season proved to be the most difficult of Manner's seasons, as the team ended seventh in the regular season, as well as in the final standings after losing in the quarter-finals to HIFK. Manner was succeeded by Lauri Mikkola for the 2021–22 season, but Mikkola ended up being replaced mid-season by returning Lauri Marjamäki.

Marjamäki's return ended up unsuccessful, as the team's struggles continued, ending up seventh in 2021–22, and ninth in the 2022–23 season. Marjamäki ended up being replaced by assistant coach Ville Mäntymaa in the middle of the 2023–24 season. Mäntymaa helped the team get bronze medals at the end of the season, but the following season saw himself in turn being replaced by Petri Matikainen. Kärpät ended the season thirteenth, failing to qualify for the playoffs.

== Honours ==
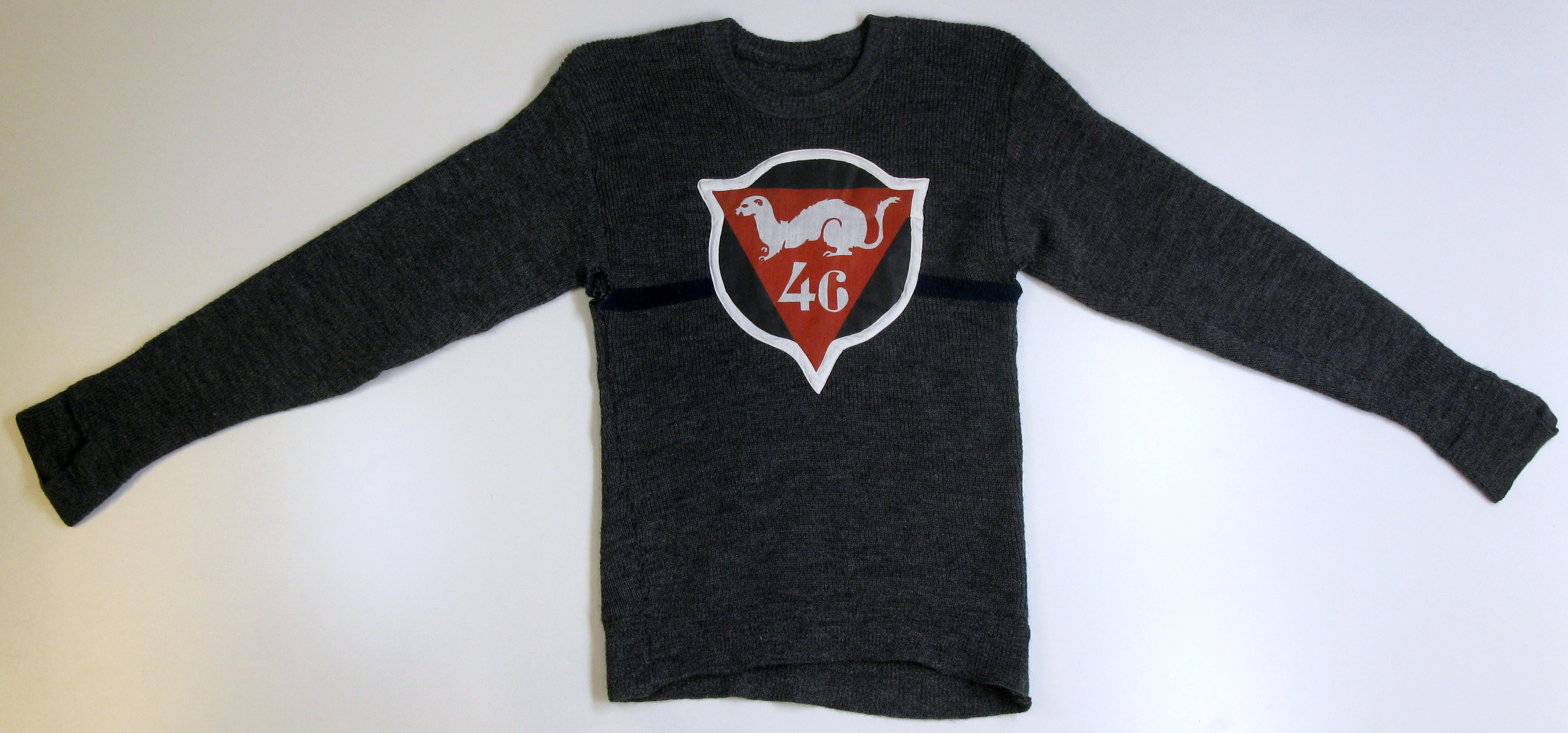
First Kärpät jersey from the end of 1940s

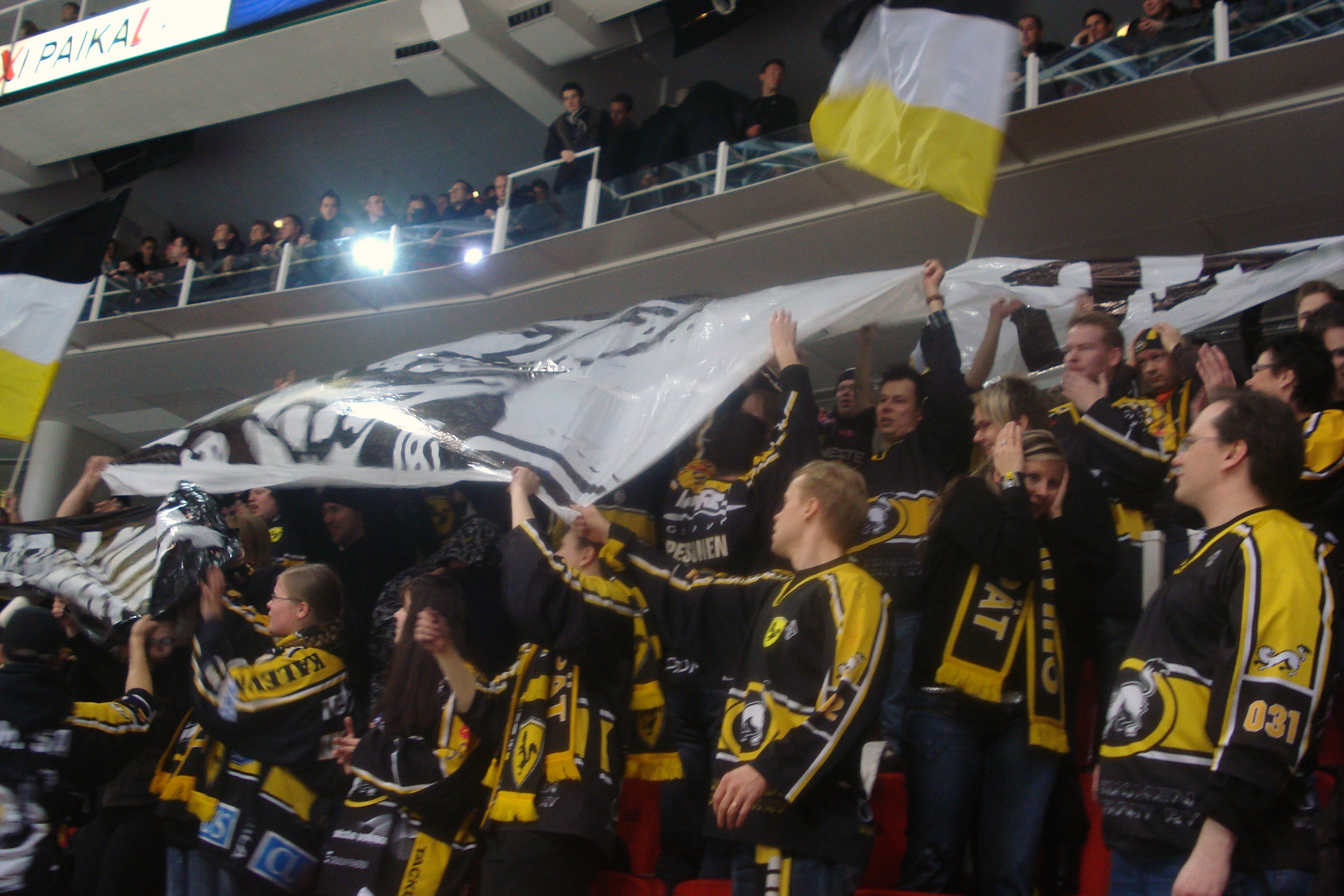
EtäKärpät fan club are a group of supporters gathered from outside Oulu

=== Champions ===
- (gold) SM-liiga Kanada-malja (8): 1981, 2004, 2005, 2007, 2008, 2014, 2015, 2018

- (gold) Finnish Liiga A-juniors (U20) (4): 1979, 1985, 2010, 2019

=== Runners-up ===
- (silver) SM-liiga (4): 1987, 2003, 2009, 2019
- (bronze) SM-liiga (7): 1980, 1984, 1985, 1986, 2006, 2016, 2024

=== International ===
Champions Hockey League:

- (silver) Runner-up (1): 2016

IIHF European Champions Cup:

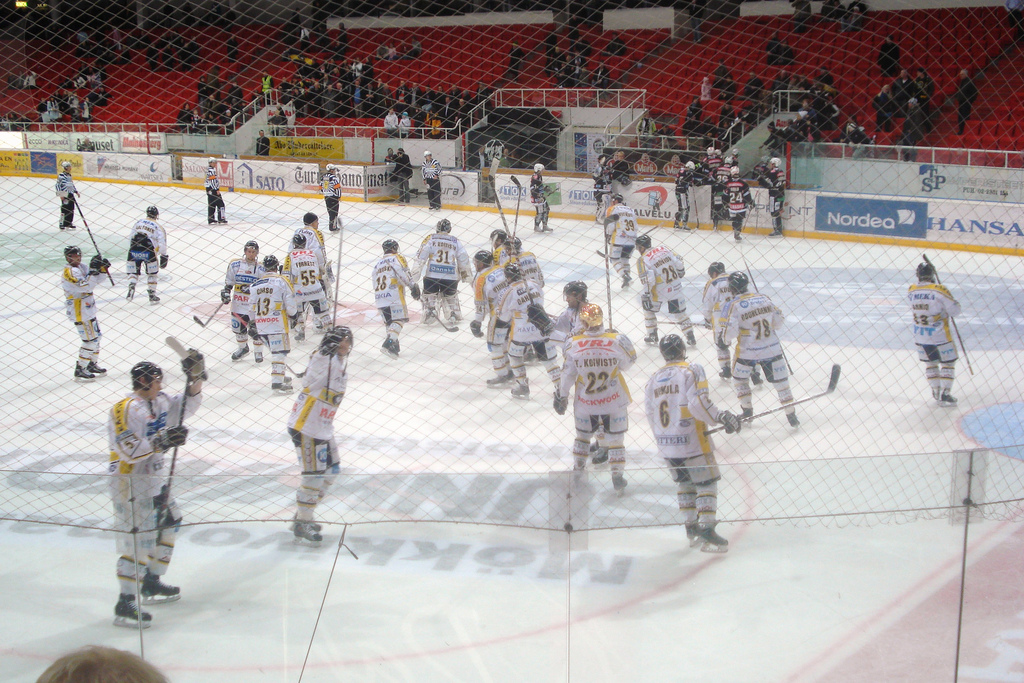
Kärpat winning against TPS in 2009.

- (silver) Runner-up (2): 2005, 2006

Nordic Trophy:

- (gold) Champion (1): 2007

Tampere Cup:

- (gold) Champion (1): 2003

Other awards for the club:

- Harry Lindblad trophy (SM-Liiga regular season winner, since 1975): 1987, 2005, 2006, 2007, 2008, 2013, 2014, 2015, 2018, 2019, 2020.
- I-Divisioona winner (it was the second level of ice hockey in Finland): 1976–77, 1996–97, 1997–98, 1998–99, 1999–00

== Players ==
=== Current roster ===
Updated 23 September 2024.

No.	Nat	Player	Pos	S/G	Age	Acquired	Birthplace
29	(Finland)	Arttu Alasiurua	F	L	21	2024	Kiiminki, Finland
18	(Finland)	Aleksi Antti-Roiko	C	L	25	2021	Oulu, Finland
12	(Finland)	Marko Anttila (C)	RW	R	41	2022	Lempäälä, Finland
9	(Sweden)	Victor Berglund	D	R	27	2023	Örnsköldsvik, Sweden
91	(Canada)	Reid Gardiner	RW	R	30	2024	Prince Albert, Saskatchewan, Canada
16	(Finland)	Ville Heikkala	LW	L	27	2021	Kiiminki, Finland
59	(Finland)	Julius Hermonen	LW	L	29	2016	Oulu, Finland
63	(Czech Republic)	Martin Jandus	D	R	28	2023	Prague, Czech Republic
39	(Finland)	Viljami Juusola	D	L	23	2024	Kirkkonummi, Finland
33	(Finland)	Tomi Karhunen	G	L	37	2023	Oulu, Finland
4	(Finland)	Tommi Kivistö (A)	D	L	35	2022	Vantaa, Finland
52	(Finland)	Miika Koivisto (A)	D	L	36	2023	Vaasa, Finland
80	(Finland)	Maxim Korpimäki	F	L	22	2023	Hämeenkyrö, Finland
87	(Czech Republic)	Michal Kovařčík	C	R	29	2024	Nový Jičín, Czech Republic
37	(United States)	Josh Melnick	C	R	31	2024	Annandale, New Jersey, United States
22	(Finland)	Olli Nikupeteri	LW	L	23	2024	Kemi, Finland
55	(Finland)	Atte Ohtamaa (A)	D	L	39	2021	Nivala, Finland
62	(Finland)	Joel Olkkonen	D	R	33	2022	Hyvinkää, Finland
25	(Finland)	Arttu Paaso	D	L	24	2021	Oulu, Finland
26	(United States)	Austin Rueschhoff	F	R	29	2024	Wentzville, Missouri, United States
27	(Canada)	Ben Tardif	LW	L	26	2024	Notre-Dame-de-l'Île-Perrot, Quebec, Canada
11	(Finland)	Patrik Virta	C	R	30	2024	Hämeenlinna, Finland
53	(Finland)	Niclas Westerholm	G	L	29	2022	Helsinki, Finland
19	(Finland)	Sisu Yliniemi	C	L	23	2024	Haukipudas, Finland

== Retired numbers ==
- 5 (Finland) Lasse Kukkonen
- 6 (Finland) Ilkka Mikkola
- 10 (Finland) Reijo Ruotsalainen
- 15 (Finland) Markku Kiimalainen
- 24 (Finland) Jari Viuhkola

== NHL alumni ==
- (Finland) Sebastian Aho (2014–2016)
- (Sweden) Jonas Andersson (2008–2009)
- (Sweden) Johan Backlund (2012–2013)
- (Finland) Niklas Bäckström (2002–2006)
- (Canada) Drew Bannister (2002–2003)
- (Sweden) Josef Boumedienne (2004–2005, 2006–2007, 2013)
- (Canada) Andy Chiodo (2008)
- (Canada) Daniel Corso (2008–2009)
- (Finland) Toni Dahlman (2008–2009)
- (Russia) Evgeny Davydov (2001)
- (Canada) Jason Dawe (2003)
- (Canada) Jason Demers (2012–2013)
- (Finland) Joonas Donskoi (2009–2015)
- (Finland) Mikael Granlund (2009)
- (Finland) Kari Haakana (2008)
- (Finland) Niklas Hagman (1999–2001, 2016–2017)
- (United States) Jeff Hamilton (2001–2002)
- (Sweden) Jonathan Hedström (2010)
- (Czech Republic) Ivan Huml (2011–2016)
- (Finland) Hannes Hyvönen (1993–1994, 2006–2008)
- (Finland) Kari Jalonen (1978–1982, 1985–1987, 1993)
- (Finland) Martti Järventie (2008–2009)
- (Finland) Jussi Jokinen (2001–2005, 2012–2013, 2019-2021)
- (Finland) Jere Karalahti (2007)
- (Czech Republic) Lukáš Kašpar (2009–2010)
- (Czech Republic) Kamil Kreps (2010–2011)
- (Finland) Lasse Kukkonen (1999–2003, 2004–2006, 2013–present)
- (Finland) Mikko Lehtonen (1999–2006, 2007–2008, 2009–2014)
- (Canada) Ross Lupaschuk (2006–2007)
- (Slovakia) Ivan Majesky (2006–2007)
- (Czech Republic) Zdeněk Nedvěd (2004)
- (Finland) Janne Niinimaa (1991–1993, 2004–2005)
- (Finland) Markus Nutivaara (2014–2016)
- (Sweden) Michael Nylander (2004)
- (Finland) Janne Pesonen (2001–2008)
- (Finland) Lasse Pirjetä (1991–1993, 2001–2002)
- (Finland) Esa Pirnes (1995–1999, 2014–2016)
- (Finland) Joni Pitkänen (2000–2003)
- (Czech Republic) Tomáš Plíhal (2012–2013)
- (Finland) Jesse Puljujärvi (2014–2016, 2019–2020)
- (Finland) Mika Pyörälä (2001–2007, 2013–2017)
- (Finland) Pekka Rinne (2003–2005)
- (Czech Republic) Pavel Rosa (2009–2011)
- (Finland) Reijo Ruotsalainen (1975–1981, 1993, 1996–1998)
- (Canada) Martin St. Pierre (2010)
- (Russia) Denis Shvidki (2009)
- (Finland) Ilkka Sinisalo (1993–1994)
- (Canada) Brad Smyth (2003–2004)
- (Slovakia) Jozef Stümpel (2012)
- (Finland) Kai Suikkanen (1976–1981, 1983–1990)
- (Czech Republic) Petr Tenkrát (2002–2006, 2010–2011)
- (United States) Tim Thomas (2001–2002)
- (Canada) Kyle Turris (2012)
- (Russia) Dmitri Yushkevich (2009–2010)

== See also ==
- 2014–15 Oulun Kärpät season
