= 2006–07 Frölunda HC season =

Swedish ice hockey club season

2006–07 Frölunda HC
- League: 9th Elitserien
- 2006–07 record: 22–24–9
- Home record: 12–9–6
- Road record: 10–15–3
- Goals for: 167
- Goals against: 162

Team information
- General manager: Christer Kellgren
- Coach: Stephan Lundh, later succeeded by Per Bäckman
- Captain: Jonas Johnson
- Alternate captains: Ronnie Sundin; Jonas Esbjörs
- Arena: Scandinavium
- Average attendance: 11,469 (1st)

Team leaders
- Goals: Steve Kariya (23)
- Assists: Tomi Kallio (36)
- Points: Tomi Kallio (54)
- Penalty minutes: Antti-Jussi Niemi (110)
- Wins: Joel Gistedt (17)
- Goals against average: Joel Gistedt (2.58)

The 2006–07 Frölunda HC season began with many rosters moves. 11 players were lost to other teams or retirement. 7 players were acquired to replace the players that were leaving, most notably Steve Kariya and Martin Cibák. Another two players, Joel Gistedt and Jonas Ahnelöv, were brought up from the juniors. The team's management was confident that they were going to finish in the top as they had done many previous seasons. It didn't take a long time to see that the team would not be the bona fide top team as they had been the previous seasons. Instead it was clear that they would be fighting for a playoff spot.

On November 7, after a rough start of the season, head coach Stephan Lundh was relieved of his duties. On November 8, Per Bäckman was signed from VIK Västerås HK as the new head coach of Frölunda HC. On November 9, assistant coach Calle Johansson decided to resign from his duties due to Lundh's release.

== Regular season ==
=== Season standings ===
| Elitserien | GP | W | L | T | PTS | GF | GA |
|---|---|---|---|---|---|---|---|
| Färjestads BK | 55 | 26 | 13 | 16 | 99 | 197 | 145 |
| HV71 | 55 | 25 | 15 | 15 | 93 | 170 | 150 |
| Modo Hockey | 55 | 24 | 21 | 10 | 85 | 159 | 140 |
| Linköpings HC | 55 | 22 | 19 | 14 | 82 | 151 | 153 |
| Timrå IK | 55 | 22 | 21 | 12 | 82 | 129 | 136 |
| Brynäs IF | 55 | 18 | 17 | 20 | 80 | 146 | 137 |
| Luleå HF | 55 | 21 | 23 | 11 | 79 | 171 | 163 |
| Mora IK | 55 | 23 | 23 | 9 | 78 | 147 | 155 |
| Frölunda HC | 55 | 22 | 24 | 9 | 76 | 167 | 162 |
| Djurgårdens IF | 55 | 19 | 22 | 14 | 76 | 146 | 148 |
| Skellefteå AIK | 55 | 18 | 24 | 13 | 73 | 139 | 178 |
| Malmö Redhawks | 55 | 11 | 29 | 15 | 48 | 119 | 174 |

=== Game log ===
==== September ====
| # | Date | Home | Score | Visitor | OT | Decision | Attendance | Record | Pts |
| 1 | September 18 | Linköping | 5–2 | Frölunda | | Salo | 7,162 | 0–1–0 | 0 |
| 2 | September 21 | Frölunda | 3–3 | Djurgården | T | Salo | 10,272 | 0–1–1 | 1 |
| 3 | September 23 | Färjestad | 4–4 | Frölunda | T | Salo | 8,049 | 0–1–2 | 2 |
| 4 | September 26 | Frölunda | 2–3 | Skellefteå | | Salo | 9,960 | 0–2–2 | 2 |
| 5 | September 28 | Frölunda | 1–6 | HV 71 | | Salo | 10,423 | 0–3–2 | 2 |
| 6 | September 30 | Skellefteå | 4–6 | Frölunda | | Gistedt | 4,905 | 1–4–2 | 5 |

==== October ====
| # | Date | Visitor | Score | Home | OT | Decision | Attendance | Record | Pts |
| 7 | October 3 | Frölunda | 1–2 | Timrå | | Gistedt | 9,745 | 1–4–2 | 5 |
| 8 | October 5 | Malmö | 3–3 | Frölunda | T | Gistedt | 3,890 | 1–4–3 | 6 |
| 9 | October 7 | Frölunda | 2–2 | Brynäs | T | Gistedt | 11,926 | 1–4–4 | 7 |
| 10 | October 10 | Frölunda | 1–2 | Modo | | Gistedt | 10,161 | 1–5–4 | 7 |
| 11 | October 14 | Mora | 2–3 | Frölunda | | Gistedt | 4,011 | 2–5–4 | 10 |
| 12 | October 17 | Frölunda | 1–3 | Linköping | | Gistedt | 9,756 | 2–6–4 | 10 |
| 13 | October 19 | Djurgården | 2–0 | Frölunda | | Gistedt | 7,468 | 2–7–4 | 10 |
| 14 | October 21 | Frölunda | 3–0 | Färjestad | | Gistedt | 12,044 | 3–7–4 | 13 |
| 15 | October 26 | HV 71 | 2–1 | Frölunda | | Gistedt | 7,038 | 3–8–4 | 13 |
| 16 | October 28 | Timrå | 4–1 | Frölunda | | Salo | 5,742 | 3–9–4 | 13 |
| 17 | October 31 | Frölunda | 4–3 | Malmö | W | Salo | 11,585 | 3–9–5 | 15 |

==== November ====
| # | Date | Visitor | Score | Home | OT | Decision | Attendance | Record | Pts |
| 18 | November 2 | Frölunda | 2–2 | Brynäs | T | Salo | 12,044 | 3–9–6 | 16 |
| 19 | November 4 | Modo | 6–1 | Frölunda | | Gistedt | 7,555 | 3–10–6 | 16 |
| 20 | November 16 | Frölunda | 4–0 | Luleå | | Gistedt | 11,500 | 4–10–6 | 19 |
| 21 | November 18 | Mora | 5–3 | Frölunda | | Gistedt | 3,819 | 4–11–6 | 19 |
| 22 | November 21 | Modo | 6–2 | Frölunda | | Gistedt | 6,267 | 4–12–6 | 19 |
| 23 | November 23 | Skellefteå | 5–2 | Frölunda | | Salo | 4,191 | 4–13–6 | 19 |
| 24 | November 25 | Frölunda | 5–2 | Mora | | Gistedt | 12,044 | 5–13–6 | 22 |
| 25 | November 28 | Färjestad | 2–4 | Frölunda | | Gistedt | 8,250 | 6–13–6 | 25 |
| 26 | November 30 | Frölunda | 5–1 | Djurgården | | Gistedt | 11,901 | 7–13–6 | 28 |

==== December ====
| # | Date | Visitor | Score | Home | OT | Decision | Attendance | Record | Pts |
| 27 | December 2 | HV71 | 4–5 | Frölunda | | Gistedt | 7,038 | 8–13–6 | 31 |
| 28 | December 4 | Frölunda | 4–1 | Timrå | | Gistedt | 12,002 | 9–13–6 | 34 |
| 29 | December 7 | Brynäs | 3–1 | Frölunda | | Gistedt | 6,649 | 9–14–6 | 34 |
| 30 | December 11 | Malmö | 1–4 | Frölunda | | Salo | 3,817 | 10–14–6 | 37 |
| 31 | December 19 | Frölunda | 5–0 | Linköping | | Salo | 11,627 | 11–14–6 | 40 |
| 32 | December 21 | Luleå | 6–3 | Frölunda | | Salo | 4,825 | 11–15–6 | 40 |
| 33 | December 27 | Frölunda | 4–2 | Modo | | Salo | 12,044 | 12–15–6 | 43 |

==== January ====
| # | Date | Visitor | Score | Home | OT | Decision | Attendance | Record | Pts |
| 34 | January 2 | Frölunda | 1–2 | Mora | | Salo | 11,894 | 12–16–6 | 43 |
| 35 | January 4 | Frölunda | 2–4 | Färjestad | | Salo | 12,044 | 12–17–6 | 43 |
| 36 | January 6 | Djurgården | 3–2 | Frölunda | L | Salo | 5,582 | 12–17–7 | 44 |
| 37 | January 8 | Frölunda | 3–2 | HV71 | | Salo | 11,641 | 13–17–7 | 47 |
| 38 | January 11 | Timrå | 5–1 | Frölunda | | Salo | 4,714 | 13–18–7 | 47 |
| 39 | January 16 | Brynäs | 1–0 | Frölunda | | Gistedt | 5,680 | 13–19–7 | 47 |
| 40 | January 18 | Frölunda | 5–3 | Malmö | | Gistedt | 11,157 | 14–19–7 | 50 |
| 41 | January 20 | Linköping | 2–7 | Frölunda | | Gistedt | 7,998 | 15–19–7 | 53 |
| 42 | January 23 | Luleå | 2–5 | Frölunda | | Gistedt | 4,225 | 16–19–7 | 56 |
| 43 | January 25 | Frölunda | 5–2 | Skellefteå | | Gistedt | 12,044 | 17–19–7 | 59 |
| 44 | January 27 | Malmö | 3–8 | Frölunda | | Gistedt | 4,569 | 18–19–7 | 62 |
| 45 | January 29 | Frölunda | 0–3 | Mora | | Gistedt | 11,648 | 18–20–7 | 62 |

==== February ====
| # | Date | Visitor | Score | Home | OT | Decision | Attendance | Record | Pts |
| 46 | February 1 | Djurgården | 4–2 | Frölunda | | Gistedt | 8,169 | 18–21–7 | 62 |
| 47 | February 3 | Frölunda | 2–2 | Brynäs | | Gistedt | 12,044 | 18–21–8 | 63 |
| 48 | February 13 | Frölunda | 0–6 | Färjestad | | Gistedt | 12,044 | 18–22–8 | 63 |
| 49 | February 15 | Luleå | 4–1 | Frölunda | | Salo | 4,734 | 18–23–8 | 63 |
| 50 | February 17 | Frölunda | 5–1 | Linköping | | Salo | 12,044 | 19–23–8 | 66 |
| 51 | February 20 | Modo | 7–4 | Frölunda | | Salo | 6,572 | 19–24–8 | 66 |
| 52 | February 24 | HV71 | 2–8 | Frölunda | | Gistedt | 7,038 | 20–24–8 | 69 |
| 53 | February 26 | Skellefteå | 2–8 | Frölunda | | Gistedt | 4,830 | 21–24–8 | 72 |
| 54 | February 28 | Frölunda | 4–5 | Luleå | L | Gistedt | 12,044 | 21–24–9 | 73 |

==== March ====
| # | Date | Visitor | Score | Home | OT | Decision | Attendance | Record | Pts |
| 55 | March 2 | Frölunda | 2–1 | Timrå | | Gistedt | 12,044 | 22–24–9 | 76 |

- Green background indicates win.
  - Light green background indicates overtime win.
- Red background indicates regulation loss.
  - Light red background indicates overtime loss.
- White background indicates tie game.

== Season Stats ==
=== Scoring Leaders ===
| # | Name | Nationality | GP | G | A | P | PIM | GP | G | A | P | PIM |
|---|---|---|---|---|---|---|---|---|---|---|---|---|
| 71 | Tomi Kallio (RW) | Finland | 55 | 18 | 36 | 54 | 103 | – | – | – | – | – |
| 28 | Martin Plüss (C) | Switzerland | 54 | 17 | 33 | 50 | 96 | – | – | – | – | – |
| 24 | Niklas Andersson (LW) | Sweden | 51 | 21 | 27 | 48 | 75 | – | – | – | – | – |
| 18 | Steve Kariya (LW) | Canada | 55 | 23 | 16 | 39 | 34 | – | – | – | – | – |
| 30 | Jonas Johnson (C) | Sweden | 55 | 17 | 18 | 35 | 46 | – | – | – | – | – |
| 20 | Sean Bergenheim (RW) | Finland | 36 | 16 | 17 | 33 | 80 | – | – | – | – | – |
| 33 | Martin Cibak (C) | Slovakia | 55 | 10 | 13 | 23 | 94 | – | – | – | – | – |
| 12 | Karl Fabricius (RW) | Sweden | 55 | 8 | 12 | 20 | 47 | – | – | – | – | – |
| 21 | Markus Seikola (D) | Finland | 49 | 5 | 14 | 19 | 46 | – | – | – | – | – |
| 5 | Jan-Axel Alavaara (D) | Sweden | 54 | 5 | 13 | 18 | 80 | – | – | – | – | – |
| 23 | Ronnie Sundin (D) | Sweden | 55 | 5 | 9 | 14 | 60 | – | – | – | – | – |
| 7 | Antti-Jussi Niemi (D) | Finland | 48 | 3 | 11 | 14 | 110 | – | – | – | – | – |
| 11 | Magnus Kahnberg (LW) | Sweden | 26 | 3 | 10 | 13 | 8 | – | – | – | – | – |
| 16 | Anton Axelsson (LW) | Sweden | 52 | 5 | 7 | 12 | 14 | – | – | – | – | – |
| 8 | Arto Tukio (D) | Finland | 50 | 2 | 8 | 10 | 36 | – | – | – | – | – |
| 3 | Ari Vallin (D) | Finland | 23 | 3 | 6 | 9 | 20 | – | – | – | – | – |
| 22 | Jonas Esbjörs (LW) | Sweden | 54 | 3 | 6 | 9 | 24 | – | – | – | – | – |
| 85 | Johan Fransson (D) | Sweden | 35 | 0 | 6 | 6 | 18 | – | – | – | – | – |
| 10 | Fredrik Johansson (C) | Sweden | 53 | 1 | 4 | 5 | 20 | – | – | – | – | – |
| 44 | Jonas Ahnelöv (D) | Sweden | 46 | 1 | 3 | 4 | 20 | – | – | – | – | – |
| 25 | Oscar Ackeström (D) | Sweden | 10 | 1 | 1 | 2 | 18 | – | – | – | – | – |
| 9 | Henrik Malmström (RW) | Sweden | 46 | 0 | 1 | 1 | 14 | – | – | – | – | – |
| 41 | Isaac Haag (C) | Sweden | 1 | 0 | 0 | 0 | 0 | – | – | – | – | – |
| 98 | Joakim Andersson (C) | Sweden | 1 | 0 | 0 | 0 | 0 | – | – | – | – | – |
| 27 | Mikkel Bødker (RW) | Denmark | 2 | 0 | 0 | 0 | 0 | – | – | – | – | – |
| 27 | Philip Larsen (D) | Denmark | 5 | 0 | 0 | 0 | 0 | – | – | – | – | – |
| 61 | Johan Ryno (RW) | Sweden | 14 | 0 | 0 | 0 | 14 | – | – | – | – | – |
| 26 | Patrik Carlsson (RW) | Sweden | 16 | 0 | 0 | 0 | 4 | – | – | – | – | – |
| 25 | Tomi Pettinen (D) | Finland | 27 | 0 | 0 | 0 | 14 | – | – | – | – | – |
| | | | Regular season | | | | | Playoffs | | | | |

=== Goaltending ===
Note: GP = Games played; W = Wins; L = Losses; OT = Overtime losses; GA = Goals against; SO = Shutouts; Sv% = Save percentage; GAA = Goals against average

| Player | GP | W | L | OT | GA | SO | Sv% | GAA |
| Joel Gistedt | 35 | 17 | 13 | 4 | 88 | 2 | .897 | 2.58 |
| Tommy Salo | 22 | 5 | 11 | 5 | 70 | 1 | .875 | 3.29 |

== Transactions ==
| Player | Former team |
| Johan Ryno | IK Oskarshamn |
| Fredrik Johansson | VIK Västerås HK |
| Karl Fabricius | Luleå HF |
| Tomi Pettinen | New York Islanders |
| Johan Fransson | Luleå HF |
| Steve Kariya | Espoo Blues |
| Martin Cibák | Tampa Bay Lightning |
| Jere Myllyniemi | Rögle BK |
| Henrik Malmström | Brynäs IF |
| Sean Bergenheim | Lokomotiv Yaroslavl |
| Magnus Kahnberg | Peoria Rivermen |
| Ari Vallin | Rochester Americans |

| Player | New team |
| Sebastian Karlsson | Brynäs IF |
| Jason Krog | Atlanta Thrashers |
| Tom Koivisto | Rapperswil-Jona Lakers |
| Richard Demén-Willaume | Arizona Sundogs |
| Mikael Sandberg | Retire |
| Johan Witehall | Retire |
| Peter Högardh | SCL Tigers |
| Magnus Kahnberg | St. Louis Blues |
| Jari Tolsa | Espoo Blues |
| Joel Lundqvist | Dallas Stars |
| Johnny Oduya | New Jersey Devils |
| Jere Myllyniemi | Rauman Lukko |
| Tomi Pettinen | Leksands IF |

=== Trades ===
| January 31, 2007 | To Linköpings HC Johan Fransson | To Frölunda HC Oscar Ackeström |

== Drafted Players ==
Frölunda HC players picked at the 2007 NHL entry draft in Columbus, Ohio.

| | Player | Nationality | Drafted By | Year | Round | Overall |
|---|---|---|---|---|---|---|
| C | Lars Eller | Denmark | St. Louis Blues | 2007 | 1st | 13th |
| G | Joel Gistedt | Sweden | Phoenix Coyotes | 2007 | 2nd | 36th |
| LW | Simon Hjalmarsson | Sweden | St. Louis Blues | 2007 | 2nd | 39th |
| C | Joakim Andersson | Sweden | Detroit Red Wings | 2007 | 3rd | 88th |
| D | Jens Hellgren | Sweden | Colorado Avalanche | 2007 | 6th | 155th |
