= 2009–10 Frölunda HC season =

Swedish ice hockey club season

2009–10 Frölunda HC
- League: 7th Elitserien
- 2009–10 record: 22–22–11
- Home record: 16–7–5
- Road record: 6–15–6
- Goals for: 155
- Goals against: 156

Team information
- General manager: Kent Norberg
- Coach: Ulf Dahlén
- Assistant coach: Stephan Lundh; Emil Olsén; Dan Jablonic
- Captain: Joel Lundqvist
- Alternate captains: Per-Johan Axelsson; Riku Hahl
- Arena: Scandinavium
- Average attendance: 11,399

Team leaders
- Goals: Fredrik Pettersson (20)
- Assists: Mathis Olimb (25)
- Points: Tomi Kallio (40)
- Penalty minutes: Patric Blomdahl (90)
- Goals against average: Sebastian Idoff (2.01)

The 2009–10 Frölunda HC season was the team's 30th season in Elitserien.

Frölunda captured a playoff spot, ending up 7th in the regular season. The team met Linköpings HC in the quarterfinals, where they led the series 3–1. However, Linköping won the three following games and thus Frölunda were knocked out of the playoffs.

== Pre-season ==
=== Nordic Trophy ===
==== Game log ====
2008 Nordic trophy game log

Group stage: 3–2–0 (home: 2–0–0; road: 1–2–0)
Round	Date	Opponent	Score	Goaltender	Venue	Attendance	Record	Pts
1	11 August	Djurgården	4–0	Holmqvist	Frölundaborg	5,283	1–0–0	3
2	14 August	Linköping	4–3	Holmqvist	Platenhallen	1,200	2–0–0	6
3	17 August	HV71	3–5	Idoff	Aplarinken	1,250	2–1–0	6
4	20 August	Malmö	5–3	Holmqvist	Borås Ishall	816	3–1–0	9
5	21 August	Färjestad	1–3	Idoff	Säffle	1,200	3–2–0	9

Playoffs
Round	Date	Opponent	Score	Goaltender	Venue	Attendance
Semifinal	28 August	Djurgården	0–3	Holmqvist	Åland	445
Third place playoff	29 August	HV71	1–5	Idoff	Åland	N/A

Legend: Win (3 points) Overtime win (2 point) Loss (0 points) Overtime loss (1 point)

=== Exhibition games ===
==== Game log ====
Exhibition games game log

Exhibition games: 3–2–0 (home: 2–2–0; road: 1–0–0)
Date	Opponent	Score	Goaltender	Venue	Attendance
15 August	HC Lugano	5–4	Idoff	Gullmarsborg	900
4 September	Salavat Yulaev Ufa	5–6	Hansson	Frölundaborg	1,044
17 September	HV71	5–1	Holmqvist	Frölundaborg	2,466
19 September	Rögle	1–3	Idoff	Frölundaborg	1,112
18 February	Östersunds HC	7–0	Törnqvist	Z-hallen	1,137
24 February	Rögle	–		Lindab Arena

Legend: Win Loss Tie

== Regular season ==
=== Standings ===
Elitserien	GP	W	L	T	OTW	OTL	GF	GA	Pts
y – HV71	55	25	16	5	6	3	188	155	95
x – Djurgårdens IF	55	26	17	7	2	3	161	130	92
x – Linköpings HC	55	27	20	3	3	2	163	139	92
x – Skellefteå AIK	55	26	20	4	1	4	146	141	88
x – Färjestads BK	55	25	20	3	2	5	132	144	87
x – Brynäs IF	55	20	17	11	6	1	144	124	84
x – Frölunda HC	55	22	22	9	1	1	155	156	78
x – Timrå IK	55	18	19	8	3	7	138	150	75
e – Modo Hockey	55	16	20	8	7	4	161	150	74
e – Luleå HF	55	19	23	2	4	7	139	143	74
r – Södertälje SK	55	14	27	4	7	3	131	176	63
r – Rögle BK	55	13	30	2	4	6	127	173	55

x – clinched playoff spot; y – clinched regular season league title; e – eliminated from playoff contention; r – played in relegation series

=== Game log ===
2008–09 game log

September: 3–0–0 (home: 1–0–0; road: 2–0–0)
Round	Date	Opponent	Score	Decision	Venue	Attendance	Record	Pts
1	24 September	Modo	4–2	Holmqvist	Swedbank Arena	6,596	1–0–0	3
2	26 September	Timrå	3–1	Holmqvist	Scandinavium	11,259	2–0–0	6
3	29 September	Brynäs	2–1	Holmqvist	Läkerol Arena	4,680	3–0–0	9

October: 4–6–2 (home: 3–2–1; road: 1–4–1)
Round	Date	Opponent	Score	Decision	Venue	Attendance	Record	Pts
4	1 October	Djurgården	1–5	Holmqvist	Scandinavium	10,102	3–1–0	9
5	3 October	Skellefteå	2–5	Holmqvist	Skellefteå Kraft Arena	5,030	3–2–0	9
6	5 October	Luleå	2–6	Holmqvist	Scandinavium	9,463	3–3–0	9
7	8 October	Linköping	1–5	Holmqvist	Cloetta Center	5,962	3–4–0	9
8	13 October	Södertälje	2–2	Holmqvist	Scandinavium	9,354	3–4–1	10
9	15 October	Färjestad	6–1	Holmqvist	Scandinavium	11,909	4–4–1	13
10	17 October	Rögle	5–3	Holmqvist	Lindab Arena	4,714	5–4–1	16
11	22 October	HV71	1–4	Holmqvist	Kinnarps Arena	7,000	5–5–1	16
12	24 October	Södertälje	2–4	Holmqvist	AXA Sports Center	3,871	5–6–1	16
13	27 October	Färjestad	1–1	Holmqvist	Löfbergs Lila Arena	7,790	5–6–2	17
14	29 October	Modo	4–2	Holmqvist	Scandinavium	11,088	6–6–2	20
15	31 October	Skellefteå	5–2	Holmqvist	Scandinavium	11,761	7–6–2	23

November: 4–5–2 (home: 4–1–1; road: 0–4–1)
Round	Date	Opponent	Score	Decision	Venue	Attendance	Record	Pts
16	1 November	Timrå	3–4	Holmqvist	E.ON Arena	4,044	7–7–2	23
17	10 November	Linköping	3–1	Holmqvist	Scandinavium	9,409	8–7–2	26
18	12 November	HV71	2–2	Holmqvist	Kinnarps Arena	7,000	8–7–3	27
19	14 November	Rögle	5–4	Holmqvist	Scandinavium	10,561	9–7–3	30
20	17 November	Djurgården	1–3	Idoff	Hovet	7,397	9–8–3	30
21	19 November	Brynäs	3–2	Holmqvist	Scandinavium	11,042	10–8–3	33
22	21 November	Luleå	1–2	Holmqvist	Coop Norrbotten Arena	5,543	10–9–3	33
23	24 November	HV71	0–3	Holmqvist	Scandinavium	12,019	10–10–3	33
24	26 November	Linköping	0–4	Holmqvist	Cloetta Center	6,722	10–11–3	33
25	28 November	Djurgården	3–3	Holmqvist	Scandinavium	11,492	10–11–4	34
26	30 November	Södertälje	6–1	Holmqvist	Scandinavium	9,027	11–11–4	37

December: 2–2–4 (home: 1–0–2; road: 1–2–2)
Round	Date	Opponent	Score	Decision	Venue	Attendance	Record	Pts
27	3 December	Rögle	2–2	Holmqvist	Lindab Arena	4,095	11–11–5	38
28	5 December	Timrå	3–3	Holmqvist	Scandinavium	9,893	11–11–6	39
29	8 December	Luleå	3–2	Holmqvist	Scandinavium	10,117	11–11–7	41
30	10 December	Modo	3–3	Holmqvist	Swedbank Arena	6,069	11–11–8	42
31	12 December	Skellefteå	5–3	Holmqvist	Skellefteå Kraft Arena	4,528	12–11–8	45
32	26 December	Brynäs	2–5	Holmqvist	Läkerol Arena	6,522	12–12–8	45
33	28 December	Färjestad	4–1	Holmqvist	Ullevi	31,144	13–12–8	48
34	30 December	Södertälje	2–3	Holmqvist	AXA Sports Center	3,454	13–13–8	48

January: 3–5–3 (home: 3–2–1; road: 0–3–2)
Round	Date	Opponent	Score	Decision	Venue	Attendance	Record	Pts
35	2 January	Rögle	5–2	Holmqvist	Scandinavium	10,372	14–13–8	51
36	5 January	HV 71	2–2	Holmqvist	Scandinavium	12,009	14–13–9	52
37	9 January	Luleå	4–5	Holmqvist	Coop Norrbotten Arena	5,299	14–13–10	53
38	12 January	Brynäs	1–3	Holmqvist	Scandinavium	9,970	14–14–10	53
39	14 January	Linköping	4–3	Holmqvist	Scandinavium	9,554	15–14–10	56
40	16 January	Färjestad	2–5	Holmqvist	Löfbergs Lila Arena	8,583	15–15–10	56
41	21 January	Djurgården	3–4	Holmqvist	Hovet	6,341	15–16–10	56
42	23 January	Modo	2–3	Holmqvist	Scandinavium	12,044	15–17–10	56
43	26 January	Timrå	1–2	Holmqvist	E.ON Arena	5,022	15–18–10	56
44	28 January	Skellefteå	5–4	Holmqvist	Scandinavium	11,481	16–18–10	59
45	30 January	Modo	1–1	Holmqvist	Fjällräven Center	7,600	16–18–11	60

February: 3–1–0 (home: 2–0–0; road: 1–1–0)
Round	Date	Opponent	Score	Decision	Venue	Attendance	Record	Pts
46	4 February	Linköping	3–4	Holmqvist	Cloetta Center	7.130	16–19–11	60
47	6 February	Färjestad	4–1	Holmqvist	Scandinavium	12,044	17–19–11	63
50	8 February	Luleå	2–1	Holmqvist	Scandinavium	10,381	18–19–11	66
48	27 February	Brynäs	3–1	Holmqvist	Läkerol Arena	6,700	19–19–11	69

March: 3–3–0 (home: 2–2–0; road: 1–1–0)
Round	Date	Opponent	Score	Decision	Venue	Attendance	Record	Pts
49	2 March	HV71	7–3	Holmqvist	Scandinavium	11,295	20–19–11	72
51	4 March	Södertälje	4–1	Holmqvist	Scandinavium	9,182	21–19–11	75
52	6 March	Rögle	3–7	Holmqvist	Lindab Arena	3,360	21–20–11	75
53	9 March	Timrå	1–2	Holmqvist	Scandinavium	9,823	21–21–11	75
54	1 March	Skellefteå	4–2	Holmqvist	Skellefteå Kraft Arena	5,130	22–21–11	78
55	13 March	Djurgården	–	Törnqvist	Scandinavium	11,394	22–22–11	78

Legend: Win (3 points) Overtime win (2 point) Loss (0 points) Overtime loss (1 point) Tie (1 point)

== Playoffs ==
=== Quarterfinal vs. (4) Linköpings HC ===
Playoffs

Quarterfinal vs #3 Linköping: 3–2 (home: 2–1; road: 1–3)
Round	Date	Opponent	Score	Decision	Venue	Attendance	Series
1	18 March	Linköping	4–3 (OT)	Holmqvist	Scandinavium	9,299	1–0
2	20 March	Linköping	2–6	Holmqvist	Cloetta Center	7,910	1–1
3	22 March	Linköping	2–1 (OT)	Holmqvist	Scandinavium	10,497	2–1
4	24 March	Linköping	4–3	Holmqvist	Cloetta Center	7,927	3–1
5	26 March	Linköping	2–3	Holmqvist	Cloetta Center	7,932	3–2
6	28 March	Linköping	2–3	Holmqvist	Scandinavium	11,199	3–3
7	30 March	Linköping	2–4	Holmqvist	Cloetta Center		3–4

Legend: Win Loss

== Statistics ==
=== Skaters ===
Name	Pos	Nationality	GP	G	A	P	PIM	GP	G	A	P	PIM
Name	Pos	Nationality	Regular season					Playoffs				
Tomi Kallio	RW	Finland	55	18	22	40	40	7	2	6	8	6
Fredrik Pettersson	RW	Sweden	54	20	18	38	67	7	3	1	4	10
Mathis Olimb	LW	Norway	55	9	25	34	20	7	1	3	4	4
Niklas Andersson	LW	Sweden	54	15	17	32	50	7	3	1	4	29
Joel Lundqvist	C	Sweden	49	11	20	31	34	1	0	0	0	0
Janne Niskala	D	Finland	50	12	16	28	34	7	3	4	7	6
Christian Bäckman	D	Sweden	47	10	18	28	46	7	1	2	3	6
Per-Johan Axelsson	LW	Sweden	47	10	16	26	51	5	1	0	1	6
Joakim Andersson	C	Sweden	55	6	12	18	42	7	1	2	3	0
Mikael Johansson	C	Sweden	55	4	11	15	14	7	0	0	0	4
Carl Klingberg	RW	Sweden	42	6	7	13	16	7	0	0	0	2
Riku Hahl	C	Finland	26	3	10	13	12	7	2	3	5	4
Tobias Viklund	D	Sweden	48	4	8	12	14	7	0	0	0	2
Philip Larsen	D	Denmark	42	1	9	10	20	7	0	0	0	4
Martin Røymark	RW	Norway	55	5	4	9	12	6	0	0	0	2
Nicklas Lasu	LW	Sweden	51	2	7	9	10	7	0	1	1	2
Patric Blomdahl	LW	Sweden	49	6	2	8	90	7	1	0	1	16
Ville Mäntymaa	D	Finland	28	2	6	8	18	5	0	0	0	0
Oscar Hedman	D	Sweden	52	2	5	7	12	7	0	0	0	0
Andreas Karlsson	C	Sweden	15	3	3	6	6	7	1	5	6	2
Kristián Kudroč	D	Slovakia	28	1	5	6	76	—	—	—	—	—
Peter Andersson	D	Sweden	21	1	4	5	4	—	—	—	—	—
Mikko Lehtonen	D	Finland	9	3	1	4	10	—	—	—	—	—
Jens Karlsson	RW	Sweden	10	1	2	3	2	4	0	0	0	2
Henrik Tömmernes	D	Sweden	27	0	3	3	10	7	0	1	1	2
Jussi Makkonen	C	Finland	9	0	1	1	2	—	—	—	—	—
Johan Holmqvist	G	Sweden	55	0	1	1	2	7	0	1	1	0
Johan Sundström	LW	Sweden	1	0	0	0	0	—	—	—	—	—
Johan Alm	D	Sweden	2	0	0	0	0	—	—	—	—	—
Jonathan Johansson	C	Sweden	2	0	0	0	0	—	—	—	—	—
Henrik Lundberg	G	Sweden	3	0	0	0	0	—	—	—	—	—
Charlie Torstensson	G	Sweden	3	0	0	0	0	—	—	—	—	—
Erik Andersson	C	Sweden	4	0	0	0	0	—	—	—	—	—
Pontus Hansson	G	Sweden	7	0	0	0	0	—	—	—	—	—
Gusten Törnqvist	G	Sweden	11	0	0	0	0	7	0	0	0	0
Sebastian Idoff	G	Sweden	31	0	0	0	0	—	—	—	—	—

== Transactions ==
Acquired
Player	Former team	Date	Notes
Tobias Viklund	Skellefteå AIK	1 April	
Carl Klingberg	Frölunda J20	22 April	
Henrik Tömmernes	Frölunda J20	22 April	
Ville Mäntymaa	JYP	26 April	
Mathis Olimb	Augsburger Panther	27 April	
Martin Røymark	Sparta Warriors	27 April	
Sebastian Idoff	Frölunda J20	13 May	
Mikko Lehtonen	Timrå IK	16 July	
Joel Lundqvist	Dallas Stars	24 July	
Per-Johan Axelsson	Boston Bruins	27 July	
Christian Bäckman	Columbus Blue Jackets	9 October	
Kristián Kudroč	Brynäs IF	29 October	
Jussi Makkonen	Dinamo Minsk	4 December	
Gusten Törnqvist	Almtuna IS	29 January	
Jens Karlsson	Borås HC	31 January	

Leaving
Player	New team	Date	Notes
Magnus Kahnberg	Brynäs IF	31 March	
Ronnie Sundin	retired	2 April	
Jonas Johnson	retired	2 April	
Tuukka Mäntylä	Tappara	2 April	
Ari Ahonen	KalPa	2 April	
Johan Andersson	Växjö Lakers HC	2 April	
Philip Larsen	Dallas Stars	20 April	
Erik Karlsson	Ottawa Senators	7 May	
Joe DiPenta	Buffalo Sabres	11 July	
John Pohl	Chicago Wolves	29 July	
Karl Fabricius	Luleå HF	1 September	
Jonas Nordquist	Brynäs IF	1 September	
Mikko Lehtonen	Kärpät	21 November	
Jussi Makkonen	JYP	27 January	
Kristián Kudroč	Ässät	31 January	

== Drafted players ==
Frölunda HC players picked in the 2010 NHL entry draft at the Staples Center in Los Angeles.

Round	Pick	Player	Nationality	NHL team
5th	131st	John Klingberg	Sweden	Dallas Stars
