= 2007–08 Frölunda HC season =

Swedish ice hockey club season

2007–08 Frölunda HC
- League: 6th Elitserien
- 2007–08 record: 23–22–10
- Home record: 15–8–5
- Road record: 8–14–5
- Goals for: 159
- Goals against: 157

Team information
- General manager: Christer Kellgren
- Coach: Per Bäckman, later succeeded by Roger Melin
- Captain: Jonas Johnson
- Alternate captains: Ronnie Sundin; Jonas Esbjörs
- Arena: Scandinavium
- Average attendance: 11,688 (1st)

Team leaders
- Goals: Tomi Kallio (27)
- Assists: Niklas Andersson (37)
- Points: Niklas Andersson (49)
- Penalty minutes: Oscar Ackeström (83)
- Wins: Ari Ahonen (23)
- Goals against average: Ari Ahonen (2.52)

The 2007–08 Frölunda HC season began with the retirement of goaltender Tommy Salo.

== Nordic Trophy ==
=== Standings ===
| Team | GP | W | L | T | GF | GA | Pts | OTW | OTL | PSW | PSL |
|---|---|---|---|---|---|---|---|---|---|---|---|
| (Finland) Kärpät | 7 | 4 | 1 | 2 | 25 | 19 | 11 | 1 | 0 | 0 | 1 |
| (Sweden) Frölunda HC | 7 | 4 | 1 | 2 | 25 | 25 | 11 | 0 | 0 | 1 | 1 |
| (Finland) Tappara | 7 | 3 | 2 | 2 | 20 | 15 | 10 | 1 | 0 | 1 | 0 |
| (Sweden) Färjestad BK | 7 | 3 | 2 | 2 | 27 | 22 | 9 | 0 | 1 | 1 | 0 |
| (Finland) TPS | 7 | 2 | 3 | 2 | 19 | 23 | 7 | 0 | 0 | 1 | 1 |
| (Sweden) Linköpings HC | 7 | 2 | 4 | 1 | 19 | 17 | 6 | 1 | 0 | 0 | 0 |
| (Sweden) Djurgårdens IF | 7 | 2 | 4 | 1 | 19 | 21 | 5 | 0 | 1 | 0 | 0 |
| (Finland) HIFK | 7 | 1 | 4 | 2 | 16 | 28 | 4 | 0 | 1 | 0 | 1 |

=== Game log ===
==== Group stage ====
| # | Date | Home | Score | Visitor | Decision | Attendance | Record | Pts | Recap |
| 1 | 14 August | Frölunda | 3–2 | Djurgården | Gistedt | 900 | 1–0–0 | 2 | |
| 2 | 16 August | Frölunda | 4–5 (SO) | Färjestad | Ahonen | 1,886 | 1–0–1 | 3 | |
| 3 | 22 August | Tappara | 2–3 | Frölunda | Gistedt | N/A | 2–0–1 | 5 | |
| 4 | 23 August | HIFK | 2–3 | Frölunda | Ahonen | 1,323 | 3–0–1 | 7 | |
| 5 | 28 August | Frölunda | 3–2 (SO) | Kärpät | Gistedt | 1,035 | 3–0–2 | 9 | |
| 6 | 30 August | Frölunda | 7–5 | TPS | Ahonen | 1,667 | 4–0–2 | 11 | |
| 7 | 4 September | Linköping | 7–2 | Frölunda | Gistedt | 1,210 | 4–1–2 | 11 | |

==== Final ====
| Date | Home | Score | Visitor | Decision | Attendance |
|---|---|---|---|---|---|
| 8 September | Kärpät | 5–2 | Frölunda | Ahonen | 1,124 |

== Elitserien ==
=== Standings ===
| Elitserien | GP | W | L | T | OTW | OTL | GF | GA | Pts |
|---|---|---|---|---|---|---|---|---|---|
| y – HV71 | 55 | 31 | 13 | 11 | 3 | 4 | 178 | 132 | 107 |
| x – Linköpings HC | 55 | 21 | 14 | 20 | 9 | 4 | 166 | 153 | 92 |
| x – Modo Hockey | 55 | 26 | 22 | 7 | 5 | 1 | 153 | 150 | 90 |
| x – Färjestads BK | 55 | 25 | 19 | 11 | 3 | 3 | 169 | 147 | 89 |
| x – Timrå IK | 55 | 23 | 23 | 9 | 5 | 2 | 134 | 136 | 83 |
| x – Frölunda HC | 55 | 23 | 22 | 10 | 3 | 4 | 159 | 157 | 82 |
| x – Djurgårdens IF Hockey | 55 | 21 | 20 | 14 | 2 | 2 | 145 | 139 | 79 |
| x – Skellefteå AIK | 55 | 19 | 20 | 16 | 2 | 6 | 135 | 141 | 75 |
| e – Södertälje SK | 55 | 18 | 24 | 13 | 2 | 4 | 123 | 129 | 69 |
| e – Luleå HF | 55 | 17 | 25 | 13 | 2 | 6 | 139 | 164 | 66 |
| r – Mora IK | 55 | 17 | 25 | 13 | 2 | 4 | 133 | 160 | 66 |
| r – Brynäs IF | 55 | 16 | 30 | 9 | 4 | 2 | 152 | 178 | 61 |

x – clinched playoff spot; y – clinched regular season league title; e – eliminated from playoff contention; r – played in regulation series

=== Game log ===
2007–08 game log

September: 1–2–0 (home: 1–0–0; road: 0–2–0)
| Round | Date | Opponent | Score | Decision | Venue | Attendance | Record | Pts |
| 1 | 24 September | HV71 | 5–6 | Gistedt | Kinnarps Arena | 7,038 | 0–1–0 | 0 |
| 2 | 27 September | Luleå | 2–0 | Ahonen | Scandinavium | 11,898 | 1–1–0 | 3 |
| 3 | 29 September | Skellefteå | 1–3 | Ahonen | Skellefteå Kraft Arena | 5,026 | 1–2–0 | 3 |

October: 7–4–1 (home: 5–1–0; road: 2–3–1)
| Round | Date | Opponent | Score | Decision | Venue | Attendance | Record | Pts |
| 4 | 2 October | Linköping | 4–1 | Ahonen | Scandinavium | 10,818 | 2–2–0 | 6 |
| 5 | 4 October | Djurgården | 0–6 | Ahonen | Hovet | 4,127 | 2–3–0 | 6 |
| 6 | 6 October | Södertälje | 4–2 | Ahonen | Scandinavium | 12,003 | 3–3–0 | 9 |
| 7 | 9 October | Mora | 4–2 | Ahonen | FM Mattsson Arena | 3,622 | 4–3–0 | 12 |
| 8 | 11 October | Modo | 4–2 | Ahonen | Scandinavium | 11,575 | 5–3–0 | 15 |
| 9 | 13 October | Timrå | 2–3 | Gistedt | E.ON Arena | 5,182 | 5–3–1 | 16 |
| 10 | 15 October | Färjestads | 5–0 | Ahonen | Scandinavium | 12,044 | 6–3–1 | 19 |
| 11 | 18 October | Timrå | 2–3 | Ahonen | Scandinavium | 11,097 | 6–4–1 | 19 |
| 12 | 20 October | Brynäs | 5–1 | Ahonen | Läkerol Arena | 7,411 | 7–4–1 | 22 |
| 13 | 23 October | Brynäs | 5–1 | Ahonen | Scandinavium | 11,202 | 8–4–1 | 25 |
| 14 | 25 October | Färjestads | 1–4 | Ahonen | Löfbergs Lila Arena | 8,088 | 8–5–1 | 25 |
| 15 | 30 October | Modo | 1–2 | Ahonen | Swedbank Arena | 7,114 | 8–6–1 | 25 |

November: 3–6–0 (home: 2–3–0; road: 1–3–0)
| Round | Date | Opponent | Score | Decision | Venue | Attendance | Record | Pts |
| 16 | 1 November | Mora | 2–3 | Ahonen | Scandinavium | 12,044 | 8–7–1 | 25 |
| 17 | 3 November | Södertälje | 2–7 | Ahonen | AXA Sports Center | 3,445 | 8–8–1 | 25 |
| 18 | 13 November | Djurgården | 5–4 | Ahonen | Scandinavium | 12,004 | 9–8–1 | 28 |
| 19 | 17 November | Linköping | 2–6 | Gistedt | Cloetta Center | 8,120 | 9–9–1 | 28 |
| 20 | 20 November | Skellefteå | 4–1 | Ahonen | Scandinavium | 11,264 | 10–9–1 | 31 |
| 21 | 22 November | Luleå | 7–1 | Ahonen | Coop Arena | 4,234 | 11–9–1 | 34 |
| 22 | 24 November | HV71 | 2–3 | Ahonen | Scandinavium | 12,044 | 11–10–1 | 34 |
| 23 | 26 November | HV71 | 3–5 | Ahonen | Kinnarps Arena | 7,038 | 11–11–1 | 34 |
| 24 | 29 November | Luleå | 0–6 | Ahonen | Scandinavium | 11,077 | 11–12–1 | 34 |

December: 4–2–2 (home: 3–1–1; road: 2–1–1)
| Round | Date | Opponent | Score | Decision | Venue | Attendance | Record | Pts |
| 25 | 1 December | Modo | 2–1 | Ahonen | Swedbank Arena | 7,206 | 12–12–1 | 37 |
| 26 | 3 December | Djurgården | 2–1 | Ahonen | Scandinavium | 11,144 | 13–12–1 | 40 |
| 27 | 6 December | Timrå | 0–4 | Ahonen | Scandinavium | 11,317 | 13–13–1 | 40 |
| 28 | 8 December | Mora | 3–3 | Ahonen | FM Mattsson Arena | 4,267 | 13–13–2 | 41 |
| 29 | 18 December | Färjestad | 4–0 | Ahonen | Scandinavium | 12,044 | 14–13–2 | 44 |
| 30 | 20 December | Södertälje | 7–0 | Ahonen | AXA Sports Center | 3,452 | 14–14–2 | 44 |
| 31 | 28 December | Brynäs | 4–2 | Ahonen | Scandinavium | 12,044 | 15–14–2 | 47 |
| 32 | 30 December | Linköping | 3–2 | Gistedt | Scandinavium | 11,744 | 15–14–3 | 49 |

January: 3–3–5 (home: 1–1–2; road: 2–2–3)
| Round | Date | Opponent | Score | Decision | Venue | Attendance | Record | Pts |
| 33 | 3 January | Skellefteå | 4–4 | Ahonen | Skellefteå Kraft Arena | 6,001 | 15–14–4 | 50 |
| 34 | 5 January | HV71 | 3–2 | Ahonen | Scandinavium | 12,044 | 15–14–5 | 52 |
| 35 | 7 January | Luleå | 1–3 | Gistedt | Coop Arena | 3,661 | 15–15–5 | 52 |
| 36 | 14 January | Djurgården | 3–0 | Ahonen | Hovet | 6,191 | 16–15–5 | 55 |
| 37 | 17 January | Timrå | 3–4 | Ahonen | E.ON Arena | 4,977 | 16–16–5 | 55 |
| 38 | 19 January | Mora | 2–3 | Gistedt | Scandinavium | 11,628 | 16–17–5 | 55 |
| 39 | 21 January | Modo | 8–2 | Ahonen | Scandinavium | 11,547 | 17–17–5 | 58 |
| 40 | 24 January | Färjestad | 4–5 | Ahonen | Löfbergs Lila Arena | 8,250 | 17–17–6 | 59 |
| 41 | 26 January | Södertälje | 3–4 | Ahonen | Scandinavium | 11,581 | 17–17–7 | 60 |
| 42 | 29 January | Brynäs | 5–3 | Ahonen | Läkerol Arena | 5,329 | 18–17–7 | 63 |
| 43 | 31 January | Linköping | 2–3 | Ahonen | Cloetta Center | 7,105 | 18–17–8 | 64 |

February: 3–4–1 (home: 3–2–0; road: 0–2–0)
| Round | Date | Opponent | Score | Decision | Venue | Attendance | Record | Pts |
| 44 | 2 February | Skellefteå | 4–2 | Ahonen | Scandinavium | 11,638 | 19–17–8 | 67 |
| 45 | 14 February | Skellefteå | 2–4 | Ahonen | Skellefteå Kraft Arena | 5,339 | 19–18–8 | 67 |
| 46 | 16 February | Djurgården | 1–1 | Ahonen | Scandinavium | 12,044 | 19–18–9 | 68 |
| 47 | 18 February | Mora | 1–4 | Gistedt | FM Mattsson Arena | 4,092 | 19–19–9 | 68 |
| 48 | 21 February | Timrå | 4–1 | Ahonen | Scandinavium | 11,829 | 20–19–9 | 71 |
| 49 | 23 February | Brynäs | 4–2 | Ahonen | Läkerol Arena | 7,797 | 21–19–9 | 74 |
| 50 | 26 February | Luleå | 0–3 | Ahonen | Scandinavium | 11,815 | 21–20–9 | 74 |
| 51 | 28 February | Linköping | 3–4 | Ahonen | Cloetta Center | 7,091 | 21–21–9 | 74 |

March: 2–1–1 (home: 1–1–1; road: 1–0–0)
| Round | Date | Opponent | Score | Decision | Venue | Attendance | Record | Pts |
| 52 | 1 March | HV71 | 3–2 | Ahonen | Scandinavium | 12,044 | 21–21–10 | 76 |
| 53 | 4 March | Modo | 5–4 | Ahonen | Swedbank Arena | 6,805 | 22–21–10 | 79 |
| 54 | 6 March | Färjestad | 1–4 | Gistedt | Scandinavium | 12,044 | 22–22–10 | 79 |
| 55 | 8 March | Södertälje | 3–1 | Ahonen | Scandinavium | 11,688 | 23–22–10 | 82 |

Legend: Win (3 points) Overtime win (2 point) Loss (0 points) Overtime loss (1 point) Tie (1 point)

== Playoffs ==
Frölunda ended the 2007–08 regular season as the sixth seed team.

=== Quarterfinals: vs. (4) Färjestad BK ===
Frölunda lost series 3–4

| # | Date | Home | Score | Visitor | Decision | Attendance | Series |
| 1 | 11 March | Frölunda | 3–1 | Färjestad | Ahonen | 7,089 | 1–0 |
| 2 | 13 March | Färjestad | 4–2 | Frölunda | Ahonen | 6,667 | 1–1 |
| 3 | 15 March | Frölunda | 4–0 | Färjestad | Ahonen | 7,812 | 2–1 |
| 4 | 17 March | Färjestad | 4–2 | Frölunda | Ahonen | 7,971 | 2–2 |
| 5 | 18 March | Färjestad | 3–2 | Frölunda | Ahonen | 7,094 | 2–3 |
| 6 | 20 March | Frölunda | 5–4 | Färjestad | Ahonen | 7,572 | 3–3 |
| 7 | 22 March | Färjestad | 3–1 | Frölunda | Ahonen | 8,250 | 3–4 |

== Season stats ==
=== Scoring leaders ===
| No. | Name | Nationality | GP | G | A | Pts | PIM | | GP | G | A | Pts | PIM |
|---|---|---|---|---|---|---|---|---|---|---|---|---|---|
| 24 | Niklas Andersson (LW) | Sweden | 48 | 12 | 37 | 49 | 50 | • | 7 | 2 | 4 | 6 | 12 |
| 71 | Tomi Kallio (RW) | Finland | 54 | 27 | 20 | 47 | 54 | • | 7 | 1 | 4 | 5 | 6 |
| 11 | Magnus Kahnberg (LW) | Sweden | 52 | 16 | 21 | 37 | 30 | • | 7 | 2 | 1 | 3 | 4 |
| 16 | Jonas Nordquist (C) | Sweden | 45 | 9 | 19 | 28 | 37 | • | 7 | 0 | 2 | 2 | 6 |
| 30 | Jonas Johnson (C) | Sweden | 53 | 16 | 11 | 27 | 38 | • | 7 | 4 | 3 | 7 | 6 |
| 81 | Andreas Holmqvist (D) | Sweden | 49 | 3 | 23 | 26 | 40 | • | 4 | 0 | 0 | 0 | 2 |
| 28 | Martin Plüss (C) | Switzerland | 50 | 16 | 9 | 25 | 32 | • | 6 | 2 | 0 | 2 | 4 |
| 12 | Karl Fabricius (LW) | Sweden | 55 | 12 | 12 | 24 | 22 | • | 7 | 2 | 1 | 3 | 0 |
| 26 | Toni Söderholm (D) | Finland | 53 | 6 | 14 | 20 | 66 | • | 7 | 0 | 2 | 2 | 0 |
| 23 | Ronnie Sundin (D) | Sweden | 54 | 3 | 15 | 18 | 64 | • | 7 | 0 | 1 | 1 | 12 |
| 18 | Steve Kariya (RW) | Canada | 41 | 1 | 17 | 18 | 18 | • | 0 | 0 | 0 | 0 | 0 |
| 17 | Michael Holmqvist (C) | Sweden | 53 | 7 | 10 | 17 | 51 | • | 4 | 0 | 0 | 0 | 2 |
| 21 | Mikael Johansson (C) | Sweden | 55 | 6 | 9 | 15 | 34 | • | 7 | 2 | 1 | 3 | 0 |
| 10 | Fredrik Pettersson (RW) | Sweden | 53 | 6 | 7 | 13 | 38 | • | 7 | 2 | 1 | 3 | 6 |
| 22 | Jonas Esbjörs (LW) | Sweden | 52 | 5 | 6 | 11 | 40 | • | 0 | 0 | 0 | 0 | 0 |
| 20 | Tuukka Mäntylä (D) | Finland | 45 | 1 | 10 | 11 | 46 | • | 7 | 0 | 3 | 3 | 4 |
| 25 | Oscar Ackeström (D) | Sweden | 47 | 4 | 5 | 9 | 83 | • | 7 | 0 | 3 | 3 | 10 |
| 44 | Jonas Ahnelöv (D) | Sweden | 51 | 3 | 4 | 7 | 30 | • | 6 | 0 | 0 | 0 | 0 |
| 7 | Antti-Jussi Niemi (D) | Finland | 54 | 1 | 4 | 5 | 79 | • | 7 | 1 | 1 | 2 | 35 |
| 15 | Justin Morrison (RW) | United States | 11 | 1 | 3 | 4 | 6 | • | 0 | 0 | 0 | 0 | 0 |
| 32 | Johan Andersson (LW) | Sweden | 49 | 2 | 1 | 3 | 14 | • | 7 | 0 | 1 | 1 | 4 |
| 8 | Lars Eller (C) | Denmark | 14 | 0 | 2 | 2 | 4 | • | 7 | 0 | 1 | 1 | 2 |
| 65 | Erik Karlsson (D) | Sweden | 7 | 1 | 0 | 1 | 0 | • | 6 | 0 | 0 | 0 | 0 |
| 55 | Joakim Andersson (C) | Sweden | 9 | 1 | 0 | 1 | 2 | • | 4 | 1 | 1 | 2 | 0 |
| 33 | Ossi-Petteri Grönholm (D) | Finland | 11 | 0 | 1 | 1 | 12 | • | 5 | 0 | 1 | 1 | 6 |
| 3 | Philip Larsen (D) | Denmark | 16 | 0 | 0 | 0 | 2 | • | 0 | 0 | 0 | 0 | 0 |
| 51 | Nicklas Lasu (LW) | Sweden | 2 | 0 | 0 | 0 | 0 | • | 0 | 0 | 0 | 0 | 0 |
| 42 | Simon Hjalmarsson (LW) | Sweden | 1 | 0 | 0 | 0 | 2 | • | 0 | 0 | 0 | 0 | 0 |
| 51 | Anton Gustafsson (C) | Sweden | 1 | 0 | 0 | 0 | 0 | • | 0 | 0 | 0 | 0 | 0 |
| 51 | Peter Andersson (D) | Sweden | 1 | 0 | 0 | 0 | 0 | • | 0 | 0 | 0 | 0 | 0 |
| | | | Regular season | | | | | | Playoffs | | | | |

== Transactions ==
| Player | Former team |
| Johan Andersson | Växjö Lakers |
| Tuukka Mäntylä | Tappara |
| Robin Rahm | Sunne IK |
| Toni Söderholm | SC Bern |
| Ari Ahonen | Jokerit |
| Andreas Holmqvist | Linköpings HC |
| Jonas Nordquist | Norfolk Admirals |
| Fredrik Pettersson | Calgary Hitmen |
| Justin Morrison | Modo Hockey |
| Michael Holmqvist | Chicago Blackhawks |

| Player | New team |
| Jan-Axel Alavaara | Kloten Flyers |
| Tommy Salo | Retirement |
| Arto Tukio | Ilves |
| Anton Axelsson | Timrå IK |
| Henrik Malmström | Ilves |
| Ari Vallin | Lokomotiv Yaroslavl |
| Markus Seikola | HPK |
| Johan Ryno | Detroit Red Wings |
| Sean Bergenheim | New York Islanders |

== Drafted players ==
Frölunda HC players picked at the 2008 NHL entry draft in Ottawa, Ontario, Canada, in June 2008.

| | Player | Nationality | Drafted by | Round | Overall |
|---|---|---|---|---|---|
| D | Erik Karlsson | Sweden | Ottawa Senators | 1st | 15th |
| C | Anton Gustafsson | Sweden | Washington Capitals | 1st | 21st |
| RW | Nicklas Lasu | Sweden | Atlanta Thrashers | 5th | 124th |
| D | Philip Larsen | Denmark | Dallas Stars | 5th | 149th |
