= Johan Fransson =

Swedish ice hockey player (born 1985)

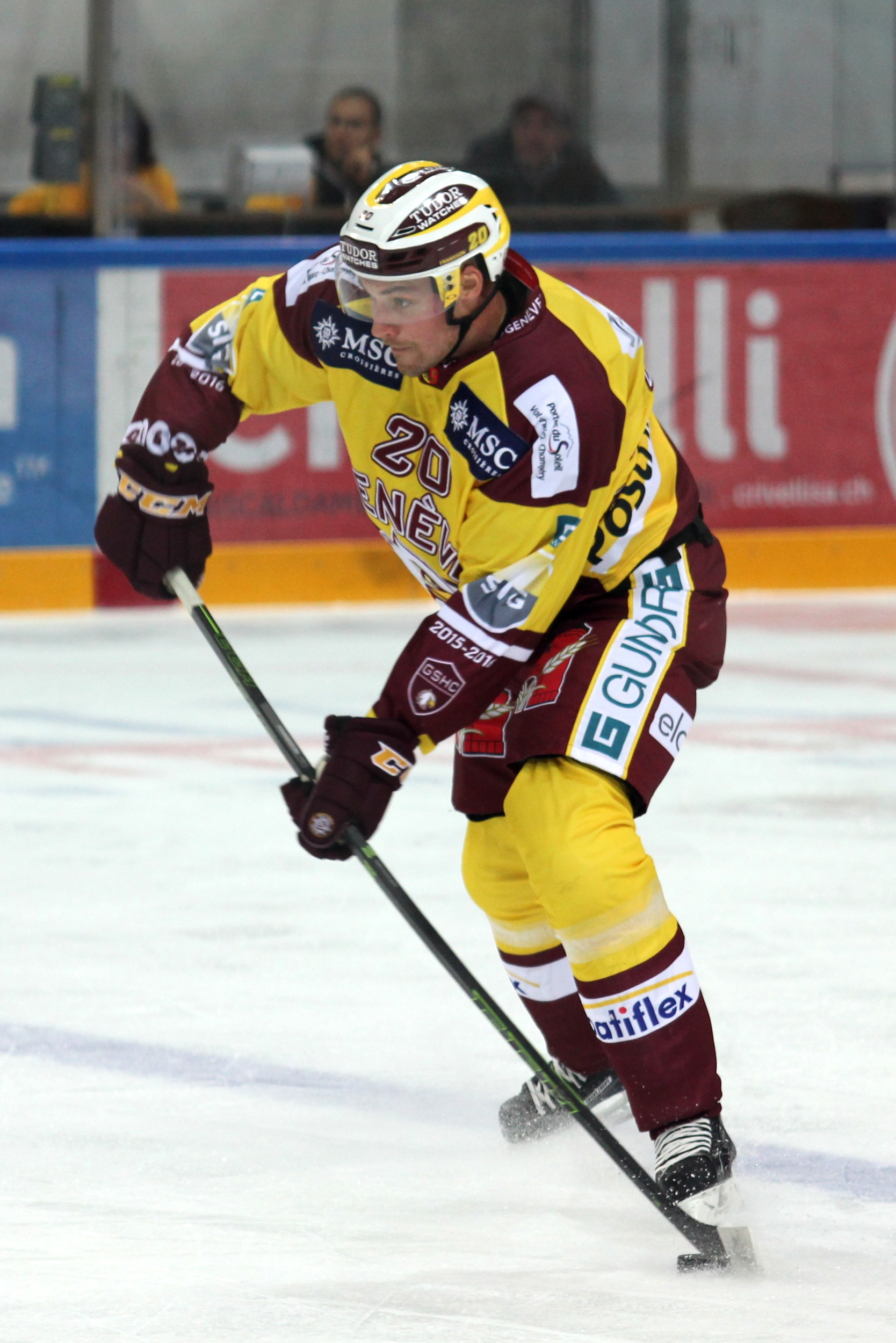
- Born: February 18, 1985 (age 41) Kalix, Sweden
- Height: 6 ft 2 in (188 cm)
- Weight: 198 lb (90 kg; 14 st 2 lb)
- Position: Defence
- Shot: Left
- Played for: Luleå HF; Frölunda HC; Ässät; Linköpings HC; HC Lugano; SKA Saint Petersburg; Rapperswil-Jona Lakers; Genève-Servette HC; Leksands IF
- National team: Sweden
- NHL draft: 34th overall, 2004; Dallas Stars
- Playing career: 2002–2021

Johan Fransson (born February 18, 1985) is a Swedish former professional ice hockey player, who last played for Leksands IF in the Swedish Hockey League (SHL), where he was a defenceman. He also played in leagues in Finland, Switzerland, and Russia. Although he was drafted and traded as a prospect in the NHL three times, he has never played a regular season NHL game.

== Playing career ==
Fransson played bandy in Kalix; his team won the Swedish championship for 13-year-olds in 1998. He attributes his skating ability to his bandy background. In the 2000–01 season, he represented Norrbotten in the TV-pucken tournament, and played for Kalix HF in Division 1 (Sweden's third highest level). For the 2001–02 season, Fransson played for Luleå HF in the J20 SuperElit junior hockey league.

For the 2002–03 season, Fransson made his Elitserien debut for Luleå HF, but only played three games because of a groin injury. For the 2003–04 season, he returned to the Luleå' roster, and was nominated for Elitserien Rookie of the Year. In his first playoff game, Fransson suffered a concussion after being checked by Färjestads BK's Peter Nordström. He returned to play one game in the series, but his team was eliminated from the playoffs. He was praised as having a bright future. His 2004–05 season was not as strong as his rookie year, and in the following season, he struggled, and the team did not re-sign him. He and his fellow Luleå teammate Karl Fabricius signed with Frölunda HC. He began the 2006–07 season well despite his team struggling. After Per Bäckman replaced Stephan Lundh as coach, Fransson saw less ice time, and was eventually loaned to Ässät, in the SM-liiga league in Finland.

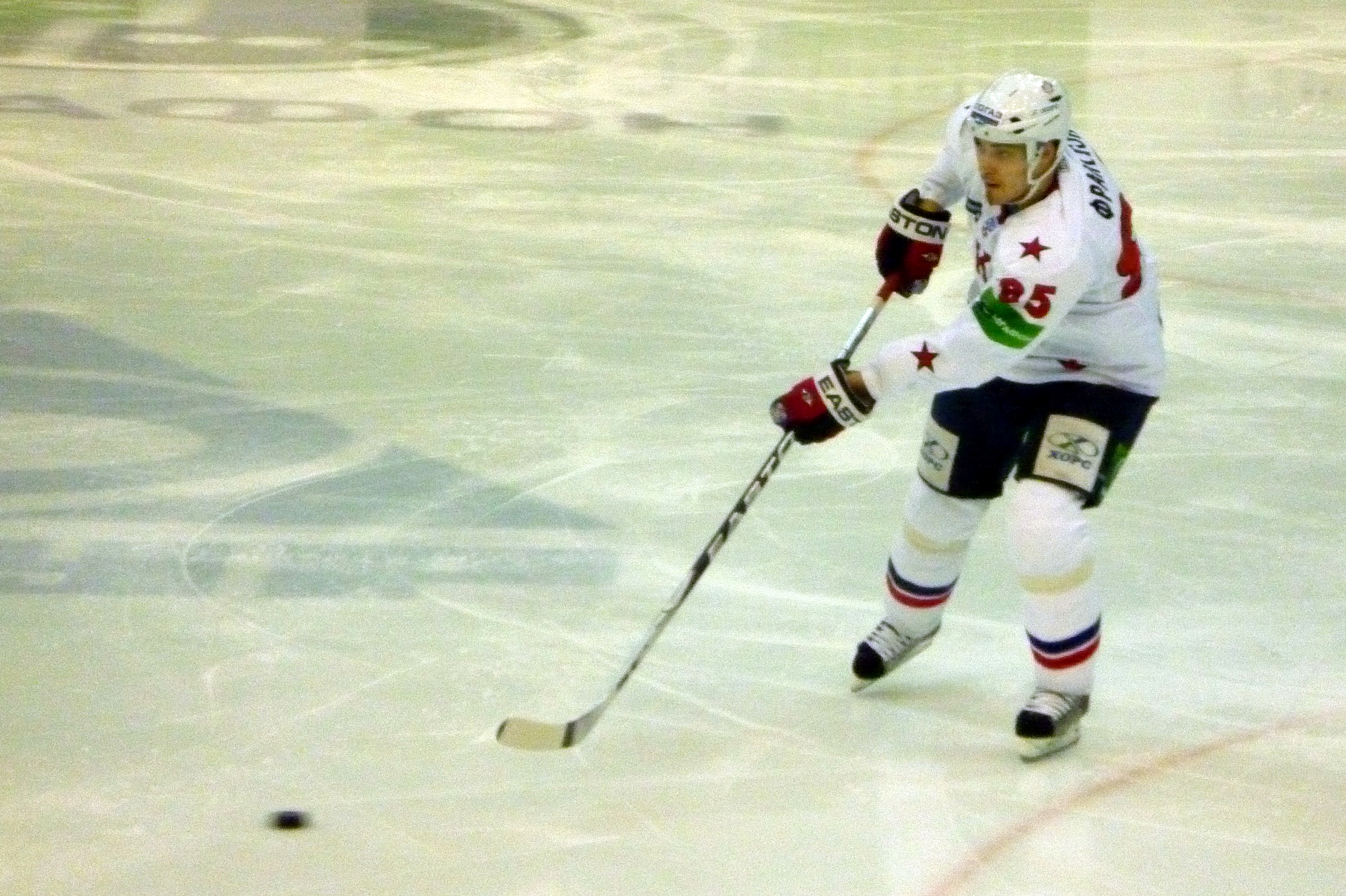
Fransson during his tenure with SKA.

In 2007, Fransson was traded to Linköpings HC for Oscar Ackeström. Although he only played eight regular season games and 15 playoff games without scoring a point, his new team reached the Swedish Championship finals, where they lost to Modo Hockey. For the 2007–08 season he played 48 games, scoring a career high five goals and fourteen points. He also made his debut for Tre Kronor. Fransson helped Linköping reach the Swedish Championship finals for the second year in a row; the team blew a 2–0 series lead, and eventually lost to HV71 2–4. For the 2008–09 season, Fransson did not sustain his success; he was released in January, and signed with HC Lugano of the Swiss National League A, where he scored two goals and logged five points in seven regular games, and two goals in four playoff games.

Fransson returned to Luleå for the 2009–10 season, amidst some criticism over his past performance, but by mid-December, he had achieved his career best in goals and points. At the end of the season, he had played 54 games, logging 30 points and 11 goals. He was offered a five-year contract to play for Luleå, but shortly afterward, he used a contract clause to sign with the HC Dinamo Minsk of the Kontinental Hockey League (KHL) in Russia, and a few weeks later Fransson signed his third contract of the off-season with the Los Angeles Kings of the National Hockey League (NHL).

On October 13, 2010, Fransson was loaned by the Kings to SKA St. Petersburg in Russia. where he played the rest of the 2010–11 season.

On August 3, 2011, he rejoined Luleå HF, where he stayed until the remainder of the 2013-14 season. He then headed to Switzerland, signing with the Rapperswil-Jona Lakers of the top-flight National League A (NLA) for 2014-15, before moving on to fellow NLA team Genève-Servette HC for 2015–16. His tenure with Geneva ended at the conclusion of the 2019 playoffs. Fransson played 154 regular season games with Geneva, putting up 74 points, and 25 playoffs games (9 points) over 4 seasons.

As a free agent, Fransson returned to his homeland and the SHL, agreeing to a four-year contract with newly promoted Leksands IF on April 29, 2019.

== Career statistics ==
=== Regular season and playoffs ===
			Regular season					Playoffs
Season	Team	League	GP	G	A	Pts	PIM	GP	G	A	Pts	PIM
2000–01	Kalix HF	SWE.3	19	0	6	6	8	—	—	—	—	—
2001–02	Luleå HF	J18 Allsv	5	2	0	2	0	3	0	0	0	0
2001–02	Luleå HF	J20	29	4	4	8	28	2	0	0	0	4
2002–03	Luleå HF	J18 Allsv	2	0	0	0	2	—	—	—	—	—
2002–03	Luleå HF	J20	22	2	4	6	65	—	—	—	—	—
2002–03	Luleå HF	SEL	3	0	0	0	0	—	—	—	—	—
2003–04	Luleå HF	J20	5	0	2	2	10	—	—	—	—	—
2003–04	Lulea HF	SEL	44	3	3	6	28	2	0	0	0	4
2004–05	Luleå HF	J20	1	1	1	2	0	7	1	2	3	4
2004–05	Luleå HF	SEL	43	1	6	7	30	3	0	0	0	0
2005–06	Luleå HF	SEL	50	3	5	8	74	6	1	1	2	6
2006–07	Frölunda HC	SEL	35	0	6	6	18	—	—	—	—	—
2006–07	Ässät	SM-l	6	0	1	1	2	—	—	—	—	—
2006–07	Linköpings HC	SEL	8	0	0	0	4	15	0	0	0	2
2007–08	Linköpings HC	SEL	48	5	9	14	24	16	0	5	5	16
2008–09	Linköpings HC	SEL	40	3	7	10	24	—	—	—	—	—
2008–09	HC Lugano	NLA	7	2	3	5	2	4	2	0	2	0
2009–10	Luleå HF	SEL	54	11	19	30	26	—	—	—	—	—
2010–11	SKA Saint Petersburg	KHL	38	6	10	16	22	10	0	2	2	2
2011–12	Luleå HF	SEL	48	1	19	20	12	5	1	1	2	2
2012–13	Luleå HF	SEL	55	3	8	11	12	15	0	10	10	6
2013–14	Luleå HF	SHL	38	5	10	15	20	2	0	0	0	2
2014–15	Rapperswil–Jona Lakers	NLA	32	4	16	20	22	—	—	—	—	—
2015–16	Genève–Servette HC	NLA	39	7	15	22	12	11	0	1	1	18
2016–17	Genève–Servette HC	NLA	45	5	10	15	52	4	0	3	3	0
2017–18	Genève–Servette HC	NL	40	0	19	19	38	4	1	0	1	4
2018–19	Genève–Servette HC	NL	30	6	12	18	14	6	1	3	4	2
2019–20	Leksands IF	SHL	41	3	8	11	14	—	—	—	—	—
2020–21	Leksands IF	SHL	22	1	4	5	8	2	0	0	0	0
SHL totals			529	39	104	143	304	66	2	17	19	38
NL totals			193	24	75	99	140	36	4	9	13	36

Medal record

Ice hockey

Representing Sweden

World Championships
Gold medal – first place	2013 Sweden/Finland	
Bronze medal – third place	2014 Belarus	

=== International ===
Year	Team	Event	Result	GP	G	A	Pts	PIM
2004	Sweden	WJC	7th	6	3	0	3	2
2005	Sweden	WJC	6th	6	0	0	0	12
2013	Sweden	WC	1st place, gold medalist(s)	10	1	4	5	4
2014	Sweden	WC	3rd place, bronze medalist(s)	10	0	0	0	4
2016	Sweden	WC	6th	7	0	3	3	2
2018	Sweden	OG	5th	4	0	2	2	2
Junior totals				12	3	0	3	14
Senior totals				31	1	9	10	12
