= List of Frölunda HC players selected in the NHL entry draft =

Henrik Lundqvist, drafted in the 2000 NHL entry draft, 7th round, 205th overall by the New York Rangers.

This is a list of drafted Frölunda HC players, players who have been drafted in the National Hockey League (NHL) Entry Draft and played the season prior to the draft for the Frölunda ice hockey organization. There have been 98 players drafted in the NHL Entry Draft from the Frölunda organization. Most of the players on this list were drafted from Frölunda's junior team which is the most successful junior team in Sweden, having won more Anton Cups (10) than any other team.

Sixteen Frölunda players have been selected in the first round of the NHL Entry Draft. The highest draft selection was Rasmus Dahlin, who was drafted first overall in the 2018 NHL entry draft. The most-recent first-round selection were Otto Stenberg, 25th overall, and David Edstrom 32nd overall, in the 2023 NHL entry draft. Six players drafted from Frölunda have played over 1,000 regular season games in the NHL; Calle Johansson, Daniel Alfredsson, Alexander Steen, Loui Eriksson, Lars Eller, and Erik Karlsson. Three players have won individual awards at the annual NHL Awards Ceremony; Daniel Alfredsson who won the Calder Memorial Trophy as the NHL Rookie of the Year in 1996, the King Clancy Memorial Trophy for leadership qualities and humanitarian contribution in his community in 2012, and the Mark Messier Leadership Award in 2013 as a superior leader and a contributing member of society. Henrik Lundqvist who won the Vezina Trophy in 2012 as the league's top goaltender. And Erik Karlsson who became the second youngest player to win the James Norris Memorial Trophy, awarded to the NHL's best defenceman, in 2012, and won the trophy again in 2015 and 2023.

Two players were drafted as overage players, having played several seasons at a professional level: Ronnie Sundin, drafted by the New York Rangers in the 1996 NHL entry draft at age 26, and Jonas Johnson, drafted by the St. Louis Blues in the 2002 NHL entry draft at age 32. Six pair of siblings have been drafted: brothers Mikael & Niklas Andersson, Carl & John Klingberg, Erik & Anton Karlsson, Liam & Noah Dower Nilsson, as well as two sets of twins, Joel & Henrik Lundqvist and Fred & John Wikner. Two sets of father and son have been drafted, Ronnie Sundin in 1996 and his son Albin in 2024, and Jonas Johnson in 2002 and his son Andreas in 2013.

== Drafted players ==
	Player	Nationality	Drafted by	Year	Round	Overall
D	Robert Nordmark	Sweden	Detroit Red Wings	1981	10th	191st
RW	Mikael Andersson	Sweden	Buffalo Sabres	1984	1st	18th
D	Stefan Larsson	Sweden	Detroit Red Wings	1984	7th	133rd
D	Calle Johansson	Sweden	Buffalo Sabres	1985	1st	14th
RW	Thomas Sjögren	Sweden	Washington Capitals	1987	8th	162nd
RW	Patrik Carnbäck	Sweden	Montreal Canadiens	1988	6th	125th
LW	Niklas Andersson	Sweden	Quebec Nordiques	1989	4th	68th
D	Joakim Esbjörs	Sweden	Hartford Whalers	1992	11th	249th
RW	Daniel Alfredsson	Sweden	Ottawa Senators	1994	6th	113th
RW	Peter Ström	Sweden	Montreal Canadiens	1994	8th	200th
RW	Peter Högardh	Sweden	New York Islanders	1994	8th	203rd
LW	Per-Johan Axelsson	Sweden	Boston Bruins	1995	7th	177th
D	Ronnie Sundin	Sweden	New York Rangers	1996	9th	237th
D	Christian Bäckman	Sweden	St. Louis Blues	1998	1st	24th
LW	Jari Tolsa	Sweden	Detroit Red Wings	1999	4th	120th
LW	David Nyström	Sweden	Philadelphia Flyers	1999	8th	224th
C	Joel Lundqvist	Sweden	Dallas Stars	2000	3rd	68th
G	Henrik Lundqvist	Sweden	New York Rangers	2000	7th	205th
C	Tim Eriksson	Sweden	Los Angeles Kings	2000	7th	206th
RW	Magnus Kahnberg	Sweden	Carolina Hurricanes	2000	7th	212th
RW	Fredrik Sjöström	Sweden	Phoenix Coyotes	2001	1st	11th
LW	Jens Karlsson	Sweden	Los Angeles Kings	2001	1st	18th
D	Mikael Svensk	Sweden	Edmonton Oilers	2001	6th	185th
C	Alexander Steen	Sweden	Toronto Maple Leafs	2002	1st	24th
C	Jonas Johnson	Sweden	St. Louis Blues	2002	7th	221st
C	Fredrik Johansson	Sweden	Edmonton Oilers	2002	9th	274th
LW	Loui Eriksson	Sweden	Dallas Stars	2003	2nd	33rd
RW	Kalle Olsson	Sweden	Edmonton Oilers	2003	5th	147th
D	Richard Demen-Willaume	Sweden	Colorado Avalanche	2004	5th	154th
RW	Fred Wikner	Sweden	Calgary Flames	2004	6th	182nd
LW	Anton Axelsson	Sweden	Detroit Red Wings	2004	6th	192nd
LW	John Wikner	Sweden	Ottawa Senators	2004	9th	284th
RW	Morten Madsen	Denmark	Minnesota Wild	2005	4th	122nd
LW	Fredrik Pettersson	Sweden	Edmonton Oilers	2005	5th	157th
C	Kirill Starkov	Russia	Columbus Blue Jackets	2005	6th	189th
RW	Robin Figren	Sweden	New York Islanders	2006	3rd	70th
D	Jonas Ahnelöv	Sweden	Phoenix Coyotes	2006	3rd	88th
LW	Viktor Stålberg	Sweden	Toronto Maple Leafs	2006	6th	161st
C	Lars Eller	Denmark	St. Louis Blues	2007	1st	13th
G	Joel Gistedt	Sweden	Phoenix Coyotes	2007	2nd	36th
LW	Simon Hjalmarsson	Sweden	St. Louis Blues	2007	2nd	39th
C	Joakim Andersson	Sweden	Detroit Red Wings	2007	3rd	88th
D	Jens Hellgren	Sweden	Colorado Avalanche	2007	6th	155th
D	Erik Karlsson	Sweden	Ottawa Senators	2008	1st	15th
C	Anton Gustafsson	Sweden	Washington Capitals	2008	1st	21st
RW	Nicklas Lasu	Sweden	Atlanta Thrashers	2008	5th	124th
D	Philip Larsen	Denmark	Dallas Stars	2008	5th	149th
RW	Carl Klingberg	Sweden	Atlanta Thrashers	2009	2nd	34th
G	Robin Lehner	Sweden	Ottawa Senators	2009	2nd	46th
D	Peter Andersson	Sweden	Vancouver Canucks	2009	5th	143rd
D	John Klingberg	Sweden	Dallas Stars	2010	5th	131st
C	Johan Sundström	Sweden	New York Islanders	2011	2nd	50th
LW	Michael Schumacher	Sweden	Los Angeles Kings	2011	7th	200th
D	Henrik Tömmernes	Sweden	Vancouver Canucks	2011	7th	210th
RW	Sebastian Collberg	Sweden	Montreal Canadiens	2012	2nd	33rd
G	Frederik Andersen	Denmark	Anaheim Ducks	2012	3rd	87th
C	Erik Karlsson	Sweden	Carolina Hurricanes	2012	4th	99th
G	Fredrik Bergvik	Sweden	San Jose Sharks	2013	4th	117th
RW	Markus Søberg	Norway	Columbus Blue Jackets	2013	6th	165th
LW	Anton Blidh	Sweden	Boston Bruins	2013	6th	180th
LW	Andreas Johnson	Sweden	Toronto Maple Leafs	2013	7th	202nd
D	Julius Bergman	Sweden	San Jose Sharks	2014	2nd	46th
RW	Anton Karlsson	Sweden	Arizona Coyotes	2014	3rd	87th
D	William Lagesson	Sweden	Edmonton Oilers	2014	4th	91st
C	Christoffer Ehn	Sweden	Detroit Red Wings	2014	4th	106th
D	John Nyberg	Sweden	Dallas Stars	2014	6th	165th
G	Hugo Fagerblom	Sweden	Florida Panthers	2014	7th	182th
LW	Pierre Engvall	Sweden	Toronto Maple Leafs	2014	7th	188th
RW	Kevin Elgestål	Sweden	Washington Capitals	2014	7th	194th
D	Jacob Larsson	Sweden	Anaheim Ducks	2015	1st	27th
RW	John Dahlström	Sweden	Chicago Blackhawks	2015	7th	211th
RW	Kristian Vesalainen	Finland	Winnipeg Jets	2017	1st	24th
D	Filip Westerlund	Sweden	Arizona Coyotes	2017	2nd	44th
C	Joni Ikonen	Finland	Montreal Canadiens	2017	2nd	58th
C	Jacob Peterson	Sweden	Dallas Stars	2017	5th	132nd
D	Kristoffer Gunnarsson	Sweden	Vancouver Canucks	2017	5th	135th
D	Rasmus Dahlin	Sweden	Buffalo Sabres	2018	1st	1st
LW	Samuel Fagemo	Sweden	Los Angeles Kings	2019	2nd	50th
C	Karl Henriksson	Sweden	New York Rangers	2019	2nd	58th
G	Erik Portillo	Sweden	Buffalo Sabres	2019	3rd	67th
RW	Elmer Söderblom	Sweden	Detroit Red Wings	2019	6th	159th
D	Gustav Berglund	Sweden	Detroit Red Wings	2019	6th	177th
RW	Lucas Raymond	Sweden	Detroit Red Wings	2020	1st	4th
LW	Daniel Torgersson	Sweden	Winnipeg Jets	2020	2nd	40th
C	Theodor Niederbach	Sweden	Detroit Red Wings	2020	2nd	51st
D	Simon Edvinsson	Sweden	Detroit Red Wings	2021	1st	6th
C	Liam Dower Nilsson	Sweden	Detroit Red Wings	2021	5th	134th
D	Hugo Gabrielson	Sweden	Vancouver Canucks	2021	6th	169th
LW	Ludwig Persson	Sweden	Washington Capitals	2022	3rd	85th
RW	Joel Ratkovic Berndtsson	Sweden	Buffalo Sabres	2022	7th	202nd
C	Otto Stenberg	Sweden	St. Louis Blues	2023	1st	25th
C	David Edstrom	Sweden	Vegas Golden Knights	2023	1st	32nd
C	Noah Dower Nilsson	Sweden	Detroit Red Wings	2023	3rd	73rd
D	Kristian Kostadinski	Sweden	Boston Bruins	2023	7th	220th
LW	Viktor Nörringer	Sweden	Nashville Predators	2024	4th	127th
D	Albin Sundin	Sweden	Edmonton Oilers	2024	6th	183rd
LW	Mads Kongsbak Klyvø	Denmark	Florida Panthers	2025	4th	112th
LW	Max Westergård	Finland	Philadelphia Flyers	2025	5th	132nd
