= Jonatan Johansson =

Jonatan or Jonathan Johansson is the name of:

- Jonatan Johansson (footballer) (born 1975), Finnish football player and coach
- Jonatan Johansson (snowboarder) (1980–2006), Swedish snowboarder
- Jonathan Johansson (musician) (born 1980), Swedish musician
- Jonathan Johansson (ice hockey) (born 1991), Swedish ice hockey player
