= Hans Andersson =

Hans Andersson may refer to:

- H. Johan Andersson (born 1984), Swedish ice hockey player for Växjö and Frölunda
- Hans Andersson-Tvilling (born 1928), Swedish football and ice hockey player for Djurgården
- Hans Andersson (footballer), Swedish footballer
