= Albin Sundin =

Swedish ice hockey player (born 2004)

- Born: 13 August 2004 (age 20); Kungsbacka, Sweden
- Height: 6 ft 2 in (188 cm)
- Weight: 198 lb (90 kg; 14 st 2 lb)
- Position: Defence
- Shoots: Right
- SHL team Former teams: Timrå IK; Frölunda HC
- NHL draft: 183rd overall, 2024; Edmonton Oilers
- Playing career: 2023–present

Albin Sundin (born August 13, 2004) is a Swedish professional ice hockey defenceman for Timrå IK of the Swedish Hockey League (SHL). He was selected 183rd overall by the Edmonton Oilers in the 2024 NHL entry draft.

== Playing career ==
Sundin represented Gothenburg at the 2019 TV-pucken. He joined the junior club of Frölunda HC for the 2020–21 season. He made his senior debut for Frölunda on January 7, 2023, in a sold out 5–2 win over Luleå HF at Scandinavium.

Sundin was selected 183rd overall by the Edmonton Oilers in the 2024 NHL entry draft, becoming the 96th player selected from Frölunda in an NHL draft.

On 26 April 2025, Sundin left Frölunda at the conclusion of his contract having played three seasons with the club, and was signed to a two-year deal with fellow SHL outfit, Timrå IK.

== Personal life ==
Albin's father, Ronnie, is a retired professional ice hockey player who won two Swedish Championships with Frölunda HC, and gold at the 2006 Winter Olympics and the 2006 Ice Hockey World Championships representing team Sweden.

== Career statistics ==
			Regular season					Playoffs
Season	Team	League	GP	G	A	Pts	PIM	GP	G	A	Pts	PIM
2021–22	Frölunda HC	J20	33	5	7	12	10	3	1	1	2	0
2022–23	Frölunda HC	J20	36	6	15	21	20	2	0	0	0	4
2022–23	Frölunda HC	SHL	10	0	0	0	2	—	—	—	—	—
2023–24	Frölunda HC	J20	41	4	13	17	59	4	2	1	3	4
2023–24	Frölunda HC	SHL	18	0	1	1	4	14	1	1	2	2
2023–24	Borås HC	Div.1	5	0	1	1	4	—	—	—	—	—
2024–25	Frölunda HC	SHL	25	0	0	0	6	6	0	0	0	0
2024–25	AIK IF	Allsv	17	1	8	9	6	—	—	—	—	—
SHL totals			53	0	1	1	12	20	1	1	2	2
