= Mikko Lehtonen (ice hockey, born 1978) =

Finnish ice hockey player

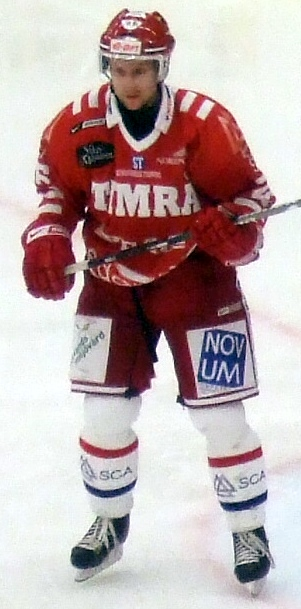
- Lehtonen with Timrå IK in 2008
- Born: 12 June 1978 (age 47) Kiiminki, Finland
- Height: 6 ft 0 in (183 cm)
- Weight: 209 lb (95 kg; 14 st 13 lb)
- Position: Defence
- Shot: Left
- Played for: Nashville Predators; Timrå IK; Frölunda HC; Färjestads BK; Kärpät
- National team: Finland
- NHL draft: 271st overall, 2001; Nashville Predators
- Playing career: 1999–2014

Mikko Tapani Lehtonen (born 12 June 1978) is a Finnish former ice hockey defenceman. He played 15 games in the National Hockey League with the Nashville Predators during the 2006–07 season. The rest of his career, which lasted from 1999 to 2014, was mainly spent with Kärpät in the Finnish SM-liiga. Internationally Lehtonen played for the Finnish national team at the 2006 and 2009 World Championships, winning a bronze in 2006.

== Playing career ==
Lehtonen appeared in his first National Hockey League game on 7 October 2006 with the Nashville Predators against the Minnesota Wild, and registered his first NHL goal in that game. The goal was scored eight seconds into his first NHL shift, coming one second short of tying the all-time record set by Dave Christian.

On 27 February 2007, Lehtonen was traded to the Buffalo Sabres for a fourth-round pick in the 2007 NHL entry draft.

Having won the Finnish Championship for a third time playing for Oulun Kärpät, Lehtonen signed a one-year deal with Swedish team Timrå IK on 9 June 2008.

On 6 May 2009, Lehtonen signed with Frölunda HC for the 2009–10 Frölunda HC season.

== Career statistics ==
=== Regular season and playoffs ===
			Regular season					Playoffs
Season	Team	League	GP	G	A	Pts	PIM	GP	G	A	Pts	PIM
1993–94	Kärpät U16	FIN U16	31	2	9	11	26	4	0	2	2	4
1994–95	Kärpät U16	FIN U16	29	4	10	14	78	—	—	—	—	—
1995–96	Kärpät U18	FIN U18	15	4	5	9	30	—	—	—	—	—
1996–97	Kärpät U20	FIN U20	35	6	19	25	82	—	—	—	—	—
1997–98	Kärpät U20	FIN U20	20	3	4	7	40	—	—	—	—	—
1998–99	Kärpät U20	FIN U20	22	7	8	15	51	—	—	—	—	—
1998–99	Kärpät	FIN-2	2	0	0	0	0	—	—	—	—	—
1999–00	Kärpät	FIN-2	45	5	10	15	26	—	—	—	—	—
2000–01	Kärpät	FIN	54	6	9	15	58	9	0	3	3	4
2001–02	Kärpät	FIN	55	8	11	19	32	4	1	1	2	4
2002–03	Kärpät	FIN	55	5	12	17	50	15	3	1	4	22
2003–04	Kärpät	FIN	53	5	13	18	62	12	2	4	6	8
2004–05	Kärpät	FIN	53	11	17	28	28	12	3	3	6	12
2005–06	Kärpät	FIN	43	6	8	14	46	10	2	2	4	12
2006–07	Nashville Predators	NHL	15	1	2	3	8	—	—	—	—	—
2006–07	Milwaukee Admirals	AHL	35	4	8	12	28	—	—	—	—	—
2006–07	Rochester Americans	AHL	21	1	8	9	10	—	—	—	—	—
2007–08	Kärpät	FIN	48	8	25	33	34	15	4	5	9	12
2008–09	Timrå IK	SWE	41	15	15	30	58	7	0	2	2	0
2009–10	Frölunda HC	SWE	9	3	1	4	10	—	—	—	—	—
2009–10	Kärpät	FIN	11	3	2	5	16	10	1	2	3	8
2010–11	Kärpät	FIN	43	12	9	21	46	2	0	2	2	4
2011–12	Kärpät	FIN	37	6	8	14	14	7	2	2	4	4
2012–13	Kärpät	FIN	40	6	14	20	38	—	—	—	—	—
2013–14	Kärpät	FIN	26	6	6	12	14	—	—	—	—	—
FIN totals			518	82	134	216	438	96	18	25	43	90
NHL totals			15	1	2	3	8	—	—	—	—	—

=== International ===
Year	Team	Event	GP	G	A	Pts	PIM
2006	Finland	WC	9	1	4	5	14
2009	Finland	WC	7	1	0	1	6
Senior totals			16	2	4	6	20
