= Sebastian Idoff =

Swedish ice hockey player

- Born: December 2, 1990 (age 34); Malmö, Sweden
- Height: 5 ft 10.5 in (179 cm)
- Weight: 181 lb (82 kg; 12 st 13 lb)
- Position: Goaltender
- Catches: Left
- GET team Former teams: Lørenskog; Frölunda HC; Kungälvs IK; Borås HC; Södertälje SK; IF Troja/Ljungby; Asplöven HC; Diables Rouges de Briançon; Manglerud Star
- Playing career: 2008–present

Sebastian Idoff (born December 2, 1990) is a Swedish professional ice hockey goaltender, currently playing for Lørenskog of the Norwegian GET-ligaen.

== Career statistics ==
=== Regular season and playoffs ===
			Regular Season						Playoffs
Season	Team	League	GP	Min	GA	GAA	SVS%	SO	GP	Min	GA	GAA	SVS%	SO
2006–07	Frölunda HC	J20	2	120:00	9	4,50	85,00	0	—	—	—	—	—	—
2007–08	Frölunda HC	J20	4	242:53	7	1,73	92,05	0	—	—	—	—	—	—
2007–08	Örebro HK	J20	14	839:40	50	3,57	90,44	0	—	—	—	—	—	—
2008–09	Frölunda HC	J20	18	1046:51	42	2,41	91,57	3	—	—	—	—	—	—
2008–09	Borås HC	Allsv	14	846:14	38	2,69	90,10	0	—	—	—	—	—	—
J20 Totals			38	2249:24	108	2.88	90,76	3	—	—	—	—	—	—
