= Johan Alm (ice hockey) =

Swedish ice hockey player (born 1992)

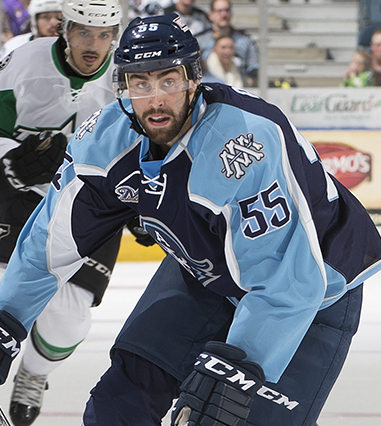
- Alm in 2015
- Born: January 28, 1992 (age 34) Skellefteå, Sweden
- Height: 6 ft 3 in (191 cm)
- Weight: 209 lb (95 kg; 14 st 13 lb)
- Position: Defence
- Shot: Left
- Played for: Frölunda HC; Skellefteå AIK; Milwaukee Admirals; IK Oskarshamn
- NHL draft: Undrafted
- Playing career: 2010–2023

Johan Alm (born January 28, 1992) is a Swedish former professional ice hockey defenceman who played in the Swedish Hockey League (SHL).

== Playing career ==
Undrafted, Alm played as a youngster in his native Sweden with Skellefteå AIK. He made his senior Swedish Hockey League (SHL) debut with Frölunda HC during the 2009–10 season, before returning to Skellefteå for the 2010–11 campaign. In 2013 and 2014, he won the Swedish championship with the club.

On May 28, 2014, Alm was signed to a two-year entry-level contract with the Nashville Predators of the National Hockey League (NHL). During his two years in the Predators' organization, he did not see any playing time in the NHL and made 81 appearances for Nashville's AHL affiliate, the Milwaukee Admirals.

On May 30, 2016, he signed a deal to return to his native Sweden with former club, Skellefteå AIK of the SHL. Alm played two seasons in his third stint within the organization before leaving as a free agent following the 2018–19 season.

Following two seasons with IK Oskarshamn, Alm left the SHL and opted to sign a one-year contract in the HockeyAllsvenskan, with newly relegated club, Djurgårdens IF on 30 September 2022.

== Career statistics ==
=== Regular season and playoffs ===
| | | | Regular season | | | | | Playoffs |
| Season | Team | League | GP | G | A | Pts | PIM | GP | G | A | Pts | PIM |
|---|---|---|---|---|---|---|---|---|---|---|---|---|
| 2007–08 | Skellefteå AIK | J20 | 1 | 0 | 0 | 0 | 0 | — | — | — | — | — |
| 2008–09 | Skellefteå AIK | J20 | 27 | 1 | 1 | 2 | 10 | 6 | 0 | 1 | 1 | 0 |
| 2009–10 | Frölunda HC | J20 | 37 | 1 | 10 | 11 | 14 | 3 | 0 | 0 | 0 | 0 |
| 2009–10 | Frölunda HC | SEL | 2 | 0 | 0 | 0 | 0 | — | — | — | — | — |
| 2010–11 | Piteå HC | Div 1 | 1 | 0 | 0 | 0 | 2 | — | — | — | — | — |
| 2010–11 | Skellefteå AIK | J20 | 22 | 3 | 13 | 16 | 34 | 5 | 0 | 0 | 0 | 4 |
| 2010–11 | Skellefteå AIK | SEL | 12 | 0 | 1 | 1 | 4 | 3 | 0 | 0 | 0 | 0 |
| 2011–12 | Skellefteå AIK | J20 | 10 | 2 | 2 | 4 | 6 | — | — | — | — | — |
| 2011–12 | Skellefteå AIK | SEL | 36 | 0 | 6 | 6 | 12 | 18 | 0 | 4 | 4 | 14 |
| 2011–12 | VIK Västerås | Allsv | 14 | 0 | 2 | 2 | 8 | — | — | — | — | — |
| 2012–13 | Skellefteå AIK | SEL | 55 | 3 | 5 | 8 | 42 | 6 | 0 | 3 | 3 | 8 |
| 2013–14 | Skellefteå AIK | SHL | 30 | 1 | 6 | 7 | 14 | 11 | 0 | 3 | 3 | 24 |
| 2014–15 | Milwaukee Admirals | AHL | 44 | 0 | 11 | 11 | 18 | — | — | — | — | — |
| 2015–16 | Milwaukee Admirals | AHL | 37 | 0 | 3 | 3 | 16 | — | — | — | — | — |
| 2016–17 | Skellefteå AIK | SHL | 48 | 1 | 8 | 9 | 18 | 7 | 0 | 0 | 0 | 8 |
| 2017–18 | Skellefteå AIK | SHL | 28 | 1 | 3 | 4 | 12 | 15 | 0 | 1 | 1 | 6 |
| 2018–19 | Skellefteå AIK | SHL | 52 | 0 | 9 | 9 | 49 | 6 | 0 | 0 | 0 | 2 |
| 2019–20 | IK Oskarshamn | SHL | 10 | 1 | 0 | 1 | 16 | — | — | — | — | — |
| 2021–22 | IK Oskarshamn | SHL | 8 | 0 | 0 | 0 | 8 | 4 | 0 | 0 | 0 | 0 |
| 2022–23 | Djurgårdens IF | Allsv | 21 | 1 | 3 | 4 | 8 | — | — | — | — | — |
| SHL totals | | | 281 | 7 | 38 | 45 | 175 | 70 | 0 | 11 | 11 | 62 |

=== International ===
| Year | Team | Event | Result | GP | G | A | Pts | PIM |
|---|---|---|---|---|---|---|---|---|
| 2010 | Sweden | U18 | 2nd place, silver medalist(s) | 6 | 0 | 0 | 0 | 4 |
| Junior totals | | | | 44 | 2 | 6 | 8 | 30 |

== Awards and honors ==
| Award | Year |
|---|---|
SHL
| Le Mat Trophy (Skellefteå AIK) | 2013, 2014 |
