= Ville Mäntymaa =

Finnish ice hockey player (born 1985)

- Born: 8 March 1985 (age 41) Seinäjoki, Finland
- Height: 6 ft 3 in (191 cm)
- Weight: 205 lb (93 kg; 14 st 9 lb)
- Position: Defence
- Shot: Right
- Played for: Tappara; Lahti Pelicans; JYP Jyväskylä; Frölunda HC; Kärpät
- NHL draft: 280th overall, 2003; Mighty Ducks of Anaheim
- Playing career: 2002–2013

Ville Jaakko Mäntymaa (born 8 March 1985) is a Finnish former professional ice hockey defenceman.

Mäntymaa played in the SM-liiga for Tappara, Lahti Pelicans, JYP Jyväskylä and Kärpät as well as in Elitserien for Frölunda HC. He was drafted 280th overall by the Mighty Ducks of Anaheim in the 2003 NHL entry draft.

== Career statistics ==
=== Regular season and playoffs ===
			Regular season					Playoffs
Season	Team	League	GP	G	A	Pts	PIM	GP	G	A	Pts	PIM
2000–01	Tappara	FIN U16	13	1	2	3	14	4	0	1	1	4
2000–01	Tappara	FIN U18	2	0	0	0	0	—	—	—	—	—
2001–02	Tappara	FIN U18	1	0	0	0	2	—	—	—	—	—
2001–02	Tappara	FIN U20	32	4	2	6	24	—	—	—	—	—
2002–03	Tappara	FIN U20	33	3	12	15	26	8	2	0	2	4
2002–03	Tappara	SM-l	8	0	0	0	0	1	0	0	0	0
2003–04	Tappara	FIN U20	21	1	7	8	14	14	0	3	3	8
2003–04	Tappara	SM-l	21	0	2	2	8	—	—	—	—	—
2003–04	Pelicans	SM-l	2	0	0	0	0	—	—	—	—	—
2003–04	Suomi U20	Mestis	5	0	1	1	2	—	—	—	—	—
2004–05	Tappara	FIN U20	13	0	6	6	14	4	0	1	1	2
2004–05	Tappara	SM-l	32	1	1	2	18	8	0	1	1	0
2005–06	Tappara	FIN U20	19	8	10	18	14	—	—	—	—	—
2005–06	Tappara	SM-l	32	1	0	1	18	6	0	1	1	0
2005–06	Kiekko–Vantaa	Mestis	3	1	1	2	2	—	—	—	—	—
2006–07	Tappara	SM-l	56	0	2	2	30	5	0	0	0	12
2007–08	JYP	SM-l	54	8	23	31	56	6	0	1	1	4
2008–09	JYP	SM-l	57	7	17	24	36	15	0	3	3	8
2009–10	Frölunda HC	SEL	28	2	6	8	18	5	0	0	0	0
2010–11	Frölunda HC	SEL	46	3	1	4	18	—	—	—	—	—
2011–12	Kärpät	SM-l	49	4	4	8	24	8	1	2	3	10
2012–13	Kärpät	SM-l	28	1	4	5	16	—	—	—	—	—
SM-l totals			339	22	53	75	206	49	1	8	9	34

=== International ===
Year	Team	Event	GP	G	A	Pts	PIM
2002	Finland	WJC18	7	0	2	2	2
2003	Finland	WJC18	6	1	3	4	6
2005	Finland	WJC	4	1	1	2	2
Junior totals			17	2	6	8	10
