= Tomi Pettinen =

Finnish ice hockey player

- Born: June 17, 1977 (age 48) Ylöjärvi, Finland
- Height: 6 ft 3 in (191 cm)
- Weight: 220 lb (100 kg; 15 st 10 lb)
- Position: Defence
- Shot: Left
- Played for: Ilves; Lukko; HIFK; New York Islanders; Frölunda HC
- National team: Finland
- NHL draft: 267th overall, 2000; New York Islanders
- Playing career: 1996–2012

Tomi Pettinen (born June 17, 1977) is a Finnish former professional ice hockey defenceman. He played 24 games in the National Hockey League with the New York Islanders between 2002 and 2006. The rest of his career, which lasted from 1996 to 2012, was mainly spent in the SM-liiga. He was drafted by the New York Islanders as their ninth-round pick, #267 overall, in the 2000 NHL entry draft.

Pettinen came to North America in 2002 to play for Islanders minor league club, the Bridgeport Sound Tigers. While in his native Finland, he has played for Ilves, HIFK, and Lukko.

== Career statistics ==
			Regular season					Playoffs
Season	Team	League	GP	G	A	Pts	PIM	GP	G	A	Pts	PIM
1992–93	Ilves	FIN U16	31	2	2	4	4	—	—	—	—	—
1994–95	Ilves	FIN U18	31	1	6	7	46	4	0	0	0	2
1994–95	Ilves	FIN U20	1	0	0	0	0	—	—	—	—	—
1995–96	KOOVEE	FIN U20	21	0	0	0	64	—	—	—	—	—
1996–97	Ilves	FIN U20	14	2	4	6	18	—	—	—	—	—
1996–97	Ilves	SM-l	16	1	0	1	12	—	—	—	—	—
1997–98	Ilves	SM-l	3	0	0	0	0	—	—	—	—	—
1997–98	Lukko	FIN U20	4	2	2	4	2	—	—	—	—	—
1997–98	Lukko	SM-l	27	0	2	2	16	—	—	—	—	—
1998–99	HIFK	SM-l	4	0	0	0	2	—	—	—	—	—
1998–99	Hermes	FIN-2	42	8	6	14	76	3	0	0	0	6
1999–00	Ilves	SM-l	51	1	6	7	78	3	1	2	3	2
2000–01	Ilves	SM-l	56	2	2	4	86	9	0	0	0	4
2001–02	Ilves	SM-l	48	5	4	9	51	3	0	0	0	4
2001–02	Bridgeport Sound Tigers	AHL	—	—	—	—	—	9	0	1	1	0
2002–03	New York Islanders	NHL	2	0	0	0	0	—	—	—	—	—
2002–03	Bridgeport Sound Tigers	AHL	75	1	8	9	56	9	0	0	0	17
2003–04	New York Islanders	NHL	4	0	0	0	2	—	—	—	—	—
2003–04	Bridgeport Sound Tigers	AHL	71	1	8	9	37	7	1	0	1	0
2004–05	Lukko	SM-l	56	6	14	20	49	9	0	2	2	33
2005–06	New York Islanders	NHL	18	0	0	0	16	—	—	—	—	—
2005–06	Bridgeport Sound Tigers	AHL	29	0	6	6	38	7	0	1	1	14
2006–07	Frölunda HC	SEL	27	0	0	0	14	—	—	—	—	—
2006–07	Leksands IF	Allsv	19	5	6	11	18	—	—	—	—	—
2007–08	Leksands IF	Allsv	44	7	17	24	34	—	—	—	—	—
2008–09	Lukko	SM-l	46	6	7	13	34	—	—	—	—	—
2009–10	Lukko	SM-l	43	6	21	27	22	—	—	—	—	—
2010–11	Lukko	SM-l	49	6	4	10	36	6	1	1	2	2
2011–12	Lukko	SM-l	38	1	1	2	34	3	0	1	1	0
SM-l totals			437	34	55	89	420	33	2	6	8	45
NHL totals			24	0	0	0	18	—	—	—	—	—
