= Joel Gistedt =

Swedish ice hockey player (born 1987)

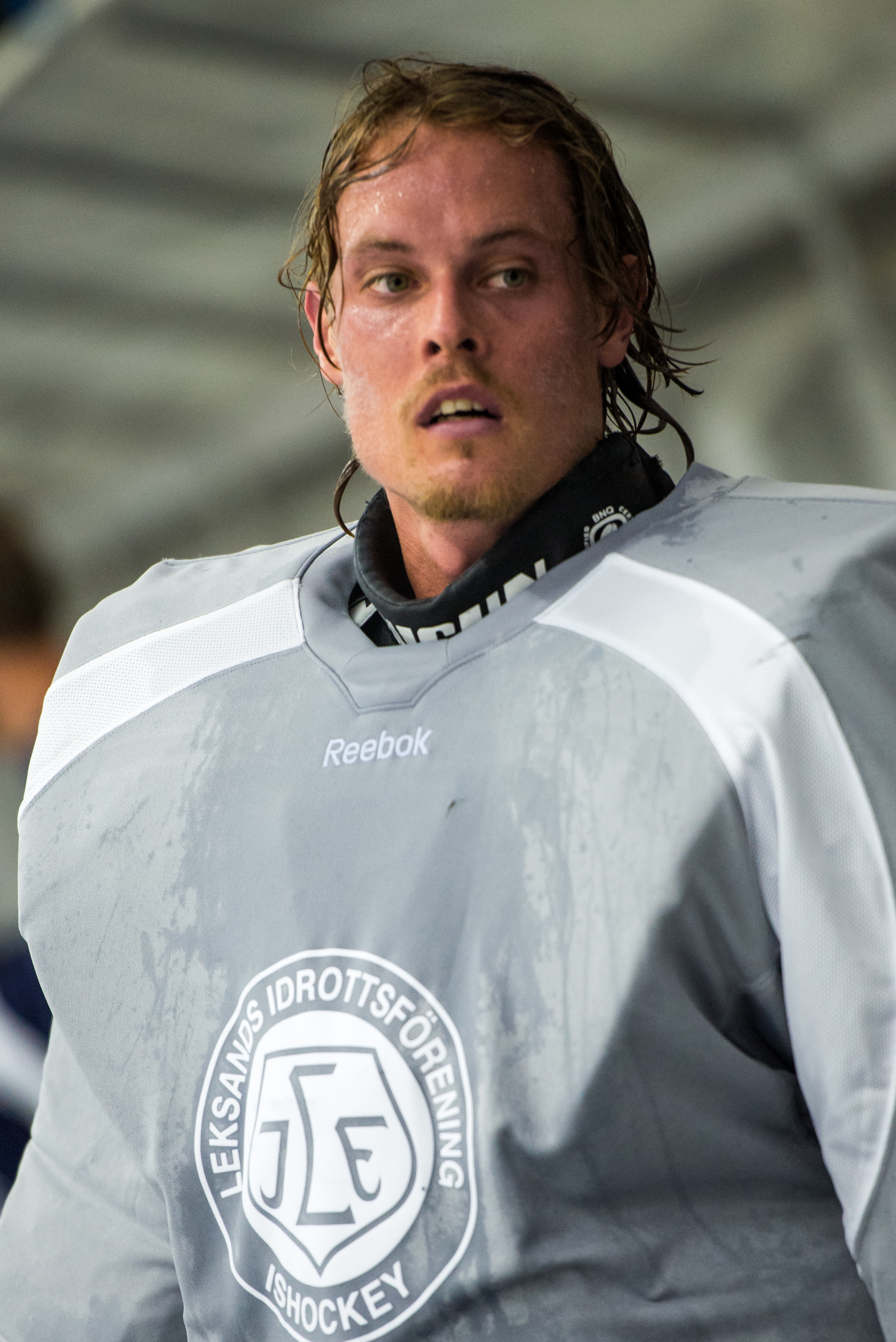
- Born: December 7, 1987 (age 38) Uddevalla, Sweden
- Height: 5 ft 11 in (180 cm)
- Weight: 201 lb (91 kg; 14 st 5 lb)
- Position: Goaltender
- Caught: Left
- Played for: Frölunda HC; San Antonio Rampage; Rögle BK; Leksands IF; Brynäs IF; Kristianstads IK
- NHL draft: 36th overall, 2007; Phoenix Coyotes
- Playing career: 2005–2020

Joel Alf Ivar Gistedt (born December 7, 1987) is a former professional Swedish ice hockey goaltender. He last played for Kristianstads IK in the HockeyAllsvenskan (Allsv). Gistedt was selected by the Phoenix Coyotes in the 2nd round (36th overall) of the 2007 NHL entry draft whilst playing as a youth in Frölunda HC organization.

== Playing career ==
After stints with Rögle BK and Karlskoga of the HockeyAllsvenskan on April 18, 2013, Gistedt joined Leksands IF in the Swedish Hockey League.

Gistedt returned to Karlskoga of the Allsvenskan on an initial loan before signing a one-year deal on May 13, 2015.

== International play ==
He was the starting goalie for the Swedish national junior team in the 2007 World Junior Ice Hockey Championships. Gistedt won LG Hockey Games and Euro Hockey Tour in 2007. He played against Russia on LG Hockey Games 2007 then Sweden won 6:2.
