= Jonathan Johansson (ice hockey) =

Swedish ice hockey player (born 1991)

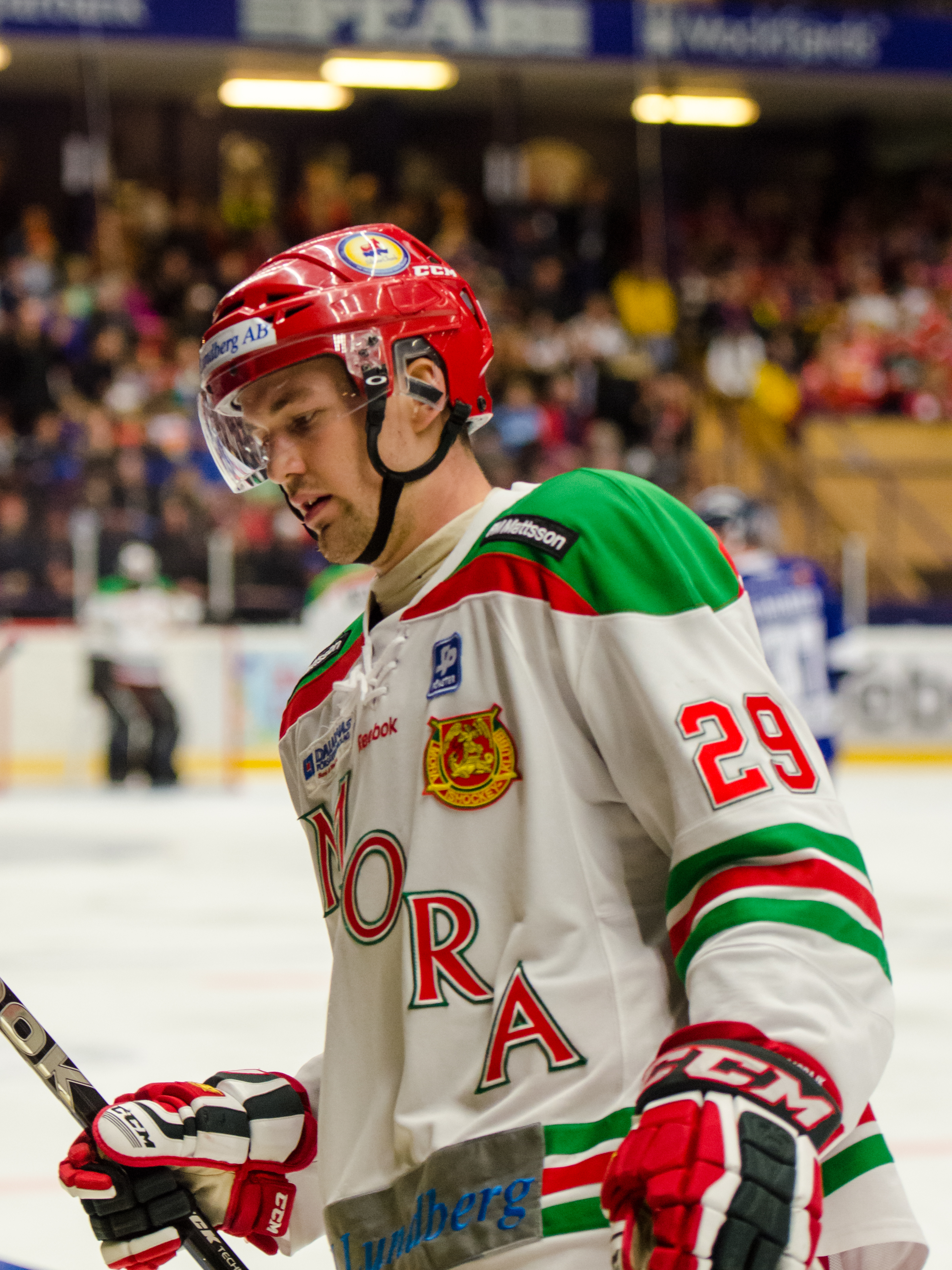
- Born: June 30, 1991 (age 35) Gothenburg, Sweden
- Height: 6 ft 3 in (191 cm)
- Weight: 198 lb (90 kg; 14 st 2 lb)
- Position: Centre
- Shot: Left
- Played for: Frölunda HC
- NHL draft: Undrafted
- Playing career: 2009–2016

Jonathan Johansson (born June 30, 1991) is a Swedish former professional ice hockey centre.

== Playing career ==
Johansson played for Frölunda HC of the SHL, Mora IK in the HockeyAllsvenskan as well as Kallinge/Ronneby IF & Kristianstads IK of the Hockeyettan, which is the third highest-level league in Sweden. He joined Ronneby after three seasons with Mora IK. Johansson also spent one season overseas in Canada, where he played for the Brampton Battalion of the Ontario Hockey League. Internationally, Johansson played games for Sweden’s national team at both the U18 and U19 Level.

== Career statistics ==
=== Regular season and playoffs ===
			Regular season					Playoffs
Season	Team	League	GP	G	A	Pts	PIM	GP	G	A	Pts	PIM
2008–09	Frölunda HC	J20	24	5	6	11	8	3	0	0	0	0
2009–10	Frölunda HC	J20	31	18	12	30	14	5	2	0	2	0
2009–10	Frölunda HC	SEL	2	0	0	0	0	—	—	—	—	—
2010–11	Brampton Battalion	OHL	46	7	14	21	18	4	0	0	0	0
2011–12	Mora IK	J20	2	0	0	0	0	—	—	—	—	—
2011–12	Mora IK	Allsv	52	7	9	16	59	—	—	—	—	—
2012–13	Mora IK	Allsv	44	2	4	6	20	—	—	—	—	—
2013–14	Mora IK	Allsv	28	5	3	8	18	—	—	—	—	—
2014–15	Kallinge/Ronneby IF	Div.1	36	10	9	19	24	2	0	0	0	2
2015–16	Kallinge/Ronneby IF	Div.1	32	4	5	9	22	—	—	—	—	—
2015–16	Kristianstads IK	Div.1	—	—	—	—	—	9	1	3	4	2
SHL totals			2	0	0	0	0	—	—	—	—	—

=== International ===
Year	Team	Event	Result	GP	G	A	Pts	PIM
2009	Sweden	U18	5th	6	0	0	0	4
Junior totals				6	0	0	0	4
