= Joel Lundqvist =

Swedish ice hockey player (born 1982)

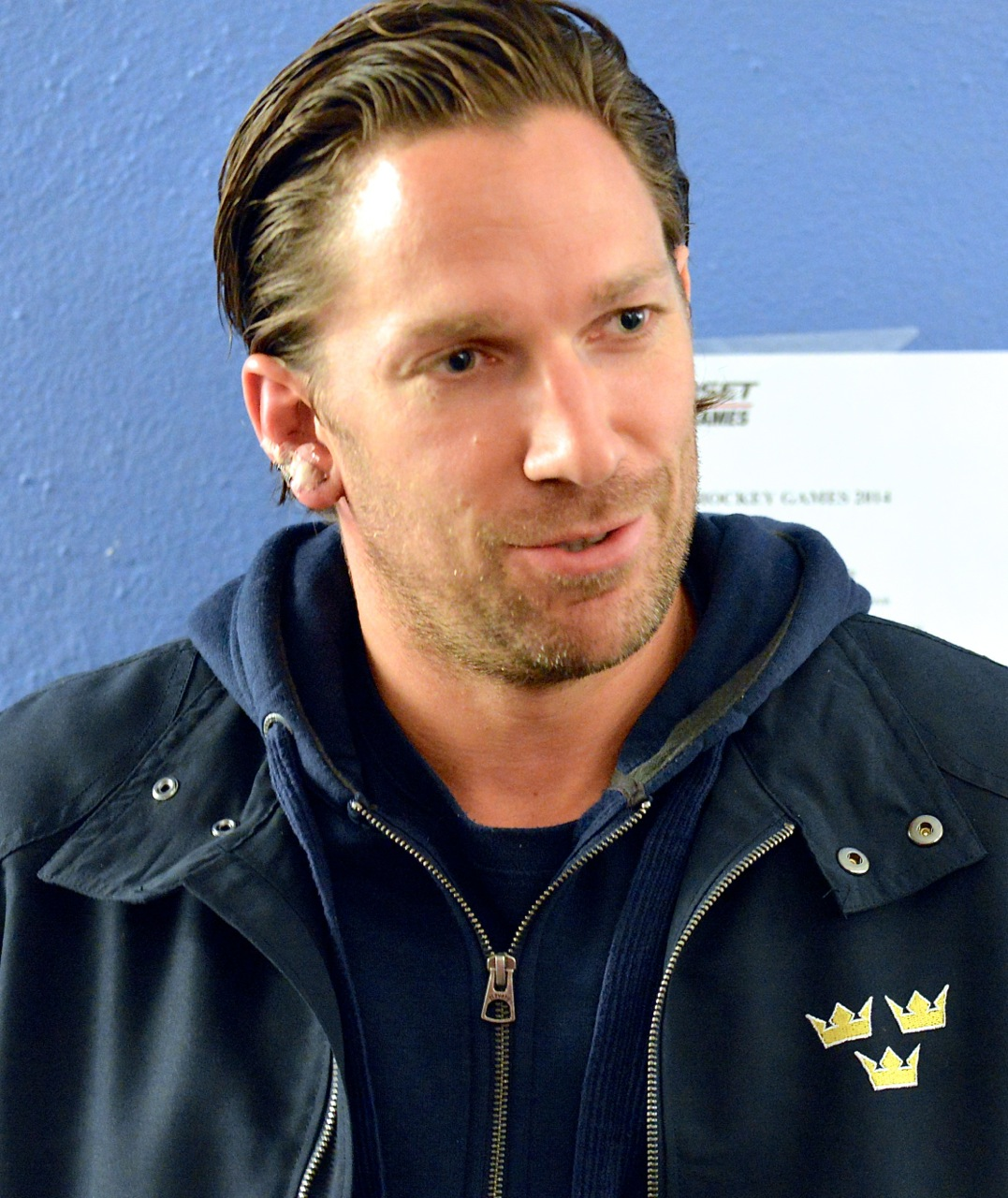
- Lundqvist in 2014
- Born: 2 March 1982 (age 43) Åre, Sweden
- Height: 6 ft 0 in (183 cm)
- Weight: 201 lb (91 kg; 14 st 5 lb)
- Position: Centre
- Shot: Left
- Played for: Frölunda HC; Dallas Stars
- National team: Sweden
- NHL draft: 68th overall, 2000; Dallas Stars
- Playing career: 2000–2023

Joel Per Lundqvist (born 2 March 1982) is a Swedish former professional ice hockey player. He played as a centre, spending the majority of his career with Frölunda HC of Swedish Hockey League (SHL) and also played in the National Hockey League (NHL) for the Dallas Stars from 2006 to 2009. He holds the record for most appearances in the SHL. His identical twin brother is former NHL goaltender Henrik Lundqvist.

== Early life ==
Joel and identical twin brother Henrik, a retired 15-year goaltender with the New York Rangers of the National Hockey League (NHL), were born to Eva Johansson and Peter Lundqvist. They grew up in Åre, Jämtland, an area where alpine skiing is the most popular winter activity, but Henrik and Joel chose to play ice hockey over the more popular winter sports. During the winters their kindergarten teachers used the kindergarten's 9 by 3 meters (29.5 ft × 9.8 ft) sandpit to freeze an outdoor ice rink where the twins would frequently skate. Their interest in hockey grew even larger when their father Peter took the twins to see Frölunda HC play in Scandinavium, Gothenburg. Peter worked for a company who sponsored Frölunda, and Henrik and Joel saw many games in Scandinavium and Frölunda became their favourite team. In 1990 Henrik and Joel joined Järpens IF and started playing organized hockey for the first time. During one practice when the coach asked if anyone wanted to be a goaltender Joel grabbed and raised Henrik's arm and said that his brother would like to.

In 1993 the family moved to Båstad, Skåne, in southern Sweden to support their older sister Gabriella's tennis career. Henrik and Joel joined local team Rögle BK, and were both selected for Scania's regional team in Sverigepucken in 1995. Henrik was selected to play for Scania in TV-pucken in 1996, and in 1997 when Joel was also selected. During the 1997–98 season Henrik and Joel were extensively scouted by Frölunda, and while playing for Rögle in the 1998 Scandinavium Cup in Gothenburg, Frölunda's junior team manager and U16 coach Janne Karlsson contacted their father, who told Henrik and Joel about Frölunda's interest in them while driving home to Båstad.

== Playing career ==
He was selected by the Dallas Stars in the 2000 NHL entry draft (third round, 68th overall) and signed a one-year, entry-level, two-way contract with them in May 2006. He started his 2006 season in Iowa Stars scoring 38 points in 40 games but was called up and played his first game in Dallas on 3 December 2006. Lundqvist played 7 games in his first NHL playoff series, scoring two goals, and was assigned back to Iowa when Dallas was eliminated.

Lundqvist scored his first career NHL goal against Calgary Flames goaltender Miikka Kiprusoff on 17 January 2007.

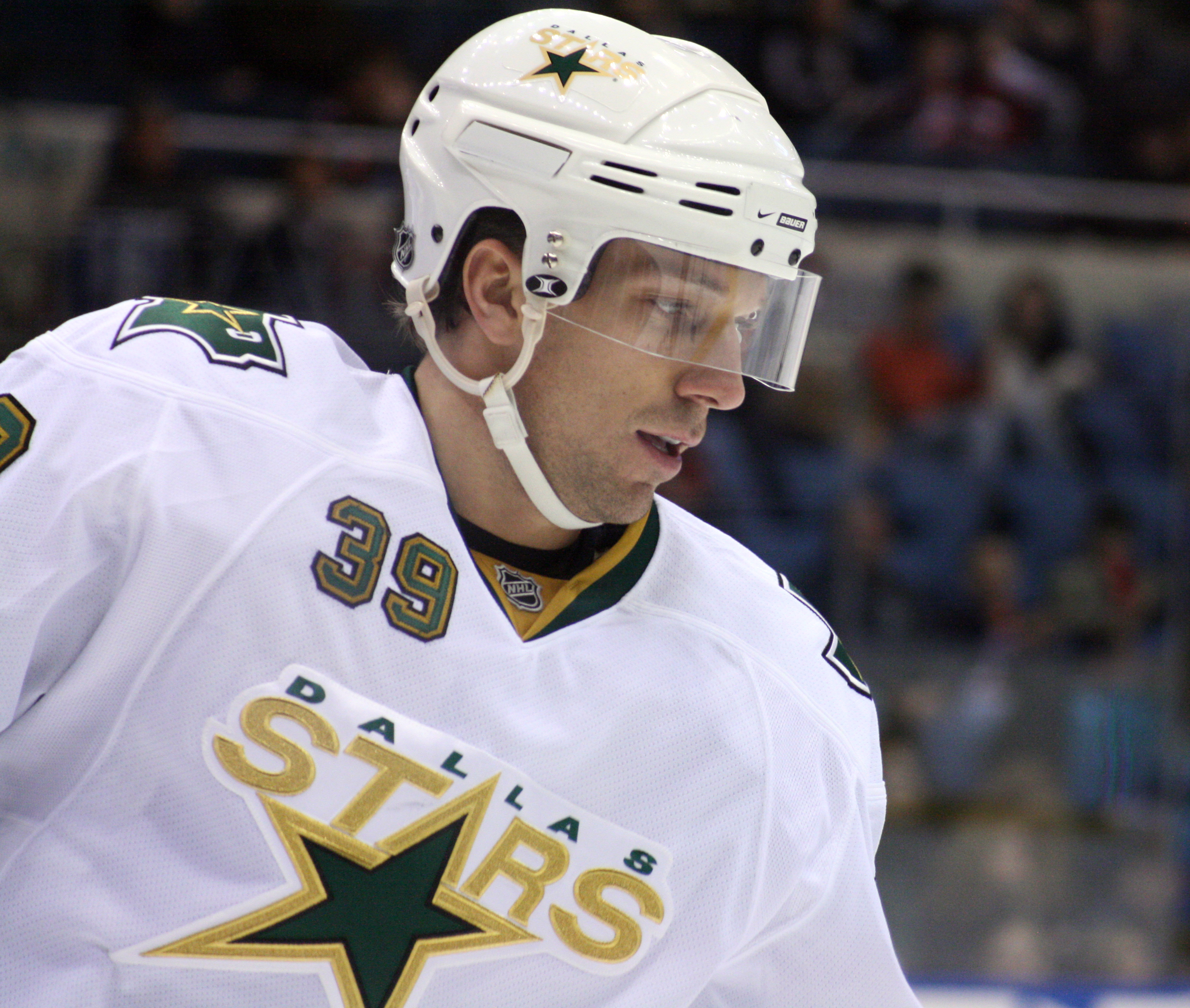
Lundqvist during his tenure with the Stars.

His identical twin brother Henrik had a successful rookie season as goaltender for the New York Rangers in the 2005–06 season. He was afforded the opportunity to play his twin brother on 14 December 2006, in Dallas. It was the first time that a goaltender faced his twin. He and his brother are only the third set of twins to play each other in an NHL game in the history of the league.

In 2009, he returned to his native Sweden, signing with Frölunda HC. In 2011, Lundqvist became the October nominee for Guldpucken. Serving as team captain, he led Frölunda to win the 2016 Swedish national championship as well as the Champions Hockey League (CHL). In 2017, Frölunda repeated as CHL champions with Lundqvist earning Most Valuable Player honors.

Lundqvist retired at the end of the 2022–23 SHL season when Frölunda HC was eliminated in the semi-finals of the SHL playoffs.

== Career statistics ==
=== Regular season and playoffs ===
			Regular season					Playoffs
Season	Team	League	GP	G	A	Pts	PIM	GP	G	A	Pts	PIM
1998–99	Västra Frölunda HC	J18 Allsv	32	26	38	64	37	4	3	1	4	2
1999–2000	Västra Frölunda HC	J18 Allsv	4	2	4	6	4	—	—	—	—	—
1999–2000	Västra Frölunda HC	J20	25	7	12	19	2	6	2	3	5	2
2000–01	Västra Frölunda HC	J20	9	4	10	14	12	—	—	—	—	—
2000–01	Västra Frölunda HC	SEL	9	0	0	0	0	—	—	—	—	—
2000–01	Mölndal HC	Allsv	17	10	5	15	10	9	8	8	16	0
2001–02	Västra Frölunda HC	SEL	46	12	14	26	28	10	1	3	4	8
2001–02	Västra Frölunda HC	J20	—	—	—	—	—	1	0	0	0	0
2002–03	Västra Frölunda HC	SEL	50	17	20	37	113	16	6	3	9	12
2003–04	Västra Frölunda HC	SEL	49	9	14	23	48	10	2	2	4	8
2004–05	Frölunda HC	SEL	50	7	12	19	38	13	2	5	7	57
2005–06	Frölunda HC	SEL	49	10	22	32	87	17	3	4	7	34
2006–07	Iowa Stars	AHL	40	16	22	38	30	9	6	4	10	10
2006–07	Dallas Stars	NHL	36	3	3	6	14	7	2	0	2	6
2007–08	Iowa Stars	AHL	8	2	4	6	2	—	—	—	—	—
2007–08	Dallas Stars	NHL	55	3	11	14	22	18	2	5	7	8
2008–09	Dallas Stars	NHL	43	1	5	6	20	—	—	—	—	—
2009–10	Frölunda HC	SEL	49	11	20	31	34	1	0	0	0	0
2010–11	Frölunda HC	SEL	31	9	8	17	16	—	—	—	—	—
2011–12	Frölunda HC	SEL	48	11	19	30	63	6	0	2	2	4
2012–13	Frölunda HC	SEL	55	12	22	34	57	6	3	2	5	6
2013–14	Frölunda HC	SHL	46	3	14	17	59	7	1	2	3	4
2014–15	Frölunda HC	SHL	55	5	17	22	18	13	3	2	5	4
2015–16	Frölunda HC	SHL	45	19	19	38	22	3	1	2	3	0
2016–17	Frölunda HC	SHL	51	9	17	26	24	14	2	10	12	6
2017–18	Frölunda HC	SHL	43	4	16	20	49	6	1	0	1	2
2018–19	Frölunda HC	SHL	51	13	18	31	26	16	6	7	13	35
2019–20	Frölunda HC	SHL	46	17	14	31	39	—	—	—	—	—
2020–21	Frölunda HC	SHL	39	10	13	23	45	4	0	0	0	4
2021–22	Frölunda HC	SHL	52	9	16	25	28	9	1	1	2	2
2022–23	Frölunda HC	SHL	51	11	18	29	14	12	1	2	3	27
SHL totals			915	199	312	511	814	174	34	51	85	217
NHL totals			134	7	19	26	56	25	4	5	9	14

=== International ===
Medal record

Representing Sweden

Men's ice hockey

World Championships
Gold medal – first place	2006 Latvia	
Gold medal – first place	2013 Sweden/Finland	
Gold medal – first place	2017 Germany/France	
Bronze medal – third place	2009 Switzerland	
Bronze medal – third place	2014 Belarus	

IIHF World U18 Championships
Bronze medal – third place	2000 Switzerland	

Year	Team	Event	Result	GP	G	A	Pts	PIM
2000	Sweden	WJC18	3rd place, bronze medalist(s)	6	3	1	4	2
2002	Sweden	WJC	6th	7	1	1	2	6
2006	Sweden	WC	1st place, gold medalist(s)	8	1	0	1	4
2009	Sweden	WC	3rd place, bronze medalist(s)	1	0	0	0	0
2012	Sweden	WC	6th	3	1	1	2	2
2013	Sweden	WC	1st place, gold medalist(s)	10	0	3	3	6
2014	Sweden	WC	3rd place, bronze medalist(s)	10	1	0	1	4
2015	Sweden	WC	5th	8	2	1	3	0
2017	Sweden	WC	1st place, gold medalist(s)	10	1	1	2	4
2018	Sweden	OG	5th	4	0	0	0	6
Junior totals				13	4	2	6	8
Senior totals				54	6	6	12	26

== Awards and honors ==
Award	Year
SHL
Rookie of the Year nominee	2002
Le Mat Trophy champion	2003, 2005, 2016, 2019
AHL
All-Star Game	2007
CHL
Champion	2016, 2017, 2019, 2020
MVP	2017

== See also ==
- List of family relations in the NHL

Preceded by Niklas Andersson	Frölunda HC captain 2009–2023	Succeeded by Max Friberg
