= H. Johan Andersson =

Swedish ice hockey player

Johan Andersson
- Born: 9 March 1984 (age 41); Mariestad, Sweden
- Height: 6 ft 0 in (183 cm)
- Weight: 190 lb (86 kg; 13 st 8 lb)
- Position: Winger
- Shoots: Left
- No team Former teams: Unknown; Växjö Lakers; Frölunda HC
- NHL draft: Undrafted
- Playing career: 2002–present

Hans Johan "Bois" Andersson (born 9 March 1984) is a Swedish professional ice hockey player (winger), who most recently played in Växjö Lakers of the Elitserien (SEL) in the 2012–13 season.
