= Per Bäckman =

Swedish ice hockey player

- Born: 22 July 1950 (age 74); Surahammar, Sweden
- Position: Forward
- Shot: Right
- Played for: Surahammars IF; Färjestads BK; IK Oskarshamn
- Playing career: 1965–1981

Per Ole Bäckman (born 22 July 1950) is a retired Swedish professional ice hockey player, now coach. He was the head coach of the Danish national team in a period of 5 years, from 2008 to 2013. He has also been the coach for Färjestads BK when they won the Swedish Championship in 1997. Between 1972 and 1978, he also played for Färjestad. From 2006 to 2007, he was the head coach of Frölunda HC before being fired and replaced by Roger Melin.
