= Oscar Ackeström =

Swedish ice hockey player

- Born: November 29, 1972 Gothenburg, Sweden
- Height: 1.86 m (6 ft 1 in)
- Weight: 87 kg (192 lb; 13 st 10 lb)
- Position: Defence
- Shot: Left
- DEL team Former teams: Hannover Scorpions; Lukko (FIN); HPK (FIN); HC Ambri-Piotta (NLA); HC Thurgau (NLB); SCL Tigers (NLA); HC Davos (NLA); Linköpings HC (SEL); Frölunda HC (SEL)
- Playing career: 1990–2015

Oscar Fredrik Ackeström (born November 29, 1972, in Gothenburg, Sweden) is a retired professional Swedish ice hockey player. In 2009 he was a defenseman for the Hannover Scorpions in the Deutsche Eishockey Liga.

== Career statistics ==
Season	Team	League	Regular season					Playoffs				
Season	Team	League	GP	G	A	Pts	PIM	GP	G	A	Pts	PIM
1990–91	Västra Frölunda HC J20	Juniorserien	—	—	—	—	—	—	—	—	—	—
1990–91	Västra Frölunda HC	Elitserien	8	0	0	0	0	—	—	—	—	—
1990–91	Västra Frölunda HC	Allsvenskan D1	—	—	—	—	—	1	0	0	0	0
1991–92	Västra Frölunda HC J20	Juniorserien	—	—	—	—	—	—	—	—	—	—
1991–92	Västra Frölunda HC	Elitserien	21	0	0	0	6	—	—	—	—	—
1992–93	Västra Frölunda HC	Elitserien	18	2	1	3	8	—	—	—	—	—
1992–93	Västra Frölunda HC	Allsvenskan D1	18	4	6	10	8	—	—	—	—	—
1993–94	Västra Frölunda HC	Elitserien	37	6	4	10	32	4	0	0	0	6
1994–95	Västra Frölunda HC	Elitserien	21	1	2	3	6	—	—	—	—	—
1994–95	Västra Frölunda HC	Allsvenskan D1	18	1	7	8	12	5	0	0	0	2
1995–96	Västra Frölunda HC J20	J20 SuperElit	6	1	4	5	10	—	—	—	—	—
1995–96	Västra Frölunda HC	Elitserien	39	1	1	2	18	13	0	0	0	12
1996–97	Lukko	SM-liiga	49	4	17	21	46	—	—	—	—	—
1997–98	Lukko	SM-liiga	46	7	17	24	30	—	—	—	—	—
1998–99	Ilves	SM-liiga	54	10	12	22	34	1	0	0	0	0
1999–00	HPK	SM-liiga	53	17	22	39	118	8	0	4	4	12
2000–01	Hannover Scorpions	DEL	60	4	20	24	32	6	1	3	4	10
2001–02	Hannover Scorpions	DEL	60	9	14	23	40	—	—	—	—	—
2002–03	Västra Frölunda HC	Elitserien	47	10	9	19	76	16	2	3	5	16
2003–04	Västra Frölunda HC	Elitserien	43	6	11	17	109	10	1	3	4	43
2004–05	HC Ambrì-Piotta	NLA	13	1	12	13	2	4	0	3	3	6
2004–05	HC Thurgau	NLB	5	1	3	4	8	—	—	—	—	—
2005–06	SC Langnau	NLA	28	2	10	12	36	—	—	—	—	—
2005–06	HC Davos	NLA	8	2	4	6	8	11	0	0	0	42
2006–07	Linköping HC	Elitserien	44	3	6	9	52	—	—	—	—	—
2006–07	Frölunda HC	Elitserien	10	1	1	2	18	—	—	—	—	—
2007–08	Frölunda HC	Elitserien	47	4	5	9	83	7	0	3	3	10
2008–09	Frölunda HC	Elitserien	7	0	1	1	2	—	—	—	—	—
2008–09	Hannover Scorpions	DEL	40	3	15	18	30	11	1	1	2	6
2009–10	Fehérvár AV19	EBEL	54	5	17	22	74	11	1	1	2	6
2009–10	Fehérvár AV19	Hungary	—	—	—	—	—	5	1	2	3	10
2010–11	Fehérvár AV19	EBEL	47	1	21	22	60	—	—	—	—	—
2010–11	Fehérvár AV19	Hungary	—	—	—	—	—	4	1	3	4	6
2014–15	Vänersborgs HC	Division 3	9	1	4	5	4	6	0	3	3	6
Elitserien totals			342	34	41	75	410	50	3	9	12	87
SM-liiga totals			202	38	68	106	228	9	0	4	4	12
DEL totals			160	16	49	65	102	17	2	4	6	16
NLA totals			49	5	26	31	46	15	0	3	3	48
