= Jonas Johnson =

Swedish ice hockey player

- Born: March 23, 1970 (age 56) Gävle, Sweden
- Height: 6 ft 2 in (188 cm)
- Weight: 185 lb (84 kg; 13 st 3 lb)
- Position: Centre
- Shot: Left
- Played for: SEL; Frölunda HC; Brynäs IF; IF Björklöven; DEL; EV Landshut
- NHL draft: 221st overall, 2002; St. Louis Blues
- Playing career: 1987–2009

Paul Jonas Johnson (born March 23, 1970) is a Swedish former professional ice hockey player. He spent ten seasons as centre, playing for Frölunda HC in the Swedish elite league Elitserien. Johnson also served as Frölunda's captain for five years before retiring after the 2007-08 season. In mid January, 2009, Frölunda reported that Johnson is training with the team due to the numerous injuries in the team. Johnson has two sons, Jonathan Johnson who play with Skellefteå AIK and Andreas Johnson, a 2013 draft pick who played seven seasons in the National Hockey League (NHL), including for the Toronto Maple Leafs, New Jersey Devils, and San Jose Sharks, before returning to Sweden to also play for Skellefteå AIK.

== Career statistics ==
=== Regular season and playoffs ===
			Regular season					Playoffs
Season	Team	League	GP	G	A	Pts	PIM	GP	G	A	Pts	PIM
1987–88	Strömsbro/Gävle HF 83	SWE.2	13	4	3	7	0	—	—	—	—	—
1988–89	Strömsbro/Gävle HF 83	SWE.2	27	5	3	8	10	—	—	—	—	—
1989–90	Strömsbro/Gävle HF 83	SWE.2	24	13	6	19	8	—	—	—	—	—
1990–91	IF Björklöven	SWE.2	36	10	15	25	32	—	—	—	—	—
1991–92	Brynäs IF	SEL	39	6	9	15	8	5	3	0	3	0
1992–93	Brynäs IF	SEL	39	8	16	24	24	10	6	4	10	6
1993–94	Brynäs IF	SEL	39	11	16	27	14	7	2	1	3	8
1994–95	Brynäs IF	SEL	39	9	15	24	22	14	4	6	10	14
1995–96	Brynäs IF	SEL	22	11	6	17	12	—	—	—	—	—
1996–97	EV Landshut	DEL	48	7	19	26	6	7	2	0	2	4
1997–98	EV Landshut	DEL	48	8	6	14	18	6	0	1	1	8
1998–99	Västra Frölunda HC	SEL	46	13	21	34	44	4	1	1	2	6
1999–2000	Västra Frölunda HC	SEL	50	17	18	35	73	5	0	2	2	6
2000–01	Västra Frölunda HC	SEL	50	15	29	44	75	5	4	3	7	12
2001–02	Västra Frölunda HC	SEL	50	14	31	45	24	10	3	2	5	4
2002–03	Västra Frölunda HC	SEL	49	12	23	35	24	16	3	3	6	27
2003–04	Västra Frölunda HC	SEL	49	14	14	28	68	10	3	5	8	2
2004–05	Frölunda HC	SEL	48	18	9	27	34	14	2	10	12	8
2005–06	Frölunda HC	SEL	49	20	17	37	36	17	2	11	13	4
2006–07	Frölunda HC	SEL	55	17	18	35	46	—	—	—	—	—
2007–08	Frölunda HC	SEL	53	16	11	27	38	7	4	3	7	6
2008–09	Frölunda HC	SEL	13	0	5	5	0	11	2	3	5	10
SWE.2 totals			100	32	27	59	50	—	—	—	—	—
SEL totals			690	201	259	460	546	135	39	55	94	113

=== International ===
Year	Team	Event	GP	G	A	Pts	PIM
1995	Sweden	WC	8	1	1	2	0
2002	Sweden	WC	9	1	4	5	2
Senior totals			17	2	5	7	2

Preceded by Mikael Andersson	Frölunda HC captains 2003–2008	Succeeded by Niklas Andersson
