= Stephan Lundh =

Swedish ice hockey coach

Personal information
- Born: 6 November 1959 (age 65)
- Occupation: Coach

Sport
- Sport: ice hockey

Stephan "Lillis" Lundh (born 6 November 1959 in Stockholm, Sweden) is a Swedish ice hockey coach.

Lundh's coaching career started in 1989 in Nacka. He was an assistant coach in Djurgården between 1990 and 1998, Tre Kronor and then Malmö IF 1999 to 2004 and Frölunda HC 2004 to 7 November 2006.
