= Karl Fabricius =

Swedish professional ice hockey winger

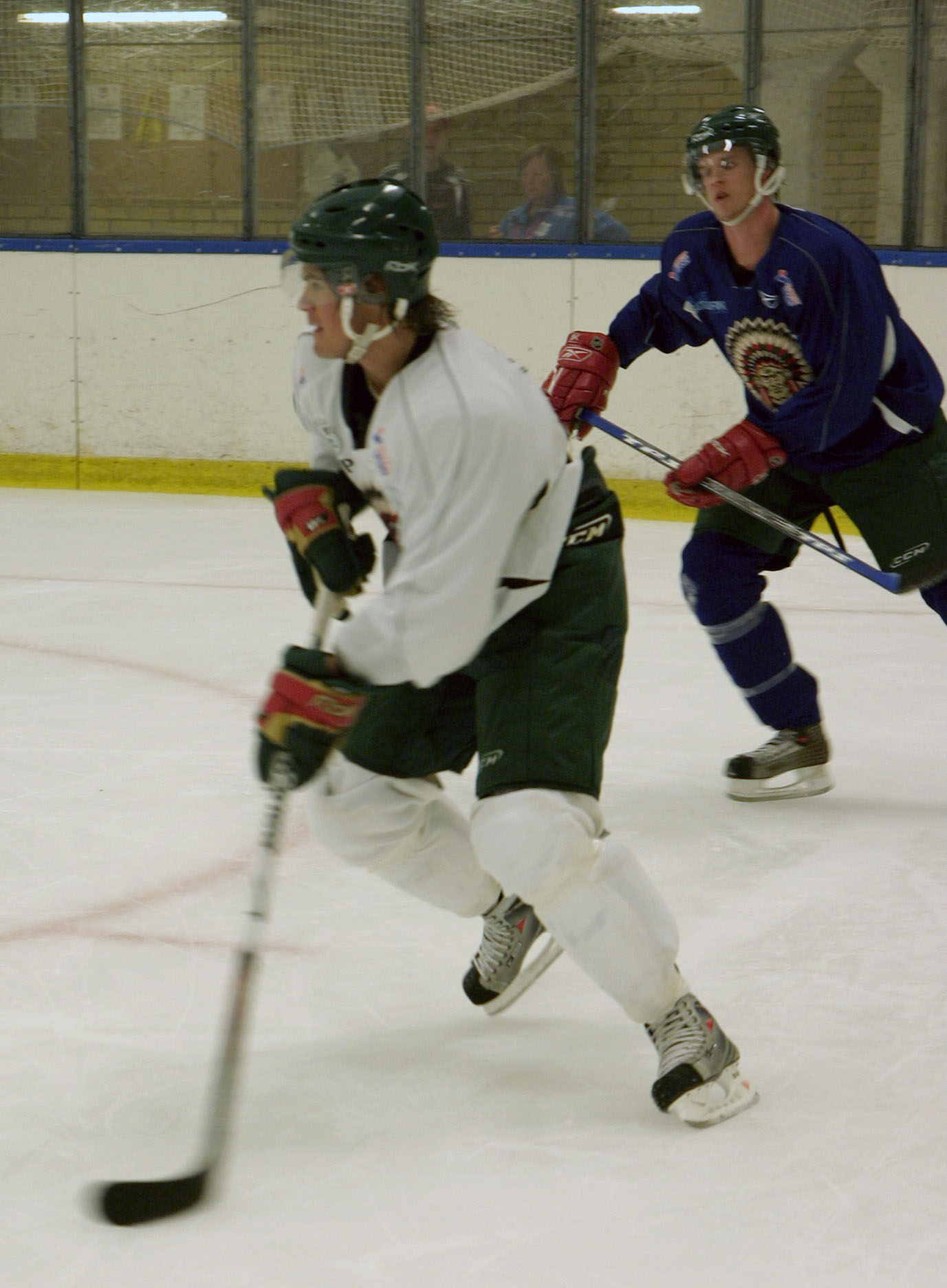
- Born: 29 September 1982 (age 42); Boden, Sweden
- Height: 6 ft 0 in (183 cm)
- Weight: 192 lb (87 kg; 13 st 10 lb)
- Position: Left/Right Wing
- Shot: Left
- Played for: Luleå HF; Frölunda HC; Lev Poprad; Heilbronner Falken
- National team: Sweden
- Playing career: 2000–2022

Karl Johan Oskar Fabricius (born 29 September 1982) is a Swedish former professional ice hockey winger, who most notably played with Luleå HF in the Swedish Hockey League (SHL). He previously played the 2011–12 season, with HC Lev Poprad, a team located in Poprad, Slovakia of the Kontinental Hockey League (KHL). Late in his career, Fabricius also played for a short time for Heilbronner Falken in the German Second League.

== Career statistics ==
=== Regular season and playoffs ===
			Regular season					Playoffs
Season	Team	League	GP	G	A	Pts	PIM	GP	G	A	Pts	PIM
2000–01	Luleå HF	SEL	28	0	0	0	6	11	0	0	0	0
2001–02	Luleå HF	SEL	13	0	2	2	0	—	—	—	—	—
2001–02	Team Kiruna IF	Allsv	2	2	0	2	0	—	—	—	—	—
2001–02	Bodens IK	Allsv	10	1	0	1	8	10	1	4	5	8
2002–03	Piteå HC	Allsv	41	14	12	26	39	—	—	—	—	—
2003–04	Luleå HF	SEL	34	8	8	16	22	5	1	1	2	10
2004–05	Luleå HF	SEL	48	7	8	15	8	4	0	2	2	0
2005–06	Luleå HF	SEL	50	11	11	22	14	6	0	0	0	0
2006–07	Frölunda HC	SEL	55	8	12	20	47	—	—	—	—	—
2007–08	Frölunda HC	SEL	55	12	12	24	22	7	2	1	3	0
2008–09	Frölunda HC	SEL	48	5	3	8	30	11	0	1	1	8
2009–10	Luleå HF	SEL	55	6	19	25	28	—	—	—	—	—
2010–11	Luleå HF	SEL	54	5	7	12	6	13	1	0	1	0
2011–12	HC Lev Poprad	KHL	48	1	7	8	20	—	—	—	—	—
2012–13	Luleå HF	SEL	50	5	7	12	32	15	2	2	4	12
2013–14	Luleå HF	SHL	55	2	4	6	12	6	0	0	0	0
2014–15	Luleå HF	SHL	54	3	6	9	4	9	1	0	1	6
2015–16	Luleå HF	SHL	47	4	8	12	6	11	0	0	0	0
2016–17	Luleå HF	SHL	52	6	6	12	2	2	0	0	0	0
2017–18	Luleå HF	SHL	52	5	6	11	6	3	0	0	0	0
2018–19	Luleå HF	SHL	52	10	8	18	16	10	1	5	6	0
2019–20	Luleå HF	SHL	52	5	7	12	12	—	—	—	—	—
2020–21	Luleå HF	SHL	51	6	7	13	12	7	0	1	1	4
2021–22	Heilbronner Falken	DEL2	45	10	14	24	12	10	2	3	5	0
SHL totals			905	108	141	249	285	120	8	13	21	40

=== International ===
Year	Team	Event	Result	GP	G	A	Pts	PIM
2008	Sweden	WC	4th	9	1	3	4	6
Senior totals				9	1	3	4	6
