= 2013–14 SHL season =

- League: Swedish Hockey League
- Sport: Ice hockey
- Duration: 14 September 2013 – 21 April 2014
- Number of games: 55 (330 total)
- Number of teams: 12
- Total attendance: 1,974,388
- Average attendance: 5,983

Regular season
- League champion: Skellefteå AIK
- Season MVP: Joakim Lindström (Skellefteå AIK)
- Top scorer: Pär Arlbrandt (Linköpings HC)

Playoffs
- Playoffs MVP: Joakim Lindström (Skellefteå AIK)

Finals
- Champions: Skellefteå AIK
- Runners-up: Färjestad BK

SHL seasons
- ← 2012–13 2014–15 →

The 2013–14 SHL season was the 39th season of the Swedish Hockey League (SHL). The regular season began on 14 September 2013 and ended on 8 March 2014. The following playoffs began on 15 March 2014 and ended on 21 April 2014. It was the first season since the league changed name from Elitserien to Swedish Hockey League in June 2013.

Skellefteå AIK defended their 2013 Swedish Championship title by defeating Färjestad BK four games to zero in the Finals. Skellefteå AIK became the first team to defend the Swedish Championship title since Djurgårdens IF did so with their consecutive Swedish Championship titles in 2000 and 2001. Skellefteå AIK also became the first team since Brynäs IF in 1976–77 to win consecutive Swedish Championships by not losing a single game in both Finals series.

A number of format changes were introduced this season. Instead of the top eight teams in the regular season qualifying for the playoffs and the teams ranked 9–10 ending their season, the top six teams qualified for the playoffs directly, and the four teams ranked 7–10 played a best-of-three series and battled for the two remaining playoff spots. The two teams ranked 11–12 still had to play in the Kvalserien round-robin tournament in order to requalify for the SHL. Also, the top three teams no longer got to pick their opponents in the quarterfinals; instead, the first-ranked team faced the lowest-ranked winner of the two best-of-three series, the second-ranked team faced the other winner of the two best-of-three-series, the third-ranked team faced the sixth-ranked team, and the fourth-ranked team faced the fifth-ranked team.

In Kvalserien, Örebro HK requalified and Djurgårdens IF qualified for the 2014–15 SHL season at the expense of AIK.

== Participating teams ==
SHL team map

| Team | City | Arena | Capacity |
|---|---|---|---|
| AIK | Stockholm | Hovet | 8,094 |
| Brynäs IF | Gävle | Läkerol Arena | 8,585 |
| Frölunda HC | Gothenburg | Scandinavium | 12,044 |
| Färjestad BK | Karlstad | Löfbergs Arena | 8,647 |
| HV71 | Jönköping | Kinnarps Arena | 7,000 |
| Leksands IF | Leksand | Tegera Arena | 7,650 |
| Linköpings HC | Linköping | Cloetta Center | 8,500 |
| Luleå HF | Luleå | Coop Norrbotten Arena | 6,300 |
| Modo Hockey | Örnsköldsvik | Fjällräven Center | 7,600 |
| Skellefteå AIK | Skellefteå | Skellefteå Kraft Arena | 6,001 |
| Växjö Lakers | Växjö | Vida Arena | 5,700 |
| Örebro HK | Örebro | Behrn Arena | 5,200 |

== League changes ==
Similar to the system in the Finnish Liiga, only the top six teams qualified directly for the playoffs. The four teams ranked 7–10 played a best-of-three series, known as Play In, in order to qualify for the playoffs. The seventh-ranked team faced the tenth-ranked team and the eighth-ranked team faced the ninth-ranked team, with the better-ranked teams receiving home advantage in two games if necessary to determine a winner of the series. The winners of these two best-of-three series took the two remaining playoff spots. The teams ranked 11–12 were still forced to play in the Kvalserien in order to requalify for the next season of the SHL.

From this season, the ability for the top three teams to pick their opponents in the quarterfinals was dropped; instead, the first-ranked team faced the lowest-ranked winner of the two best-of-three series, the second-ranked team faced the other winner of the two best-of-three series, the third-ranked team faced the sixth-ranked team, and the fourth-ranked team faced the fifth-ranked team.

== Summary ==
This season's outdoor game was played on December 14, 2013, between Frölunda HC and Skellefteå AIK at Gamla Ullevi, Gothenburg. The game was won by Skellefteå 4–1 in front of 13,452 spectators. It was the second SHL outdoor game to be hosted in Gothenburg, Sweden's second largest city, as well as the second SHL outdoor game featuring Frölunda HC.

On February 8, 2014, Leksands IF defenceman Patrik Hersley scored his 22nd goal of the season. With this, he broke the previous record for the number of goals by a defenceman in an SHL regular season, set by Jan Huokko in the 1998–99 season with 21 goals. Hersley added another two goals to finish the regular season with 24 goals. He was awarded the Salming Trophy, as the SHL's best defenceman, for his performance.

Linköpings HC forward Pär Arlbrandt finished the season with 71 points, becoming the third player in league history (after Håkan Loob and Bud Holloway) to score 70 points in a regular season.

== Regular season ==
=== Standings ===
Updated as of March 8, 2014.

| 2013–14 SHL season | GP | W | L | OTW | OTL | GF | GA | GD | Pts |
|---|---|---|---|---|---|---|---|---|---|
| Skellefteå AIK^{y} | 55 | 32 | 12 | 4 | 7 | 179 | 121 | +58 | 111 |
| Frölunda HC^{x} | 55 | 29 | 15 | 4 | 7 | 153 | 123 | +30 | 102 |
| Växjö Lakers^{x} | 55 | 23 | 14 | 7 | 11 | 156 | 130 | +26 | 94 |
| Brynäs IF^{x} | 55 | 19 | 19 | 11 | 6 | 163 | 152 | +11 | 85 |
| Färjestad BK^{x} | 55 | 21 | 19 | 7 | 8 | 143 | 134 | +9 | 85 |
| Luleå HF^{x} | 55 | 22 | 21 | 6 | 6 | 136 | 115 | +21 | 84 |
| Leksands IF^{p} | 55 | 23 | 23 | 5 | 4 | 118 | 155 | –37 | 83 |
| Modo Hockey^{p} | 55 | 18 | 20 | 10 | 7 | 131 | 132 | –1 | 81 |
| Linköpings HC^{p} | 55 | 20 | 24 | 7 | 4 | 174 | 167 | +7 | 78 |
| HV71^{p} | 55 | 17 | 27 | 9 | 2 | 146 | 182 | –36 | 71 |
| Örebro HK^{r} | 55 | 13 | 25 | 5 | 12 | 119 | 160 | –41 | 61 |
| AIK^{r} | 55 | 12 | 30 | 6 | 7 | 124 | 171 | –47 | 55 |

x – clinched playoff spot; y – clinched regular season league title; p – qualified for Play In; r – play in relegation series

=== Statistics ===
==== Scoring leaders ====
List shows the ten best skaters based on the number of points during the regular season. If two or more skaters are tied (i.e. same number of points, goals and played games), all of the tied skaters are shown. Updated as of the end of the regular season.
GP = Games played; G = Goals; A = Assists; Pts = Points; +/– = Plus/minus; PIM = Penalty minutes

| Player | Team | GP | G | A | Pts | +/– | PIM |
|---|---|---|---|---|---|---|---|
| (Sweden) Pär Arlbrandt | Linköpings HC | 53 | 26 | 45 | 71 | +5 | 66 |
| (Sweden) Joakim Lindström | Skellefteå AIK | 55 | 23 | 40 | 63 | +15 | 72 |
| (Sweden) Linus Klasen | Luleå HF | 54 | 28 | 29 | 57 | +13 | 45 |
| (Sweden) Simon Hjalmarsson | Linköpings HC | 55 | 27 | 30 | 57 | 0 | 87 |
| (United States) Chad Kolarik | Linköpings HC | 53 | 30 | 18 | 48 | 0 | 64 |
| (Sweden) Oscar Möller | Skellefteå AIK | 48 | 27 | 18 | 45 | +13 | 14 |
| (Sweden) Joakim Hillding | Färjestad BK | 55 | 18 | 23 | 41 | +7 | 22 |
| (United States) Ryan Gunderson | Brynäs IF | 54 | 8 | 33 | 41 | +13 | 14 |
| (Sweden) Viktor Arvidsson | Skellefteå AIK | 50 | 16 | 24 | 40 | +4 | 59 |
| (Sweden) Dennis Rasmussen | Växjö Lakers | 52 | 16 | 24 | 40 | +6 | 20 |

==== Leading goaltenders ====
These are the leaders in GAA among goaltenders who played at least 40% of the team's minutes. The table is sorted by GAA, and the criteria for inclusion are bolded. Updated as of the end of the regular season.

GP = Games played; TOI = Time on ice (minutes); GA = Goals against; SO = Shutouts; Sv% = Save percentage; GAA = Goals against average

| Player | Team | GP | TOI | GA | SO | Sv% | GAA |
|---|---|---|---|---|---|---|---|
| (Sweden) David Rautio | Luleå HF | 34 | 2019:02 | 60 | 4 | .922 | 1.78 |
| (Sweden) Linus Fernström | Frölunda HC | 32 | 1765:33 | 60 | 2 | .916 | 2.04 |
| (Sweden) Lars Johansson | Frölunda HC | 28 | 1533:01 | 52 | 1 | .912 | 2.04 |
| (Sweden) Markus Svensson | Skellefteå AIK | 34 | 1904:41 | 65 | 5 | .919 | 2.05 |
| (Canada) Scott Munroe | Växjö Lakers | 36 | 2107:37 | 72 | 3 | .913 | 2.05 |
| (Sweden) Fredrik Pettersson-Wentzel | Färjestad BK | 37 | 2217:47 | 76 | 5 | .926 | 2.06 |
| (Sweden) Linus Ullmark | Modo Hockey | 35 | 2043:30 | 71 | 3 | .931 | 2.08 |
| (Sweden) Oscar Alsenfelt | Leksands IF | 46 | 2707:24 | 106 | 4 | .928 | 2.35 |
| (Sweden) Daniel Larsson | AIK | 45 | 2604:10 | 114 | 0 | .917 | 2.63 |
| (Sweden) Tim Sandberg | Örebro HK | 38 | 2256:11 | 99 | 1 | .899 | 2.63 |

== Playoffs ==
This season, only the top six teams qualified directly for the playoffs. The four teams ranked 7–10 played a best-of-three series and battled for the two remaining playoff spots. Also, the top three teams no longer got to pick their opponents in the quarterfinals.

=== Play In ===
The teams ranked 7 and 10, and the teams ranked 8 and 9, respectively, faced each other in a best-of-three series in order to qualify for the playoffs. The better-ranked teams in the two series received home advantage, i.e. two home games, if necessary to determine a winner of the series. The two winners, HV71 and Linköpings HC, took the two remaining playoff spots.

==== (7) Leksands IF vs. (10) HV71 ====
| March 10 | **HV71** | **4–2** | Leksands IF | Kinnarps Arena | Recap |
| Patrik Carlsson 1 – 12:30 | | **First period** | No scoring |
| Patrik Carlsson 2 – 10:42 | | **Second period** | 11:21 – pp – Johan Ryno 1 |
| Kevin Fiala 1 – 1:30; Andreas Jämtin 1 – pp – 17:50 | | **Third period** | 2:19 – Kevin Kapstad 1 |
| Gustaf Wesslau 19 saves / 21 shots | | **Goalie stats** | Oscar Alsenfelt 42 saves / 46 shots |

| March 12 | **Leksands IF** | **2–1** | HV71 | Tegera Arena | Recap |
| No scoring | | **First period** | 17:15 – Anssi Salmela 1 |
| Patrik Hersley 1 – pp – 10:26 | | **Second period** | No scoring |
| Johan Ryno 2 – 6:47 | | **Third period** | No scoring |
| Oscar Alsenfelt 36 saves / 37 shots | | **Goalie stats** | Gustaf Wesslau 24 saves / 26 shots |

| March 13 | Leksands IF | **2–4** | **HV71** | Tegera Arena | Recap |
| No scoring | | **First period** | 6:37 – Ted Brithén 1; 14:37 – Johan Lindström 1; 17:33 – Erik Christensen 1 |
| No scoring | | **Second period** | No scoring |
| Martin Grönberg 1 – 10:02; Jacob Blomqvist 1 – 11:12 | | **Third period** | 3:02 – William Karlsson 1 |
| Oscar Alsenfelt 30 saves / 34 shots | | **Goalie stats** | Gustaf Wesslau 31 saves / 33 shots |

| **HV71 won series 2–1** |

==== (8) Modo Hockey vs. (9) Linköpings HC ====
| March 10 | **Linköpings HC** | **4–0** | Modo Hockey | Cloetta Center | Recap |
| Eric Himelfarb 1 – pp – 2:23 | | **First period** | No scoring |
| Mattias Sjögren 1 – 9:14; Oscar Sundh 1 – 13:45; Chad Kolarik 1 – pp – 18.53 | | **Second period** | No scoring |
| No scoring | | **Third period** | No scoring |
| Marcus Högberg 29 saves / 29 shots | | **Goalie stats** | Linus Ullmark 35 saves / 39 shots |

| March 12 | Modo Hockey | 4–5 | **OT** | **Linköpings HC** | Fjällräven Center | Recap |
| Simon Önerud 1 – 8:56; Niklas Nordgren 1 – 13:22 | | First period | | No scoring |
| Richie Regehr 1 – 0:43; Mattias Ritola 1 – 1:37 | | Second period | | 13:41 – Simon Hjalmarsson 1 |
| No scoring | | Third period | | 4:15 – Eric Himelfarb 2; 12:00 – pp – Mattias Sjögren 2; 12:14 – pp – Joachim Rohdin 1 |
| No scoring | | First overtime period | | 7:15 – pp – Chad Kolarik 2 |
| Linus Ullmark 45 saves / 50 shots | | Goalie stats | | Marcus Högberg 18 saves / 21 shots Christian Engstrand 18 saves / 19 shots |

| **Linköpings HC won series 2–0** |

=== Playoff bracket ===
In the first round, the top-ranked team faced the lowest-ranked winner of the two best-of-three series, the second-ranked team faced the other winner of the two best-of-three series, the third-ranked team faced the sixth-ranked team, and the fourth-ranked team faced the fifth-ranked team. In the second round, the highest remaining seed was matched against the lowest remaining seed. In each round the higher-seeded team was awarded home advantage. Each series was a best-of-seven series that followed an alternating home team format: the higher-seeded team played at home for games 1 and 3 (plus 5 and 7 if necessary), and the lower-seeded team was at home for games 2 and 4 (plus 6 if necessary).

Quarterfinals
1 | **Skellefteå AIK** | **4**
10 | HV71 | 1
2 | Frölunda HC | 3
9 | **Linköpings HC** | **4**
(Pairings are reseeded after the first round)
3 | **Växjö Lakers** | **4**
6 | Luleå HF | 2
4 | Brynäs IF | 1
5 | **Färjestad BK** | **4**

Semifinals
1 | **Skellefteå AIK** | **4**
9 | Linköpings HC | 1
3 | Växjö Lakers | 2
5 | **Färjestad BK** | **4**

Finals
1 | **Skellefteå AIK** | **4**
5 | Färjestad BK | 0

=== Quarterfinals ===
==== (1) Skellefteå AIK vs. (10) HV71 ====
| March 15 | **Skellefteå AIK** | **3–1** | HV71 | Skellefteå Kraft Arena | Recap |
| No scoring | | **First period** | 7:44 – Patrik Carlsson 1 |
| Jimmie Ericsson 1 – pp – 2:00 | | **Second period** | No scoring |
| Jimmie Ericsson 2 – pp – 4:20; Pierre-Édouard Bellemare 1 – 18:09 | | **Third period** | No scoring |
| Markus Svensson 20 saves / 21 shots | | **Goalie stats** | Gustaf Wesslau 31 saves / 34 shots |

| March 17 | HV71 | **2–3** | **Skellefteå AIK** | Kinnarps Arena | Recap |
| No scoring | | **First period** | 15:09 – pp – Melker Karlsson 1; 19:03 – Adam Pettersson 1 |
| Johan Lindström 1 – 7:34 | | **Second period** | No scoring |
| Toni Rajala 1 – 3:00 | | **Third period** | 19:54 – Fredrik Lindgren 1 |
| Gustaf Wesslau 23 saves / 26 shots | | **Goalie stats** | Markus Svensson 18 saves / 20 shots |

| March 19 | **Skellefteå AIK** | **6–4** | HV71 | Skellefteå Kraft Arena | Recap |
| Pierre-Édouard Bellemare 2 – pp – 2:00; Joakim Lindström 1 – pp – 4:44; Pierre-Édouard Bellemare 3 – 15:08 | | **First period** | No scoring |
| Jimmie Ericsson 3 – pp – 14:13 | | **Second period** | 16:41 – Erik Christensen 1 |
| Jimmie Ericsson 4 – 0:18; Oscar Möller 1 – pp2 – 11:02 | | **Third period** | 10:10 – sh – Anton Bengtsson 1; 13:50 – William Karlsson 1; 17:24 – William Karlsson 2 |
| Markus Svensson 29 saves / 33 shots | | **Goalie stats** | Gustaf Wesslau 26 saves / 32 shots |

| March 21 | **HV71** | 2–1 | **2OT** | Skellefteå AIK | Kinnarps Arena | Recap |
| Erik Christensen 2 – 10:38 | | First period | | No scoring |
| No scoring | | Second period | | No scoring |
| No scoring | | Third period | | 16:51 – Bud Holloway 1 |
| Erik Christensen 3 – 12:53 | | Second overtime period | | No scoring |
| Gustaf Wesslau 29 saves / 30 shots | | Goalie stats | | Markus Svensson 35 saves / 37 shots |

| March 23 | **Skellefteå AIK** | **3–1** | HV71 | Skellefteå Kraft Arena | Recap |
| No scoring | | **First period** | No scoring |
| Petter Emanuelsson 1 – 11:24; Jimmie Ericsson 5 – pp – 17:33 | | **Second period** | No scoring |
| Viktor Arvidsson 1 – pp – 3:06 | | **Third period** | 6:18 – Ted Brithén 1 |
| Markus Svensson 29 saves / 30 shots | | **Goalie stats** | Gustaf Wesslau 29 saves / 32 shots |

| **Skellefteå AIK won series 4–1** |

==== (2) Frölunda HC vs. (9) Linköpings HC ====
| March 15 | **Frölunda HC** | **3–2** | Linköpings HC | Scandinavium | Recap |
| Magnus Kahnberg 1 – 14:02 | | **First period** | No scoring |
| No scoring | | **Second period** | No scoring |
| Joel Lundqvist 1 – 12:02; Max Görtz 1 – 13:22 | | **Third period** | 1:49 – Jakub Vrána 1; 8:00 – Chad Kolarik 1 |
| Linus Fernström 21 saves / 23 shots | | **Goalie stats** | Marcus Högberg 45 saves / 48 shots |

| March 17 | **Linköpings HC** | 2–1 | **2OT** | Frölunda HC | Cloetta Center | Recap |
| Eric Himelfarb 1 – 7:44 | | First period | | No scoring |
| No scoring | | Second period | | 13:44 – Anton Axelsson 1 |
| No scoring | | Third period | | No scoring |
| Chad Kolarik 2 – 3:55 | | Second overtime period | | No scoring |
| Marcus Högberg 29 saves / 30 shots | | Goalie stats | | Lars Johansson 28 saves / 30 shots |

| March 19 | Frölunda HC | **1–3** | **Linköpings HC** | Scandinavium | Recap |
| No scoring | | **First period** | 15:40 – Johannes Salmonsson 1; 18:58 – Jonas Almtorp 1 |
| No scoring | | **Second period** | No scoring |
| Anton Axelsson 2 – 14:58 | | **Third period** | 19:37 – en – Johannes Salmonsson 2 |
| Linus Fernström 8 saves / 10 shots | | **Goalie stats** | Marcus Högberg 29 saves / 30 shots |

| March 21 | Linköpings HC | **2–3** | **Frölunda HC** | Cloetta Center | Recap |
| Simon Hjalmarsson 1 – 0:29 | | **First period** | 6:17 – Nicklas Lasu 1; 7:38 – Andreas Johnson 1 |
| No scoring | | **Second period** | 18:25 – pp – Mikael Wikstrand 1 |
| Mark Matheson 1 – 6:36 | | **Third period** | No scoring |
| Marcus Högberg 16 saves / 19 shots Christian Engstrand 6 saves / 6 shots | | **Goalie stats** | Lars Johansson 28 saves / 30 shots |

| March 23 | **Frölunda HC** | **6–2** | Linköpings HC | Scandinavium | Recap |
| Erik Karlsson 1 – 3:17 | | **First period** | No scoring |
| Christian Bäckman 1 – 15:46 | | **Second period** | 4:55 – Pär Arlbrandt 1 |
| Mathis Olimb 1 – 2:12; Nicklas Lasu 2 – 5:10; Anton Blidh 1 – 16:29; Max Görtz 2 – 19:21 | | **Third period** | 11:26 – Oscar Sundh 1 |
| Lars Johansson 23 saves / 25 shots | | **Goalie stats** | Marcus Högberg 22 saves / 28 shots |

| March 25 | **Linköpings HC** | **5–3** | Frölunda HC | Cloetta Center | Recap |
| Carl Dahlström 1 – 18:41 | | **First period** | 9:49 – Alexander Wennberg 1 |
| Pär Arlbrandt 2 – 15:09 | | **Second period** | No scoring |
| Simon Hjalmarsson 2 – 3:30; Pär Arlbrandt 3 – 3:47; Chad Kolarik 3 – 12:05 | | **Third period** | 13:56 – Dick Axelsson 1; 16:27 – pp – Max Görtz 3 |
| Christian Engstrand 26 saves / 29 shots | | **Goalie stats** | Lars Johansson 14 saves / 18 shots Linus Fernström 3 saves / 4 shots |

| March 27 | Frölunda HC | **0–2** | **Linköpings HC** | Scandinavium | Recap |
| No scoring | | **First period** | 8:43 – Jonas Almtorp 2 |
| No scoring | | **Second period** | 7:19 – Kent McDonell 1 |
| No scoring | | **Third period** | No scoring |
| Lars Johansson 20 saves / 22 shots | | **Goalie stats** | Christian Engstrand 24 saves / 24 shots |

| **Linköpings HC won series 4–3** |

==== (3) Växjö Lakers vs. (6) Luleå HF ====
| March 16 | **Växjö Lakers** | **4–0** | Luleå HF | Vida Arena | Recap |
| Liam Reddox 1 – 6:52; Alexander Johansson 1 – 8:08 | | **First period** | No scoring |
| Rhett Rakhshani 1 – 9:22 | | **Second period** | No scoring |
| Alexander Johansson 2 – en – 19:29 | | **Third period** | No scoring |
| Teemu Lassila 21 saves / 21 shots | | **Goalie stats** | David Rautio 23 saves / 26 shots |

| March 18 | Luleå HF | **2–3** | **Växjö Lakers** | Coop Norrbotten Arena | Recap |
| No scoring | | **First period** | 19:17 – Noah Welch 1 |
| Daniel Gunnarsson 1 – pp – 17:38 | | **Second period** | 10:19 – Jan Hlaváč 1; 18:07 – Jani Lajunen 1 |
| Linus Klasen 1 – 18:33 | | **Third period** | No scoring |
| Mark Owuya 17 saves / 20 shots | | **Goalie stats** | Teemu Lassila 32 saves / 34 shots |

| March 20 | Växjö Lakers | 3–4 | **OT** | **Luleå HF** | Vida Arena | Recap |
| No scoring | | First period | | 9:53 – pp – Linus Persson |
| No scoring | | Second period | | 10:05 – pp – Linus Klasen 2 |
| Jan Hlaváč 2 – pp – 6:23; Erik Josefsson 1 – pp – 9:57; Alexander Johansson 3 – 17:47 | | Third period | | 4:17 – Dean Kukan 1 |
| No scoring | | First overtime period | | 10:23 – Niklas Olausson 1 |
| Teemu Lassila 19 saves / 23 shots | | Goalie stats | | David Rautio 28 saves / 31 shots |

| March 22 | **Luleå HF** | **5–4** | Växjö Lakers | Coop Norrbotten Arena | Recap |
| Linus Omark 1 – pp – 11:34 | | **First period** | No scoring |
| Anton Hedman 1 – 2:20; Daniel Mannberg 1 – 13:16 | | **Second period** | 4:42 – Alexander Johansson 4; 5:11 – Noah Welch 2; 12:21 – pp – Cory Murphy 1 |
| Linus Omark 2 – 1:42; Lars Bryggman 1 – 11:48 | | **Third period** | 5:48 – Dennis Rasmussen 1 |
| David Rautio 21 saves / 25 shots | | **Goalie stats** | Scott Munroe 12 saves / 15 shots Teemu Lassila 8 saves / 10 shots |

| March 24 | **Växjö Lakers** | **2–0** | Luleå HF | Vida Arena | Recap |
| No scoring | | **First period** | No scoring |
| Dennis Rasmussen 2 – 5:06 | | **Second period** | No scoring |
| Rhett Rakhshani 2 – 14:06 | | **Third period** | No scoring |
| Teemu Lassila 22 saves / 22 shots | | **Goalie stats** | Mark Owuya 20 saves / 22 shots |

| March 26 | Luleå HF | **0–1** | **Växjö Lakers** | Coop Norrbotten Arena | Recap |
| No scoring | | **First period** | 18:10 – Erik Josefsson 2 |
| No scoring | | **Second period** | No scoring |
| No scoring | | **Third period** | No scoring |
| Mark Owuya 12 saves / 13 shots | | **Goalie stats** | Teemu Lassila 19 saves / 19 shots |

| **Växjö Lakers won series 4–2** |

==== (4) Brynäs IF vs. (5) Färjestad BK ====
| March 16 | Brynäs IF | **1–2** | **Färjestad BK** | Läkerol Arena | Recap |
| Anton Rödin 1 – 11:45 | | **First period** | No scoring |
| No scoring | | **Second period** | 8:35 – Patrik Lundh 1 |
| No scoring | | **Third period** | 17:25 – Joakim Hillding 1 |
| Bernhard Starkbaum 33 saves / 35 shots | | **Goalie stats** | Fredrik Pettersson-Wentzel 34 saves / 35 shots |

| March 18 | **Färjestad BK** | **4–2** | Brynäs IF | Löfbergs Arena | Recap |
| Magnus Nygren 1 – pp – 2:05; Linus Fröberg 1 – 11:41; Milan Gulaš 1 – 16:33 | | **First period** | No scoring |
| No scoring | | **Second period** | 4:41 – pp – Anton Rödin 2 |
| Martin Røymark 1 – en – 19:36 | | **Third period** | 15:31 – Johan Harju 1 |
| Fredrik Pettersson-Wentzel 25 saves / 27 shots | | **Goalie stats** | Bernhard Starkbaum 28 saves / 31 shots |

| March 20 | Brynäs IF | **1–2** | **Färjestad BK** | Läkerol Arena | Recap |
| No scoring | | **First period** | 19:56 – Joakim Hillding 2 |
| Daniel Brodin 1 – 13:28 | | **Second period** | No scoring |
| No scoring | | **Third period** | 11:44 – Linus Fröberg 2 |
| Bernhard Starkbaum 33 saves / 35 shots | | **Goalie stats** | Fredrik Pettersson-Wentzel 35 saves / 36 shots |

| March 22 | Färjestad BK | **0–2** | **Brynäs IF** | Löfbergs Arena | Recap |
| No scoring | | **First period** | 11:40 – Bill Sweatt 1 |
| No scoring | | **Second period** | 13:49 – Jesper Ollas 1 |
| No scoring | | **Third period** | No scoring |
| Fredrik Pettersson-Wentzel 23 saves / 25 shots | | **Goalie stats** | Bernhard Starkbaum 33 saves / 33 shots |

| March 24 | Brynäs IF | 3–4 | **OT** | **Färjestad BK** | Läkerol Arena | Recap |
| Johan Harju 2 – pp – 10:55 | | First period | | No scoring |
| Christian Djoos 1 – 4:57 | | Second period | | 4:13 – Joakim Hillding 3; 13:07 – Per Åslund 1 |
| Greg Scott 1 – pp – 15:38 | | Third period | | 2:13 – Milan Gulaš 2 |
| No scoring | | First overtime period | | 8:27 – Patrik Lundh 2 |
| Bernhard Starkbaum 34 saves / 38 shots | | Goalie stats | | Fredrik Pettersson-Wentzel 25 saves / 28 shots |

| **Färjestad BK won series 4–1** |

=== Semifinals ===
==== (1) Skellefteå AIK vs. (9) Linköpings HC ====
| March 31 | **Skellefteå AIK** | **3–0** | Linköpings HC | Skellefteå Kraft Arena | Recap |
| Joakim Lindström 2 – pp – 4:57; Oscar Möller 2 – 11:45 | | **First period** | No scoring |
| No scoring | | **Second period** | No scoring |
| Melker Karlsson 2 – en – 18:04 | | **Third period** | No scoring |
| Markus Svensson 20 saves / 20 shots | | **Goalie stats** | Christian Engstrand 25 saves / 27 shots |

| April 2 | Linköpings HC | **2–8** | **Skellefteå AIK** | Cloetta Center | Recap |
| Jonas Junland 1 – 17:34; Simon Hjalmarsson 3 – pp – 19:29 | | **First period** | 7:37 – John Norman 1; 8:50 – Oscar Möller 3; 10:51 – Joakim Lindström 3; 18:07 – Oscar Möller 4 |
| No scoring | | **Second period** | 9:24 – pp – Joakim Lindström 4; 10:18 – Petter Emanuelsson 2; 18:54 – pp – Pierre-Édouard Bellemare 4 |
| No scoring | | **Third period** | 8:15 – sh – Erik Andersson 1 |
| Marcus Högberg 6 saves / 8 shots Christian Engstrand 23 saves / 29 shots | | **Goalie stats** | Markus Svensson 16 saves / 18 shots |

| April 4 | **Skellefteå AIK** | **4–1** | Linköpings HC | Skellefteå Kraft Arena | Recap |
| No scoring | | **First period** | 8:23 – Simon Hjalmarsson 4 |
| Jimmie Ericsson 6 – pp2 – 3:27 | | **Second period** | No scoring |
| Viktor Arvidsson 2 – 11:01; Bud Holloway 2 – 15:36; Oskar Sundqvist 1 – pp, en – 18:25 | | **Third period** | No scoring |
| Markus Svensson 24 saves / 25 shots | | **Goalie stats** | Marcus Högberg 36 saves / 39 shots |

| April 6 | **Linköpings HC** | **1–0** | Skellefteå AIK | Cloetta Center | Recap |
| Jonas Junland 2 – 19:32 | | **First period** | No scoring |
| No scoring | | **Second period** | No scoring |
| No scoring | | **Third period** | No scoring |
| Marcus Högberg 37 saves / 37 shots | | **Goalie stats** | Markus Svensson 24 saves / 25 shots |

| April 8 | **Skellefteå AIK** | **7–3** | Linköpings HC | Skellefteå Kraft Arena | Recap |
| Niclas Burström 1 – 12:45; Viktor Arvidsson 3 – pp – 14:47; Jimmie Ericsson 7 – 19:19 | | **First period** | No scoring |
| Pierre-Édouard Bellemare 5 – 9:54 | | **Second period** | 9:05 – Chad Kolarik 4; 17:51 – Mattias Sjögren 1 |
| Jimmie Ericsson 8 – 5:30; Oskar Sundqvist 2 – 11:59; Erik Forssell 1 – en – 17:02 | | **Third period** | 11:33 – Johannes Salmonsson 3 |
| Markus Svensson 24 saves / 27 shots | | **Goalie stats** | Marcus Högberg 27 saves / 33 shots |

| **Skellefteå AIK won series 4–1** |

==== (3) Växjö Lakers vs. (5) Färjestad BK ====
| April 1 | Växjö Lakers | **1–2** | **Färjestad BK** | Vida Arena | Recap |
| No scoring | | **First period** | No scoring |
| Jan Hlaváč 3 – 16:17 | | **Second period** | No scoring |
| No scoring | | **Third period** | 7:09 – Pontus Åberg 1; 11:07 – Per Åslund 2 |
| Teemu Lassila 21 saves / 23 shots | | **Goalie stats** | Fredrik Pettersson-Wentzel 31 saves / 32 shots |

| April 3 | Färjestad BK | **1–6** | **Växjö Lakers** | Löfbergs Arena | Recap |
| Rickard Wallin 1 – 5:06 | | **First period** | 15:15 – Ryan Lasch 1 |
| No scoring | | **Second period** | 7:55 – Alexander Johansson 5; 9:42 – Robert Rosén 1; 17:01 – Robert Rosén 2 |
| No scoring | | **Third period** | 8:27 – Robert Rosén 3; 13:48 – pp – Rhett Rakhshani 3 |
| Fredrik Pettersson-Wentzel 23 saves / 29 shots Pekka Tuokkola 0 saves / 0 shots | | **Goalie stats** | Teemu Lassila 23 saves / 24 shots |

| April 5 | Växjö Lakers | **1–4** | **Färjestad BK** | Vida Arena | Recap |
| Robert Rosén 4 – pp – 10:28 | | **First period** | 11:45 – pp – Magnus Nygren 2 |
| No scoring | | **Second period** | 12:53 – Milan Gulaš 3 |
| No scoring | | **Third period** | 19:07 – en – Rickard Wallin 2; 19:47 – en – Patrik Lundh 3 |
| Teemu Lassila 24 saves / 26 shots | | **Goalie stats** | Fredrik Pettersson-Wentzel 27 saves / 28 shots |

| April 7 | Färjestad BK | 1–2 | **OT** | **Växjö Lakers** | Löfbergs Arena | Recap |
| No scoring | | First period | | No scoring |
| No scoring | | Second period | | 1:56 – sh – Jan Hlaváč 4 |
| Linus Fröberg 3 – pp – 12:46 | | Third period | | No scoring |
| No scoring | | First overtime period | | 14:27 – Alexander Johansson 6 |
| Fredrik Pettersson-Wentzel 30 saves / 32 shots | | Goalie stats | | Teemu Lassila 26 saves / 27 shots |

| April 9 | Växjö Lakers | **2–3** | **Färjestad BK** | Vida Arena | Recap |
| No scoring | | **First period** | 0:10 – Patrik Lundh 4 |
| Malte Strömwall 1 – 8:56 | | **Second period** | No scoring |
| Robert Rosén 5 – pp – 13:30 | | **Third period** | 10:58 – Milan Gulaš 4; 11:56 – Jack Connolly 1 |
| Teemu Lassila 17 saves / 20 shots | | **Goalie stats** | Fredrik Pettersson-Wentzel 42 saves / 44 shots |

| April 11 | **Färjestad BK** | 3–2 | **OT** | Växjö Lakers | Löfbergs Arena | Recap |
| No scoring | | First period | | No scoring |
| No scoring | | Second period | | 9:02 – Robert Rosén 6 |
| Rickard Wallin 3 – 1:35; Milan Gulaš 5 – 19:11 | | Third period | | 5:47 – Johan Markusson 1 |
| Rickard Wallin 4 – 9:04 | | First overtime period | | No scoring |
| Fredrik Pettersson-Wentzel 38 saves / 40 shots | | Goalie stats | | Teemu Lassila 33 saves / 36 shots |

| **Färjestad BK won series 4–2** |

=== Finals: (1) Skellefteå AIK vs. (5) Färjestad BK ===
Skellefteå AIK made their fourth consecutive appearance in the Finals, following Finals appearances in 2011, 2012, and 2013. Färjestad BK reached the Finals for the first time since 2011, and became the first team seeded lower than fourth in the regular season to reach the Finals since sixth-seeded Modo Hockey made it to the Finals in 2000.

Skellefteå AIK swept Färjestad BK four games to zero and secured their third Swedish Championship title in club history, following titles in 1978 and 2013, the year before. Skellefteå AIK became the first team to defend the Swedish Championship title since Djurgårdens IF did so with their consecutive Swedish Championship titles in 2000 and 2001. Skellefteå AIK also became the first team since Brynäs IF in 1976–77 to win consecutive Swedish Championships by not losing a single game in both Finals series. Their 8–1 crush in game three marked the biggest goal margin (7 goals) in a single Finals game in SHL history. Over the four games, Skellefteå racked up the goal differential 20–3.

| April 15 | **Skellefteå AIK** | **3–0** | Färjestad BK | Skellefteå Kraft Arena | Recap |
| Jimmie Ericsson 9 – pp – 6:53; Joakim Lindström 5 – 10:54 | | **First period** | No scoring |
| Pierre-Édouard Bellemare 6 – pp – 18:11 | | **Second period** | No scoring |
| No scoring | | **Third period** | No scoring |
| Markus Svensson 21 saves / 21 shots | | **Goalie stats** | Fredrik Pettersson-Wentzel 22 saves / 25 shots |

| April 17 | Färjestad BK | **2–6** | **Skellefteå AIK** | Löfbergs Arena | Recap |
| No scoring | | **First period** | 19:02 – pp – Bud Holloway 3 |
| Christian Berglund 1 – 7:43 | | **Second period** | 13:39 – Pierre-Édouard Bellemare 7 |
| Anders Bastiansen 1 – sh – 13:31 | | **Third period** | 3:26 – Jimmie Ericsson 10; 11:07 – John Norman 2; 11:32 – Oskar Sundqvist 3; 19:41 – en – Oscar Möller 5 |
| Fredrik Pettersson-Wentzel 26 saves / 31 shots Pekka Tuokkola 6 saves / 6 shots | | **Goalie stats** | Markus Svensson 27 saves / 29 shots |

| April 19 | **Skellefteå AIK** | **8–1** | Färjestad BK | Skellefteå Kraft Arena | Recap |
| Viktor Arvidsson 4 – 14:43; Jimmie Ericsson 11 – pp – 17:01; Oskar Sundqvist 4 – sh – 19:21 | | **First period** | 10:31 – Pontus Åberg 2 |
| Joakim Lindström 6 – 11:50; Melker Karlsson 3 – 14:10 | | **Second period** | No scoring |
| Melker Karlsson 4 – 0:59; Pierre-Édouard Bellemare 8 – 2:08; Jimmie Ericsson 12 – 3:24 | | **Third period** | No scoring |
| Markus Svensson 20 saves / 21 shots | | **Goalie stats** | Fredrik Pettersson-Wentzel 13 saves / 16 shots Pekka Tuokkola 18 saves / 23 shots |

| April 21 | Färjestad BK | **0–3** | **Skellefteå AIK** | Löfbergs Arena | Recap |
| No scoring | | **First period** | No scoring |
| No scoring | | **Second period** | No scoring |
| No scoring | | **Third period** | 2:46 – Anton Lindholm 1; 17:06 – pp – Pierre-Édouard Bellemare 9; 18:18 – en – Martin Lundberg 1 |
| Fredrik Pettersson-Wentzel 24 saves / 26 shots | | **Goalie stats** | Markus Svensson 23 saves / 23 shots |

| **Skellefteå AIK won series 4–0** |

=== Statistics ===
==== Scoring leaders ====
List shows the ten best skaters based on the number of points during the playoffs. If two or more skaters are tied (i.e. same number of points, goals and played games), all of the tied skaters are shown. Updated as of the end of the playoffs.
GP = Games played; G = Goals; A = Assists; Pts = Points; +/– = Plus/minus; PIM = Penalty minutes

| Player | Team | GP | G | A | Pts | +/– | PIM |
|---|---|---|---|---|---|---|---|
| (Sweden) Joakim Lindström | Skellefteå AIK | 14 | 6 | 12 | 18 | +11 | 10 |
| (Sweden) Oscar Möller | Skellefteå AIK | 14 | 5 | 13 | 18 | +10 | 2 |
| (Sweden) Viktor Arvidsson | Skellefteå AIK | 14 | 4 | 12 | 16 | +5 | 4 |
| (Sweden) Jimmie Ericsson | Skellefteå AIK | 14 | 12 | 2 | 14 | 0 | 12 |
| (France) Pierre-Édouard Bellemare | Skellefteå AIK | 14 | 9 | 5 | 14 | +4 | 6 |
| (Sweden) Melker Karlsson | Skellefteå AIK | 14 | 4 | 8 | 12 | +9 | 12 |
| (Sweden) Alexander Johansson | Växjö Lakers | 12 | 6 | 4 | 10 | +5 | 14 |
| (United States) Rhett Rakhshani | Växjö Lakers | 12 | 3 | 6 | 9 | +1 | 12 |
| (Canada) Bud Holloway | Skellefteå AIK | 11 | 3 | 5 | 8 | 0 | 6 |
| (Sweden) Robert Rosén | Växjö Lakers | 12 | 6 | 1 | 7 | +4 | 2 |

==== Leading goaltenders ====
These are the leaders in GAA and save percentage among goaltenders who played more than 40% of the team's minutes. The table is sorted by GAA, and the criteria for inclusion are bolded. Updated as of the end of the season.

GP = Games played; TOI = Time on ice (minutes); GA = Goals against; SO = Shutouts; Sv% = Save percentage; GAA = Goals against average

| Player | Team | GP | TOI | GA | SO | Sv% | GAA |
|---|---|---|---|---|---|---|---|
| (Sweden) Markus Svensson | Skellefteå AIK | 14 | 870:37 | 20 | 3 | **.943** | **1.38** |
| (Finland) Teemu Lassila | Växjö Lakers | 12 | 715:51 | 20 | 3 | **.929** | **1.68** |
| (Sweden) Mark Owuya | Luleå HF | 3 | 174:04 | 6 | 0 | .891 | **2.07** |
| (Austria) Bernhard Starkbaum | Brynäs IF | 5 | 303:44 | 11 | 1 | **.936** | **2.17** |
| (Sweden) Lars Johansson | Frölunda HC | 5 | 305:39 | 12 | 0 | .904 | **2.36** |
| (Sweden) Fredrik Pettersson-Wentzel | Färjestad BK | 15 | 876:06 | 36 | 0 | **.921** | 2.47 |
| (Sweden) Marcus Högberg | Linköpings HC | 9 | 488:10 | 25 | 1 | **.908** | 3.07 |

== SHL awards ==
Guldhjälmen: Joakim Lindström, Skellefteå AIK
Guldpucken: Joakim Lindström, Skellefteå AIK
Honken Trophy: Linus Ullmark, Modo Hockey
Håkan Loob Trophy: Chad Kolarik, Linköpings HC
Rookie of the Year: Andreas Johnson, Frölunda HC
Salming Trophy: Patrik Hersley, Leksands IF
Stefan Liv Memorial Trophy: Joakim Lindström, Skellefteå AIK
Guldpipan: Mikael Nord

== See also ==
- 2014 Kvalserien
- List of SHL seasons
- 2013 in ice hockey
- 2014 in ice hockey
