= Joakim Lindström =

Swedish ice hockey player (born 1983)

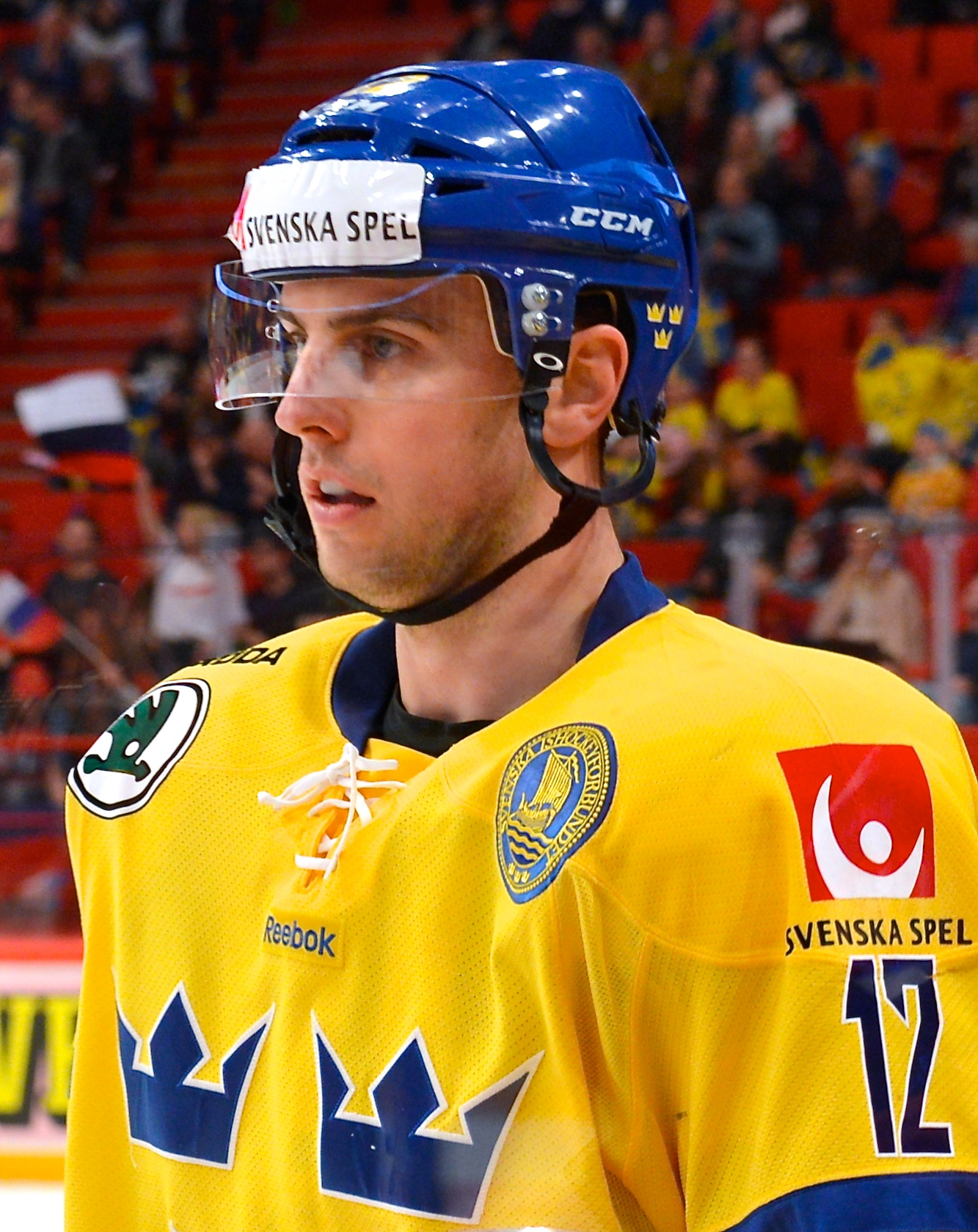
- Lindström with Sweden in 2014
- Born: 5 December 1983 (age 42) Skellefteå, Sweden
- Height: 6 ft 1 in (185 cm)
- Weight: 203 lb (92 kg; 14 st 7 lb)
- Position: Winger
- Shot: Left
- Played for: Modo Hockey; Columbus Blue Jackets; Phoenix Coyotes; Torpedo Nizhny Novgorod; Skellefteå AIK; Colorado Avalanche; St. Louis Blues; Toronto Maple Leafs; SKA Saint Petersburg
- National team: Sweden
- NHL draft: 41st overall, 2002; Columbus Blue Jackets
- Playing career: 2001–2023

Joakim Claes Lindström (born 5 December 1983) is a Swedish former professional ice hockey winger who last played for Skellefteå AIK of the Swedish Hockey League (SHL). Lindström previously played in the National Hockey League (NHL) for the Columbus Blue Jackets, Phoenix Coyotes, Colorado Avalanche, St. Louis Blues and, most recently, for the Toronto Maple Leafs. He was drafted in the second round, 41st overall, by Columbus in 2002.

== Playing career ==
Lindström came through the youth ranks of Skellefteå AIK, before joining the Modo Hockey youth program. He logged his first minutes in the country's top-flight Swedish Hockey League for Modo during the 2000-01 season.

He was drafted 41st overall in the 2002 NHL entry draft by the Columbus Blue Jackets. After spending five years in the Elitserien with Modo, Lindström made his North American debut with the latter stages of the 2004–05 season with the Syracuse Crunch, the top minor league affiliate of the Blue Jackets in the American Hockey League (AHL).

Lindström made his NHL debut the following season, 2005–06, with the Blue Jackets and played in a further 37 games with Columbus before he was traded to the Anaheim Ducks for a conditional draft pick on 15 July 2008.

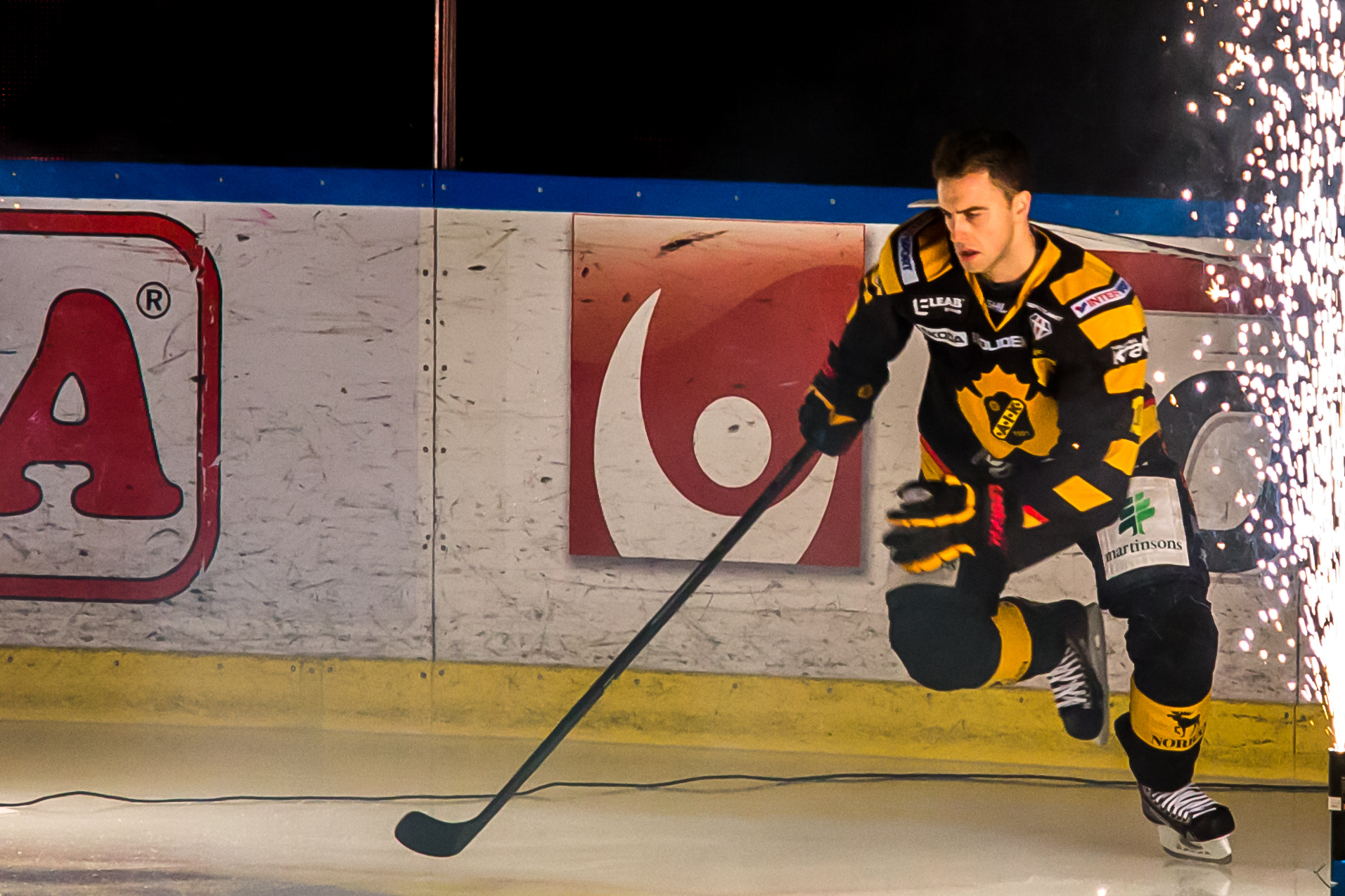
Lindström taking the ice with Skellefteå AIK in 2013.

On 3 October 2008, Lindström was claimed off waivers by the Chicago Blackhawks, but was consequently re-claimed back by the Ducks on 7 October 2008. He was then assigned to the Ducks' top affiliate, the Iowa Chops, of the AHL.

On 3 December 2008, the Ducks traded Lindström to the Phoenix Coyotes in exchange for Logan Stephenson. Lindström was recalled by Phoenix on 8 December 2008, and made his Coyotes debut in a 5–3 win over the Dallas Stars on 10 December 2008.

Lindström was not re-signed by the Coyotes at season's end, and on 13 July 2009, he left North America and signed a one-year contract with Russian team Torpedo Nizhny Novgorod of the Kontinental Hockey League (KHL). In the 2009–10 season, he led the club with 20 assists and scored 30 points, though Torpedo failed to qualify for the post-season.

On 18 May 2010, Lindström returned to the Elitserien, signing with Skellefteå AIK for the 2010–11 season. In 54 games, he scored 60 points to lead the League in scoring as AIK finished as silver medalists in the playoffs. He was also selected to the Elitserien All-Star Team.

On 15 June 2011, Lindström signed a one-year contract to return to the NHL with the Colorado Avalanche. On 29 November 2011, however, Lindström was waived by the Avalanche, whereupon he returned to Skellefteå AIK in Sweden.

On 28 May 2014, after helping Skellefteå to a second consecutive title and being selected as the Swedish Hockey League's MVP, Lindström signed a one-year free agent contract with the St. Louis Blues, marking a third attempt to establish himself within the NHL. In the 2014–15 season, Lindström made the Blues' opening night roster, but was unable to secure a top six position on the Blues' scoring lines. Primarily used as a depth player, Lindström contributed with three goals in 34 games before on 2 March 2015, he was traded by the Blues to the Toronto Maple Leafs, along with a conditional draft pick (Nicolas Mattinen), in exchange for Olli Jokinen.

Lindström's stint in Toronto would be short, as he signed a one-year contract with SKA Saint Petersburg of the KHL shortly after the regular season ended on 1 May 2015. He left Saint Petersburg after the 2015–16 season and signed to return to Skellefteå AIK on 27 April 2016.

== International play ==
Medal record

Representing Sweden

Ice hockey

World Championships
Bronze medal – third place	2014 Belarus	

Lindström earned his first caps for Sweden during the 2009–10 season and played at the 2014 and 2015 World Championships.

During the 2017–18 season, with the exclusion of NHL contracted players, Lindström was selected to represent Sweden at the 2018 Winter Olympics in Pyeongchang, South Korea. Used in a scoring role, he finished scoreless through 4 games in a fifth place finish.

== Career statistics ==
=== Regular season and playoffs ===
			Regular season					Playoffs
Season	Team	League	GP	G	A	Pts	PIM	GP	G	A	Pts	PIM
1999–00	Modo Hockey	J18 Allsv	9	3	10	13	22	8	3	4	7	10
1999–00	Modo Hockey	J20	10	4	4	8	2	—	—	—	—	—
2000–01	Modo Hockey	J18 Allsv	2	1	2	3	16	4	2	3	5	24
2000–01	Modo Hockey	J20	8	6	10	16	16	2	0	2	2	14
2000–01	Modo Hockey	SEL	10	2	3	5	2	7	0	1	1	0
2001–02	Modo Hockey	J20	10	9	6	15	67	—	—	—	—	—
2001–02	Modo Hockey	SEL	42	4	3	7	20	14	3	5	8	8
2001–02	IF Troja/Ljungby	Allsv	3	0	0	0	12	—	—	—	—	—
2002–03	Modo Hockey	J20	2	5	1	6	8	—	—	—	—	—
2002–03	Modo Hockey	SEL	29	4	2	6	14	6	1	1	2	2
2002–03	Örnsköldsviks SK	Allsv	2	1	1	2	4	—	—	—	—	—
2003–04	IF Sundsvall Hockey	Allsv	2	0	5	5	0	—	—	—	—	—
2003–04	Modo Hockey	SEL	15	0	2	2	0	—	—	—	—	—
2004–05	Modo Hockey	J20	2	4	1	5	0	—	—	—	—	—
2004–05	Modo Hockey	SEL	37	2	3	5	24	—	—	—	—	—
2004–05	Syracuse Crunch	AHL	13	4	4	8	0	—	—	—	—	—
2005–06	Syracuse Crunch	AHL	64	14	29	43	52	6	1	1	2	0
2005–06	Columbus Blue Jackets	NHL	3	0	0	0	0	—	—	—	—	—
2006–07	Syracuse Crunch	AHL	50	22	26	48	34	—	—	—	—	—
2006–07	Columbus Blue Jackets	NHL	9	1	0	1	4	—	—	—	—	—
2007–08	Syracuse Crunch	AHL	49	25	35	60	68	13	4	3	7	6
2007–08	Columbus Blue Jackets	NHL	25	3	4	7	14	—	—	—	—	—
2008–09	Iowa Chops	AHL	21	7	14	21	33	—	—	—	—	—
2008–09	San Antonio Rampage	AHL	3	1	1	2	2	—	—	—	—	—
2008–09	Phoenix Coyotes	NHL	44	9	11	20	28	—	—	—	—	—
2009–10	Torpedo Nizhny Novgorod	KHL	55	10	20	30	62	—	—	—	—	—
2010–11	Skellefteå AIK	SEL	54	28	32	60	134	18	4	7	11	16
2011–12	Colorado Avalanche	NHL	16	2	3	5	0	—	—	—	—	—
2011–12	Skellefteå AIK	SEL	21	7	13	20	45	19	5	12	17	22
2012–13	Skellefteå AIK	SEL	53	18	36	54	56	13	4	7	11	4
2013–14	Skellefteå AIK	SHL	55	23	40	63	72	14	6	12	18	10
2014–15	St. Louis Blues	NHL	34	3	3	6	8	—	—	—	—	—
2014–15	Toronto Maple Leafs	NHL	19	1	3	4	4	—	—	—	—	—
2015–16	SKA Saint Petersburg	KHL	47	8	13	21	24	13	0	2	2	10
2016–17	Skellefteå AIK	SHL	51	18	36	54	32	7	2	2	4	4
2017–18	Skellefteå AIK	SHL	46	16	34	50	63	12	3	4	7	29
2018–19	Skellefteå AIK	SHL	48	18	24	42	20	6	3	2	5	0
2019–20	Skellefteå AIK	SHL	47	16	23	39	45	—	—	—	—	—
2020–21	Skellefteå AIK	SHL	52	12	33	45	42	12	4	6	10	35
2021–22	Skellefteå AIK	SHL	52	11	26	37	16	6	4	1	5	4
2022–23	Skellefteå AIK	SHL	47	12	16	28	18	15	2	4	6	12
SHL totals			659	191	326	517	611	149	41	64	105	146
NHL totals			150	19	24	43	58	—	—	—	—	—

=== International ===
Year	Team	Event	Result	GP	G	A	Pts	PIM
2001	Sweden	WJC18	7th	6	2	5	7	2
2003	Sweden	WJC	8th	6	2	3	5	6
2014	Sweden	WC	3rd place, bronze medalist(s)	9	5	6	11	4
2015	Sweden	WC	5th	8	2	3	5	2
2018	Sweden	OG	5th	4	0	0	0	0
Junior totals				12	4	8	12	8
Senior totals				21	7	9	16	6

== Awards and honours ==
Award	Year
AHL
All-Star Game	2008
SHL
All-Star Team	2011
Guldhjälmen (MVP)	2014, 2017, 2018
Forward of the Year	2014, 2017
Stefan Liv Memorial Trophy	2014
Le Mat Trophy (Skellefteå AIK)	2013, 2014
Guldpucken	2014

Awards and achievements
Preceded by Bud Holloway	Winner of the Guldhjälmen; 2014	Succeeded by Derek Ryan
Preceded by Jimmie Ericsson	Winner of the Guldpucken; 2014	Succeeded by Victor Hedman
Preceded by Oscar Lindberg	Winner of the Stefan Liv Memorial Trophy; 2014	Succeeded by Noah Welch
