= Fredrik Lindgren =

Fredrik Lindgren may refer to:

- Fredrik Lindgren (musician) (1971–2025), Swedish musician
- Fredrik Lindgren (ice hockey) (born 1980), Swedish ice hockey player
- Fredrik Lindgren (speedway rider) (born 1985), Swedish motorcycle speedway rider
- Fredrik Lindgren (golfer) (born 1966), Swedish golfer
