= Alexander Johansson =

Alexander Johansson may refer to:

- Alexander Johansson (ice hockey) (born 1988), Swedish ice hockey forward
- Alexander Johansson (footballer, born 1995), Swedish football forward
- Alexander Johansson (footballer, born 2000), Swedish football striker
