= Kapstad =

Kapstad is a surname. Notable people with the surname include:

- Egil Kapstad (1940–2017), Norwegian jazz pianist, composer, and arranger
- Kenneth Kapstad (born 1979), Norwegian drummer
- Kevin Kapstad (born 1986), American ice hockey player
