= Stefan Liv Memorial Trophy =

- Awarded for: ice hockey award
- Date: 2010
- Country: Sweden
- Presented by: SICO
- First award: 2010
- Currently held by: Oscar Lindberg (Skellefteå AIK)

Highlights
- Most awards: Oscar Lindberg (2)

Stefan Liv Memorial Trophy is awarded annually to the Swedish Hockey League (SHL) playoffs' most valuable player (MVP), as decided by SICO (Sweden's Ice hockey players Central Organisation). It was installed in 2010 and resembles the Conn Smythe Trophy of the NHL. The trophy was renamed in honour of Stefan Liv in 2013. Stefan Liv, aged 30, was killed in the 2011 Lokomotiv Yaroslavl plane crash, along with his teammates and team staff of Russian club Lokomotiv Yaroslavl of the Kontinental Hockey League (KHL).

== Winners ==
Year	Winner	Team	Win #
2010	(Sweden) Johan Davidsson	HV71	1
2011	(Norway) Anders Bastiansen	Färjestad BK	1
2012	(Sweden) Jakob Silfverberg	Brynäs IF	1
2013	(Sweden) Oscar Lindberg	Skellefteå AIK	1
2014	(Sweden) Joakim Lindström	Skellefteå AIK	1
2015	(United States) Noah Welch	Växjö Lakers	1
2016	(Sweden) Johan Sundström	Frölunda HC	1
2017	(Sweden) Simon Önerud	HV71	1
2018	(Sweden) Elias Pettersson	Växjö Lakers	1
2019	(United States) Ryan Lasch	Frölunda HC	1
2020	(Sweden) Swedish healthcare (Note: No playoffs due to the COVID-19 pandemic in Sweden.)		
2021	(Sweden) Pontus Holmberg	Växjö Lakers	1
2022	(Sweden) Per Åslund	Färjestad BK	1
2023	(Finland) Emil Larmi	Växjö Lakers	1
2024	(Sweden) Linus Söderström	Skellefteå AIK	1
2025	(Canada) Frédéric Allard	Luleå HF	1
2026	(Sweden) Oscar Lindberg	Skellefteå AIK	2
