= Pierre-Édouard Bellemare =

French ice hockey player (born 1985)

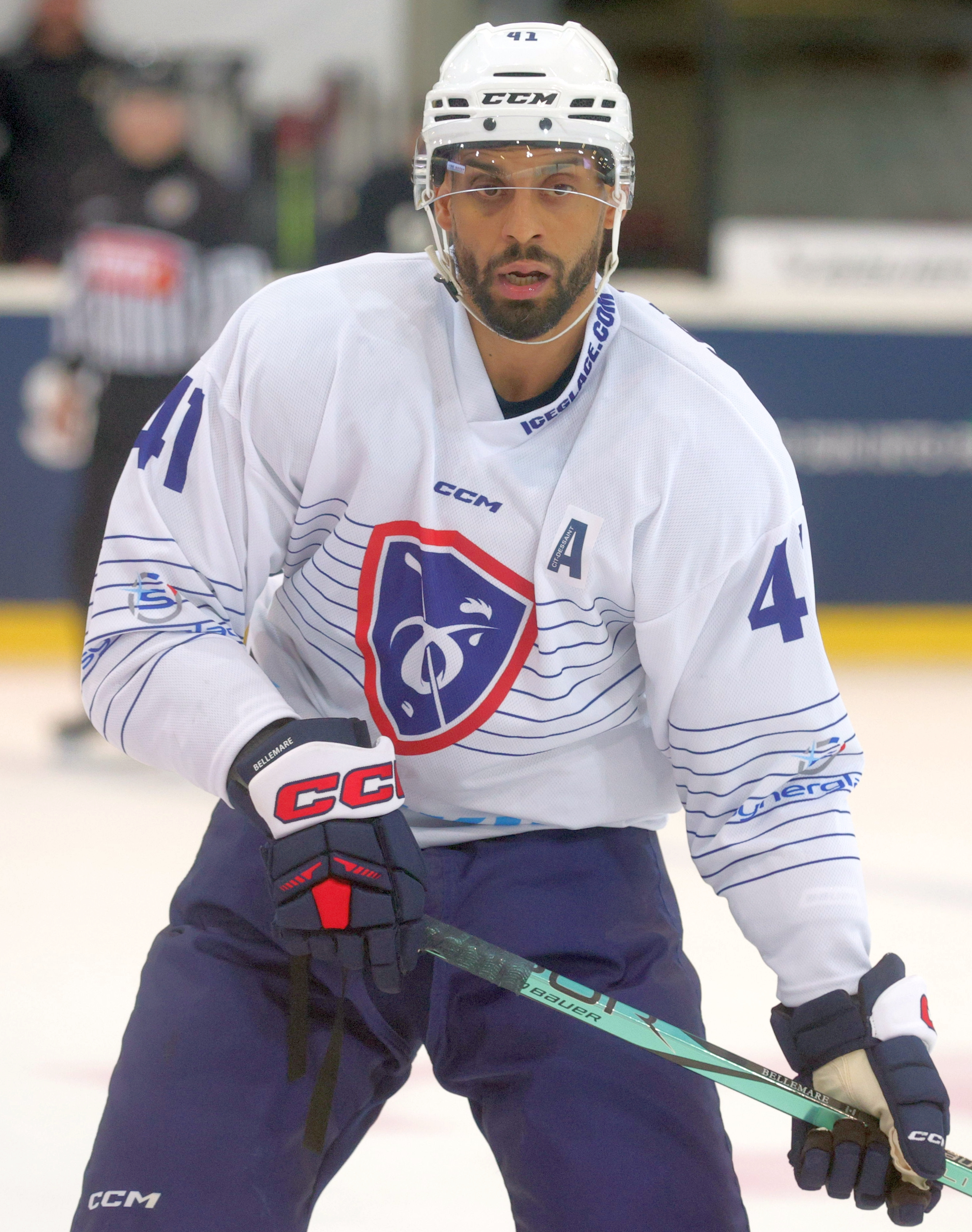
- Bellemare with France in 2024
- Born: 6 March 1985 (age 41) Le Blanc-Mesnil, France
- Height: 6 ft 0 in (183 cm)
- Weight: 196 lb (89 kg; 14 st 0 lb)
- Position: Forward
- Played for: Dragons de Rouen; Skellefteå AIK; Philadelphia Flyers; Vegas Golden Knights; Colorado Avalanche; Tampa Bay Lightning; Seattle Kraken; HC Ajoie
- National team: France
- NHL draft: Undrafted
- Playing career: 2002–2026

Pierre-Édouard Bellemare (born 6 March 1985) is a French former professional ice hockey player. A forward, Bellemare played in the National Hockey League (NHL) from 2014 to 2024 for the Philadelphia Flyers, Vegas Golden Knights, Colorado Avalanche, Tampa Bay Lightning and Seattle Kraken. Bellemare also played in the Ligue Magnus for the Dragons de Rouen, the Swedish Hockey League (SHL) with Skellefteå AIK, and the National League with HC Ajoie.

Internationally, Bellemare represented France on multiple occasions, including twelve Ice Hockey World Championships and the 2026 Winter Olympics.

== Playing career ==
=== Europe ===
Bellemare made France's top professional league, the Ligue Magnus in 2002 as a 17-year-old, playing with Dragons de Rouen. Showing early offensive promise, Bellemare was among Rouen's top scorers in each of his three full seasons with the club. Bellemare played in the Magnus until he was 20, before accepting an offer to play for Leksands IF, in Sweden's second tier league, HockeyAllsvenskan, in order to continue his development in stronger competition.

Bellemare established himself in the Allsvenskan, learning to play a responsible two-way game while improving his points totals in each of his three seasons with Leksands. In the 2008–09 season, Bellemare led the league with 31 goals however was unable to help Leksands gain promotion to the top tiered SHL (SEL).

On 21 April 2009, Bellemare left the Allsvenskan, agreeing to a contract with Skellefteå AIK of the SEL for the 2009–10 season. Establishing a role as a two-way centre with Skellefteå, Bellemare produced 9 goals and 14 points in 49 games in his rookie season. As Skellefteå AIK's third-line centre in the 2010–11 season, Bellemare agreed to a two-year contract extension on 22 December 2010.

From 2011 to 2014, Bellemare served as an alternate captain with Skellefteå, where he won the Swedish Championship back-to-back in 2013 and 2014.

=== Philadelphia Flyers ===
Having recorded 125 points in 238 career regular season games, Bellemare left the SHL after 5 seasons. Opting to pursue a career in the NHL, Bellemare signed his first North American contract as a 29-year old free agent with the Philadelphia Flyers, agreeing to a one-year, two-way contract on 11 June 2014.

After attending the Flyers' 2014 training camp, Bellemare made the opening night roster to begin the 2014–15 season. He made his NHL debut in a fourth-line centre role, against the Boston Bruins on 8 October 2014. He scored his first NHL goal on 22 October, in a victory against the Pittsburgh Penguins. Later in his rookie season (although not technically a rookie due to his age), Bellemare's experience and dependable defensive play was rewarded when he signed a two-year contract extension with the club on 2 March 2015. He appeared in 81 regular season games with the Flyers, missing just one game, posting 6 goals and 12 points.

Reprising his fourth-line centre role in his second season with the Flyers in 2015–16, Bellemare established a new career-best with 7 goals and 14 points in 74 games. He made his playoff debut with the Flyers in the opening game of the first-round against the Washington Capitals on 14 April 2016. Bellemare was suspended for one game on 19 April 2016, for an illegal check to Dmitry Orlov during game 3. He returned in Game 5, recording his first playoff point, an assist, as the Flyers shutout the Capitals 2-0 on 22 April 2016. He ended with 1 point through 5 games as the Flyers were defeated 4 games to 2 by the Capitals.

In the 2016–17 season, Bellemare appeared in every regular season game for the Flyers. He was named an alternate captain on 2 March 2017, a day after signing an additional two-year contract extension with the Flyers. He finished his third NHL season posting 4 goals and 8 points, unable to help the Flyers return to the playoffs.

=== Vegas Golden Knights ===
On 21 June 2017, having been unprotected by the Flyers at the 2017 NHL Expansion Draft, Bellemare was selected by the Vegas Golden Knights. He made his Golden Knights debut in the club's first regular season game, in a 2-1 victory over the Dallas Stars on 7 October 2017. In the 2017–18 season, he registered his first point with the Golden Knights during their home opener, registering an assist in a 5–2 victory over the Arizona Coyotes at T-Mobile Arena on 10 October 2017. Continuing his role as the club's primary fourth-line centre he was later placed on injured reserve on 19 February 2018 after being injured in a game against the Montreal Canadiens. He returned on 6 March for a game against the Columbus Blue Jackets. He led all Knights forwards with 63 blocked shots and finished with a career-high 10 assists and 16 points in 72 contests. He helped Vegas reach the 2018 Stanley Cup Final in their inaugural season, posting 3 assists in 20 playoff contests before losing to the Washington Capitals in 5 games.

In the following 2018–19 season, Bellemare was named as an alternate captain with the Golden Knights, and tallied 6 goals and 15 points in 76 games. He led the Golden Knights forwards in shorthanded time-on-ice and appeared 6 post-season games, missing the deciding Game 7 defeat to the San Jose Sharks due to injury. He was initially injured in Game 1 after he was the recipient of a cross-check to the face by Sharks forward Evander Kane. Kane was given a major penalty for cross-checking and a game misconduct, and was suspended one game.

=== Colorado Avalanche ===
Bellemare left the Golden Knights after their two first seasons, signing as a free agent a two-year, $3.6 million deal with the Colorado Avalanche on 1 July 2019. Acquired to assume the role as the Avalanche's fourth-line centre, Bellemare made his debut with the Avalanche in the opening game of the 2019–20 season against the Calgary Flames on 3 October 2019. Bellemare contributed early offensively, notching a career best 3 points against former club the Golden Knights in his first return to T-Mobile Arena in a 6-1 victory on 25 October, while also recorded a career high 7 points through the month of October. Even with the season ending early because of COVID-19, Bellemare set an NHL career high in goals with 9 and points with 22 during the 2019–20 season. He scored his first playoff goal in the Avs 6–4 win over the Dallas Stars in Game 3 of the Conference Semi-finals. Unable to help propel the Avalanche past the Stars in Game 7, Bellemare finished with 2 goals and 3 points through 15 post-season games.

Returning for the second year of his contract with the Avalanche in the pandemic delayed 2020–21 season, Bellemare resumed his role on the fourth-line and was relied upon for his faceoff prowess in winning 60% of his draws. He appeared in his 500th NHL game on 1 May 2021, against the San Jose Sharks, becoming just the second French trained player behind Antoine Roussel to achieve the feat. Matching his previous season high of 9 goals, Bellemare featured in 53 of the 56 regular season games for the Presidents' Trophy winning Avalanche. He registered 3 assists through 10 playoff contests with the Avalanche, unable to help the team advance past the second-round in a series defeat to the Vegas Golden Knights.

=== Tampa Bay Lightning ===
On 28 July 2021, Bellemare signed a two-year, $2 million contract with the Tampa Bay Lightning. Bellemare skated in 80 games for the Lightning during the 2021–22 season, recording nine goals and 11 assists for 20 points. The team reached the 2022 Stanley Cup Final, losing in six games to Bellemare's former team, the Avalanche.

=== Seattle Kraken ===
On 7 July 2023, Bellemare signed as a free agent to a one-year, $775,000 contract with the Seattle Kraken. In signing with the Kraken he was reunited with Dave Hakstol, his former head coach from his tenure with the Flyers. In the 2023–24 season, Bellemare was primarily deployed in the fourth-line role, and posted 4 goals and 7 points in a career season low of 40 regular season games.

=== Return to Colorado ===
As a free agent from the Kraken, Bellemare went un-signed over the summer. Approaching the 2024–25 season, Bellemare accepted an invitation to return to the Colorado Avalanche organization agreeing to attend training camp on a professional tryout on 11 September 2024. In participating in camp and pre-season in competition for the fourth-line centre role, Bellemare was released from his tryout with the Avalanche on 3 October 2024.

=== HC Ajoie ===
With his NHL prospects concluded, Bellemare returned to Europe in securing a one-year contract for the remainder of the season with Swiss club, HC Ajoie of the NL, on 31 October 2024.

On June 18, 2026, Bellemare announced his retirement from hockey. He finished his career with the most games played of any French-born player in NHL history.

== International play ==
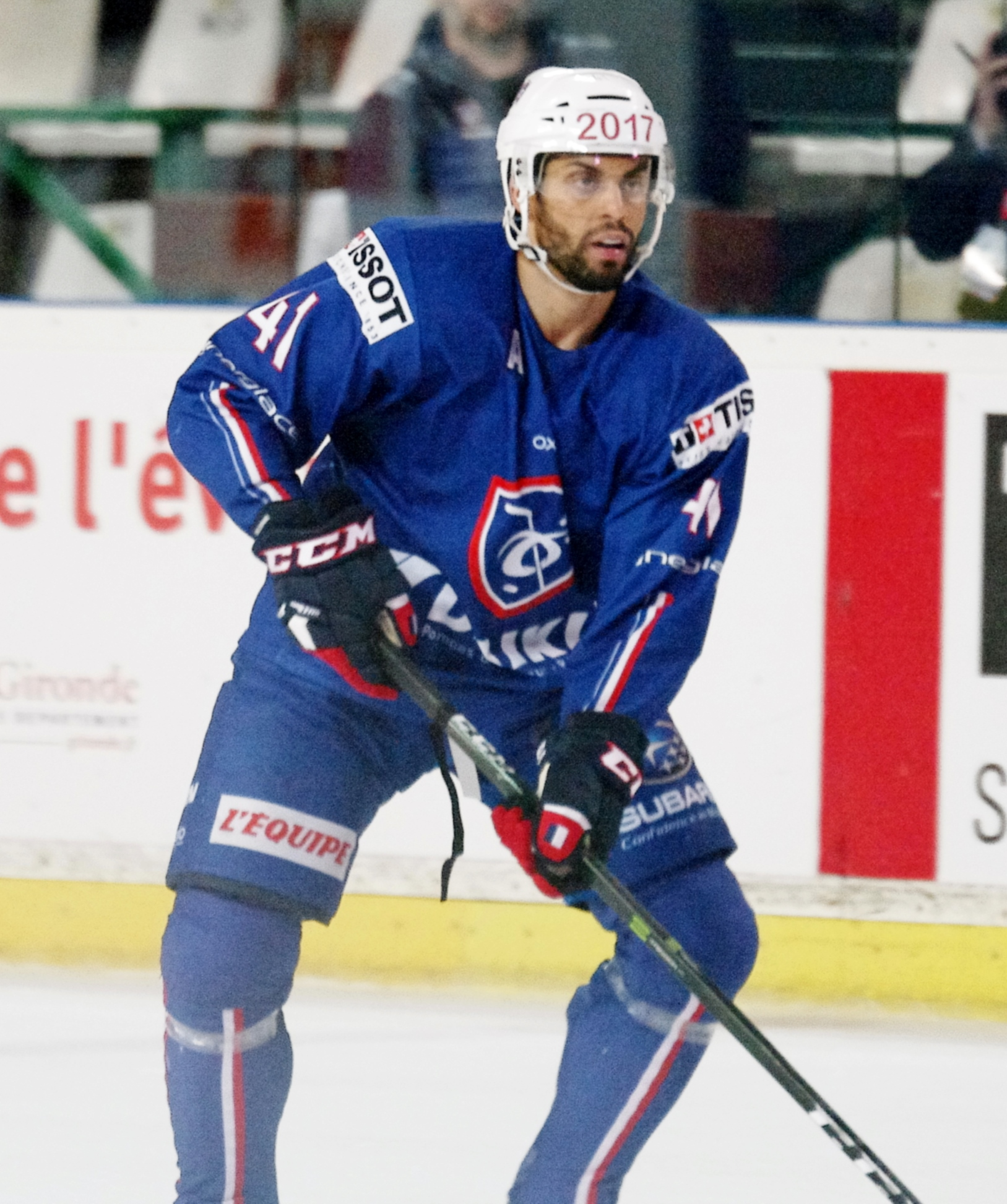
Bellemare in 2017

Bellemare participated at the 2010 IIHF World Championship as a member of the French national team. He was also named to the French roster for competition at the 2014 IIHF World Championship. In the nation's opening group game on 9 May 2014, Bellemare scored the game-winning shootout goal to give France a 3–2 victory over Canada, France's second-ever victory over the Canadians in 83 years.

In the 2016 World Cup of Hockey, Bellemare played for Team Europe, being the only player to represent France in the tournament. Team Europe finished runner-up, having lost to Canada 3–1 and 2–1 in the championship match.

In the 2017 IIHF World Championship, Bellemare was set to receive the Player of the Game award, scoring a goal and an assist in France's 5–1 win over Finland. In an act of selflessness and respect, he waived acceptance of the award, urging it deserved to go to the French Team goalie, Florian Hardy, who had 42 saves.

On 27 August 2024, Pierre was named captain of the French Olympic qualifying team attempting to participate in the 2026 Winter Olympics.

== Personal life ==
Bellemare was born in a suburb of Paris, the third of five children. His father was born in Martinique, an island in the Caribbean. He learned to skate and play hockey at age 6 when his 13-year-old sister, Aurore-Annick, wanted to play hockey and he and his brother tagged along. Another sister, Rose-Eliandre Bellemare, is an artistic gymnast who participated in the 2008 Summer Olympics in Beijing. Bellemare was in his first year of chiropractor school when he accepted an offer to play in Sweden at age 20. He is fluent in Swedish, French and English.

Bellemare and his wife have two children. They reside in Sweden in the off-season.

== Career statistics ==
=== Regular season and playoffs ===
			Regular season					Playoffs
Season	Team	League	GP	G	A	Pts	PIM	GP	G	A	Pts	PIM
2002–03	Dragons de Rouen	FRA	11	0	1	1	6	—	—	—	—	—
2003–04	Dragons de Rouen	FRA U22	14	12	18	30	40	2	4	4	8	2
2003–04	Dragons de Rouen	FRA	22	10	10	20	16	4	1	1	2	4
2004–05	Dragons de Rouen	FRA U22	4	4	9	13	6	—	—	—	—	—
2004–05	Dragons de Rouen	FRA	28	4	15	19	20	12	7	5	12	6
2005–06	Dragons de Rouen	FRA U22	3	2	3	5	0	—	—	—	—	—
2005–06	Dragons de Rouen	FRA	26	12	17	29	24	9	2	7	9	6
2006–07	Leksands IF	Allsv	44	8	11	19	24	10	1	0	1	4
2007–08	Leksands IF	J20	2	1	0	1	4	—	—	—	—	—
2007–08	Leksands IF	Allsv	40	14	15	29	12	10	2	3	5	4
2008–09	Leksands IF	Allsv	41	31	18	49	113	10	5	5	10	6
2009–10	Skellefteå AIK	SEL	49	9	5	14	16	12	2	7	9	8
2010–11	Skellefteå AIK	SEL	53	10	8	18	20	16	1	4	5	0
2011–12	Skellefteå AIK	SEL	55	19	17	36	40	15	4	8	12	12
2012–13	Skellefteå AIK	SEL	29	6	16	22	47	9	0	1	1	2
2013–14	Skellefteå AIK	SHL	52	20	15	35	32	14	9	5	14	6
2014–15	Philadelphia Flyers	NHL	81	6	6	12	18	—	—	—	—	—
2015–16	Philadelphia Flyers	NHL	74	7	7	14	27	5	0	1	1	15
2016–17	Philadelphia Flyers	NHL	82	4	4	8	20	—	—	—	—	—
2017–18	Vegas Golden Knights	NHL	72	6	10	16	14	20	0	3	3	14
2018–19	Vegas Golden Knights	NHL	76	6	9	15	6	6	0	0	0	2
2019–20	Colorado Avalanche	NHL	69	9	13	22	17	15	2	1	3	6
2020–21	Colorado Avalanche	NHL	53	9	2	11	21	10	0	3	3	0
2021–22	Tampa Bay Lightning	NHL	80	9	11	20	19	23	2	1	3	27
2022–23	Tampa Bay Lightning	NHL	73	4	9	13	34	6	1	1	2	0
2023–24	Seattle Kraken	NHL	40	4	3	7	6	—	—	—	—	—
2024–25	HC Ajoie	NL	34	10	18	28	6	11	3	8	11	2
2025–26	HC Ajoie	NL	37	1	10	11	18	1	0	1	1	2
FRA totals			87	26	43	69	66	25	10	13	23	16
SHL totals			238	64	61	125	155	66	16	25	41	28
NL totals			71	11	28	39	24	12	3	9	12	4
NHL totals			700	64	74	138	182	85	5	10	15	43

=== International ===
Year	Team	Event	Result	GP	G	A	Pts	PIM
2002	France	U18 D2	1st	5	6	4	10	4
2003	France	U18 D1	4th	4	3	1	4	29
2004	France	WJC D1	3rd	5	0	0	0	6
2004	France	WC	16th	3	0	0	0	2
2005	France	WJC D1	4th	5	5	1	6	18
2005	France	OGQ	3rd	6	1	2	3	6
2005	France	WC D1	2nd	5	1	0	1	0
2007	France	WC D1	1st	5	2	3	5	2
2008	France	WC	14th	5	0	0	0	18
2009	France	OGQ	4th	3	1	1	2	0
2009	France	WC	12th	6	2	1	3	2
2010	France	WC	14th	6	1	2	3	4
2011	France	WC	12th	6	1	1	2	2
2012	France	WC	9th	5	2	4	6	4
2013	France	OGQ	3rd	3	2	1	3	2
2013	France	WC	13th	7	1	3	4	0
2014	France	WC	8th	8	3	5	8	6
2016	France	WC	14th	7	1	3	4	0
2016	France	OGQ	2nd	3	0	1	1	2
2016	Team Europe	WCH	2nd	6	1	1	2	4
2017	France	WC	9th	7	2	2	4	4
2021	France	OGQ	2nd	3	0	0	0	0
2024	France	WC	14th	7	2	0	2	0
2024	France	OGQ	2nd	3	1	0	1	0
2025	France	WC	16th	7	1	3	4	4
2026	France	OG	11th	4	1	0	1	2
Junior totals				19	14	6	20	57
Senior totals				115	26	33	59	64

== Awards and honours ==
Award	Year
Ligue Magnus
Champion	2004, 2005, 2006
Jean-Pierre Graff Trophy	2005
Allsv
Top goal scorer (31)	2009
SHL
Le Mat Trophy champion	2013, 2014
