= Erik Andersson (ice hockey, born 1982) =

Swedish ice hockey player

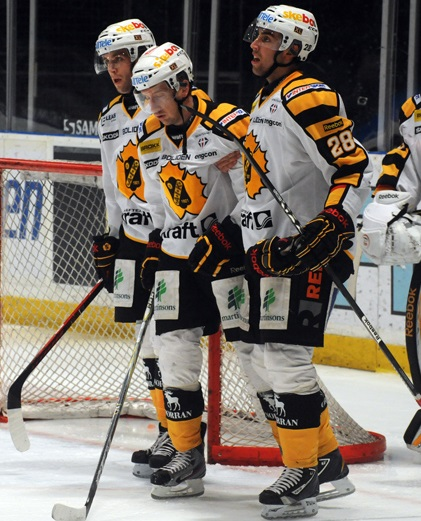
- Erik Andersson (in the middle) of Skellefteå AIK during a SHL game against AIK.
- Born: April 15, 1982 (age 43) Umeå, Sweden
- Height: 5 ft 11 in (180 cm)
- Weight: 179 lb (81 kg; 12 st 11 lb)
- Position: Defence
- Shot: Left
- Played for: Linköpings HC; Skellefteå AIK; Malmö Redhawks
- NHL draft: Undrafted
- Playing career: 2000–2018

Erik Andersson (born April 15, 1982) is a Swedish former professional ice hockey defenceman who last played for Malmö Redhawks of the SHL. In October 2018 Andersson officially ended his career.

== Career statistics ==
			Regular season					Playoffs
Season	Team	League	GP	G	A	Pts	PIM	GP	G	A	Pts	PIM
1999–00	IF Björklöven J18	J18 Allsvenskan	9	3	5	8	4	—	—	—	—	—
1999–00	IF Björklöven	Allsvenskan	1	0	0	0	0	—	—	—	—	—
2000–01	IF Björklöven J20	J20 SuperElit	18	0	6	6	10	—	—	—	—	—
2001–02	IF Björklöven J20	J20 SuperElit	12	5	8	13	33	—	—	—	—	—
2001–02	IF Björklöven	Allsvenskan	30	1	3	4	6	10	1	5	6	2
2002–03	IF Björklöven	Allsvenskan	33	11	21	32	12	—	—	—	—	—
2003–04	IF Björklöven	Allsvenskan	38	12	12	24	20	—	—	—	—	—
2004–05	IF Björklöven	Allsvenskan	12	3	3	6	10	—	—	—	—	—
2005–06	IF Björklöven	HockeyAllsvenskan	25	2	4	6	26	—	—	—	—	—
2005–06	IF Björklöven J20	J20 SuperElit	2	2	0	2	0	—	—	—	—	—
2006–07	IF Björklöven	HockeyAllsvenskan	38	4	16	20	32	9	0	1	1	0
2007–08	Skellefteå AIK	Elitserien	50	5	9	14	32	4	0	0	0	8
2008–09	Skellefteå AIK	Elitserien	52	8	13	21	22	11	1	4	5	4
2009–10	Linköping HC	Elitserien	51	4	8	12	36	12	1	0	1	4
2010–11	Linköping HC	Elitserien	52	6	11	17	26	7	1	3	4	2
2011–12	Linköping HC	Elitserien	39	0	2	2	14	—	—	—	—	—
2012–13	Skellefteå AIK	Elitserien	49	3	3	6	12	12	0	5	5	6
2013–14	Skellefteå AIK	SHL	53	4	8	12	18	10	1	2	3	4
2014–15	Skellefteå AIK	SHL	50	3	8	11	16	13	0	1	1	2
2015–16	Malmö Redhawks	SHL	36	3	7	10	4	—	—	—	—	—
2016–17	Malmö Redhawks	SHL	40	0	6	6	6	11	0	2	2	0
2017–18	Malmö Redhawks	SHL	11	1	0	1	2	—	—	—	—	—
SHL totals			483	37	75	112	188	80	4	17	21	30
