= Martin Grönberg =

Swedish ice hockey player

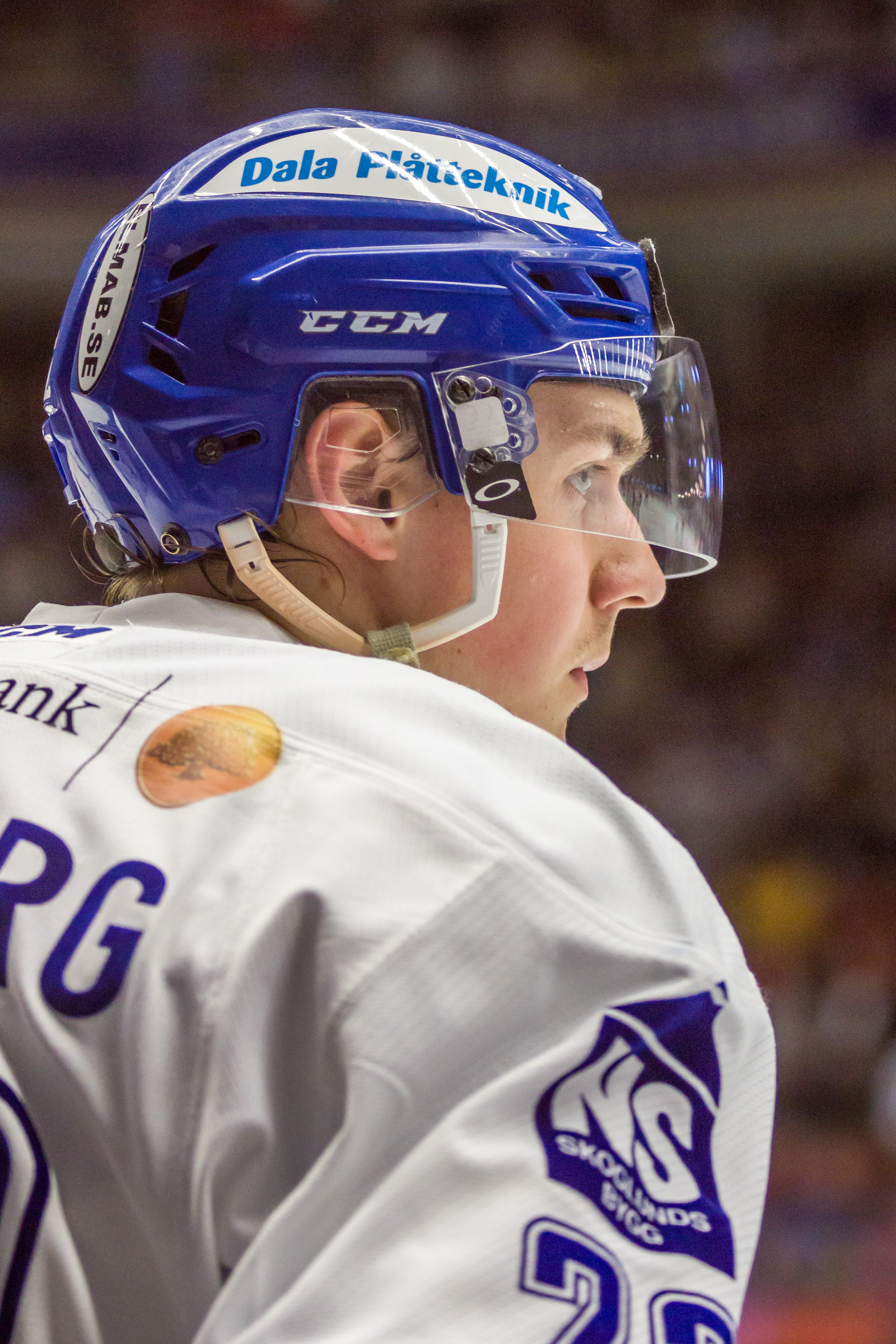
- Born: May 11, 1994 (age 31) Mockfjärd, Sweden
- Height: 5 ft 11 in (180 cm)
- Weight: 187 lb (85 kg; 13 st 5 lb)
- Position: Centre
- Shoots: Left
- GET team Former teams: Sparta Warriors; Leksands IF
- Playing career: 2013–present

Martin Grönberg (born May 11, 1994) is a Swedish professional ice hockey player. He is currently playing with the Salavat Yulaev of the Russia KHL

Gronberg made his Swedish Hockey League debut playing with Leksands IF during the 2013–14 SHL season.
