= Oscar Lindberg (ice hockey) =

Swedish ice hockey player (born 1991)

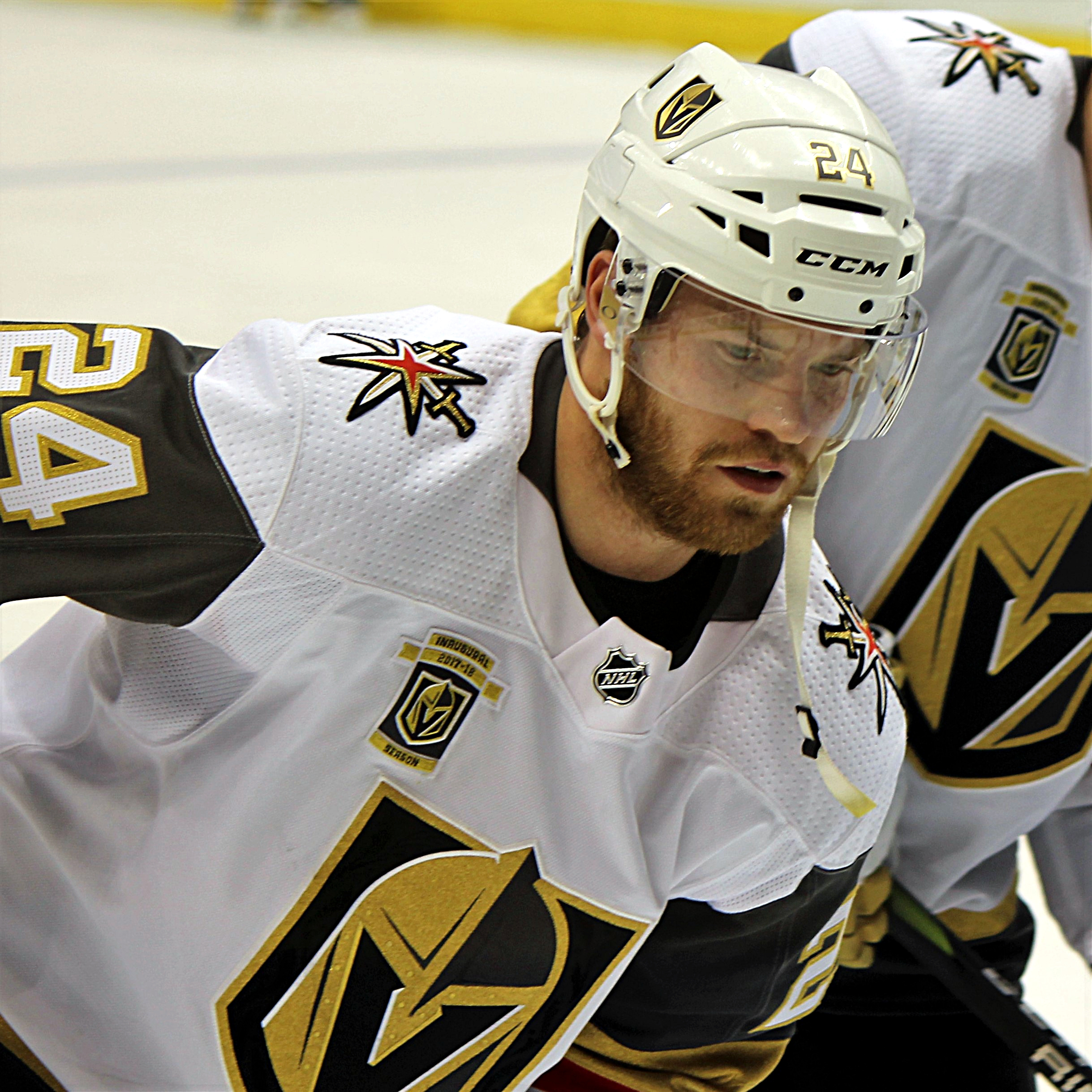
- Lindberg with the Vegas Golden Knights in 2018
- Born: 29 October 1991 (age 34) Skellefteå, Sweden
- Height: 185 cm (6 ft 1 in)
- Weight: 92 kg (203 lb; 14 st 7 lb)
- Position: Centre
- Shoots: Left
- SHL team Former teams: Skellefteå AIK; New York Rangers; Vegas Golden Knights; Ottawa Senators; EV Zug; Dynamo Moscow; SC Bern
- National team: Sweden
- NHL draft: 57th overall, 2010; Phoenix Coyotes
- Playing career: 2009–present

Oscar Lindberg (born 29 October 1991) is a Swedish professional ice hockey forward who is currently playing with Skellefteå AIK of the Swedish Hockey League. He previously played for the New York Rangers, the Vegas Golden Knights and the Ottawa Senators in the National Hockey League (NHL). He represented Sweden in the 2011 World Junior Ice Hockey Championships. He also represented Sweden on their gold medal-winning 2013 IIHF World Championship team.

== Playing career ==
=== Phoenix Coyotes ===
Central Scouting Bureau ranked Lindberg seventh among European Skaters for the 2010 NHL entry draft, however he was not drafted until the second round, 57th overall, by the Phoenix Coyotes.

=== New York Rangers ===
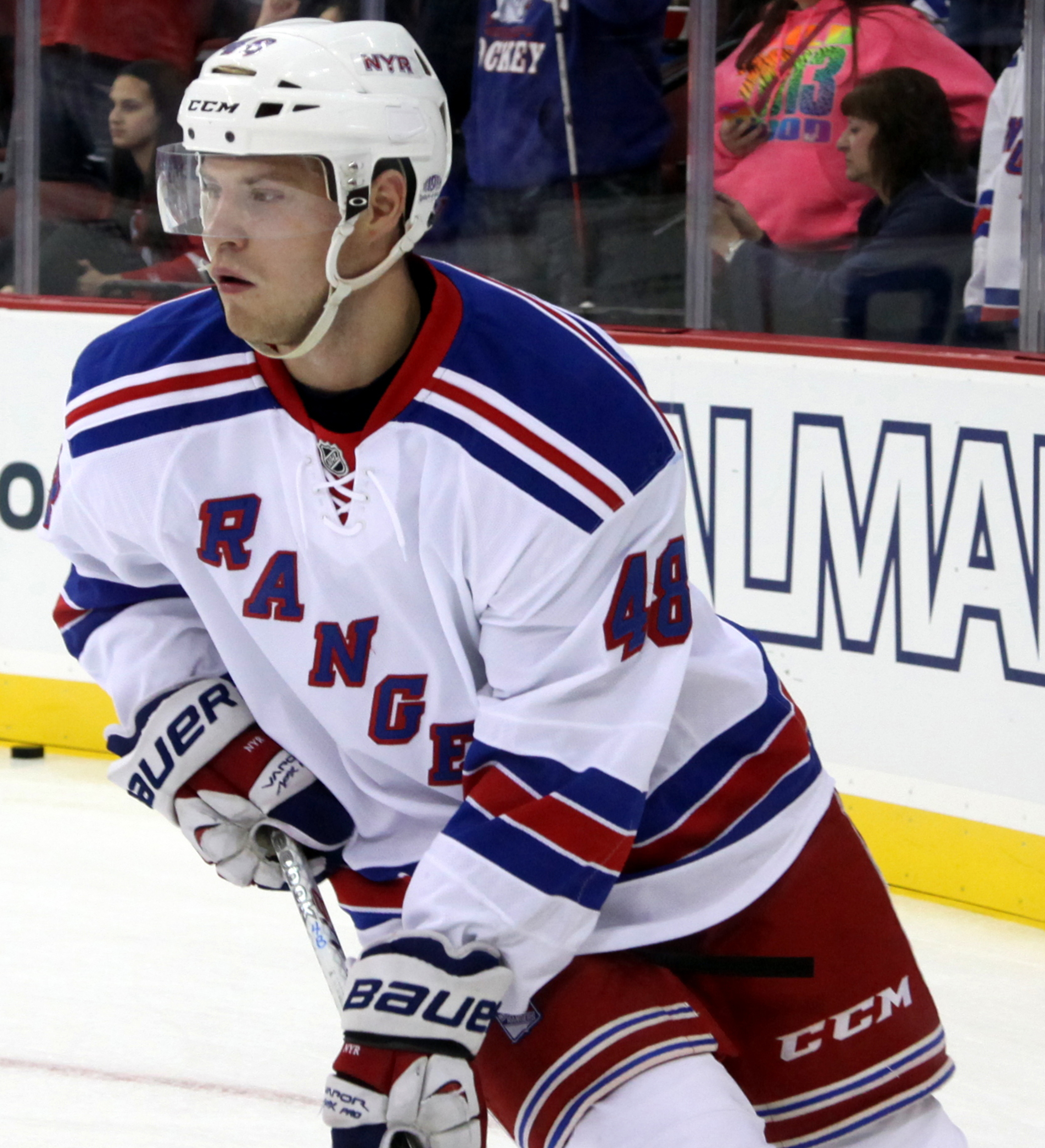
Lindberg during a 2014 preseason game

On 8 May 2011, Lindberg was traded from the Phoenix Coyotes to the New York Rangers in return for Ethan Werek.

In 2012–13, Lindberg was awarded the Stefan Liv Memorial Trophy as the Most Valuable Player of the SHL playoffs.

On 24 February 2015, Lindberg played in one New York Rangers game, with forward Rick Nash out with a fever. The New York Rangers won the game 1–0.

Lindberg was named the Rangers' best rookie in their 2015 training camp. He made the Rangers out of training camp for the 2015–16 season and scored his first NHL goal in the first period on opening night against Corey Crawford of the Chicago Blackhawks.

=== Vegas Golden Knights ===
On 21 June 2017, Lindberg went unprotected by the Rangers in the 2017 NHL Expansion Draft and was subsequently selected by the Vegas Golden Knights. As a restricted free agent he later agreed on a two-year contract worth $3.4 million with the Golden Knights on 4 July 2017.

On 10 October 2017, Lindberg scored his first goal with the Golden Knights in the Knights first franchise home game.

=== Ottawa Senators ===
On 25 February 2019, Lindberg, Erik Brännström and a second-round draft pick in the 2020 NHL entry draft, were traded to the Ottawa Senators in return for Mark Stone and Tobias Lindberg (no relation).

=== EV Zug ===
On 26 August 2019, as an NHL free agent, Lindberg joined EV Zug of the National League (NL) on a one-year deal with an option for a second season. In the 2019–20 season, Lindberg was placed in an increased role with Zug, registering 14 goals and 30 points through 46 games, before the season was cancelled due to COVID-19.

=== Dynamo Moscow ===
Having left his optional contract with Zug, Lindberg moved to the KHL as a free agent, securing a one-year deal with HC Dynamo Moscow on 8 May 2020. In the 2021–22 season, Lindberg was limited to just 24 regular season games, however increased his offensive output with a point-per-season pace of 25 points.

=== SC Bern ===
As a free agent at the conclusion of his deal with Dynamo, Lindberg opted to return to the Swiss National League, agreeing to a two-year deal with SC Bern on 10 June 2022.

== Career statistics ==
=== Regular season and playoffs ===
			Regular season					Playoffs
Season	Team	League	GP	G	A	Pts	PIM	GP	G	A	Pts	PIM
2007–08	Skellefteå AIK	J18	17	11	21	32	20	—	—	—	—	—
2007–08	Skellefteå AIK	J18 Allsv	14	8	8	16	16	—	—	—	—	—
2007–08	Skellefteå AIK	J20	1	0	0	0	2	2	0	1	1	0
2008–09	Skellefteå AIK	J18	4	5	7	12	6	—	—	—	—	—
2008–09	Skellefteå AIK	J18 Allsv	2	3	3	6	8	7	4	5	9	8
2008–09	Skellefteå AIK	J20	38	14	19	33	54	5	0	1	1	4
2009–10	Skellefteå AIK	J20	30	14	13	37	44	1	1	1	2	12
2009–10	Skellefteå AIK	SHL	36	1	1	2	35	10	2	0	2	2
2010–11	Skellefteå AIK	J20	9	8	4	12	8	—	—	—	—	—
2010–11	Skellefteå AIK	SEL	41	5	9	14	31	18	3	4	7	4
2011–12	Skellefteå AIK	J20	2	1	3	4	2	—	—	—	—	—
2011–12	Skellefteå AIK	SEL	46	5	5	10	18	18	1	3	4	10
2011–12	IF Sundsvall Hockey	Allsv	5	1	1	2	2	—	—	—	—	—
2012–13	Skellefteå AIK	SHL	55	17	25	42	54	13	4	8	12	16
2013–14	Hartford Wolf Pack	AHL	75	18	26	44	58	—	—	—	—	—
2014–15	Hartford Wolf Pack	AHL	75	28	28	56	68	15	3	13	16	6
2014–15	New York Rangers	NHL	1	0	0	0	0	—	—	—	—	—
2015–16	New York Rangers	NHL	68	13	15	28	43	2	0	0	0	2
2016–17	New York Rangers	NHL	65	8	12	20	32	12	3	1	4	2
2017–18	Vegas Golden Knights	NHL	63	9	2	11	14	3	0	1	1	2
2018–19	Vegas Golden Knights	NHL	35	4	8	12	24	—	—	—	—	—
2018–19	Ottawa Senators	NHL	20	5	3	8	4	—	—	—	—	—
2019–20	EV Zug	NL	46	14	16	30	91	—	—	—	—	—
2020–21	Dynamo Moscow	KHL	44	11	25	36	80	10	3	1	4	6
2021–22	Dynamo Moscow	KHL	24	9	16	25	12	11	2	7	9	15
2022–23	SC Bern	NL	51	16	26	42	44	9	1	6	7	8
2023–24	Skellefteå AIK	SHL	50	18	33	51	56	16	1	9	10	10
2024–25	Skellefteå AIK	SHL	52	19	28	47	44	11	2	6	8	10
SHL totals			280	65	101	166	238	86	13	30	43	52
NHL totals			252	39	40	79	117	17	3	2	5	6
NL totals			97	30	42	72	135	9	1	6	7	8
KHL totals			68	20	41	61	92	21	5	8	13	21

=== International ===
Medal record

Ice hockey

Representing Sweden

World Championships
Gold medal – first place	2013 Sweden/Finland	
Gold medal – first place	2017 Germany/France	

Year	Team	Event	Result	GP	G	A	Pts	PIM
2009	Sweden	U18	5th	6	0	2	2	8
2011	Sweden	WJC	4th	6	2	2	4	6
2013	Sweden	WC	1st place, gold medalist(s)	10	1	1	2	2
2017	Sweden	WC	1st place, gold medalist(s)	5	0	2	2	0
2021	Sweden	WC	9th	7	0	1	1	8
2023	Sweden	WC	6th	8	3	5	8	0
Junior totals				12	2	4	6	14
Senior totals				30	4	9	13	10

== Awards and honours ==
Award	Year
SHL
Le Mat Trophy	2013, 2024, 2026

Awards and achievements
Preceded by Jakob Silfverberg	Winner of the Stefan Liv Memorial Trophy (Playoff MVP); 2013	Succeeded by Joakim Lindström
