= Kevin Kapstad =

American ice hockey player (born 1986)

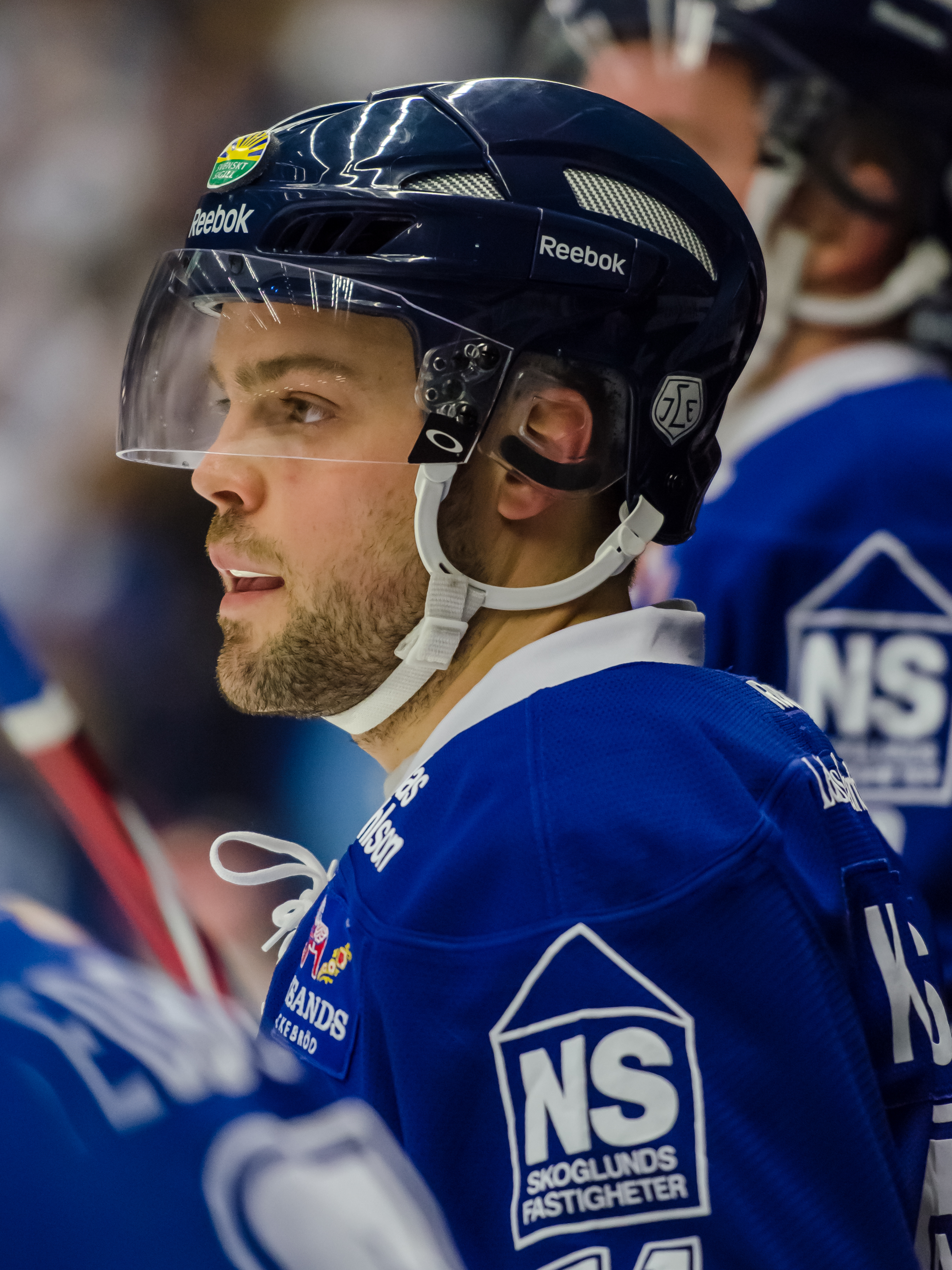
- Born: February 12, 1986 (age 40) Boxborough, Massachusetts, U.S.
- Height: 5 ft 10 in (178 cm)
- Weight: 181 lb (82 kg; 12 st 13 lb)
- Position: Defense
- Shot: Left
- Played for: SC Riessersee; EV Landshut; Leksands IF; EC KAC; EHC Black Wings Linz
- NHL draft: Undrafted
- Playing career: 2009–2019

Kevin Kapstad (born February 12, 1986) is an American former professional ice hockey defenseman. He is Tore and Bjorn's brother.

== Playing career ==
Undrafted, Kapstad played collegiate hockey with the University of New Hampshire in the Hockey East. At the completion of his senior year, Kapstad embarked upon a European career signing in the 2nd Bundesliga with SC Riessersee and later EV Landshut.

On April 27, 2012, Kapstad left Norway and signed with Leksands IF of the then HockeyAllsvenskan. In the 2012–13 season, Kapstad contributed with 38 points in 52 games to help Leksands gain promotion to the Swedish Hockey League. Kapstad made his SHL debut playing with Leksands during the 2013–14 SHL season.

After three seasons with Leksands, Kapstad left Sweden as a free agent and signed a two-year contract with the Austrian club, EC KAC of the EBEL on June 18, 2015.

== Career statistics ==
			Regular season					Playoffs
Season	Team	League	GP	G	A	Pts	PIM	GP	G	A	Pts	PIM
2005–06	University of New Hampshire	NCAA	3	0	1	1	2	—	—	—	—	—
2006–07	University of New Hampshire	NCAA	38	4	2	6	22	—	—	—	—	—
2007–08	University of New Hampshire	NCAA	38	3	8	11	22	—	—	—	—	—
2008–09	University of New Hampshire	NCAA	38	2	23	25	40	—	—	—	—	—
2009–10	SC Riessersee	Germany2	36	3	18	21	79	2	2	1	3	2
2010–11	Landshut Cannibals	Germany2	48	1	18	19	34	6	0	4	4	2
2011–12	Landshut Cannibals	Germany2	47	9	28	37	89	14	4	8	12	18
2012–13	Leksands IF	HockeyAllsvenskan	52	6	32	38	48	9	1	1	2	4
2013–14	Leksands IF	SHL	52	7	18	25	46	3	1	1	2	4
2014–15	Leksands IF	SHL	47	3	10	13	26	—	—	—	—	—
2015–16	EC KAC	EBEL	49	8	22	30	58	6	2	2	4	2
2016–17	EC KAC	EBEL	33	9	11	20	38	13	1	3	4	6
2017–18	EC KAC	EBEL	43	5	16	21	61	6	0	3	3	2
2018–19	Black Wings Linz	EBEL	50	5	22	27	28	6	2	1	3	4
SHL totals			99	10	28	38	72	3	1	1	2	4
EBEL totals			175	27	71	98	185	31	5	9	14	14
Germany2 totals			131	13	64	77	202	22	6	13	19	22
