= Bud Holloway =

Canadian ice hockey player

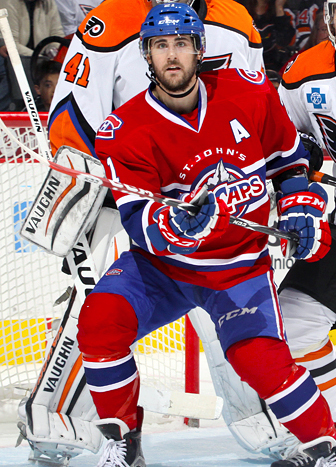
- Holloway with the St. John's IceCaps in 2015
- Born: March 1, 1988 (age 38) Wapella, Saskatchewan, Canada
- Height: 6 ft 1 in (185 cm)
- Weight: 200 lb (91 kg; 14 st 4 lb)
- Position: Right wing
- Shot: Right
- BSHL team Former teams: Moosomin Rangers; Skellefteå AIK; SC Bern; Montreal Canadiens; CSKA Moscow; EC Red Bull Salzburg
- NHL draft: 86th overall, 2006; Los Angeles Kings
- Playing career: 2008–2020

George Edward Holloway III known as Bud Holloway (born March 1, 1988) is a Canadian former professional ice hockey right wing. He was selected by the Los Angeles Kings in the 3rd round (86th overall) of the 2006 NHL entry draft.

== Playing career ==
Holloway played for the Seattle Thunderbirds of the Western Hockey League from 2004 to 2008. He then split the 2008–09 campaign between AHL's Manchester Monarchs and ECHL's Ontario Reign. After two more years with the Monarchs, he took his game to Sweden. On July 25, 2011, Holloway was signed as a free agent by Skellefteå AIK of the Swedish Hockey League (SHL). He was acquired by Skellefteå around the same time as fellow Manchester Monarchs' player Oscar Möller. Holloway won the Swedish National Championship with Skellefteå AIK in 2013 and 2014, and received the Golden Helmet Award as the league's Player of the Year following the 2012–13 season.

In the SHL playoffs, Holloway holds the record for the most points in a single playoff year (23 points: 10 G, 13 A), which he set in the 2011–12 season, surpassing Espen Knutsen's 21 points in the 1999–2000 season. The following season, Holloway became only the second player in SHL history (after Håkan Loob in 1982–83) to score over 70 points in a single SHL regular season; he scored 20 goals and 51 assists for a total of 71 points.

On May 17, 2014, Holloway left the SHL after three seasons and signed as a free agent to a two-year contract with Swiss club SC Bern of the NLA. He won the Swiss cup competition with SCB. He saw the ice in 53 NLA contests, tallying 17 goals and 28 assists. Holloway parted company with SC Bern following the 2014–15 season.

On July 1, 2015, Holloway signed a one-year, two-way contract with the Montreal Canadiens for the 2015–16 season. On November 27, 2015, Holloway made his NHL debut, and his only NHL appearance to date, in a game against the New Jersey Devils. He spent most of the season with Montreal's AHL affiliate, the St. John's IceCaps. One of his most notable plays that year came during a game against the Binghamton Senators when he made a diving mid-air stick save to prevent an empty-net goal. Holloway played a further three seasons with Skellefteå AIK before leaving following the conclusion of the 2018–19 season. On June 6, 2019, Holloway signed as a free agent to a one-year contract with Austrian outfit EC Red Bull Salzburg of the EBEL.

== Career statistics ==
=== Regular season and playoffs ===
			Regular season					Playoffs
Season	Team	League	GP	G	A	Pts	PIM	GP	G	A	Pts	PIM
2003–04	Yorkton Harvest AAA	SMHL	43	15	21	36	22	—	—	—	—	—
2003–04	Seattle Thunderbirds	WHL	2	0	0	0	0	—	—	—	—	—
2004–05	Seattle Thunderbirds	WHL	67	4	11	15	27	12	0	1	1	0
2005–06	Seattle Thunderbirds	WHL	72	21	13	34	18	7	3	2	5	4
2006–07	Seattle Thunderbirds	WHL	71	27	38	65	50	11	3	3	6	8
2007–08	Seattle Thunderbirds	WHL	70	43	40	83	55	12	5	5	10	4
2008–09	Manchester Monarchs	AHL	38	7	5	12	6	—	—	—	—	—
2008–09	Ontario Reign	ECHL	23	14	8	22	8	7	5	9	14	8
2009–10	Manchester Monarchs	AHL	75	19	28	47	26	16	7	7	14	9
2010–11	Manchester Monarchs	AHL	78	28	33	61	58	7	4	7	11	10
2011–12	Skellefteå AIK	SEL	55	21	28	49	32	19	10	13	23	4
2012–13	Skellefteå AIK	SEL	55	20	51	71	36	13	4	5	9	18
2013–14	Skellefteå AIK	SHL	53	10	23	33	26	11	3	5	8	6
2014–15	SC Bern	NLA	42	13	24	37	24	11	4	4	8	4
2015–16	Montreal Canadiens	NHL	1	0	0	0	0	—	—	—	—	—
2015–16	St. John's IceCaps	AHL	70	19	42	61	14	—	—	—	—	—
2016–17	CSKA Moscow	KHL	12	3	6	9	6	—	—	—	—	—
2016–17	Skellefteå AIK	SHL	26	11	11	22	0	7	1	2	3	4
2017–18	Skellefteå AIK	SHL	39	8	14	22	8	14	2	2	4	8
2018–19	Skellefteå AIK	SHL	52	11	15	26	10	6	2	0	2	0
2019–20	EC Red Bull Salzburg	AUT	46	12	16	28	22	3	3	1	4	0
AHL totals			261	73	108	181	104	23	11	14	25	19
SHL totals			280	81	142	223	112	70	22	27	49	40
NHL totals			1	0	0	0	0	—	—	—	—	—

=== International ===
Year	Team	Event	Result	GP	G	A	Pts	PIM
2005	Canada Western	U17	1st place, gold medalist(s)	6	0	0	0	2
Junior totals				6	0	0	0	2
