= Guldhjälmen =

Swedish ice hockey award

- Sport: Ice hockey
- League: SHL & SDHL
- Awarded for: Most outstanding player in the regular season as judged by each league's players
- English name: The Gold Helmet
- Sponsored by: Magasinet Hockey; CCM Hockey; TV4

History
- First award: 1986 (men); 2020 (women)
- First winner: Kari Eloranta (men); Lara Stalder (women)
- Most wins: Joakim Lindström (3)
- Most recent: SHL: Antti Suomela (2023); SDHL: Elisa Holopainen (2025)

Guldhjälmen (lit. 'The Gold Helmet') comprises two Swedish annual ice hockey awards that recognize the most valuable player of the Swedish Hockey League (SHL) and of the Swedish Women's Hockey League (SDHL) as judged by each league's players, respectively. Guldhjälmen is sponsored by the Swedish Magasinet Hockey in cooperation with CCM Hockey and TV4.

Guldhjälmen was introduced in 1986 as Elitserien (renamed SHL in 2013) award. It is analogous to the NHL's Ted Lindsay Award, an MVP award voted on by members of the NHL Players' Association, and is the companion of the Viking Award, which recognizes the best Swedish player active in North America as determined by player vote. It should not be confused with Guldpucken (lit. 'The Golden Puck'), which is awarded to the men's Swedish Player of the Year by Expressen and the Swedish Ice Hockey Association.

The first winner was Finnish defenseman Kari Eloranta of HV71 for the 1985–86 Elitserien season. Winger Joakim Lindström has received Guldhjälmen three times, once more than any other player in history.

The award was expanded to encompass the player-selected MVP of the SDHL in 2020. Following the 2019–20 SDHL season, Swiss forward Lara Stalder of Brynäs IF was selected to become the first woman to win Guldhjälmen by vote of SDHL players. Guldhjälmen should not be confused with the Kronprinsessan Margaretas pris (lit. 'Crown Princess Margareta's Award'), also known as the SDHL MVP, which is awarded to the most valuable player of the SDHL as chosen by the Swedish Ice Hockey Association.

== Winners ==
=== Women ===
- 2020 – Lara Stalder, Brynäs IF
- 2021 – Kateřina Mrázová, Brynäs IF
- 2022 – Sidney Brodt, Linköping HC
- 2023 – Anna Meixner, Brynäs IF
- 2024 – Lina Ljungblom, MoDo Hockey
- 2025 – Elisa Holopainen, Frölunda HC

=== Men ===
Players in bold type also won Guldpucken in the same season.

- 1986 - Kari Eloranta, HV71
- 1987 - Peter Lindmark, Färjestad BK
- 1988 - Anders Eldebrink, Södertälje SK
- 1989 - Anders Eldebrink, Södertälje SK **(2)**
- 1990 - Bengt-Åke Gustafsson, Färjestad BK
- 1991 - Håkan Loob, Färjestad BK
- 1992 - Håkan Loob, Färjestad BK **(2)**
- 1993 - **Peter Forsberg**, Modo Hockey
- 1994 - **Peter Forsberg**, Modo Hockey **(2)**
- 1995 - Pelle Eklund, Leksands IF
- 1996 - Esa Keskinen, HV71
- 1997 - Jarmo Myllys, Luleå HF
- 1998 - Tommy Söderström, Djurgårdens IF
- 1999 - Jan Larsson, Brynäs IF
- 2000 - Rikard Franzén, AIK
- 2001 - Kristian Huselius, Västra Frölunda HC
- 2002 - Ulf Söderström, Färjestad BK
- 2003 - **Niklas Andersson**, Västra Frölunda HC
- 2004 - Magnus Kahnberg, Västra Frölunda HC
- 2005 - **Henrik Lundqvist**, Frölunda HC
- 2006 - Andreas Karlsson, HV71
- 2007 - Fredrik Bremberg, Djurgårdens IF
- 2008 - Tony Mårtensson, Linköpings HC
- 2009 - Johan Davidsson, HV71
- 2010 - Mats Zuccarello, Modo Hockey
- 2011 - Magnus Johansson, Linköpings HC
- 2012 - **Jakob Silfverberg**, Brynäs IF
- 2013 - Bud Holloway, Skellefteå AIK
- 2014 - **Joakim Lindström**, Skellefteå AIK
- 2015 - Derek Ryan, Örebro HK
- 2016 - Anton Rödin, Brynäs IF
- 2017 - Joakim Lindström, Skellefteå AIK **(2)**
- 2018 - Joakim Lindström, Skellefteå AIK **(3)**
- 2019 - Jacob Josefson, Djurgårdens IF
- 2020 - Kodie Curran, Rögle BK
- 2021 - Marek Hrivík, Leksands IF
- 2022 - Max Véronneau, Leksands IF
- 2023 - Antti Suomela, IK Oskarshamn
- 2024 - Joel Persson, Växjö Lakers
- 2025 - David Tomášek, Färjestad BK
