= Alexander Johansson (ice hockey) =

Swedish ice hockey player (born 1988)

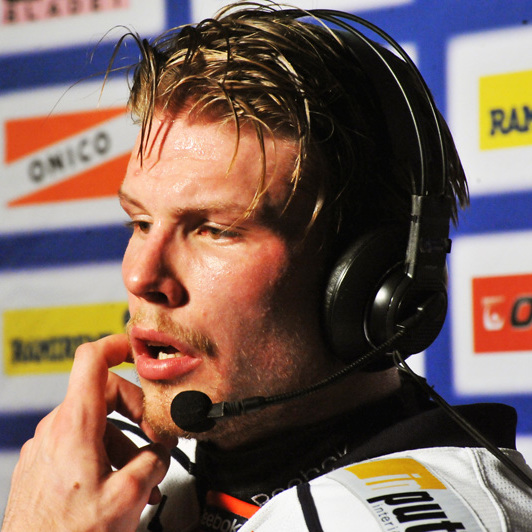
- Born: November 30, 1988 (age 37) Värnamo, Sweden
- Height: 6 ft 1 in (185 cm)
- Weight: 198 lb (90 kg; 14 st 2 lb)
- Position: Forward
- Shot: Left
- Played for: Växjö Lakers; Färjestad BK; Grizzlys Wolfsburg; Linköping HC
- Playing career: 2008–2022

Alexander Johansson (born November 30, 1988) is a Swedish former professional ice hockey forward. He most notably played in the Swedish Hockey League (SHL).

== Playing career ==
Undrafted, Johansson made his Swedish Hockey League debut playing with Växjö Lakers during the 2012–13 SHL season.

After four seasons with including claiming the Le Mat Trophy in the 2014–15 season, Johansson opted to sign a two-year contract with fellow SHL club, Färjestad BK, on April 21, 2016. In his debut season with Färjestad in 2016–17, Johansson enjoyed a career best year offensively, collecting 15 goals and 32 points in 47 games. At the conclusion of the year, Johansson was selected with the honour of being named team captain for the following 2017–18 season.

Johansson suffered an injury-plagued 2018–19 season, restricting him to just 14 games. With limited prospects of regaining his roster spot, the remaining two years on his contract with Färjestad was ended on 7 May 2019.

On 12 June 2019, Johansson as a free agent signed his first contract abroad, agreeing to a one-year deal with German club, Grizzlys Wolfsburg of the DEL.

== Career statistics ==
			Regular season					Playoffs
Season	Team	League	GP	G	A	Pts	PIM	GP	G	A	Pts	PIM
2005–06	IF Troja/Ljungby	Div.1	3	0	0	0	2	—	—	—	—	—
2006–07	IF Troja/Ljungby	Div.1	38	10	7	17	44	2	0	0	0	4
2007–08	IF Troja/Ljungby	Div.1	37	17	18	35	58	8	1	3	4	12
2008–09	IF Troja/Ljungby	Allsv	44	4	17	21	38	2	1	0	1	0
2009–10	IF Troja/Ljungby	Allsv	46	2	20	22	38	—	—	—	—	—
2010–11	Rögle BK	Allsv	41	8	9	17	30	10	1	3	4	10
2011–12	Rögle BK	Allsv	35	13	10	23	22	10	3	4	7	8
2012–13	Växjö Lakers	SEL	50	5	6	11	12	—	—	—	—	—
2013–14	Växjö Lakers	SHL	54	6	9	15	34	12	6	4	10	14
2014–15	Växjö Lakers	SHL	51	7	8	15	61	18	0	1	1	8
2015–16	Växjö Lakers	SHL	43	9	9	18	18	13	1	3	4	6
2016–17	Färjestad BK	SHL	47	15	17	32	58	7	3	3	6	2
2017–18	Färjestad BK	SHL	28	5	6	11	18	6	1	1	2	6
2018–19	Färjestad BK	SHL	14	0	4	4	26	14	1	1	2	8
2018–19	Färjestad BK	J20	1	0	1	1	0	—	—	—	—	—
2019–20	Grizzlys Wolfsburg	DEL	43	8	8	16	36	—	—	—	—	—
2020–21	Halmstad Hammers HC	Div.1	22	12	14	26	4	—	—	—	—	—
2020–21	Linköping HC	SHL	10	3	2	5	0	—	—	—	—	—
2021–22	Linköping HC	SHL	52	4	9	13	22	—	—	—	—	—
SHL totals			349	54	70	124	249	70	12	13	25	44

== Awards and honors ==
Award	Year
SHL
Le Mat trophy (Växjö Lakers)	2015
