= Noah Welch =

American ice hockey player (born 1982)

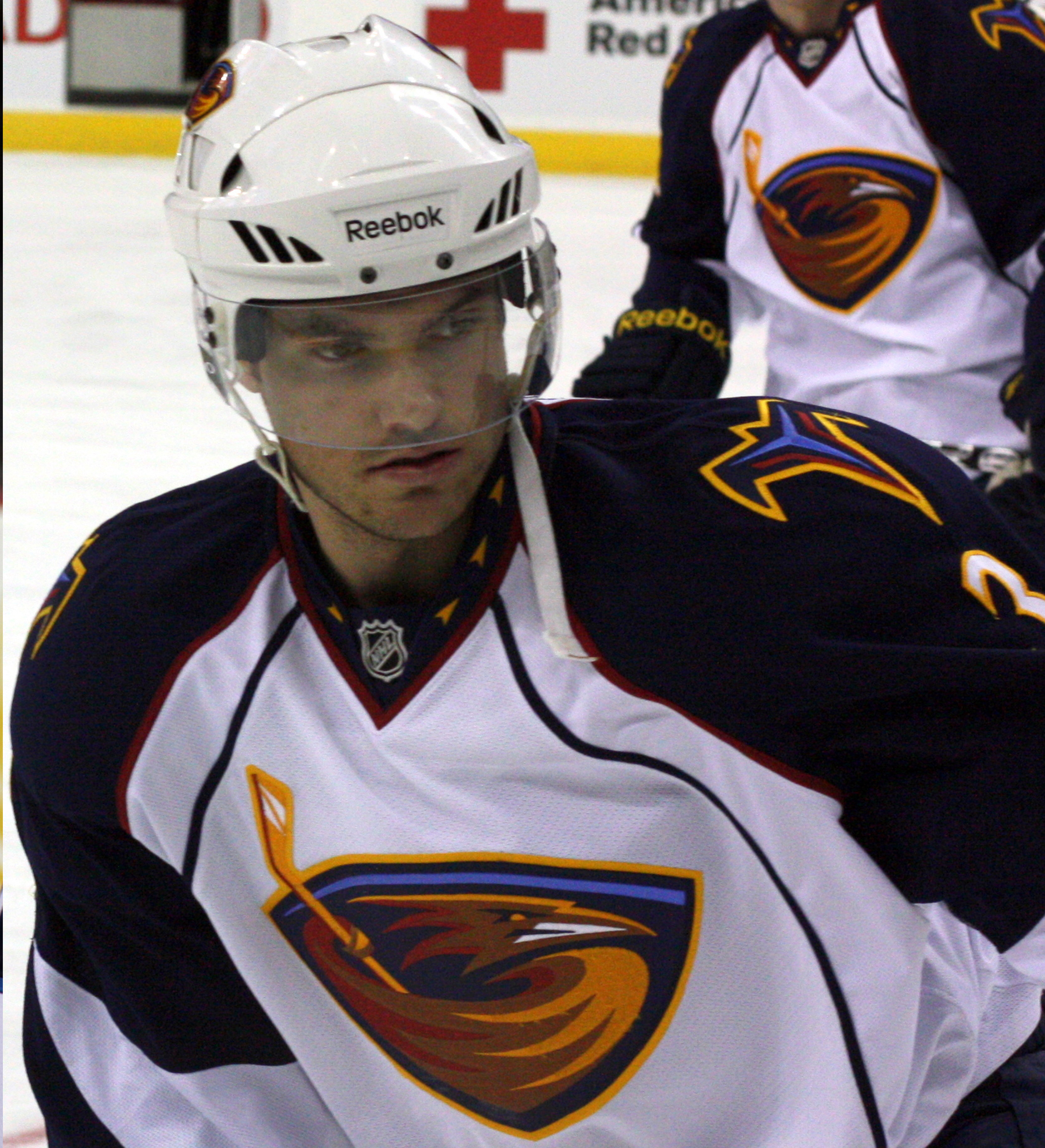
- Noah Welch with the Atlanta Thrashers in March 2011.
- Born: August 26, 1982 (age 44) Brighton, Massachusetts, USA
- Height: 6 ft 4 in (193 cm)
- Weight: 212 lb (96 kg; 15 st 2 lb)
- Position: Defense
- Shot: Left
- Played for: Pittsburgh Penguins; Florida Panthers; Tampa Bay Lightning; Atlanta Thrashers; HV71; Växjö Lakers; Modo Hockey; Malmö Redhawks
- National team: United States
- NHL draft: 54th overall, 2001; Pittsburgh Penguins
- Playing career: 2005–2018

Noah Paul Welch (born August 26, 1982) is Christian and an American former professional ice hockey defenseman who played in the National Hockey League (NHL) with the Pittsburgh Penguins, Florida Panthers, Tampa Bay Lightning and the Atlanta Thrashers. Welch completed his professional career in Europe, most notably winning two Swedish Hockey League championships with the Växjö Lakers.

Welch was an alternate captain for the United States at the 2018 Winter Olympics in South Korea.

== Playing career ==
Welch was drafted by the Pittsburgh Penguins in the 2001 NHL entry draft, chosen 54th overall in the 2nd round. Noah was the captain of the Harvard University Hockey team, graduating in 2005. Before his college career at Harvard he played high school hockey at St. Sebastian's School in Needham, Massachusetts.

Welch made his NHL debut in the latter stages of the 2005–2006 season for the Penguins in a victory over the NY Islanders picking up his first NHL point with an assist. In his next game against the Montreal Canadiens, having replaced the suspended Eric Cairns, he suffered a nightmare start, scoring in his own net, but made amends by scoring his first NHL goal in the third period against the team he always cheered against as a child and Boston Bruins fan. In total he scored four points (one goal, three assists) in five games. He was named to the AHL 2007 All-Star game, representing the Wilkes-Barre/Scranton Penguins.

On February 27, 2007, Welch was traded by the Penguins to the Florida Panthers in exchange for Gary Roberts. After two seasons with the Panthers, Welch was traded along with a third round draft pick to the Tampa Bay Lightning for defenseman Steve Eminger. A short time after that, he instead signed a one-year contract with the Atlanta Thrashers.

For season 2011–12, Welch signed a one-year contract with the Swedish team HV71 in the Swedish elite league Elitserien (SEL). He scored 10 points in 51 games. In May 2012 he signed a one-year contract with the SEL team Växjö Lakers and eventually stayed three years in Växjö, helping the club capture the 2015 SEL championship, while being presented with the Stefan Liv Memorial Trophy as MVP of the SHL playoffs.

He left the Lakers after winning the title and then spent one season with Modo Hockey, before signing with fellow SHL side Malmö Redhawks for the 2016–17 campaign.

Welch returned to the Lakers for his final professional season in 2017–18. While largely affected throughout the season with injury, Welch retired after helping the Lakers claim their second Swedish Championship. Welch now owns and operates The Dome Red Deer, a 107,000 square foot state of the art athletic development facility in Red Deer, Alberta. He was inducted into the Harvard Athletics Hall of Fame in 2023.

== Personal ==
Born and raised in Boston (Brighton) Massachusetts, as a young boy Welch dreamed of playing in the NHL and Olympics. Welch became a Christian in 2008 while playing for the Florida Panthers. He has decided to donate his brain to concussion research at the Center for the Study of Traumatic Encephalopathy at the Boston University School of Medicine after his death. He has a degree in government from Harvard. In the summer of 2011, Welch married teammate Paul Postma's sister Alissa Postma.

== Career statistics ==
=== Regular season and playoffs ===
			Regular season					Playoffs
Season	Team	League	GP	G	A	Pts	PIM	GP	G	A	Pts	PIM
1999–2000	Saint Sebastian's School	HS–Prep	26	4	11	15	35	—	—	—	—	—
2000–01	Saint Sebastian's School	HS–Prep	30	11	20	31	37	—	—	—	—	—
2001–02	Harvard University	ECAC	27	5	6	11	56	—	—	—	—	—
2002–03	Harvard University	ECAC	34	6	22	28	70	—	—	—	—	—
2003–04	Harvard University	ECAC	34	6	13	19	58	—	—	—	—	—
2004–05	Harvard University	ECAC	34	6	12	18	86	—	—	—	—	—
2005–06	Wilkes–Barre/Scranton Penguins	AHL	77	9	20	29	99	11	1	0	1	18
2005–06	Pittsburgh Penguins	NHL	5	1	3	4	2	—	—	—	—	—
2006–07	Wilkes–Barre/Scranton Penguins	AHL	27	5	16	21	24	—	—	—	—	—
2006–07	Pittsburgh Penguins	NHL	22	1	1	2	22	—	—	—	—	—
2006–07	Florida Panthers	NHL	2	1	0	1	2	—	—	—	—	—
2006–07	Rochester Americans	AHL	11	2	4	6	21	6	0	2	2	12
2007–08	Florida Panthers	NHL	4	0	0	0	7	—	—	—	—	—
2008–09	Florida Panthers	NHL	23	1	1	2	11	—	—	—	—	—
2008–09	Rochester Americans	AHL	7	0	3	3	10	—	—	—	—	—
2008–09	Tampa Bay Lightning	NHL	17	0	0	0	14	—	—	—	—	—
2009–10	Chicago Wolves	AHL	37	1	4	5	33	14	0	2	2	10
2010–11	Chicago Wolves	AHL	50	2	11	13	65	—	—	—	—	—
2010–11	Atlanta Thrashers	NHL	2	0	0	0	0	—	—	—	—	—
2011–12	HV71	SEL	51	4	6	10	85	6	1	1	2	0
2012–13	Växjö Lakers	SEL	43	8	9	17	56	—	—	—	—	—
2013–14	Växjö Lakers	SHL	43	2	17	19	82	12	2	2	4	10
2014–15	Växjö Lakers	SHL	52	5	23	28	100	17	2	4	6	53
2015–16	Modo Hockey	SHL	32	3	13	16	56	—	—	—	—	—
2016–17	Malmö Redhawks	SHL	51	2	9	11	79	13	1	1	2	18
2017–18	Växjö Lakers	SHL	26	4	5	9	63	3	0	0	0	0
AHL totals			209	19	58	77	252	31	1	4	5	40
NHL totals			75	4	5	9	58	—	—	—	—	—
SHL totals			298	28	82	110	521	58	6	11	17	91

=== International ===
Year	Team	Event	Result	GP	G	A	Pts	PIM
2018	United States	OG	7th	5	0	0	0	4
Senior totals				5	0	0	0	4

== Awards and honors ==
Award	Year
College
All-ECAC Hockey Rookie Team	2002
All-ECAC Hockey Second Team	2003
AHCA East Second-Team All-American	2003
ECAC All-Conference Honorable Mention	2004
All-ECAC Hockey First Team	2005
AHCA East First-Team All-American	2005
SHL
Stefan Liv Memorial Trophy	2015
Le Mat Trophy (Växjö Lakers)	2015, 2018
