= Fredrik Lindgren (ice hockey) =

Swedish ice hockey player

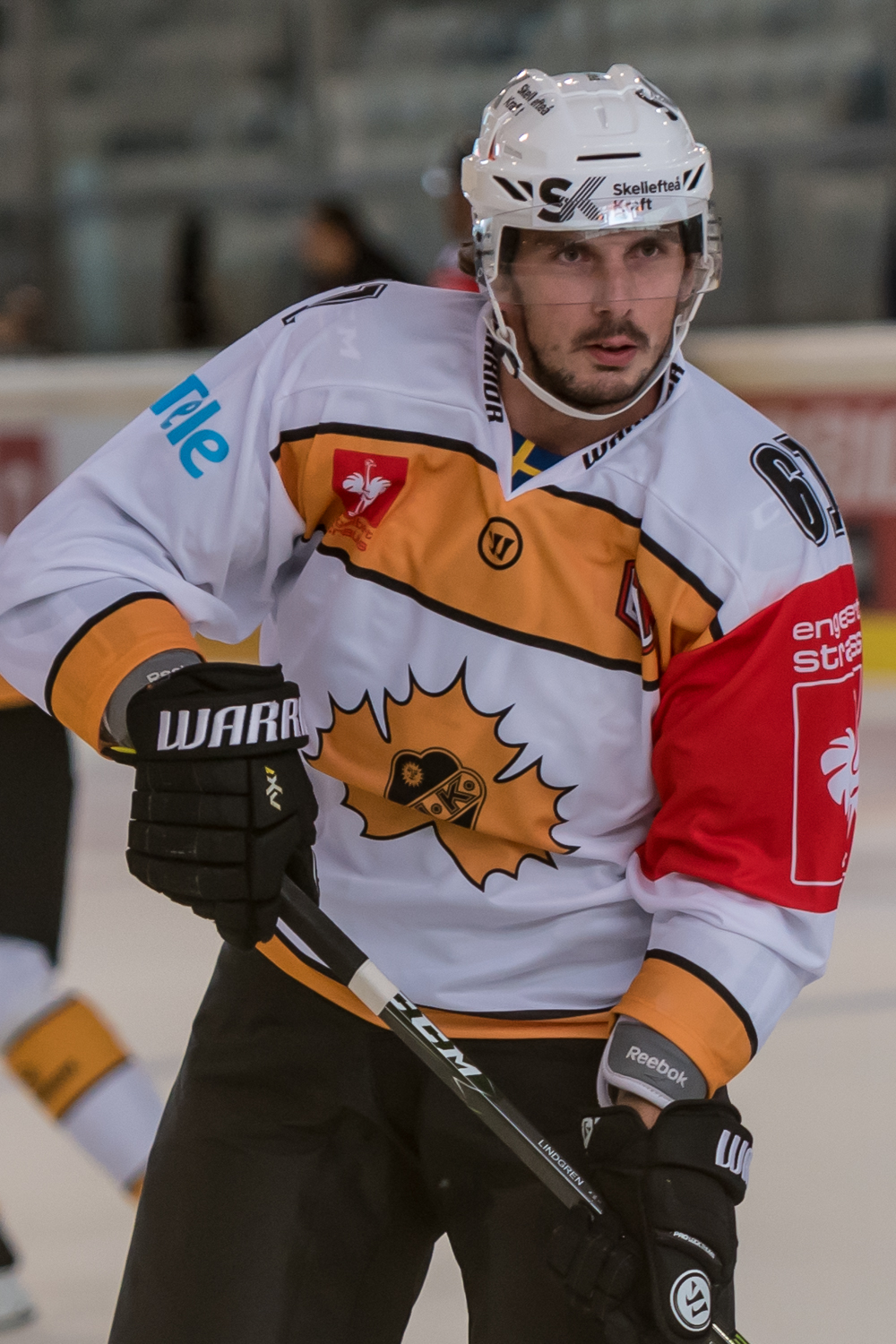
- Born: October 3, 1980 (age 44); Arvidsjaur, Sweden
- Height: 5 ft 11 in (180 cm)
- Weight: 192 lb (87 kg; 13 st 10 lb)
- Position: Defence
- Shot: Left
- Played for: Skellefteå AIK
- Playing career: 2002–2019

Fredrik Lindgren is a Swedish former professional ice hockey defenceman. He played the entirety of his career with Skellefteå AIK of the Swedish Hockey League.

== Career statistics ==
| | | | Regular season | | | | | Playoffs |
| Season | Team | League | GP | G | A | Pts | PIM | GP | G | A | Pts | PIM |
|---|---|---|---|---|---|---|---|---|---|---|---|---|
| 1997–98 | IFK Arvidsjaur | Division 2 | 20 | 0 | 2 | 2 | — | — | — | — | — | — |
| 1998–99 | IFK Arvidsjaur | Division 2 | 25 | 2 | 7 | 9 | — | — | — | — | — | — |
| 1999–00 | Skellefteå AIK J20 | J20 SuperElit | 21 | 1 | 4 | 5 | 26 | — | — | — | — | — |
| 1999–00 | Skellefteå AIK | Allsvenskan | 16 | 1 | 1 | 2 | 8 | 5 | 0 | 0 | 0 | 4 |
| 2000–01 | Skellefteå AIK | Allsvenskan | 35 | 0 | 4 | 4 | 14 | 2 | 0 | 0 | 0 | 0 |
| 2001–02 | Mörrums GoIS IK | Allsvenskan | 42 | 2 | 8 | 10 | 26 | 9 | 3 | 4 | 7 | 8 |
| 2002–03 | Skellefteå AIK | Allsvenskan | 38 | 3 | 4 | 7 | 14 | 10 | 0 | 0 | 0 | 4 |
| 2003–04 | Skellefteå AIK | Allsvenskan | 45 | 2 | 4 | 6 | 53 | 10 | 0 | 0 | 0 | 0 |
| 2004–05 | Skellefteå AIK | Allsvenskan | 45 | 4 | 4 | 8 | 12 | 10 | 0 | 0 | 0 | 8 |
| 2005–06 | Skellefteå AIK | HockeyAllsvenskan | 38 | 4 | 5 | 9 | 42 | 10 | 0 | 2 | 2 | 12 |
| 2006–07 | Skellefteå AIK | Elitserien | 52 | 3 | 3 | 6 | 52 | — | — | — | — | — |
| 2007–08 | Skellefteå AIK | Elitserien | 54 | 0 | 6 | 6 | 40 | 5 | 0 | 0 | 0 | 4 |
| 2008–09 | Skellefteå AIK | Elitserien | 16 | 0 | 0 | 0 | 2 | 3 | 0 | 0 | 0 | 0 |
| 2009–10 | Färjestad BK | Elitserien | 45 | 4 | 8 | 12 | 26 | 5 | 0 | 0 | 0 | 2 |
| 2010–11 | Skellefteå AIK | Elitserien | 51 | 5 | 14 | 19 | 38 | 18 | 2 | 6 | 8 | 18 |
| 2011–12 | Skellefteå AIK | Elitserien | 54 | 5 | 8 | 13 | 26 | 19 | 0 | 6 | 6 | 14 |
| 2012–13 | Skellefteå AIK | Elitserien | 50 | 2 | 11 | 13 | 24 | 9 | 0 | 4 | 4 | 2 |
| 2013–14 | Skellefteå AIK | SHL | 51 | 0 | 7 | 7 | 28 | 14 | 1 | 2 | 3 | 8 |
| 2014–15 | Skellefteå AIK | SHL | 46 | 1 | 7 | 8 | 40 | 15 | 0 | 1 | 1 | 8 |
| 2015–16 | Skellefteå AIK | SHL | 41 | 1 | 8 | 9 | 18 | 14 | 0 | 3 | 3 | 8 |
| 2016–17 | Skellefteå AIK | SHL | 50 | 0 | 5 | 5 | 14 | 7 | 0 | 1 | 1 | 2 |
| 2017–18 | Leksands IF | HockeyAllsvenskan | 34 | 0 | 7 | 7 | 26 | — | — | — | — | — |
| 2017–18 | Skellefteå AIK | SHL | 7 | 0 | 0 | 0 | 4 | 16 | 0 | 3 | 3 | 4 |
| 2018–19 | Skellefteå AIK | SHL | 49 | 3 | 4 | 7 | 47 | 5 | 0 | 0 | 0 | 0 |
| 2020–21 | SK Lejon | Hockeyettan | 1 | 0 | 1 | 1 | 0 | — | — | — | — | — |
| 2020–21 | Boden Hockey | Hockeyettan | 4 | 0 | 1 | 1 | 4 | 5 | 1 | 0 | 1 | 0 |
| 2022–23 | Clemensnäs HC | Division 2 | 1 | 0 | 0 | 0 | 0 | 5 | 0 | 5 | 5 | 4 |
| SHL (Elitserien) totals | | | 566 | 24 | 81 | 105 | 359 | 130 | 3 | 26 | 29 | 70 |
