= Teemu Lassila =

Finnish ice hockey player (born 1983)

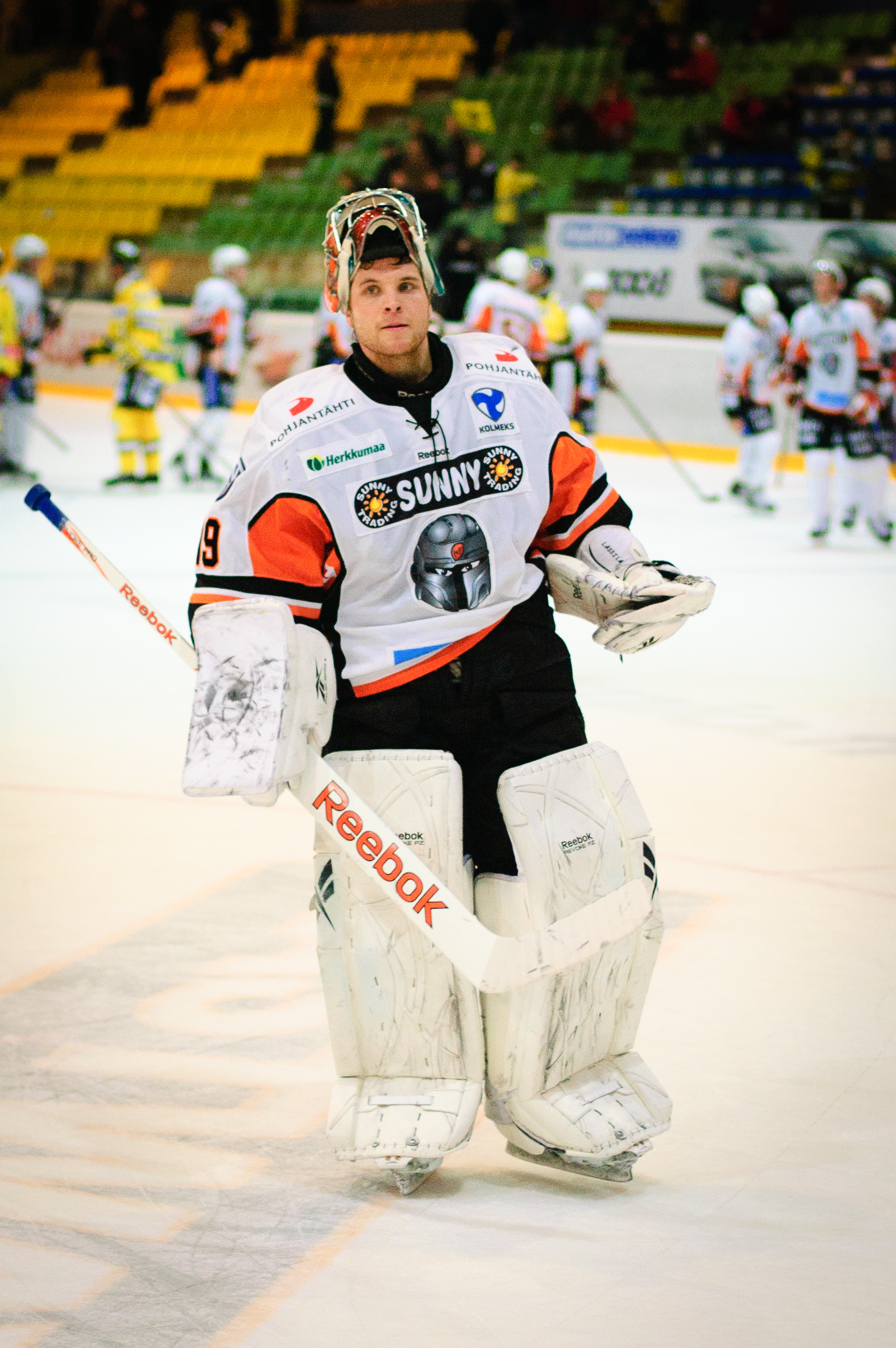
- Born: 26 March 1983 (age 43) Helsinki, Finland
- Height: 6 ft 0 in (183 cm)
- Weight: 192 lb (87 kg; 13 st 10 lb)
- Position: Goaltender
- Caught: Left
- Played for: HC TPS; Ässät; Djurgårdens IF; HPK; Metallurg Novokuznetsk; Barys Astana; Avangard Omsk; Växjö Lakers; Tappara; HC '05 Banská Bystrica; Orli Znojmo
- National team: Finland
- NHL draft: 117th overall, 2003; Nashville Predators
- Playing career: 2002–2020
Medal record
World Championships
Gold medal – first place	2011 Slovakia

Teemu Lassila (born 26 March 1983) is a Finnish former professional ice hockey goaltender. He most recently played in the 2019–20 season of the Austrian Hockey League (EBEL) with the Czech team Orli Znojmo. He appeared in three games at the 2011 IIHF World Championship as a member of the gold medal-winning Finland men's national ice hockey team.

Lassila was selected by the Nashville Predators in the 4th round (117th overall) of the 2003 NHL entry draft, but he never played in the National Hockey League.
