= Jesper =

- Gender: male

Origin
- Origin: Persian
- Meaning: Treasurer

Other names
- Related names: Caspar, Gasparo, Jasper, Jespa, Kacper, Gesù, Gasper

Jesper is a given name common in Scandinavian countries believed to be of ancient Persian origin, meaning "Treasurer".

Notable people and fictional characters with the name include:

== People ==
- Jesper Jensen Aabo (born 1991), Danish ice hockey player
- Jesper Agergård (born 1975), Danish cyclist
- Jesper Ahle (born 1981), Danish handball player
- Jesper Alasaari (born 1995), Swedish ice hockey player
- Jesper Andersen (born 1979), Danish footballer
- Jesper Appel (born 1993), Swedish ice hockey player
- Jesper Arbinge (born 1997), Swedish shot putter
- Jesper Arvidsson (born 1985), Swedish footballer
- Jesper Asholt (born 1960), Danish actor
- Jesper Asselman (born 1990), Dutch cyclist
- Jesper Baehrenz (born 1965), Danish radio personality
- Jesper Bank (born 1957), Danish sailor and Olympic champion
- Jesper Bärgård (born 1993), Swedish ice hockey player
- Jesper Bech (born 1982), Danish footballer
- Jesper Bengtsson (born 1971), Swedish footballer
- Jesper Bie (born 1920), Danish badminton player
- Jesper Björkman (born 1993), Swedish footballer
- Jesper Björnlund (born 1985), Swedish freestyle skier
- Jesper Blicher (born 1988), Danish footballer
- Jesper Blomqvist (born 1974), Swedish footballer
- Jesper Bodilsen (born 1970), Danish jazz double bassist
- Jesper Boqvist (born 1998), Swedish ice hockey player
- Jesper Borgen (born 1988), Norwegian producer & songwriter
- Jesper Bratt (born 1998), Swedish ice hockey player
- Jesper Brechtel (born 1994), Finnish footballer
- Jesper Brochmand (1585–1652), Danish clergyman
- Jesper Brodin (born 1968), Swedish business executive
- Jesper Ceesay (born 2001), Gambian association footballer
- Jesper Christensen (born 1948), Danish actor
- Jesper Bøje Christensen (born 1944), Danish musicologist and harpsichordist
- Jesper Christiansen (footballer, born 1978), Danish footballer
- Jesper Christiansen (footballer, born 1980), Danish footballer
- Jesper deClaville Christiansen (born 1963), Danish materials scientist
- Jesper Christjansen (born 1987), Danish footballer
- Jesper Cornelius (born 2001), Danish footballer
- Jesper Crusebjörn (1843–1904), Swedish politician and officer
- Jesper Mattson Cruus af Edeby (1576–1622), Swedish soldier and politician
- Jesper Dahl, the birthname of Jokeren (born 1973), Danish hip-hop artist and rapper
- Jesper Dahlbäck (born 1974), Swedish techno DJ and producer
- Jesper Dahlroth (born 1991), Swedish professional ice hockey player
- Jesper Daland (born 2000), Norwegian footballer
- Jesper Damgaard (born 1975), Danish ice hockey player
- Jesper Drost (born 1993), Dutch footballer
- Jesper Duus (born 1967), Danish ice hockey player
- Jesper Eliasson (born 2000), Swedish ice hockey player
- Jesper Engström (born 1992), Finnish footballer
- Jesper Ericsson (born 1983), Swedish bandy player
- Jesper Eriksson (born 1996), Swedish ice hockey player
- Jesper Ewald (1893–1969), Danish writer
- Jesper Falck (born 1970), Danish football manager and former player
- Jesper Fast (born 1991), Swedish ice hockey player
- Jesper Faurschou (born 1983), Danish athlete
- Jesper Florén (born 1990), Swedish footballer
- Jesper Fredberg (born 1981), Danish football coach and executive
- Jesper Frismann (born 1961), Danish dressage rider
- Jesper Fritz (born 1985), Swedish pole vaulter
- Jesper Frödén (born 1994), Swedish ice hockey player
- Jesper Gregersen (born 2004), Norwegian footballer
- Jesper Grønkjær (born 1977), Danish footballer
- Jesper Guldbrandsen (1935–2012), Danish hockey player
- Jesper Gustavsson (born 1994), Swedish footballer
- Jesper Håkansson (born 1981), Danish footballer
- Jesper Hansen (cricketer) (born 1980), Danish cricketer
- Jesper Hansen (cyclist) (born 1990), Danish cyclist
- Jesper Hansen (football manager) (born 1963), Danish football manager and former player
- Jesper Hansen (footballer, born 1985) (born 1985), Danish footballer
- Jesper Hansen (sport shooter) (born 1980), Danish sport shooter
- Jesper Harding (1799–1865), American publisher
- Jesper Helledie (born 1954), Danish badminton player
- Jesper Hellström (born 1995), Swedish triple jumper
- Jesper Henriksen (c. 1425 – before 1493), Danish noble
- Jesper von Hertzen (born 1980), Finnish badminton player
- Jesper Hjorth (born 1975), Danish footballer
- Jesper Hoffmeyer (1942–2019), Danish biologist
- Jesper Højer (born 1978), Danish businessman
- Jesper Holmris (born 1970), Danish handball coach
- Jesper Høm (1931–2000), Danish photographer and film director
- Jesper Horsted (born 1997), American football player
- Jesper Hougaard (born 1983), Danish poker player
- Jesper Isaksen (born 1999), Norwegian footballer
- Jesper Jansson (born 1971), Swedish footballer
- Jesper Jensen (footballer) (born 1988), Danish footballer
- Jesper Jensen (handballer) (born 1977), Danish handball player
- Jesper Jensen (ice hockey, born 1987) (born 1987), Danish ice hockey player
- Jesper Jenset (born 1997), Norwegian singer and songwriter
- Jesper Johansson (born 1993), Swedish ice hockey player
- Jesper de Jong (born 2000), Dutch tennis player
- Jesper Jørgensen (born 1984), Danish footballer
- Jesper Jørgensen (footballer, born 1983), Danish footballer
- Jesper Juelsgård (born 1989), Danish footballer
- Jesper Just (born 1974), Danish artist
- Jesper Juul (family therapist) (1948–2019), Danish therapist and author
- Jesper Juul (game researcher), Danish academic
- Jesper Karlsson (born 1998), Swedish footballer
- Jesper Karlsson (footballer, born 2000), Finnish footballer
- Jesper Skalberg Karlsson (born 1993), Swedish politician
- Jesper Karlström (born 1995), Swedish footballer
- Jesper Kennegård (born 1988), Swedish professional golfer
- Jesper Kjærulff (born 1983), Danish footballer
- Jesper Klein (1944–2011), Danish actor
- Jesper Knudsen (badminton) (born 1960), Danish badminton player
- Jesper Knudsen (painter) (born 1964), Danish painter
- Jesper Knudsen (speedway rider) (born 2004), Danish speedway rider
- Jesper Koch (born 1967), Danish composer
- Jesper Kongstad, Danish patent official
- Jesper Konradsson (born 1994), Swedish handball player
- Jesper Kristensen (born 1971), Danish footballer
- Jesper M. Kristensen (born 1986), Danish footballer
- Jesper Kristiansen (speedway rider) (born 1985), Danish speedway rider
- Jesper Thusgård Kristiansen (born 1966), Danish rower
- Jesper Kristoffersen (born 1984), Danish footballer
- Jesper Kyd (born 1972), Danish composer and sound designer
- Jesper Langballe (1939–2014), Danish priest, author and politician
- Jesper Langberg (1940–2019), Danish actor
- Jesper Lange (born 1986), Danish footballer
- Jesper Larsen (born 1972), Danish badminton player
- Jesper Larsson (born 1973), Swedish handball player
- Jesper Lauridsen (born 1991), Danish footballer
- Jesper Leerdam (born 1987), Dutch footballer
- Jesper Lindgren (born 1997), Swedish ice hockey player
- Jesper Lindstrøm (born 2000), Danish footballer
- Jesper Ljung (born 1973), Swedish footballer and manager
- Jesper Löfgren (born 1997), Swedish footballer
- Jesper Lundgaard (born 1954), Danish bassist, bandleader, and composer
- Jesper Lützen (born 1951), Danish mathematician
- Jesper Manns (born 1995), Swedish footballer
- Jesper Mathisen (born 1987), Norwegian footballer
- Jesper Mattson (born 1995), Swedish ice hockey player
- Jesper Mattsson (footballer) (born 1968), Swedish footballer
- Jesper Mattsson (ice hockey) (born 1975), Swedish ice hockey player
- Jesper Meinby (born 1987), Danish handball player
- Jesper Mikkelsen (born 1980), Danish footballer
- Jesper Modig (born 1994), Swedish footballer
- Jesper Modin (born 1988), Swedish cross-country skier
- Jesper Mogensen, Danish neuroscientist
- Jesper Møller (animator) (born 1953), Danish animator
- Jesper Møller (football executive) (born 1963), Danish lawyer and sports executive
- Jesper Møller (mathematician) (born 1957), Danish mathematician
- Jesper B. Monberg (born 1977), Danish speedway rider
- Jesper Monrad (born 1976), Danish handball player and coach
- Jesper Mørkøv (born 1988), Danish cyclist
- Jesper Myrfors, American artist
- Jesper Nelin (born 1992), Swedish biathlete
- Jesper Nielsen (born 1989), Swedish handball player
- Jesper W. Nielsen (born 1962), Danish film director and editor
- Jesper Nøddesbo (born 1980), Danish handball player
- Jesper Nohrstedt (born 1994), Danish singer
- Jesper Nordin (Swedish composer) (born 1971), Swedish composer
- Jesper Nyberg (born 1994), Swedish sport shooter
- Jesper Nygart (born 1956), Danish doctor
- Jesper Nyholm (born 1993), Filipino footballer
- Jesper Odelberg (born 1970), Swedish comedian
- Jesper Olesen (born 1980), Danish footballer
- Jesper Ollas (born 1984), Swedish ice hockey player
- Jesper Olofsson (born 1992), Swedish professional ice hockey player
- Jesper Olsen (born 1961), Danish footballer
- Jesper Olsen (runner) (born 1971), Danish ultra distance runner
- Jesper Olsen (speedway rider) (born 1967), Danish speedway rider
- Jesper Ovesen (born 1954), Danish businessman
- Jesper Parker (born 1984), British handball player
- Jesper Parnevik (born 1965), Swedish professional golfer
- Jesper Pedersen (alpine skier) (born 1999), Norwegian Para alpine skier
- Jesper Pedersen (footballer, born 1961), Danish footballer and manager
- Jesper Bøge Pedersen (born 1990), Danish footballer
- Jesper Petersen (handballer) (born 1953), Danish handball player
- Jesper Petersen (politician) (born 1981), Danish politician
- Jesper Pettersson (born 1994), Swedish ice hockey player
- Jesper Piitulainen (born 1991), Finnish ice hockey player
- Jesper Rasch (born 1998), Dutch cyclist
- Jesper Rask (born 1988), Danish footballer
- Jesper Rasmussen (born 1992), Danish footballer
- Jesper Reitan-Sunde (born 2006), Norwegian footballer
- Jesper Robertsen (born 2004), Norwegian footballer
- Jesper Roesen (born 1975), Danish taekwondo practitioner
- Jesper Rönnbäck (born 1974), Swedish freestyle skier
- Jesper Rönndahl (born 1979), Swedish stand-up comedian
- Jesper Salén (born 1978), Swedish physician and former actor
- Jesper Samuelsson (born 1988), Swedish ice hockey player
- Jesper Sandborg (born 1993), Swedish professional golfer
- Jesper Seier (born 1965), Danish sailor
- Jesper Sellgren (born 1998), Swedish ice hockey player
- Jesper Skaaning, Danish musician, producer and composer
- Jesper Skibby (born 1964), Danish cyclist
- Jesper Smink (born 1997), Dutch judoka
- Jesper Sørensen (born 1973), Danish football manager
- Jesper Staal (born 1972), Danish sprint canoer
- Jesper Stålheim (born 1988), Swedish sailor
- Jesper Storm (born 1982), Danish handball player
- Jesper Strömblad (born 1972), Swedish guitarist
- Jesper Svedberg (musician) (born 1974), Swedish cellist
- Jesper Q. Svejstrup (born 1963), Danish molecular biologist and biochemist
- Jesper Svenbro (born 1944), Swedish poet and classical philologist
- Jesper Svensson (bowler) (born 1995), Swedish professional bowler
- Jesper Svensson (footballer) (born 1990), Swedish footballer
- Jesper Svensson (golfer) (born 1996), Swedish professional golfer
- Jesper Swedberg (1653-1735), Swedish hymnwriter
- Jesper Taaje (born 1997), Norwegian footballer
- Jesper Thilo (1941–2026), Danish jazz musician
- Jesper Thomsen (born 1974), Danish badminton player
- Jesper Thörnberg (born 1991), Swedish ice hockey player
- Jesper Søndergaard Thybo (born 1999), Danish chess grandmaster
- Jesper Thygesen (born 1969), Danish footballer
- Jesper Tjäder (born 1994), Swedish freestyle skier
- Jesper Toft (born 1999), Danish badminton player
- Jesper Tolinsson (born 2003), Swedish footballer
- Jesper Tollefsen (born 1971), Danish football manager
- Jesper Tørring (born 1947), Danish athlete
- Jesper Tydén (born 1975), Swedish stage actor and singer
- Jesper Uneken (born 2004), Dutch footballer
- Jesper Verlaat (born 1996), Dutch footballer
- Jesper Vikman (born 2002), Swedish ice hockey goaltender
- Jesper Waldersten (born 1969), Swedish artist
- Jesper Wallstedt (born 2002), Swedish ice hockey player
- Jesper Westerberg (born 1986), Swedish footballer
- Jesper Westermark (born 1993), Swedish footballer
- Jesper Williamsson (born 1990), Swedish ice hockey player
- Jesper Worre (born 1959), Danish cyclist
- Jesper Ylivainio (born 1997), Swedish ice hockey player

== Fictional characters ==
- Jesper Fahey from the Six of Crows novels
- Jesper Berg from Okkupert 2010s Norwegian television series
- Jesper from the Brotherband series
- Jesper from the Klaus movie

== See also ==
- Jezper Söderlund, also known as Airbase, a Swedish musician specialising in electronic music
- Jasper (given name)
- All Wikipedia article titles beginning with Jesper
