= 2014–15 Färjestad BK season =

Swedish ice hockey club season

2014-15 Färjestad BK
- League: 7th SHL
- 2014-15 record: 21–6–8–20
- Home record: 11–2–5–8
- Road record: 10–4–3–12
- Goals for: 128 (8th)
- Goals against: 135 (7th)

Team information
- General manager: Håkan Loob
- Coach: Tommy Samuelsson
- Assistant coach: Clas Eriksson; Radek Hamr
- Captain: Ole-Kristian Tollefsen
- Alternate captains: Rickard Wallin; Linus Persson (Nov-Mar); Jakub Klepiš (Sept-Nov)
- Arena: Löfbergs Arena
- Average attendance: 5,992

Team leaders
- Goals: Milan Gulaš (20)
- Assists: Milan Gulaš (20)
- Points: Milan Gulaš (40)
- Penalty minutes: Ole-Kristian Tollefsen (90)

The 2014–15 Färjestad BK season was Färjestad BK's 40th season in the Swedish Hockey League (formerly known as Elitserien), the top ice hockey division in Sweden.

== Pre-season ==
=== Champions Hockey League ===
2014–15 Champions Hockey League season; 1–3–1–1 (Home: 1–1–1–0 | Away: 0–2–0–1)
#	Date	Home	Score	Visitor	OT	Goaltender	Venue	Attendance	Record	Pts
1	August 21	Vienna	4–1	Färjestad		Pettersson-Wentzel	Albert Schultz Eishalle	3,650	0–0–0–1	0
2	August 23	ZSC Lions	2–3	Färjestad	OT	Pogge	Hallenstadion	N/A	0–1–0–1	2
3	September 4	Färjestad	4–3	ZSC Lions	OT	Pettersson-Wentzel	Löfbergs Arena	1,714	0–2–0–1	4
4	September 6	Färjestad	1–2	Vienna	SO	Pogge	Löfbergs Arena	1,972	0–2–1–1	5
5	September 23	Färjestad	4–1	Vålerenga		Pogge	Löfbergs Arena	1,121	1–2–1–1	8
6	October 8	Vålerenga	1–2	Färjestad	SO	Pogge	Jordal Amfi	2,465	1–3–1–1	10
Legend: Win (3 points) Win in Overtime/Shootout (2 points) Loss in Overtime/Shootout (1 point) Loss (0 points)

==== Standings ====
Pos	Team	Pld	W	OTW	OTL	L	GF	GA	GD	Pts
1	(Austria) Vienna Capitals	6	4	1	1	0	16	9	+7	15
2	(Switzerland) ZSC Lions	6	2	1	2	1	17	16	+1	10
3	(Sweden) Färjestad BK	6	1	3	1	1	15	13	+2	10
4	(Norway) Vålerenga IF	6	0	0	1	5	7	17	−10	1

=== Pre-season games ===
2014–15 Pre-season
#	Date	Home	Score	Visitor	OT	Venue	Attendance	Record
1	August 2	Färjestad	2–5	Leksand		Sparbanken Arena, Arvika	900	0–0–1
2	August 8	Skövde	1–4	Färjestad		Billingehov, Skövde	2,367	1–0–1
3	August 16	Färjestad	4–5	Växjö		Lionshov, Strömstad	N/A	1–0–2
Legend: Win Win in Overtime/Shootout Loss in Overtime/Shootout Loss

== Regular season ==
2014–15 SHL season; 21–6–8–20 (Home: 11–2–5–8 | Away: 10–4–3–12)

September: 1–2–1–2 (Home: 0–1–0–2 | Away: 1–1–1–0)
#	Date	Home	Score	Visitor	OT	Goaltender	Venue	Attendance	Record	Pts
1	September 11	Leksand	1–2	Färjestad		Pettersson-Wentzel	Tegera Arena	6,361	1–0–0–0	3
2	September 13	Färjestad	2–3	Luleå		Pettersson-Wentzel	Löfbergs Arena	5,380	1–0–0–1	3
3	September 18	Färjestad	2–6	MODO		Pogge	Löfbergs Arena	4,469	1–0–0–2	3
4	September 20	Växjö	3–4	Färjestad	SO	Pettersson-Wentzel	Vida Arena	4,489	1–1–0–2	5
5	September 25	Djurgården	2–1	Färjestad	SO	Pettersson-Wentzel	Hovet	6,974	1–1–1–2	6
6	September 27	Färjestad	3–2	Frölunda	SO	Pettersson-Wentzel	Löfbergs Arena	6,639	1–2–1–2	8

October: 2–1–1–7 (Home: 2–0–0–2 | Away: 0–1–1–5)
#	Date	Home	Score	Visitor	OT	Goaltender	Venue	Attendance	Record	Pts
7	October 2	Skellefteå	2–1	Färjestad		Pettersson-Wentzel	Skellefteå Kraft Arena	4,566	1–2–1–3	8
8	October 4	Färjestad	1–5	Linköping		Pettersson-Wentzel	Löfbergs Arena	5,083	1–2–1–4	8
9	October 10	Brynäs	5–2	Färjestad		Pogge	Gavlerinken Arena	5,189	1–2–1–5	8
10	October 11	Örebro	4–1	Färjestad		Pettersson-Wentzel	Behrn Arena	5,200	1–2–1–6	8
11	October 15	Färjestad	1–2	HV71		Pettersson-Wentzel	Löfbergs Arena	4,853	1–2–1–7	8
12	October 18	Färjestad	6–3	Skellefteå		Pogge	Löfbergs Arena	5,263	2–2–1–7	11
13	October 22	MODO	3–2	Färjestad	SO	Pogge	Fjällräven Center	4,436	2–2–2–7	12
14	October 24	Färjestad	2–3	Djurgården		Pettersson-Wentzel	Löfbergs Arena	6,332	2–2–2–8	12
15	October 25	Linköping	3–0	Färjestad		Pettersson-Wentzel	Saab Arena	5,847	2–2–2–9	12
16	October 28	Frölunda	2–3	Färjestad	SO	Pettersson-Wentzel	Scandinavium	11,035	2–3–2–9	14
17	October 30	Färjestad	3–2	Leksand		Pogge	Löfbergs Arena	7,483	3–3–2–9	17

November: 4–0–3–2 (Home: 2–0–2–0 | Away: 2–0–1–2)
#	Date	Home	Score	Visitor	OT	Goaltender	Venue	Attendance	Record	Pts
18	November 1	Luleå	3–2	Färjestad	SO	Pogge	Coop Norrbotten Arena	5,432	3–3–3–9	18
19	November 13	Färjestad	3–2	Brynäs		Pettersson-Wentzel	Löfbergs Arena	5,026	4–3–3–9	21
20	November 15	Färjestad	2–0	Örebro		Pogge	Löfbergs Arena	6,576	5–3–3–9	24
21	November 18	HV71	0–1	Färjestad		Pogge	Kinnarps Arena	6,870	6–3–3–9	27
22	November 20	Färjestad	1–2	Växjö	OT	Pogge	Löfbergs Arena	4,624	6–3–4–9	28
23	November 22	Brynäs	4–1	Färjestad		Pogge	Gavlerinken Arena	5,693	6–3–4–10	28
24	November 26	Skellefteå	6–1	Färjestad		Pettersson-Wentzel	Skellefteå Kraft Arena	4,485	6–3–4–11	28
25	November 28	Färjestad	5–6	Linköping	SO	Pogge	Löfbergs Arena	4,603	6–3–5–11	29
26	November 29	Örebro	1–2	Färjestad		Pettersson-Wentzel	Behrn Arena	5,200	7–3–5–11	32

December: 3–2–1–1 (Home: 2–1–1–0 | Away: 1–1–0–1)
#	Date	Home	Score	Visitor	OT	Goaltender	Venue	Attendance	Record	Pts
27	December 4	Färjestad	3–2	MODO	SO	Pettersson-Wentzel	Löfbergs Arena	5,007	7–4–5–11	34
28	December 7	Djurgården	2–3	Färjestad	OT	Pettersson-Wentzel	Hovet	7,465	7–5–5–11	36
29	December 11	Färjestad	4–2	HV71		Pogge	Löfbergs Arena	4,555	8–5–5–11	39
30	December 13	Växjö	1–2	Färjestad		Pettersson-Wentzel	Vida Arena	5,235	9–5–5–11	42
31	December 26	Färjestad	0–1	Luleå	SO	Pogge	Löfbergs Arena	7,544	9–5–6–11	43
32	December 28	Färjestad	6–2	Frölunda		Pettersson-Wentzel	Löfbergs Arena	8,011	10–5–6–11	46
33	December 30	Leksand	4–2	Färjestad		Pettersson-Wentzel	Tegera Arena	7,650	10–5–6–12	46

January: 5–1–1–4 (Home: 3–0–1–2 | Away: 2–1–0–2)
#	Date	Home	Score	Visitor	OT	Goaltender	Venue	Attendance	Record	Pts
34	January 3	Färjestad	3–1	Brynäs		Pettersson-Wentzel	Löfbergs Arena	7,158	11–5–6–12	49
35	January 6	Färjestad	2–3	Skellefteå		Pettersson-Wentzel	Löfbergs Arena	7,068	11–5–6–13	49
36	January 8	HV71	1–2	Färjestad		Pogge	Kinnarps Arena	6,753	12–5–6–13	52
37	January 10	Färjestad	5–0	Leksand		Pogge	Löfbergs Arena	7,474	13–5–6–13	55
38	January 15	MODO	1–2	Färjestad		Pogge	Fjällräven Center	4,603	14–5–6–13	58
39	January 17	Färjestad	3–2	Örebro		Pogge	Löfbergs Arena	6,521	15–5–6–13	61
40	January 22	Linköping	4–1	Färjestad		Pettersson-Wentzel	Saab Arena	5,102	15–5–6–14	61
41	January 24	Luleå	1–2	Färjestad	OT	Pogge	Coop Norrbotten Arena	5,432	15–6–6–14	63
42	January 28	Färjestad	2–3	Växjö	OT	Pogge	Löfbergs Arena	5,013	15–6–7–14	64
43	January 30	Frölunda	2–0	Färjestad		Pogge	Scandinavium	10,653	15–6–7–15	64
44	January 31	Färjestad	1–2	Djurgården		Pogge	Löfbergs Arena	7,479	15–6–7–16	64

February: 6–0–1–2 (Home: 2–0–1–1 | Away: 4–0–0–1)
#	Date	Home	Score	Visitor	OT	Goaltender	Venue	Attendance	Record	Pts
45	February 10	Leksand	1–4	Färjestad		Pettersson-Wentzel	Tegera Arena	5,713	16–6–7–16	67
46	February 11	Färjestad	3–2	Linköping		Pogge	Löfbergs Arena	5,168	17–6–7–16	70
47	February 14	Djurgården	2–3	Färjestad		Pettersson-Wentzel	Hovet	7,905	18–6–7–16	73
48	February 17	Skellefteå	1–5	Färjestad		Pogge	Skellefteå Kraft Arena	4,437	19–6–7–16	76
49	February 19	Färjestad	2–3	HV71		Pogge	Löfbergs Arena	6,043	19–6–7–17	76
50	February 21	Brynäs	1–3	Färjestad		Pettersson-Wentzel	Gavlerinken Arena	6,953	20–6–7–17	79
51	February 24	Färjestad	3–4	Frölunda	SO	Pogge	Löfbergs Arena	6,033	20–6–8–17	80
52	February 26	Örebro	3–1	Färjestad		Pettersson-Wentzel	Behrn Arena	5,200	20–6–8–18	80
53	February 28	Färjestad	5–2	MODO		Pogge	Löfbergs Arena	7,037	21–6–8–18	83

March: 0–0–0–2 (Home: 0–0–0–1 | Away: 0–0–0–1)
#	Date	Home	Score	Visitor	OT	Goaltender	Venue	Attendance	Record	Pts
54	March 3	Färjestad	1–3	Luleå		Pogge	Löfbergs Arena	5,335	21–6–8–19	83
55	March 5	Växjö	4–1	Färjestad		Pettersson-Wentzel	Vida Arena	5,009	21–6–8–20	83

Legend: Win (3 points) Win in Overtime/Shootout (2 points) Loss in Overtime/Shootout (1 point) Loss (0 points)

== Player statistics ==
=== Skaters ===
Skaters

Regular season
Player	GP	G	A	Pts	+/-	PIM
Jesper Alasaari	2	0	0	0	0	0
Luciano Aquino	24	3	8	11	−4	4
Niklas Arell	43	1	4	5	6	16
Rasmus Asplund	35	2	1	3	0	4
Ludwig Byström	38	1	4	5	4	18
Victor Ejdsell	12	1	0	1	1	0
Joel Eriksson Ek	34	4	2	6	0	4
Christoffer Forsberg	32	1	0	1	−4	6
Anton Grundel	40	2	3	5	2	12
Milan Gulaš	53	20	20	40	2	26
August Gunnarsson	1	0	0	0	0	0
Daniel Gunnarsson	53	1	8	9	−4	26
Anton Hedman	52	5	11	16	−5	58
Joakim Hillding	44	5	17	22	−2	18
Jesper Jensen	50	0	6	6	−9	43
Martin Karlsson	1	0	0	0	−1	0
Jakub Klepis	21	6	5	11	0	18
Tero Koskiranta	13	1	4	5	1	4
Oliver Kylington	18	2	3	5	−2	4
Shawn Lalonde	50	5	8	13	−5	82
Joakim Nygård	44	9	5	14	−7	10
Johan Olofsson	51	0	2	2	−7	2
Toni Rajala	31	14	13	27	5	12
Joachim Rohdin	50	5	2	7	2	16
Martin Røymark	55	6	7	13	1	12
Anssi Salmela	42	6	17	23	4	28
Tobias Sjökvist	1	0	0	0	0	0
Ole-Kristian Tollefsen	47	2	3	5	−3	90
Rickard Wallin	55	2	13	15	2	52
Per Åslund	52	16	19	35	13	18

Goaltenders

Regular season
Player	GP	TOI	W	L	OT	GA	GAA	SA	SV%	SO	G	A	PIM
Justin Pogge	54	1,642	13	9	4	55	2.01	743	92.60	4	0	0	6
Fredrik Pettersson-Wentzel	53	1,691	10	13	6	72	2.55	745	90.34	0	0	0	0
Adam Werner	3	2	0	0	0	0	0.00	0	0.0	0	0	0	0

== Transactions ==
Acquired
Player	Former team	Date	Notes
Daniel Gunnarsson	Luleå HF	April 28	
Shawn Lalonde	Eisbären Berlin	April 28	
Justin Pogge	BIK Karlskoga	April 28	
Anton Hedman	Luleå HF	April 30	
Linus Persson	Luleå HF	April 30	
Joachim Rohdin	Linköpings HC	April 30	
Luciano Aquino	Dornbirner EC	May 2	
Jesper B. Jensen	Rögle BK	June 19	
Jakub Klepiš	HC Lev Praha	June 26	
Anssi Salmela	HV71	October 18	
Toni Rajala	HC Ugra	November 18	
Tero Koskiranta	HC TPS	January 29	

Leaving
Player	New team	Date	Notes
Jack Connolly	Leksands IF	April 23	
Patrik Lundh	Växjö Lakers	April 28	
Shawn Belle	KHL Medveščak Zagreb	April 28	
Tomáš Hyka	BK Mladá Boleslav	May 6	
Ville Lajunen	Jokerit	May 6	
Pontus Åberg	Nashville Predators	May 8	
Linus Fröberg	BIK Karlskoga	May 8	
Charles Bertrand	Vaasan Sport	May 9	
Pekka Tuokkola	EC KAC	May 21	
Christian Berglund	BIK Karlskoga	June 13	
Anders Bastiansen	Graz 99ers	July 24	
Jakub Klepiš	HC Oceláři Třinec	November 20	
Luciano Aquino	Dornbirner EC	November 20	
