= 2005 ITU Long Distance Triathlon World Championships =

International sports competition

World Long Distance Triathlon Championships
- Location: Fredericia, Denmark
- Date: August 7, 2005

Champions
- Men: Viktor Zemtsev^{(de)} (Ukraine)
- Women: Kathleen Smet (Belgium)

The 2005 ITU Long Distance Triathlon World Championships was a triathlon competition held in Fredericia in Denmark on August 7, 2005, and organized by the International Triathlon Union, now World Triathlon. This was the 12th edition of the competition inaugurated in 1994.

The Elite races for men and women consisted of a 4 km (2.5 mi) swim, 120 km (75 mi) bike and 30 km (19 mi) run, longer than the standard 1.5 km swim, 40 km bike and 10 km run associated with the World Triathlon Championship Series and the Olympic Games, but shorter than the classic Ironman Triathlon event.

Due to technical issues at the race, only the finishing time of each athlete was recorded and published.

== Medal Summary ==
Event	Gold		Silver		Bronze	
Men	Viktor Zemtsev; Ukraine	5:41:40	Marino Vanhoenacker; Belgium	5:41:48	Xavier Le Floch; France	5:41:53
Women	Kathleen Smet; Belgium	6:19:06	Mirinda Carfrae; Australia	6:27:11	Tiina Boman; Finland	6:29:53

== Results ==
The following are the results of the elite races:

=== Men ===
Rank	Athlete	Nation	Overall time
1st place, gold medalist(s)	Viktor Zemtsev	Ukraine	5:41:40
2nd place, silver medalist(s)	Marino Vanhoenacker	Belgium	5:41:48
3rd place, bronze medalist(s)	Xavier Le Floch	France	5:41:53
4	Jonas Colting	Sweden	5:43:17
5	Julien Loy	France	5:43:35
6	Reinaldo Colucci	Brazil	5:45:08
7	Gerrit Schellens	Belgium	5:46:22
8	Francois Chabaud	France	5:48:25
9	Jasper Blake	Canada	5:50:53
10	Marcel Zamora Pérez	Spain	5:51:20
11	Jan Wainer	Czech Republic	5:51:58
12	Jens Koefoed	Denmark	5:52:17
13	Stephen Bayliss	Great Britain	5:52:34
14	Teemu Toivanen	Finland	5:53:23
15	Petr Vabrousek	Czech Republic	5:53:43
16	Ole Stougaard	Denmark	5:55:59
17	Patrick Vernay	France	5:56:29
18	Jimmy Johnsen	Denmark	5:57:33
19	Tamas Petr	Czech Republic	6:02:15
20	Gianpietro De Faveri	Italy	6:03:08
21	Frederic Kohl	Austria	6:04:07
22	Guido Gosselink	Netherlands	6:04:44
23	Russel Kober	Great Britain	6:05:08
24	Jan Vodehnal	Czech Republic	6:05:19
25	Matt Seeley	United States	6:05:58
26	Erih Pecnik	Slovenia	6:06:01
27	Kim Visby Jensen	Denmark	6:06:17
28	Stefano Paoli	Italy	6:06:26
29	Nick Marland	Australia	6:07:42
30	Teemu Lemmettyla	Finland	6:07:53
31	Nick Saunders	South Africa	6:09:04
32	Harald Funk	Germany	6:10:25
33	Federico Girasole	Italy	6:10:45
34	Petteri Mustonen	Finland	6:11:16
35	Jesper Olesen	Denmark	6:11:32
36	Ales Lanik	Czech Republic	6:18:10
37	Werner Uberbacher	Italy	6:19:06
38	Paul Kemper	Germany	6:20:41
39	Michal Kulich	Slovakia	6:32:12
40	Jan Kovalovsky	Czech Republic	6:35:50
41	Marcos Sarquis Hallack Gomes	Brazil	6:38:14
42	Anatoli Novikau	Belarus	6:48:26
Key : DNF - did not finish ; DNS - did not start

=== Women ===
Rank	Athlete	Nation	Overall time
1st place, gold medalist(s)	Kathleen Smet	Belgium	6:19:06
2nd place, silver medalist(s)	Mirinda Carfrae	Australia	6:27:11
3rd place, bronze medalist(s)	Tiina Boman	Finland	6:29:53
4	Yvonne Van Vlerken	Netherlands	6:32:14
5	Nikki Egyed	Australia	6:34:01
6	Charlotte Kolters	Denmark	6:35:27
7	Abigail Bayley	Great Britain	6:37:21
8	Linda Gallo	United States	6:38:11
9	Tamara Kozulina	Ukraine	6:39:55
10	Heleen Bij De Vaate	Netherlands	6:41:27
11	Bella Bayliss	Great Britain	6:44:23
12	Martina Dogana	Italy	6:44:46
13	Rachel Horn	Great Britain	6:47:58
14	Isabelle Ferrer	France	6:48:42
15	Gabriela Loskotova	Czech Republic	6:49:36
16	Natallia Barkun	Belarus	6:51:25
17	Julie Curwin	Canada	6:51:49
18	Estelle Patou	France	6:51:57
19	Nerea Martinez Urruzola	Spain	6:54:02
20	Eva Novakova	Czech Republic	6:55:14
21	Heike Funk	Germany	7:01:34
22	Lotte Branigan	Denmark	7:02:19
23	Laurie Hug	United States	7:03:16
24	Manuela Ianesi	Italy	7:03:32
25	Heather Jorris	United States	7:09:11
26	Diana Macpherson	South Africa	7:09:34
27	Alina Ranceva	Lithuania	7:14:11
28	Yukako Inoue	Japan	7:16:53
29	Rachel Sears Casanta	United States	7:21:12
30	Maja Stage Nielsen	Denmark	7:21:35
31	Trudy Brown	Ireland	7:27:03
32	Tine Jacobsen	Denmark	7:30:03
33	Anne Fallows	Great Britain	7:30:30
34	Michelle Kitze	United States	7:46:18
35	Misa Nonaka	Japan	7:55:36
Key : DNF - did not finish ; DNS - did not start
