= Jasper (given name) =

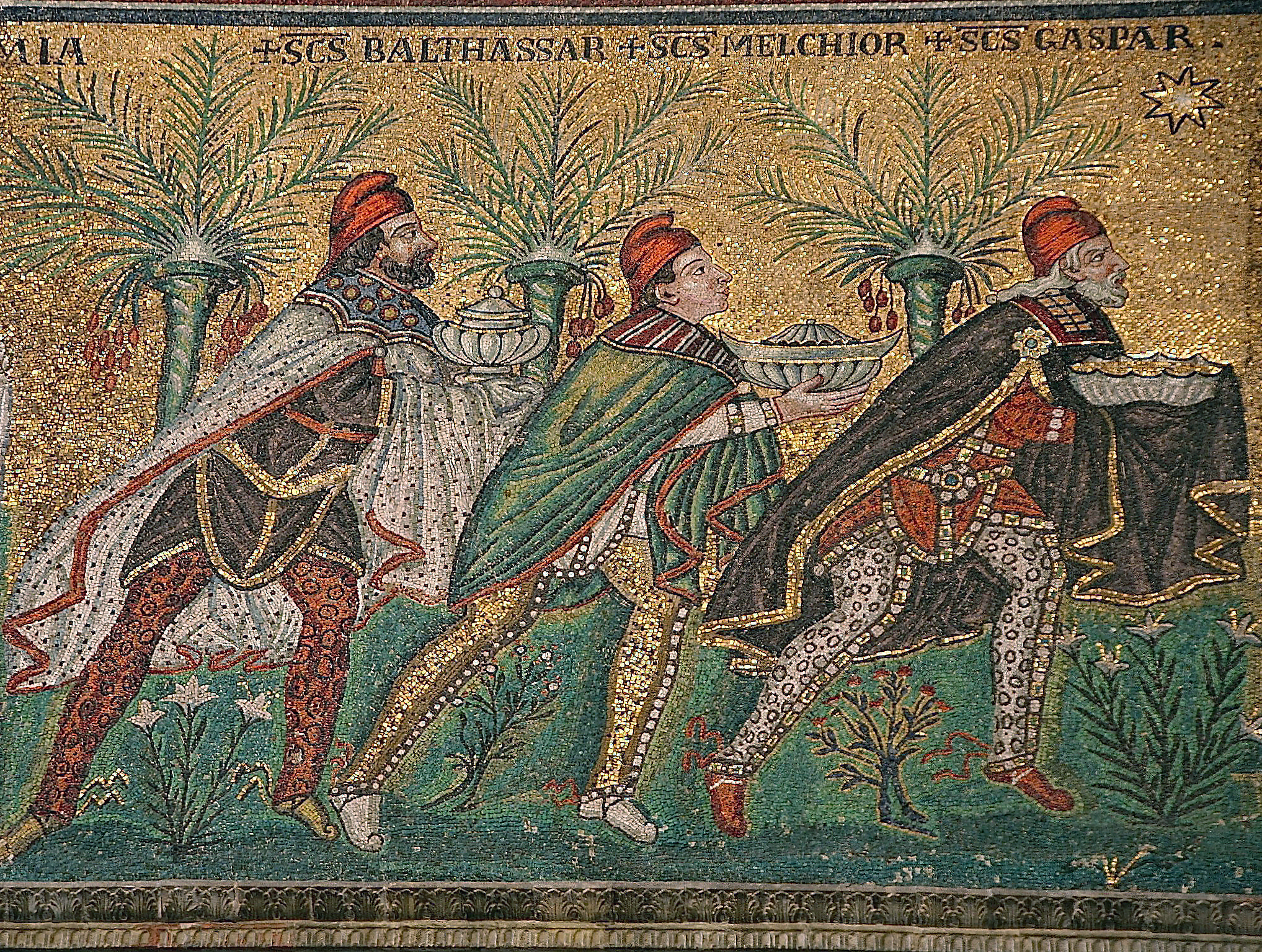
- Jasper is said to have been the name of one of the three wise men who visited Jesus Christ after his birth.
- Pronunciation: /ˈdʒæspər/
- Gender: Mostly male (occasionally unisex)

Origin
- Origin: Persian
- Meaning: Treasurer

Other names
- Related names: Caspar, Kaspar, Kasper, Gasparo, Jesper, Jespa, Kacper (pronounced Katsper)

Jasper is a masculine given name of Persian origin, meaning "treasurer". The etymology of the given name Jasper (of Persian origin) is unrelated to that of the gemstone jasper (of Semitic origin).

Jasper may refer to:

== People ==
=== Arts ===
- Jasper van den Bos (1634–1656), Dutch marine painter
- Jasper Broers (1682–1716), Flemish painter
- Jasper Conran (born 1959), British fashion designer
- Jasper Francis Cropsey (1823–1900), American landscape painter
- Jasper Geeraards (c. 1620-between 1649 and 1654), Flemish painter
- Jasper Johns (born 1930), American painter, sculptor and printmaker
- Jasper Morrison (born 1959), British product and furniture designer
- Jasper Proude, a pseudonym of Brian Howard (1905–1958)

=== Entertainment ===
- Jasper Carrott (born 1945), British comedian
- Jasper Dolphin (born 1990), American actor and rapper
- Jasper Duncombe, 7th Baron Feversham (born 1968), British adult film director
- Jasper Fforde (born 1961), British novelist
- Jasper Fisher (fl. 1639), English divine and dramatist
- Jasper van 't Hof (born 1947), Dutch jazz pianist and keyboard player
- Jasper Liu (born 1986), Taiwanese actor, model and musician
- Jasper Maskelyne (1902–1973), British stage magician
- Jasper Pääkkönen (born 1980), Finnish actor
- Jasper Redd (born 1979), American comedian
- Jasper Steverlinck (born 1976), Belgian Flemish pop rock singer and guitarist
- Jasper (actor) (born 1972), Tamil actor

=== Politics ===
- Jasper Ewing Brady (1797–1871), American politician
- Jasper Culpeper (by 1508–1556/1564), English politician and Member of Parliament
- Jasper Martus, American politician from Michigan
- Jasper McLevy (1878–1962), American mayor
- Jasper More (1907–1987), British politician
- Jasper K. Smith (1905–1992), American politician
- Jasper Tsang (born 1947), Hong Kong politician
- Jasper Tully (1859–1938), Irish politician
- Jasper Wolfe (1872–1952), Irish politician

=== Religion ===
- Jasper Heywood (1535–1598), British theologian
- Jasper Mayne (1604–1672), English clergyman
- Jasper Wilson (1819–1896), American Baptist preacher and politician
- Jasper, one of the biblical magi who were said to have visited the infant Jesus bearing gifts of gold, frankincense and myrrh

=== Sports ===
- Jasper Günther (born 1999), German basketballer
- Jasper Wiese (born 1995), South African rugby union player
- Jasper Cillessen (born 1989), Dutch football goalkeeper
- Jasper Collins (born 1991), Canadian Football League player
- Jasper Harvey (born 1983), American football player
- Jasper Johnson (born 2006), American basketball player
- Jasper Lindsten (born 1994), Finnish ice hockey player
- Jasper Pittard (born 1991), Australian rules footballer
- Jasper Stuyven (born 1992), Belgian racing cyclist
- Jasper Vinall (c. 1590–1624), English cricketer, first cricketer known to have died from an accident during a game
- Jasper Wilson (born 1947), American basketball player

=== Other ===
- Jasper Tudor, Duke of Bedford (1431–1495), uncle of King Henry VII
- Jasper Adams (1793–1841), American clergyman, college professor and college president
- Jasper Becker (born 1956), British author, commentator and journalist
- Jasper S. Bilby (1864–1949), American surveyor
- Jasper Blaxland (1880–1963), English consultant surgeon
- Jasper Danckaerts, 17th-century journal writer and founder of an unsuccessful colony in what is now Maryland
- Jasper Jack Daniel (1849–1911), American distiller and founder of Jack Daniel's Tennessee whiskey distillery
- Jasper Griffin (1937–2019), British literary academic
- Jasper Grosvenor (1794–1857), American financier
- Jasper Kirkby, British experimental particle physicist
- Jasper A. Maltby (1826–1867), American Civil War general
- Jasper Morris (born 1957), Master of Wine, and Burgundy expert
- Jasper Nathaniel (born 1956), American journalist
- Jasper Nicolls (1778–1849), British Army officer and commander-in-chief, India
- Jasper O'Farrell (1817–1875), American surveyor
- Jasper Ridley (1887–1951), British barrister and banker
- Jasper Ridley (1920–2004), British writer and historical biographer
- Jasper Rine (born 1953), American biologist
- Jasper Seagar (died 1721), a pirate active in the Indian Ocean
- Jasper White (born 1954), American chef, restaurateur and cookbook author
- Jasper Yeates (1745–1817), lawyer and Pennsylvania Supreme Court judge

== Fictional characters ==
- Jasper, one of Cruella de Vil's henchmen in Disney's 101 Dalmatians
- Jasper, a ghost of a child who haunts Spooky Island from Rooster Teeth's web series Camp Camp
- Jasper, a carriage driver from Dr. Jekyll and Mr. Hyde
- Jasper (Dr. Stone), a character in the manga series Dr. Stone
- Jasper (Family Guy), a dog and Brian's cousin in the animated TV series Family Guy
- Jasper, a butler from Heaven Can Wait
- Jasper, a controversial black puppet character in George Pal's 1930s–1940s short film series Jasper and the Beanstalk
- Jasper, a female character and villain on the Cartoon Network show Steven Universe
- Jasper, original name of Tom Cat from MGM's Tom and Jerry cartoons
- Jasper Batt, Jr., the main antagonist of the video game No More Heroes 2: Desperate Struggle
- Jasper the Bear, a Canadian cartoon character
- Jasper Beardsley, a recurring character from the animated TV series The Simpsons
- Jasper the Cat, a recurring character from the British TV series Numberjacks
- Jasper Dale, character on Canadian Series Road to Avonlea
- Jasper Dunlop, a main character from the Nickelodeon show Henry Danger
- Jasper Hale, of the Cullen family in Stephenie Meyer's Twilight series
- Jasper Jacks, in the American soap opera General Hospital
- The title character of the 2009 novel Jasper Jones and its 2017 film adaptation
- Jasper Jordan, one of the original 100 juvenile prisoners from the TV series The 100
- Jasper Lamar Crabb, a character spoken of – but not seen – in the 1974 neo-noir film Chinatown, and whose name becomes a pivotal clue in solving a mystery
- Jasper Sitwell, a Marvel Comics spy
- Jasper T. Jowls, a member of Chuck E. Cheese's animatronic band
- Jasper Tempest, the full name of Professor T.
- Jasper de Zoet, a rockstar guitarist and principal character in David Mitchell's novel Utopia Avenue
- Jasper, an antagonist from the video game Dragon Quest XI
- Jasper, one of the main characters in the table top RPG Ordem Paranormal Hexatombe.

== See also ==
- Jesper
