= Sjøkvist =

Sjøkvist, Sjökvist is a Norwegian and Swedish surname. Notable people with the surname include:

- Niklas Sjökvist (born 1970), Swedish ice hockey player
- Sander Sjøkvist (born 1999), Norwegian footballer
- Tobias Sjökvist (born 1995), Swedish ice hockey player
