= 2007 ITU Long Distance Triathlon World Championships =

International sports competition

World Long Distance Triathlon Championships
- Location: Lorient, France
- Date: July 15, 2007
- Competitors: 74 ( 49 men, 25 women)

Champions
- Men: Julien Loy (France)
- Women: Leanda Cave (United Kingdom)

The 2007 ITU Long Distance Triathlon World Championships was a triathlon competition held in Lorient in France on July 15, 2007 and organized by the International Triathlon Union, now World Triathlon. This was the 14th edition of the competition inaugurated in 1994.

The Elite races for men and women consisted of a 3 km (1.9 mi) swim, 80 km (50 mi) bike and 20 km (12 mi) run, longer than the standard 1.5 km swim, 40 km bike and 10 km run associated with the World Triathlon Championship Series and the Olympic Games, but shorter than the classic Ironman Triathlon event.

The 103 kilometre total distance is the shortest course ever to hold the contest, jointly with the 2009 event in Perth.

Alongside the elite professional races, a series of amateur age-group championships were also held.

== Medal Summary ==
Event	Gold		Silver		Bronze	
Men	Julien Loy; France	3:30:11	Xavier Le Floch; France	3:36:19	Sebastien Berlier; France	3:36:41
Women	Leanda Cave; Great Britain	4:04:03	Erika Csomor; Hungary	4:05:20	Catriona Morrison; Great Britain	4:05:57

== Elite Results ==
The following are the results of the elite races:

=== Men ===
49 men took the start line, of which 44 completed the course. The winner was home athlete Julien Loy leading home a French sweep of the medals. Early leader at T2 and reigning champion Torbjorn Sindballe faded to fourth during the run leg.

Rank	Athlete	Nation	Swim	T1	Bike	T2	Run	Overall time
1st place, gold medalist(s)	Julien Loy	France (FRA)	36:57	1:10	1:46:13	1:45	1:04:05	3:30:11
2nd place, silver medalist(s)	Xavier Le Floch	France (FRA)	37:01	1:07	1:49:49	1:37	1:06:44	3:36:19
3rd place, bronze medalist(s)	Sebastien Berlier	France (FRA)	37:17	1:14	1:49:18	1:30	1:07:22	3:36:41
4	Torbjorn Sindballe	Denmark (DEN)	37:14	1:23	1:44:12	2:00	1:12:20	3:37:09
5	Hervé Faure	France (FRA)	38:39	1:15	1:48:04	1:35	1:07:53	3:37:28
6	Olivier Marceau	Switzerland (SUI)	36:53	1:09	1:49:35	1:29	1:09:24	3:38:31
7		Denmark (DEN)	38:43	1:20	1:48:09	1:42	1:08:41	3:38:36
8	Gabriele Pertusati	Italy (ITA)	37:02	1:25	not recorded		1:09:37	3:39:01
9	Reinaldo Colucci	Brazil (BRA)	38:44	1:22	1:51:55	1:40	1:05:35	3:39:16
10	Patrick Vernay	France (FRA)	39:41	1:18	1:49:25	1:40	1:07:18	3:39:21
11	Charly Loisel	France (FRA)	36:50	1:17	1:46:13	1:40	1:13:55	3:39:55
12	Fraser Cartmell	Great Britain (GBR)	36:55	1:12	1:50:03	1:40	1:10:13	3:40:03
13	Francois Chabaud	France (FRA)	38:39	1:13	1:47:41	1:28	1:11:31	3:40:34
14	Cyrille Neveu	France (FRA)	37:16	1:22	1:49:16	1:53	1:11:03	3:40:50
15	Marcel Zamora Pérez	Spain (ESP)	38:37	1:18	1:51:57	1:44	1:07:27	3:41:02
16	Jonas Colting	Sweden (SWE)	37:00	1:21	1:49:17	1:34	1:13:16	3:42:29
17	Jonathan Salerno	United States (USA)	37:05	1:20	1:49:38	1:57	1:12:58	3:42:58
18	Tim Marr	United States (USA)	36:59	1:27	1:49:42	1:37	1:14:14	3:44:00
19	Mike Aigroz	Switzerland (SUI)	37:08	1:10	1:49:48	1:28	1:14:52	3:44:26
20	Stephen Bayliss	Great Britain (GBR)	38:36	1:22	1:51:55	1:30	1:11:42	3:45:04
21	Cyrille Mazure	France (FRA)	38:35	1:15	1:52:15	1:52	1:11:48	3:45:46
22	Joseph Gambles	Great Britain (GBR)	38:46	1:16	1:51:53	1:45	1:12:46	3:46:25
23	Gabriele Mazzetta	Italy (ITA)	38:42	1:22	1:51:51	1:43	1:14:20	3:47:58
24	Mikel Elgezabal Fernandez	Spain (ESP)	40:30	1:49	1:50:55	1:43	1:13:21	3:48:17
25	Brandon Marsh	United States (USA)	37:10	1:21	1:51:58	1:41	1:16:56	3:49:07
26	Alejandro Santamaria Perez	Spain (ESP)	42:01	1:23	1:57:25	1:46	1:07:03	3:49:41
27	Jens Koefoed	Denmark (DEN)	39:39	1:15	1:49:31	1:49	1:18:47	3:51:03
28	Hamish Johnson	New Zealand (NZL)	38:39	1:19	2:00:50	1:30	1:10:18	3:52:39
29	Alun Woodward	Great Britain (GBR)	37:12	1:22	1:53:45	1:51	1:19:21	3:53:30
30	Jamie Whyte	New Zealand (NZL)	39:38	1:23	1:55:55	1:33	1:15:58	3:54:28
31	Leonardo Simoncini	Italy (ITA)	40:15	1:26	2:00:59	1:46	1:10:14	3:54:41
32	Joshua Rix	Australia (AUS)	40:11	1:20	1:57:53	1:57	1:13:54	3:55:15
33	Jens Petersen Bach	Denmark (DEN)	41:02	1:18	1:58:33	1:40	1:12:59	3:55:33
34	Peter Harnold	Slovenia (SLO)	38:39	1:21	2:02:40	1:46	1:13:35	3:58:03
35	Hayato Kawahara	Japan (JPN)	42:06	1:12	2:00:56	1:51	1:12:19	3:58:23
36	Ain-Alar Juhanson	Estonia (EST)	47:46	1:34	1:50:03	2:15	1:17:35	3:59:12
37	Petr Vabrousek	Czech Republic (CZE)	42:06	1:26	1:59:07	1:52	1:14:50	3:59:22
38	Ben Hoffman	United States (USA)	43:00	1:22	1:54:50	1:44	1:19:18	4:00:15
39	Jeffrey Piland	United States (USA)	37:19	1:26	1:58:45	1:51	1:23:07	4:02:30
40	Jeremy Webber	New Zealand (NZL)	44:39	1:31	1:57:30	1:50	1:19:59	4:05:31
41	Greg Thompson	New Zealand (NZL)	50:44	1:33	1:57:25	1:48	1:20:32	4:12:01
42	Fermo Bernasconi	Italy (ITA)	42:01	1:28	2:06:18	2:06	1:21:43	4:13:35
43	Mirko Tisljar	Croatia (CRO)	42:09	1:37	2:06:01	2:29	1:34:04	4:26:19
44	Rafael Braga	Brazil (BRA)	49:52	2:56	2:20:48	5:46	1:56:06	5:15:24
-	Pedro Gomes	Portugal (POR)	40:13	1:28	-	-	-	DNF
-	Filip Kristl	Slovakia (SVK)	38:34	1:23	-	-	-	DNF
-	Lewis Elliot	United States (USA)	40:24	1:29	-	-	-	DNF
-	Viktor Zemtsev	Ukraine (UKR)	39:44	1:15	-	-	-	DNF
-	Matthijs Van Scheijen	Netherlands (NED)	41:15	1:28	1:57:44	2:05	1:26:07	DSQ
Key : DNF - did not finish ; DSQ - disqualifed

=== Women ===
25 women began the race, while 23 women completed the course. Leanda Cave became the second successive British champion, with three of the top five finishers coming from that nation, including bronze medalist Catriona Morrison. Hungarian Erika Csomer overcame a challenging swim to win silver.

Rank	Athlete	Nation	Swim	T1	Bike	T2	Run	Overall time
1st place, gold medalist(s)	Leanda Cave	Great Britain (GBR)	38:29	1:30	2:04:14	1:38	1:18:12	4:04:03
2nd place, silver medalist(s)	Erika Csomor	Hungary (HUN)	46:06	1:57	2:01:58	1:44	1:13:35	4:05:20
3rd place, bronze medalist(s)	Catriona Morrison	Great Britain (GBR)	42:13	1:36	2:02:38	1:53	1:17:38	4:05:57
4	Delphine Pelletier	France (FRA)	41:03	1:36	2:03:51	1:52	1:18:21	4:06:42
5	Chrissie Wellington	Great Britain (GBR)	41:34	1:21	2:10:13	1:45	1:12:14	4:07:07
6	Gina Crawford	New Zealand (NZL)	39:06	1:23	2:06:04	1:48	1:21:08	4:09:29
7	Amy Marsh	United States (USA)	40:27	1:27	2:04:52	1:52	1:22:00	4:10:38
8	Erin Ford	United States (USA)	42:29	1:43	2:05:31	1:52	1:20:33	4:12:07
9	Eva Novakova	Czech Republic (CZE)	38:35	1:42	2:06:41	1:51	1:23:43	4:12:32
10	Charlotte Kolters	Denmark (DEN)	39:35	1:48	2:05:21	2:05	1:24:01	4:12:50
11	Tamara Kozulina	Ukraine (UKR)	47:45	1:25	2:06:55	1:53	1:18:09	4:16:07
12	Linda Gallo	United States (USA)	38:26	1:17	2:06:54	2:09	1:27:56	4:16:42
13	Sara Sig Møller	Denmark (DEN)	44:53	1:52	2:06:14	2:11	1:21:51	4:17:01
14	Yvette Grice	Great Britain (GBR)	41:06	1:31	2:17:30	1:50	1:16:06	4:18:02
15	Nicole Klingler	Liechtenstein (LIE)	47:50	1:25	2:06:48	1:41	1:21:15	4:19:00
16	Martina Dogana	Italy (ITA)	46:03	1:28	2:09:10	1:56	1:21:58	4:20:34
17	Mari Sato	Japan (JPN)	42:02	1:23	2:15:32	1:34	1:22:55	4:23:26
18	Réka Brassay	Hungary (HUN)	47:59	not recorded		1:54	1:16:31	4:24:06
19	Virginie Pilat	France (FRA)	41:37	1:34	2:12:40	2:13	1:27:34	4:25:37
20	Alisha Lion	United States (USA)	46:07	2:01	2:11:34	2:07	1:25:30	4:27:19
21	Kirstien Vleugels	Belgium (BEL)	42:12	1:33	2:11:49	1:52	1:30:20	4:27:47
22	Estelle Leroi	France (FRA)	46:13	1:34	2:06:29	2:04	1:33:32	4:29:53
23	Birgitte Christensen	Denmark (DEN)	47:56	1:28	2:10:55	2:03	1:31:27	4:33:49
-	Johanna Daumas	France (FRA)	39:08	1:47	-	-	-	DNF
-	Simone Buerli	Switzerland (SUI)	41:56	1:37	2:11:58	1:57	-	DNF
Key : DNF - did not finish ; DNS - did not start

== Age-group championships ==
A series of age-group amateur championship races was also held. The medalists in each classification were as follows:

Event	Gold		Silver		Bronze	
Men
20-24	Mikel Calahorra Barrutia; Brunei	4:08:55	Michael Martin; Great Britain	4:11:05	Cédric Largajolli; France	4:12:27
25-29	Simon Billeau; France	3:48:08	Damien Landon; France	4:01:15	Erik Clavery; France	4:01:43
30-34	Laurent Martinou; France	3:58:03	Fréderic Philippe; France	4:03:59	Sébastien Sarda; France	4:07:46
35-39	Xavier Vidonne; France	4:03:58	Jerome Bosmans; Australia	4:04:06	Saso Meden; Slovenia	4:06:11
40-44	Philippe Esnault; France	3:56:10	Sylvain Le Bris; France	3:58:16	Steve Riddle; United States	4:00:08
45-49	Richard Van Diesen; Netherlands	4:04:08	Geoff Ayers; Great Britain	4:11:10	Dominique Avenne; France	4:15:33
50-54	Rob Barel; Netherlands	4:00:23	Rodolphe Von Berg; Belgium	4:03:11	Rob Van Zanten; Netherlands	4:04:36
55-59	Angel Santamaria Cuevas; Spain	4:23:34	Jean Luc Douet; France	4:28:02	Philippe Aller; France	4:36:18
60-64	Mink Zeilstra; Netherlands	4:32:05	Steve Hardwicke; Canada	4:47:09	Marcel Van Der Plas; Netherlands	5:01:30
65-69	Daniel Escoffier; France	4:54:42	Bernard Cuziat; France	5:15:18	Jos Put; Netherlands	5:34:42
70-74	Peter Howard; Great Britain	5:51:29	Neil Fleming; New Zealand	6:09:34	Pentti Miettinen; Finland	6:43:44
75-79	Winston Allen; United States	7:20:09				
Women
20-24	Freya Bloor; Great Britain	4:36:11	Anne Basso; United States	4:40:55	Kristin Hewitt; New Zealand	4:44:10
25-29	Amelie Chehensse; France	4:29:00	Erika Ellis; France	4:38:48	Ziva Petrin; Slovenia	4:42:03
30-34	Laurence De Jaeghere; France	4:25:39	Maureen Forsyth; United States	4:44:26	Lucy Williams; New Zealand	4:45:30
35-39	Aline Choretier; France	4:39:36	Simone Hakenberg; Netherlands	4:40:32	Tracey Horne; Great Britain	4:41:27
40-44	Françoise Theate; Belgium	4:48:28	Jacqueline Miller; United States	4:50:13	Catherine Gance; France	4:51:07
45-49	Nataša Nakrst; Slovenia	4:34:38	Jeannie Fry; Great Britain	4:40:07	Marie-Claude Debroux; France	4:40:18
50-54	Sophie Piat; France	4:58:05	Beverley Dunne; Canada	4:59:01	Nancy Abraham; United States	5:03:11
55-59	Francoise Hantke; France	5:01:32	Terese Van Lare; Netherlands	5:05:31	Denise Everitt; United States	5:10:40
60-64	Hilary Webber; Great Britain	5:37:52	Elisabeth Onisseit; Germany	5:53:02	Janet Thompson; United States	6:13:57
65-69	Daphne Belt; Great Britain	7:16:07				
