= Jesper Jensen =

Jesper Jensen may refer to:

- Jesper Jensen (boxer) (born 1967), Danish boxer
- Jesper Jensen (handballer) (born 1977), Danish handball player
- Jesper Jensen (ice hockey, born 1987), Danish ice hockey forward
- Jesper Jensen (ice hockey, born 1991), Danish ice hockey defenceman
- Jesper B. Monberg (born 1977 as Jesper Bruun Jensen), Danish speedway rider
- Jesper Jensen (footballer) (born 1988), Danish football midfielder
