= Ovesen =

Ovesen is a surname. Notable people with the surname include:

- Gene Ovesen (1928–2019), American curler
- Jesper Ovesen (born 1957), Danish businessman
- Nina Krebs Ovesen (born 1996), Danish cyclist
- Willy Ovesen (1924–2015), Norwegian civil servant
