= Fredric Anderberg =

Swedish ice hockey player

- Born: June 20, 1994 (age 31) Danderyd, Sweden
- Height: 5 ft 11 in (180 cm)
- Weight: 181 lb (82 kg; 12 st 13 lb)
- Position: Left wing
- Shot: Left
- SHL team: AIK IF
- NHL draft: Undrafted
- Playing career: 2013–2014

Fredric Anderberg (born June 20, 1994) is a retired Swedish ice hockey player. He was last time playing with AIK IF of the Swedish Hockey League (SHL).

Anderberg made his Swedish Hockey League debut playing with AIK IF during the 2013–14 SHL season, where he got a tackle that ended his caréer. He got tackled by Anton Hedman, coming from his blind spot, and went flying in the air and hit the ice hard. He got badly injured, and had to retire and end his caréer at the age of only 19.
