= Jesper Mattsson =

Jesper Mattsson may refer to:

- Jesper Mattsson (ice hockey) (born 1975), a Swedish ice hockey centre
- Jesper Mattsson (footballer) (born 1968), Swedish footballer

== See also ==
- Jesper Mattson (born 1995), a Swedish ice hockey defenceman
