= Anders Jochumsen =

Danish footballer and manager (born 1981)

Personal information
- Date of birth: 28 January 1981 (age 45)
- Place of birth: Brøndbyvester, Denmark
- Position: Striker

Team information
- Current team: Vallensbæk (youth development coach)

Youth career
- 1985–1999: Brøndby
- 2000: AB

Senior career*
Years	Team	Apps	(Gls)
2000–2001	AB		
2001–2003	Frem		
2003–2006	Herfølge		
2005	→ Køge (loan)		
2006	OB		
2006–2007	Lyngby	38	(24)
2007–2009	Fremad Amager	14	(12)
2009	Brønshøj		
2009	Vanløse		
2010	Avedøre		
2010	Stenløse		

International career
1995–1996	Denmark U16	4	(1)
1996–1997	Denmark U17	10	(1)
1998–2000	Denmark U19	9	(2)
2003	Denmark U21	2	(1)

Managerial career
- 2010–2011: Stenløse
- 2011: Greve
- 2011–2016: Brøndby (youth)
- 2016–2018: Frem (assistant)
- 2021–2022: Vigerslev BK
- 2022–2023: B 1903 (FCK reserves)
- 2023–2024: Fremad Valby
- 2025–: Vallensbæk (youth development coach)
- * Club domestic league appearances and goals

Anders Jochumsen (born 28 January 1981) is a Danish former professional footballer and manager. He is currently working as a youth development coach at Vallensbæk IF.

He has represented the Danish Under-21, Under-19, Under-17 and Under-16 national teams a total of 25 times scoring 5 goals.

== Career ==
Jochumsen started out as a trainee with Brøndby IF and has since represented several Danish clubs including Odense Boldklub and Akademisk Boldklub before moving to Lyngby Boldklub in the summer of 2006. He scored 16 league goals for Lyngby Boldklub in his first season with them.

On 7 August 2007 he got a free transfer from Lyngby BK, the day after he announced that he would continue his career in Fremad Amager in the Danish Second Division. He played for the club until March 2009. Later he played for Brønshøj BK, Vanløse IF, Avedøre IF and Stenløse BK.

In June 2010 he was named joint manager of Stenløse BK together with Thomas Skov. In June 2011 he replaced Anders Sundstrup as manager of Greve Fodbold.
