= Jesper Knudsen =

Jesper Knudsen may refer to:

- Jesper Knudsen (painter)
- Jesper Knudsen (badminton)
- Jesper Knudsen (speedway rider)
