= Martin Karlsson =

Martin Karlsson may refer to:

- Martin Karlsson (ice hockey, born 1952), Swedish ice hockey player and head coach
- Martin Karlsson (ice hockey, born 1991), Swedish ice hockey player
- Martin Karlsson (ice hockey, born 1996), Swedish ice hockey player
