= Ahle =

Ahle is a surname. Notable people with the surname include:

- Jesper Ahle (born 1981), Danish handball player
- Johann Rudolph Ahle (1625–1673), German composer
- Johann Georg Ahle (1651–1706), German composer

== See also ==
- Ahle (Schwülme), a river of Lower Saxony, Germany, tributary of the Schwülme
- Acute hemorrhagic leukoencephalitis, a neurological disorder
