= Taylor Matson =

American professional ice hockey player

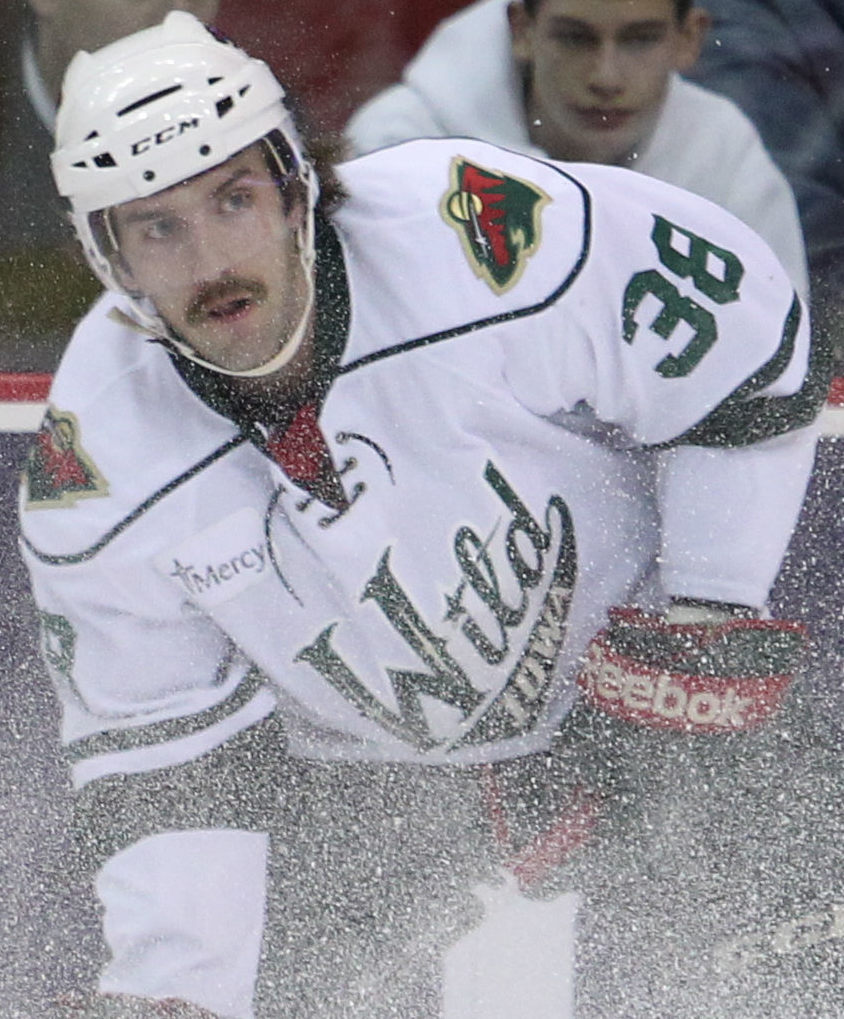
- Matson with the Iowa Wild in 2013
- Born: September 16, 1988 (age 38) Mound, Minnesota, U.S.
- Height: 5 ft 11 in (180 cm)
- Weight: 187 lb (85 kg; 13 st 5 lb)
- Position: Center/Right Wing
- Shot: Right
- Played for: Chicago Wolves; Iowa Wild; HV71; Rögle BK; Tappara
- NHL draft: 176th overall, 2007; Vancouver Canucks
- Playing career: 2012–2024

Taylor Matson (born September 16, 1988) is an American former professional ice hockey player. He was drafted 176th overall by Vancouver Canucks in the 2007 NHL entry draft. Prior to turning professional, Matson spent four years at the University of Minnesota and in the American Hockey League (AHL) and ECHL.

== Playing career ==
Matson was a two sport athlete at the Academy of Holy Angels, playing both tennis and ice hockey. In 2005, Matson led his schools hockey team to the 2005 Class AA state hockey championship. Although he was drafted 25th overall in the 2005 United States Hockey League (USHL) Draft by the Sioux Falls Stampede, Matson chose to complete high school before joining the USHL. In varsity tennis, he was named captain his junior and senior year and qualified for the State championship. At the conclusion of the 2006–07 season, Matson was named a finalist for the Minnesota Mr. Hockey award and named a second team all-state. After graduating, Matson joined the Des Moines Buccaneers in the USHL to conclude their 2006–07 season. While playing with the Buccaneers, Matson was drafted in the 6th round of the 2007 NHL entry draft by the Vancouver Canucks. That year, Matson signed a Letter of Intent to play NCAA Division 1 ice hockey for the University of Minnesota Golden Gophers in the 2008-09 season.

=== Collegiate ===
Matson began his freshman season with the Minnesota Golden Gophers while majoring in Kinesiology. His 2008–09 rookie season with the Gophers was cut short with a knee injury in a 6–3 loss to the Michigan Wolverines in December. He underwent surgery for his knee in December and was projected to miss the remainder of the season.

Matson returned for his sophomore season with Gophers healthy after missing 34 games the previous season. He recorded his first collegiate assist on Mike Hoeffel's goal in the season opener against North Dakota. However, he played a total of 19 games before suffering an ankle injury which cut his season short. He won the teams Most Determined Player award at the conclusion of the season and was named to the WCHA All-Academic team.

However, Matson bounced back for the 2010–2011 season and played in a career high 33 games as a junior. He recorded 10 goals and three assists and won the Mike Crupi Most Determined Player for the second time. His season was once again cut short due to an injury he suffered on March 4 against Bemidji State and Matson was forced to miss both the final game of the regular season and the post season games against Alaska Anchorage. He was also named to the WCHA All-Academic team again at the conclusion of the season.

In his senior year, Matson was named team captain. On March 24, 2012, Matson and the Golden Gophers qualified for the Frozen Four for the first time since 2005 after beating North Dakota. In the 5–2 win, Matson ended a 17-game goal scoring drought. However, the Golden Gophers would lose to the Boston College Eagles in the Frozen Four 6–1 on April 4.

=== Professional ===
On April 7, 2012, after graduating from the University of Minnesota, Matson signed an amateur tryout contract (ATO) with the Chicago Wolves of the American Hockey League (AHL). After recording two points in five games, Matson signed a professional contract with the team for the 2012–13 season. Matson made the Chicago Wolves opening night roster for the 2012–13 season.

Matson attended the Iowa Wild training camp prior to the 2013–14 season. On December 27, 2013, after playing in 26 games for the Iowa Wild, he was reassigned to the teams ECHL affiliate, the Orlando Solar Bears. Matson was named the ECHL Rookie of the Month of February after recording 19 points in 12 games. On March 1, 2014, Matson was recalled to the Iowa Wild after being honored as ECHL Player of the Week. He was reassigned to the ECHL on March 12, along with Colton Jobke.

He signed with Rögle BK of the HockeyAllsvenskan in Sweden on July 28, 2014 to compete in the 2014–15 season. In his first season with the team, Matson helped them qualify for the Swedish Hockey League, the top tier league in the country. He signed an extension with the team on April 12, 2017.

Prior to the 2018–19 season, Matson extended his contract with the team and was named an alternate captain alongside Jesper Williamsson and Ted Brithén.

Following his seventh season with Rögle BK, helping the club reach the Le Mat Trophy finals, Matson left as a free agent and signed with newly relegated Allsvenskan club, HV71, on June 2, 2021.

== Personal life ==
Matson was born on September 16, 1988, to parents Scott and Lisa Matson.

== Career statistics ==
			Regular season					Playoffs
Season	Team	League	GP	G	A	Pts	PIM	GP	G	A	Pts	PIM
2004–05	Academy of Holy Angels	HSMN
2005–06	Academy of Holy Angels	HSMN	27	28	40	68		—	—	—	—	—
2006–07	Academy of Holy Angels	HSMN	13			36		—	—	—	—	—
2006–07	Des Moines Buccaneers	USHL	10	1	2	3	6	6	0	1	1	10
2007–08	Des Moines Buccaneers	USHL	55	13	24	37	38	—	—	—	—	—
2008–09	University of Minnesota	WCHA	13	1	0	1	2	—	—	—	—	—
2009–10	University of Minnesota	WCHA	19	2	3	5	6	—	—	—	—	—
2010–11	University of Minnesota	WCHA	33	10	3	13	16	—	—	—	—	—
2011–12	University of Minnesota	WCHA	43	8	15	23	28	—	—	—	—	—
2011–12	Chicago Wolves	AHL	5	1	1	2	4	5	0	1	1	4
2012–13	Chicago Wolves	AHL	2	0	0	0	0	—	—	—	—	–
2013–14	Iowa Wild	AHL	33	3	2	5	12	—	—	—	–	–
2013–14	Orlando Solar Bears	ECHL	39	18	24	42	27	6	2	2	3	4
2014–15	Rögle BK	Allsv	52	13	24	37	34	10	1	4	5	6
2015–16	Rögle BK	SHL	52	3	17	20	28	—	—	—	—	—
2016–17	Rögle BK	SHL	31	1	2	3	10	—	—	—	—	—
2017–18	Rögle BK	SHL	40	8	4	12	12	—	—	—	—	—
2018–19	Rögle BK	SHL	52	8	12	20	36	2	0	0	0	2
2019–20	Rögle BK	SHL	52	9	7	16	16	—	—	—	—	—
2020–21	Rögle BK	SHL	50	3	6	9	18	14	2	2	4	4
2021–22	HV71	Allsv	42	11	11	22	45	15	5	7	12	4
2022–23	HV71	SHL	51	4	8	12	43	—	—	—	—	—
2023–24	Graz 99ers	ICEHL	35	7	14	21	10	—	—	—	—	—
2023–24	Tappara	Liiga	14	4	3	7	2	2	0	0	0	0
SHL totals			328	36	56	92	163	16	2	2	4	6

== Awards and honors ==
Award	Year	Ref
College
NCAA (WCHA) All-Academic Team	2010, 2011, 2012	
ECHL
Rookie of the Month (February)	2014	
ECHL Player of the Week	2014	
