= Jesper Jørgensen (footballer, born 1983) =

Danish footballer (born 1983)

Personal information
- Date of birth: 10 March 1983 (age 43)
- Place of birth: Copenhagen, Denmark
- Position: Striker

Youth career
- Lyngby

Senior career*
Years	Team	Apps	(Gls)
2004–2005	Frem		
2006	AGF	2	(0)
2007–2008	Kolding FC		
2008	Galway United	11	(1)
2009	Greve		
2010–2011	Kolding FC		
2011–2014	Kolding BK		
- * Club domestic league appearances and goals

Jesper Jørgensen (born 10 March 1983) is a Danish former footballer who played as a striker.

== Career ==
Jorgensen started his senior career with Boldklubben Frem in 2004. In 2005, he signed for AGF in the Danish Superliga where he made eight appearances and scored zero goals. After that, he played for Danish club Kolding FC, before being signed by Irish club Galway United. He later played for Danish clubs Greve Fodbold and Kolding Boldklub before retiring.
