= Michael Madsen (footballer) =

Danish footballer and manager (born 1974)

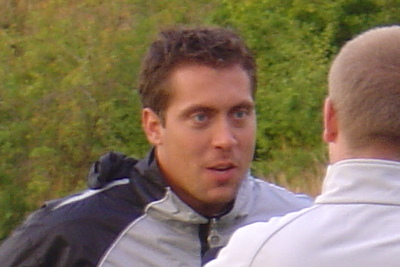

Personal information
- Full name: Michael Madsen
- Date of birth: 24 January 1974 (age 52)
- Place of birth: Frederiksberg, Denmark
- Height: 1.92 m (6 ft 3 1/2 in)
- Position: Left-back

Team information
- Current team: Skovshoved (Manager)

Senior career*
Years	Team	Apps	(Gls)
1992–1996	Avarta	66	
1996–1998	Akademisk	46	(6)
1998–2001	Bari	45	(1)
2001–2002	VfL Wolfsburg	8	(0)
2002–2003	Farum	24	(0)
2003–2005	HIK		
2005–2007	Lyngby	13	(3)

Managerial career
- 2007: HIK
- 2008: Fremad Amager (caretaker)
- 2008–2009: Amager
- 2009–2011: Vanløse
- 2012: Brønshøj (assistant)
- 2013–2015: Greve
- 2015–2017: Greve (director of sports)
- 2017: Greve
- 2018–2019: AB
- 2019–2020: Brønshøj Boldklub
- 2021–2022: Skovshoved (assistant)
- 2022–: Skovshoved
- * Club domestic league appearances and goals

Michael Madsen (born 24 January 1974) is a Danish retired footballer who most prominently played professionally for Italian club AS Bari and VfL Wolfsburg in Germany. He was most recently the manager of Brønshøj Boldklub.

== Biography ==
Madsen started his career at BK Avarta in the secondary Danish 1st Division league, where he won the 1994 Danish 1st Division Revelation of the Year award. He was introduced to the top-flight Danish Superliga championship, when he was brought to newly promoted club Akademisk Boldklub (AB) in June 1996. Under manager Christian Andersen, AB finished fifth in the 1997–98 Superliga season, with Madsen on the left flank, combining well with teammate Peter Knudsen in central midfield.

In June 1998, Madsen and Peter Knudsen were both brought to Italian club AS Bari in a combined transfer deal worth DKK 15 million. When they were forced to compete for the same spot in the Bari starting line-up, Peter Knudsen quickly returned to AB, while Madsen stayed three years at Bari. He started out well for the club, but was eventually benched by manager Eugenio Fascetti. Bari was relegated after the 2001 season, and as his Bari contract ran out in June 2001, Madsen left the club.

He moved to German club VfL Wolfsburg on a free transfer. In the opening weeks of the German Bundesliga championship season, Madsen suffered a back injury, and struggled the remaining season to re-enter the starting line-up under manager Wolfgang Wolf without success. Following three league games for Wolfsburg, Madsen moved back to Denmark to play for Superliga club Farum BK under his former AB manager Christian Andersen in September 2002. Following one season at Farum, Madsen did not get his contract prolonged, and decided to take a job in the sales department of SAV Danmark in July 2003.

=== Later career ===
After a month away from football, he started playing for amateur club HIK in the Danish 2nd Division in August 2003. He helped the club win promotion for the 1st Division, which saw the club turn professional, before he moved to league rivals Lyngby BK in November 2005. Due to an injured knee, he was forced to end his career in February 2007. Shortly after the news of his career stop, it was announced that he was to be associated with the newly founded Birkerød Sports College as a football coach, beginning in the summer of 2007. However, he chose to be new head coach at HIK. He only kept this job for a few months, because in June 2007 he was announced new sporting director at BK Fremad Amager. When his new club fired Jakob Friis-Hansen in May 2008 he became caretaker manager.

After the season, he became manager of FC Amager. He had the job at Amager until March 2009, when the club went bankrupt. In June 2009 he was named the new manager of Vanløse IF.

On 6 October 2011, he announced that he would not renew his contract with Vanløse, when it ended on 31 December 2011. In January 2012 he became assistant manager of Brønshøj Boldklub.

He succeeded Erik Rasmussen as manager of Greve Fodbold on 1 January 2013.

In January 2018 he became new manager of Akademisk Boldklub. He left in May 2019 to become manager of AB's local rivals Brønshøj Boldklub. Following a poor start to the 2020-21-season he left Brønshøj in October 2020.

In January 2021, Madsen was hired as assistant coach at Skovshoved IF. On 2 August 2022, he was appointed manager of the club.
