= Jesper Bärgård =

Swedish ice hockey player

- Born: April 28, 1993 (age 32) Enköping, Sweden
- Height: 6 ft 3 in (191 cm)
- Weight: 209 lb (95 kg; 14 st 13 lb)
- Position: Right wing
- Shoots: Left
- Hockeyettan team Former teams: Vimmerby HC; Linköpings HC
- NHL draft: Undrafted
- Playing career: 2013–present

Jesper Bärgård (born April 28, 1993) is a Swedish ice hockey player. He is currently playing for Vimmerby HC of the Hockeyettan.

Bärgård played two games in the Elitserien with Linköpings HC during the 2012–13 Elitserien season.
