= Jesper Nygart =

Danish doctor

Jesper Nygart (born June 13, 1956) is a specialist doctor at Nygart Private Hospital. Jesper Nygart has a medical degree as a doctor from University of Copenhagen and introduced botox for cosmetic surgery in Denmark and a technique for facial rejuvenation with barbed wire. He is used by Danish media as a commentator on cosmetic surgery issues, mainly breast enlargement and botox-treatment. In 2009 the Danish National Agency for Patients' Rights and Complaints stated that "specialist doctor Jesper Nygart acted substandard for generally recognized professional procedure" due to irregularities in Nygarts journals.

In 2016, Jesper Nygart sold Nygart to the Swedish plastic surgery chain Akademiklinikken. Therefore, Nygart has changed its name to AK Nygart.
