= Greve Fodbold =

Danish football club

Greve
- Full name: Greve Fodbold
- Nickname: Den Blå Bølge
- Founded: 1935 (as Greve IF)
- Ground: Greve Idræts Center, Greve
- Capacity: 7,000
- Chairman: Carsten Rasmussen
- Manager: Anton Moestrup Rasmussen
- League: Denmark Series (V)
- 2021–22: Denmark Series – Group 1, 3rd of 10
Home colours	Away colours

Greve Fodbold is a Danish football club currently playing in the Denmark Series, the fifth tier of Danish football. The club have played the entirety of their existence in the lower divisions and spent one season in the second tier in 1980. They play at Greve Idræts Center in Greve on Zealand, which has a capacity of 7,000. The ground will receive a 13 million kroner renovation in 2021.

To the 2025–26 season Greve IF and Karlslunde IF merged their respectively top-tier teams to form FC Sydkysten.

== Notable managers ==
- Sten Ziegler
- Karsten Aabrink
- Jan Kalborg
- Morten Eskesen (2006–2009)
- Jesper Hansen (2010)
- Anders Sundstrup (2010–2011)
- Anders Jochumsen (2011)
- Jesper Falck (2011)
- Finn M. Jensen (2012)
- Benny Nielsen (2012)
- Erik Rasmussen (2012)
- Michael Madsen (2013–2015)
- Jonas Borup Jensen (2015–2016)
- Henrik Gundersen (2017)
- Michael Madsen (2017)
- Claus Larsen (2018)
- Dennis Hald Olsen (2019–2021)
- Anton Moestrup Rasmussen (2021–present)
