= Anders Sundstrup =

Danish footballer (born 1961)

Personal information
- Full name: Anders Peter Sundstrup
- Date of birth: 17 June 1961 (age 65)
- Place of birth: Copenhagen, Denmark
- Position: Striker

Team information
- Current team: BK Frem (Reserve manager)

Youth career
- Boldklubben Frem

Senior career*
Years	Team	Apps	(Gls)
1978–1980	Boldklubben Frem		
1981–1982	Brøndby IF		
1982–1985	AZ Alkmaar		
1985	Telstar		
1985–1986	Brøndby IF		
1986–1987	FC Sochaux-Montbéliard	17	(2)
1988–1990	Aalborg BK	90	(18)
1990–1992	Boldklubben Frem		
1992–1994	Køge Boldklub	43	(23)

International career
1977	Denmark U-17	3	(0)

Managerial career
- 2000–2001: Skælskør B&I
- 2002: FK Prespa
- 2010–2011: Greve Fodbold
- 2012–XXXX: BK Frem U19
- XXXX–: BK Frem (reserves)
- * Club domestic league appearances and goals

Anders Peter Sundstrup (born 17 July 1961, in Copenhagen) is a Danish former football player and now manager of the reserve team of BK Frem. He has also managed Greve Fodbold. Besides Denmark, Sundstrup has played in the Netherlands and France.
