= Niklas Arell =

Swedish ice hockey player

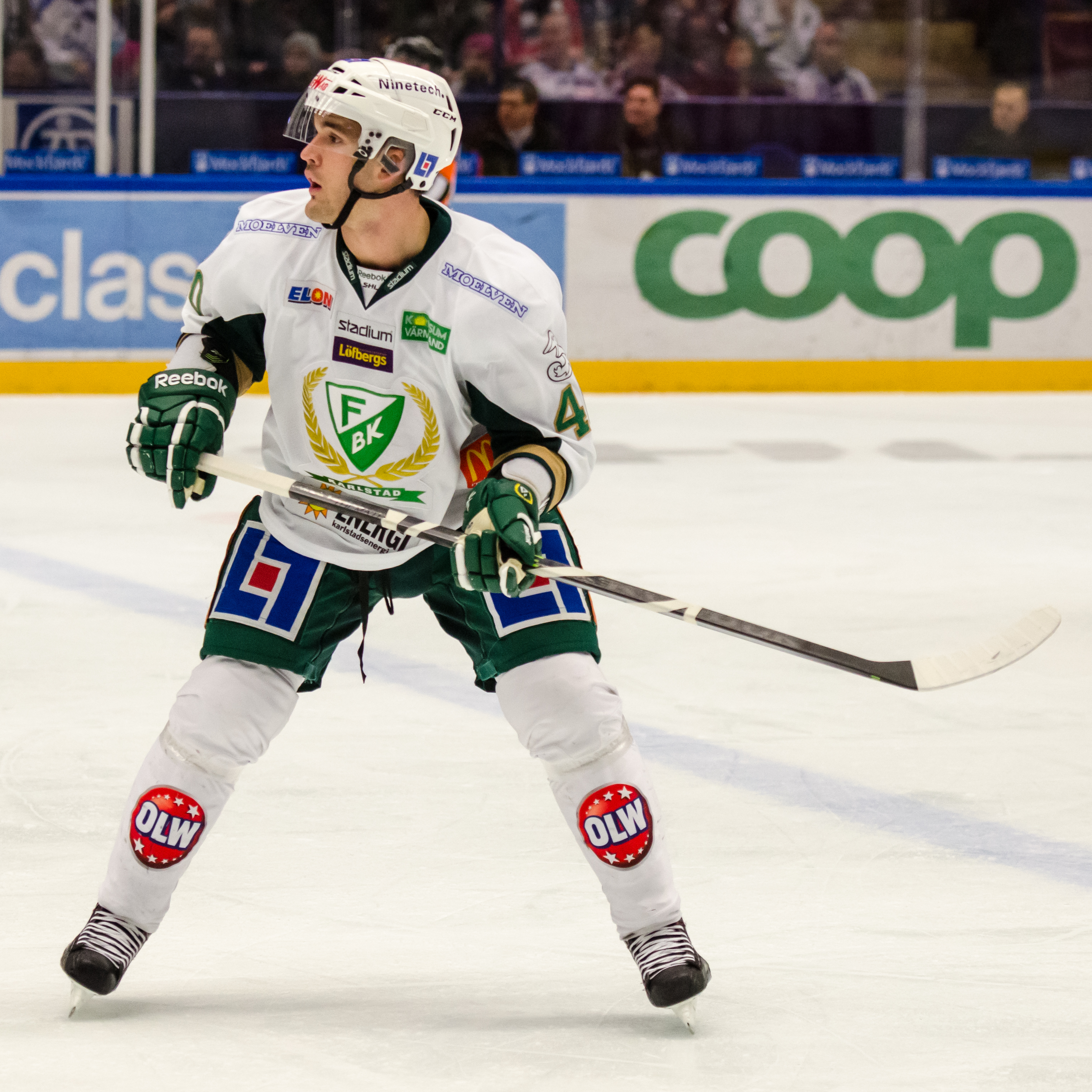
- Born: October 29, 1990 (age 34) Ekerö, Sweden
- Height: 6 ft 2 in (188 cm)
- Weight: 225 lb (102 kg; 16 st 1 lb)
- Position: Defence
- Shoots: Left
- Liiga team Former teams: HC TPS; Rosenborg IHK; Färjestad BK; Karlskrona HK; Malmö Redhawks; HV71
- Playing career: 2009–present

Niklas Arell (born October 29, 1990) is a Swedish professional ice hockey defenceman. He is currently playing with HC TPS of the Liiga (Finland).

Arell made his Swedish Hockey League debut playing with Färjestad BK during the 2013–14 SHL season.
