= Jasper Wilson (politician) =

American politician and baptist minister (1819–1896)

Jasper Wilson (October 30, 1819 – June 12, 1896), was a Baptist preacher and a representative from Bulloch County in the Georgia Legislature from 1881–1885.

Jasper was married to Mary Lee and they had seven children. Jasper was a circuit rider and preached in various churches, often walking on foot to some of them. Jasper owned a large plantation near Statesboro, Georgia, and many enslaved people. During the Civil War, General Sherman's army went through his plantation.
