= Jasper van den Bos =

Dutch painter

Jasper van den Bos (1634, Hoorn – in or shortly after 1656, Hoorn) was a Dutch Golden Age marine painter.

According to Houbraken his father was a ship's carpenter and he was trained as such, but turned his hand to painting marines, which he was very good at. He died young, but left quite a collection of drawings that could be admired in Hoorn at the home of the painter Johannes van Bronckhorst and elsewhere.

According to the RKD he painted seascapes and harbor scenes, but also made Italianate landscapes in albums.
