= Jesper Andersen =

Danish footballer (born 1979)

Personal information
- Date of birth: 31 May 1979 (age 47)
- Place of birth: Odense, Denmark
- Position: Defender

Senior career*
Years	Team	Apps	(Gls)
1996–2000	OB	9	(1)
2000–2003	AGF	61	(1)
2003–2009	Viborg FF	97	(1)
2009–2011	FC Hjørring	0	(0)

International career
1996–1998	Denmark U-19	8	(0)
1998	Denmark U-20	2	(0)
1999–2001	Denmark U-21	3	(0)
- * Club domestic league appearances and goals

Jesper Andersen (born 31 May 1979) is a Danish retired professional football (soccer) player, who played as a defender.

He is best known for his many appearances in the Danish Superliga playing for OB, AGF and Viborg FF. All in all he appeared in 167 matches in the Danish Superliga

Late in his career he was troubled by a knee injury, which led to a career-stop in the fall of 2008. Though he later reappeared in the Viborg FF squad for half a season, but had to leave the club in June 2009, after he had been struck by yet another injury.
