= Jesper Williamsson =

Swedish ice hockey player

- Born: April 23, 1990 (age 36) Nässjö, Sweden
- Height: 6 ft 2 in (188 cm)
- Weight: 194 lb (88 kg; 13 st 12 lb)
- Position: Defence
- Shot: Left
- Played for: HV71; Rögle BK
- Playing career: 2009–2021

Jesper Williamsson (born April 23, 1990) is a Swedish former professional ice hockey defenceman who played with HV71 and Rögle BK in the Swedish Hockey League (SHL).

== Playing career ==
Williamsson made his Elitserien debut playing with HV71 during the 2008–09 Elitserien season. He left HV71 in 2015 and joined Rögle BK.

On August 2, 2017, Williamsson signed a one-year extension with Rögle BK. Prior to the 2018–19 season, Williamsson was named an alternate captain alongside Taylor Matson and Ted Brithén.

On April 25, 2019, Williamsson returned to HV71 signing a one-year contract for the 2019–20 season. On 30 July 2021, Williamsson announced his retirement from professional hockey after 13 seasons due to a chronic back injury.

== Personal life ==
His brother Jens also plays hockey.

== Career statistics ==
			Regular season					Playoffs
Season	Team	League	GP	G	A	Pts	PIM	GP	G	A	Pts	PIM
2006–07	Nässjö HC	Division 2	1	0	0	0	0	—	—	—	—	—
2006–07	Alvesta SK	Division 2	—	0	0	0	—	—	—	—	—	—
2007–08	Nässjö HC J18	J18 Div.1	3	0	0	0	0	—	—	—	—	—
2007–08	Nässjö HC J20	J20 Div.1	14	3	8	11	6	—	—	—	—	—
2007–08	Nässjö HC	Division 2	26	5	1	6	45	—	—	—	—	—
2008–09	HV71 J20	J20 SuperElit	40	3	3	6	69	7	1	1	2	0
2008–09	HV71	Elitserien	1	0	0	0	0	—	—	—	—	—
2008–09	Nässjö HC	Division 2	2	0	2	2	0	—	—	—	—	—
2009–10	HV71 J20	J20 SuperElit	33	11	7	18	46	3	0	1	1	4
2009–10	HV71	Elitserien	13	0	0	0	6	—	—	—	—	—
2009–10	IK Oskarshamn	HockeyAllsvenskan	6	0	0	0	2	—	—	—	—	—
2010–11	IF Troja-Ljungby	HockeyAllsvenskan	45	1	5	6	38	—	—	—	—	—
2011–12	HV71	Elitserien	1	0	0	0	0	—	—	—	—	—
2011–12	IF Troja-Ljungby	HockeyAllsvenskan	47	11	10	21	48	—	—	—	—	—
2012–13	HV71	Elitserien	29	1	1	2	8	—	—	—	—	—
2012–13	IF Troja-Ljungby	HockeyAllsvenskan	8	0	2	2	2	—	—	—	—	—
2013–14	HV71	SHL	52	1	0	1	16	—	—	—	—	—
2014–15	HV71	SHL	40	0	4	4	16	1	0	0	0	0
2014–15	Malmö Redhawks	HockeyAllsvenskan	4	0	0	0	4	—	—	—	—	—
2015–16	Rögle BK	SHL	44	0	5	5	20	—	—	—	—	—
2016–17	Rögle BK	SHL	39	1	4	5	14	—	—	—	—	—
2017–18	Rögle BK	SHL	22	3	3	6	18	—	—	—	—	—
2018–19	Rögle BK	SHL	47	1	0	1	16	1	0	0	0	0
2019–20	HV71	SHL	44	3	5	8	20	—	—	—	—	—
2020–21	HV71	SHL	—	—	—	—	—	—	—	—	—	—
SHL/Elitserien totals			332	10	22	32	134	2	0	0	0	0
HockeyAllsvenskan totals			110	12	17	29	94	—	—	—	—	—
