= Jesper Falck =

Danish football manager and former player (born 1970)

Personal information
- Full name: Jesper Falck
- Date of birth: 4 December 1970 (age 55)
- Place of birth: Copenhagen, Denmark
- Height: 1.84 m (6 ft 0 in)
- Position: Midfielder

Senior career*
Years	Team	Apps	(Gls)
1992–1993	Roskilde		
1994	Lyngby		
1994–1999	AB		
1999–2000	Herfølge		
2000–2002	AB		
2002	Bregenz		
2002–2004	AB		
2004–2005	FC Roskilde		
2005–?	B.93		

Managerial career
- 2004–2005: FC Roskilde (player assistant)
- 2011: Greve Fodbold
- 2013–: RB1906 (FCR reserves)
- * Club domestic league appearances and goals as of 5 November 2012 (UTC)

Jesper Falck (born 4 December 1970) is a Danish retired professional football player and current manager of RB1906, the reserves team of FC Roskilde. Born in Copenhagen, Denmark, he played as a midfielder for a number of Danish clubs, as well as Austrian club SC Bregenz. In Denmark, Falck played for FC Roskilde, Lyngby FC, Akademisk Boldklub (AB), Herfølge BK, and B.93, winning the 1999 Danish Cup with AB. From 1994 to 2004, Falck played a combined 226 games and scored 35 goals in the Danish Superliga championship for Lyngby, AB, and Herfølge.

Falck was part of the Herfølge squad that won the 1999–2000 Danish Superliga.

== Honours ==
Akademisk Boldklub

- Danish Cup: 1998–99

Herfølge

Danish Superliga: 1999–2000
