= Jesper Bengtsson =

Swedish footballer

Personal information
- Date of birth: 2 September 1971
- Height: 1.87 m (6 ft 2 in)
- Position: Midfielder

Senior career*
Years	Team	Apps	(Gls)
1989–1997	Falkenbergs FF		
1998–2002	IF Elfsborg		

Managerial career
- 2011–2013: IF Elfsborg (assistant)
- 2015–2016: IF Elfsborg (youth)
- * Club domestic league appearances and goals

Jesper Bengtsson (born 2 September 1971) is a Swedish retired football midfielder. (Note: Jesper Bengtsson at WorldFootball.net)
