= Luciano Aquino =

Canadian-born Italian ice hockey player

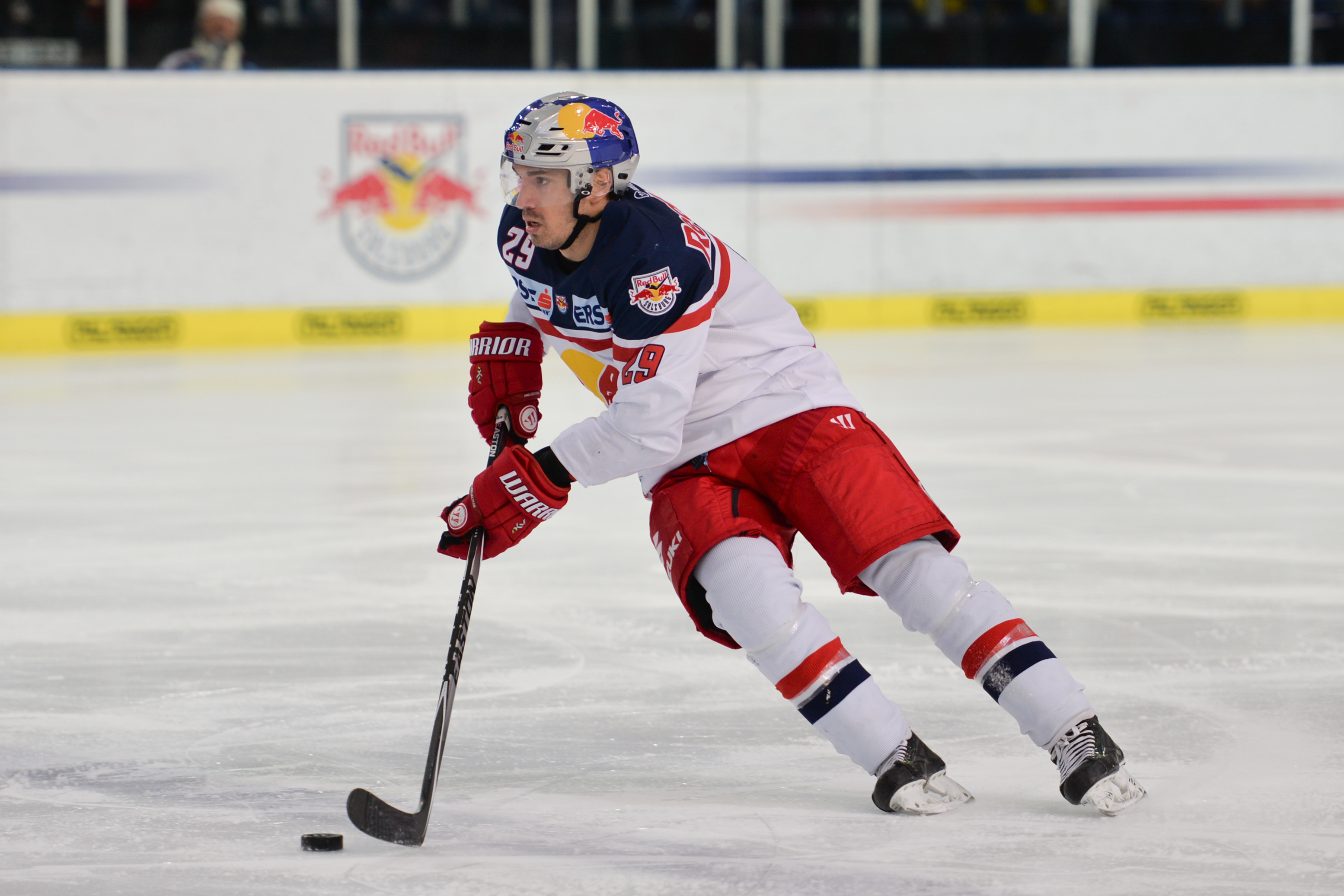
- Born: January 26, 1985 (age 41) Mississauga, Ontario, Canada
- Height: 5 ft 10 in (178 cm)
- Weight: 201 lb (91 kg; 14 st 5 lb)
- Position: Right wing
- Shot: Left
- Played for: Bridgeport Sound Tigers; HC Asiago; HC Valpellice; ERC Ingolstadt; Dornbirner EC; Färjestad BK; EC Red Bull Salzburg
- National team: Italy
- NHL draft: 210th overall, 2005; New York Islanders
- Playing career: 2006–2016

Luciano Aquino (born January 26, 1985) is a Canadian-born Italian professional ice hockey player. He is currently an unrestricted free agent who most recently played with EC Red Bull Salzburg of the Austrian Hockey League (EBEL). Aquino was selected by the New York Islanders in the 7th round (210th overall) of the 2005 NHL entry draft.

== Playing career ==
Aquino played major junior hockey in the Ontario Hockey League with the Brampton Battalion where, from 2004-05 to 2005-06, he played 97 games collecting 53 goals and 90 assists for 143 points.

In his second season with Dornbirner EC of the Austrian Hockey League in 2013–14, Aquino led the club and the EBEL in scoring with 49 assists and 79 points in 53 games. Having excelled in the EBEL, Aquino secured a move to the SHL on a one-year contract with Färjestad BK on May 2, 2014.

== Career statistics ==
			Regular season					Playoffs
Season	Team	League	GP	G	A	Pts	PIM	GP	G	A	Pts	PIM
2000–01	St. Michael's Buzzers	OPJHL	6	0	3	3	0	—	—	—	—	—
2001–02	Wexford Raiders	OPJHL	46	21	26	47	49	—	—	—	—	—
2002–03	Wexford Raiders	OPJHL	48	48	54	102	73	—	—	—	—	—
2003–04	University of Maine	HE	20	4	5	9	8	—	—	—	—	—
2004–05	Brampton Battalion	OHL	65	25	46	71	80	6	5	4	9	9
2005–06	Bridgeport Sound Tigers	AHL	9	0	2	2	6	—	—	—	—	—
2005–06	Trenton Titans	ECHL	3	0	1	1	0	—	—	—	—	—
2005–06	Brampton Battalion	OHL	32	28	44	72	32	11	8	13	21	23
2007–08	Bridgeport Sound Tigers	AHL	13	2	1	3	6	—	—	—	—	—
2006–07	Pensacola Ice Pilots	ECHL	2	0	1	1	8	—	—	—	—	—
2006–07	Utah Grizzlies	ECHL	31	8	20	28	38	—	—	—	—	—
2007–08	Fort Wayne Komets	IHL	74	41	50	91	114	13	6	7	13	18
2008–09	Reading Royals	ECHL	5	1	3	4	2	—	—	—	—	—
2008–09	Asiago Hockey 1935	ITA	22	22	12	34	44	3	0	4	4	8
2009–10	HC Valpellice	ITA	36	27	46	73	63	5	1	4	5	12
2010–11	HC Valpellice	ITA	37	26	45	71	74	9	4	10	14	12
2011–12	ERC Ingolstadt	DEL	36	10	13	23	18	7	0	1	1	2
2012–13	Dornbirner EC	AUT	52	17	54	71	59	—	—	—	—	—
2013–14	Dornbirner EC	AUT	53	30	49	79	37	6	2	5	7	24
2014–15	Färjestad BK	SHL	24	3	8	11	4	—	—	—	—	—
2014–15	Dornbirner EC	AUT	26	10	17	27	12	—	—	—	—	—
2015–16	EC Red Bull Salzburg	AUT	28	15	21	36	19	8	1	5	6	4
ITA totals			95	75	103	178	181	17	5	18	23	32
AUT totals			159	72	141	213	127	14	3	10	13	28

== Awards and honours ==
Award	Year
Gary F. Longman Memorial Trophy - IHL Rookie of the Year	2007–08
