= Nicholas Saunders =

Nicholas or Nick Saunders may refer to:

== Politics ==
- Nicholas Saunders (died 1587), MP for Bletchingley
- Nicholas Saunders (died 1605), MP for Penryn, St Ives, Lostwithiel and Helston
- Nicholas Saunders (died 1649), MP for Haslemere, Gatton and Winchelsea

== Sports ==
- Clarence Saunders (athlete) or Nick Saunders (born 1963), Bermudian high jumper
- Nick Saunders (boxer), United States national amateur boxing bantamweight champion of 1944

== Others ==
- Nicholas Saunders (activist) (1938–1998), British entrepreneur of the alternative culture and, later, MDMA (Ecstasy) advocate
- Nicholas Saunders (actor) (1913–2006), Ukrainian–American actor, theatre translator and stage manager
- Nicholas Saunders (vice-chancellor) (born 1946), Australian academic and Vice-Chancellor of the University of Newcastle, Australia
- Nicholas J. Saunders (born 1953), British academic archaeologist and anthropologist

== See also ==
- Nicholas Sanders (c. 1530–1581), English Roman Catholic priest and polemicist
