= Jesper Storm =

Danish handball player (born 1982)

Personal information
- Full name: Jesper Storm
- Nationality: Danish Denmark
- Born: 23 July 1982 (age 44)
- Height: 198 cm (78 in)

Sport
- Sport: Handball
- Position: Line player
- Current club: Retired

Jesper Storm (born 23 July 1982) is a Danish former handballer. His last club was Danish Handball League side Aarhus GF. He joined the club in 2002.

He has previously played for league rivals KIF Kolding. He ended his career in 2009 due to back injuries at the age of only 26.
