= Niklas Sjökvist =

Swedish ice hockey player

- Born: July 20, 1970 (age 56) Karlskoga, Sweden
- Height: 5 ft 10 in (178 cm)
- Weight: 194 lb (88 kg; 13 st 12 lb)
- Position: Center
- Shot: Left
- Played for: Bofors IK; Örebro IK; IF Troja-Ljungby; Färjestad BK
- Playing career: 1986–2000

Niklas Sjökvist (born July 20, 1970) is a Swedish former ice hockey player. He is the father of proplayer Tobias Sjökvist.

== Career ==
In 1986 Sjökvist made his debut for Bofors IK for which he played in Division 1 and Division 2. He played for Örebro IK and IF Troja-Ljungby in Division 1. In 1996 he started playing for Färjestad BK in the Elitserien, he won two Swedish titles with them. In his first season in the Elitserien he became Rookie of the Year. He stopped playing in 2000 after an injury. In 2002-2003 he was an assistant-coach at Färjestad BK.

== Career statistics ==
=== Regular season and playoffs ===
			Regular season					Playoffs
Season	Team	League	GP	G	A	Pts	PIM	GP	G	A	Pts	PIM
1986–87	Bofors IK	Division 1	4	0	0	0	0	—	—	—	—	—
1987–88	Bofors IK	Division 1	28	10	7	17	10	—	—	—	—	—
1988–89	Bofors IK	Division 1	30	21	16	37	16	—	—	—	—	—
1989–90	Bofors IK	Division 1	24	13	9	22	16	—	—	—	—	—
1990–91	Bofors IK	Division 2	29	25	22	47	38	—	—	—	—	—
1991–92	Bofors IK	Division 1	32	22	20	42	32	—	—	—	—	—
1992–93	Örebro IK	Division 1	35	19	20	39	16	—	—	—	—	—
1993–94	Örebro IK	Division 1	33	14	15	29	24	—	—	—	—	—
1994–95	Örebro IK	Division 1	35	18	23	41	14	—	—	—	—	—
1995–96	IF Troja-Ljungby	Division 1	36	11	14	25	18	—	—	—	—	—
1996–97	Färjestad BK	Elitserien	42	11	13	24	15	14	3	5	8	6
1997–98	Färjestad BK	Elitserien	45	7	20	27	16	12	2	0	2	2
1998–99	Färjestad BK	Elitserien	31	10	12	22	12	1	0	2	2	0
1999–00	Färjestad BK	Elitserien	48	11	17	28	33	7	1	1	2	4
Elitserien totals			166	39	62	101	76	34	6	8	14	12
Division 1 totals			257	128	124	252	146	—	—	—	—	—
Division 2 totals			29	25	22	47	38	—	—	—	—	—
