= Jesper Hansen (football manager) =

Danish football manager and former player (born 1963)

Personal information
- Full name: Jesper Hansen
- Date of birth: December 24, 1963 (age 62)
- Place of birth: Denmark
- Position: Goalkeeper

Managerial career
- Years: Team
- 1998–2000: Brønshøj Boldklub
- 2000–2001: Virum-Sorgenfri Boldklub
- 2002–2003: Brønshøj Boldklub (reserves)
- 2003–2005: Holbæk B&I
- 2006: Herfølge Boldklub
- 2007: FC Roskilde (goalkeepers)
- 2007–2008: Hellerup IK
- 2008: Lolland-Falster Alliancen
- 2009: Nordvest FC (reserves)
- 2010: Greve Fodbold
- 2011–2015: Brønshøj Boldklub (youth)
- 2015–2017: Brønshøj Boldklub

Jesper Hansen (born 24 December 1963) is a Danish former football player (goalkeeper) and now manager.

As player he played for Holbæk B&I, Jyderup Boldklub, Brøndby IF and Brønshøj Boldklub. He played a total 40 games for Brøndby in all competitions. Hansen played one game for the Denmark national under-21 football team in November 1983.

He has formerly managed Brønshøj Boldklub, Holbæk B&I, Herfølge Boldklub, Hellerup IK, Lolland-Falster Alliancen. and Greve Fodbold
