= Tero Koskiranta =

Finnish ice hockey player

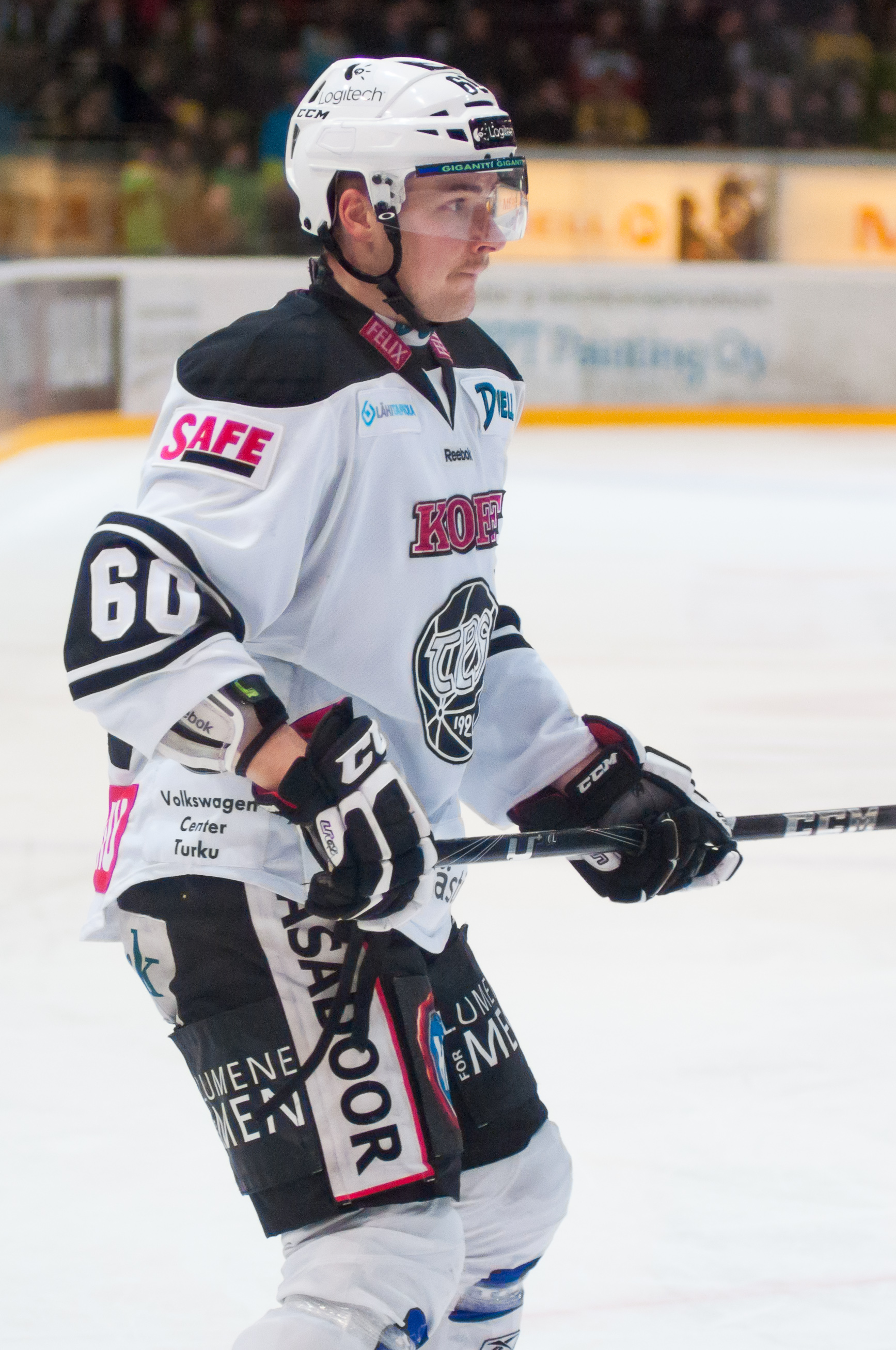
- Born: June 18, 1984 (age 40); Paimio, Finland
- Height: 6 ft 1 in (185 cm)
- Weight: 185 lb (84 kg; 13 st 3 lb)
- Position: Forward
- Shoots: Left
- DEL2 team Former teams: Ravensburg Towerstars; Pelicans, HC TPS
- NHL draft: Undrafted
- Playing career: 2006–present

Tero Koskiranta (born June 18, 1984) is a Finnish ice hockey player who currently plays professionally in Germany for Ravensburg Towerstars of the DEL2.

== Career statistics ==
			Regular season					Playoffs
Season	Team	League	GP	G	A	Pts	PIM	GP	G	A	Pts	PIM
1999–00	Espoo Blues U16	U16 SM-sarja	14	2	7	9	10	6	0	2	2	0
2000–01	Espoo Blues U18 II	U18 I-Divisioona	14	9	8	17	16	—	—	—	—	—
2001–02	Espoo Blues U18 II	U18 I-Divisioona	13	12	11	23	12	7	5	9	14	4
2001–02	Espoo Blues U18	U18 SM-sarja	11	1	2	3	6	—	—	—	—	—
2002–03	Espoo Blues U20	U20 SM-liiga	35	4	3	7	6	8	0	1	1	0
2003–04	Espoo Blues U20	U20 SM-liiga	39	12	11	23	57	5	0	2	2	2
2004–05	Espoo Blues U20	U20 SM-liiga	36	11	13	24	28	7	3	2	5	2
2005–06	HC Salamat	Mestis	41	5	6	11	46	5	0	1	1	4
2006–07	Espoo Blues	SM-liiga	36	0	2	2	8	—	—	—	—	—
2006–07	HC Salamat	Mestis	11	4	3	7	20	—	—	—	—	—
2007–08	Espoo Blues	SM-liiga	35	2	3	5	22	9	0	0	0	4
2007–08	HC Salamat	Mestis	15	5	3	8	49	—	—	—	—	—
2008–09	SaiPa	SM-liiga	55	18	22	40	54	—	—	—	—	—
2009–10	SaiPa	SM-liiga	32	2	5	7	8	—	—	—	—	—
2009–10	Mikkelin Jukurit	Mestis	1	0	0	0	2	—	—	—	—	—
2010–11	SaiPa	SM-liiga	45	7	14	21	26	—	—	—	—	—
2011–12	Lahti Pelicans	SM-liiga	59	10	32	42	30	17	5	9	14	10
2012–13	HC TPS	SM-liiga	60	12	21	33	86	—	—	—	—	—
2013–14	HC TPS	Liiga	59	10	16	26	83	—	—	—	—	—
2014–15	HC TPS	Liiga	40	9	15	24	46	—	—	—	—	—
2014–15	Färjestad BK	SHL	13	1	4	5	4	3	1	1	2	0
2015–16	HC TPS	Liiga	17	3	3	6	4	—	—	—	—	—
2015–16	Vaasan Sport	Liiga	40	8	13	21	58	2	1	0	1	0
2016–17	SaiPa	Liiga	56	16	14	30	34	—	—	—	—	—
2017–18	Medvescak Zagreb	EBEL	54	14	29	43	36	6	2	1	3	2
2018–19	Fehérvár AV19	EBEL	53	10	34	44	26	6	2	0	2	6
2019–20	Ravensburg Towerstars	DEL2	32	14	15	29	22	—	—	—	—	—
2020–21	Gyergyói HK	Erste Liga	30	15	12	27	24	5	1	5	6	—
2020–21	Gyergyói HK	Romania	8	5	0	5	10	—	—	—	—	—
SM-liiga totals			534	97	160	257	459	28	6	9	15	14
Mestis totals			68	14	12	26	117	5	0	1	1	4
EBEL totals			107	24	63	87	62	12	4	1	5	8
