= Jesper Ylivainio =

Swedish ice hockey player

- Born: February 7, 1997 (age 28); Övertorneå, Sweden
- Height: 5 ft 8 in (173 cm)
- Weight: 161 lb (73 kg; 11 st 7 lb)
- Position: Forward
- Shoots: Right
- Div.1 team Former teams: Piteå HC; Luleå HF; Narvik Hockey
- Playing career: 2014–present

Jesper Ylivainio (born February 7, 1997) is a Swedish professional ice hockey player. He is currently playing with Piteå HC of the HockeyEttan (Div.1).

On February 27, 2015, Ylivainio made his Swedish Hockey League debut playing with Luleå HF during the 2014–15 SHL season.
