= Jesper Odelberg =

Swedish comedian

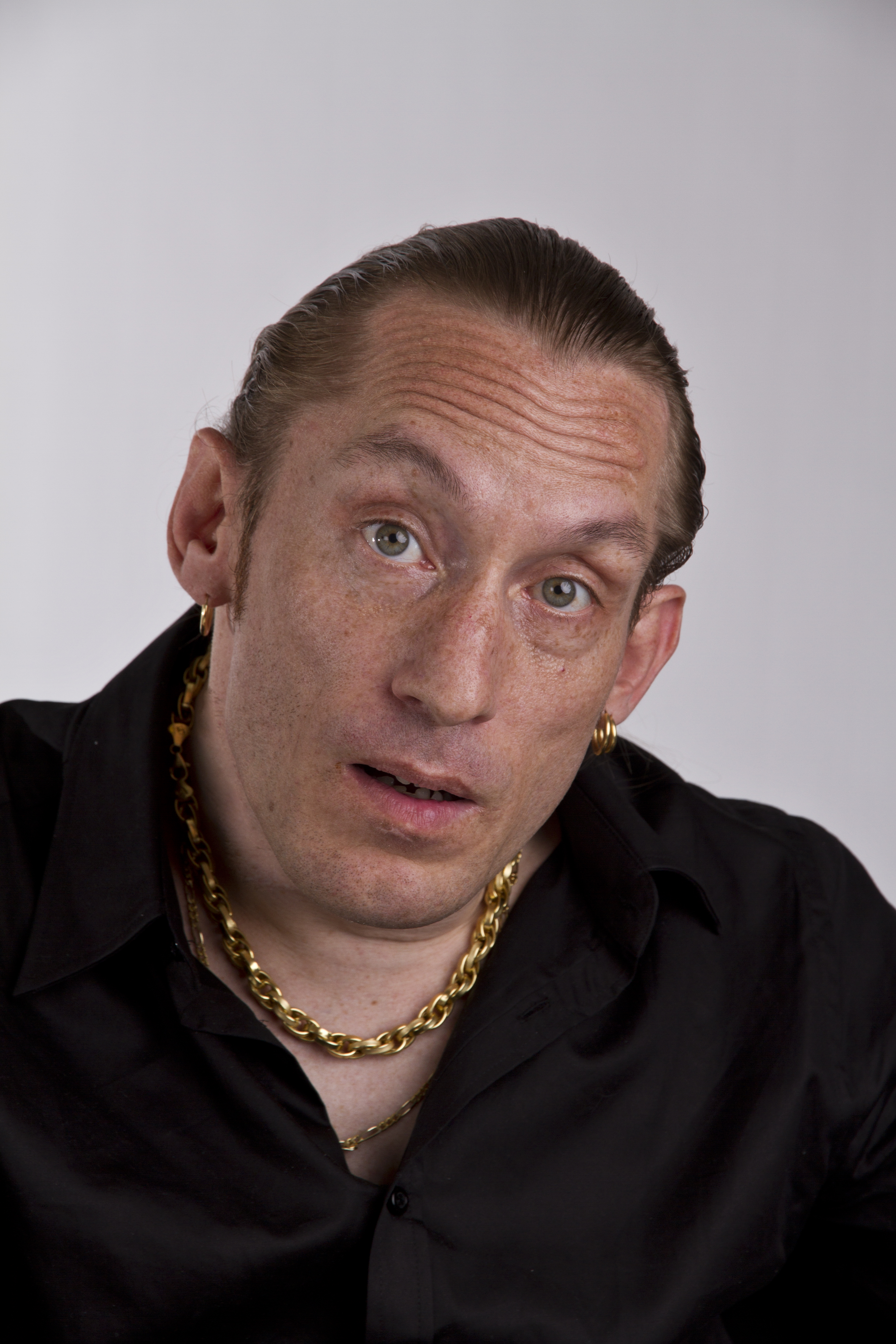
Jesper Odelberg

Jesper Odelberg (born 23 July 1970) is a Swedish comedian with cerebral palsy.

Odelberg's first stand-up performance was in Ljungskile in October 1992 and he started working professionally as a comedian 1995. Odelberg has toured throughout Sweden, Norway, and Finland since 1995. He has also toured as a folk singer together with the pianist Thomas Darelid.

He worked at the Backa Theatre in Gothenburg during 1994–1998 as a production assistant.

His big breakthrough was 1997 in the TV show Släng dig i brunnen. He is known for being very self-exposing and often jokes about cerebral palsy. since he has it himself.

In 1998, Jesper did 70 shows performing the Den onde, den gode och den fule with Thomas Oredsson, Jan Bylund, and Håkan Jäder under the direction of the National Swedish Touring Theatre.

His appearance on Norwegian television in 2006 with his band, Boys on Wheels, brought him wider fame, when it appeared on various Internet video sharing sites.

He is brother to the songwriter and artist Joakim Odelberg and he has a sister named Pia Emanuelsson.
