= Caspar =

Caspar is a masculine given name. It may refer to:

== People ==
- Caspar (magus), a name traditionally given to one of the Three Magi in the Bible who brought the baby Jesus gifts
- Caspar Austa (born 1982), Estonian cyclist
- Caspar Badrutt (1848–1904), Swiss businessman and pioneer of alpine resorts
- Caspar Barlaeus (1584–1648), Dutch polymath, Renaissance humanist, theologian, poet and historian
- Caspar Bartholin the Elder (1585–1629), Danish theologian and medical professor
- Caspar Bartholin the Younger (1655–1738), Danish anatomist
- Caspar Buberl (1834–1899), American sculptor
- Caspar del Bufalo (1786–1837), Italian priest and saint
- Caspar Commelijn (1668–1731), Dutch botanist
- Caspar de Crayer (1582–1669), Flemish painter
- Caspar Cruciger the Younger (1525–1597), German theologian, son of Caspar Creuziger
- Caspar Creuziger or Caspar Cruciger the Elder (1504–1548), German humanist, professor of theology and preacher
- Caspar Detlef Gustav Müller (1927–2003), German professor and Coptologist
- Caspar Einem (born 1948), Austrian politician
- Caspar Ett (1788–1847), German composer and organist
- Caspar David Friedrich (1774–1840), German painter
- Caspar F. Goodrich (1847–1925), US Navy rear admiral
- Caspar René Gregory (1846–1917), American-born German theologian
- Caspar Frederik Harsdorff (1735–1799), Danish architect
- Caspar Hennenberger (1529–1600), German Lutheran pastor, historian and cartographer
- Caspar John (1903–1984), British First Sea Lord and admiral of the fleet
- Caspar Lee (1994), South African YouTuber and actor
- Caspar Levias (1860–1934), Lithuanian-American academic
- Caspar Memering (born 1953), German former footballer
- Caspar Neher (1897–1962), Austrian-German scenographer and librettist, best known for his work with Bertolt Brecht
- Caspar Netscher (1639–1684), Dutch painter
- Caspar Olevian (1536–1587), German theologian
- Caspar Peucer (1525–1602), German reformer, physician and scholar
- Caspar Georg Carl Reinwardt (1773–1854), Prussian-born Dutch botanist
- Caspar de Robles, (1527–1585), ruler of two provinces of the Netherlands
- Caspar Schoppe (1576–1649), German controversialist and scholar
- Caspar Schütz (c. 1540 – 1594), German historian
- Caspar Schwenckfeld (1489 or 1490–1561), German theologian, writer, preacher, Protestant Reformer and spiritualist
- Caspar Stoll (probably between 1725 and 1730–1791), Dutch entomologist
- Caspar Voght (1752–1839), German merchant and social reformer
- Caspar Weinberger (1917–2006), American politician and U.S. Secretary of Defense
- Caspar Wessel (1745–1818), Norwegian-Danish mathematician and cartographer
- Caspar Wistar (glassmaker) (1696–1752), German-born glassmaker and landowner in Pennsylvania
- Caspar Wistar (physician) (1761–1818), American physician and anatomist, grandson of the above
- Caspar van Wittel (1652 or 1653–1736), Dutch painter
- Caspar Veldkamp (born 1964), Dutch politician
- Caspar Whitney (1864–1929), American author, editor, explorer and war correspondent
- Caspar Friedrich Wolff (1735–1794), German physiologist and one of the founders of embryology
- Caspar Wrede (1929–1998), Finnish film and theatre director

== Places ==
- Caspar, California

== Fictional characters ==
- Caspar von Bergliez, a fictional character from the video game Fire Emblem: Three Houses and Fire Emblem Warriors: Three Hopes

== See also ==
- Casper (given name)
