= Anton Hedman =

Swedish ice hockey player

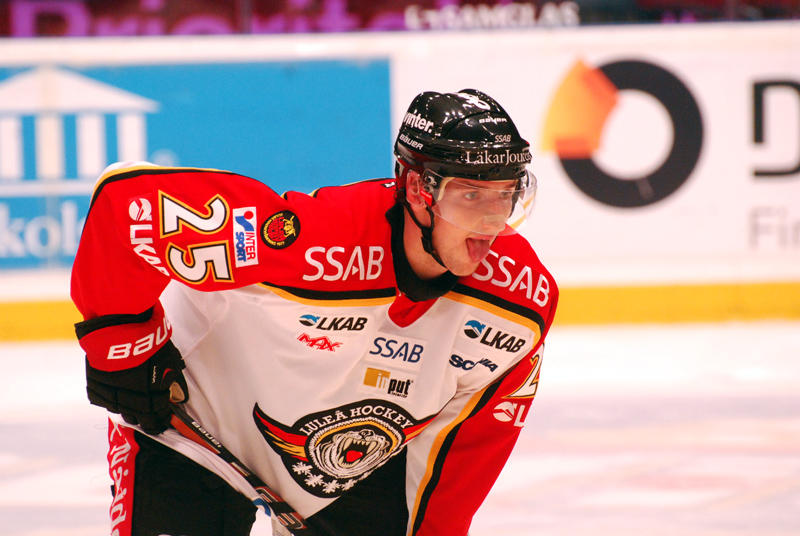
- Born: 15 May 1986 (age 40) Stockholm, Sweden
- Height: 6 ft 3 in (191 cm)
- Weight: 209 lb (95 kg; 14 st 13 lb)
- Position: Winger
- Shot: Left
- SHL team Former teams: Djurgårdens IF; Modo Hockey; Luleå HF; Färjestad BK; Örebro HK
- NHL draft: 255th overall, 2004; Boston Bruins
- Playing career: 2007–2020

Anton Hedman (born 15 May 1986) is a former Swedish professional ice hockey player (winger), who played for Djurgårdens IF of the Swedish Hockey League (SHL).He was drafted as 255th overall by the Boston Bruins in the 2004 NHL entry draft.

His youth team was Tranebergs IF. He has previously played in the SHL with Modo Hockey, Luleå HF, Färjestad BK and Örebro HK.

On 10 May 2019, Hedman agreed to one-year contract with former junior club, Djurgårdens IF of the SHL.

== Career statistics ==
			Regular season					Playoffs
Season	Team	League	GP	G	A	Pts	PIM	GP	G	A	Pts	PIM
2001–02	Hammarby IF	SWE U16	5	2	0	2	4	—	—	—	—	—
2003–04	Stocksunds IF	J18 Allsv	14	5	5	10	14	—	—	—	—	—
2004–05	Djurgårdens IF	J20	32	14	9	23	119	—	—	—	—	—
2005–06	Sudbury Wolves	OHL	60	18	16	34	126	8	1	3	4	19
2006–07	Owen Sound Attack	OHL	39	12	12	24	73	—	—	—	—	—
2006–07	Guelph Storm	OHL	28	5	7	12	38	4	0	1	1	8
2007–08	Västerås IK	Allsv	9	0	1	1	39	—	—	—	—	—
2007–08	Almtuna IS	Allsv	9	0	2	2	47	—	—	—	—	—
2007–08	Hammarby IF	Allsv	11	1	2	3	12	—	—	—	—	—
2008–09	Växjö Lakers	Allsv	42	2	7	9	65	7	0	0	0	8
2009–10	Växjö Lakers	Allsv	51	9	14	23	117	7	3	2	5	12
2010–11	Modo Hockey	SEL	48	5	8	13	97	—	—	—	—	—
2011–12	Modo Hockey	SEL	52	1	3	4	28	5	0	0	0	2
2012–13	Luleå HF	SEL	46	7	6	13	34	11	1	2	3	10
2013–14	Luleå HF	SHL	47	10	5	15	84	6	1	0	1	4
2014–15	Färjestad BK	SHL	52	5	11	16	58	3	0	2	2	2
2015–16	Luleå HF	SHL	49	9	12	21	54	11	0	1	1	8
2016–17	Luleå HF	SHL	48	8	14	22	22	2	0	0	0	0
2017–18	Luleå HF	SHL	36	4	3	7	44	—	—	—	—	—
2017–18	Örebro HK	SHL	10	1	7	8	10	—	—	—	—	—
2018–19	Örebro HK	SHL	48	9	14	23	28	2	0	0	0	14
2019–20	Djurgårdens IF	SHL	32	5	7	12	57	—	—	—	—	—
Allsv totals			122	12	26	38	280	14	3	2	5	20
SEL/SHL totals			468	64	90	154	516	40	2	5	7	40
