= Jesper Knudsen (painter) =

Danish painter (born 1964)

Jesper Knudsen (born 1964) is a Danish painter. Knudsen's paintings have been compared to street art because they appear very spontaneously made. While painting, Knudsen turns the canvas around several times. Strange animals, patterns, faces, bodies, parts of bodies are painted in strong colours in several layers covering part of each other. In the early works the motifs were often accompanied by small texts and words. The medium is oil or acrylic on canvas, but graphic works have also been part of Knudsen's production so far.

== Literature ==
Galerie Moderne. ”Jesper Knudsen”, 2006 27 sider illustreret i farver. Foto: Ralf Sørensen. Parallelle tekster på dansk og engelsk.
