= Tobias Sjökvist =

Swedish ice hockey player

- Born: August 18, 1995 (age 30) Karlskoga, Sweden
- Height: 5 ft 10 in (178 cm)
- Weight: 183 lb (83 kg; 13 st 1 lb)
- Position: Forward
- Shoots: Left
- Hockeyettan team Former teams: Lindlövens IF; BIK Karlskoga; Mariestad BoIS; Färjestad BK; Örnsköldsvik HF; Köping HC; Borlänge HF; Tranås AIF; Linden Hockey; Lindlövens IF
- Playing career: 2013–present

Tobias Sjökvist (born August 18, 1995) is a Swedish ice hockey player. He is currently playing with BIK Karlskoga of the Hockeyettan. His father Niklas Sjökvist was also a proplayer.

== Career ==
He made his debut for BIK Karlskoga in the HockeyAllsvenskan where he played in the 2013-14 season 4 games. Sjökvist played one game in the Swedish Hockey League with Färjestad BK during the 2014–15 SHL season. He was also in the 2014-15 season on loan to Mariestad BoIS where he played 2 games in the HockeyEttan. In the season 2015-16 he played 33 games in the HockeyEttan for Örnsköldsvik HF. The following seasons he played for a bunch of clubs in the HockeyEttan: Köping HC, Borlänge HF, Tranås AIF and Linden Hockey.

== Career statistics ==
=== Regular season and playoffs ===
			Regular season					Playoffs
Season	Team	League	GP	G	A	Pts	PIM	GP	G	A	Pts	PIM
2013–14	BIK Karlskoga	Allsv	4	0	0	0	0	1	0	0	0	0
2014–15	Färjestad BK	SHL	1	0	0	0	0	—	—	—	—	—
2014–15	Mariestad BoIS	HockeyEttan	2	0	0	0	0	—	—	—	—	—
2015–16	Örnsköldsvik HF	HockeyEttan	33	4	7	11	0	2	0	0	0	0
2016–17	Köping HC	HockeyEttan	34	15	7	22	2	—	—	—	—	—
2017–18	Köping HC	HockeyEttan	32	17	15	32	10	5	2	2	4	0
2018–19	Borlänge HF	HockeyEttan	40	7	16	23	10	3	0	0	0	0
2019–20	Tranås AIF	HockeyEttan	27	9	5	14	4	—	—	—	—	—
2020–21	Tranås AIF	HockeyEttan	17	2	2	4	4	—	—	—	—	—
2020–21	Linden Hockey	HockeyEttan	27	12	23	35	10	2	0	0	0	0
2021–22	Linden Hockey	HockeyEttan	36	16	16	32	6	10	5	5	10	0
2022–23	Lindlövens IF	HockeyEttan	36	16	18	34	37	—	—	—	—	—
2022–23	BIK Karlskoga	Allsv	2	0	0	0	0	—	—	—	—	—
2023–24	Lindlövens IF	HockeyEttan	34	12	18	30	12	6	5	1	6	4
2023–24	BIK Karlskoga	Allsv	2	0	0	0	0	—	—	—	—	—
2024–25	BIK Karlskoga	Allsv
SHL totals			1	0	0	0	0	—	—	—	—	—
Allsv totals			4	0	0	0	0	1	0	0	0	0
HockeyEttan totals			248	82	91	173	46	22	7	7	14	0
