= Jesper Alasaari =

Swedish ice hockey player

- Born: December 27, 1995 (age 30) Karlskoga, Sweden
- Height: 6 ft 3 in (191 cm)
- Weight: 216 lb (98 kg; 15 st 6 lb)
- Position: Defence
- Shoots: Left
- Alps Hockey League team Former teams: EHC Lustenau; Färjestad BK; Tingsryds AIF; Kristianstads IK; Kumla Hockey; IF Sundsvall Hockey; Tranås AIF; HC Flyers; Lindlövens IF; BIK Karlskoga; Guildford Flames; Herlev Eagles
- NHL draft: Undrafted
- Playing career: 2014–present

Jesper Alasaari (born December 27, 1995) is a Swedish ice hockey defenceman currently signed to Austrian Alps Hockey League side EHC Lustenau. He had most recently played in Denmark with Herlev Eagles and with UK Elite Ice Hockey League (EIHL) side Guildford Flames.

Alasaari made his Swedish Hockey League debut playing with Färjestad BK during the 2014–15 SHL season.
