= Jesper Olesen =

Danish footballer (born 1980)

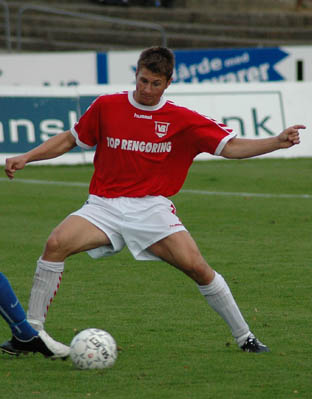

Personal information
- Date of birth: 13 October 1980 (age 46)
- Place of birth: Denmark
- Height: 1.85 m (6 ft 1 in)
- Position: Defender

Team information
- Current team: Vejle Boldklub
- Number: 2

Youth career
- 1984–93: Kolding Boldklub
- 1993–96: Haderslev FK
- 1996–2000: Vejle Boldklub

Senior career*
| Years | Team | Apps | (Gls) |
| 2000–present | Vejle Boldklub | 196 | (3) |
- * Club domestic league appearances and goals as of May 22, 2009

Jesper Olesen (born 13 October 1980) is a Danish professional football player, who currently plays for Vejle Boldklub in the Danish Superliga. Olesen, who has played in Vejle since 1996, is known as a fighter, which he has proved several times by always regaining his position on the right back even though supplements have been brought in from other clubs. In his career in Vejle he has been playing as a semi-professional while finishing his education as a carpenter.

Olesens contract with the club is running until 30 June 2009.
