= Jesper Jensen (footballer) =

Danish footballer (born 1988)

Personal information
- Date of birth: 22 April 1988 (age 38)
- Place of birth: Denmark
- Height: 1.78 m (5 ft 10 in)
- Position: Midfielder

Senior career*
Years	Team	Apps	(Gls)
2005–2010	SønderjyskE		
2010	→ Vejle BK (loan)		
2010–2012	Vejle BK		
2011–2012	→ Stjarnan (loan)		
2012–2013	ÍA		

International career^{‡}
2007	Denmark U-20	3	(0)
- * Club domestic league appearances and goals ‡ National team caps and goals as of 3 August 2007

Jesper Jensen (born 22 April 1988) is a Danish professional football midfielder.
