= Martin Karlsson (ice hockey, born 1996) =

Swedish ice hockey player

- Born: February 13, 1996 (age 29) Borås, Sweden
- Height: 6 ft 0 in (183 cm)
- Weight: 193 lb (88 kg; 13 st 11 lb)
- Position: Left wing
- Shoots: Left
- SHL team: Färjestad BK
- NHL draft: Undrafted
- Playing career: 2015–present

Martin Karlsson (born February 13, 1996) is a Swedish ice hockey player. He is currently playing with Färjestad BK of the Swedish Hockey League (SHL).

Karlsson made his Swedish Hockey League debut playing with Färjestad BK during the 2014–15 SHL season.
