= Jesper Ovesen =

- Born: Jesper Ovesen; 1957 (age 68–69); Denmark
- Education: Copenhagen Business School, Harvard Business School
- Known for: Nokia Siemens Networks, CFO, TDC A/S, CFO, Lego

Jesper Ovesen (born 1957) was the Executive Chairman of the board of Nokia Siemens Networks. Before being appointed to the board of Nokia Siemens Networks, he was the CFO of Danish telecommunications group TDC A/S.

== Biography ==
Born in 1957, in Hjørring, Denmark, Ovesen was educated at the Copenhagen Business School attaining an MSc degree in 1985, and at the Harvard Business School Program for Management Development in 1991.

== Career ==
Ovesen is the Executive Chairman of the board of Nokia Siemens Networks, since September 2011. Before joining Nokia Siemens Networks, Ovesen held a number of senior management positions in European companies in a range of industries. Most recently, he served as CFO of Danish telecommunications group TDC A/S during the company's restructuring process and initial public offering. Ovesen has also served as CEO at Kirkbi, the investment company of the Kirk Kristiansen Family, CFO at Lego and CFO at Danske Bank. He has extensive experience in finance and M&A activities, and is a certified accountant.

== Other interests ==
Ovesen is a member of the board of Orkla Group (since 2010), a member of the board of FLSmidth (since 2005) and a member of the board of Skandinaviska Enskilda Banken (since 2004).
