= Linda Gallo =

American scientist

- Occupation: Professor
- Awards: Outstanding Faculty Award, Outstanding Contribution to Health Psychology (APA), Distinguished Scientific Award for Early Career Contribution to (Health) Psychology (APA), Early Career Honorary Recognition Award, Society of Behavioral Medicine

Academic background
- Education: University of Utah

Linda C. Gallo is a scientist known for behavioral medicine. Gallo is a professor at San Diego State University and serves as a part of the San Diego State / University of California, San Diego Joint Doctoral Program in Clinical Psychology. She serves as a co-director at the South Bay Latino Research Center.

Gallo has achieved many awards for her contributions to the field of clinical psychology. Some notable awards include the 2004 Outstanding Contribution to Health Psychology Young Investigator Award from Division 38 of the American Psychological Association (APA), 2005 Early Career Honorary Recognition Award from the Society of Behavioral Medicine, 2008 Distinguished Scientific Award for Early Career Contribution to Health Psychology, 2013 and 2015 Most Influential Professor from the SDSU/UCSD Joint Doctoral Program in Clinical Psychology, and 2016 SDSU Alumni Award for Outstanding Faculty Contributions.

In 2009 Gallo was a Fellow of the Society of Behavioral Medicine. In 2012, she was a Fellow of APA and APA Division 38.

Gallo is the co-author of the Handbook of Physiological Research Methods in Health Psychology with Linda J. Luecken.

== Biography ==
Gallo earned her bachelor's degree in psychology in May 1989 at Southern Illinois University. She later completed her master's degree in clinical psychology/health specialty in May 1996 at the University of Utah. She continued her studies to complete her PhD for clinical psychology with a health specialty in May 1998. Lastly, she completed her postdoctoral at the University of Pittsburgh, in cardiovascular behavioral medicine in August 2000.

Between 2000 and 2001, Gallo worked as an assistant professor, in the Department of Psychology at Kent State University. Between 2001 and 2006, she was an assistant professor in the Department of Psychology at San Diego State University. She worked as an associate professor from 2006 to 2011. Since 2011, she is a professor at San Diego State University. In 2015, she became the co-director of the South Bay Latino Research Center.

She focused her postdoctoral in Cardiovascular Behavioral Medicine at the University of Pittsburgh. Gallo has 20 years of postdoctoral research experience focused on understanding psychosocial and sociocultural factors in cardiovascular disease and diabetes. In addition, Gallo focused on developing and testing culturally appropriate interventions to reduce risk and improve outcomes for these conditions in Hispanics/Latinos.

== Research ==
Gallo's research focuses on the psychological aspects of cardio-metabolic disorders. She has 20 years of postdoctoral research experience focused on elucidating sociocultural factors in chronic cardio-metabolic diseases and developing and testing culturally appropriate interventions to reduce disparities in these conditions among underserved groups, especially Hispanics/Latinos. Gallo has stated that the related traits of hostility, anger, and aggressiveness have long been suggested as risk factors for coronary heart disease. Her research has determined that these negative emotions play a large role in overall health.

== Representative publications ==
- Gallo, L. C., Bogart, L. M., Vranceanu, A. M., & Matthews, K. A. (2005). Socioeconomic status, resources, psychological experiences, and emotional responses: a test of the reserve capacity model. Journal of Personality and Social Psychology, 88(2), 386–399.
- Gallo, L. C., & Matthews, K. A. (2003). Understanding the association between socioeconomic status and physical health: do negative emotions play a role?. Psychological Bulletin, 129(1), 10–51.
- Gallo, L. C., Penedo, F. J., Espinosa de los Monteros, K., & Arguelles, W. (2009). Resiliency in the face of disadvantage: do Hispanic cultural characteristics protect health outcomes? Journal of Personality, 77(6), 1707–1746.
- Gallo, L. C., & Smith, T. W. (2001). Attachment style in marriage: Adjustment and responses to interaction. Journal of Social and Personal Relationships, 18(2), 263–289.
- Gallo, L. C., Troxel, W. M., Matthews, K. A., & Kuller, L. H. (2003). Marital status and quality in middle-aged women: Associations with levels and trajectories of cardiovascular risk factors. Health Psychology, 22(5), 453–463.
