= Jesper Ahle =

Danish handball player (born 1981)

Personal information
- Full name: Jesper Tvistholm Ahle
- Nationality: Danish (Denmark)
- Born: 13 February 1981 (age 45) Nørre Felding, Holstebro Municipality, Denmark
- Height: 190 cm (75 in)

Sport
- Sport: Handball
- Position: Line player
- Current club: Retired
- Number: 21

Senior clubs
- Years: Team
- 1999-2008: Team Tvis Holstebro
- 2008-2009: Fredericia HK
- 2009: Lemvig-Thyborøn Håndbold
- 2009-2012: Bjerringbro-Silkeborg
- 2012: Aalborg Håndbold
National team
Years	Team	Apps	(Gls)
2003-2004	Denmark	6	(8)

Jesper Ahle (born 13 February 1981) is a Danish former handball player. He retired in 2012 after playing a single season for Aalborg Håndbold in the Danish Handball League. He switched from Bjerringbro-Silkeborg to Aalborg Håndbold to replace the long term injured Olexandr Shevelev. Previously he played for Team Tvis Holstebro, Fredericia HK and Lemvig-Thyborøn Håndbold.

Ahle has made six appearances for the Danish national handball team.
