= Jesper Mattson =

Swedish ice hockey player (born 1995)

- Born: August 4, 1995 (age 30) Sweden
- Height: 5 ft 10 in (178 cm)
- Weight: 174 lb (79 kg; 12 st 6 lb)
- Position: Defence
- Shoots: Left
- SHL team: Leksands IF
- NHL draft: Undrafted
- Playing career: 2014–present

Jesper Mattson (born August 4, 1995) is a Swedish ice hockey defenceman. He currently plays for Leksands IF of the Swedish Hockey League (SHL).

Mattson made his Swedish Hockey League debut playing with Leksands IF during the 2014–15 SHL season.
