= Eva Nováková =

Czech politician

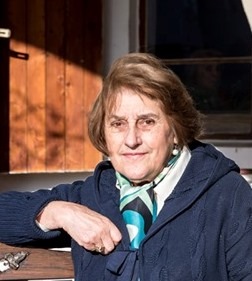

Senator from Kroměříž
- In office 23 November 1996 – 23 November 1998
- Succeeded by: František Kroupa

Member of Federal Assembly
- In office 1990–1992

Member of Parliament
- In office 1992–1996

Personal details
- Born: 18 January 1938 (age 88) Martin, Czechoslovakia
- Party: HSD–SMS (1990–1992); KDU–ČSL (1992–present)

Eva Nováková (born 18 January 1938) is a Czech politician. Having served in the Federal Assembly of Czechoslovakia, she went on to serve in the Chamber of Deputies of the Parliament of the Czech Republic before representing Kroměříž as a senator from 1996 to 1998.
