= List of current SHL captains and alternate captains =

The following players have been named captains and alternate captains of their Swedish Hockey League (SHL) teams for the 2016–17 season.

Team	Captain	Alternate Captain(s)
Brynäs IF	Anton Rödin	Elias Fälth
Brynäs IF	Anton Rödin	Ryan Gunderson
Brynäs IF	Anton Rödin	Lukas Kilström
Djurgården	Joakim Eriksson	Alexander Fällström
Djurgården	Joakim Eriksson	Markus Ljungh
Djurgården	Joakim Eriksson	Calle Ridderwall
Frölunda HC	Joel Lundqvist	Nicklas Lasu
Frölunda HC	Joel Lundqvist	Henrik Tömmernes
Färjestad BK	Magnus Nygren	Alexander Johansson
Färjestad BK	Magnus Nygren	Ole-Kristian Tollefsen
HV71	Chris Abbott	Martin Thörnberg
HV71	Chris Abbott	Simon Önerud
Karlskrona HK	Morten Madsen	Alexander Bergström
Karlskrona HK	Morten Madsen	Daniel Gunnarsson
Karlskrona HK	Morten Madsen	Mattias Karlsson
Leksands IF	Jesper Ollas	Martin Karlsson
Leksands IF	Jesper Ollas	Jon Knuts
Linköpings HC	Niklas Persson	Andrew Gordon
Linköpings HC	Niklas Persson	Sebastian Karlsson
Luleå HF	Johan Harju	Karl Fabricius
Luleå HF	Johan Harju	Brendan Mikkelson
Luleå HF	Johan Harju	Jan Sandström
Malmö Redhawks	Erik Forssell	Robin Alvarez
Malmö Redhawks	Erik Forssell	Nils Andersson
Malmö Redhawks	Erik Forssell	Andreas Thuresson
Rögle BK	Christopher Liljewall	Dominik Granak
Rögle BK	Christopher Liljewall	Ludvig Rensfeldt
Skellefteå AIK	Jimmie Ericsson	Pär Lindholm
Skellefteå AIK	Jimmie Ericsson	Joakim Lindström
Växjö Lakers	Liam Reddox	Erik Josefsson
Växjö Lakers	Liam Reddox	Tuomas Kiiskinen
Örebro HK	Viktor Ekbom	Joakim Andersson
Örebro HK	Viktor Ekbom	Alexander Hellström
Örebro HK	Viktor Ekbom	Tom Wandell
