= 2017–18 SHL season =

2017–2018 season of the Swedish Hockey League

- League: Swedish Hockey League
- Sport: Ice hockey
- Duration: September 2017 – April 2018

Regular season
- First place: Växjö Lakers
- Top scorer: Elias Pettersson (Växjö Lakers)

Playoffs
- Playoffs MVP: Elias Pettersson (Växjö Lakers)
- Finals champions: Växjö Lakers
- Runners-up: Skellefteå AIK

SHL seasons
- 2016–17 2018–19

The 2017–18 SHL season was the 43rd season of the Swedish Hockey League (SHL). The season began in September 2017, and the regular season ended in March 2018, to be followed by the Swedish Championship playoffs, as well as relegation playoffs. The league consisted of 14 teams. The only new addition for this season was Mora IK, who replaced Leksands IF after defeating them in the 2017 SHL qualifiers.

== Regular season ==
SHL team map

=== Standings ===
Pos	Team	Pld	W	OTW	OTL	L	GF	GA	GD	Pts	Qualification
1	Växjö Lakers	52	34	6	2	10	169	104	+65	116	Qualification to Quarter-finals
2	Djurgårdens IF	52	23	9	8	12	153	111	+42	95	Qualification to Quarter-finals
3	Frölunda HC	52	25	7	5	15	159	137	+22	94	Qualification to Quarter-finals
4	Färjestad BK	52	23	6	6	17	174	145	+29	87	Qualification to Quarter-finals
5	Skellefteå AIK	52	26	3	3	20	145	118	+27	87	Qualification to Quarter-finals
6	Malmö Redhawks	52	20	8	10	14	152	138	+14	86	Qualification to Quarter-finals
7	Luleå HF	52	19	10	4	19	128	117	+11	81	Qualification to Round of 16
8	HV71	52	21	6	6	19	145	143	+2	81	Qualification to Round of 16
9	Linköpings HC	52	21	3	9	19	135	130	+5	78	Qualification to Round of 16
10	Brynäs IF	52	21	2	3	26	132	148	−16	70	Qualification to Round of 16
11	Rögle BK	52	16	4	5	27	132	169	−37	61	
12	Örebro HK	52	14	4	8	26	121	151	−30	58	
13	Mora IK	52	13	5	2	32	104	163	−59	51	Qualification to Relegation playoffs
14	Karlskrona HK	52	11	4	6	31	101	176	−75	47	Qualification to Relegation playoffs

Updated to match(es) played on 10 March 2018. Source: SHL.se
Rules for classification: 1) Points; 2) Goal difference; 3) Number of goals scored

=== Statistics ===
==== Scoring leaders ====
List shows the ten best skaters based on the number of points during the regular season. If two or more skaters are tied (i.e. same number of points, goals and played games), all of the tied skaters are shown.

As of 10 March 2018

GP = Games played; G = Goals; A = Assists; Pts = Points; +/– = Plus/minus; PIM = Penalty minutes

Player	Team	GP	G	A	Pts	+/–	PIM
(Sweden) Elias Pettersson	Växjö Lakers	44	24	32	56	+27	14
(United States) Ryan Lasch	Frölunda HC	49	15	40	55	+4	18
(Sweden) Joakim Lindström	Skellefteå AIK	46	16	34	50	+17	63
(Sweden) Pär Lindholm	Skellefteå AIK	49	18	29	47	+18	28
(Sweden) Johan Ryno	Färjestad BK	46	9	37	46	+13	28
(Sweden) Dick Axelsson	Färjestad BK	48	21	24	45	+8	44
(United States) Aaron Palushaj	Brynäs IF	51	19	26	45	–3	42
(Sweden) Victor Olofsson	Frölunda HC	50	27	16	43	+1	8
(Sweden) Oscar Möller	Skellefteå AIK	49	18	24	42	+15	6
(Canada) Andrew Calof	Växjö Lakers	52	24	17	41	+17	14

==== Leading goaltenders ====
These are the leaders in GAA among goaltenders who played at least 40% of the team's minutes. The table is sorted by GAA, and the criteria for inclusion are bolded.

As of 10 March 2018

GP = Games played; TOI = Time on ice (minutes); GA = Goals against; SO = Shutouts; Sv% = Save percentage; GAA = Goals against average

Player	Team	GP	TOI	GA	SO	Sv%	GAA
(Sweden) Adam Reideborn	Djurgårdens IF	30	1817:38	48	2	93.70	1.58
(Sweden) Gustaf Lindvall	Skellefteå AIK	21	1256:33	38	2	93.04	1.81
(Sweden) Viktor Fasth	Växjö Lakers	33	1937:13	65	6	91.78	2.01
(Sweden) Joel Lassinantti	Luleå HF	34	1923:30	68	4	91.46	2.12
(Sweden) Johan Mattsson	Frölunda HC	24	1296:53	48	2	91.41	2.22
(Sweden) Joacim Eriksson	Djurgårdens IF	24	1343:03	51	2	91.27	2.28
(Sweden) Jonas Gustavsson	Linköpings HC	36	2047:10	80	3	91.63	2.34
(Sweden) Oscar Alsenfelt	Malmö Redhawks	36	2090:31	82	2	91.48	2.35
(Norway) Lars Haugen	Färjestad BK	31	1794:26	71	1	91.53	2.37
(Finland) Joni Ortio	Skellefteå AIK	31	1846:33	74	2	91.14	2.40

== Playoffs ==
Ten teams qualify for the playoffs. Teams 1–6 have a bye to the quarterfinals, while teams 7–10 meet each other in a preliminary playoff round.

=== Playoff bracket ===
In the first round the 7th-ranked team will meet the 10th-ranked team and the 8th-ranked team will meet the 9th-ranked team for a place in the second round. In the second round, the top-ranked team will meet the lowest-ranked winner of the first round, the 2nd-ranked team will face the other winner of the first round, the 3rd-ranked team will face the 6th-ranked team, and the 4th-ranked team will face the 5th-ranked team. In the third round, the highest remaining seed is matched against the lowest remaining seed. In each round the higher-seeded team is awarded home advantage. In the first round the meetings are played as best-of-three series and the rest is best-of-seven series that follows an alternating home team format: the higher-seeded team will play at home for games 1 and 3 (plus 5 and 7 if necessary), and the lower-seeded team will be at home for game 2 and 4 (plus 6 if necessary).

First round
7	Luleå HF	1
10	**Brynäs IF**	**2**
8	HV71	0
9	**Linköpings HC**	**2**

Quarterfinals
1	**Växjö Lakers**	**4**
10	Brynäs IF	1
2	**Djurgårdens IF**	**4**
9	Linköpings HC	1
3	Frölunda HC	2
6	**Malmö Redhawks**	**4**
4	Färjestad BK	2
5	**Skellefteå AIK**	**4**

Semifinals
1	**Växjö Lakers**	**4**
6	Malmö Redhawks	0
(Pairings are re-seeded after the first and second round)
2	Djurgårdens IF	2
5	**Skellefteå AIK**	**4**

Finals
1	**Växjö Lakers**	**4**
5	Skellefteå AIK	0

=== Round of 16 ===
The teams ranked 7 and 10, and the teams ranked 8 and 9, respectively, will face each other in a best-of-three series in order to qualify for the quarter-finals. The better-ranked teams in the two series will receive home advantage, i.e. two home games, if necessary. The two winners will take the two remaining quarter-final spots.

==== (7) Luleå HF vs. (10) Brynäs IF ====
12 March	Luleå HF	**2–3**	**Brynäs IF**	Coop Norrbotten Arena	Recap
Johan Harju 1 – pp – 11:13		**First period**	10:12 – Kevin Clark 1
Johan Harju 2 – 17:43		**Second period**	5:34 – Johan Alcén 1
No scoring		**Third period**	19:32 – Juuso Ikonen 1
Filip Gustavsson (22 saves / 25 shots)		**Goalie stats**	David Rautio (24 saves / 26 shots)

14 March	Brynäs IF	**1–2**	**Luleå HF**	Gavlerinken Arena	Recap
Jacob Blomqvist 1 – pp – 17:52		**First period**	No scoring
No scoring		**Second period**	13:53 – Patrick Cehlin 1
No scoring		**Third period**	0:38 – Robin Kovacs 1
David Rautio (21 saves / 23 shots)		**Goalie stats**	Filip Gustavsson (23 saves / 24 shots)

16 March	Luleå HF	**2–4**	**Brynäs IF**	Coop Norrbotten Arena	Recap
No scoring		**First period**	3:48 – Juuso Ikonen 2; 4:09 – Ryan Gunderson 1
Emil Larsson 1 – 8:15		**Second period**	1:24 – Juuso Ikonen 3
Robin Kovacs 2 – 9:27		**Third period**	19:15 – en – Linus Ölund 1
Filip Gustavsson (6 saves / 8 shots); Joel Lassinantti (21 saves / 22 shots)		**Goalie stats**	David Rautio (33 saves / 35 shots)

**Brynäs IF won series 2–1**

==== (8) HV71 vs. (9) Linköpings HC ====
12 March	HV71	**1–3**	**Linköpings HC**	Kinnarps Arena	Recap
Pierre Engvall 1 – 8:25		**First period**	3:13 – Jakob Lilja 1; 5:54 – Andrew Gordon 1
No scoring		**Second period**	No scoring
No scoring		**Third period**	13:43 – Derek Roy 1
Felix Sandström (23 saves / 26 shots)		**Goalie stats**	Jonas Gustavsson (19 saves / 20 shots)

14 March	**Linköpings HC**	**3–2**	HV71	Saab Arena	Recap
Mathis Olimb 1 – 16:01		**First period**	No scoring
Chad Billins 1 – pp2 – 4:44; Kristian Näkyvä 1 – 15:42		**Second period**	11:12 – Bill Sweatt 1
No scoring		**Third period**	19:37 – Max Wärn 1
Jonas Gustavsson (37 saves / 39 shots)		**Goalie stats**	Fredrik Pettersson-Wentzel (31 saves / 34 shots)

**Linköpings HC won series 2–0**

=== Quarter-finals ===
==== (1) Växjö Lakers vs. (10) Brynäs IF ====
18 March	**Växjö Lakers**	**4–1**	Brynäs IF	Vida Arena	Recap
Eric Martinsson 1 – 11:09		**First period**	No scoring
Robert Rosén 1 – pp – 12:22		**Second period**	14:11 – Jacob Blomqvist 2
Oliver Bohm 1 – 17:16; Tuomas Kiiskinen 1 – en – 19:20		**Third period**	No scoring
Viktor Fasth (13 saves / 14 shots)		**Goalie stats**	David Rautio (34 saves / 37 shots)

20 March	**Brynäs IF**	**4–3**	Växjö Lakers	Gavlerinken Arena	Recap
Linus Ölund – pp – 17:59		**First period**	14:29 – pp – Tuomas Kiiskinen 2
Kevin Clark 1 – pp – 5:19; Aaron Palushaj 1 – pp – 6:46; Simon Bertilsson 1 – pp – 18:07		**Second period**	13:03 – pp – Janne Pesonen 1
No scoring		**Third period**	12:04 – Andrew Calof 1
David Rautio (27 saves / 30 shots)		**Goalie stats**	Viktor Fasth (22 saves / 26 shots)

22 March	**Växjö Lakers**	**4–0**	Brynäs IF	Vida Arena	Recap
No scoring		**First period**	No scoring
Eric Martinsson 2 – pp – 7:40; Dennis Rasmussen 1 – 8:15; Robert Rosén 2 – pp – 16:57		**Second period**	No scoring
Linus Fröberg 1 – sh, en – 16:04		**Third period**	No scoring
Viktor Fasth (14 saves / 14 shots)		**Goalie stats**	David Rautio (20 saves / 23 shots); Linus Fernström (7 saves / 7 shots)

24 March	Brynäs IF	**3–5**	**Växjö Lakers**	Gavlerinken Arena	Recap
Johan Alcén 2 – 9:18		**First period**	No scoring
Kevin Clark 3 – pp – 9:09		**Second period**	2:49 – Linus Fröberg 2; 9:22 – Tuomas Kiiskinen 3
Jacob Blomqvist – 0:42		**Third period**	5:49 – Brendan Shinnimin 1; 7:46 – Robert Rosén 3; 10:31 – Elias Pettersson 1
Linus Fernström (42 saves / 47 shots)		**Goalie stats**	Viktor Fasth (16 saves / 19 shots)

26 March	**Växjö Lakers**	**3–0**	Brynäs IF	Vida Arena	Recap
Andy Miele 1 – 2:02; Janne Pesonen 2 – 3:44		**First period**	No scoring
No scoring		**Second period**	No scoring
Liam Reddox 1 – 10:29		**Third period**	No scoring
Viktor Fasth (20 saves / 20 shots)		**Goalie stats**	David Rautio (25 saves / 28 shots)

**Växjö Lakers won series 4–1**

==== (2) Djurgårdens IF vs. (9) Linköpings HC ====
18 March	**Djurgårdens IF**	**6–1**	Linköpings HC	Hovet	Recap
Jonathan Davidsson 1 – 12:21; Linus Hultström 1 – pp – 19:26		**First period**	10:26 – Jakob Lilja 2
Jonathan Davidsson 2 – 4:50; Markus Ljungh 1 – 8:45; Calle Ridderwall 1 – 12:35		**Second period**	No scoring
Axel Jonsson Fjällby 1 – 15:56		**Third period**	No scoring
Adam Reideborn (17 saves / 18 shots)		**Goalie stats**	Jonas Gustavsson (16 saves / 20 shots); Jacob Johansson (13 saves / 15 shots)

20 March	**Linköpings HC**	3–2	**3OT**	Djurgårdens IF	Saab Arena	Recap
No scoring		First period		No scoring
No scoring		Second period		1:56 – Jesper Pettersson 1
Jakob Lilja 3 – 2:37; Chad Billins 2 – 17:00		Third period		11:23 – pp – Gustav Possler 1
Chad Billins 3 – pp – 8:38		Third overtime period		No scoring
Jonas Gustavsson (53 saves / 55 shots)		Goalie stats		Adam Reideborn (39 saves / 42 shots)

22 March	**Djurgårdens IF**	**4–3**	Linköpings HC	Hovet	Recap
No scoring		**First period**	15:37 – pp – Henrik Törnqvist 1
Niclas Bergfors 1 – 8:22; Linus Johansson 1 – 12:39; Mikael Ahlén 1 – 15:00		**Second period**	15:54 – Ken André Olimb 1
Axel Jonsson Fjällby 2 – 9:14		**Third period**	14:27 – Andrew Gordon 2
Adam Reideborn (10 saves / 12 shots); Joacim Eriksson (6 saves / 7 shots)		**Goalie stats**	Jacob Johansson (25 saves / 29 shots)

24 March	Linköpings HC	**2–4**	**Djurgårdens IF**	Saab Arena	Recap
No scoring		**First period**	1:57 – Axel Jonsson Fjällby 3
Kristian Näkyvä 2 – pp – 9:10		**Second period**	6:30 – pp – Linus Hultström 2; 14:59 – pp2 – Linus Hultström 3
Andrew Gordon 3 – pp – 18:20		**Third period**	19:44 – sh, en – Axel Jonsson Fjällby 4
Jacob Johansson (31 saves / 34 shots)		**Goalie stats**	Joacim Eriksson (21 saves / 23 shots)

26 March	**Djurgårdens IF**	**5–4**	Linköpings HC	Hovet	Recap
No scoring		**First period**	No scoring
Mikael Ahlén 2 – 1:23; Axel Jonsson Fjällby 5 – 1:54; Gustav Possler 2 – 12:06		**Second period**	1:11 – pp – Kristian Näkyvä 3; 8:45 – Kristian Näkyvä 4
Markus Ljungh 2 – 16:41; Marcus Högström 1 – 19:55		**Third period**	9:18 – Ken André Olimb 2; 15:15 – Derek Roy 2
Adam Reideborn (22 saves / 26 shots)		**Goalie stats**	Jonas Gustavsson (33 saves / 38 shots)

**Djurgårdens IF won series 4–1**

==== (3) Frölunda HC vs. (6) Malmö Redhawks ====
19 March	Frölunda HC	**1–2**	**Malmö Redhawks**	Scandinavium	Recap
No scoring		**First period**	No scoring
Victor Olofsson 1 – 14:25		**Second period**	12:50 – Lars Bryggman 1; 14:02 – Robin Álvarez 1
No scoring		**Third period**	No scoring
Johan Gustafsson (16 saves / 18 shots)		**Goalie stats**	Oscar Alsenfelt (37 saves / 38 shots)

21 March	Malmö Redhawks	**4–5**	**Frölunda HC**	Malmö Arena	Recap
Erik Forssell 1 – 14:20; Lukas Haudum 1 – 18:13		**First period**	10:28 – Joel Lundqvist 1
No scoring		**Second period**	5:31 – Adam Almqvist 1
Robin Álvarez 2 – 5:24; Rhett Rakhshani 1 – 11:07		**Third period**	11:52 – Sebastian Stålberg 1; 13:09 – Carl Grundström 1; 17:46 – Rasmus Dahlin 1
Oscar Alsenfelt (16 saves / 21 shots)		**Goalie stats**	Johan Gustafsson (29 saves / 33 shots)

23 March	**Frölunda HC**	**2–1**	Malmö Redhawks	Scandinavium	Recap
No scoring		**First period**	19:42 – Johan Olofsson 1
No scoring		**Second period**	No scoring
Carl Grundström 2 – pp – 1:11; Max Friberg 1 – 13:51		**Third period**	No scoring
Johan Gustafsson (24 saves / 25 shots)		**Goalie stats**	Jonas Gunnarsson (23 saves / 25 shots)

25 March	**Malmö Redhawks**	**3–1**	Frölunda HC	Malmö Arena	Recap
Frederik Storm 1 – pp – 0:37; Nils Andersson 1 – pp – 6:22		**First period**	No scoring
No scoring		**Second period**	16:10 – Victor Olofsson 2
Kim Rosdahl 1 – en – 19:36		**Third period**	No scoring
Jonas Gunnarsson (23 saves / 24 shots)		**Goalie stats**	Johan Gustafsson (17 saves / 19 shots)

27 March	Frölunda HC	**0–4**	**Malmö Redhawks**	Scandinavium	Recap
No scoring		**First period**	18:43 – pp – Lukas Haudum 2; 19:36 – Frederik Storm 2
No scoring		**Second period**	No scoring
No scoring		**Third period**	18:42 – en – Axel Wemmenborn 1; 19:44 – sh, en – Erik Forssell 2
Johan Gustafsson (19 saves / 21 shots)		**Goalie stats**	Jonas Gunnarsson (34 saves / 34 shots)

29 March	**Malmö Redhawks**	**4–2**	Frölunda HC	Malmö Arena	Recap
Erik Forssell 3 – pp2 – 4:51; Frederik Storm 3 – pp – 5:29		**First period**	No scoring
Axel Wemmenborn 2 – sh – 1:10		**Second period**	18:38 – Victor Olofsson 3
Johan Olofsson 2 – 6:50		**Third period**	11:52 – Max Friberg 2
Jonas Gunnarsson (25 saves / 27 shots)		**Goalie stats**	Johan Gustafsson (14 saves / 18 shots)

**Malmö Redhawks won series 4–2**

==== (4) Färjestad BK vs. (5) Skellefteå AIK ====
19 March	Färjestad BK	**1–3**	**Skellefteå AIK**	Löfbergs Arena	Recap
No scoring		**First period**	0:45 – Joakim Lindström 1; 8:32 – Oscar Möller 1
Fabian Zetterlund 1 – 13:01		**Second period**	13:58 – Jesper Olofsson 1
No scoring		**Third period**	No scoring
Lars Haugen (23 saves / 26 shots)		**Goalie stats**	Joni Ortio (32 saves / 33 shots)

21 March	**Skellefteå AIK**	**5–0**	Färjestad BK	Skellefteå Kraft Arena	Recap
Joakim Lindström 2 – 10:27; Tim Söderlund 1 – 13:04		**First period**	No scoring
Pontus Petterström 1 – sh – 1:34; Adam Pettersson 1 – 11:15		**Second period**	No scoring
Joakim Lindström 3 – 11:56		**Third period**	No scoring
Joni Ortio (31 saves / 31 shots)		**Goalie stats**	Lars Haugen (18 saves / 22 shots); Stefan Steen (10 saves / 11 shots)

23 March	Färjestad BK	**1–4**	**Skellefteå AIK**	Löfbergs Arena	Recap
No scoring		**First period**	13:54 – Tim Söderlund 2
Joakim Nygård 1 – 13:06		**Second period**	3:07 – sh – Sebastian Ohlsson 1; 5:45 – Jimmie Ericsson 1; 17:21 – pp – Bud Holloway 1
No scoring		**Third period**	No scoring
Stefan Steen (2 saves / 5 shots); Lars Haugen (19 saves / 20 shots)		**Goalie stats**	Joni Ortio (26 saves / 27 shots)

25 March	Skellefteå AIK	**1–3**	**Färjestad BK**	Skellefteå Kraft Arena	Recap
No scoring		**First period**	No scoring
No scoring		**Second period**	6:01 – Ilari Melart 1
Jesper Olofsson 2 – pp – 14:56		**Third period**	4:01 – Dick Axelsson 1; 19:19 – en – Alexander Johansson 1
Joni Ortio (30 saves / 32 shots)		**Goalie stats**	Lars Haugen (30 saves / 31 shots)

27 March	**Färjestad BK**	**3–2**	Skellefteå AIK	Löfbergs Arena	Recap
No scoring		**First period**	16:27 – Michael Kostka 1
Michael Lindqvist 1 – 1:51; Dick Axelsson 2 – 7:38		**Second period**	No scoring
Mikael Wikstrand 1 – pp – 9:30		**Third period**	12:06 – Pär Lindholm 1
Lars Haugen (30 saves / 32 shots)		**Goalie stats**	Joni Ortio (22 saves / 25 shots)

29 March	**Skellefteå AIK**	**5–2**	Färjestad BK	Skellefteå Kraft Arena	Recap
Pontus Petterström 2 – 3:21		**First period**	6:51 – pp – Michael Lindqvist 2; 16:05 – Johan Ryno 1
No scoring		**Second period**	No scoring
Jesper Olofsson 3 – 5:33; Pär Lindholm 2 – 6:23; Oscar Möller 2 – en – 19:12; Pär Lindholm 3 – en – 19:24		**Third period**	No scoring
Joni Ortio (29 saves / 31 shots)		**Goalie stats**	Lars Haugen (46 saves / 49 shots)

**Skellefteå AIK won series 4–2**

=== Semi-finals ===
==== (1) Växjö Lakers vs. (6) Malmö Redhawks ====
2 April	**Växjö Lakers**	**3–2**	Malmö Redhawks	Vida Arena	Recap
Elias Pettersson 2 – 4:44; Joel Persson 1 – 17:02		**First period**	No scoring
No scoring		**Second period**	19:28 – Frederik Storm 4
Dennis Rasmussen 2 – 11:16		**Third period**	9:55 – Frederik Storm 5
Viktor Fasth (18 saves / 20 shots)		**Goalie stats**	Oscar Alsenfelt (28 saves / 31 shots)

4 April	Malmö Redhawks	**0–3**	**Växjö Lakers**	Malmö Arena	Recap
No scoring		**First period**	13:06 – Tuomas Kiiskinen 4
No scoring		**Second period**	No scoring
No scoring		**Third period**	13:49 – Dennis Rasmussen 3; 17:00 – en – Andrew Calof 2
Oscar Alsenfelt (24 saves / 26 shots)		**Goalie stats**	Viktor Fasth (33 saves / 33 shots)

6 April	**Växjö Lakers**	**3–1**	Malmö Redhawks	Vida Arena	Recap
No scoring		**First period**	16:28 – Rhett Rakhshani 2
Andrew Calof 3 – 0:33		**Second period**	No scoring
Elias Pettersson 3 – pp – 0:37; Linus Fröberg 2 – en – 18:52		**Third period**	No scoring
Viktor Fasth (22 saves / 23 shots)		**Goalie stats**	Jonas Gunnarsson (29 saves / 31 shots)

8 April	Malmö Redhawks	1–2	**OT**	**Växjö Lakers**	Malmö Arena	Recap
Nils Andersson 2 – pp2 – 11:27		First period		9:22 – pp – Dennis Rasmussen 4
No scoring		Second period		No scoring
No scoring		Third period		No scoring
No scoring		First overtime period		9:55 – pp – Elias Pettersson 4
Jonas Gunnarsson (28 saves / 30 shots)		Goalie stats		Viktor Fasth (12 saves / 13 shots); Viktor Andrén (9 saves / 9 shots)

**Växjö Lakers won series 4–0**

==== (2) Djurgårdens IF vs. (5) Skellefteå AIK ====
3 April	Djurgårdens IF	3–4	**OT**	**Skellefteå AIK**	Hovet	Recap
Markus Ljungh 3 – 8:28; Jonathan Davidsson 3 – 17:10		First period		No scoring
No scoring		Second period		9:26 – Jimmie Ericsson 2
Linus Hultström 4 – 18:14		Third period		3:46 – Pär Lindholm 4; 15:16 – pp – Oscar Möller 3
No scoring		First overtime period		10:12 – Jimmie Ericsson 3
Adam Reideborn (23 saves / 27 shots)		Goalie stats		Joni Ortio (28 saves / 31 shots)

5 April	**Skellefteå AIK**	**6–1**	Djurgårdens IF	Skellefteå Kraft Arena	Recap
No scoring		**First period**	No scoring
Sebastian Ohlsson 2 – sh – 11:09		**Second period**	No scoring
Henrik Hetta 1 – 4:58; Oscar Möller 4 – pp – 15:05; Sebastian Ohlsson 3 – 15:43; Pär Lindholm 5 – en – 16:24; Bud Holloway 2 – 16:52		**Third period**	13:36 – sh – Patrik Lundh 1
Joni Ortio (33 saves / 34 shots)		**Goalie stats**	Adam Reideborn (27 saves / 32 shots)

7 April	**Djurgårdens IF**	**3–1**	Skellefteå AIK	Hovet	Recap
No scoring		**First period**	No scoring
Linus Johansson 2 – pp – 11:20; Markus Ljungh 4 – pp2 – 19:42		**Second period**	No scoring
Niclas Bergfors 2 – pp – 0:43		**Third period**	16:04 – Jesper Olofsson 4
Adam Reideborn (21 saves / 22 shots)		**Goalie stats**	Gustaf Lindvall (28 saves / 31 shots); Joni Ortio (2 saves / 2 shots)

9 April	**Skellefteå AIK**	3–2	**OT**	Djurgårdens IF	Skellefteå Kraft Arena	Recap
No scoring		First period		No scoring
No scoring		Second period		4:05 – Mikael Ahlén 3; 18:58 – Jonathan Davidsson 4
Oscar Möller 5 – 8:46; Henrik Hetta 2 – 17:37		Third period		No scoring
Pontus Petterström 3 – 6:24		First overtime period		No scoring
Joni Ortio (32 saves / 34 shots)		Goalie stats		Adam Reideborn (31 saves / 34 shots)

11 April*	**Djurgårdens IF**	**2–1**	Skellefteå AIK	Hovet	Recap
No scoring		**First period**	No scoring
No scoring		**Second period**	17:15 – Tim Söderlund 3
Linus Hultström 5 – 11:22; Patrik Lundh 2 – 16:01		**Third period**	No scoring
Adam Reideborn (29 saves / 30 shots)		**Goalie stats**	Joni Ortio (22 saves / 24 shots)

13 April	**Skellefteå AIK**	**6–2**	Djurgårdens IF	Skellefteå Kraft Arena	Recap
No scoring		**First period**	No scoring
Jimmie Ericsson 4 – pp – 5:58; Oscar Möller 6 – pp – 9:22; Oscar Möller 7 – 11:17; Tim Söderlund 4 – 13:30		**Second period**	No scoring
Pär Lindholm 6 – en – 17:01; Sebastian Ohlsson 4 – en – 17:59		**Third period**	8:53 – Axel Jonsson Fjällby 6; 11:12 – Daniel Brodin 1
Joni Ortio (44 saves / 46 shots)		**Goalie stats**	Adam Reideborn (25 saves / 29 shots)

**Skellefteå AIK won series 4–2**

- Note: Game 5 was played at the Ericsson Globe.

=== Finals ===
==== (1) Växjö Lakers vs. (5) Skellefteå AIK ====
17 April	**Växjö Lakers**	**7–0**	Skellefteå AIK	Vida Arena	Recap
Brendan Shinnimin 2 – 8:10; Liam Reddox 2 – 9:34		**First period**	No scoring
Robert Rosén 4 – 7:52; Elias Pettersson 5 – pp – 9:07		**Second period**	No scoring
Andrew Calof 4 – pp – 8:17; Robert Rosén 5 – pp – 13:10; Daniel Rahimi 1 – 17:56		**Third period**	No scoring
Viktor Andrén (22 saves / 22 shots)		**Goalie stats**	Joni Ortio (26 saves / 33 shots)

19 April	Skellefteå AIK	**0–4**	**Växjö Lakers**	Skellefteå Kraft Arena	Recap
No scoring		**First period**	13:27 – Daniel Rahimi 2; 16:09 – Elias Pettersson 6
No scoring		**Second period**	No scoring
No scoring		**Third period**	0:14 – Robert Rosén 6; 4:38 – Robert Rosén 7
Joni Ortio (38 saves / 42 shots)		**Goalie stats**	Viktor Andrén (28 saves / 28 shots)

21 April	**Växjö Lakers**	**4–1**	Skellefteå AIK	Vida Arena	Recap
No scoring		**First period**	No scoring
Oliver Bohm 2 – 17:23; Elias Pettersson 7 – 18:21		**Second period**	13:08 – Oscar Möller 8
Andrew Calof 5 – 8:49; Elias Pettersson 8 – en – 17:36		**Third period**	No scoring
Viktor Andrén (19 saves / 20 shots)		**Goalie stats**	Joni Ortio (19 saves / 22 shots)

22 April	Skellefteå AIK	**0–5**	**Växjö Lakers**	Skellefteå Kraft Arena	Recap
No scoring		**First period**	No scoring
No scoring		**Second period**	4:56 – Elias Pettersson 9; 6:35 – Elias Pettersson 10; 18:44 – pp – Janne Pesonen 3
No scoring		**Third period**	2:17 – Robert Rosén 8; 11:08 – Eric Martinsson 3
Joni Ortio (31 saves / 36 shots)		**Goalie stats**	Viktor Andrén (31 saves / 31 shots)

**Växjö Lakers won series 4–0**

=== Statistics ===
==== Playoff scoring leaders ====
List shows the ten best skaters based on the number of points during the playoffs. If two or more skaters are tied (i.e. same number of points, goals and played games), all of the tied skaters are shown. Updated as of April 22, 2018.
GP = Games played; G = Goals; A = Assists; Pts = Points; +/– = Plus/minus; PIM = Penalty minutes

Player	Team	GP	G	A	Pts	+/–	PIM
(Sweden) Elias Pettersson	Växjö Lakers	13	10	9	19	+17	4
(Sweden) Robert Rosén	Växjö Lakers	10	8	6	14	+16	6
(Sweden) Oscar Möller	Skellefteå AIK	16	8	5	13	+5	6
(Sweden) Pär Lindholm	Skellefteå AIK	16	6	5	11	+2	16
(Sweden) Markus Ljungh	Djurgårdens IF	11	4	7	11	+4	4
(Sweden) Eric Martinsson	Växjö Lakers	13	3	8	11	+15	18
(Finland) Tuomas Kiiskinen	Växjö Lakers	13	4	6	10	+16	6
(Sweden) Patrik Lundh	Djurgårdens IF	11	2	8	10	+4	2
(Canada) Brendan Shinnimin	Växjö Lakers	13	2	8	10	+5	30
(Sweden) Jonathan Pudas	Skellefteå AIK	16	0	10	10	+1	8

==== Playoff leading goaltenders ====
These are the leaders in GAA and save percentage among goaltenders who played at least 40% of the team's minutes. The table is sorted by GAA, and the criteria for inclusion are bolded. Updated as of April 22, 2018.

GP = Games played; TOI = Time on ice (minutes); GA = Goals against; SO = Shutouts; Sv% = Save percentage; GAA = Goals against average

Player	Team	GP	TOI	GA	SO	Sv%	GAA
(Sweden) Viktor Fasth	Växjö Lakers	9	502:45	12	3	**93.41**	**1.43**
(Sweden) Jonas Gunnarsson	Malmö Redhawks	6	368:16	9	1	**94.74**	**1.47**
(Finland) Joni Ortio	Skellefteå AIK	14	911:30	38	1	**92.13**	**2.50**
(Sweden) Johan Gustafsson	Frölunda HC	6	353:24	15	0	88.81	**2.55**
(Sweden) Adam Reideborn	Djurgårdens IF	10	663:01	29	0	89.61	**2.62**
(Sweden) Jonas Gustavsson	Linköpings HC	5	317:17	14	0	**91.86**	2.65
(Norway) Lars Haugen	Färjestad BK	6	300:28	14	0	**92.22**	2.80

== SHL awards ==
Guldhjälmen: Joakim Lindström, Skellefteå AIK
Guldpucken: William Karlsson, Vegas Golden Knights
Honken Trophy: Viktor Fasth, Växjö Lakers
Håkan Loob Trophy: Victor Olofsson, Frölunda HC
Rookie of the Year: Elias Pettersson, Växjö Lakers
Salming Trophy: Lawrence Pilut, HV71
Stefan Liv Memorial Trophy: Elias Pettersson, Växjö Lakers
Guldpipan: Mikael Nord
