= Captain (ice hockey) =

Member of an ice hockey team recognized for their leadership

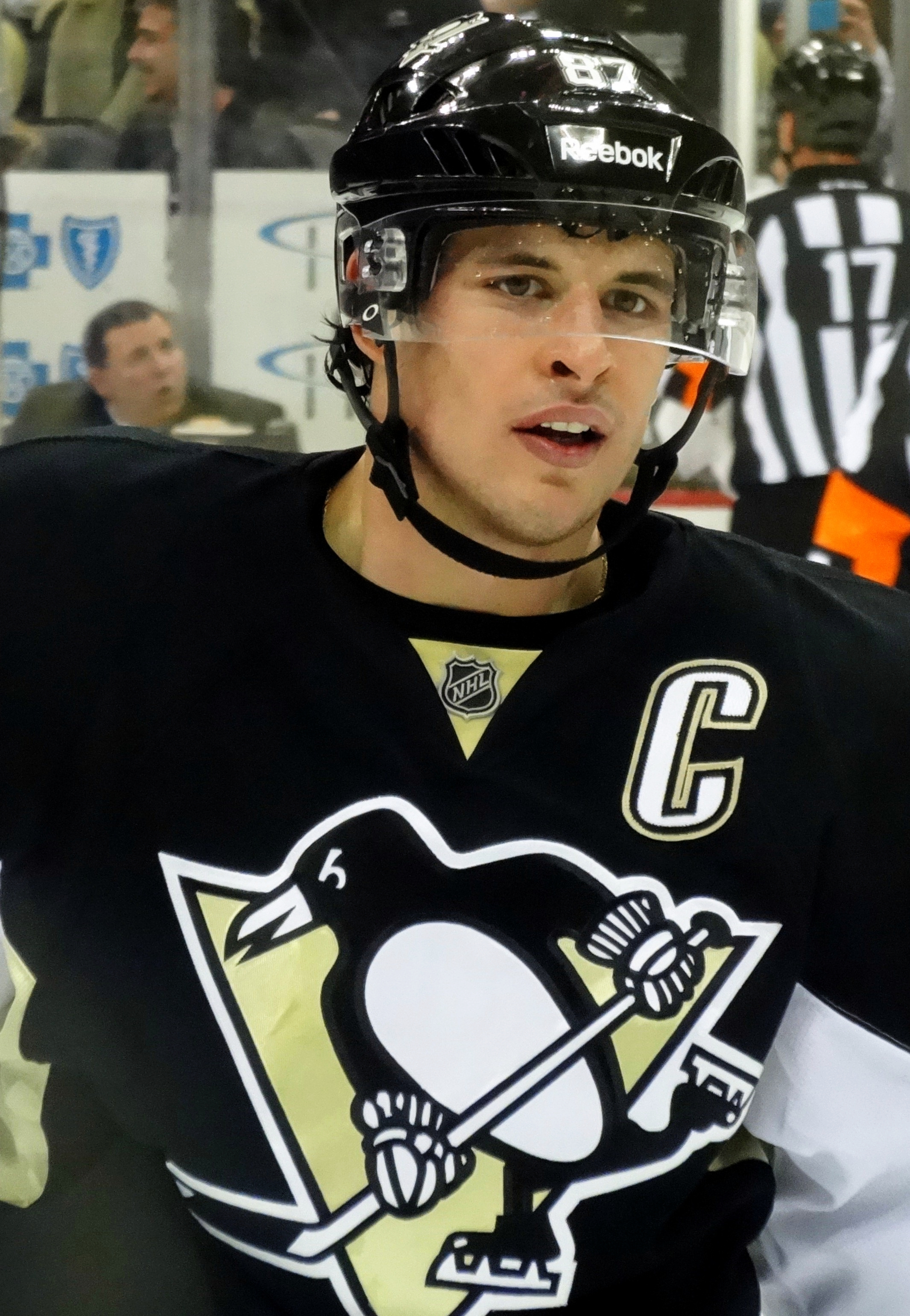
Sidney Crosby, the longest-tenured captain in NHL history, wearing the "C" as captain of the Pittsburgh Penguins

In ice hockey, the captain is the player designated by a team as the only person authorized to speak with the game officials regarding rule interpretations when the captain is on the ice. At most levels of play each team must designate one captain and a number of alternate captains (usually two or three) who speak to the officials when the captain is on the bench. Captains wear a "C" on their sweaters, while alternate captains wear an "A".

Officially captains have no other responsibility or authority, although they may, depending on the league or individual team, have various informal duties, such as participation in pre-game ceremonies or other events outside the game. As with most team sports that designate captains, the captain is usually a well-respected player and a team leader.

== Responsibilities and importance ==
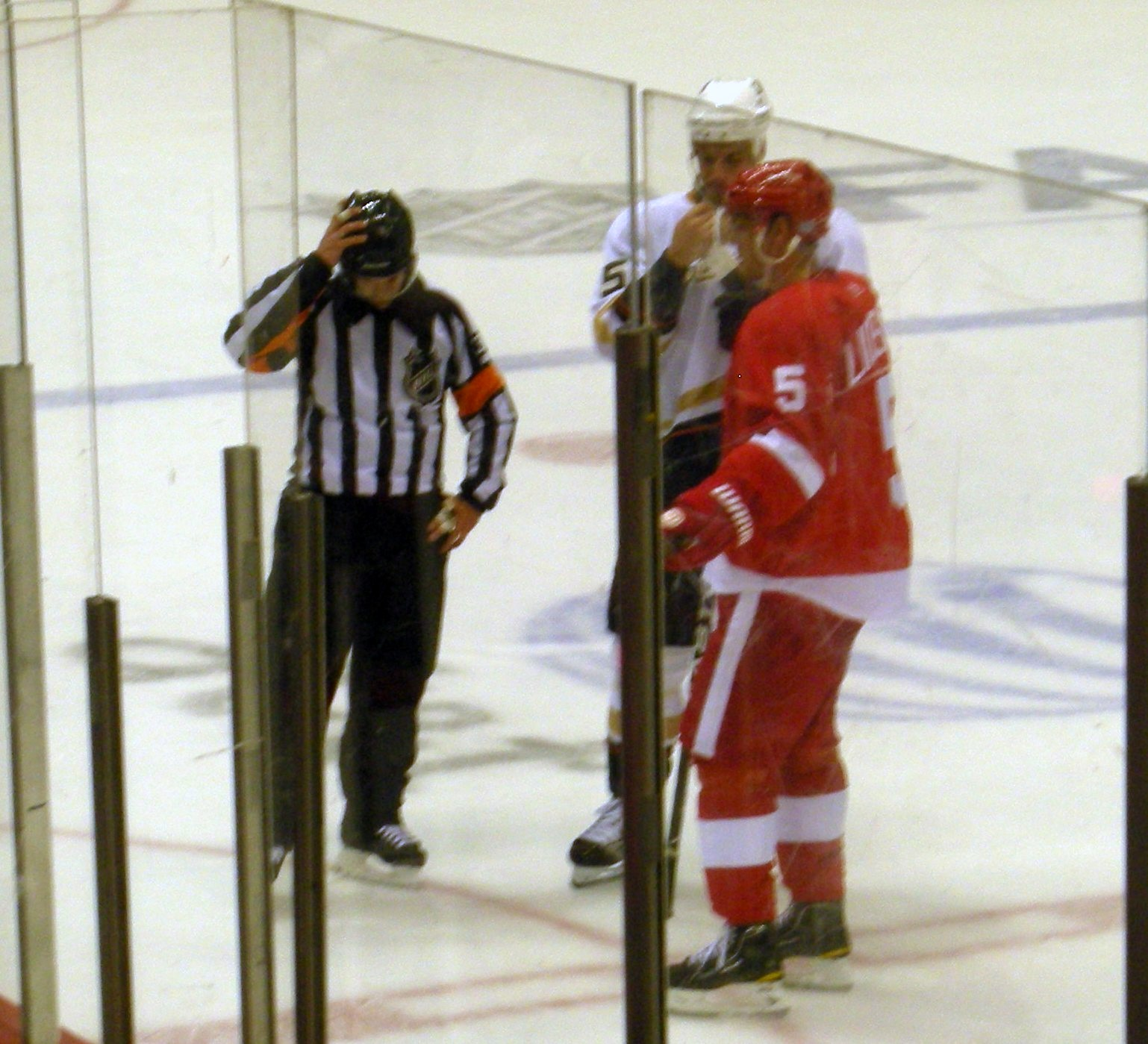
Captains Nicklas Lidstrom of the Detroit Red Wings (right) and Ryan Getzlaf of the Anaheim Ducks (middle) talk with a referee in October 2010

According to International Ice Hockey Federation (IIHF) and National Hockey League (NHL) rules, the only player allowed to speak with referees about rule interpretations is the captain, or, if the captain is not on the ice, an alternate captain.

Although the rules do not specify any other distinction between the captain and their teammates, the captain has numerous responsibilities to the team, particularly in North American professional hockey. The captain is a dressing room leader, and also represents the players' concerns to management.

The captain is often considered the primary representative of the team to the public, and sometimes responsible for organizing the team's social functions and performing ceremonial on-ice functions; award presentations or ceremonial faceoffs.

== Selection ==
NHL teams do not need to designate the same player as captain from game to game, but most teams do. When Boston Bruins captain Terry O'Reilly retired, Ray Bourque and Rick Middleton were named as co-captains of the team for the 1985–86 season. Middleton wore the "C" during home games and Bourque for road games during the season's first half, and the two switched for the second half. This arrangement continued until Middleton retired in 1988 and Bourque became the sole captain. Some teams name two (such as the Buffalo Sabres during the 2005–06 and 2006–07 NHL seasons) or three (such as the Vancouver Canucks during the 1990–91 season) captains for a season. Some teams rotate captains rather than keep one for an extended period of time (the Minnesota Wild rotated captaincy every one or two months until the 2009–10 season, when Mikko Koivu was named the first permanent captain since the franchise's inception). During each NHL game, however, only one player can officially be designated as captain.

Captains are usually veteran players, though on occasion younger players are chosen. The selection is often seen as an important moment for a team, and one that can affect the team's (and newly appointed captain's) performance. Captains are selected by different means: in some instances, teams have held votes among their players to choose a team captain, while on other occasions, the choice was made by team management. Captains are often chosen due to their seniority in the game and years of service with their current club. However, franchise players—current or emerging stars—have also been named captains. Though not required, many captains have previously served as alternate captains of their team. Some selections or removals of NHL captaincies have been controversial, more so than the other North American professional sports leagues. For instance, in Canada men's national ice hockey team, then-General Manager Bobby Clarke selected Eric Lindros for the 1998 Winter Olympics, considered somewhat controversial as Lindros was chosen over longer-tenured NHL captains such as Steve Yzerman, Ray Bourque and Wayne Gretzky, Clarke was also general manager of the Philadelphia Flyers whom Lindros played for professionally. In 2000, when the relationship between Clarke and Lindros deteriorated during contentious contract negotiations and the team's handling of Lindros' injuries, the team captaincy was issued to Eric Desjardins. Tampa Bay Lightning head coach John Tortorella stripped the captaincy from Vincent Lecavalier after disagreements about the player's skills and conditioning practices. In 1980, Darryl Sittler angrily resigned the captaincy by cutting off the "C" from his Toronto Maple Leafs jersey with scissors in protest of Harold Ballard's trade of Sittler's best friend, Lanny McDonald. Ballard likened Sittler's actions to flag burning.

The rules of the IIHF, NHL and Hockey Canada do not permit goaltenders to be designated as on-ice captains, due to the logistical challenge of having the goaltender relay rules discussions between referees and coaches and then return to the crease. The NHL introduced a rule prohibiting the goaltender from being a captain following the 1947–48 season (see § Goaltender captains below).

== Alternate captains ==
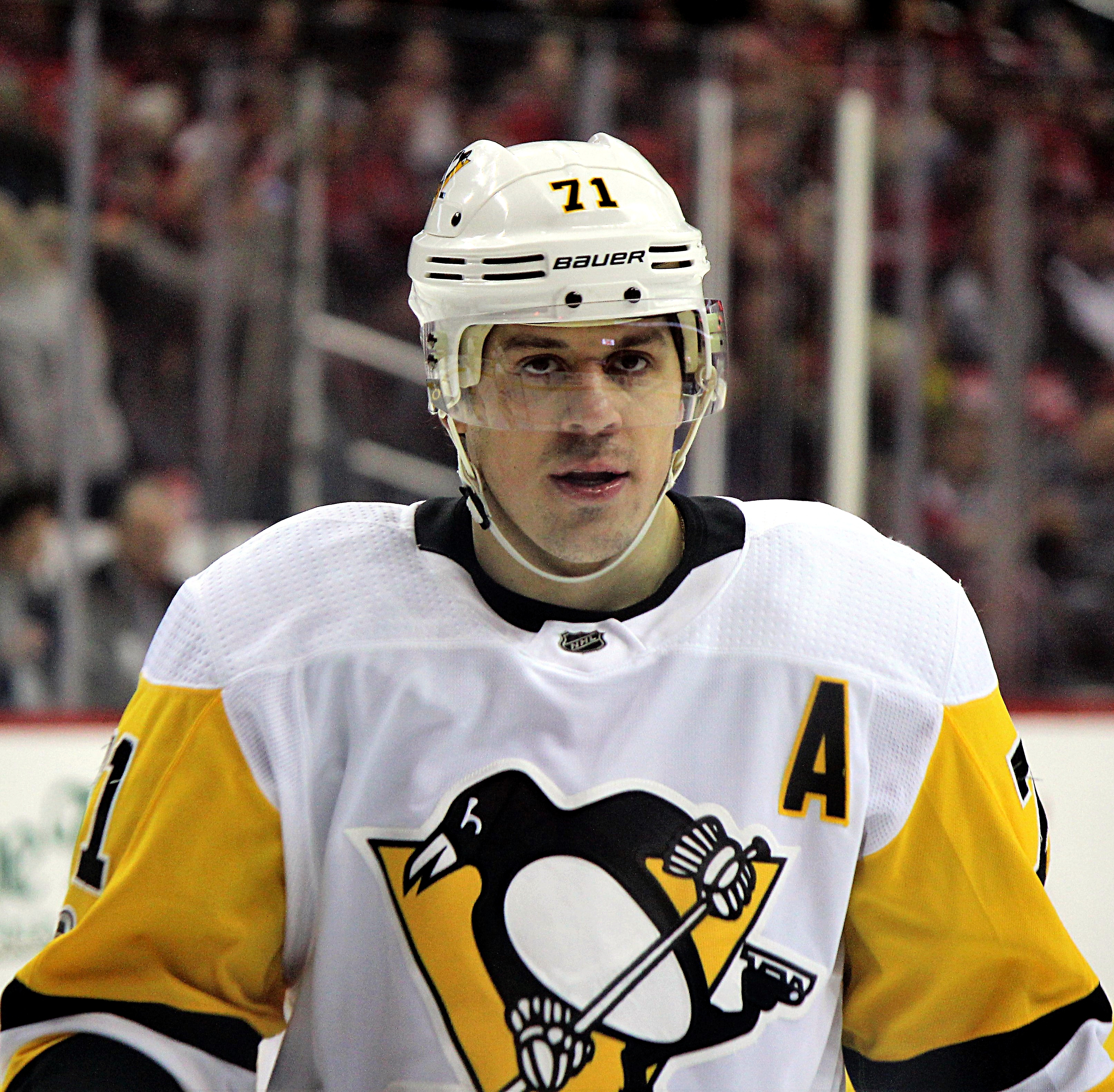
Evgeni Malkin in November 2017: the "A" is commonly on the left side of the jersey (from wearer's perspective)

Teams may designate alternate captains (often erroneously called "assistant captains"). Alternate captains wear the letter "A" on their jerseys in the same manner that team captains wear the "C".

In the NHL, teams may appoint a captain and up to two alternate captains, or they may appoint three alternate captains and thus no captain. A team with a player-coach may also have no captain or alternate captains. A team commonly has three alternate captains when the team has not selected a captain, or when the serving captain is injured and misses a game. In the National Hockey League, it is common for a team to have three alternate captains if no one is assigned captain, the current captain is absent, or a goaltender is named as the captain. International and USA amateur rules do not allow this; they stipulate that "each team must appoint a captain and not more than two alternate captains" In the Ontario Hockey League (OHL), Quebec Maritimes Junior Hockey League (QMJHL), Western Hockey League (WHL) and minor leagues under the jurisdiction of Hockey Canada, teams are allowed to have a captain with up to three alternate captains. If the team chooses to not appoint a captain, they are not permitted to appoint a fourth alternate captain. When the captain is off the ice or unavailable for the game, any alternate captain on the ice is responsible for fulfilling the captain's official role as liaison to the referees.

NHL teams may choose alternate captains from game to game or appoint regular alternate captains for the season. In North America, alternate captains perform many of the same leadership and team building roles as the captain. In the 1969–70 season, the Boston Bruins had three alternate captains (Johnny Bucyk, Phil Esposito and Ed Westfall) instead of a captain sporting the "C". However, as Bucyk was the most senior of the alternate captains, he was the first Bruins player to be presented the Stanley Cup when the team won the Stanley Cup Final in 1970 and 1972.

In the NCAA, a team can designate a single alternate captain to assume the role of captain should the captain be unavailable due to injury or penalty.

== Designation on uniform ==
The letter "C" or "A" is attached to the jersey of the team's captain and alternate captains (commonly sewn at higher levels of play, though removable insignia exist so the "C" or "A" designation can be easily changed). The designation is traditionally placed on the left side of the sweater, though the IIHF, NHL and NCAA rules specify only that it must be in a "conspicuous location on the front" of the player's sweater. Four teams in the history of the NHL have worn sweaters where the positioning of the crest on the front leaves insufficient space on the left for the letter: the Carolina Hurricanes, New Jersey Devils, and the inactive Arizona Coyotes each have had alternate jerseys with the letters placed on the right, while the Detroit Red Wings' primary jerseys used that placement for much of their history. Since the 2016–17 NHL season, the Florida Panthers have included an arched bar patch reading "Captain" or "Alternate" above the jersey's left sleeve patch, in addition to the letter on the front of the jersey, for their captains.

In the World Hockey Association's final season of 1978-79, Paul Shmyr, the captain of the Edmonton Oilers, wore a "K" (for kapitan) on his sweater instead of a "C", as a salute to both his personal, and the city of Edmonton's, Ukrainian heritage.

== NHL captains ==
=== Records ===
Sidney Crosby has served as captain of the Pittsburgh Penguins for 20 seasons (2007–08 to the present), the longest term in NHL history by seasons, while Steve Yzerman served as the captain of the Detroit Red Wings for 1,303 games over 19 seasons (1986–87 to 2005–06), the longest term by games. The Boston Bruins' Ray Bourque was previously the longest-tenured captain in NHL history from 1985–86 to 1999–00, being co-captain for the first three seasons. Daniel Alfredsson holds the record as the longest-serving European captain serving for 14 years/13 seasons (1999–00 to 2012–13) as captain of the Ottawa Senators. Alfredsson's record was tied by Zdeno Chara, who served as the captain of the Boston Bruins also for 14 seasons between 2006–07 and 2019–20. Brian Bellows was the youngest captain in NHL history, serving as the interim captain of the Minnesota North Stars from January to May 1984, during Craig Hartsburg's absence from the lineup, due to injury. The youngest permanent NHL captain in history is Connor McDavid, announced as captain by the Edmonton Oilers on October 5, 2016, at the age of 19 years and 266 days.

Player is still active as captain of their team.

Youngest NHL captains
Name	Team	Birth date	Captaincy announced	Age at announcement	First game as captain	Age at first game	Type
Brian Bellows	Minnesota North Stars	September 1, 1964	January 10, 1984 (Note: An exact date for Brian Bellows' interim captaincy has not yet been determined. The North Stars captain, Craig Hartsburg, was injured on January 3, 1984, and Bellows became interim captain shortly thereafter in January 1984.)	19 years, 131 days			Interim
Connor McDavid	Edmonton Oilers	January 13, 1997	October 5, 2016	19 years, 266 days	October 12, 2016	19 years, 273 days	Permanent
Gabriel Landeskog	Colorado Avalanche	November 23, 1992	September 4, 2012	19 years, 286 days	January 19, 2013	20 years, 57 days	Permanent
Sidney Crosby	Pittsburgh Penguins	August 7, 1987	May 31, 2007	19 years, 297 days	October 5, 2007	20 years, 59 days	Permanent
Vincent Lecavalier	Tampa Bay Lightning	April 21, 1980	March 1, 2000	19 years, 315 days	March 1, 2000	19 years, 315 days	Permanent
Jonathan Toews	Chicago Blackhawks	April 29, 1988	July 18, 2008	20 years, 80 days	October 10, 2008	20 years, 164 days	Permanent
Macklin Celebrini	San Jose Sharks	June 13, 2006	September 25, 2026	20 years, 104 days	October 1, 2026	20 years, 110 days	Permanent
Connor Bedard	Chicago Blackhawks	July 17, 2005	September 15, 2026	21 years, 60 days	October 13, 2026 (Note: Bedard missed the first two weeks of the 2026–27 season due to a shoulder injury.)	21 years, 88 days	Permanent
Steve Yzerman	Detroit Red Wings	May 9, 1965	October 7, 1986	21 years, 151 days	October 9, 1986	21 years, 153 days	Permanent
Jim Schoenfeld	Buffalo Sabres	September 4, 1952	September 1, 1974	21 years, 362 days	October 14, 1974	22 years, 40 days	Permanent

=== Stanley Cup Finals ===
Jean Beliveau is the only player to have captained his team to win five Stanley Cup championships, doing so with the Montreal Canadiens between 1961 and 1971. The following captains all won four, three of them in consecutive years: Maurice Richard (1957–1960) with the Canadiens, George Armstrong with the Toronto Maple Leafs, Yvan Cournoyer (1976–1979) with the Canadiens, Denis Potvin (1980–1983) with the New York Islanders and Wayne Gretzky with the Edmonton Oilers. Dunc Munro was the first NHL captain born in Europe to lead his team to a Stanley Cup title (1926), and Charlie Gardiner was the first to accomplish the same feat in the post-WHL era (1934). Both Munro and Gardiner were born in Scotland. Derian Hatcher became the first American-born captain to win the Stanley Cup in 1999. Daniel Alfredsson was the first European-born and trained captain to lead an NHL team to the Stanley Cup Final (2007), while Nicklas Lidstrom was the first captain born and trained in Europe to lead an NHL team to a Stanley Cup title (2008). Aleksander "Sasha" Barkov became the first Finnish-born captain to lift the Stanley Cup (2024), and then made history again by leading his team to consecutive championships (2025). Mark Messier was the first NHL player to win the Stanley Cup as captain of two different teams: the Edmonton Oilers in 1990 and the New York Rangers in 1994. Sidney Crosby became the youngest captain in the NHL to win the Stanley Cup in 2009 at 21 years 10 months. The youngest captain to lead his team to the Stanley Cup in the history of the trophy is Mike Grant of the 1895 Montreal Victorias, who was 21 years and 2 months at the time.

=== Minority captains ===
Dirk Graham became the first NHL captain of African descent when he was named captain of the Chicago Blackhawks in March 1989. Jarome Iginla, who became captain of the Calgary Flames in 2003, has been cited by ESPN as the first black captain in NHL history. Bryce Salvador, who is of African and Brazilian descent, captained the New Jersey Devils from 2013 to 2015. Kyle Okposo was captain of the Buffalo Sabres from 2022 to 2024.

Paul Kariya became the first NHL captain of Asian descent when he was named captain of the Mighty Ducks of Anaheim during the 1996-97 season. Nick Suzuki was named captain of the Montreal Canadiens in 2022, becoming the second.

Bill Guerin became the first NHL captain of Latin American descent when he was named captain of the New York Islanders in July 2007. He is also regarded as the first NHL player of Hispanic heritage. Max Pacioretty captained the Montreal Canadiens from 2015 to 2018. Auston Matthews was named captain of the Toronto Maple Leafs in 2024.

=== Goaltender captains ===
In NHL history, there have been six goaltenders who served as official team captains:

- John Ross Roach (Toronto St. Patricks): 1924–25 season
- George Hainsworth (Montreal Canadiens): 1932–33 season
- Roy Worters (New York Americans): 1932–33 season
- Alex Connell (Ottawa Senators): 1932–33 season
- Charlie Gardiner (Chicago Black Hawks): 1933–34 season
- Bill Durnan (Montreal Canadiens): latter half of 1947–48 season

Prior to the 1948–49 season, the NHL made a change to the rules, prohibiting goaltenders from being captains or alternate captains. This was in response to complaints from opponents of the Montreal Canadiens, who complained that Durnan left his crease to argue with the referee at strategic points during games, resulting in unscheduled timeouts. This rule is sometimes referred to as the "Durnan Rule."

Although the Canucks appointed goaltender Roberto Luongo as team captain for the 2008–09 and 2009–10 seasons, since he could not be his team's official captain during games, Willie Mitchell was the on-ice captain, serving as liaison to the officials, and Henrik Sedin and Mattias Ohlund performed ceremonial aspects of the position such as pre-game faceoffs.

== See also ==
- List of current AHL captains
- List of current SHL captains and alternate captains
- List of Team Canada captains
