= Mikael Ahlén =

Swedish ice hockey player

- Born: April 14, 1988 (age 37) Salem, Sweden
- Height: 6 ft 1 in (185 cm)
- Weight: 203 lb (92 kg; 14 st 7 lb)
- Position: Right wing
- Shot: Right
- Played for: Djurgårdens IF
- NHL draft: Undrafted
- Playing career: 2007–2019

Mikael Ahlén (born April 14, 1988) is a Swedish former professional ice hockey player. He played with Djurgårdens IF Hockey in the Swedish Hockey League (SHL).

Ahlén made his Elitserien debut playing with Djurgårdens IF Hockey during the 2006–07 Elitserien season. Following a single season with Södertälje SK of the HockeyAllsvenskan in 2018–19, Ahlén announced his retirement from hockey after 12 professional seasons.

== Career statistics ==
			Regular season					Playoffs
Season	Team	League	GP	G	A	Pts	PIM	GP	G	A	Pts	PIM
2003–04	Djurgårdens IF U16		—	—	—	—	—	—	—	—	—	—
2004–05	Djurgårdens IF J18	J18 Elit	15	10	3	13	35	—	—	—	—	—
2004–05	Djurgårdens IF J18	J18 Allsvenskan	7	3	3	6	10	—	—	—	—	—
2004–05	Djurgårdens IF J20	J20 SuperElit	3	0	1	1	0	—	—	—	—	—
2005–06	Djurgårdens IF J18	J18 Elit	1	0	2	2	0	—	—	—	—	—
2005–06	Djurgårdens IF J18	J18 Allsvenskan	1	0	2	2	0	2	0	0	0	0
2005–06	Djurgårdens IF J20	J20 SuperElit	37	7	4	11	122	4	2	1	3	6
2006–07	Djurgårdens IF J20	J20 SuperElit	35	10	8	18	92	7	2	0	2	6
2006–07	Djurgårdens IF	Elitserien	1	0	0	0	0	—	—	—	—	—
2007–08	Medicine Hat Tigers	WHL	34	8	3	11	20	5	1	0	1	2
2008–09	Djurgårdens IF J20	J20 SuperElit	16	3	2	5	51	—	—	—	—	—
2008–09	Djurgårdens IF	Elitserien	25	1	2	3	29	—	—	—	—	—
2008–09	Visby/Roma HK	Division 1	2	1	0	1	27	—	—	—	—	—
2008–09	Huddinge IK	HockeyAllsvenskan	5	2	0	2	2	9	0	2	2	2
2009–10	Nybro Vikings	Division 1	37	18	11	29	36	10	2	5	7	29
2010–11	IF Troja-Ljungby	HockeyAllsvenskan	52	17	14	31	38	10	4	6	10	8
2011–12	IF Troja-Ljungby	HockeyAllsvenskan	44	11	11	22	126	—	—	—	—	—
2012–13	IF Troja-Ljungby	HockeyAllsvenskan	45	2	12	14	57	—	—	—	—	—
2013–14	Djurgårdens IF	HockeyAllsvenskan	43	6	8	14	22	10	0	0	0	2
2014–15	Djurgårdens IF	SHL	54	5	8	13	65	2	0	0	0	0
2015–16	Djurgårdens IF	SHL	46	3	4	7	56	8	0	0	0	4
2016–17	Djurgårdens IF	SHL	49	8	7	15	20	3	0	0	0	2
2017–18	Djurgårdens IF	SHL	50	4	3	7	45	11	3	1	4	6
2018–19	Södertälje SK	HockeyAllsvenskan	48	5	8	13	14	—	—	—	—	—
2023–24	IFK Salem	Division 4	2	1	0	1	4	—	—	—	—	—
Elitserien/SHL totals			225	21	24	45	215	24	3	1	4	12
HockeyAllsvenskan totals			237	43	53	96	259	29	4	8	12	12
