= Robert Rosén =

Swedish ice hockey player

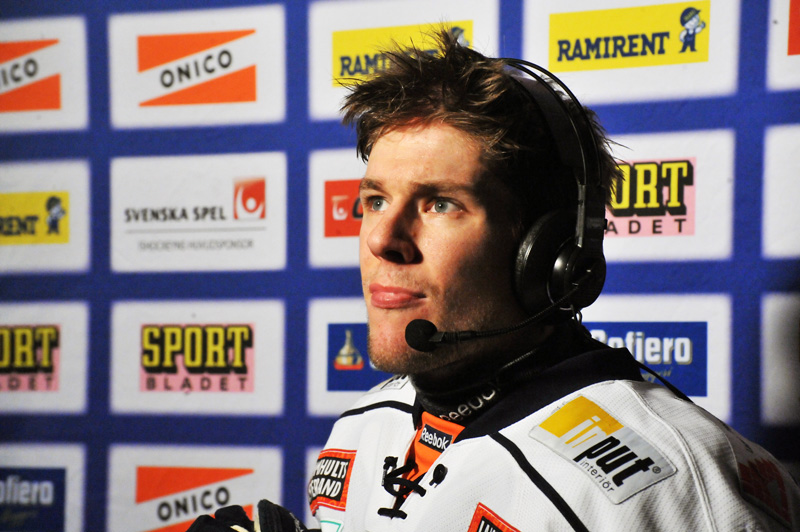
- Born: 25 June 1987 (age 38); Alvesta, Sweden
- Height: 180 cm (5 ft 11 in)
- Weight: 80 kg (176 lb; 12 st 8 lb)
- Position: Centre
- Shot: Right
- Played for: Växjö Lakers; Modo Hockey; AIK; HC Sochi
- National team: Sweden
- Playing career: 2003–2025

Robert Rosén (born 25 June 1987) is a Swedish former professional ice hockey centre who last played for the Växjö Lakers in the Swedish Hockey League (SHL).

== Playing career ==
Rosén started his professional career in 2003 with the Division 2 team Alvesta SK, and played there for two seasons. Rosén then went to Växjö Lakers of the HockeyAllsvenskan where he had great success, scoring a total of 176 points in 211 games. Rosén then signed with Modo Hockey to make his Elitserien debut in the 2010–11 season. His 2010–11 season with Modo ended with 27 points in 65 games.

After that season, which ended in play in the Kvalserien qualification for the team to stay in Elitserien, Rosén signed with AIK of the same league. He totalled a career high of 60 points (21 goals, 39 assists) in 55 games, and won the scoring league as a result. In May 2012, due to real-life issues, Rosén moved back to Växjö and signed a five-year contract with Växjö Lakers within the same league. The contract will expire after the 2016–17 season. Rosén's move was very controversial among AIK fans, and as a result, his contract included a clause prohibiting him from playing the first two road games against AIK at Hovet in the 2012–13 season. The only road game against AIK in which Rosén appeared was played on February 26, 2013; the game ended 4–1 in AIK's favour.

Playing in eight straight seasons in the SHL, and capturing the Le Mat Trophy twice, Rosén embarked on a new challenge, agreeing to a one-year contract with Russian club, HC Sochi of the KHL, on 3 May 2018. In the 2019–20 season, Rosén quickly adapted to the Russian game, registering 10 goals and 24 points through 57 regular season games, however was unable to help Sochi progress to the post-season.

As a free agent from Sochi, Rosén opted to return to Sweden and rejoin the Växjö Lakers of the SHL on a three-year deal on 15 May 2020.

== Awards and honours ==
Award	Year
SHL
Le Mat Trophy (Växjö Lakers)	2015, 2018, 2021, 2023
