= Jesper Olofsson =

Swedish professional ice hockey player (born 1993)

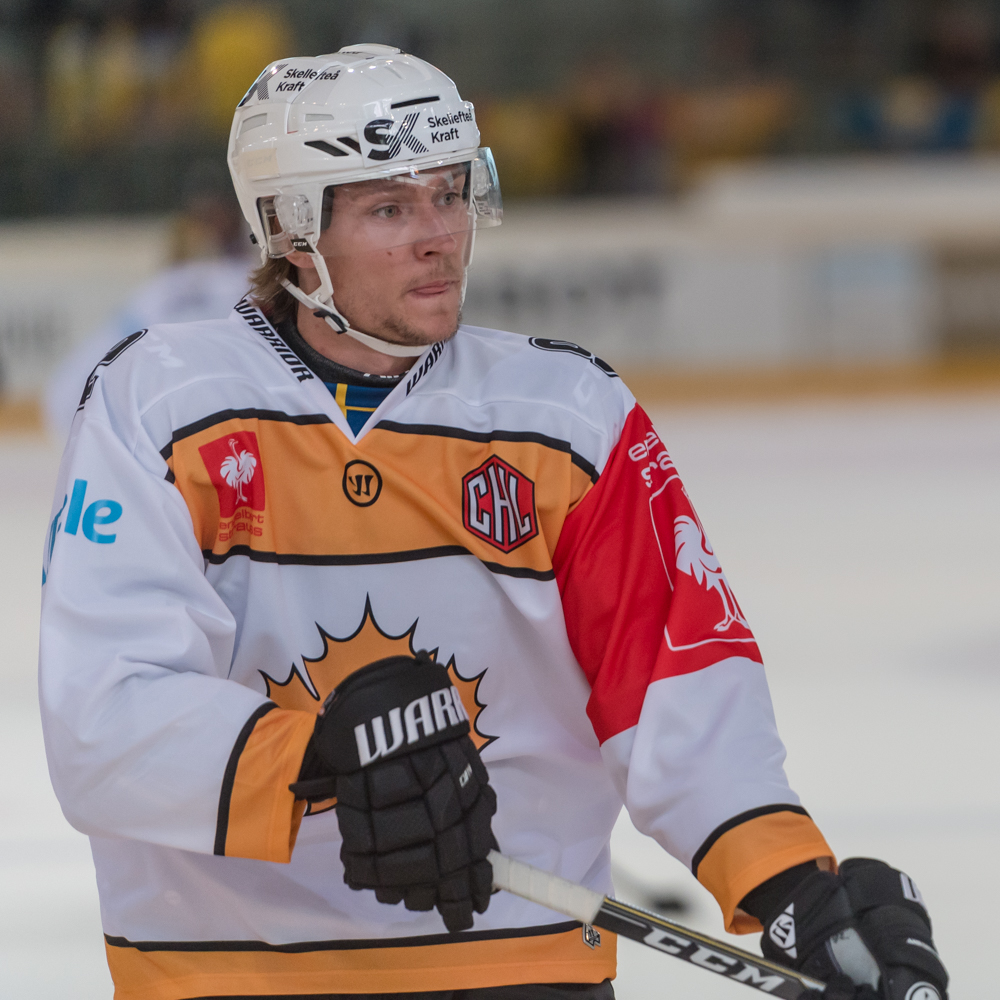
- Olofsson with Skellefteå AIK in 2016
- Born: November 26, 1993 (age 32) Örnsköldsvik, Sweden
- Height: 5 ft 10 in (178 cm)
- Weight: 172 lb (78 kg; 12 st 4 lb)
- Position: Left wing
- Shoots: Left
- Allsv team Former teams: MoDo Hockey; Odense Bulldogs; Karlskrona HK; Skellefteå AIK; Färjestad BK; SC Bern; SCL Tigers; EHC Biel
- NHL draft: Undrafted
- Playing career: 2010–present

Jesper Olofsson (born November 26, 1993) is a Swedish professional ice hockey player currently playing with MoDo Hockey of the HockeyAllsvenskan (Allsv). He is the older brother of left winger Victor Olofsson.

== Playing career ==
A native of Örnsköldsvik, Olofsson played in the youth system of Modo Hockey and made his debut for the club's men's team in the SHL during the 2010–11 Elitserien season. After spending the 2012–13 campaign with the Odense Bulldogs in Denmark, he returned to his native Sweden, joining second-division team Almtuna IS for the 2013–14 season. After one year, Olofsson moved on to another Allsvenskan outfit, BIK Karlskoga. In 2015, he was picked up by Karlskrona HK of the SHL. He saw the ice in 57 games during the 2015–16 season, scoring 13 goals while assisting on 16 more.

In April 2016, he signed with fellow SHL side Skellefteå AIK. He played two years with SAIK, leaving following the 2017–18 season, to sign a two-year contract with his fourth SHL club, Färjestad BK, on 27 April 2018.

He left Färjestad in May 2020 to pursue opportunities in the National Hockey League. On May 20, 2020, Olofsson agreed to join his brother Victor within the Buffalo Sabres organization, signing a one-year AHL contract with affiliate, the Rochester Americans. With the 2020–21 North American season delayed due the COVID-19 pandemic, Olofsson opted to remain in Europe, signing for the remainder of the Swiss NL campaign with SC Bern on 23 December 2020.

On April 29, 2021, Olofsson joined the SCL Tigers on a one-year deal for the 2021–22 season. Olofsson enjoyed a productive season with the Tigers, amassing 25 goals and 50 points in 43 regular season games. With the SCL Tigers missing out on the playoffs, Olofsson was signed earlier during the season to a two-year contract with EHC Biel on 24 December 2021.

Concluding his contract with Biel following two seasons, Olofsson returned to his original club in Sweden, MoDo Hockey, signing a five-year contract through 2029 on 4 April 2024.

== Career statistics ==
			Regular season					Playoffs
Season	Team	League	GP	G	A	Pts	PIM	GP	G	A	Pts	PIM
2008–09	Modo Hockey	J20	1	0	0	0	0	—	—	—	—	—
2009–10	Modo Hockey	J20	36	13	12	25	6	3	3	0	3	0
2010–11	Modo Hockey	J20	40	33	10	43	22	6	2	5	7	2
2010–11	Modo Hockey	SEL	5	0	0	0	0	—	—	—	—	—
2011–12	Modo Hockey	J20	24	15	14	29	8	8	2	2	4	6
2011–12	Modo Hockey	SEL	2	1	0	1	0	—	—	—	—	—
2011–12	IK Oskarshamn	Allsv	11	1	0	1	6	—	—	—	—	—
2011–12	IF Björklöven	Div.1	2	0	0	0	0	—	—	—	—	—
2012–13	Odense Bulldogs	DEN	37	19	15	34	8	14	6	3	9	2
2013–14	Almtuna IS	Allsv	33	8	11	19	6	—	—	—	—	—
2013–14	Almtuna IS	J20	2	7	1	8	2	—	—	—	—	—
2014–15	BIK Karlskoga	Allsv	50	23	13	36	20	5	1	1	2	0
2015–16	Karlskrona HK	SHL	52	13	13	26	6	—	—	—	—	—
2016–17	Skellefteå AIK	SHL	48	10	6	16	12	7	1	0	1	2
2017–18	Skellefteå AIK	SHL	52	11	10	21	8	16	4	2	6	31
2018–19	Färjestad BK	SHL	51	17	16	33	8	14	4	3	7	6
2019–20	Färjestad BK	SHL	44	17	11	28	12	—	—	—	—	—
2020–21	SC Bern	NL	32	10	13	23	6	6	3	2	5	0
2021–22	SCL Tigers	NL	43	25	25	50	4	—	—	—	—	—
2022–23	EHC Biel	NL	48	21	22	43	6	16	3	4	7	0
2023–24	EHC Biel	NL	36	10	11	21	8	3	0	1	1	0
2024–25	Modo Hockey	SHL	49	13	19	32	22	—	—	—	—	—
SHL totals			303	82	75	157	68	37	9	5	14	39
NL totals			159	66	71	137	24	25	6	7	13	0
