= Andrew Calof =

Canadian ice hockey player (born 1991)

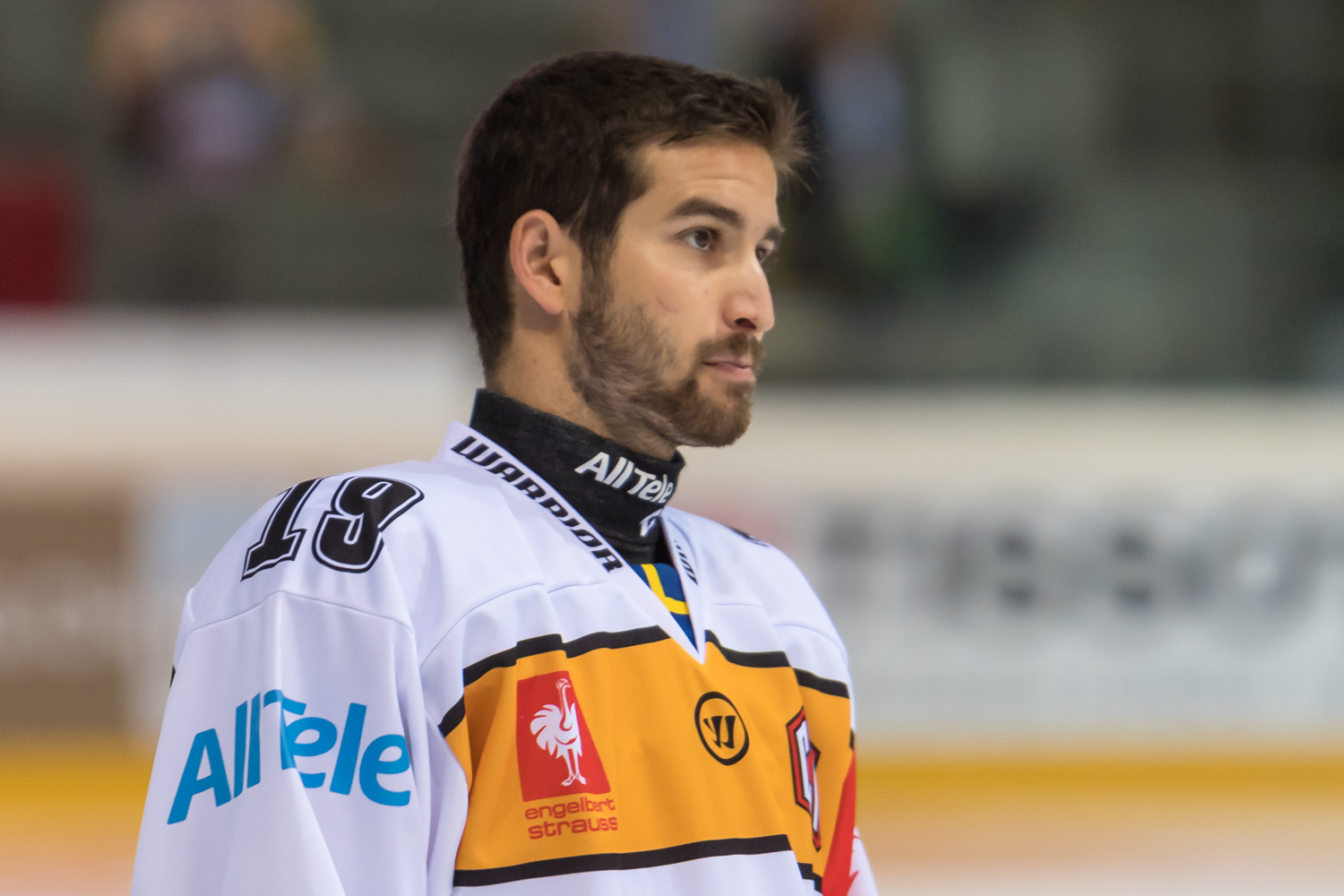
- Calof in 2016
- Born: May 9, 1991 (age 35) Ottawa, Ontario, Canada
- Height: 5 ft 10 in (178 cm)
- Weight: 179 lb (81 kg; 12 st 11 lb)
- Position: Centre
- Shoots: Right
- Slovak team Former teams: HK Poprad; Skellefteå AIK; Växjö Lakers; Torpedo Nizhny Novgorod; Traktor Chelyabinsk; Amur Khabarovsk; Lausanne HC
- NHL draft: Undrafted
- Playing career: 2014–present

Andrew James Calof (born May 9, 1991) is a Canadian professional ice hockey forward who currently playing for HK Poprad of the Slovak Extraliga.

== Early and personal life ==
Calof was born in Ottawa, Ontario, Canada, and is Jewish. His parents are Jonathan (a professor at the University of Ottawa) and Lois Calof (an office manager), and he has a brother Michael. He attended Sir Robert Borden High School, and was on the Ontario Provincial soccer team.

== Playing career ==
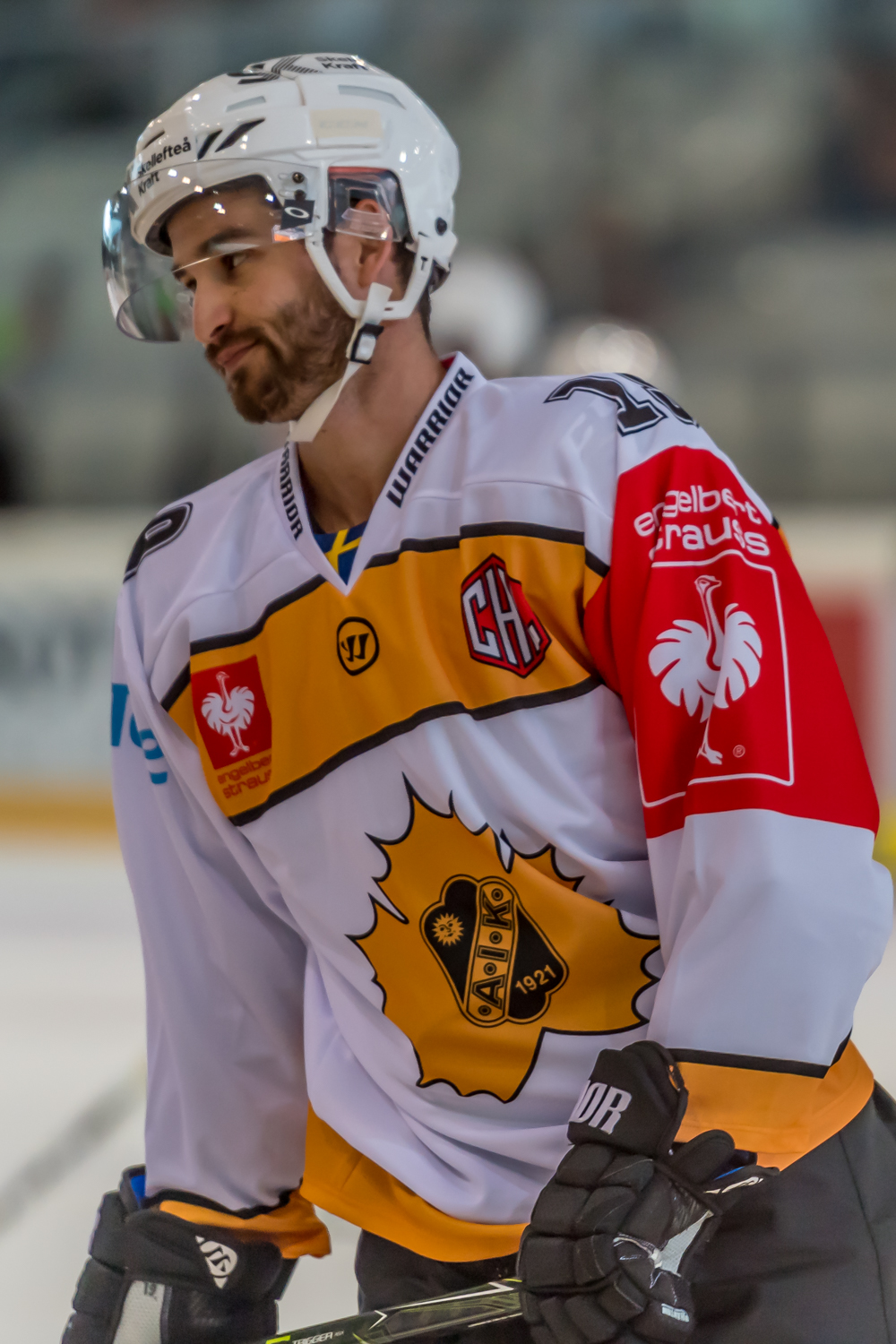
Andrew Calof during his tenure with Skellefteå AIK

In 2007 he was drafted in round 9 (#175 overall) by the Mississauga IceDogs in the Ontario Hockey League Priority Selection.

Playing for the Nepean Raiders, in 2008-09 he was a Canadian Junior Hockey League First All-Star Team and was the CJHL Top Prospect of the Year, and in 2009-10 he was CJHL Scholastic Player of the Year and was the MVP of the CJHL All-Star Game. He won the fastest skater competition at the National Junior A All-Star competition.

Calof opted to attended Princeton University, where he played with the Princeton Tigers men's ice hockey team which competed in NCAA's Division I in the ECAC Hockey conference for four seasons. In his freshman year (2010–11), Calof was named the ECAC Rookie of the Year, to the ECAC All-Rookie Team, and ECAC Third All Star Team. In 2011-12 he was All-Ivy League Second Team and in 2012–13 he was ECAC Second All-Star Team and All-Ivy League First Team. He competed for Team Canada at the 2013 Maccabiah Games in Israel, winning a gold medal while averaging 2.0 points per game with 10 points on five goals and five assists in five games.

Following his NCAA career, Calof continued his playing career signing with top Swedish club, Skellefteå AIK of the SHL. During the 2014–15 SHL season, Calof recorded 16 goals and 19 assists, gaining him attention for the SHL Rookie of the Year award.

After three seasons with Skellefteå AIK, Calof signed with fellow SHL club, Växjö Lakers on a one-year deal on April 10, 2017 playing a role in Växjö's 2017–18 SHL championship. Following the successful campaign with the Lakers, Calof joined Torpedo Nizhny Novgorod of the KHL for the 2018–19 season. After spending the 2019–20 season with Traktor Chelyabinsk, Calof opted to return to Sweden for a second stint with Växjö Lakers.

After claiming a second championships with the Lakers during his two season stint, Calof left the SHL and signed a one-year contract with German club, Schwenninger Wild Wings of the Deutsche Eishockey Liga (DEL) on May 18, 2022. However before joining the club, Calof terminated his contract with the Wild Wings in order to sign a lucrative one-year contract to return to the KHL with Amur Khabarovsk on August 1, 2022.

In the 2022–23 season, Calof made just 16 appearances with Amur in registering two points before opting to terminate his contract with the club on December 9, 2022. He would later join as a free agent Swiss club, Lausanne HC of the National League (NL), signing for the remainder of the season on February 16, 2023. On March 13, Lausanne HC announced that they would not re-sign Calof.

== Career statistics ==
			Regular season					Playoffs
Season	Team	League	GP	G	A	Pts	PIM	GP	G	A	Pts	PIM
2007–08	Hawkesbury Hawks	CJHL	58	20	20	40	14	11	7	4	11	4
2008–09	Nepean Raiders	CJHL	59	47	53	100	50	14	10	9	19	10
2009–10	Nepean Raiders	CJHL	57	45	52	97	42	6	3	4	7	10
2010–11	Princeton University	ECAC	32	9	24	33	18	—	—	—	—	—
2011–12	Princeton University	ECAC	32	17	14	31	16	—	—	—	—	—
2012–13	Princeton University	ECAC	31	14	24	38	22	—	—	—	—	—
2013–14	Princeton University	ECAC	22	4	17	21	10	—	—	—	—	—
2014–15	Skellefteå AIK	SHL	53	16	19	35	18	15	4	7	11	2
2015–16	Skellefteå AIK	SHL	52	19	15	34	45	16	7	3	10	4
2016–17	Skellefteå AIK	SHL	52	6	11	17	8	7	0	3	3	0
2017–18	Växjö Lakers	SHL	52	24	17	41	14	13	5	4	9	4
2018–19	Torpedo Nizhny Novgorod	KHL	58	22	19	41	22	7	0	2	2	6
2019–20	Traktor Chelyabinsk	KHL	55	8	25	33	8	—	—	—	—	—
2020–21	Växjö Lakers	SHL	39	14	25	39	22	12	0	4	4	6
2021–22	Växjö Lakers	SHL	34	5	8	13	6	1	0	0	0	0
2022–23	Amur Khabarovsk	KHL	16	1	1	2	2	—	—	—	—	—
2022–23	Lausanne HC	NL	1	0	0	0	0	—	—	—	—	—
2023–24	HK Poprad	Slovak	33	11	24	35	18	4	0	2	2	0
2024–25	HK Poprad	Slovak	53	20	49	69	12	6	4	7	11	6
2025–26	HK Poprad	Slovak	54	20	28	48	16	11	2	5	7	2
SHL totals			282	84	95	179	113	64	16	21	37	16
KHL totals			129	31	45	76	32	7	0	2	2	6

== Awards and honours ==
Award	Year
College
ECAC Rookie of the Year	2010–11
All-ECAC Hockey Rookie Team	2010–11
ECAC First-Team All-Ivy	2010–11
All-ECAC Hockey Third Team	2010–11
All-ECAC Hockey Second Team	2012–13
SHL
Le Mat Trophy champion	2018, 2021

== See also ==
- List of select Jewish ice hockey players

Awards and achievements
Preceded by Jerry D'Amigo	ECAC Hockey Rookie of the Year; 2010–11	Succeeded by Brian Ferlin
