= Victor Olofsson =

Swedish ice hockey player (born 1995)

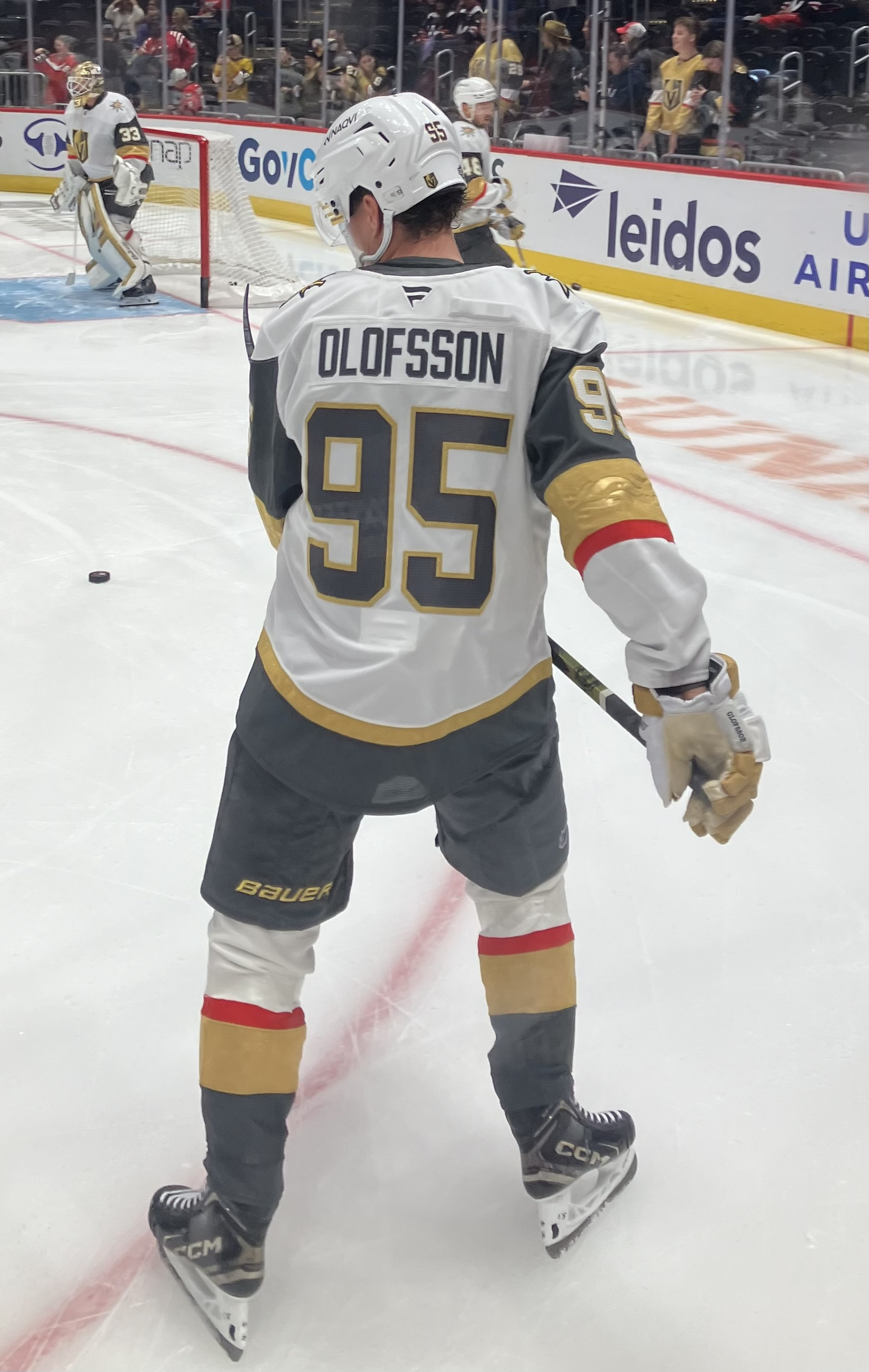
- Olofsson with the Vegas Golden Knights in 2024
- Born: 18 July 1995 (age 31) Örnsköldsvik, Sweden
- Height: 5 ft 11 in (180 cm)
- Weight: 182 lb (83 kg; 13 st 0 lb)
- Position: Left wing
- Shoots: Left
- NHL team Former teams: Vegas Golden Knights; Modo Hockey; Frölunda HC; Buffalo Sabres; Colorado Avalanche; Calgary Flames
- National team: Sweden
- NHL draft: 181st overall, 2014; Buffalo Sabres
- Playing career: 2013–present

Victor Olofsson (born 18 July 1995) is a Swedish professional ice hockey player who is a left winger for the Vegas Golden Knights of the National Hockey League (NHL). Olofsson was selected by the Buffalo Sabres in the 7th round, 181st overall, in the 2014 NHL entry draft, and has also played for the Colorado Avalanche and Calgary Flames. He is the younger brother of Jesper Olofsson, also a professional ice hockey player.

== Playing career ==
=== Swedish Hockey League ===
Olofsson made his Swedish Hockey League (SHL) debut playing with Modo Hockey during the 2013–14 season. At the conclusion of the 2015–16 season, Olofsson was unable to prevent Modo from relegation to the HockeyAllsvenskan. On April 3, 2016, Olofsson signed a two-year contract to remain in the SHL with Frölunda HC.

=== Buffalo Sabres ===
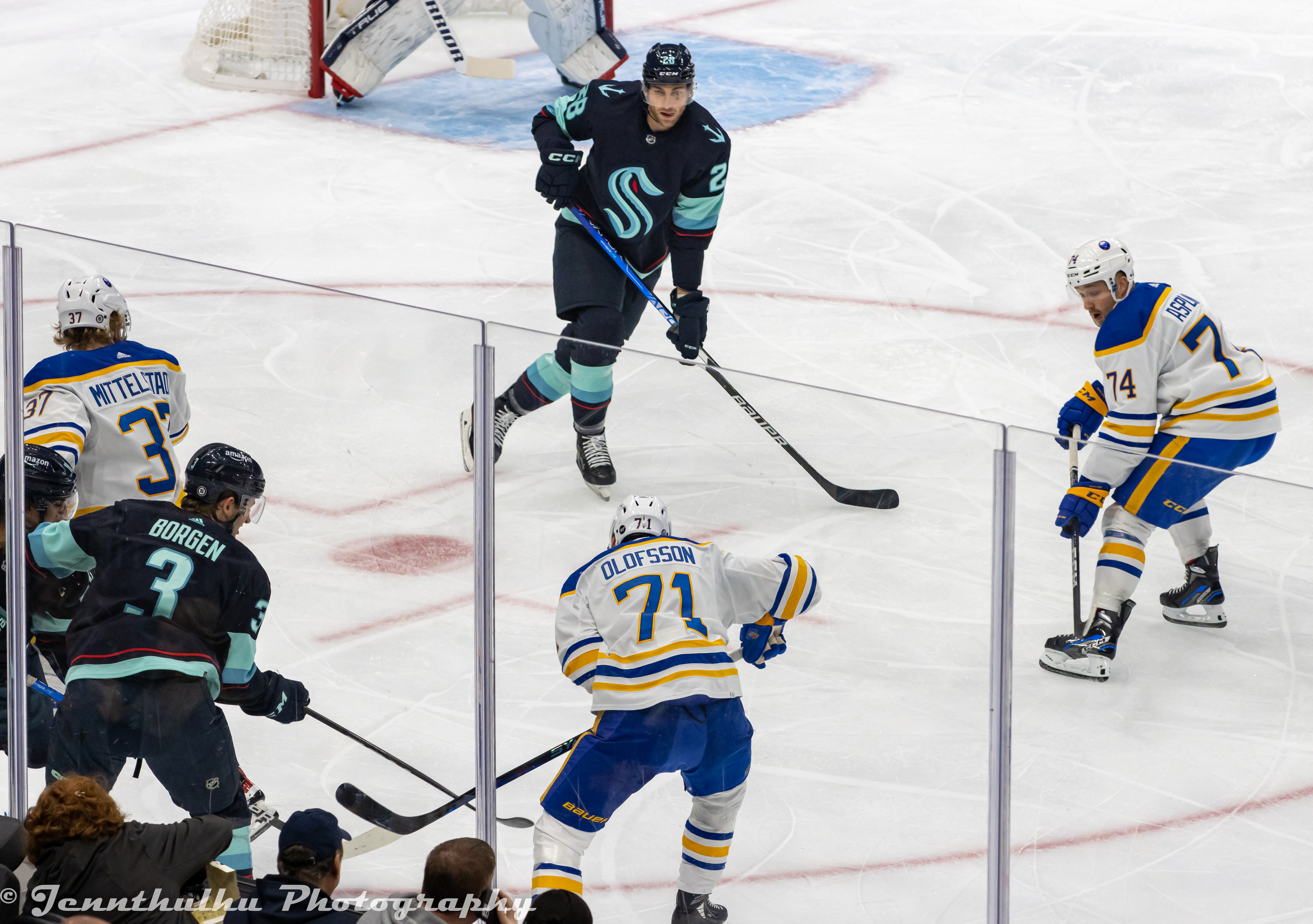
Olofsson in action against the Seattle Kraken in 2022.

At the conclusion of his contract with Frölunda HC following the 2017–18 season, Olofsson was signed to a two-year, entry-level contract with the Buffalo Sabres on 24 April 2018.

Olofsson made his NHL debut for the Sabres on 28 March 2019. He recorded an assist in a loss to the Detroit Red Wings. He scored his first NHL goal on the power play in his second game two days later in a loss to the New York Islanders. In the 2019–20 Buffalo Sabres home opener, on 5 October 2019, Olofsson scored two power play goals en route to a 7–2 victory over the New Jersey Devils. On 14 October 2019, Olofsson set an NHL record for scoring the first seven goals of his NHL career on the power play in a 4–0 shutout of the Dallas Stars.

Olofsson's impressive shot and ability to score have earned him the nickname Victor Goalofsson by the Buffalo fan base and the national media. He also began to put himself in the picture to be a candidate for the 2019–20 Calder Memorial Trophy, which is awarded to the NHL's rookie of the year. However, he endured a lower-body injury in a game against the Edmonton Oilers and was set to be out for 5–6 weeks.

=== Vegas Golden Knights ===
On 2 July 2024, having left the Sabres as a free agent, Olofsson was signed to a one-year, $1.075 million contract with the Vegas Golden Knights. Acquired by the Golden Knights to replace some of the offensive production lost in the off-season, Olofsson made his debut on the opening night of the 2024–25 season, scoring two goals, including Vegas' first of the season, in a 8–4 victory over the Colorado Avalanche. Featuring in a top-nine forward role, Olofsson produced the longest road point streak in franchise history, with points in 10 games from 4 December to 23 January.

Despite missing a month due to injury, Olofsson rebounded offensively to contribute with 15 goals and 29 points in 56 regular-season games. After helping Vegas qualify for the playoffs, Olofsson recorded 4 points over 9 appearances in his first career Stanley Cup playoffs campaign, before Vegas' second-round series defeat by the Edmonton Oilers.

=== Colorado Avalanche ===
Following his year with Vegas, Olofsson left as a free agent and was signed to a one-year, $1.575 million contract with the Colorado Avalanche for the 2025–26 season on 20 August 2025. On 28 October 2025, in a game against the New Jersey Devils, Olofsson scored the first hat-trick of his career.

=== Calgary Flames ===
On 6 March 2026, Olofsson was traded to the Calgary Flames, alongside Maximillian Curran, a conditional 2027 second-round pick, and a conditional 2028 first-round pick, in exchange for Nazem Kadri and a 2027 fourth-round pick.

=== Return to Vegas ===
As a free agent for the third consecutive offseason, Olofsson signed a one-year, $1.64 million contract to return to the Vegas Golden Knights for the 2026–27 season on 1 July 2026. On 29 September, in the Golden Knights' opening game, Olofsson scored the first goal of Vegas' season for the second time in his career, with Vegas ultimately defeating the Chicago Blackhawks 5–2.

== International play ==
Medal record

Representing Sweden

Ice hockey

World Championships
Bronze medal – third place	2024 Czech Republic	

Olofsson represented Sweden at the 2024 IIHF World Championship and won a bronze medal.

== Career statistics ==
=== Regular season and playoffs ===
			Regular season					Playoffs
Season	Team	League	GP	G	A	Pts	PIM	GP	G	A	Pts	PIM
2011–12	Modo Hockey	J18	21	15	12	27	2	—	—	—	—	—
2011–12	Modo Hockey	J18 Allsv	18	4	3	7	2	2	1	0	1	0
2012–13	Modo Hockey	J18	19	19	17	36	6	—	—	—	—	—
2012–13	Modo Hockey	J18 Allsv	18	12	7	19	0	4	1	2	3	0
2012–13	Modo Hockey	J20	7	2	3	5	0	6	0	1	1	0
2013–14	Modo Hockey	J20	44	32	21	53	16	5	4	5	9	2
2013–14	Modo Hockey	SHL	11	0	0	0	0	—	—	—	—	—
2014–15	Modo Hockey	J20	6	1	3	4	0	5	3	5	8	0
2014–15	Modo Hockey	SHL	39	10	8	18	4	—	—	—	—	—
2014–15	Timrå IK	Allsv	8	2	0	2	0	—	—	—	—	—
2015–16	Modo Hockey	SHL	49	14	15	29	6	—	—	—	—	—
2016–17	Frölunda HC	SHL	51	9	18	27	2	14	4	8	12	0
2017–18	Frölunda HC	SHL	50	27	16	43	8	6	3	1	4	2
2018–19	Rochester Americans	AHL	66	30	33	63	12	3	0	0	0	0
2018–19	Buffalo Sabres	NHL	6	2	2	4	2	—	—	—	—	—
2019–20	Buffalo Sabres	NHL	54	20	22	42	6	—	—	—	—	—
2020–21	Buffalo Sabres	NHL	56	13	19	32	6	—	—	—	—	—
2021–22	Buffalo Sabres	NHL	72	20	29	49	6	—	—	—	—	—
2022–23	Buffalo Sabres	NHL	75	28	12	40	4	—	—	—	—	—
2023–24	Buffalo Sabres	NHL	51	7	8	15	4	—	—	—	—	—
2024–25	Vegas Golden Knights	NHL	56	15	14	29	16	9	2	2	4	0
2025–26	Colorado Avalanche	NHL	60	11	14	25	6	—	—	—	—	—
2025–26	Calgary Flames	NHL	18	2	4	6	0	—	—	—	—	—
SHL totals			200	60	57	117	20	20	7	9	16	2
NHL totals			448	118	124	242	50	9	2	2	4	0

=== International ===
Year	Team	Event	Result	GP	G	A	Pts	PIM
2015	Sweden	WJC	4th	7	0	1	1	0
2021	Sweden	WC	9th	7	3	1	4	2
2024	Sweden	WC	3rd place, bronze medalist(s)	9	1	3	4	0
Junior totals				7	0	1	1	0
Senior totals				16	4	4	8	2

== Awards and honors ==
Award	Year
CHL
Champion	2017
SHL
Håkan Loob Trophy	2017–18
NHL
All-Rookie Team	2019–20
