= Viktor Andrén =

Swedish ice hockey goaltender

- Born: 17 February 1994 (age 31); Mariestad, Sweden
- Height: 6 ft 0 in (183 cm)
- Weight: 190 lb (86 kg; 13 st 8 lb)
- Position: Goaltender
- Catches: Right
- Allsv team Former teams: Almtuna IS; Växjö Lakers; Brynäs IF
- Playing career: 2011–present

Viktor Andrén (born 17 February 1994) is a Swedish professional ice hockey goaltender. He is currently playing with Almtuna IS of the HockeyAllsvenskan (Allsv).

== Playing career ==
Born in Mariestad, Sweden, Andrén played junior hockey, with local team Mariestad BoIS. In 2009–10, he debuted at the under-16 level, playing eight games in the J16 SM. He also competed with a regional all-star team from Västergötland in the annual TV-pucken, an under-15 national tournament. The following season he dressed for 27 U-18 games and moved on to Mariestad BoIS's U20 team. In 2011–12, after impressive performance in the youth ranks, Andrén was promoted to Mariestad BoIS's senior squad where he made his debut in the Swedish Hockeyettan. After a three-year stint at Mariestad BoIS, Andrén signed with Växjö Lakers.

After playing for Växjö Lakers's U20 team for two seasons, Andrén signed with IK Pantern. In 2014–15, Andrén played 33 games for IK Pantern, and became a significant contributor to the team's promotion to the HockeyAllsvenskan. Andrén left IK Pantern after the 2015–16 season, playing 34 games and finishing with a 2.17 GAA and .922 save percentage. In 2016–17, Andrén made his Swedish Hockey League debut.

Andrén played four seasons with the Växjö Lakers before leaving the club out of contract to sign a two-year deal with Brynäs IF on 27 March 2020.

== Career statistics ==
			Regular season									Playoffs
Season	Team	League	GP	W	L	T/OT	Min	GA	SO	GAA	SV%	GP	W	L	Min	GA	SO	GAA	SV%
2010–11	Mariestad BoIS	J20	2	—	—	—	—	—	—	3.50	.926	—	—	—	—	—	—	—	—
2011–12	Mariestad BoIS	J20	16	—	—	—	—	—	—	2.97	.917	—	—	—	—	—	—	—	—
2011–12	Mariestad BoIS	Div. 1	1	—	—	—	—	—	—	5.00	.898	—	—	—	—	—	—	—	—	-
2012–13	Växjö Lakers	J20	33	16	17	0	—	—	1	2.98	.917	—	—	—	—	—	—	—	—
2013–14	Växjö Lakers	J20	40	17	22	0	—	—	3	3.28	.919	—	—	—	—	—	—	—	—
2014–15	IK Pantern	Div. 1	31	25	6	0	—	—	3	1.86	.925	9	—	—	—	—	—	2.55	.902
2015–16	IK Pantern	Allsv	34	15	18	0	—	—	4	2.17	.922	—	—	—	—	—	—	—	—

== Awards and honours ==
Award	Year
SHL
Le Mat Trophy (Växjö Lakers)	2018
