= Eric Martinsson =

Swedish ice hockey player (born 1992)

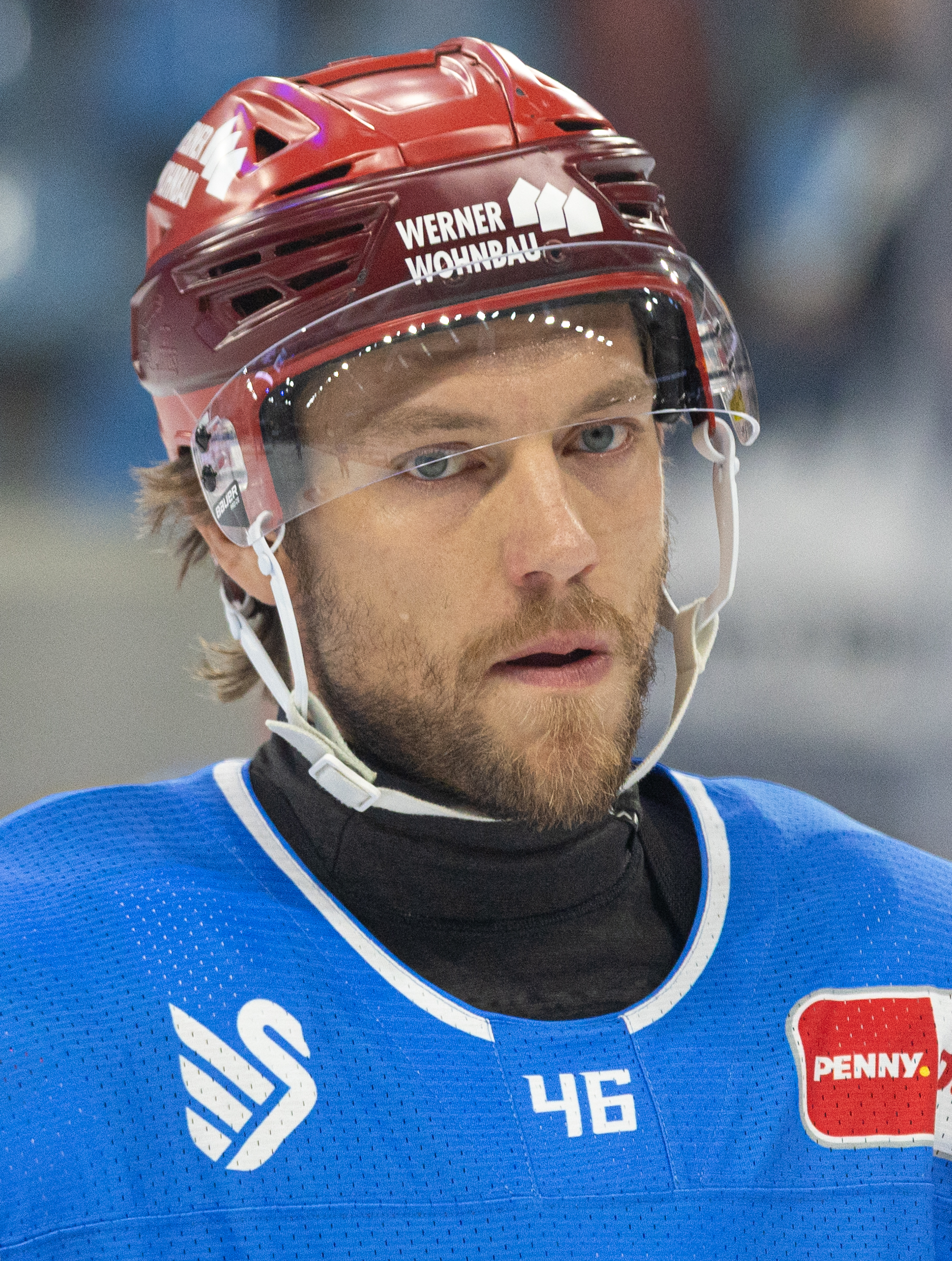
- Martinsson in 2025
- Born: October 22, 1992 (age 33) Klippan, Sweden
- Height: 6 ft 1 in (185 cm)
- Weight: 190 lb (86 kg; 13 st 8 lb)
- Position: Defence
- Shoots: Left
- DEL team Former teams: Schwenninger Wild Wings; Växjö Lakers; Genève-Servette HC; HV71; Barys Nur-Sultan
- NHL draft: Undrafted
- Playing career: 2012–present

Eric Martinsson (born October 22, 1992) is a Swedish professional ice hockey defenceman who is currently playing for the Schwenninger Wild Wings of the Deutsche Eishockey Liga (DEL).

== Playing career ==
Martinsson originally played as a youth with Rögle BK in the SuperElit before spending one North American junior season with the Des Moines Buccaneers of the United States Hockey League (USHL) in the 2012–13 season.

After he was passed over in the 2013 NHL entry draft, Martinsson opted to return to Sweden to make his debut with Rögle BK in the Allsvenskan in the 2013–14 season. He featured in 19 games for 3 assists, before breaking out offensively in the postseason qualifiers with 14 points in 16 games.

With Rögle BK confined to the second tier Allsvenskan, Martinsson signed an initial two-year contract with the Växjö Lakers of the Swedish Hockey League (SHL) on April 15, 2014. Martinsson made his SHL debut playing with Lakers during the 2014–15 SHL season, and won a Le Mat Trophy.

After helping the Växjö Lakers to a second Swedish championship in the 2017–18 season, Martinsson as a free agent, agreed to terms on a one-year, two-way contract with the Minnesota Wild of the National Hockey League (NHL) on May 2, 2018. After attending the Wild's training camp, Martinsson was assigned to begin the 2018–19 season, with American Hockey League affiliate, the Iowa Wild. Martinsson produced 9 assists in 13 games before opting to mutually terminate his contract with the Wild, after being placed on unconditional waivers on November 28, 2018.

On November 28, 2018, Martinsson joined Swiss club, Genève-Servette HC of the National League (NL) for the remainder of the season on a one-year deal worth CHF 500,000. He was brought to the team as a replacement for injured Johan Fransson. On January 6, 2019, Martinsson was hit from behind, falling head first into the boards, by Marc Wieser in a game against HC Davos. Martinsson left the game and went straight to the hospital in Davos, where he spent the night, before returning to Geneva the next day. He suffered a severe concussion which sidelined him for the next two months. Whereas Wieser was only fined CHF 5,100 and suspended for three games. Martinsson returned to Geneva's lineup with 10 games remaining in the regular season and was a healthy scratch for games 3 and 4 of the 2019 Quarterfinals against SC Bern. Martinsson displayed poor performances following his return and was not offered a contract extension by Geneva, making him a free agent.

On April 17, 2019, Martinsson returned to Sweden, agreeing to a three-year contract with HV71 of the SHL.

Following the conclusion of the 2022–23 season, having regressed offensively with just 1 goal and 12 points through 44 games, Martinsson was mutually released from the remaining two years of his contract with HV71 on 15 March 2023.

After completing his second season in his return to original SHL club, Växjö Lakers, Martinsson left Sweden to sign a one-year contract with German club, Schwenninger Wild Wings of the DEL, on 18 July 2025.

== Career statistics ==
			Regular season					Playoffs
Season	Team	League	GP	G	A	Pts	PIM	GP	G	A	Pts	PIM
2009–10	Rögle BK	J20	37	2	5	7	24	2	0	0	0	0
2010–11	Rögle BK	J20	23	3	4	7	6	3	1	0	1	0
2011–12	Rögle BK	J20	47	7	26	33	71	7	1	6	7	39
2011–12	Helsingborgs HC	Div.1	7	1	3	4	27	—	—	—	—	—
2012–13	Des Moines Buccaneers	USHL	59	7	26	33	66	—	—	—	—	—
2013–14	Rögle BK	J20	5	1	1	2	4	—	—	—	—	—
2013–14	Rögle BK	Allsv	19	0	3	3	10	16	4	10	14	14
2013–14	Helsingborgs HC	Div.1	14	3	7	10	14	—	—	—	—	—
2014–15	Växjö Lakers	SHL	47	1	3	4	14	15	0	2	2	10
2015–16	Växjö Lakers	SHL	50	2	10	12	57	13	2	5	7	4
2016–17	Växjö Lakers	SHL	41	4	11	15	30	6	0	2	2	0
2017–18	Växjö Lakers	SHL	46	3	14	17	34	13	3	8	11	18
2018–19	Iowa Wild	AHL	13	0	9	9	10	—	—	—	—	—
2018–19	Genève-Servette HC	NL	19	1	4	5	2	4	0	0	0	0
2019–20	HV71	SHL	43	3	19	22	16	—	—	—	—	—
2020–21	HV71	SHL	51	5	32	37	34	—	—	—	—	—
2021–22	Barys Nur-Sultan	KHL	38	0	11	11	26	5	0	0	0	2
2022–23	HV71	SHL	44	1	11	12	8	—	—	—	—	—
2023–24	Växjö Lakers	SHL	52	4	11	15	20	8	0	1	1	31
2024–25	Växjö Lakers	SHL	48	8	9	17	16	8	0	2	2	25
SHL totals			420	31	120	151	229	63	5	20	25	88

== Awards and honors ==
Award	Year
SHL
Le Mat Trophy (Växjö Lakers)	2015, 2018
