= Pontus Petterström =

Swedish ice hockey player

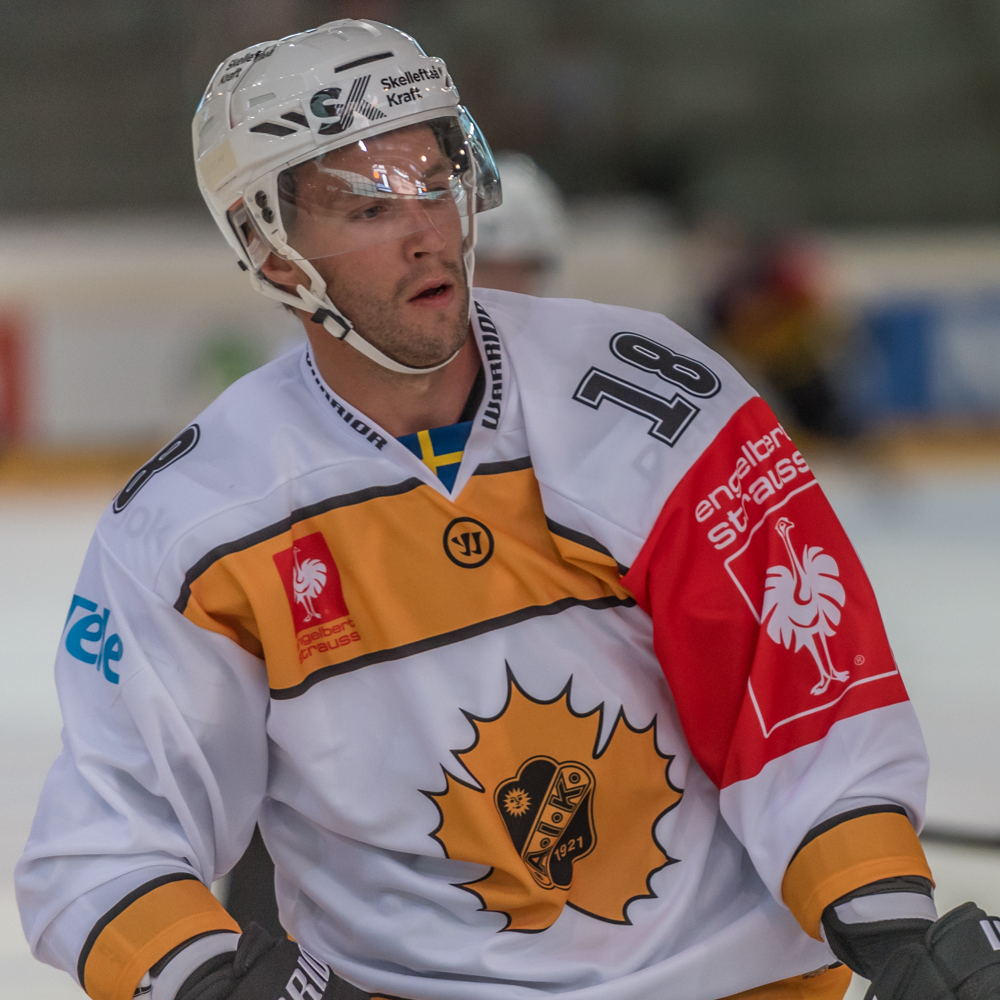
- Born: April 21, 1982 (age 44)
- Height: 6 ft 0 in (183 cm)
- Weight: 185 lb (84 kg; 13 st 3 lb)
- Position: Winger
- Shot: Left
- Played for: Linköpings HC; Skellefteå AIK
- NHL draft: 226th overall, 2001; New York Rangers
- Playing career: 2002–2018

Pontus Petterström (born April 21, 1982) is a Swedish former professional ice hockey winger. He last played for Skellefteå AIK of the Swedish Hockey League (SHL). He was selected by the New York Rangers in the 7th round (226th overall) of the 2001 NHL entry draft.

He previously played with Linköpings HC.

== Career statistics ==
=== Regular season and playoffs ===
			Regular season					Playoffs
Season	Team	League	GP	G	A	Pts	PIM	GP	G	A	Pts	PIM
1999–2000	Leksands IF	J18 Allsv	1	0	1	1	0	6	1	1	2	4
1999–2000	Leksands IF	J20	35	13	10	23	22	2	0	0	0	4
2000–01	Tingsryds AIF	Allsv	38	8	5	13	24	3	0	2	2	2
2002–03	Skellefteå AIK	Allsv	38	15	5	20	18	8	2	1	3	4
2003–04	Skellefteå AIK	Allsv	39	12	17	29	18	—	—	—	—	—
2004–05	Skellefteå AIK	Allsv	43	5	11	16	20	10	1	1	2	6
2005–06	Skellefteå AIK	Allsv	34	8	8	16	49	10	1	0	1	6
2006–07	Skellefteå AIK	SEL	50	10	6	16	38	—	—	—	—	—
2007–08	Skellefteå AIK	SEL	53	5	5	10	28	5	0	0	0	4
2008–09	Linköpings HC	SEL	55	4	14	18	30	7	2	1	3	0
2009–10	Linköpings HC	SEL	50	4	10	14	12	—	—	—	—	—
2010–11	Linköpings HC	SEL	48	10	5	15	22	6	0	2	2	4
2011–12	Linköpings HC	SEL	52	5	5	10	10	—	—	—	—	—
2012–13	Skellefteå AIK	SEL	45	11	11	22	14	13	1	3	4	16
2013–14	Skellefteå AIK	SHL	36	5	7	12	12	5	0	0	0	2
2014–15	Skellefteå AIK	SHL	37	2	5	7	6	13	1	1	2	0
2015–16	Skellefteå AIK	SHL	48	2	6	8	6	16	1	1	2	2
2016–17	Skellefteå AIK	SHL	49	2	8	10	14	7	0	0	0	0
2017–18	Skellefteå AIK	SHL	33	2	3	5	37	16	3	1	4	8
Allsv totals			192	48	46	94	129	31	4	4	8	18
SEL/SHL totals			556	62	85	147	229	88	8	9	17	36

=== International ===
Year	Team	Event	GP	G	A	Pts	PIM
2000	Sweden	WJC18	6	2	1	3	6
Junior totals			6	2	1	3	6
