= List of Canada national ice hockey team captains =

This is a list of captains of various ice hockey teams which have represented Canada in international play.

== Summit Series team captains ==
- 1972 None
- 1974 Pat Stapleton

== Canada Cup team captains ==
- 1976 Bobby Clarke
- 1981 Denis Potvin
- 1984 Wayne Gretzky and Larry Robinson (co-captains)
- 1987 Wayne Gretzky
- 1991 Wayne Gretzky

== World Cup of Hockey team captains ==
- 1996 Wayne Gretzky
- 2004 Mario Lemieux
- 2016 Sidney Crosby

== 4 Nations Face-Off ==
- 2025 Sidney Crosby

== Winter Olympics men's & women's team captains ==
Men's

- 1920 Frank Fredrickson
- 1924 Dunc Munro
- 1928 John Porter
- 1932 William Cockburn
- 1936 Herman Murray
- 1948 George Mara
- 1952 Billy Dawe
- 1956 Jack McKenzie
- 1960 Harry Sinden
- 1964 Hank Akervall
- 1968 Marshall Johnston
- 1980 Randy Gregg
- 1984 Dave Tippett
- 1988 Trent Yawney
- 1992 Brad Schlegel
- 1994 Fabian Joseph
- 1998 Eric Lindros
- 2002 Mario Lemieux
- 2006 Joe Sakic
- 2010 Scott Niedermayer
- 2014 Sidney Crosby
- 2018 Chris Kelly
- 2022 Eric Staal
- 2026 Sidney Crosby* and Connor McDavid

Note: Sidney Crosby was injured (missed the rest of the tournament); Connor McDavid replaced him as captain.

Women's

- 1998 Stacy Wilson
- 2002, 2006 Cassie Campbell
- 2010 Hayley Wickenheiser
- 2014 Caroline Ouellette
- 2018, 2022, 2026 Marie-Philip Poulin

== IIHF Canada men's national ice hockey team captains ==
Note: The Ice Hockey World Championships were not held in Winter Olympic years prior to 1972 (no tournaments in 1980, 1984, and 1988). Until 1968, the Olympic Ice Hockey champions were considered the Ice Hockey World champions for that year.

- 1930 Howard Armstrong
- 1931 Gord MacKenzie
- 1933–1939 None
- 1949–1950 None
- 1951 Hector Negrello
- 1954 Tom Campbell
- 1955 George McAvoy
- 1958 Harry Sinden
- 1959–1965 None
- 1966 Terry O'Malley
- 1967 Roger Bourbonnais
- 1969 None
- 1977 Phil Esposito
- 1978 Marcel Dionne
- 1979 Guy Charron
- 1981 Lanny McDonald
- 1982 Bobby Clarke
- 1983 Darryl Sittler
- 1985 Dave Taylor
- 1986 Marcel Dionne
- 1987 Mike Foligno
- 1989 Steve Yzerman
- 1990 Paul Coffey
- 1991 Doug Lidster
- 1992 Glenn Anderson
- 1993 Adam Graves
- 1994 Luc Robitaille
- 1995 Brian Tutt
- 1996 Steve Thomas
- 1997 Dean Evason
- 1998 Keith Primeau
- 1999 Rob Blake
- 2000 Mike Sillinger
- 2001 Michael Peca* and Ryan Smyth
- 2002–2005 Ryan Smyth
- 2006 Brendan Shanahan
- 2007–2009 Shane Doan
- 2010 Ryan Smyth* and Ray Whitney
- 2011 Rick Nash
- 2012 Ryan Getzlaf
- 2013 Eric Staal
- 2014 Kevin Bieksa
- 2015 Sidney Crosby
- 2016 Corey Perry
- 2017 Claude Giroux
- 2018 Connor McDavid
- 2019 Kyle Turris
- 2021 Adam Henrique
- 2022 Thomas Chabot
- 2023 Tyler Toffoli
- 2024 John Tavares
- 2025 Sidney Crosby
- 2026 Macklin Celebrini

Note: Michael Peca was injured (missed the rest of the tournament); Ryan Smyth replaced him as captain.

Note: Ryan Smyth was injured (missed the rest of the tournament); Ray Whitney replaced him as captain.

== IIHF Canada women's national ice hockey team captains ==
Note: The first tournament (1987) was unofficial. The first official tournament was held in 1990.
Note: The IIHF Women's World Championship tournament was not held in Winter Olympic years until 2022. Regional championships were held in 1995 and 1996, and the 3/4 Nations Cup has been held yearly since 1996.

- 1987: Marian Coveny
- 1990 Sue Scherer
- 1992, 1994 France St. Louis
- 1995–1998 Stacy Wilson
- 1999–2001 Thérèse Brisson
- 2002–2006 Cassie Campbell
- 2007–2013 Hayley Wickenheiser
- 2014 Caroline Ouellette
- 2015–present Marie-Philip Poulin

== World Junior (U20) championships ==
Note: The first three tournaments (1974–76) are unofficial. The first official tournament was held in 1977.

- 1974 Doug Jarvis
- 1976 Fern LeBlanc
- 1977 Dale McCourt
- 1978 Ryan Walter
- 1979 John-Paul Kelly
- 1980 Rick Lanz, Dave Fenyves
- 1981 Marc Crawford
- 1982 Troy Murray
- 1983 James Patrick
- 1984 Russ Courtnall
- 1985 Dan Hodgson
- 1986 Jim Sandlak
- 1987 Steve Chiasson
- 1988 Theoren Fleury
- 1989 Éric Desjardins
- 1990 Dave Chyzowski
- 1991 Steven Rice
- 1992 Eric Lindros
- 1993 Martin Lapointe
- 1994 Brent Tully
- 1995 Todd Harvey
- 1996 Nolan Baumgartner
- 1997 Brad Larsen
- 1998 Cory Sarich, Jesse Wallin
- 1999 Mike Van Ryn
- 2000 Manny Malhotra
- 2001 Steve McCarthy
- 2002 Jarret Stoll
- 2003 Scottie Upshall
- 2004 Dan Paille
- 2005 Mike Richards
- 2006 Kyle Chipchura
- 2007 Kris Letang
- 2008 Karl Alzner
- 2009 Thomas Hickey
- 2010 Patrice Cormier
- 2011 Ryan Ellis
- 2012 Jaden Schwartz
- 2013 Ryan Nugent-Hopkins
- 2014 Scott Laughton
- 2015 Curtis Lazar
- 2016 Brayden Point
- 2017 Dylan Strome
- 2018 Dillon Dubé
- 2019 Maxime Comtois
- 2020 Barrett Hayton
- 2021 Kirby Dach*, Dylan Cozens and Bowen Byram
- 2022 Kaiden Guhle (winter), Mason McTavish (summer)
- 2023 Shane Wright
- 2024 Fraser Minten
- 2025 Brayden Yager
- 2026 Porter Martone

Note: Kirby Dach was injured (missing the entire tournament), Dylan Cozens and Bowen Byram replaced him as captain.

== World U18 championships ==
- 2002 André Benoit
- 2003 Braydon Coburn
- 2004 John Lammers
- 2005 Ryan Parent
- 2006 Ty Wishart
- 2007 Angelo Esposito
- 2008 Cody Hodgson
- 2009 Ryan O'Reilly
- 2010 Erik Gudbranson
- 2011 Ryan Murray
- 2012 Matt Dumba
- 2013 Sam Reinhart
- 2014 Roland McKeown
- 2015 Mitchell Stephens
- 2016 Tyson Jost
- 2017 Jaret Anderson-Dolan
- 2018 Ty Smith
- 2019 Peyton Krebs
- 2021 Shane Wright
- 2022 Connor Bedard
- 2023 Cameron Allen
- 2024 Porter Martone
- 2025 Braeden Cootes
- 2026 Keaton Verhoeff
