= Markus Ljungh =

Swedish ice hockey player (born 1991)

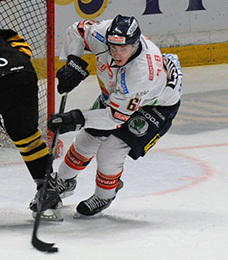
- Ljungh in 2014
- Born: 11 January 1991 (age 35) Västerås, Sweden
- Height: 5 ft 9 in (175 cm)
- Weight: 170 lb (77 kg; 12 st 2 lb)
- Position: Centre
- Shoots: Right
- DEL team Former teams: Kolner Haie; Djurgårdens IF; HV71; Admiral Vladivostok; Linkoping HC
- Playing career: 2010–present

Markus Stefan Ljungh (born 11 January 1991) is a Swedish professional ice hockey player. He is currently playing with Kölner Haie of the Deutsche Eishockey Liga(DEL). In Sweden, he has played for Västerås IK, Djurgårdens IF, HV71 and Linköping HC, in both the Swedish Hockey League (SEL) and HockeyAllsvenskan, as well as Admiral Vladivostok of the Kontinental Hockey League (KHL).

Ljungh made his senior national team debut in April 2016, and has played 16 senior international matches for Sweden.

== Career ==
=== Västerås IK ===
Lljungh began playing for Vasteras IK in 2006, at the age anof 15, at the under 16's level, progressing up to the under 20's side over the next three years. He made his professional debut in the HockeyAllsvenskan on 2 December, 2009 against Oskarshamn IK, in a 5-2 win for Västerås. Ljungh went on to appear in 8 senior games that season, and recorded one point. The following two seasons, Ljungh was a regular for the Västerås senior team. He scored his first HockeyAllsvenskan goal on 15 September, 2010 in a 5–0 win against Bofors IK. Ljungh won the Guldgallret for the 2010-11 season, as the leagues best young player. In 49 games, he scored 32 points, with 13 goals and 19 assists. In Ljungh's second full season for the Västerås senior team, he was one of the team's assistant team captains. He scored 23 points in 50 regular season games. In the six qualification games, he accounted for three goals and three assists.

=== Djurgårdens IF ===
On 31 May 2012, it was confirmed that Ljungh had left Västerås to play for Djurgårdens IF, signing a two year contract. During his second season with Djurgården, in 52 games, he scored 32 points, with 17 goals and 15 assists. He was the team's joint top scorer, alongside Dustin Johner. Djurgården finished third in the regular season, and so made it to the HockeyAllsvenskan qualifying series, where they finished second and thus advanced to the SHL.

On 5 May 2014, it was announced that Ljungh had signed a two year contract extension with Djurgården. He played his first SHL game on 13 September, 2014, against the Växjö Lakers. On 17 September 2014, he scored his first SHL goal, in a 4–1 win over Leksands IF. Djurgården finished ninth in the regular season, and Ljungh scored 27 points in 54 games. The following summer, Ljungh again extended his contract with Djurgården for two more seasons, which was confirmed on 17 June, 2015. Ahead of the 2015-16 season, he was named one of Djurgården's assistant team captains. He then had his best point-scoring season for the club, achieving 36 points in 48 regular season games. Ljungh then played two more seasons for Djurgården. After playing the opening two games of the 2017-18 season, Ljungh then missed twelve games after undergoing surgery for an inguinal hernia.

=== HV71 ===
After six seasons with Djurgårdens IF, it was confirmed on 20 April, 2018 that Ljungh had signed a two-year contract with SHL team HV71. He played all matches in the regular season, scoring 40 points, with 24 assists and 16 goals. In the SHL playoffs, HV71 knocked out Rögle BK in the eight-finals, before being eliminated by Färjestad BK in the quarterfinals, losing game 7 of a seven game series. Ljungh won the 2018-19 Rinkens Riddare as the player who showed the most sportsmanship that year. He only had 8 penalty minutes that season, and said 'it was delightful' to win the award.

=== Admiral Vladivostok ===
In May 2019, it was confirmed that Ljungh had exercised a clause in his contract with HV71 to be able to play in the KHL. On 17 May, Admiral Vladivostok announced that they had signed a one-year contract with Ljungh. He made his KHL debut on 3 September, 2019 in a 3–1 win against Barys Astana, also scoring his first KHL goal in that game. Ljungh scored 37 points in 59 regular season games, with 15 goals and 22 assists.

=== Linköping HC ===
On 2 May 2020, it was announced that Ljungh had returned to Sweden and signed a three-year contract with Linköping HC. He was named one of the team assistant team captains. In 45 games played, he scored 36 points, 11 goals and 25 assists. The following season, Ljungh scored the most points he'd ever scored in any SHL season. He played all 52 regular season games, scoring 44 points, with 15 goals and 29 assists. On 18 February, 2022, it was announced that Ljungh had signed a new contract with Linköping, which would keep him there for 5 seasons.

In the 2022-23 season, after 44 games, scoring 22 points, with 8 goals and 14 assists. In addition, he had, alongside Ty Rattie, the worst plus/minus statistics in the entire SHL (-22). The following season, Ljungh scored 29 points in 47 regular season games, with 14 goals and 15 assists. On March 5, 2024, he scored his 100th goal in the SHL. In the SHL playoffs, Linköping were swept by Skellefteå AIK. In his fifth season for Linköping, Ljungh was achieved his first hat trick in the SHL on 26 November, 2024 in a 6–1 victory against Timrå IK. He missed only one regular season game and scored 35 points in the regular season, including eleven goals. Linköping finished in twelfth place, thus missing the playoffs.

In the 2025-26 season, Ljungh played all 52 regular season matches. Linköping finished in eleventh place, and missed the playoffs for the second season in a row. Ljungh achieved 29 points, scoring 8 goals and 21 assists. Despite having one year left on his contract, it was announced on April 9, 2026, that Ljungh had left Linköping after six seasons with the club.

=== Kölner Haie ===
On 1 July 2026, it was confirmed that Ljungh had signed a contract with the German club Kölner Haie in the DEL.

== International ==
Ljungh made his senior national team debut on 7 April, 2016 in a friendly against Switzerland. He has played 16 games for Sweden.

== Statistics ==
Season	Club	League	Games Played	Goals	Assists	Point
2009–10	Västerås IK	HA	8	0	1	1
2010–11	Västerås IK	HA	49	13	19	32
2011–12	Västerås IK	HA	50	8	15	23
2012–13	Djurgårdens IF	HA	50	2	5	7
2013–14	Djurgårdens IF	HA	52	17	15	32
2014–15	Djurgårdens IF	SHL	54	8	19	27
2015–16	Djurgårdens IF	SHL	48	13	23	36
2016–17	Djurgårdens IF	SHL	49	8	15	23
2017–18	Djurgårdens IF	SHL	40	7	14	21
2018–19	HV71	SHL	52	16	24	40
2019–20	Admiral Vladivostok	KHL	59	15	22	37
2020–21	Linköping HC	SHL	45	11	25	36
2021–22	Linköping HC	SHL	52	15	29	44
2022–23	Linköping HC	SHL	44	8	14	22
2023–24	Linköping HC	SHL	47	14	15	29
2024–25	Linköping HC	SHL	51	11	24	35
2025–26	Linköping HC	SHL	52	8	21	29
SHL total			534	119	223	342
HockeyAllsvenskan total			209	40	55	95

== Honours ==
Season	Award	Reason
2010-11	Guldgallret	Best young player in HockeyAllsvenskan
2018-19	Rinkens Riddare	Most sportsmanship in SHL
