= Pär Lindholm =

Swedish ice hockey player (born 1991)

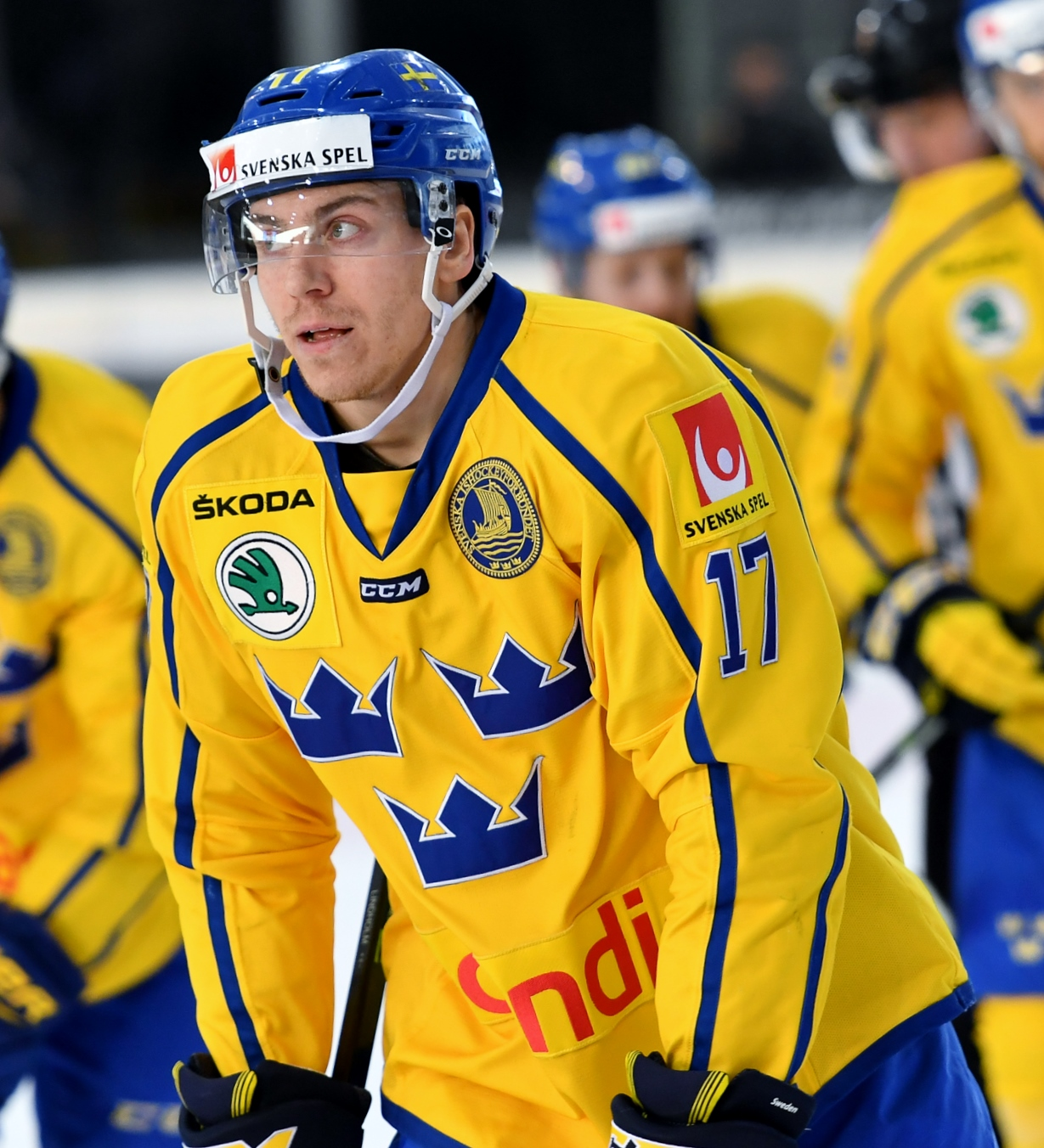
- Lindholm with Sweden in 2017
- Born: 5 October 1991 (age 34) Kusmark, Sweden
- Height: 183 cm (6 ft 0 in)
- Weight: 83 kg (183 lb; 13 st 1 lb)
- Position: Centre
- Shoots: Left
- SHL team Former teams: Skellefteå AIK; Toronto Maple Leafs; Winnipeg Jets; Boston Bruins; Ak Bars Kazan
- National team: Sweden
- NHL draft: Undrafted
- Playing career: 2009–present

Pär Lindholm (born 5 October 1991) is a Swedish professional ice hockey centre currently playing for Skellefteå AIK of the Swedish Hockey League (SHL).

== Playing career ==
Lindholm made his professional debut with Skellefteå AIK in the Elitserien during the 2009–10 Elitserien season.

In the 2017–18 season, Lindholm established himself as a dominant center in the Swedish Hockey League, scoring 47 points in 49 regular-season games as well as 11 points in 16 playoff games for finalists Skellefteå AIK.

On 17 May 2018, having gained NHL attention, Lindholm signed as an undrafted free agent to a one-year, entry-level contract with the Toronto Maple Leafs.

After attending the Maple Leafs' 2018 training camp, Lindholm made the opening night roster to begin the 2018–19 season. He made his NHL debut against traditional rivals the Montreal Canadiens in the Maple Leafs' 3–2 overtime victory on 3 October 2018. Playing as the Maple Leafs fourth-line center, Lindholm recorded his first career NHL goal on 13 October 2018 in a 4–2 win over the Washington Capitals. He appeared in every game for the Maple Leafs leading up to the trade deadline, contributing 12 points in 61 games before he was dealt to the Winnipeg Jets in exchange for Nic Petan on 25 February 2019.

On 1 July 2019, Lindholm joined his third NHL club, signing as a free agent to a two-year, $850,000 contract with the Boston Bruins. In the pandemic delayed 2020–21 season, having featured in just 1 regular season game with the Bruins, while predominantly serving as a healthy scratch, on February 14, 2021, Lindholm was placed on unconditional waivers for the purposes of contract termination by the Bruins after agreeing to a multi-year contract to return to his original Swedish club, Skellefteå AIK.

Upon completion of the 2020–21 season with Skellefteå AIK, having collected 6 points through 12 playoff games, Lindholm left the SHL in agreeing to a one-year contract with Russian club Ak Bars Kazan of the Kontinental Hockey League (KHL), on 19 May 2021. In the following 2021–22 season, Lindholm registered 7 goals and 12 assists for 19 points in just 29 regular season games.

After his contract with Ak Bars, Lindholm opted to leave Russia and return again to Skellefteå AIK of the SHL, agreeing to a three-year contract on 3 May 2022.

On 24 October 2024, Skellefteå announced that it had signed Lindholm to a two-year contract extension that runs through the 2026–27 season.

== Career statistics ==
=== Regular season and playoffs ===
			Regular season					Playoffs
Season	Team	League	GP	G	A	Pts	PIM	GP	G	A	Pts	PIM
2007–08	Skellefteå AIK	J18	15	7	2	9	4	—	—	—	—	—
2007–08	Skellefteå AIK	J18 Allsv	11	1	2	3	16	—	—	—	—	—
2008–09	Skellefteå AIK	J18	17	16	9	25	20	—	—	—	—	—
2008–09	Skellefteå AIK	J18 Allsv	14	9	17	26	65	9	4	4	8	8
2008–09	Skellefteå AIK	J20	4	0	1	1	4	—	—	—	—	—
2009–10	Skellefteå AIK	J20	32	12	12	24	28	3	0	3	3	6
2009–10	Skellefteå AIK	SEL	2	0	0	0	0	1	0	0	0	2
2010–11	Skellefteå AIK	J20	1	1	0	1	2	5	1	3	4	6
2010–11	Skellefteå AIK	SEL	1	0	0	0	0	3	0	0	0	0
2010–11	IF Sundsvall	Allsv	50	7	7	14	36	—	—	—	—	—
2011–12	IF Sundsvall	Allsv	52	7	7	14	24	—	—	—	—	—
2012–13	Piteå HC	Div.1	26	7	13	20	18	17	4	12	16	8
2013–14	Karlskrona HK	Allsv	52	13	29	42	42	6	1	3	4	2
2014–15	Skellefteå AIK	SHL	54	14	12	26	55	15	2	3	5	8
2015–16	Skellefteå AIK	SHL	52	6	9	15	26	16	3	1	4	8
2016–17	Skellefteå AIK	SHL	38	15	16	31	39	7	1	1	2	6
2017–18	Skellefteå AIK	SHL	49	18	29	47	28	16	6	5	11	16
2018–19	Toronto Maple Leafs	NHL	61	1	11	12	18	—	—	—	—	—
2018–19	Winnipeg Jets	NHL	4	0	1	1	0	2	0	0	0	0
2019–20	Boston Bruins	NHL	40	3	3	6	4	6	0	0	0	2
2020–21	Boston Bruins	NHL	1	0	0	0	0	—	—	—	—	—
2020–21	Skellefteå AIK	SHL	11	3	6	9	6	12	2	4	6	8
2021–22	Ak Bars Kazan	KHL	29	7	12	19	10	—	—	—	—	—
2022–23	Skellefteå AIK	SHL	50	12	19	31	67	17	2	3	5	14
2023–24	Skellefteå AIK	SHL	47	7	13	20	10	13	2	3	5	8
2024–25	Skellefteå AIK	SHL	50	7	16	23	22	11	4	5	9	10
SHL totals			354	82	120	202	253	111	22	25	47	80
NHL totals			106	4	15	19	22	8	0	0	0	2

=== International ===
Year	Team	Event	Result	GP	G	A	Pts	PIM
2018	Sweden	OG	5th	4	1	0	1	6
2021	Sweden	WC	9th	7	0	0	0	4
2023	Sweden	WC	6th	8	2	2	4	4
Senior totals				19	3	2	5	14

== Awards and honours ==
Award	Year
SHL
Le Mat Trophy	2024
