= Axel Wemmenborn =

Swedish ice hockey player

- Born: April 28, 1992 (age 33) Kristianstad, Sweden
- Height: 6 ft 0 in (183 cm)
- Weight: 194 lb (88 kg; 13 st 12 lb)
- Position: Center
- Shoots: Left
- Allsv team Former teams: IF Troja-Ljungby; Malmö Redhawks
- NHL draft: Undrafted
- Playing career: 2011–present

Axel Wemmenborn (born 28 April 1992) is a Swedish professional ice hockey forward, currently playing for IF Troja-Ljungby in the HockeyAllsvenskan (Allsv).

Wemmenborn has previously played with Malmö Redhawks of the Swedish Hockey League (SHL). Wemmenborn was born in Kristianstad, a city in Sweden. His youth team is Kristianstads IK.
