= 2013 Karjala Tournament =

2013 Karjala Tournament (Euro Hockey Games)
Tournament details
- Host countries: Finland; Sweden
- Cities: Helsinki; Gävle
- Venues: 2 (in 2 host cities)
- Dates: 7–10 November 2013
- Teams: 4

Final positions
- Champions: Finland (11th title)
- Runners-up: Russia
- Third place: Sweden
- Fourth place: Czech Republic

Tournament statistics
- Games played: 6
- Goals scored: 32 (5.33 per game)
- Attendance: 52,606 (8,768 per game)
- Scoring leader: (Sweden) Pär Arlbrandt (4 points)

The 2013 Karjala Tournament was played between 7 and 10 November 2013. The Czech Republic, Finland, Sweden and Russia played a round-robin for a total of three games per team and six games in total. Five of the matches were played in the Hartwall Areena in Helsinki, Finland, and one match in the Läkeröl Arena in Gävle, Sweden. The tournament was won by Finland. The tournament was part of 2013–14 Euro Hockey Tour.

== Standings ==
Pos	Team	Pld	W	OTW	OTL	L	GF	GA	GD	Pts
1	Finland	3	2	0	1	0	9	8	+1	7
2	Russia	3	2	0	0	1	10	6	+4	6
3	Sweden	3	1	1	0	1	11	7	+4	5
4	Czech Republic	3	0	0	0	3	2	11	−9	0

Source: Swehockey

== Games ==
All times are local. Helsinki – (Eastern European Time – UTC+2) Gävle – (Central European Time – UTC+1)

7 November 2013; 18:30	Russia	3-4 (1-1, 1-2, 1-1)	Finland	Hartwall Arena, Helsinki; Attendance: 9,883

Game reference

Konstantin Barulin
Goalies
Jussi Rynnäs
Referees:
(Sweden) Marcus Linde
(Sweden) Tobias Björk
Linesmen:
(Finland) Henri Neva
(Finland) Pasi Nieminen

	0-1	09:01 – Juuso Hietanen (PP)
03:45 – Yuri Aleksandrov (Aleksandr Popov, Ilya Nikulin)	1-1
20:48 – Mikhail Varnakov (Maksim Chudinov, Evgeni Medvedev) (PP)	2-1
	2-2	22:21 – Oskar Osala (Teemu Hartikainen)
	2-3	26:49 – Leo Komarov (Antti Pihlström, Teemu Laakso)
45:43 – Egor Averin	3-3
	3-4	53:52 – Sakari Salminen (Tuukka Mäntylä, Jere Karalahti)

6 min
Penalties
8 min
23
Shots
32

7 November 2013; 19:00	Sweden	6–0 (3–0, 2–0, 1–0)	Czech Republic	Läkeröl Arena, Gävle; Attendance: 4,775

Game reference

Henrik Karlsson
Goalies
Jakub Štěpánek Jakub Kovář
Referees:
(Russia) Roman Gofman
(Russia) Aleksei Anisimov
Linesmen:
(Sweden) Jimmy Dahmén
(Sweden) Henrik Pihlblad

03:54 – Linus Klasen (Martin Thörnberg, Daniel Rahimi)	1-0
16:03 – Simon Hjalmarsson (Pär Arlbrandt, David Ullström)	2-0
16:32 – Pär Arlbrandt (Johan Alm, Daniel Rahimi)	3-0
27:49 – Linus Klasen (John Klingberg, Oscar Möller) (PP)	4-0
32:18 – Simon Hjalmarsson (Pär Arlbrandt, David Ullström)	5-0
58:37 – Martin Thörnberg	6-0

6 min
Penalties
6 min
23
Shots
30

9 November 2013; 12:30	Sweden	2–5 (0–2, 1–2, 1–1)	Russia	Hartwall Arena, Helsinki; Attendance: 7,729

Game reference

David Rautio
Goalies
Aleksandr Eremenko
Referees:
(Finland) Antti Boman
(Finland) Petri Lindqvist
Linesmen:
(Finland) Sakari Suominen
(Finland) Masi Puolakka

	0-1	01:51 – Artemi Panarin (Evgeni Medvedev)
	0-2	10:18 – Enver Lisin (Viktor Tikhonov)
	0-3	21:20 – Egor Averin (Enver Lisin)
35:58 – Oscar Möller (Nicklas Danielsson) (PP)	1-3
	1-4	36:21 – Ilya Nikulin (Andrei Zubarev) (PP)
	1-5	54:41 – Enver Lisin (Viktor Tikhonov, Aleksei Tereshchenko)
59:59 – David Ullström (Oscar Möller, Nicklas Danielsson) (PP)	2-5

8 min
Penalties
12 min
30
Shots
23

9 November 2013; 16:30	Finland	3–2 (0–1, 1–1, 2–0)	Czech Republic	Hartwall Arena, Helsinki; Attendance: 11,801

Game reference

Niko Hovinen
Goalies
Jakub Kovár
Referees:
(Sweden) Marcus Linde
(Sweden) Tobias Björk
Linesmen:
(Finland) Jani Pesonen
(Finland) Joonas Saha

	0-1	13:40 – Jakub Petružálek (Zdenek Kutlák) (PP)
	0-2	22:37 – Jan Kovár (Tomáš Kaberle, Václav Nedorost) (PP)
36:08 – Petri Kontiola (Juhamatti Aaltonen)	1-2
44:21 – Mika Pyörälä (Sami Lepistö, Petri Kontiola)	2-2
54:45 – Jori Lehterä (Jonas Enlund, Topi Jaakola)	3-2

31 min
Penalties
31 min
25
Shots
19

10 November 2013; 12:30	Czech Republic	0–2 (0–0, 0–0, 0–2)	Russia	Hartwall Arena, Helsinki; Attendance: 6,777

Game reference
Jakub Kovár	Goalies	leksandr Eremenko	Referees: (Finland) Stefan Fonselius (Finland) Mikko Kaukokari; Linesmen: (Finland) Markus Hägerström (Finland) Masi Puolakka
0-1 / 40:34 – Aleksandr Popov (Aleksandr Perezhogin); 0-2 / 41:08 – Mikhail Varnakov (Aleksandr Burmistrov, Artemi Panarin)			Referees: (Finland) Stefan Fonselius (Finland) Mikko Kaukokari; Linesmen: (Finland) Markus Hägerström (Finland) Masi Puolakka
14 min	Penalties	6 min	Referees: (Finland) Stefan Fonselius (Finland) Mikko Kaukokari; Linesmen: (Finland) Markus Hägerström (Finland) Masi Puolakka
23	Shots	29	Referees: (Finland) Stefan Fonselius (Finland) Mikko Kaukokari; Linesmen: (Finland) Markus Hägerström (Finland) Masi Puolakka

10 November 2013; 16:30	Finland	2–3 OT (0–1, 1–1, 1–0) (OT: 0–1)	Sweden	Hartwall Arena, Helsinki; Attendance: 11,641

Game reference

Niko Hovinen
Goalies
Henrik Karlsson
Referees:
(Czech Republic) Pavel Hodek
(Czech Republic) Jan Hribik
Linesmen:
(Finland) Iika Kiilunen
(Finland) Sakari Suominen

	0-1	17:39 – Pär Arlbrandt (Niklas Olausson , Nicklas Danielsson) (PP)
	0-2	28:17 – Linus Klasen (David Ullström) (PP)
34:35 – Jere Karalahti (Jori Lehterä, Sakari Salminen) (PP)	1-2
56:52 – Niklas Hagman (Jarkko Immonen, Jere Karalahti)	2-2
	2-3	61:48 – Sebastian Erixon (Simon Hjalmarsson, John Klingberg

31 min
Penalties
10 min
37
Shots
32

== Scoring leaders ==
Pos	Player	Country	GP	G	A	Pts	+/−	PIM	POS
1	Pär Arlbrandt	Sweden	3	2	2	4	+3	0	LW
2	David Ullström	Sweden	3	1	3	4	+4	4	CE
3	Linus Klasen	Sweden	3	3	0	3	+2	0	RW
4	Enver Lisin	Russia	3	2	1	3	+4	0	RW
5	Simon Hjalmarsson	Sweden	3	2	1	3	+4	0	LW

GP = Games played; G = Goals; A = Assists; Pts = Points; +/− = Plus/minus; PIM = Penalties in minutes; POS = Position
Source: swehockey

== Goaltending leaders ==
Pos	Player	Country	TOI	GA	GAA	Sv%	SO
1	Henrik Karlsson	Sweden	121:48	2	0.99	97.01	1
2	Alexander Yeryomenko	Russia	XXX:XX	2	1.00	96.23	1
3	Niko Hovinen	Finland	121:48	5	2.46	90.20	0
4	Jakub Kovář	Czech Republic	151:12	7	2.78	89.55	0
5	Jussi Rynnäs	Finland	60:00	3	3.00	86.96	0
6	David Rautio	Sweden	60:00	5	5.00	78.26	0

TOI = Time on ice (minutes:seconds); SA = Shots against; GA = Goals against; GAA = Goals Against Average; Sv% = Save percentage; SO = Shutouts
Source: swehockey

== Tournament awards ==
The tournament directorate named the following players in the tournament 2013:

- Best goalkeeper: (Sweden) Henrik Karlsson
- Best defenceman: (Russia) Andrei Zubarev
- Best forward: (Finland) Petri Kontiola

Media All-Star Team:

- Goaltender: (Sweden) Henrik Karlsson
- Defence: (Finland) Lasse Kukkonen, (Russia) Andrei Zubarev
- Forwards: (Sweden) Pär Arlbrandt, (Finland) Petri Kontiola, (Russia) Enver Lisin
