= Jan Sandström =

Jan Sandström may refer to:

- Jan Sandström (composer) (born 1954)
- Jan Sandström (ice hockey) (born 1978)
