= Linus Persson =

Linus Persson may refer to:

- Linus Persson (ice hockey) (born 1985), Swedish ice hockey right winger
- Linus Persson (handballer) (born 1993), Swedish handball player
