= 2012–13 Elitserien season =

- League: Elitserien
- Sport: Ice hockey
- Duration: 13 September 2012 – 18 April 2013
- Number of games: 55 (330 total)
- Number of teams: 12
- Total attendance: 1,883,192
- Average attendance: 5,707

Regular season
- League champion: Skellefteå AIK
- Season MVP: Jimmie Ericsson (Skellefteå AIK)
- Top scorer: Bud Holloway (Skellefteå AIK)

Playoffs
- Playoffs MVP: Oscar Lindberg (Skellefteå AIK)

Finals
- Champions: Skellefteå AIK
- Runners-up: Luleå HF

Elitserien seasons
- ← 2011–12 2013–14 →

The 2012–13 Elitserien season was the 38th season of Elitserien. The regular season began on 13 September 2012 and ended on 5 March 2013. The playoffs began on 12 March 2013 and ended on 18 April 2013. The 2012–13 Elitserien season was the last season under the name "Elitserien"; on 17 June 2013, the league was renamed "Swedish Hockey League" (SHL).

Skellefteå AIK clinched the Swedish Championship for the first time since 1978, defeating Luleå HF 4–0 in the Finals. It was the team's second Swedish Championship in club history. Skellefteå also won the regular season for the first time since the 1980–81 season, and the second time in club history. Their 114-point finish is the highest number of points since Färjestad BK won the 2001–02 regular season with 118 points. Luleå HF improved on the record for fewest goals surrendered in a 55-game regular season that they set last season by only having 102 goals scored against them.

In Kvalserien, Örebro HK (first SHL season) and Leksands IF qualified for the 2013–14 SHL season at the expense of Timrå IK and Rögle BK.

== Participating teams ==
Location of the participating clubs

Team	City	Arena	Capacity
AIK	Stockholm	Hovet	8,094
Brynäs IF	Gävle	Läkerol Arena	8,585
Frölunda HC	Gothenburg	Scandinavium	12,044
Färjestad BK	Karlstad	Löfbergs Lila Arena	8,647
HV71	Jönköping	Kinnarps Arena	7,000
Linköpings HC	Linköping	Cloetta Center	8,500
Luleå HF	Luleå	Coop Norrbotten Arena	6,300
Modo Hockey	Örnsköldsvik	Fjällräven Center	7,600
Rögle BK	Ängelholm	Lindab Arena	5,150
Skellefteå AIK	Skellefteå	Skellefteå Kraft Arena	6,001
Timrå IK	Timrå	E.ON Arena	6,000
Växjö Lakers	Växjö	Vida Arena	5,700

- Note: Frölunda HC played their final three home games of the regular season in Frölundaborg, which had a smaller capacity of 7,600 spectators.

== Summary ==
=== Short-term contracts ===
Short-term contracts and the possibility of signing players affected by the 2012–13 NHL lockout was a controversial issue for several months. The board of hockey operations for Elitserien (Hockeyligan) decided to continue rejecting short-term contracts (i.e. contracts not lasting for the entire season) on 23 August 2012. On 21 September 2012, the Swedish Competition Authority (SCA) examined the matter and responded with a ruling that allowed short-term contracts. Hockeyligan appealed the SCA ruling to the Market Court. On 18 December 2012, the Market Court ruled against the SCA and allowed Hockeyligan to forbid short-term contracts. The uncertainty and concerns of legal punishment caused a number of Elitserien clubs to refrain from signing short-term contracts and await the Market Court's decision. In the end, Cody Franson played 26 Elitserien games with Brynäs, Alexander Steen played 20 games with Modo, and Matt Duchene played 19 games and Viktor Stålberg 11 games with Frölunda before their short-term contracts expired.

=== Outdoor game ===
For the fourth consecutive season, an outdoor game was played. As part of Brynäs IF celebrating their 100th year as a club, they hosted Timrå IK on December 8, 2012, in a temporary arena called Gävlebocken ("Gävle Goat") Arena. Brynäs won the game 3–0 in front of 15,009 spectators.

=== Decline in attendance ===
The average attendance in Elitserien fell by 10.5% from 6,385 to 5,717 spectators per game, the lowest average since the 2002–03 season. The drop meant that Elitserien was fifth in average attendance among professional ice hockey leagues (fourth in Europe) – after the NHL, NLA, DEL and KHL. In the 2011–12 season, Elitserien had the second highest average attendance among professional hockey leagues (first in Europe).

There were several reasons for the decline; Frölunda HC saw an 18.1% decrease to an average of 8,588 fans per game. The second most attended team last season, Djurgårdens IF, was relegated to HockeyAllsvenskan. Nine of the eleven returning teams from last season had lower attendance numbers, with Skellefteå AIK and Luleå HF being the only teams to increase their average attendance. HockeyAllsvenskan, on the other hand, improved its attendance average this season from 2,606 to 3,227 spectators per game, an improvement of 23.8% from the 2011–12 season.

== Regular season ==
=== Standings ===
2012–13 Elitserien season	GP	W	L	OTW	OTL	GF	GA	GD	Pts
Skellefteå AIK^{y}	55	34	13	4	4	170	107	63	114
Färjestad BK^{x}	55	27	14	7	7	155	110	45	102
Luleå HF^{x}	55	25	12	9	9	145	102	43	102
HV71^{x}	55	27	16	9	3	155	124	31	102
Linköpings HC^{x}	55	27	19	4	5	145	136	9	94
Frölunda HC^{x}	55	21	21	8	5	123	126	–3	84
Modo Hockey^{x}	55	19	19	7	10	135	129	6	81
Brynäs IF^{x}	55	17	20	6	12	123	166	–43	75
AIK^{e}	55	16	25	7	7	123	149	–26	69
Växjö Lakers HC^{e}	55	14	26	7	8	102	130	–28	64
Timrå IK^{r}	55	12	30	8	5	100	127	–27	57
Rögle BK^{r}	55	10	34	5	6	104	174	–70	46

x – clinched playoff spot; y – clinched regular season league title; e – eliminated from playoff contention; r – play in relegation series

=== Statistics ===
==== Scoring leaders ====
Updated as of the end of the regular season.
GP = Games played; G = Goals; A = Assists; Pts = Points; +/– = Plus/minus; PIM = Penalty minutes

Player	Team	GP	G	A	Pts	+/–	PIM
(Canada) Bud Holloway	Skellefteå AIK	55	20	51	71	+25	36
(Sweden) Carl Söderberg	Linköpings HC	54	31	29	60	+18	48
(Sweden) Joakim Lindström	Skellefteå AIK	53	18	36	54	+11	56
(Sweden) Pär Arlbrandt	Linköpings HC	54	21	32	53	+25	28
(United States) Broc Little	AIK	55	16	30	46	–3	24
(Canada) Jason Krog	HV71	55	17	26	43	+16	18
(Sweden) Simon Hjalmarsson	Linköpings HC	55	12	31	43	+21	10
(Sweden) Oscar Lindberg	Skellefteå AIK	55	17	25	42	+1	54
(Sweden) Calle Järnkrok	Brynäs IF	53	13	29	42	–2	12
(Canada) Chris Lee	Färjestad BK	54	12	29	41	+20	30

==== Leading goaltenders ====
These are the leaders in GAA among goaltenders who have played at least 40% of the team's minutes. Updated as of the end of the regular season.

GP = Games played; TOI = Time on ice (minutes); GA = Goals against; SO = Shutouts; Sv% = Save percentage; GAA = Goals against average

Player	Team	GP	TOI	GA	SO	Sv%	GAA
(Czech Republic) Alexander Salák	Färjestad BK	41	2452:44	66	7	.939	1.61
(Sweden) Joacim Eriksson	Skellefteå AIK	30	1726:17	48	5	.931	1.67
(Sweden) Johan Gustafsson	Luleå HF	33	2016:10	57	4	.933	1.70
(Sweden) Christian Engstrand	Linköpings HC	34	1934:05	61	6	.936	1.89
(Slovakia) Július Hudáček	Frölunda HC	48	2894:00	91	5	.930	1.89
(Sweden) Joakim Lundström	Timrå IK	25	1506:57	50	2	.927	1.99
(Sweden) Gustaf Wesslau	HV71	43	2522:35	84	7	.928	2.00
(Sweden) Markus Svensson	Skellefteå AIK	27	1587:22	54	3	.920	2.04
(Austria) Bernhard Starkbaum	Modo Hockey	46	2625:43	90	8	.933	2.06
(Finland) Fredrik Norrena	Växjö Lakers	46	2725:19	95	6	.919	2.09

==== Regular season attendance ====
Rk	Team	Home			Away			Total		
Rk	Team	GP	Total	Average	GP	Total	Average	GP	Total	Average
1	Frölunda HC	27	231,860	8,588	28	155,188	5,542	55	387,058	7,037
2	HV71	27	182,788	6,770	28	163,771	5,849	55	346,559	6,301
3	Linköpings HC	28	176,030	6,287	27	144,084	5,336	55	320,114	5,820
4	Brynäs IF	28	174,419	6,229	27	166,064	6,151	55	340,483	6,191
5	Färjestad BK	27	167,633	6,209	28	158,586	5,664	55	326,219	5,931
6	MODO	27	158,880	5,884	28	169,388	6,050	55	328,268	5,969
7	Skellefteå AIK	28	145,528	5,197	27	155,173	5,747	55	300,701	5,467
8	Luleå HF	27	139,969	5,184	28	158,814	5,672	55	298,783	5,432
9	Växjö Lakers HC	28	141,182	5,042	27	144,426	5,349	55	285,608	5,193
10	AIK	27	134,951	4,998	28	157,179	5,614	55	292,130	5,311
11	Timrå IK	28	121,137	4,326	27	162,826	6,031	55	283,963	5,163
12	Rögle BK	28	108,805	3,886	27	147,693	5,470	55	256,498	4,664
League		330	1,883,192	5,707						

== Playoffs ==
=== Playoff bracket ===
In the first round, the highest remaining seed chose which of the four lowest remaining seeds to be matched against. In the second round, the highest remaining seed is matched against the lowest remaining seed. In each round the higher-seeded team is awarded home ice advantage. Each best-of-seven series follows an alternating home team format: the higher-seeded team will play at home for games 1 and 3 (plus 5 and 7 if necessary), and the lower-seeded team will be at home for game 2, 4 and 6 (if necessary).

Quarterfinals
1	**Skellefteå AIK**	**4**
8	Brynäs IF	0
2	**Färjestad BK**	**4**
7	Modo Hockey	1
(Pairings are reseeded after the first round)
3	**Luleå HF**	**4**
6	Frölunda HC	2
4	HV71	1
5	**Linköpings HC**	**4**

Semifinals
1	**Skellefteå AIK**	**4**
5	Linköpings HC	1
2	Färjestad BK	1
3	**Luleå HF**	**4**

Finals
1	**Skellefteå AIK**	**4**
3	Luleå HF	0

=== Quarterfinals ===
==== (1) Skellefteå AIK vs. (8) Brynäs IF ====
March 12	**Skellefteå AIK**	**5–0**	Brynäs IF	Skellefteå Kraft Arena	Recap
No scoring		**First period**	No scoring
Martin Ševc 1 - 17:00; Bud Holloway 1 - 17:59		**Second period**	No scoring
Petter Emanuelsson 1 - pp - 10:56; Petter Emanuelsson 2 - 12:15; Bud Holloway 2 - 14:12		**Third period**	No scoring
Joacim Eriksson 14 saves / 14 shots		**Goalie stats**	Johan Holmqvist 36 saves / 41 shots

March 14	Brynäs IF	**3–7**	**Skellefteå AIK**	Läkerol Arena	Recap
No scoring		**First period**	0:59 - Erik Forssell 1; 18:58 - Pontus Petterström 1
No scoring		**Second period**	7:41 - pp - Niclas Burström 1; 18:12 - pp - Bud Holloway 3
Ryan Gunderson 1 - 7:02; Sebastian Lauritzen 1 - pp - 12:15; Daniel Widing 1 - 14:30		**Third period**	5:56 - Joakim Lindström 1; 13:36 - pp - Jimmie Ericsson 1; 15:56 - en - Erik Forssell 2
Johan Holmqvist 22 saves / 26 shots Robin Rahm 4 saves / 7 shots		**Goalie stats**	Markus Svensson 31 saves / 34 shots

March 16	**Skellefteå AIK**	**4–1**	Brynäs IF	Skellefteå Kraft Arena	Recap
No scoring		**First period**	No scoring
Joakim Lindström 2 - pp - 15:20		**Second period**	11:54 - Daniel Widing 2
Erik Forssell 3 - 9:49; Oscar Möller 1 - 17:11; Melker Karlsson 1 - en - 18:53		**Third period**	No scoring
Joacim Eriksson 21 saves / 22 shots		**Goalie stats**	Johan Holmqvist 41 saves / 45 shots

March 18	Brynäs IF	**0–4**	**Skellefteå AIK**	Läkerol Arena	Recap
No scoring		**First period**	No scoring
No scoring		**Second period**	8:49 - pp - Viktor Arvidsson 1; 10:33 - Oscar Lindberg 1
No scoring		**Third period**	2:21 - Viktor Arvidsson 2; 16:11 - en - Oscar Möller 2
Johan Holmqvist 29 saves / 33 shots		**Goalie stats**	Markus Svensson 32 saves / 32 shots

**Skellefteå AIK won series 4–0**

==== (2) Färjestad BK vs. (7) Modo Hockey ====
March 12	**Färjestad BK**	**4–2**	Modo Hockey	Löfbergs Lila Arena	Recap
Per Åslund 1 - 4:58		**First period**	8:31 - Niklas Sundström 1; 10:04 - Marcel Mueller 1
Chris Lee 1 - pp - 7:13		**Second period**	No scoring
Per Åslund 2 - pp - 2:33; Marius Holtet 1 - 10:06		**Third period**	No scoring
Alexander Salák 24 saves / 26 shots		**Goalie stats**	Bernhard Starkbaum 29 saves / 33 shots

March 14	Modo Hockey	**3–5**	**Färjestad BK**	Fjällräven Center	Recap
Mattias Ritola 1 - 9:23		**First period**	12:34 - Joakim Hillding 1
Per-Åge Skrøder 1 - pp - 12:11; Niklas Sundström 2 - 15:08		**Second period**	9:36 - pp - Chris Lee 2; 16:26 - Patrik Lundh 1
No scoring		**Third period**	11:48 - Chris Lee 3; 18:50 - en - Anders Bastiansen 1
Bernhard Starkbaum 25 saves / 30 shots		**Goalie stats**	Alexander Salák 26 saves / 29 shots

March 16	**Färjestad BK**	**2–1**	Modo Hockey	Löfbergs Lila Arena	Recap
Rickard Wallin 1 - 5:19		**First period**	12:02 - pp - Per-Åge Skrøder 2
Chris Lee 4 - 2:19		**Second period**	No scoring
No scoring		**Third period**	No scoring
Alexander Salák 32 saves / 33 shots		**Goalie stats**	Bernhard Starkbaum 27 saves / 29 shots

March 18	**Modo Hockey**	5–4	**OT**	Färjestad BK	Fjällräven Center	Recap
No scoring		First period		2:50 - Chris Lee 5; 3:09 - Anders Bastiansen 2
Mattias Ritola 2 - 1:44; Kyle Cumiskey 1 - pp - 7:44		Second period		0:25 - pp - Marius Holtet 2
Marcel Mueller 2 - pp - 9:44; Jonas Ahnelöv 1 - 16:20		Third period		8:41 - Marius Holtet 3
Ladislav Nagy 1 - 5:01		First overtime period		No scoring
Bernhard Starkbaum 0 saves / 2 shots Linus Ullmark 25 saves / 27 shots		Goalie stats		Alexander Salák 34 saves / 39 shots

March 20	**Färjestad BK**	1–0	**OT**	Modo Hockey	Löfbergs Lila Arena	Recap
No scoring		First period		No scoring
No scoring		Second period		No scoring
No scoring		Third period		No scoring
Rickard Wallin 2 - 0:57		First overtime period		No scoring
Alexander Salák 26 saves / 26 shots		Goalie stats		Linus Ullmark 39 saves / 40 shots

**Färjestad BK won series 4–1**

==== (3) Luleå HF vs. (6) Frölunda HC ====
March 13	**Luleå HF**	**5–2**	Frölunda HC	Coop Norrbotten Arena	Recap
Sami Sandell 1 - 0:31; Jan Sandström 1 - 12:51		**First period**	6:19 - Fredrik Eriksson 1
Linus Persson 1 - 2:49; Linus Klasen 1 - 10:32		**Second period**	11:07 - pp - Joel Lundqvist 1
Joonas Vihko 1 en - 18:23		**Third period**	No scoring
Johan Gustafsson 13 saves / 15 shots		**Goalie stats**	Július Hudáček 26 saves / 31 shots

March 15	**Frölunda HC**	**2–0**	Luleå HF	Scandinavium	Recap
Magnus Kahnberg 1 - pp - 10:44; Fabian Brunnström 1 - 11:07		**First period**	No scoring
No scoring		**Second period**	No scoring
No scoring		**Third period**	No scoring
Július Hudáček 34 saves / 34 shots		**Goalie stats**	Johan Gustafsson 19 saves / 21 shots

March 17	**Luleå HF**	**3–1**	Frölunda HC	Coop Norrbotten Arena	Recap
Karl Fabricius 1 - pp - 10:31; Daniel Gunnarsson 1 - pp - 19:20		**First period**	No scoring
No scoring		**Second period**	No scoring
Linus Klasen 2 - pp - 5:03		**Third period**	13:55 - Joel Lundqvist 2
Johan Gustafsson 20 saves / 21 shots		**Goalie stats**	Július Hudáček 25 saves / 28 shots

March 19	**Frölunda HC**	4–3	**2OT**	Luleå HF	Scandinavium	Recap
Christian Bäckman 1 - pp - 12:19		First period		15:59 - Jan Sandström 2
Magnus Kahnberg 2 - pp - 17:57		Second period		No scoring
Joel Lundqvist 3 - 0:21		Third period		7:44 - Niklas Fogström 1; 8:08 - Chris Abbott 1
Mathis Olimb 1 - 14:58		Second overtime period		No scoring
Július Hudáček 46 saves / 49 shots		Goalie stats		Johan Gustafsson 36 saves / 40 shots

March 21	**Luleå HF**	**4–1**	Frölunda HC	Coop Norrbotten Arena	Recap
Peter Cehlarik 1 - 12:01		**First period**	No scoring
No scoring		**Second period**	No scoring
Linus Persson 2 - 13:49; Linus Persson 3 - en - 19:26; Niklas Olausson 1 - en - 19:52		**Third period**	16:55 - Brendan Bell 1
Johan Gustafsson 28 saves / 29 shots		**Goalie stats**	Július Hudáček 27 saves / 31 shots

March 23	Frölunda HC	**2–4**	**Luleå HF**	Scandinavium	Recap
No scoring		**First period**	5:20 - Chris Abbott 2; 13:21 - pp - Daniel Gunnarsson 2
Jari Tolsa 1 - pp - 9:58		**Second period**	3:53 - Toni Koivisto 1
Henrik Tömmernes 1 - 17:49		**Third period**	18:17 - en - Daniel Mannberg 1
Július Hudáček 15 saves / 19 shots		**Goalie stats**	Johan Gustafsson 33 saves / 35 shots

**Luleå HF won series 4–2**

==== (4) HV71 vs. (5) Linköpings HC ====
March 13	**HV71**	**6–0**	Linköpings HC	Kinnarps Arena	Recap
Mats Trygg 1 - 2:10; Anton Bengtsson 1 - 16:16		**First period**	No scoring
Rhett Rakhshani 1 - 2:19; Elias Fälth 1 - 17:45		**Second period**	No scoring
Mats Trygg 2 - 10:57; Johan Lindström 1 - 14:14		**Third period**	No scoring
Gustaf Wesslau 19 saves / 19 shots		**Goalie stats**	Christian Engstrand 16 saves / 20 shots Andreas Andersson 11 saves / 13 shots

March 15	**Linköpings HC**	**6–1**	HV71	Cloetta Center	Recap
Sebastian Karlsson 1 - sh - 11:29; Mattias Bäckman 1 - pp - 16:31; Simon Hjalmarsson 1 - pp - 17:14		**First period**	14:19 - sh - Patrik Carlsson 1
Magnus Johansson 1 - 3:52		**Second period**	No scoring
Daniel Grillfors 1 - en - 15:14; Pär Arlbrandt 1 - en - 17:27		**Third period**	No scoring
Christian Engstrand 31 saves / 32 shots		**Goalie stats**	Gustaf Wesslau 26 saves / 32 shots

March 17	HV71	4–5	**OT**	**Linköpings HC**	Kinnarps Arena	Recap
Jesper Fasth 1 - 2:45		First period		7:57 - Pär Arlbrandt 2
David Petrasek 1 - 4:16; Per Ledin 1 - 6:33; Jason Krog 1 - pp - 7:57		Second period		0:52 - Robin Figren 1; 12:23 - Robin Figren 2
No scoring		Third period		1:16 - sh - Lee Goren 1
No scoring		First overtime period		5:40 - ps - Pär Arlbrandt 3
Gustaf Wesslau 19 saves / 24 shots		Goalie stats		Christian Engstrand 34 saves / 38 shots

March 19	**Linköpings HC**	5–4	**OT**	HV71	Cloetta Center	Recap
Robin Figren 3 - 14:03		First period		2:43 - Johan Lindström 2; 18:27 - Andreas Jämtin 1
Johannes Salmonsson 1 - sh - 7:22; Magnus Johansson 2 - pp - 14:27		Second period		4:16 - Johan Lindström 3; 15:24 - Patrik Carlsson 2
Lee Goren 2 - 19:09		Third period		No scoring
Simon Hjalmarsson 2 - 2:27		First overtime period		No scoring
Christian Engstrand 5 saves / 6 shots Andreas Andersson 10 saves / 13 shots		Goalie stats		Gustaf Wesslau 19 saves / 24 shots

March 21	HV71	**1–6**	**Linköpings HC**	Kinnarps Arena	Recap
No scoring		**First period**	5:04 - Robin Figren 4; 11:37 - Johannes Salmonsson 2; 12:44 - Pär Arlbrandt 4
No scoring		**Second period**	9:44 - pp - Patrik Zackrisson 1; 10:32 - ps - Pär Arlbrandt 5
Patrik Carlsson 3 - 6:51		**Third period**	16:48 - en - Simon Hjalmarsson 3
Gustaf Wesslau 4 saves / 7 shots Jonas Gunnarsson 5 saves / 8 shots		**Goalie stats**	Andreas Andersson 34 saves / 35 shots

**Linköpings HC won series 4–1**

=== Semifinals ===
==== (1) Skellefteå AIK vs. (5) Linköpings HC ====
Skellefteå won the series 4–1 and advanced to the Finals for the third year in a row, becoming the first team to achieve this feat since HV71 between 2008–2010.

March 28	Skellefteå AIK	2–3	**OT**	**Linköpings HC**	Skellefteå Kraft Arena	Recap
Oscar Möller 3 - 3:51		First period		No scoring
Joakim Lindström 3 - pp - 4:55		Second period		No scoring
No scoring		Third period		3:07 - Patrik Zackrisson 2; 13:52 - sh - Sebastian Karlsson 2
No scoring		First overtime period		15:18 - Erik Lindhagen 1
Markus Svensson 33 saves / 36 shots		Goalie stats		Christian Engstrand 36 saves / 38 shots

March 30	Linköpings HC	2–3	**OT**	**Skellefteå AIK**	Cloetta Center	Recap
Mattias Bäckman 2 - 7:34; Carl Söderberg 1 - sh - 9:24		First period		10:33 - pp - Oscar Lindberg 2
No scoring		Second period		No scoring
No scoring		Third period		19:28 - Viktor Arvidsson 3
No scoring		First overtime period		6:43 - John Klingberg 1
Christian Engstrand 30 saves / 33 shots		Goalie stats		Joacim Eriksson 17 saves / 19 shots

April 1	**Skellefteå AIK**	3–2	**OT**	Linköpings HC	Skellefteå Kraft Arena	Recap
No scoring		First period		No scoring
Viktor Arvidsson 4 - 4:15		Second period		12:38 - sh - Magnus Johansson 3; 13:52 - Pär Arlbrandt 6
Petter Emanuelsson 3 - 9:11		Third period		No scoring
Oscar Lindberg 3 - 3:27		First overtime period		No scoring
Joacim Eriksson 18 saves / 20 shots		Goalie stats		Christian Engstrand 44 saves / 47 shots

April 3	Linköpings HC	2–3	**OT**	**Skellefteå AIK**	Cloetta Center	Recap
No scoring		First period		No scoring
No scoring		Second period		5:31 - Petter Emanuelsson 4; 16:29 - Joakim Lindström 4
Simon Hjalmarsson 4 - 0:27; Simon Hjalmarsson 5 - 19:11		Third period		No scoring
No scoring		First overtime period		4:48 - Oscar Lindberg 4
Christian Engstrand 24 saves / 27 shots		Goalie stats		Joacim Eriksson 25 saves / 27 shots

April 5	**Skellefteå AIK**	**3–1**	Linköpings HC	Skellefteå Kraft Arena	Recap
Oscar Möller 4 - 19:43		**First period**	No scoring
No scoring		**Second period**	9:34 - pp - Pär Arlbrandt 7
Petter Emanuelsson 5 - 12:12; Jimmie Ericsson 2 - 17:00		**Third period**	No scoring
Joacim Eriksson 14 saves / 15 shots		**Goalie stats**	Christian Engstrand 32 saves / 35 shots

**Skellefteå AIK won series 4–1**

==== (2) Färjestad BK vs. (3) Luleå HF ====
Luleå won the series 4–1 and advanced to the Finals for the first time since winning the Swedish Championship in 1996. Linus Persson's game-deciding goal in Game 4, 12 seconds into overtime, is a new record for the fastest overtime goal scored in Elitserien playoff history.

March 29	Färjestad BK	**1–4**	**Luleå HF**	Löfbergs Lila Arena	Recap
No scoring		**First period**	12:10 - pp - Anton Hedman 1
Chris Lee 6 - 7:50		**Second period**	2:31 - Toni Koivisto 2; 15:15 - pp - Linus Klasen 3
No scoring		**Third period**	18:58 - en - Chris Abbott 3
Alexander Salák 24 saves / 28 shots		**Goalie stats**	Johan Gustafsson 26 saves / 27 shots

March 31	**Luleå HF**	**5–2**	Färjestad BK	Coop Norrbotten Arena	Recap
Cam Abbott 1 - 13:46		**First period**	9:55 - Christian Berglund 1
Joonas Vihko 2 - pp - 1:12; Jan Sandström 3 - pp - 1:56; Cam Abbott 2 - 6:39		**Second period**	2:36 - pp - Mikael Johansson 1
Mika Pyörälä 1 - en - 18:59		**Third period**	No scoring
Johan Gustafsson 17 saves / 19 shots		**Goalie stats**	Alexander Salák 22 saves / 27 shots

April 2	**Färjestad BK**	**4–1**	Luleå HF	Löfbergs Lila Arena	Recap
Anders Bastiansen 3 - 18:26; Chris Lee 7 - 19:33		**First period**	No scoring
No scoring		**Second period**	9:54 - pp - Linus Persson 4
Mikael Johansson 2 - 1:15; Patrik Lundh 2 - 11:38		**Third period**	No scoring
Alexander Salák 30 saves / 31 shots		**Goalie stats**	Johan Gustafsson 16 saves / 20 shots

April 4	**Luleå HF**	3–2	**OT**	Färjestad BK	Coop Norrbotten Arena	Recap
No scoring		First period		2:07 - Anton Grundel 1
Karl Fabricius 2 - 1:16; Jens Jakobs 1 - 4:49		Second period		9:24 - pp - Christian Berglund 2
No scoring		Third period		No scoring
Linus Persson 5 - 0:12		First overtime period		No scoring
Johan Gustafsson 18 saves / 20 shots		Goalie stats		Alexander Salák 36 saves / 39 shots

April 6	Färjestad BK	1–2	**OT**	**Luleå HF**	Löfbergs Lila Arena	Recap
No scoring		First period		No scoring
Magnus Nygren 1 - pp - 8:12		Second period		No scoring
No scoring		Third period		11:16 - pp - Linus Persson 6
No scoring		First overtime period		12:45 - Linus Klasen 4
Alexander Salák 30 saves / 32 shots		Goalie stats		Johan Gustafsson 44 saves / 45 shots

**Luleå HF won series 4–1**

=== Finals: (1) Skellefteå AIK vs. (3) Luleå HF ===
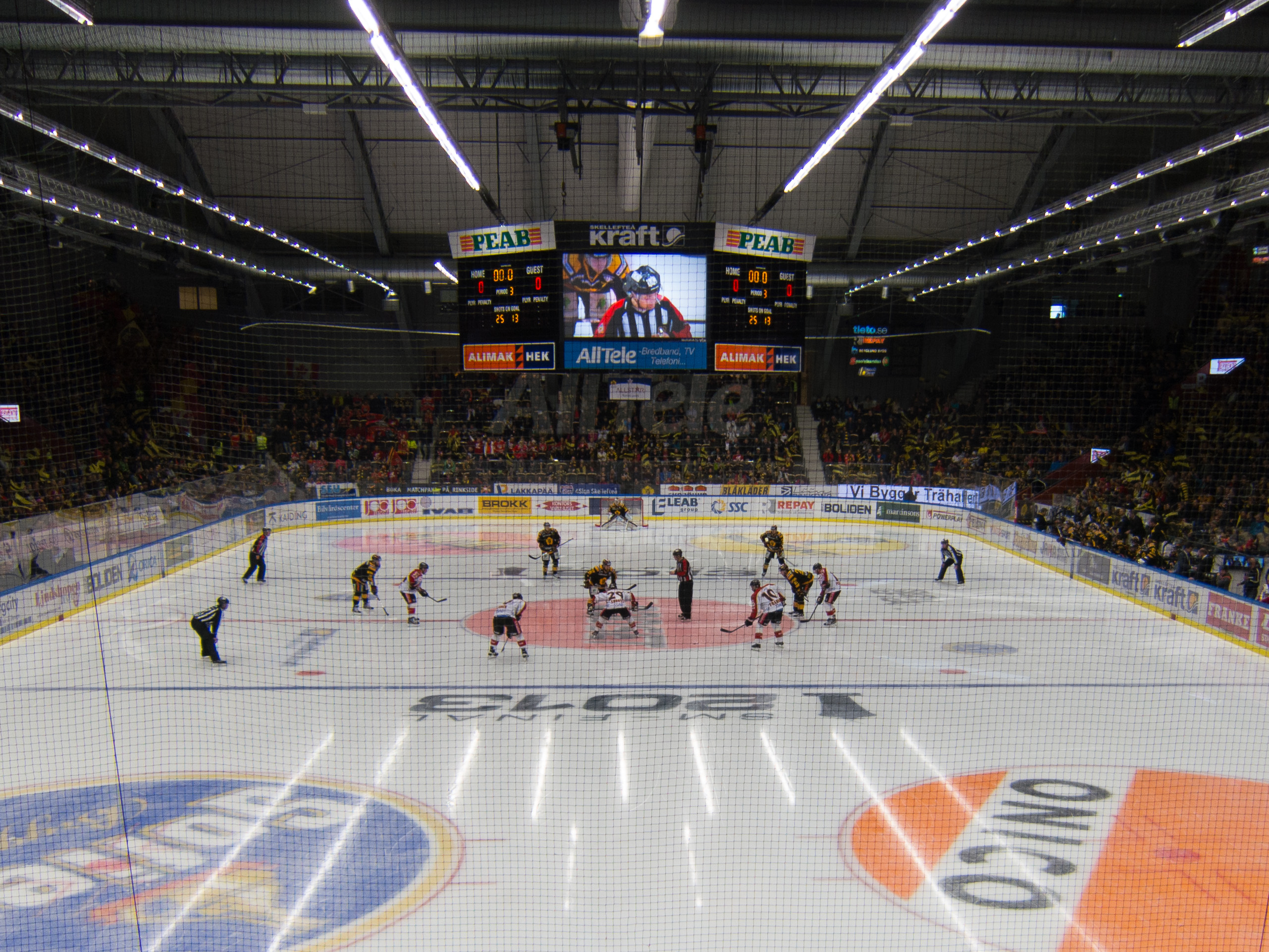
Skellefteå AIK - Luleå HF Finals 2013, Game 1

The Finals became a matchup between the league's two northernmost teams: Skellefteå and Luleå. Skellefteå won three of the five regular-season games against Luleå; two of the five games had to be decided in a shootout. This was only the second playoff series between these two teams; in 2011, Skellefteå defeated Luleå in six games to advance to the Finals (where they eventually lost). This was Skellefteå's third consecutive Finals appearance (Skellefteå reached the Finals in 2011 and 2012), and their fourth overall excluding seasons before Elitserien was formed. Luleå made their first Finals appearance since losing the Swedish Championship to Färjestad three games to one in 1997, as well as their third appearance overall (Luleå became Swedish Champions in 1996).

Skellefteå won the series 4–0, and became Swedish champions for the first time since 1978, and only the second time in club history. Luleå became the first team since 2003 to get swept in the Finals, in four straight games. Skellefteå finished the playoffs with a 12–1 record, the best playoff record since Färjestad's playoff run in 2009.

In Game 4, Skellefteå clinched the Swedish Championship with a 4–0 shutout over Luleå. Goaltender Joacim Eriksson stopped all 32 shots against Skellefteå's crease. After the first period, Skellefteå was up 2–0, following goals by Oscar Möller at 3:33 and Erik Forssell at 15:22. 5:32 into the second period, Johan Forsberg netted his first goal of the playoffs to give Skellefteå a three-goal lead. With less than four minutes to go in the third period, Erik Forssell sealed the Swedish Championship for Skellefteå with an empty netter, his second goal of the game.

April 13	**Skellefteå AIK**	1–0	**OT**	Luleå HF	Skellefteå Kraft Arena	Recap
No scoring		First period		No scoring
No scoring		Second period		No scoring
No scoring		Third period		No scoring
Bud Holloway 4 - 8:30		First overtime period		No scoring
Joacim Eriksson 18 saves / 18 shots		Goalie stats		Johan Gustafsson 44 saves / 45 shots

April 14	Luleå HF	**2–4**	**Skellefteå AIK**	Coop Norrbotten Arena	Recap
Linus Persson 7 - 2:35		**First period**	11:37 - Petter Emanuelsson 6; 15:01 - Viktor Arvidsson 5; 16:55 - Jimmie Ericsson 3
Linus Persson 8 - 12:24		**Second period**	6:01 - Melker Karlsson 2
No scoring		**Third period**	No scoring
Johan Gustafsson 18 saves / 22 shots		**Goalie stats**	Joacim Eriksson 32 saves / 34 shots

April 16	**Skellefteå AIK**	**2–1**	Luleå HF	Skellefteå Kraft Arena	Recap
No scoring		**First period**	18:50 - pp - Daniel Gunnarsson 3
Martin Ševc 2 - 0:32; Viktor Arvidsson 6 - 18:00		**Second period**	No scoring
No scoring		**Third period**	No scoring
Joacim Eriksson 28 saves / 29 shots		**Goalie stats**	Johan Gustafsson 23 saves / 25 shots

April 18	Luleå HF	**0–4**	**Skellefteå AIK**	Coop Norrbotten Arena	Recap
No scoring		**First period**	3:33 - Oscar Möller 5; 15:22 - Erik Forssell 4
No scoring		**Second period**	5:32 - Johan Forsberg 1
No scoring		**Third period**	16:22 - en - Erik Forssell 5
Johan Gustafsson 37 saves / 40 shots		**Goalie stats**	Joacim Eriksson 32 saves / 32 shots

**Skellefteå AIK won series 4–0**

=== Statistics ===
==== Scoring leaders ====
Updated as of the end of the playoffs.
GP = Games played; G = Goals; A = Assists; Pts = Points; +/– = Plus/minus; PIM = Penalty minutes

Player	Team	GP	G	A	Pts	+/–	PIM
(Sweden) Linus Persson	Luleå HF	15	8	4	12	+4	6
(Sweden) Pär Arlbrandt	Linköpings HC	10	7	5	12	+6	4
(Canada) Chris Lee	Färjestad BK	10	7	5	12	+5	6
(Sweden) Oscar Lindberg	Skellefteå AIK	13	4	8	12	+13	16
(Sweden) Linus Klasen	Luleå HF	14	4	8	12	–4	4
(Sweden) Simon Hjalmarsson	Linköpings HC	10	5	6	11	+5	8
(Sweden) Joakim Lindström	Skellefteå AIK	13	4	7	11	+3	4
(Sweden) Niklas Olausson	Luleå HF	15	1	10	11	+2	4
(Sweden) Erik Forssell	Skellefteå AIK	13	5	5	10	+6	2
(Sweden) Oscar Möller	Skellefteå AIK	13	5	5	10	+4	2

==== Leading goaltenders ====
These are the leaders in GAA and save percentage among goaltenders who played at least 40% of the team's minutes. The table is sorted by GAA, and the criteria for inclusion are bolded. Updated as of the end of the playoffs.

GP = Games played; TOI = Time on ice (minutes); GA = Goals against; SO = Shutouts; Sv% = Save percentage; GAA = Goals against average

Player	Team	GP	TOI	GA	SO	Sv%	GAA
(Sweden) Joacim Eriksson	Skellefteå AIK	10	623:01	11	3	**.952**	**1.06**
(Sweden) Linus Ullmark	Modo Hockey	2	122:49	3	0	**.955**	**1.47**
(Sweden) Johan Gustafsson	Luleå HF	15	946:10	32	0	**.925**	**2.03**
(Slovakia) Július Hudáček	Frölunda HC	6	388:29	15	1	**.920**	**2.32**
(Czech Republic) Alexander Salák	Färjestad BK	10	616:06	24	1	**.922**	**2.34**

== Elitserien awards ==
Guldhjälmen: Bud Holloway, Skellefteå AIK
Guldpucken: Jimmie Ericsson, Skellefteå AIK
Honken Trophy: Gustaf Wesslau, HV71
Håkan Loob Trophy: Carl Söderberg, Linköpings HC
Rookie of the Year: William Karlsson, HV71
Salming Trophy: Magnus Nygren, Färjestad BK
Stefan Liv Memorial Trophy: Oscar Lindberg, Skellefteå AIK
Guldpipan: Ulf Rönnmark

== See also ==
- 2013 Kvalserien
- List of SHL seasons
- 2012 in ice hockey
- 2013 in ice hockey
