= Perttu Lindgren =

Finnish ice hockey player (born 1987)

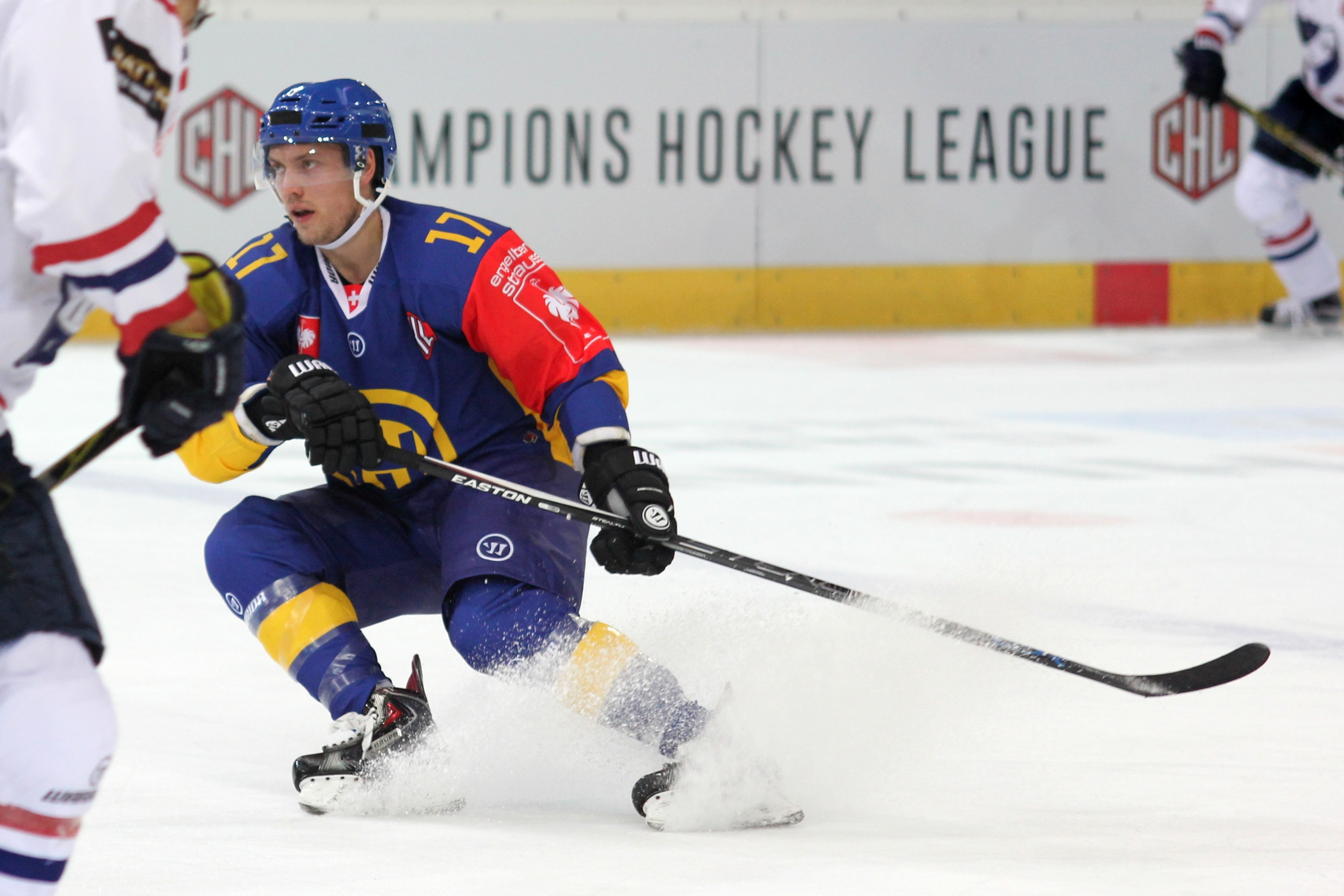
- Born: August 26, 1987 (age 38) Tampere, Finland
- Height: 6 ft 0 in (183 cm)
- Weight: 187 lb (85 kg; 13 st 5 lb)
- Position: Centre
- Shot: Left
- Played for: Ilves Tampere; Lukko; Dallas Stars; Atlant Moscow Oblast; Amur Khabarovsk; HC Davos; EHC Biel
- NHL draft: 75th overall, 2005; Dallas Stars
- Playing career: 2005–2021

Medal record

Ice hockey

Representing Finland

World Junior Hockey Championships
Bronze medal – third place	2006 Canada	

Perttu Lindgren (born August 26, 1987) is a Finnish former professional ice hockey centre who briefly played in the National Hockey League (NHL) with the Dallas Stars.

== Playing career ==
Lindgren played with Ilves Tampere in the Finnish SM-liiga when he was drafted 75th overall in the 2005 NHL entry draft by the Dallas Stars. Lindgren signed an entry-level contract with the Stars and in the 2009–10 season, made his NHL debut, playing in a single game for the Stars.

On April 10, 2010, as a restricted free agent, Lindgren opted to return to the SM-liiga, signing with Lukko Rauma. On May 19, 2012, Lindgren signed a contract with Kontinental Hockey League club Atlant Mytishchi. In his debut season in 2012–13 in November, Atlant decided to put Lindgren on the waivers list, from which he was claimed by Amur Khabarovsk.

On March 18, 2013, Lindgren signed an initial one-year contract with Swiss club, HC Davos of the NLA, before, during his first season in 2013–14, signing a three-year extension to remain in Davos on November 27, 2013.

On April 22, 2016, Lindgren was signed to a two-year contract extension by HC Davos.

On April 10, 2017, Lindgren agreed to an early two-year contract extension with HC Davos.

On January 6, 2021, HC Davos announced its intention to release Lindgren following bad performances with the team. Lindgren spent 8 seasons with HC Davos, appearing in 300 regular season games (247 points) and an additional 44 postseason contests (36 points). During his tenure in Davos, Lindgren won an NL title in 2015 and was crowned NL MVP for the 2015-16 season. He was also limited to 5 games during the 2017-18 season with a lingering hip injury. On January 11, 2021, Lindgren was eventually traded, along with Luca Hischier, to EHC Biel in exchange for David Ullström and Valentin Nüssbaumer.

== Awards ==
- Won the Finnish Champion (Kanada-malja) in 2004–05.
- Won the Finnish SM-Liiga (Bronze) in 2010–11.
- Awarded the Veli-Pekka Ketola award in 2011.
- Won the Swiss National League Champion in 2015-16.

== International play ==
Lindgren played for Finland at the 2007 World Junior Ice Hockey Championships.

== Career statistics ==
=== Regular season and playoffs ===
			Regular season					Playoffs
Season	Team	League	GP	G	A	Pts	PIM	GP	G	A	Pts	PIM
2003–04	Ilves	FIN U18	24	11	17	28	26	—	—	—	—	—
2003–04	Ilves	FIN U20	2	0	0	0	0	—	—	—	—	—
2004–05	Ilves	FIN U20	38	12	29	41	2	10	7	10	17	4
2004–05	Ilves	SM-l	2	0	0	0	0	—	—	—	—	—
2005–06	Ilves	FIN U20	2	1	0	1	0	—	—	—	—	—
2005–06	Ilves	SM-l	51	13	24	37	16	4	0	0	0	0
2006–07	Ilves	SM-l	43	4	22	26	38	7	4	2	6	2
2007–08	Iowa Stars	AHL	69	10	24	34	6	—	—	—	—	—
2008–09	Lukko	SM-l	49	5	19	24	16	—	—	—	—	—
2009–10	Dallas Stars	NHL	1	0	0	0	0	—	—	—	—	—
2009–10	Texas Stars	AHL	74	14	33	47	14	24	7	10	17	2
2010–11	Lukko	SM-l	56	23	43	66	30	12	4	5	9	2
2011–12	Lukko	SM-l	48	13	26	39	16	3	0	1	1	0
2012–13	Atlant Moscow Oblast	KHL	19	3	2	5	6	—	—	—	—	—
2012–13	Amur Khabarovsk	KHL	21	5	6	11	10	—	—	—	—	—
2013–14	HC Davos	NLA	48	13	13	26	16	6	0	2	2	4
2014–15	HC Davos	NLA	42	11	23	34	4	15	5	7	12	4
2015–16	HC Davos	NLA	50	22	40	62	20	9	7	3	10	8
2016–17	HC Davos	NLA	46	15	25	40	70	10	5	3	8	2
2017–18	HC Davos	NL	5	0	4	4	2	—	—	—	—	—
2018–19	HC Davos	NL	41	14	16	30	16	—	—	—	—	—
2019–20	HC Davos	NL	48	12	28	40	26	—	—	—	—	—
2020–21	HC Davos	NL	20	4	7	11	8	—	—	—	—	—
2020–21	EHC Biel	NL	4	1	1	2	4	—	—	—	—	—
SM-l totals			249	58	134	192	116	26	8	8	16	4
NL totals			304	92	157	249	166	40	17	15	32	18

=== International ===
Year	Team	Event	Result	GP	G	A	Pts	PIM
2004	Finland	U17	6th	5	2	4	6	2
2005	Finland	WJC18	7th	6	2	0	2	2
2006	Finland	WJC	3rd place, bronze medalist(s)	7	2	4	6	2
2007	Finland	WJC	6th	6	2	8	10	8
Junior totals				24	8	16	24	14
