= Valentin Nüssbaumer =

Swiss ice hockey player

- Born: September 25, 2000 (age 25) Delémont, Switzerland
- Height: 5 ft 11 in (180 cm)
- Weight: 175 lb (79 kg; 12 st 7 lb)
- Position: Left wing
- Shoots: Left
- NL team Former teams: HC Davos; EHC Biel
- NHL draft: 207th overall, 2019; Arizona Coyotes
- Playing career: 2017–present

Valentin Nüssbaumer (born 25 September 2000) is a Swiss professional ice hockey left winger who is currently playing with HC Davos of the National League (NL). Nüssbaumer was drafted 207th overall by the Arizona Coyotes in the 2019 NHL entry draft.

== Playing career ==
Nüssbaumer made his professional debut with EHC Biel in the 2017–18 season, appearing in 26 National League games this season. He spent the rest of the season with Biel's junior team in the Elite Junior A, where he played 20 games and put up 18 points (7 goals) and added 6 points (3 goals) in 8 games in the playoffs. Nüssbaumer spent the 2018–19 season with the Shawinigan Cataractes in the QMJHL. He played an additional 31 games with the team during the 2019–20 season before returning to EHC Biel for the end of the season.

On January 11, 2021, Nüssbaumer was traded, along with David Ullström, to HC Davos in exchange for Luca Hischier and Perttu Lindgren.

== International play ==
Nüssbaumer was named to Switzerland's national junior team for the 2018, 2019 and 2020 World Junior Championship.
