= Johan Gustafsson =

Swedish ice hockey player

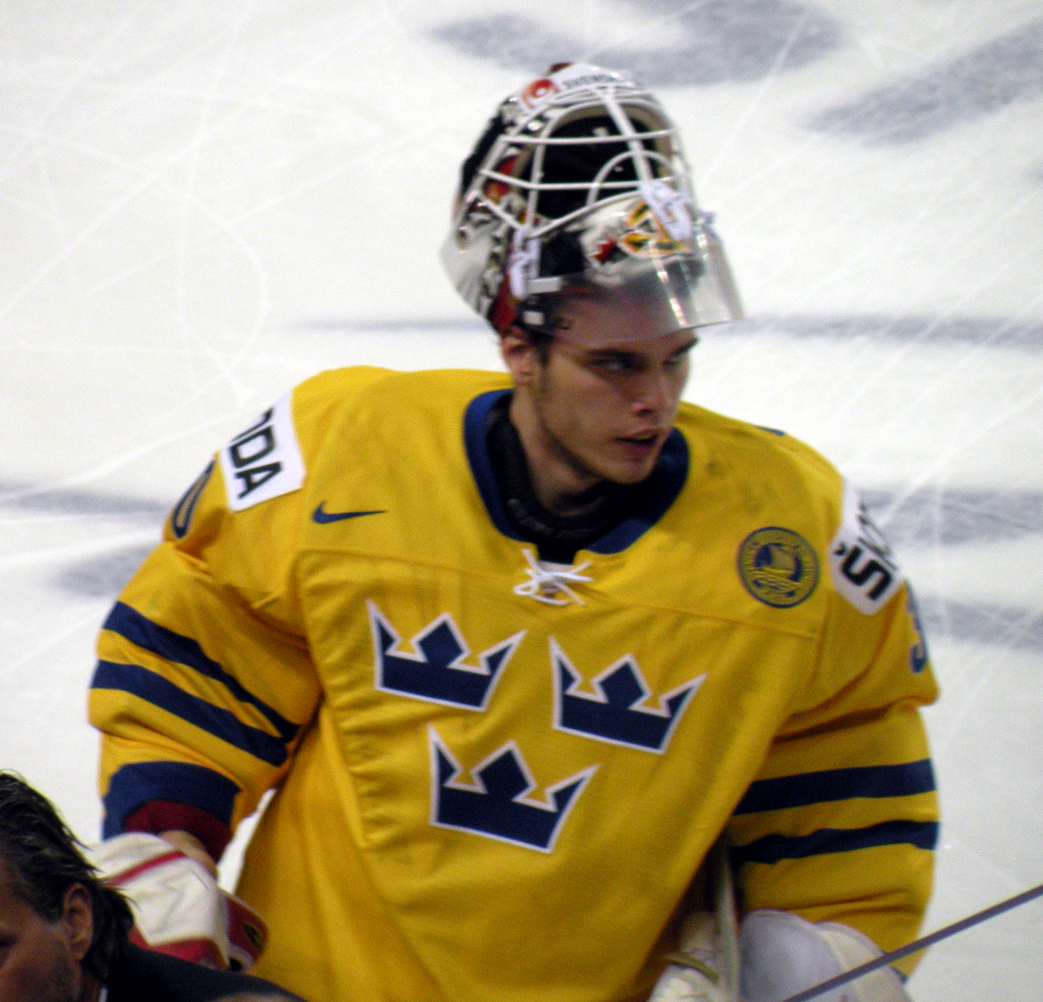
- Born: February 28, 1992 (age 34) Köping, Sweden
- Height: 6 ft 2 in (188 cm)
- Weight: 196 lb (89 kg; 14 st 0 lb)
- Position: Goaltender
- Caught: Left
- Played for: IFK Arboga IK; Färjestad BK; Västerås IK; Luleå HF; Minnesota Wild; Frölunda HC; Adler Mannheim; Rögle BK; Lahti Pelicans
- National team: Sweden
- NHL draft: 159th overall, 2010; Minnesota Wild
- Playing career: 2009–2024

Johan Gustafsson (born 28 February 1992) is a Swedish ice hockey coach and former professional ice hockey goaltender who is currently an assistant coach for Västerås IK of HockeyAllsvenskan.

== Playing career ==
Johan played for Västerås HK in the 2010–11 season, with Luleå HF for the next two seasons and has also played 3 SHL games with Färjestad BK. He was drafted 159th overall by the Minnesota Wild in the 2010 NHL entry draft.

After an SHL rookie season where Gustafsson had five shutouts in his first 20 games with Luleå, he was nominated for the 2011–12 SHL Rookie of the Year award.

Approaching the deadline to retain Gustafsson's rights, the Wild signed Gustafsson to a three-year, entry-level contract in May 2012. He was returned on loan to Luleå for the first year of his contract. In his first North American season, Gustafsson was assigned to American Hockey League affiliate, the Iowa Wild.

Over the duration of his tenure with the Wild, Gustafsson was recalled to the NHL; however, he never appeared in a game.

On May 4, 2015, as an impending restricted free agent, Gustafsson opted to return to his native Sweden and played for Frölunda HC of the SHL.

After claiming his second Le Mat Trophy in his four year tenure with Frölunda HC, Gustafsson left the club at the conclusion of his contract upon the end of the 2018–19 Championship-winning season.

As a free agent, Gustafsson left Sweden, signing a one-year deal with newly crowned DEL champions, Adler Mannheim, on May 7, 2019.

In 2020-21, he signed with Rögle BK of the SHL, splitting starts with Christoffer Rifalk as they won a SHL Silver Medal.

For the next two seasons, Gustafsson started for Västerås IK of HockeyAllsvenskan.

In December 2023, Gustafsson was signed to Pelicans of Liiga to serve as the backup for Jasper Patrikainen after the transfer of Jussi Olkinuora before the arrival of Nikke Kokko bumped him to 3rd string goaltender.

== International play ==
Medal record

Representing Sweden

Ice hockey

World Championships
Gold medal – first place	2013 Sweden/Finland	

World Junior Championships
Gold medal – first place	2012 Calgary	

IIHF World U18 Championship
Silver medal – second place	2010 Minsk	

Gustafsson was Sweden's starting goalie in the 2010 IIHF World U18 Championships where the team won the silver medal. Gustafsson was part of the Gold medal winning Swedish 2013 World Championship team; however, he was unable to feature in any game.

== Career statistics ==
=== Regular season and playoffs ===
			Regular season									Playoffs
Season	Team	League	GP	W	L	T/OT	MIN	GA	SO	GAA	SV%	GP	W	L	MIN	GA	SO	GAA	SV%
2009–10	Färjestad BK	SEL	3	—	—	—	136	9	0	3.96	.868	—	—	—	—	—	—	—	—
2009–10	Skåre BK	Div.1	26	—	—	—	—	—	—	2.86	.894	—	—	—	—	—	—	—	—
2010–11	Västerås HK	Allsv	26	—	—	—	1510	58	2	2.30	.911	—	—	—	—	—	—	—	—
2011–12	Luleå HF	SEL	29	18	9	0	1754	51	6	1.74	.929	3	1	2	179	10	0	3.36	.884
2012–13	Luleå HF	SEL	33	20	13	0	2016	57	4	1.70	.932	15	8	7	946	32	0	2.03	.925
2013–14	Iowa Wild	AHL	40	12	20	4	2253	112	1	2.98	.903	—	—	—	—	—	—	—	—
2014–15	Iowa Wild	AHL	35	8	22	1	1842	107	0	3.48	.893	—	—	—	—	—	—	—	—
2014–15	Alaska Aces	ECHL	5	4	1	0	304	15	0	2.96	.899	—	—	—	—	—	—	—	—
2015–16	Frölunda HC	SHL	22	10	9	0	1157	51	1	2.65	.883	9	6	2	506	19	0	2.25	.920
2016–17	Frölunda HC	SHL	38	22	13	0	2074	73	2	2.11	.917	14	7	7	804	34	2	2.54	.904
2017–18	Frölunda HC	SHL	32	20	9	0	1845	84	3	2.73	.891	6	2	4	353	15	0	2.55	.888
2018–19	Frölunda HC	SHL	27	14	12	0	1530	69	2	2.71	.897	5	3	1	226	8	0	2.12	.916
2019–20	Adler Mannheim	DEL	21	13	4	0	1159	51	3	2.64	.887	—	—	—	—	—	—	—	—
2020–21	Rögle BK	SHL	20	13	7	0	1196	49	2	2.46	.901	1	0	1	59	4	0	4.03	.833
2021–22	Västerås IK	Allsv	35	22	13	0	2063	73	7	2.12	.920	2	0	2	146	5	0	2.05	.933
AHL totals			75	20	42	5	4095	219	1	3.23	.899	—	—	—	—	—	—	—	—

=== International ===
Year	Team	Event	Result	GP	W	L	T	MIN	GA	SO	GAA	SV%
2009	Sweden	WJC18	5th	2	2	0	0	120	2	1	1.00	.964
2010	Sweden	WJC18	2nd place, silver medalist(s)	4	3	1	0	238	8	0	2.02	.918
2012	Sweden	WJC	1st place, gold medalist(s)	5	5	0	0	327	12	1	2.20	.888
Junior totals				11	10	1	0	685	22	2	1.92	.916

== Awards and honors ==
Award	Year
SHL
Rookie of the Year nominee	2012
Le Mat Trophy (Frölunda HC)	2016, 2019
CHL
Champions (Frölunda HC)	2016, 2017, 2019
