= Daniel Gunnarsson =

Swedish ice hockey player

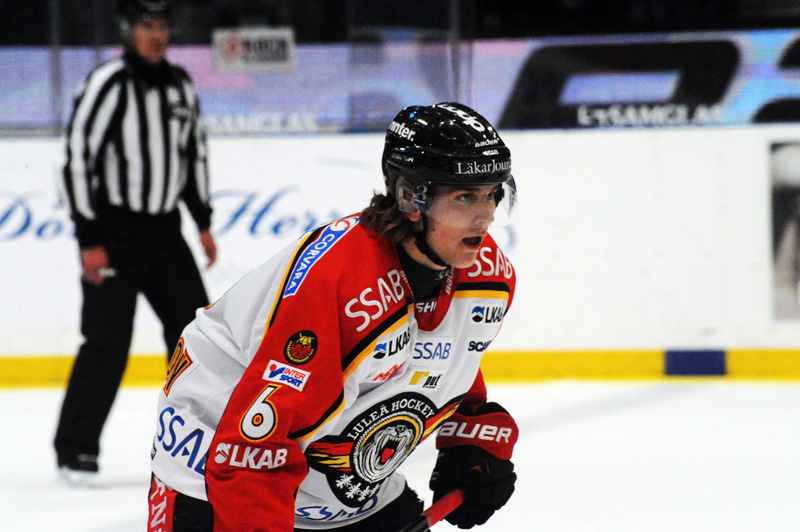
- Born: April 15, 1992 (age 34) Köping, Sweden
- Height: 6 ft 6 in (198 cm)
- Weight: 205 lb (93 kg; 14 st 9 lb)
- Position: Defense
- Shoots: Right
- Allsv team Former teams: Västerås IK; Leksands IF; Luleå HF; Färjestad BK; Karlskrona HK
- NHL draft: 128th overall, 2012; Minnesota Wild
- Playing career: 2010–present

Daniel Gunnarsson (born April 15, 1992) is a Swedish professional ice hockey player. He currently plays for Västerås IK in the HockeyAllsvenskan (Allsv). He was selected in the fifth round, 128th overall, by the Minnesota Wild in the 2012 NHL entry draft.

== Playing career ==
Gunnarsson originally played as a youth and made his professional debut with Leksands IF in the HockeyAllsvenskan during the 2009–10 season.

After two seasons in the Allsvenskan, Gunnarsson left to sign a top tier contract with Luleå HF on 20 April 2011. He made his debut in the Elitserien with Luleå HF during the 2011–12 season.

== Career statistics ==
			Regular season					Playoffs
Season	Team	League	GP	G	A	Pts	PIM	GP	G	A	Pts	PIM
2006–07	Köping HC	Div.2	3	0	0	0	0	—	—	—	—	—
2008–09	Leksands IF	J20	33	1	5	6	26	3	0	1	1	0
2009–10	Leksands IF	J20	14	2	3	5	6	—	—	—	—	—
2009–10	Leksands IF	Allsv	1	0	0	0	0	—	—	—	—	—
2010–11	Leksands IF	J20	38	3	13	16	51	—	—	—	—	—
2010–11	Leksands IF	Allsv	5	0	0	0	0	—	—	—	—	—
2010–11	Falu IF	Div.1	5	0	3	3	4	—	—	—	—	—
2011–12	Luleå HF	J20	6	2	1	3	8	—	—	—	—	—
2011–12	Luleå HF	SEL	46	3	4	7	8	5	0	0	0	0
2012–13	Luleå HF	SEL	53	6	11	17	20	15	3	2	5	2
2013–14	Luleå HF	SHL	50	3	11	14	12	5	1	2	3	0
2014–15	Färjestad BK	SHL	53	1	8	9	26	3	0	0	0	0
2015–16	Färjestad BK	SHL	40	1	5	6	12	—	—	—	—	—
2015–16	Karlskrona HK	SHL	10	0	2	2	2	—	—	—	—	—
2016–17	Karlskrona HK	SHL	52	3	13	16	26	—	—	—	—	—
2017–18	Karlskrona HK	SHL	51	3	6	9	16	—	—	—	—	—
2018–19	Leksands IF	Allsv	52	10	17	27	22	12	4	5	9	6
2019–20	Leksands IF	SHL	42	8	8	16	33	—	—	—	—	—
2020–21	Leksands IF	SHL	46	7	6	13	14	4	0	0	0	0
2021–22	Västerås IK	Allsv	47	2	24	26	12	5	0	1	1	6
SHL totals			443	35	74	109	169	32	4	4	8	2
