= Luca Hischier =

Swiss professional ice hockey player (born 1995)

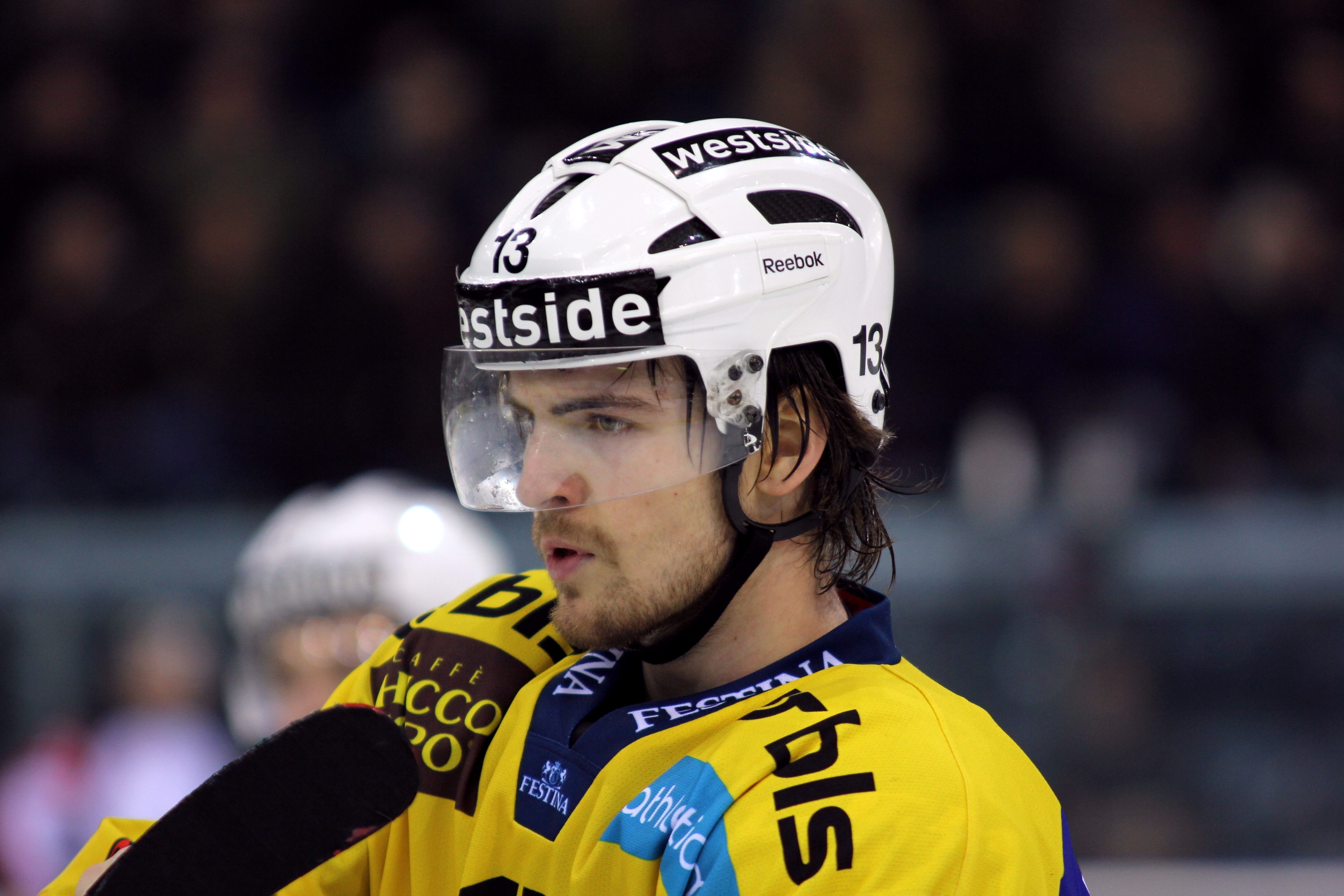
- Hischier in 2016
- Born: 16 February 1995 (age 31) Naters, Switzerland
- Height: 6 ft 1 in (185 cm)
- Weight: 196 lb (89 kg; 14 st 0 lb)
- Position: Centre
- Shoots: Left
- NL team Former teams: Genève-Servette; SC Bern; HC Davos; EHC Biel
- Playing career: 2013–present

Luca Hischier (born 16 February 1995) is a Swiss professional ice hockey forward who is currently playing with Genève-Servette of the National League (NL). He previously played with SC Bern where he won two NL titles. Hischier also played with HC Davos and EHC Biel.

He is the older brother of New Jersey Devils captain, Nico Hischier.

== Playing career ==
Hischier, who played in both the junior system of SC Bern and his hometown EHC Visp, made his NL debut with Bern in 2013 while still being a member of SC Bern U20 team. He signed his first professional contract on 1 May 2014 with SC Bern and went on to play the 2014/15 season for EHC Visp of the Swiss League (SL) on loan from SC Bern. On 21 December 2015, while in the middle of his first full season with SC Bern, Hischier was signed to a two-year contract extension to remain in Bern through the 2017–18 season.

On 24 November 2017, Hischier agreed to a three-year contract with HC Davos starting with the 2018/19 season and through the 2020/21 season.

On 11 January 2021, Hischier was traded, along with Perttu Lindgren, to EHC Biel in exchange for David Ullström and Valentin Nüssbaumer.

== International play ==
Hischier has represented Switzerland at the 2015 World Junior Championships.

== Personal life ==
Hischier comes from a family of athletes, as his father Rino played football for FC Naters and his mother Katja worked as a sports teacher. He is the oldest of three children, with a younger sister, Nina, and brother, Nico. Nico played for the Halifax Mooseheads in the Quebec Major Junior Hockey League (QMJHL) and was selected 1st overall by the New Jersey Devils during the 2017 NHL Draft. Nina also played volleyball at a high level in Switzerland. There were no rinks in Naters, so Katja took both her sons to nearby Visp to learn to skate and they discovered hockey there.
