= Petter Emanuelsson =

Swedish ice hockey player (born 1991)

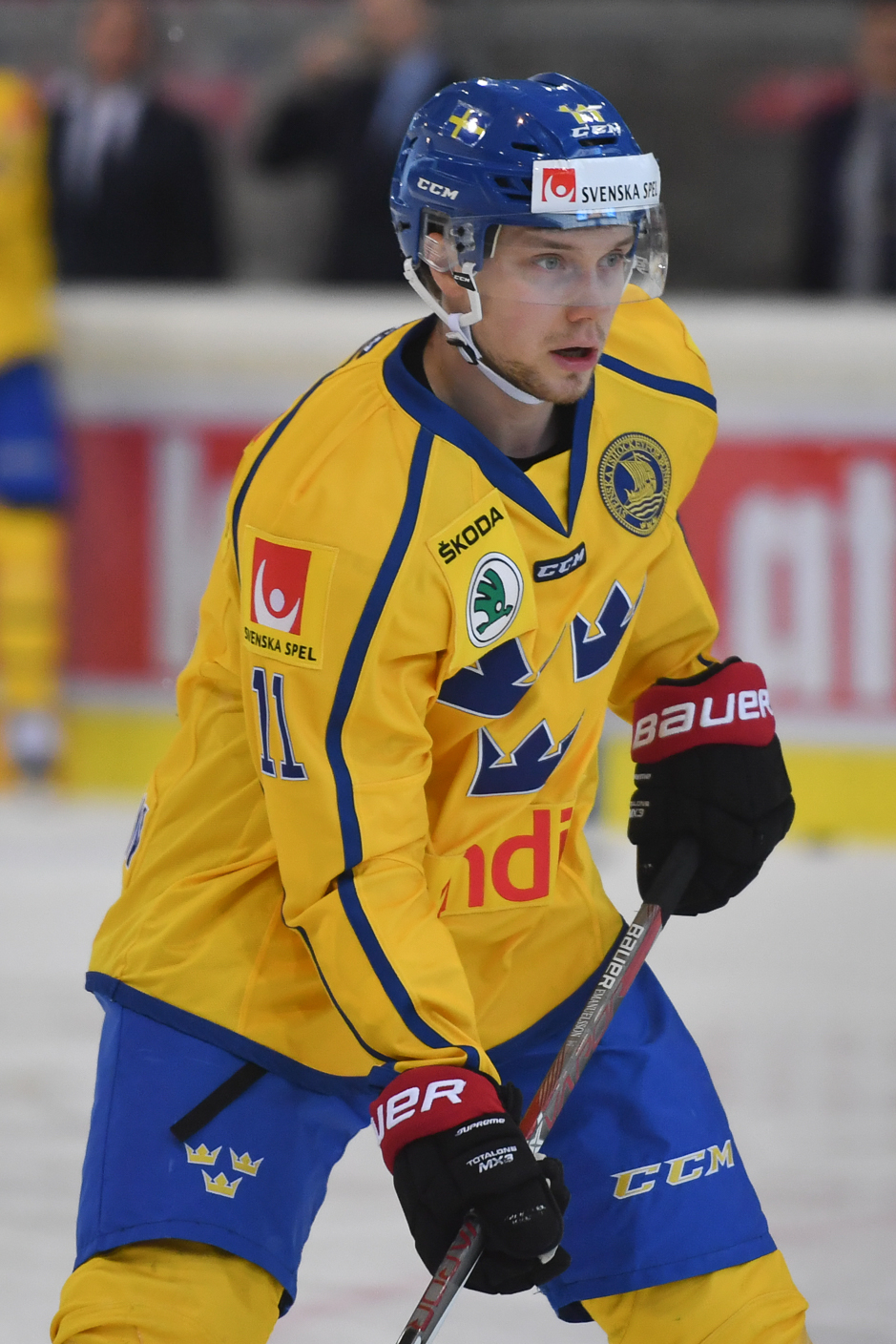
- Born: August 7, 1991 (age 35) Kiruna, Sweden
- Height: 6 ft 0 in (183 cm)
- Weight: 207 lb (94 kg; 14 st 11 lb)
- Position: Forward
- Shoots: Left
- team Former teams: Free agent Skellefteå AIK; Luleå HF; Oulun Kärpät; KooKoo
- NHL draft: Undrafted
- Playing career: 2010–present

Petter Emanuelsson (born August 7, 1991) is a Swedish professional ice hockey forward. He is currently an unrestricted free agent who was most recently under contract with KooKoo of the Finnish Liiga.

== Playing career ==
Emanuelsson played with Skellefteå AIK in the Swedish Hockey League, making his debut during the 2009–10 Elitserien season. Emanuelsson's first SHL goal came on January 18, 2012, against Martin Gerber of the Växjö Lakers.

On June 11, 2013, Emanuelsson signed a two-year contract with the San Jose Sharks. In his first North American season in 2014–15, Emanuelsson scored 4 goals in 6 games with the Sharks AHL affiliate, the Worcester Sharks before suffering a season-ending injury.

On June 27, 2015, Emanuelsson was re-signed to a further one-year contract with the Sharks and spent the 2015–16 season with their newly founded AHL affiliate San Jose Barracuda, making 58 appearances with eleven goals and twelve assists.

He returned to his native Sweden for the 2016–17 season, signing with Luleå HF of the Swedish Hockey League (SHL) on May 18, 2016.

== Career statistics ==
			Regular season					Playoffs
Season	Team	League	GP	G	A	Pts	PIM	GP	G	A	Pts	PIM
2009–10	Skellefteå AIK	J20	22	5	9	14	2	—	—	—	—	—
2009–10	Skellefteå AIK	SEL	1	0	1	1	0	—	—	—	—	—
2010–11	Skellefteå	J20	40	21	28	49	14	5	3	3	6	0
2010–11	Skellefteå AIK	SEL	4	0	0	0	0	—	—	—	—	—
2011–12	Skellefteå	J20	6	2	3	5	0	—	—	—	—	—
2011–12	Skellefteå AIK	SEL	17	1	0	1	4	6	0	0	0	0
2011–12	Piteå HC	Div.1	27	16	9	25	10	—	—	—	—	—
2012–13	Skellefteå AIK	SEL	54	9	9	18	8	13	6	2	8	0
2013–14	Skellefteå AIK	SHL	44	6	9	15	2	9	2	1	3	0
2014–15	Worcester Sharks	AHL	6	4	0	4	0	—	—	—	—	—
2015–16	San Jose Barracuda	AHL	58	11	12	23	8	—	—	—	—	—
2016–17	Luleå HF	SHL	41	15	5	20	8	2	2	0	2	2
2017–18	Luleå HF	SHL	43	3	10	13	0	2	0	0	0	0
2018–19	Luleå HF	SHL	52	14	13	27	16	10	3	0	3	0
2019–20	Luleå HF	SHL	42	14	7	21	6	—	—	—	—	—
2020–21	Luleå HF	SHL	24	7	4	11	0	—	—	—	—	—
2021–22	Oulun Kärpät	Liiga	52	19	15	34	10	7	0	2	2	2
2022–23	Oulun Kärpät	Liiga	32	6	6	12	4	1	0	0	0	0
2023–24	KooKoo	Liiga	42	13	12	25	6	—	—	—	—	—
2024–25	KooKoo	Liiga	40	7	5	12	4	4	0	0	0	2
SHL totals			322	69	58	127	44	42	13	3	16	2
Liiga totals			166	45	38	83	24	12	0	2	2	4
