= Pär Arlbrandt =

Swedish ice hockey forward (born 1982)

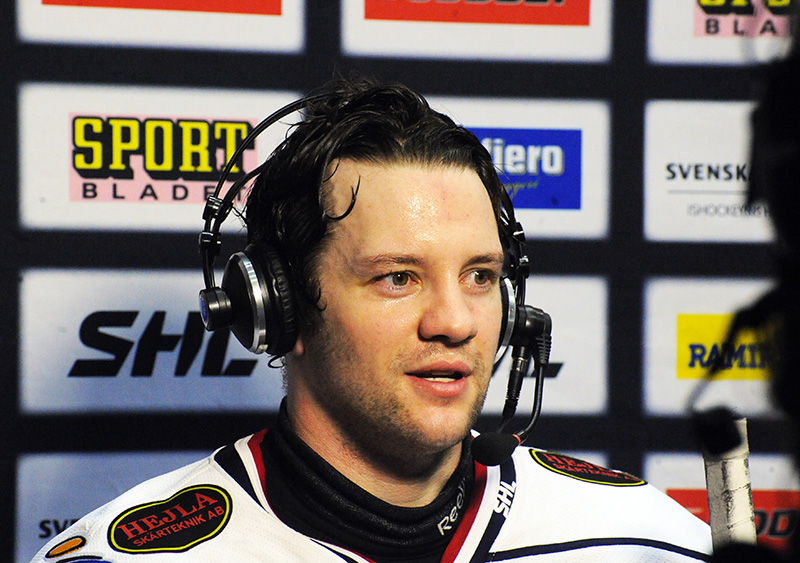
- Born: November 22, 1982 (age 42); Jönköping, Sweden
- Height: 5 ft 7 in (170 cm)
- Weight: 176 lb (80 kg; 12 st 8 lb)
- Position: Right wing
- Shot: Right
- Played for: HV71; Södertälje SK; EC KAC; Luleå HF; Linköpings HC; EHC Biel
- Playing career: 2000–2017

Pär Arlbrandt (born November 22, 1982) is a Swedish former professional ice hockey forward, who last played for HV71 in the Swedish Hockey League (SHL).

== Playing career ==
Arlbrandt joined Swiss club EHC Biel on a one-year contract on July 23, 2014, after leading the Swedish Hockey League in scoring in the 2013–14 season with 71 points in 53 games for Linköpings HC. He then returned to HV71 in 2016. After winning the SHL title with HV71 in 2017, Arlbrandt announced his retirement as a player.

== Career statistics ==
			Regular season					Playoffs
Season	Team	League	GP	G	A	Pts	PIM	GP	G	A	Pts	PIM
1999–00	HV71	J20	31	9	10	19	14	2	0	1	1	2
2000–01	HV71	J20	18	16	11	27	35	3	1	1	2	4
2000–01	HV71	SEL	14	0	0	0	0	—	—	—	—	—
2001–02	IF Troja/Ljungby	Allsv	46	24	18	42	49	—	—	—	—	—
2002–03	HV71	J20	5	6	2	8	0	—	—	—	—	—
2002–03	HV71	SEL	38	0	2	2	4	—	—	—	—	—
2002–03	Rögle BK	Allsv	9	2	7	9	12	10	2	2	4	4
2003–04	Rögle BK	Allsv	46	14	25	39	42	—	—	—	—	—
2004–05	Rögle BK	Allsv	38	11	24	35	12	—	—	—	—	—
2005–06	Rögle BK	Allsv	36	10	16	26	18	10	1	6	7	12
2006–07	Rögle BK	Allsv	45	25	47	72	14	9	2	6	8	2
2007–08	Södertälje SK	SEL	26	1	1	2	6	—	—	—	—	—
2007–08	EC KAC	EBEL	9	4	3	7	18	3	1	0	1	4
2008–09	VIK Västerås HK	Allsv	42	28	49	77	52	10	3	10	3	8
2009–10	Luleå HF	SEL	52	16	21	37	20	—	—	—	—	—
2010–11	Luleå HF	SEL	55	19	21	40	16	13	3	2	5	14
2011–12	Linköpings HC	SEL	55	14	23	37	24	—	—	—	—	—
2012–13	Linköpings HC	SEL	54	21	32	53	28	10	7	5	12	4
2013–14	Linköpings HC	SHL	53	26	45	71	66	14	3	7	10	2
2014–15	EHC Biel	NLA	48	17	22	39	12	7	5	3	8	6
2015–16	EHC Biel	NLA	36	12	13	25	10	—	—	—	—	—
2015–16	HV71	SHL	15	3	8	11	8	6	0	4	4	4
2016–17	HV71	SEL	47	11	18	29	4	16	1	8	9	2
SHL totals			409	111	171	282	176	59	14	26	40	26

== Awards and honors ==
Award	Year
SHL
Le Mat Trophy (HV71)	2017
