= Jan Sandström (ice hockey) =

Swedish ice hockey player (born 1978)

- Born: January 24, 1978 (age 47); Luleå, SWE
- Height: 6 ft 0 in (183 cm)
- Weight: 196 lb (89 kg; 14 st 0 lb)
- Position: Defence
- Shot: Left
- Played for: AIK; Luleå HF
- NHL draft: 173rd overall, 1999; Mighty Ducks of Anaheim
- Playing career: 1997–2018

Jan Allan Sandström (born January 24, 1978) is a Swedish former professional ice hockey player who last played with the Luleå HF team in the Swedish Hockey League (SHL), where he has played since 2001. He was born in Luleå, but grew up in Piteå.

Sandström is known for preferring the Wrist shot technique when shooting the puck. This has earned him the nicknames Janne Wristhot and Janne the Wrister.

During the 2016–17 SHL season, Sandström surpassed David Petrasek as the player with the most career Swedish Hockey League (formerly Elitserien) games played.

== Career statistics ==
			Regular season					Playoffs
Season	Team	League	GP	G	A	Pts	PIM	GP	G	A	Pts	PIM
1994–95	Piteå HC	Division 1	12	1	0	1	4	—	—	—	—	—
1995–96	Piteå HC	Division 1	29	1	11	12	18	—	—	—	—	—
1996–97	Piteå HC	Division 1	28	3	4	7	28	—	—	—	—	—
1997–98	AIK IF	SHL	38	0	2	2	16	10	0	0	0	0
1998–99	AIK IF	SHL	47	2	7	9	18	—	—	—	—	—
1999–00	AIK IF	SHL	49	2	6	8	22	—	—	—	—	—
2000–01	AIK IF	SHL	18	1	3	4	10	—	—	—	—	—
2000–01	Skellefteå AIK	Allsvenskan	22	0	5	5	14	—	—	—	—	—
2001–02	Luleå HF J20	J20 SuperElit	1	1	0	1	0	—	—	—	—	—
2001–02	Luleå HF	SHL	41	2	4	6	12	5	0	2	2	2
2002–03	Luleå HF	SHL	48	3	5	8	36	4	1	0	1	6
2003–04	Luleå HF	SHL	49	1	10	11	20	5	0	1	1	2
2004–05	Luleå HF	SHL	41	2	5	7	30	4	0	0	0	0
2005–06	Luleå HF	SHL	49	6	16	22	60	6	0	1	1	10
2006–07	Luleå HF	SHL	51	7	15	22	52	3	0	0	0	0
2007–08	Luleå HF	SHL	53	7	9	16	44	—	—	—	—	—
2008–09	Luleå HF	SHL	53	5	11	16	34	5	0	3	3	4
2009–10	Luleå HF	SHL	54	6	17	23	54	—	—	—	—	—
2010–11	Luleå HF	SHL	51	1	8	9	8	12	0	0	0	2
2011–12	Luleå HF	SHL	52	4	6	10	18	5	0	0	0	2
2012–13	Luleå HF	SHL	46	6	5	11	18	15	3	4	7	4
2013–14	Luleå HF	SHL	45	0	8	8	16	6	0	2	2	2
2014–15	Luleå HF	SHL	50	4	13	17	22	9	0	0	0	4
2015–16	Luleå HF	SHL	51	4	7	11	24	11	0	2	2	4
2016–17	Luleå HF	SHL	48	0	8	8	20	2	0	1	1	0
2017–18	Luleå HF	SHL	18	1	1	2	2	3	0	0	0	0
SHL totals			952	64	166	230	536	105	4	16	20	42
