= Linus Klasen =

Swedish ice hockey player

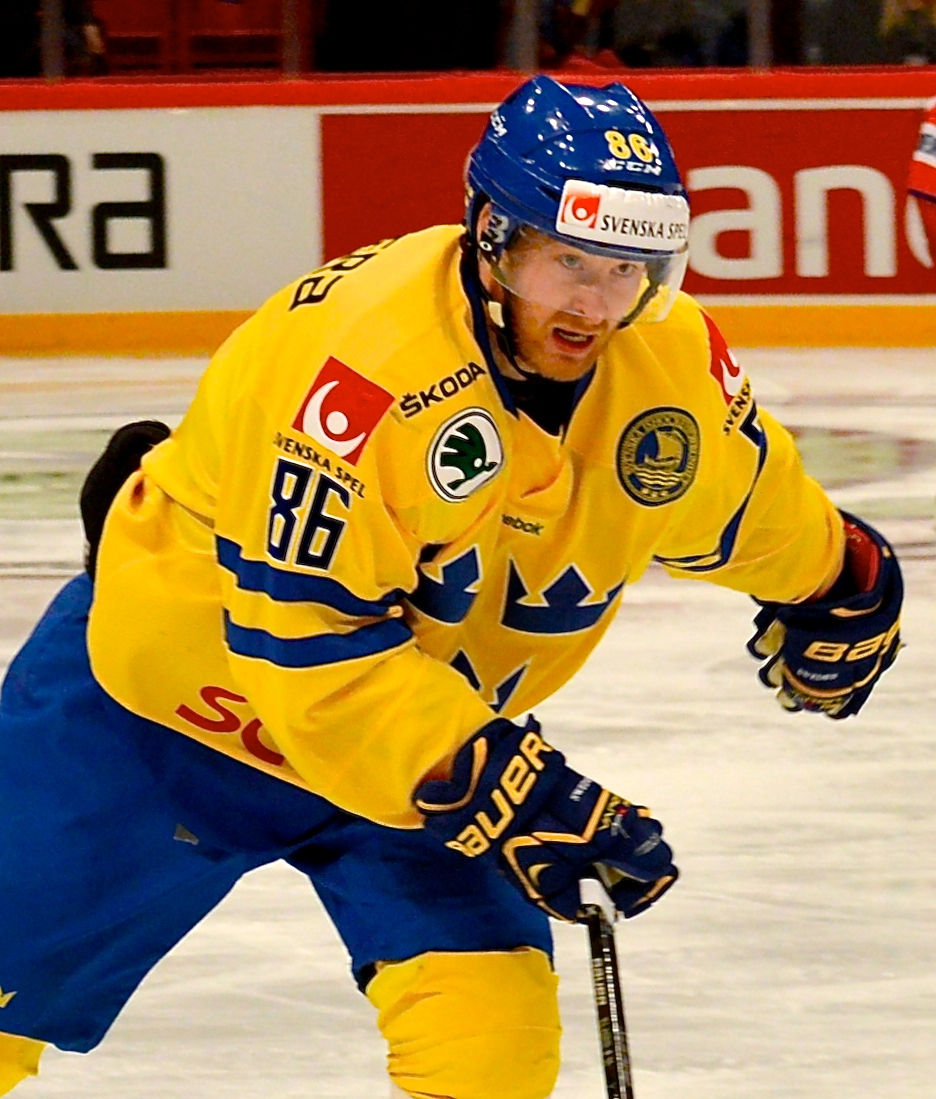
- Born: 19 February 1986 (age 40) Stockholm, Sweden
- Height: 5 ft 8 in (173 cm)
- Weight: 176 lb (80 kg; 12 st 8 lb)
- Position: Left wing
- Shoots: Left
- Hockeyettan team Former teams: Huddinge IK; Södertälje SK; Nashville Predators; Luleå HF; HC Lugano; Djurgårdens IF
- National team: Sweden
- NHL draft: Undrafted
- Playing career: 2004–present

Robert Linus Alexander Klasen (born 19 February 1986) is a Swedish professional ice hockey player who is currently playing for Huddinge IK of the Hockeyettan.

== Playing career ==
Klasen started his career with Huddinge IK and has played with Södertälje SK in the Swedish Elitserien. He played 3 games with team Sweden in the 2007–08 season.

On 30 October 2010 Klassen made his NHL debut with the Nashville Predators in an away game against the Detroit Red Wings.

Klasen signed a three-year contract with the Malmö Redhawks of the HockeyAllsvenskan on 17 May 2011. He was immediately appointed the team's captain. The contract included an annual salary of 4 million SEK ($0.6 million USD), making him the best paid ice hockey player in Sweden. He scored 50 points (20 goals, 30 assists) in 52 games and helped the team reach a playoff spot. However, due to the economic crisis in the Redhawks club, Klasen was forced to leave the club after the 2011–12 season. His contract is being paid out by the Redhawks.

Following the 2011–12 season, Klasen signed a two-year contract with Luleå HF of the Swedish top-tier league Elitserien (SEL), before the 2012–13 season. He will keep the same annual salary from Malmö Redhawks during these two years.

After the final year of his contract with Luleå, in which Klasen compiled his most prolific SHL season with 28 goals and 57 points in just 54 games, he left as a free agent to sign a lucrative four-year contract with Swiss club, HC Lugano, of the NLA on 2 April 2014. In his debut season with Lugano in the NLA, Klasen finished second in team scoring with 55 points in 46 games to be selected in the 2014–15 NLA All-Star Team.

After 6 seasons and 265 games with HC Lugano in the NL, Klasen was not offered a contract extension and decided to return to his native Sweden by signing a two-year deal with Luleå HF of the SHL.

On 10 May 2021, Klasen joined EHC Visp of the second tier Swiss League (SL) on a two-year contract.

== Career statistics ==
=== Regular season and playoffs ===
			Regular season					Playoffs
Season	Team	League	GP	G	A	Pts	PIM	GP	G	A	Pts	PIM
2004–05	Lincoln Stars	USHL	26	7	9	16	13	—	—	—	—	—
2004–05	Huddinge IK	Allsv	2	0	0	0	0	—	—	—	—	—
2005–06	Huddinge IK	Div.1	35	22	40	62	36	8	2	11	13	12
2006–07	Huddinge IK	Allsv	44	16	34	50	28	8	3	10	13	2
2007–08	Södertälje SK	SEL	52	14	20	34	24	—	—	—	—	—
2008–09	Södertälje SK	SEL	53	14	15	29	8	—	—	—	—	—
2009–10	Södertälje SK	SEL	51	19	32	51	20	—	—	—	—	—
2010–11	Milwaukee Admirals	AHL	47	22	23	45	20	—	—	—	—	—
2010–11	Nashville Predators	NHL	4	0	0	0	0	—	—	—	—	—
2011–12	Malmö Redhawks	Allsv	51	20	30	50	24	6	4	7	11	2
2012–13	Luleå HF	SEL	47	10	14	24	18	14	4	8	12	4
2013–14	Luleå HF	SHL	54	28	29	57	45	6	2	2	4	0
2014–15	HC Lugano	NLA	46	20	35	55	10	6	1	4	5	0
2015–16	HC Lugano	NLA	49	14	35	49	18	15	5	12	17	8
2016–17	HC Lugano	NLA	50	11	37	48	30	11	1	6	7	8
2017–18	HC Lugano	NL	43	12	26	38	24	3	0	0	0	0
2018–19	HC Lugano	NL	31	6	21	27	18	1	0	0	0	0
2019–20	HC Lugano	NL	46	8	26	34	22	—	—	—	—	—
2020–21	Luleå HF	SHL	50	14	28	42	43	7	0	6	6	2
2021–22	EHC Visp	SL	43	18	39	57	45	6	4	2	6	8
2022–23	EHC Visp	SL	8	2	10	12	12	—	—	—	—	—
2022–23	Djurgårdens IF	Allsv	24	5	13	18	12	15	6	10	16	2
2023–24	Djurgårdens IF	Allsv	47	19	28	47	35	15	3	9	12	27
2024–25	Djurgårdens IF	Allsv	39	16	23	39	22	16	9	7	16	2
SHL totals			307	99	138	237	160	20	6	10	16	4
NHL totals			4	0	0	0	0	—	—	—	—	—

=== International ===
Medal record

Representing Sweden

Ice hockey

World Championships
Bronze medal – third place	2014 Minsk	

Men's Inline Hockey

World Championships
Gold medal – first place	2007 Landshut	
Gold medal – first place	2008 Bratislava	
Gold medal – first place	2009 Ingolstadt	

Year	Team	Event	Result	GP	G	A	Pts	PIM
2014	Sweden	WC	3rd place, bronze medalist(s)	10	2	7	9	8
2016	Sweden	WC	6th	7	1	1	2	0
Senior totals				17	3	8	11	8

== Inline Hockey ==
Linus has competed for Sweden at the 2007, 2008 and 2009 IIHF Inline Hockey World Championships.
