= Simon Hjalmarsson =

Swedish ice hockey player

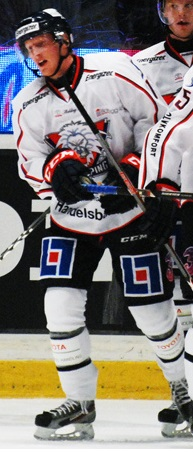
- Born: February 1, 1989 (age 37) Gislaved, Sweden
- Height: 6 ft 0 in (183 cm)
- Weight: 172 lb (78 kg; 12 st 4 lb)
- Position: Right wing
- Shoots: Left
- Liiga team (P) Cur. team Former teams: Vaasan Sport; Rögle BK (SHL); Frölunda HC; Luleå HF; Linköpings HC; CSKA Moscow; Graz99ers
- National team: Sweden
- NHL draft: 39th overall, 2007; St. Louis Blues
- Playing career: 2007–present

Mats Simon Hjalmarsson (born February 1, 1989) is a Swedish professional ice hockey forward. He is currently playing with Vaasan Sport in the Finnish Liiga.

== Playing career ==
In the 2006–07 season, he played for the Frölunda HC in the J20 SuperElit league and Gislaveds SK in the Division I. He was among the very best players in the Swedish U20 league, scoring 54 points in 41 games. He was consequently selected by the St. Louis Blues, 39th overall, in the 2007 NHL entry draft.

On June 4, 2014, Hjalmarsson signed a one-year, two-way contract with the Columbus Blue Jackets of the National Hockey League. He was signed under the influence of general manager Jarmo Kekäläinen, who previously drafted Hjalmarrson whilst as a scout for the St. Louis Blues. After attending the Blue Jackets training camp for the 2014–15 season, Hjalmarsson failed to make an impression with the club and was initially reassigned to American Hockey League affiliate, the Springfield Falcons on October 3, 2014. With little interest to play North American minor league hockey, Hjalmarsson was placed on unconditional waivers to mutually terminate his contract with the Blue Jackets. On October 15, 2014, Hjalmarsson signalled an intent to play in the KHL when his rights were traded by his draft team, HC Sibir Novosibirsk, to CSKA Moscow. On October 28, 2014, he eventually signed a two-year contract with the club.

Hjalmarsson returned to Sweden after the end of the 2015–16 season, signing for a second time with Frölunda HC of the Swedish Hockey League (SHL).

== Career statistics ==
=== Regular season and playoffs ===
			Regular season					Playoffs
Season	Team	League	GP	G	A	Pts	PIM	GP	G	A	Pts	PIM
2005–06	Frölunda HC	J20	31	8	10	18	8	7	2	3	5	2
2006–07	Frölunda HC	J20	41	31	23	54	91	8	1	1	2	6
2007–08	Frölunda HC	J20	37	16	30	46	104	8	3	9	12	8
2007–08	Frölunda HC	SEL	1	0	0	0	2	—	—	—	—	—
2007–08	Borås HC	Allsv	10	2	4	6	4	—	—	—	—	—
2008–09	Borås HC	Allsv	40	14	19	33	28	—	—	—	—	—
2008–09	Frölunda HC	J20	2	2	0	2	2	5	8	2	10	2
2009–10	Rögle BK	SEL	53	11	9	20	16	—	—	—	—	—
2010–11	Luleå HF	SEL	55	8	21	29	16	13	2	3	5	2
2011–12	Luleå HF	SEL	53	19	17	36	8	5	1	1	2	4
2012–13	Linköpings HC	SEL	55	12	31	43	10	10	5	6	11	8
2013–14	Linköpings HC	SHL	55	27	30	57	87	14	5	4	9	2
2014–15	CSKA Moscow	KHL	33	11	13	24	6	16	5	6	11	4
2015–16	CSKA Moscow	KHL	28	3	10	13	2	14	2	4	6	10
2016–17	Frölunda HC	SHL	51	5	11	16	8	14	6	4	10	0
2017–18	Frölunda HC	SHL	51	8	23	31	22	6	0	1	1	2
2018–19	Frölunda HC	SHL	52	15	18	33	26	15	5	9	14	8
2019–20	Frölunda HC	SHL	50	16	20	36	26	—	—	—	—	—
2020–21	Frölunda HC	SHL	51	6	14	20	10	7	0	2	2	4
2021–22	Graz99ers	ICEHL	47	8	31	39	10	2	1	2	3	0
2022–23	Vaasan Sport	Liiga	45	12	30	42	20	—	—	—	—	—
SHL totals			526	127	194	321	231	84	24	30	54	30

Medal record

Representing Sweden

Ice hockey

World Championships
Gold medal – first place	2013 Sweden/Finland	
Bronze medal – third place	2014 Belarus	

World Junior Championships
Silver medal – second place	2009 Canada	

World U18 Championships
Bronze medal – third place	2007 Finland	

=== International ===
Year	Team	Event	Result	GP	G	A	Pts	PIM
2007	Sweden	WJC18	3rd place, bronze medalist(s)	6	4	5	9	4
2009	Sweden	WJC	2nd place, silver medalist(s)	6	4	2	6	4
2013	Sweden	WC	1st place, gold medalist(s)	10	2	2	4	4
2014	Sweden	WC	3rd place, bronze medalist(s)	10	1	0	1	4
2015	Sweden	WC	5th	8	0	2	2	0
Junior totals				12	8	7	15	8
Senior totals				28	3	4	7	8

== Awards and honors ==
Award	Year
CHL
Champions (Frölunda HC)	2017, 2019
SHL
Le Mat Trophy (Frölunda HC)	2019
