= David Ullström =

Swedish professional ice hockey player (born 1989)

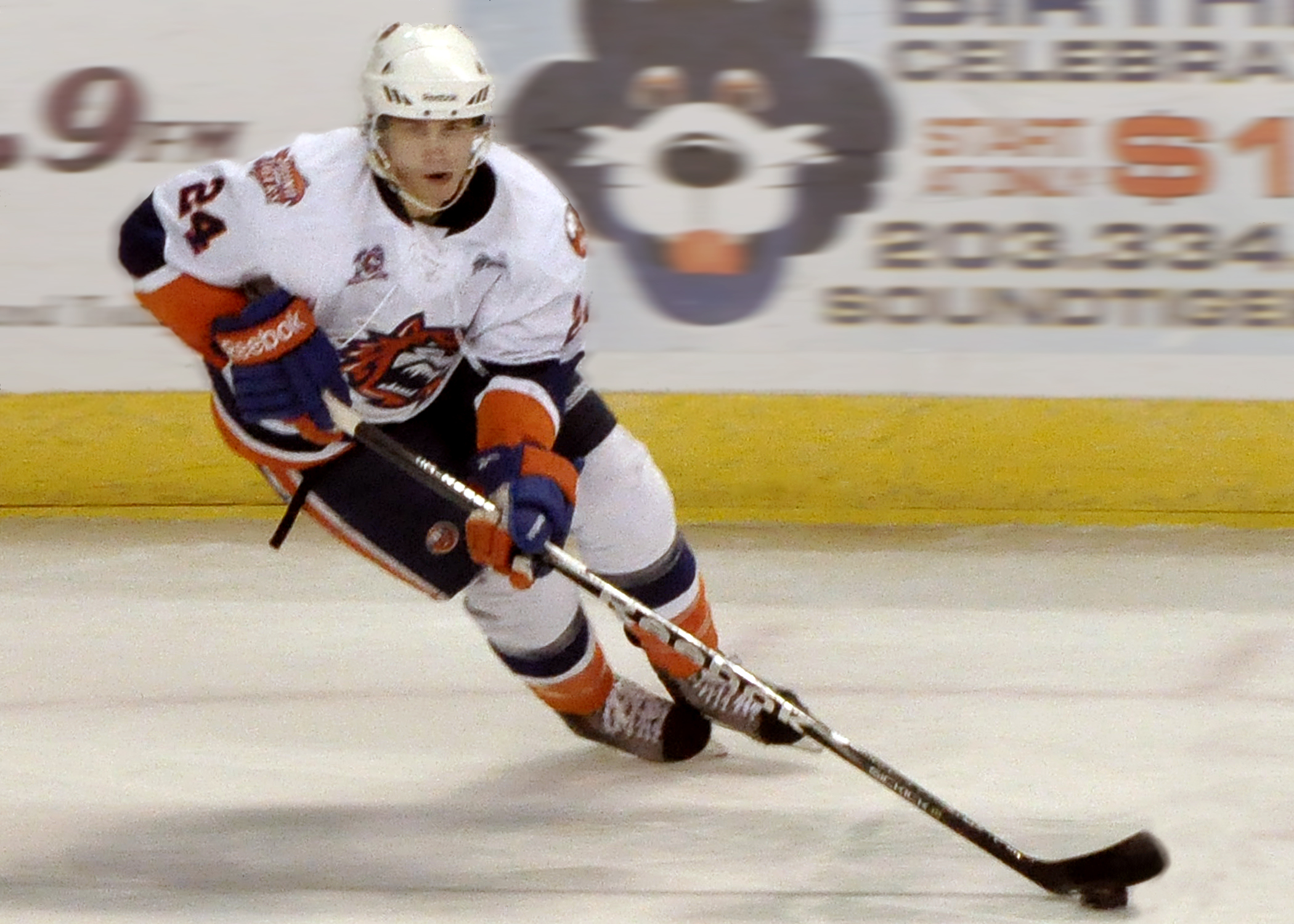
- Born: April 22, 1989 (age 37) Jönköping, Sweden
- Height: 6 ft 3 in (191 cm)
- Weight: 198 lb (90 kg; 14 st 2 lb)
- Position: Centre
- Shot: Left
- Played for: HV71; New York Islanders; Lokomotiv Yaroslavl; HC Lev Praha; Severstal Cherepovets; Sibir Novosibirsk; HC Dinamo Minsk; Dinamo Riga; EHC Biel; HC Davos; Schwenninger Wild Wings
- NHL draft: 102nd overall, 2008; New York Islanders
- Playing career: 2008–2023

David Jakob Ullström (born April 22, 1989) is a Swedish former professional ice hockey player. He last played with Schwenninger Wild Wings in the Deutsche Eishockey Liga (DEL). He was selected by the New York Islanders in the 4th round (102nd overall) of the 2008 NHL entry draft.

== Playing career ==
On June 1, 2010, Ullström was signed by the New York Islanders to a three-year entry-level contract. He scored his first career point on November 29, 2011, assisting on Brian Rolston's 3rd period goal against the Buffalo Sabres in a 2–1 win. On December 6, Ullström scored his first NHL goal against Mathieu Garon of the Tampa Bay Lightning.

On June 18, 2013, Lokomotiv Yaroslavl signed Ullström to a contract for the 2013–14 season. Scoring just 3 goals in 18 games with Lokomotiv, Ullström transferred to HC Lev Praha for the remainder of the campaign. Establishing a scoring presence within Praha, he helped the club advance to the Gagarin Cup finals.

On June 25, 2014, Ullström opted to remain in the KHL, signing for his third club, Severstal Cherepovets on a two-year deal.

On May 15, 2018, Ullström returned to the NHL after five seasons in Europe by signing a one-year, two-way contract with the Arizona Coyotes. He began the 2018–19 season on the injured reserve and upon returning to health was assigned by the Coyotes to AHL affiliate, the Tucson Roadrunners for the duration of his contract. He recorded 10 goals and 23 points in 29 games for the Roadrunners.

Unable to break into the NHL, Ullström returned to Europe, signing a contract with Latvian-based club, Dinamo Riga of the KHL, on May 30, 2019.

On January 11, 2021, Ullström was traded, along with Valentin Nüssbaumer, to HC Davos in exchanger for Luca Hischier and Perttu Lindgren.

In the 2022–23 season, he was signed to a one-year contract with the Schwenninger Wild Wings of the Deutsche Eishockey Liga (DEL). He featured in only 17 regular season games with the Wild Wings, contributing with 5 points. Unable to help Schwenninger advance to the post-season, it was announced Ullström would leave the club at the conclusion of his contract on March 9, 2022.

== Career statistics ==
=== Regular season and playoffs ===
			Regular Season					Playoffs
Season	Team	League	GP	G	A	Pts	PIM	GP	G	A	Pts	PIM
2007–08	HV71	SEL	7	0	0	0	0	—	—	—	—	—
2008–09	HV71	SEL	19	1	3	4	6	14	1	0	1	4
2008–09	Borås	Allsv	15	9	7	16	22	—	—	—	—	—
2009–10	HV71	SEL	47	5	11	16	27	16	2	0	2	0
2010–11	Bridgeport Sound Tigers	AHL	67	17	24	41	36	—	—	—	—	—
2011–12	Bridgeport Sound Tigers	AHL	40	24	6	30	22	3	1	1	2	4
2011–12	New York Islanders	NHL	29	4	4	8	6	—	—	—	—	—
2012–13	Bridgeport Sound Tigers	AHL	33	9	17	26	14	—	—	—	—	—
2012–13	New York Islanders	NHL	20	2	3	5	6	3	0	1	1	0
2013–14	Lokomotiv Yaroslavl	KHL	18	3	1	4	6	—	—	—	—	—
2013–14	HC Lev Praha	KHL	27	5	6	11	10	10	4	1	5	2
2014–15	Severstal Cherepovets	KHL	25	2	5	7	6	—	—	—	—	—
2014–15	Sibir Novosibirsk	KHL	23	9	6	15	22	16	5	1	6	12
2015–16	Sibir Novosibirsk	KHL	37	16	12	28	12	10	1	2	3	14
2016–17	HC Dinamo Minsk	KHL	3	0	1	1	0	—	—	—	—	—
2016–17	HV71	SHL	5	1	1	2	0	2	1	1	2	0
2017–18	HV71	SHL	47	6	24	30	26	2	0	0	0	0
2018–19	Tucson Roadrunners	AHL	29	10	13	23	14	—	—	—	—	—
2019–20	Dinamo Riga	KHL	11	2	3	5	2	—	—	—	—	—
2019–20	EHC Biel	NL	28	10	20	30	35	—	—	—	—	—
2020–21	EHC Biel	NL	11	0	5	5	6	—	—	—	—	—
2020–21	HC La Chaux-de-Fonds	SL	1	1	1	2	4	—	—	—	—	—
2020–21	HC Davos	NL	22	7	13	20	20	1	0	0	0	0
2021–22	HV71	Allsv	3	0	0	0	27	—	—	—	—	—
2022–23	Schwenninger Wild Wings	DEL	17	2	3	5	6	—	—	—	—	—
SHL totals			125	13	39	52	59	34	4	1	5	4
NHL totals			49	6	7	13	12	3	0	1	1	0
KHL totals			144	37	34	71	58	36	10	4	14	28

=== International ===
Medal record

Representing Sweden

Ice hockey

World Junior Championships
Silver medal – second place	2009 Ottawa	

Year	Team	Event	Result	GP	G	A	Pts	PIM
2009	Sweden	WJC	2nd place, silver medalist(s)	6	2	2	4	2
Junior totals				6	2	2	4	2

== Awards and honors ==
Award	Year
SHL
Le Mat trophy (HV71)	2010, 2017
