= Christian Engstrand =

Swedish ice hockey player

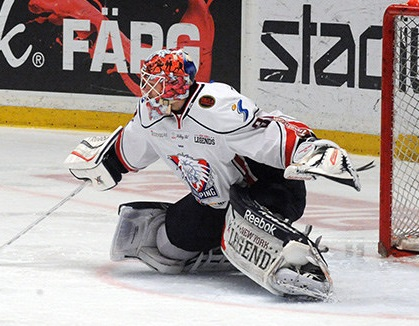
- Born: November 8, 1988 (age 36); Linköping, Sweden
- Height: 6 ft 0 in (183 cm)
- Weight: 201 lb (91 kg; 14 st 5 lb)
- Position: Goaltender
- Catches: Left
- ICEHL team Former teams: Graz99ers; Linköpings HC; IK Oskarshamn; IF Troja-Ljungby; Almtuna IS; AIK; Fehérvár AV19; Espoo Blues; Mora IK; Kristianstads IK; HC Vita Hästen; HC Nové Zámky
- Playing career: 2007–present

Christian Engstrand (born November 8, 1988) is a Swedish professional ice hockey goaltender. He is currently under contract with Graz99ers of the ICE Hockey League (ICEHL).

== Playing career ==
Engstrand has previously played for Mora IK of the HockeyAllsvenskan (Allsv). Engstrand signed for Medveščak Zagreb, a Croatian team in the KHL on August 19, 2014. After just one preseason game with Zagreb, Engstrand was released by the club on August 29, 2014.

Following a shortened stint with HC Nové Zámky, Engstrand left the club after 9 games and joined Austrian based, Graz99ers of the ICEHL.
