= Linus Persson (ice hockey) =

Swedish ice hockey player

- Born: December 29, 1985 (age 39); Hagfors, Sweden
- Height: 5 ft 11 in (180 cm)
- Weight: 196 lb (89 kg; 14 st 0 lb)
- Position: Right wing
- Shoots: Right
- SHL team Former teams: Leksands IF; Frölunda HC; Luleå HF; Färjestad BK
- Playing career: 2003–present

Lars Linus Persson (born December 29, 1985) is a Swedish professional ice hockey right winger, currently playing for Leksands IF in the Swedish Hockey League (SHL). Persson won TV-pucken with Värmland in 2000, won four Swedish Junior Championships with Västra Frölunda HC in 2002 and 2003 (under-20 and under-18), won promotion to Elitserien with Rögle BK in the 2008 Kvalserien, and won the 2012 European Trophy with Luleå HF.

Persson has represented Sweden at two International Ice Hockey Federation (IIHF)-sanctioned events; the 2003 IIHF World U18 Championships and the 2005 World Junior Ice Hockey Championships.

== Playing career ==
Persson started playing hockey in his youth with IK Viking, in his hometown Hagfors. He won TV-pucken with Värmland in 2000, scoring six goals and a total of eleven points in eight games. For the 2001–02 season Persson signed with Västra Frölunda HC to play for their junior organisation, and attend the hockey gymnasium in Gothenburg. Persson spent the majority of the season with the under 20 team in the J20 SuperElit. Playing 35 games, Persson scored six goals and ten assists for a total of 16 points. In the playoffs Persson played five games, scoring one goal and an assist as Frölunda won the Swedish under 20 Championship. Having played just three games with the under 18 team during the regular season, scoring one goal, Persson joined the team for the playoffs, leading Frölunda to a gold medal in the Swedish under 18 Championship by scoring four goals in a 10–1 win against Huddinge IK in the first game of the finals. He became the playoff leading scorer with six goals and three assists for nine points in three games. The following season Persson played 30 games in the J20 SuperElit, scoring ten goals and 19 assists, and five assists in six playoff games as Frölunda captured a consecutive gold medal in the Swedish under 20 Championships. Not having played with the under 18 team during the regular season, Persson appeared in two playoff games, assisting on two goals in the quarterfinals against Leksands IF, and scoring one goal and an assist in the decisive game two of the final against Modo Hockey, which Frölunda won 6–1, winning consecutive gold medals at the under 18 Swedish Championship as well. For the 2003–04 Persson was named captain of Frölunda's under 20 team. He played 36 games in the J20 SuperElit, scoring nine goals, 24 assists for 33 points. During the season Persson was called up to Frölunda's senior team, playing in two exhibition games and was on the roster for one game in Elitserien—Sweden's premier men's league—on December 28 in a 4–0 win against Timrå IK, though not receiving any time on the ice. In the J20 SuperElit playoffs Persson played five games, scoring one goal and five assists as Frölunda were eliminated in the semifinal against Modo Hockey.

After the season, Persson was offered a contract by Frölunda to continue playing junior hockey and be used as a thirteenth forward with the senior team, but chose to sign a two-year contract with Hammarby IF in HockeyAllsvenskan—Sweden's second tier men's league. Persson only played 13 games with Hammarby's senior team before being loaned to AIK in Division 1—Sweden's third tier men's league—where he played five games, scoring three goals and two assists.

After four successful seasons in Karlskoga, Persson signed a two-year contract with Luleå HF in Elitserien. Persson scored nine goals and eleven assists for 20 points in 51 games. On April 4, 2013, Linus Persson scored his fifth Elitserien playoff goal of his career, just twelve seconds into overtime of Game 4 against Färjestad BK, which broke the record for the fastest overtime goal ever scored in Elitserien playoff history. With eight goals and four assists in 15 games Persson was the scoring leader in the 2013 Swedish Championship playoffs. He led Luleå to the final where they lost the best-of-seven series in four games to Skellefteå AIK.

== Career statistics ==
=== Regular season and playoffs ===
			Regular season					Playoffs
Season	Team	League	GP	G	A	Pts	PIM	GP	G	A	Pts	PIM
2001–02	Frölunda HC	J20	35	6	10	16	8	5	1	1	2	0
2002–03	Frölunda HC	J20	30	10	19	29	18	6	0	5	5	0
2003–04	Frölunda HC	J20	36	9	24	33	32	5	1	5	6	4
2003–04	Frölunda HC	SEL	1	0	0	0	0	—	—	—	—	—
2004–05	Hammarby IF	J20	11	6	6	12	8	—	—	—	—	—
2004–05	Hammarby IF	SWE-2	13	0	1	1	2	—	—	—	—	—
2004–05	AIK	SWE-3	5	3	2	5	2	—	—	—	—	—
2005–06	Hammarby IF	SWE-2	42	9	16	25	26	8	4	6	10	6
2006–07	IFK Arboga IK	SWE-2	23	2	7	9	16	—	—	—	—	—
2006–07	Leksands IF	SWE-2	22	3	3	6	8	5	0	0	0	2
2007–08	Rögle BK	J20	1	1	1	2	0	—	—	—	—	—
2007–08	Rögle BK	SWE-2	37	3	6	9	31	10	0	1	1	2
2008–09	BIK Karlskoga	SWE-2	45	17	17	34	30	—	—	—	—	—
2009–10	BIK Karlskoga	SWE-2	49	12	27	39	14	2	0	0	0	0
2010–11	BIK Karlskoga	SWE-2	46	7	28	35	10	—	—	—	—	—
2011–12	BIK Karlskoga	SWE-2	51	19	32	51	22	10	4	3	7	2
2012–13	Luleå HF	SEL	51	9	11	20	4	15	8	4	12	6
2013–14	Luleå HF	SHL	55	9	6	15	8	6	1	0	1	2
2014–15	Färjestad BK	SHL	50	8	12	20	10	2	3	0	3	0
2015–16	Färjestad BK	SHL	51	13	10	23	12	4	0	0	0	0
2016–17	Färjestad BK	SHL	49	8	4	12	6	7	0	1	1	4
2017–18	Färjestad BK	SHL	43	7	8	15	20	5	0	1	1	2
2018–19	Leksands IF	SWE-2	48	11	26	37	34	12	3	6	9	8
SHL totals			300	54	51	105	60	39	12	6	18	14

=== International ===
Year	Team	Event	GP	G	A	Pts	PIM
2003	Sweden	WJC18	6	1	6	7	4
2005	Sweden	WJC	2	2	0	2	0
Junior totals			8	3	6	9	4
