= Oscar Möller =

Swedish ice hockey player

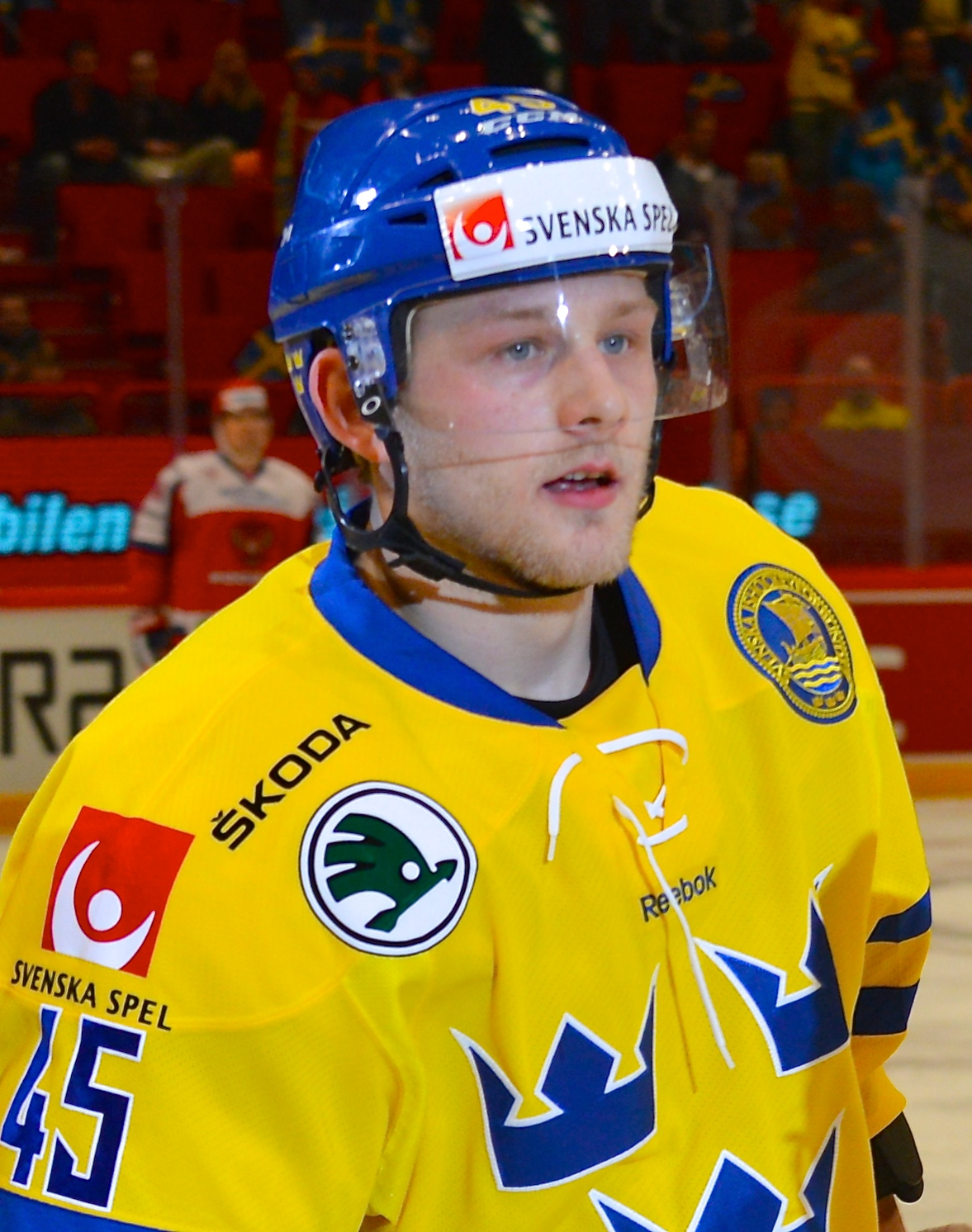
- Born: 22 January 1989 (age 37) Stockholm, Sweden
- Height: 5 ft 10 in (178 cm)
- Weight: 181 lb (82 kg; 12 st 13 lb)
- Position: Right wing
- Shot: Right
- Played for: Los Angeles Kings; Skellefteå AIK; Ak Bars Kazan
- National team: Sweden
- NHL draft: 52nd overall, 2007; Los Angeles Kings
- Playing career: 2006–2023

Oscar Möller (born 22 January 1989) is a Swedish former professional ice hockey right winger who last played for Skellefteå AIK of the Swedish Hockey League (SHL).

== Playing career ==
Möller began his junior hockey career in his native Sweden with Spånga IF IK and Djurgårdens IF. He moved to North America for his draft year in 2006–07 to play major junior in the Western Hockey League (WHL) for the Chilliwack Bruins.

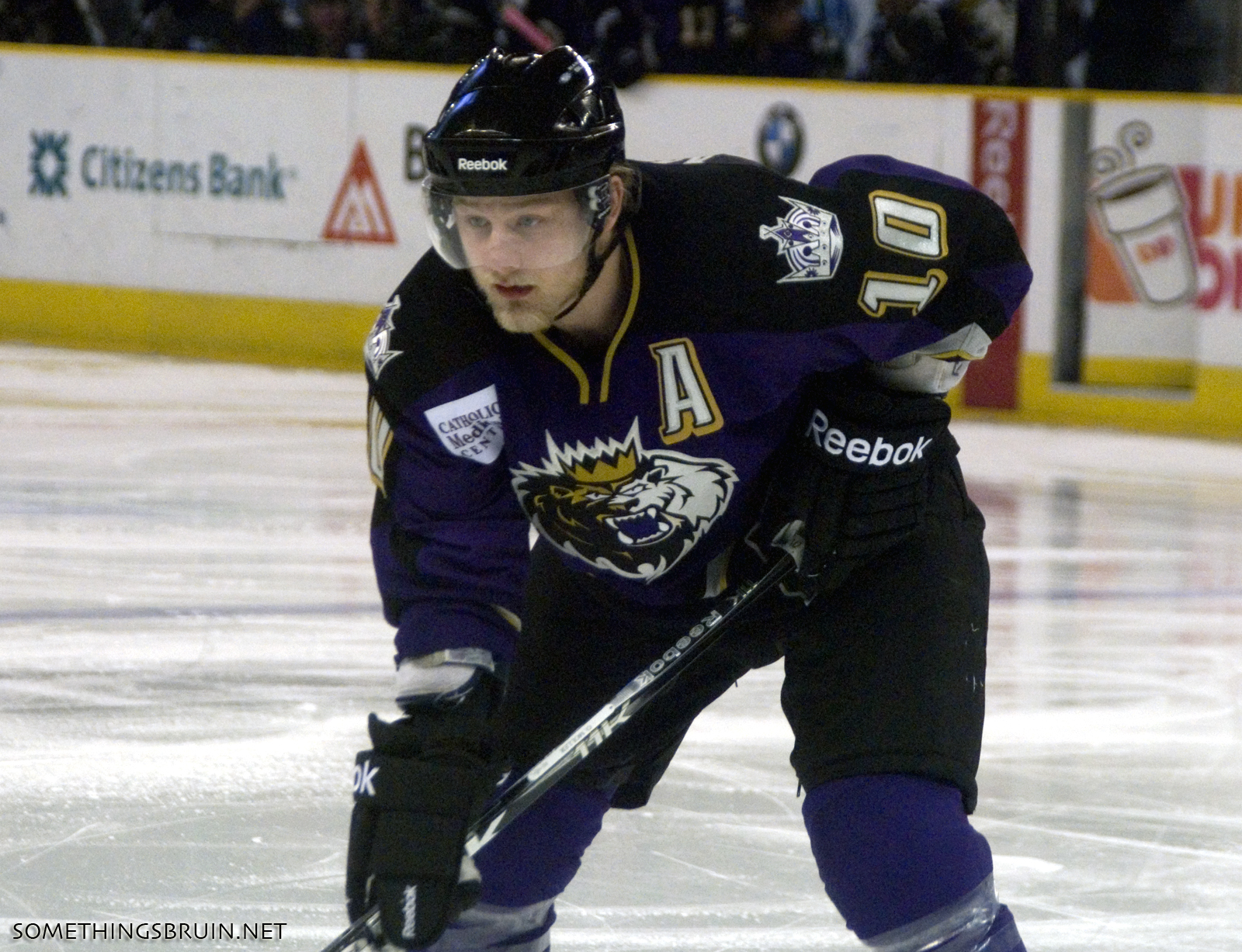
Moller with the Monarchs.

Producing at a point-per-game pace with 69 points in 68 games, he was drafted by the Los Angeles Kings in the second round, 52nd overall, of the 2007 NHL entry draft. He returned to the Bruins for one more season and improved to 83 points, earning him a spot on the WHL West First All-Star Team. In the off-season, on 22 April 2008, the Los Angeles Kings signed Möller to a three-year, entry-level contract.

He began playing with the Kings in 2008–09 and scored his first career NHL goal on 20 October 2008 against Peter Budaj in a 4–3 loss to the Colorado Avalanche. Midway through his rookie season, the Kings lent him to Team Sweden for the 2009 World Junior Championships. However, Möller fractured his clavicle during the tournament and was unable to make an immediate return to the Kings' lineup.

On 19 May 2011, after completing his entry-level contract with the Kings and with his NHL rights still retained, Möller signed a two-year contract to return to Sweden with Skellefteå AIK of the Elitserien. Möller scored his first Elitserien goal in the season opener against Färjestad BK on 15 September 2011.

After missing the entire 2023–24 season with exhaustion syndrome, Möller had hoped to resume his career, but on 7 October 2024, he announced his retirement with a statement on Skellefteå's website and social media channels.

== International play ==
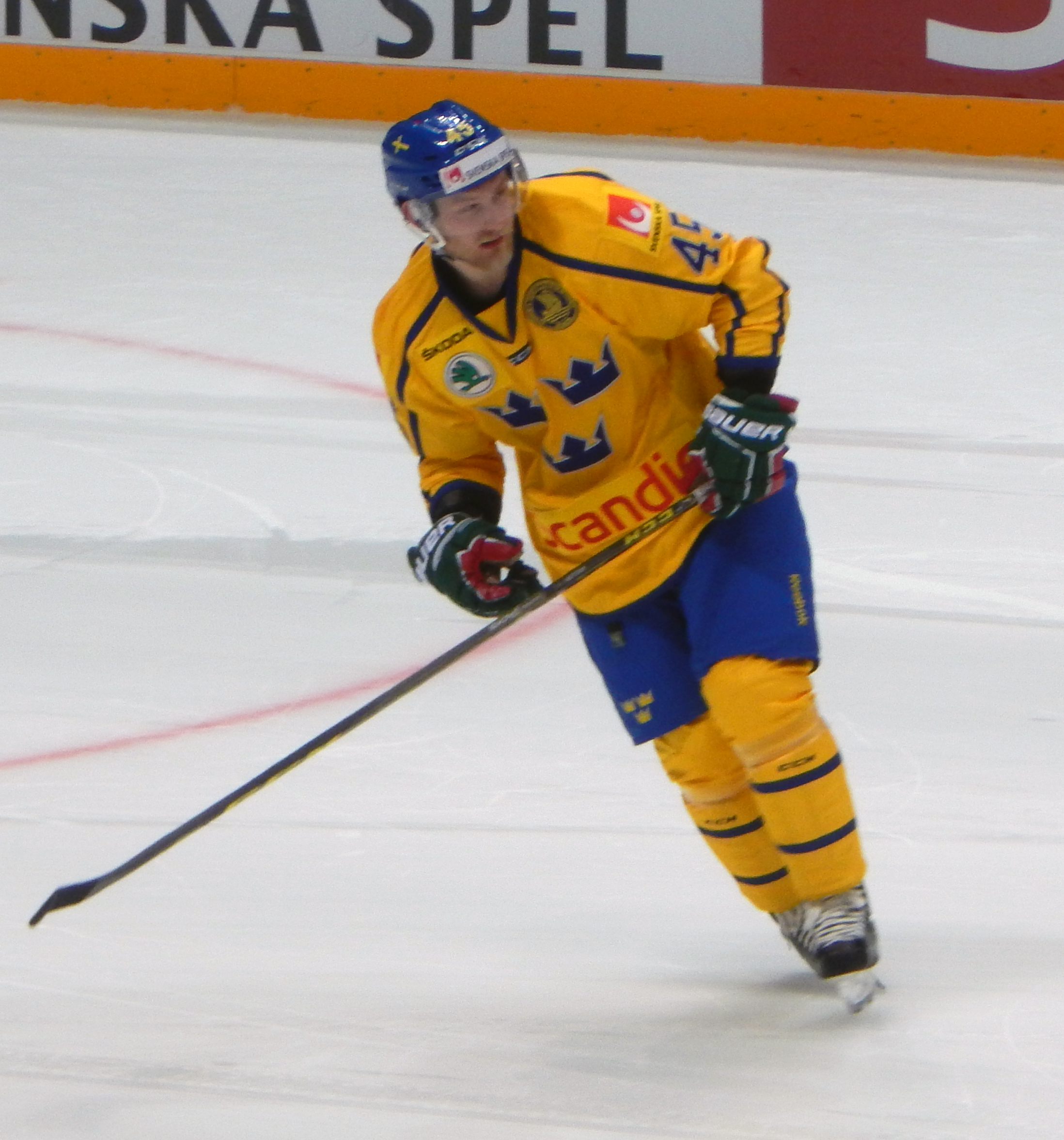
- Möller at 2015 Channel One Cup

Medal record

Representing Sweden

Ice hockey

World Championships
Bronze medal – third place	2014 Minsk	

World Junior Championships
Silver medal – second place	2009 Canada	
Silver medal – second place	2008 Czech Republic	

IIHF U18 Championships
Bronze medal – third place	2007 Finland	

In his second year of major junior, Möller represented Sweden at the 2008 World Junior Championships in the Czech Republic. He contributed 5 points in 6 games as Team Canada defeated Sweden in the gold medal game 3–2 in overtime. The following year, Möller was lent to Sweden's under-20 team by the Los Angeles Kings to compete in his second World Junior Championships in Ottawa. He was chosen as team captain for Sweden but was kept from a second gold medal game against Team Canada due to a fractured clavicle, suffered against Russia during the tournament. Despite not playing in the final, he earned another silver medal as Sweden was defeated 5–1.

== Career statistics ==
Bold indicates led league

=== Regular season and playoffs ===
			Regular season					Playoffs
Season	Team	League	GP	G	A	Pts	PIM	GP	G	A	Pts	PIM
2003–04	Spånga IS	J18	32	28	12	40	68	—	—	—	—	—
2004–05	Spånga IS	J18	24	28	16	44	52	—	—	—	—	—
2004–05	Spånga IS	J20 II	4	6	1	7	6	—	—	—	—	—
2004–05	Spånga IS	SWE.4	6	6	4	10	0	—	—	—	—	—
2005–06	Djurgårdens IF	J18	7	8	5	13	6	—	—	—	—	—
2005–06	Djurgårdens IF	J18 Allsv	1	0	0	0	0	2	1	0	1	0
2005–06	Djurgårdens IF	J20	25	8	5	13	41	4	2	0	2	0
2006–07	Chilliwack Bruins	WHL	68	32	37	69	50	5	0	3	3	6
2007–08	Chilliwack Bruins	WHL	69	39	44	83	42	4	2	1	3	4
2007–08	Manchester Monarchs	AHL	—	—	—	—	—	2	1	0	1	0
2008–09	Los Angeles Kings	NHL	40	7	8	15	16	—	—	—	—	—
2008–09	Manchester Monarchs	AHL	8	2	3	5	6	—	—	—	—	—
2009–10	Manchester Monarchs	AHL	43	15	18	33	20	16	2	5	7	0
2009–10	Los Angeles Kings	NHL	34	3	4	7	4	—	—	—	—	—
2010–11	Manchester Monarchs	AHL	59	23	27	50	34	—	—	—	—	—
2010–11	Los Angeles Kings	NHL	13	1	3	4	2	1	0	0	0	0
2011–12	Skellefteå AIK	SEL	54	14	17	31	6	19	7	8	15	8
2012–13	Skellefteå AIK	SEL	28	18	8	26	2	13	5	5	10	2
2013–14	Skellefteå AIK	SHL	48	27	18	45	14	14	5	13	18	2
2014–15	Ak Bars Kazan	KHL	54	14	18	32	6	20	9	3	12	4
2015–16	Ak Bars Kazan	KHL	58	15	22	37	20	7	0	1	1	4
2016–17	Skellefteå AIK	SHL	16	10	3	13	8	7	1	1	2	4
2017–18	Skellefteå AIK	SHL	49	18	24	42	6	16	8	5	13	6
2018–19	Skellefteå AIK	SHL	51	19	19	38	8	6	3	2	5	0
2019–20	Skellefteå AIK	SHL	50	20	17	37	10	—	—	—	—	—
2020–21	Skellefteå AIK	SHL	52	17	18	35	35	12	2	2	4	2
2021–22	Skellefteå AIK	SHL	49	16	18	34	18	6	0	2	2	0
2022–23	Skellefteå AIK	SHL	48	23	21	44	10	17	**7**	4	11	0
NHL totals			87	12	14	26	22	1	0	0	0	0
SHL totals			445	182	163	345	117	110	38	42	80	24
KHL totals			112	29	40	69	26	27	9	4	13	8

=== International ===
Year	Team	Event	Result	GP	G	A	Pts	PIM
2006	Sweden	IH18	4th	4	4	1	5	4
2007	Sweden	U18	3rd place, bronze medalist(s)	6	1	4	5	20
2008	Sweden	WJC	2nd place, silver medalist(s)	6	3	2	5	0
2009	Sweden	WJC	2nd place, silver medalist(s)	6	1	3	4	4
2014	Sweden	WC	3rd place, bronze medalist(s)	10	3	6	9	4
2018	Sweden	OG	5th	4	1	1	2	2
Junior totals				22	9	10	19	28
Senior totals				14	4	7	11	6

== Awards and honours ==
Award	Year
WHL
West First All-Star Team	2008
SHL
Le Mat Trophy (Skellefteå AIK)	2013, 2014
