= 2011–12 Elitserien season =

- League: Elitserien
- Sport: Ice hockey
- Duration: 13 September 2011 – 19 April 2012
- Total attendance: 2,109,819 (reg. season)
- Average attendance: 6,393 (reg. season)

Regular season
- League champion: Luleå HF
- Season MVP: Jakob Silfverberg (Brynäs IF)
- Top scorer: Robert Rosén (AIK)

Playoffs
- Playoffs MVP: Jakob Silfverberg (Brynäs IF)

Finals
- Champions: Brynäs IF
- Runners-up: Skellefteå AIK

SHL seasons
- ← 2010–11 2012–13 →

The 2011–12 Elitserien season was the 37th season of Elitserien. The regular season began on 13 September 2011 and ended on 6 March 2012. The following playoffs began on 10 March 2012 and ended on 19 April. Färjestad BK were the defending Swedish Champions. Brynäs IF won their first Swedish Championship title since 1999, as well as their 13th in history, after defeating Skellefteå AIK in six games.

The regular season was won by Luleå HF, for the first time since 1996, while Djurgårdens IF and Timrå IK were forced to play in the 2012 Kvalserien for survival in the highest division.

In Kvalserien, Timrå IK requalified and Rögle BK qualified for the 2012–13 Elitserien season at the expense of Djurgårdens IF.

To allow for local music events as well as other ice hockey ones, this season had three mid-season breaks: the first between 8–14 November 2011, the second between 12–20 December, and the third between 5–14 February 2012. To increase interest for Elitserien, the 2011–12 season's schedule was more active: from 14–29 November 2011 and 16–31 January 2012, there were Elitserien games every day (except for two days, 20 November and 22 January). Also, in the playoffs, there were quarterfinals every day (the four quarterfinal series were split into two quarterfinals per day).

A significant change in this Elitserien season was that the clubs wouldn't be fined for supporter incidents as long as the clubs correctly followed the security rules.

On 17 October 2011, the Swedish Police Authority decided that the police should be economically compensated for their efforts during sports events held by joint-stock companies (JSC). This mainly affected the league's two Stockholm clubs Djurgårdens IF and AIK. As a result, AIK were forced to sell forward Linus Videll to Yugra Khanty-Mansiysk of the Kontinental Hockey League (KHL) on 24 October 2011.

== Participating teams ==
Location of the participating clubs

Team	City	Arena	Capacity
AIK	Stockholm	Hovet^{1}	8,094
Brynäs IF	Gävle	Läkerol Arena	8,585
Djurgårdens IF	Stockholm	Hovet^{1}	8,094
Frölunda HC	Gothenburg	Scandinavium	12,044
Färjestad BK	Karlstad	Löfbergs Lila Arena	8,647
HV71	Jönköping	Kinnarps Arena	7,000
Linköpings HC	Linköping	Cloetta Center	8,500
Luleå HF	Luleå	Coop Norrbotten Arena	6,300
Modo Hockey	Örnsköldsvik	Fjällräven Center	7,600
Skellefteå AIK	Skellefteå	Skellefteå Kraft Arena	6,001
Timrå IK	Timrå	E.ON Arena	6,000
Växjö Lakers	Växjö	Vida Arena	5,329

The local derby games between AIK and Djurgårdens IF were played in the Ericsson Globe, which has a capacity of 13,850 spectators.

== Notable games ==
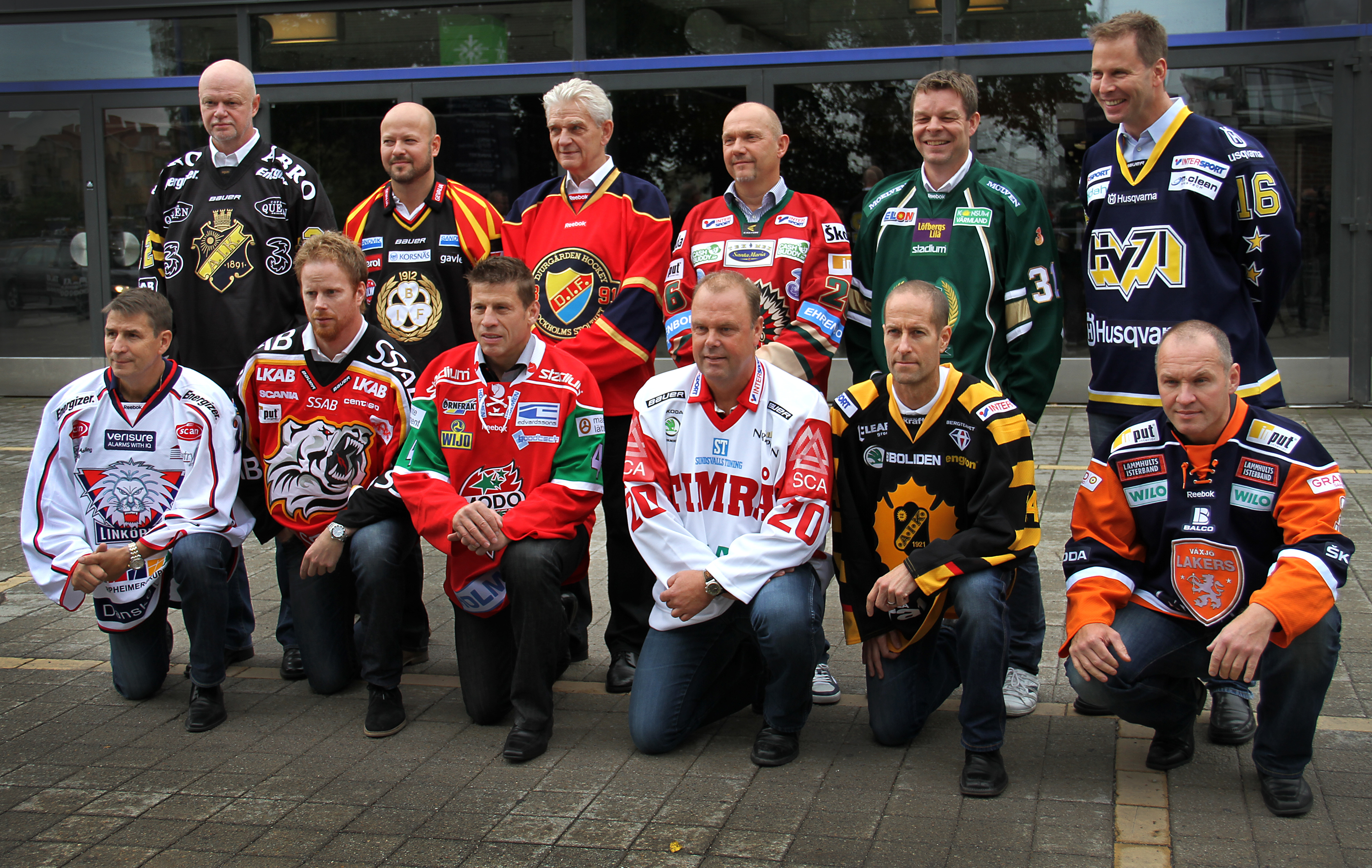
Head coaches of all twelve Elitserien teams, photographed in September 2011.

The first game of the season was played on 13 September 2011 between Frölunda HC and the Elitserien newcomers Växjö Lakers. The game counted as round 6 and was won by Frölunda 2–0 in front of an outsold Scandinavium, with Frölunda defenceman Christian Bäckman scoring the first goal of the season.

The first Småland derby game in Elitserien history was played on 8 October 2011 between reigning regular-season champions HV71 and Växjö Lakers, at Kinnarps Arena in Jönköping. In front of a sold out Kinnarps Arena—exactly 7,000 spectators—Växjö Lakers came out with a 3–2 victory in a shootout. Växjö Lakers forward Mike Iggulden scored three penalty shot goals in the game, two of them counted in the statistics.

On 22 September 2011, Linköpings HC forward Mikael Håkanson played his 912th Elitserien game—regulation and playoff games included—and thus wrote history as he surpassed previous record holder Roger Åkerström. However, Skellefteå AIK wiped out Linköping in that game with a 4–0 shutout win.

On 23 November 2011, Linköpings HC forward Andreas Jämtin became the most penalized player in Elitserien history. He received a penalty of five minutes for elbowing and a match penalty after a hit on Luleå HF's Daniel Mannberg to reach a total of 1088 penalty minutes, surpassing Thomas Berglund's 1083.

Like the previous season, an outdoor game was played. It was played between HV71 and Linköpings HC (known as the E4 rivalry) on 10 December 2011, in a temporary arena at Elmia. The outdoor game was played as part of HV71 celebrating its 40th anniversary as a club. For the first time since the start of the yearly tradition of Elitserien outdoor games in 2009, the road team—this year Linköping—came out on top with a 1–0 overtime win in a tight game. 18,884 spectators attended the game, setting a new record for the most spectators at a single sports event in Jönköping; the previous record was 18,582 spectators, set at Stadsparksvallen in 1950.

=== 3D broadcasting ===
Certain chosen games were broadcast in 3D, marking the first time in history that Elitserien was broadcast in 3D. The local derby game on 20 September 2011, between Stockholm rivals Djurgårdens IF and AIK at the Ericsson Globe, was the first game to have a 3D broadcast. In front of a soldout Ericsson Globe, the game ended 4–2 in Djurgården's favour.

=== Pre-game honours ===
As a result of the 2011 Lokomotiv Yaroslavl plane crash, where Swedish former HV71 goaltender Stefan Liv and the entire Lokomotiv Yaroslavl team were killed, the premier round games between 13 and 15 September 2011 began with a one-minute silence. In honour of Stefan Liv, his No. 1 jersey was retired and raised to the rafters by HV71 in Kinnarps Arena prior to HV71's home game against Timrå IK on 10 January 2012.

Djurgårdens IF legend Sven Tumba died on 1 October 2011. As a result, Tumba was honoured in all Elitserien arenas that day. The biggest honours were held in Djurgården's home game against Växjö Lakers at Hovet, which was won by Djurgården 2–1.

On 24 January 2012, former five-time Djurgården Swedish champion Charles Berglund's No. 2 jersey was retired and raised to the rafters in Hovet prior to a game against Färjestad. Djurgården won 2–1 after a shootout.

== Regular season ==
=== Standings ===
2011–12 Elitserien season	GP	W	L	OTW	OTL	GF	GA	GD	Pts
Luleå HF^{y}	55	25	13	8	9	128	104	+24	100
Skellefteå AIK^{x}	55	26	17	5	7	148	125	+23	95
HV71^{x}	55	22	16	9	8	151	130	+21	92
Brynäs IF^{x}	55	25	19	6	5	148	140	+8	92
Frölunda HC^{x}	55	22	17	8	8	140	113	+27	90
Färjestad BK^{x}	55	23	18	4	10	124	124	0	87
AIK^{x}	55	19	19	8	9	146	132	+14	82
Modo Hockey^{x}	55	19	22	8	6	146	147	–1	79
Växjö Lakers HC^{e}	55	18	22	8	7	124	133	–9	77
Linköpings HC^{e}	55	17	24	7	7	120	138	–18	72
Djurgårdens IF^{r}	55	15	23	10	7	123	144	–21	72
Timrå IK^{r}	55	10	31	8	6	115	183	–68	52

x – clinched playoff spot; y – clinched regular season league title; e – eliminated from playoff contention; r – play in relegation series

=== Statistics ===
==== Scoring leaders ====
Updated as of the end of the regular season.
GP = Games played; G = Goals; A = Assists; Pts = Points; +/– = Plus/minus; PIM = Penalty minutes

Player	Team	GP	G	A	Pts	+/–	PIM
(Sweden) Robert Rosén	AIK	55	21	39	60	+22	20
(Sweden) Jakob Silfverberg	Brynäs IF	49	24	30	54	–2	10
(Sweden) Nicklas Danielsson	Modo Hockey	53	21	31	52	+26	77
(Norway) Per-Åge Skrøder	Modo Hockey	53	22	29	51	+21	52
(Canada) Bud Holloway	Skellefteå AIK	55	21	28	49	+11	32
(Sweden) Richard Gynge	AIK	55	28	16	44	+12	18
(United States) Rob Schremp	Modo Hockey	55	19	22	41	+1	48
(Norway) Mathis Olimb	Frölunda HC	55	10	31	41	+23	34
(Sweden) Niklas Olausson	Luleå HF	53	8	33	41	+10	20
(Finland) Mika Pyörälä	Frölunda HC	53	22	18	40	+24	12

==== Leading goaltenders ====
These are the leaders in GAA among goaltenders who have played at least 40% of the team's minutes. Updated as of the end of the regular season.

GP = Games played; TOI = Time on ice (minutes); GA = Goals against; SO = Shutouts; Sv% = Save percentage; GAA = Goals against average

Player	Team	GP	TOI	GA	SO	Sv%	GAA
(Denmark) Frederik Andersen	Frölunda HC	39	2335:11	65	7	.941	1.67
(Sweden) Johan Gustafsson	Luleå HF	29	1753:35	51	6	.930	1.74
(Sweden) Joacim Eriksson	Skellefteå AIK	33	2016:14	61	3	.932	1.82
(Sweden) David Rautio	Luleå HF	27	1602:44	49	4	.925	1.83
(Sweden) Cristopher Nihlstorp	Färjestad BK	45	2590:08	88	5	.923	2.04
(Sweden) Viktor Fasth	AIK	46	2682:50	95	5	.931	2.12
(Switzerland) Martin Gerber	Växjö Lakers HC	42	2417:16	88	4	.928	2.18
(Finland) Fredrik Norrena	Linköpings HC	47	2698:54	104	4	.918	2.31
(Sweden) Gustaf Wesslau	Djurgårdens IF	54	3216:41	126	2	.917	2.35
(Sweden) Johan Holmqvist	Brynäs IF	28	1598:48	63	1	.917	2.36
(Sweden) Daniel Larsson	HV71	36	2107:55	83	1	.915	2.36

==== Attendance ====
#	Club	Home		Away		Total	
#	Club	Total	Average	Total	Average	Total	Average
1	Frölunda HC	293,499	10,482	157,508	5,833	451,007	8,200
2	Djurgårdens IF	208,535	7,723	185,907	6,639	394,442	7,171
3	HV 71	202,498	7,232	169,535	6,279	372,033	6,764
4	Linköpings HC	186,403	6,903	169,578	6,413	365,981	6,654
5	Färjestads BK	184,516	6,589	177,624	6,578	362,140	6,584
6	Brynäs IF	169,167	6,265	185,736	6,633	354,903	6,452
7	MODO Hockey	171,340	6,119	178,091	6,595	349,431	6,353
8	AIK	152,600	5,450	181,699	6,733	334,399	6,079
9	Luleå HF	144,339	5,154	169,428	6,275	313,767	5,704
10	Växjö Lakers HC	137,685	5,099	178,385	6,370	316,070	5,746
11	Skellefteå AIK	137,114	5,078	176,052	6,287	313,166	5,693
12	Timrå IK	122,123	4,523	170,176	6,077	292,299	5,314

== Playoffs ==
=== Playoff bracket ===
In the first round, the top-seeded team chose which of the four lowest remaining seeds to be matched against; the 2nd-seed chose any of the three remaining seeds; the 3rd-seed chose any of the two remaining seeds; and the 4th-seed was automatically matched against the remaining seed. In the second round, the highest remaining seed was matched against the lowest remaining seed, while two remaining seeds matched up against each other. In each round the higher-seeded team was awarded home ice advantage. Each best-of-seven series followed an alternating home team format: the higher-seeded team played at home for games 1 and 3 (plus 5 and 7 if necessary), and the lower-seeded team was at home for games 2 and 4 (plus 6 if necessary).

Quarterfinals
1	Luleå HF	1
7	**AIK**	**4**
2	**Skellefteå AIK**	**4**
8	Modo Hockey	2
(Pairings are reseeded after the first round)
3	HV71	2
6	**Färjestad BK**	**4**
4	**Brynäs IF**	**4**
5	Frölunda HC	2

Semifinals
2	**Skellefteå AIK**	**4**
7	AIK	3
4	**Brynäs IF**	**4**
6	Färjestad BK	1

Finals
2	Skellefteå AIK	2
4	**Brynäs IF**	**4**

=== Quarterfinals ===
==== (1) Luleå HF vs. (7) AIK ====
Luleå entered the playoffs as the regular-season champions for the first time since 1996, with 100 points. AIK finished the regular season as the seventh seed with 82 points. This was the second playoff series between these teams; in 1997, Luleå defeated AIK in three games to advance to the finals. In the regular season, Luleå won four of the five games against AIK, allowing no goals in either of these four games.

March 10	**Luleå HF**	**6–3**	AIK	Coop Norrbotten Arena	Recap
No scoring		**First period**	15:04 - Oscar Ahlström 1
Chris Abbott 1–02:53; Toni Koivisto 1–18:50		**Second period**	13:27 - Patric Blomdahl 1
Sebastian Enterfeldt 1–03:25; Johan Harju 1 - pp - 11:48; Sebastian Meijer 1 - en - 17:35; Simon Hjalmarsson 1 - en - 19:30		**Third period**	17:59 - Oscar Ahlström 2
Johan Gustafsson 25 saves / 28 shots		**Goalie stats**	Viktor Fasth 33 saves / 37 shots

March 12	**AIK**	**4–2**	Luleå HF	Hovet	Recap
No scoring		**First period**	09:00 - pp - Toni Koivisto 2
Christian Sandberg 1 - pp - 01:27; Oscar Ahlström 3–06:17; Daniel Rudslätt 1–12:05		**Second period**	No scoring
Jonas Liwing 1–13:52		**Third period**	19:43 - pp - Sebastian Enterfeldt 2
Viktor Fasth 28 saves / 30 shots		**Goalie stats**	David Rautio 29 saves / 33 shots

March 14	Luleå HF	**2–3**	**AIK**	Coop Norrbotten Arena	Recap
No scoring		**First period**	No scoring
Johan Fransson 1–17:05		**Second period**	10:48 - pp - Stefan Johansson 1; 12:27 - Kent McDonell 1; 13:47 - sh - Daniel Bång 1
Niklas Olausson 1–05:15		**Third period**	No scoring
Johan Gustafsson 22 saves / 25 shots		**Goalie stats**	Viktor Fasth 34 saves / 36 shots

March 16	**AIK**	**4–1**	Luleå HF	Hovet	Recap
Johannes Salmonsson 1–04:29; Josh MacNevin 1–13:20		**First period**	No scoring
Dick Tärnström 1–18:45		**Second period**	11:33 - Joonas Vihko 1
Kent McDonell 2–11:34		**Third period**	No scoring
Viktor Fasth 19 saves / 20 shots		**Goalie stats**	Johan Gustafsson 29 saves / 33 shots

March 18	Luleå HF	**0–3**	**AIK**	Coop Norrbotten Arena	Recap
No scoring		**First period**
		**Second period**	12:49 - Oscar Ahlström 4
		**Third period**	2:20 - pp - Patric Blomdahl 2; 19:53 - en - Christian Sandberg 2
David Rautio 24 saves / 27 shots		**Goalie stats**	Viktor Fasth 31 saves / 31 shots

**AIK won series 4–1**

==== (2) Skellefteå AIK vs. (8) Modo Hockey ====
Skellefteå finished second in the regular season with 95 points. Modo finished eighth and managed to qualify for the playoffs for the first time since 2007. The teams previously met in the 1978 semifinals, where Modo were swept in two games by Skellefteå. Skellefteå won all five games against Modo in the regular season, although each game was decided by only one goal.

March 10	**Skellefteå AIK**	**3–2**	Modo Hockey	Skellefteå Kraft Arena	Recap
Bud Holloway 1 - pp - 14:51		**First period**	No scoring
Jimmie Ericsson 1–12:31; Pierre-Édouard Bellemare 1 - pp - 14:16		**Second period**	09:22 - pp - Dick Axelsson 1
No scoring		**Third period**	13:50 - Dick Axelsson 2
Joacim Eriksson 27 saves / 29 shots		**Goalie stats**	Mikael Tellqvist 36 saves / 39 shots

March 12	Modo Hockey	**0–4**	**Skellefteå AIK**	Fjällräven Center	Recap
No scoring		**First period**	09:54 - Bud Holloway 2
No scoring		**Second period**	02:28 - pp - Christian Söderström 1; 18:21 - Bud Holloway 3
No scoring		**Third period**	17:33 - en - Erik Forssell 1
Mikael Tellqvist 22 saves / 25 shots		**Goalie stats**	Joacim Eriksson 29 saves / 29 shots

March 14	Skellefteå AIK	2–3	**OT**	**Modo Hockey**	Skellefteå Kraft Arena	Recap
No scoring		First period		No scoring
Jimmie Ericsson 2 - pp - 00:31		Second period		No scoring
Oscar Möller 1 - pp - 17:42		Third period		06:18 - Per-Åge Skrøder 1; 13:31 - Mattias Ritola 1
No scoring		First overtime period		04:03 - ps - Rob Schremp 1
Joacim Eriksson 22 saves / 25 shots		Goalie stats		Mikael Tellqvist 38 saves / 40 shots

March 16	**Modo Hockey**	1–0	**OT**	Skellefteå AIK	Fjällräven Center	Recap
No scoring		First period		No scoring
No scoring		Second period		No scoring
No scoring		Third period		No scoring
Nicklas Danielsson 1–02:40		First overtime period		No scoring
Mikael Tellqvist 44 saves / 44 shots		Goalie stats		Joacim Eriksson 36 saves / 37 shots

March 18	**Skellefteå AIK**	**2–1**	Modo Hockey	Skellefteå Kraft Arena	Recap
No scoring		**First period**	09:32 - pp - Niklas Sundström 1
		**Second period**
Petter Granberg 1–5:24; Jimmie Ericsson 3–56:56		**Third period**
Joacim Eriksson 26 saves / 27 shots		**Goalie stats**	Mikael Tellqvist 38 saves / 40 shots

March 20	Modo Hockey	**1–2**	**Skellefteå AIK**	Fjällräven Center	Recap
		**First period**	00:54 - Bud Holloway 4; 07:45 - Joakim Lindström 1
		**Second period**
Nicklas Danielsson 2–13:45		**Third period**
Mikael Tellqvist 31 saves / 33 shots		**Goalie stats**	Joacim Eriksson 33 saves / 34 shots

**Skellefteå AIK won series 4–2**

==== (3) HV71 vs. (6) Färjestad BK ====
HV71 finished third with 92 points and failed to make the top two spots for the first time since 2009. Färjestad finished sixth with 87 points, marking the team's worst regular season since 2000. The teams had previously faced each other six times; HV71 had only come out on top once. The most recent meeting was in the 2009 finals, when Färjestad won in five games to become the Swedish Champions.

March 11	HV71	**1–4**	**Färjestad BK**	Kinnarps Arena	Recap
No scoring		**First period**	17:43 - Rickard Wallin 1
No scoring		**Second period**	01:01 - Magnus Nygren 1; 08:43 - Per Åslund 1
Mattias Karlsson 1–17:49		**Third period**	16:12 - en - Rickard Wallin 2
Andreas Andersson 22 saves / 25 shots		**Goalie stats**	Cristopher Nihlstorp 24 saves / 25 shots

March 13	**Färjestad BK**	**3–1**	HV71	Löfbergs Lila Arena	Recap
Jonas Brodin 1 - pp - 09:45		**First period**	No scoring
No scoring		**Second period**	01:51 - pp - Jukka Voutilainen 1
Per Åslund 2–08:24; Christian Berglund 1 - en - 18:18		**Third period**	No scoring
Cristopher Nihlstorp 24 saves / 25 shots		**Goalie stats**	Andreas Andersson 32 saves / 34 shots

March 15	**HV71**	4–3	**OT**	Färjestad BK	Kinnarps Arena	Recap
No scoring		First period		02:55 - Anton Grundel 1; 16:56 - Mattias Sjögren 1
Johan Davidsson 1–10:34; Jesse Joensuu 1–14:00		Second period		No scoring
Per Ledin 1–11:39		Third period		17:12 - Mattias Sjögren 2
Jesse Joensuu 2–17:07		First overtime period		No scoring
Andreas Andersson 5 saves / 7 shots Daniel Larsson 18 saves / 19 shots		Goalie stats		Cristopher Nihlstorp 31 saves / 34 shots Fredrik Pettersson-Wentzel 10 saves / 11 shots

March 17	Färjestad BK	**3–5**	**HV71**	Löfbergs Lila Arena	Recap
No scoring		**First period**	08:20 - Jesper Fasth 1
Rickard Wallin 3–01:01		**Second period**	No scoring
Hannes Hyvönen 1–04:46; Kristofer Berglund 1–05:06		**Third period**	04:01 - Mattias Karlsson 2; 07:46 - Jesper Fasth 2; 11:01 - pp - David Petrasek 1; 11:50 - Jason Krog 1
Fredrik Pettersson-Wentzel 18 saves / 23 shots		**Goalie stats**	Daniel Larsson 36 saves / 39 shots

March 19	HV71	**3–5**	**Färjestad BK**	Kinnarps Arena	Recap
Kamil Piros 1–07:31		**First period**
Daniel Grillfors 1–02:33		**Second period**	07:54 - Patrik Lundh 1; 15:24 - Marius Holtet 1
Noah Welch 1–19:57		**Third period**	01:44 - pp - Hannes Hyvönen 2; 10:46 - pp - Magnus Nygren 2; 18:59 - en - Marius Holtet 2
Daniel Larsson 19 saves / 24 shots		**Goalie stats**	Cristopher Nihlstorp 32 saves / 35 shots

March 21	**Färjestad BK**	**2–0**	HV71	Löfbergs Lila Arena	Recap
Marcus Paulsson 1 - pp - 11:54		**First period**	No scoring
		**Second period**
Anders Bastiansen 1 - en - 19:49		**Third period**
Cristopher Nihlstorp 30 saves / 30 shots		**Goalie stats**	Daniel Larsson 23 saves / 25 shots

**Färjestad BK won series 4–2**

==== (4) Brynäs IF vs. (5) Frölunda HC ====
Brynäs' fourth-place finish in the regular season was the team's best since 2001. Frölunda finished fifth and made their best regular season since 2009. This was the fifth playoff series between the teams; the two most recent ones had been won by Frölunda. The previous meeting occurred in 2006, when Frölunda swept Brynäs in four games to advance to the semifinals.

March 11	**Brynäs IF**	**3–1**	Frölunda HC	Läkerol Arena	Recap
No scoring		**First period**	No scoring
Daniel Widing 1 - pp - 15:57; Jonathan Granström 1–18:24		**Second period**	19:27 - Jari Tolsa 1
Calle Järnkrok 1 - en - 19:33		**Third period**	No scoring
Johan Holmqvist 31 saves / 32 shots		**Goalie stats**	Frederik Andersen 25 saves / 27 shots

March 13	**Frölunda HC**	**2–1**	Brynäs IF	Scandinavium	Recap
Fredrik Eriksson 1–15:42		**First period**	06:06 - Jesper Ollas 1
Mathis Olimb 1 - pp - 14:46		**Second period**	No scoring
No scoring		**Third period**	No scoring
Frederik Andersen 19 saves / 20 shots		**Goalie stats**	Johan Holmqvist 31 saves / 33 shots

March 15	**Brynäs IF**	4–3	**OT**	Frölunda HC	Läkerol Arena	Recap
Jakob Silfverberg 1–16:45		First period		No scoring
Jakob Silfverberg 2 - pp - 11:01		Second period		03:07 - Magnus Kahnberg 1; 17:25 - pp - Fredrik Pettersson 1
Calle Järnkrok 2–11:51		Third period		05:52 - Mats Rosseli Olsen 1
Ryan Gunderson 1 - pp - 14:37		First overtime period		No scoring
Johan Holmqvist 26 saves / 29 shots		Goalie stats		Frederik Andersen 35 saves / 39 shots

March 17	Frölunda HC	**0–5**	**Brynäs IF**	Scandinavium	Recap
No scoring		**First period**	17:25 - Jesper Ollas 2
No scoring		**Second period**	01:27 - Jakob Silfverberg 3; 06:28 - pp - Mads Hansen 1; 08:03 - Simon Löf 1
No scoring		**Third period**	01:08 - Sebastian Wännström 1
Frederik Andersen 37 saves / 42 shots		**Goalie stats**	Niklas Svedberg 32 saves / 32 shots

March 19	Brynäs IF	**1–2**	**Frölunda HC**	Läkerol Arena	Recap
No scoring		**First period**	08:42 - Henrik Tömmernes 1
		**Second period**	00:17 - pp - Mika Pyörälä 1
Niclas Andersén 1–09:43		**Third period**
Niklas Svedberg 34 saves / 36 shots		**Goalie stats**	Frederik Andersen 36 saves / 37 shots

March 21	Frölunda HC	3–4	**OT**	**Brynäs IF**	Scandinavium	Recap
Pierre Johnsson 1–07:38		First period		11:12 - Jakob Silfverberg 4
Magnus Kahnberg 2–03:16; Anton Axelsson 1–17:28		Second period
		Third period		05:29 - Daniel Widing 2; 19:33 - Jonathan Granström 2
No scoring		First overtime period		04:23 - Jakob Silfverberg 5
Frederik Andersen 22 saves / 26 shots		Goalie stats		Niklas Svedberg 20 saves / 23 shots

**Brynäs IF won series 4–2**

=== Semifinals ===
All times are local (UTC+2).

==== (2) Skellefteå AIK vs. (7) AIK ====
Skellefteå won four of the five regular-season meetings against AIK, only one of which was decided by more than one goal. In the playoffs, the teams had previously faced each other in the 1978 finals; Skellefteå came out on top and clinched the championship in three games that time.

March 26	Skellefteå AIK	**1–4**	**AIK**	Skellefteå Kraft Arena	Recap
No scoring		**First period**	No scoring
No scoring		**Second period**	No scoring
Bud Holloway 5 - pp - 10:41		**Third period**	02:23 - Josh MacNevin 2; 13:11 - Daniel Bång 2; 16:10 - Kent McDonell 3; 19:21 - en - Tobias Viklund 1
Joacim Eriksson 34 saves / 37 shots		**Goalie stats**	Viktor Fasth 39 saves / 40 shots

March 28	AIK	4–5	**3OT**	**Skellefteå AIK**	Hovet	Recap
Richard Gynge 1–01:30; Johannes Salmonsson 2–06:08		First period		19:32 - Joakim Lindström 2
Christian Sandberg 3 - pp - 13:01		Second period		05:25 - Oscar Möller 2; 12:23 - ps - Oscar Möller 3
Stefan Johansson 2 - pp - 09:17		Third period		12:33 - Jimmie Ericsson 4
No scoring		Third overtime period		10:49 - pp - Jimmie Ericsson 5
Viktor Fasth 59 saves / 64 shots		Goalie stats		Joacim Eriksson 43 saves / 47 shots

March 30	**Skellefteå AIK**	**5–1**	AIK	Skellefteå Kraft Arena	Recap
No scoring		**First period**	No scoring
Melker Karlsson 1–11:38; Oscar Möller 4 - ps - 19:31		**Second period**	No scoring
Lee Goren 1 - pp - 03:08; Lee Goren 2 - pp - 06:07; Lee Goren 3 - en - 17:47		**Third period**	09:58 - sh - Joakim Nordström 1
Joacim Eriksson 24 saves / 25 shots		**Goalie stats**	Viktor Fasth 35 saves / 39 shots Markus Svensson 8 saves / 8 shots

April 1	**AIK**	**5–3**	Skellefteå AIK	Hovet	Recap
Dick Tärnström 2 - pp - 04:28; Johannes Salmonsson 3–05:00		**First period**	07:12 - pp - Oscar Möller 5
Kent McDonell 4–05:17		**Second period**	06:50 - Pierre-Édouard Bellemare 2; 11:49 - Bud Holloway 6
Robert Rosén 1 - pp - 15:28; Daniel Rudslätt 2 - pp - 18:44		**Third period**	No scoring
Viktor Fasth 23 saves / 26 shots		**Goalie stats**	Joacim Eriksson 30 saves / 35 shots

April 3	**Skellefteå AIK**	**8–2**	AIK	Skellefteå Kraft Arena	Recap
Lee Goren 4–03:36; Joakim Lindström 3–06:29; Jimmie Ericsson 6 - pp - 11:28; Bud Holloway 7–18:01		**First period**	No scoring
Erik Forssell 2 - pp - 13:03		**Second period**	02:59 - sh - Christian Sandberg 4; 18:04 - Kent McDonell 5
Anders Söderberg 1–04:48; Christian Söderström 2 - pp - 13:10; Melker Karlsson 2–13:44		**Third period**	No scoring
Joacim Eriksson 17 saves / 19 shots		**Goalie stats**	Viktor Fasth 42 saves / 50 shots

April 5	**AIK**	**2–1**	Skellefteå AIK	Hovet	Recap
No scoring		**First period**	No scoring
Robert Rosén 2 - pp - 13:04		**Second period**	No scoring
Robert Rosén 3–03:21		**Third period**	06:23 - pp - Bud Holloway 8
Viktor Fasth 39 saves / 40 shots		**Goalie stats**	Joacim Eriksson 22 saves / 24 shots

April 7	**Skellefteå AIK**	**5–3**	AIK	Skellefteå Kraft Arena	Recap
Jimmie Ericsson 7 - pp - 10:56; Johan Forsberg 1–14:21		**First period**	19:14 - Kent McDonell 6
Oscar Möller 6 - pp - 05:32		**Second period**	No scoring
Christian Söderström 3 - pp - 01:35; Lee Goren 5 - en - 16:48		**Third period**	09:11 - pp - Tobias Viklund 2; 19:43 - sh - Daniel Bång 3
Joacim Eriksson 21 saves / 24 shots		**Goalie stats**	Viktor Fasth 26 saves / 30 shots

**Skellefteå AIK won series 4–3**

==== (4) Brynäs IF vs. (6) Färjestad BK ====
Brynäs won three of the five regular-season games against Färjestad. The teams had previously met each other in the playoffs eight times; Färjestad had come out on top in the six latest occasions. The most recent meeting occurred in 2011, when Färjestad knocked Brynäs out in the quarterfinals, winning in five games.

March 26	Brynäs IF	2–3	**2OT**	**Färjestad BK**	Läkerol Arena	Recap
Mattias Ekholm 1–06:34		First period		12:16 - Stefan Meyer 1
No scoring		Second period		09:57 - Stefan Meyer 2
Daniel Widing 3–10:10		Third period		No scoring
No scoring		Second overtime period		03:23 - Patrik Lundh 2
Niklas Svedberg 37 saves / 40 shots		Goalie stats		Cristopher Nihlstorp 21 saves / 22 shots Fredrik Pettersson-Wentzel 24 saves / 25 shots

March 28	Färjestad BK	**2–4**	**Brynäs IF**	Löfbergs Lila Arena	Recap
No scoring		**First period**	No scoring
No scoring		**Second period**	04:30 - pp - Calle Järnkrok 3; 12:57 - Mats Lavander 1
Rickard Wallin 4–00:20; Christian Berglund 2–11:07		**Third period**	06:32 - Jonathan Granström 3; 18:30 - en - Jakob Silfverberg 6
Fredrik Pettersson-Wentzel 32 saves / 35 shots		**Goalie stats**	Niklas Svedberg 29 saves / 31 shots

March 30	**Brynäs IF**	**4–2**	Färjestad BK	Läkerol Arena	Recap
Johan Larsson 1–09:30		**First period**	No scoring
Martin Johansson 1–12:25		**Second period**	09:28 - Rickard Wallin 5; 16:43 - Christian Berglund 3
Jonas Nordquist 1–09:26; Jakob Silfverberg 7 - en - 19:31		**Third period**	No scoring
Niklas Svedberg 29 saves / 31 shots		**Goalie stats**	Fredrik Pettersson-Wentzel 25 saves / 28 shots

April 1	Färjestad BK	**0–3**	**Brynäs IF**	Löfbergs Lila Arena	Recap
No scoring		**First period**	No scoring
No scoring		**Second period**	11:44 - Joachim Rohdin 1
No scoring		**Third period**	12:36 - Mads Hansen 2; 17:03 - en - Jesper Ollas 3
Fredrik Pettersson-Wentzel 24 saves / 26 shots		**Goalie stats**	Niklas Svedberg 26 saves / 26 shots

April 3	**Brynäs IF**	**4–2**	Färjestad BK	Läkerol Arena	Recap
Mats Lavander 2–02:32		**First period**	19:29 - Marius Holtet 3
Sebastian Wännström 2–01:27; Calle Järnkrok 4–08:02		**Second period**	00:57 - Jonas Brodin 2
Jonathan Granström 4 - en - 19:18		**Third period**	No scoring
Niklas Svedberg 42 saves / 44 shots		**Goalie stats**	Cristopher Nihlstorp 19 saves / 22 shots

**Brynäs IF won series 4–1**

=== Finals ===
==== (2) Skellefteå AIK vs. (4) Brynäs IF ====
Brynäs won three of the five regular-season games between the two teams. This was only the second playoff series between these teams. The first playoff meeting took place in the 1976 semifinals, when Brynäs defeated Skellefteå two games to zero and advanced to the finals.

April 10	Skellefteå AIK	**3–6**	**Brynäs IF**	Skellefteå Kraft Arena	Recap
No scoring		**First period**	07:03 - Jesper Ollas 4; 14:11 - Jakob Silfverberg 8
Pierre-Édouard Bellemare 3 - pp - 09:19		**Second period**	07:01 - Joachim Rohdin 2; 10:54 - pp - Martin Johansson 2
Joakim Lindström 4 - pp - 05:45; Bud Holloway 9 - pp - 19:58		**Third period**	01:42 - Joachim Rohdin 3; 18:04 - en - Jakob Silfverberg 9
Joacim Eriksson 22 saves / 27 shots		**Goalie stats**	Niklas Svedberg 43 saves / 46 shots

April 12	**Brynäs IF**	3–2	**OT**	Skellefteå AIK	Läkerol Arena	Recap
Jörgen Sundqvist 1–13:53		First period		No scoring
No scoring		Second period		16:16 - Niclas Burström 1
Daniel Widing 4–02:26		Third period		18:51 - Pierre-Édouard Bellemare 4
Martin Johansson 3–02:03		First overtime period		No scoring
Niklas Svedberg 22 saves / 24 shots		Goalie stats		Joacim Eriksson 19 saves / 22 shots

April 14	Skellefteå AIK	**0–1**	**Brynäs IF**	Skellefteå Kraft Arena	Recap
No scoring		**First period**	No scoring
No scoring		**Second period**	14:23 - Jonathan Granström 5
No scoring		**Third period**	No scoring
Joacim Eriksson 17 saves / 18 shots		**Goalie stats**	Niklas Svedberg 38 saves / 38 shots

April 15	Brynäs IF	3–4	**OT**	**Skellefteå AIK**	Läkerol Arena	Recap
Jakob Silfverberg 10 - pp - 03:08; Jakob Silfverberg 11 - pp - 17:41		First period		14:08 - Erik Forssell 3
No scoring		Second period		07:23 - Anders Söderberg 2; 19:27 - pp - Joakim Lindström 5
Ryan Gunderson 2–05:25		Third period		No scoring
No scoring		First overtime period		06:35 - pp - Oscar Lindberg 1
Niklas Svedberg 32 saves / 36 shots		Goalie stats		Joacim Eriksson 24 saves / 27 shots

April 17	**Skellefteå AIK**	**3–2**	Brynäs IF	Skellefteå Kraft Arena	Recap
Bud Holloway 10 - pp - 11:56		**First period**	No scoring
Tomas Skogs 1–18:42		**Second period**	06:21 - Johan Larsson 2; 09:04 - Jakob Silfverberg 12
Oscar Möller 7–13:33		**Third period**	No scoring
Joacim Eriksson 20 saves / 22 shots		**Goalie stats**	Johan Holmqvist 34 saves / 37 shots

April 19	**Brynäs IF**	**2–0**	Skellefteå AIK	Läkerol Arena	Recap
No scoring		**First period**	No scoring
Jakob Silfverberg 13–13:50		**Second period**	No scoring
Ryan Gunderson 3–12:09		**Third period**	No scoring
Niklas Svedberg 29 saves / 29 shots		**Goalie stats**	Joacim Eriksson 26 saves / 28 shots

**Brynäs IF won series 4–2**

=== Playoff statistics ===
==== Playoff scoring leaders ====
Updated as of 19 April 2012.
GP = Games played; G = Goals; A = Assists; Pts = Points; +/– = Plus/minus; PIM = Penalty minutes

Player	Team	GP	G	A	Pts	+/–	PIM
(Canada) Bud Holloway	Skellefteå AIK	19	10	13	23	+4	4
(Sweden) Jakob Silfverberg	Brynäs IF	17	13	7	20	+17	4
(Sweden) Joakim Lindström	Skellefteå AIK	19	5	12	17	+1	22
(Sweden) Jimmie Ericsson	Skellefteå AIK	19	7	9	16	–1	38
(Sweden) Calle Järnkrok	Brynäs IF	16	4	12	16	+12	12
(Sweden) Oscar Möller	Skellefteå AIK	19	7	8	15	+4	8
(Canada) Lee Goren	Skellefteå AIK	14	5	8	13	0	22
(Canada) Kent McDonell	AIK	12	6	6	12	+9	18
(France) Pierre-Édouard Bellemare	Skellefteå AIK	15	4	8	12	+6	12
(Sweden) Jonathan Granström	Brynäs IF	17	5	5	10	+10	30

==== Playoff leading goaltenders ====
These are the leaders in GAA and save percentage among goaltenders who played at least 40% of the team's minutes. The table is sorted by GAA, and the criteria for inclusion are bolded. Updated as of the end of the season.

GP = Games played; TOI = Time on ice (minutes); GA = Goals against; SO = Shutouts; Sv% = Save percentage; GAA = Goals against average

Player	Team	GP	TOI	GA	SO	Sv%	GAA
(Sweden) Niklas Svedberg	Brynäs IF	13	813:36	23	4	**.947**	**1.70**
(Sweden) Cristopher Nihlstorp	Färjestad BK	7	399:51	12	1	**.938**	**1.80**
(Sweden) Mikael Tellqvist	Modo Hockey	6	360:59	12	1	**.946**	**1.99**
(Sweden) Joacim Eriksson	Skellefteå AIK	19	1199:52	44	1	**.918**	**2.20**
(Sweden) Daniel Larsson	HV71	4	233:38	9	0	.914	**2.31**
(Sweden) Viktor Fasth	AIK	12	752:27	35	1	**.921**	2.79

== Elitserien awards ==
Guldhjälmen: Jakob Silfverberg, Brynäs IF
Guldpucken: Jakob Silfverberg, Brynäs IF
Honken Trophy: Viktor Fasth, AIK
Håkan Loob Trophy: Richard Gynge, AIK
Rookie of the Year: Johan Larsson, Brynäs IF
Salming Trophy: Mattias Ekholm, Brynäs IF
Playoff MVP (later renamed the Stefan Liv Memorial Trophy): Jakob Silfverberg, Brynäs IF
Guldpipan: Ulf Rönnmark
