= Jörgen Sundqvist =

Jörgen Sundqvist may refer to:

- Jörgen Sundqvist (ice hockey) (born 1982), Swedish ice hockey defenceman
- Jörgen Sundqvist (alpine skier) (born 1962), Swedish former alpine skier
