= Daniel Rudslätt =

Swedish ice hockey player

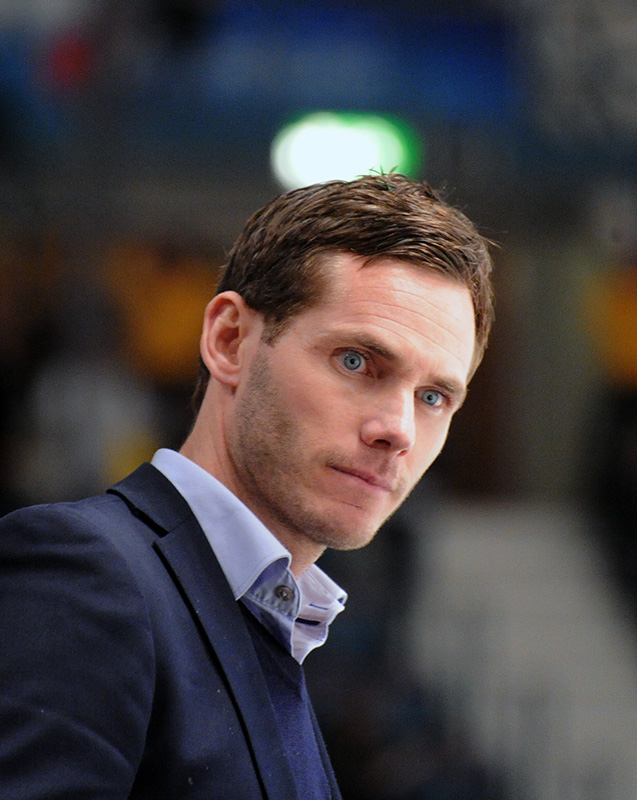
- Born: September 8, 1974 (age 52) Huddinge
- Height: 6 ft 0 in (183 cm)
- Weight: 187 lb (85 kg; 13 st 5 lb)
- Position: Left wing
- Shot: Left
- Played for: Elitserien; Brynäs IF; Djurgårdens IF Hockey; AIK; Deutsche Eishockey Liga (DEL); Kölner Haie
- National team: Sweden
- Playing career: 1998–2012

Daniel Rudslätt (born September 8, 1974 in Huddinge) is a retired Swedish professional ice hockey player. Rudslätt was acquired by AIK in 2010 and signed to a two-year contract with AIK, which expired after the 2011–12 Elitserien season. Rudslätt has also played in Brynäs IF and Djurgårdens IF Hockey and won the Elitserien playoffs with both teams. Rudslätt's youth team is Kallhälls IF.

== Career statistics ==
			Regular season					Playoffs
Season	Team	League	GP	G	A	Pts	PIM	GP	G	A	Pts	PIM
1991–92	Järfälla HC	Division 2	20	8	7	15	38	—	—	—	—	—
1992–93	Järfälla HC	Division 2	32	16	13	29	14	—	—	—	—	—
1993–94	Järfälla HC	Division 2	32	24	20	44	12	—	—	—	—	—
1994–95	Järfälla HC	Division 2	17	18	12	30	14	—	—	—	—	—
1995–96	Arlanda HC	Division 1	28	17	11	28	28	4	2	4	6	0
1996–97	Arlanda HC	Division 1	26	15	11	26	16	—	—	—	—	—
1997–98	Arlanda HC	Division 1	32	21	20	41	34	2	2	1	3	0
1998–99	Brynäs IF	Elitserien	49	9	4	13	24	14	4	2	6	8
1999–00	Brynäs IF	Elitserien	44	13	12	25	24	7	2	3	5	8
2000–01	Brynäs IF	Elitserien	48	17	21	38	46	2	0	0	0	0
2001–02	Brynäs IF	Elitserien	45	15	17	32	16	4	1	2	3	12
2002–03	Djurgårdens IF Hockey	Elitserien	48	10	11	21	58	12	3	1	4	6
2003–04	Djurgårdens IF Hockey	Elitserien	48	14	11	25	30	4	1	0	1	6
2004–05	Djurgårdens IF Hockey	Elitserien	50	10	8	18	50	5	3	0	3	4
2005–06	Djurgårdens IF Hockey	Elitserien	47	14	22	36	20	—	—	—	—	—
2006–07	Kölner Haie	DEL	36	14	21	35	36	9	4	6	10	4
2007–08	Kölner Haie	DEL	52	10	18	28	86	14	0	7	7	10
2008–09	Kölner Haie	DEL	49	18	28	46	34	—	—	—	—	—
2009–10	Kölner Haie	DEL	47	13	19	32	28	3	1	0	1	2
2010–11	AIK IF	Elitserien	52	8	13	21	34	8	2	1	3	0
2011–12	AIK IF	Elitserien	50	3	10	13	18	11	2	2	4	4
Elitserien totals			481	113	129	242	320	67	18	11	29	48
DEL totals			184	55	86	141	184	26	5	13	18	16
