= Daniel Bång =

Swedish ice hockey player

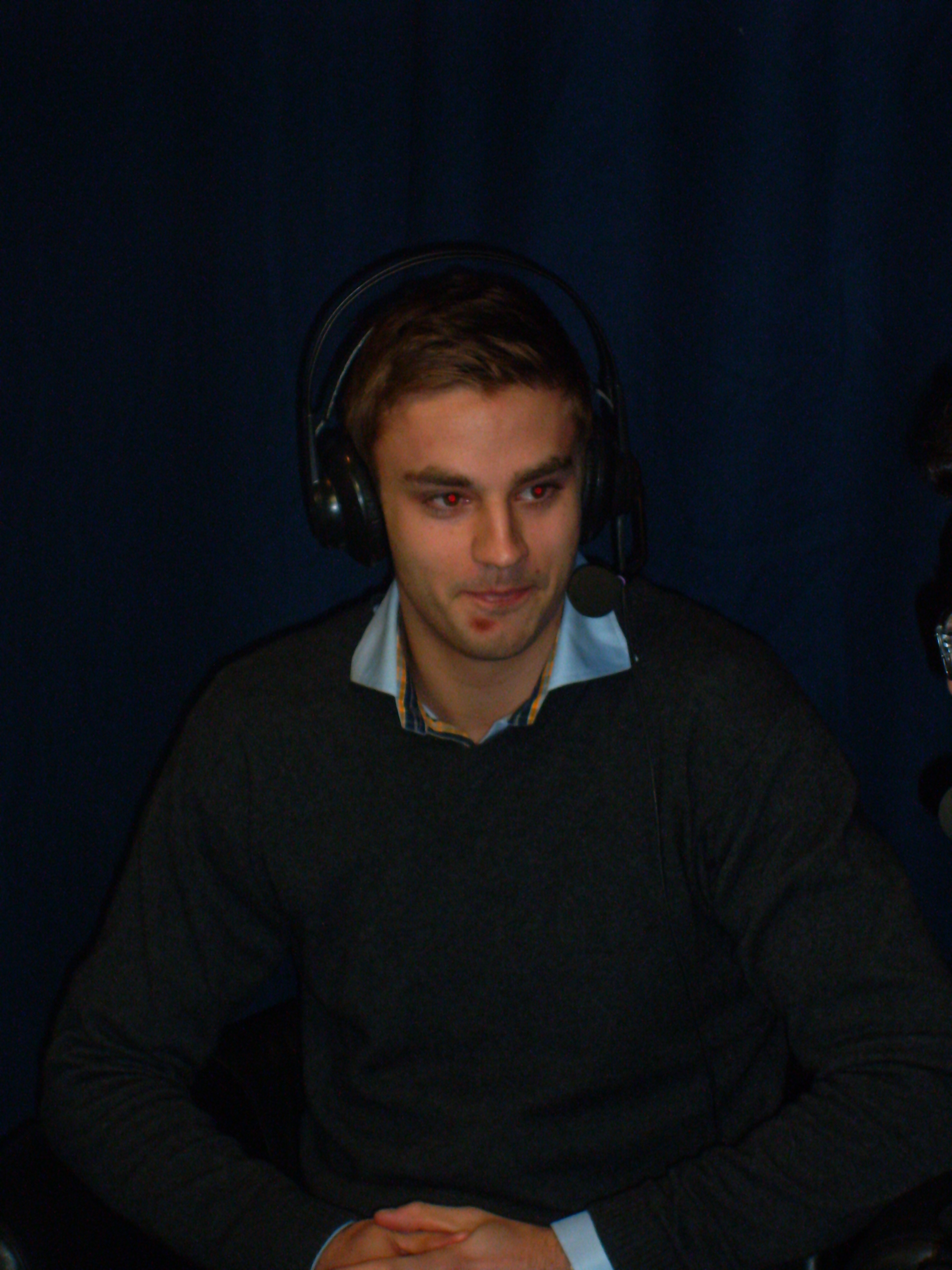
- Daniel Bång
- Born: 19 April 1987 (age 39) Kista, Sweden
- Height: 6 ft 3 in (191 cm)
- Weight: 201 lb (91 kg; 14 st 5 lb)
- Position: Right wing
- Shot: Left
- Played for: AIK IF; Milwaukee Admirals; Nashville Predators; Lausanne Hockey Club
- National team: Sweden
- NHL draft: Undrafted
- Playing career: 2006–2016

Daniel Niklas Bång (born 19 April 1987) is a Swedish former professional ice hockey Right wing. He played 8 NHL games with the Nashville Predators but spend most of the 2012/13 season with their American Hockey League (AHL) affiliate the Milwaukee Admirals. He played as a youth with Kista HC and AIK.

Bång has previously played for AIK of the Swedish top-tier league Elitserien (SEL). He signed a one-year, two-way contract with the Nashville Predators of the National Hockey League (NHL) worth $0.7 million USD on 1 June 2012.

After signing a 1-year contract with Lausanne HC of the Swiss National League A (NLA) he signed a 2-year extension in January 2014. He was part of the LHC team who qualified for the playoffs for the first time in the club's history on 4 March 2014. They went on to push the top seed ZSC Lions to a seventh game that they lost 1–0 in Zurich.

== Career statistics ==
=== Regular season and playoffs ===
			Regular season					Playoffs
Season	Team	League	GP	G	A	Pts	PIM	GP	G	A	Pts	PIM
2004–05	AIK IF	J20	22	0	4	4	12	—	—	—	—	—
2005–06	AIK IF	J20	26	1	3	4	78	—	—	—	—	—
2005–06	AIK IF	SWE-2	1	0	0	0	0	—	—	—	—	—
2006–07	AIK IF	J20	6	2	0	2	22	—	—	—	—	—
2006–07	AIK IF	SWE-2	44	6	11	17	50	—	—	—	—	—
2007–08	AIK IF	J20	2	0	2	2	31	—	—	—	—	—
2007–08	AIK IF	SWE-2	37	7	7	14	26	—	—	—	—	—
2008–09	AIK IF	SWE-2	38	20	9	29	65	9	3	0	3	27
2009–10	AIK IF	SWE-2	48	14	17	31	86	10	5	1	6	6
2010–11	AIK IF	SEL	40	5	7	12	82	6	2	2	4	0
2011–12	AIK IF	SEL	50	8	10	18	30	12	3	3	6	0
2012–13	Milwaukee Admirals	AHL	53	9	13	22	21	3	0	0	0	0
2012–13	Nashville Predators	NHL	8	0	2	2	0	—	—	—	—	—
2013–14	Lausanne HC	NLA	47	15	13	28	39	7	4	2	6	0
2014–15	Lausanne HC	NLA	30	6	5	11	18	—	—	—	—	—
SEL totals			90	13	17	30	112	18	5	5	10	0
NHL totals			8	0	2	2	0	—	—	—	—	—
