= Stefan Johansson (disambiguation) =

Stefan Johansson (born 1956) is a Swedish racing driver.

Stefan Johansson may also refer to:

- Stefan Johansson (racewalker) (born 1967), Swedish race walker
- Stefan Johansson (ice hockey) (born 1988), Swedish ice hockey player
- Stefan Johansen (born 1991), Norwegian footballer
- Stefan Johannesson (born 1971), Swedish football referee
