= Simon Löf =

Swedish ice hockey player

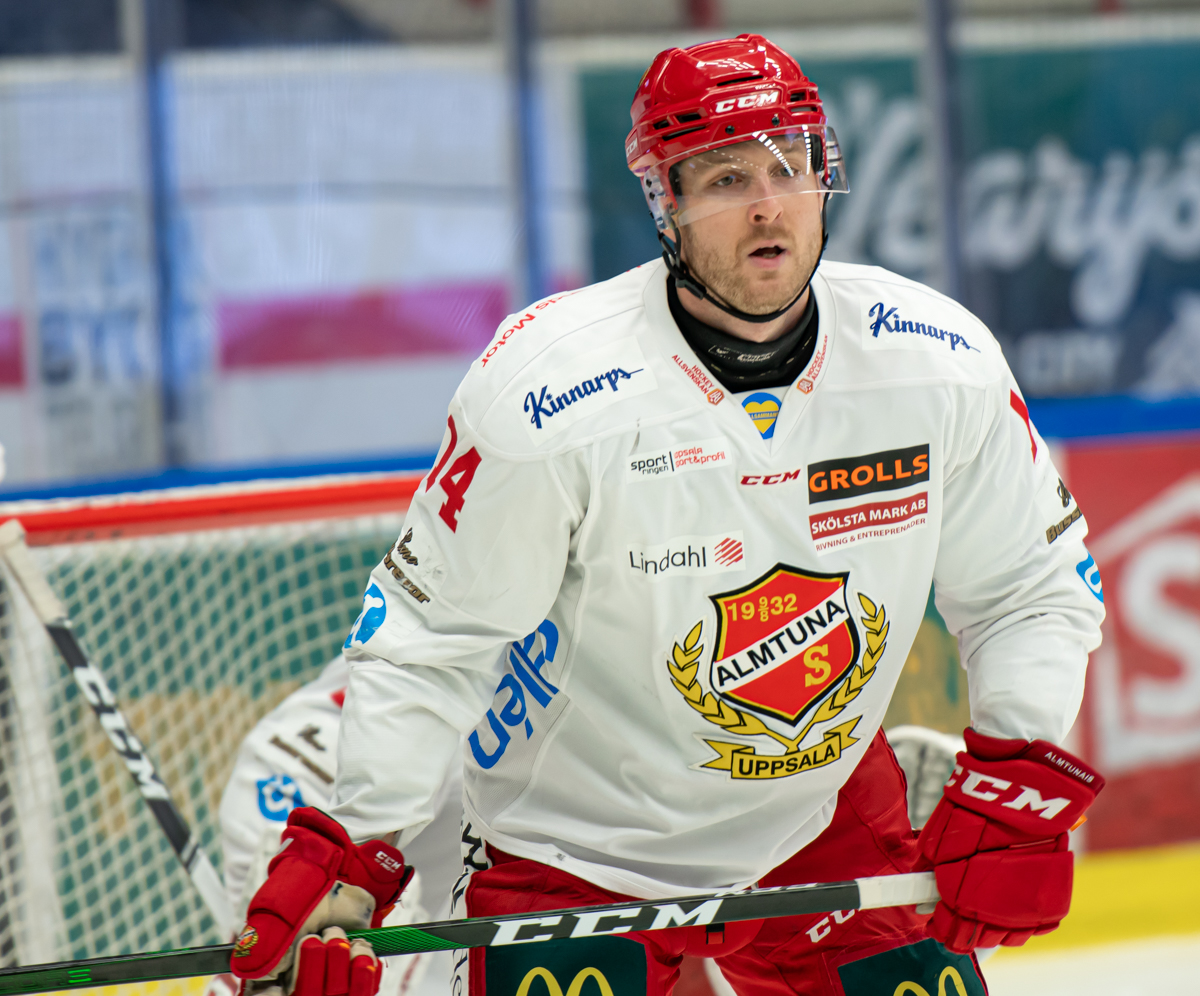
- Born: May 29, 1996 (age 29) Gävle, Sweden
- Height: 6 ft 2 in (188 cm)
- Weight: 183 lb (83 kg; 13 st 1 lb)
- Position: Defence
- Shot: Right
- Played for: Brynäs IF; Mora IK; Almtuna IS; Södertälje SK; HC Vita Hästen; Sterzing Broncos; Sparta Warriors; Rungsted Seier Capital; Hudiksvall
- NHL draft: Undrafted
- Playing career: 2009–2022

Simon Löf (born May 29, 1996) is a Swedish professional ice hockey defenceman who currently plays for Hudiksvall of the Swedish Hockeyettan.

== Career statistics ==
			Regular season					Playoffs
Season	Team	League	GP	G	A	Pts	PIM	GP	G	A	Pts	PIM
2006–07	Brynäs IF J18	J18 Allsvenskan	12	0	1	1	2	1	0	0	0	0
2007–08	Brynäs IF J18	J18 Allsvenskan	11	2	6	8	6	5	0	1	1	2
2007–08	Brynäs IF J20	J20 SuperElit	18	0	3	3	2	—	—	—	—	—
2008–09	Brynäs IF J18	J18 Elit	4	1	2	3	4	—	—	—	—	—
2008–09	Brynäs IF J18	J18 Allsvenskan	1	0	0	0	0	2	2	1	3	12
2008–09	Brynäs IF J20	J20 SuperElit	34	3	6	9	16	7	3	0	3	6
2008–09	Brynäs IF	Elitserien	1	0	0	0	0	—	—	—	—	—
2009–10	Brynäs IF J20	J20 SuperElit	4	0	4	4	4	4	2	0	2	4
2009–10	Brynäs IF	Elitserien	55	0	3	3	10	5	0	0	0	0
2010–11	Brynäs IF J20	J20 SuperElit	3	0	0	0	0	—	—	—	—	—
2010–11	Brynäs IF	Elitserien	15	1	1	2	4	—	—	—	—	—
2010–11	Mora IK	HockeyAllsvenskan	36	1	7	8	26	10	0	0	0	8
2011–12	Brynäs IF J20	J20 SuperElit	4	0	0	0	2	—	—	—	—	—
2011–12	Brynäs IF	Elitserien	39	2	0	2	14	15	1	1	2	2
2012–13	Brynäs IF	Elitserien	48	1	3	4	22	1	0	0	0	0
2013–14	Brynäs IF	SHL	27	0	2	2	6	5	0	0	0	6
2013–14	Almtuna IS	HockeyAllsvenskan	11	0	5	5	12	—	—	—	—	—
2014–15	Södertälje SK	HockeyAllsvenskan	49	1	5	6	28	—	—	—	—	—
2015–16	HC Vita Hästen	HockeyAllsvenskan	38	1	2	3	22	—	—	—	—	—
2016–17	Wipptal Broncos	AlpsHL	12	1	2	3	6	—	—	—	—	—
2016–17	Sparta Sarpsborg	Norway	10	0	3	3	2	—	—	—	—	—
2016–17	Rungsted Seier Capital	Denmark	22	5	1	6	4	4	0	1	1	0
2017–18	Hudiksvalls HC	Hockeyettan	38	1	14	15	18	2	0	0	0	2
2018–19	Hudiksvalls HC	Hockeyettan	39	8	7	15	24	16	4	2	6	6
2019–20	Hudiksvalls HC	Hockeyettan	40	3	16	19	18	3	0	0	0	0
2020–21	Almtuna IS	HockeyAllsvenskan	51	2	5	7	22	2	0	0	0	0
2021–22	Almtuna IS	HockeyAllsvenskan	51	2	5	7	26	—	—	—	—	—
SHL (Elitserien) totals			185	4	9	13	56	26	1	1	2	8
Norway totals			10	0	3	3	2	—	—	—	—	—
Denmark totals			22	5	1	6	4	4	0	1	1	0
HockeyAllsvenskan totals			236	7	29	36	136	12	0	0	0	8
Hockeyettan totals			117	12	37	49	60	21	4	2	6	8
