= Kent McDonell =

Canadian ice hockey player (born 1979)

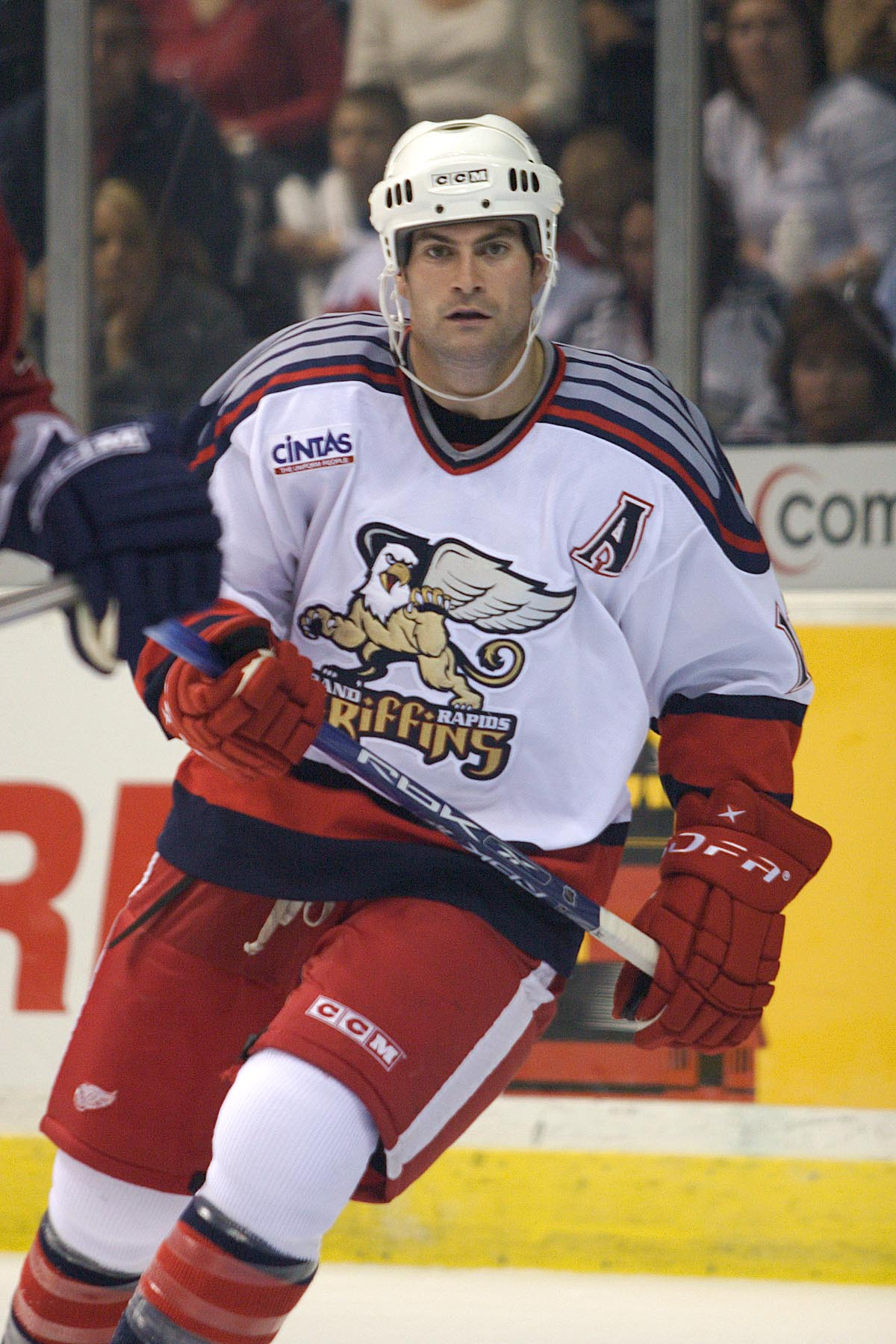
- McDonell with the Grand Rapids Griffins in 2005
- Born: March 1, 1979 (age 46) Williamstown, Ontario, Canada
- Height: 6 ft 2 in (188 cm)
- Weight: 200 lb (91 kg; 14 st 4 lb)
- Position: Right wing
- Shot: Right
- Played for: Columbus Blue Jackets; TPS; Skellefteå AIK; Färjestads BK; AIK IF; Rapperswil-Jona Lakers; Linköpings HC; Malmö Redhawks; Rungsted Seier Capital
- NHL draft: 225th overall, 1997; Carolina Hurricanes; 181st overall, 1999; Detroit Red Wings
- Playing career: 2000–2017

Kent McDonell (born March 1, 1979) is a Canadian former professional ice hockey player, who last played for Rungsted Seier Capital in Denmark. He has played 32 games in the NHL with the Columbus Blue Jackets. McDonell was born and raised in Williamstown, Ontario.

== Career statistics ==
| | | | Regular season | | | | | Playoffs |
| Season | Team | League | GP | G | A | Pts | PIM | GP | G | A | Pts | PIM |
|---|---|---|---|---|---|---|---|---|---|---|---|---|
| 1995–96 | Cornwall Colts | CJHL | 33 | 21 | 14 | 35 | 64 | — | — | — | — | — |
| 1996–97 | Guelph Storm | OHL | 56 | 7 | 5 | 12 | 57 | 16 | 0 | 2 | 2 | 4 |
| 1997–98 | Guelph Storm | OHL | 64 | 28 | 23 | 51 | 76 | 13 | 7 | 4 | 11 | 18 |
| 1998–99 | Guelph Storm | OHL | 60 | 31 | 38 | 69 | 110 | 11 | 4 | 3 | 7 | 36 |
| 1999–00 | Guelph Storm | OHL | 56 | 35 | 35 | 70 | 100 | 6 | 1 | 4 | 5 | 6 |
| 2000–01 | Syracuse Crunch | AHL | 32 | 3 | 3 | 6 | 36 | 3 | 1 | 0 | 1 | 0 |
| 2000–01 | Dayton Bombers | ECHL | 28 | 16 | 9 | 25 | 94 | 3 | 0 | 0 | 0 | 4 |
| 2001–02 | Syracuse Crunch | AHL | 72 | 18 | 13 | 31 | 122 | 3 | 0 | 2 | 2 | 0 |
| 2002–03 | Columbus Blue Jackets | NHL | 3 | 0 | 0 | 0 | 0 | — | — | — | — | — |
| 2002–03 | Syracuse Crunch | AHL | 72 | 14 | 24 | 38 | 93 | — | — | — | — | — |
| 2003–04 | Columbus Blue Jackets | NHL | 29 | 1 | 2 | 3 | 36 | — | — | — | — | — |
| 2003–04 | Syracuse Crunch | AHL | 51 | 17 | 31 | 48 | 102 | 5 | 0 | 1 | 1 | 10 |
| 2004–05 | Aylmer Blues | OHA-Sr. | 5 | 2 | 4 | 6 | 21 | — | — | — | — | — |
| 2004–05 | Bergen IK | Norway | 11 | 12 | 3 | 15 | 75 | — | — | — | — | — |
| 2004–05 | EV Duisburg | Germany2 | 19 | 4 | 9 | 13 | 57 | 10 | 3 | 3 | 6 | 37 |
| 2005–06 | Grand Rapids Griffins | AHL | 77 | 21 | 37 | 58 | 171 | 16 | 5 | 4 | 9 | 20 |
| 2006–07 | HC TPS | Liiga | 45 | 14 | 30 | 44 | 75 | 2 | 0 | 0 | 0 | 0 |
| 2007–08 | Skellefteå AIK | SHL | 49 | 18 | 14 | 32 | 56 | 5 | 1 | 0 | 1 | 4 |
| 2008–09 | Skellefteå AIK | SHL | 55 | 14 | 11 | 25 | 58 | 11 | 1 | 3 | 4 | 8 |
| 2009–10 | Färjestad BK | SHL | 47 | 10 | 11 | 21 | 46 | 7 | 1 | 2 | 3 | 12 |
| 2010–11 | AIK IF | SHL | 39 | 10 | 14 | 24 | 45 | 8 | 3 | 1 | 4 | 6 |
| 2011–12 | AIK IF | SHL | 42 | 11 | 8 | 19 | 26 | 12 | 6 | 6 | 12 | 18 |
| 2011–12 | SC Rapperswil-Jona Lakers | NLA | 10 | 1 | 1 | 2 | 12 | — | — | — | — | — |
| 2012–13 | Karlskrona HK | Allsvenskan | 38 | 6 | 10 | 16 | 64 | 10 | 7 | 5 | 12 | 2 |
| 2013–14 | Linköping HC | SHL | 26 | 13 | 6 | 19 | 14 | 9 | 1 | 0 | 1 | 4 |
| 2014–15 | Linköping HC | SHL | 54 | 3 | 14 | 17 | 40 | 11 | 1 | 1 | 2 | 4 |
| 2015–16 | Malmö Redhawks | SHL | 49 | 11 | 7 | 18 | 16 | — | — | — | — | — |
| 2016–17 | Rungsted Seier Capital | Denmark | 45 | 13 | 17 | 30 | 49 | 4 | 0 | 2 | 2 | 4 |
| NHL totals | | | 32 | 1 | 2 | 3 | 36 | — | — | — | — | — |
| AHL totals | | | 304 | 73 | 108 | 181 | 524 | 27 | 6 | 7 | 13 | 30 |
