= Mats Lavander =

Swedish ice hockey player

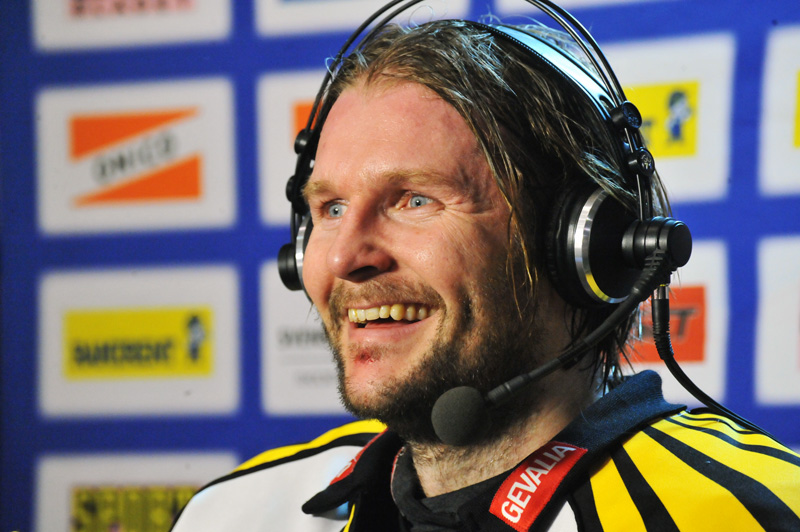
- A Swedish professional ice hockey player
- Born: March 16, 1980 (age 45); Piteå, Sweden
- Height: 6 ft 1 in (185 cm)
- Weight: 213 lb (97 kg; 15 st 3 lb)
- Position: Right wing
- Shot: Left
- Played for: Piteå HC; IF Björklöven; Luleå HF; Brynäs IF
- Playing career: 1999–2016

Mats Lavander (born March 16, 1980) is a Swedish professional ice hockey player currently with the IF Björklöven team in the Swedish HockeyAllsvenskan league. He is the brother of ice hockey player Björn Lavander.

== Career statistics ==
			Regular season					Playoffs
Season	Team	League	GP	G	A	Pts	PIM	GP	G	A	Pts	PIM
1997–98	Piteå HC	Division 1	12	0	0	0	0	—	—	—	—	—
1998–99	Piteå HC	Division 1	35	8	3	11	18	—	—	—	—	—
1999–00	Piteå HC J20	J20 SuperElit	2	1	1	2	4	—	—	—	—	—
1999–00	Piteå HC	Allsvenskan	41	3	5	8	51	—	—	—	—	—
2000–01	Piteå HC	Allsvenskan	38	12	9	21	54	—	—	—	—	—
2001–02	IF Björklöven J20	J20 SuperElit	1	1	0	1	2	—	—	—	—	—
2001–02	IF Björklöven	Allsvenskan	45	7	9	16	14	10	1	1	2	4
2002–03	IF Björklöven J20	J20 SuperElit	1	0	3	3	12	—	—	—	—	—
2002–03	IF Björklöven	Allsvenskan	27	9	7	16	35	4	0	2	2	2
2003–04	IF Björklöven	Allsvenskan	38	15	17	32	32	—	—	—	—	—
2004–05	IF Björklöven	Allsvenskan	44	16	19	35	55	—	—	—	—	—
2005–06	IF Björklöven	HockeyAllsvenskan	42	9	17	26	28	—	—	—	—	—
2006–07	IF Björklöven	HockeyAllsvenskan	45	11	22	33	40	10	3	5	8	10
2006–07	Luleå HF	Elitserien	2	0	0	0	0	—	—	—	—	—
2007–08	Luleå HF	Elitserien	55	9	12	21	18	—	—	—	—	—
2008–09	Luleå HF	Elitserien	53	16	12	28	34	5	1	1	2	27
2009–10	Luleå HF	Elitserien	55	17	13	30	44	—	—	—	—	—
2010–11	Luleå HF	Elitserien	48	6	9	15	10	12	2	0	2	4
2011–12	Brynäs IF	Elitserien	49	7	14	21	50	17	2	1	3	12
2012–13	Brynäs IF	Elitserien	46	0	5	5	62	4	0	0	0	2
2013–14	IF Björklöven	HockeyAllsvenskan	32	3	1	4	18	—	—	—	—	—
2014–15	IF Björklöven	HockeyAllsvenskan	44	4	2	6	12	5	1	0	1	0
2015–16	IF Björklöven	HockeyAllsvenskan	17	0	0	0	14	—	—	—	—	—
Elitserien totals			308	55	65	120	218	38	5	2	7	45
