= Mattias Karlsson (ice hockey) =

Swedish ice hockey player (born 1985)

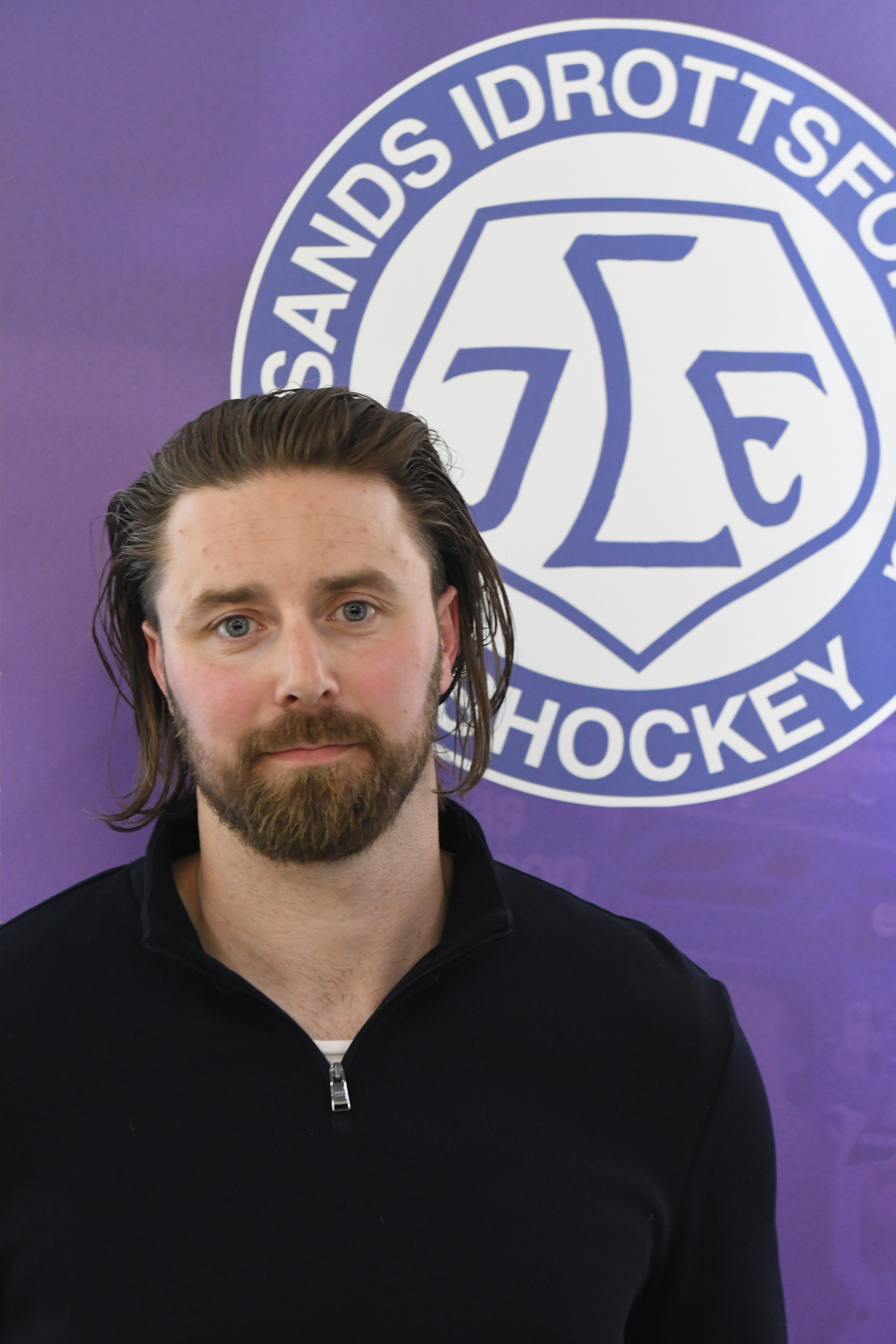
- Born: 15 April 1985 (age 41) Storå, Sweden
- Height: 6 ft 3 in (191 cm)
- Weight: 229 lb (104 kg; 16 st 5 lb)
- Position: Defence
- Shoots: Left
- SHL team Former teams: Leksands IF; Brynäs IF; Binghamton Senators; Färjestads BK; Timrå IK; HV71; Severstal Cherepovets; Karlskrona HK
- NHL draft: 135th overall, 2003; Ottawa Senators
- Playing career: 2003–present

Mattias Karlsson (born 15 April 1985) is a Swedish professional ice hockey player, currently playing with Leksands IF in the Swedish Hockey League (SHL).

== Playing career ==
Karlsson turned professional with Brynäs IF in the 2002–03 season and was drafted in the fourth round of the 2003 NHL entry draft by Ottawa Senators in NHL. He played for Brynäs through 2004–05, before moving to Almtuna IS in 2005–06, before settling down to one team Bofors IK for the 2006–07 season. Karlsson was tied for the team lead in scoring with 32 points (11 goals) in 2006-07 and added 34 penalty minutes in 44 games.

Karlsson signed with the Ottawa Senators in 2007 and played two games with the Senators' AHL team, the Binghamton Senators, before returning to Sweden to play with Färjestads BK on assignment from Ottawa on 26 October 2007.

In 2008, he attended the Ottawa Senators training camp and was assigned to the Binghamton Senators, where he played 73 games, leading the league among rookie defenseman in scoring with 51 points to be named in the All-Rookie Team. In 2009, he returned to Sweden and played for two seasons with Timrå IK before signing with HV71 in 2011.

After spending the 2015–16 season, abroad with Russian club, Severstal Cherepovets in the Kontinental Hockey League (KHL), Larsson returned to Sweden signing with Karlskrona HK.

Karlsson played two SHL seasons with Karlskrona before signing a two-year contract with then HockeyAllsvenskan club, Leskands IF, on 4 May 2018.

== Awards and honours ==
Award	Year
AHL
All-Star Game	2009
All-Rookie Team	2009

== Career statistics ==
=== Regular season and playoffs ===
			Regular season					Playoffs
Season	Team	League	GP	G	A	Pts	PIM	GP	G	A	Pts	PIM
2001–02	Brynäs IF	J18 Allsv	5	2	1	3	6	—	—	—	—	—
2001–02	Brynäs IF	J20	10	0	0	0	6	3	0	1	1	6
2002–03	Brynäs IF	J20	27	11	6	17	93	2	0	0	0	4
2002–03	Brynäs IF	SEL	3	0	0	0	0	—	—	—	—	—
2003–04	Brynäs IF	J20	20	5	8	13	67	5	0	4	4	10
2003–04	Brynäs IF	SEL	39	0	0	0	6	—	—	—	—	—
2004–05	Brynäs IF	J20	13	3	5	8	40	—	—	—	—	—
2004–05	Brynäs IF	SEL	9	0	0	0	2	—	—	—	—	—
2004–05	Almtuna IS	Allsv	22	0	2	2	18	—	—	—	—	—
2005–06	Almtuna IS	J20	2	0	1	1	4	—	—	—	—	—
2005–06	Almtuna IS	Allsv	32	3	4	7	40	—	—	—	—	—
2006–07	Bofors IK	Allsv	44	11	21	32	34	—	—	—	—	—
2007–08	Binghamton Senators	AHL	2	0	0	0	0	—	—	—	—	—
2007–08	Bofors IK	Allsv	24	7	10	17	60	—	—	—	—	—
2007–08	Färjestad BK	SEL	13	2	2	4	4	12	1	3	4	20
2008–09	Binghamton Senators	AHL	73	9	42	51	40	—	—	—	—	—
2009–10	Timrå IK	SEL	37	5	10	15	38	5	1	0	1	29
2010–11	Timrå IK	SEL	53	6	9	15	24	—	—	—	—	—
2011–12	HV71	SEL	54	6	6	12	34	6	2	1	3	4
2012–13	HV71	SEL	55	9	20	29	37	5	0	0	0	0
2013–14	HV71	SHL	11	0	2	2	2	8	0	4	4	2
2014–15	HV71	SHL	54	3	21	24	14	6	1	1	2	2
2015–16	Severstal Cherepovets	KHL	59	1	11	12	14	—	—	—	—	—
2016–17	Karlskrona HK	SHL	49	4	11	15	16	—	—	—	—	—
2017–18	Karlskrona HK	SHL	45	1	12	13	22	—	—	—	—	—
2018–19	Leksands IF	Allsv	45	7	16	23	20	12	2	4	6	2
2019–20	Leksands IF	SHL	33	2	5	7	12	—	—	—	—	—
2021–22	Guldsmedshytte SK	SWE.4	1	1	0	1	0	—	—	—	—	—
2021–22	Häradsbygdens SS	SWE.5	8	5	4	9	2	9	1	8	9	4
SEL/SHL totals			455	38	98	136	211	42	5	9	14	57
Allsv totals			167	28	53	81	172	12	2	4	6	2

=== International ===
Year	Team	Event	GP	G	A	Pts	PIM
2002	Sweden	U18	5	1	0	1	31
2003	Sweden	WJC18	6	1	3	4	16
Junior totals			11	2	3	5	47
