= Tomas Skogs =

Swedish ice hockey player

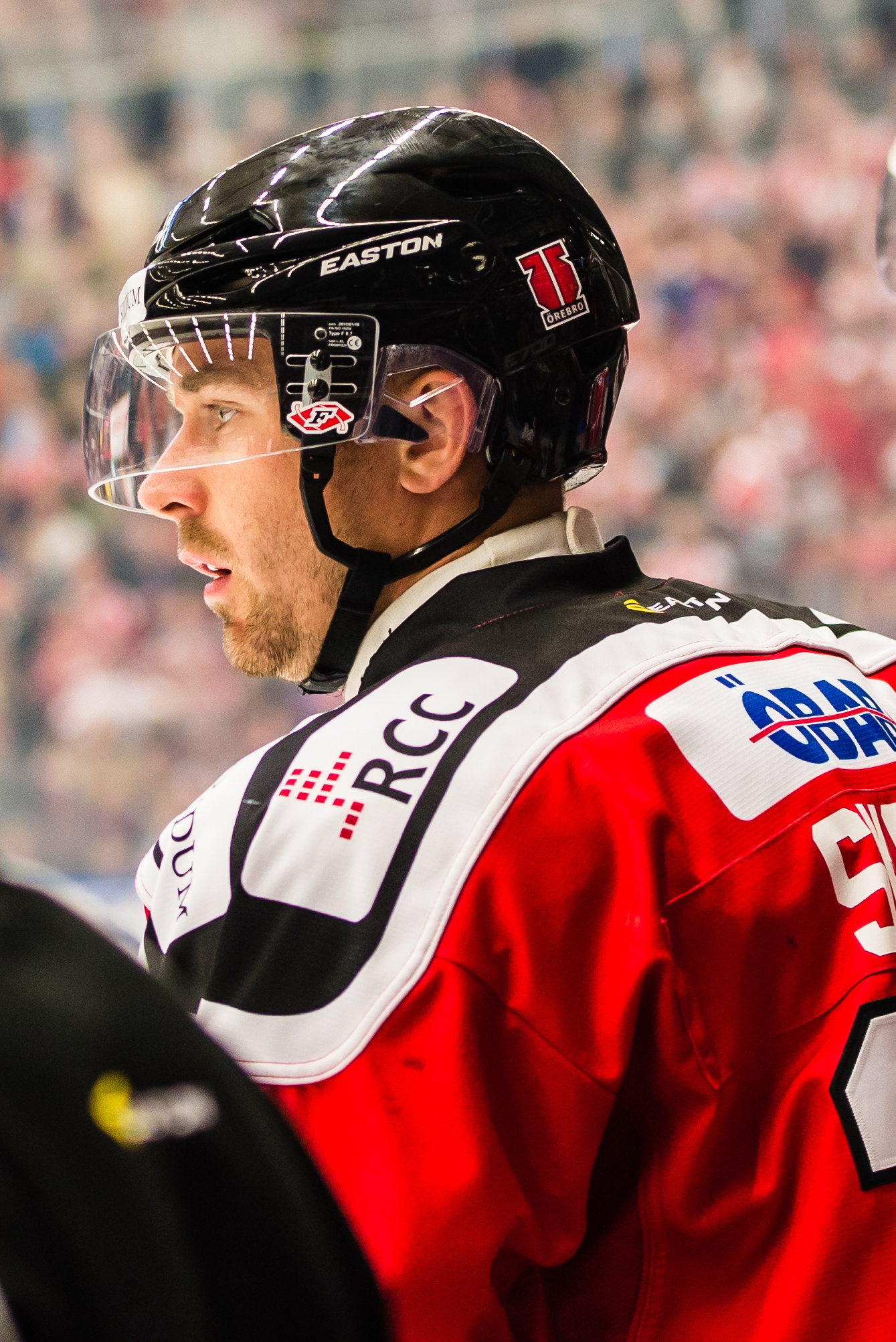
- Born: February 19, 1984 (age 42) Mora, Sweden
- Height: 5 ft 10 in (178 cm)
- Weight: 191 lb (87 kg; 13 st 9 lb)
- Position: Defence
- Shot: Left
- Played for: Mora IK; Timrå IK; Skellefteå AIK; Örebro HK; Färjestad BK
- Playing career: 2002–2020

Tomas Skogs (born February 19, 1984) is a Swedish former professional ice hockey defenceman who most notably played for Mora IK in the HockeyAllsvenskan (Allsv).

== Career statistics ==
			Regular season					Playoffs
Season	Team	League	GP	G	A	Pts	PIM	GP	G	A	Pts	PIM
1999–00	Mora IK J18	J18 Allsvenskan	4	0	0	0	0	1	0	0	0	0
2000–01	Mora IK J18	J18 Allsvenskan	7	0	2	2	2	7	0	0	0	2
2000–01	Mora IK J20	J20 SuperElit	19	5	0	5	41	—	—	—	—	—
2001–02	Mora IK J18	J18 Allsvenskan	—	—	—	—	—	1	0	0	0	2
2001–02	Mora IK J20	J20 SuperElit	32	9	9	18	42	—	—	—	—	—
2001–02	Mora IK	Allsvenskan	7	0	0	0	0	3	0	0	0	0
2002–03	Mora IK J20	J20 SuperElit	6	1	2	3	10	—	—	—	—	—
2002–03	Mora IK	Allsvenskan	35	3	3	6	20	—	—	—	—	—
2003–04	Mora IK	Allsvenskan	45	3	4	7	30	10	0	2	2	4
2004–05	Mora IK J20	U20 Nationell	5	3	0	3	18	—	—	—	—	—
2004–05	Mora IK	Elitserien	2	0	0	0	0	—	—	—	—	—
2004–05	Halmstad Hammers HC	Allsvenskan	17	0	1	1	22	—	—	—	—	—
2004–05	Nyköpings Hockey	Allsvenskan	13	0	3	3	14	10	0	2	2	30
2005–06	Mora IK	Elitserien	37	1	4	5	34	5	1	0	1	6
2006–07	Mora IK J20	J20 SuperElit	1	0	0	0	0	—	—	—	—	—
2006–07	Mora IK	Elitserien	44	3	5	8	62	4	0	0	0	4
2007–08	Mora IK	Elitserien	52	9	9	18	93	—	—	—	—	—
2008–09	Timrå IK	Elitserien	55	1	6	7	44	7	0	0	0	10
2009–10	Timrå IK	Elitserien	49	4	12	16	44	3	1	0	1	0
2010–11	Timrå IK	Elitserien	43	1	7	8	50	—	—	—	—	—
2011–12	Skellefteå AIK	Elitserien	44	2	5	7	14	19	1	1	2	6
2012–13	Skellefteå AIK	Elitserien	51	3	10	13	42	13	0	1	1	8
2013–14	Örebro HK	SHL	55	2	6	8	28	—	—	—	—	—
2014–15	Örebro HK	SHL	43	4	7	11	26	6	0	1	1	2
2015–16	Färjestad BK	SHL	38	2	10	12	24	5	0	0	0	2
2016–17	Färjestad BK	SHL	41	0	7	7	24	5	0	0	0	4
2017–18	Mora IK	SHL	45	1	9	10	20	—	—	—	—	—
2018–19	Mora IK	SHL	31	0	1	1	8	—	—	—	—	—
2019–20	Mora IK	HockeyAllsvenskan	25	0	5	5	14	—	—	—	—	—
SHL/Elitserien totals			630	33	98	131	513	67	3	3	6	42
Allsvenskan totals			117	6	11	17	86	23	0	4	4	34
