= Jonathan Granström =

Swedish ice hockey player

- Born: March 9, 1986 (age 39) Orsa, Sweden
- Height: 5 ft 10 in (178 cm)
- Weight: 194 lb (88 kg; 13 st 12 lb)
- Position: Center
- Shot: Left
- Played for: Mora IK; Brynäs IF; Luleå HF
- Playing career: 2004–2018

Jonathan Granström (born March 9, 1986, in Orsa) is a Swedish former professional ice hockey player. He last played with Brynäs IF in the Swedish Hockey League (SHL). After playing two season with Luleå HF, Granström returned to Brynäs IF on a three-year deal on April 18, 2016.

== Career statistics ==
			Regular season					Playoffs
Season	Team	League	GP	G	A	Pts	PIM	GP	G	A	Pts	PIM
2000–01	Mora IK U16	U16 SM	3	1	0	1	2	—	—	—	—	—
2001–02	Mora IK U16		—	—	—	—	—	—	—	—	—	—
2001–02	Mora IK J18	J18 Allsvenskan	4	0	1	1	0	—	—	—	—	—
2002–03	Mora IK J18	J18 Allsvenskan	7	2	5	7	10	1	0	0	0	2
2002–03	Mora IK J20	J20 SuperElit	10	0	2	2	12	—	—	—	—	—
2003–04	Mora IK J20	J20 SuperElit	34	16	17	33	22	—	—	—	—	—
2003–04	Mora IK	Allsvenskan	—	—	—	—	—	4	0	0	0	0
2004–05	Mora IK J20	J20 SuperElit	32	11	16	27	48	2	1	0	1	4
2004–05	Mora IK	Elitserien	2	0	0	0	2	—	—	—	—	—
2005–06	Mora IK J20	J20 SuperElit	11	3	10	13	20	—	—	—	—	—
2005–06	Mora IK	Elitserien	43	0	5	5	49	5	0	0	0	10
2006–07	Mora IK J20	J20 SuperElit	2	3	1	4	0	—	—	—	—	—
2006–07	Mora IK	Elitserien	50	3	1	4	18	2	0	0	0	6
2007–08	Brynäs IF	Elitserien	54	7	4	11	34	—	—	—	—	—
2008–09	Brynäs IF	Elitserien	55	10	16	26	112	4	0	0	0	27
2009–10	Brynäs IF	Elitserien	55	10	18	28	66	5	1	2	3	4
2010–11	Brynäs IF	Elitserien	50	5	20	25	48	5	1	1	2	4
2011–12	Brynäs IF	Elitserien	42	5	8	13	91	17	5	5	10	30
2012–13	Brynäs IF	Elitserien	54	4	15	19	101	2	0	0	0	6
2013–14	Brynäs IF	SHL	33	2	9	11	36	5	0	1	1	14
2014–15	Luleå HF	SHL	54	7	8	15	84	9	1	1	2	6
2015–16	Luleå HF	SHL	49	13	10	23	30	11	5	6	11	14
2016–17	Brynäs IF	SHL	46	7	10	17	38	18	2	6	8	8
2017–18	Brynäs IF	SHL	43	7	6	13	79	3	0	0	0	0
2018–19	Brynäs IF	SHL	—	—	—	—	—	—	—	—	—	—
SHL (Elitserien) totals			630	80	130	210	788	86	15	22	37	129

== Awards and honors ==
Award	Year
SHL
Le Mat trophy (Brynäs IF)	2012
