= Christian Sandberg =

Swedish ice hockey player

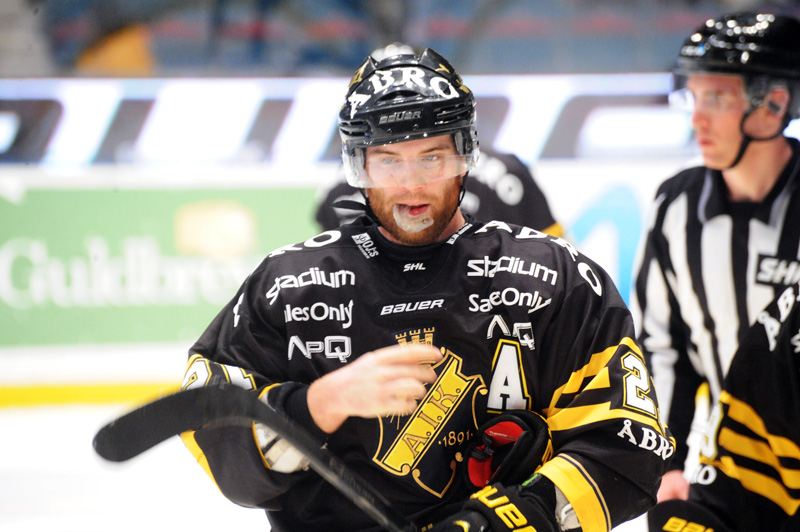
- Born: October 23, 1987 (age 38) Järfälla, Sweden
- Height: 5 ft 9 in (175 cm)
- Weight: 187 lb (85 kg; 13 st 5 lb)
- Position: Centre
- Shot: Right
- Played for: AIK; HV71
- Playing career: 2010–2023

Christian Sandberg (born October 23, 1987) is a Swedish former professional ice hockey player (centre) who played as captain with AIK of the HockeyAllsvenskan (Allsv). Sandberg has a brother, Filip Sandberg, and a cousin, Tobias Sandberg, both also playing professional ice hockey. Sandberg played as a youth with IK Bele.

Sanberg only played two seasons away from AIK, featuring with HV71 in the Swedish Hockey League during the 2019–20 and 2020–21 seasons before returning to AIK 7 July 2021.

== Career statistics ==
			Regular season					Playoffs
Season	Team	League	GP	G	A	Pts	PIM	GP	G	A	Pts	PIM
2003–04	AIK IF J20	J20 SuperElit	1	0	0	0	0	3	0	0	0	0
2004–05	AIK IF J18	J18 Allsvenskan	3	2	2	4	20	—	—	—	—	—
2004–05	AIK IF J20	J20 SuperElit	34	8	8	16	20	—	—	—	—	—
2004–05	AIK IF	Division 1	1	0	0	0	0	1	0	0	0	0
2005–06	AIK IF J20	J20 SuperElit	41	13	8	21	78	—	—	—	—	—
2005–06	AIK IF	HockeyAllsvenskan	8	0	0	0	4	—	—	—	—	—
2006–07	AIK IF J20	J20 SuperElit	6	3	3	6	6	—	—	—	—	—
2006–07	AIK IF	HockeyAllsvenskan	43	14	13	27	16	—	—	—	—	—
2007–08	AIK IF J20	J20 SuperElit	2	2	4	6	16	—	—	—	—	—
2007–08	AIK IF	HockeyAllsvenskan	44	10	16	26	26	—	—	—	—	—
2008–09	AIK IF	HockeyAllsvenskan	44	20	29	49	80	10	1	5	6	8
2009–10	AIK IF	HockeyAllsvenskan	51	20	27	47	67	10	1	5	6	12
2010–11	AIK IF	Elitserien	50	11	11	22	24	8	4	2	6	4
2011–12	AIK IF	Elitserien	36	6	6	12	10	12	4	5	9	4
2012–13	AIK IF	Elitserien	31	4	7	11	8	—	—	—	—	—
2013–14	AIK IF	SHL	41	5	5	10	24	—	—	—	—	—
2014–15	AIK IF	HockeyAllsvenskan	42	9	9	18	28	—	—	—	—	—
2015–16	AIK IF	HockeyAllsvenskan	46	14	16	30	44	10	3	2	5	12
2016–17	AIK IF	HockeyAllsvenskan	39	16	13	29	18	8	2	5	7	2
2017–18	AIK IF	HockeyAllsvenskan	47	9	22	31	28	5	1	3	4	4
2018–19	AIK IF	HockeyAllsvenskan	49	11	18	29	20	7	1	0	1	2
2019–20	HV71	SHL	32	3	4	7	12	—	—	—	—	—
2020–21	HV71	SHL	47	1	4	5	26	—	—	—	—	—
2021–22	AIK IF	HockeyAllsvenskan	49	5	7	12	20	2	0	0	0	0
2022–23	AIK IF	HockeyAllsvenskan	37	0	9	9	12	8	1	2	3	0
SHL (Elitserien) totals			237	30	37	67	104	20	8	7	15	8
HockeyAllsvenskan totals			499	128	179	307	363	60	10	22	32	40
