= Jesper Ollas =

Swedish ice hockey player

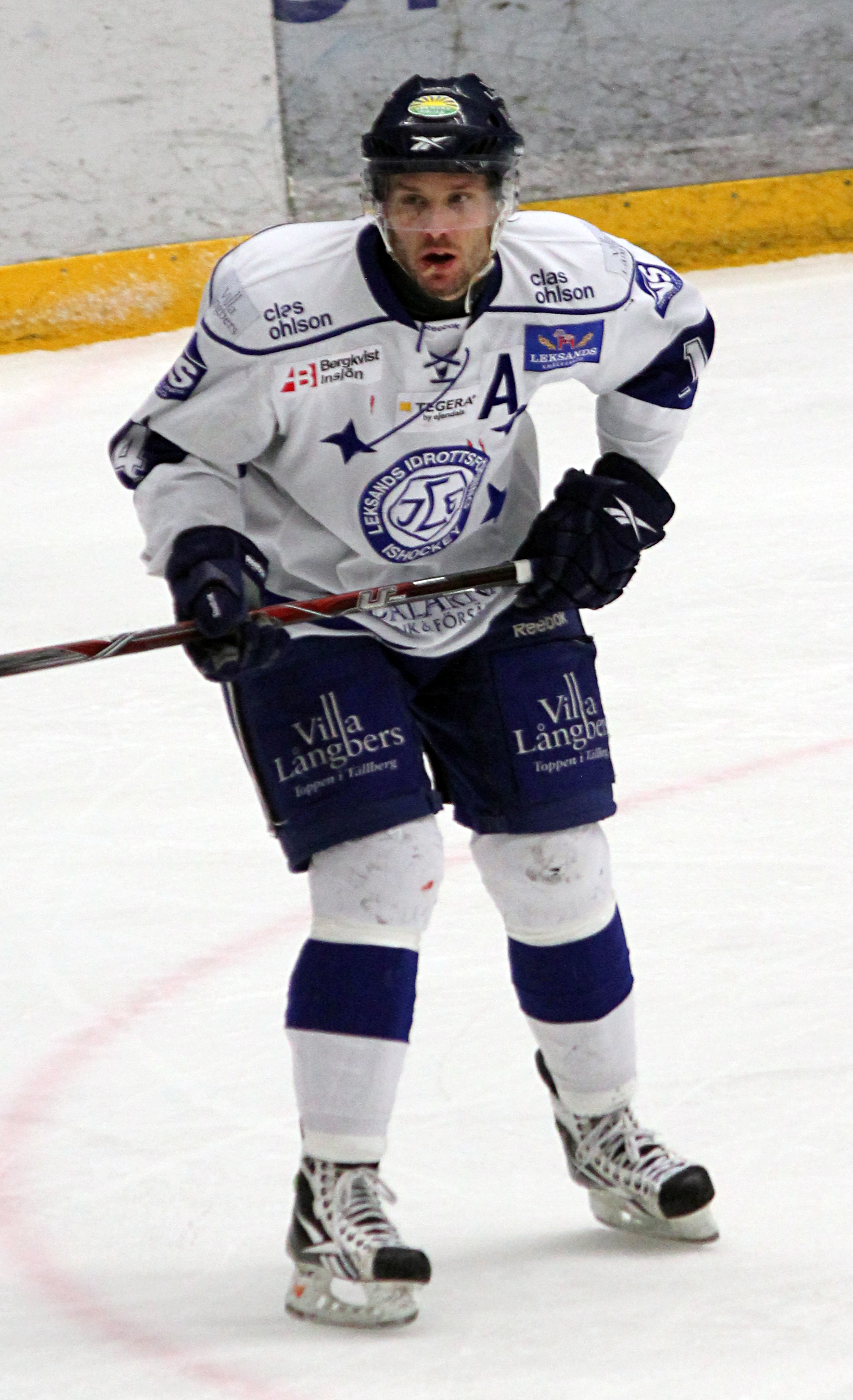
- Jesper Ollas in 2011
- Born: April 27, 1984 (age 42) Norrköping, Sweden
- Height: 6 ft 0 in (183 cm)
- Weight: 198 lb (90 kg; 14 st 2 lb)
- Position: Right wing
- Shoots: Right
- Allsv team Former teams: Leksands IF; Brynäs IF
- Playing career: 2003–present

Jesper Ollas (born April 27, 1984) is a Swedish professional ice hockey player currently playing as Captain of Leksands IF of the HockeyAllsvenskan (Allsv).

During his initial tenure with Leksand, Ollas played an Elitserien season in 2005–06, he has also played in the top flight SHL with Brynäs IF, capturing the Le Mat trophy in the 2011–12 season.

== Awards and honors ==
Award	Year
SHL
Le Mat trophy (Brynäs IF)	2012
