= Christian Söderström =

Swedish ice hockey player (born 1980)

- Born: October 13, 1980 (age 45) Sundsvall, Sweden
- Height: 6 ft 0 in (183 cm)
- Weight: 190 lb (86 kg; 13 st 8 lb)
- Position: Left wing
- Shot: Left
- HockeyAllsvenskan team Former teams: IF Sundsvall; Färjestads BK; Skellefteå AIK; Timrå IK; HC Pustertal; Ässät; Lørenskog IK
- National team: Sweden
- NHL draft: 262nd overall, 2002; Detroit Red Wings
- Playing career: 2000–2016

Christian Söderström (born October 13, 1980) is a Swedish professional ice hockey forward who currently plays with IF Sundsvall in the Swedish HockeyAllsvenskan.

He was drafted by the Detroit Red Wings in the 2002 NHL entry draft in 9th round as the 262nd pick overall. After playing for his home town club Timrå IK since he started playing hockey as a young boy, Söderström transferred himself to league rivals Färjestads BK in January 2006. And it was a lucky move for Söderstörm, because Timrå did not make it to the playoffs and that did Färjestad and they did also won the playoffs and the Swedish Championship in April 2006. After the playoffs he signed a new two-year-contract with Färjestad.

Söderström has played some for the Swedish national team, but never in a major tournament.

== Career statistics ==
			Regular season					Playoffs
Season	Team	League	GP	G	A	Pts	PIM	GP	G	A	Pts	PIM
1997–98	Timrå IK	J20	27	7	10	17	22	—	—	—	—	—
1998–99	Timrå IK	J20
1998–99	Timrå IK	SWE.2	3	0	1	1	2	—	—	—	—	—
1999–2000	Timrå IK	J20	3	4	3	7	0	—	—	—	—	—
1999–2000	Timrå IK	Allsv	43	8	6	14	12	10	1	0	1	2
2000–01	Timrå IK	SEL	46	6	6	12	16	—	—	—	—	—
2001–02	Timrå IK	SEL	48	8	8	16	16	—	—	—	—	—
2002–03	Timrå IK	SEL	44	5	10	15	6	10	1	2	3	2
2003–04	Timrå IK	SEL	48	7	6	13	62	10	1	1	2	4
2004–05	Timrå IK	SEL	48	9	6	15	22	5	1	1	2	0
2005–06	Timrå IK	SEL	39	4	4	8	10	—	—	—	—	—
2005–06	Färjestads BK	SEL	10	1	1	2	2	18	2	1	3	6
2006–07	Färjestads BK	SEL	53	11	10	21	36	9	2	4	6	4
2007–08	Färjestads BK	SEL	45	10	6	16	24	11	0	0	0	14
2008–09	Skellefteå AIK	SEL	53	14	15	29	14	11	2	4	6	2
2009–10	Skellefteå AIK	SEL	48	11	20	31	20	11	1	2	3	4
2010–11	Skellefteå AIK	SEL	54	10	15	25	20	18	5	6	11	4
2011–12	Skellefteå AIK	SEL	49	8	11	19	22	19	3	0	3	2
2012–13	Timrå IK	SEL	47	7	7	14	16	—	—	—	—	—
2013–14	HC Pustertal Wölfe	ITA	28	12	28	40	14	—	—	—	—	—
2013–14	Ässät	Liiga	11	0	2	2	4	—	—	—	—	—
2014–15	Lørenskog IK	NOR	40	18	22	40	54	6	0	1	1	0
2015–16	IF Sundsvall Hockey	Allsv	47	13	22	35	10	10	3	3	6	0
SEL totals			632	111	125	236	286	122	18	21	39	42
