= Jörgen Sundqvist (ice hockey) =

Swedish ice hockey player (born 1982)

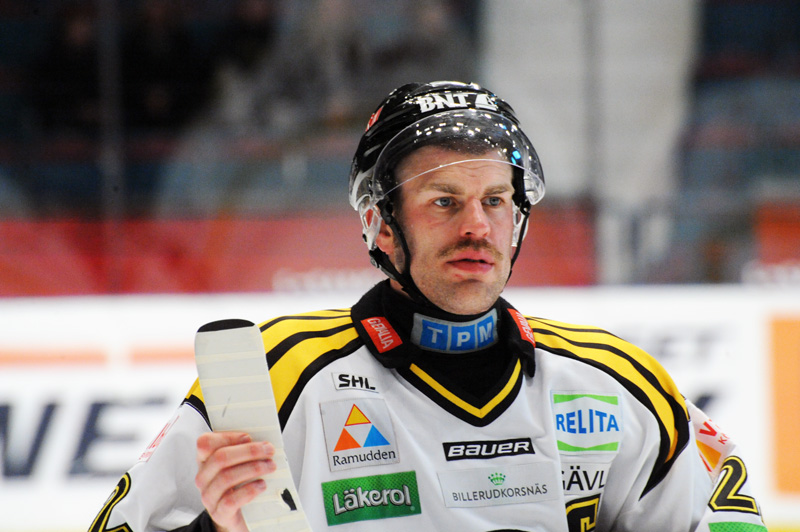
- Born: September 24, 1982 (age 43) Härnösand, Sweden
- Height: 6 ft 0 in (183 cm)
- Weight: 190 lb (86 kg; 13 st 8 lb)
- Position: Defence
- Shot: Left
- Played for: Leksands IF; Borlänge HF; IFK Arboga IK; Skellefteå AIK; Brynäs IF; Gävle GIK
- Playing career: 2000–2024

Ulf Erik Jörgen Sundqvist (born September 24, 1982) is a Swedish professional ice hockey defenceman. He currently plays for Brynäs IF of the Swedish Hockey League (SHL).

Sundqvist has played with Brynäs IF since 2005 and, in March 2014, he signed an extension to keep him with the club until 2018.

== Career statistics ==
			Regular season					Playoffs
Season	Team	League	GP	G	A	Pts	PIM	GP	G	A	Pts	PIM
1999–00	Leksands IF J18	J18 Allsvenskan	—	—	—	—	—	4	1	2	3	8
1999–00	Leksands IF J20	J20 SuperElit	32	5	5	10	70	2	0	0	0	2
1999–00	Leksands IF	Elitserien	2	0	0	0	2	—	—	—	—	—
2000–01	Leksands IF J20	J20 SuperElit	21	7	8	15	81	5	1	2	3	4
2000–01	Leksands IF	Elitserien	10	0	0	0	2	—	—	—	—	—
2000–01	Borlänge HF	Division 1	3	0	1	1	6	—	—	—	—	—
2001–02	Leksands IF J20	J20 SuperElit	3	0	1	1	6	4	0	1	1	6
2001–02	Leksands IF	Allsvenskan	38	3	0	3	40	3	0	0	0	2
2002–03	Leksands IF J20	J20 SuperElit	2	1	1	2	4	—	—	—	—	—
2002–03	Leksands IF	Elitserien	22	0	2	2	37	—	—	—	—	—
2002–03	IFK Arboga IK	Allsvenskan	17	2	3	5	20	5	0	0	0	4
2003–04	Skellefteå AIK	Allsvenskan	46	5	5	10	50	10	2	0	2	18
2004–05	Skellefteå AIK	Allsvenskan	46	7	8	15	50	10	1	1	2	6
2005–06	Brynäs IF	Elitserien	50	8	4	12	48	4	0	0	0	2
2006–07	Brynäs IF	Elitserien	55	3	3	6	60	7	0	0	0	2
2007–08	Brynäs IF	Elitserien	55	5	4	9	72	—	—	—	—	—
2008–09	Brynäs IF	Elitserien	54	4	4	8	74	4	0	0	0	12
2009–10	Brynäs IF	Elitserien	50	5	4	9	58	5	0	0	0	6
2010–11	Brynäs IF	Elitserien	54	0	3	3	59	5	0	0	0	8
2011–12	Brynäs IF	Elitserien	52	2	1	3	59	17	1	2	3	12
2012–13	Brynäs IF	Elitserien	54	3	2	5	60	4	0	0	0	10
2013–14	Brynäs IF	SHL	55	1	5	6	52	5	0	0	0	0
2014–15	Brynäs IF	SHL	20	1	1	2	16	—	—	—	—	—
2015–16	Brynäs IF	SHL	47	0	6	6	20	3	1	0	1	0
2016–17	Brynäs IF	SHL	8	0	0	0	2	—	—	—	—	—
2017–18	Brynäs IF	SHL	37	2	2	4	53	7	0	0	0	0
2022–23	Gävle GIK	Division 3	—	—	—	—	—	7	3	0	3	6
2023–24	Gävle GIK	Division 2	2	0	0	0	0	—	—	—	—	—
SHL/Elitserien totals			625	34	41	75	674	61	2	2	4	52

== Awards and honors ==
Award	Year
SHL
Le Mat trophy (Brynäs IF)	2012
