= Stefan Johansson (ice hockey) =

Swedish ice hockey player

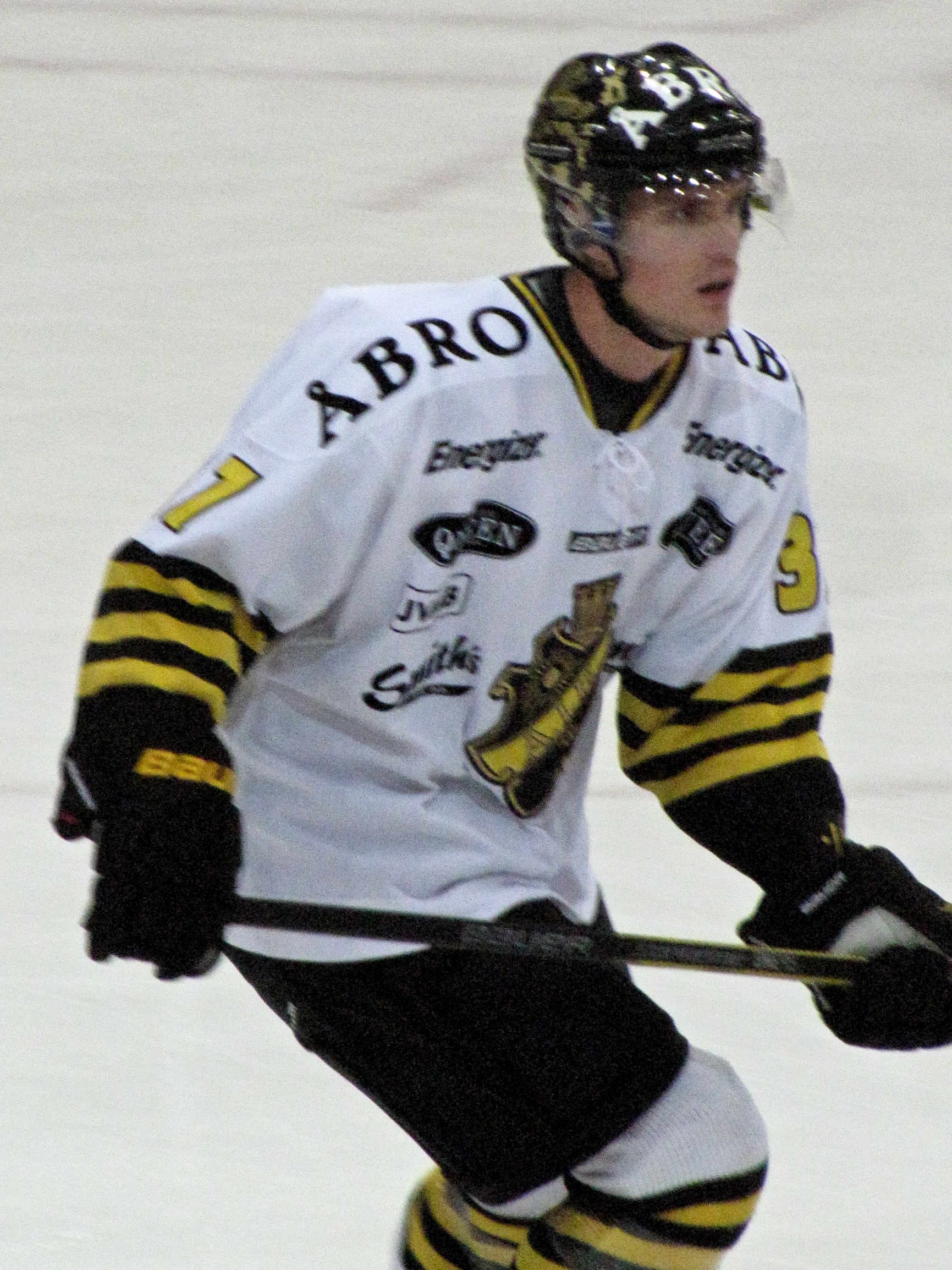
- Born: March 15, 1988 (age 38) Piteå
- Height: 6 ft 1 in (185 cm)
- Weight: 190 lb (86 kg; 13 st 8 lb)
- Position: Defenceman
- Shot: Left
- Played for: Piteå HC; AIK; HV71; Örebro HK; Södertälje SK
- National team: Sweden
- Playing career: 2005–2019

Stefan Johansson (born March 15, 1988 in Piteå) is a Swedish professional ice hockey defenceman currently playing in AIK of the Elitserien. Johansson has also played in Sweden's national junior team (U17). His youth team is Munksunds SSK.

== Career statistics ==
			Regular season					Playoffs
Season	Team	League	GP	G	A	Pts	PIM	GP	G	A	Pts	PIM
2004–05	Luleå HF J18	J18 Allsvenskan	12	1	1	2	14	—	—	—	—	—
2005–06	Piteå HC J20	Division 2	—	—	—	—	—	2	0	1	1	10
2005–06	Piteå HC	Division 1	6	0	1	1	4	—	—	—	—	—
2006–07	Piteå HC	Division 1	26	5	11	16	30	7	1	0	1	6
2007–08	Piteå HC J20	Division 2	2	0	0	0	0	2	2	0	2	0
2007–08	Piteå HC	Division 1	30	3	14	17	38	—	—	—	—	—
2007–08	Skellefteå AIK J20	J20 SuperElit	3	3	0	3	2	—	—	—	—	—
2008–09	AIK IF	HockeyAllsvenskan	45	4	3	7	46	10	1	1	2	6
2009–10	AIK IF	HockeyAllsvenskan	43	4	11	15	26	10	1	0	1	4
2010–11	AIK IF	Elitserien	50	6	3	9	32	8	2	0	2	4
2011–12	AIK IF	Elitserien	55	4	9	13	30	10	2	3	5	8
2012–13	AIK IF	Elitserien	47	4	8	12	20	—	—	—	—	—
2013–14	HV71	SHL	51	3	6	9	22	8	0	0	0	8
2014–15	Örebro HK	SHL	46	1	0	1	14	1	0	0	0	2
2015–16	Örebro HK	SHL	5	0	0	0	2	—	—	—	—	—
2015–16	AIK IF	HockeyAllsvenskan	7	0	6	6	6	—	—	—	—	—
2016–17	AIK IF	HockeyAllsvenskan	52	3	9	12	46	6	1	0	1	0
2017–18	Södertälje SK	HockeyAllsvenskan	46	1	10	11	34	5	2	2	4	4
2018–19	Södertälje SK	HockeyAllsvenskan	33	0	5	5	16	—	—	—	—	—
SHL (Elitserien) totals			254	18	26	44	120	27	4	3	7	22
HockeyAllsvenskan totals			226	12	44	56	174	31	5	3	8	14
