= Niklas Svedberg =

Swedish ice hockey goaltender

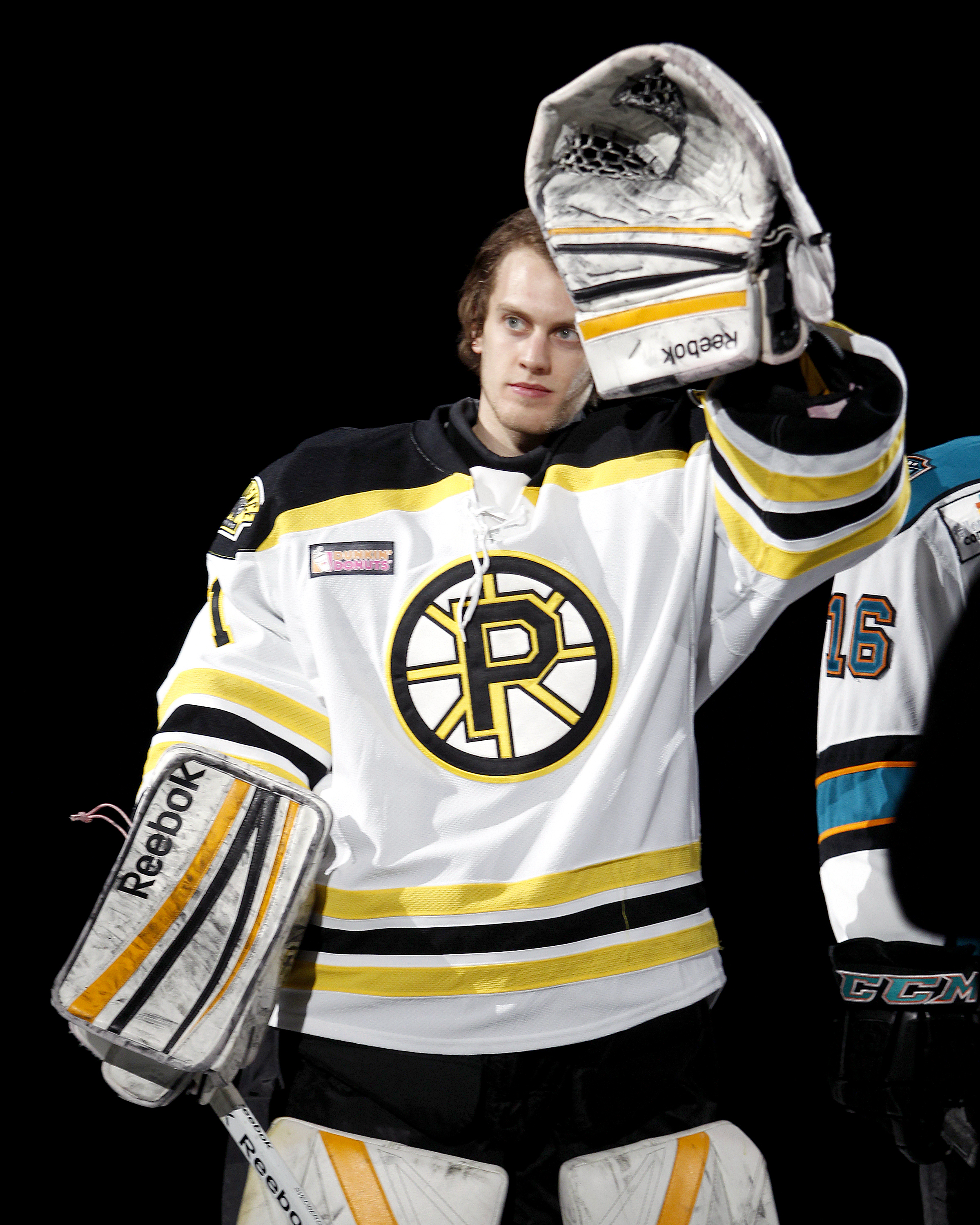
- Svedberg at the 2013 AHL All-Star Game
- Born: 4 September 1989 (age 36) Sollentuna, Sweden
- Height: 6 ft 1 in (185 cm)
- Weight: 176 lb (80 kg; 12 st 8 lb)
- Position: Goaltender
- Catches: Left
- ICEHL team Former teams: HC Bolzano; Modo Hockey; Brynäs IF; Boston Bruins; Salavat Yulaev Ufa; Timrå IK; Djurgårdens IF; Fischtown Pinguins
- NHL draft: Undrafted
- Playing career: 2008–present

Niklas Svedberg (born 4 September 1989) is a Swedish professional ice hockey goaltender currently playing under contract with the HC Bolzano of the ICE Hockey League (ICEHL). He won a Swedish championship title in 2012 with Brynäs IF.

== Playing career ==
On 29 May 2012, the Boston Bruins announced that they had signed Svedberg from the Swedish Elite League to an Entry Level Contract. Svedberg made his AHL debut on 19 October 2012 against the Manchester Monarchs. Svedberg was called up to the Boston Bruins on 24 May 2013. Svedberg was also voted as the AHL 2012–13 goalie of the year.

Svedberg made his NHL debut on 2 January 2014 in a home game against the Nashville Predators, playing all 60:50 of game time into a short overtime, resulting in a 3-2 Bruins win.

After the Bruins were eliminated by the Montreal Canadiens in the 2014 Stanley Cup playoffs, on 23 June 2014 Svedberg was signed to a one-year, one-way contract by the Bruins, in anticipation of 2013–14 Bruins backup goaltender Chad Johnson becoming an unrestricted free agent. He appeared in 18 games with the Bruins over the course of the season, collecting 7 wins

As a restricted free agent after his first year as the Bruins backup in the 2014–15 season, Svedberg opted to sign a one-year KHL contract with Russian club, Salavat Yulaev Ufa on 10 May 2015. After leading all KHL goaltenders in games won during 2015–16, he re-signed a two-year contract extension with Salavat.

Sveberg was released from the final year of his contract with Salavat in order to return to the NHL ranks, agreeing to a one-year, two-way contract as a free agent with the Minnesota Wild on 1 July 2017. In the 2017–18 season within the Wild organization, Svedberg was assigned for the duration of the year to AHL affiliate, the Iowa Wild. In 44 appearances he compiled 18 wins with 18 losses.

On June 8, 2018, Svedberg as an impending free agent signed a two-year contract to return to Sweden with Timrå IK in the SHL. In the 2018–19 season, Svedberg registered just 10 wins in 35 games with Timrå IK, unable to keep the club from suffering relegation to the Allsvenskan.

In order to continue in the SHL, Svedberg left Timrå IK and agreed to join original hometown junior club, Djurgårdens IF for the final year of his contract on 7 June 2019.

== Career statistics ==
			Regular season									Playoffs
Season	Team	League	GP	W	L	T/OT	MIN	GA	SO	GAA	SV%	GP	W	L	MIN	GA	SO	GAA	SV%
2007–08	Modo Hockey	SEL	1	0	0	0	8	1	0	7.11	.666	—	—	—	—	—	—	—	—
2008–09	Modo Hockey	SEL	3	0	3	0	178	16	0	5.41	.828	—	—	—	—	—	—	—	—
2008–09	Huddinge IK	Allsv	24	8	15	0	1376	74	2	3.23	.897	—	—	—	—	—	—	—	—
2009–10	Modo Hockey	SEL	32	12	14	6	1899	82	1	2.59	.900	—	—	—	—	—	—	—	—
2010–11	Brynäs IF	SEL	21	11	6	4	1261	48	2	2.28	.917	—	—	—	—	—	—	—	—
2010–11	Mora IK	Allsv	2	1	1	0	120	5	0	2.50	.931	—	—	—	—	—	—	—	—
2011–12	Brynäs IF	SEL	29	12	12	4	1726	71	0	2.47	.912	13	10	3	814	23	4	1.70	.947
2012–13	Providence Bruins	AHL	48	37	8	2	2873	104	4	2.17	.925	12	6	6	675	37	0	3.29	.889
2013–14	Providence Bruins	AHL	45	25	15	4	2602	114	2	2.63	.910	9	4	4	510	23	1	2.70	.905
2013–14	Boston Bruins	NHL	1	1	0	0	61	2	0	1.97	.943	—	—	—	—	—	—	—	—
2014–15	Boston Bruins	NHL	18	7	5	1	900	35	2	2.33	.918	—	—	—	—	—	—	—	—
2014–15	Providence Bruins	AHL	4	3	1	0	239	11	0	2.76	.911	—	—	—	—	—	—	—	—
2015–16	Salavat Yulaev Ufa	KHL	53	29	19	3	3058	121	5	2.37	.916	19	9	10	1111	47	0	2.54	.912
2016–17	Salavat Yulaev Ufa	KHL	48	14	17	12	2528	126	1	2.99	.897	5	1	4	272	8	0	1.76	.933
2017–18	Iowa Wild	AHL	44	18	18	7	2613	125	2	2.87	.905	—	—	—	—	—	—	—	—
2018–19	Timrå IK	SHL	35	10	23	0	1942	111	2	3.42	.888	—	—	—	—	—	—	—	—
2019–20	Djurgårdens IF	SHL	35	21	14	0	2029	78	5	2.31	.917	—	—	—	—	—	—	—	—
2020–21	Djurgårdens IF	SHL	23	6	17	0	1308	66	1	3.03	.889	—	—	—	—	—	—	—	—
2021–22	Djurgårdens IF	SHL	10	2	7	0	557	32	0	3.45	.881	—	—	—	—	—	—	—	—
2022–23	Fischtown Pinguins	DEL	12	4	8	0	726	30	0	2.48	.904	1	0	0	20	2	0	6.00	.667
SHL totals			175	74	96	14	10,908	505	11	2.75	.902	13	10	3	814	23	4	1.70	.947
NHL totals			19	8	5	1	961	37	2	2.31	.920	—	—	—	—	—	—	—	—
KHL totals			101	43	36	15	5586	247	6	2.65	.907	24	10	14	1383	55	1	2.39	.916

Awards
Preceded by Yann Danis	Aldege "Baz" Bastien Memorial Award; 2012–13	Succeeded by Jake Allen
