= Joachim Rohdin =

Swedish ice hockey player

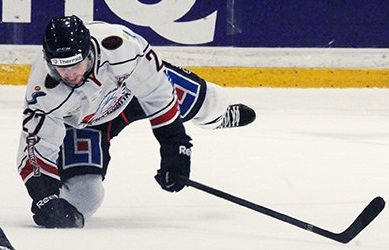
- Born: October 3, 1991 (age 34) Gävle, Sweden
- Height: 6 ft 0 in (183 cm)
- Weight: 203 lb (92 kg; 14 st 7 lb)
- Position: Right wing
- Shoots: Right
- Liiga team Former teams: Porin Ässät; Mikkelin Jukurit; Brynäs IF; Timrå IK; Linköpings HC; Färjestad BK; Karlskrona HK
- Playing career: 2010–present

Carl Joachim Rohdin (born October 3, 1991) is a Swedish professional ice hockey player. He plays for Porin Ässät of the Liiga.
