= Erik Forssell =

Swedish ice hockey player

- Born: January 30, 1982 (age 43); Skellefteå, Sweden
- Height: 5 ft 9 in (175 cm)
- Weight: 185 lb (84 kg; 13 st 3 lb)
- Position: Centre
- Shot: Left
- Played for: Skellefteå AIK; Malmö Redhawks
- Playing career: 2001–2018

Erik Forssell (born January 30, 1982) is a Swedish former professional ice hockey player who last played for Skellefteå AIK and the Malmö Redhawks in the Swedish Hockey League (SHL).
