= Daniel Larsson (ice hockey) =

Swedish ice hockey player (born 1986)

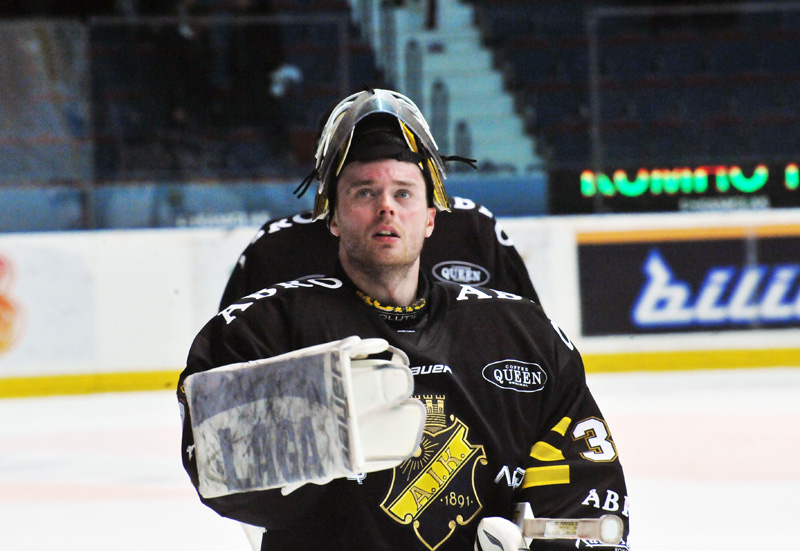
- Daniel Larsson with AIK in February 2013
- Born: February 7, 1986 (age 40) Boden, SWE
- Height: 6 ft 0 in (183 cm)
- Weight: 181 lb (82 kg; 12 st 13 lb)
- Position: Goaltender
- Caught: Left
- Played for: Djurgårdens IF; Grand Rapids Griffins; HV71; AIK IF; Luleå HF
- NHL draft: 92nd overall, 2006; Detroit Red Wings
- Playing career: 2006–2016

Daniel Larsson (born February 7, 1986) is a Swedish former professional ice hockey goaltender, who played in the Swedish Hockey League (SHL).

== Playing career ==
Larsson was selected 92nd overall in the third round of the 2006 NHL entry draft by the Detroit Red Wings.

He was playing as a goaltender for the Djurgårdens IF in the Elitserien, starting in 2006. On May 15, 2008, the Wings signed Larsson to a two-year entry-level contract. He was playing on the Grand Rapids Griffins being backup to Jimmy Howard. In his first season, he tied the Griffins franchise record for consecutive shutouts at two.

On May 19, 2010, Larsson signed with HV71 in the Swedish elite league Elitserien. On March 26, 2012, HV71 announced that it had parted ways with Larsson. Larsson then played with AIK between 2012 and 2014. In the 2016–17 season, Larsson signed a shortened deal with ERC Ingolstadt of the Deutsche Eishockey Liga, however failed to appear in a game with the club before his release at seasons end on March 11, 2017.

== Awards ==
- Elitserien Rookie of the year in 2008.
- Awarded Honken Trophy in 2008.
