= 2010–11 Elitserien season =

- League: Elitserien
- Sport: Ice hockey
- Duration: 16 September 2010 – 5 March 2011
- Total attendance: 2,032,841 (reg. season)
- Average attendance: 6,160 (reg. season)

Regular season
- League champion: HV71
- Season MVP: Viktor Fasth (AIK)
- Top scorer: Joakim Lindström (Skellefteå AIK)

Playoffs
- Playoffs MVP: Anders Bastiansen (Färjestad BK)

Finals
- Champions: Färjestad BK
- Runners-up: Skellefteå AIK

SHL seasons
- ← 2009–10 2011–12 →

The 2010–11 Elitserien season was the 36th season of Elitserien. The regular season ran from 15 September 2010 to 5 March 2011, and the following playoffs ended on 14 April. HV71 won the regular season, scoring the game-winning empty net goal against Södertälje SK in the final round. Färjestads BK won the playoffs and thus became Swedish champions, beating Skellefteå AIK 4–1 in the finals. All of the local derby games between AIK and Djurgårdens IF were played in the Ericsson Globe.

On 26 December 2010, a game was held outdoors between Färjestads BK and Frölunda HC in Karlstad, continuing a tradition of outdoor games started in the previous season. Like last season, the home team won the game, this time in front of 15,274 spectators.

In Kvalserien, Modo Hockey requalified and Växjö Lakers HC qualified for the 2011–12 Elitserien season for the first time ever at the expense of Södertälje SK.

== Regular season ==
Magnus Johansson of the Linköpings HC scored the first goal of the season.

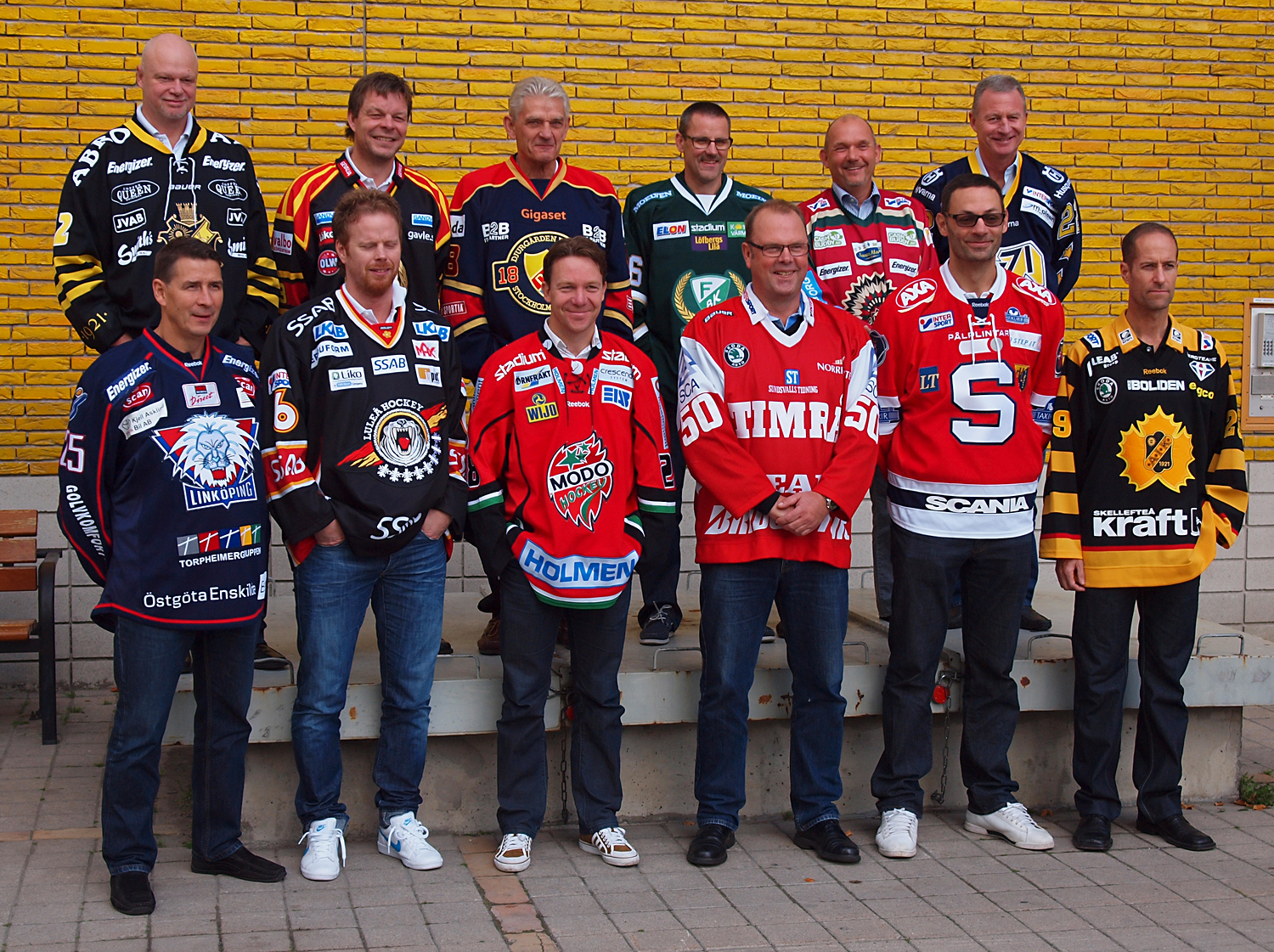
Head coaches of all Elitserien teams, September 2010.

=== Standings ===
2010–11 Elitserien season	GP	W	L	OTW/SOW	OTL/SOL	GF	GA	Pts
HV71^{y}	55	24	16	9	6	173	143	96
Färjestads BK^{x}	55	27	19	6	3	154	124	96
Skellefteå AIK^{x}	55	25	18	9	3	173	145	96
Luleå HF^{x}	55	23	21	8	3	129	115	88
Linköpings HC^{x}	55	22	19	5	9	138	118	85
Djurgårdens IF^{x}	55	22	19	4	10	140	139	84
Brynäs IF^{x}	55	19	20	8	8	147	157	81
AIK^{x}	55	20	23	4	8	131	151	76
Frölunda HC^{e}	55	19	24	5	7	128	158	74
Timrå IK^{e}	55	17	25	9	4	140	165	73
Södertälje SK^{r}	55	20	26	2	7	132	164	71
Modo Hockey^{r}	55	17	25	6	7	147	153	70

x – clinched playoff spot; y – clinched regular season league title; e – eliminated from playoff contention; r – will play in relegation series

=== Statistics ===
==== Scoring leaders ====
GP = Games played; G = Goals; A = Assists; Pts = Points; +/– = Plus/minus; PIM = Penalty minutes

Player	Team	GP	G	A	Pts	+/–	PIM
(Sweden) Joakim Lindström	Skellefteå AIK	54	28	32	60	+10	134
(Finland) Mikko Lehtonen	Skellefteå AIK	55	30	28	58	+1	34
(Sweden) David Rundblad	Skellefteå AIK	55	11	39	50	+6	14
(Sweden) Martin Thörnberg	HV71	52	25	19	44	+11	24
(Canada) Byron Ritchie	Modo Hockey	53	23	21	44	+6	72
(Sweden) Niklas Andersson	Frölunda HC	53	14	30	44	−15	30
(Sweden) Linus Videll	Södertälje SK	52	20	23	43	+4	10
(Norway) Per-Åge Skrøder	Modo Hockey	55	15	26	41	+2	64
(Sweden) Pär Arlbrandt	Luleå HF	55	19	21	40	+3	16
(Czech Republic) Jaroslav Hlinka	Linköpings HC	43	11	29	40	+13	12

==== Leading goaltenders ====
These are the leaders in GAA among goaltenders that have played at least 1200 minutes.

GP = Games played; TOI = Time on ice (minutes); GA = Goals against; SO = Shutouts; Sv% = Save percentage; GAA = Goals against average

Player	Team	GP	TOI	GA	SO	Sv%	GAA
(Sweden) Anders Nilsson	Luleå HF	31	1876:29	60	6	.918	1.92
(Czech Republic) Alexander Salák	Färjestads BK	32	1857:03	61	7	.926	1.97
(Finland) Fredrik Norrena	Linköpings HC	48	2916:56	103	6	.918	2.12
(Sweden) David Rautio	Luleå HF	24	1444:20	52	1	.904	2.16
(Sweden) Mark Owuya	Djurgårdens IF	32	1847:56	67	2	.927	2.18
(Sweden) Christopher Nihlstorp	Färjestads BK	23	1267:56	46	2	.923	2.18
(Sweden) Viktor Fasth	AIK	42	2473:11	93	2	.925	2.26
(Sweden) Niklas Svedberg	Brynäs IF	21	1260:48	48	2	.917	2.28
(Sweden) Daniel Larsson	HV71	45	2727:35	115	2	.917	2.53
(Sweden) Andreas Hadelöv	Skellefteå AIK	40	2398:54	101	2	.909	2.53

==== Attendance ====
#	Club	Home			Away			Total		
#	Club	GP	Total	Average	GP	Total	Average	GP	Total	Average
1	Frölunda HC	27	253,212	9,378	28	170,386	6,085	55	423,598	7,701
2	Djurgårdens IF	28	207,247	7,401	27	186,978	6,925	55	394,225	7,167
3	HV 71	27	184,924	6,849	28	164,515	5,875	55	349,439	6,353
4	Färjestads BK	27	183,193	6,784	28	168,253	6,009	55	351,446	6,389
5	Linköpings HC	28	186,946	6,676	27	156,818	5,808	55	343,764	6,250
6	MODO Hockey	27	167,247	6,194	28	177,610	6,343	55	344,857	6,270
7	Brynäs IF	28	159,137	5,683	27	165,475	6,128	55	324,612	5,902
8	AIK	27	151,596	5,614	28	186,214	6,650	55	337,810	6,142
9	Luleå HF	27	141,107	5,226	28	172,922	6,175	55	314,029	5,709
10	Timrå IK	28	139,949	4,998	27	156,800	5,807	55	296,749	5,395
11	Skellefteå AIK	28	139,827	4,993	27	167,413	6,200	55	307,240	5,586
12	Södertälje SK	28	118,456	4,230	27	159,457	5,905	55	277,913	5,052
League		330	2,032,841	6,160						

== Playoffs ==
The standard of eight teams qualify for the playoffs. HV71 won the regular season title for the second consecutive season with 96 points.

1. HV71 – Regular season champions, 96 points (+30 goal difference, 173 goals for)
2. Färjestads BK – 96 points (+30 goal difference, 154 goals for)
3. Skellefteå AIK – 96 points (+28 goal difference)
4. Luleå HF – 88 points
5. Linköpings HC – 85 points
6. Djurgårdens IF – 84 points
7. Brynäs IF – 81 points
8. AIK – 76 points

=== Playoff bracket ===
In the first round, the highest remaining seed chose which of the four lowest remaining seeds to be matched against. In the second round, the highest remaining seed is matched against the lowest remaining seed. In each round the higher-seeded team is awarded home ice advantage. Each best-of-seven series follows an alternating home team format: the higher-seeded team will play at home for games 1 and 3 (plus 5 and 7 if necessary), and the lower-seeded team will be at home for game 2, 4 and 6 (if necessary).

Quarterfinals
1	HV71	0
8	AIK	4
2	Färjestads BK	4
7	Brynäs IF	1
(Pairings are reseeded after the first round)
3	Skellefteå AIK	4
5	Linköpings HC	3
4	Luleå HF	4
6	Djurgårdens IF	3

Semifinals
2	Färjestads BK	4
8	AIK	0
3	Skellefteå AIK	4
4	Luleå HF	2

Finals
2	Färjestads BK	4
3	Skellefteå AIK	1

=== Quarterfinals ===
==== (1) HV71 vs. (8) AIK ====
March 7	HV71	2–4	AIK	Kinnarps Arena	Recap

March 9	AIK	3–0	HV71	Hovet	Recap

March 11	HV71	1–3	AIK	Kinnarps Arena	Recap

March 15	AIK	4–1	HV71	Hovet	Recap

AIK won series 4–0

==== (2) Färjestads BK vs. (7) Brynäs IF ====
March 8	Färjestads BK	7–3	Brynäs IF	Löfbergs Lila Arena	Recap

March 10	Brynäs IF	2–3	OT	Färjestads BK	Läkerol Arena	Recap

March 12	Färjestads BK	3–4	OT	Brynäs IF	Löfbergs Lila Arena	Recap

March 14	Brynäs IF	1–2	Färjestads BK	Läkerol Arena	Recap

March 16	Färjestads BK	4–3	Brynäs IF	Löfbergs Lila Arena	Recap

Färjestads BK won series 4–1

==== (3) Skellefteå AIK vs. (5) Linköpings HC ====
March 8	Skellefteå AIK	4–3	OT	Linköpings HC	Skellefteå Kraft Arena	Recap

March 10	Linköpings HC	5–1	Skellefteå AIK	Cloetta Center	Recap

March 12	Skellefteå AIK	3–4	OT	Linköpings HC	Skellefteå Kraft Arena	Recap

March 14	Linköpings HC	0–1	Skellefteå AIK	Cloetta Center	Recap

March 16	Skellefteå AIK	3–1	Linköpings HC	Skellefteå Kraft Arena	Recap

March 18	Linköpings HC	4–2	Skellefteå AIK	Cloetta Center	Recap

March 20	Skellefteå AIK	3–2	Linköpings HC	Skellefteå Kraft Arena	Recap

Skellefteå AIK won series 4–3

==== (4) Luleå HF vs. (6) Djurgårdens IF ====
March 8	Luleå HF	2–1	OT	Djurgårdens IF	Coop Norrbotten Arena	Recap

March 10	Djurgårdens IF	1–2	Luleå HF	Hovet	Recap

March 12	Luleå HF	3–1	Djurgårdens IF	Coop Norrbotten Arena	Recap

March 14	Djurgårdens IF	4–2	Luleå HF	Hovet	Recap

March 16	Luleå HF	0–2	Djurgårdens IF	Coop Norrbotten Arena	Recap

March 18	Djurgårdens IF	2–0	Luleå HF	Hovet	Recap

March 20	Luleå HF	4–3	OT	Djurgårdens IF	Coop Norrbotten Arena	Recap

Luleå HF won series 4–3

- Note: Game 6 was played in the Ericsson Globe.

=== Semifinals ===
==== (2) Färjestads BK vs. (8) AIK ====
March 22	Färjestads BK	2–1	AIK	Löfbergs Lila Arena	Recap

March 24	AIK	2–4	Färjestads BK	Hovet	Recap

March 26	Färjestads BK	4–2	AIK	Löfbergs Lila Arena	Recap

March 27	AIK	1–2	Färjestads BK	Hovet	Recap

Färjestads BK won series 4–0

- Note: Game 4 was played in the Ericsson Globe.

==== (3) Skellefteå AIK vs. (4) Luleå HF ====
March 22	Skellefteå AIK	3–4	OT	Luleå HF	Skellefteå Kraft Arena	Recap

March 24	Luleå HF	4–3	OT	Skellefteå AIK	Coop Norrbotten Arena	Recap

March 26	Skellefteå AIK	2–1	OT	Luleå HF	Skellefteå Kraft Arena	Recap

March 27	Luleå HF	1–2	OT	Skellefteå AIK	Coop Norrbotten Arena	Recap

March 29	Skellefteå AIK	2–0	Luleå HF	Skellefteå Kraft Arena	Recap

March 31	Luleå HF	3–4	Skellefteå AIK	Coop Norrbotten Arena	Recap

Skellefteå AIK won series 4–2

=== Finals ===
==== (2) Färjestads BK vs. (3) Skellefteå AIK ====
April 5	Färjestads BK	5–4	Skellefteå AIK	Löfbergs Lila Arena	Recap

April 7	Skellefteå AIK	3–2	OT	Färjestads BK	Skellefteå Kraft Arena	Recap

April 9	Färjestads BK	5–3	Skellefteå AIK	Löfbergs Lila Arena	Recap

April 12	Skellefteå AIK	1–2	OT	Färjestads BK	Skellefteå Kraft Arena	Recap

April 14	Färjestads BK	4–1	Skellefteå AIK	Löfbergs Lila Arena	Recap

Färjestads BK won series 4–1

=== Playoff statistics ===
==== Playoff scoring leaders ====
Player	Team	GP	G	A	Pts	PIM
(Sweden) Mikael Johansson	Färjestads BK	14	5	8	13	2
(Sweden) Rickard Wallin	Färjestads BK	14	4	9	13	12
(Sweden) Erik Forssell	Skellefteå AIK	18	7	5	12	4
(Sweden) Jimmie Ericsson	Skellefteå AIK	18	6	5	11	20
(Sweden) Christian Söderström	Skellefteå AIK	18	5	6	11	4
(Sweden) Joakim Lindström	Skellefteå AIK	18	4	7	11	16
(Sweden) Per Åslund	Färjestads BK	14	5	5	10	16
(Sweden) Dick Axelsson	Färjestads BK	14	4	6	10	24
(Sweden) Magnus Nygren	Färjestads BK	14	3	7	10	6
(Sweden) David Rundblad	Skellefteå AIK	18	3	7	10	20

==== Playoff leading goaltenders ====
Player	Team	GP	TOI	SOG	GA	SO	SV%	GAA
(Sweden) Cristopher Nihlstorp	Färjestads BK	5	338:30	162	9	0	.944	1.60
(Sweden) Mark Owuya	Djurgårdens IF	7	433:28	181	12	2	.934	1.66
(Sweden) Viktor Fasth	AIK	8	472:29	254	14	1	.945	1.78
(Sweden) Anders Nilsson	Luleå HF	13	826:42	391	27	0	.931	1.96
(Czech Republic) Alexander Salák	Färjestads BK	9	562:13	230	22	0	.904	2.35

== Elitserien awards ==
Guldhjälmen: Magnus Johansson, Linköpings HC
Guldpucken: Viktor Fasth, AIK
Honken Trophy: Viktor Fasth, AIK
Håkan Loob Trophy: Mikko Lehtonen, Skellefteå AIK
Rookie of the Year: Mattias Ekholm, Brynäs IF
Salming Trophy: David Rundblad, Skellefteå AIK
Playoff MVP (later renamed the Stefan Liv Memorial Trophy): Anders Bastiansen, Färjestads BK
Guldpipan: Ulf Rönnmark

== Rule changes ==
New rule changes include:

- For this season, a team receiving a penalty shot had to use the player fouled to perform the shot. Previously, the team could choose any player to take the shot.
- A player on the ice must be within 1.5 metres of the bench before his replacement could step on the ice.
- A player losing his helmet during play must leave the ice immediately.
- When a team with a player already in the penalty box has a delayed penalty and the opposing team scores, the player already in the box will exit and the player with the delayed penalty will serve his penalty. Previously, the goal would negate the delayed penalty.
- A goal scored with the shaft of the stick would stand, even were the stick blade above the crossbar.
- The number of non-players allowed in the bench area was increased from six to eight.
- For the first time since the 2004–2005 season, the 2010–2011 season re-introduced shootout in regulation games. Games tied after the first 60 minutes went to a 5-minute overtime period, and to a shootout if no goals were scored in the overtime. If the teams scored equally with three penalty shots, a sudden-death shootout would result: if the first team scored, the second team would lose unless it could score in its next shot. The player who gave his team the winning lead in the shootout was awarded a goal point in the protocol. The first game to go into a shootout was in round 3, a Timrå IK victory over Luleå HF.
