= Games of the 2010–11 Elitserien season =

Abbreviations
PP1	= Powerplay (the team who scored the goal had one more player on the ice than the opponents)
PP2	= Powerplay (the team who scored the goal had two more players on the ice than the opponents)
SH1	= Boxplay (the team who scored the goal had one player less than the opponents)
SH2	= Boxplay (the team who scored the goal had two players less than the opponents)
ENG	= Empty net goal
OT	= Overtime
SO or	= Shootout
GK out	= The team who scored the goal had their goaltender out at the time

All games can be found at Hockeyligan.se.

All times are local (CEST and CET).

== Round 1 ==
September 15, 2010; 19:00	AIK	1 – 5 (0–1, 1–1, 0–3)	Linköpings HC	Hovet; Attendance: 6,823

Game reference

Christopher Heino-Lindberg
Goalies
Fredrik Norrena
Referees:
Pehr Claesson
Morgan Johansson

	0–1	20:00 Magnus Johansson (P. Zackrisson, J. Andersson)
Richard Gynge (Oscar Steen, Jonas Liwing) 20:44	1–1
	1–2	28:11 Pontus Petterström (S. Karlsson, M. Johansson)
	1–3	42:56 Matt Murley (Niclas Hävelid, Fredrik Norrena)
	1–4	50:46 Jari Tolsa (Robin Persson, Magnus Johansson)
	1–5	54:18 Martin Laumann Ylvén (Jari Tolsa, Magnus Johansson)

8 min
Penalties
6 min
17
Shots
37

September 16, 2010; 19:00	Skellefteå AIK	2 – 3 (0–0, 1–2, 1–1)	Färjestads BK	Skellefteå Kraft Arena; Attendance: 5,831

Game reference

Andreas Hadelöv
Goalies
Christopher Nihlstorp
Referees:
Ulf Rönnmark
Niklas Lovefall

	0–1	22:53 Emil Kåberg (Robin Sterner)
Fredrik Warg (Joakim Lindström) 23:14	1–1
	1–2	33:54 Pelle Prestberg (Jonas Junland, Christian Berglund)
	1–3	55:33 Sanny Lindström
Pierre-Edouard Bellemare (J. Forsberg, Y. Hagos) 57:20	2–3

8 min
Penalties
20 min
50
Shots
18

September 16, 2010; 19:00	Brynäs IF	0 – 2 (0–1, 0–1, 0–0)	Modo Hockey	Läkerol Arena; Attendance: 6,225

Game reference
Björn Bjurling	Goalies	Tuomas Tarkki	Referees: Christer Lärking; Wolmer Edqvist
0–1 / 10:41 Nicklas Danielsson (Per-Åge Skröder, Charlie Cook); 0–2 / 27:26 Morten Madsen (Byron Ritchie, Mattias Timander)			Referees: Christer Lärking; Wolmer Edqvist
4 min	Penalties	6 min	Referees: Christer Lärking; Wolmer Edqvist
24	Shots	17	Referees: Christer Lärking; Wolmer Edqvist

September 16, 2010; 19:00	Djurgårdens IF	3 – 2 (1–0, 0–1, 2–1)	HV71	Hovet; Attendance: 7,246

Game reference

Stefan Ridderwall
Goalies
Daniel Larsson
Referees:
Thomas Andersson
Daniel Winge

Mathias Tjärnqvist (A. Holmqvist, J. Boumedienne) 03:42	1–0
	1–1	37:59 Martin Thörnberg (Jukka Voutilainen, Daniel Grillfors)
	1–2	48:54 Kris Beech (Jukka Voutilainen, Pasi Puistola)
John Norman (Andreas Holmqvist) 54:14	2–2
Mathias Tjärnqvist (Oscar Eklund, John Norman) 54:36	3–2

37 min
Penalties
12 min
29
Shots
32

September 16, 2010; 19:00	Södertälje SK	1 – 3 (1–1, 0–1, 0–1)	Luleå HF	AXA Sports Center; Attendance: 4,414

Game reference

Riku Helenius
Goalies
David Rautio
Referees:
Sören Persson
Mikael Nord

Martin Chabada (Lukas Kilström) 03:27	1–0
	1–1	07:55 Janne Niinimaa (Pär Arlbrandt, Mats Lavander) (PP1)
	1–2	21:53 Pierre Johnsson (Sebastian Enterfeldt)
	1–3	43:26 Thomas Raffl (Janne Niinimaa, Cam Abbott)

8 min
Penalties
2 min
16
Shots
11

September 17, 2010; 21:00	Timrå IK	6 – 2 (2–0, 2–1, 2–1)	Frölunda HC	E.ON Arena; Attendance: 5,208

Game reference

Magnus Åkerlund
Goalies
Johan Holmqvist
Referees:
Pehr Claesson
Morgan Johansson

Mikko Jokela (Timo Pärssinen, Kim Hirschovits) 01:09	1–0
Anton Axelsson (Robin Lindqvist, Mattias Karlsson) 18:26	2–0
Per Hallin (Martin Röymark, Anton Lander) 26:12	3–0
Timo Pärssinen (Sebastian Erixon, Jeremy Boyce) 35:31	4–0
	4–1	39:59 Henrik Tömmernäs (Niklas Andersson, Riku Hahl)
Sebastian Erixon 42:07	5–1
	5–2	55:41 Tomi Kallio (Tobias Viklund, Niklas Andersson)
Sebastian Erixon (Anton Lander) (SH1, ENG) 56:33	6–2

18 min
Penalties
16 min
28
Shots
35

== Round 2 ==
September 18, 2010; 16:00	Södertälje SK	2 – 3 (1–1, 1–0, 0–2)	Färjestads BK	AXA Sports Center; Attendance: 4,029

Game reference

Riku Helenius
Goalies
Christopher Nihlstorp
Referees:
Tobias Björk
Ulf Rönnmark

Ryan Lasch (Lukas Kilström) 03:19	1–0
	1–1	04:26 Dick Axelsson (Dragan Umicevic)
Linus Videll (Jonas Almtorp) 20:29	2–1
	2–2	43:53 Martin Sevc (Mattias Sjögren)
	2–3	47:38 Mikael Johansson (Dick Axelsson, Jonas Junland)

6 min
Penalties
8 min
30
Shots
24

September 18, 2010; 16:00	HV71	5 – 4 (OT) (1–1, 0–1, 3–2, 1–0)	Brynäs IF	Kinnarps Arena; Attendance: 6,708

Game reference

Daniel Larsson
Goalies
Björn Bjurling
Referees:
Sören Persson
Mikael Nord

Martin Thörnberg (Johan Davidsson) 02:30	1–0
	1–1	13:32 Eero Somervuori (Jonas Nordquist, Lars Jonsson)
	1–2	23:46 Mads Hansen (Jörgen Sundqvist, Emil Sandin)
	1–3	41:30 Magnus Kahnberg (Dale Clarke)
Jukka Voutilainen (Martin Thörnberg) 42:58	2–3
Johan Davidsson (Jukka Voutilainen, Juuso Hietanen) 50:49	3–3
	3–4	51:22 Calle Järnkrok (Anton Rödin, Sebastian Lauritzen)
Johan Lindström 55:56	4–4
Juuso Hietanen (A. Almqvist, F. Bremberg) (OT, PP1) 60:50	5–4

2 min
Penalties
10 min
33
Shots
26

September 18, 2010; 18:30	Modo Hockey	3 – 2 (1–0, 2–0, 0–2)	Djurgårdens IF	Fjällräven Center; Attendance: 6,532

Game reference

Tuomas Tarkki
Goalies
Stefan Ridderwall
Referees:
Thomas Forsström
Niclas Johansson

Niko Dimitrakos (Charlie Cook, Morten Madsen) (PP1) 10:04	1–0
Nicklas Danielsson (Niklas Sundström, Per-Åge Skröder) 21:02	2–0
Per Svartvadet 22:07	3–0
	3–1	52:26 Christian Eklund (Oscar Eklund, Mathias Tjärnqvist)
	3–2	59:00 Andreas Holmqvist (Kristofer Ottosson, Daniel Widing)

14 min
Penalties
12 min
25
Shots
30

September 18, 2010; 18:30	Luleå HF	5 – 3 (3–0, 0–3, 2–0)	Skellefteå AIK	Coop Norrbotten Arena; Attendance: 6,251

Game reference

Anders Nilsson
Goalies
Joakim Eriksson
Referees:
Thomas Andersson
Patrik Sjöberg

Mats Lavander (Niklas Olausson, Elias Fälth) 02:10	1–0
Pär Arlbrandt (Niklas Olausson, Mats Lavander) (PP2) 09:24	2–0
Cam Abbott (Chris Abbott, Janne Niinimaa) (PP1) 14:44	3–0
	3–1	23:36 Joakim Lindström (Adam Larsson)
	3–2	25:00 Pierre-Edouard Bellemare (Johan Forsberg, David Rundblad)
	3–3	27:28 Mikko Lehtonen (Fredrik Warg)
Cam Abbott (Janne Niinimaa, Chris Abbott) 48:08	4–3
Joonas Vihko (Cam Abbott, Janne Niinimaa) 52:51	5–3

8 min
Penalties
16 min
36
Shots
21

September 21, 2010; 19:00	Frölunda HC	0 – 1 (OT) (0–0, 0–0, 0–0, 0–1)	AIK	Scandinavium; Attendance: 9,198

Game reference
Johan Holmqvist	Goalies	Viktor Fasth	Referees: Mikael Sjöqvist; Wolmer Edqvist
0–1 / 62:57 Johan Andersson (P. Nemeth, J. Salmonsson) (OT)			Referees: Mikael Sjöqvist; Wolmer Edqvist
4 min	Penalties	12 min	Referees: Mikael Sjöqvist; Wolmer Edqvist
42	Shots	14	Referees: Mikael Sjöqvist; Wolmer Edqvist

September 21, 2010; 19:00	Linköpings HC	5 – 2 (1–1, 2–0, 2–1)	Timrå IK	Cloetta Center; Attendance: 6,463

Game reference

Fredrik Norrena
Goalies
Magnus Åkerlund
Referees:
Tomas Andersson
Sören Persson

	0–1	10:11 Robin Lindqvist (Anton Axelsson, Antti Halonen)
Matt Murley (Erik Lindhagen, Magnus Johansson) 17:20	1–1
Niclas Hävelid (P. Zackrisson, M. Johansson) (PP2) 28:17	2–1
Patrik Zackrisson (A. Jämtin, M. Håkanson) (PP1) 30:53	3–1
Matt Murley (Viktor Ekbom, Robin Persson) 49:27	4–1
	4–2	58:57 Timo Pärssinen (Gabriel Karlsson)
Johan Andersson (Andreas Molinder, Matt Murley) (ENG) 59:54	5–2

10 min
Penalties
16 min
39
Shots
16

== Round 3 ==
September 23, 2010; 19:00	Skellefteå AIK	4 – 1 (1–0, 2–1, 1–0)	Modo Hockey	Skellefteå Kraft Arena; Attendance: 4,475

Game reference

Andreas Hadelöv
Goalies
Tuomas Tarkki
Referee:
Sören Persson

Pierre-Edouard Bellemare (J. Forsberg, Y. Hagos) 04:21	1–0
	1–1	21:31 Niko Dimitrakos (Morten Madsen)
Mikko Lehtonen (Erik Forssell) 24:38	2–1
Johan Forsberg (A. Larsson, P-E. Bellemare) (PP1) 36:30	3–1
Fredrik Lindgren (Anders Söderberg, Martin Lundberg) 42:04	4–1

6 min
Penalties
10 min
34
Shots
31

September 23, 2010; 19:00	Timrå IK	2 – 1 (SO) (0–0, 1–0, 0–1, 0–0, 1–0)	Luleå HF	E.ON Arena; Attendance: 4,707

Game reference

Magnus Åkerlund
Goalies
Anders Nilsson
Referee:
Ulf Rönnmark

Gabriel Karlsson (Björn Svensson) 27:16	1–0
	1–1	40:30 Pär Arlbrandt (S. Hjalmarsson, N. Olausson) (PP1)
Martin Röymark (SO)	2–1

8 min
Penalties
10 min
19
Shots
23

September 23, 2010; 19:00	Brynäs IF	4 – 2 (1–1, 2–1, 1–0)	Djurgårdens IF	Läkerol Arena; Attendance: 5,381

Game reference

Björn Bjurling
Goalies
Mark Owuya
Referee:
Pehr Claesson

Lars Jonsson (Calle Järnkrok, Anton Rödin) (PP1) 05:55	1–0
	1–1	07:49 Nils Ekman (Mathias Tjärnqvist)
	1–2	24:00 Oscar Eklund (Daniel Widing, Jimmie Ölvestad)
Jonathan Granström (Sebastian Wennström, Johan Larsson) 25:36	2–2
Andreas Dackell (Eero Somervuori, Jonas Nordquist) 29:26	3–2
Mads Hansen (Sebastian Lauritzen, Simon Löf) 43:19	4–2

4 min
Penalties
12 min
21
Shots
20

September 23, 2010; 19:00	AIK	4 – 5 (OT) (1–1, 2–2, 1–1, 0–1)	Södertälje SK	Hovet; Attendance: 3,471

Game reference

Referee:
Patrik Sjöberg

	0–1	03:31 Linus Videll (Jonas Almtorp)
Filip Olsson (Mattias Beck, David Engblom) 10:04	1–1
Johannes Salmonsson (Johan Andersson) 26:20	2–1
	2–2	28:27 Fredric Andersson (J. Jacobsen, A. Lagerström)
Victor Ahlström (Mattias Beck, Mikael Österberg) 30:53	3–2
	3–3	31:25 Joakim Eriksson (Ryan Lasch, Mattias Carlsson)
43:33 Johan Andersson	4–3
	4–4	58:31 Mattias Carlsson (Ryan Lasch, Jonas Almtorp) (PP1)
	4–5	61:24 (OT) Mattias Carlsson (Ryan Lasch, Jonas Almtorp)

8 min
Penalties
8 min
31
Shots
35

September 23, 2010; 19:00	Färjestads BK	2 – 3 (1–1, 0–1, 1–1)	Frölunda HC	Löfbergs Lila Arena; Attendance: 7,410

Game reference

Christopher Nihlstorp
Goalies
Johan Holmqvist
Referee:
Thomas Andersson

	0–1	04:22 Carl Klingberg (Mikko Mäenpää, Joel Lundqvist)
Dick Axelsson (Dragan Umicevic) 17:09	1–1
	1–2	28:26 Niklas Andersson (Richard Demén-Willaume, Tomi Kallio)
	1–3	50:17 Mikko Mäenpää (Riku Hahl, Mika Pyörälä)
Pelle Prestberg (Emil Kåberg, Christian Berglund) 59:25	2–3

4 min
Penalties
33 min
29
Shots
25

September 23, 2010; 19:00	HV71	2 – 1 (OT) (0–0, 0–0, 1–1, 1–0)	Linköpings HC	Kinnarps Arena; Attendance: 6,548

Game reference
Daniel Larsson	Goalies	Fredrik Norrena	Referee: Morgan Johansson
Johan Davidsson (Juuso Hietanen) 59:54; Martin Thörnberg (J. Voutilainen, J. Hietanen) (PP1, OT) 63:24 / Goals / 44:10 Andreas Pihl (Erik Lindhagen)			Referee: Morgan Johansson
4 min	Penalties	12 min	Referee: Morgan Johansson
30	Shots	16	Referee: Morgan Johansson

== Round 4 ==
September 25, 2010; 16:00	Södertälje SK	1 – 3 (0–1, 1–0, 0–2)	Timrå IK	AXA Sports Center; Attendance: 3,831

Game reference

Riku Helenius
Goalies
Juha Pitkämäki
Referees:
David Bergman
Christer Lärking

	0–1	02:25 Jeremy Boyce-Rotevall (A. Axelsson, A. Valdix)
Patrik Carlsson (Stefan Bemström, Lukas Kilström) 22:24	1–1
	1–2	51:05 Antti Halonen (Fredrik Hynning, Gabriel Karlsson)
	1–3	59:59 Timo Pärssinen (Anton Lander, Mikko Jokela) (ENG)

8 min
Penalties
12 min
33
Shots
25

September 25, 2010; 16:00	Linköpings HC	3 – 2 (SO) (1–0, 1–1, 0–1, 0–0, 1–0)	Modo Hockey	Cloetta Center; Attendance: 6,926

Game reference

Fredrik Norrena
Goalies
Nicklas Dahlberg
Referees:
Pehr Claesson
Niklas Lovefall

Andreas Jämtin (Erik Andersson, Mikael Håkanson) 08:44	1–0
	1–1	32:41 Robert Rosén (Mattias Timander) (PP1)
Erik Lindhagen (Andreas Molinder, Matt Murley) 37:24	2–1
	2–2	51:24 Niklas Sundström (Per-Åge Skröder, Charlie Cook)
Johan Andersson (SO) 65:00	3–2

12 min
Penalties
12 min
37
Shots
28

September 25, 2010; 16:00	Frölunda HC	4 – 3 (SO) (1–0, 2–1, 0–2, 0–0, 1–0)	Brynäs IF	Scandinavium; Attendance: 9,043

Game reference

Johan Holmqvist
Goalies
Niklas Svedberg
Referees:
Wolmer Edqvist
Morgan Johansson

Mika Pyörälä (Toni Koivisto, Riku Hahl) (PP1) 13:19	1–0
Tomi Kallio (Niklas Andersson) 23:55	2–0
	2–1	24:49 Eero Somervuori (Andreas Dackell, Dale Clarke) (PP1)
Niklas Andersson (Oscar Hedman, Tomi Kallio) (PP1) 28:33	3–1
	3–2	56:30 Jakob Silfverberg (Lars Jonsson, Calle Järnkrok) (PP1)
	3–3	59:03 Calle Järnkrok (Jonathan Granström, Jakob Silfverberg)
William Wallén (SO) 65:00	4–3

10 min
Penalties
14 min
37
Shots
23

September 25, 2010; 18:30	Luleå HF	3 – 2 (0–2, 1–0, 2–0)	HV71	Coop Norrbotten Arena; Attendance: 5,255

Game reference

David Rautio
Goalies
Daniel Larsson
Referees:
Thomas Forsström
Sören Persson

	0–1	14:36 Martin Thörnberg (J. Voutilainen, J. Davidsson) (PP1)
	0–2	17:22 Jukka Voutilainen (Martin Thörnberg, Juuso Hietanen)
Pär Arlbrandt 28:08	1–2
Pär Arlbrandt (Niklas Olausson, Mats Lavander) (PP1) 46:27	2–2
Mats Lavander (Simon Hjalmarsson, Pär Arlbrandt) (PP1) 50:44	3–2

14 min
Penalties
18 min
34
Shots
26

September 25, 2010; 18:30	Färjestads BK	3 – 0 (0–0, 1–0, 2–0)	AIK	Löfbergs Lila Arena; Attendance: 6,958

Game reference

Alexander Salak
Goalies
Christopher Heino-Lindberg
Referees:
Niclas Johansson
Mikael Nord

Christian Berglund (Pelle Prestberg, Rickard Wallin) 20:27	1–0
Per Åslund (Patrik Lundh, Mattias Sjögren) 46:11	2–0
Mattias Sjögren (S. Lindström, J. Frögren) (SH1, ENG) 58:22	3–0

8 min
Penalties
12 min
45
Shots
17

September 25, 2010; 18:30	Djurgårdens IF	2 – 3 (SO) (1–1, 0–0, 1–1, 0–0, 0–1)	Skellefteå AIK	Hovet; Attendance: 6,898

Game reference

Stefan Ridderwall
Goalies
Andreas Hadelöv
Referees:
Mikael Sjöqvist
Thomas Andersson

Daniel Widing (K. Ottosson, J. Ölvestad) (PP1) 06:03	1–0
	1–1	09:40 Fredrik Warg (Joakim Lindström)
	1–2	43:35 Fredrik Warg (Pavel Skrbek, Mikko Lehtonen) (PP1)
Patrick Cehlin (John Norman, Marcus Krüger) 45:20	2–2
	2–3	65:00 Joakim Lindström (SO)

8 min
Penalties
8 min
25
Shots
31

== Round 5 ==
September 30, 2010; 19:00	Skellefteå AIK	3 – 2 (0–0, 3–1, 0–1)	AIK	Skellefteå Kraft Arena; Attendance: 4,708

Game reference

Andreas Hadelöv
Goalies
Christopher Heino-Lindberg
Referee:
Patrik Sjöberg

Mikko Lehtonen (Fredrik Lindgren, Joakim Lindström) 29:49	1–0
Mikko Lehtonen (Ivan Majesky) 36:24	2–0
	2–1	36:43 Victor Ahlström (Oscar Ahlström, Peter Nolander)
David Rundblad (Fredrik Warg, Joakim Lindström) 39:19	3–1
	3–2	49:13 Oscar Steen (Daniel Rudslätt)

4 min
Penalties
6 min
28
Shots
18

September 30, 2010; 19:00	Modo Hockey	3 – 4 (SO) (2–2, 1–0, 0–1, 0–0, 0–1)	Timrå IK	Fjällräven Center; Attendance: 6,546

Game reference

Tuomas Tarkki
Goalies
Magnus Åkerlund
Referee:
Tomas Andersson

	0–1	01:20 Kim Hirschovits (Ilkka Pikkarainen, Timo Pärssinen)
	0–2	04:11 Fredrik Hynning (Björn Svensson, Mattias Karlsson)
Per Svartvadet (SH1) 07:56	1–2
Robert Rosén (Anton Hedman, Nicklas Danielsson) (PP1) 15:17	2–2
Robert Rosén (Per-Åge Skröder, Mattias Timander) (PP1) 36:20	3–2
	3–3	59:20 (PP1) Timo Pärssinen (Mattias Karlsson, Kim Hirschovits)
	3–4	65:00 (SO) Martin Röymark

38 min
Penalties
18 min
30
Shots
38

September 30, 2010; 19:00	Brynäs IF	2 – 3 (1–2, 1–1, 0–0)	Södertälje SK	Läkerol Arena; Attendance: 5,185

Game reference

Niklas Svedberg
Goalies
Pontus Sjögren
Referee:
Morgan Johansson

	0–1	08:59 Thom Flodqvist (Fredric Andersson, Arto Laatikainen)
	0–2	16:59 Linus Videll (Mattias Carlsson, Arto Laatikainen)
Jakob Silfverberg 18:54	1–2
	1–3	29:08 Patrik Carlsson (Blaz Gregorc, Joakim Eriksson)
Anton Rödin (Dale Clarke) 30:58	2–3

6 min
Penalties
12 min
41
Shots
29

September 30, 2010; 19:00	Djurgårdens IF	2 – 3 (0–1, 0–2, 2–0)	Luleå HF	Hovet; Attendance: 5,895

Game reference

Stefan Ridderwall
Goalies
Anders Nilsson
Referee:
Christer Lärking

	0–1	09:49 Anders Burström (Karl Fabricius, Simon Hjalmarsson)
	0–2	21:40 Topi Jaakola (Karl Fabricius, Anders Burström)
	0–3	38:03 Cam Abbott (Janne Niinimaa, Pär Arlbrandt)
Andreas Holmqvist (Mario Kempe, Tim Eriksson) 52:06	1–3
Josef Boumedienne (Stefan Ridderwall) 57:17	2–3

10 min
Penalties
10 min
24
Shots
28

September 30, 2010; 19:00	Färjestads BK	0 – 4 (0–1, 0–2, 0–1)	Linköpings HC	Löfbergs Lila Arena; Attendance: 5,465

Game reference

Cristopher Nihlstorp
Goalies
Fredrik Norrena
Referee:
Niclas Johansson

0–1	08:35 Erik Andersson (Erik Lindhagen)
0–2	28:44 Pontus Petterström (Erik Andersson)
0–3	09:46 Patrik Zackrisson (Klas Dahlbeck, Andreas Jämtin)
0–4	44:17 (PP1) Mikael Håkanson (Magnus Johansson)

12 min
Penalties
8 min
27
Shots
20

September 30, 2010; 19:00	HV71	2 – 1 (SO) (0–1, 0–0, 1–0, 0–0, 1–0)	Frölunda HC	Kinnarps Arena; Attendance: 6,853

Game reference

Daniel Larsson
Goalies
Joakim Lundström
Referee:
Ulf Rönnmark

	0–1	01:44 (PP1) Joel Lundqvist (Niklas Andersson, Tomi Kallio)
Jukka Voutilainen (M. Thörnberg, J. Davidsson) (PP2) 58:25	1–1
65:00 (SO) Martin Thörnberg	2–1

16 min
Penalties
30 min
41
Shots
19

== Round 6 ==
September 28, 2010; 19:00	AIK	5 – 2 (2–1, 2–1, 1–0)	Djurgårdens IF	Ericsson Globe; Attendance: 13,850

Game reference

Viktor Fasth
Goalies
Stefan Ridderwall
Referees:
Morgan Johansson
Sören Persson

Oscar Ahlström (Victor Ahlström, Patrik Nemeth) 02:17	1–0
Patric Blomdahl (Oscar Steen, Daniel Rudslätt) (PP1) 11:20	2–0
	2–1	11:44 Nils Ekman (Daniel Brodin)
	2–2	21:56 John Norman (Marcus Krüger, Patrick Cehlin)
Johan Andersson (R. Gynge, J. Salmonsson) 25:18	3–2
Johan Andersson 29:56	4–2
Oscar Steen (Christian Sandberg) 50:18	5–2

24 min
Penalties
10 min
23
Shots
28

October 2, 2010; 16:00	HV71	0 – 3 (0–1, 0–1, 0–1)	Timrå IK	Kinnarps Arena; Attendance: 6,867

Game reference

Daniel Larsson
Goalies
Juha Pitkämäki
Referees:
Wolmer Edqvist
Thomas Forsström

0–1	18:40 (PP1) Björn Svensson (Tomas Skogs, Fredrik Hynning)
0–2	29:19 (PP1) Mattias Karlsson (K. Hirschovits, I. Pikkarainen)
0–3	55:38 Timo Pärssinen (Kim Hirschovits)

18 min
Penalties
33 min
33
Shots
29

October 2, 2010; 16:00	Frölunda HC	1 – 2 (OT) (1–0, 0–0, 0–1, 0–1)	Södertälje SK	Scandinavium; Attendance: 10,105

Game reference

Joakim Lundström
Goalies
Pontus Sjögren
Referee:
Thomas Andersson

Toni Koivisto (Riku Hahl, Mika Pyörälä) 19:41	1–0
	1–1	40:46 Patrik Carlsson (Ryan Lasch)
	1–2	62:22 (OT) Linus Videll (Timo Seppänen, Patrik Carlsson)

4 min
Penalties
4 min
24
Shots
34

October 2, 2010; 16:00	Linköpings HC	2 – 1 (1–0, 1–0, 0–1)	Luleå HF	Cloetta Center; Attendance: 7,445

Game reference

Fredrik Norrena
Goalies
David Rautio
Referees:
Niclas Johansson
Mikael Nord

Niclas Hävelid (M. Johansson, P. Zackrisson) (PP2) 19:52	1–0
Sebastian Karlsson (Pontus Petterström, Robin Persson) 28:27	2–0
	2–1	44:55 (PP1) Mats Lavander (Pär Arlbrandt, Jan Sandström)

8 min
Penalties
8 min
21
Shots
25

October 2, 2010; 18:30	Skellefteå AIK	6 – 3 (3–2, 0–1, 3–0)	Brynäs IF	Skellefteå Kraft Arena; Attendance: 4,471

Game reference

Joacim Eriksson
Goalies
Björn Bjurling
Referees:
Christer Lärking
Niklas Lovefall

	0–1	00:26 (PP1) Eero Somervuori (Andreas Dackell, Dale Clarke)
Tim Erixon (Pierre-Edouard Bellemare, Johan Forsberg) 04:15	1–1
	1–2	04:48 Mattias Ekholm (Sebastian Lauritzen, Jonas Nordquist)
Tim Erixon (Mikko Lehtonen, David Rundblad) (PP1) 16:21	2–2
Christian Söderström 16:48	3–2
	3–3	25:29 Jonas Nordquist (Jörgen Sundqvist, Sebastian Lauritzen)
David Runblad (Joakim Lindström, Fredrik Warg) 51:07	4–3
Erik Forssell (Fredrik Lindgren, Jimmie Ericsson) 51:42	5–3
Mikko Lehtonen (Joakim Lindström) 58:24	6–3

10 min
Penalties
10 min
33
Shots
23

October 2, 2010; 18:30	Färjestads BK	2 – 1 (1–0, 0–0, 1–1)	Modo Hockey	Löfbergs Lila Arena; Attendance: 6,128

Game reference

Alexander Salak
Goalies
Tuomas Tarkki
Referees:
David Bergman
Patrik Sjöberg

Dragan Umicevic (Dick Axelsson, Mikael Johansson) 04:08	1–0
Rickard Wallin (Martin Sevc, Kristofer Berglund) (PP1) 44:06	2–0
	2–1	59:00 (PP1) Anton Hedman (N. Danielsson, M. Timander)

18 min
Penalties
10 min
22
Shots
28

== Round 7 ==
September 27, 2010; 19:00	Linköpings HC	4 – 0 (0–0, 2–0, 2–0)	Södertälje SK	Cloetta Center; Attendance: 5,812

Game reference

Fredrik Norrena
Goalies
Riku Helenius
Referees:
Pehr Claesson
Peter Sabelström

Mikael Håkanson (M. Johansson, N. Hävelid) (PP1) 22:36	1–0
Andreas Molinder (Matt Murley, Klas Dahlbeck) 37:33	2–0
Andreas Jämtin (Erik Andersson, Patrik Zackrisson) 53:38	3–0
Mikael Håkanson (P. Zackrisson, N. Hävelid) (PP1) 55:33	4–0

8 min
Penalties
6 min
17
Shots
21

October 5, 2010; 19:00	Luleå HF	1 – 0 (1–0, 0–0, 0–0)	AIK	Coop Norrbotten Arena; Attendance: 5,515

Game reference
Anders Nilsson	Goalies	Viktor Fasth	Referee: Pehr Claesson
Chris Abbott 08:30 / 1–0			Referee: Pehr Claesson
2 min	Penalties	10 min	Referee: Pehr Claesson
32	Shots	12	Referee: Pehr Claesson

October 5, 2010; 19:00	Brynäs IF	4 – 2 (3–0, 0–1, 1–1)	Färjestads BK	Läkerol Arena; Attendance: 4,584

Game reference

Niklas Svedberg
Goalies
Alexander Salak
Referee:
Thomas Forsström

Mattias Ekholm (Andreas Dackell, Jonathan Granström) 03:39	1–0
Calle Järnkrok (Eero Somervuori, Mattias Ekholm) 03:56	2–0
Calle Järnkrok (SH1) 05:52	3–0
	3–1	31:32 (SH1) Rickard Wallin
	3–2	40:10 Christian Berglund (Per Åslund, Martin Sevc)
Andreas Dackell (Mattias Ekholm) ENG 58:39	4–2

12 min
Penalties
8 min
18
Shots
30

October 5, 2010; 19:00	Djurgårdens IF	5 – 2 (1–2, 2–0, 2–0)	Timrå IK	Hovet; Attendance: 5,519

Game reference

Stefan Ridderwall
Goalies
Magnus Åkerlund
Referee:
Tomas Andersson

Andreas Holmqvist (Kristofer Ottosson) 03:56	1–0
	1–1	06:27 Daniel Corso (Björn Svensson, Fredrik Hynning)
	1–2	13:47 (PP1) Ilkka Pikkarainen (Timo Pärssinen, Kim Hirschovits)
Mathias Tjärnqvist (J. Boumedienne, K. Ottosson) (PP1) 25:06	2–2
Patrick Cehlin (Daniel Widing, Marcus Krüger) (PP1) 29:08	3–2
Jimmie Ölvestad 45:47	4–2
Oscar Eklund (Kristofer Ottosson) 56:46	5–2

10 min
Penalties
42 min
25
Shots
31

October 5, 2010; 19:00	HV71	2 – 1 (0–1, 1–0, 1–0)	Skellefteå AIK	Kinnarps Arena; Attendance: 6,626

Game reference

Daniel Larsson
Goalies
Andreas Hadelöv
Referee:
Morgan Johansson

	0–1	10:00 Joakim Lindström
Teemu Laine (Daniel Grillfors, Johan Lindström) 21:48	1–1
Juuso Hietanen (Johan Lindström, Kamil Piros) (PP1) 49:31	2–1

14 min
Penalties
10 min
31
Shots
35

October 5, 2010; 19:00	Modo Hockey	6 – 0 (1–0, 2–0, 3–0)	Frölunda HC	Fjällräven Center; Attendance: 5,539

Game reference

Tuomas Tarkki
Goalies
Joakim Lundström
Referee:
Wolmer Edqvist

Niklas Sundström (Nicklas Danielsson, Mattias Timander) 05:40	1–0
Robert Rosén (M. Häggström, A. Bonaksen) 22:53	2–0
Byron Ritchie (Morten Madsen) 34:34	3–0
Niko Dimitrakos (Byron Ritchie, Daniel Josefsson) (PP1) 41:55	4–0
Jacob Blomqvist (Robert Rosén) 50:31	5–0
Anton Hedman (Daniel Josefsson) 53:38	6–0

12 min
Penalties
14 min
28
Shots
21

== Round 8 ==
September 21, 2010; 19:00	Modo Hockey	2 – 5 (0–2, 1–2, 1–1)	Luleå HF	Fjällräven Center; Attendance: 5,310

Game reference

Tuomas Tarkki
Goalies
David Rautio
Referees:
Christer Lärking
Patrik Sjöberg

	0–1	12:34 Joonas Vihko (Chris Abbott)
	0–2	19:43 Niklas Olausson
	0–3	24:34 Chris Abbott (Joonas Vihko, Elias Fälth) (PP1)
Nicklas Danielsson (Per-Åge Skröder, Mattias Timander) 25:58	1–3
	1–4	37:23 Niklas Olausson (Janne Niinimaa)
Magnus Häggström (Per-Åge Skröder, Mattias Timander) 56:16	2–4
	2–5	58:02 Anders Burström (Jan Sandström) (ENG)

10 min
Penalties
6 min
27
Shots
19

October 7, 2010; 19:00	AIK	2 – 3 (0–1, 0–1, 2–1)	Brynäs IF	Hovet; Attendance: 3,936

Game reference

Referee:
Niclas Johansson

	0–1	09:47 (PP1) Dale Clarke (Anton Rödin, Jonas Nordquist)
	0–2	29:21 Jakob Silfverberg (Eero Somervuori)
Christian Sandberg (Johan Andersson, Josh MacNevin) (PP2) 45:14	1–2
	1–3	58:07 (ENG) Calle Järnkrok (Mattias Ekholm)
Oscar Steen (Jonas Liwing, Johan Andersson) 59:22	2–3

8 min
Penalties
18 min
38
Shots
29

October 7, 2010; 19:00	Frölunda HC	2 – 1 (SO) (0–1, 0–0, 1–0, 0–0, 1–0)	Linköpings HC	Scandinavium; Attendance: 7,501

Game reference

Johan Holmqvist
Goalies
Fredrik Norrena
Referee:
Sören Persson

	0–1	04:07 (PP1) Niclas Hävelid (Andreas Jämtin, Andreas Johansson)
Mikael Johansson (Niklas Andersson, Per-Johan Axelsson) 59:57	1–1
Mikael Johansson (SO) 65:00	2–1

4 min
Penalties
6 min
31
Shots
27

October 7, 2010; 19:00	Färjestads BK	4 – 1 (1–0, 1–1, 2–0)	HV71	Löfbergs Lila Arena; Attendance: 5,482

Game reference

Alexander Salak
Goalies
Daniel Larsson
Referee:
Thomas Andersson

Kristofer Berglund (Mikael Johansson, Pelle Prestberg) (PP2) 12:53	1–0
	1–1	21:53 (PP1) Daniel Rahimi (Kamil Piros, Adam Almqvist)
Patrik Lundh (Jonas Junland, Martin Sevc) (PP1) 35:18	2–1
Anders Bastiansen (Pelle Prestberg) 41:13	3–1
Rickard Wallin (Per Åslund, Jonas Junland) (ENG) 58:25	4–1

18 min
Penalties
24 min
25
Shots
38

October 7, 2010; 19:00	Södertälje SK	3 – 1 (1–0, 2–1, 0–0)	Djurgårdens IF	AXA Sports Center; Attendance: 4,744

Game reference

Pontus Sjögren
Goalies
Stefan Ridderwall
Referee:
Pehr Claesson

Jonas Almtorp (Martin Chabada, Stefan Bemström) 06:57	1–0
	1–1	25:56 (PP1) Marcus Nilsson (Josef Boumedienne, Andreas Holmqvist)
Linus Videll (Jonas Almtorp) (SH1) 29:23	2–1
Mattias Carlsson (Pekka Saarenheimo, Lukas Kilström) 35:07	3–1

8 min
Penalties
12 min
24
Shots
32

October 7, 2010; 19:00	Timrå IK	3 – 2 (0–0, 0–1, 3–1)	Skellefteå AIK	E.ON Arena; Attendance: 5,218

Game reference

Juha Pitkämäki
Goalies
Joacim Eriksson
Referee:
Christer Lärking

	0–1	30:36 Johan Forsberg (Fredrik Warg)
Daniel Corso (Fredrik Hynning, Sebastian Erixon) (PP1) 43:50	1–1
Sebastian Erixon (Kim Hirschovits, Timo Pärssinen) 48:40	2–1
	2–2	53:48 Erik Forssell
Ilkka Pikkarainen (Timo Pärssinen) 57:15	3–2

36 min
Penalties
22 min
27
Shots
27

== Round 9 ==
October 9, 2010; 16:00	Skellefteå AIK	3 – 1 (2–0, 0–0, 1–1)	Linköpings HC	Skellefteå Kraft Arena; Attendance: 5,069

Game reference

Andreas Hadelöv
Goalies
Fredrik Norrena
Referees:
Pehr Claesson
Morgan Johansson

Joakim Lindström (F. Lindgren, M. Lehtonen) (PP2) 08:13	1–0
Mikko Lehtonen (Fredrik Lindgren, David Rundblad) (PP1) 08:55	2–0
	2–1	44:01 (PP1) Jari Tolsa (Niclas Hävelid, Martin Laumann Ylvén)
Pierre-Edouard Bellemare (ENG) 59:06	3–1

12 min
Penalties
12 min
28
Shots
28

October 9, 2010; 16:00	Färjestads BK	1 – 2 (0–1, 0–1, 1–0)	Djurgårdens IF	Löfbergs Lila Arena; Attendance: 7,165

Game reference

Alexander Salak
Goalies
Mark Owuya
Referees:
Niclas Johansson
Patrik Sjöberg

	0–1	18:11 John Norman (Marcus Krüger, Patrik Cehlin)
	0–2	31:32 (PP1) Kristofer Ottosson (Josef Boumedienne)
Mikael Johansson (Emil Kåberg, Anders Bastiansen) 58:39	1–2

28 min
Penalties
8 min
34
Shots
17

October 9, 2010; 18:30	Brynäs IF	5 – 4 (OT) (3–2, 1–1, 0–1, 1–0)	Timrå IK	Läkerol Arena; Attendance: 7,361

Game reference

Niklas Svedberg
Goalies
Juha Pitkämäki
Referees:
Wolmer Edqvist
Mikael Sjöqvist

Mattias Ekholm (Magnus Kahnberg, Emil Sandin) 09:21	1–0
	1–1	10:20 Anton Lander (Daniel Corso, Fredrik Hynning)
Mattias Ekholm (Lars Jonsson, Andreas Dackell) (PP1) 16:34	2–1
	2–2	17:54 Daniel Corso (Fredrik Hynning, Elias Granat)
Jonathan Granström (Andreas Dackell, Anton Rödin) 19:40	3–2
Lars Jonsson (E. Somervuori, J. Granström) (PP1) 34:43	4–2
	4–3	37:07 Fredrik Sonntag (Sebastian Erixon, Alexander Larsson)
	4–4	46:00 Martin Röymark (Per Hallin, Elias Granat)
Mads Hansen (J. Sundqvist, S. Lauritzen) (OT) 62:59	5–4

12 min
Penalties
20 min
37
Shots
29

October 9, 2010; 18:30	HV71	3 – 2 (SO) (1–0, 1–1, 0–1, 0–0, 1–0)	AIK	Kinnarps Arena; Attendance: 6,953

Game reference

Daniel Larsson
Goalies
Viktor Fasth
Referees:
Sören Persson
Tobias Björk

Fredrik Bremberg (Daniel Rahimi, Teemu Laine) 02:17	1–0
	1–1	22:56 Mattias Beck
Juuso Hietanen (Jukka Voutilainen, Pasi Puistola) (PP1) 30:44	2–1
	2–2	59:08 Johannes Salmonsson (J. Andersson, C. Sandberg)
Teemu Laine (SO) 65:00	3–2

12 min
Penalties
10 min
35
Shots
35

October 9, 2010; 18:30	Modo Hockey	6 – 3 (2–0, 2–2, 2–1)	Södertälje SK	Fjällräven Center; Attendance: 5,842

Game reference

Tuomas Tarkki
Goalies
Pontus Sjögren
Referees:
Thomas Andersson
Mikael Nord

Kristian Forsberg (Jens Westin, Daniel Josefsson) 00:40	1–0
Nicklas Danielsson (Mattias Timander, Niklas Sundström) 05:42	2–0
Kristian Forsberg (Byron Ritchie, Morten Madsen) 24:32	3–0
Niklas Sundström (Ole-Kristian Tollefsen) 29:18	4–0
	4–1	09:51 Joakim Eriksson (Linus Videll, Timo Seppänen)
	4–2	35:26 Martin Chabada (Jonas Almtorp, Stefan Bemström)
Per-Åge Skröder (Niklas Sundström, Charlie Cook) (PP1) 43:13	5–2
	5–3	56:19 (PP1) Linus Videll (Arto Laatikainen, Joakim Eriksson)
Kristian Forsberg (M. Timander, B. Ritchie) (ENG) 58:03	6–3

8 min
Penalties
12 min
40
Shots
22

October 9, 2010; 18:30	Luleå HF	3 – 0 (0–0, 2–0, 1–0)	Frölunda HC	Coop Norrbotten Arena; Attendance: 5,721

Game reference

David Rautio
Goalies
Johan Holmqvist
Referees:
Christer Lärking
David Bergman

Joonas Vihko (Janne Niinimaa, Cam Abbott) 20:39	1–0
Joonas Vihko (Cam Abbott, Janne Niinimaa) (PP1) 26:02	2–0
Pär Arlbrandt (Niklas Olausson, Mats Lavander) (ENG) 58:10	3–0

4 min
Penalties
8 min
28
Shots
16

== Round 10 ==
October 12, 2010; 18:00	Linköpings HC	3 – 2 (SO) (0–2, 1–0, 1–0, 0–0, 1–0)	Djurgårdens IF	Cloetta Center; Attendance: 5,425

Game reference

Fredrik Norrena
Goalies
Mark Owuya
Referees:
Sören Persson
Niklas Lovefall

	0–1	09:46 Jimmie Ölvestad (Alexander Deilert, Marcus Nilson)
	0–2	18:37 (PP1) Mathias Tjärnqvist (Daniel Widing, Nils Ekman)
Mikael Håkansson (Andreas Jämtin, Niclas Hävelid) 33:00	1–2
Erik Lindhagen (Matt Murley, Andreas Molinder) 44:48 (PP1)	2–2
Erik Lindhagen (SO) 65:00	3–2

4 min
Penalties
10 min
46
Shots
23

October 14, 2010; 19:00	Luleå HF	7 – 4 (2–1, 2–2, 3–1)	Brynäs IF	Coop Norrbotten Arena; Attendance: 4,975

Game reference

Anders Nilsson
Goalies
Niklas Svedberg
Referees:
Wolmer Edqvist
Mikael Sjöqvist

Simon Hjalmarsson (Kim Karlsson) 10:10	1–0
Karl Fabricius (Thomas Raffl, Anders Burström) 14:38	2–0
	2–1	19:56 Lars Jonsson (Anton Rödin, Jakob Silfverberg)
	2–2	21:41 Eero Somervuori (Dale Clarke, Jakob Silfverberg)
	2–3	31:53 Jonathan Carlsson (Andreas Dackell, Calle Järnkrok)
Janne Niinimaa (S. Enterfeldt, S. Hjalmarsson) 36:01	3–3
Cam Abbott (Fredrik Styrman, Joonas Vihko) 39:07	4–3
	4–4	41:20 Calle Järnkrok (Dale Clarke)
Joonas Vihko (Elias Fälth, Chris Abbott) (PP1) 43:27	5–4
Mats Lavander (Niklas Olausson, Pär Arlbrandt) 52:49	6–4
Kim Karlsson (Sebastian Enterfeldt, Simon Hjalmarsson) 56:10	7–4

6 min
Penalties
10 min
30
Shots
20

October 14, 2010; 19:00	Timrå IK	2 – 3 (OT) (1–0, 0–1, 1–1, 0–1)	Färjestads BK	E.ON Arena; Attendance: 4,812

Game reference

Juha Pitkämäki
Goalies
Alexander Salak
Referees:
Ulf Rådbjer
Mikael Nord

Mattias Karlsson (Anton Axelsson, Alexander Larsson) 02:54	1–0
	1–1	30:39 (PP1) Christian Berglund (Anders Bastiansen)
Anton Lander (Anton Axelsson, Daniel Corso) 42:57	2–1
	2–2	49:15 (PP1) Mikael Johansson (R. Wallin, K. Berglund)
	2–3	64:28 (OT) Sanny Lindström (Mattias Sjögren, Dick Axelsson)

16 min
Penalties
14 min
23
Shots
33

October 14, 2010; 19:00	AIK	4 – 3 (1–1, 1–1, 2–1)	Modo Hockey	Hovet; Attendance: 3,626

Game reference

Viktor Fasth
Goalies
Nicklas Dahlberg
Referees:
Morgan Johansson
Ulf Rönnmark

Oscar Ahlström (Patrik Nemeth, Victor Ahlström) 11:14	1–0
	1–1	14:22 Byron Ritchie (Morten Madsen, Charlie Cook)
	1–2	21:00 (PP1) Nicklas Danielsson (R. Rosén, N. Sundström)
Christian Sandberg (Josh MacNevin, David Engblom) 22:06	2–2
	2–3	49:44 Per-Åge Skröder (Niklas Sundström)
Rastislav Pavlikovsky (Josh MacNevin, Kent McDonell) 53:44	3–3
Johan Andersson (Johannes Salmonsson, Fredrik Carlsson)	4–3

10 min
Penalties
8 min
28
Shots
31

October 14, 2010; 19:00	Södertälje SK	2 – 4 (0–2, 2–1, 0–1)	HV71	AXA Sports Center; Attendance: 3,448

Game reference

Pontus Sjögren
Goalies
Andreas Andersson
Referees:
Thomas Forsström
Patrik Sjöberg

	0–1	04:32 Teemu Laine (Johan Björk)
	0–2	12:47 (PP1) Martin Thörnberg (J. Davidsson, J. Hietanen)
Joakim Eriksson (Linus Videll) 21:40	1–2
Tim Heed (Linus Videll, Joakim Eriksson) (PP1) 23:21	2–2
	2–3	26:54 Oscar Sundh (Johan Lindström)
	2–4	59:48 (ENG) Jukka Voutilainen

6 min
Penalties
8 min
27
Shots
23

October 14, 2010; 19:00	Frölunda HC	2 – 4 (2–2, 0–1, 0–1)	Skellefteå AIK	Scandinavium; Attendance: 7,578

Game reference

Johan Holmqvist
Goalies
Joacim Eriksson
Referees:
Thomas Andersson
Christer Lärking

Nicklas Lasu (Christoph Schubert, Mikael Johansson) 03:40	1–0
	1–1	12:03 David Rundblad (Fredrik Warg, Joakim Lindström)
Toni Koivisto (Nicklas Lasu, Mikael Johansson) 15:39	2–1
	2–2	16:59 Mikko Lehtonen (Fredrik Lindgren, Joakim Lindström)
	2–3	35:44 (PP1) Mikko Lehtonen (J. Lindström, F. Lindgren)
	2–4	59:51 (ENG) Anders Söderberg (Jimmie Ericsson)

6 min
Penalties
6 min
39
Shots
35

== Round 11 ==
October 16, 2010; 16:00	Skellefteå AIK	2 – 0 (1–0, 0–0, 1–0)	Södertälje SK	Skellefteå Kraft Arena; Attendance: 4,817

Game reference
Andreas Hadelöv	Goalies	Riku Helenius	Referees: Morgan Johansson; Tobias Björk
David Rundblad (Fredrik Lindgren, Mikko Lehtonen) (PP1) 07:15 / 1–0; Pierre-Edouard Bellemare (Jimmie Ericsson, Erik Forssell) 44:25 / 2–0			Referees: Morgan Johansson; Tobias Björk
4 min	Penalties	4 min	Referees: Morgan Johansson; Tobias Björk
28	Shots	23	Referees: Morgan Johansson; Tobias Björk

October 16, 2010; 18:30	Djurgårdens IF	3 – 2 (2–1, 1–0, 0–1)	Frölunda HC	Hovet; Attendance: 7,767

Game reference

Mark Owuya
Goalies
Joakim Lundström
Referees:
Sören Persson
Mikael Nord

	0–1	05:21 Toni Koivisto (Mikael Johansson, Henrik Tömmernäs)
Mario Kempe 07:03	1–1
Patrik Cehlin (John Norman, Staffan Kronwall) 07:46	2–1
Mario Kempe (Josef Boumedienne) 37:47	3–1
	3–2	57:03 Robin Lindqvist (Niklas Andersson, Henrik Tömmernäs)

8 min
Penalties
6 min
23
Shots
33

October 16, 2010; 18:30	Brynäs IF	3 – 1 (0–0, 2–0, 1–1)	Linköpings HC	Läkerol Arena; Attendance: 4,800

Game reference

Niklas Svedberg
Goalies
Fredrik Norrena
Referees:
Ulf Rönnmark
David Bergman

Mads Hansen (Andreas Dackell, Anton Rödin) 26:27	1–0
Eero Somervuori (S. Lauritzen, L. Jonsson) (PP1) 35:09	2–0
	2–1	41:15 Patrik Zackrisson (Andreas Jämtin, Magnus Johansson)
Jakob Silfverberg (A. Sundström, M. Ekholm) (ENG) 59:08	3–1

4 min
Penalties
6 min
33
Shots
27

October 16, 2010; 18:30	Modo Hockey	5 – 1 (0–0, 2–1, 3–0)	HV71	Fjällräven Center; Attendance: 6,401

Game reference

Tuomas Tarkki
Goalies
Andreas Andersson
Referees:
Pehr Claesson
Patrik Sjöberg

	0–1	24:48 Johan Lindström (Pasi Puistola, Adam Almqvist)
Per-Åge Skröder (Robert Rosén, Per Svartvadet) (PP1) 35:42	1–1
Byron Ritchie (Per-Åge Skröder, Nicklas Danielsson) 37:08	2–1
Ole-Kristian Tollefsen (K. Forsberg, M. Timander) 43:54	3–1
Morten Madsen (Byron Ritchie, Hans Jonsson) 52:02	4–1
Mattias Timander (Per Svartvadet, Robert Rosén) (PP1) 56:37	5–1

12 min
Penalties
18 min
31
Shots
23

October 16, 2010; 18:30	Timrå IK	1 – 4 (0–0, 0–3, 1–1)	AIK	E.ON Arena; Attendance: 5,512

Game reference

Juha Pitkämäki
Goalies
Viktor Fasth
Referees:
Wolmer Edqvist
Niklas Lovefall

	0–1	22:45 (PP1) Johannes Salmonsson (Henrik Nilsson)
	0–2	26:41 (PP1) Victor Ahlström (Josh MacNevin, Dick Tärnström)
	0–3	30:34 Richard Gynge (Johannes Salmonsson)
Martin Röymark (Gabriel Karlsson, Per Hallin) 47:34	1–3
	1–4	58:00 (ENG) Oscar Steen (Daniel Rudslätt, Kent McDonell)

12 min
Penalties
14 min
26
Shots
36

October 19, 2010; 19:00	Färjestads BK	3 – 0 (1–0, 1–0, 1–0)	Luleå HF	Löfbergs Lila Arena; Attendance: 6,363

Game reference

Alexander Salak
Goalies
David Rautio
Referees:
Morgan Johansson
Sören Persson

Jonas Junland (Mikael Johansson, Pelle Prestberg) 08:00	1–0
Per Åslund (Dragan Umicevic, Anders Bastiansen) 30:45	2–0
Per Åslund (D. Umicevic, A. Bastiansen) (ENG) 59:44	3–0

12 min
Penalties
10 min
28
Shots
32

== Round 12 ==
October 21, 2010; 19:00	Södertälje SK	3 – 2 (1–1, 0–1, 2–0)	AIK	AXA Sports Center; Attendance: 4,822

Game reference

Pontus Sjögren
Goalies
Viktor Fasth
Referees:
Thomas Andersson
Tobias Björk

Lukas Kilström (Martin Chabada, Patrik Carlsson) 01:14	1–0
	1–1	16:36 Christian Sandberg (Victor Ahlström)
	1–2	31:00 Josh MacNevin (Kent McDonell, Dick Tärnström)
Ryan Lasch (Stefan Bemström) 48:05	2–2
Joakim Eriksson (Mattias Carlsson, Linus Videll) (PP1) 52:36	3–2

6 min
Penalties
14 min
26
Shots
22

October 21, 2010; 19:00	Luleå HF	1 – 0 (1–0, 0–0, 0–0)	Modo Hockey	Coop Norrbotten Arena; Attendance: 5,270

Game reference
Anders Nilsson	Goalies	Tuomas Tarkki	Referees: Sören Persson; Niklas Lovefall
Lars Lökken Östli (Janne Niinimaa) (PP1) 19:08 / 1–0			Referees: Sören Persson; Niklas Lovefall
10 min	Penalties	10 min	Referees: Sören Persson; Niklas Lovefall
20	Shots	13	Referees: Sören Persson; Niklas Lovefall

October 21, 2010; 19:00	Brynäs IF	2 – 1 (0–0, 1–1, 1–0)	Skellefteå AIK	Läkerol Arena; Attendance: 4,782

Game reference

Niklas Svedberg
Goalies
Joacim Eriksson
Referees:
Ulf Rådbjer
Mikael Nord

	0–1	27:04 Erik Forssell (Jimmie Ericsson, Pierre-Edouard Bellemare)
Jakob Silfverberg (A. Dackell, M. Ekholm) (PP1) 36:38	1–1
Mattias Ekholm (J. Silfverberg, A. Sundström) 58:59	2–1

12 min
Penalties
16 min
21
Shots
29

October 21, 2010; 19:00	Linköpings HC	2 – 4 (1–1, 1–3, 0–0)	Färjestads BK	Cloetta Center; Attendance: 7,958

Game reference

Fredrik Norrena
Goalies
Alexander Salak
Referees:
Pehr Claesson
Thomas Forsström

Erik Andersson (Jan Hlavac, Jaroslav Hlinka) (PP1) 12:10	1–0
	1–1	14:30 Patrik Lundh (Dick Axelsson)
	1–2	22:31 Anders Bastiansen (Dragan Umicevic, Martin Sevc)
	1–3	27:29 (PP1) Kristofer Berglund (M. Johansson, P. Prestberg)
	1–4	31:25 Dick Axelsson
Martin Laumann Ylvén (Jari Tolsa, Sebastian Karlsson) 36:28	2–4

10 min
Penalties
16 min
36
Shots
25

October 21, 2010; 19:00	HV71	2 – 0 (0–0, 1–0, 1–0)	Djurgårdens IF	Kinnarps Arena; Attendance: 6,796

Game reference
Daniel Larsson	Goalies	Mark Owuya	Referees: Christer Lärking; Wolmer Edqvist
Jukka Voutilainen (Johan Davidsson) 23:14 / 1–0; Kamil Piros (Oscar Sundh, Teemu Laine) 57:31 / 2–0			Referees: Christer Lärking; Wolmer Edqvist
8 min	Penalties	8 min	Referees: Christer Lärking; Wolmer Edqvist
30	Shots	21	Referees: Christer Lärking; Wolmer Edqvist

October 21, 2010; 19:00	Frölunda HC	3 – 5 (0–1, 2–1, 1–3)	Timrå IK	Scandinavium; Attendance: 7,622

Game reference

Joakim Lundström
Goalies
Juha Pitkämäki
Referees:
Patrik Sjöberg
Ulf Rönnmark

	0–1	07:03 (PP1) Anton Lander
Nicklas Lasu (Riku Hahl, Henrik Tömmernäs) 26:39	1–1
Mika Pyörälä (Niklas Andersson, Mikael Johansson) 34:35	2–1
	2–2	36:36 Ilkka Pikkarainen (Timo Pärssinen, Kim Hirschovits)
	2–3	47:25 (PP1) Elias Granat (Mattias Karlsson)
	2–4	51:33 Björn Svensson (Anton Axelsson)
Toni Koivisto (Carl Klingberg, Christoph Schubert) 58:31	3–4
	3–5	59:54 (ENG) Kim Hirschovits (Per Hallin)

10 min
Penalties
6 min
24
Shots
37

== Round 13 ==
October 18, 2010; 19:00	Timrå IK	2 – 4 (0–0, 1–2, 1–2)	Linköpings HC	E.ON Arena; Attendance: 4,662

Game reference

Magnus Åkerlund
Goalies
Fredrik Norrena
Referees:
Thomas Andersson
Mikael Lindqvist

	0–1	23:14 (PP2) Patrik Zackrisson (M. Johansson, N. Hävelid)
	0–2	24:36 (PP1) Andreas Molinder (Matt Murley, Erik Lindhagen)
Mattias Karlsson (Timo Pärssinen, Mikko Jokela) (PP1) 26:13	1–2
Timo Pärssinen (Ilkka Pikkarainen, Kim Hirschovits) 43:26	2–2
	2–3	44:29 Erik Andersson
	2–4	54:29 Erik Lindhagen (Magnus Johansson, Michael Holmqvist)

6 min
Penalties
10 min
23
Shots
29

October 18, 2010; 19:00	AIK	3 – 7 (1–2, 0–4, 2–1)	HV71	Hovet; Attendance: 4,528

Game reference

Viktor Fasth
Goalies
Andreas Andersson
Referees:
Christer Lärking
Karol Popovic

Oscar Ahlström (R. Pavlikovsky, J. MacNevin) (PP2) 05:56	1–0
	1–1	15:23 (PP1) Teemu Laine (Pasi Puistola, Jukka Voutilainen)
	1–2	19:40 André Petersson (Nichlas Torp, Pasi Puistola)
	1–3	22:10 (PP1) Martin Thörnberg (J. Davidsson, J. Voutilainen)
	1–4	28:24 Kamil Piros (Juuso Hietanen, Daniel Grillfors)
	1–5	30:23 Johan Lindström (Oscar Sundh, Juuso Hietanen)
	1–6	31:34 Kamil Piros (Nichlas Torp, Fredrik Bremberg)
	1–7	42:17 Daniel Grillfors (Andreas Falk)
David Engblom (Josh MacNevin, Richard Gynge) 43:23	2–7
Kent McDonell (Oscar Steen) 59:39	3–7

12 min
Penalties
16 min
27
Shots
32

October 19, 2010; 19:00	Djurgårdens IF	4 – 3 (0–3, 2–0, 2–0)	Brynäs IF	Hovet; Attendance: 6,643

Game reference

Mark Owuya
Goalies
Niklas Svedberg
Referee:
Pehr Claesson

	0–1	01:52 Sebastian Lauritzen (Jonas Nordquist)
	0–2	14:59 Lars Jonsson (Jonas Nordquist)
	0–3	18:19 Mattias Ekholm (Dale Clarke, Eero Somervuori)
Andreas Holmqvist (Patrick Cehlin, Staffan Kronwall) 22:44	1–3
Oscar Eklund (Kristofer Ottosson, Nils Ekman) 36:33	2–3
Josef Boumedienne (P. Cehlin, M. Krüger) (PP1) 43:39	3–3
Mario Kempe (Daniel Brodin, David Printz) 51:40	4–3

26 min
Penalties
10 min
22
Shots
32

October 23, 2010; 16:00	Frölunda HC	3 – 0 (1–0, 2–0, 0–0)	Modo Hockey	Scandinavium; Attendance: 9,074

Game reference

Johan Holmqvist
Goalies
Tuomas Tarkki
Referees:
Pehr Claesson
Mikael Nord

Ville Mäntymaa (Mika Pyörälä, Niklas Andersson) (PP1) 04:24	1–0
Per-Johan Axelsson (Tomi Kallio, Henrik Tömmernäs) 33:31	2–0
Mikko Mäenpää (Tomi Kallio, Per-Johan Axelsson) 36:36	3–0

12 min
Penalties
45 min
34
Shots
30

October 23, 2010; 16:00	Färjestads BK	1 – 4 (0–2, 1–0, 0–2)	Södertälje SK	Löfbergs Lila Arena; Attendance: 5,890

Game reference

Alexander Salak
Goalies
Pontus Sjögren
Referee:
David Bergman

	0–1	10:35 Mattias Carlsson (Linus Videll)
	0–2	17:17 (PP1) Joakim Eriksson (Linus Videll, Arto Laatikainen)
Sanny Lindström (M. Johansson, A. Salak) (PP1) 36:51	1–2
	1–3	40:16 Mattias Carlsson
	1–4	59:38 (ENG) Stefan Bemström (Lukas Kilström)

6 min
Penalties
12 min
35
Shots
25

October 23, 2010; 18:30	Skellefteå AIK	2 – 3 (OT) (1–1, 1–1, 0–0, 0–1)	Luleå HF	Skellefteå Kraft Arena; Attendance: 6,001

Game reference

Andreas Hadelöv
Goalies
David Rautio
Referees:
Morgan Johansson
Wolmer Edqvist

Joakim Lindström (N. Burström, P-E. Bellemare) 18:13	1–0
	1–1	18:32 Kim Karlsson (Simon Hjalmarsson, Sebastian Enterfeldt)
Martin Lundberg (David Rundblad, Oscar Lindberg) 25:05	2–1
	2–2	33:31 (PP1) Pär Arlbrandt (Elias Fälth, Niklas Olausson)
	2–3	61:41 (OT) Pär Arlbrandt (Chris Abbott, Topi Jaakola)

10 min
Penalties
4 min
20
Shots
23

== Round 14 ==
October 26, 2010; 19:00	AIK	0 – 3 (0–1, 0–2, 0–3)	Luleå HF	Hovet; Attendance: 4,147

Game reference

Viktor Fasth
Goalies
Anders Nilsson
Referee:
Sören Persson

0–1	16:54 (PP1) Elias Fälth (Niklas Olausson, Pär Arlbrandt)
0–2	20:20 Cam Abbott (Joonas Vihko)
0–3	59:39 (ENG) Sebastian Enterfeldt (J. Sandström, R. Jonsson)

8 min
Penalties
6 min
16
Shots
17

October 26, 2010; 19:00	Södertälje SK	7 – 2 (3–0, 2–1, 2–1)	Brynäs IF	AXA Sports Center; Attendance: 4,206

Game reference

Pontus Sjögren
Goalies
Thomas Greiss
Referee:
Morgan Johansson

Jonas Almtorp (Patrik Carlsson, Mikko Kalteva) (SH1) 03:42	1–0
Ryan Lasch (Lukas Kilström, Stefan Bemström) 05:40	2–0
Arto Laatikainen (Markus Seikola, Linus Videll) (PP1) 18:34	3–0
	3–1	27:15 (PP1) Mattias Ekholm (J. Granström, S. Lauritzen)
Ryan Lasch (Pekka Saarenheimo, Fredric Andersson) 31:32	4–1
Martin Chabada (Jonas Almtorp, Fredrik Carlsson) 32:28	5–1
Robert Carlsson (Joakim Eriksson, Arto Laatikainen) 42:59	6–1
	6–2	35:56 Jakob Silfverberg (Anton Rödin, Jonas Nordquist)
Ryan Lasch (Pekka Saarenheimo, Lukas Kilström) 56:47	7–2

12 min
Penalties
14 min
37
Shots
12

October 26, 2010; 19:00	Färjestads BK	4 – 2 (1–0, 1–2, 2–0)	Timrå IK	Löfbergs Lila Arena; Attendance: 5,335

Game reference

Alexander Salak
Goalies
Juha Pitkämäki
Referee:
Patrik Sjöberg

Patrik Lundh (Dragan Umicevic, Per Åslund)	1–0
	1–1	20:15 (SH1) Gabriel Karlsson (Martin Röymark)
	1–2	21:15 Daniel Corso (Sebastian Erixon)
Pelle Prestberg (Dick Axelsson, Mattias Sjögren) 39:28	2–2
Marius Holtet (Kristofer Berglund, Patrik Lundh) 44:41	3–2
Christian Berglund (P. Prestberg, M. Johansson) (PP2) 55:35	4–2

56 min
Penalties
22 min
36
Shots
29

October 26, 2010; 19:00	Linköpings HC	1 – 4 (0–3, 1–0, 0–1)	Skellefteå AIK	Cloetta Center; Attendance: 5,950

Game reference

Fredrik Norrena
Goalies
Andreas Hadelöv
Referee:
Ulf Rönnmark

	0–1	07:09 (PP1) Mikko Lehtonen (D. Rundblad, J. Lindström)
	0–2	12:51 Anders Söderberg (Tim Erixon, Ivan Majesky)
	0–3	16:20 Erik Forssell (Jimmie Ericsson, Niclas Burström)
Jaroslav Hlinka (Magnus Johansson, Jan Hlavac) (PP1) 24:39	1–3
	1–4	46:13 (PP1) Joakim Lindström (M. Lehtonen, D. Rundblad)

36 min
Penalties
10 min
36
Shots
25

October 26, 2010; 19:00	HV71	4 – 0 (1–0, 1–0, 2–0)	Modo Hockey	Kinnarps Arena; Attendance: 6,584

Game reference

Daniel Larsson
Goalies
Tuomas Tarkki
Referee:
Wolmer Edqvist

Andreas Falk (Per Ledin, André Petersson) (PP1) 19:48	1–0
André Petersson (Johan Davidsson, Pasi Puistola) (PP1) 39:21	2–0
Daniel Rahimi (Teemu Laine, Fredrik Bremberg) 52:18	3–0
Martin Thörnberg (Juuso Hietanen, Johan Davidsson) 57:41	4–0

26 min
Penalties
30 min
28
Shots
35

October 26, 2010; 19:00	Frölunda HC	3 – 0 (0–0, 1–0, 2–0)	Djurgårdens IF	Scandinavium; Attendance: 10,003

Game reference

Johan Holmqvist
Goalies
Mark Owuya
Referee:
Thomas Andersson

Mika Pyörälä (Niklas Andersson, Riku Hahl) 23:52	1–0
Niklas Andersson (Robin Lindqvist) 50:54	2–0
Robin Lindqvist (Tomi Kallio, Mikael Johansson) (PP1) 55:37	3–0

6 min
Penalties
10 min
42
Shots
29

== Round 15 ==
October 28, 2010; 19:00	Luleå HF	3 – 2 (0–0, 3–1, 0–1)	Södertälje SK	Coop Norrbotten Arena; Attendance: 4,850

Game reference

David Rautio
Goalies
Pontus Sjögren
Referee:
Christer Lärking

	0–1	22:26 Arto Laatikainen (Ryan Lasch, Fredric Andersson)
Simon Hjalmarsson (Topi Jaakola, Janne Niinimaa) 25:24	1–1
Simon Hjalmarsson (Kim Karlsson, Elias Fälth) 28:36	2–1
Chris Abbott (Cam Abbott, Elias Fälth) 31:31	3–1
	3–2	59:10 Patrik Carlsson (Ryan Lasch, Joakim Eriksson)

2 min
Penalties
4 min
31
Shots
19

October 28, 2010; 19:00	Skellefteå AIK	3 – 1 (0–0, 2–1, 1–0)	Frölunda HC	Skellefteå Kraft Arena; Attendance: 4,435

Game reference

Joacim Eriksson
Goalies
Johan Holmqvist
Referee:
Ulf Rådbjer

	0–1	20:49 Toni Koivisto (Ville Mäntymaa)
Fredrik Warg (David Rundblad, Fredrik Lindgren) (PP1) 25:03	1–1
Fredrik Warg (Joakim Lindström, Mikko Lehtonen) (PP1) 26:12	2–1
Pierre-Edouard Bellemare (Jimmie Ericsson, Erik Forssell) 44:47	3–1

6 min
Penalties
10 min
28
Shots
19

October 28, 2010; 19:00	Modo Hockey	0 – 3 (0–2, 0–1, 0–0)	Färjestads BK	Fjällräven Center; Attendance: 5,324

Game reference

Tuomas Tarkki
Goalies
Cristopher Nihlstorp
Referee:
Morgan Johansson

0–1	09:12 (PP1) Kristofer Berglund (Jonas Junland, Patrik Lundh)
0–2	14:28 (PP1) Dragan Umicevic (Martin Sevc, Jonas Junland)
0–3	20:27 (PP1) Dick Axelsson (Jonas Junland, Dragan Umicevic)

26 min
Penalties
20 min
24
Shots
26

October 28, 2010; 19:00	Brynäs IF	0 – 3 (0–2, 0–0, 0–1)	AIK	Läkerol Arena; Attendance: 5,901

Game reference

Thomas Greiss
Goalies
Viktor Fasth
Referee:
Thomas Forsström

0–1	11:05 Kent McDonell (Daniel Rudslätt, Rastislav Pavlikovský)
0–2	19:51 Daniel Bång (Tobias Ericsson)
0–3	47:18 (PP1) Victor Ahlström (Oscar Ahlström, Oscar Steen)

6 min
Penalties
8 min
20
Shots
29

October 28, 2010; 19:00	Djurgårdens IF	1 – 0 (SO) (0–0, 0–0, 0–0, 0–0, 1–0)	Linköpings HC	Hovet; Attendance: 6,248

Game reference
Mark Owuya	Goalies	Fredrik Norrena	Referee: Patrik Sjöberg
Mario Kempe (SO) 65:00 / 1–0			Referee: Patrik Sjöberg
10 min	Penalties	31 min	Referee: Patrik Sjöberg
29	Shots	31	Referee: Patrik Sjöberg

October 28, 2010; 19:00	HV71	2 – 4 (0–2, 2–1, 0–1)	Timrå IK	Kinnarps Arena; Attendance: 6,526

Game reference

Daniel Larsson
Goalies
Juha Pitkämäki
Referee:
Thomas Andersson

	0–1	02:18 (SH1) Timo Pärssinen
	0–2	13:57 Gabriel Karlsson (Martin Röymark)
	0–3	27:43 Timo Pärssinen (Antti Halonen, Ilkka Pikkarainen)
Pasi Puistola (Juuso Hietanen, Johan Davidsson) (PP1) 30:45	1–3
Jesper Fasth (Oscar Sundh, Johan Lindström) 32:20	2–3
	2–4	47:43 (PP1) Ilkka Pikkarainen (Kim Hirschovits, Mikko Jokela)

4 min
Penalties
8 min
31
Shots
22

== Round 16 ==
October 30, 2010; 16:00	Södertälje SK	3 – 4 (OT) (2–0, 0–2, 1–1, 0–1)	Modo Hockey	AXA Sports Center; Attendance: 4,841

Game reference

Pontus Sjögren
Goalies
Tuomas Tarkki
Referees:
Patrik Sjöberg
Wolmer Edqvist

Pierre Hedin (Patrik Carlsson) 03:30	1–0
Pierre Hedin (Patrik Carlsson, Martin Chabada) 09:50	2–0
	2–1	22:45 (PP1) Anton Hedman (Jens Westin, Per Svartvadet)
	2–2	33:34 Magnus Häggström (Jacob Blomqvist, Per Svartvadet)
Mattias Carlsson (Linus Videll, Joakim Eriksson)	3–2
	3–3	52:55 Byron Ritchie (Alexander Bonaksen, Kristian Forsberg)
	3–4	60:48 (OT) Byron Ritchie (Per Hållberg)

6 min
Penalties
10 min
24
Shots
25

October 30, 2010; 16:00	Färjestads BK	3 – 4 (0–1, 0–2, 3–1)	Skellefteå AIK	Löfbergs Lila Arena; Attendance: 6,572

Game reference

Cristopher Nihlstorp
Goalies
Andreas Hadelöv
Referees:
Christer Lärking
Pehr Claesson

	0–1	09:10 Mikko Lehtonen (Joakim Lindström, Niclas Burström)
	0–2	28:18 Erik Forssell (Jimmie Ericsson, David Rundblad)
	0–3	35:17 (PP1) Joakim Lindström (Tim Erixon, Mikko Lehtonen)
	0–4	43:22 Fredrik Warg (Mikko Lehtonen, Joakim Lindström)
Dick Axelsson (Mattias Sjögren, Jonas Brodin) 49:23	1–4
Dick Axelsson (Marcus Paulsson, Mattias Sjögren) 52:12	2–4
Dick Axelsson 54:17	3–4

12 min
Penalties
10 min
32
Shots
33

October 30, 2010; 16:00	AIK	2 – 1 (1–0, 1–1, 0–0)	Linköpings HC	Hovet; Attendance: 3,153

Game reference

Viktor Fasth
Goalies
Fredrik Norrena
Referees:
Niclas Johansson
Mikael Sjöqvist

Stefan Johansson (Rastislav Pavlikovský) 11:47	1–0
	1–1	26:48 Michael Holmqvist (Josef Melichar)
Kent McDonell (Patric Blomdahl) 34:47	2–1

4 min
Penalties
10 min
24
Shots
17

October 30, 2010; 16:00	Frölunda HC	3 – 4 (0–0, 1–3, 2–1)	HV71	Scandinavium; Attendance: 11,158

Game reference

Johan Holmqvist
Goalies
Daniel Larsson
Referees:
Sören Persson
Niklas Lovefall

	0–1	21:19 (PP1) Martin Thörnberg (J. Hietanen, J. Davidsson)
	0–2	27:38 Teemu Laine (Fredrik Bremberg, Kamil Piros)
	0–3	28:03 Daniel Grillfors (Andreas Falk)
Mikko Mäenpää (Niklas Andersson, Riku Hahl) (PP1) 35:26	1–3
Mika Pyörälä (Mikko Mäenpää, Niklas Andersson) (PP1) 45:50	2–3
	2–4	57:35 Jukka Voutilainen (Martin Thörnberg)
Henrik Tömmernäs (GK out) 59:45	3–4

37 min
Penalties
41 min
43
Shots
34

October 30, 2010; 18:30	Timrå IK	3 – 6 (0–1, 1–3, 2–2)	Djurgårdens IF	E.ON Arena; Attendance: 5,118

Game reference

Magnus Åkerlund
Goalies
Mark Owuya
Referees:
Ulf Rådbjer
Tobias Björk

	0–1	09:49 Kristofer Ottosson (Patrick Cehlin, Staffan Kronwall)
Anton Lander (Daniel Corso, Elias Granat)	1–1
	1–2	27:48 Josef Boumedienne (Marcus Krüger, Daniel Widing)
	1–3	31:15 Staffan Kronwall (Marcus Krüger, Mathias Tjärnqvist)
	1–4	37:51 (PP1) Andreas Holmqvist (M. Krüger, D. Widing)
Per Hallin (Antti Halonen) (SH1) 40:23	2–4
Daniel Corso (Mattias Karlsson, Fredrik Hynning) 50:27	3–4
	3–5	53:53 Staffan Kronwall (Tim Eriksson, John Norman)
	3–6	59:41 (SH1, ENG) Kristofer Ottosson

10 min
Penalties
10 min
20
Shots
24

October 30, 2010; 18:30	Brynäs IF	4 – 2 (2–1, 1–0, 1–1)	Luleå HF	Läkerol Arena; Attendance: 5,642

Game reference

Thomas Greiss
Goalies
Anders Nilsson
Referees:
Ulf Rönnmark
David Bergman

Jakob Silfverberg (Niclas Andersén) 05:00	1–0
Jonas Nordquist (M. Kahnberg, S. Lauritzen) 12:18	2–0
	2–1	19:00 (PP1) Mats Lavander (Elias Fälth, Pär Arlbrandt)
Dale Clarke (Sebastian Lauritzen, Jonas Nordquist) 25:37	3–1
	3–2	50:05 (PP1) Pär Arlbrandt (Niklas Olausson, Elias Fälth)
Eero Somervuori (ENG) 59:19	4–2

12 min
Penalties
10 min
27
Shots
22

== Round 17 ==
November 1, 2010; 19:00	AIK	5 – 2 (1–0, 3–1, 1–1)	Frölunda HC	Hovet; Attendance: 4,083

Game reference

Viktor Fasth
Goalies
Johan Holmqvist
Referee:
Thomas Andersson

Johan Andersson (D. Tärnström, J. Salmonsson) (PP1) 11:01	1–0
Christian Sandberg (Daniel Bång) 25:00	2–0
Stefan Johansson (Oscar Steen, Oscar Ahlström) 26:02	3–0
Dick Tärnström (J. Salmonsson, C. Sandberg) (PP1) 33:39	4–0
	4–1	39:13 Linus Fagemo (Nicklas Lasu, Mikael Johansson)
Peter Nolander (Johannes Salmonsson, Richard Gynge) 53:04	5–1
	5–2	59:32 Mika Pyörälä (Henrik Tömmernäs, Riku Hahl)

16 min
Penalties
6 min
26
Shots
35

November 2, 2010; 19:00	Luleå HF	x – x	Linköpings HC	Coop Norrbotten Arena

November 2, 2010; 19:00	Skellefteå AIK	x – x	Timrå IK	Skellefteå Kraft Arena

November 2, 2010; 19:00	Modo Hockey	x – x	Brynäs IF	Fjällräven Center

November 2, 2010; 19:00	Djurgårdens IF	x – x	Södertälje SK	Hovet

November 2, 2010; 19:00	HV71	x – x	Färjestads BK	Kinnarps Arena

== Round 18 ==
November 4, 2010; 19:00	Timrå IK	x – x	Modo Hockey	E.ON Arena

November 4, 2010; 19:00	Djurgårdens IF	x – x	AIK	Ericsson Globe

November 4, 2010; 19:00	Södertälje SK	x – x	Skellefteå AIK	AXA Sports Center

November 4, 2010; 19:00	Brynäs IF	x – x	Färjestads BK	Läkerol Arena

November 4, 2010; 19:00	Linköpings HC	x – x	HV71	Cloetta Center

November 4, 2010; 19:00	Frölunda HC	x – x	Luleå HF	Scandinavium

== Round 19 ==
November 6, 2010; 16:00	Skellefteå AIK	x – x	Djurgårdens IF	Skellefteå Kraft Arena

November 6, 2010; 16:00	Brynäs IF	x – x	Frölunda HC	Läkerol Arena

November 6, 2010; 16:00	Timrå IK	x – x	AIK	E.ON Arena

November 6, 2010; 16:00	HV71	x – x	Södertälje SK	Kinnarps Arena

November 6, 2010; 18:30	Luleå HF	x – x	Färjestads BK	Coop Norrbotten Arena

November 6, 2010; 18:30	Modo Hockey	x – x	Linköpings HC	Cloetta Center

== Round 20 ==
November 18, 2010; 19:00	Djurgårdens IF	x – x	Färjestads BK	Hovet

November 18, 2010; 19:00	Luleå HF	x – x	Timrå IK	Coop Norrbotten Arena

November 18, 2010; 19:00	Skellefteå AIK	x – x	HV71	Skellefteå Kraft Arena

November 18, 2010; 19:00	Modo Hockey	x – x	AIK	Fjällräven Center

November 18, 2010; 19:00	Linköpings HC	x – x	Brynäs IF	Cloetta Center

November 18, 2010; 19:00	Södertälje SK	x – x	Frölunda HC	AXA Sports Center

== Round 21 ==
November 20, 2010; 16:00	Djurgårdens IF	3 – 1	Modo Hockey	Hovet

Game reference

November 20, 2010; 16:00	HV71	4 – 1	Luleå HF	Kinnarps Arena

Game reference

November 20, 2010; 16:00	Färjestads BK	1 – 3	Frölunda HC	Löfbergs Lila Arena

Game reference

November 20, 2010; 18:30	Södertälje SK	4 – 2	Linköpings HC	AXA Sports Center

Game reference

November 20, 2010; 18:30	Timrå IK	3 – 2 (SO)	Brynäs IF	E.ON Arena

Game reference

November 21, 2010; 16:00	AIK	4 – 2 (2–0, 1–0, 1–2)	Skellefteå AIK	AXA Sports Center; Attendance: 6,578

Game reference

Viktor Fasth
Goalies
Joacim Eriksson
Referees:
Sören Persson
Teemu Salminen

Rastislav Pavlikovsky (Daniel Rudslätt, Kent McDonell) 03:14	1–0
Johan Andersson (Fredrik Carlsson) 06:41	2–0
Daniel Bång (Tobias Ericsson) 25:58	3–0
	3–1	42:23 Pierre-Edouard Bellemare (Tim Erixon)
	3–2	54:10 (PP1) Joakim Lindström (David Rundblad, Tim Erixon)
Daniel Rudslätt (R. Pavlikovsky, F. Carlsson) (ENG) 59:42	4–2

14 min
Penalties
14 min
23
Shots
42

== Round 23 ==
November 16, 2010; 19:00	AIK	x – x	Södertälje SK	Hovet

November 25, 2010; 19:00	Skellefteå AIK	x – x	Brynäs IF	Skellefteå Kraft Arena

November 25, 2010; 19:00	Modo Hockey	x – x	Timrå IK	Fjällräven Center

November 25, 2010; 19:00	Djurgårdens IF	x – x	Frölunda HC	Hovet

November 25, 2010; 19:00	Färjestads BK	x – x	Luleå HF	Löfbergs Lila Arena

November 25, 2010; 19:00	HV71	x – x	Linköpings HC	Kinnarps Arena

== Round 24 ==
November 27, 2010; 16:00	HV71	4 – 1 (1–0, 2–1, 1–0)	Skellefteå AIK	Kinnarps Arena; Attendance: 6,885

Game reference

Daniel Larsson
Goalies
Joacim Eriksson
Referees:
Patrik Sjöberg
Christer Lärking

Teemu Laine (Mikko Luoma, Kamil Piros) 19:20	1–0
Teemu Laine 21:30	2–0
	2–1	21:54 (PP1) Anders Söderberg (P-E. Bellemare, T. Erixon)
Kris Beech (Kamil Piros, Teemu Laine) (PP1) 25:15	3–1
Mikko Luoma (Kamil Piros, Adam Almqvist) (PP1) 47:40	4–1

32 min
Penalties
20 min
31
Shots
26

November 27, 2010; 16:00	Brynäs IF	4 – 3 (OT) (1–1, 2–1, 0–1, 1–0)	Djurgårdens IF	Läkerol Arena; Attendance: 8,045

Game reference

Thomas Greiss
Goalies
Stefan Ridderwall
Referees:
Ulf Rönnmark
Sören Persson

	0–1	02:14 Mario Kempe
Jakob Silfverberg (Mattias Ekholm, Calle Järnkrok) (PP1) 37:25	1–1
Mattias Ekholm (Calle Järnkrok, Anton Rödin) (PP1) 26:08	2–1
Andreas Dackell (J. Granström, S. Lauritzen) (PP1) 29:49	3–1
	3–2	36:45 (SH1) Staffan Kronwall (Marcus Krüger, Mario Kempe)
	3–3	46:09 Josef Boumedienne (Nils Ekman, Kristofer Ottosson)
Niclas Andersén (Calle Järnkrok, Jakob Silfverberg) (OT) 63:46	4–3

10 min
Penalties
39 min
36
Shots
31

November 27, 2010; 16:00	Frölunda HC	4 – 3 (1–1, 0–1, 3–1)	AIK	Scandinavium; Attendance: 9,004

Game reference

Johan Holmqvist
Goalies
Viktor Fasth
Referees:
Pehr Claesson
Niclas Johansson

Toni Koivisto (Mika Pyörälä) 03:11	1–0
	1–1	12:55 Johannes Salmonsson (J. Andersson, D. Tärnström)
	1–2	39:53 Tobias Ericsson (Rastislav Pavlikovsky)
Pavel Skrbek (Toni Koivisto, Riku Hahl) (PP1) 45:07	2–2
Niklas Andersson (Tomi Kallio, Henrik Tömmernäs) (PP1) 52:04	3–2
Per-Johan Axelsson (Nicklas Lasu, Mikael Johansson) 57:13	4–2
	4–3	59:57 (GK out, PP1) J. Salmonsson (K. McDonell, D. Tärnström)

4 min
Penalties
6 min
38
Shots
25

November 27, 2010; 18:30	Timrå IK	1 – 4 (1–2, 0–1, 0–1)	Luleå HF	E.ON Arena; Attendance: 5,011

Game reference

Juha Pitkämäki
Goalies
David Rautio
Referees:
Ulf Rådbjer
Wolmer Edqvist

Per Hallin (Pär Styf, Ilkka Pikkarainen) (PP1) 15:26	1–0
	1–1	15:55 Elias Fälth (Pär Arlbrandt)
	1–2	19:39 (PP1) Jan Sandström (Joonas Vihko, Chris Abbott)
	1–3	38:42 Karl Fabricius (Chris Abbott)
	1–4	54:17 Jonas Berglund (Kim Karlsson, Sebastian Enterfeldt)

6 min
Penalties
6 min
21
Shots
23

November 27, 2010; 18:30	Södertälje SK	6 – 2 (3–0, 1–2, 2–0)	Färjestads BK	AXA Sports Center; Attendance: 3,849

Game reference

Riku Helenius
Goalies
Alexander Salak
Referees:
Morgan Johansson
Thomas Forsström

Martin Chabada (Jonas Almtorp, Robert Carlsson) 01:41	1–0
Robert Carlsson (Arto Laatikainen, Jonas Almtorp) 04:22	2–0
Ryan Lasch (Markus Seikola, Patrik Carlsson) (PP1) 08:42	3–0
Linus Videll (Joakim Eriksson, Markus Seikola) 25:53	4–0
	4–1	29:51 Sanny Lindström (Dragan Umicevic, Christian Berglund)
	4–2	36:20 (PP1) Jonas Junland (Pelle Prestberg, Dragan Umicevic)
Mattias Carlsson (Joakim Eriksson, Pierre Hedin) 55:43	5–2
Patrik Carlsson (Ryan Lasch, Mathias Månsson) 57:49	6–2

6 min
Penalties
20 min
28
Shots
36

December 13, 2010; 19:00	Linköpings HC	x – x	Modo Hockey	Cloetta Center

== Round 25 ==
November 29, 2010; 19:00	Luleå HF	2 – 4 (0–0, 0–3, 2–1)	Frölunda HC	Coop Norrbotten Arena; Attendance: 4,373

Game reference

David Rautio
Goalies
Johan Holmqvist
Referees:
Tomas Andersson
Mikael Nord

	0–1	24:55 Niklas Andersson (H. Tömmernäs, C. Bäckman)
	0–2	35:25 Tomi Kallio (Niklas Andersson, Andreas Karlsson)
	0–3	36:51 Mikael Johansson (Nicklas Lasu, Per-Johan Axelsson)
Pär Arlbrandt (Simon Hjalmarsson, Janne Niinimaa) 42:46	1–3
Jonas Berglund 46:07	2–3
	2–4	55:21 Toni Koivisto (Mika Pyörälä, Pavel Skrbek)

0 min
Penalties
10 min
33
Shots
21

November 29, 2010; 19:00	AIK	2 – 5 (1–1, 1–3, 0–1)	Brynäs IF	Hovet; Attendance: 4,536

Game reference

Vesa Toskala
Goalies
Thomas Greiss
Referees:
Morgan Johansson
Mikael Sjöqvist

	0–1	10:09 Jonas Nordquist (Johan Larsson, Simon Bertilsson)
Oscar Steen (Peter Nolander, Victor Ahlström) 16:20	1–1
	1–2	23:33 Alexander Sundström (Jonathan Granström, Dale Clarke)
Oscar Ahlström (Oscar Steen) 30:00	2–2
	2–3	36:54 Jonathan Carlsson (S. Lauritzen, J. Nordquist)
	2–4	38:15 (PP1) Mattias Ekholm (Calle Järnkrok, Jakob Silfverberg)
	2–5	58:17 (SH1, ENG) Andreas Dackell (J. Granström, D. Clarke)

8 min
Penalties
12 min
17
Shots
25

November 30, 2010; 19:00	Skellefteå AIK	1 – 4 (0–1, 0–0, 1–3)	Modo Hockey	Skellefteå Kraft Arena; Attendance: 4,781

Game reference

Andreas Hadelöv
Goalies
Tuomas Tarkki
Referees:
Thomas Andersson
Mikael Nord

	0–1	03:57 Nicklas Danielsson (Morten Madsen)
Christian Söderström (Tim Erixon, Jimmie Ericsson) 42:27	1–1
	1–2	49:16 Morten Madsen (Byron Ritchie)
	1–3	59:00 (ENG) Byron Ritchie
	1–4	59:51 (ENG) Per-Åge Skröder

12 min
Penalties
10 min
38
Shots
25

November 30, 2010; 19:00	Djurgårdens IF	2 – 3 (OT) (1–1, 0–1, 1–0, 0–1)	HV71	Hovet; Attendance: 6,003

Game reference

Stefan Ridderwall
Goalies
Daniel Larsson
Referees:
Morgan Johansson
Niklas Lovefall

Marcus Krüger (Daniel Widing, Patrick Cehlin) (PP1) 04:44	1–0
	1–1	05:06 Kamil Piros (Kris Beech)
	1–2	29:54 Teemu Laine
Andreas Holmqvist (Marcus Krüger, Daniel Widing) (PP1) 51:54	2–2
	2–3	62:26 (OT, PP1) Martin Thörnberg (J. Hietanen, J. Davidsson)

8 min
Penalties
20 min
46
Shots
16

November 30, 2010; 19:00	Södertälje SK	2 – 5 (1–2, 0–0, 1–3)	Timrå IK	AXA Sports Center; Attendance: 3,269

Game reference

Riku Helenius
Goalies
Magnus Åkerlund / Juha Pitkämäki
Referees:
Patrik Sjöberg
David Bergman

	0–1	02:13 Anton Axelsson (Anton Lander, Per Hallin)
Thom Flodqvist (Mikko Kalteva) 09:31	1–1
	1–2	17:03 Timo Pärssinen (Fredrik Sonntag)
Markus Seikola (Joakim Eriksson) (PP2) 40:10	2–2
	2–3	54:01 Matt Murley
	2–4	57:56 Ilkka Pikkarainen (Kim Hirschovits)
	2–5	58:26 (ENG) Anton Lander

10 min
Penalties
8 min
39
Shots
25

November 30, 2010; 19:00	Färjestads BK	3 – 2 (SO) (1–1, 0–0, 1–1, 0–0, 1–0)	Linköpings HC	Löfbergs Lila Arena; Attendance: 5,617

Game reference

Alexander Salak
Goalies
Fredrik Norrena
Referees:
Pehr Claesson
Ulf Rönnmark

Pelle Prestberg (Mikael Johansson) 07:38	1–0
	1–1	18:40 (SH1) Sebastian Karlsson
	1–2	49:25 Magnus Johansson (Patrik Zackrisson, Jari Tolsa)
Christian Berglund (A. Bastiansen, D. Umicevic) 51:07	2–2
Christian Berglund (SO) 65:00	3–2

8 min
Penalties
8 min
28
Shots
24

== Round 26 ==
November 16, 2010; 19:00	Frölunda HC	x – x	Skellefteå AIK	Scandinavium

December 2, 2010; 19:00	Modo Hockey	x – x	Södertälje SK	Fjällräven Center

December 2, 2010; 19:00	Timrå IK	x – x	HV71	E.ON Arena

December 2, 2010; 19:00	Brynäs IF	x – x	Färjestads BK	Läkerol Arena

December 2, 2010; 19:00	Linköpings HC	x – x	Luleå HF	Cloetta Center

December 22, 2010; 19:00	AIK	x – x	Djurgårdens IF	Ericsson Globe

== Round 27 ==
December 4, 2010; 16:00	Skellefteå AIK	x – x	AIK	Skellefteå Kraft Arena

December 4, 2010; 16:00	Djurgårdens IF	x – x	Timrå IK	Hovet

December 4, 2010; 16:00	Färjestads BK	x – x	Modo Hockey	Löfbergs Lila Arena

December 4, 2010; 16:00	Linköpings HC	x – x	Södertälje SK	Cloetta Center

December 4, 2010; 17:00	Luleå HF	x – x	Brynäs IF	Coop Norrbotten Arena

December 4, 2010; 18:30	HV71	x – x	Frölunda HC	Kinnarps Arena

== Round 28 ==
December 6, 2010; 19:00	AIK	x – x	Färjestads BK	Hovet

December 7, 2010; 19:00	Modo Hockey	x – x	HV71	Fjällräven Center

December 7, 2010; 19:00	Timrå IK	x – x	Skellefteå AIK	E.ON Arena

December 7, 2010; 19:00	Brynäs IF	x – x	Linköpings HC	Läkerol Arena

December 7, 2010; 19:00	Djurgårdens IF	x – x	Luleå HF	Hovet

December 7, 2010; 19:00	Södertälje SK	x – x	Frölunda HC	AXA Sports Center

== Round 29 ==
December 9, 2010; 19:00	Luleå HF	x – x	AIK	Coop Norrbotten Arena

December 9, 2010; 19:00	Skellefteå AIK	x – x	Södertälje SK	Skellefteå Kraft Arena

December 9, 2010; 19:00	Brynäs IF	x – x	Timrå IK	Läkerol Arena

December 9, 2010; 19:00	Färjestads BK	x – x	HV71	Löfbergs Lila Arena

December 9, 2010; 19:00	Linköpings HC	x – x	Djurgårdens IF	Cloetta Center

December 9, 2010; 19:00	Frölunda HC	x – x	Modo Hockey	Scandinavium

== Round 30 ==
December 11, 2010; 16:00	Södertälje SK	3 – 2 (0–0, 2–1, 1–1)	Luleå HF	AXA Sports Center

Game reference

Pontus Sjögren
Goalies
David Rautio

Fredric Andersson (Ryan Lasch, Mattias Carlsson) 27:23	1–0
	1–1	30:21 Sebastian Enterfeldt (Elias Fälth, Topi Jaakola)
Robert Carlsson (Mikko Kalteva, Linus Videll) 37:46	2–1
Ryan Lasch (Fredric Andersson) 41:29	3–1
	3–2	48:30 (PP1) Janne Niinimaa (Simon Hjalmarsson, Elias Fälth)

December 11, 2010; 16:00	HV71	x – x	Brynäs IF	Kinnarps Arena

December 11, 2010; 16:00	Frölunda HC	x – x	Linköpings HC	Scandinavium

December 11, 2010; 16:00	AIK	x – x	Timrå IK	Hovet

December 11, 2010; 18:30	Skellefteå AIK	x – x	Färjestads BK	Skellefteå Kraft Arena

December 11, 2010; 18:30	Modo Hockey	x – x	Djurgårdens IF	Fjällräven Center

== Round 31 ==
December 26, 2010; 16:00	Luleå HF	x – x	HV71	Coop Norrbotten Arena

December 26, 2010; 16:00	Brynäs IF	x – x	Södertälje SK	Läkerol Arena

December 26, 2010; 16:00	Modo Hockey	x – x	AIK	Fjällräven Center

December 26, 2010; 16:00	Djurgårdens IF	x – x	Skellefteå AIK	Hovet

December 26, 2010; 16:00	Linköpings HC	x – x	Timrå IK	Cloetta Center

December 26, 2010; 19:30	Färjestads BK	x – x	Frölunda HC	Outdoor rink

== Round 32 ==
December 28, 2010; 19:00	Skellefteå AIK	x – x	Linköpings HC	Skellefteå Kraft Arena

December 28, 2010; 19:00	Modo Hockey	x – x	Luleå HF	Fjällräven Center

December 28, 2010; 19:00	Timrå IK	x – x	Färjestads BK	E.ON Arena

December 28, 2010; 19:00	Södertälje SK	x – x	Djurgårdens IF	AXA Sports Center

December 28, 2010; 19:00	HV71	x – x	AIK	Kinnarps Arena

December 28, 2010; 19:00	Frölunda HC	x – x	Brynäs IF	Scandinavium

== Round 33 ==
December 30, 2010; 19:00	Luleå HF	x – x	Skellefteå AIK	Coop Norrbotten Arena

December 30, 2010; 19:00	Timrå IK	x – x	Frölunda HC	E.ON Arena

December 30, 2010; 19:00	Brynäs IF	x – x	Modo Hockey	Läkerol Arena

December 30, 2010; 19:00	Linköpings HC	x – x	AIK	Cloetta Center

December 30, 2010; 19:00	Djurgårdens IF	x – x	Färjestads BK	Hovet

December 30, 2010; 19:00	Södertälje SK	x – x	HV71	AXA Sports Center

== Round 34 ==
January 2, 2010; 16:00	Modo Hockey	5 – 2 (2–0, 1–1, 2–1)	Linköpings HC	Fjällräven Center; Attendance: 6,008

Game reference

Tuomas Tarkki
Goalies
Fredrik Norrena
Referees:
Thomas Forsström
Tobias Björk

Morten Madsen (Mattias Timander, Nicklas Danielsson) 14:51	1–0
Niklas Sundström (Hannu Pikkarainen, Anton Hedman) 17:40	2–0
Byron Ritchie (Hannu Pikkarainen, Anders Eriksson) 20:30	3–0
	3–1	29:15 (PP1) Patrik Zackrisson (M. Johansson, J. Hlinka)
Niklas Sundström (Nicklas Danielsson, Mattias Timander) 50:59	4–1
	4–2	52:41 (PP1) Jan Hlavac (Magnus Johansson, Niclas Hävelid)
Per-Åge Skröder (Niklas Sundström) (ENG) 57:33	5–2

8 min
Penalties
4 min
28
Shots
29

January 2, 2010; 16:00	Brynäs IF	2 – 0 (1–0, 0–0, 1–0)	Luleå HF	Läkerol Arena; Attendance: 5,791

Game reference
Niklas Svedberg	Goalies	David Rautio	Referee: Wolmer Edqvist
Sebastian Lauritzen (Jonas Nordquist) 17:57 / 1–0; Simon Löf (Mattias Ekholm) 52:03 / 2–0			Referee: Wolmer Edqvist
6 min	Penalties	8 min	Referee: Wolmer Edqvist
21	Shots	28	Referee: Wolmer Edqvist

January 2, 2010; 16:00	AIK	3 – 1 (0–0, 1–1, 2–0)	Luleå HF	Hovet; Attendance: 3,632

Game reference

Björn Bjurling
Goalies
Aleksis Ahlqvist
Referees:
Thomas Andersson
Mikael Nord

	0–1	31:21 (PP1) Mattias Karlsson (Tomas Skogs, Martin Röymark)
Kent McDonell (Tobias Ericsson, Fredrik Carlsson) 37:03	1–1
Stefan Johansson (Victor Ahlström, Oscar Steen) 46:34	2–1
Johan Andersson (Daniel Bång, Richard Gynge) 54:16	3–1

6 min
Penalties
14 min
40
Shots
19

January 2, 2010; 16:00	HV71	6 – 2 (2–2, 3–0, 1–0)	Djurgårdens IF	Kinnarps Arena; Attendance: 6,922

Game reference

Daniel Larsson
Goalies
Stefan Ridderwall
Referees:
Ulf Rådbjer
Niklas Lovefall

	0–1	07:04 Daniel Widing (Marcus Krüger, Mario Kempe)
Fredrik Bremberg 08:17	1–1
	1–2	13:45 Jimmie Ölvestad (David Printz, Marcus Nilsson)
Jukka Voutilainen (Pasi Puistola, Andreas Falk) 14:54	2–2
Fredrik Bremberg (Mikko Luoma, Adam Almqvist) 24:16	3–2
Fredrik Bremberg (Kamil Piros, Adam Almqvist) 27:28	4–2
Kris Beech (Mikko Luoma, Fredrik Bremberg) (PP1) 32:30	5–2
Andreas Falk (SH1) 56:32	6–2

10 min
Penalties
6 min
31
Shots
36

January 2, 2010; 16:00	Frölunda HC	4 – 0 (2–0, 0–0, 2–0)	Södertälje SK	Scandinavium; Attendance: 8,348

Game reference

Johan Holmqvist
Goalies
Riku Helenius
Referees:
Morgan Johansson
Sören Persson

Joel Lundqvist (Tomi Kallio, Oscar Hedman) 10:26	1–0
Nicklas Lasu (Mikael Johansson, Per-Johan Axelsson) 18:32	2–0
Mikko Mäenpää (Mika Pyörälä, Riku Hahl) 41:20	3–0
Mika Pyörälä (Toni Koivisto, Mikko Mäenpää) 59:10	4–0

4 min
Penalties
6 min
23
Shots
23

January 2, 2010; 18:00	Färjestads BK	3 – 2 (SO) (1–0, 1–1, 0–1, 0–0, 1–0)	Skellefteå AIK	Löfbergs Lila Arena; Attendance: 6,337

Game reference

Cristopher Nihlstorp
Goalies
Joacim Eriksson
Referees:
Christer Lärking
David Bergman

Martin Sevc (Magnus Nygren, Pelle Prestberg) (PP1) 12:29	1–0
	1–1	23:48 Martin Lundberg (Anders Söderberg, Niclas Burström)
Dragan Umicevic (A. Bastiansen, C. Berglund) (PP1) 27:17	2–1
	2–2	42:40 Anders Söderberg (Martin Lundberg, Ville Koistinen)
65:00 Mikael Johansson	3–2

6 min
Penalties
12 min
39
Shots
30
