= Pitkämäki (surname) =

Pitkämäki is a Finnish surname. Notable people with the surname include:

- Juha Pitkämäki (born 1979), Finnish ice hockey player
- Tero Pitkämäki (born 1982), Finnish javelin thrower
