= Fredrik Carlsson =

Swedish ice hockey player

- Born: November 20, 1988 (age 37) Täby, Sweden
- Height: 6 ft 5 in (196 cm)
- Weight: 209 lb (95 kg; 14 st 13 lb)
- Position: Defenceman
- Shot: Left
- Played for: AIK IF
- Playing career: 2007–2014

Fredrik Carlsson (born November 20, 1988 in Täby) is a retired Swedish professional ice hockey defenceman. While still active, he played for AIK of the Swedish Hockey League (SHL) before ending his career due to multiple concussions at the age of 25.

== Career statistics ==
			Regular season					Playoffs
Season	Team	League	GP	G	A	Pts	PIM	GP	G	A	Pts	PIM
2005–06	Stocksunds IF	J18	13	0	4	4	35	—	—	—	—	—
2006–07	AIK IF	J20	41	5	4	9	65	—	—	—	—	—
2006–07	AIK IF	Allsv	4	0	0	0	0	—	—	—	—	—
2007–08	AIK IF	J20	9	2	3	5	31	—	—	—	—	—
2007–08	AIK IF	Allsv	32	0	2	2	16	—	—	—	—	—
2008–09	AIK IF	J20	6	0	2	2	4	—	—	—	—	—
2008–09	AIK IF	Allsv	35	0	3	3	28	9	0	0	0	0
2009–10	AIK IF	Allsv	45	0	5	5	49	9	0	1	1	4
2010–11	AIK IF	SEL	54	0	6	6	6	8	0	1	1	2
2011–12	AIK IF	SEL	34	0	4	4	8	12	0	1	1	4
2012–13	AIK IF	SEL	46	1	9	10	10	—	—	—	—	—
2013–14	AIK IF	SHL	16	0	0	0	22	—	—	—	—	—
SHL totals			150	1	19	20	46	20	0	2	2	6
