= Josh MacNevin =

Canadian ice hockey player

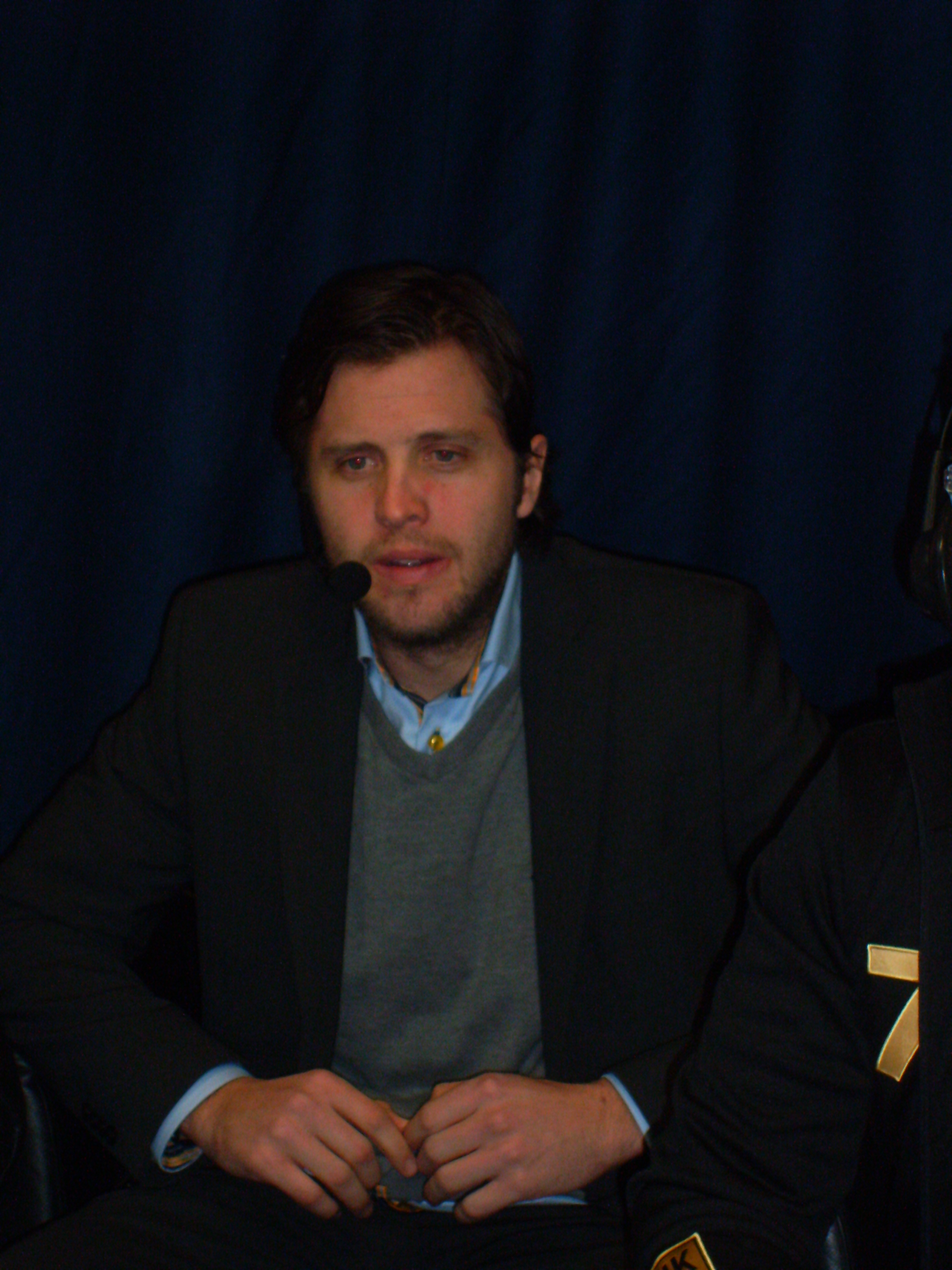
- Born: July 14, 1977 (age 48) Calgary, Alberta, Canada
- Height: 6 ft 2 in (188 cm)
- Weight: 201 lb (91 kg; 14 st 5 lb)
- Position: Defence
- Shot: Right
- Elitserien team: AIK
- NHL draft: 101st overall, 1996; New Jersey Devils
- Playing career: 2000–2013

Josh MacNevin (born July 14, 1977) is a Canadian professional ice hockey defenceman. He was selected by the New Jersey Devils in the fourth round (101st overall) of the 1996 NHL entry draft.

In his early career, MacNevin played for various minor league teams beginning with ten games for the Albany River Rats of the AHL in 1999. He later spent time in the ECHL before moving to Europe in 2001, where he began his European career in Italy for the team Fassa Falcons. MacNevin has also played one season in ERC Ingolstadt of the Deutsche Eishockey Liga (DEL) and two seasons in Växjö Lakers Hockey of the HockeyAllsvenskan. He signed to a one-year contract with AIK in 2010, which will expire after the 2010–11 Elitserien season. He was, however, lent out by AIK to HPK of the Finnish SM-liiga for a few games during the beginning of the season, for taxation reasons. He is currently an assistant coach with the Lethbridge Hurricanes of the Western Hockey League.
