= Anders Burström =

Swedish ice hockey player

- Born: January 28, 1976 (age 49); Luleå, Sweden
- Height: 6 ft 0 in (183 cm)
- Weight: 194 lb (88 kg; 13 st 12 lb)
- Position: Right wing
- Shot: Left
- Played for: Luleå HF; HPK; Jokerit; Södertälje SK
- Playing career: 1993–2011

Anders Burström (born January 28, 1976) is a Swedish former professional ice hockey player who most notably played for Luleå HF in the Swedish Hockey League. He spent ten seasons with his hometown team between 1993 and 2003. He spent one season in the SM-liiga in Finland for HPK and Jokerit before returning to Sweden, playing for Södertälje SK. In 2006, Burström returned to Luleå.
