= Hannu Pikkarainen =

Finnish ice hockey player (born 1983)

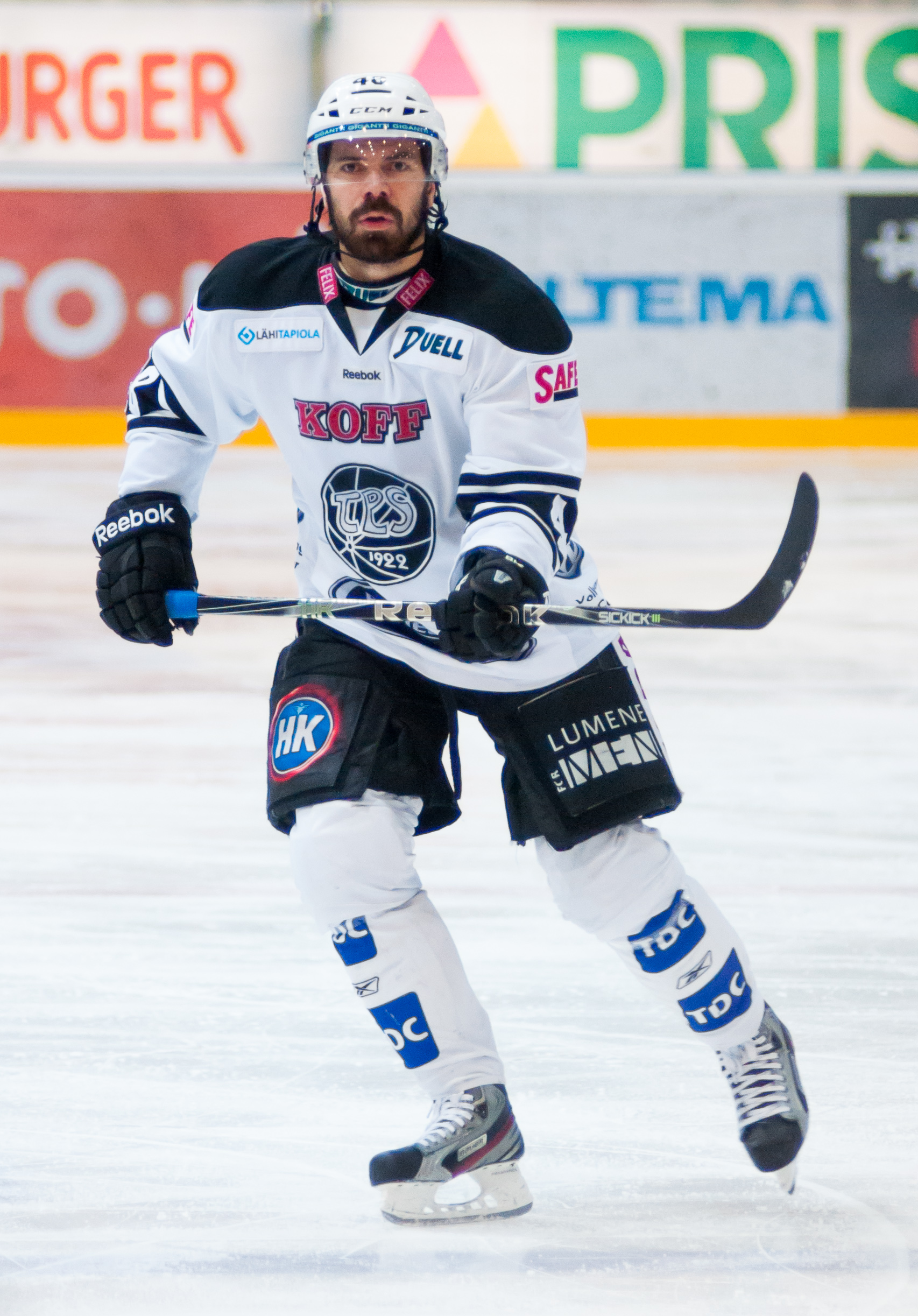
- Born: October 13, 1983 (age 42) Helsinki, Finland
- Height: 6 ft 1 in (185 cm)
- Weight: 189 lb (86 kg; 13 st 7 lb)
- Position: Defence
- Shoots: Left
- team Former teams: Free Agent; HIFK; Hartford Wolf Pack; Modo Hockey; Dinamo Minsk; Skellefteå AIK; TPS; KHL Medveščak Zagreb; Leksands IF; Schwenninger Wild Wings; Iserlohn Roosters
- NHL draft: Undrafted
- Playing career: 2002–present

Hannu Pikkarainen (born October 13, 1983) is a Finnish professional ice hockey defenceman currently an unrestricted free agent who most recently played for the Iserlohn Roosters of the Deutsche Eishockey Liga (DEL).

== Playing career ==
Pikkarainen is a product of Helsinki-based club HIFK and made his professional debut with the club in the SM-liiga during the 2002–03 season. He left HIFK to play in the American Hockey League with the Hartford Wolf Pack during the 2006-07 season. Pikkarainen saw action in seven AHL contests and played in eleven games for ECHL's Charlotte Checkers that year before returning to HIFK the following season. After another two years with HIFK, he embarked on a journeyman career including stints in the Swedish Hockey League with Modo Hockey, Skellefteå AIK, Leksands IF, two stints in the Kontinental Hockey League with HC Dynamo Minsk and Medvescak Zagreb and a stop at TPS in the Finnish Liiga, before joining back HIFK.

On May 29, 2015, Pikkarainen concluded his third stint with HIFK and signed a one-year deal with German club Schwenninger Wild Wings. When his contract was up, he agreed to terms with fellow DEL side Iserlohn Roosters inking a deal for the 2016–17 season. In 41 games with the Roosters, Pikkarainen contributed with 2 goals and 18 points as Iserlohn finished out of playoff contention. On March 3, 2017, it was announced that his contract would not be renewed.

== Criminal convictions ==
In 2022 Pikkarainen was convicted of aggravated rape and sentenced to 2 years imprisonment. In 2025 the Supreme Court of Finland confirmed the rape conviction and sentenced Pikkarainen to 1 year 9 months imprisonment.
