= Sebastian Enterfeldt =

Swedish ice hockey player

- Born: May 22, 1988 (age 37) Gävle, Sweden
- Height: 5 ft 10 in (178 cm)
- Weight: 179 lb (81 kg; 12 st 11 lb)
- Position: Centre
- Shot: Left
- Played for: Brynäs IF; Luleå HF
- Playing career: 2006–2017

Sebastian Enterfeldt (born May 22, 1988) is a Swedish former professional ice hockey player. He played with Brynäs IF and Luleå HF in the Swedish Hockey League (SHL).

Enterfeldt made his Elitserien debut playing 3 games with Brynäs IF in the 2006–07 season. He later returned to the Elitserien four seasons later with Luleå HF during the 2010–11 Elitserien season.

In the midst of the 2016–17 season having appeared in just 6 games with Brynäs IF due to a lingering arm injury initially suffered in 2014, Enterfeldt announced his retirement from professional hockey on January 27, 2017.

== Career statistics ==
			Regular season					Playoffs
Season	Team	League	GP	G	A	Pts	PIM	GP	G	A	Pts	PIM
2003–04	Brynäs IF J18	J18 Allsvenskan	4	0	0	0	0	—	—	—	—	—
2004–05	Brynäs IF J18	J18 Elit	—	—	—	—	—	—	—	—	—	—
2004–05	Brynäs IF J20	J20 SuperElit	4	0	1	1	2	—	—	—	—	—
2005–06	Brynäs IF J18	J18 Allsvenskan	1	2	1	3	0	—	—	—	—	—
2005–06	Brynäs IF J20	J20 SuperElit	37	7	27	34	92	2	0	1	1	6
2005–06	Brynäs IF	Elitserien	4	0	0	0	0	—	—	—	—	—
2006–07	Brynäs IF J20	J20 SuperElit	41	15	22	37	78	4	1	1	2	0
2006–07	Brynäs IF	Elitserien	3	0	0	0	0	—	—	—	—	—
2007–08	Almtuna IS J20	J20 Elit	—	2	3	5	12	—	—	—	—	—
2007–08	Almtuna IS	HockeyAllsvenskan	45	1	9	10	28	—	—	—	—	—
2008–09	Almtuna IS	HockeyAllsvenskan	44	9	6	15	26	3	0	1	1	0
2009–10	Almtuna IS	HockeyAllsvenskan	44	13	11	24	26	10	1	7	8	0
2010–11	Luleå HF	Elitserien	53	9	11	20	10	13	1	2	3	4
2011–12	Luleå HF	Elitserien	45	8	14	22	8	5	2	2	4	8
2012–13	Brynäs IF	Elitserien	48	13	13	26	18	4	0	1	1	4
2013–14	Brynäs IF	SHL	46	5	7	12	34	5	0	0	0	4
2014–15	Brynäs IF	SHL	23	6	7	13	6	—	—	—	—	—
2015–16	Brynäs IF	SHL	29	2	1	3	8	3	0	0	0	0
2016–17	Brynäs IF	SHL	6	1	0	1	2	—	—	—	—	—
SHL (Elitserien) totals			257	44	53	97	86	30	3	5	8	20
HockeyAllsvenskan totals			133	23	26	49	80	13	1	8	9	0
