= Anders Söderberg =

Swedish ice hockey player

- Born: October 7, 1975 (age 50) Örnsköldsvik, Sweden
- Height: 5 ft 7 in (170 cm)
- Weight: 159 lb (72 kg; 11 st 5 lb)
- Position: Left wing
- Shot: Left
- Played for: Modo Hockey; Skellefteå AIK
- NHL draft: 234th overall, 1996; Boston Bruins
- Playing career: 1993–2012

Anders Söderberg (born October 7, 1975) is a Swedish former professional ice hockey player. He was selected by the Boston Bruins in the 9th round (234th overall) of the 1996 NHL entry draft.

Anders won the Rinkens Riddare (Elitserien Gentleman of the Year award) in 2006–07.
