= Andreas Hadelöv =

Swedish ice hockey player

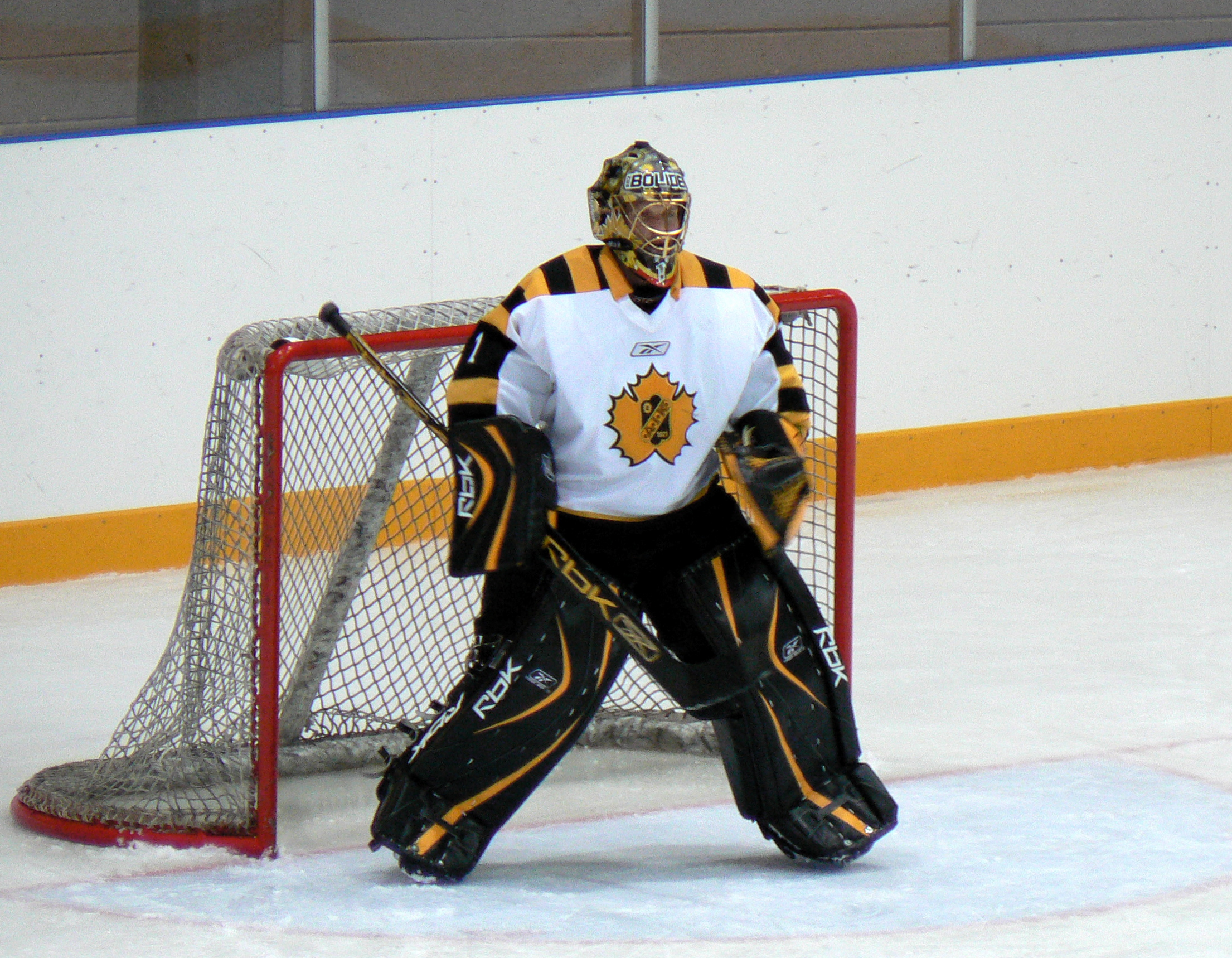
- Born: July 23, 1975 (age 49); Kiruna, SWE
- Height: 5 ft 10 in (178 cm)
- Weight: 180 lb (82 kg; 12 st 12 lb)
- Position: Goaltender
- Catches: Left
- SEL team Former teams: Skellefteå AIK; Malmö Redhawks; Djurgårdens IF
- Playing career: 1996–present

Andreas Hadelöv (born July 23, 1975) is a Swedish professional ice hockey player currently with the Skellefteå AIK team in the Swedish Elitserien league.

Hadelöv holds the record for most Elitserien games played by a goaltender, 507 as of the end of the 2020–21 season. Stefan Liv was second with 387 games played.
