= Johan Lindström (ice hockey) =

Swedish ice hockey player

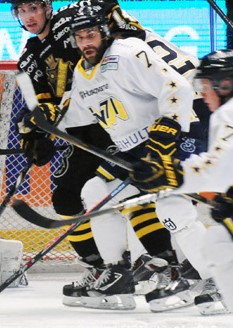
- Johan Lindström with HV71 in January 2014
- Born: March 31, 1979 (age 46) Taberg, SWE
- Height: 5 ft 10 in (178 cm)
- Weight: 202 lb (92 kg; 14 st 6 lb)
- Position: Right wing
- Shot: Right
- Played for: HV71; Linköpings HC; Mora IK
- Playing career: 1998–2015

Johan Lindström (born March 31, 1979) is a Swedish former professional ice hockey forward. After beginning his professional career with HV71 in the Swedish Elitserien during the 1997–98 season, he played 18 professional seasons with notable stints at Linköpings HC and Mora IK before announcing his retirement after a final season with HC Dalen on March 7, 2015.

The 1995–1996 and 1996–1997 seasons saw him winning the Swedish Junior Championship with HV71, while the 2007–2008 and 2009–2010 seasons saw him winning the Swedish Senior Championship with the same club.
