= Mattias Carlsson =

Swedish professional ice hockey winger

- Born: 9 February 1980 (age 45); Nyköping, Sweden
- Height: 5 ft 11 in (180 cm)
- Weight: 192 lb (87 kg; 13 st 10 lb)
- Position: Wing
- Shoots: Left
- Elitserien team Former teams: Djurgårdens IF; Södertälje SK (Elitserien); Linköpings HC (Elitserien)
- Playing career: 1998–present

Mattias Carlsson is a Swedish professional ice hockey winger who currently plays for Djurgårdens IF of the Elitserien. Carlsson previously played for Elitserien rivals Linköpings HC and Södertälje SK.
