= Oscar Steen =

Swedish ice hockey player

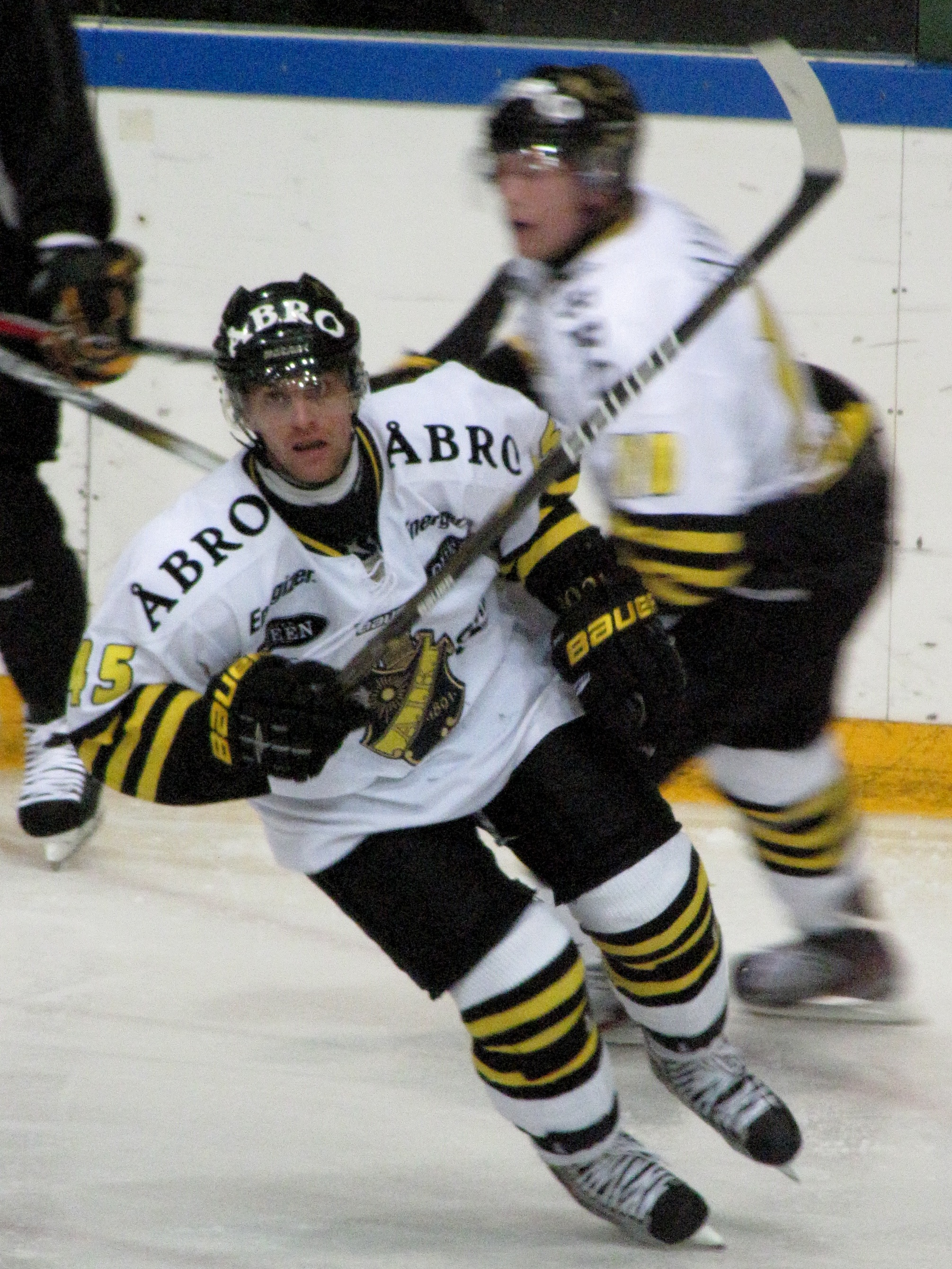
- Oscar Steen during a preseason game between AIK and Ilves in August.
- Born: 20 July 1982 (age 44) Stockholm, Sweden
- Height: 5 ft 8 in (173 cm)
- Weight: 187 lb (85 kg; 13 st 5 lb)
- Position: Centre
- Shoots: Left
- SHL team Former teams: AIK; Hammarby IF; BIK Karlskoga; Färjestads BK; Leksands IF; MoDo Hockey
- Playing career: 1999–present

Oscar Einar Steen (born 20 July 1982) is a professional Swedish ice hockey forward currently playing for AIK in the Elitserien. He has played several seasons in the Swedish Elitserien, the first playing for Färjestads BK and then for Leksands IF and MoDo. In 2007 Steen won the Swedish Championships with MoDo. In the summer of 2010, MoDo opted not to renew Steen's contract, so he signed for AIK. Steen won the Rookie of the Year award in the 2004–05 Elitserien season. Steen is the younger brother to Calle Steen.

== Career statistics ==
=== Regular season and playoffs ===
			Regular season					Playoffs
Season	Team	League	GP	G	A	Pts	PIM	GP	G	A	Pts	PIM
1999-00	Hammarby IF	J20	32	12	16	28	73	5	2	3	5	8
1999-00	Hammarby IF	Swe-2	3	0	0	0	0	2	0	0	0	0
2000-01	Hammarby IF	J20	1	1	2	3	2	-	-	-	-	-
2000-01	Hammarby IF	Swe-2	40	7	13	20	14	10	0	2	2	8
2001-02	Hammarby IF	J20	4	4	4	8	8	-	-	-	-	-
2001-02	Hammarby IF	Swe-2	40	7	14	21	10	2	0	4	4	0
2002-03	BIK Karlskoga	Swe-2	41	13	20	33	59	2	1	0	1	6
2003-04	BIK Karlskoga	Swe-2	46	8	33	41	81	5	1	6	7	8
2004-05	BIK Karlskoga	Swe-2	39	14	33	47	108	-	-	-	-	-
2004-05	Färjestad BK	SEL	8	2	2	4	8	15	1	1	2	26
2005-06	Leksands IF	SEL	44	8	13	21	42	10	2	4	6	12
2006-07	MoDo	SEL	55	8	13	21	72	20	2	4	6	40
2007-08	MoDo	SEL	53	9	22	31	63	5	1	1	2	2
2008-09	MoDo	J20	1	0	0	0	0	-	-	-	-	-
2008-09	MoDo	SEL	50	3	12	15	40	-	-	-	-	-
2009-10	MoDo	SEL	52	4	9	13	32	-	-	-	-	-
2010-11	AIK	SEL	55	10	18	28	42	8	0	2	2	2
2011-12	AIK	SEL	52	6	27	33	28	12	0	7	7	12
SEL totals			417	56	124	180	351	70	6	19	25	94
Swe-2 totals			209	49	113	162	272	21	2	12	14	22
