= Robin Lindqvist =

Swedish ice hockey player

- Born: August 16, 1987 (age 37); Boden, Sweden
- Height: 6 ft 1 in (185 cm)
- Weight: 187 lb (85 kg; 13 st 5 lb)
- Position: Centre
- Shot: Left
- Played for: Bodens IK; Luleå HF; Timrå IK; Frölunda HC
- Playing career: 2002–2013

Robin Lindqvist
Medal record

Representing Sweden

Ice hockey

World Junior U18 Championships
Bronze medal – third place	2005 Plzeň	

Robin Lindqvist (born August 16, 1987) is a retired professional Swedish ice hockey centre. He played for Bodens IK in Allsvenskan, and for Luleå HF, Timrå IK, and Frölunda HC in Elitserien (SEL).

Lindqvist, who missed the entire 2012–13 Elitserien season due to a knee injury, announce his retirement as a player on April 2, 2013.

== Career statistics ==
=== Regular season and playoffs ===
			Regular season					Playoffs
Season	Team	League	GP	G	A	Pts	PIM	GP	G	A	Pts	PIM
2002–03	Bodens IK	Allsv	1	0	0	0	0	—	—	—	—	—
2003–04	Bodens IK	Allsv	14	0	0	0	0	—	—	—	—	—
2004–05	Luleå HF	J20	30	5	6	11	10	7	2	2	4	2
2005–06	Luleå HF	J20	3	1	5	6	0	4	0	0	0	43
2005–06	Luleå HF	SEL	32	2	4	6	34	6	0	0	0	25
2006–07	Luleå HF	SEL	35	1	4	5	18	2	0	0	0	0
2007–08	Luleå HF	SEL	52	3	6	9	18	—	—	—	—	—
2008–09	Luleå HF	SEL	54	7	7	14	57	5	2	0	2	22
2009–10	Luleå HF	SEL	49	1	5	6	10	—	—	—	—	—
2010–11	Timrå IK	SEL	9	1	1	2	24	—	—	—	—	—
2010–11	Frölunda HC	SEL	45	4	4	8	20	—	—	—	—	—
2011–12	Frölunda HC	SEL	35	0	4	4	8	—	—	—	—	—
2011–12	Timrå IK	SEL	14	0	0	0	4	9	4	2	6	2
SEL totals			325	19	35	54	193	22	6	2	8	49

=== International ===
Year	Team	Event	GP	G	A	Pts	PIM
2005	Sweden Jr.	WJC U18	6	0	0	0	0
2006	Sweden Jr.	WJC	5	1	1	2	4
2007	Sweden Jr.	WJC	7	2	0	2	2
Junior int' totals			51	9	6	15	40
