= Mikael Johansson (ice hockey, born 1981) =

Swedish ice hockey player

- Born: July 17, 1981 (age 43); Gothenburg, Sweden
- Height: 6 ft 3 in (191 cm)
- Weight: 195 lb (88 kg; 13 st 13 lb)
- Position: Centre
- Shoots: Right
- SEL team Former teams: Frölunda HC; Malmö Redhawks
- Playing career: 2002–present

Mikael Mats Johansson (born July 17, 1981) is a professional Swedish professional ice hockey centre, currently playing for Frölunda HC in the Elitserien.

== Playing career ==
Frölunda signed him to a one-year contract prior to the 2007-08 season after spending the previous season with the Malmö Redhawks. He has since signed another two one-year contracts with the club and will remain for the 2009-10 season.

== Career statistics ==
=== Regular season and playoffs ===
			Regular season					Playoffs
Season	Team	League	GP	G	A	Pts	PIM	GP	G	A	Pts	PIM
2002–03	Mörrums GoIS	Allsv	41	11	9	20	85	2	1	0	1	0
2003–04	Mörrums GoIS	Allsv	44	13	13	26	26	—	—	—	—	—
2004–05	Halmstad Hammers	Allsv	30	6	20	26	16	—	—	—	—	—
2004–05	Rögle BK	Allsv	14	2	6	8	4	2	0	0	0	4
2005–06	Rögle BK	Allsv	42	11	11	22	62	10	2	0	2	6
2006–07	Malmö Redhawks	SEL	50	3	5	8	28	10	1	2	3	2
2007–08	Frölunda HC	SEL	55	6	9	15	34	7	2	1	3	0
2008–09	Frölunda HC	SEL	55	3	11	14	22	11	0	1	1	12
2009–10	Frölunda HC	SEL	55	4	11	15	14	7	0	0	0	4
2010–11	Frölunda HC	SEL	55	8	12	20	24	—	—	—	—	—
2011–12	Frölunda HC	SEL	54	8	9	17	42	5	0	1	1	2
SEL totals			324	32	57	89	164	40	3	5	8	20
