= Per Hallin =

Swedish ice hockey player

- Born: October 17, 1980 (age 45) Södertälje, SWE
- Height: 5 ft 11 in (180 cm)
- Weight: 191 lb (87 kg; 13 st 9 lb)
- Position: LW/RW
- Shoots: Left
- SEL team Former teams: Timrå IK; Södertälje SK
- NHL draft: Undrafted
- Playing career: 1998–present

Per Hallin (born October 17, 1980) is a Swedish professional ice hockey player. He is currently playing for the Timrå IK team in the Swedish Elitserien league. He is the son of former NHL player Mats Hallin.

== Playing career ==
Hallin started his career with Södertälje SK. Having been recruited to Timrå IK after the club was promoted to Elitserien 2000, he skated for the club in seven straight seasons in Elitserien. Hallin signed with his former Södertälje on April 11, 2007, while they were promoted from HockeyAllsvenskan but returned to Timrå IK again 2010. In 2012, he was made the team captain.
