= Sebastian Lauritzen =

Swedish ice hockey player

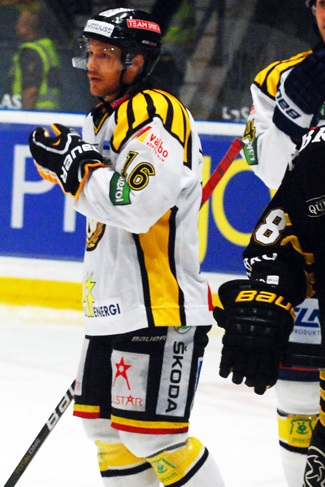
- Sebastian Lauritzen in a hockey game
- Born: September 13, 1983 (age 41); Sundsvall, SWE
- Height: 5 ft 11 in (180 cm)
- Weight: 183 lb (83 kg; 13 st 1 lb)
- Position: Left wing
- Shot: Left
- Played for: Timrå IK; Linköpings HC; Brynäs IF; Djurgårdens IF Hockey; KalPa
- NHL draft: Undrafted
- Playing career: 2002–2017

Sebastian Lauritzen is a former Swedish professional ice hockey winger.

He has played for Djurgårdens IF, Brynäs IF and Linköping HC of the SHL, Timrå IK, Bofors IK, IF Sundsvall and Växjö Lakers of the Allsvenskan and KalPa of the Finnish Elite League (Liiga).

Lauritzen made his Elitserien debut playing with Timrå IK during the 2001–02 Elitserien playoffs.

He retired on the 8th of May 2018 following the results of a concussion in August 2017.
