= Antti Halonen (ice hockey) =

Finnish ice hockey player

- Born: February 2, 1982 (age 44) Kajaani, Finland
- Height: 6 ft 0 in (183 cm)
- Weight: 203 lb (92 kg; 14 st 7 lb)
- Position: Defence
- Shoots: Left
- Liiga team Former teams: KalPa; TPS; Timrå IK
- Playing career: 2001–present

Antti Halonen (born February 2, 1982) is a Finnish professional ice hockey defenceman who currently plays for KalPa in the Finnish Liiga. Halonen returned to KalPa after two seasons with Timrå IK of the then Elitserien on April 19, 2012.

== Career statistics ==
			Regular season					Playoffs
Season	Team	League	GP	G	A	Pts	PIM	GP	G	A	Pts	PIM
1997–98	Hokki U16	U16 SM-sarja	22	13	17	30	40	—	—	—	—	—
1998–99	Lukko U20	U20 SM-liiga	25	0	2	2	30	—	—	—	—	—
1999–00	Lukko U18	U18 SM-sarja	14	4	10	14	34	—	—	—	—	—
1999–00	Lukko U20	U20 SM-liiga	26	2	4	6	32	8	0	0	0	14
2000–01	Lukko U20	U20 SM-liiga	44	9	22	31	80	3	0	1	1	4
2001–02	KalPa U20	U20 SM-liiga	16	3	11	14	28	—	—	—	—	—
2001–02	KalPa	Mestis	23	0	1	1	32	—	—	—	—	—
2002–03	Hokki	Mestis	37	0	2	2	51	2	0	0	0	4
2002–03	UJK	Mestis	3	0	0	0	0	—	—	—	—	—
2003–04	Hokki	Mestis	41	5	8	13	116	4	0	0	0	4
2004–05	Hokki	Mestis	42	7	7	14	87	4	0	0	0	10
2005–06	Hokki	Mestis	39	2	7	9	62	9	0	1	1	39
2006–07	Hokki	Mestis	27	3	11	14	50	12	0	6	6	16
2007–08	HC TPS	SM-liiga	53	2	8	10	104	2	0	0	0	4
2008–09	HC TPS	SM-liiga	55	5	3	8	128	7	0	0	0	8
2009–10	HC TPS	SM-liiga	56	6	14	20	119	15	2	0	2	16
2010–11	Timrå IK	Elitserien	44	2	10	12	71	—	—	—	—	—
2011–12	Timrå IK	Elitserien	36	0	3	3	52	6	0	1	1	8
2012–13	KalPa	SM-liiga	50	3	13	16	44	2	0	0	0	0
2013–14	KalPa	Liiga	19	0	2	2	37	—	—	—	—	—
2014–15	KalPa	Liiga	40	2	0	2	67	5	0	1	1	2
2015–16	KalPa	Liiga	29	4	3	7	26	—	—	—	—	—
SM-liiga totals			302	22	43	65	525	31	2	1	3	30
Mestis totals			212	17	36	53	398	31	0	7	7	73
