= Martin Ševc =

Czech professional ice hockey player (born 1981)

- Born: 23 September 1981 (age 44) Kladno, Czechoslovakia
- Height: 5 ft 11 in (180 cm)
- Weight: 176 lb (80 kg; 12 st 8 lb)
- Position: Defence
- Shoots: Left
- SHL team Former teams: Skellefteå AIK; HC Kladno; Färjestads BK; HC Dinamo Minsk; HC Plzeň; HC Lev Praha
- National team: Czech Republic
- Playing career: 2001–present

Martin Ševc (born 23 September 1981 in Czechoslovakia) is a Czech professional ice hockey player. He is currently a defenceman for Skellefteå AIK in the Swedish Hockey League (SHL).

== Playing career ==
In January 2006 he and HC Kladno teammate Pavel Patera were loaned to the Swedish Elitserien team Färjestads BK for the rest of the season. Ševc helped Färjestad win their seventh championship in April 2006. After that, he returned home to the Czech league.

He later signed a contract with Färjestads BK for the 2008–09 season. He just stayed one season in Färjestad before signing with HC Dinamo Minsk of the Kontinental Hockey League for the 2009–10 season. After 40 games with Minsk, scoring 9 assists and 10 points in 40 games, he signed again with Färjestad to return to Karlstad for the 2010–11 season. He helped claim the Swedish championship for a second time with Färjestad. In 2013 he claimed his third title in helping Skellefteå AIK win the Swedish Championship.

In the 2013–14 season, Ševc returned to the Czech Republic, to play for HC Lev Praha in the KHL. In 51 games, he complied 21 points and reached the Gagarin Cup finals in the post-season. With an impressive debut season in Praha, Ševc was re-signed to a two-year contract extension on 18 June 2014. However, with the announcement just little over a week later that Lev Praha would not participate the following season due to financial bankruptcy, Ševc settled with Praha to be released as a free agent and opted for a return with Skellefteå on a one-year contract on 10 July 2014.
