= Magnus Åkerlund =

Swedish ice hockey player (born 1986)

- Born: April 25, 1986 (age 40) Osby, SWE
- Height: 6 ft 2 in (188 cm)
- Weight: 185 lb (84 kg; 13 st 3 lb)
- Position: Goaltender
- Catches: Right
- Allsv team Former teams: IF Sundsvall; HV71; Timrå IK; Aalborg Pirates
- NHL draft: 137th overall, 2004; Carolina Hurricanes
- Playing career: 2004–present

Magnus Åkerlund (born April 25, 1986) is a Swedish professional ice hockey goaltender, currently playing with IF Sundsvall in the HockeyAllsvenskan. He has previously played in the top Swedish Hockey League with HV71 and Timrå IK. He was selected 137th overall by the Carolina Hurricanes in the 2004 NHL entry draft.

He joined IF Sundsvall in the HockeyAllsvenskan after two seasons in the Danish Metal Ligaen with the Aalborg Pirates on June 16, 2014.
