= Fredric Andersson =

Swedish professional ice hockey player

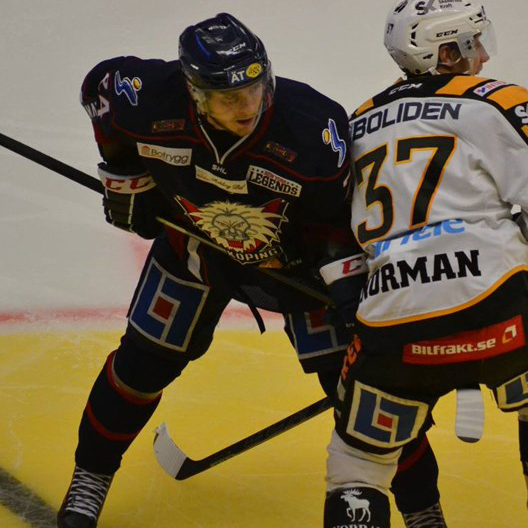
- Born: October 13, 1988 (age 36); Gnesta, Sweden
- Height: 5 ft 11 in (180 cm)
- Weight: 199 lb (90 kg; 14 st 3 lb)
- Position: Left wing
- Shot: Left
- Played for: Södertälje SK; Modo Hockey; Linköpings HC; Örebro HK; Frederikshavn White Hawks
- Playing career: 2006–2025

Fredric Leif Olof Andersson (born October 13, 1988) is a Swedish former professional ice hockey player.

Andersson formerly played with Södertälje SK and Modo Hockey in the Elitserien. He has also appeared in the top tier SHL with Linköpings HC and Örebro HK.

Andersson captained IF Björklöven in the HockeyAllsvenskan (Allsv) for seven seasons before ending his 19 year professional playing career with Danish club, Frederikshavn White Hawks of the Metal Ligaen in 2024–25 season.
