= Lukas Kilström =

Swedish ice hockey player

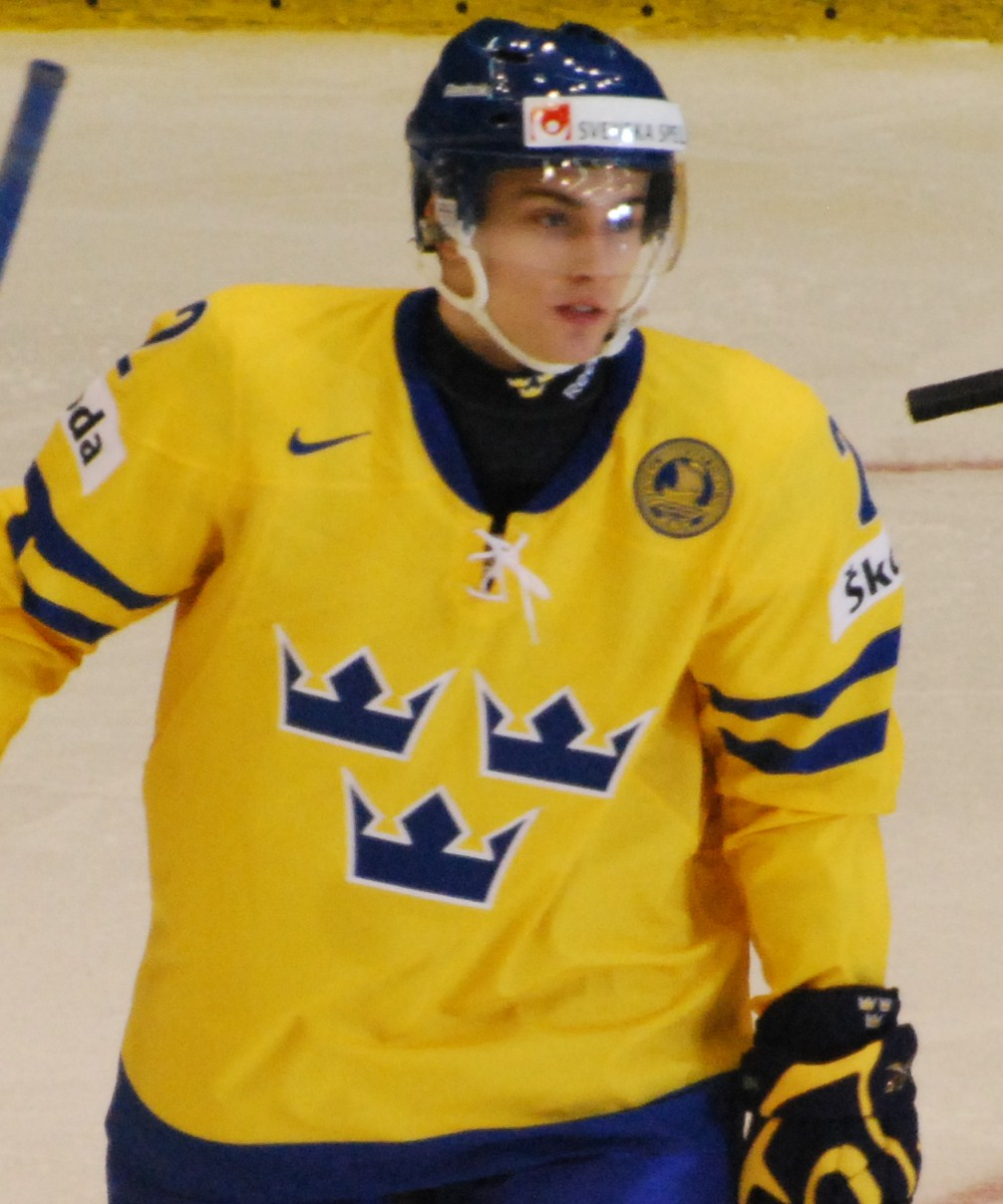
- Born: April 18, 1990 (age 35); Södertälje, Sweden
- Height: 6 ft 0 in (183 cm)
- Weight: 187 lb (85 kg; 13 st 5 lb)
- Position: Defence
- Shot: Left
- Played for: Södertälje SK; Luleå HF; Brynäs IF
- Playing career: 2008–2020

Medal record

Representing Sweden

Ice hockey

World Junior Championships
Bronze medal – third place	2010 Canada	

Lukas Kilström (born April 18, 1990) is a Swedish professional ice hockey defenseman currently playing for Brynäs IF of the Swedish Hockey League (SHL).

== Playing career ==
Kilström has played in Södertälje SK's junior team and two seasons in Södertälje's A-team. He made his professional debut with Södertälje SK in the Elitserien during the 2008–09 season.

After the 2010–11 season, following Södertälje's relegation out of the Elite, he chose to remain in the league in signing a two-year contract with Lulea HF

== Career statistics ==
			Regular season					Playoffs
Season	Team	League	GP	G	A	Pts	PIM	GP	G	A	Pts	PIM
2005–06	Södertälje SK U16	U16 SM	3	1	0	1	18	—	—	—	—	—
2006–07	Södertälje SK J18	J18 Allsvenskan	12	1	2	3	22	—	—	—	—	—
2007–08	Södertälje SK J18	J18 Elit	13	5	6	11	37	—	—	—	—	—
2007–08	Södertälje SK J18	J18 Allsvenskan	7	2	3	5	16	2	0	1	1	0
2007–08	Södertälje SK J20	J20 SuperElit	13	2	4	6	29	—	—	—	—	—
2008–09	Södertälje SK J20	J20 SuperElit	40	5	12	17	89	2	0	0	0	0
2008–09	Södertälje SK	Elitserien	1	0	0	0	0	—	—	—	—	—
2009–10	Södertälje SK J20	J20 SuperElit	8	3	2	5	4	—	—	—	—	—
2009–10	Södertälje SK	Elitserien	38	1	3	4	32	—	—	—	—	—
2010–11	Södertälje SK	Elitserien	50	2	11	13	43	—	—	—	—	—
2011–12	Luleå HF	Elitserien	39	1	3	4	16	5	0	0	0	0
2012–13	Luleå HF	Elitserien	49	5	11	16	53	14	0	1	1	10
2013–14	Brynäs IF	SHL	34	0	11	11	20	5	0	0	0	4
2014–15	Brynäs IF	SHL	50	0	6	6	28	6	0	0	0	4
2015–16	Brynäs IF	SHL	45	4	11	15	67	3	0	1	1	4
2016–17	Brynäs IF	SHL	48	2	10	12	14	20	1	0	1	14
2017–18	Brynäs IF	SHL	50	2	7	9	53	3	0	1	1	2
2018–19	Brynäs IF	SHL	29	1	4	5	20	—	—	—	—	—
2019–20	Brynäs IF	SHL	30	2	4	6	18	—	—	—	—	—
SHL (Elitserien) totals			463	20	81	101	364	56	1	3	4	38
