= Juha Pitkämäki =

Finnish ice hockey player

- Born: December 4, 1979 (age 46) Tampere, Finland
- Height: 6 ft 0 in (183 cm)
- Weight: 181 lb (82 kg; 12 st 13 lb)
- Position: Goaltender
- Caught: Left
- Played for: Ilves; JYP; Mora IK; HIFK; Timrå IK; AaB Ishockey
- Playing career: 2000–2012

Juha Pitkämäki (born December 4, 1979) is a Finnish retired professional ice hockey goaltender.

Pitkämäki played in the SM-liiga for Ilves, JYP and HIFK. He also played in Elitserien for Mora IK and Timrå IK and the Danish Ligaen for AaB Ishockey.
