= 2011–12 Färjestad BK season =

Swedish ice hockey club season

2011–12 Färjestad BK
- League: Regular: 6th Playoffs: SHL
- 2011–12 record: 23–18–14
- Home record: 14–4–10
- Road record: 9–14–4
- Goals for: 124
- Goals against: 124

Team information
- General manager: Thomas Rundqvist
- Coach: Leif Carlsson
- Assistant coach: Jörgen Jönsson; Andreas Johansson; Erik Granqvist
- Captain: Rickard Wallin
- Alternate captains: Jonas Frögren; Sanny Lindström
- Arena: Löfbergs Lila Arena
- Average attendance: 6,589

Team leaders
- Goals: Christian Berglund (16)
- Assists: Mikael Johansson (31)
- Points: Mikael Johansson (39)
- Penalty minutes: Martin Ševc (118)
- Wins: Cristopher Nihlstorp (24)
- Goals against average: Cristopher Nihlstorp (2.04)

The 2011–12 Färjestad BK season was Färjestad's 37th season in the top tier Swedish league Elitserien (SEL). The regular season began on September 15, 2011 at home against Skellefteå AIK and is scheduled to end on March 6, 2012 on away ice against Frölunda HC. The 2011–12 season sees Färjestad attempting to defend their Swedish championship title from the previous season.

== Summary ==
Färjestad was the only team in the league without a win in regulation time (60 minutes) after the first 11 games, having faced all teams in the league once. Färjestad were also located on the 12th and final spot with only 8 points in the standings at that time. This brought Niklas Czarnecki's head-coaching position for the club into question by many experts, although Czarnecki remained in the club at that time. In their 12th game of the season, where they met Frölunda on 15 October 2011 at Löfbergs Lila Arena, Färjestad took an inevitable 2–1 win in front of 7,566 spectators and also took their first regulation-time win of the season, advancing to the 11th spot in the standings. This began what would become a five-game winning streak, before losing 1–5 against HV71 at home ice on 29 October.

On 13 October 2011, new Färjestad forward Hannes Hyvönen received a match penalty when he illegally made a hit to the head of Per Hallin to the boards in a home game against Timrå. As a consequence, Hyvönen was suspended for three games and fined 14,000 SEK. Just two weeks later, on 29 October, Czech defenceman Martin Ševc also received a match penalty, was suspended for three games and had to pay an 18,000 SEK fine after making hate speech against HV71 defenceman Daniel Rahimi. One week later, Färjestad received their third suspension of the season when defenceman Sanny Lindström was suspended for two games and forced to pay a 20,000 SEK fine for hitting Modo player Janos Hari to the head on 5 November 2011.

After a three-game streak of losses between 7–14 January 2012, Färjestad dropped in the standings and fell closer to the line for playoff qualification. As a result, head coach Czarnecki was fired. One of the team's assistant coaches at that time, Leif Carlsson, took over. Andreas Johansson took over Carlsson's former position as one of the assistant coaches.

Färjestad finished 6th in the regular season and were facing 3rd-seeded HV71 in the quarterfinals. Färjestad came out on top in six games and advanced to the semifinals, where they are playing against 4th-seeded Brynäs IF

== Regular season ==
=== Standings ===
2011–12 Elitserien season	GP	W	L	OTW	OTL	GF	GA	GD	Pts
Luleå HF^{y}	55	25	13	8	9	128	104	+24	100
Skellefteå AIK^{x}	55	26	17	5	7	148	125	+23	95
HV71^{x}	55	22	16	9	8	151	130	+21	92
Brynäs IF^{x}	55	25	19	6	5	148	140	+8	92
Frölunda HC^{x}	55	22	17	8	8	140	113	+27	90
Färjestad BK^{x}	55	23	18	4	10	124	124	0	87
AIK^{x}	55	19	19	8	9	146	132	+14	82
Modo Hockey^{x}	55	19	22	8	6	146	147	–1	79
Växjö Lakers HC^{e}	55	18	22	8	7	124	133	–9	77
Linköpings HC^{e}	55	17	24	7	7	120	138	–18	72
Djurgårdens IF^{r}	55	15	23	10	7	123	144	–21	72
Timrå IK^{r}	55	10	31	8	6	115	183	–68	52

x – clinched playoff spot; y – clinched regular season league title; e – eliminated from playoff contention; r – play in relegation series

=== Game log ===
2011–12 Elitserien games log; 23–18–14 (Home: 14–4–10; Away: 9–14–4)

September: 0–3–3 (Home: 0–1–3; Away: 0–2–0)
Round	Date	Opponent	Score	OT	Goaltender	Venue	Attendance	Record	Pts
1	September 15	Skellefteå AIK	3–2	SO	Nihlstorp	Löfbergs Lila Arena	6,029	0–0–1	2
2	September 17	AIK	1–2	SO	Pettersson-Wentzel	Löfbergs Lila Arena	6,281	0–0–2	3
3	September 22	HV71	2–6		Nihlstorp	Kinnarps Arena	6,786	0–1–2	3
4	September 24	Brynäs IF	1–4		Pettersson-Wentzel	Löfbergs Lila Arena	5,616	0–2–2	3
5	September 27	Luleå HF	0–2		Nihlstorp	Coop Norrbotten Arena	4,469	0–3–2	3
6	September 29	Djurgårdens IF	2–3	SO	Nihlstorp	Löfbergs Lila Arena	5,163	0–3–3	4

October: 4–2–5 (Home: 2–1–2; Away: 2–1–3)
Round	Date	Opponent	Score	OT	Goaltender	Venue	Attendance	Record	Pts
7	October 1	Modo Hockey	2–3	SO	Nihlstorp	Fjällräven Center	5,906	0–3–4	5
8	October 4	Frölunda HC	3–2	OT	Nihlstorp	Scandinavium	11,296	0–3–5	7
9	October 6	Växjö Lakers HC	2–3	SO	Nihlstorp	Löfbergs Lila Arena	5,184	0–3–6	8
10	October 11	Linköpings HC	0–1		Nihlstorp	Cloetta Center	5,884	0–4–6	8
11	October 13	Timrå IK	2–3	SO	Nihlstorp	Löfbergs Lila Arena	5,406	0–4–7	9
12	October 15	Frölunda HC	2–1		Nihlstorp	Löfbergs Lila Arena	7,566	1–4–7	12
13	October 20	Timrå IK	2–1		Nihlstorp	E.ON Arena	4,636	2–4–7	15
14	October 22	Växjö Lakers HC	4–1		Nihlstorp	Vida Arena	5,287	3–4–7	18
15	October 25	Linköpings HC	3–0		Nihlstorp	Löfbergs Lila Arena	6,395	4–4–7	21
16	October 27	Skellefteå AIK	3–2	SO	Pettersson-Wentzel	Skellefteå Kraft Arena	4,527	4–4–8	23
17	October 29	HV71	1–5		Nihlstorp	Löfbergs Lila Arena	8,381	4–5–8	23

November: 5–3–1 (Home: 3–0–1; Away: 2–3–0)
Round	Date	Opponent	Score	OT	Goaltender	Venue	Attendance	Record	Pts
18	November 1	Luleå HF	2–1		Nihlstorp	Löfbergs Lila Arena	7,342	5–5–8	26
19	November 3	AIK	2–3		Pettersson-Wentzel	Hovet	4,602	5–6–8	26
20	November 5	Modo Hockey	3–1		Nihlstorp	Löfbergs Lila Arena	7,889	6–6–8	29
21	November 16	Djurgårdens IF	1–5		Nihlstorp	Hovet	7,125	6–7–8	29
22	November 18	Brynäs IF	1–0		Nihlstorp	Läkerol Arena	7,153	7–7–8	32
30	November 21	Linköpings HC	1–2		Nihlstorp	Cloetta Center	7,294	7–8–8	32
23	November 24	Växjö Lakers HC	6–4		Nihlstorp	Löfbergs Lila Arena	5,440	8–8–8	35
24	November 26	Brynäs IF	2–3	SO	Nihlstorp	Löfbergs Lila Arena	7,268	8–8–9	36
25	November 28	Frölunda HC	4–1		Pettersson-Wentzel	Scandinavium	12,044	9–8–9	39

December: 5–1–1 (Home: 2–0–1; Away: 3–1–0)
Round	Date	Opponent	Score	OT	Goaltender	Venue	Attendance	Record	Pts
26	December 1	Timrå IK	2–3	OT	Pettersson-Wentzel	Löfbergs Lila Arena	5,407	9–8–10	40
27	December 3	Modo Hockey	5–3		Nihlstorp	Fjällräven Center	6,429	10–8–10	43
28	December 5	HV71	3–1		Nihlstorp	Kinnarps Arena	6,602	11–8–10	46
29	December 8	AIK	6–3		Nihlstorp	Löfbergs Lila Arena	7,771	12–8–10	49
32	December 26	Skellefteå AIK	3–1		Nihlstorp	Löfbergs Lila Arena	8,066	13–8–10	52
33	December 28	Luleå HF	3–5		Pettersson-Wentzel	Coop Norrbotten Arena	5,569	13–9–10	52
34	December 30	Timrå IK	6–3		Pettersson-Wentzel	E.ON Arena	4,026	14–9–10	55

January: 2–5–3 (Home: 2–1–2; Away: 0–4–1)
35	January 5	HV71	2–1	OT	Nihlstorp	Löfbergs Lila Arena	7,848	14–9–11	57
36	January 7	Brynäs IF	1–4		Nihlstorp	Läkerol Arena	8,050	14–10–11	57
37	January 12	Modo Hockey	1–2		Nihlstorp	Löfbergs Lila Arena	6,410	14–11–11	57
38	January 14	Växjö Lakers HC	1–4		Nihlstorp	Vida Arena	5,306	14–12–11	57
39	January 19	AIK	0–3		Nihlstorp	Hovet	4,565	14–13–11	57
40	January 21	Linköpings HC	2–3	OT	Pettersson-Wentzel	Löfbergs Lila Arena	7,067	14–13–12	58
41	January 24	Djurgårdens IF	1–2	SO	Nihlstorp	Hovet	7,170	14–13–13	59
42	January 27	Luleå HF	3–1		Nihlstorp	Löfbergs Lila Arena	5,781	15–13–13	62
31	January 29	Djurgårdens IF	1–0		Pettersson-Wentzel	Löfbergs Lila Arena	6,468	16–13–13	65
43	January 31	Skellefteå AIK	0–2		Pettersson-Wentzel	Skellefteå Kraft Arena	4,751	16–14–13	65

February: 6–2–1 (Home: 5–0–1; Away: 1–2–0)
44	February 2	Frölunda HC	2–3	SO	Nihlstorp	Löfbergs Lila Arena	6,412	16–14–14	66
45	February 4	Skellefteå AIK	3–0		Nihlstorp	Löfbergs Lila Arena	7,355	17–14–14	69
46	February 14	Linköpings HC	0–1		Nihlstorp	Cloetta Center	7,009	17–15–14	69
47	February 16	Brynäs IF	4–1		Nihlstorp	Löfbergs Lila Arena	6,586	18–15–14	72
48	February 18	Modo Hockey	3–0		Nihlstorp	Fjällräven Center	7,201	19–15–14	75
49	February 21	Djurgårdens IF	3–0		Nihlstorp	Löfbergs Lila Arena	6,317	20–15–14	78
50	February 23	AIK	3–1		Nihlstorp	Löfbergs Lila Arena	5,652	21–15–14	81
51	February 25	Luleå HF	1–4		Nihlstorp	Coop Norrbotten Arena	5,196	21–16–14	81
52	February 28	Växjö Lakers HC	3–2		Nihlstorp	Löfbergs Lila Arena	5,774	22–16–14	84

March: 1–2–0 (Home: 0–1–0; Away: 1–1–0)
53	March 1	HV71	3–6	Pettersson-Wentzel	Kinnarps Arena	6,902	22–17–14	84
54	March 3	Timrå IK	2–3	Pettersson-Wentzel	Löfbergs Lila Arena	7,642	22–18–14	84
55	March 6	Frölunda HC	3–2	Nihlstorp	Scandinavium	11,839	23–18–14	87

Legend: Win Overtime/Shootout win (2 points) Loss (0 points) Overtime/Shootout loss (1 point)

== Playoffs ==
=== Game log ===
2011–12 Elitserien playoffs log; 5–5 (Home: 2–3; Away: 3–2)

Quarterfinals vs. (3) HV71; 4–2 (Home: 2–1; Away: 2–1)
Round	Date	Score	Goaltender	Venue	Attendance	Series
1	March 11	4–1	Nihlstorp	Kinnarps Arena	6,774	1–0
2	March 13	3–1	Nihlstorp	Löfbergs Lila Arena	6,276	2–0
3	March 15	3–4 OT	Pettersson-Wentzel	Kinnarps Arena	7,000	2–1
4	March 17	3–5	Pettersson-Wentzel	Löfbergs Lila Arena	8,605	2–2
5	March 19	5–3	Nihlstorp	Kinnarps Arena	7,000	3–2
6	March 21	2–0	Nihlstorp	Löfbergs Lila Arena	7,549	4–2

Semifinals vs. (4) Brynäs IF; 1–3 (Home: 0–2; Away: 1–1)
Round	Date	Score	Goaltender	Venue	Attendance	Series
1	March 26	3–2 OT	Pettersson-Wentzel	Läkerol Arena	6,670	1–0
2	March 28	2–4	Pettersson-Wentzel	Löfbergs Lila Arena	7,238	1–1
3	March 30	2–4	Pettersson-Wentzel	Läkerol Arena	8,407	1–2
4	April 1	0–3	Pettersson-Wentzel	Löfbergs Lila Arena	8,550	1–3
5	April 3	–		Läkerol Arena
6*	April 5	–		Löfbergs Lila Arena
7*	April 7	–		Läkerol Arena

Legend: Win Loss
Asterisks (*) indicate games that are only played if needed.

== Transactions ==
Acquired
Player	Former team	Notes
Niklas Czarnecki	Brynäs IF	Coach
Fredrik Pettersson-Wentzel	Almtuna IS	
Luca Boltshauser	ZSC Lions	Also joining under-20 team
Johan Larsson	Bofors IK	
Joakim Hillding	Växjö Lakers HC	
Peter Wennerström	Bofors IK	
Hannes Hyvönen	Ak Bars Kazan	
Stefan Meyer	Abbotsford Heat	

Leaving
Player	New team	Notes
Tommy Samuelsson	Vienna Capitals	Coach
Alexander Salak	Chicago Blackhawks	
Andro Michel	Örebro HK	
Jonas Junland	Barys Astana	
Markus Karlsson	Borås HC	
Dick Axelsson	Modo Hockey	
Emil Kåberg	Örebro HK	
Pelle Prestberg	Leksands IF	

== Roster ==
Updated February 14, 2012.

No.	Nat	Player	Pos	S/G	Age	Acquired	Birthplace
22	(Sweden)	Per Åslund	C/LW	L	40	2006	Kil, Sweden
20	(Norway)	Anders Bastiansen	C	L	46	2008	Oslo, Norway
71	(Sweden)	Christian Berglund	LW	L	46	2010	Uppsala, Sweden
16	(Sweden)	Kristofer Berglund	D	L	38	2010	Umeå, Sweden
25	(Sweden)	Jonas Brodin	D	L	33	2008	Karlstad, Sweden
24	(Sweden)	Jonas Frögren (A)	D	L	46	2010	Ludvika, Sweden
73	(Sweden)	Anton Grundel	D	R	36	2006	Karlstad, Sweden
42	(Sweden)	Joakim Hillding	C	L	38	2011	Ängelholm, Sweden
12	(Norway)	Marius Holtet	LW	R	42	2008	Oslo, Norway
23	(Finland)	Hannes Hyvönen	RW	R	51	2011	Oulu, Finland
85	(Sweden)	Mikael Johansson	C/LW	L	41	2010	Arvika, Sweden
7	(Sweden)	Oscar Klefbom	D	L	33	2008	Karlstad, Sweden
6	(Sweden)	Johan Larsson	D	R	40	2011	Lindesberg, Sweden
8	(Sweden)	Sanny Lindström (A)	D	L	46	2009	Huddinge, Sweden
79	(Sweden)	Patrik Lundh	LW/C	L	38	2010	Stockholm, Sweden
14	(Canada)	Stefan Meyer	LW	L	41	2011	Medicine Hat, Alberta, Canada
41	(Sweden)	Cristopher Nihlstorp	G	R	42	2010	Malmö, Sweden
32	(Sweden)	Magnus Nygren	D	R	36	2007	Karlstad, Sweden
30	(Sweden)	Marcus Paulsson	LW	L	42	2009	Karlskrona, Sweden
35	(Sweden)	Fredrik Pettersson-Wentzel	G	L	35	2011	Uppsala, Sweden
55	(Czech Republic)	Martin Sevc	D	L	45	2010	Kladno, Czechoslovakia
11	(Sweden)	Mattias Sjögren	C	L	38	2011	Landskrona, Sweden
18	(Sweden)	Robin Sterner	C	L	36	2006	Helsingborg, Sweden
28	(Sweden)	Erik Thorell	LW	L	34	2007	Karlstad, Sweden
51	(Sweden)	Rickard Wallin (C)	C	L	46	2010	Stockholm, Sweden
