= List of Färjestad BK seasons =

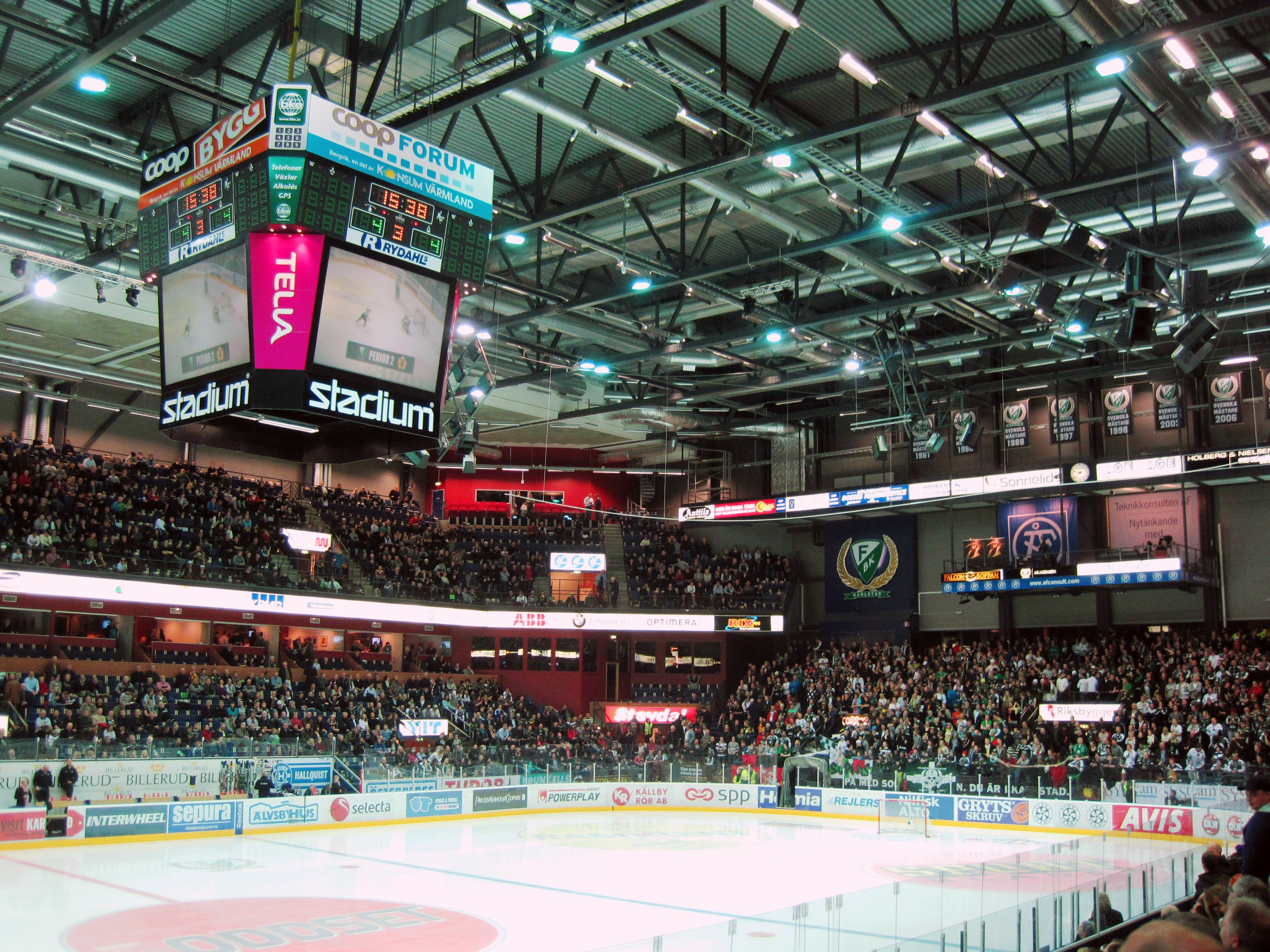
Färjestad BK playing at Löfbergs Arena.

This is a list of seasons completed by the Färjestad BK ice hockey franchise of the Swedish Hockey League (SHL). Färjestad has had 21 Swedish Championship final appearances, winning ten times since the Swedish Hockey League (SHL; formerly Elitserien) was started in 1975, making them the most successful SHL club in history.

== Season-by-season results ==
Season	Level	Division	Record		Avg. home atnd.	Notes
Season	Level	Division	Position	W-T-L W-OT-L W-OTW-OTL-L	Avg. home atnd.	Notes
2007–08	Tier 1	Elitserien	4th	25–11–19	7,000	Top scorer: (Sweden) R. Wallin (40 pts); Top goalie: (Sweden) J. Gustavsson (91.93 SV%)
2007–08	Swedish Championship playoffs		—	5–0–0–7	7,423	Won in quarterfinals against Frölunda (4–3); Lost in semifinals against Linköping (1–4)
2008–09	Tier 1	Elitserien	1st	30–8–17	6,577	Top scorer: (Sweden) R. Wallin (45 pts); Top goalie: (Sweden) J. Gustavsson (93.15 SV%)
2008–09	Swedish Championship playoffs		—	12–0–0–1	8,070	Won in quarterfinals against Brynäs (4–0); Won in semifinals against Skellefteå (4–0); Won in finals against HV71 (4–1); (gold) 2009 Swedish Champions (8th title)
2009–10	Tier 1	Elitserien	5th	25–7–0–20	6,784	Top scorer: (Sweden) D. Umičević (36 pts); Top goalie: (Sweden) H. Karlsson (91.39 SV%)
2009–10	Swedish Championship playoffs		—	2–1–1–3	6,313	Lost in quarterfinals against Skellefteå (3–4)
2010–11	Tier 1	Elitserien	2nd	27–6–3–19	6,785	Top scorer: (Sweden) P. Prestberg (36 pts); Top goalie: (Czech Republic) A. Salák (92.64 SV%)
2010–11	Swedish Championship playoffs		—	10–2–2–0	7,719	Won in quarterfinals against Brynäs (4–1); Won in semifinals against AIK (4–0); Won in finals against Skellefteå (4–1); (gold) 2011 Swedish Champions (9th title)
2011–12	Tier 1	Elitserien	6th	23–4–10–18	6,590	Top scorer: (Sweden) M. Johansson (39 pts); Top goalie: (Sweden) C. Nihlstorp (92.80 SV%)
2011–12	Swedish Championship playoffs		—	4–1–1–5	7,644	Won in quarterfinals against HV71 (4–2); Lost in semifinals against Brynäs (1–4)
2012–13	Tier 1	Elitserien	2nd	27–7–7–14	6,209	Top scorer: (Canada) C. Lee (41 pts); Top goalie: (Czech Republic) A. Salák (93.92 SV%)
2012–13	Swedish Championship playoffs		—	4–1–3–2	7,232	Won in quarterfinals against Modo (4–1); Lost in semifinals against Luleå (1–4)
2013–14	Tier 1	SHL	5th	21–7–8–19	5,963	Top scorer: (Sweden) J. Hillding (41 pts); Top goalie: (Sweden) F. Pettersson-Wentzel (92.64 SV%)
2013–14	Swedish Championship playoffs		—	6–2–1–6	7,625	Won in quarterfinals against Brynäs (4–1); Won in semifinals against Växjö (4–2); (silver) Lost in finals against Skellefteå (0–4)
2014–15	Tier 1	SHL	7th	21–6–8–20	5,992	Top scorer: (Czech Republic) M. Gulaš (40 pts); Top goalie: (Canada) J. Pogge (92.60 SV%)
2014–15	Tier 1	Playoff qualifier	—	0–1–1–1	5,633	Lost playoff qualifier against Brynäs (1–2)
2015–16	Tier 1	SHL	5th	20–10–9–13	6,122	Top scorer: (Czech Republic) M. Gulaš (45 pts); Top goalie: (Canada) J. Pogge (92.20 SV%)
2015–16	Swedish Championship playoffs		—	1–0–0–4	7,262	Lost in quarterfinals against Luleå (1–4)
2016–17	Tier 1	SHL	7th	22–9–3–18	6,241	Top scorer: (Sweden) J. Ryno (36 pts); Top goalie: (Norway) L. Haugen (92.50 SV%)
2016–17	Swedish Championship playoffs		—	2–0–2–3	6,824	Won in eighthfinals against Djurgården (2–1); Lost in quarterfinals against HV71 (0–4)
2017–18	Tier 1	SHL	4th	23–6–6–17	7,233	Top scorer: (Sweden) J. Ryno (46 pts); Top goalie: (Norway) L. Haugen (91.50 SV%)
2017–18	Swedish Championship playoffs		—	1–0–0–4	7,133	Lost in quarterfinals against Skellefteå (2–4)
2018–19	Tier 1	SHL	1st	28–6–5–13	7,231	Top scorer: (Finland) J. Virtanen (41 pts); Top goalie: (Sweden) A. Werner (92.60 SV%)
2018–19	Swedish Championship playoffs		—	6–1–1–6	7,894	Won in quarterfinals against HV71 (4–3); Lost in semifinals against Djurgården (3–4)
2019–20	Tier 1	SHL	2nd	25–6–5–16	7,546	Top scorer: (Sweden) M. Nilsson (54 pts); Top goalie: (Sweden) A. Holm (91.50 SV%)
2019–20	Swedish Championship playoffs		Cancelled due to the COVID-19 pandemic in Sweden			
2020–21	Tier 1	SHL	8th	18–11–5–18	21	Top scorer: (Sweden) D. Viksten (48 pts); Top goalie: (Sweden) A. Holm (91.40 SV%)
2020–21	Swedish Championship playoffs		—	1–1–2–2	0	Won eighthfinals against Malmö (2–0); Lost in quarterfinals against Växjö (0–4)
2021–22	Tier 1	SHL	6th	22–6–4–20	6,020	Top scorer: (Sweden) J. Nygård (41 pts); Top goalie: (Sweden) D. Hildeby (93.08 SV%)
2021–22	Swedish Championship playoffs		—	10–2–1–6	8,142	Won in quarterfinals against Skellefteå (4–2); Won in semifinals against Rögle (4–2); Won in finals against Luleå (4–3); (gold) 2022 Swedish Champions (10th title)
2022–23	Tier 1	SHL	3rd	24–7–4–17	7,296	Top scorer: (Sweden) J. Nygård (38 pts); Top goalie: (Sweden) D. Hildeby (91.80 SV%)
2022–23	Swedish Championship playoffs		—	3–0–0–4	8,250	Lost in quarterfinals against Frölunda (3–4)
2023–24	Tier 1	SHL	1st	30–3–8–11	7,404	Top scorer: (Czech Republic) D. Tomášek (45 pts); Top goalie: (Canada) M. Lagacé (91.90 SV%)
2023–24	Swedish Championship playoffs		—	0–0–2–2	7,946	Lost in quarterfinals against Rögle (0–4)
2024–25	Tier 1	SHL	4th	23–6–7–16	7,588	Top scorer: (Czech Republic) D. Tomášek (57 pts); Top goalie: (Canada) M. Lagacé (88.70 SV%)
2024–25	Swedish Championship playoffs		—	2–0–1–3	8,220	Lost in quarterfinals against Skellefteå (2–4)
