= 2013–14 Färjestad BK season =

Swedish ice hockey club season

2013–14 Färjestad BK
- League: 5th SHL
- 2013–14 record: 21-19-7-8
- Goals for: 143
- Goals against: 134
- Arena: Löfbergs Arena

Team leaders
- Goals: Joakim Hillding
- Assists: Joakim Hillding
- Points: Joakim Hillding
- Penalty minutes: Ole-Kristian Tollefsen
- Wins: Fredrik Petterson-Wentzel
- Goals against average: Fredrik Petterson-Wentzel

The 2013–14 Färjestad BK season was Färjestad BK's 39th season in the Swedish Hockey League (formerly known as Elitserien), the top division in Sweden. They finished fifth in the regular season and lost to Skellefteå AIK in the playoff finals, four games to none.

== Regular season ==
=== Standings ===
Updated as of March 8, 2014.

2013–14 SHL season	GP	W	L	OTW	OTL	GF	GA	GD	Pts
Skellefteå AIK^{y}	55	32	12	4	7	179	121	+58	111
Frölunda HC^{x}	55	29	15	4	7	153	123	+30	102
Växjö Lakers^{x}	55	23	14	7	11	156	130	+26	94
Brynäs IF^{x}	55	19	19	11	6	163	152	+11	85
Färjestad BK^{x}	55	21	19	7	8	143	134	+9	85
Luleå HF^{x}	55	22	21	6	6	136	115	+21	84
Leksands IF^{p}	55	23	23	5	4	118	155	–37	83
Modo Hockey^{p}	55	18	20	10	7	131	132	–1	81
Linköpings HC^{p}	55	20	24	7	4	174	167	+7	78
HV71^{p}	55	17	27	9	2	146	182	–36	71
Örebro HK^{r}	55	13	25	5	12	119	160	–41	61
AIK^{r}	55	12	30	6	7	124	171	–47	55

x – clinched playoff spot; y – clinched regular season league title; p – qualified for Play In; r – play in relegation series

== Playoffs ==
=== Quarterfinals ===
==== (4) Brynäs IF vs. (5) Färjestad BK ====
March 16	Brynäs IF	1–2	Färjestad BK	Läkerol Arena	Recap
Anton Rödin 1 – 11:45		First period	No scoring
No scoring		Second period	8:35 – Patrik Lundh 1
No scoring		Third period	17:25 – Joakim Hillding 1
Bernhard Starkbaum 33 saves / 35 shots		Goalie stats	Fredrik Pettersson-Wentzel 34 saves / 35 shots

March 18	Färjestad BK	4–2	Brynäs IF	Löfbergs Arena	Recap
Magnus Nygren 1 – pp – 2:05; Linus Fröberg 1 – 11:41; Milan Gulaš 1 – 16:33		First period	No scoring
No scoring		Second period	4:41 – pp – Anton Rödin 2
Martin Røymark 1 – en – 19:36		Third period	15:31 – Johan Harju 1
Fredrik Pettersson-Wentzel 25 saves / 27 shots		Goalie stats	Bernhard Starkbaum 28 saves / 31 shots

March 20	Brynäs IF	1–2	Färjestad BK	Läkerol Arena	Recap
No scoring		First period	19:56 – Joakim Hillding 2
Daniel Brodin 1 – 13:28		Second period	No scoring
No scoring		Third period	11:44 – Linus Fröberg 2
Bernhard Starkbaum 33 saves / 35 shots		Goalie stats	Fredrik Pettersson-Wentzel 35 saves / 36 shots

March 22	Färjestad BK	0–2	Brynäs IF	Löfbergs Arena	Recap
No scoring		First period	11:40 – Bill Sweatt 1
No scoring		Second period	13:49 – Jesper Ollas 1
No scoring		Third period	No scoring
Fredrik Pettersson-Wentzel 23 saves / 25 shots		Goalie stats	Bernhard Starkbaum 33 saves / 33 shots

March 24	Brynäs IF	3–4	OT	Färjestad BK	Läkerol Arena	Recap
Johan Harju 2 – pp – 10:55		First period		No scoring
Christian Djoos 1 – 4:57		Second period		4:13 – Joakim Hillding 3; 13:07 – Per Åslund 1
Greg Scott 1 – pp – 15:38		Third period		2:13 – Milan Gulaš 2
No scoring		First overtime period		8:27 – Patrik Lundh 2
Bernhard Starkbaum 34 saves / 38 shots		Goalie stats		Fredrik Pettersson-Wentzel 25 saves / 28 shots

Färjestad BK won series 4–1

=== Semifinals ===
==== (3) Växjö Lakers vs. (5) Färjestad BK ====
April 1	Växjö Lakers	1–2	Färjestad BK	Vida Arena	Recap
No scoring		First period	No scoring
Jan Hlaváč 3 – 16:17		Second period	No scoring
No scoring		Third period	7:09 – Pontus Åberg 1; 11:07 – Per Åslund 2
Teemu Lassila 21 saves / 23 shots		Goalie stats	Fredrik Pettersson-Wentzel 31 saves / 32 shots

April 3	Färjestad BK	1–6	Växjö Lakers	Löfbergs Arena	Recap
Rickard Wallin 1 – 5:06		First period	15:15 – Ryan Lasch 1
No scoring		Second period	7:55 – Alexander Johansson 5; 9:42 – Robert Rosén 1; 17:01 – Robert Rosén 2
No scoring		Third period	8:27 – Robert Rosén 3; 13:48 – pp – Rhett Rakhshani 3
Fredrik Pettersson-Wentzel 23 saves / 29 shots Pekka Tuokkola 0 saves / 0 shots		Goalie stats	Teemu Lassila 23 saves / 24 shots

April 5	Växjö Lakers	1–4	Färjestad BK	Vida Arena	Recap
Robert Rosén 4 – pp – 10:28		First period	11:45 – pp – Magnus Nygren 2
No scoring		Second period	12:53 – Milan Gulaš 3
No scoring		Third period	19:07 – en – Rickard Wallin 2; 19:47 – en – Patrik Lundh 3
Teemu Lassila 24 saves / 26 shots		Goalie stats	Fredrik Pettersson-Wentzel 27 saves / 28 shots

April 7	Färjestad BK	1–2	OT	Växjö Lakers	Löfbergs Arena	Recap
No scoring		First period		No scoring
No scoring		Second period		1:56 – sh – Jan Hlaváč 4
Linus Fröberg 3 – pp – 12:46		Third period		No scoring
No scoring		First overtime period		14:27 – Alexander Johansson 6
Fredrik Pettersson-Wentzel 30 saves / 32 shots		Goalie stats		Teemu Lassila 26 saves / 27 shots

April 9	Växjö Lakers	2–3	Färjestad BK	Vida Arena	Recap
No scoring		First period	0:10 – Patrik Lundh 4
Malte Strömwall 1 – 8:56		Second period	No scoring
Robert Rosén 5 – pp – 13:30		Third period	10:58 – Milan Gulaš 4; 11:56 – Jack Connolly 1
Teemu Lassila 17 saves / 20 shots		Goalie stats	Fredrik Pettersson-Wentzel 42 saves / 44 shots

April 11	Färjestad BK	3–2	OT	Växjö Lakers	Löfbergs Arena	Recap
No scoring		First period		No scoring
No scoring		Second period		9:02 – Robert Rosén 6
Rickard Wallin 3 – 1:35; Milan Gulaš 5 – 19:11		Third period		5:47 – Johan Markusson 1
Rickard Wallin 4 – 9:04		First overtime period		No scoring
Fredrik Pettersson-Wentzel 38 saves / 40 shots		Goalie stats		Teemu Lassila 33 saves / 36 shots

Färjestad BK won series 4–2

=== Final ===
==== (1) Skellefteå AIK vs. (5) Färjestad BK ====
April 15	Skellefteå AIK	3–0	Färjestad BK	Skellefteå Kraft Arena	Recap
Jimmie Ericsson 9 – pp – 6:53; Joakim Lindström 5 – 10:54		First period	No scoring
Pierre-Édouard Bellemare 6 – pp – 18:11		Second period	No scoring
No scoring		Third period	No scoring
Markus Svensson 21 saves / 21 shots		Goalie stats	Fredrik Pettersson-Wentzel 22 saves / 25 shots

April 17	Färjestad BK	2–6	Skellefteå AIK	Löfbergs Arena	Recap
No scoring		First period	19:02 – pp – Bud Holloway 3
Christian Berglund 1 – 7:43		Second period	13:39 – Pierre-Édouard Bellemare 7
Anders Bastiansen 1 – sh – 13:31		Third period	3:26 – Jimmie Ericsson 10; 11:07 – John Norman 2; 11:32 – Oskar Sundqvist 3; 19:41 – en – Oscar Möller 5
Fredrik Pettersson-Wentzel 26 saves / 31 shots Pekka Tuokkola 6 saves / 6 shots		Goalie stats	Markus Svensson 27 saves / 29 shots

April 19	Skellefteå AIK	8–1	Färjestad BK	Skellefteå Kraft Arena	Recap
Viktor Arvidsson 4 – 14:43; Jimmie Ericsson 11 – pp – 17:01; Oskar Sundqvist 4 – sh – 19:21		First period	10:31 – Pontus Åberg 2
Joakim Lindström 6 – 11:50; Melker Karlsson 3 – 14:10		Second period	No scoring
Melker Karlsson 4 – 0:59; Pierre-Édouard Bellemare 8 – 2:08; Jimmie Ericsson 12 – 3:24		Third period	No scoring
Markus Svensson 20 saves / 21 shots		Goalie stats	Fredrik Pettersson-Wentzel 13 saves / 16 shots Pekka Tuokkola 18 saves / 23 shots

April 21	Färjestad BK	0–3	Skellefteå AIK	Löfbergs Arena	Recap
No scoring		First period	No scoring
No scoring		Second period	No scoring
No scoring		Third period	2:46 – Anton Lindholm 1; 17:06 – pp – Pierre-Édouard Bellemare 9; 18:18 – en – Martin Lundberg 1
Fredrik Pettersson-Wentzel 24 saves / 26 shots		Goalie stats	Markus Svensson 23 saves / 23 shots

Skellefteå AIK won series 4–0
