= 2012–13 Färjestad BK season =

Swedish ice hockey club season

2012–13 Färjestad BK
- League: 2nd Elitserien
- 2012–13 record: 27-14-7-7
- Goals for: 155
- Goals against: 110
- Arena: Löfbergs Lila Arena

Team leaders
- Goals: Per Aslund; Marcus Paulsson
- Assists: Chris Lee
- Points: Chris Lee
- Penalty minutes: Christian Berglund
- Wins: Alexander Salak
- Goals against average: Alexander Salak

The 2012–13 Färjestad BK season was Färjestad BK's 38th season in the Elitserien ice hockey league (SEL), the top division in Sweden. They finished second in the regular season and lost to Luleå HF in the playoff semifinals, four games to one.

== Regular season ==
=== Standings ===
2012–13 Elitserien season	GP	W	L	OTW	OTL	GF	GA	GD	Pts
Skellefteå AIK^{y}	55	34	13	4	4	170	107	63	114
Färjestad BK^{x}	55	27	14	7	7	155	110	45	102
Luleå HF^{x}	55	25	12	9	9	145	102	43	102
HV71^{x}	55	27	16	9	3	155	124	31	102
Linköpings HC^{x}	55	27	19	4	5	145	136	9	94
Frölunda HC^{x}	55	21	21	8	5	123	126	–3	84
Modo Hockey^{x}	55	19	19	7	10	135	129	6	81
Brynäs IF^{x}	55	17	20	6	12	123	166	–43	75
AIK^{e}	55	16	25	7	7	123	149	–26	69
Växjö Lakers HC^{e}	55	14	26	7	8	102	130	–28	64
Timrå IK^{r}	55	12	30	8	5	100	127	–27	57
Rögle BK^{r}	55	10	34	5	6	104	174	–70	46

x – clinched playoff spot; y – clinched regular season league title; e – eliminated from playoff contention; r – play in relegation series

== Playoffs ==
=== Quarterfinals ===
==== (2) Färjestad BK vs. (7) Modo Hockey ====
March 12	Färjestad BK	4–2	Modo Hockey	Löfbergs Lila Arena	Recap
Per Åslund 1 - 4:58		First period	8:31 - Niklas Sundström 1; 10:04 - Marcel Mueller 1
Chris Lee 1 - pp - 7:13		Second period	No scoring
Per Åslund 2 - pp - 2:33; Marius Holtet 1 - 10:06		Third period	No scoring
Alexander Salák 24 saves / 26 shots		Goalie stats	Bernhard Starkbaum 29 saves / 33 shots

March 14	Modo Hockey	3–5	Färjestad BK	Fjällräven Center	Recap
Mattias Ritola 1 - 9:23		First period	12:34 - Joakim Hillding 1
Per-Åge Skrøder 1 - pp - 12:11; Niklas Sundström 2 - 15:08		Second period	9:36 - pp - Chris Lee 2; 16:26 - Patrik Lundh 1
No scoring		Third period	11:48 - Chris Lee 3; 18:50 - en - Anders Bastiansen 1
Bernhard Starkbaum 25 saves / 30 shots		Goalie stats	Alexander Salák 26 saves / 29 shots

March 16	Färjestad BK	2–1	Modo Hockey	Löfbergs Lila Arena	Recap
Rickard Wallin 1 - 5:19		First period	12:02 - pp - Per-Åge Skrøder 2
Chris Lee 4 - 2:19		Second period	No scoring
No scoring		Third period	No scoring
Alexander Salák 32 saves / 33 shots		Goalie stats	Bernhard Starkbaum 27 saves / 29 shots

March 18	Modo Hockey	5–4	OT	Färjestad BK	Fjällräven Center	Recap
No scoring		First period		2:50 - Chris Lee 5; 3:09 - Anders Bastiansen 2
Mattias Ritola 2 - 1:44; Kyle Cumiskey 1 - pp - 7:44		Second period		0:25 - pp - Marius Holtet 2
Marcel Mueller 2 - pp - 9:44; Jonas Ahnelöv 1 - 16:20		Third period		8:41 - Marius Holtet 3
Ladislav Nagy 1 - 5:01		First overtime period		No scoring
Bernhard Starkbaum 0 saves / 2 shots Linus Ullmark 25 saves / 27 shots		Goalie stats		Alexander Salák 34 saves / 39 shots

March 20	Färjestad BK	1–0	OT	Modo Hockey	Löfbergs Lila Arena	Recap
No scoring		First period		No scoring
No scoring		Second period		No scoring
No scoring		Third period		No scoring
Rickard Wallin 2 - 0:57		First overtime period		No scoring
Alexander Salák 26 saves / 26 shots		Goalie stats		Linus Ullmark 39 saves / 40 shots

Färjestad BK won series 4–1

=== Semifinals ===
==== (2) Färjestad BK vs. (3) Luleå HF ====
Luleå won the series 4–1 and advanced to the Finals for the first time since winning the Swedish Championship in 1996. Linus Persson's game-deciding goal in Game 4, 12 seconds into overtime, is a new record for the fastest overtime goal scored in Elitserien playoff history.

March 29	Färjestad BK	1–4	Luleå HF	Löfbergs Lila Arena	Recap
No scoring		First period	12:10 - pp - Anton Hedman 1
Chris Lee 6 - 7:50		Second period	2:31 - Toni Koivisto 2; 15:15 - pp - Linus Klasen 3
No scoring		Third period	18:58 - en - Chris Abbott 3
Alexander Salák 24 saves / 28 shots		Goalie stats	Johan Gustafsson 26 saves / 27 shots

March 31	Luleå HF	5–2	Färjestad BK	Coop Norrbotten Arena	Recap
Cam Abbott 1 - 13:46		First period	9:55 - Christian Berglund 1
Joonas Vihko 2 - pp - 1:12; Jan Sandström 3 - pp - 1:56; Cam Abbott 2 - 6:39		Second period	2:36 - pp - Mikael Johansson 1
Mika Pyörälä 1 - en - 18:59		Third period	No scoring
Johan Gustafsson 17 saves / 19 shots		Goalie stats	Alexander Salák 22 saves / 27 shots

April 2	Färjestad BK	4–1	Luleå HF	Löfbergs Lila Arena	Recap
Anders Bastiansen 3 - 18:26; Chris Lee 7 - 19:33		First period	No scoring
No scoring		Second period	9:54 - pp - Linus Persson 4
Mikael Johansson 2 - 1:15; Patrik Lundh 2 - 11:38		Third period	No scoring
Alexander Salák 30 saves / 31 shots		Goalie stats	Johan Gustafsson 16 saves / 20 shots

April 4	Luleå HF	3–2	OT	Färjestad BK	Coop Norrbotten Arena	Recap
No scoring		First period		2:07 - Anton Grundel 1
Karl Fabricius 2 - 1:16; Jens Jakobs 1 - 4:49		Second period		9:24 - pp - Christian Berglund 2
No scoring		Third period		No scoring
Linus Persson 5 - 0:12		First overtime period		No scoring
Johan Gustafsson 18 saves / 20 shots		Goalie stats		Alexander Salák 36 saves / 39 shots

April 6	Färjestad BK	1–2	OT	Luleå HF	Löfbergs Lila Arena	Recap
No scoring		First period		No scoring
Magnus Nygren 1 - pp - 8:12		Second period		No scoring
No scoring		Third period		11:16 - pp - Linus Persson 6
No scoring		First overtime period		12:45 - Linus Klasen 4
Alexander Salák 30 saves / 32 shots		Goalie stats		Johan Gustafsson 44 saves / 45 shots

Luleå HF won series 4–1
