= Markus Karlsson =

Markus Karlsson may refer to:

- Markus Karlsson (footballer, born 1972), Swedish football (soccer) player for Djurgården
- Markus Karlsson (footballer, born 1979), Swedish football (soccer) player for Degerfors and AIK
- Markus Karlsson (footballer, born 2004), Swedish football (soccer) player for Hammarby
- Markus Karlsson (ice hockey) (born 1988), Swedish ice hockey defenceman
- Markus Karlsson (presenter), presenter with France 24
