= Alavuden Peli-Veikot =

Multi-sport club in Alavus, Finland

APV
- Alavuden Peli-Veikot
- Formation: April 19, 1953; 73 years ago
- Founder: Armas Korpela
- Type: Sports club
- Members: 1,100 (2013)
- Chair of the Board: Timo Raisio
- Football Chair: Timo Raisio
- Ice Hockey Chair: Michael Ojala
- Pesapällo Chair: Tero Juurakko
- Board of directors: Jari Helander; Ismo Hoskari; Hanna Lassila; Michael Ojala; Päivi Paalanen; Jari Sippola; Kari Visavalta
- Affiliations: Alajärven Ankkurit (Superpesis)
- Website: apv.fi

Alavuden Peli-Veikot ry or APV is a sports club in Alavus, Finland. APV was founded in 1953 as a speciality football club – tradition holds that it was the first specialty football club to be founded in rural Finland – but expanded to include other sports over time. The club now offers programs in football, futsal, ice hockey, and pesäpallo and is best known for its youth and junior teams. APV's representative ice hockey teams play in the men's fourth-tier II-divisioona and in the women's second-tier Naisten Mestis. The club's representative men's pesäpallo team plays in the Suomensarja (Finnish League), the third-tier league below the Superpesis and Ykköspesis.

== History ==
Football spread to Alavus and the surrounding countryside from the urban centers of Vaasa and Tampere. The new sport was first practiced in Alavus at the Jokivarren School in 1908. By the 1940s the game was established in the region, where informal games were played in pastures and hayfields. Alavuden Urheilijat (Alavus Athletes) was the first club in Alavus to organize a football division under its sports department and the first official games in Alavus were played in 1947. Early on, there was interest amongst footballers to create a specialty club but the project was delayed by economic issues. However, plans to establish a club began to materialize when the municipality of Alavus gained ownership of the central sports field.

The founding meeting for Alavuden Peli-Veikot was held at 1 pm on 19 April 1953 in the Kyntäjän Cooperative. Armas Korpela, football chairman of the Alavuden Urheilijat at that time, was integral to the success of the founding meeting. With newspaper announcements and posters, he invited alumnus football players to attend “in large numbers.” The meeting minutes officially recorded 22 people in attendance but contemporary accounts describe a crowd that extended down the stairs to the front door. The Football Association of Finland was represented by Anselm Anttila, in whom APV found a stalwart supporter. Alavuden Urheilijat ry donated all of their kits, balls, and equipment to the newly created club.

Alavuden Peli-Veikot was granted membership to the Football Association of Finland on 18 May 1953 and the club was registered on 14 September 1953.

Early on, APV supported a project to establish a skating rink in Alavus. The project was funded and supported entirely from community donations, the municipality did not provide any grants to the initial construction or maintenance. Donations of note included an initial monetary donation made by Urmas Seppä with his wife and pharmacist Hannes Leinonen, some lumber donated by Mr. Hakkola of Hakkola Sawmill in Tuuri, and the efforts of Nepa Sinkkonen, who transformed an old truck engine into a water pump to spray water through an attached hose and resurface the ice. Unfortunately, operating the ice rink became unsustainable after several years and the project was ended.

== Ice hockey ==
Ice hockey was officially included in APV's program in 1964. Alavus Areena serves as home ice for the men's and women's representative teams. The arena was completed in 2008 and can seat 421 spectators.

The men's representative team plays in the Keskimaan lohko (Central Division) of the II-divisoona. The team won the regional championship in the 2012–13 season and progressed to the Suomi-sarja qualifiers (karsinta), however, they did not earn promotion at that time.

In December 2019, the women's representative team gained promotion to the Alempi jatkosarja (Lower Division) of the Naisten Liiga from the Ristiinkarsinta (Cross-qualifiers) of the Naisten Mestis. The promotion marked the team's first return to the top-tier Naisten Liiga since the 2009–10 season. APV was relegated in the Karsintasarja (Qualification series) in March of the 2019–20 Naisten Liiga season.

APV's junior program is well regarded and has produced such players as Kärpät forward and Olympic medalist Saila Saari, goaltender Pekka Tuokkola, coach Tuomas Tuokkola, and defenceman Lauri Taipalus. Rally driver Jari-Matti Latvala played junior hockey at APV.

=== Notable alumni ===
- Petteri Haveri, alternate-captain of Peliitat Heinola
- Katja Manninen, Naisten Liiga player from 2003 to 2005
- Saila Saari, won bronze with Naisleijonat at the 2018 Winter Olympics
- Lauri Taipalus, awarded Liiga Most Assists by a Defenseman (2014–15)
- Eveliina Tuokkola, Naisten Liiga player from 2003 to 2006
- Pekka Tuokkola, Liiga Champion and Jari Kurri Award winner in the 2008–09 season
- Tuomas Tuokkola, head coach of KooKoo since 2016

== Pesäpallo ==
APV's men's representative pesäpallo team has competed in the Suomensarja (Finnish League) since 2014.
