= Tuokkola =

Tuokkola is a Finnish surname. Notable people with the surname include:

- Mirjam Tuokkola (born 1997), Finnish archer
- Pekka Tuokkola (born 1983), Finnish ice hockey player
- Tuomas Tuokkola (born 1970), Finnish ice hockey player and coach
