= Andro Michel =

Swedish ice hockey goaltender

- Born: June 11, 1990 (age 35) Gothenburg, Sweden
- Height: 6 ft 2 in (188 cm)
- Weight: 185 lb (84 kg; 13 st 3 lb)
- Position: Goaltender
- Catches: Right
- Elitserien team: Färjestads BK
- Playing career: 2010–present

Andro Michel (born June 11, 1990) is a Swedish professional ice hockey goaltender. He played with Färjestads BK in the Elitserien during the 2010–11 Elitserien season.
