= Robin Sterner =

Swedish ice hockey player

- Born: July 1, 1990 (age 35) Helsingborg, Sweden
- Height: 5 ft 10 in (178 cm)
- Weight: 181 lb (82 kg; 12 st 13 lb)
- Position: Centre
- Shoots: Left
- Metal Ligaen team Former teams: Odense Bulldogs; Färjestads BK; BIK Karlskoga; Örebro HK; Timrå IK; Rögle BK; Lørenskog IK
- NHL draft: Undrafted
- Playing career: 2009–present

Robin Sterner (born July 1, 1990) is a Swedish professional ice hockey centre who currently plays for Odense Bulldogs of the Danish Metal Ligaen.

== Career statistics ==
			Regular season					Playoffs
Season	Team	League	GP	G	A	Pts	PIM	GP	G	A	Pts	PIM
2004–05	Färjestad BK U16	U16 SM	3	0	1	1	0	—	—	—	—	—
2005–06	Färjestad BK U16	U16 SM	5	0	5	5	2	—	—	—	—	—
2005–06	Färjestad BK J18	J18 Allsvenskan	5	0	0	0	0	4	0	0	0	0
2006–07	Färjestad BK J18	J18 Allsvenskan	14	8	11	19	51	7	1	5	6	22
2007–08	Färjestad BK J18	J18 Allsvenskan	14	11	12	23	22	8	2	5	7	26
2007–08	Skåre BK	Division 1	14	6	7	13	24	—	—	—	—	—
2008–09	Skåre BK J20	J20 Elit	4	6	5	11	0	—	—	—	—	—
2008–09	Skåre BK	Division 1	31	4	5	9	24	—	—	—	—	—
2009–10	Färjestad BK	Elitserien	44	6	3	9	12	4	0	0	0	0
2009–10	Skåre BK	Division 1	25	11	11	22	24	—	—	—	—	—
2010–11	Färjestad BK	Elitserien	53	4	3	7	18	14	1	1	2	4
2010–11	Skåre BK	Division 1	3	1	1	2	2	—	—	—	—	—
2010–11	Bofors IK	HockeyAllsvenskan	3	0	0	0	4	—	—	—	—	—
2011–12	Färjestad BK	Elitserien	40	2	2	4	33	5	0	0	0	0
2011–12	Örebro HK	HockeyAllsvenskan	9	1	2	3	6	5	0	0	0	2
2012–13	Timrå IK	Elitserien	50	3	2	5	26	—	—	—	—	—
2013–14	Rögle BK	HockeyAllsvenskan	52	9	3	12	64	16	3	0	3	8
2014–15	Rögle BK	HockeyAllsvenskan	27	1	4	5	18	—	—	—	—	—
2014–15	Lørenskog IK	Norway	13	5	6	11	14	5	2	0	2	6
2015–16	Lørenskog IK	Norway	40	15	17	32	48	17	4	4	8	10
2016–17	Odense Bulldogs	Denmark	43	7	13	20	56	11	3	3	6	18
2017–18	Kristianstads IK	Hockeyettan	5	1	3	4	2	—	—	—	—	—
2017–18	IK Pantern	HockeyAllsvenskan	40	5	12	17	28	5	0	3	3	2
2018–19	Kristianstads IK	Hockeyettan	33	8	21	29	34	15	2	5	7	8
2019–20	Forshaga IF	Hockeyettan	27	7	3	10	36	—	—	—	—	—
Elitserien totals			187	15	10	25	89	23	1	1	2	4
Norway totals			53	20	23	43	62	22	6	4	10	16
Denmark totals			43	7	13	20	56	11	3	3	6	18
HockeyAllsvenskan totals			131	16	21	37	120	26	3	3	6	12
Hockeyettan (Division 1) totals			138	38	51	89	146	15	2	5	7	8
