= Peter Wennerström =

Swedish ice hockey player

- Born: September 7, 1988 (age 37) Munkfors, Sweden
- Height: 6 ft 3 in (191 cm)
- Weight: 198 lb (90 kg; 14 st 2 lb)
- Position: Right wing
- Shoots: Right
- GET team Former teams: Stjernen; Färjestads BK; Asplöven HC; Örebro HK; Bofors IK; Skåre BK
- NHL draft: Undrafted
- Playing career: 2009–present

Peter Wennerstrom (born September 7, 1988) is a Swedish professional ice hockey player who currently plays for Stjernen of the Norwegian GET-ligaen. He previously played for Färjestads BK.
