= Milan Gulaš =

Czech ice hockey player

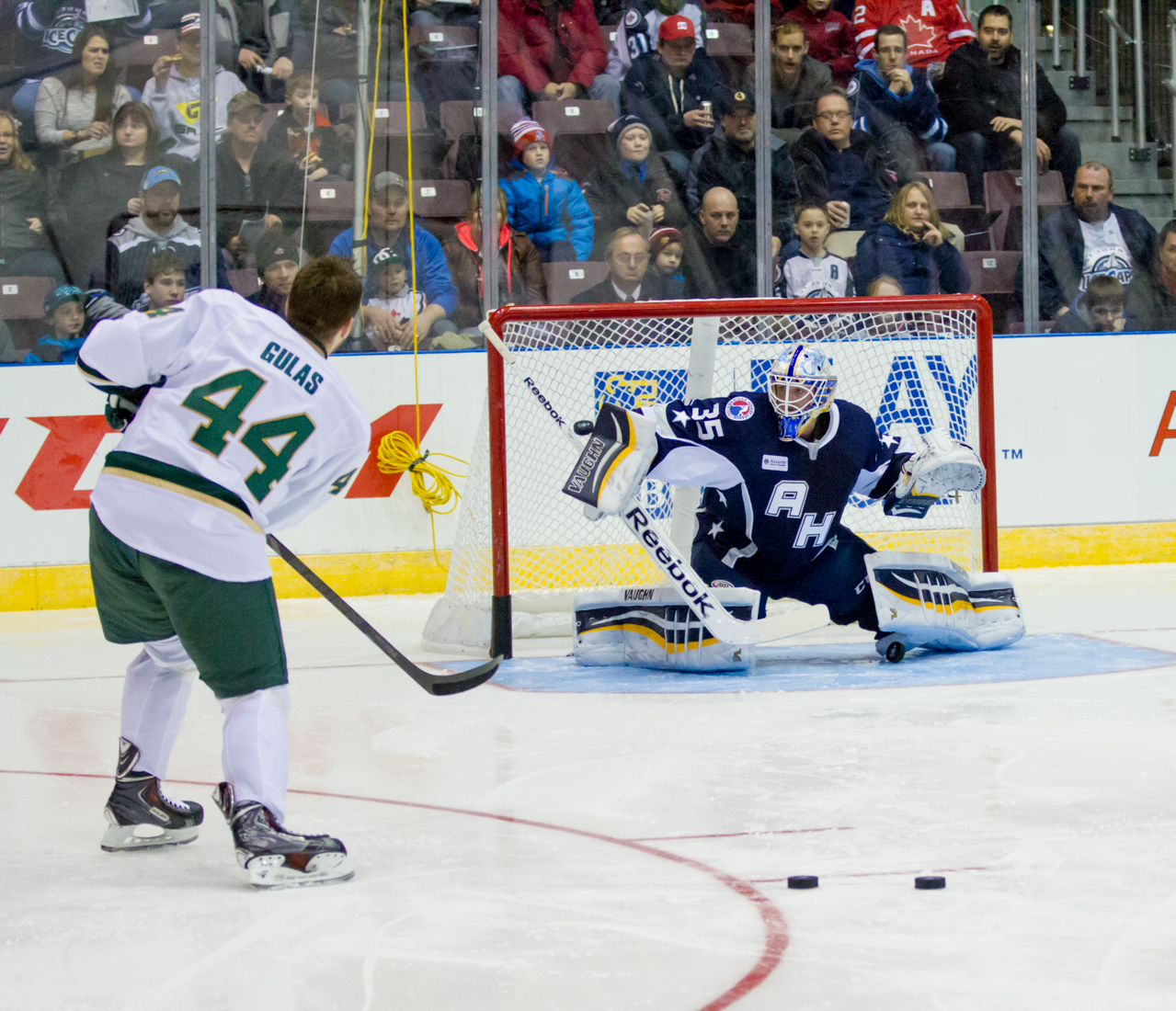
- Born: December 30, 1985 (age 40) České Budějovice, Czechoslovakia
- Height: 5 ft 10 in (178 cm)
- Weight: 194 lb (88 kg; 13 st 12 lb)
- Position: Forward
- Shot: Right
- Played for: Motor České Budějovice; HC Kladno; HC Plzeň; Metallurg Magnitogorsk; Färjestad BK
- National team: Czech Republic
- NHL draft: Undrafted
- Playing career: 2004–2025

Milan Gulaš (born December 30, 1985) is a Czech former professional ice hockey forward who most notably played as Captain of Motor České Budějovice in the Czech Extraliga (ELH). He originally played with České Budějovice in the Czech Extraliga during the 2010–11 Czech Extraliga season.

Gulaš played previously for SK Horácká Slavia Třebíč and HC Kladno.

== Career statistics ==
=== Regular season and playoffs ===
			Regular season					Playoffs
Season	Team	League	GP	G	A	Pts	PIM	GP	G	A	Pts	PIM
2000–01	HC Ceske Budejovice U18	Czech U18	30	2	1	3	2	—	—	—	—	—
2001–02	HC Ceske Budejovice U18	Czech U18	39	11	12	23	24	—	—	—	—	—
2001–02	HC Jindrichuv Hradec U20	Czech U20	—	—	—	—	—	4	2	1	3	0
2002–03	HC Ceske Budejovice U20	Czech U20	30	5	1	6	10	—	—	—	—	—
2003–04	HC Ceske Budejovice U20	Czech U20	55	16	36	52	32	—	—	—	—	—
2003–04	HC Ceske Budejovice	ELH	1	0	0	0	0	—	—	—	—	—
2004–05	Indiana Ice	USHL	30	12	10	22	18	3	0	0	0	4
2004–05	HC Ceske Budejovice U20	Czech U20	29	13	14	27	63	—	—	—	—	—
2005–06	HC Ceske Budejovice U20	Czech U20	31	15	17	32	49	6	2	2	4	33
2005–06	HC Ceske Budejovice	ELH	3	0	1	1	0	6	1	0	1	2
2005–06	HC Strakonice	Czech.2	2	0	0	0	12	—	—	—	—	—
2006–07	HC Ceske Budejovice	ELH	49	1	4	5	20	9	1	0	1	2
2006–07	SK Horacka Slavia Trebic	Czech.1	13	3	3	6	16	—	—	—	—	—
2007–08	HC Ceske Budejovice	ELH	19	2	0	2	12	12	1	1	2	12
2007–08	HC Kladno	ELH	21	2	6	8	18	—	—	—	—	—
2007–08	BK Mlada Boleslav	Czech.1	6	1	0	1	6	—	—	—	—	—
2008–09	HC Ceske Budejovice	ELH	48	14	6	20	24	—	—	—	—	—
2009–10	HC Ceske Budejovice	ELH	52	14	16	30	44	5	2	3	5	2
2010–11	HC Ceske Budejovice	ELH	51	23	21	44	62	5	0	3	3	6
2011–12	HC Ceske Budejovice	ELH	50	17	25	42	50	5	0	1	1	27
2012–13	HC Plzen	ELH	44	27	28	55	28	—	—	—	—	—
2012–13	Metallurg Magnitogorsk	KHL	4	0	0	0	0	7	4	1	5	8
2013–14	Metallurg Magnitogorsk	KHL	22	2	3	5	18	—	—	—	—	—
2013–14	Färjestad BK	SHL	26	10	13	23	34	15	5	2	7	14
2014–15	Färjestad BK	SHL	53	20	20	40	26	3	0	4	4	0
2015–16	Färjestad BK	SHL	51	20	25	45	20	5	1	3	4	14
2016–17	Färjestad BK	SHL	47	8	22	30	30	7	3	1	4	6
2017–18	HC Plzen	ELH	48	23	38	61	50	10	7	2	9	10
2018–19	HC Plzen	ELH	51	30	32	62	46	14	6	8	14	6
2019–20	HC Plzen	ELH	52	35	41	76	38	—	—	—	—	—
2020–21	HC Plzen	ELH	47	21	35	56	46	3	0	0	0	6
2021–22	HC Ceske Budejovice	ELH	45	18	24	42	30	9	5	1	6	35
2022–23	HC Ceske Budejovice	ELH	47	24	18	42	24	—	—	—	—	—
2023–24	HC Ceske Budejovice	ELH	47	16	24	40	16	10	7	2	9	2
2024–25	HC Ceske Budejovice	ELH	47	14	27	41	6	8	3	5	8	8
ELH totals			722	281	346	627	514	107	36	28	64	122
SHL totals			177	58	80	138	110	30	9	10	19	34

=== International ===
Year	Team	Event	Result	GP	G	A	Pts	PIM
2019	Czech Republic	WC	4th	6	1	2	3	0
Senior totals				6	1	2	3	0
