= Chris Lee (ice hockey) =

Canadian ice hockey player

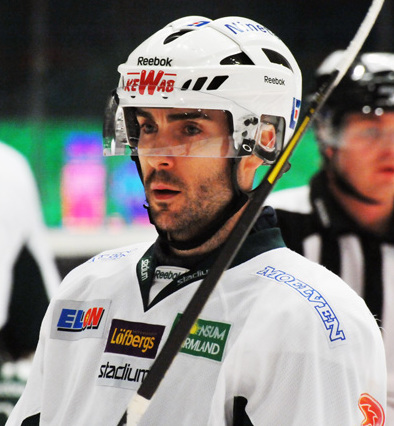
- Lee with Färjestads BK in 2013
- Born: October 3, 1980 (age 45) MacTier, Ontario, Canada
- Height: 5 ft 11 in (180 cm)
- Weight: 18 lb (8 kg; 1 st 4 lb)
- Position: Defence
- Shot: Left
- Played for: Kölner Haie; Adler Mannheim; Färjestad BK; Metallurg Magnitogorsk
- National team: Canada
- NHL draft: Undrafted
- Playing career: 2004–2018

Chris Lee (born October 3, 1980) is a Canadian former professional ice hockey defenceman who last played with Metallurg Magnitogorsk in the Kontinental Hockey League (KHL), where he won the Gagarin Cup in 2014 and 2016.

Lee represented his country at the 2017 IIHF World Championship, and the 2018 Winter Olympics; winning a silver and bronze medal respectively.

== Playing career ==
Undrafted, Lee played 249 regular-season games in the American Hockey League for the Albany River Rats, Omaha Ak-Sar-Ben Knights, Iowa Stars, Bridgeport Sound Tigers., and Wilkes-Barre/Scranton Penguins.

He played the 2011–12 season with Adler Mannheim in the Deutsche Eishockey Liga (DEL). For the 2011–12 DEL season, Lee won the Defenceman of the Year award. He played in the Elitserien with Färjestad BK for the 2012–13 season.

After a successful first season in 2013–14 helping Russian club Metallurg Magnitogorsk claim the Gagarin Cup, Lee was signed to a three-year contract extension on October 16, 2014. He helped the team recapture the championship in 2018, whilst also leading all defenceman in playoff scoring with 13 points (tied with Nikita Zaitsev and Sami Lepistö).

== International play ==
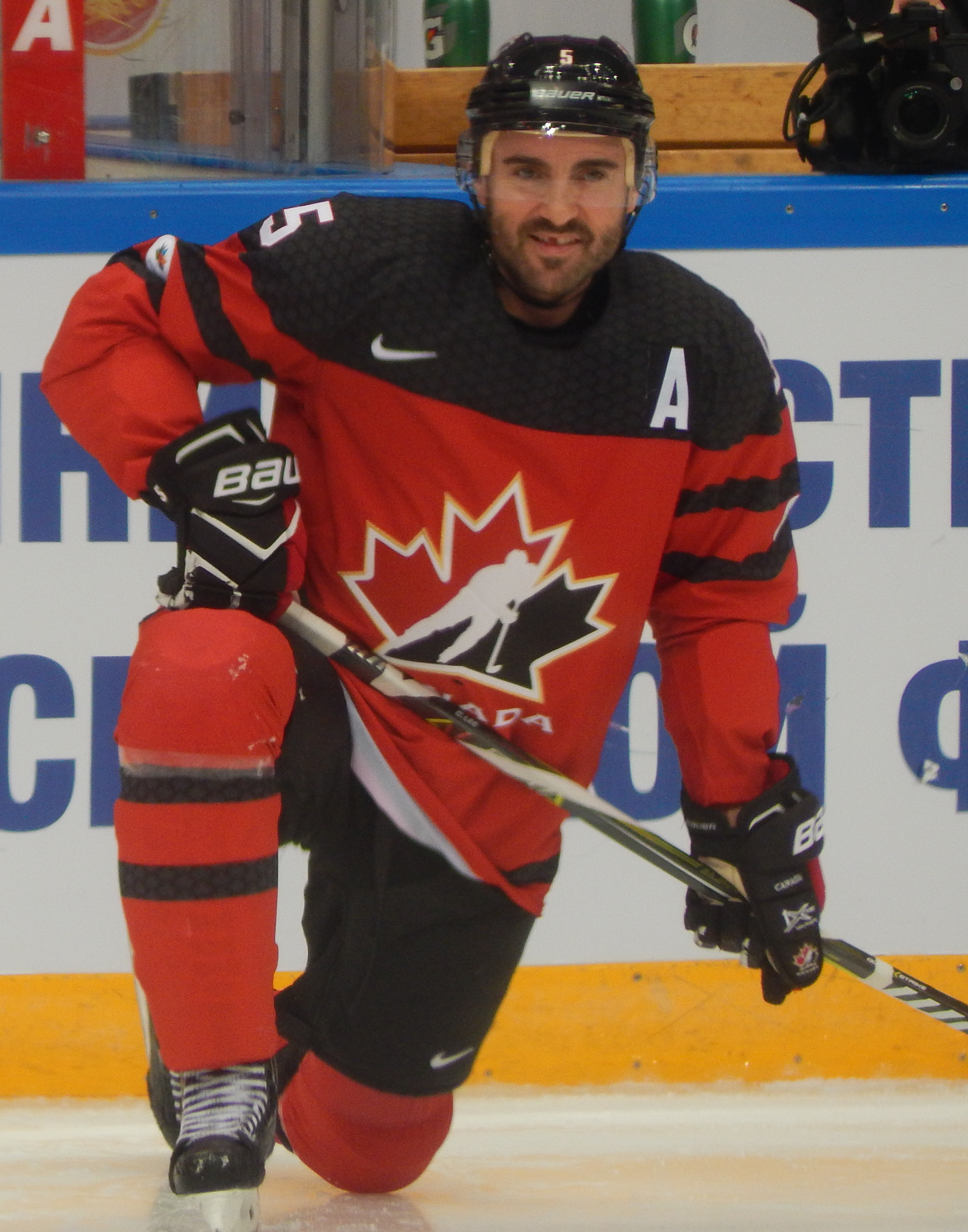
- Lee playing for Team Canada at the 2017 Channel One Cup

Medal record

Representing Canada

Ice hockey

Olympic Games
Bronze medal – third place	2018 Pyeongchang	

World Championships
Silver medal – second place	2017 Germany/France	

Lee originally represented a European-based Team Canada at the Deutschland Cup in 2013 and 2017. During the 2017 IIHF World Championship, Lee was added to the Canada roster after a freak injury suffered by fellow defenceman Tyson Barrie at the team hotel. He made his full international debut with Canada, contributing an assist in a 3–2 victory over host team France on May 11, 2017; Canada went on to win the silver medal losing to Sweden in the gold medal game.

Lee played for Canada at the 2018 Winter Olympics. where they won a bronze medal.

== Career statistics ==
=== Regular season and playoffs ===
			Regular season					Playoffs
Season	Team	League	GP	G	A	Pts	PIM	GP	G	A	Pts	PIM
1996–97	Orillia Terriers	OPJHL	50	2	11	13	64	—	—	—	—	—
1997–98	Parry Sound Shamrocks	NOJHL	26	2	9	11	27	—	—	—	—	—
1998–99	Couchiching Terriers	OPJHL	51	1	15	16	143	—	—	—	—	—
1999–2000	Couchiching Terriers	OPJHL	1	0	0	0	0	—	—	—	—	—
1999–2000	Parry Sound Shamrocks	OPJHL	48	27	28	55	46	—	—	—	—	—
2000–01	Potsdam State	SUNYAC	28	2	6	8	26	—	—	—	—	—
2001–02	Potsdam State	SUNYAC	27	8	14	22	42	—	—	—	—	—
2002–03	Potsdam State	SUNYAC	28	14	22	36	37	—	—	—	—	—
2003–04	Potsdam State	SUNYAC	27	17	32	49	30	—	—	—	—	—
2004–05	Florida Everblades	ECHL	68	5	22	27	16	15	2	9	11	6
2005–06	Florida Everblades	ECHL	52	10	27	37	56	8	2	1	3	4
2006–07	Florida Everblades	ECHL	37	6	19	25	22	9	3	1	4	0
2006–07	Albany River Rats	AHL	3	0	1	1	4	—	—	—	—	—
2006–07	Bridgeport Sound Tigers	AHL	1	0	0	0	0	—	—	—	—	—
2006–07	Omaha Ak-Sar-Ben Knights	AHL	32	4	13	17	16	6	3	0	3	6
2007–08	Iowa Stars	AHL	68	7	21	28	42	—	—	—	—	—
2008–09	Bridgeport Sound Tigers	AHL	66	6	24	30	36	5	0	3	3	2
2009–10	Wilkes-Barre/Scranton Penguins	AHL	79	9	30	39	30	4	0	1	1	0
2010–11	Kölner Haie	DEL	43	6	15	21	34	5	2	0	2	16
2011–12	Adler Mannheim	DEL	52	13	32	45	18	10	1	3	4	4
2012–13	Färjestad BK	SEL	54	12	29	41	30	10	7	5	12	6
2013–14	Metallurg Magnitogorsk	KHL	47	12	19	31	48	21	3	6	9	10
2014–15	Metallurg Magnitogorsk	KHL	60	9	37	46	55	10	0	4	4	8
2015–16	Metallurg Magnitogorsk	KHL	60	9	28	37	38	22	3	10	13	8
2016–17	Metallurg Magnitogorsk	KHL	60	14	51	65	46	18	1	20	21	22
2017–18	Metallurg Magnitogorsk	KHL	26	1	9	10	28	11	2	7	9	4
AHL totals			249	26	89	115	128	15	3	4	7	8
KHL totals			253	45	144	189	215	82	9	47	56	52

=== International ===
Year	Team	Event	Result	GP	G	A	Pts	PIM
2017	Canada	WC	2nd place, silver medalist(s)	7	0	2	2	4
2018	Canada	OG	3rd place, bronze medalist(s)	6	0	5	5	0
Senior totals				13	0	7	7	4

== Awards and honours ==
Award	Year
DEL
Defenseman of the Year	2012
KHL
All-Star Game	2014, 2015, 2017
Gagarin Cup	2014, 2016
First All-Star Team	2016
