= Pelle Prestberg =

Swedish ice hockey player (born 1975)

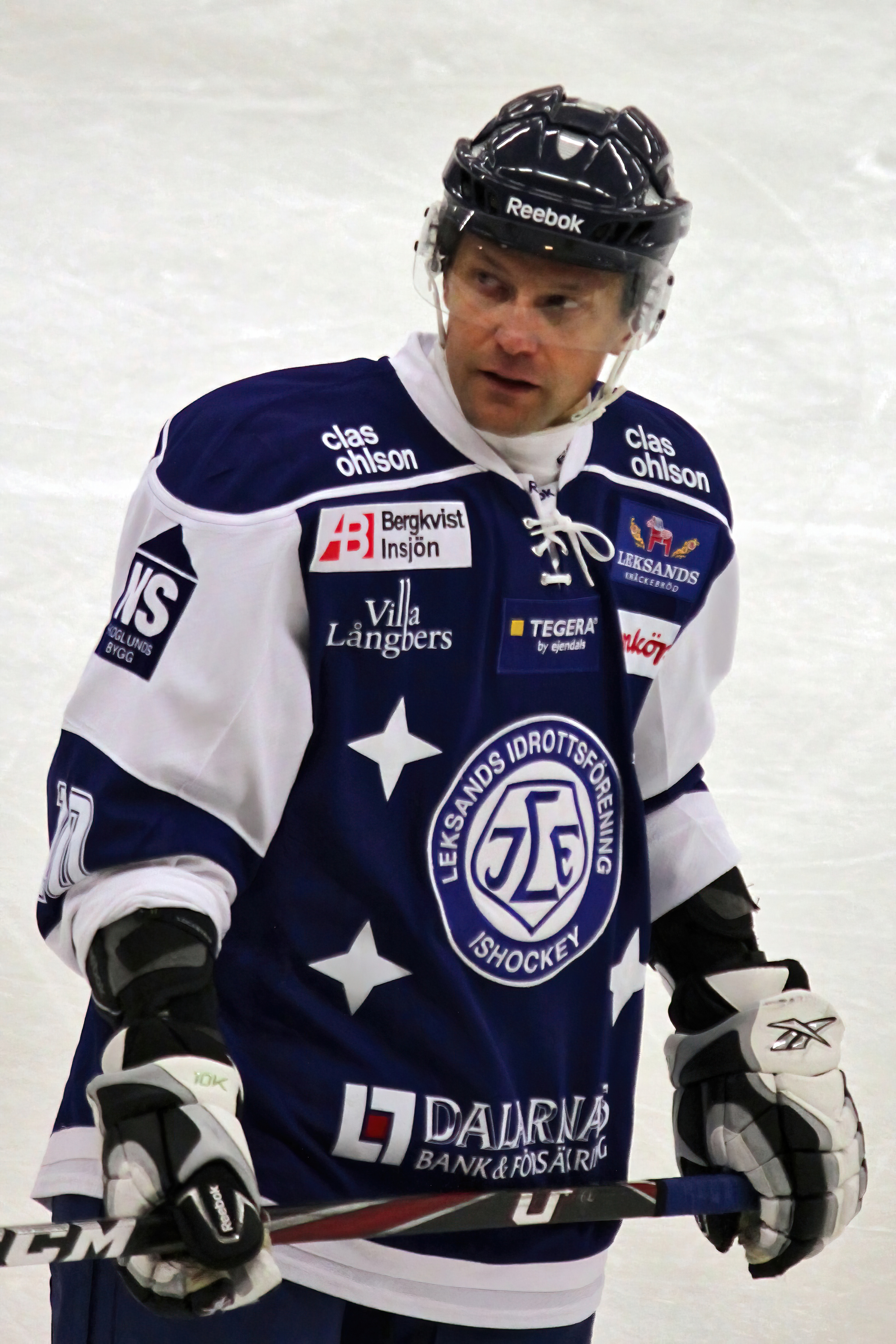
- Pelle Prestberg during a friendly game in August 2011 between Leksands IF and Bofors IK in Bolidenhallen in Hedemora
- Born: February 5, 1975 (age 51) Munkfors, SWE
- Height: 5 ft 10 in (178 cm)
- Weight: 171 lb (78 kg; 12 st 3 lb)
- Position: Right wing
- Shot: Right
- Played for: Färjestads BK; Västra Frölunda HC; Leksands IF
- National team: Sweden
- NHL draft: 233rd overall, 1998; Mighty Ducks of Anaheim
- Playing career: 1997–2014

Pelle Per-Erik Lennart Prestberg (born February 5, 1975, in Munkfors, Sweden) is a Swedish former professional ice hockey player.

== Career ==
Prestberg played for several minor leagues clubs in Sweden before he was signed by Färjestads BK in 1997. He was very successful in his first year with Färjestad; in 45 games he scored 29 goals and 15 assists, which still is the record for a rookie in the Swedish Elite League (Elitserien) for points and goals. In the playoffs the success continued and Prestberg scored 9 goals and 2 assists in 11 games to help Färjestad win the Swedish Championship. In the end of the season, Prestberg also made his debut in the Swedish national team. He was also drafted after the season, by the Mighty Ducks of Anaheim in the 9th round of the 1998 NHL entry draft as the 233rd pick overall. In his second season with Färjestad he did not score as much points as in his debut-season, but 33 points in 48 games was still a good season for Prestberg.

In his third season he only got 22 points and after that season he signed with Färjestad's rival Västra Frölunda HC. He stayed with Frölunda for two years, but he did not have the same success as he had in Färjestad, and in the summer of 2002 he therefore moved back to Färjestad. But his comeback season was not good; he scored only 12 goals and a total of 18 points in 45 games. But the next season he showed both the club and the fans that he still was a good goal-scorer. He scored 22 goals and a total of 45 points, winning Färjestad's scoring league that year. But that did not help Färjestad who lost in the final of the playoffs for the second year in a row. Also the next year Färjestad finished second. But in the 2005–06 season, Prestberg and Färjestad won the gold after they defeated his former club Frölunda HC in the finals. Before the 2008–09 season, Färjestad chose not to renew Prestberg's contract.

After being denied an extended contract with Färjestad, he signed with Leksands IF to help them back to Elitserien. He stayed with the team for two years, but in neither of these years Leksand managed to promote back to Elitserien. Prior to the 2010–11 season, Prestberg signed with Färjestad to return to his former team. Prestberg scored 10 goals and 36 points in 48 games, and his team reached the final, where they won gold again. On April 18, 2011, Prestberg signed to return to Leksand. When Leksand took the step up to SHL the decided not to give Prestberg any new contract. On October 24, 2011, Prestberg once again returned to Färjestad BK on a one-month-long contract.

Prestberg played with Jörgen Jönsson (center) and Peter Nordström (left wing) in Färjestad's first line, called Jönssonligan, named after the Swedish film.

On February 11, 2014, Prestberg officially announced his retirement due to a reappearing old hipinjury.

== Career statistics ==
			Regular season					Playoffs
Season	Team	League	GP	G	A	Pts	PIM	GP	G	A	Pts	PIM
1997–98	Färjestads BK	Elitserien	45	29	15	44	27	12	9	2	11	8
1998–99	Färjestads BK	Elitserien	48	18	15	33	28	4	0	1	1	4
1999–00	Färjestads BK	Elitserien	48	13	9	22	26	7	1	1	2	18
2000–01	Västra Frölunda HC	Elitserien	50	14	9	23	18	5	0	0	0	0
2001–02	Västra Frölunda HC	Elitserien	50	14	11	25	28	10	5	0	5	12
2002–03	Färjestads BK	Elitserien	45	12	6	18	26	14	5	1	6	8
2003–04	Färjestads BK	Elitserien	50	22	23	45	50	12	2	1	3	2
2004–05	Färjestads BK	Elitserien	49	21	14	35	48	15	3	2	5	12
2005–06	Färjestads BK	Elitserien	44	10	10	20	26	18	5	8	13	8
2006–07	Färjestads BK	Elitserien	54	19	29	48	38	8	3	3	6	16
2007–08	Färjestads BK	Elitserien	54	26	12	38	34	11	2	2	4	12
2008–09	Leksands IF	Swe-1	39	30	31	61	47	—	—	—	—	—
Elitserien totals			537	198	153	351	344	116	35	21	56	100
