= Bernhard Starkbaum =

Austrian ice hockey player

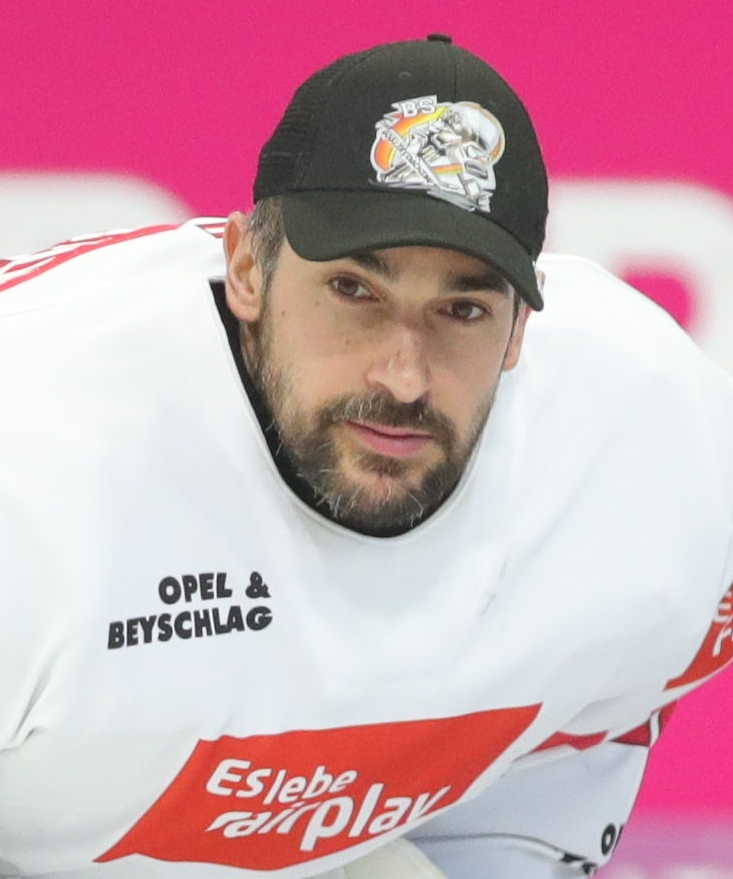
- Starkbaum with Austria in 2023
- Born: February 19, 1986 (age 39); Vienna, Austria
- Height: 6 ft 1 in (185 cm)
- Weight: 196 lb (89 kg; 14 st 0 lb)
- Position: Goaltender
- Catches: Left
- ICEHL team Former teams: Vienna Capitals; Villacher SV; Modo Hockey; Brynäs IF; EC Red Bull Salzburg; EHC Kloten
- National team: Austria
- Playing career: 2006–present

Bernhard Starkbaum (born February 19, 1986) is an Austrian professional ice hockey goaltender who is playing for the Vienna Capitals of the ICE Hockey League (ICEHL).

== Playing career ==
Starkbaum first played as a youth as a product of Wiener EV. From 2006 to 2012, he played for Villacher SV in the Austrian Hockey League and then took his game to Sweden.

After spending four years in Swedish ice hockey, one year with Modo Hockey and three with Brynäs IF, he returned to his native Austria, signing with EC Salzburg in May 2016.

Starkbaum endured a shortened stint with EHC Kloten of the Swiss League before returning to the EBEL, agreeing to terms with the Vienna Capitals midway through the 2017–18 season on 12 January 2018.

== International play ==
Starkbaum was a member of Austria's national teams at the U18 and U20 levels and later became a regular on the country's men's national team. He competed at the 2014 Olympic Games and won gold at the 2010 World Championship Division 1 Group A. He received Best Goaltender honors at the 2016 World Championship Division 1 Group A.
