= Anton Grundel =

Swedish ice hockey player

- Born: March 5, 1990 (age 35); Karlstad, Sweden
- Height: 5 ft 11 in (180 cm)
- Weight: 168 lb (76 kg; 12 st 0 lb)
- Position: Defence
- Shot: Right
- Played for: Färjestad BK; Karlskrona HK
- Playing career: 2007–2019

Anton Grundel (born March 5, 1990) is a Swedish former professional ice hockey defenceman who played most notably for Färjestad BK of the Swedish Hockey League (SHL).

He spent the entirety of his junior and professional career within the Färjestad BK organization, except for the 2015–16 season, playing with newly the promoted Karlskrona HK. During the 2018-19 season, unable to play due to lingering concussion issues, Grundel was forced to retire from professional hockey, announcing on 27 February 2019.

== Career statistics ==
			Regular season					Playoffs
Season	Team	League	GP	G	A	Pts	PIM	GP	G	A	Pts	PIM
2004–05	Färjestad BK U16	U16 SM	3	0	0	0	0	—	—	—	—	—
2005–06	Färjestad BK U16	U16 SM	5	0	5	5	2	—	—	—	—	—
2005–06	Färjestad BK J18	J18 Allsvenskan	—	—	—	—	—	2	0	0	0	0
2006–07	Färjestad BK J18	J18 Elit	6	2	0	2	—	—	—	—	—	—
2006–07	Färjestad BK J18	J18 Allsvenskan	7	2	3	5	6	8	1	2	3	6
2007–08	Färjestad BK J18	J18 Elit	2	0	1	1	2	—	—	—	—	—
2007–08	Färjestad BK J18	J18 Allsvenskan	10	2	8	10	18	8	2	4	6	4
2007–08	Färjestad BK	Elitserien	1	0	1	1	0	1	0	0	0	0
2007–08	Skåre BK	Division 1	15	1	0	1	12	—	—	—	—	—
2008–09	Färjestad BK	Elitserien	9	0	0	0	0	—	—	—	—	—
2008–09	Skåre BK	Division 1	25	1	6	7	51	—	—	—	—	—
2009–10	Färjestad BK	Elitserien	15	0	0	0	0	—	—	—	—	—
2009–10	Skåre BK	Division 1	26	6	12	18	26	—	—	—	—	—
2010–11	Färjestad BK	Elitserien	32	0	1	1	8	2	0	0	0	0
2010–11	Skåre BK	Division 1	1	2	1	3	0	—	—	—	—	—
2011–12	Färjestad BK	Elitserien	43	3	3	6	10	4	1	0	1	0
2012–13	Färjestad BK	Elitserien	46	1	8	9	16	10	1	0	1	6
2013–14	Färjestad BK	SHL	51	1	9	10	14	15	0	1	1	10
2014–15	Färjestad BK	SHL	40	2	3	5	12	3	0	1	1	2
2015–16	Karlskrona HK	SHL	37	1	12	13	14	—	—	—	—	—
2016–17	Färjestad BK	SHL	34	2	3	5	16	7	0	2	2	2
2017–18	Färjestad BK	SHL	10	1	1	2	35	—	—	—	—	—
2018–19	Färjestad BK	SHL	—	—	—	—	—	—	—	—	—	—
SHL (Elitserien) totals			318	11	41	52	125	42	2	4	6	20
Division 1 totals			67	10	19	29	89	—	—	—	—	—

== Awards and honours ==
Award	Year
SHL
Le Mat Trophy (Färjestad BK)	2011
