= Markus Karlsson (ice hockey) =

Swedish ice hockey player

- Born: 3 May 1988 (age 37) Falun, Sweden
- Height: 6 ft 0 in (183 cm)
- Weight: 187 lb (85 kg; 13 st 5 lb)
- Position: Defence
- Shot: Right
- Played for: Färjestads BK
- NHL draft: Undrafted
- Playing career: 2006–2014

Markus Karlsson (born May 3, 1988) in Falun, Sweden, is a retired Swedish professional ice hockey defenceman who played for Färjestads BK of the Elitserien.

== Career statistics ==
			Regular season					Playoffs
Season	Team	League	GP	G	A	Pts	PIM	GP	G	A	Pts	PIM
2004–05	Färjestad BK U18	J18 Allsvenskan	13	0	2	2	4	2	0	0	0	0
2005–06	Färjestad BK U18	J18 Allsvenskan	12	1	1	2	24	7	1	1	2	12
2006–07	Skåre BK	Division 1	33	2	5	7	50	—	—	—	—	—
2007–08	Skåre BK	Division 1	40	7	9	16	54	—	—	—	—	—
2008–09	Bofors IK	HockeyAllsvenskan	42	1	2	3	34	—	—	—	—	—
2008–09	Färjestad BK	Elitserien	2	0	0	0	0	4	0	0	0	6
2009–10	Färjestad BK	Elitserien	28	0	1	1	2	—	—	—	—	—
2009–10	Skåre BK	Division 1	2	0	0	0	2	—	—	—	—	—
2009–10	Leksands IF	HockeyAllsvenskan	15	0	1	1	8	10	0	0	0	4
2010–11	Färjestad BK	Elitserien	10	0	0	0	6	—	—	—	—	—
2010–11	Bofors IK	HockeyAllsvenskan	38	1	1	2	14	—	—	—	—	—
2011–12	Borås HC	HockeyAllsvenskan	32	2	0	2	18	10	0	2	2	4
2012–13	Stjernen Hockey	Norway	31	1	2	3	56	4	0	0	0	10
2013–14	Rungsted Ishockey Klub	Denmark	26	0	3	3	28	—	—	—	—	—
Elitserien totals			40	0	1	1	8	4	0	0	0	6
HockeyAllsvenskan totals			127	4	4	8	74	20	0	2	2	8
Division 1 totals			75	9	14	23	106	—	—	—	—	—
