= Per Åslund =

Swedish ice hockey player (born 1986)

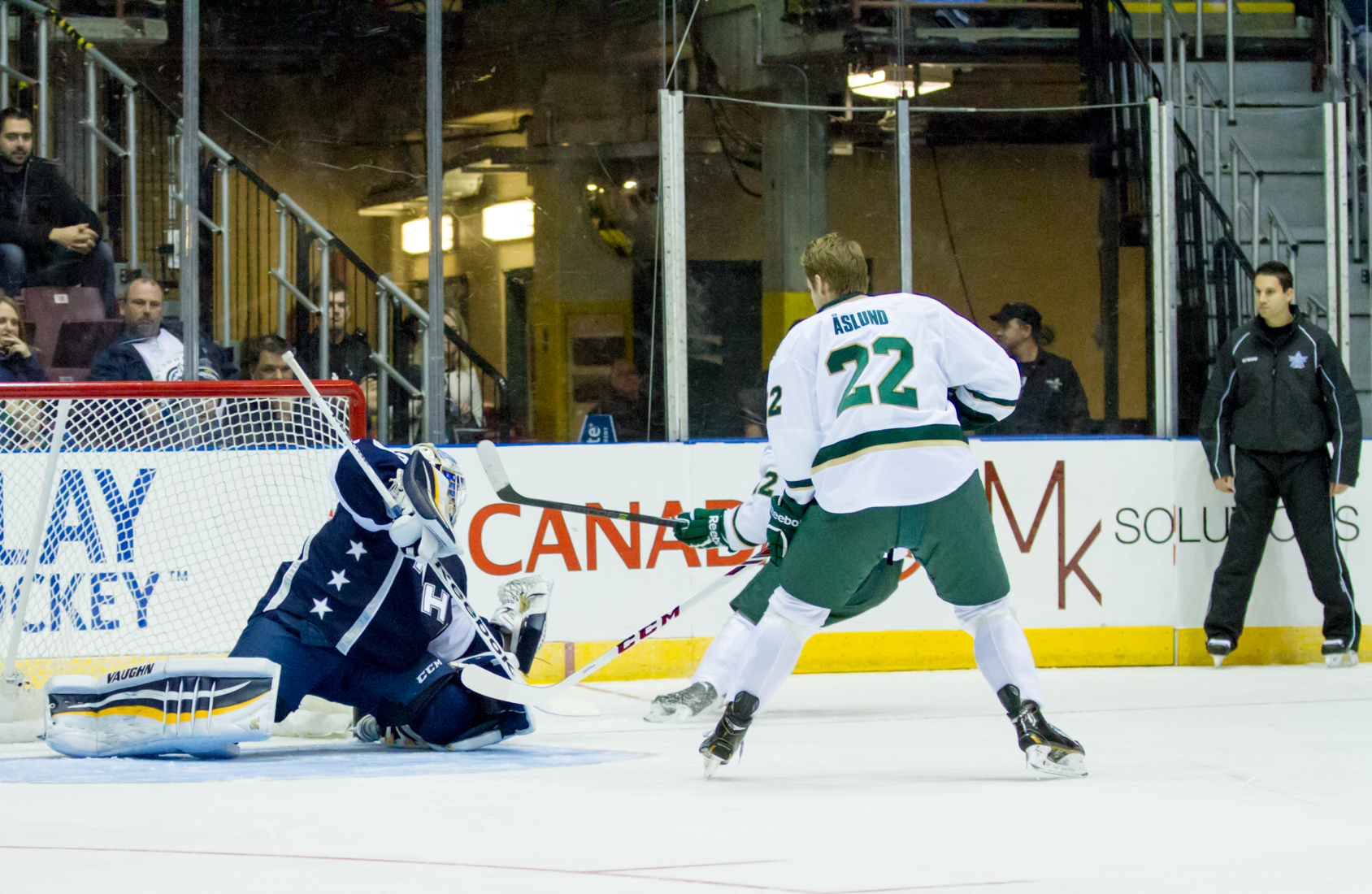
- Born: August 21, 1986 (age 38); Kil, Sweden
- Height: 6 ft 2 in (188 cm)
- Weight: 187 lb (85 kg; 13 st 5 lb)
- Position: Forward
- Shoots: Left
- SHL team Former teams: Färjestad BK; Kölner Haie
- Playing career: 2002–present

Per Åslund (born August 21, 1986) is a Swedish professional ice hockey forward for Färjestad BK of the Swedish Hockey League (SHL).

== Playing career ==
He has spent the majority of his professional career in his native Sweden with Färjestad BK. After 446 SHL games with Färjestad, Åslund left Sweden to sign a one-year contract in Germany, with Kölner Haie of the Deutsche Eishockey Liga (DEL) on March 23, 2015. In the 2015–16 season, Åslund appeared in 47 games with Kölner Haie, contributing with seven goals and 17 points.

On April 19, 2016, Åslund opted to return to Färjestad BK, signing a two-year contract to resume his SHL career.

== Awards and honours ==
Award	Year
SHL
Le Mat Trophy champion	2009, 2011, 2022
