= Alexander Salák =

Czech professional ice hockey goaltender (born 1987)

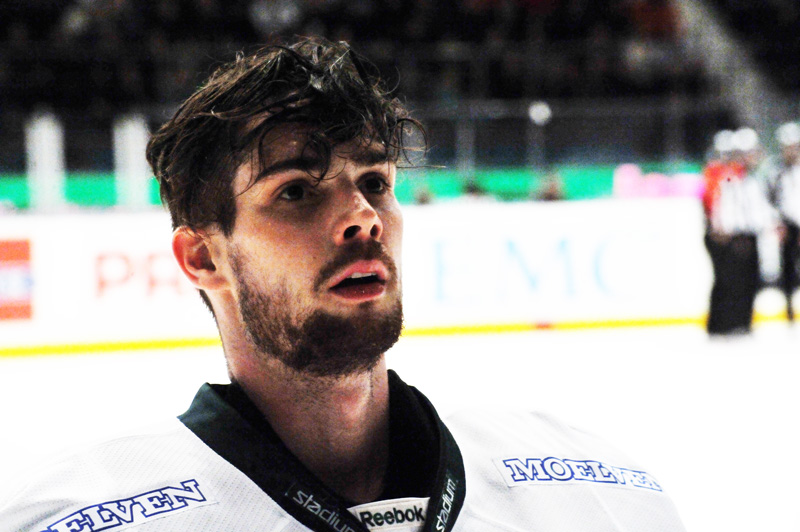
- Born: January 5, 1987 (age 39) Strakonice, Czechoslovakia
- Height: 6 ft 3 in (191 cm)
- Weight: 196 lb (89 kg; 14 st 0 lb)
- Position: Goaltender
- Catches: Left
- team Former teams: Free Agent; TPS Turku; Florida Panthers; Färjestad BK; SKA Saint Petersburg; Sibir Novosibirsk; Lokomotiv Yaroslavl; Dinamo Riga; HC Sparta Praha; Djurgårdens IF
- National team: Czech Republic
- NHL draft: Undrafted
- Playing career: 2004–present

Alexander Salák (born January 5, 1987) is a Czech professional ice hockey goaltender. He is currently an unrestricted free agent who most recently played for Djurgårdens IF of the Swedish Hockey League (SHL). He played two games in the National Hockey League with the Florida Panthers in 2009. Internationally Salák has played for the Czech national team at three World Championships, and at the 2014 Winter Olympics.

== Playing career ==
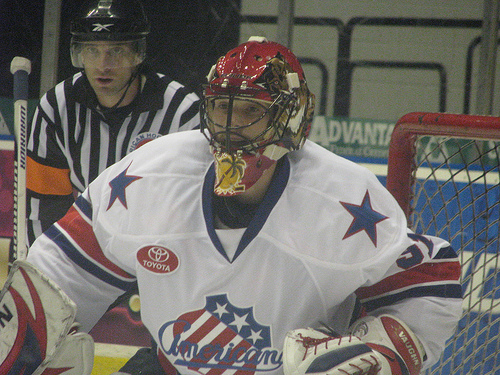
Salák with the Americans in 2010

=== Czech Republic ===
Alexander Salák started his career in IHC Pisek and moved to HC České Budějovice organization during the 2001/02 season.

Salák played from 2002 to 2006 for Budějovice, playing in the U18 and U20 Championship leagues. During the 2005/06 season, he played 2 games for HC Strakonice, a Czech Second National League-team. In the following season, Salák spent the entire season playing for HC Tábor at the same level.

=== Finland ===
Salák with TPS in February 2009.

Alexander Salák was contracted to Finland in 2006, when he played for Mestis team Jokipojat on the second highest level of ice hockey in Finland. For the next season he was contracted to SM-liiga side TPS. In TPS, Salák is coached by TPS Goaltending Coach, Urpo Ylönen who has coached top Finnish goalies like Miikka Kiprusoff, Fredrik Norrena and Antero Niittymäki in the past.

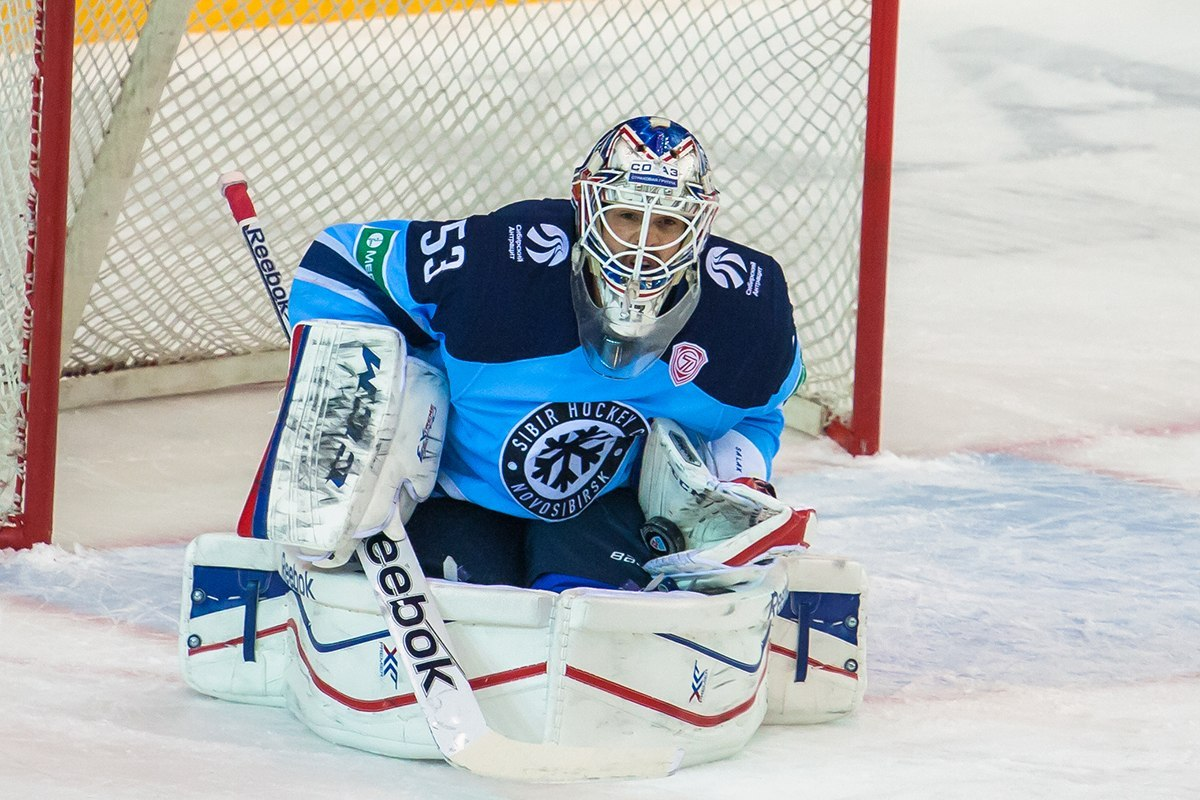
Salák with Sibir Novosibirsk.

=== National Hockey League ===
On May 29, 2009, Alexander Salák was signed by the Florida Panthers of the NHL. He was assigned to their AHL farm team, the Rochester Americans after training camp. He was recalled by the Panthers and made his NHL debut on October 9, 2009, in a relief role in a game against the Carolina Hurricanes. On August 13, 2010, Alexander Salák was loaned to Färjestad BK of the Swedish Elite League for the 2010–11 season.

On February 9, 2011, Salák was traded by the Panthers to the Chicago Blackhawks, along with forward Michael Frolík for Jack Skille, Hugh Jessiman, and David Pacan. On May 31, 2011, Salák was signed by the Blackhawks to a two-year contract. On June 18, 2012, the Blackhawks released Salák from his contract.

=== Kontinental Hockey League ===
He made his Kontinental Hockey League debut playing with SKA Saint Petersburg during the 2013–14 KHL season.

== Career statistics ==
=== Regular season and playoffs ===
			Regular season										Playoffs
Season	Team	League	GP	W	L	T	OTL	MIN	GA	SO	GAA	SV%	GP	W	L	MIN	GA	SO	GAA	SV%
2001–02	ICH Písek U18	CZE-U18	20	—	—	—	—	—	—	—	5.50	.880	—	—	—	—	—	—	—	—
2001–02	HC České Budějovice U18	CZE-U18	8	—	—	—	—	—	—	—	6.32	.810	—	—	—	—	—	—	—	—
2002–03	HC České Budějovice U18	CZE-U18	45	—	—	—	—	—	—	—	2.62	.927	8	—	—	—	—	—	2.33	.932
2003–04	HC České Budějovice U18	CZE-U18	51	—	—	—	—	—	—	—	2.50	.926	2	—	—	—	—	—	2.50	.917
2004–05	HC České Budějovice U20	CZE-U20	41	—	—	—	—	—	—	—	2.34	.922	2	—	—	—	—	—	3.00	.914
2005–06	HC České Budějovice U20	CZE-U20	30	—	—	—	—	—	—	—	1.70	.942	1	—	—	—	—	—	3.00	.813
2005–06	HC Strakonice	CZE-3	2	—	—	—	—	—	—	—	4.00	—	—	—	—	—	—	—	—	—
2005–06	HC Tábor	CZE-3	1	—	—	—	—	—	—	—	1.00	—	—	—	—	—	—	—	—	—
2006–07	Jokipojat	Mestis	35	—	—	—	—	—	—	—	2.81	.918	3	—	—	—	—	—	2.39	.931
2007–08	TPS	SM-l	31	—	—	—	—	1757	76	1	2.59	.915	1	—	—	—	—	—	4.43	.872
2008–09	TPS	SM-l	52	20	20	—	9	2981	119	4	2.40	.923	8	4	4	489	16	0	1.96	.951
2009–10	Florida Panthers	NHL	2	0	1	—	0	67	6	0	5.41	.850	—	—	—	—	—	—	—	—
2009–10	Rochester Americans	AHL	48	29	14	—	0	2557	123	1	2.89	.910	2	0	1	69	5	0	4.37	.884
2010–11	Färjestad BK	SEL	32	19	12	—	0	1857	61	7	1.97	.926	9	8	1	562	22	0	2.35	.904
2011–12	Rockford IceHogs	AHL	21	6	10	—	0	1048	47	0	2.69	.903	—	—	—	—	—	—	—	—
2012–13	Färjestad BK	SEL	41	25	15	—	0	2453	66	7	1.61	.939	10	5	5	616	24	1	2.34	.922
2013–14	SKA Saint Petersburg	KHL	34	18	12	—	0	2049	67	3	1.96	.929	10	6	4	622	20	2	1.93	.940
2014–15	SKA Saint Petersburg	KHL	19	14	4	—	0	1105	44	1	2.39	.914	—	—	—	—	—	—	—	—
2014–15	Sibir Novosibirsk	KHL	21	14	5	—	0	1260	34	2	1.62	.945	14	8	5	803	21	1	1.57	.943
2015–16	Sibir Novosibirsk	KHL	52	26	15	—	0	3023	95	6	1.89	.938	9	5	4	524	16	2	1.83	.942
2016–17	Sibir Novosibirsk	KHL	15	5	4	—	0	795	26	2	1.96	.939	—	—	—	—	—	—	—	—
2017–18	Sibir Novosibirsk	KHL	37	14	17	—	1	1924	81	1	2.53	.917	—	—	—	—	—	—	—	—
2018–19	Lokomotiv Yaroslavl	KHL	20	9	6	—	3	1099	34	4	1.86	.922	6	2	3	248	9	1	2.18	.912
2019–20	Dinamo Riga	KHL	32	8	19	—	3	1836	77	2	2.52	.912	—	—	—	—	—	—	—	—
2020–21	Sparta Praha	ELH	11	8	2	—	0	626	17	1	1.63	.940	6	4	2	—	—	2	1.83	.938
2021–22	Sparta Praha	ELH	23	14	9	—	0	1327	58	1	2.62	.899	—	—	—	—	—	—	—	—
2021–22	Djurgårdens IF	SHL	8	4	4	—	0	478	19	1	2.38	.929	—	—	—	—	—	—	—	—
NHL totals			2	0	1	—	0	67	6	0	5.41	.850	—	—	—	—	—	—	—	—
KHL totals			230	108	82	—	14	—	—	21	2.10	.928	39	21	16	2197	66	6	1.80	.928

=== International ===
Year	Team	Event	GP	W	L	T	MIN	GA	SO	GAA	SV%
2005	Czech Republic	U18	1	0	0	0	48	1	0	1.24	.929
2013	Czech Republic	WC	3	1	2	0	297	7	0	1.42	.938
2014	Czech Republic	OG	2	0	0	0	70	2	0	1.72	.929
2014	Czech Republic	WC	10	5	4	0	576	22	2	2.29	.897
2015	Czech Republic	WC	2	0	1	0	88	8	0	5.44	.742
Junior totals			1	0	0	0	48	1	0	1.24	.929
Senior totals			17	6	7	0	1031	39	2	2.27	.899
