= Pekka Tuokkola =

Finnish ice hockey player

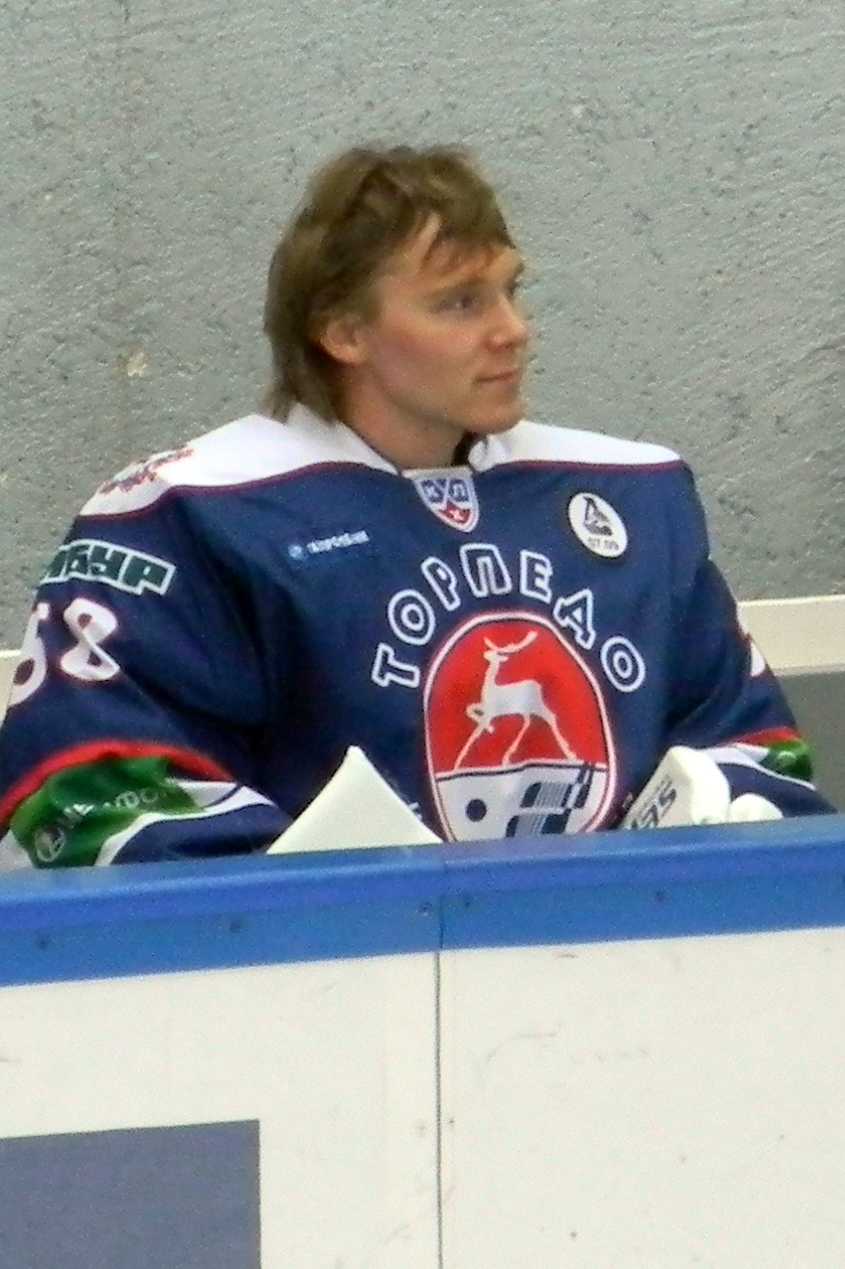
- Born: October 22, 1983 (age 41); Alavus, Finland
- Height: 6 ft 1 in (185 cm)
- Weight: 207 lb (94 kg; 14 st 11 lb)
- Position: Goaltender
- Caught: Left
- Played for: Tappara; JYP; Torpedo Nizhny Novgorod; KalPa; Färjestad BK; EC KAC; HC Bolzano
- Playing career: 2004–2019

Pekka Tuokkola (born October 22, 1983) is a Finnish former professional ice hockey goaltender currently signed with IK Kronan, Kronoby.

== Career ==
He has previously played in his native Finland with Tappara, JYP and KalPa in the Finnish Liiga. Tuokkola made his SM-liiga debut playing with Tappara during the 2004–05 season. He won the Finnish national championship with JYP in 2009 and received the Jari Kurri Trophy as Playoff MVP.

On May 21, 2014, Tuokkola as a free agent agreed to an optional two-year contract with Austrian club, EC KAC of the EBEL. He left the Klagenfurt-based club following the 2015–16 season, returning to JYP.
