= Magnus Nygren =

Swedish ice hockey player (born 1990)

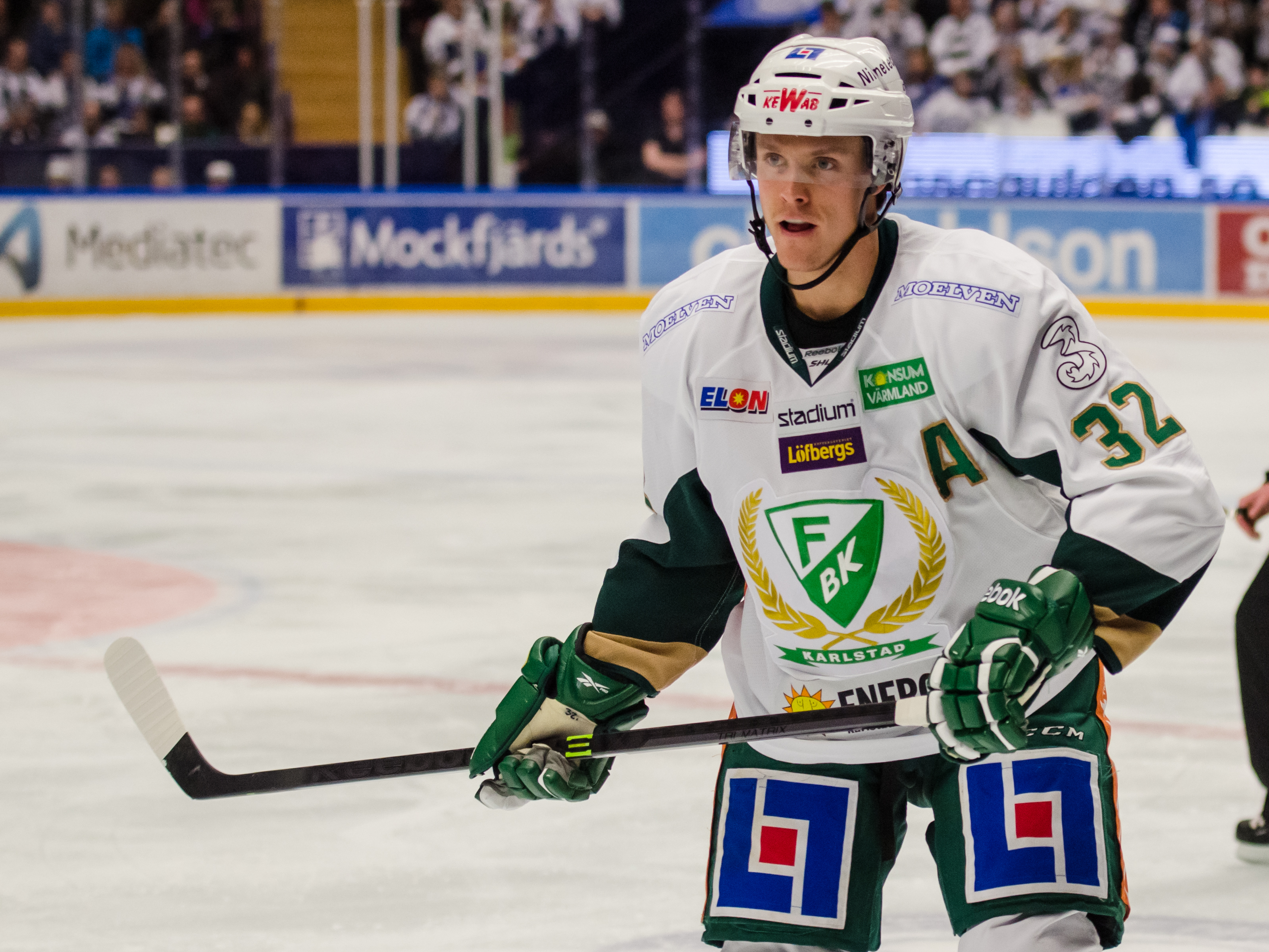
- Magnus Nygren playing for Färjestads BK in December 2013
- Born: 7 June 1990 (age 36) Karlstad, Sweden
- Height: 185 cm (6 ft 1 in)
- Weight: 87 kg (192 lb; 13 st 10 lb)
- Position: Defence
- Shoots: Right
- SHL team Former teams: Färjestad BK; HC Davos
- National team: Sweden
- NHL draft: 113th overall, 2011; Montreal Canadiens
- Playing career: 2009–present

Magnus Nygren (born 7 June 1990) is a Swedish professional ice hockey defenceman for Färjestad BK of the Swedish Hockey League (SHL). He was selected in the fourth round, 113th overall, by the Montreal Canadiens in the 2011 NHL entry draft.

== Playing career ==
On 21 May 2013, he was signed to a two-year entry-level contract with the Montreal Canadiens. During his first season in North America in 2013–14, Nygren was assigned to American Hockey League affiliate, the Hamilton Bulldogs. However after 16 games Nygren opted to return home to play on loan with Färjestad BK on 27 November 2013.

Nygren returned to the Bulldogs for the final year of his contract with the Canadiens, however was limited to 15 games due to injury. At season's end, Nygren unsurprisingly returned to Färjestad BK on a one-year contract for the 2015–16 season on 8 May 2015.

On 12 April 2017, Nygren agreed to a one-year contract with HC Davos of the National League (NL). On November 3, 2017, Nygren was signed to an early one-year contract extension by HC Davos. On 28 December 2018, Nygren agreed to an early two-year contract extension to remain with HC Davos through the 2020-21 season. On 23 March 2021, Nygren agreed to an early three-year contract extension with HC Davos through the 2023–24 season.

== Career statistics ==
=== Regular season and playoffs ===
| | | | Regular season | | | | | Playoffs |
| Season | Team | League | GP | G | A | Pts | PIM | GP | G | A | Pts | PIM |
|---|---|---|---|---|---|---|---|---|---|---|---|---|
| 2006–07 | Färjestad BK | J18 Allsv | 7 | 0 | 4 | 4 | 4 | 8 | 1 | 2 | 3 | 6 |
| 2007–08 | Färjestad BK | J18 | 17 | 6 | 10 | 16 | 20 | — | — | — | — | — |
| 2007–08 | Färjestad BK | J18 Allsv | 14 | 3 | 9 | 12 | 41 | 8 | 2 | 6 | 8 | 12 |
| 2008–09 | Skåre BK | SWE.2 U20 | 2 | 2 | 3 | 5 | 0 | — | — | — | — | — |
| 2008–09 | Skåre BK | SWE.3 | 41 | 7 | 21 | 28 | 32 | — | — | — | — | — |
| 2009–10 | Färjestad BK | SEL | 9 | 0 | 0 | 0 | 4 | — | — | — | — | — |
| 2009–10 | Skåre BK | SWE.3 | 24 | 9 | 18 | 27 | 10 | — | — | — | — | — |
| 2009–10 | Mora IK | Allsv | 21 | 2 | 5 | 7 | 10 | 2 | 0 | 1 | 1 | 2 |
| 2010–11 | Färjestad BK | SEL | 22 | 4 | 11 | 15 | 4 | 14 | 3 | 7 | 10 | 6 |
| 2010–11 | Bofors IK | Allsv | 35 | 5 | 6 | 11 | 10 | — | — | — | — | — |
| 2011–12 | Färjestad BK | J20 | 1 | 1 | 0 | 1 | 2 | — | — | — | — | — |
| 2011–12 | Färjestad BK | SEL | 50 | 7 | 11 | 18 | 6 | 10 | 2 | 0 | 2 | 0 |
| 2011–12 | BIK Karlskoga | Allsv | 3 | 1 | 1 | 2 | 4 | — | — | — | — | — |
| 2012–13 | Färjestad BK | SEL | 51 | 13 | 19 | 32 | 49 | 10 | 1 | 3 | 4 | 10 |
| 2013–14 | Hamilton Bulldogs | AHL | 16 | 1 | 7 | 8 | 14 | — | — | — | — | — |
| 2013–14 | Färjestad BK | SHL | 25 | 12 | 8 | 20 | 8 | 15 | 2 | 3 | 5 | 6 |
| 2014–15 | Hamilton Bulldogs | AHL | 15 | 4 | 6 | 10 | 2 | — | — | — | — | — |
| 2015–16 | Färjestad BK | SHL | 47 | 8 | 18 | 26 | 24 | 5 | 1 | 1 | 2 | 4 |
| 2016–17 | Färjestad BK | SHL | 49 | 11 | 20 | 31 | 26 | 7 | 2 | 3 | 5 | 2 |
| 2017–18 | HC Davos | NL | 47 | 9 | 23 | 32 | 26 | 6 | 3 | 3 | 6 | 4 |
| 2018–19 | HC Davos | NL | 36 | 7 | 11 | 18 | 18 | — | — | — | — | — |
| 2019–20 | HC Davos | NL | 26 | 3 | 11 | 14 | 12 | — | — | — | — | — |
| 2020–21 | HC Davos | NL | 48 | 14 | 21 | 35 | 38 | 3 | 0 | 2 | 2 | 4 |
| 2021–22 | HC Davos | NL | 51 | 6 | 19 | 25 | 20 | 7 | 0 | 2 | 2 | 29 |
| 2022–23 | HC Davos | NL | 34 | 3 | 14 | 17 | 6 | — | — | — | — | — |
| 2023–24 | Färjestad BK | SHL | 50 | 5 | 18 | 23 | 8 | 4 | 0 | 0 | 0 | 0 |
| 2024–25 | Färjestad BK | SHL | 51 | 7 | 20 | 27 | 16 | 3 | 1 | 0 | 1 | 2 |
| SHL totals | | | 354 | 67 | 125 | 192 | 145 | 68 | 12 | 17 | 29 | 30 |
| NL totals | | | 242 | 42 | 99 | 141 | 120 | 16 | 3 | 7 | 10 | 37 |

Medal record

Representing Sweden

Ice hockey

World Championships
| Bronze medal – third place | 2014 Minsk | |

=== International ===
| Year | Team | Event | Result | GP | G | A | Pts | PIM |
|---|---|---|---|---|---|---|---|---|
| 2014 | Sweden | WC | 3rd place, bronze medalist(s) | 10 | 1 | 4 | 5 | 2 |
| 2016 | Sweden | WC | 6th | 5 | 1 | 1 | 2 | 4 |
| 2021 | Sweden | WC | 9th | 7 | 1 | 2 | 3 | 6 |
| Senior totals | | | | 22 | 3 | 7 | 10 | 12 |
