= Fredrik Pettersson-Wentzel =

Swedish ice hockey player

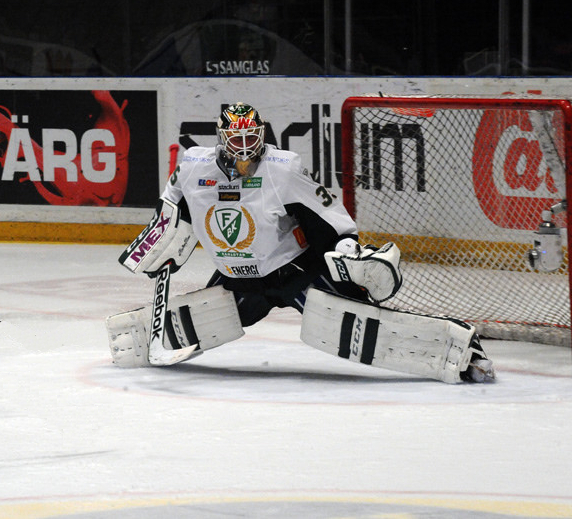
- Born: July 23, 1991 (age 34) Uppsala, Sweden
- Height: 6 ft 1 in (185 cm)
- Weight: 176 lb (80 kg; 12 st 8 lb)
- Position: Goaltender
- Catches: Left
- NL team Former teams: ZSC Lions; Timrå IK; Färjestad BK; HV71; Düsseldorfer EG
- NHL draft: 128th overall, 2010; Atlanta Thrashers
- Playing career: 2009–present

Fredrik Pettersson-Wentzel (born July 23, 1991) is a Swedish professional ice hockey goaltender who is currently playing for the ZSC Lions in the National League (NL).

== Playing career ==
Pettersson-Wentzel was drafted 128th overall by the Atlanta Thrashers in the 2010 NHL entry draft. He led Allsvenskan goaltenders in GAA for the 2009–10 season, but after failing to produce similar numbers in the following season Pettersson-Wentzel chose to sign with Timrå in Elitserien for the second half of the 2010–11 season. Pettersson-Wentzel's Elitserien debut came on January 22, 2011 in relief of Juha Pitkämäki.

After his third season with HV71 in 2017–18, Pettersson-Wentzel left Sweden as a free agent and agreed to a one-year contract with German outfit, Düsseldorfer EG of the DEL, on March 21, 2018. Following his lone season in 2018–19 with Düsseldorfer EG. Wentzel was not offered a new contract with Düsseldorfer on April 6, 2019.

On 31 May 2019, Pettersson-Wentzel returned to his native Sweden, agreeing to a one-year contract with newly promoted SHL club, IK Oskarshamn.

== International play ==
Pettersson-Wentzel represented Sweden at the 2011 World Junior Ice Hockey Championships along with Robin Lehner.

== Career statistics ==
=== Regular season ===
Season	Team	League	GP	W	L	T	MIN	GA	SO	GAA	SV%
2009–10	Almtuna	Allsvenskan	37	—	—	—	2134:59	66	6	1.85	.924

=== Playoffs ===
Season	Team	League	GP	W	L	MIN	GA	SO	GAA	SV%
2010	Almtuna	Kvalserien	5	—	—	310:57	11	0	2.12	.922

=== International statistics ===
Year	Team	Comp	Result	GP	W	L	T	MIN	GA	SO	GAA	SV%
2011	Sweden	WJC	4th	3	—	—	—	178:30	8	0	2.69	.895

== Awards and honors ==
Award	Year
SHL
Le Mat trophy (HV71)	2017
