= Patrik Lundh =

Swedish ice hockey player

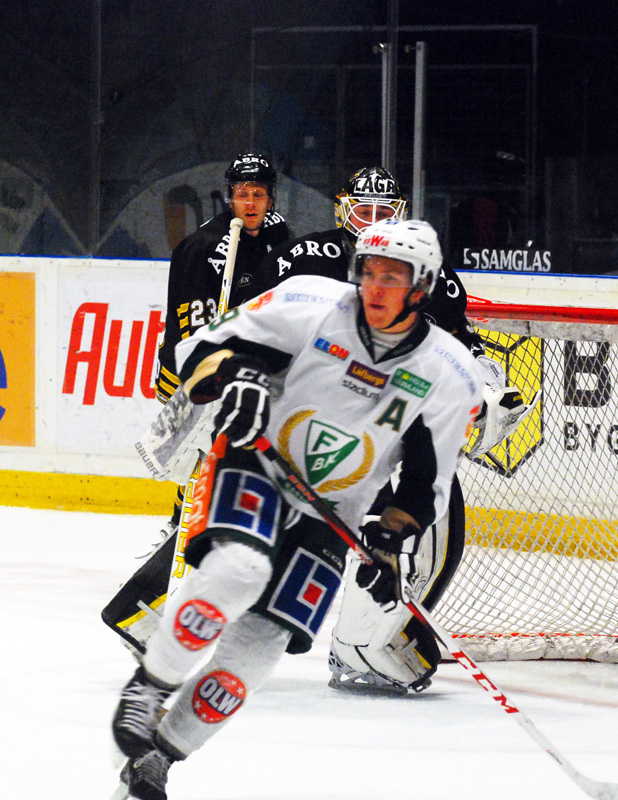
- Born: June 12, 1988 (age 37) Stockholm, Sweden
- Height: 5 ft 11 in (180 cm)
- Weight: 176 lb (80 kg; 12 st 8 lb)
- Position: Centre
- Shot: Left
- Played for: Djurgårdens IF; Almtuna IS; Malmö Redhawks; BIK Karlskoga; Färjestad BK; Växjö Lakers; Kunlun Red Star; Linköping HC; Schwenninger Wild Wings
- Playing career: 2006–2024

Patrik Lundh (born June 12, 1988) is a Swedish professional ice hockey centre for Färjestad BK of the Swedish Hockey League (SHL).

== Playing career ==
Lundh began his professional career with Djurgårdens IF in the Swedish Hockey League (SHL) before moving on to play with Färjestad BK (2010–2014), and Växjö Lakers (2014–2016), claiming the SHL championship with each club before returning to Djurgårdens IF in 2016.

On May 1, 2018, Lundh left Sweden for the first time in his career and signed a one-year contract with Chinese outfit, Kunlun Red Star of the Kontinental Hockey League (KHL).

After concluding his contract with Kunlun, Lundh returned to Sweden having completed one year in the KHL to sign an optional two-year contract with Linköping HC of the SHL on July 17, 2019. On April 29, 2021, Lundh signed with Schwenninger Wild Wings of the Deutsche Eishockey Liga (DEL).

Lundh returned to Färjestad BK of the SHL signing a two-year contract on December 31, 2021, and then signed a one-year contract extension on March 6, 2023.

== Career statistics ==
			Regular season					Playoffs
Season	Team	League	GP	G	A	Pts	PIM	GP	G	A	Pts	PIM
2003–04	Lidingö Vikings J18	J18 Div.2	—	—	—	—	—	—	—	—	—	—
2004–05	Djurgårdens IF J18	J18 Elit	21	14	15	29	41	—	—	—	—	—
2004–05	Djurgårdens IF J18	J18 Allsvenskan	5	3	4	7	36	6	1	0	1	2
2004–05	Djurgårdens IF J20	J20 SuperElit	17	1	5	6	4	—	—	—	—	—
2005–06	Djurgårdens IF J18	J18 Elit	1	0	5	5	0	—	—	—	—	—
2005–06	Djurgårdens IF J18	J18 Allsvenskan	—	—	—	—	—	3	0	0	0	4
2005–06	Djurgårdens IF J20	J20 SuperElit	39	17	15	32	59	4	0	1	1	4
2006–07	Djurgårdens IF J20	J20 SuperElit	38	18	33	51	40	7	0	6	6	2
2006–07	Djurgårdens IF	Elitserien	9	0	0	0	2	—	—	—	—	—
2006–07	Almtuna IS	HockeyAllsvenskan	5	0	1	1	0	—	—	—	—	—
2007–08	Malmö Redhawks J20	J20 SuperElit	3	1	1	2	2	6	3	2	5	6
2007–08	Malmö Redhawks	HockeyAllsvenskan	40	2	11	13	39	7	0	0	0	0
2008–09	Bofors IK	HockeyAllsvenskan	44	10	20	30	32	—	—	—	—	—
2009–10	Bofors IK	HockeyAllsvenskan	45	15	24	39	48	2	1	0	1	2
2010–11	Färjestad BK	Elitserien	55	12	14	26	28	12	1	4	5	6
2011–12	Färjestad BK	Elitserien	54	11	13	24	28	11	2	8	10	4
2012–13	Färjestad BK	Elitserien	50	7	9	16	51	10	2	0	2	6
2013–14	Färjestad BK	SHL	55	6	15	21	38	15	4	2	6	4
2014–15	Växjö Lakers HC	SHL	53	9	13	22	26	18	0	1	1	6
2015–16	Växjö Lakers HC	SHL	47	10	13	23	8	13	2	0	2	6
2016–17	Djurgårdens IF	SHL	46	6	16	22	6	3	1	0	1	4
2017–18	Djurgårdens IF	SHL	52	15	25	40	12	11	2	8	10	2
2018–19	Kunlun Red Star	KHL	61	6	15	21	6	—	—	—	—	—
2019–20	Linköping HC	SHL	47	4	10	14	12	—	—	—	—	—
2020–21	Linköping HC	SHL	52	14	14	28	10	—	—	—	—	—
2021–22	Schwenninger Wild Wings	DEL	28	1	1	2	8	—	—	—	—	—
2021–22	Färjestad BK	SHL	20	1	2	3	2	16	2	3	5	29
2022–23	Färjestad BK	SHL	50	4	12	16	10	7	0	1	1	4
2023–24	Färjestad BK	SHL	49	4	5	9	8	3	0	0	0	2
KHL totals			61	6	15	21	6	—	—	—	—	—
SHL (Elitserien) totals			639	103	161	264	241	119	16	27	43	73
HockeyAllsvenskan totals			134	27	56	83	119	9	1	0	1	2
DEL totals			28	1	1	2	8	—	—	—	—	—

== Awards and honours ==
Award	Year
SHL
Le Mat Trophy champion	2011, 2015, 2022
