= Joakim Hillding =

Swedish ice hockey player

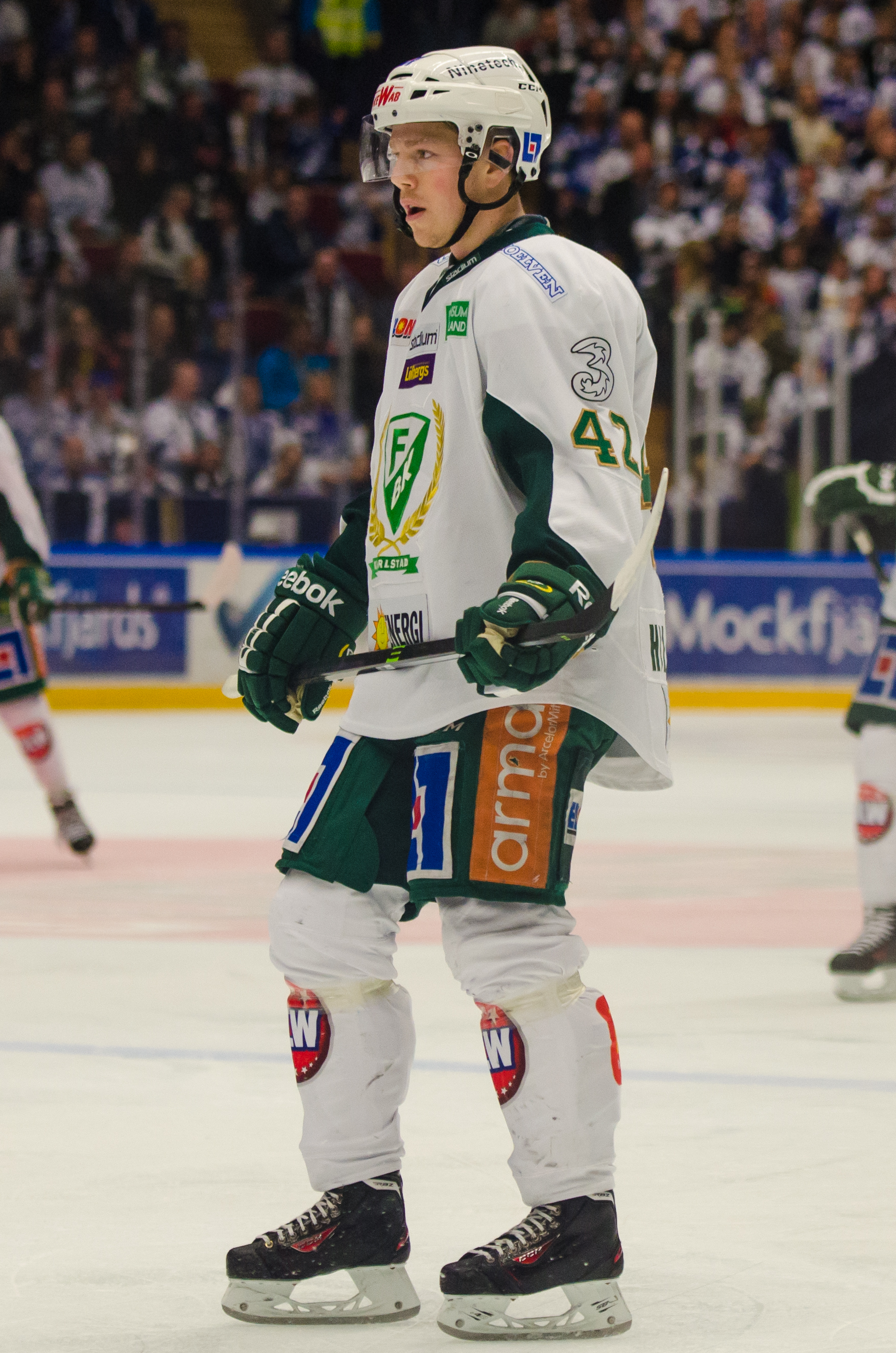
- Born: May 30, 1988 (age 36); Ängelholm, Sweden
- Height: 5 ft 10 in (178 cm)
- Weight: 181 lb (82 kg; 12 st 13 lb)
- Position: Centre
- Shot: Left
- Played for: HV71; Stjernen Hockey; Växjö Lakers; Färjestads BK; Luleå HF; Lukko; Graz99ers; Västerås IK; IF Troja-Ljungby
- Playing career: 2007–2023

Joakim Hillding (born May 30, 1988) is a Swedish professional ice hockey player. He is currently playing with Troja-Ljungby in the HockeyAllsvenskan (Allsv).

== Playing career ==
After four seasons in the SHL with Färjestad BK, Hillding left as a free agent to sign a two-year contract in a return to former club, the Växjö Lakers, with whom he played during their tenure in the HockeyAllsvenskan on April 28, 2015.

Hillding played the 2018–19 season, helping IK Oskarshamn gain promotion to the SHL for the first time in their history. He posted 29 points in 49 games, and notched 12 points in 12 as a large contributor in their qualification games.

As a free agent, Hillding opted not to continue with Oskarshamn, accepting a one-year contract to play in Austria with the Graz 99ers of the EBEL on 2 July 2019.

== Career statistics ==
			Regular season					Playoffs
Season	Team	League	GP	G	A	Pts	PIM	GP	G	A	Pts	PIM
2002–03	Rögle BK U16	U16 SM	5	0	1	1	4	—	—	—	—	—
2003–04	Rögle BK J18	J18 Allsvenskan	1	0	0	0	0	—	—	—	—	—
2004–05	Rögle BK J18	J18 Allsvenskan	14	6	8	14	28	—	—	—	—	—
2005–06	Rögle BK J20	J20 SuperElit	39	10	10	20	69	—	—	—	—	—
2006–07	HV71 J20	J20 SuperElit	34	13	13	26	26	4	0	2	2	0
2007–08	HV71 J20	J20 SuperElit	33	19	24	43	32	3	0	0	0	0
2007–08	HV71	Elitserien	4	0	0	0	0	—	—	—	—	—
2007–08	Stjernen Hockey	Norway	12	1	1	2	12	—	—	—	—	—
2008–09	Tingsryds AIF	Division 1	38	15	25	40	26	10	2	4	6	4
2009–10	Tingsryds AIF	Division 1	34	13	37	50	16	10	1	4	5	6
2010–11	Växjö Lakers HC	HockeyAllsvenskan	52	21	17	38	40	10	4	4	8	6
2011–12	Färjestad BK	Elitserien	53	4	9	13	20	11	0	2	2	0
2012–13	Färjestad BK	Elitserien	54	6	14	20	22	10	1	5	6	2
2013–14	Färjestad BK	SHL	55	18	23	41	22	15	3	2	5	35
2014–15	Färjestad BK	SHL	44	5	17	22	18	—	—	—	—	—
2015–16	Växjö Lakers HC	SHL	45	9	10	19	10	10	1	2	3	4
2016–17	Växjö Lakers HC	SHL	24	3	3	6	8	—	—	—	—	—
2016–17	Luleå HF	SHL	20	0	3	3	8	2	0	0	0	0
2017–18	Lukko	Liiga	34	4	4	8	12	—	—	—	—	—
2018–19	IK Oskarshamn	HockeyAllsvenskan	49	12	17	29	34	12	6	6	12	6
2019–20	Graz 99ers	EBEL	47	19	17	36	18	3	0	2	2	6
2020–21	Västerås IK	HockeyAllsvenskan	33	6	13	19	18	6	0	2	2	8
2021–22	IF Troja-Ljungby	HockeyAllsvenskan	49	16	24	40	24	—	—	—	—	—
2022–23	IF Troja-Ljungby	Hockeyettan	31	6	21	27	6	2	0	1	1	0
Elitserien/SHL totals			299	45	79	124	108	48	5	11	16	41
HockeyAllsvenskan totals			183	55	71	126	116	28	10	12	22	20
