= Rickard Wallin =

Swedish ice hockey player

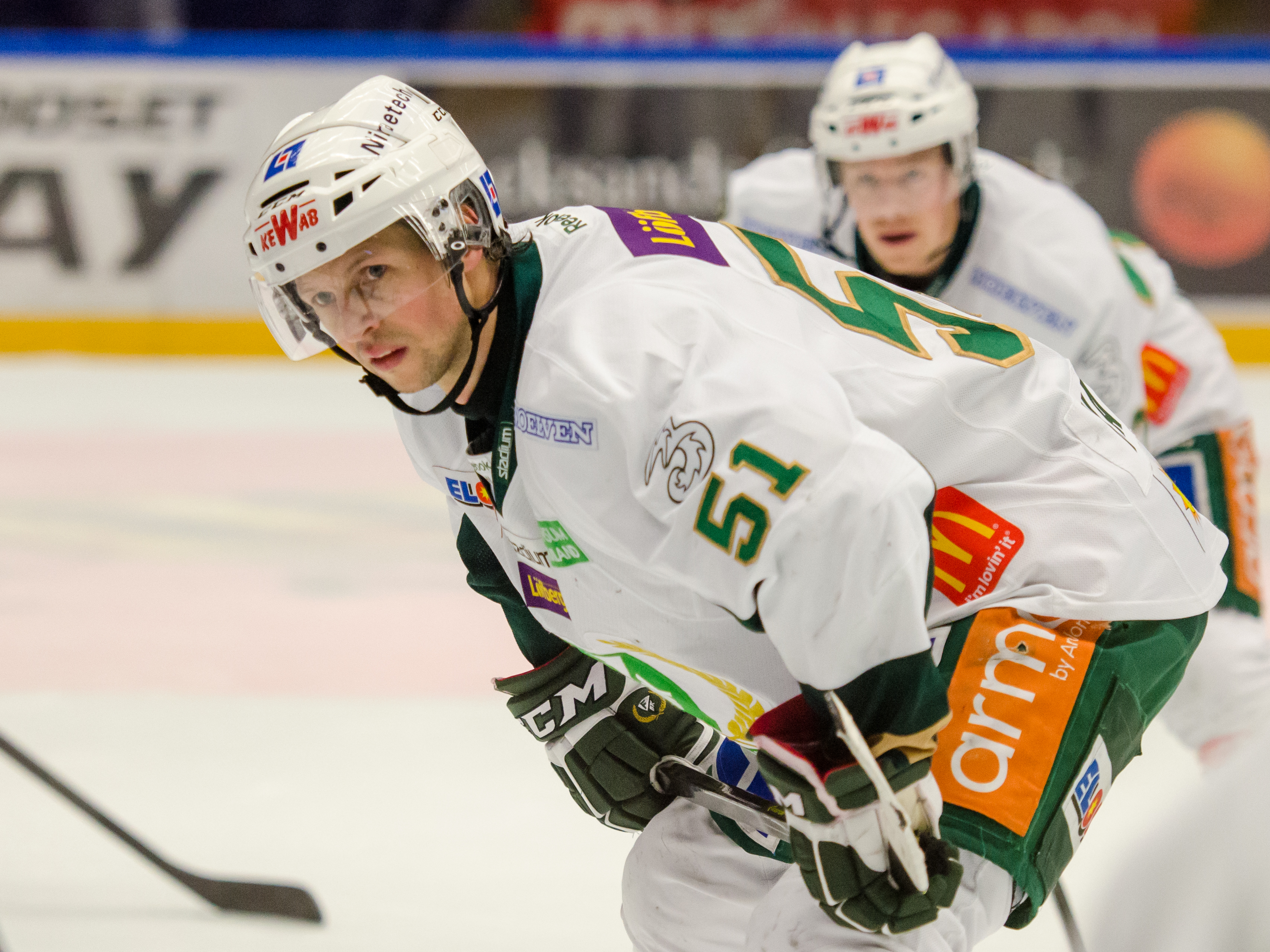
- Born: April 9, 1980 (age 46) Stockholm, Sweden
- Height: 6 ft 2 in (188 cm)
- Weight: 194 lb (88 kg; 13 st 12 lb)
- Position: Centre
- Shot: Left
- Played for: NHL; Minnesota Wild; Toronto Maple Leafs; NLA; Lugano; Elitserien (SEL); Färjestad
- National team: Sweden
- NHL draft: 160th overall, 1998; Phoenix Coyotes
- Playing career: 1999–2016

Carl Rickard Wallin (born April 9, 1980) is a Swedish former professional ice hockey centre who last played for Färjestad of the Elitserien (SEL).

== Playing career ==
Wallin made his debut in the Swedish Hockey League with Färjestad BK during the 1998-99 season. He was drafted in 1998 NHL entry draft in the 6th round as the 160th overall pick by the Phoenix Coyotes. Before playing any games with the Coyotes, Wallin was traded to the Minnesota Wild for Joé Juneau on June 23, 2000. After winning the Swedish Championship with Färjestad in 2002, Wallin signed with the Wild during the summer of 2002. Wallin spent three years in the Wild organisation, playing 19 games with the Wild and scoring ten points (six goals and four assists). In September 2005, he returned to Sweden and Färjestad. That season, he won his second Swedish Championship. After the season, he signed with Lugano of the Swiss Nationalliga A, but he stayed only one season with Lugano. He returned to Färjestad in 2007 and, serving as team captain, helped the team win another SHL title in 2009.

Wallin signed a one-year contract with the Toronto Maple Leafs on July 9, 2009. In returning to the NHL Wallin played in a career high 60 games but was unable to contribute consistently offensively with 2 goals and 7 assists for just 9 points in the 2009–10 season.

On May 25, 2010, Rickard returned to Färjestad of the SEL, signing a four-year contract. He won his fourth SHL title in the 2010-11 season.

On April 27, 2016, Wallin officially announced his retirement.

== International career ==
He won 109 caps for the Swedish national team, winning a silver medal at the 2011 World Championships and bronze at the 2009 and 2010 World Championships.

== Career statistics ==
=== Regular season and playoffs ===
			Regular season					Playoffs
Season	Team	League	GP	G	A	Pts	PIM	GP	G	A	Pts	PIM
1996–97	Västerås IK	J20	26	3	3	6	—	—	—	—	—	—
1997–98	Färjestad BK	J20	29	20	30	50	32	—	—	—	—	—
1998–99	Färjestad BK	J20	36	20	32	52	56	—	—	—	—	—
1998–99	Färjestad	SEL	5	0	0	0	0	—	—	—	—	—
1999–00	IF Troja-Ljungby	SWE-2	46	15	22	37	54	—	—	—	—	—
2000–01	Färjestad	SEL	47	9	22	31	24	16	11	3	14	4
2001–02	Färjestad	SEL	50	12	31	43	56	10	4	9	13	8
2002–03	Houston Aeros	AHL	52	13	22	35	70	23	4	11	15	22
2002–03	Minnesota Wild	NHL	4	1	0	1	0	—	—	—	—	—
2003–04	Houston Aeros	AHL	47	14	18	32	36	2	0	0	0	2
2003–04	Minnesota Wild	NHL	15	5	4	9	14	—	—	—	—	—
2004–05	Houston Aeros	AHL	79	12	31	43	61	5	1	0	1	29
2005–06	Färjestad	SEL	50	11	19	30	82	18	6	3	9	28
2006–07	Lugano	NLA	44	14	35	49	87	—	—	—	—	—
2007–08	Färjestad	SEL	55	17	23	40	54	12	1	5	6	8
2008–09	Färjestad	SEL	55	18	27	45	56	13	1	4	5	8
2009–10	Toronto Maple Leafs	NHL	60	2	7	9	10	—	—	—	—	—
2010–11	Färjestad	SEL	32	9	12	21	20	14	4	9	13	12
2011–12	Färjestad	SEL	53	9	18	27	42	—	—	—	—	—
2012–13	Färjestad	SEL	48	11	27	38	42	10	2	4	6	6
2013–14	Färjestad	SHL	43	4	4	8	28	15	4	1	5	12
2014–15	Färjestad	SHL	55	2	13	15	52	—	—	—	—	—
2015–16	Färjestad	SHL	49	4	9	13	28	5	1	1	2	0
2016–17	HC Flyers	SWE-4	1	0	1	1	0	—	—	—	—	—
2018–19	Arvika HC	SWE-4	1	1	0	1	0	—	—	—	—	—
SEL totals			542	106	205	311	484	127	39	43	82	108
NHL totals			79	8	11	19	34	—	—	—	—	—

=== International ===
Rickard Wallin
Medal record

Representing Sweden

Ice hockey

World Championships
Silver medal – second place	2011 Slovakia	
Bronze medal – third place	2010 Germany	
Bronze medal – third place	2009 Switzerland	

Year	Team	Event	Results	GP	G	A	Pts	PIM
1998	Sweden	WJC	6th	7	2	2	4	0
2007	Sweden	WC	4th	9	2	0	2	6
2008	Sweden	WC	4th	9	2	3	5	4
2009	Sweden	WC	3rd place, bronze medalist(s)	9	1	0	1	8
2010	Sweden	WC	3rd place, bronze medalist(s)	9	1	5	6	0
2011	Sweden	WC	2nd place, silver medalist(s)	9	0	0	0	4
Junior totals				7	2	2	4	0
Senior totals				45	6	8	14	22

Preceded by Jörgen Jönsson	Färjestad captains 2008–2009	Succeeded by Sanny Lindström
