= 2010–11 AIK IF season =

Swedish ice hockey club season

2010–11 AIK
- 2010–11 record: 20–23–12
- Home record: 13–10–4
- Road record: 7–13–8
- Goals for: 131
- Goals against: 151

Team information
- General manager: Anders Gozzi
- Coach: Roger Melin
- Assistant coach: Gunnar Persson
- Captain: Dick Tärnström
- Alternate captains: David Engblom; Mattias Beck
- Arena: Hovet
- Average attendance: 5,614

Team leaders
- Goals: Richard Gynge (12)
- Assists: Oscar Steen (18)
- Points: Oscar Steen (28)
- Penalty minutes: Patric Blomdahl (92)
- Goals against average: Viktor Fasth (2.26)

The 2010–11 Elitserien season was AIK's 26th season in the Elitserien ice hockey league. It was AIK's first season in Elitserien since the 2001–02 Elitserien season. The regular season started on 15 September 2010 at home against Linköpings HC and ended on 5 March 2010 at home against Modo Hockey. The following playoffs ended on 27 March for AIK. The season followed AIK's re-establishment in Elitserien, Sweden's top ice hockey league.

AIK's first season in Elitserien in nine years was a major success. Despite expected by many hockey experts to be forced to play in the Kvalserien qualification for Elitserien, AIK managed to capture the 8th and last playoff spot. This meant that the team's first playoffs in ten years (the team qualified for the playoffs in the 2000–01 season) was true. The team finished the regular season with 76 points, which statistically was an Elitserien record for a newcomer. The team further surprised many in the playoffs when they beat regular season champions HV71 4–0 in the quarterfinals and thus advanced to the semifinals, where AIK met Färjestads BK, who ended up second in the regular season. However, Färjestad knocked out AIK in the semifinals, beating AIK 4–0.

== Pre-season ==
=== Game log ===
All times are local (CEST).

2010 AIK exhibition games log; 4–6–1 (Home: 1–3–0; Away: 3–3–1)

August: 3–3–0 (Home: 1–2–0; Away: 2–1–0)
#	Date	Away	Score	Home	OT	Goaltender	Attendance	Protocol	Ref
1	7 August, 16:00	AIK	7–1	Nynäshamns IF		Heino-Lindberg/Lundström/Fasth	300	1–0–0
2	17 August, 19:00	Almtuna IS	0–1	AIK		Viktor Fasth	299	2–0–0
3	19 August, 19:00	AIK	3–2	Södertälje SK		Christopher Heino-Lindberg	990	3–0–0
4	25 August, 19:00	Timrå IK	3–0	AIK		Viktor Fasth	1,000	3–1–0
5	26 August, 19:00	Brynäs IF	4–2	AIK		Niklas Lundström	2,541	3–2–0
6	28 August, 16:00	AIK	2–4	Luleå HF		Viktor Fasth	800	3–3–0

September: 1–3–1 (Home: 0–1–0; Away: 1–2–1)
#	Date	Away	Score	Home	OT	Goaltender	Attendance	Protocol	Ref
7	1 September, 19:00	AIK	1–2	Almtuna IS	SO	Viktor Fasth	636	3–3–1
8	4 September, 15:00	AIK	0–4	Ak Bars Kazan		Christopher Heino-Lindberg	740	3–4–1
9	5 September, 18:00	AIK	2–4	JYP		Viktor Fasth	1,215	3–5–1
10	7 September, 18:30	AIK	3–2	HPK		Christopher Heino-Lindberg	1,215	4–5–1
11	9 September, 19:00	Södertälje SK	3–1	AIK		Viktor Fasth	500	4–6–1

Legend: Win Overtime win Loss Overtime loss

== Regular season ==
=== Standings ===
2010–11 Elitserien season	GP	W	L	OTW/SOW	OTL/SOL	GF	GA	Pts
HV71^{y}	55	24	16	9	6	173	143	96
Färjestads BK^{x}	55	27	19	6	3	154	124	96
Skellefteå AIK^{x}	55	25	18	9	3	173	145	96
Luleå HF^{x}	55	23	21	8	3	129	115	88
Linköpings HC^{x}	55	22	19	5	9	138	118	85
Djurgårdens IF^{x}	55	22	19	4	10	140	139	84
Brynäs IF^{x}	55	19	20	8	8	147	157	81
AIK^{x}	55	20	23	4	8	131	151	76
Frölunda HC^{e}	55	19	24	5	7	128	158	74
Timrå IK^{e}	55	17	25	9	4	140	165	73
Södertälje SK^{r}	55	20	26	2	7	132	164	71
Modo Hockey^{r}	55	17	25	6	7	147	153	70

x – clinched playoff spot; y – clinched regular season league title; e – eliminated from playoff contention; r – will play in relegation series

=== Game log ===
All times are local (CEST and CET).

2010–11 AIK IF regulation games log; 20–23–12 (Home: 13–10–4; Away: 7–13–8)

September: 1–3–2 (Home: 1–1–1; Away: 0–2–1)
#	Date	Away	Score	Home	OT	Goaltender	Attendance	Protocol	Pts	Ref
1	15, 19 September:00	Linköpings HC	5 – 1	AIK		Christopher Heino-Lindberg	6,823	0–1–0	0
2	21, 19 September:00	AIK	1 – 0	Frölunda HC	OT	Viktor Fasth	9,198	0–1–1	2
3	23, 19 September:00	Södertälje SK	5 – 4	AIK	OT	Viktor Fasth	3,471	0–1–2	3
4	25, 16 September:00	AIK	0 – 3	Färjestads BK		Christopher Heino-Lindberg	6,958	0–2–2	3
6	28, 19 September:00	Djurgårdens IF	2 – 5	AIK		Viktor Fasth	13,850	1–2–2	6
5	30, 19 September:00	AIK	2 – 3	Skellefteå AIK		Christopher Heino-Lindberg	4,708	1–3–2	6

October: 4–5–1 (Home: 2–3–0; Away: 2–2–1)
#	Date	Away	Score	Home	OT	Goaltender	Attendance	Protocol	Pts	Ref
7	5, 19 October:00	AIK	0 – 1	Luleå HF		Viktor Fasth	5,515	1–4–2	6
8	7, 19 October:00	Brynäs IF	3 – 2	AIK		Viktor Fasth	3,936	1–5–2	6
9	9, 18 October:30	AIK	1 – 2	HV71	SO	Viktor Fasth	6,953	1–5–3	7
10	14, 19 October:00	Modo Hockey	3 – 4	AIK		Viktor Fasth	3,626	2–5–3	10
11	16, 18 October:30	AIK	4 – 1	Timrå IK		Viktor Fasth	5,512	3–5–3	13
13	18, 19 October:00	HV71	7 – 3	AIK		Viktor Fasth	4,528	3–6–3	13
12	21, 19 October:00	AIK	2 – 3	Södertälje SK		Viktor Fasth	4,822	3–7–3	13
14	26, 19 October:00	Luleå HF	3 – 0	AIK		Viktor Fasth	4,147	3–8–3	13
15	28, 19 October:00	AIK	3 – 0	Brynäs IF		Viktor Fasth	5,901	4–8–3	16
16	30, 16 October:00	Linköpings HC	1 – 2	AIK		Viktor Fasth	3,153	5–8–3	19

November: 5–3–1 (Home: 3–1–0; Away: 2–2–1)
#	Date	Away	Score	Home	OT	Goaltender	Attendance	Protocol	Pts	Ref
17	1, 19 November:00	Frölunda HC	2 – 5	AIK		Viktor Fasth	4,083	6–8–3	22
18	4, 19 November:00	AIK	5 – 2	Djurgårdens IF		Viktor Fasth	13,850	7–8–3	25
19	6, 16 November:00	AIK	4 – 1	Timrå IK		Viktor Fasth	4,971	8–8–3	28
23	16, 19 November:00	Södertälje SK	2 – 5	AIK		Viktor Fasth	6,328	9–8–3	31
20	18, 19 November:00	AIK	1 – 2	Modo Hockey	OT	Viktor Fasth	5,478	9–8–4	32
21	21, 16 November:00	Skellefteå AIK	2 – 4	AIK		Viktor Fasth	6,578	10–8–4	35
22	23, 19 November:00	AIK	1 – 2	Färjestads BK		Vesa Toskala	5,960	10–9–4	35
24	27, 16 November:00	AIK	3 – 4	Frölunda HC		Viktor Fasth	9,004	10–10–4	35
25	29, 19 November:00	Brynäs IF	5 – 2	AIK		Vesa Toskala	4,536	10–11–4	35

December: 1–4–3 (Home: 1–2–0; Away: 0–2–3)
#	Date	Away	Score	Home	OT	Goaltender	Attendance	Protocol	Pts	Ref
27	4, 16 December:00	AIK	1 – 2	Skellefteå AIK	SO	Viktor Fasth	5,218	10–11–5	36
28	6, 19 December:00	Färjestads BK	6 – 1	AIK		Viktor Fasth / Björn Bjurling	4,625	10–12–5	36
29	9, 19 December:00	AIK	1 – 2	Luleå HF	OT	Viktor Fasth	4,870	10–12–6	37
30	11, 16 December:00	Timrå IK	2 – 7	AIK		Viktor Fasth	3,853	11–12–6	40
26	22, 19 December:00	Djurgårdens IF	3 – 1	AIK		Viktor Fasth / Björn Bjurling	11,461	11–13–6	40
31	26, 16 December:00	AIK	3 – 2	Modo Hockey	OT	Björn Bjurling	7,547	11–13–7	42
32	28, 19 December:00	AIK	2 – 8	HV71		Björn Bjurling / Niklas Lundström	6,907	11–14–7	42
33	30, 19 December:00	AIK	1 – 4	Linköpings HC		Björn Bjurling	6,845	11–15–7	42

January: 4–5–2 (Home: 3–2–1; Away: 1–3–1)
#	Date	Away	Score	Home	OT	Goaltender	Attendance	Protocol	Pts	Ref
34	2, 16 January:00	Timrå IK	1 – 3	AIK		Björn Bjurling	3,632	12–15–7	45
37	8, 18 January:30	AIK	0 – 4	Linköpings HC		Björn Bjurling	7,183	12–16–7	45
35	11, 19 January:00	AIK	1 – 4	Djurgårdens IF		Björn Bjurling	11,893	12–17–7	45
39	16, 16 January:00	Frölunda HC	2 – 1	AIK		Viktor Fasth	3,764	12–18–7	45
36	18, 19 January:00	Skellefteå AIK	5 – 4	AIK	SO	Viktor Fasth	3,746	12–18–8	46
40	20, 19 January:00	AIK	2 – 4	Södertälje SK		Viktor Fasth	4,444	12–19–8	46
41	23, 16 January:00	HV71	2 – 3	AIK		Viktor Fasth	3,541	13–19–8	49
42	25, 19 January:00	AIK	3 – 2	Brynäs IF	SO	Viktor Fasth	5,153	13–19–9	51
43	27, 19 January:00	AIK	2 – 1	Luleå HF		Viktor Fasth	4,921	14–19–9	54
44	29, 16 January:00	Modo Hockey	3 – 5	AIK		Viktor Fasth	6,212	15–19–9	57
38	31, 19 January:00	Färjestads BK	3 – 1	AIK		Björn Bjurling	4,476	15–20–9	57

February: 3–3–2 (Home: 2–1–1; Away: 1–2–1)
#	Date	Away	Score	Home	OT	Goaltender	Attendance	Protocol	Pts	Ref
46	3, 19 February:00	AIK	1 – 6	Skellefteå AIK		Björn Bjurling	4,344	15–21–9	57
47	5, 16 February:00	Södertälje SK	2 – 3	AIK		Viktor Fasth	5,821	16–21–9	60
45	15, 19 February:00	Djurgårdens IF	2 – 1	AIK	SO	Viktor Fasth	11,316	16–21–10	61
48	17, 19 February:00	AIK	2 – 1	Frölunda HC	SO	Viktor Fasth	8,478	16–21–11	63
49	19, 16 February:00	AIK	1 – 2	HV71		Viktor Fasth	7,000	16–22–11	63
50	22, 19 February:00	Brynäs IF	1 – 4	AIK		Viktor Fasth	5,697	17–22–11	66
51	24, 19 February:00	Färjestads BK	3 – 0	AIK		Viktor Fasth	4,205	17–23–11	66
52	26, 16 February:00	AIK	3 – 1	Timrå IK		Viktor Fasth	5,568	18–23–11	69

March: 2–0–1 (Home: 1–0–1; Away: 1–0–0)
#	Date	Away	Score	Home	OT	Goaltender	Attendance	Protocol	Pts	Ref
53	1, 19 March:00	Luleå HF	2 – 1	AIK	SO	Viktor Fasth	6,542	18–23–12	70
54	3, 19 March:00	AIK	2 – 1	Linköpings HC		Viktor Fasth	7,013	19–23–12	73
55	5, 18 March:30	Modo Hockey	2 – 3	AIK		Viktor Fasth	7,636	20–23–12	76

Legend: Win (3 points) Overtime/Shootout win (2 points) Loss (0 points) Overtime/Shootout loss (1 point)

=== Statistics ===
==== Players ====
Player	Team	GP	G	A	+/–	PIM	Pts

==== Goaltenders ====
Player	Team	GP	TOI	SOG	GA	SO	GAA	SV%

== Playoffs ==
=== Game log ===
2011 playoffs; 4–4 (Home: 2–2; Away: 2–2)

Quarterfinals vs. (1) HV71: 4–0 (Home: 2–0; Away: 2–0)
Round	Date	Away	Results	Home	Goaltender	Attendance	Series	Ref
1	7 March	AIK	4–2	HV71	Viktor Fasth	6,791	1–0
2	9 March	HV71	0–3	AIK	Viktor Fasth	7,570	0–2
3	11 March	AIK	3–1	HV71	Viktor Fasth	7,000	3–0
4	15 March	HV71	1–4	AIK	Viktor Fasth	8,094	0–4

Semifinals vs. (2) Färjestads BK: 0–4 (Home: 0–2; Away: 0–2)
Round	Date	Away	Results	Home	Goaltender	Attendance	Series	Ref
1	22 March	AIK	1–2	Färjestads BK	Viktor Fasth	7,088	0–1
2	24 March	Färjestads BK	4–2	AIK	Viktor Fasth	8,094	2–0
3	26 March	AIK	2–4	Färjestads BK	Viktor Fasth	8,490	0–3
4	27 March	Färjestads BK	2–1	AIK	Viktor Fasth	13,850	4–0

=== Statistics ===
==== Players ====
Player	Team	GP	G	A	+/–	PIM	Pts

==== Goaltenders ====
Player	Team	GP	TOI	SOG	GA	SO	GAA	SV%

== Transactions ==
Acquired
Player	Former team	Contract length	Ref
Josh MacNevin	Växjö Lakers HC	1 year	
Patric Blomdahl	Frölunda HC	2 years	
Johan Andersson	Almtuna IS	1 year	
Daniel Rudslätt	Kölner Haie	2 years	
Oscar Steen	Modo Hockey	1 year	
Viktor Fasth	Växjö Lakers HC	1 year	
Peter Nolander	Brynäs IF	1 year	
Johannes Salmonsson	Rögle BK	1 year	
Kent McDonell	Färjestads BK	1 year	
Rastislav Pavlikovský	Örebro HK	Until end of season	
Vesa Toskala	Calgary Flames	1 month	
Björn Bjurling (loan)	Brynäs IF	1 month	
Fredrik Svensson	Ilves	Until end of season	

Contract extensions
Player	Contract length	Ref
Daniel Bång	1 year	
Christian Sandberg	1 year	
Victor Ahlström	1 year	
Oscar Ahlström	1 year	
Stefan Johansson	1 year	
Mikael Österberg	1 year	
Fredrik Carlsson	1 year	
Jonas Liwing	1 year	
Christopher Heino-Lindberg	1 year	
Tobias Ericsson	1 year	
Mattias Beck	1 year	
Richard Gynge	1 year	
David Engblom	1 year	
Dick Tärnström	2 years	

Leaving AIK
Player	New team	Refs
Fredrik Holmgren	?	
Jonatan Bjurö	Malmö Redhawks	
Jonas Westerling	Almtuna IS	
Per Savilahti-Nagander	SaiPa	
Johan Ryno	IK Oskarshamn	
Henrik Eriksson	?	
Andreas Jungbeck	Almtuna IS	
Lucas Lawson	?	
Patrik Bergström	Rögle BK	
Fredric Korduner	?	

== Final roster ==
No.	Nat	Player	Pos	S/G	Age	Acquired	Birthplace
86	(Sweden)	Oscar Ahlström	RW	L	39	2009	Farsta, Sweden
68	(Sweden)	Victor Ahlström	LW	L	39	2009	Farsta, Sweden
24	(Sweden)	Johan Andersson	C	L	38	2010	Nynäshamn, Sweden
22	(Sweden)	Mattias Beck (A)	LW	L	43	2006	Täby, Sweden
31	(Sweden)	Björn Bjurling	G	L	46	2010	Stockholm, Sweden
84	(Sweden)	Patric Blomdahl	W	L	42	2010	Stockholm, Sweden
20	(Sweden)	Daniel Bång	W	L	38	2006	Kista, Sweden
17	(Sweden)	Fredrik Carlsson	D	L	37	2006	Täby, Sweden
33	(Sweden)	David Engblom (A)	LW	L	48	1995	Solna, Sweden
19	(Sweden)	Tobias Ericsson	W	L	38	2006	Stockholm, Sweden
30	(Sweden)	Viktor Fasth	G	L	43	2010	Kalix, Sweden
10	(Sweden)	Richard Gynge	RW	R	39	2009	Tyresö, Sweden
40	(Sweden)	Christopher Heino-Lindberg	G	R	41	2008	Helsingborg, Sweden
37	(Sweden)	Stefan Johansson	D	L	38	2008	Piteå, Sweden
23	(Sweden)	Jonas Liwing	D	R	43	2008	Stockholm, Sweden
35	(Sweden)	Niklas Lundström	G	L	33	2009	Värmdö, Sweden
44	(Canada)	Josh MacNevin	D	R	48	2010	Calgary, Alberta
18	(Canada)	Kent McDonell	RW	R	47	2010	Williamstown, Ontario
12	(Sweden)	Patrik Nemeth	D	L	34	2009	Stockholm, Sweden
27	(Sweden)	Henrik Nilsson	D	R	34	2009	Stockholm, Sweden
70	(Sweden)	Peter Nolander	D	L	45	2010	Karlstad, Sweden
13	(Sweden)	Joakim Nordström	C	L	34	2009	Tyresö, Sweden
7	(Sweden)	Filip Olsson	D	L	35	2008	Stockholm, Sweden
15	(Slovakia)	Rastislav Pavlikovský	C	L	49	2010	Dubnica nad Váhom, Slovakia
14	(Sweden)	Daniel Rudslätt	LW	L	51	2010	Huddinge, Sweden
25	(Sweden)	Johannes Salmonsson	W	L	40	2010	Uppsala, Sweden
21	(Sweden)	Christian Sandberg	C	R	38	2005	Järfälla, Sweden
45	(Sweden)	Oscar Steen	C	L	43	2010	Stockholm, Sweden
4	(Sweden)	Fredrik Svensson	D	L	50	2010	Stockholm, Sweden
6	(Sweden)	Dick Tärnström (C)	D	L	51	2008	Stockholm, Sweden
22	(Slovakia)	Richard Zedník	W	L	50	2011	Banská Bystrica, Czechoslovakia
4	(Sweden)	Mikael Österberg	D	L	40	2005	Tyresö, Sweden

== Awards ==
- Honken Trophy: Viktor Fasth
- Golden Puck: Viktor Fasth
- Årets coach (Coach of the year): Roger Melin
