= Niklas Lundström =

Swedish ice hockey player

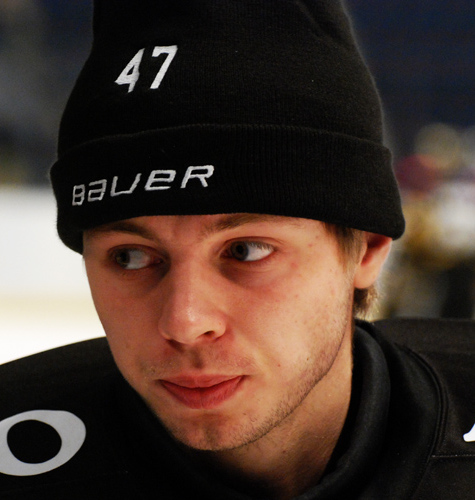
- Ice hockey goalie Niklas Lundström of AIK Ishockey.
- Born: 10 January 1993 (age 33) Värmdö, Sweden
- Height: 6 ft 2 in (188 cm)
- Weight: 190 lb (86 kg; 13 st 8 lb)
- Position: Goaltender
- Catches: Left
- Metal team Former teams: Odense Bulldogs; AIK; Chicago Wolves; Bakersfield Condors; Hvidovre Fighters; Linköping HC; Graz99ers; IK Oskarshamn
- NHL draft: 132nd overall, 2011; St. Louis Blues
- Playing career: 2010–present

Medal record

Representing Sweden

Ice hockey

IIHF World U18 Championship
Silver medal – second place	2011 Germany	

World Junior Championships
Silver medal – second place	2013 Russia	

Niklas Lundström (born 10 January 1993) is a Swedish professional ice hockey goaltender currently playing for Odense Bulldogs in the Metal Ligaen (DEN). Lundström made his professional debut in Sweden with AIK IF of the Swedish Hockey League (SHL). Lundström has also played in Sweden's national junior ice hockey team, both the under-16 and under-17 respective teams.

== Playing career ==
Lundström played his first Elitserien game on 28 December 2010, which was against HV71. He replaced Björn Bjurling in the net after Bjurling had allowed three goals in the game's first 13 minutes. However, AIK lost the game 8–2.

Lundström was drafted by the St. Louis Blues in the 5th round of the 2011 NHL entry draft as the 132nd pick overall.

In the midst of his second season within the Blues organization in 2015–16, Lundström was traded by St. Louis along with a 5th round selection in 2016 to the Edmonton Oilers in exchange for Anders Nilsson on 27 February 2016.

Unable to establish a career in North America, Lundström returned to Sweden as a free agent and signed a one-year deal with second tier club, IF Björklöven of the HockeyAllsvenskan on 29 April 2016.
