= Engblom =

Engblom is a surname. Notable people with the surname include:

- Annicka Engblom (born 1967), Swedish politician
- Brian Engblom (born 1955), Canadian ice hockey player and broadcaster
- David Engblom (born 1977), Swedish ice hockey player
- Pontus Engblom (born 1991), Swedish footballer
- Skip Engblom (born 1948), American entrepreneur

== See also ==
- Engblom v. Carey, United States Court of Appeals for the Second Circuit case
