= Filip Windlert =

Swedish ice hockey player

- Born: January 24, 1993 (age 32) Bålsta, Sweden
- Height: 6 ft 0 in (183 cm)
- Weight: 205 lb (93 kg; 14 st 9 lb)
- Position: Defence
- Shoots: Left
- Allsv team Former teams: AIK; HC TPS
- Playing career: 2011–present

Filip Windlert (born January 24, 1993) is a Swedish professional ice hockey defenceman. He made his Elitserien debut playing with AIK during the 2011–12 Elitserien season.
