= Peter Nolander =

Swedish ice hockey player (born 1981)

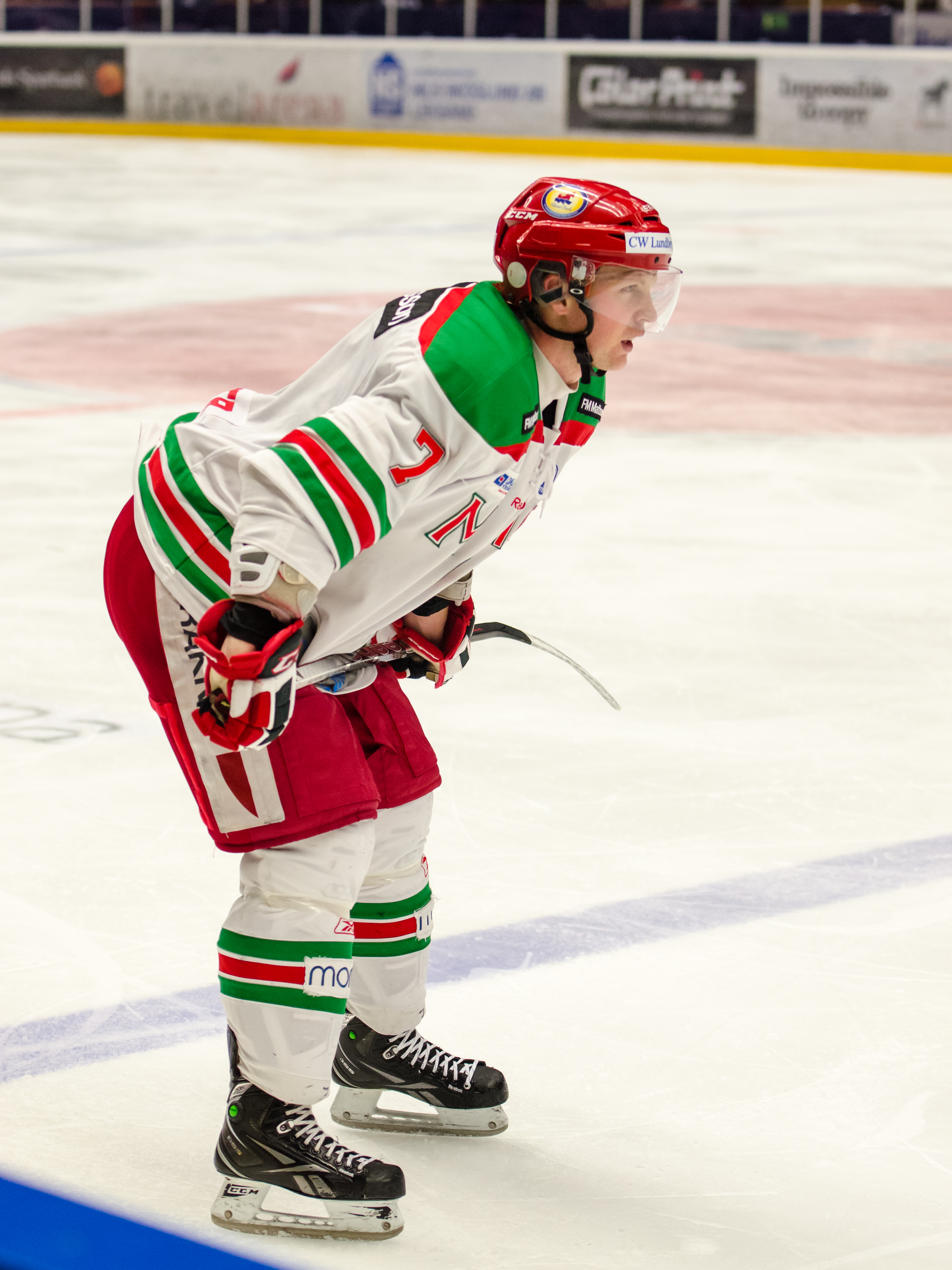
- Born: 29 January 1981 (age 44); Karlstad, Sweden
- Height: 5 ft 9 in (175 cm)
- Weight: 198 lb (90 kg; 14 st 2 lb)
- Position: Defence
- Shot: Left
- Swe-2 team Former teams: Mora IK; Brynäs IF; AIK
- Playing career: 1996–2015

Peter Nolander (born 29 January 1981 in Karlstad) is a Swedish ice hockey defenceman, who playsed for Mora IK of the HockeyAllsvenskan. Nolander has also played in Elitserien teams Brynäs IF and AIK. His youth team is Arvika HC.

== Career statistics ==
			Regular season					Playoffs
Season	Team	League	GP	G	A	Pts	PIM	GP	G	A	Pts	PIM
1996–97	Arvika HC	Division 2	10	0	2	2	—	—	—	—	—	—
1997–98	Arvika HC	Division 2	19	3	1	4	—	—	—	—	—	—
1998–99	Arvika HC	Division 2	23	2	3	5	—	—	—	—	—	—
1999–00	Arvika HC	Division 1	—	—	—	—	—	—	—	—	—	—
2000–01	Arvika HC	Division 1	—	—	—	—	—	—	—	—	—	—
2001–02	Mora IK	HockeyAllsvenskan	43	1	8	9	12	3	1	1	2	0
2002–03	Mora IK	HockeyAllsvenskan	41	11	5	16	12	—	—	—	—	—
2003–04	Mora IK	HockeyAllsvenskan	46	8	11	19	6	10	2	2	4	4
2004–05	Mora IK	Elitserien	48	2	8	10	22	—	—	—	—	—
2005–06	Mora IK	Elitserien	43	1	1	2	14	5	0	0	0	0
2006–07	Brynäs IF	Elitserien	52	7	10	17	38	7	1	0	1	6
2007–08	Brynäs IF	Elitserien	51	4	9	13	28	—	—	—	—	—
2008–09	Brynäs IF	Elitserien	53	5	8	13	32	4	0	0	0	2
2009–10	Brynäs IF	Elitserien	47	3	11	14	28	5	1	0	1	0
2010–11	AIK IF	Elitserien	52	4	3	7	18	8	0	2	2	2
2011–12	Mora IK	HockeyAllsvenskan	47	3	3	6	28	—	—	—	—	—
2012–13	Mora IK	HockeyAllsvenskan	50	4	7	11	24	—	—	—	—	—
2013–14	Södertälje SK	HockeyAllsvenskan	23	1	3	4	8	—	—	—	—	—
2014–15	Södertälje SK	HockeyAllsvenskan	26	1	2	3	18	8	0	1	1	4
Elitserien totals			346	26	50	76	180	29	2	2	4	10
HockeyAllsvenskan totals			276	29	39	68	108	21	3	4	7	8
