= Christopher Bengtsson =

Swedish ice hockey player

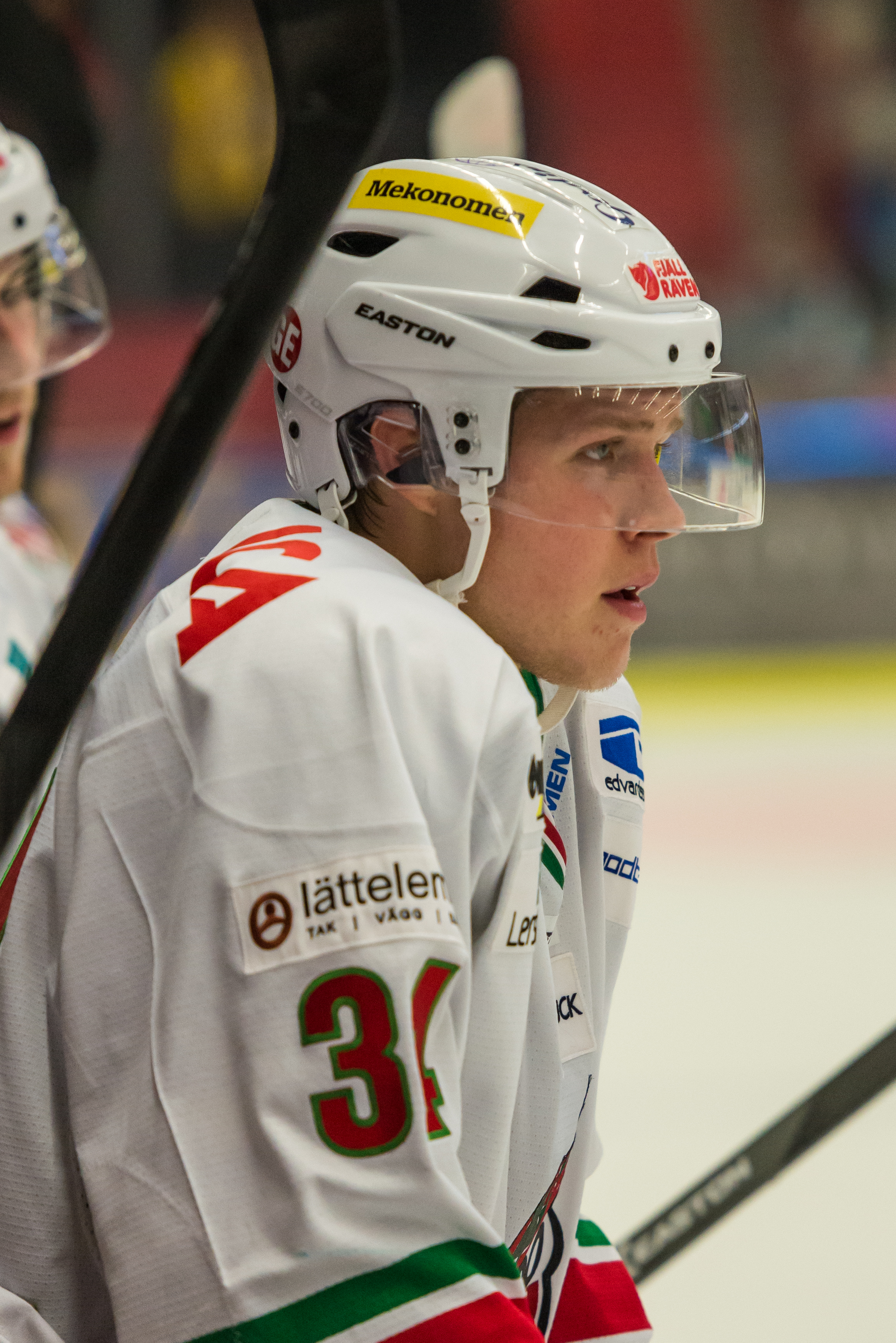
- Christopher Bengtsson 2013
- Born: October 19, 1993 (age 31) Stockholm, Sweden
- Height: 5 ft 11 in (180 cm)
- Weight: 187 lb (85 kg; 13 st 5 lb)
- Position: Centre
- Shoots: Left
- Allsv team Former teams: AIK; Modo Hockey; KalPa; Rögle BK; Färjestad BK; Vålerenga Ishockey; HPK
- Playing career: 2012–present

Christopher Bengtsson (born October 19, 1993) is a Swedish professional ice hockey player who currently plays for AIK of the HockeyAllsvenskan (Allsv).

== Playing career ==
Bengtsson previously played for Färjestad BK at the under-20 level and for Huddinge IK at the under-18 and under-20 level. In 2012 Bengtsson signed with MoDo Hockey and split the season between the J20 SuperElit and the Swedish Hockey League.

On November 21, 2013, MoDo signed Bengtsson to a two-year contract extension, keeping him with the team initially until the end of the 2015–16 SHL season.

== Career statistics ==
			Regular season					Playoffs
Season	Team	League	GP	G	A	Pts	PIM	GP	G	A	Pts	PIM
2009–10	Huddinge IK	J18	22	7	16	23	8	—	—	—	—	—
2009–10	Huddinge IK	J20	1	0	0	0	0	—	—	—	—	—
2010–11	Huddinge IK	J18	1	0	1	1	0	—	—	—	—	—
2010–11	Huddinge IK	J20	39	8	13	21	38	—	—	—	—	—
2011–12	Färjestad BK	J20	49	17	23	40	36	6	2	1	3	4
2012–13	Modo Hockey	J20	42	11	19	30	30	6	2	5	7	0
2012–13	Modo Hockey	SEL	7	1	0	1	4	3	0	1	1	0
2013–14	Modo Hockey	J20	5	2	3	5	2	—	—	—	—	—
2013–14	Modo Hockey	SHL	43	4	2	6	12	1	0	0	0	0
2013–14	Södertälje SK	Allsv	9	0	4	4	0	—	—	—	—	—
2014–15	Modo Hockey	SHL	13	0	0	0	6	—	—	—	—	—
2014–15	AIK	Allsv	31	3	3	6	6	—	—	—	—	—
2015–16	KalPa	Liiga	59	3	7	10	16	3	0	0	0	0
2016–17	Tingsryds AIF	Allsv	33	7	9	16	16	5	1	0	1	2
2017–18	Södertälje SK	Allsv	49	21	20	41	12	5	2	5	7	2
2018–19	Rögle BK	SHL	29	4	2	6	6	—	—	—	—	—
2018–19	Färjestad BK	SHL	15	0	3	3	0	9	0	0	0	12
2019–20	Södertälje SK	Allsv	40	13	13	26	38	1	0	1	1	0
2020–21	Södertälje SK	Allsv	27	13	10	23	4	4	1	2	3	0
2021–22	IF Björklöven	Allsv	52	22	15	37	8	18	1	3	4	2
2022–23	IF Björklöven	Allsv	43	9	17	26	8	5	0	0	0	0
2023–24	Vålerenga	NOR	45	17	27	44	12	17	4	10	14	4
2024–25	HPK	Liiga	52	10	11	21	22	3	0	0	0	2
SHL totals			107	9	7	16	28	13	0	1	1	12
Liiga totals			111	13	18	31	38	6	0	0	0	2
