= 2011 IIHF World Championship final =

Ice hockey match

	1	2	3	Total
Sweden	0	1	0	1
Finland	0	1	5	6
- Date: 15 May 2011
- Arena: Orange Arena
- City: Bratislava
- Attendance: 9,166

The 2011 IIHF World Championship final was played at the Orange Arena in Bratislava, Slovakia on 15 May between Sweden and Finland. Finland won the match 6–1 and became world champions for the first time since the 1995 tournament, and for the second time in history. This match was Finland's first final since 2007 and Sweden's first final since 2006.

== Background ==
Finland and Sweden met in the IIHF World Championships final last time in the 1998 tournament in Switzerland. The two-game format final resulted in Sweden's victory 0–1, 0–0.

As two highly ranked neighboring countries, Sweden and Finland have a long-running competitive tradition in ice hockey. Before the game, mainstream media in both countries titled the match "a dream final".

== Road to the final ==
Sweden
Round
Finland

Team	GP	W	OTW	OTL	L	GF	GA	DIF	PTS
Sweden	3	2	0	1	0	13	7	+6	7
United States	3	2	0	0	1	11	9	+2	6
Norway	3	1	1	0	1	12	8	+4	5
Austria	3	0	0	0	3	1	13	−12	0

First Round

Team	GP	W	OTW	OTL	L	GF	GA	DIF	PTS
Czech Republic	3	3	0	0	0	12	3	+9	9
Finland	3	1	1	0	1	9	5	+4	5
Denmark	3	0	1	0	2	4	13	−9	2
Latvia	3	0	0	2	1	6	10	−4	2

Team	GP	W	OTW	OTL	L	GF	GA	DIF	PTS
Canada	5	3	2	0	0	23	11	+12	13
Sweden	5	3	0	1	1	18	10	+8	10
Norway	5	2	1	0	2	17	15	+2	8
United States	5	2	0	1	2	15	19	−4	7
Switzerland	5	1	1	1	2	11	12	−1	6
France	5	0	0	1	4	5	22	−17	1

Second Round

Team	GP	W	OTW	OTL	L	GF	GA	DIF	PTS
Czech Republic	5	5	0	0	0	19	7	+12	15
Finland	5	2	2	0	1	16	10	+6	10
Germany	5	2	0	2	1	15	17	−2	8
Russia	5	2	0	1	2	12	14	−2	7
Slovakia	5	1	0	0	4	13	14	−1	3
Denmark	5	0	1	0	4	9	22	−13	2

Opponent
Result
Playoff Round
Opponent
Result
Germany
5–2
Quarterfinals
Norway
4–1
Czech Republic
5–2
Semifinals
Russia
3–0

== The match ==
=== Summary ===
The first period was goal-less, with good scoring chances at both ends. Sweden's Oliver Ekman-Larsson took a penalty at 17:52 for interference, but Finland did not manage to score in Viktor Fasth's goal. In the second period at 4:41, Sweden's Marcus Krüger took a penalty for slashing, but the Swedes were again successful in killing the penalty. After only a minute of five-on-five play, Sweden's Magnus Pääjärvi fired a fierce shot towards Petri Vehanen's net and scored the match's first goal at 27:40 for a 1–0 lead to Sweden.

Two Finnish penalties followed, at 29:15 to Niko Kapanen for hooking, and at 34:25 to Petteri Nokelainen for boarding, but the Swedes did not manage to increase their lead despite a close call.

Towards the second period's end, at 39:30, Sweden's David Petrasek took a penalty for hooking Finland's Mikael Granlund near the Swedish goal. With only 7 seconds remaining of the second period, Finland's Jarkko Immonen did not miss a pass from Janne Pesonen to score a power play goal to Fasth's net, tying the game to 1–1.

The opening goal for Finland seemed to unleash the team's momentum, as the third period had not reached its third minute before Petteri Nokelainen scored for Finland to give them a 1–2 lead from Antti Pihlström's pass at 42:35. Less than a minute later, at 43:21, Niko Kapanen widened the Finns' lead to 1–3 from a pass by Juhamatti Aaltonen.

Before the period's half, the Swedes tried to regroup through a time-out, but the puck dominance remained with the Finns. Janne Pesonen's 1–4 goal at 56:41 and Mika Pyörälä's 1–5 at 57:16 sealed the game for Finland. With 55 seconds remaining in the game clock, Antti Pihlström scored the match's last goal from a pass by Jani Lajunen, ending the final in a decisive 1–6 victory for the Finnish team.

=== Details ===
15 May 2011; 20:30	Sweden	1–6 (0–0, 1–1, 0–5)	Finland	Orange Arena, Bratislava; Attendance: 9,166

Game reference

Viktor Fasth
Goalies
Petri Vehanen
Referees:
(Canada) Darcy Burchell
(Switzerland) Brent Reiber

M. Pääjärvi-Svensson – 27:40	1–0
	1–1	J. Immonen (J. Pesonen, M. Koivu) (PP) – 39:53
	1–2	P. Nokelainen (A. Pihlström) – 42:35
	1–3	N. Kapanen (J. Aaltonen, L. Komarov) – 43:21
	1–4	J. Pesonen (M. Granlund) – 56:41
	1–5	M. Pyörälä (M. Koivu, A. Salmela) – 57:16
	1–6	A. Pihlström (J. Lajunen) – 59:05

8 min
Penalties
4 min
33
Shots
32

== Reactions ==
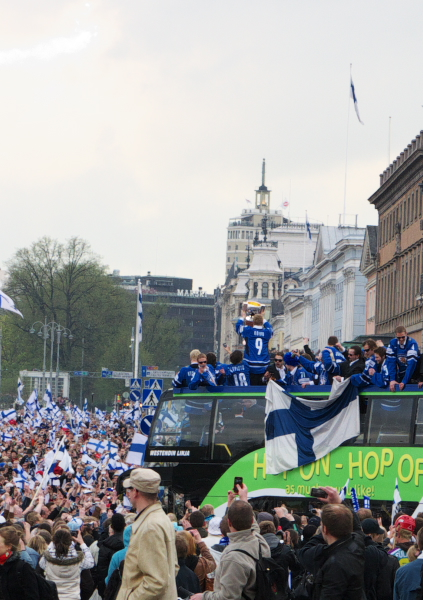
The Finnish team arrives at Market Square.

In Finland, the victory was celebrated at the Market Square in Helsinki on 16 May. The police estimated that 90,000–100,000 people were present as the Finnish team took the stage. President Tarja Halonen was among the guests.
