= Mattias Beck =

Swedish professional ice hockey player

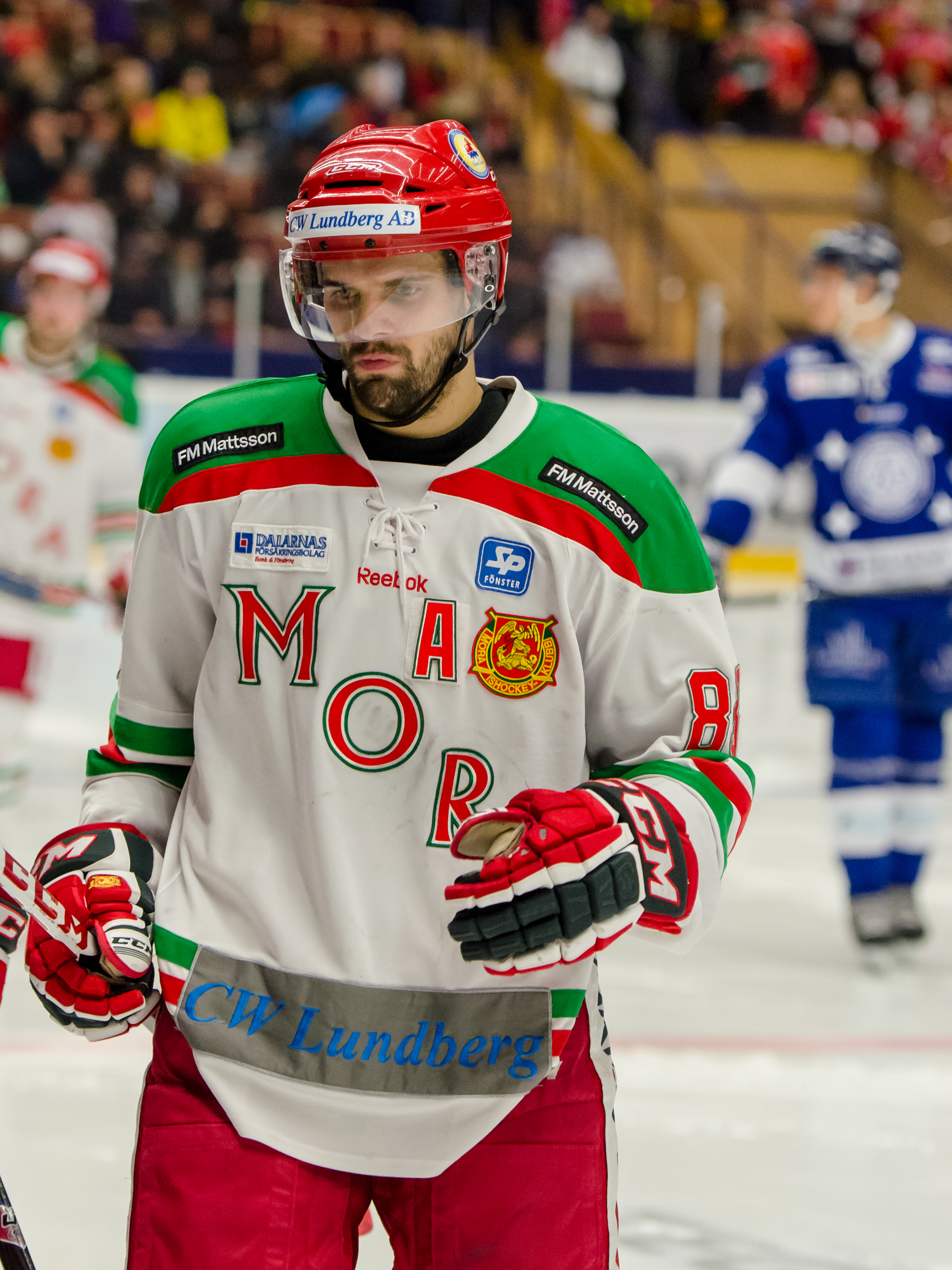
- Born: 21 January 1983 (age 43) Täby, Sweden
- Height: 5 ft 10 in (178 cm)
- Weight: 179 lb (81 kg; 12 st 11 lb)
- Position: Left wing
- Shoots: Left
- DEL2 team Former teams: SC Riessersee; AIK IF; HV71
- Playing career: 2002–present

Mattias Beck (born 21 January 1983 in Täby) is a Swedish professional ice hockey player (left wing), currently playing with SC Riessersee in the DEL2.

Beck played youth hockey with Viggbyholms IK before he played 11 games in AIK of the Elitserien (SEL) in the 2010–11 season. He later played four seasons with Mora IK of the HockeyAllsvenskan (Allsv).

On July 7, 2015, Beck left Sweden for the first time in his professional career, agreeing to a one-year deal with German club SC Riessersee of the DEL2.

== Career statistics ==
=== Regular season and playoffs ===
			Regular season					Playoffs
Season	Team	League	GP	G	A	Pts	PIM	GP	G	A	Pts	PIM
1999–00	AIK	J20	3	0	0	0	0	—	—	—	—	—
2000–01	AIK	J20	18	5	10	15	12	5	2	1	3	2
2001–02	AIK	J20	31	27	19	46	60	4	4	5	9	8
2001–02	AIK	SEL	2	0	0	0	0	—	—	—	—	—
2001–02	Örebro HK	Allsv	10	6	5	11	6	—	—	—	—	—
2002–03	AIK	Allsv	42	15	17	32	32	7	0	3	3	4
2003–04	AIK	Allsv	40	13	14	27	22	9	0	2	2	27
2004–05	IK Oskarshamn	Allsv	44	13	16	29	55	4	2	1	3	2
2005–06	IK Oskarshamn	Allsv	31	5	13	18	26	—	—	—	—	—
2005–06	HV71	SEL	8	0	0	0	0	10	0	0	0	0
2006–07	AIK	Allsv	45	14	16	30	59	—	—	—	—	—
2007–08	AIK	Allsv	44	19	20	39	52	—	—	—	—	—
2008–09	AIK	Allsv	44	18	11	29	30	10	1	2	3	4
2009–10	AIK	Allsv	51	8	18	26	22	10	1	1	2	0
2010–11	AIK	SEL	11	2	1	3	2	—	—	—	—	—
2010–11	Mora IK	Allsv	41	14	12	26	10	10	1	3	4	2
2011–12	Mora IK	Allsv	51	7	17	24	12	—	—	—	—	—
2012–13	Mora IK	Allsv	52	12	24	36	26	—	—	—	—	—
2013–14	Mora IK	Allsv	52	19	19	38	16	6	1	4	5	4
2014–15	Södertälje SK	Allsv	51	14	17	31	14	—	—	—	—	—
SHL totals			21	1	2	3	2	10	0	0	0	0

=== International ===
Year	Team	Event	Result	GP	G	A	Pts	PIM
2001	Sweden	WJC18	7th	6	3	0	3	0
2003	Sweden	WJC	8th	6	0	3	3	0
Junior totals				12	3	3	6	0
