= Träningsserien =

The Träningsserien was the top level ice hockey league in Sweden in the 1922 season. The league was won by AIK Ishockey. It was replaced by the Klass I for 1923.

== 1922 season ==
=== Final table ===
	Club	GP	W	T	L	GF–GA	Pts
1	AIK Ishockey	6	5	1	0	17:6	11
2	Nacka SK	6	4	1	1	24:14	9
3	IK Göta B	5	3	0	2	29:19	6
4	Hammarby IF	6	2	1	3	21:24	5
5	IFK Stockholm	6	2	0	4	17:19	4
6	IF Linnéa	6	1	1	4	16:32	2
7	Järva IS	5	1	0	4	10:20	2
