= Mika Pyörälä =

Finnish ice hockey player

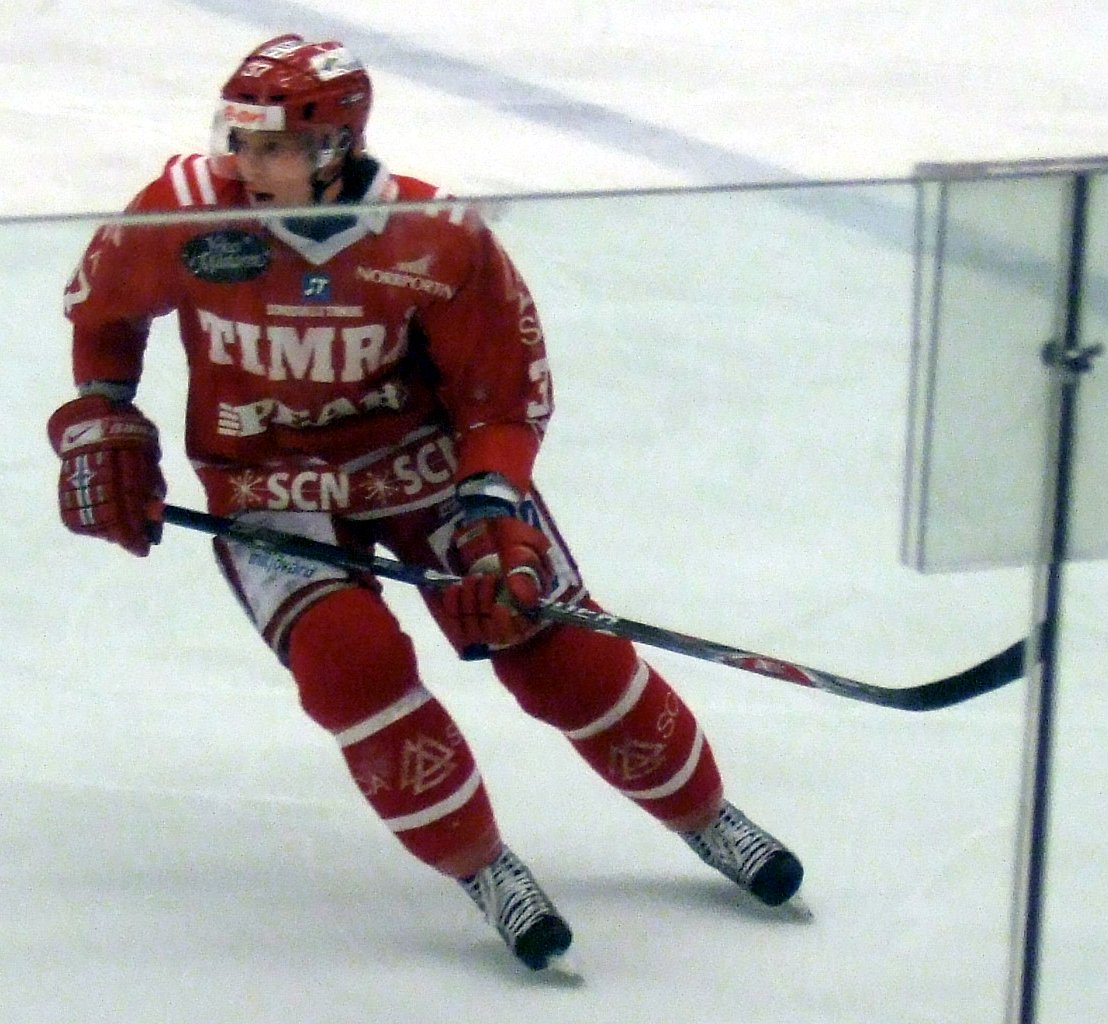
- Born: 13 July 1981 (age 45) Oulu, Finland
- Height: 6 ft 0 in (183 cm)
- Weight: 179 lb (81 kg; 12 st 11 lb)
- Position: Centre
- Shoots: Left
- NL team Former teams: SC Bern; Timrå IK; Philadelphia Flyers; Frölunda HC; Amur Khabarovsk; Luleå HF
- National team: Finland
- NHL draft: Undrafted
- Playing career: 2001–present

Mika Pyörälä (born 13 July 1981) is a Finnish former professional ice hockey forward. He played for the Philadelphia Flyers of the National Hockey League (NHL), Timrå IK and Frölunda HC of the Swedish Elitserien, and Amur Khabarovsk of the Russian Kontinental Hockey League. Pyörälä played his entire career in Finnish Liiga in Oulun Kärpät.

== Playing career ==
Mika Pyörälä
Medal record

Representing Finland

Ice hockey

World Championships
Gold medal – first place	2011 Slovakia	
Silver medal – second place	2016 Russia	
Silver medal – second place	2007 Moscow	
Bronze medal – third place	2008 Canada	

On 14 July 2009, Pyörälä signed a one-year contract with the Philadelphia Flyers. After splitting the 2009–10 season between the Flyers and the AHL's Adirondack Phantoms, Pyörälä returned to Europe, signing a three-year contract with Frölunda HC on 29 July 2010.

Pyörälä represented Finland in the 2011 World Championship. He scored a goal in the final against Sweden as Finland took the gold medal.

== Career statistics ==
=== Regular season and playoffs ===
			Regular season					Playoffs
Season	Team	League	GP	G	A	Pts	PIM	GP	G	A	Pts	PIM
1997–98	Kärpät	FIN U18	27	2	4	6	4	—	—	—	—	—
1998–99	Kärpät	FIN U18	36	10	18	28	12	—	—	—	—	—
1999–2000	Kärpät	FIN U20	40	6	10	16	18	—	—	—	—	—
2000–01	Kärpät	FIN U20	40	21	35	56	52	2	0	0	0	0
2000–01	Kärpät	SM-l	5	0	0	0	0	9	1	0	1	2
2001–02	Kärpät	SM-l	51	4	2	6	35	4	0	1	1	2
2001–02	Kärpät	FIN U20	—	—	—	—	—	1	0	2	2	0
2002–03	Kärpät	SM-l	56	17	11	28	22	15	2	3	5	6
2003–04	Kärpät	SM-l	53	12	19	31	8	13	0	1	1	0
2004–05	Kärpät	SM-l	56	9	13	22	18	11	3	1	4	4
2005–06	Kärpät	SM-l	41	13	8	21	10	11	5	6	11	0
2006–07	Kärpät	SM-l	56	28	17	45	30	10	4	2	6	2
2007–08	Timrå IK	SEL	46	17	16	33	18	11	6	4	10	0
2008–09	Timrå IK	SEL	55	21	22	43	10	7	2	1	3	6
2009–10	Philadelphia Flyers	NHL	36	2	2	4	10	—	—	—	—	—
2009–10	Adirondack Phantoms	AHL	35	8	10	18	10	—	—	—	—	—
2010–11	Frölunda HC	SEL	47	14	9	23	8	—	—	—	—	—
2011–12	Frölunda HC	SEL	53	22	18	40	12	6	1	2	3	2
2012–13	Amur Khabarovsk	KHL	25	5	5	10	4	—	—	—	—	—
2012–13	Luleå HF	SEL	32	5	12	17	6	13	1	2	3	8
2013–14	Kärpät	SM-l	60	13	23	36	16	16	6	10	16	4
2014–15	Kärpät	Liiga	57	15	18	33	28	19	8	6	14	4
2015–16	Kärpät	Liiga	49	15	17	32	12	14	5	7	12	12
2016–17	Kärpät	Liiga	60	26	29	55	20	2	0	1	1	0
2017–18	SC Bern	NL	32	4	5	9	16	3	0	1	1	0
2018–19	Kärpät	Liiga	45	16	16	32	14	—	—	—	—	—
2019–20	Kärpät	Liiga	51	20	25	45	18	—	—	—	—	—
2020–21	Kärpät	Liiga	56	12	22	34	32	5	1	3	4	2
2021–22	Kärpät	Liiga	53	16	12	28	14	7	1	1	2	4
Liiga totals			749	216	232	448	277	136	36	42	78	42
SEL totals			234	79	77	156	54	37	10	9	19	16
NHL totals			36	2	2	4	10	—	—	—	—	—

=== International ===
Year	Team	Event	GP	G	A	Pts	PIM
2007	Finland	WC	8	0	1	1	2
2008	Finland	WC	9	0	0	0	0
2009	Finland	WC	6	1	1	2	0
2011	Finland	WC	9	1	2	3	4
2012	Finland	WC	9	1	1	2	2
2016	Finland	WC	10	1	3	4	0
2017	Finland	WC	10	0	2	2	6
2018	Finland	OG	5	1	0	1	0
Senior totals			66	5	10	15	14
