= Viktor Fasth =

Swedish ice hockey player (born 1982)

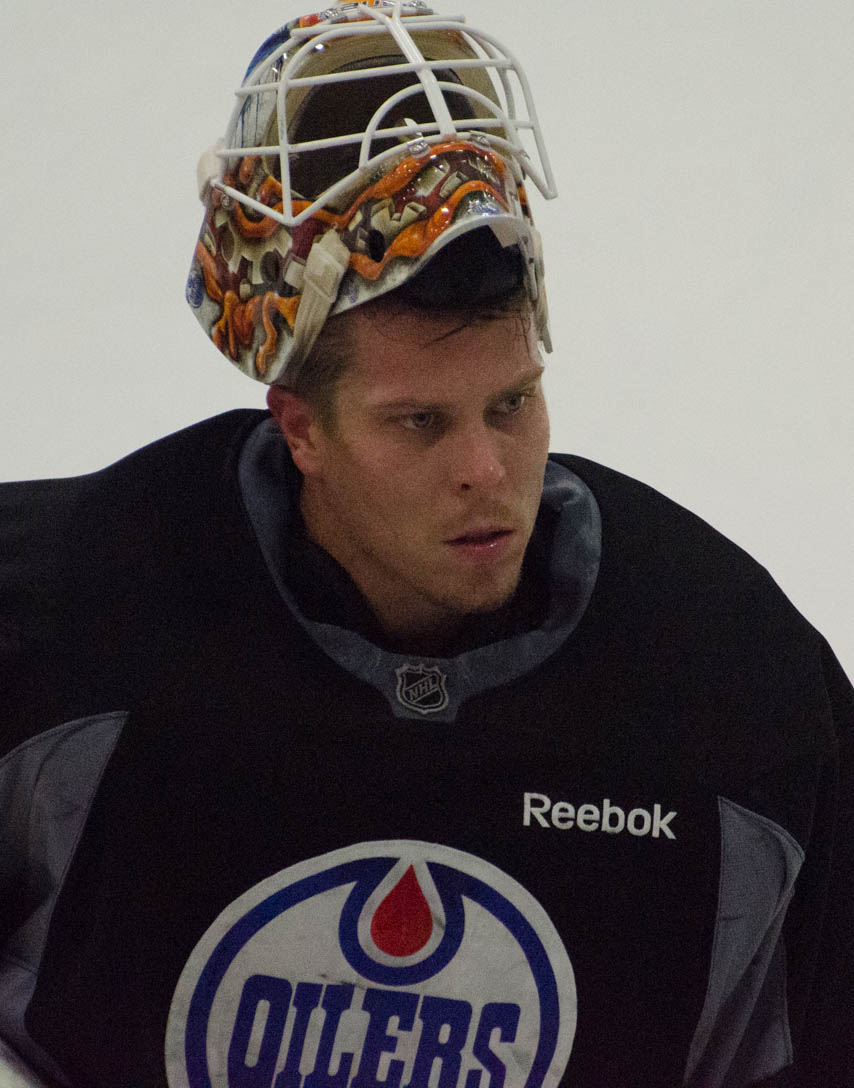
- Fasth with the Edmonton Oilers in 2014
- Born: 8 August 1982 (age 44) Kalix, Sweden
- Height: 6 ft 0 in (183 cm)
- Weight: 192 lb (87 kg; 13 st 10 lb)
- Position: Goaltender
- Caught: Left
- Played for: AIK; Anaheim Ducks; Edmonton Oilers; CSKA Moscow; Växjö Lakers
- National team: Sweden
- NHL draft: Undrafted
- Playing career: 2007–2021

Erik Sixten Viktor Fasth (born 8 August 1982) is a Swedish former professional ice hockey goaltender who last played for the Växjö Lakers of the Swedish Hockey League (SHL). Fasth had his international breakthrough during the 2010–11 season, after signing with Stockholm team AIK in the SHL.

== Playing career ==
=== Division 2 to HockeyAllsvenskan ===
Viktor Fasth was born in Kalix, but grew up in Vänersborg. As an 18-year-old goaltender, Fasth played with the Brooklyn Tigers (a youth affiliate connected to Luleå HF) in the Swedish Division 2, the fourth-tier league. The following season he played with Vänersborgs HC in the third-tier league Division 1. The following season, in 2002–03, he turned to Tvåstad Cobras HC to return to Division 2. Tvåstad became promoted to Division 1 that season, and Fasth continued to play for them in the 2003–04 season. However, the Tvåstad Cobras HC team was shut down after the 2003–04 season due to financial problems, and Fasth therefore moved to play in Tingsryds AIF in Division 1 for three seasons. In his 2006–07 season with Tingsryd he was the third best goaltender in Division 1F, with a 92.47% save percentage in 33 games. His biggest success with the team came in that season, when he helped the team reach the Kvalserien qualification for HockeyAllsvenskan for the first time since their relegation to Division 1 in the 2002–03 season. However, the team finished fourth in the qualification and thus remained in Division 1.

Fasth then signed with Växjö Lakers Hockey in the 2007–08 season, at that time in the second-tier league HockeyAllsvenskan, and played there for three seasons. He played well in all of these seasons, placing, in save percentage, second in the 2007–08 season and first in the 2009–10 season.

=== Elitserien ===
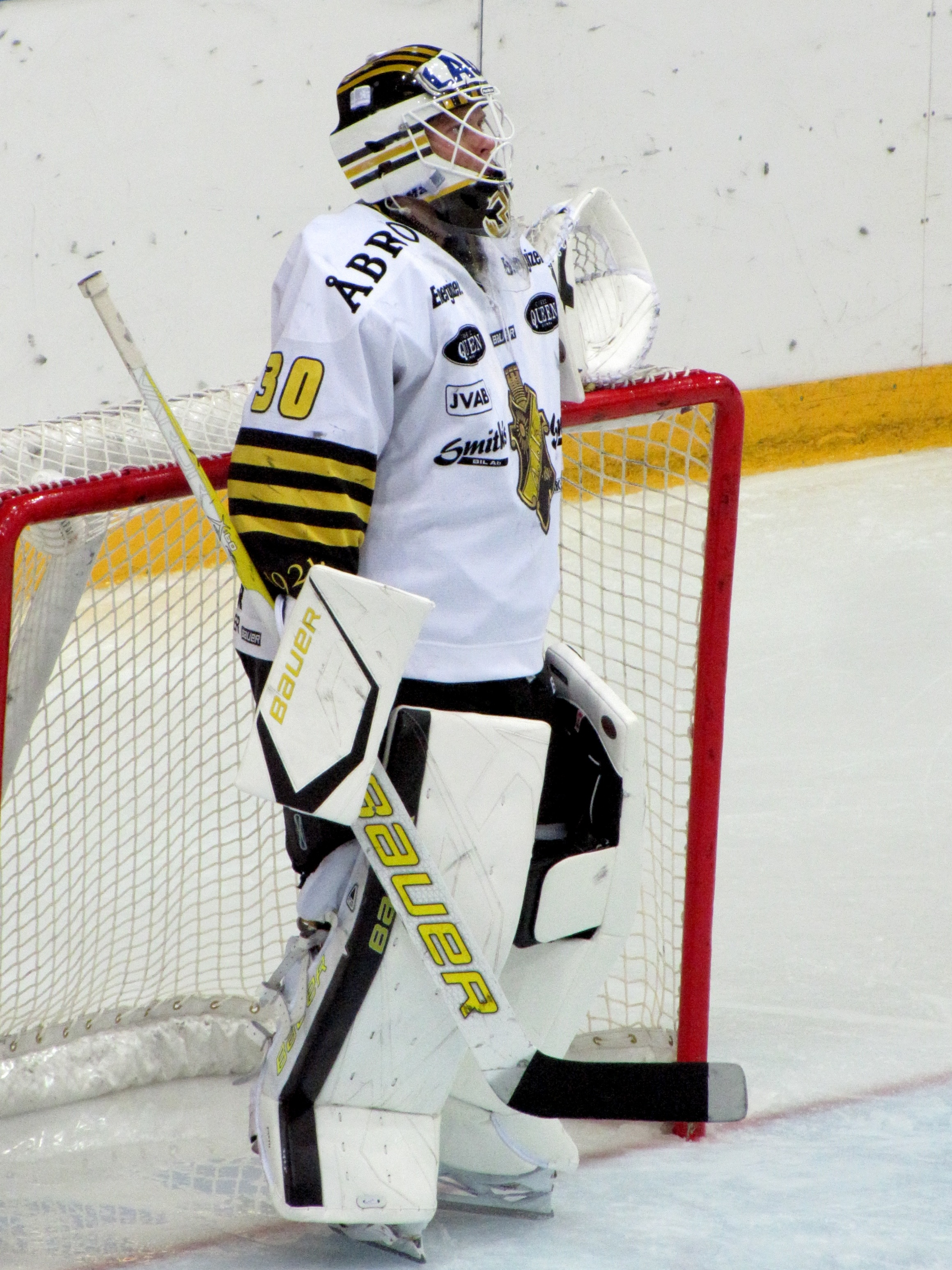
Viktor Fasth with AIK

After a successful 2009–10 season, which ended with play in the Kvalserien qualification for Sweden's top-tier league Elitserien (SHL), he signed a one-year contract with Elitserien newcomers AIK to make his debut season in Elitserien, the top ice hockey league in Sweden. He was set to be the team's backup goaltender, but injury problems for Christopher Heino-Lindberg forced AIK to start Viktor Fasth. Playing in 42 games, he posted an impressive 92.45% save percentage and placed third in the leading goaltenders league for save percentage. He significantly contributed to AIK's success that season, reaching the semifinals in the playoffs, where they were eliminated by Färjestad BK in four games. Viktor Fasth received both the Honken Trophy award and the Guldpucken (Golden Puck) award. In February 2011, Fasth extended his contract with the team by 2 years, which meant the contract was expected to expire after the 2012–13 season.

Fasth continued to impress in the 2011–12 season. Once again he finished third in save percentage at 93.14% and he was subsequently awarded the Honken Trophy for the second year in a row. In the playoffs, he continued to shut the door, and he and AIK managed to repeat the 2010–11 success, advancing to the semifinals, where they once again were eliminated, this time in seven games against Skellefteå AIK.

=== National Hockey League ===
On 21 May 2012, Fasth signed a 1-year, one-way $1 million USD deal with the Anaheim Ducks of the National Hockey League (NHL).

On 20 September 2012, due to the ongoing 2012–13 NHL lockout, Fasth signed to play with his former team Tingsryds AIF of the HockeyAllsvenskan (Swe-2). Fasth played in 12 games for the team, registering an impressive 94.17% save percentage and a 1.68 goals against average (GAA).

In his NHL debut on 26 January 2013, Fasth led the Ducks to a 3–2 shootout victory over the Nashville Predators. Fasth stopped 19 of the 21 shots sent his way, and prevented the Predators from finding the net in the shootout with Martin Erat hitting the crossbar, Fasth stopping Mike Fisher's shot, and then swatting the puck out of the air from David Legwand. Corey Perry scored the game-winning goal for the Ducks in the shootout. Fasth found early success in the NHL, starting the season 8–0–0 – the best start by a goaltender in the regular season as a starter since Ray Emery of the Ottawa Senators won his first nine games between the end of 2002–03 and the beginning of the 2003–04 season. Fasth eventually ended the streak in his ninth start on 25 February 2013, with a 2–5 loss against the Los Angeles Kings on the road, also ending a six-game winning streak for the Ducks. With the loss, Fasth failed to match Ray Emery's streak. Fasth further helped the Ducks advance to an 11–2–1 record, their best start since their Stanley Cup-winning 2006–07 season. Fasth finished the regular season with a 15–6–2 record; the Ducks finished with a 30–12–6 record and qualified for the 2013 Stanley Cup playoffs. The Ducks were eliminated in the Conference Quarterfinals by the Detroit Red Wings in seven games, with Fasth not playing in any of these games as the backup to Jonas Hiller.

The following year, Fasth was injured early in the season. On 4 March 2014, Fasth was traded by the Ducks to the Edmonton Oilers in exchange for a fifth and a third round pick in the 2014 and 2015 NHL entry draft, respectively. This gave him the chance to compete for the number one job against goalie Ben Scrivens.

=== Kontinental Hockey League ===
On 9 July 2015, Fasth agreed to terms on an initial one-year contract with CSKA Moscow of the Kontinental Hockey League (KHL). Fasth provided an immediate stability to CSKA and was extended for a further season. Over his two seasons in the KHL with CSKA, Fasth won 28 of his 41 games.

=== Return to Sweden ===
As a free agent following the 2016–17 season, Fasth opted to return to his homeland and agreed to a second stint with Växjö Lakers, who were promoted to the SHL in his absence from leaving the club in 2010. He signed a three-year contract on 1 May 2017.

== International play ==
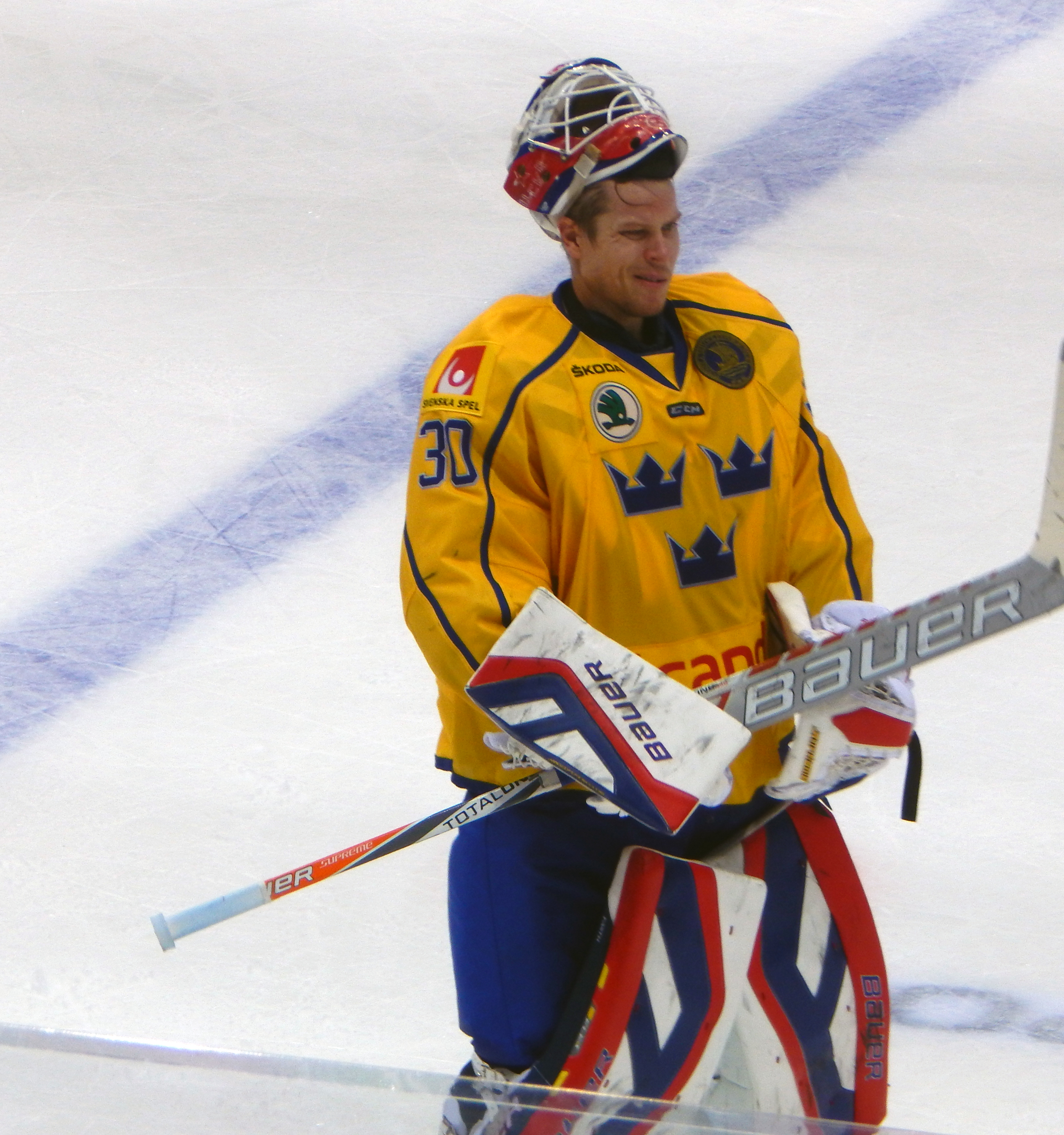

Medal record

Representing Sweden

Ice hockey

World Championships
Gold medal – first place	2017 Germany/France	
Silver medal – second place	2011 Slovakia	

After goaltender Stefan Liv declined playing for Sweden in the 2011 World Championship, Fasth was given a chance to play for the Swedish national team. Fasth made his debut for Sweden on 6 April 2011, in an exhibition game against Germany. In the World Championship tournament he helped Sweden reach the final and led the leading goaltenders league until the gold medal game against Finland. However, Sweden lost the final and Fasth allowed 6 goals out of 32 shots in that game, and Fasth therefore landed second in the leading goaltenders league, with a 94.57% save percentage in 7 games and three shutouts, as well as a 1.71 GAA. Despite the loss, Fasth was named the tournament's MVP (most valuable player) and best goaltender. He was also selected to the tournament's All-Star Team.

At the 2012 World Championship, Fasth was once again the starting goaltender for the Swedish national team. However, Sweden was eliminated in the quarterfinal against the Czech Republic. In 6 games, Fasth recorded a 90.21% save percentage and a 2.34 GAA; he placed 11th in the save percentage rankings.

== Personal life ==
Fasth is the son of Kenteric Fasth, a former goaltender who played for IFK Vänersborg in the then third-tier Division 2. Fasth lives with his wife Linda Bäcktorp. Linda gave birth to a daughter in July 2011.

== Career statistics ==
=== Regular season and playoffs ===
			Regular season									Playoffs
Season	Team	League	GP	W	L	T/OT	MIN	GA	SO	GAA	SV%	GP	W	L	MIN	GA	SO	GAA	SV%
2007–08	Växjö Lakers	Allsv	30	18	10	1	1681	63	2	2.25	.926	3	1	2	178	11	0	3.72	.876
2008–09	Växjö Lakers	Allsv	9	7	2	0	553	28	1	3.04	.921	—	—	—	—	—	—	—	—
2009–10	Växjö Lakers	Allsv	23	16	5	0	1311	47	4	2.15	.930	—	—	—	—	—	—	—	—
2010–11	AIK	SEL	42	20	15	7	2473	93	2	2.26	.924	8	4	4	472	14	1	1.78	.945
2011–12	AIK	SEL	46	19	17	8	2683	95	5	2.12	.931	12	7	5	752	35	1	2.79	.921
2012–13	Tingsryds AIF	Allsv	12	4	7	0	677	19	1	1.68	.942	—	—	—	—	—	—	—	—
2012–13	Anaheim Ducks	NHL	25	15	6	2	1428	52	4	2.18	.921	—	—	—	—	—	—	—	—
2012–13	Norfolk Admirals	AHL	3	1	2	0	183	6	0	1.96	.914	—	—	—	—	—	—	—	—
2013–14	Anaheim Ducks	NHL	5	2	2	1	305	15	0	2.95	.885	—	—	—	—	—	—	—	—
2013–14	Norfolk Admirals	AHL	5	3	2	0	275	11	0	2.40	.922	—	—	—	—	—	—	—	—
2013–14	Edmonton Oilers	NHL	7	3	3	1	396	18	0	2.73	.914	—	—	—	—	—	—	—	—
2014–15	Edmonton Oilers	NHL	26	6	15	3	1336	76	0	3.41	.888	—	—	—	—	—	—	—	—
2015–16	CSKA Moscow	KHL	20	13	4	1	1122	31	3	1.66	.921	—	—	—	—	—	—	—	—
2016–17	CSKA Moscow	KHL	21	15	2	2	1169	33	4	1.69	.929	4	1	2	179	8	0	2.68	.899
2017–18	Växjö Lakers	SHL	33	21	6	5	1937	65	6	2.01	.918	9	7	1	503	12	3	1.43	.934
2018–19	Växjö Lakers	SHL	35	16	15	3	2082	69	4	1.99	.918	4	2	2	249	11	0	2.65	.892
2019–20	Växjö Lakers	SHL	24	11	12	0	1311	55	1	2.52	.907	—	—	—	—	—	—	—	—
2020–21	Växjö Lakers	SHL	31	22	9	0	1877	56	5	1.79	.933	5	4	0	288	10	1	2.08	.926
NHL totals			63	26	26	7	3466	161	4	2.79	.904	—	—	—	—	—	—	—	—

=== International ===
Year	Team	Event	Result	GP	W	L	OT	MIN	GA	SO	GAA	SV%
2011	Sweden	WC	2nd place, silver medalist(s)	7	6	1	0	420	12	3	1.71	.946
2012	Sweden	WC	6th	6	4	2	0	360	14	2	2.34	.902
2016	Sweden	WC	6th	2	2	0	0	120	5	0	2.50	.902
2017	Sweden	WC	1st place, gold medalist(s)	4	2	2	0	244	9	0	2.21	.906
2018	Sweden	OG	5th	3	2	1	0	182	5	1	1.65	.918
2021	Sweden	WC	9th	2	1	1	0	118	5	0	2.54	.861
Senior totals				24	17	7	0	1,344	50	6	2.16	.906

== Awards and honours ==
Award	Year
IIHF
MVP	2011
Best Goaltender	2011
All-Star Team	2011
SHL
Le Mat Trophy (Växjö Lakers)	2018, 2021
Honken Trophy	2018, 2021

Awards and achievements
Preceded by Jacob Markström	Winner of the Honken Trophy; 2011, 2012	Succeeded by Gustaf Wesslau
Preceded by Magnus Johansson	Winner of the Guldpucken; 2011	Succeeded by Jakob Silfverberg
