= Petteri Nokelainen =

Finnish ice hockey player (born 1986)

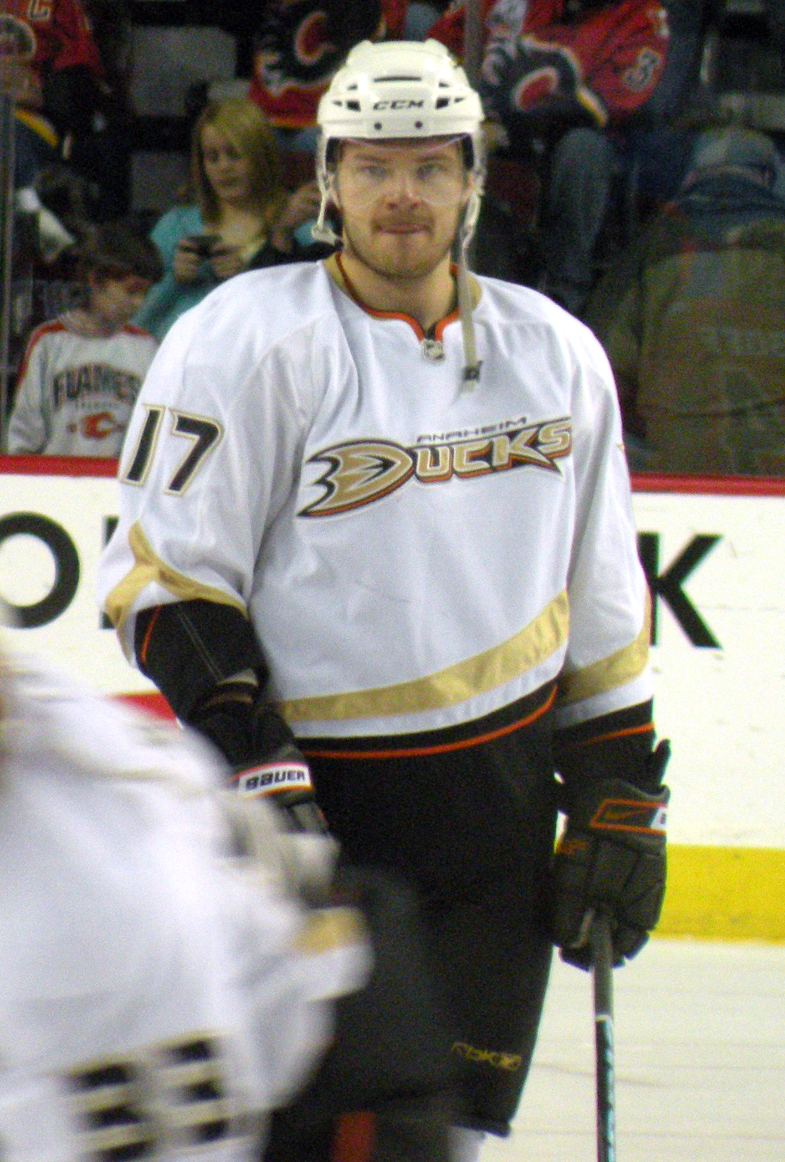
- Born: January 16, 1986 (age 40) Imatra, Finland
- Height: 6 ft 1 in (185 cm)
- Weight: 191 lb (87 kg; 13 st 9 lb)
- Position: Centre
- Shot: Right
- Played for: SaiPa; New York Islanders; Boston Bruins; Anaheim Ducks; Phoenix Coyotes; Jokerit; Montreal Canadiens; Brynäs IF; Torpedo Nizhny Novgorod
- National team: Finland
- NHL draft: 16th overall, 2004; New York Islanders
- Playing career: 2003–2016

Petteri Antti Nokelainen (born January 16, 1986) is a Finnish former professional ice hockey forward who played over 200 games in the National Hockey League (NHL). He concluded his professional career in returning to his original club, SaiPa of the Finnish Liiga.

== Playing career ==
Nokelainen was drafted by the New York Islanders as their first-round pick, 16th overall, in the 2004 NHL entry draft. He played in the SM-Liiga for SaiPa in his native Finland, before going to North America in 2005 to play for the New York Islanders. Prior to Saipa, he played in Imatran Ketterä.

Twelve games into the 2005–06 NHL season with the Islanders, during which he scored a goal and an assist, Petteri suffered a severe knee injury. Many thought that this injury would sideline him for the rest of the year, but the knee healed without surgery and Nokelainen returned to finish the rest of the season with the Islanders. His knee still required surgery, which he had performed after the season.

On September 11, 2007, Nokelainen was traded to Boston for Ben Walter and a conditional second-round draft pick. On March 4, 2009, Nokelainen was traded by the Bruins to the Anaheim Ducks for Steve Montador.

On March 3, 2010, Nokelainen was traded to the Phoenix Coyotes in exchange for a sixth-round pick in the 2011 NHL entry draft. Helping the Coyotes qualify for the playoffs for the first time in 7 seasons, Petteri went scoreless in five postseason games against the Detroit Red Wings. On July 1, 2010, Nokelainen was bought out from the remaining year of his contract by the Coyotes, releasing him as a free agent. Later that summer, Nokelainen signed a two-year contract with Jokerit of the SM-liiga. Nokelainen's season ended with a trophy, as Finland won the 2011 IIHF World Championship in Slovakia with Nokelainen scoring the game-winning goal in the final against Sweden.

After one season with Jokerit, Nokelainen returned to the Phoenix Coyotes, signing a one-year contract on May 20, 2011.

On October 23, 2011, the Montreal Canadiens acquired Nokelainen and defenceman Garrett Stafford from the Phoenix Coyotes in exchange for forward Brock Trotter and a seventh-round pick in the 2012 NHL entry draft.

On August 16, 2013, Nokelainen returned to Europe as a free agent and signed a one-year contract with Swedish club, Brynäs IF of the Swedish Hockey League (SHL).

== Career statistics ==
=== Regular season and playoffs ===
			Regular season					Playoffs
Season	Team	League	GP	G	A	Pts	PIM	GP	G	A	Pts	PIM
2002–03	SaiPa	FIN U18	10	3	8	11	18	—	—	—	—	—
2002–03	SaiPa	FIN U20	28	7	4	11	28	3	1	0	1	4
2002–03	SaiPa	SM-l	2	1	0	1	2	—	—	—	—	—
2003–04	SaiPa	FIN U20	10	5	3	8	4	4	0	1	1	0
2003–04	SaiPa	SM-l	40	4	4	8	16	—	—	—	—	—
2004–05	SaiPa	SM-l	52	15	5	20	34	—	—	—	—	—
2005–06	New York Islanders	NHL	15	1	1	2	4	—	—	—	—	—
2006–07	Bridgeport Sound Tigers	AHL	60	6	10	16	51	—	—	—	—	—
2007–08	Providence Bruins	AHL	8	3	5	8	4	6	4	1	5	0
2007–08	Boston Bruins	NHL	57	7	3	10	19	7	0	2	2	4
2008–09	Boston Bruins	NHL	33	0	3	3	10	—	—	—	—	—
2008–09	Anaheim Ducks	NHL	17	4	2	6	6	9	0	0	0	2
2009–10	Anaheim Ducks	NHL	50	4	7	11	21	—	—	—	—	—
2009–10	Phoenix Coyotes	NHL	17	1	1	2	6	5	0	0	0	2
2010–11	Jokerit	SM-l	46	11	16	27	116	7	2	0	2	12
2011–12	Phoenix Coyotes	NHL	5	0	1	1	0	—	—	—	—	—
2011–12	Montreal Canadiens	NHL	51	3	3	6	37	—	—	—	—	—
2012–13	Hamilton Bulldogs	AHL	17	2	2	4	21	—	—	—	—	—
2013–14	Brynäs IF	SHL	19	4	3	7	12	5	0	3	3	2
2014–15	Torpedo Nizhny Novgorod	KHL	26	7	3	10	32	—	—	—	—	—
2015–16	SaiPa	Liiga	10	4	4	8	6	—	—	—	—	—
SM-l/Liiga totals			150	35	29	64	174	7	2	0	2	12
NHL totals			245	20	21	41	103	21	0	2	2	8

=== International ===
Medal record

Representing Finland

Ice hockey

World Championships
Gold medal – first place	2011 Slovakia	

World Junior Championships
Bronze medal – third place	2004 Finland	

Year	Team	Event	Result	GP	G	A	Pts	PIM
2003	Finland	WJC18	7th	6	1	0	1	6
2004	Finland	WJC	3rd place, bronze medalist(s)	7	1	0	1	0
2004	Finland	WJC18	7th	6	5	6	11	16
2005	Finland	WJC	5th	6	1	4	5	2
2011	Finland	WC	1st place, gold medalist(s)	9	1	1	2	8
Junior totals				25	8	10	18	24
Senior totals				9	1	1	2	8

Awards and achievements
Preceded by Robert Nilsson	New York Islanders first round pick 2004	Succeeded by Ryan O'Marra
