= Mikael Österberg =

Swedish ice hockey player

- Born: March 14, 1986 (age 40) Tyresö, Stockholm County
- Height: 5 ft 11 in (180 cm)
- Weight: 179 lb (81 kg; 12 st 11 lb)
- Position: Defenceman
- Shot: Left
- No team Former teams: Unknown; AIK
- National team: Sweden
- Playing career: 2005–2011

Mikael Österberg (born March 14, 1986 in Tyresö, Stockholm County) is a Swedish professional ice hockey defenceman. He played 4 games in AIK of the Elitserien (SEL) in the 2010–11 season.

== Career statistics ==
			Regular season					Playoffs
Season	Team	League	GP	G	A	Pts	PIM	GP	G	A	Pts	PIM
2002–03	AIK IF J18	J18 Allsvenskan	9	0	3	3	16	—	—	—	—	—
2004–05	AIK IF J20	J20 SuperElit	30	0	0	0	69	—	—	—	—	—
2005–06	AIK IF J20	J20 SuperElit	24	2	5	7	60	—	—	—	—	—
2005–06	AIK IF	HockeyAllsvenskan	29	0	5	5	16	—	—	—	—	—
2006–07	AIK IF J20	J20 SuperElit	5	1	2	3	12	—	—	—	—	—
2006–07	AIK IF	HockeyAllsvenskan	41	2	2	4	49	—	—	—	—	—
2007–08	AIK IF J20	J20 SuperElit	7	1	2	3	8	—	—	—	—	—
2007–08	AIK IF	HockeyAllsvenskan	43	2	3	5	91	—	—	—	—	—
2008–09	AIK IF	HockeyAllsvenskan	42	0	4	4	103	9	1	1	2	4
2009–10	AIK IF	HockeyAllsvenskan	50	3	7	10	69	10	0	1	1	8
2010–11	AIK IF	Elitserien	4	0	1	1	2	—	—	—	—	—
2010–11	Almtuna IS	HockeyAllsvenskan	18	0	0	0	20	—	—	—	—	—
Elitserien totals			4	0	1	1	2	—	—	—	—	—
HockeyAllsvenskan totals			223	7	21	28	348	19	1	2	3	12
