= Björn Bjurling =

Swedish ice hockey player

- Born: 21 August 1979 (age 47) Stockholm, Sweden
- Height: 6 ft 0 in (183 cm)
- Weight: 205 lb (93 kg; 14 st 9 lb)
- Position: Goaltender
- Caught: Left
- Played for: Södertälje SK; Djurgårdens IF; AIK
- NHL draft: 274th overall, 2004; Edmonton Oilers
- Playing career: 2004–2011

Björn Bjurling (born 21 August 1979 in Stockholm, Sweden) is a Swedish professional ice hockey goaltender, currently without a contract. He was drafted in the ninth round of the 2004 NHL entry draft, 274th overall, by the Edmonton Oilers.
