= David Engblom =

Swedish ice hockey player (born 1977)

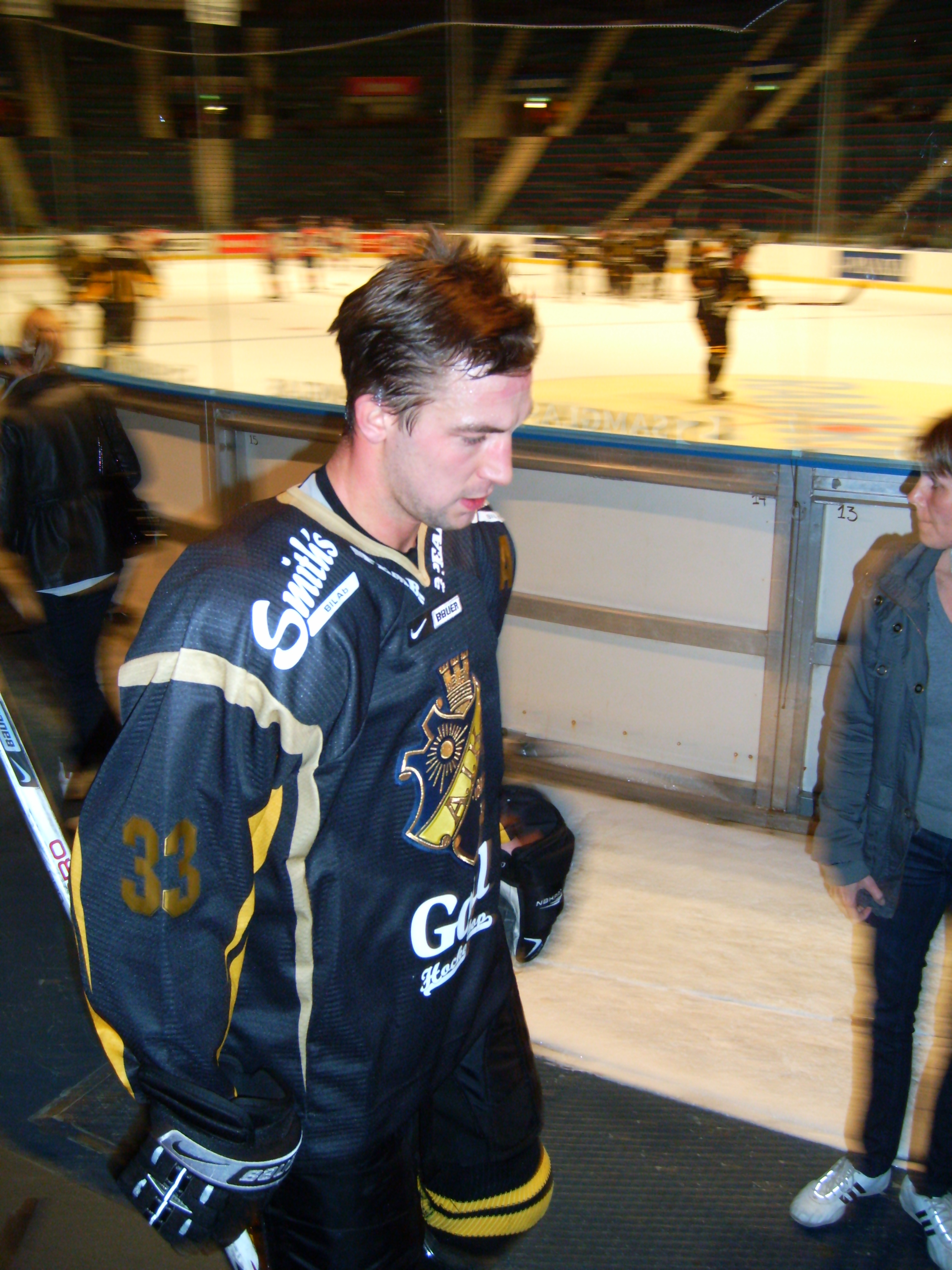
- Born: June 2, 1977 (age 49) Solna, Sweden
- Height: 6 ft 2 in (188 cm)
- Weight: 207 lb (94 kg; 14 st 11 lb)
- Position: Left wing
- Shot: Left
- Played for: Vallentuna BK; AIK; Hammarby IF; Skellefteå AIK
- National team: Sweden
- NHL draft: 234th overall, 1995; Detroit Red Wings
- Playing career: 1995–2011

David Engblom (born June 2, 1977) is a Swedish former professional ice hockey player (left wing). Engblom's youth team is Vallentuna BK. From the 1995–96 season to his retirement in 2011, he played in AIK, except for the 2000–01 season, when Engblom played in Skellefteå AIK of the (now named) HockeyAllsvenskan. Engblom was one of the alternate captains in AIK. After being denied an extended contract with AIK after the 2010–11 season, Engblom retired, but instead continues to work for AIK as a materials manager.

== Career statistics ==
=== Regular season and playoffs ===
			Regular season					Playoffs
Season	Team	League	GP	G	A	Pts	PIM	GP	G	A	Pts	PIM
1993–94	IF Vallentuna BK	SWE.2	27	0	0	0	2	—	—	—	—	—
1994–95	IF Vallentuna BK	SWE.2	32	1	4	5	12	6	1	2	3	2
1995–96	IF Vallentuna BK	SWE.2	6	3	0	3	6	—	—	—	—	—
1995–96	AIK	SEL	39	0	4	4	4	—	—	—	—	—
1996–97	AIK	J20	20	18	14	32	—	—	—	—	—	—
1996–97	AIK	SEL	39	3	1	4	10	—	—	—	—	—
1997–98	AIK	SEL	44	4	2	6	24	—	—	—	—	—
1998–99	AIK	SEL	49	5	3	8	8	—	—	—	—	—
1999–2000	AIK	J20	1	0	0	0	0	—	—	—	—	—
1999–2000	Hammarby IF (loan)	Allsv	6	0	1	1	6	—	—	—	—	—
2000–01	Skellefteå AIK	Allsv	39	8	8	16	12	2	0	0	0	0
2001–02	AIK	SEL	48	4	2	6	14	—	—	—	—	—
2002–03	AIK	Allsv	42	8	13	21	38	10	4	1	5	6
2003–04	AIK	Allsv	44	14	9	23	32	9	0	2	2	6
2004–05	AIK	SWE.3	27	12	23	35	55	9	2	7	9	0
2005–06	AIK	J20	1	0	1	1	0	—	—	—	—	—
2005–06	AIK	Allsv	41	9	18	27	32	—	—	—	—	—
2006–07	AIK	Allsv	37	5	11	16	64	—	—	—	—	—
2007–08	AIK	Allsv	44	2	10	12	52	—	—	—	—	—
2008–09	AIK	Allsv	39	4	6	10	20	10	1	0	1	4
2009–10	AIK	Allsv	39	5	5	10	22	10	1	3	4	6
2010–11	AIK	SEL	53	4	8	12	22	8	0	2	2	6
SWE.2/Allsv totals			396	59	85	144	298	47	7	8	15	24
SEL totals			309	20	22	42	106	8	0	2	2	6

=== International ===
Year	Team	Event	GP	G	A	Pts	PIM
1997	Sweden	WJC	6	0	0	0	8
Junior totals			6	0	0	0	8
