= Christopher Heino-Lindberg =

Swedish ice hockey player

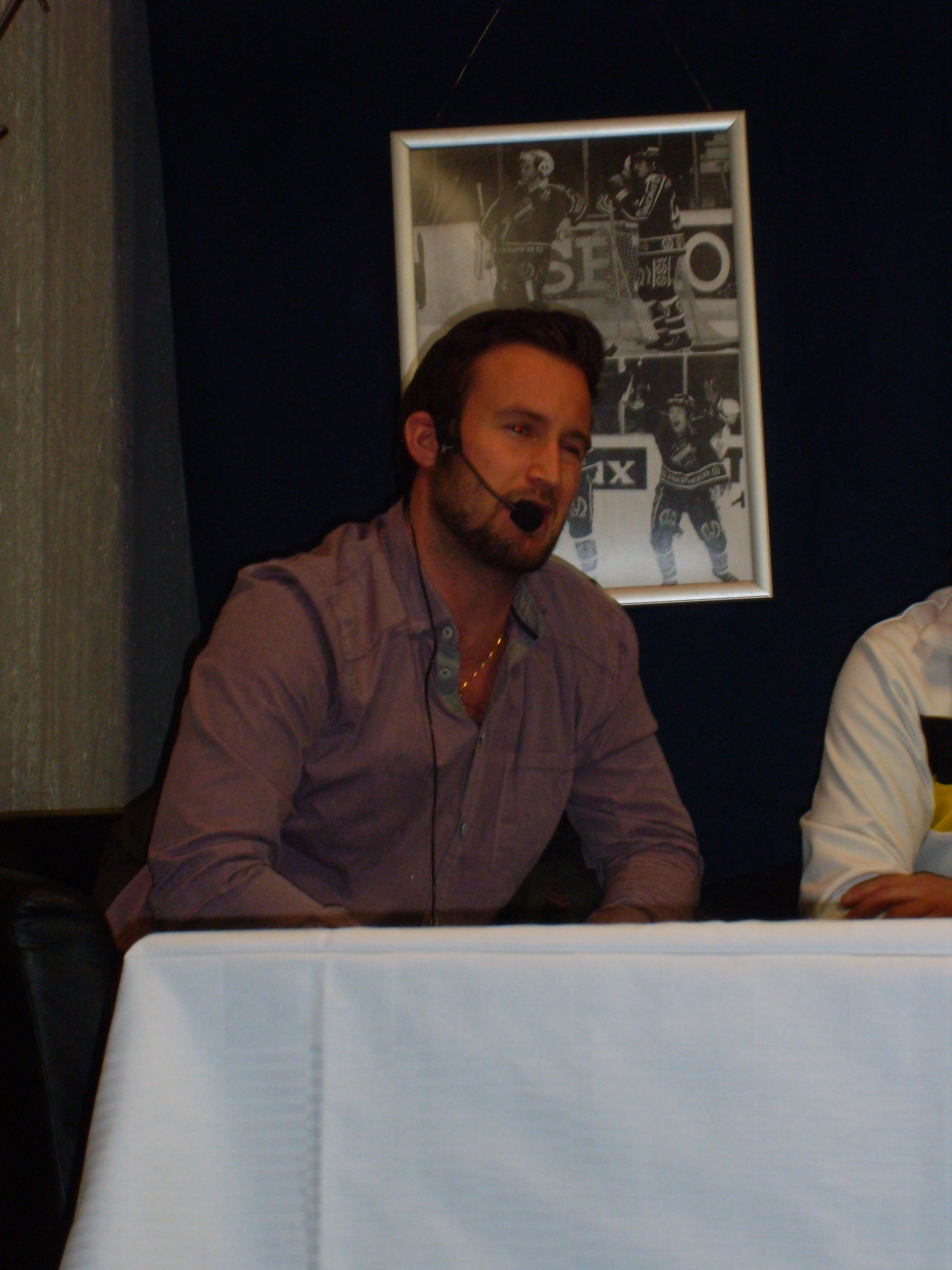
- Christopher Heino-Lindberg in February 2011
- Born: 29 January 1985 (age 41) Helsingborg, Sweden
- Height: 6 ft 0 in (183 cm)
- Weight: 190 lb (86 kg; 13 st 8 lb)
- Position: Goaltender
- Caught: Right
- Played for: Färjestads BK; AIK
- NHL draft: 177th overall, 2003; Montreal Canadiens
- Playing career: 2005–2011

Kalle Christopher Jonathan Heino-Lindberg (born 29 January 1985) is a Swedish former professional ice hockey goaltender. In Elitserien, Heino-Lindberg has played in Färjestads BK and AIK.

He has played for the Swedish team during the Junior World Championships.

In his first season with Färjestads BK, 2005–06, he and the team won the Swedish Championship. Heino-Lindberg was drafted in the 2003 NHL entry draft by the Montreal Canadiens, in the 6th round as 177th pick overall.

Heino-Lindberg is now working as a hockey expert on several media platforms, including the web-TV program hockeymorgon. He has also recently been a guest on SVT and hockeysverige.se.

Heino-Lindberg has also performed in the musicals Sound of Music and Mio min Mio, and played the role of Matti in the television series Eva och Adam. He was a member of the rap duo Chris & Gino, and in the 2010s he started his career as a country musician under the name Chris Lindberg.

== Career statistics ==
=== Regular season ===
Season	Team	League	GP	GPI	W	L	T	MIN	GA	SO	GAA	SVS%
2001–02	Hammarby IF	Allsvenskan	2	0	0	0	0	0	0	0	0.00	0.00
2002–03	Hammarby IF	Allsvenskan	11	1				60	2	0	2.00	93.75
2003–04	IF Vallentuna BK	Allsvenskan	32	23				1158	92	0	4.77	89.58
2003–04	Hammarby IF	SuperAllsvenskan	7	1				17	1	0	3.73	85.71
2004–05	Hammarby IF	Allsvenskan	41	41				2476	89	3	2.16	91.85
2005–06	Nybro Vikings IF	HockeyAllsvenskan	5	5				299	19	0	3.82	91.32
2005–06	Färjestads BK	Elitserien	50	7				384	16	1	2.51	90.36
2006–07	Färjestads BK	Elitserien	50	18				1056	41	0	2.33	91.63
2007–08	Färjestads BK	Elitserien	39	29				1710	76	1	2.67	91.02
2008-09	AIK	HockeyAllsvenskan	34	28				1642	50	4	1.83	93.29
2009-10	AIK	HockeyAllsvenskan	41	35				2088	71	5	2.04	93.03
Elitserien Totals			139	54				3148	133	2	NA	NA

=== Playoffs ===
Season	Team	League	GP	GPI	W	L	T	MIN	GA	SO	GAA	SVS%
2005–06	Färjestads BK	Elitserien	18	1				20	2	0	6.00	66.67
2006–07	Färjestads BK	Elitserien	9	2				118	5	0	2.54	90.57
2007–08	Färjestads BK	Elitserien	5	5				199	10	0	3.02	91.53
Elitserien Totals			32	8				337	17	0	NA	NA

=== Qualification ===
Season	Team	League	GP	GPI	W	L	T	MIN	GA	SO	GAA	SVS%
2003–04	Hammarby IF	Kvalserien	8	2				90	7	0	4.69	82.50
2008-09	AIK	Kvalserien	9	9				506	22	1	2,61	90.52
2009-10	AIK	Kvalserien	6	4				207	12	1	3,46	88.79
Kvalserien Totals			23	15				803	41	2	NA	NA

== Personal life ==
Heino-Lindberg is of Finnish descent through his father who is actor Kalle Heino. Heino-Lindberg's maternal aunt is singer Christina Lindberg, and his paternal grandfather Reino Heino was a competitive weightlifter at the international level.
