= AIK IF =

Ice hockey club in Solna, Sweden

AIK
- Nickname: Gnaget
- City: Stockholm, Sweden
- League: HockeyAllsvenskan
- Founded: 1921 (1891)
- Home arena: Hovet and Avicii Arena
- Colors
- General manager: Lars Johansson
- Head coach: Fredrik Hallberg
- Captain: Filip Windlert
- Website: aikhockey.se

Franchise history
- 1921–1923, 1925–present: AIK

Championships
- Le Mat Trophy: (1934, 1935, 1938, 1946, 1947, 1982, 1984)

Allmänna Idrottsklubben Ishockeyförening (abbreviated AIK IF, also known as AIK Hockey, often abbreviated AIK in hockey subjects), is the ice hockey department of sports club AIK based in Stockholm, Sweden. Since 2014, AIK's men's team compete in HockeyAllsvenskan, the second tier of ice hockey in Sweden, following a four-year spell in the top flight, the SHL. The women's team competes in Swedish Women's Hockey League, the highest division of women's ice hockey. AIK's home games are mainly played at Hovet, which seats 8,094 spectators, though some high-profile games may be played at Avicii Arena which has a larger capacity of 13,850.

In the team's 104-year history, AIK has played 66 seasons in Sweden's top division, 27 of which in the SHL. They have won the Le Mat Trophy as Swedish champions in ice hockey seven times (in 1934, 1935, 1938, 1946, 1947, 1982, and 1984) and have been runners-up an additional six times (in 1930, 1936, 1940, 1968, 1978, and 1981).

== History ==
=== Early years (1921–1977) ===
AIK's ice hockey section was formed in 1921 by Anton Johansson. The team's first competition was a non-championship series, Träningsserien, which they won. However, just two years later, in 1923, the section was shut down, only to be re-founded in 1925.

AIK participated in its first season in the former Elitserien in 1930–31. They finished in fifth place and qualified for the playoffs, where they lost to Södertälje SK in the semifinal. The following season, AIK finished in top place in the league, but again lost in the semifinal to Södertälje. AIK knocked out their fierce rival, Djurgårdens IF, en route to clinching their first championship in 1934. In the final, AIK met Hammarby IF, defeating them by a score of 1–0.

Over the years, AIK would face Hammarby many times in championship battles. In 1935, AIK defended the trophy with another final win against Hammarby, this time with a score of 2–1. In 1936, Hammarby beat AIK when the teams both made it to the final. The first game ended 1–1, and in the second leg, Hammarby won 5–1. In 1938, AIK won their third championship with a 2–0 win in the final against Hammarby. In 1940, IK Göta would reach the final, instead of Hammarby, to meet AIK. AIK lost the final 1–4. It would take four years until AIK returned to the final, with a chance to win the Le Mat Trophy, in 1945. However, AIK lost in the final to Södertälje, but won the championship in the two following years.

After these successful years, AIK would yo-yo between the new first-tier league Division I and the second-tier league Division II from 1954 to 1960. In 1960, AIK entered the highest division again, but it would be almost two decades until the team would make another final. During this period, their best result came in the 1965–66 season, when they reached the quarterfinal.

=== Golden era (1978–1984) ===
In 1978, AIK met Brynäs IF in the semifinals. In Gävle, AIK lost 2–3, which put pressure on AIK's side in the second leg. 9,155 supporters at Hovet saw AIK crush Brynäs 8–0, necessitating a third game, to be played at a neutral arena, Scandinavium. AIK won 3–2 and reached the final against Skellefteå AIK, who had won both semifinal games against Modo. In the final against AIK, Skellefteå won two of the three games and received the gold medals.

After two disappointing consecutive seasons, AIK's golden era began. The team finished in second place in the 1980–81 Elitserien season and made the playoffs. Västra Frölunda IF were their opponents in the semifinals, where AIK easily won 6–3 and 5–1. Skellefteå AIK were seeking to again join AIK in the final. But Färjestads BK won two of three games against them and instead Färjestad reached the final. Färjestad showed strength in the final games and won three out of four games; AIK became the second best team once again.

AIK finished in third place in the following season, eight points behind the winners, Färjestad. AIK faced Färjestad in the semifinals. In Karlstad, AIK won 5–4 and had a great opportunity to qualify for another final game. At home at Hovet, AIK treated their supporters to a 4–0 win. The other team to reach the final was IF Björklöven, who finished in second in Elitserien. Four games were about to be played. AIK lost the first 0–2, but the following two games ended with AIK winning 3–2 and 4–3. The team now had a chance to win the championship at Hovet. Björklöven, though, took their last chance and won 4–2. The final fifth leg was played in Scandinavium in Gothenburg. AIK won 3–2 and became the Swedish champions for the first time in over 30 years. The following season, Färjestad exacted their revenge in the semifinals by knocking out AIK with two wins to one.

But it wouldn't take long for the team and their fans to celebrate once again. AIK finished first in the 1983–84 Elitserien season, ahead of Djurgården, Björklöven and Södertälje. In the semifinals against Södertälje, AIK won the final two games 5–3 and 4–3. Awaiting AIK in the best-of-three finals were Djurgården, this being the first and thus far only time that these two Stockholm rivals met in a Swedish Championship final. AIK won the first game 5–2 and continued on with a 2–0 win in the second leg. The final game ended 4–1 to AIK, who were thus crowned 1984 Swedish Champions, their seventh title, and also their most recent.

=== Yo-yo years, financial trouble, and Division 1 (1985–2006) ===
The success of the 1983–84 season was immediately followed by disappointment, with the club failing to make the playoffs following an eighth-place finish. This was just the beginning however, as the following year, AIK finished 10th, and were relegated to Division 1. This visit to the second tier would be short, with the team finishing a perfect first in their Division 1 group, with an 18–0–0 record, and then finishing first in continuation league Allsvenskan, winning promotion back to Elitserien.

In Elitserien, the playoffs now included quarter finals, where AIK in 1988 won against Djurgården. However, Färjestad knocked out AIK in the semifinals.

In the 1992–93 season, AIK finished last in the first round and were sent down to Allsvenskan after Christmas. AIK finished fourth in Allsvenskan and had to win a best-of-three playoff series to keep their Elitserien hopes alive. But AIK lost two games against Hammarby and were relegated to Division 1.

AIK made it short in Division 1. The team won the Eastern Division and reached Allsvenskan, where they finished on third place and qualified for the playoffs to the Kvalserien. Whilst there, AIK knocked out Skellefteå AIK and joined the final Kvalserien. AIK headed first-placed Bodens IK in the last game and had to beat them by three goals to be promoted to Elitserien. In a remarkable and among the AIK supporters historical game, AIK won against Boden 3–0. AIK's goaltender Rolf Ridderwall saved a penalty shot in the final minutes, which led AIK back to Elitserien.

AIK didn't reach the playoffs in neither the 1994–95 nor 1995–96 season. However, the following season, they made it to the semifinals, after having knocked out Djurgården in the quarterfinals. Luleå HF, though, won three games out of five in the semifinals.

In 1998, AIK once again had to qualify in order to keep playing in Elitserien. This time the team showed their qualities by winning the five entering games and kept their Elitserien spot. The two following seasons AIK missed the playoffs.

In the 2000–01 Elitserien season, AIK played in their last playoff series in that league before their relegation. The team were knocked out by Djurgården in the quarterfinals after having won just one of five games. The following season AIK finished on eleventh place and played in Kvalserien. AIK didn't finish among the promoted teams and were thus relegated to Allsvenskan.

AIK would spend the rest of the decade in divisions below Elitserien. In the team's two seasons in Allsvenskan before being relegated down to Division I, AIK made it to the Kvalserien both years but failed to qualify back to Elitserien both times. After finishing fifth in SuperAllsvenskan in the 2003–04 season, AIK were relegated to the third-tier league Division 1 due to their financial difficulties. AIK finished first in their division the following season and had their chance to qualify for Allsvenskan. Because of the NHL lockout, AIK was strengthened by NHL players Mattias Norström and Georges Laraque. AIK won their Allsvenskan qualifier and were promoted back to Allsvenskan, together with Nybro Vikings IF who finished second.

=== Return to Elitserien (2010) ===
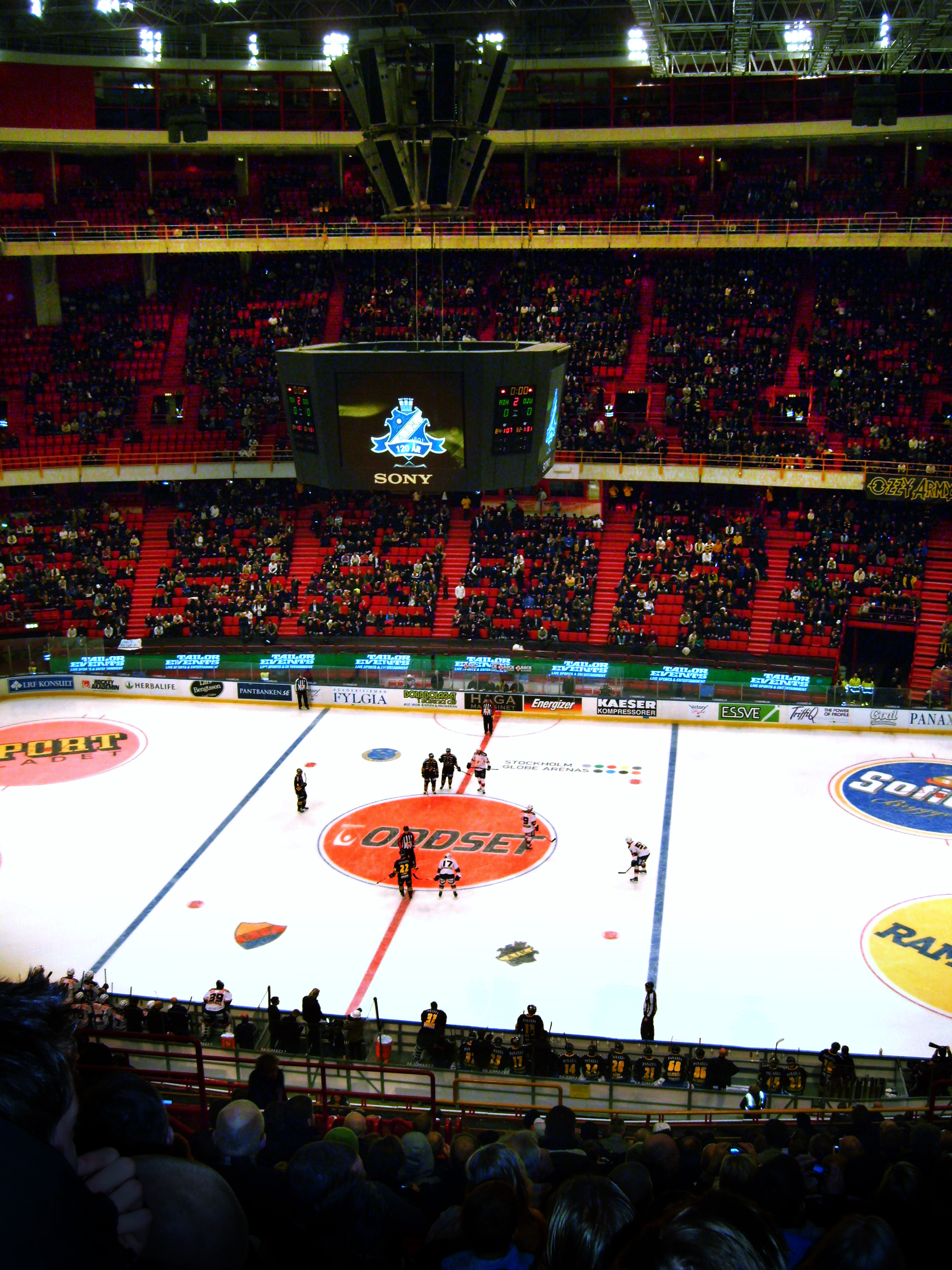
Game between AIK vs. Djurgården Hockey

AIK started a massive effort to return to Elitserien in the 2008–09 season, one of the reasons being financial problems. Former Tre Kronor head coach Roger Melin was appointed, and NHL defenceman Dick Tärnström and Elitserien players such as Christopher Heino-Lindberg and Per Savilahti-Nagander joined the club.

With a second-place finish in HockeyAllsvenskan the following season, AIK qualified for the 2009 Kvalserien, where they finished in third place, just three points behind second placed Rögle BK. With another second-place finish the following season, AIK once again joined the Kvalserien. With only one game left against Växjö Lakers Hockey at Hovet, AIK were on the second and last Elitserien spot with only one point ahead of the third placed team Rögle BK. AIK won the game 2–0 and returned to the top-tier league Elitserien after eight years.

AIK's first season in Elitserien in nine years was a major success. The team were expected by many hockey experts to be forced to play in the Kvalserien qualification for Elitserien, but the team managed to capture the 8th and last playoff spot and thus reached the playoffs. AIK's starting goaltender Viktor Fasth contributed greatly to this success and received the Honken Trophy award as a result. In the playoffs the team went on to beat regular season champions HV71 4–0 in the quarterfinals. In the semifinals, AIK met Färjestads BK, who finished second in the regular season. Färjestad knocked out AIK from the playoffs, beating AIK 4–0 in the semifinals.

In the 2011–12 season, AIK improved and finished 7th and once again qualified for the playoffs. Richard Gynge captured the Håkan Loob Trophy by scoring 28 goals, and Robert Rosén won the scoring league with 60 points (21 goals, 39 assists). Viktor Fasth also won the Honken Trophy for the second consecutive year. Just like last year, AIK were chosen to meet the regular-season champions, Luleå HF, in the quarterfinals. AIK eliminated Luleå in five games and advanced to the semifinals for the second consecutive year, where they would face Skellefteå AIK. AIK were once again eliminated in the semifinals, this time in seven games.

Head coach Roger Melin and assistant coach Gunnar Persson left the club after the 2011–12 season. In replacement, Per-Erik Johnsson was acquired as AIK's new head coach while Mats Lindgren and Anders Hultin became new assistant coaches.

=== KHL invitation (2009) ===
In November 2009, AIK were invited to join the Kontinental Hockey League (KHL). The agreement would have let AIK join the KHL in the 2010–11 season. AIK organized a meeting with the club's supporters where the members would make their decision through voting. However, the Swedish Ice Hockey Association (SIHA) declined AIK's request to join the KHL.

== Season-by-season records ==
Year	Level	Division	Record		Avg. home atnd.	Notes	Ref.
Year	Level	Division	Position	W-OT-L	Avg. home atnd.	Notes	Ref.
This is a partial list, featuring the five most recent seasons. For a more complete list, see List of AIK IF seasons.
2020–21	Tier 2	HockeyAllsvenskan	9th	19–8-3–22	11		
2020–21	Tier 2	Eighth-finals	—	2–0–0–0	0	Won 2–0 vs Tingsryds AIF	
2020–21	Tier 2	HockeyAllsvenskan playoffs	—	1–0–1–2	0	Lost in quarterfinals, 1–3 vs Timrå IK	
2021–22	Tier 2	HockeyAllsvenskan	9th	22–4-0–26	2,842		
2021–22	Tier 2	Eighth-finals	—	0–0–0–2	2,214	Lost 0–2 vs Västerviks IK	
2022–23	Tier 2	HockeyAllsvenskan	10th	17–4-6–25	4,107		
2022–23	Tier 2	Eighth-finals	—	2–0–0–0	2,216	Won 2–0 vs Almtuna IS	
2022–23	Tier 2	HockeyAllsvenskan playoffs	—	1–1–0–4	5,238	Lost in quarterfinals, 2–4 vs MoDo Hockey	
2023–24	Tier 2	HockeyAllsvenskan	3rd	25–7-6–14	4,631		
2023–24	Tier 2	HockeyAllsvenskan playoffs	—	2–0–2–2	5,381	Lost in quarterfinals, 2–4 vs Mora IK	
2024–25	Tier 2	HockeyAllsvenskan	5th	27–7-1–17	4,564		
2024–25	Tier 2	HockeyAllsvenskan playoffs	—	4–5–2–7	7,809	Won in quarterfinals, 4–3 vs IF Björklöven; Won in semifinals, 4–2 vs BIK Karlskoga; Lost in Finals, 1–4 vs Djurgårdens IF	

== Players and personnel ==
=== Current roster ===
Updated 31 July 2025.

No.	Nat	Player	Pos	S/G	Age	Acquired	Birthplace
57	(Sweden)	Alfred Barklund	D	L	25	2022	Stockholm, Sweden
–	(Sweden)	Christopher Bengtsson	C	L	32	2025	Stockholm, Sweden
27	(Sweden)	Christoffer Björk	C	L	26	2022	Umeå, Sweden
–	(Sweden)	Ludwig Blomstrand	LW	L	33	2025	Uppsala, Sweden
63	(Sweden)	Sid Boije	C	R	19	2024	Stockholm, Sweden
30	(Sweden)	Victor Brattström	G	L	29	2024	Göteborg, Sweden
38	(Sweden)	Simon Carlsson	G	L	21	2024	Stockholm, Sweden
14	(Sweden)	Jesper Emanuelsson	LW	L	26	2024	Karlskrona, Sweden
55	(Sweden)	Viggo Gustafsson	D	L	19	2025	Väckelsång, Sweden
25	(Sweden)	Theo Härdstam	RW	L	22	2023	Stockholm, Sweden
64	(Slovenia)	Borna Kopac	RW	L	21	2024	Ljubljana, Slovenia
29	(Sweden)	Daniel Ljungman	C	L	24	2024	Uppsala, Sweden
58	(Sweden)	Oskar Magnusson	C	L	24	2021	Trelleborg, Sweden
19	(Sweden)	Daniel Muzito-Bagenda	C	L	30	2022	Umeå, Sweden
26	(Sweden)	Oscar Nord	C/RW	L	29	2018	Stockholm, Sweden
47	(Sweden)	Eric Norin	D	R	34	2020	Täby, Sweden
–	(Sweden)	William Pethrus	D	R	28	2025	Mariestad, Sweden
12	(United States)	Scott Pooley	RW	R	32	2024	Granger, Indiana, United States
20	(Sweden)	Rasmus Rudslätt	RW	R	22	2021	Stockholm, Sweden
66	(Sweden)	Gustav Sjöqvist	D	L	20	2022	Stockholm, Sweden
23	(Sweden)	Oliver Tärnström	C	L	23	2024	Stockholm, Sweden
7	(Sweden)	Filip Windlert (C)	D	L	33	2020	Stockholm, Sweden
–	(Canada)	Jack York	D	R	25	2025	Kanata, Ontario, Canada
62	(Sweden)	Simon Åkerström	D	L	31	2024	Boden, Sweden

=== Team captains ===
- Rikard Franzén, 2000–01
- Anders Gozzi, 2002–03
- Roger Rosén, 2003–04
- David Engblom, 2004–08
- Dick Tärnström, 2008–13
- Patric Blomdahl, 2013–15
- Christian Sandberg, 2015–19
- Jacob Dahlström, 2019–20
- Filip Windlert, 2020–21
- Christian Sandberg, 2021–23
- Richard Gynge, 2023–24
- Filip Windlert, 2024–present

=== Honored members ===
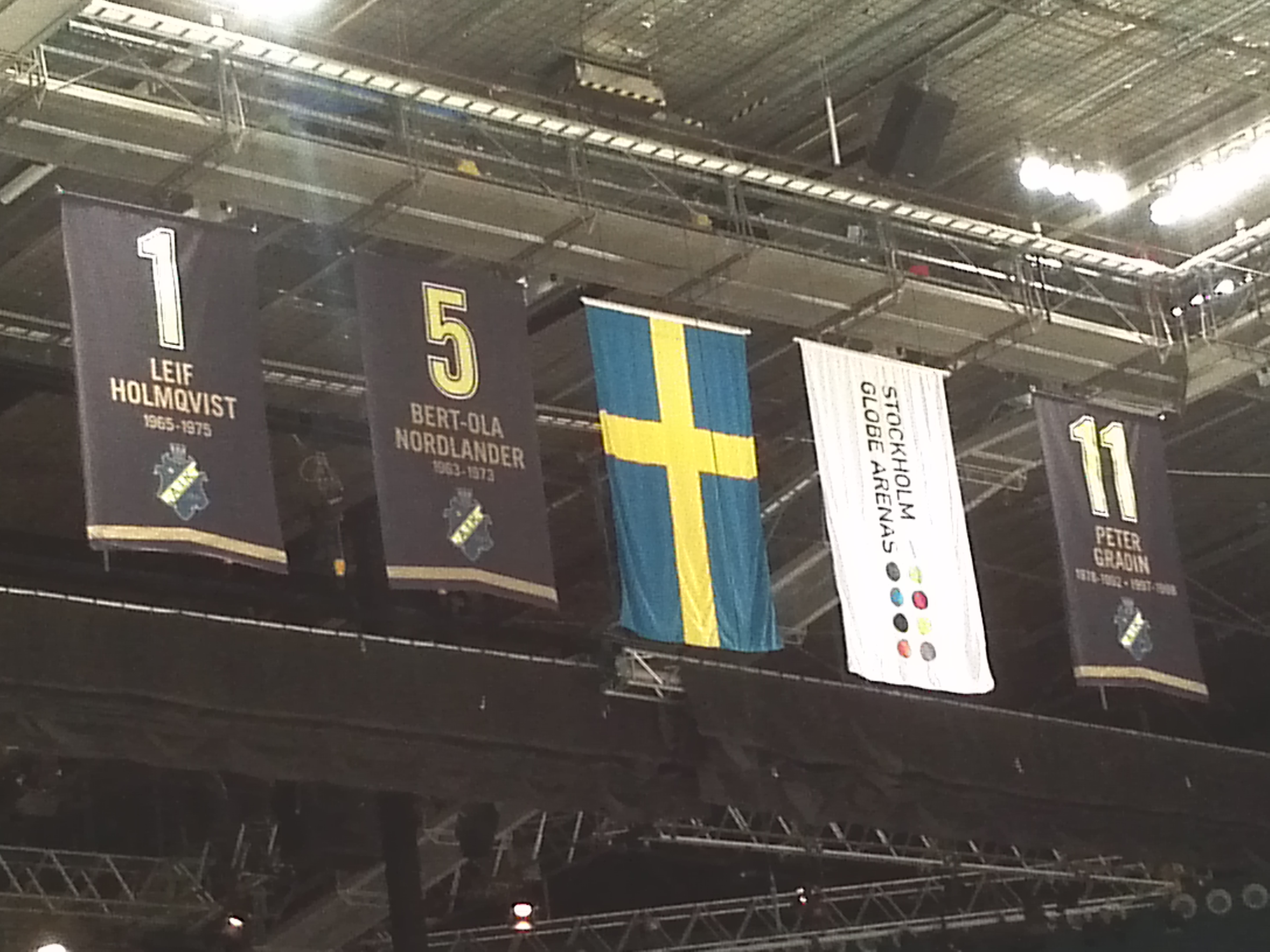
AIK retired numbers at Hovet arena.

AIK IF retired numbers
No.	Player	Position	Career	No. retirement
1	Leif Holmqvist	G	1964–1975	–
2	Mats Thelin	D	1980–1984, 1987–1994	–
5	Bert-Ola Nordlander	D	1963–1973	–
10	Rolf Edberg	C	1970–1978, 1981–1983	–
11	Peter Gradin	LW	1978–1998	–
18	Leif Holmgren	C	1971–1986	–
22	Ulf Nilsson	C	1967–1974	–

== Trophies and awards ==
=== Team ===
- Le Mat Trophy (7): 1934, 1935, 1938, 1946, 1947, 1982, 1984

=== Individual ===
Guldhjälmen

- (Sweden) Rikard Franzén: 1999–2000

Guldpucken

- (Sweden) Bert-Ola Nordlander: 1966–67
- (Sweden) Leif Holmqvist: 1967–68, 1969–70
- (Sweden) Rolf Edberg: 1977–78
- (Sweden) Per-Erik Eklund: 1983–84
- (Sweden) Bo Berglund: 1987–88
- (Sweden) Viktor Fasth: 2010–11

Honken Trophy

- (Sweden) Viktor Fasth: 2010–11, 2011–12

Håkan Loob Trophy

- (Sweden) Robert Burakovsky: 1989–90

Elitserien Rookie of the Year

- (Sweden) Michael Nylander: 1991–92

Rinkens riddare

- (Sweden) Leif Holmqvist: 1967–68
- (Sweden) Mats Lindberg: 1999–2000

== See also ==
- Allmänna Idrottsklubben

Preceded by Hammarby IF	Swedish ice hockey champions 1934, 1935	Succeeded by Hammarby IF
Preceded by Hammarby IF	Swedish ice hockey champions 1938	Succeeded by IK Göta
Preceded by Hammarby IF	Swedish ice hockey champions 1946, 1947	Succeeded by IK Göta
Preceded by Färjestads BK	Swedish ice hockey champions 1982	Succeeded by Djurgårdens IF
Preceded by Djurgårdens IF	Swedish ice hockey champions 1984	Succeeded by Södertälje SK
