= 2013 Channel One Cup =

Tournament details
- Host countries: Russia; Czechia
- Cities: Moscow; Prague
- Venues: 2 (in 2 host cities)
- Dates: 19–22 December 2013
- Teams: 4

Final positions
- Champions: Czech Republic (8th title)
- Runners-up: Finland
- Third place: Russia
- Fourth place: Sweden

Tournament statistics
- Games played: 6
- Goals scored: 26 (4.33 per game)
- Attendance: 47,016 (7,836 per game)
- Scoring leader(s): (Russia) Maxim Chudinov (Finland) Olli Palola (3 points)

The 2013 Channel One Cup was played between 19 and 22 December 2013. The Czech Republic, Finland, Sweden and Russia played a round-robin for a total of three games per team and six games in total. Five of the matches were played in the Bolshoy Ice Dome in Sochi, Russia, and one match in the O2 Arena in Prague, Czech Republic. The tournament was part of 2013–14 Euro Hockey Tour. The tournament was won by Czech Republic.

== Standings ==
Pos	Team	Pld	W	OTW	OTL	L	GF	GA	GD	Pts
1	Czech Republic	3	2	1	0	0	7	3	+4	8
2	Finland	3	2	0	0	1	7	6	+1	6
3	Russia	3	1	0	0	2	6	7	−1	3
4	Sweden	3	0	0	1	2	6	10	−4	1

Source: eurohockey

== Games ==
All times are local. Moscow – (Moscow Time – UTC+3) Prague – (Central European Time – UTC+1)

19 December 2013; 19:00	Czech Republic	2-0 (0-0, 1-0, 1-0)	Finland	O2 Arena, Prague; Attendance: 13,096

Game reference
Jakub Kovar	Goalies	Mikko Koskinen	Referees: (Sweden) Mikael Sjöqvist (Sweden) Mikael Nord
Nedvěd (Cervenka) (PP) – 37:12 / 1-0; Hlinka (EN) – 59:13 / 2-0			Referees: (Sweden) Mikael Sjöqvist (Sweden) Mikael Nord
10 min	Penalties	6 min	Referees: (Sweden) Mikael Sjöqvist (Sweden) Mikael Nord
39	Shots	35	Referees: (Sweden) Mikael Sjöqvist (Sweden) Mikael Nord

19 December 2013; 19:30	Sweden	2-3 (1-1, 0-0, 1-2)	Russia	Bolshoy Ice Dome, Sochi; Attendance: 9,351

Game reference

Linus Ullmark
Goalies
Alexander Yeryomenko
Referees:
(Czech Republic) Martin Frano
(Czech Republic) Robin Sir

Wandell (Kronwall, Klingberg) (PP) – 13:27	1-0
	1-1	17:24 – Chudinov (Popov)
	1-2	43:49 – Chudinov (Shipachyov, Kovalchuk)
Prokhorkin (Averin, Kokarev) – 57:49	2-2
	2-3	52:56 – Burström (Wandell, Karlsson)

8 min
Penalties
10 min
20
Shots
23

21 December 2013; 14:00	Russia	2-3 (0-0, 1-1, 1-2)	Finland	Bolshoy Ice Dome, Sochi; Attendance: 8,851

Game reference

Konstantin Barulin
Goalies
Atte Engren
Referees:
(Czech Republic) Martin Frano
(Czech Republic) Robin Sir

	0-1	21:04 – Palola (Jormakka, Koho)
Chudinov (Medvedev) (PP) – 26:13	1-1
	1-2	58:30 – Hartikainen (Salmela, Mäenpää) (PP)
	1-3	59:10 – Hytönen (Kemppainen) (SHG)
Radulov (Kovalchuk, Tereshchenko) (PP/EN) – 59:59	2-3

12 min
Penalties
16 min
28
Shots
18

21 December 2013; 19:00	Czech Republic	2-1 GWS (0-0, 1-0, 0-1) (OT: 0–0) (SO: 1–0)	Sweden	Bolshoy Ice Dome, Sochi; Attendance: 2,352

Game reference
Jakub Kovar	Goalies	Linus Ullmark	Referees: (Russia) Alexey Anisimov (Russia) Konstantin Olenin
/ 0-1 / 34:59 – Johansson (Hersley, Paulsson) (PP); Kousal (Nemec) – 51:53 / 1-1			Referees: (Russia) Alexey Anisimov (Russia) Konstantin Olenin
Cervenka	Shootout		Referees: (Russia) Alexey Anisimov (Russia) Konstantin Olenin
0 min	Penalties	0 min	Referees: (Russia) Alexey Anisimov (Russia) Konstantin Olenin
33	Shots	29	Referees: (Russia) Alexey Anisimov (Russia) Konstantin Olenin

22 December 2013; 14:00	Russia	1-2 (0-0, 0-0, 1-2)	Czech Republic	Bolshoy Ice Dome, Sochi; Attendance: 9897

Game reference

Alexander Yeryomenko
Goalies
Alexander Salak
Referees:
(Finland) Anssi Salonen
(Finland) Aleksi Rantala

Radulov (PEN) – 40:18	1-0
	1-1	42:23 – Nosek (Kousal, Buchtele)
	1-2	44:08 – Novotny (Šimánek)

6 min
Penalties
6 min
32
Shots
19

22 December 2013; 19:00	Finland	4-2 (0-0, 2-1, 2-1)	Sweden	Bolshoy Ice Dome, Sochi; Attendance: 3,469

Game reference

Mikko Koskinen
Goalies
Henrik Karlsson
Referees:
(Russia) Alexey Anisimov
(Russia) Konstantin Olenin

	0-1	23:47 – Engqvist (Klingberg)
Sallinen (Huhtala, Mäenpää) – 25:28	1-1
Jormakka (Koho, Palola) – 33:55	2-1
Hartikainen (Jalasvaara, Pesonen) – 46:51	3-1
	3-2	50:04 – Engqvist (Rahimi) (SHG)
Palola (EN) – 58:55	4-2

32 min
Penalties
8 min
31
Shots
20

== Scoring leaders ==
Pos	Player	Country	GP	G	A	Pts	+/−	PIM	POS
1	Maxim Chudinov	Russia	3	3	0	3	+1	2	D
2	Olli Palola	Finland	3	2	1	3	+2	0	F
3	Andreas Engqvist	Sweden	3	2	0	2	+1	0	F
4	Teemu Hartikainen	Finland	3	2	0	2	-1	0	F
5	Ilya Kovalchuk	Russia	3	1	1	2	-1	2	F

GP = Games played; G = Goals; A = Assists; Pts = Points; +/− = Plus/minus; PIM = Penalties in minutes; POS = Position
Source: quanthockey

== Goaltending leaders ==
Pos	Player	Country	TOI	GA	GAA	Sv%	SO
1	Alexander Salák	Czech Republic	125:00	2	0.96	96.92	0
2	Mikko Koskinen	Finland	118:47	3	1.52	94.74	0
3	Henrik Karlsson	Sweden	124:07	4	1.93	92.86	0
4	Alexander Yeryomenko	Russia	118:41	4	2.42	89.74	0

TOI = Time on ice (minutes:seconds); SA = Shots against; GA = Goals against; GAA = Goals Against Average; Sv% = Save percentage; SO = Shutouts
Source: swehockey
