= Håkan Loob Trophy =

- Date: 1976
- Country: Sweden

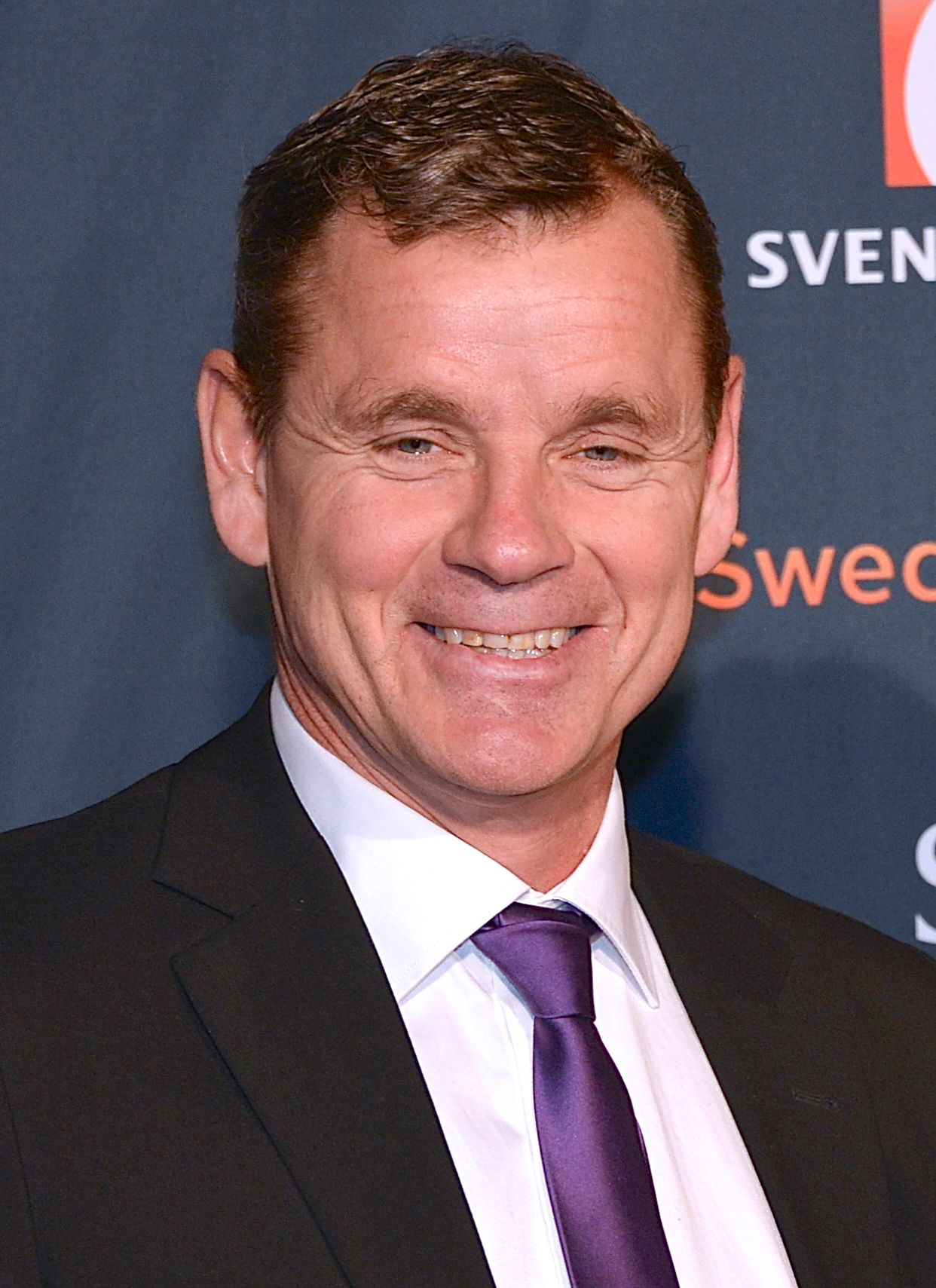
Håkan Loob at the Sports Gala at the Globen in Stockholm on January 14, 2013.

The Håkan Loob Trophy is the annual award for the Swedish Hockey League (SHL) player who scores the most goals during the regular season. It was created by Svenska Hockeyligan and Canal+ in honour of Håkan Loob, who holds the SHL record for most goals in a season (42 goals). It was first handed out for the 2005–06 season, on Elitserien's 30 year anniversary.

The winner's team is awarded 1,000 Swedish kronor per goal scored by the player, which goes to the club's youth programme.

== Winners ==
Season	Winner	Team	Goals	Win #
1975–76	Lars Erik Ridderström	Brynäs IF	35	1
1976–77	Mats Åhlberg	Leksands IF	39	1
1977–78	Martin Karlsson	Skellefteå AIK	33	1
1978–79	Per Lundqvist	Modo Hockey	31	1
1979–80	Anders Steen	Färjestad BK	30	1
1980–81	Erkki Laine	Leksands IF	30	1
1981–82	Ivan Hansen	Leksands IF	28	1
1982–83	Håkan Loob	Färjestad BK	42	1
1983–84	Kenneth Andersson	Brynäs IF	25	1
1984–85	Erkki Laine	Färjestad BK	28	2
1985–86	Tore Ökvist	IF Björklöven	30	1
1986–87	Lars-Gunnar Pettersson	IF Björklöven	28	1
1987–88	Eddy Ericsson	Västerås HK	30	1
1988–89	Lars-Gunnar Pettersson	Luleå HF	29	2
1989–90	Robert Burakovsky	AIK	28	1
1990–91	Håkan Loob	Färjestad BK	33	2
1991–92	Håkan Loob	Färjestad BK	37	3
1992–93	Håkan Loob	Färjestad BK	25	4
1993–94	Tomáš Sršeň	Rögle BK	28	1
1994–95	Tomas Forslund	Leksands IF	24	1
1995–96	Jonas Höglund	Färjestad BK	32	1
1996–97	Evgeny Davydov	Brynäs IF	30	1
1997–98	Patric Kjellberg	Djurgårdens IF	30	1
1998–99	Tom Bissett	Brynäs IF	40	1
1999–2000	Jan Larsson	Brynäs IF	26	1
2000–01	Kristian Huselius	Frölunda HC	32	1
2001–02	Peter Högardh; Jörgen Jönsson	Modo Hockey; Färjestad BK	22	1; 1
2002–03	Magnus Wernblom	Modo Hockey	26	1
2003–04	Magnus Kahnberg	Frölunda HC	33	1
2004–05	Mike Knuble; Mattias Weinhandl	Linköping HC; Modo Hockey	26	1; 1
2005–06	Tomi Kallio; Andreas Karlsson	Frölunda HC; HV71	26	1; 1
2006–07	Pavel Brendl	Mora IK	34	1
2007–08	Mattias Weinhandl	Linköping HC	35	2 (1)
2008–09	Per-Åge Skrøder	Modo Hockey	30	1
2009–10	Jan Hlaváč	Linköping HC	30	1
2010–11	Mikko Lehtonen	Skellefteå AIK	30	1
2011–12	Richard Gynge	AIK	28	1
2012–13	Carl Söderberg	Linköping HC	31	1
2013–14	Chad Kolarik	Linköping HC	30	1
2014–15	Broc Little	Linköping HC	28	1
2015–16	Nick Johnson	Brynäs IF	22	1
2016–17	Kevin Clark	Brynäs IF	23	1
2017–18	Victor Olofsson	Frölunda HC	27	1
2018–19	Emil Bemström	Djurgårdens IF	23	1
2019–20	Broc Little	Linköping HC	24	2
2020–21	Simon Ryfors; Daniel Viksten	Rögle BK; Färjestad BK	25	1; 1
2021–22	Max Véronneau	Leksands IF	34	1
2022–23	Antti Suomela	IK Oskarshamn	37	1
2023–24	David Tomášek	Färjestad BK	25	1
2024–25	Oskar Steen	Färjestad BK	30	1
2025–26	Jonathan Dahlén; Oscar Lindberg	Timrå IK; Skellefteå AIK	30	1; 1
