= Salming Trophy =

- Date: 2008
- Country: Sweden

The Salming Trophy is awarded to the best Swedish-born defenceman playing in Sweden. It is named after Börje Salming, who was named to the IIHF Centennial All-Star Team in 2008.

== Winners ==
Season	Player	Team	Win #
2007–08	Mikko Luoma	HV71	1
2008–09	Marcus Ragnarsson	Djurgårdens IF	1
2009–10	Magnus Johansson	Linköpings HC	1
2010–11	David Rundblad	Skellefteå AIK	1
2011–12	Mattias Ekholm	Brynäs IF	1
2012–13	Magnus Nygren	Färjestad BK	1
2013–14	Patrik Hersley	Leksands IF	1
2014–15	Tim Heed	Skellefteå AIK	1
2015–16	Niclas Burström	Skellefteå AIK	1
2016–17	Henrik Tömmernes	Frölunda HC	1
2017–18	Lawrence Pilut	HV71	1
2018–19	Erik Gustafsson	Luleå HF	1
2019–20	Not awarded due to COVID-19		
2020–21	Nils Lundkvist	Luleå HF	1
2021–22	Maja Nylén Persson	Brynäs IF (SDHL)	1
2022–23	Jonathan Pudas	Skellefteå AIK	1
2023–24	Axel Sandin-Pellikka	Skellefteå AIK	1
2024–25	Victor Söderström	Brynäs IF	1
