= Erik Källgren =

Swedish ice hockey player

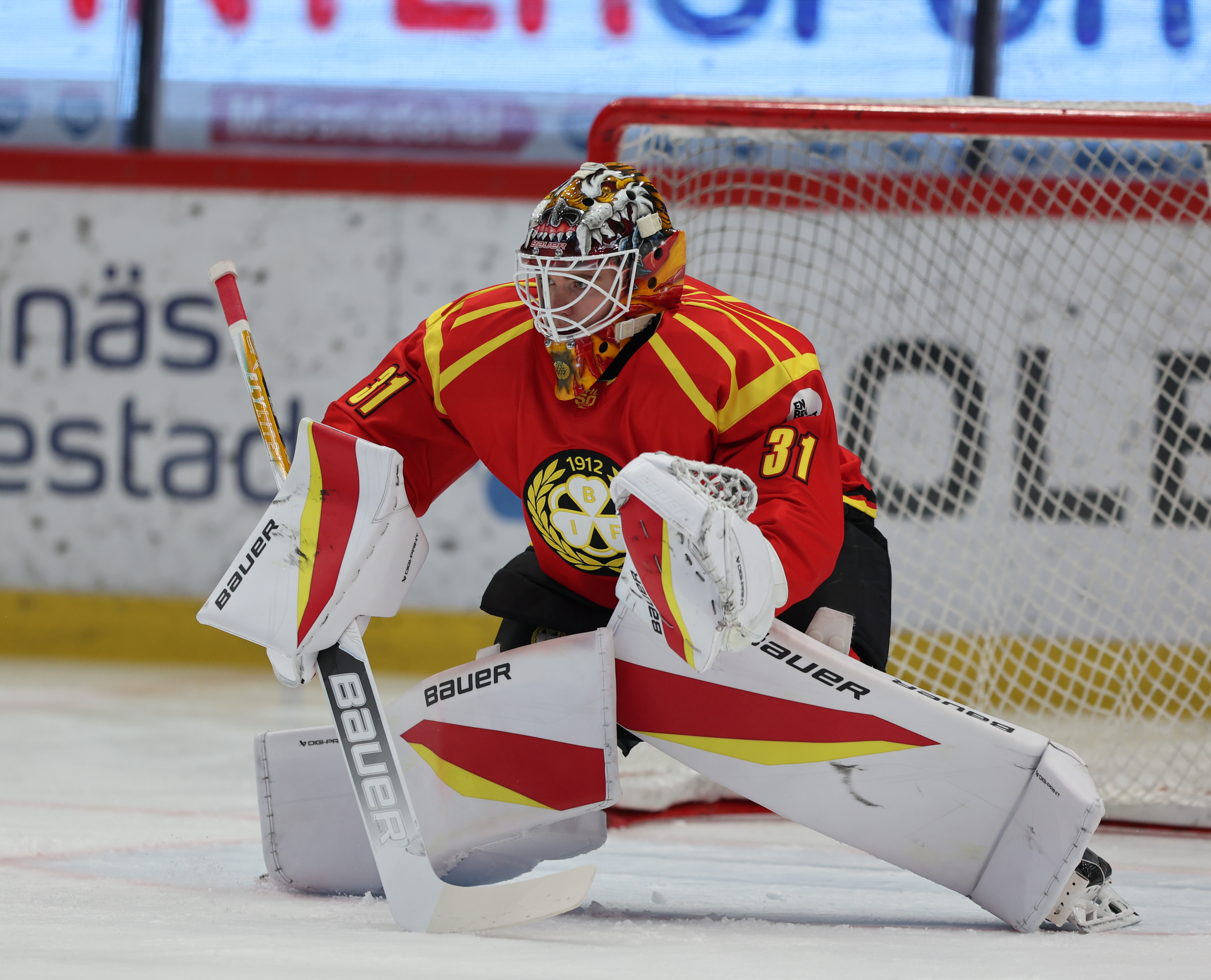
- Källgren with Brynäs IF in 2026
- Born: 14 October 1996 (age 29) Stockholm, Sweden
- Height: 191 cm (6 ft 3 in)
- Weight: 90 kg (198 lb; 14 st 2 lb)
- Position: Goaltender
- Catches: Left
- SHL team Former teams: Brynäs IF; Växjö Lakers; TPS; Toronto Maple Leafs
- NHL draft: 183rd overall, 2015; Arizona Coyotes
- Playing career: 2015–present

Erik Källgren (/ˈʃælɡrɛn/ SHAL-gren; Swedish: [ˈɕɛ̂lɡreːn]; born 14 October 1996) is a Swedish professional ice hockey player who is a goaltender for Brynäs IF of the Swedish Hockey League (SHL). Källgren was drafted in the seventh round, 183rd overall, of the 2015 NHL entry draft by the Arizona Coyotes, and made his National Hockey League (NHL) debut in 2022 with the Toronto Maple Leafs.

== Playing career ==
In the 2020–21 season, Källgren appeared in 21 regular season games for the Växjö Lakers collecting 12 wins with a 2.37 goals-against average and a .911 save percentage. In 10 postseason games, Källgren posted a 7–3–0 record with a .937 save percentage, capturing the Swedish Hockey League (SHL) championship.

As a free agent following his break-out year, Källgren initially joined fellow SHL outfit, Frölunda HC, on a two-year deal on 17 May 2021. However just two days later, Källgren used his NHL opt-out clause, agreeing to a two-year, two-way contract to return to North America with the Toronto Maple Leafs on 19 May 2021.

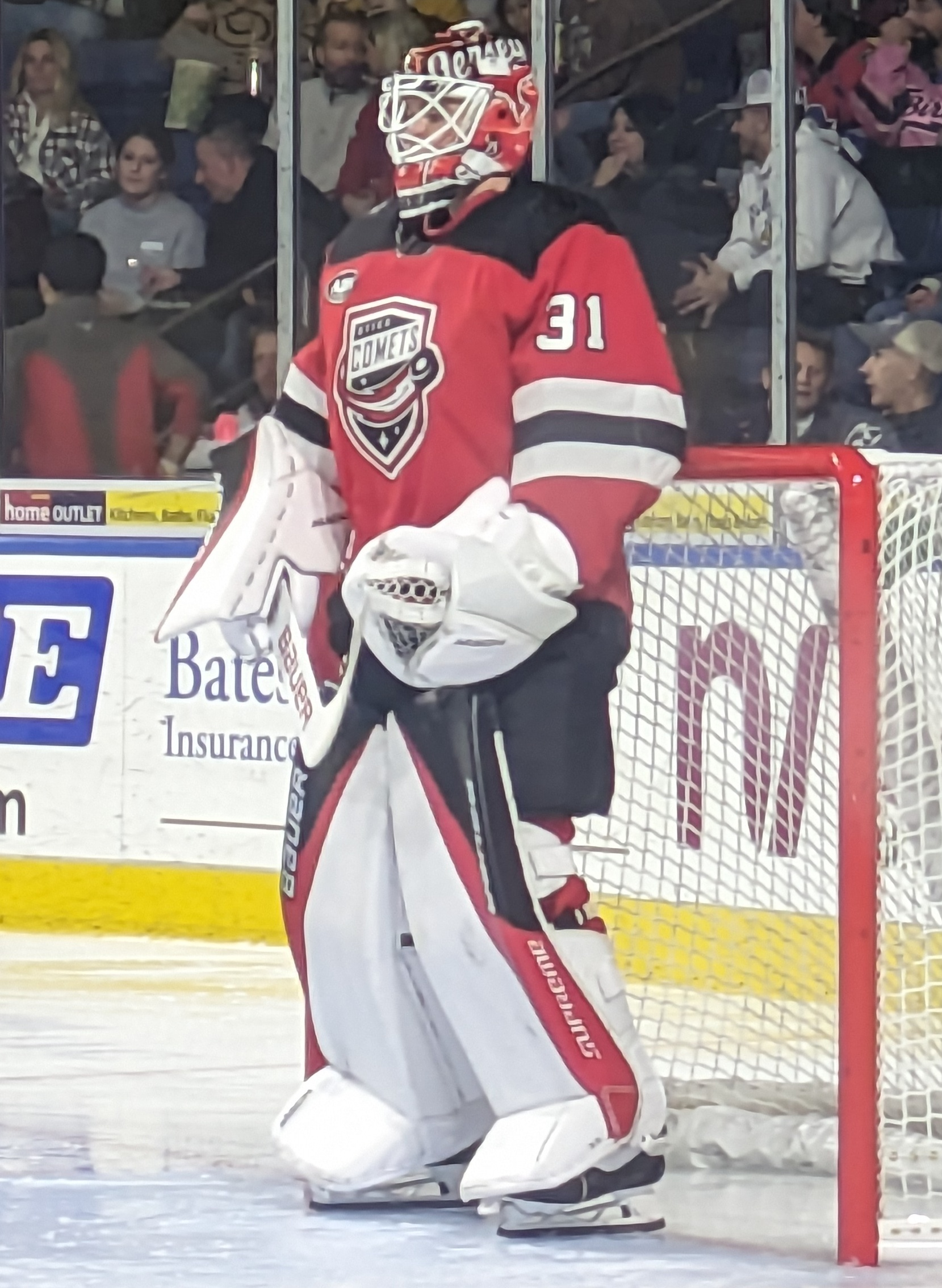
Källgren with the Utica Comets in 2023

Källgren began the next season with the Toronto Marlies, but was called up by the team on 10 March 2022, on an emergency basis after starting netminder Jack Campbell was announced to have an injury. Källgren served as backup that same night in a game against the Arizona Coyotes. After goaltender Petr Mrázek allowed four goals on twelve shots, Källgren was placed in the team goal and made his NHL debut, playing just over 30 minutes and allowing one goal as the team fell in overtime, 5–4.

On 15 March, Källgren recorded his first career NHL shutout in his first career NHL start against the Dallas Stars. Källgren faced 35 shots in the 4–0 victory. He became the fourth Maple Leaf goalie to record a shutout in his first NHL start.

Following two seasons within the Maple Leafs organization, Källgren left as a free agent to sign a one-year, two-way contract with the New Jersey Devils for the 2023–24 season on 1 July 2023. Källgren was assigned to AHL affiliate, the Utica Comets, for the duration of his contract with the Devils, posting four wins through 16 regular season games.

On 3 May 2024, Källgren as a pending free agent opted to return to his native Sweden, signing a three-year contract with Brynäs IF in their return to the SHL following promotion from HockeyAllsvenskan.

== Career statistics ==
			Regular season									Playoffs
Season	Team	League	GP	W	L	OTL	MIN	GA	SO	GAA	SV%	GP	W	L	MIN	GA	SO	GAA	SV%
2014–15	IK Oskarshamn	Allsv	3	2	1	0	145	6	0	2.49	.896	—	—	—	—	—	—	—	—
2015–16	IK Oskarshamn	Allsv	20	9	10	0	1,149	53	1	2.77	.897	—	—	—	—	—	—	—	—
2016–17	IK Oskarshamn	Allsv	22	11	10	0	1,165	49	1	2.52	.912	—	—	—	—	—	—	—	—
2017–18	AIK	Allsv	28	16	11	0	1,659	67	2	2.42	.907	3	1	2	185	6	0	1.95	0.918
2018–19	AIK	Allsv	32	18	12	0	1,841	62	5	2.02	.920	1	1	0	0	60	1	1.00	0.964
2019–20	Rapid City Rush	ECHL	3	2	1	0	178	8	0	2.70	.924	—	—	—	—	—	—	—	—
2019–20	Tucson Roadrunners	AHL	2	0	1	0	68	1	0	0.89	.967	—	—	—	—	—	—	—	—
2019–20	Växjö Lakers	SHL	2	0	2	0	76	7	0	5.51	.837	—	—	—	—	—	—	—	—
2019–20	TPS	Liiga	18	6	8	0	1,058	41	1	2.33	.911	—	—	—	—	—	—	—	—
2020–21	Växjö Lakers	SHL	21	12	9	0	1,265	50	1	2.37	.911	10	7	3	621	18	1	1.74	.930
2021–22	Toronto Marlies	AHL	26	15	8	1	1,388	70	1	3.02	.904	—	—	—	—	—	—	—	—
2021–22	Toronto Maple Leafs	NHL	14	8	4	1	780	43	1	3.31	.888	1	0	0	31	0	0	0.00	1.000
2022–23	Toronto Maple Leafs	NHL	10	3	2	4	562	25	0	2.67	.898	—	—	—	—	—	—	—	—
2022–23	Toronto Marlies	AHL	24	10	9	2	1,306	71	0	3.26	.883	4	2	1	204	11	0	3.24	.883
2023–24	Utica Comets	AHL	16	4	6	3	795	48	1	3.62	.872	—	—	—	—	—	—	—	—
2024–25	Brynäs IF	SHL	32	20	12	0	1,864	81	2	2.61	.891	11	5	4	544	30	0	3.31	.855
SHL totals			55	32	23	0	3,205	138	3	2.58	.897	21	12	7	1,165	48	1	2.47	.897
NHL totals			24	11	6	5	1,342	68	1	3.04	.892	1	0	0	31	0	0	0.00	1.000

== Awards and honours ==
Award	Year
SHL
Le Mat Trophy champion	2021
