= Fredrik Karlström =

Swedish ice hockey player (born 1998)

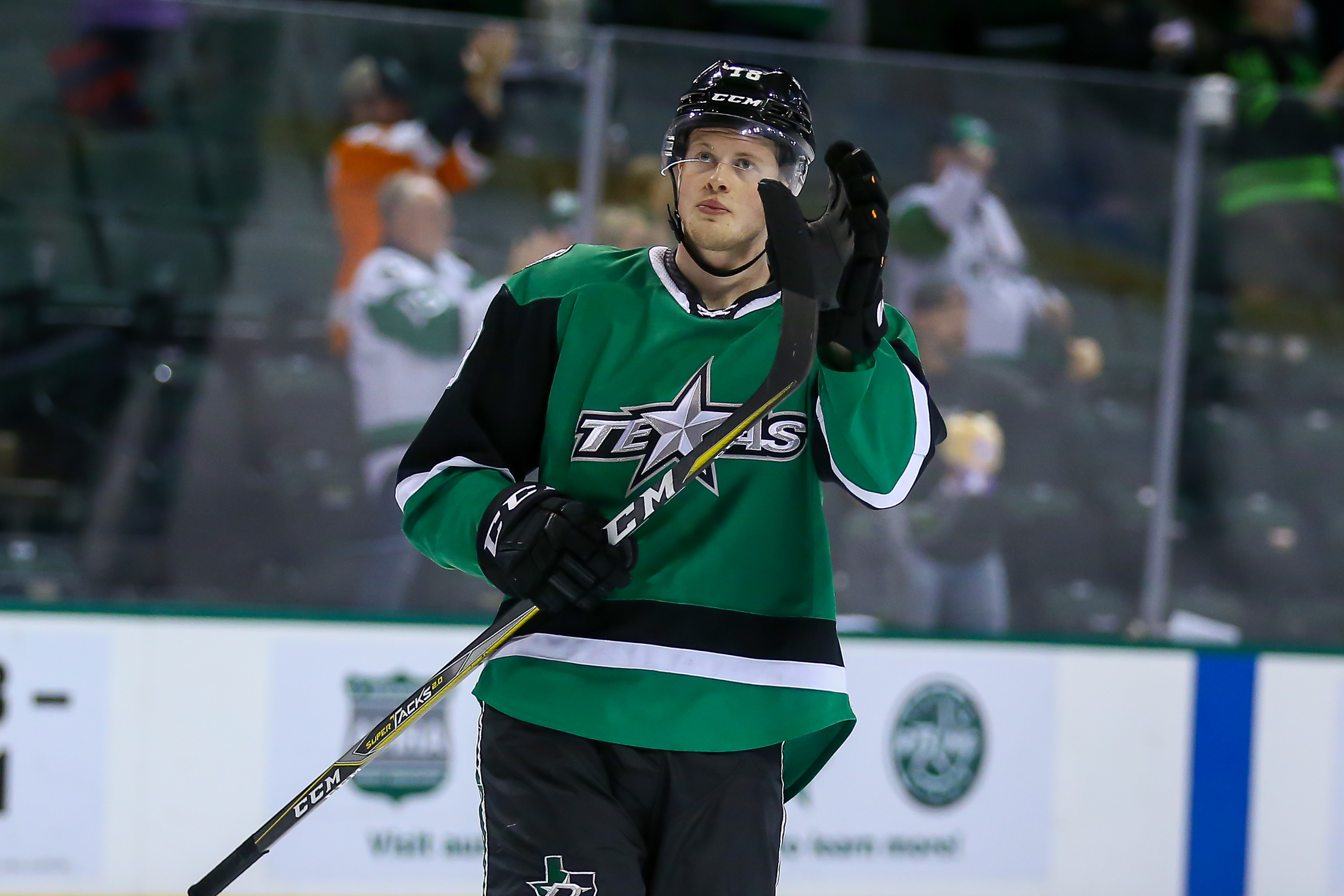
- Born: 12 January 1998 (age 28) Stockholm, Sweden
- Height: 6 ft 2 in (188 cm)
- Weight: 196 lb (89 kg; 14 st 0 lb)
- Position: Centre
- Shoots: Left
- SHL team Former teams: Linköping HC; Växjö Lakers; Dallas Stars
- NHL draft: 90th overall, 2016; Dallas Stars
- Playing career: 2016–present

Fredrik Karlström (born 12 January 1998) is a Swedish professional ice hockey forward for Linköping HC of the Swedish Hockey League (SHL). He previously played for the Dallas Stars where was drafted in the third round, 90th overall, of the 2016 NHL entry draft.

== Playing career ==
During the 2018–19 season, Karlström was briefly loaned to his youth club, AIK in the HockeyAllsvenskan (Allsv) on from his SHL club, Linköping HC. Karlström returned after 6 games to finish the season in the SHL with 10 points in 45 games.

Out of contract with Linköping in the off-season, Karlström left to sign a two-year contract with rival club, the Växjö Lakers, on 8 April 2019.

On 2 June 2020, Karlström was signed to a two-year, entry-level contract with the Dallas Stars. It was announced that Karlström would continue his development with the Växjö Lakers on loan from the Stars for the 2020–21 season.

At the conclusion of his contract with the Stars following the 2023–24 season, Karlström left as a free agent and was signed to a one-year, two-way contract with the New York Islanders on July 2, 2024.

Following a lone season within the Islanders organization, Karlström as a pending free agent opted to return to his native Sweden, signing a four-year contract with his original club, Linköping HC of the SHL, on 8 May 2025.

== Career statistics ==
=== Regular season and playoffs ===
			Regular season					Playoffs
Season	Team	League	GP	G	A	Pts	PIM	GP	G	A	Pts	PIM
2014–15	AIK	J20	0	0	0	0	0	1	0	0	0	2
2015–16	AIK	J20	44	13	20	33	16	6	5	6	11	4
2015–16	AIK	Allsv	2	0	0	0	2	—	—	—	—	—
2016–17	AIK	J20	1	0	0	0	0	5	3	4	7	0
2016–17	AIK	Allsv	45	9	15	24	4	7	1	0	1	0
2017–18	Linköping HC	J20	4	2	0	2	4	—	—	—	—	—
2017–18	Linköping HC	SHL	35	2	3	5	6	—	—	—	—	—
2018–19	Linköping HC	SHL	45	4	6	10	8	—	—	—	—	—
2018–19	AIK	Allsv	6	1	1	2	4	—	—	—	—	—
2019–20	Växjö Lakers	SHL	52	10	10	20	6	—	—	—	—	—
2020–21	Växjö Lakers	SHL	51	10	15	25	14	14	5	5	10	2
2021–22	Texas Stars	AHL	65	16	13	29	4	2	1	0	1	0
2021–22	Dallas Stars	NHL	3	0	1	1	0	—	—	—	—	—
2022–23	Texas Stars	AHL	47	10	16	26	16	—	—	—	—	—
2022–23	Dallas Stars	NHL	5	0	0	0	0	—	—	—	—	—
2023–24	Texas Stars	AHL	72	21	23	44	12	7	3	5	8	0
2024–25	Bridgeport Islanders	AHL	30	9	4	13	12	—	—	—	—	—
SHL totals			183	26	34	60	34	14	5	5	10	2
NHL totals			8	0	1	1	0	—	—	—	—	—

Medal record

Representing Sweden

Ice hockey

World Junior Championships
Silver medal – second place	2018 United States	

=== International ===
Year	Team	Event	Result	GP	G	A	Pts	PIM
2017	Sweden	WJC	4th	7	1	2	3	0
2018	Sweden	WJC	2nd place, silver medalist(s)	7	0	3	3	6
Junior totals				14	1	5	6	6
