= Patrik Hersley =

Swedish ice hockey player (born 1986)

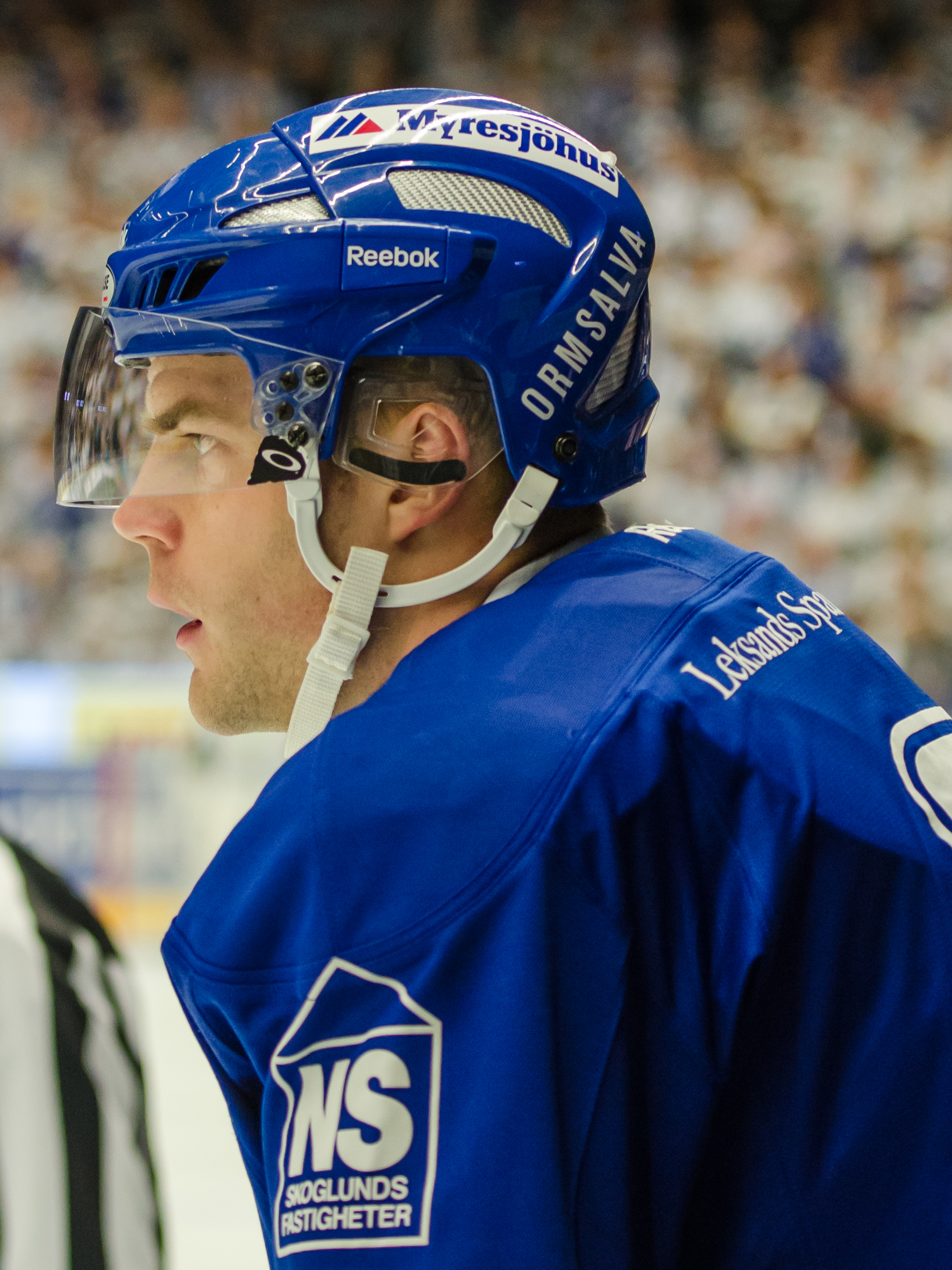
- Hersley playing for Leksands IF in 2013
- Born: June 23, 1986 (age 40) Malmö, Sweden
- Height: 6 ft 3 in (191 cm)
- Weight: 209 lb (95 kg; 14 st 13 lb)
- Position: Defence
- Shot: Right
- Played for: Modo Hockey; Leksands IF; Sibir Novosibirsk; Lokomotiv Yaroslavl; SKA Saint Petersburg; Spartak Moscow; Malmö Redhawks; Krefeld Pinguine
- National team: Sweden
- NHL draft: 139th overall, 2005; Los Angeles Kings
- Playing career: 2005–2022

Patrik Hersley (born June 23, 1986) is a Swedish former professional ice hockey defenceman.

== Playing career ==
Being a native of Malmö and beginning his career in Malmö Redhawks, at the time regularly oscillating between Elitserien (SHL) and HockeyAllsvenskan, Hersley was drafted by the Los Angeles Kings in the fifth round as the 139th player in the 2005 NHL entry draft. Hersley was traded from the Kings to the Philadelphia Flyers, along with Ned Lukacevic, in exchange for Denis Gauthier and a second round choice in the 2010 NHL entry draft on July 1, 2008. On September 23, 2009, Hersley was traded by the Flyers to the Nashville Predators for future considerations.

After two years in the North American ice hockey scene and another two back with the Redhawks in Malmö, as well as a brief stint with Modo Hockey, Hersley was signed to a two-year extension contract during the 2011–12 season with Leksands IF on March 13, 2012.

While having his true breakthrough season in 2013–14, Hersley scored his 22nd goal of the season on February 8, 2014, setting a new record for the number of goals by a defenceman in an SHL regular season. He also scored a hat trick while playing against Örebro HK. The previous record was set by Jan Huokko, also for Leksands IF, in the 1998–99 season with 21 goals. Hersley added another two goals to finish the regular season with 24 goals. He was awarded the Salming Trophy, as the best defenceman in the SHL, for the 2013–14 season.

After the season, Hersley signed a one-year contract with Russian club, HC Sibir Novosibirsk in the KHL for the 2014–15 season.

After three successful seasons with SKA Saint Petersburg, Hersley left as a free agent to continue in the KHL with HC Spartak Moscow, agreeing to a one-year contract on 19 June 2019.

As a free agent from Spartak, Hersley opted to return to his native Malmö, signing a one-year contract with the Redhawks on November 9, 2020.

== Career statistics ==
=== Regular season and playoffs ===
			Regular season					Playoffs
Season	Team	League	GP	G	A	Pts	PIM	GP	G	A	Pts	PIM
2001–02	MIF Redhawks	J18 Allsv	6	0	0	0	0	—	—	—	—	—
2002–03	MIF Redhawks	J18 Allsv	9	3	4	7	53	4	1	2	3	4
2002–03	MIF Redhawks	J20	16	0	2	2	4	1	0	0	0	0
2003–04	Malmö Redhawks	J18 Allsv	2	2	0	2	4	—	—	—	—	—
2003–04	Malmö Redhawks	J20	17	1	4	5	16	8	0	2	2	2
2004–05	Malmö Redhawks	J20	31	8	14	22	104	3	2	1	3	6
2004–05	Malmö Redhawks	SEL	8	0	1	1	0	—	—	—	—	—
2005–06	Malmö Redhawks	J20	13	10	9	19	38	—	—	—	—	—
2005–06	Malmö Redhawks	Allsv	34	5	8	13	32	7	1	0	1	6
2006–07	Malmö Redhawks	J20	2	1	3	4	14	—	—	—	—	—
2006–07	Malmö Redhawks	SEL	28	1	1	2	10	—	—	—	—	—
2006–07	IK Pantern	SWE.3	2	1	1	2	8	—	—	—	—	—
2007–08	Manchester Monarchs	AHL	42	1	8	9	27	—	—	—	—	—
2007–08	Reading Royals	ECHL	20	3	15	18	18	13	3	6	9	10
2008–09	Philadelphia Phantoms	AHL	5	0	0	0	2	—	—	—	—	—
2008–09	Reading Royals	ECHL	15	0	4	4	8	—	—	—	—	—
2009–10	Malmö Redhawks	Allsv	48	16	15	31	71	—	—	—	—	—
2010–11	Malmö Redhawks	Allsv	50	10	14	24	65	—	—	—	—	—
2011–12	Modo Hockey	SEL	11	0	0	0	2	—	—	—	—	—
2011–12	Sundsvall IF	Allsv	4	0	1	1	0	—	—	—	—	—
2011–12	Leksands IF	Allsv	17	3	2	5	4	10	0	5	5	2
2012–13	Leksands IF	Allsv	52	13	17	30	55	10	3	3	6	14
2013–14	Leksands IF	SHL	51	24	11	35	18	3	1	2	3	0
2014–15	Sibir Novosibirsk	KHL	34	11	10	21	10	—	—	—	—	—
2015–16	Lokomotiv Yaroslavl	KHL	56	4	8	12	41	5	0	2	2	0
2016–17	Lokomotiv Yaroslavl	KHL	7	1	0	1	0	—	—	—	—	—
2016–17	SKA Saint Petersburg	KHL	23	4	9	13	6	16	6	12	18	6
2017–18	SKA Saint Petersburg	KHL	43	14	21	35	20	13	1	4	5	8
2018–19	SKA Saint Petersburg	KHL	36	14	19	33	6	12	0	3	3	4
2019–20	Spartak Moscow	KHL	55	8	14	22	14	6	3	1	4	2
2020–21	Malmö Redhawks	SHL	33	4	7	11	8	2	0	1	1	0
2021–22	Krefeld Pinguine	DEL	19	2	6	8	4	—	—	—	—	—
SHL totals			131	29	20	49	38	11	1	3	4	2
Allsv totals			205	47	57	104	227	28	4	8	12	24
KHL totals			276	61	88	149	115	64	13	28	41	26

=== International ===
Year	Team	Event	Result	GP	G	A	Pts	PIM
2018	Sweden	OG	5th	3	1	0	1	4
Senior totals				3	1	0	1	4

== Awards and honors ==
Award	Year
SHL
Salming Trophy	2014
KHL
All-Star Game	2015, 2018
Gagarin Cup (SKA Saint Petersburg)	2017
