= Pontus Holmberg =

Swedish ice hockey player (born 1999)

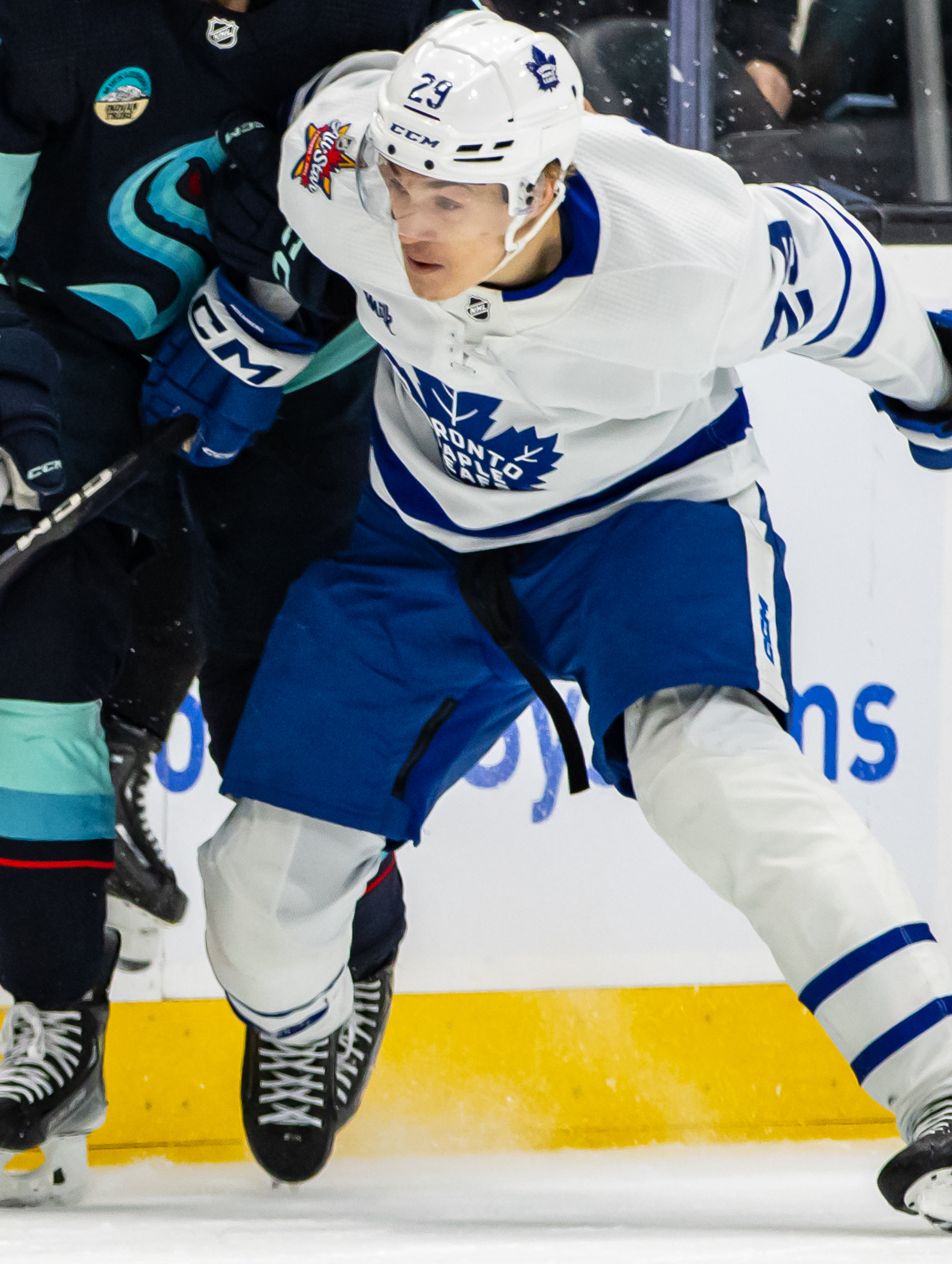
- Holmberg with the Toronto Maple Leafs in 2024
- Born: 9 March 1999 (age 27) Västerås, Sweden
- Height: 5 ft 10 in (178 cm)
- Weight: 174 lb (79 kg; 12 st 6 lb)
- Position: Left wing
- Shoots: Left
- NHL team Former teams: Tampa Bay Lightning; Växjö Lakers; Toronto Maple Leafs
- National team: Sweden
- NHL draft: 156th overall, 2018; Toronto Maple Leafs
- Playing career: 2018–present

Pontus Holmberg (born 9 March 1999) is a Swedish professional ice hockey player who is a left winger for the Tampa Bay Lightning of the National Hockey League (NHL). He was selected 156th overall by the Toronto Maple Leafs in the 2018 NHL entry draft, and has played for the Växjö Lakers of the Swedish Hockey League (SHL).

== Playing career ==
He made his debut for Växjö Lakers in the Swedish Hockey League (SHL) in 2018, playing two games. In the 2020–21 SHL season, the Växjö Lakers were the top team in the regular season. They won the Le Mat Trophy as the playoff winners, with Holmberg awarded the Stefan Liv Memorial Trophy as the playoff MVP with seven goals and 14 points in 14 playoff games.

He was drafted 156th overall by the Maple Leafs in the 2018 NHL entry draft after the team traded for the opportunity to select him. On 4 June 2021, Holmberg was signed by the Maple Leafs to a two-year, entry-level contract. He would remain in the SHL with the Växjö Lakers on loan from Toronto for the 2021–22 season, but after his team's SHL season ended, he played the last six games of the Toronto Marlies season, scoring two goals and four points.

Holmberg joined the Maple Leafs for training camp before the 2022–23 season. He was considered among the young players who could make the team out of camp. Holmberg was demoted to the Toronto Marlies and played seven games with them before being recalled to the Maple Leafs. He played his first NHL game on 2 November versus the Philadelphia Flyers, and scored his first NHL goal on Vítek Vaněček on 23 November versus the New Jersey Devils in New Jersey.

Holmberg took part in the Maple Leafs' 2023 training camp but failed to make the team. He was assigned to the Marlies to begin the season. However, after Tyler Bertuzzi was injured, Holmberg was recalled on 20 October. He played in seven games with the Maple Leafs before being returned to the Marlies. He made the Maple Leafs out of the 2024 training camp, playing on third line with Max Pacioretty and Nick Robertson.

Upon the conclusion of the 2024–25 season, Holmberg was not tendered a qualifying offer by the Maple Leafs to retain his rights and subsequently released to unrestricted free agency, largely due to the arbitration rights Holmberg would have been privy to as an experienced restricted free agent. On 1 July 2025, the opening day of free agency, Holmberg signed a two-year deal with the Tampa Bay Lightning, carrying an average annual value of $1.55 million.

== International play ==
Medal record

Representing Sweden

Ice hockey

World Championships
Bronze medal – third place	2024 Czechia	

Holmberg was selected for Sweden's junior team at the 2019 World Juniors where the team was upset by Switzerland in the quarterfinals of the tournament. He represented Sweden at the 2022 Winter Olympics, where Sweden was defeated by Slovakia in the bronze medal game. At the 2024 IIHF World Championship he won a bronze medal, while playing on a line with Lucas Raymond and André Burakovsky. He appeared in ten games, registering six assists.

== Career statistics ==
=== Regular season and playoffs ===
			Regular season					Playoffs
Season	Team	League	GP	G	A	Pts	PIM	GP	G	A	Pts	PIM
2015–16	VIK Västerås HK	J18	32	9	25	34	8	2	2	0	2	0
2016–17	VIK Västerås HK	J18	8	9	11	20	6	—	—	—	—	—
2016–17	VIK Västerås HK	J18 Allsv	2	0	0	0	0	8	4	4	8	0
2016–17	VIK Västerås HK	J20	45	6	12	18	10	—	—	—	—	—
2017–18	VIK Västerås HK	J20	12	5	6	11	4	—	—	—	—	—
2017–18	VIK Västerås HK	Div.1	36	7	13	20	10	8	2	4	6	2
2017–18	Växjö Lakers	SHL	2	0	0	0	0	—	—	—	—	—
2018–19	Växjö Lakers	SHL	47	3	7	10	12	7	0	0	0	2
2019–20	Växjö Lakers	SHL	52	7	10	17	14	—	—	—	—	—
2020–21	Växjö Lakers	SHL	45	9	14	23	16	14	7	7	14	8
2021–22	Växjö Lakers	SHL	46	11	30	41	44	4	0	1	1	2
2021–22	Toronto Marlies	AHL	6	2	2	4	2	—	—	—	—	—
2022–23	Toronto Marlies	AHL	38	10	12	22	18	7	6	2	8	2
2022–23	Toronto Maple Leafs	NHL	37	5	8	13	18	—	—	—	—	—
2023–24	Toronto Marlies	AHL	11	6	4	10	4	—	—	—	—	—
2023–24	Toronto Maple Leafs	NHL	54	7	10	17	18	7	0	0	0	2
2024–25	Toronto Maple Leafs	NHL	68	7	12	19	27	12	0	1	1	4
2025–26	Tampa Bay Lightning	NHL	70	11	11	22	31	—	—	—	—	—
SHL totals			192	30	61	91	86	25	7	8	15	12
NHL totals			229	30	41	71	94	19	0	1	1	6

=== International ===
Year	Team	Event	Result	GP	G	A	Pts	PIM
2019	Sweden	WJC	5th	5	0	0	0	0
2021	Sweden	WC	9th	2	0	0	0	0
2022	Sweden	OG	4th	6	0	2	2	0
2024	Sweden	WC	3rd place, bronze medalist(s)	10	0	6	6	0
2026	Sweden	OG	7th	5	0	0	0	2
Junior totals				5	0	0	0	0
Senior totals				23	0	8	8	2

== Awards and honours ==
Award	Year
SHL
Le Mat Trophy (Växjö Lakers)	2021
Stefan Liv Memorial Trophy	2021
