= Adam Edström =

Swedish ice hockey player (born 2000)

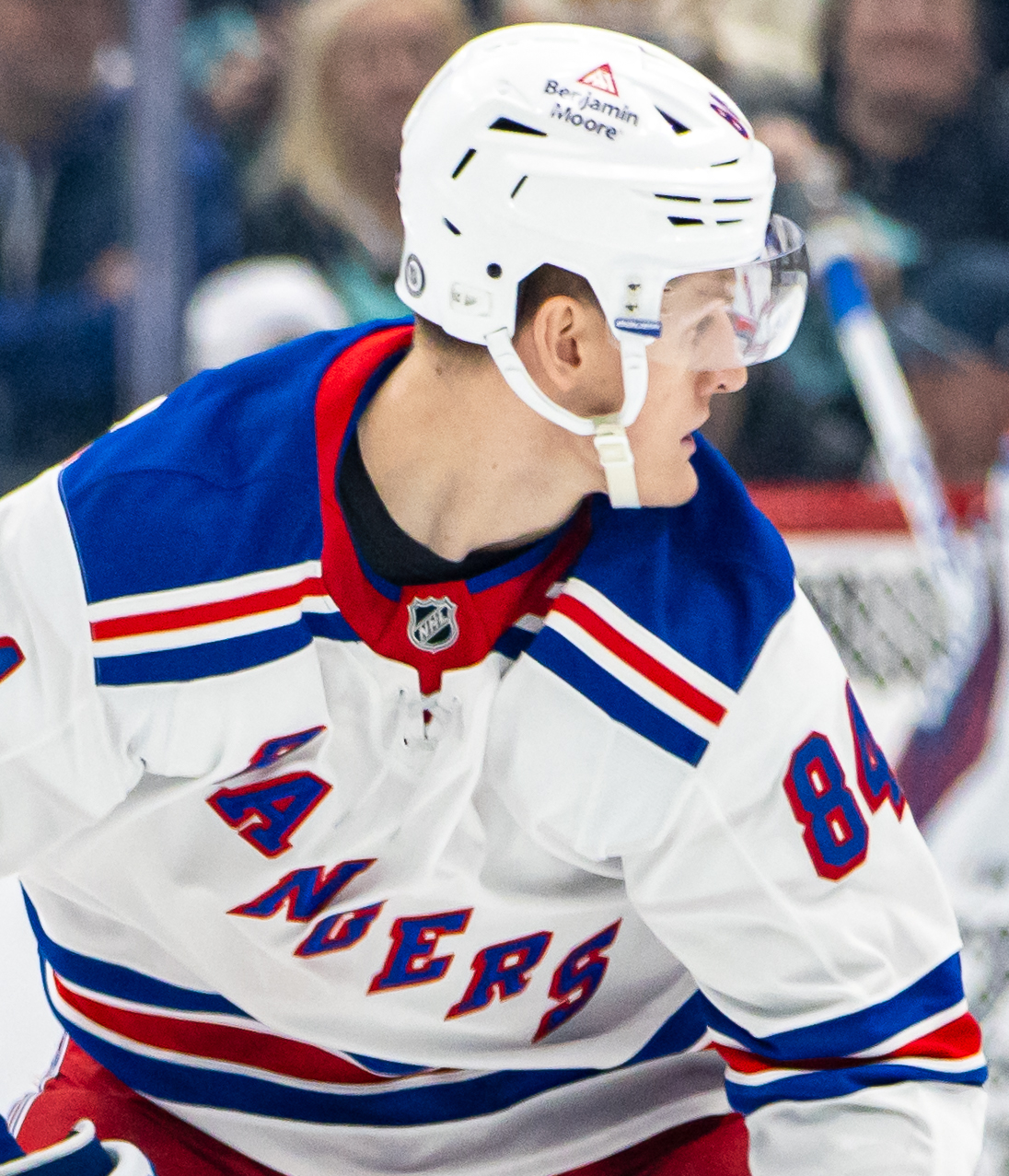
- Edström with the New York Rangers in 2024
- Born: 12 October 2000 (age 26) Karlstad, Sweden
- Height: 6 ft 6 in (198 cm)
- Weight: 241 lb (109 kg; 17 st 3 lb)
- Position: Forward
- Shoots: Left
- NHL team Former teams: Nashville Predators; Mora IK; Rögle BK; New York Rangers
- NHL draft: 161st overall, 2019; New York Rangers
- Playing career: 2019–present

Adam Edström (born 12 October 2000) is a Swedish professional ice hockey player who is a forward for the Nashville Predators of the National Hockey League (NHL). He was selected by the New York Rangers in the sixth round of the 2019 NHL entry draft with the 161st pick of the draft.

== Playing career ==
In 2018–19 Edström split the season between Mora IK of the Swedish Hockey League (SHL) and its junior team in the J20 SuperElit. He registered one assist without scoring a goal in 15 games for Mora IK. Edström joined Rögle BK the following season and established himself in the SHL through three seasons with the club.

On 16 May 2022, Edström was signed by draft club, the New York Rangers, to a three-year, entry-level contract. He was on the Rangers' 2022–23 training camp roster but was returned to Rögle BK. After completing the 2022–23 season with Rögle BK he was assigned to the Rangers' American Hockey League (AHL) affiliate, the Hartford Wolf Pack.

Edström was called up to the Rangers on 28 November 2023, but was returned to Hartford later that day without playing a game. He made his NHL debut and scored his first NHL goal on 15 December, in a 5–1 win against the Anaheim Ducks. He was returned to Hartford after the game and was sidelined with an upper body injury shortly afterwards but was recalled to the Rangers on 11 February 2024. Edström referred to his NHL debut upon this recall, saying that "It was a big opportunity, and I think I capitalized on that opportunity the best that I could. Me being back here is a sign that I did something good, so I'm just going to keep going down that road."

After a strong training camp, Edström made the Rangers' opening day roster for the 2024–25 season.

Upon the conclusion of the 2025–26 season, and at the 2026 NHL entry draft, Edström was traded by the Rangers to the Nashville Predators in exchange for a fifth-round pick and Massimo Rizzo on 27 June 2026.

== Career statistics ==
			Regular season					Playoffs
Season	Team	League	GP	G	A	Pts	PIM	GP	G	A	Pts	PIM
2016–17	Mora IK	J20	28	2	1	3	6	—	—	—	—	—
2017–18	Mora IK	J20	21	6	2	8	10	—	—	—	—	—
2018–19	Mora IK	J20	20	11	5	16	12	—	—	—	—	—
2018–19	Mora IK	SHL	15	0	1	1	0	—	—	—	—	—
2018–19	Malungs IF	Div.1	2	2	0	2	0	—	—	—	—	—
2019–20	Rögle BK	J20	1	0	0	0	0	—	—	—	—	—
2019–20	Rögle BK	SHL	46	4	5	9	14	—	—	—	—	—
2020–21	Rögle BK	SHL	43	3	7	10	33	11	3	3	6	6
2021–22	Rögle BK	SHL	43	7	2	9	6	13	3	1	4	4
2022–23	Rögle BK	SHL	42	9	10	19	35	9	2	1	3	6
2022–23	Hartford Wolf Pack	AHL	3	1	0	1	0	5	0	1	1	2
2023–24	Hartford Wolf Pack	AHL	40	11	5	16	16	—	—	—	—	—
2023–24	New York Rangers	NHL	11	2	0	2	2	—	—	—	—	—
2024–25	New York Rangers	NHL	51	5	4	9	27	—	—	—	—	—
2025–26	New York Rangers	NHL	35	3	2	5	2	—	—	—	—	—
SHL totals			189	23	25	48	88	33	8	5	13	16
NHL totals			97	10	6	16	31	—	—	—	—	—
