= Nils Lundkvist =

Swedish ice hockey player (born 2000)

- Born: 27 July 2000 (age 26) Piteå, Sweden
- Height: 6 ft 1 in (185 cm)
- Weight: 194 lb (88 kg; 13 st 12 lb)
- Position: Defence
- Shoots: Right
- NHL team Former teams: Dallas Stars; Luleå HF; New York Rangers
- National team: Sweden
- NHL draft: 28th overall, 2018; New York Rangers
- Playing career: 2017–present

Nils Lundkvist (born 27 July 2000) is a Swedish professional ice hockey player who is a defenceman for the Dallas Stars of the National Hockey League (NHL). Lundkvist was selected in the first round, 28th overall, of the 2018 NHL entry draft by the New York Rangers.

After two impressive seasons in the Swedish Hockey League (SHL) with Luleå HF, Lundkvist made his NHL debut in 2021 with the Rangers. During the following season, he was traded to the Dallas Stars.

== Playing career ==
Lundkvist played as a youth within the Luleå HF organization of the Swedish Hockey League. He made his professional debut as a 17-year-old in the 2017–18 season.

Lundkvist recorded a breakout year in the 2019–20 season with Luleå HF, recording 11 goals and 20 assists for 31 points through 45 games in finishing with the most assists and points as a junior in the league.

In his fourth season in the SHL in 2020–21, Lundkvist, having evolved into a top pairing blueliner, recorded 14 goals and 18 assists for 32 points in 52 games for the team. He led all defencemen in goals and power-play goals, and his 14 goals were the most goals recorded by a defenceman under 21 in SHL history. Following a postseason exit after seven playoff games, he was awarded the Salming Trophy as the league's best defenceman.

On 3 June 2021, Lundkvist was signed by the New York Rangers, to a three-year, entry-level contract. On 11 October, the Rangers awarded Lundkvist with the Lars-Erik Sjöberg Award, which is given to best rookie in training camp. Remaining on the Rangers roster to open the 2021–22 season, Lundkvist later scored his first NHL goal on 8 December 2021, at Madison Square Garden against the Colorado Avalanche.

On 19 September 2022, Lundkvist was traded to the Dallas Stars in exchange for a conditional 2023 first-round pick and a conditional 2025 fourth-round pick.

== Career statistics ==
=== Regular season and playoffs ===
			Regular season					Playoffs
Season	Team	League	GP	G	A	Pts	PIM	GP	G	A	Pts	PIM
2016–17	Luleå HF	J20	8	0	2	2	0	3	0	0	0	0
2017–18	Luleå HF	J20	26	3	11	14	18	6	0	5	5	6
2017–18	Luleå HF	SHL	28	2	3	5	0	2	0	0	0	0
2018–19	Luleå HF	J20	4	0	2	2	0	2	1	3	4	4
2018–19	Luleå HF	SHL	41	3	7	10	8	7	1	0	1	2
2019–20	Luleå HF	SHL	45	11	20	31	30	—	—	—	—	—
2020–21	Luleå HF	SHL	52	14	18	32	30	7	2	0	2	4
2021–22	New York Rangers	NHL	25	1	3	4	0	—	—	—	—	—
2021–22	Hartford Wolf Pack	AHL	34	3	12	15	14	—	—	—	—	—
2022–23	Dallas Stars	NHL	60	6	10	16	26	—	—	—	—	—
2023–24	Dallas Stars	NHL	59	2	17	19	16	12	0	1	1	2
2024–25	Dallas Stars	NHL	39	0	5	5	20	—	—	—	—	—
2025–26	Dallas Stars	NHL	52	3	8	11	16	4	0	2	2	2
SHL totals			166	30	50	80	68	16	3	0	3	6
NHL totals			235	12	43	55	78	16	0	3	3	4

Medal record

Representing Sweden

Ice hockey

World Junior Championships
Bronze medal – third place	2020 Czech Republic	

IIHF World U18 Championship
Bronze medal – third place	2018 Russia	

=== International ===
Year	Team	Event	Result	GP	G	A	Pts	PIM
2018	Sweden	U18	3rd place, bronze medalist(s)	7	0	2	2	2
2019	Sweden	WJC	5th	5	1	1	2	0
2020	Sweden	WJC	3rd place, bronze medalist(s)	7	1	7	8	4
2021	Sweden	WC	9th	3	0	5	5	2
Junior totals				19	2	10	12	6
Senior totals				3	0	5	5	2

== Awards and honors ==
Award	Year
J20
Best defenceman	2018
SHL
Salming Trophy	2021

Awards and achievements
Preceded by K'Andre Miller	New York Rangers first-round draft pick 2018	Succeeded by Kaapo Kakko
