= Nick Ebert =

American ice hockey player (born 1994)

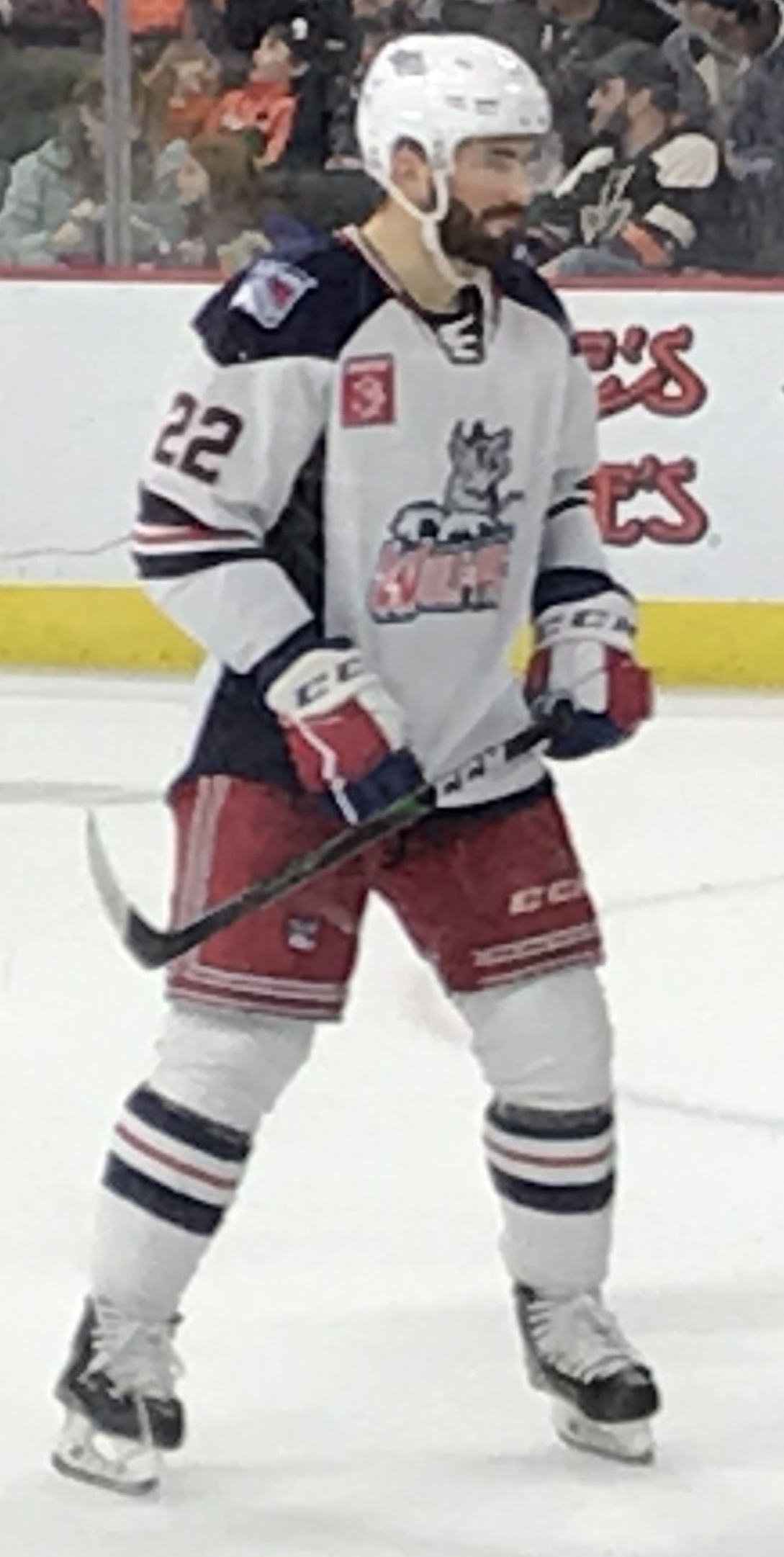
- Ebert with the Hartford Wolf Pack in 2019
- Born: May 11, 1994 (age 32) Livingston, New Jersey, U.S.
- Height: 6 ft 1 in (185 cm)
- Weight: 205 lb (93 kg; 14 st 9 lb)
- Position: Defense
- Shoots: Right
- team Former teams: Free agent Ontario Reign; Manchester Monarchs; Texas Stars; Örebro HK; Belleville Senators; Hartford Wolf Pack; HC Slovan Bratislava; Avtomobilist Yekaterinburg; CSKA Moscow
- NHL draft: 211th overall, 2012; Los Angeles Kings
- Playing career: 2013–present

Nick Ebert (born May 11, 1994) is an American professional ice hockey defenseman who is currently an unrestricted free agent. He was drafted in the seventh round, 211th overall, in the 2012 NHL entry draft by the Los Angeles Kings, making him the last pick in the draft.

== Playing career ==
=== Junior ===
Ebert was drafted in the first round, 17th overall, by the Windsor Spitfires in the 2010 OHL Draft. Ebert was named to the OHL First All-Rookie Team at the conclusion of the 2010–2011 season. Originally considered to be a top draft pick, a poor sophomore season led to Ebert dropping to the seventh round of the 2012 NHL entry draft where he was picked by the Los Angeles Kings as the last pick in the draft. On December 3, 2013, he was traded to the Guelph Storm along with captain Kerby Rychel in exchange for Brody Milne and eight OHL Draft picks. Ebert was assigned to the Ontario Reign after the conclusion of the 2012–13 OHL season to help them compete in the playoffs. Ebert was returned to the OHL for the following season where he helped Storm win the J. Ross Robertson Cup as OHL Champions.

=== Professional ===
Ebert signed a three-year entry-level contract with the Kings on May 28, 2014. He won the Calder Cup with the Manchester Monarchs the following season. In June 2016, Ebert was traded by the Los Angeles Kings to the Dallas Stars in exchange for Jack Campbell.

In the 2016–17 season, after attending the Dallas Stars training camp, Ebert was assigned for the duration of the year to AHL affiliate, the Texas Stars. In solidifying a top-four role on the blueline with Texas, Ebert produced a career-best 9 goals and 16 assists for 25 points in 68 games.

As an un-signed free agent over the summer, Ebert paused his North American career by agreeing to sign with HC Slovan Bratislava of the Kontinental Hockey League (KHL) on August 7, 2017.

In February 2018, Ebert extended his European career by leaving out-of-contention Bratislava after 44 games to sign with Örebro HK of the Swedish Hockey League (SHL). In his first full season with Örebro in 2018–19, he led the team in average time-on-ice and with 33 points in 49 games. His 33 points ranked fourth among league defenseman.

In June 2019, Ebert, with hopes of revitalizing his North American professional hockey career, used his NHL out-clause to secure his release from Örbero in signing a one-year, two-way contract with the Ottawa Senators of the NHL.

After participating in the Senators training camp, Ebert was reassigned to begin the 2019–20 season with AHL affiliate, the Belleville Senators. After just one game in Belleville, on October 7, 2019, Ebert was traded by the Senators, along with a fourth-round pick in the 2021 NHL entry draft, to the New York Rangers in exchange for Russian forward Vladislav Namestnikov. Ebert played out the remainder of the season in the AHL with the Hartford Wolf Pack, compiling 5 goals and 16 points in 46 games before the season was cancelled due to the COVID-19 pandemic.

As an impending free agent from the Rangers, Ebert opted to return to Sweden and rejoin his former club, Örebro HK of the SHL, on a two-year contract on June 24, 2020.

Following the conclusion of his contract in the SHL, Ebert opted to continue his career abroad in signing a two-year contract with Russian club, Avtomobilist Yekaterinburg of the Kontinental Hockey League (KHL) on July 5, 2022.

== Career statistics ==
			Regular season					Playoffs
Season	Team	League	GP	G	A	Pts	PIM	GP	G	A	Pts	PIM
2009–10	Waterloo Black Hawks	USHL	53	6	12	18	26	3	1	0	1	0
2010–11	Windsor Spitfires	OHL	64	11	30	41	44	18	1	2	3	6
2011–12	Windsor Spitfires	OHL	66	6	33	39	58	4	0	2	2	8
2012–13	Windsor Spitfires	OHL	68	11	27	38	58	—	—	—	—	—
2012–13	Ontario Reign	ECHL	4	0	3	3	2	10	2	5	7	0
2013–14	Windsor Spitfires	OHL	27	4	16	20	18	—	—	—	—	—
2013–14	Guelph Storm	OHL	38	9	24	33	31	20	5	11	16	8
2014–15	Manchester Monarchs	AHL	45	8	6	14	18	2	0	0	0	0
2015–16	Ontario Reign	AHL	44	2	10	12	28	4	0	0	0	2
2016–17	Texas Stars	AHL	68	9	16	25	40	—	—	—	—	—
2017–18	HC Slovan Bratislava	KHL	44	7	12	19	34	—	—	—	—	—
2017–18	Örebro HK	SHL	7	2	1	3	8	—	—	—	—	—
2018–19	Örebro HK	SHL	49	11	22	33	46	2	1	0	1	2
2019–20	Belleville Senators	AHL	1	0	0	0	0	—	—	—	—	—
2019–20	Hartford Wolf Pack	AHL	46	5	11	16	27	—	—	—	—	—
2020–21	Örebro HK	SHL	19	4	7	11	10	9	3	2	5	2
2021–22	Örebro HK	SHL	49	9	23	32	32	6	0	1	1	9
2022–23	Avtomobilist Yekaterinburg	KHL	62	11	30	41	70	7	5	3	8	2
2023–24	Avtomobilist Yekaterinburg	KHL	31	4	7	11	4	13	2	3	5	10
2024–25	Avtomobilist Yekaterinburg	KHL	37	7	8	15	23	6	1	1	2	6
2025–26	CSKA Moscow	KHL	6	2	1	3	0	9	1	1	2	0
KHL totals			180	31	58	89	131	35	9	8	17	18
SHL totals			124	26	53	79	96	17	4	3	7	13

== Awards and honors ==
Award	Year
OHL
First All-Rookie Team	2011
CHL Top Prospects Game	2012
J. Ross Robertson Cup champion	2014
AHL
Calder Cup champion	2015
