= Richard Gynge =

Swedish ice hockey player (born 1987)

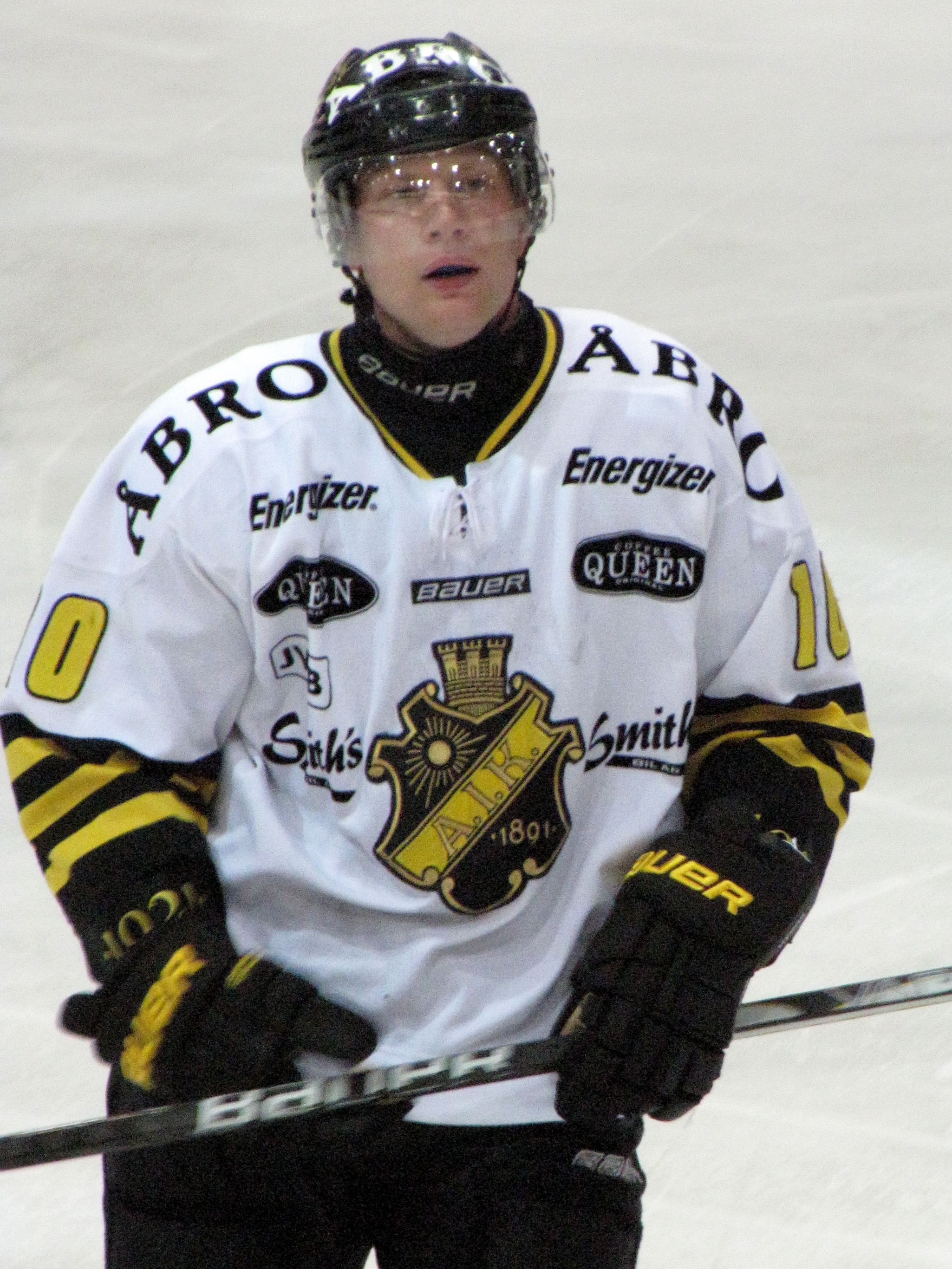
- Richard Gynge playing a preseason game for AIK against Ilves in August 2011.
- Born: 1 February 1987 (age 38); Tyresö, Sweden
- Height: 6 ft 1 in (185 cm)
- Weight: 196 lb (89 kg; 14 st 0 lb)
- Position: Center
- Shot: Right
- Played for: Brynäs IF; AIK; Dynamo Moscow; HC Lev Praha; Admiral Vladivostok; Växjö Lakers; Neftekhimik Nizhnekamsk; Traktor Chelyabinsk
- Playing career: 2006–2024

Richard Gynge (born 1 February 1987 in Tyresö) is a Swedish former professional ice hockey player, He represented Brynäs IF, AIK IF and Växjö Lakers of the Swedish Hockey League (SHL), and HC Dynamo Moscow, HC Lev Praha, Admiral Vladivostok, HC Neftekhimik Nizhnekamsk and Traktor Chelyabinsk of the Kontinental Hockey League (KHL).

After two seasons with Traktor Chelyabinsk, Gynge opted to return to his native Sweden as a free agent, signing for a second stint with the Växjö Lakers in agreeing to a three-year contract on 23 July 2019.

== Career statistics ==
			Regular season					Playoffs
Season	Team	League	GP	G	A	Pts	PIM	GP	G	A	Pts	PIM
2003–04	Hammarby IF	J18 Allsv	1	0	1	1	2	—	—	—	—	—
2003–04	Hammarby IF	J20	27	8	9	17	8	1	0	0	0	0
2004–05	Hammarby IF	J18	3	4	3	7		—	—	—	—	—
2004–05	Hammarby IF	J20	30	15	18	33	24	—	—	—	—	—
2005–06	Hammarby IF	J20	39	31	39	70	90	2	2	3	5	2
2005–06	Hammarby IF	Allsv	6	0	0	0	0	—	—	—	—	—
2006–07	Brynäs IF	J20	3	3	2	5	6	—	—	—	—	—
2006–07	Brynäs IF	SEL	3	0	0	0	0	—	—	—	—	—
2006–07	Nybro Vikings IF	Allsv	37	21	18	39	65	—	—	—	—	—
2007–08	Brynäs IF	J20	7	5	6	11	4	—	—	—	—	—
2007–08	Brynäs IF	SEL	1	0	0	0	0	—	—	—	—	—
2007–08	VIK Västerås HK	Allsv	17	1	6	7	12	—	—	—	—	—
2007–08	IK Oskarshamn	Allsv	10	1	2	3	6	—	—	—	—	—
2008–09	IK Oskarshamn	Allsv	44	17	24	41	44	—	—	—	—	—
2009–10	AIK	Allsv	51	28	24	52	16	10	4	1	5	0
2010–11	AIK	SEL	51	12	11	23	22	8	0	1	1	2
2011–12	AIK	SEL	55	28	16	44	14	12	1	1	2	8
2012–13	Dynamo Moscow	KHL	29	10	4	14	10	—	—	—	—	—
2012–13	HC Lev Praha	KHL	7	2	2	4	6	2	0	0	0	0
2013–14	Admiral Vladivostok	KHL	48	9	10	19	16	5	0	3	3	2
2014–15	Admiral Vladivostok	KHL	53	18	16	34	32	—	—	—	—	—
2015–16	Växjö Lakers	SHL	46	21	23	44	24	13	5	7	12	6
2016–17	Neftekhimik Nizhnekamsk	KHL	57	24	16	40	24	—	—	—	—	—
2017–18	Traktor Chelyabinsk	KHL	49	14	18	32	16	16	8	8	16	6
2018–19	Traktor Chelyabinsk	KHL	11	2	3	5	6	—	—	—	—	—
2019–20	Växjö Lakers	SHL	44	11	13	24	47	—	—	—	—	—
2020–21	Växjö Lakers	SHL	49	17	15	32	14	14	5	5	10	0
2021–22	Växjö Lakers	SHL	52	23	25	48	6	4	5	2	7	0
2022–23	AIK	Allsv	47	20	20	40	12	3	2	1	3	0
2023–24	AIK	Allsv	49	22	31	53	36	6	2	4	6	2
SHL totals			301	112	103	215	127	51	16	16	32	16
KHL totals			254	79	69	148	110	23	8	11	19	8

== Awards and honours ==
Award	Year
SHL
Håkan Loob Trophy	2012
Le Mat Trophy (Växjö Lakers)	2021

Awards and achievements
Preceded by Mikko Lehtonen	Winner of the Håkan Loob Trophy; 2012	Succeeded by Carl Söderberg
