= Tom Wandell =

Swedish ice hockey player (born 1987)

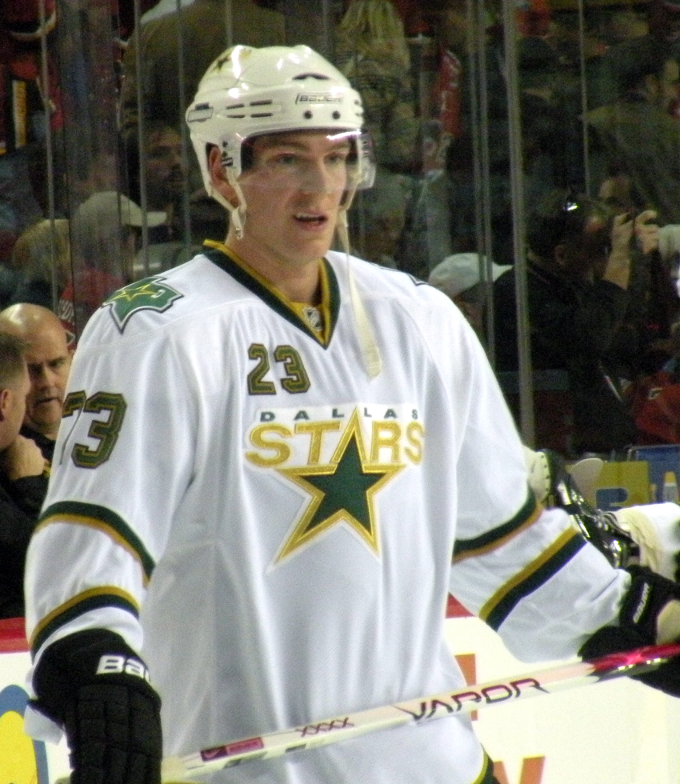
- Born: January 29, 1987 (age 39) Södertälje, Sweden
- Height: 6 ft 0 in (183 cm)
- Weight: 180 lb (82 kg; 12 st 12 lb)
- Position: Centre
- Shoots: Left
- team Former teams: Free Agent; Södertälje SK; Ässät; Timrå IK; Dallas Stars; Severstal Cherepovets; Spartak Moscow; Avangard Omsk; Admiral Vladivostok; Amur Khabarovsk; Örebro HK; Djurgårdens IF; Brynäs IF
- NHL draft: 146th overall, 2005; Dallas Stars
- Playing career: 2006–present

Tom Wandell (born January 29, 1987) is a former Swedish professional ice hockey forward. He most recently played with Brynäs IF in the Swedish Hockey League (SHL).

== Playing career ==
Wandell was drafted whilst with the youth team of Södertälje SK in the 5th round, 146th overall, by the Dallas Stars in the 2005 NHL entry draft. He made his debut in Sweden's top-flight SHL during the 2005–06 season. The 2006-07 campaign saw Wandell spend time with Ässät of the Finnish Liiga, before heading to North America, where he played in 53 games for AHL's Iowa Stars in 2007–08.

In 2008–09, he made his NHL debut with the Dallas Stars, but mostly played for Timrå IK of the SHL. He also recorded his first career National Hockey League goal with the Stars on December 12, 2008, in only his second NHL game, by scoring in a 3–1 victory over the Detroit Red Wings.

After six seasons within the Dallas Stars organization, Wandell left to sign a two-year contract in Russia with HC Spartak Moscow of the Kontinental Hockey League on May 3, 2013. In 2014–15, he split time between Avangard Omsk and Admiral Vladivostok.

Before the 2015–16 season, Wandell was traded by Admiral Vladivostok, in one of the largest trades in KHL history, to Amur Khabarovsk on June 15, 2015. He made 55 appearances for Amur, tallying four goals and twelve assists. He left the club after the season and signed a two-year deal with Örebro HK of the Swedish Hockey League in May 2016.

After three years with Örebro HK, Wandell left as a free agent following the 2018–19 season. On May 10, 2019, he agreed to a one-year contract with his fourth SHL club, Djurgårdens IF.

== Career statistics ==
=== Regular season and playoffs ===
			Regular season					Playoffs
Season	Team	League	GP	G	A	Pts	PIM	GP	G	A	Pts	PIM
2002–03	Södertälje SK	J18 Allsv	13	8	7	15	6	—	—	—	—	—
2003–04	Södertälje SK	J18 Allsv	6	5	7	12	6	2	0	0	0	0
2003–04	Södertälje SK	J20	33	7	15	22	14	2	0	0	0	0
2004–05	Södertälje SK	J20	5	1	2	3	4	—	—	—	—	—
2005–06	Södertälje SK	J20	41	19	20	39	45	4	1	0	1	2
2005–06	Södertälje SK	SEL	6	0	0	0	0	—	—	—	—	—
2006–07	Ässät	SM-l	50	6	6	12	20	—	—	—	—	—
2007–08	Iowa Stars	AHL	53	10	9	19	16	—	—	—	—	—
2007–08	Idaho Steelheads	ECHL	3	3	0	3	2	—	—	—	—	—
2008–09	Timrå IK	SEL	51	15	26	41	26	7	0	4	4	0
2008–09	Dallas Stars	NHL	14	1	2	3	4	—	—	—	—	—
2009–10	Dallas Stars	NHL	50	5	10	15	14	—	—	—	—	—
2010–11	Dallas Stars	NHL	75	7	2	9	14	—	—	—	—	—
2011–12	Dallas Stars	NHL	72	6	9	15	16	—	—	—	—	—
2012–13	Severstal Cherepovets	KHL	26	2	7	9	18	—	—	—	—	—
2012–13	Dallas Stars	NHL	18	1	0	1	4	—	—	—	—	—
2012–13	Texas Stars	AHL	11	0	4	4	4	—	—	—	—	—
2013–14	Spartak Moscow	KHL	50	5	9	14	26	—	—	—	—	—
2014–15	Avangard Omsk	KHL	38	2	8	10	18	—	—	—	—	—
2014–15	Admiral Vladivostok	KHL	19	5	5	10	2	—	—	—	—	—
2015–16	Amur Khabarovsk	KHL	55	4	12	16	24	—	—	—	—	—
2016–17	Örebro HK	SHL	52	5	8	13	16	—	—	—	—	—
2017–18	Örebro HK	SHL	52	13	13	26	22	—	—	—	—	—
2018–19	Örebro HK	SHL	49	5	12	17	12	2	0	1	1	0
2019–20	Djurgårdens IF	SHL	48	4	8	12	12	—	—	—	—	—
2020–21	Djurgårdens IF	SHL	43	6	4	10	10	3	0	0	0	0
2021–22	Brynäs IF	SHL	1	0	0	0	2	—	—	—	—	—
SHL totals			302	48	71	119	100	12	0	5	5	0
NHL totals			229	20	23	43	52	—	—	—	—	—
KHL totals			188	18	41	59	88	—	—	—	—	—

=== International ===
Year	Team	Event	Result	GP	G	A	Pts	PIM
2004	Sweden	WJC18	5th	6	0	0	0	4
Junior totals				6	0	0	0	4
