= 2020–21 SHL season =

- League: Swedish Hockey League
- Sport: Ice hockey
- Duration: September 2020 – April 2021; (Regular season)

Regular season
- First place: Växjö Lakers
- Top scorer: Marek Hrivík (Leksands IF)
- Relegated to HockeyAllsvenskan: HV71

Playoffs
- Playoffs MVP: Pontus Holmberg (Växjö Lakers)
- Finals champions: Växjö Lakers
- Runners-up: Rögle BK

SHL seasons
- 2019–20 2021–22

The 2020–21 SHL season was the 46th season of the Swedish Hockey League (SHL). The regular season began in September 2020 and ended on 3 April 2021, and it was then followed by the playoffs and the relegation playoffs. The league consisted of the 14 teams that competed in the 2019–20 season; because of the COVID-19 pandemic in Sweden, no relegation or promotion took place after the previous season. The Växjö Lakers won the regular season for the third time in club history. In the SHL qualifier, Brynäs IF defeated HV71 in five games to stay in the SHL. The Växjö Lakers won the Le Mat Trophy for the third time, defeating Rögle BK by 4 games to 1 in the playoffs final.

Due to the COVID-19 pandemic in Sweden, many of the teams have had their players affected, causing many regular season games to be moved forward and the end of the regular season to be postponed multiple times.

== Teams ==
SHL team map

| Team | City | Arena | Capacity |
|---|---|---|---|
| Brynäs IF | Gävle | Monitor ERP Arena | 7,909 |
| Djurgårdens IF | Stockholm | Hovet | 8,094 |
| Frölunda HC | Gothenburg | Scandinavium | 12,044 |
| Färjestad BK | Karlstad | Löfbergs Arena | 8,647 |
| HV71 | Jönköping | Husqvarna Garden | 7,000 |
| Leksands IF | Leksand | Tegera Arena | 7,650 |
| Linköping HC | Linköping | Saab Arena | 8,500 |
| Luleå HF | Luleå | Coop Norrbotten Arena | 6,300 |
| Malmö Redhawks | Malmö | Malmö Arena | 13,000 |
| IK Oskarshamn | Oskarshamn | Be-Ge Hockey Center | 3,275 |
| Rögle BK | Ängelholm | Catena Arena | 5,150 |
| Skellefteå AIK | Skellefteå | Skellefteå Kraft Arena | 6,001 |
| Växjö Lakers | Växjö | Vida Arena | 5,700 |
| Örebro HK | Örebro | Behrn Arena | 5,150 |

== Regular season ==
Each team played 52 games, playing each of the other thirteen teams four times: twice on home ice, and twice away from home. Points were awarded for each game, where three points were awarded for winning in regulation time, two points for winning in overtime or shootout, one point for losing in overtime or shootout, and zero points for losing in regulation time. At the end of the regular season, the team that finished with the most points was crowned the league champion.

=== Standings ===
| Pos | Team | Pld | W | OTW | OTL | L | GF | GA | GD | Pts | Qualification |
|---|---|---|---|---|---|---|---|---|---|---|---|
| 1 | Växjö Lakers | 52 | 27 | 7 | 7 | 11 | 153 | 112 | +41 | 102 | Qualification to Quarter-finals |
| 2 | Rögle BK | 52 | 27 | 4 | 9 | 12 | 164 | 124 | +40 | 98 | Qualification to Quarter-finals |
| 3 | Leksands IF | 52 | 25 | 7 | 5 | 15 | 156 | 134 | +22 | 94 | Qualification to Quarter-finals |
| 4 | Skellefteå AIK | 52 | 24 | 8 | 5 | 15 | 154 | 122 | +32 | 93 | Qualification to Quarter-finals |
| 5 | Luleå HF | 52 | 24 | 4 | 8 | 16 | 150 | 131 | +19 | 88 | Qualification to Quarter-finals |
| 6 | Örebro HK | 52 | 25 | 4 | 4 | 19 | 154 | 144 | +10 | 87 | Qualification to Quarter-finals |
| 7 | Frölunda HC | 52 | 27 | 1 | 1 | 23 | 133 | 131 | +2 | 84 | Qualification to Eighth-finals |
| 8 | Färjestad BK | 52 | 18 | 11 | 5 | 18 | 157 | 143 | +14 | 81 | Qualification to Eighth-finals |
| 9 | Malmö Redhawks | 52 | 19 | 4 | 2 | 27 | 123 | 151 | −28 | 67 | Qualification to Eighth-finals |
| 10 | Djurgårdens IF | 52 | 17 | 5 | 4 | 26 | 139 | 151 | −12 | 65 | Qualification to Eighth-finals |
| 11 | IK Oskarshamn | 52 | 18 | 2 | 5 | 27 | 142 | 163 | −21 | 63 | |
| 12 | Linköping HC | 52 | 17 | 4 | 3 | 28 | 132 | 166 | −34 | 62 | |
| 13 | Brynäs IF | 52 | 14 | 4 | 7 | 27 | 131 | 176 | −45 | 57 | Qualification to Play Out |
| 14 | HV71 (R) | 52 | 12 | 5 | 5 | 30 | 127 | 167 | −40 | 51 | Qualification to Play Out |

Source: SHL.se
Rules for classification: 1) Points; 2) Goal difference; 3) Number of goals scored
(R) Relegated

=== Statistics ===
==== Scoring leaders ====
The following shows the top ten players who led the league in points, at the conclusion of the regular season. If two or more skaters are tied (i.e. same number of points, goals and played games), all of the tied skaters are shown.

| Player | Team | GP | G | A | Pts | +/– | PIM |
|---|---|---|---|---|---|---|---|
| (Slovakia) Marek Hrivík | Leksands IF | 44 | 14 | 37 | 51 | +9 | 26 |
| (Sweden) Daniel Zaar | Rögle BK | 52 | 18 | 32 | 50 | +10 | 22 |
| (Sweden) Daniel Viksten | Färjestad BK | 51 | 25 | 23 | 48 | +10 | 2 |
| (Sweden) Emil Pettersson | Växjö Lakers | 52 | 22 | 26 | 48 | +10 | 20 |
| (United States) Carter Camper | Leksands IF | 46 | 14 | 32 | 46 | +6 | 8 |
| (Sweden) Simon Ryfors | Rögle BK | 51 | 25 | 20 | 45 | +12 | 53 |
| (Sweden) Jonatan Berggren | Skellefteå AIK | 49 | 12 | 33 | 45 | +11 | 18 |
| (Sweden) Joakim Lindström | Skellefteå AIK | 52 | 12 | 33 | 45 | +4 | 42 |
| (Sweden) Linus Klasen | Luleå HF | 50 | 14 | 28 | 42 | +5 | 43 |
| (Sweden) Jesper Frödén | Skellefteå AIK | 52 | 22 | 18 | 40 | +12 | 49 |

==== Leading goaltenders ====
The following shows the top ten goaltenders who led the league in goals against average, provided that they have played at least 40% of their team's minutes, at the conclusion of the regular season.

| Player | Team(s) | GP | TOI | W | T | L | GA | SO | Sv% | GAA |
|---|---|---|---|---|---|---|---|---|---|---|
| (Sweden) Viktor Fasth | Växjö Lakers | 31 | 1876:48 | 19 | 3 | 9 | 56 | 5 | 93.34 | 1.79 |
| (Sweden) Arvid Söderblom | Skellefteå AIK | 22 | 1298:34 | 12 | 2 | 7 | 44 | 4 | 92.18 | 2.03 |
| (Sweden) Christoffer Rifalk | Rögle BK | 33 | 1950:11 | 16 | 5 | 11 | 66 | 4 | 91.62 | 2.03 |
| (Sweden) Jesper Wallstedt | Luleå HF | 22 | 1316:55 | 11 | 3 | 8 | 49 | 2 | 90.77 | 2.23 |
| (Sweden) Gustaf Lindvall | Skellefteå AIK | 32 | 1835:39 | 19 | 1 | 11 | 71 | 2 | 91.99 | 2.32 |
| (Sweden) Oscar Alsenfelt | Malmö Redhawks | 41 | 2365:43 | 16 | 3 | 20 | 94 | 2 | 92.00 | 2.38 |
| (Finland) Janne Juvonen | Leksands IF | 50 | 2862:50 | 28 | 2 | 18 | 115 | 4 | 91.56 | 2.41 |
| (Sweden) Jhonas Enroth | Örebro HK | 32 | 1928:00 | 19 | 2 | 11 | 78 | 3 | 90.90 | 2.43 |
| (Sweden) Niklas Rubin | Frölunda HC | 33 | 1868:08 | 17 | 0 | 15 | 78 | 3 | 90.01 | 2.51 |
| (Norway) Henrik Haukeland | Färjestad BK | 31 | 1832:27 | 13 | 4 | 12 | 78 | 3 | 90.98 | 2.55 |
| (Lithuania) Mantas Armalis | Djurgårdens IF | 31 | 1791:38 | 15 | 1 | 13 | 76 | 1 | 90.97 | 2.55 |

== Playoffs ==
Ten teams qualify for the playoffs: the top six teams in the regular season have a bye to the quarterfinals, while teams ranked seventh to tenth meet each other (7 versus 10, 8 versus 9) in a preliminary playoff round.

=== Format ===
In the first round, the 7th-ranked team meets the 10th-ranked team and the 8th-ranked team meets the 9th-ranked team for a place in the second round. In the second round, the top-ranked team will meet the lowest-ranked winner of the first round, the 2nd-ranked team will face the other winner of the first round, the 3rd-ranked team will face the 6th-ranked team, and the 4th-ranked team will face the 5th-ranked team. In the third round, the highest remaining seed is matched against the lowest remaining seed. In each round the higher-seeded team is awarded home advantage. The meetings are in the first round played as best-of-three series, in the third round as best-of-five series and in the second and fourth rounds as best-of-seven series. In the eighth-finals, the higher-seeded teams play at home for game 2 (plus 3 if necessary) while the lower-seeded teams play at home for game 1. In the semi-finals, the higher-seeded teams are at home for games 1 and 2 (plus 5 if necessary) while the lower-seeded teams are at home for game 3 (plus 4 if necessary). In the quarter-finals and the finals, the higher-seeded teams are at home for games 1 and 2 (plus 5 and 7 if necessary) while the lower-seeded teams are at home for games 3 and 4 (plus 6 if necessary).

=== Playoff bracket ===
Eighth-finals; Swedish: Åttondelsfinal
7 | Frölunda HC | 2
10 | Djurgårdens IF | 1
8 | Färjestad BK | 2
9 | Malmö Redhawks | 0

Quarter-finals; Swedish: Kvartsfinal
1 | Växjö Lakers | 4
8 | Färjestad BK | 0
2 | Rögle BK | 4
7 | Frölunda HC | 0
3 | Leksands IF | 0
6 | Örebro HK | 4
4 | Skellefteå AIK | 4
5 | Luleå HF | 3

Semi-finals
1 | Växjö Lakers | 3
6 | Örebro HK | 2
(Pairings are re-seeded after the first and second round)
2 | Rögle BK | 3
4 | Skellefteå AIK | 2

Finals
1 | Växjö Lakers | 4
2 | Rögle BK | 1

=== Eighth-finals ===
==== (7) Frölunda HC vs. (10) Djurgårdens IF ====
| 5 April | Djurgårdens IF | 1–3 | Frölunda HC | Hovet | Recap |
| Tom Nilsson (1) – 2:07 | | First period | No scoring |
| No scoring | | Second period | 7:59 – Mats Rosseli Olsen (1); 19:59 – Stefan Elliott (1; PPG) |
| No scoring | | Third period | 19:00 – Nicklas Lasu (1; SHG/ENG) |
| Mantas Armalis (35 shots / 33 saves) | | Goalie stats | Johan Mattsson (19 shots / 18 saves) |

| 7 April | Frölunda HC | 2–7 | Djurgårdens IF | Scandinavium | Recap |
| No scoring | | First period | 0:44 – Manuel Ågren (1); 16:12 – Rhett Rakhshani (1; PPG) |
| Mattias Norlinder (1) – 11:07; Mattias Norlinder (2; PPG) – 17:41 | | Second period | 2:14 – Alexander Holtz (1); 8:14 – William Eklund (1); 10:31 – Sebastian Strandberg (1); 15:07 – Alexander Holtz (2) |
| No scoring | | Third period | 16:31 – Sebastian Strandberg (2; PPG) |
| Johan Mattsson (16 shots / 12 saves); Niklas Rubin (14 shots / 11 saves) | | Goalie stats | Mantas Armalis (34 shots / 32 saves) |

| 8 April | Frölunda HC | 4–0 | Djurgårdens IF | Scandinavium | Recap |
| No scoring | | First period | No scoring |
| Christoffer Ehn (1) – 7:57 | | Second period | No scoring |
| Jan Muršak (1) – 4:35; Mats Rosseli Olsen (2; ENG) – 16:35; Johan Sundström (1; ENG) – 17:59 | | Third period | No scoring |
| Johan Mattsson (26 shots / 26 saves) | | Goalie stats | Mantas Armalis (22 shots / 20 saves) |

| Frölunda HC win series 2–1 |

==== (8) Färjestad BK vs. (9) Malmö Redhawks ====
| 5 April | Malmö Redhawks | 1–3 | Färjestad BK | Malmö Arena | Recap |
| No scoring | | First period | 3:06 – Jacob Peterson (1; PPG); 9:33 – Niclas Lundgren (1) |
| Matt Puempel (1) – 8:34 | | Second period | No scoring |
| No scoring | | Third period | 18:55 – Martin Johansson (1; ENG) |
| Oscar Alsenfelt (23 shots / 21 saves) | | Goalie stats | Henrik Haukeland (29 shots / 28 saves) |

| 7 April | Färjestad BK | 5–4 | OT | Malmö Redhawks | Löfbergs Arena | Recap |
| Per Åslund (1) – 9:05; Daniel Viksten (1) – 13:30 | | First period | | 5:41 – Matias Lassen (1); 9:32 – Ponthus Westerholm (1) |
| Michael Lindqvist (1) – 3:47 | | Second period | | No scoring |
| Per Åslund (2; EA) – 19:38 | | Third period | | 5:29 – Carl Persson (1); 10:40 – Matias Lassen (2) |
| Oskar Bäck (1) – 5:42 | | First overtime period | | No scoring |
| Henrik Haukeland (30 shots / 26 saves) | | Goalie stats | | Oscar Alsenfelt (32 shots / 27 saves) |

| Färjestad BK win series 2–0 |

=== Quarter-finals ===
==== (1) Växjö Lakers vs. (8) Färjestad BK ====
| 10 April | Växjö Lakers | 4–3 | OT | Färjestad BK | Vida Arena | Recap |
| Miika Koivisto (1) – 0:26; Robert Rosén (1) – 2:54 | | First period | | 15:21 – Olle Lycksell (1); 17:08 – Victor Ejdsell (1; PPG) |
| No scoring | | Second period | | No scoring |
| Ilari Melart (1; PPG) – 5:27 | | Third period | | 14:23 – Per Åslund (3) |
| Fredrik Karlström (1) – 5:24 | | First overtime period | | No scoring |
| Viktor Fasth (42 shots / 39 saves) | | Goalie stats | | Henrik Haukeland (32 shots / 28 saves) |

| 11 April | Växjö Lakers | 5–4 | Färjestad BK | Vida Arena | Recap |
| No scoring | | First period | 4:34 – Per Åslund (4; PPG) |
| Richard Gynge (1) – 10:23; Miika Koivisto (2; PPG) – 12:35; Marcus Sylvegård (1) – 13:43 | | Second period | 0:22 – Carl Jakobsson (1); 7:01 – Jonathon Blum (1; PPG) |
| Robert Rosén (2; PPG) – 16:19; Pontus Holmberg (1) – 16:49 | | Third period | 12:05 – Jens Westin (1) |
| Viktor Fasth (27 shots / 23 saves) | | Goalie stats | Henrik Haukeland (28 shots / 23 saves) |

| 13 April | Färjestad BK | 0–3 | Växjö Lakers | Löfbergs Arena | Recap |
| No scoring | | First period | 16:21 – Fredrik Karlström (2) |
| No scoring | | Second period | No scoring |
| No scoring | | Third period | 0:58 – Jack Drury (1); 6:00 – Robert Rosén (3) |
| Arvid Holm (27 shots / 24 saves) | | Goalie stats | Viktor Fasth (30 shots / 30 saves) |

| 14 April | Färjestad BK | 3–4 | 2OT | Växjö Lakers | Löfbergs Arena | Recap |
| Pontus Widerström (1) – 6:22 | | First period | | 12:01 – Emil Pettersson (1; PPG); 18:10 – Pontus Holmberg (2) |
| Pontus Widerström (2) – 2:34; Per Åslund (5; PPG) – 10:08 | | Second period | | 1:50 – Fredrik Karlström (3) |
| No scoring | | Third period | | No scoring |
| No scoring | | Second overtime period | | 14:50 – Fredrik Karlström (4) |
| Arvid Holm (52 shots / 48 saves) | | Goalie stats | | Viktor Fasth (31 shots / 28 saves) |

| Växjö Lakers win series 4–0 |

==== (2) Rögle BK vs. (7) Frölunda HC ====
| 10 April | Rögle BK | 4–0 | Frölunda HC | Catena Arena | Recap |
| No scoring | | First period | No scoring |
| Taylor Matson (1; SHG) – 9:01; Simon Ryfors (1; PPG) – 16:39 | | Second period | No scoring |
| Anton Bengtsson (1) – 4:00; Adam Tambellini (1; ENG) – 17:45 | | Third period | No scoring |
| Christoffer Rifalk (16 shots / 16 saves) | | Goalie stats | Johan Mattsson (24 shots / 21 saves) |

| 11 April | Rögle BK | 5–2 | Frölunda HC | Catena Arena | Recap |
| No scoring | | First period | No scoring |
| Daniel Zaar (1) – 0:53; Niklas Hansson (1; PPG) – 10:41 | | Second period | 9:04 – Robin Álvarez (1) |
| Éric Gélinas (1) – 0:57; Adam Tambellini (2) – 4:29; Erlend Lesund (1; ENG) – 18:43 | | Third period | 17:09 – Jan Muršak (2) |
| Christoffer Rifalk (24 shots / 22 saves) | | Goalie stats | Johan Mattsson (25 shots / 21 saves) |

| 13 April | Frölunda HC | 0–5 | Rögle BK | Scandinavium | Recap |
| No scoring | | First period | 5:23 – Mattias Sjögren (1); 11:41 – Olli Palola (1; PPG); 13:16 – Dennis Everberg (1) |
| No scoring | | Second period | 15:29 – Adam Edström (1) |
| No scoring | | Third period | 18:48 – Daniel Zaar (2; PPG) |
| Johan Mattsson (10 shots / 7 saves); Niklas Rubin (21 shots / 19 saves) | | Goalie stats | Christoffer Rifalk (20 shots / 20 saves) |

| 14 April | Frölunda HC | 1–6 | Rögle BK | Scandinavium | Recap |
| No scoring | | First period | 11:33 – Adam Edström (2); 16:15 – Olli Palola (2) |
| Mattias Norlinder (3; PPG) – 3:56 | | Second period | 8:46 – Niklas Hansson (2); 11:56 – Daniel Zaar (3; PPG) |
| No scoring | | Third period | 13:09 – Adam Tambellini (3; ENG); 16:21 – Ted Brithén (1; PPG) |
| Niklas Rubin (26 shots / 21 saves) | | Goalie stats | Christoffer Rifalk (28 shots / 27 saves) |

| Rögle BK win series 4–0 |

==== (3) Leksands IF vs. (6) Örebro HK ====
| 11 April | Leksands IF | 1–6 | Örebro HK | Tegera Arena | Recap |
| Carter Ashton (1; PPG) – 16:29 | | First period | 6:04 – Linus Öberg (1) |
| No scoring | | Second period | 0:33 – Kristian Näkyvä (1); 12:32 – Borna Rendulić (1) |
| No scoring | | Third period | 6:26 – Emil Larsson (1); 9:27 – Rodrigo Ābols (1; ENG); 18:46 – Rodrigo Ābols (2; PPG) |
| Janne Juvonen (24 shots / 19 saves) | | Goalie stats | Jhonas Enroth (18 shots / 17 saves) |

| 12 April | Leksands IF | 1–2 | Örebro HK | Tegera Arena | Recap |
| No scoring | | First period | No scoring |
| Patrik Zackrisson (1; PPG) – 11:21 | | Second period | 0:56 – Rodrigo Ābols (3; PPG); 19:30 – Borna Rendulić (2) |
| No scoring | | Third period | No scoring |
| Janne Juvonen (16 shots / 14 saves) | | Goalie stats | Jhonas Enroth (29 shots / 28 saves) |

| 14 April | Örebro HK | 7–1 | Leksands IF | Behrn Arena | Recap |
| Emil Larsson (2) – 17:59 | | First period | No scoring |
| Oliver Eklind (1) – 5:17; Emil Larsson (3) – 6:21; Jonathan Andersson (1) – 10:49; Robert Leino (1) – 12:45 | | Second period | 14:25 – Martin Karlsson (1) |
| Filip Barklund (1) – 4:51; Borna Rendulić (3; PPG) – 16:46 | | Third period | No scoring |
| Jhonas Enroth (22 shots / 21 saves); Jonas Arntzen (1 shot / 1 save) | | Goalie stats | Janne Juvonen (15 shots / 12 saves); Axel Brage (17 shots / 13 saves) |

| 15 April | Örebro HK | 2–1 | OT | Leksands IF | Behrn Arena | Recap |
| No scoring | | First period | | No scoring |
| No scoring | | Second period | | No scoring |
| Gustav Backström (1) – 13:44 | | Third period | | 7:49 – Nils Åman (1) |
| Emil Larsson (4) – 1:15 | | First overtime period | | No scoring |
| Jonas Arntzen (31 shots / 30 saves) | | Goalie stats | | Janne Juvonen (33 shots / 31 saves) |

| Örebro HK win series 4–0 |

==== (4) Skellefteå AIK vs. (5) Luleå HF ====
| 11 April | Skellefteå AIK | 3–2 | 2OT | Luleå HF | Skellefteå Kraft Arena | Recap |
| Niclas Burström (1) – 4:04; Jesper Frödén (1) – 5:05 | | First period | | 6:11 – Jonas Berglund (1) |
| No scoring | | Second period | | No scoring |
| No scoring | | Third period | | 7:28 – Pontus Själin (1) |
| Niclas Burström (2) – 19:16 | | Second overtime period | | No scoring |
| Gustaf Lindvall (45 shots / 43 saves) | | Goalie stats | | Joel Lassinantti (49 shots / 46 saves) |

| 12 April | Skellefteå AIK | 2–3 | Luleå HF | Skellefteå Kraft Arena | Recap |
| No scoring | | First period | No scoring |
| Jesper Frödén (2; PPG) – 7:56 | | Second period | 2:04 – Juhani Tyrväinen (1; PPG); 7:03 – Filip Hållander (1; PPG) |
| Roland McKeown (1) – 19:55 | | Third period | 17:56 – Filip Hållander (2; ENG) |
| Arvid Söderblom (24 shots / 22 saves) | | Goalie stats | Joel Lassinantti (31 shots / 29 saves) |

| 14 April | Luleå HF | 1–0 | Skellefteå AIK | Coop Norrbotten Arena | Recap |
| No scoring | | First period | No scoring |
| No scoring | | Second period | No scoring |
| Daniel Sondell (1; PPG) – 14:37 | | Third period | No scoring |
| Joel Lassinantti (28 shots / 28 saves) | | Goalie stats | Gustaf Lindvall (22 shots / 21 saves) |

| 15 April | Luleå HF | 1–4 | Skellefteå AIK | Coop Norrbotten Arena | Recap |
| Radek Mužik (1) – 2:02 | | First period | No scoring |
| No scoring | | Second period | 6:05 – Andreas Wingerli (1; SHG); 8:48 – Jonathan Johnson (1); 17:48 – Joakim Lindström (1) |
| No scoring | | Third period | 5:23 – Darren Nowick (1) |
| Joel Lassinantti (20 shots / 16 saves); Jesper Wallstedt (4 shots / 4 saves) | | Goalie stats | Arvid Söderblom (37 shots / 36 saves) |

| 17 April | Skellefteå AIK | 1–5 | Luleå HF | Skellefteå Kraft Arena | Recap |
| No scoring | | First period | 13:53 – Chris DeSousa (1); 18:00 – Juhani Tyrväinen (2) |
| Melker Karlsson (1) – 18:52 | | Second period | 5:55 – Nils Lundkvist (1; PPG); 12:25 – Carl Mattsson (1) |
| No scoring | | Third period | 6:50 – Nils Lundkvist (2; PPG) |
| Gustaf Lindvall (29 shots / 24 saves) | | Goalie stats | Joel Lassinantti (38 shots / 37 saves) |

| 19 April | Luleå HF | 3–4 | Skellefteå AIK | Coop Norrbotten Arena | Recap |
| Juhani Tyrväinen (3; PPG) – 8:41 | | First period | No scoring |
| Niklas Olausson (1) – 1:01 | | Second period | 2:12 – Andreas Wingerli (2); 13:37 – Linus Lindström (1) |
| Chris DeSousa (2) – 16:22 | | Third period | 8:15 – Pär Lindholm (1); 9:36 – Rickard Hugg (1) |
| Jesper Wallstedt (27 shots / 23 saves) | | Goalie stats | Gustaf Lindvall (24 shots / 21 saves) |

| 20 April | Skellefteå AIK | 3–1 | Luleå HF | Skellefteå Kraft Arena | Recap |
| Rickard Hugg (2) – 14:43; Joakim Lindström (2) – 18:39 | | First period | No scoring |
| No scoring | | Second period | No scoring |
| Pär Lindholm (2) – 7:32 | | Third period | 17:07 – Isac Brännström (1) |
| Gustaf Lindvall (26 shots / 25 saves) | | Goalie stats | Joel Lassinantti (36 shots / 33 saves) |

| Skellefteå AIK win series 4–3 |

=== Semi-finals ===
==== (1) Växjö Lakers vs. (6) Örebro HK ====
| 22 April | Växjö Lakers | 3–2 | 2OT | Örebro HK | Vida Arena | Recap |
| Hardy Häman Aktell (1) – 2:07 | | First period | | 8:46 – Nick Ebert (1; PPG); 19:22 – Robin Kovacs (1) |
| Jack Drury (2; PPG) – 17:42 | | Second period | | No scoring |
| No scoring | | Third period | | No scoring |
| Richard Gynge (2) – 12:02 | | Second overtime period | | No scoring |
| Viktor Fasth (6 shots / 6 saves); Erik Källgren (32 shots / 30 saves) | | Goalie stats | | Jhonas Enroth (47 shots / 44 saves) |

| 23 April | Växjö Lakers | 0–1 | Örebro HK | Vida Arena | Recap |
| No scoring | | First period | No scoring |
| No scoring | | Second period | No scoring |
| No scoring | | Third period | 2:25 – Linus Öberg (2) |
| Erik Källgren (24 shots / 23 saves) | | Goalie stats | Jhonas Enroth (25 shots / 25 saves) |

| 25 April | Örebro HK | 0–1 | Växjö Lakers | Behrn Arena | Recap |
| No scoring | | First period | 15:32 – Marcus Sylvegård (2) |
| No scoring | | Second period | No scoring |
| No scoring | | Third period | No scoring |
| Jhonas Enroth (27 shots / 26 saves) | | Goalie stats | Erik Källgren (31 shots / 31 saves) |

| 27 April | Örebro HK | 3–2 | Växjö Lakers | Behrn Arena | Recap |
| Nick Ebert (2; PPG) – 15:44 | | First period | No scoring |
| Emil Larsson (5) – 0:49 | | Second period | No scoring |
| Nick Ebert (3) – 2:13 | | Third period | 6:13 – Jack Drury (3); 8:26 – Christian Folin (1) |
| Jhonas Enroth (22 shots / 20 saves) | | Goalie stats | Erik Källgren (27 shots / 24 saves) |

| 29 April | Växjö Lakers | 3–1 | Örebro HK | Vida Arena | Recap |
| Richard Gynge (3) – 4:18; Brendan Gaunce (1) – 19:24 | | First period | No scoring |
| No scoring | | Second period | No scoring |
| Brendan Gaunce (2; ENG) – 18:26 | | Third period | 12:25 – Kristian Näkyvä (2) |
| Erik Källgren (18 shots / 17 saves) | | Goalie stats | Jhonas Enroth (33 shots / 31 saves) |

| Växjö Lakers win series 3–2 |

==== (2) Rögle BK vs. (4) Skellefteå AIK ====
| 23 April | Rögle BK | 3–2 | Skellefteå AIK | Catena Arena | Recap |
| Dennis Everberg (2; PPG) – 2:51; Anton Bengtsson (2) – 17:31 | | First period | No scoring |
| No scoring | | Second period | No scoring |
| Adam Edström (3) – 13:18 | | Third period | 9:28 – Oskar Nilsson (1); 17:53 – Oscar Möller (1) |
| Christoffer Rifalk (22 shots / 20 saves) | | Goalie stats | Gustaf Lindvall (28 shots / 25 saves) |

| 24 April | Rögle BK | 2–1 | Skellefteå AIK | Catena Arena | Recap |
| Leon Bristedt (1) – 11:35 | | First period | 13:25 – Oscar Möller (2) |
| No scoring | | Second period | No scoring |
| Erik Andersson (1) – 5:57 | | Third period | No scoring |
| Christoffer Rifalk (16 shots / 15 saves) | | Goalie stats | Gustaf Lindvall (23 shots / 21 saves) |

| 26 April | Skellefteå AIK | 4–1 | Rögle BK | Skellefteå Kraft Arena | Recap |
| Melker Karlsson (2; PPG) – 6:14; Niclas Burström (3; PPG) – 8:47 | | First period | No scoring |
| No scoring | | Second period | 7:52 – Adam Tambellini (4) |
| Jesper Frödén (3) – 12:31; Joakim Lindström (3; ENG) – 17:59 | | Third period | No scoring |
| Gustaf Lindvall (25 shots / 24 saves) | | Goalie stats | Christoffer Rifalk (22 shots / 19 saves) |

| 27 April | Skellefteå AIK | 2–1 | OT | Rögle BK | Skellefteå Kraft Arena | Recap |
| No scoring | | First period | | No scoring |
| Niclas Burström (4; PPG) – 3:40 | | Second period | | 4:24 – Joey LaLeggia (1) |
| No scoring | | Third period | | No scoring |
| Joakim Lindström (4) – 7:52 | | First overtime period | | No scoring |
| Gustaf Lindvall (35 shots / 34 saves) | | Goalie stats | | Christoffer Rifalk (18 shots / 16 saves) |

| 29 April | Rögle BK | 4–0 | Skellefteå AIK | Catena Arena | Recap |
| No scoring | | First period | No scoring |
| Leon Bristedt (2; PPG) – 5:19 | | Second period | No scoring |
| Olli Palola (3) – 1:25; Brady Ferguson (1; SHG/ENG) – 16:30; Leon Bristedt (3; ENG) – 17:17 | | Third period | No scoring |
| Christoffer Rifalk (26 shots / 26 saves) | | Goalie stats | Gustaf Lindvall (32 shots / 30 saves) |

| Rögle BK win series 3–2 |

=== Finals ===
==== (1) Växjö Lakers vs. (2) Rögle BK ====
| 1 May | Växjö Lakers | 2–1 | Rögle BK | Vida Arena | Recap |
| Richard Gynge (4) – 13:09 | | First period | No scoring |
| No scoring | | Second period | 18:58 – Moritz Seider (1) |
| Pontus Holmberg (3) – 10:07 | | Third period | No scoring |
| Erik Källgren (24 shots / 23 saves) | | Goalie stats | Christoffer Rifalk (27 shots / 25 saves) |

| 3 May | Växjö Lakers | 3–2 | OT | Rögle BK | Vida Arena | Recap |
| No scoring | | First period | | 4:12 – Adam Tambellini (5) |
| Emil Pettersson (2) – 8:15 | | Second period | | 15:11 – Leon Bristedt (4; PPG) |
| Pontus Holmberg (4) – 3:34 | | Third period | | No scoring |
| Hardy Häman Aktell (2) – 4:36 | | First overtime period | | No scoring |
| Erik Källgren (25 shots / 23 saves) | | Goalie stats | | Christoffer Rifalk (17 shots / 14 saves) |

| 6 May | Rögle BK | 5–1 | Växjö Lakers | Catena Arena | Recap |
| Dennis Everberg (3; SHG) – 12:59; Daniel Zaar (4) – 15:21 | | First period | No scoring |
| Adam Tambellini (6; PPG) – 12:36 | | Second period | No scoring |
| Olli Palola (4) – 15:24; Taylor Matson (2; ENG) – 18:49 | | Third period | 3:52 – Marcus Sylvegård (3) |
| Christoffer Rifalk (23 shots / 22 saves) | | Goalie stats | Erik Källgren (29 shots / 25 saves) |

| 8 May | Rögle BK | 2–3 | OT | Växjö Lakers | Catena Arena | Recap |
| No scoring | | First period | | 11:17 – Brendan Gaunce (3) |
| Anton Bengtsson (3) – 0:33; Niklas Hansson (3; PPG) – 7:20 | | Second period | | No scoring |
| No scoring | | Third period | | 5:48 – Richard Gynge (5) |
| No scoring | | First overtime period | | 1:00 – Pontus Holmberg (5) |
| Christoffer Rifalk (28 shots / 25 saves) | | Goalie stats | | Erik Källgren (21 shots / 19 saves) |

| 10 May | Växjö Lakers | 6–2 | Rögle BK | Vida Arena | Recap |
| No scoring | | First period | 16:38 – Olli Palola (5) |
| Pontus Holmberg (6; PPG) – 11:22 | | Second period | No scoring |
| Fredrik Karlström (5) – 2:50; Jack Drury (4; PPG) – 12:14; Marcus Sylvegård (4; ENG) – 14:26; Jack Drury (5; ENG) – 15:12; Pontus Holmberg (7) – 16:43 | | Third period | 18:01 – Olli Palola (6) |
| Erik Källgren (27 shots / 25 saves) | | Goalie stats | Johan Gustafsson (24 shots / 20 saves) |

| Växjö Lakers win series 4–1 |

=== Statistics ===
==== Scoring leaders ====
The following players led the league in points, at the conclusion of the playoffs. If two or more skaters are tied (i.e. same number of points, goals and played games), all of the tied skaters are shown.

| Player | Team | GP | G | A | Pts | +/– | PIM |
|---|---|---|---|---|---|---|---|
| (Sweden) Pontus Holmberg | Växjö Lakers | 14 | 7 | 7 | 14 | +10 | 8 |
| (United States) Jack Drury | Växjö Lakers | 14 | 5 | 6 | 11 | +5 | 4 |
| (Canada) Adam Tambellini | Rögle BK | 14 | 6 | 4 | 10 | +2 | 6 |
| (Sweden) Richard Gynge | Växjö Lakers | 14 | 5 | 5 | 10 | +6 | 0 |
| (Sweden) Fredrik Karlström | Växjö Lakers | 14 | 5 | 5 | 10 | +9 | 2 |
| (Sweden) Joakim Lindström | Skellefteå AIK | 12 | 4 | 6 | 10 | +2 | 35 |
| (Sweden) Leon Bristedt | Rögle BK | 14 | 4 | 6 | 10 | 0 | 22 |
| (Sweden) Marcus Sylvegård | Växjö Lakers | 14 | 4 | 6 | 10 | +8 | 2 |
| (Latvia) Rodrigo Ābols | Örebro HK | 9 | 3 | 7 | 10 | +4 | 2 |
| (Sweden) Simon Ryfors | Rögle BK | 14 | 1 | 9 | 10 | +2 | 8 |

==== Leading goaltenders ====
The following shows the top five goaltenders who led the league in goals against average, provided that they have played at least 40% of their team's minutes, at the conclusion of the playoffs.

| Player | Team | GP | TOI | W | L | GA | SO | Sv% | GAA |
|---|---|---|---|---|---|---|---|---|---|
| (Sweden) Jhonas Enroth | Örebro HK | 8 | 507:08 | 5 | 3 | 11 | 1 | 95.07 | 1.30 |
| (Sweden) Christoffer Rifalk | Rögle BK | 13 | 790:25 | 8 | 5 | 20 | 3 | 93.03 | 1.52 |
| (Sweden) Erik Källgren | Växjö Lakers | 10 | 620:56 | 7 | 3 | 18 | 1 | 93.02 | 1.74 |
| (Sweden) Gustaf Lindvall | Skellefteå AIK | 10 | 640:00 | 5 | 5 | 21 | 0 | 92.73 | 1.97 |
| (Lithuania) Mantas Armalis | Djurgårdens IF | 3 | 178:08 | 1 | 2 | 6 | 0 | 93.41 | 2.02 |

== Play Out ==
Teams 13 and 14 from the regular season played a best-of-seven series, with the winner remaining in the SHL and the loser relegated to the second tier, HockeyAllsvenskan. The higher-seeded team had home advantage over the series, playing at home for games 1 and 3 (plus 5 and 7 if necessary) while the lower-seeded team was at home for games 2 and 4 (plus 6 if necessary).

| 6 April | Brynäs IF | 2–1 | OT | HV71 | Monitor ERP Arena | Recap |
| No scoring | | First period | | No scoring |
| Emil Molin (1) – 10:13 | | Second period | | No scoring |
| No scoring | | Third period | | 5:39 – Arttu Ilomäki (1; PPG) |
| Linus Ölund (1) – 19:14 | | First overtime period | | No scoring |
| Samuel Ersson (31 shots / 30 saves) | | Goalie stats | | Jonas Gunnarsson (37 shots / 35 saves) |

| 9 April | HV71 | 1–2 | Brynäs IF | Husqvarna Garden | Recap |
| No scoring | | First period | No scoring |
| Fredrik Forsberg (1) – 7:23 | | Second period | 15:11 – Chad Billins (1; PPG); 19:15 – Emil Molin (2) |
| No scoring | | Third period | No scoring |
| Jonas Gunnarsson (19 shots / 17 saves) | | Goalie stats | Samuel Ersson (29 shots / 28 saves) |

| 12 April | Brynäs IF | 1–2 | HV71 | Monitor ERP Arena | Recap |
| No scoring | | First period | No scoring |
| Emil Molin (3; PPG) – 8:33 | | Second period | 9:26 – Fredrik Forsberg (2) |
| No scoring | | Third period | 0:24 – Anton Wedin (1; PPG) |
| Samuel Ersson (17 shots / 15 saves) | | Goalie stats | Jonas Gunnarsson (23 shots / 22 saves) |

| 15 April | HV71 | 1–4 | Brynäs IF | Husqvarna Garden | Recap |
| No scoring | | First period | 16:08 – Simon Bertilsson (1) |
| No scoring | | Second period | 2:13 – Daniel Mannberg (1) |
| Anton Wedin (2; PPG) – 18:29 | | Third period | 7:22 – Johan Alcén (1); 16:26 – Oula Palve (1; ENG) |
| Jonas Gunnarsson (17 shots / 14 saves) | | Goalie stats | Samuel Ersson (25 shots / 24 saves) |

| 18 April | Brynäs IF | 3–2 | OT | HV71 | Monitor ERP Arena | Recap |
| No scoring | | First period | | No scoring |
| Noel Gunler (1; PPG) – 2:50 | | Second period | | 10:26 – Fredrik Forsberg (3; PPG); 12:06 – Anton Wedin (3; PS) |
| Anton Rödin (1) – 3:02 | | Third period | | No scoring |
| Oula Palve (2) – 5:29 | | First overtime period | | No scoring |
| Samuel Ersson (36 shots / 34 saves) | | Goalie stats | | Jonas Gunnarsson (23 shots / 20 saves) |

| Brynäs IF win series 4–1 |

== SHL awards ==
| Award | Winner(s) |
|---|---|
| Guldhjälmen | Marek Hrivík (Leksands IF) |
| Guldpucken | N/A |
| Honken Trophy | Viktor Fasth (Växjö Lakers) |
| Håkan Loob Trophy | Simon Ryfors (Rögle BK) |
| Håkan Loob Trophy | Daniel Viksten (Färjestad BK) |
| Rookie of the Year | William Eklund (Djurgårdens IF) |
| Salming Trophy | Nils Lundkvist (Luleå HF) |
| Stefan Liv Memorial Trophy | Pontus Holmberg (Växjö Lakers) |
| Guldpipan | Mikael Nord |
