= Gustaf Lindvall =

Swedish ice hockey player

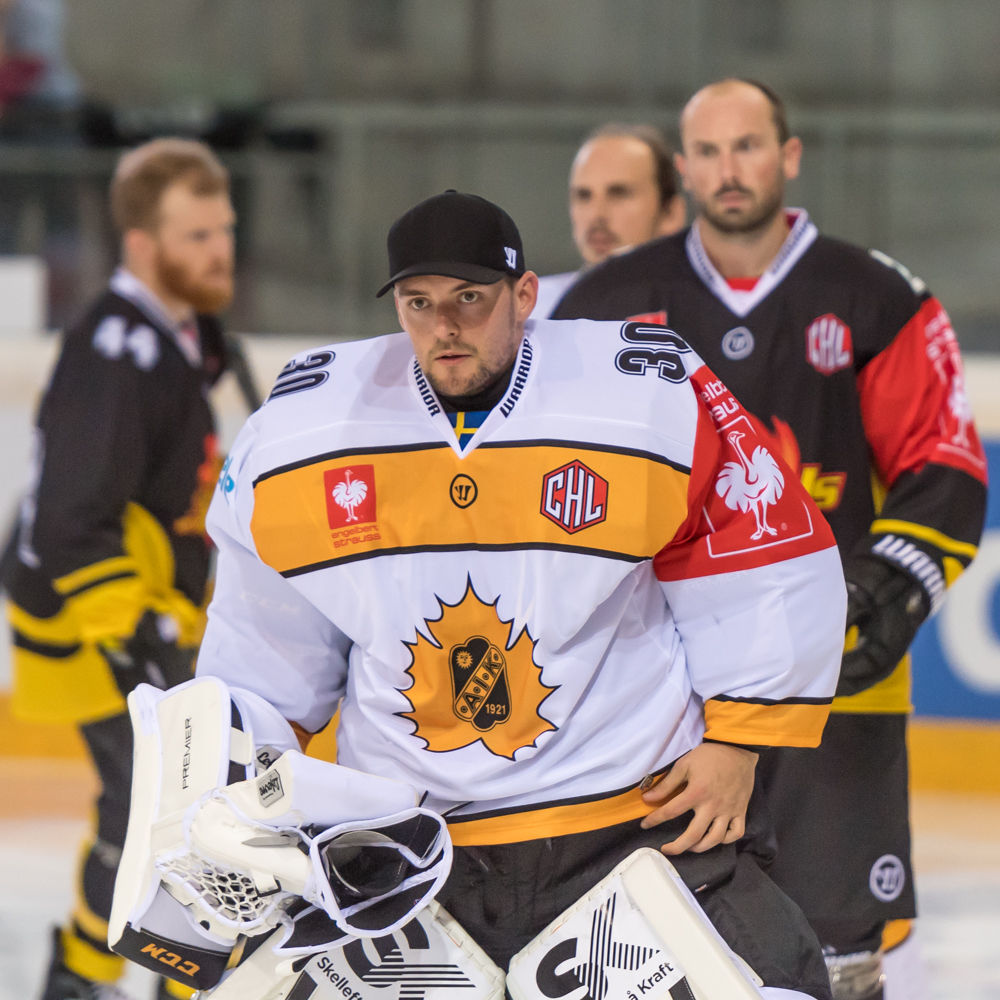
- Born: 8 January 1991 (age 35) Boden, Sweden
- Height: 180 cm (5 ft 11 in)
- Weight: 80 kg (176 lb; 12 st 8 lb)
- Position: Goaltender
- Caught: Right
- Played for: Timrå IK; Skellefteå AIK
- Playing career: 2010–2025

Gustaf Lindvall (born 8 January 1991) is a Swedish former professional ice hockey goaltender who last played with Skellefteå AIK in the Swedish Hockey League (SHL). He previously played with Timrå IK in the Elitserien during the 2010–11 Elitserien season.

== Awards and honours ==
Award	Year
SHL
Le Mat Trophy	2024
