= Simon Ryfors =

Swedish ice hockey forward

- Born: August 16, 1997 (age 28) Stockholm, Sweden
- Height: 5 ft 10 in (178 cm)
- Weight: 181 lb (82 kg; 12 st 13 lb)
- Position: Left wing/Centre
- Shoots: Left
- NL team Former teams: HC Davos; Rögle BK
- NHL draft: Undrafted
- Playing career: 2016–present

Simon Ryfors (born August 16, 1997) is a Swedish professional ice hockey forward who is currently playing for HC Davos of the National League (NL).

== Playing career ==
Undrafted, Ryfors played in his native Sweden, within the youth program of Rögle BK. He made his professional debut with Rögle BK in Swedish Hockey League (SHL) during the 2015–16 season.

In his sixth season with the club in 2020–21, Ryfors appeared in 51 games posting 25 goals and 45 points. He led Rögle BK in goals and ranked second for points. Helping the club in the post-season reach the Championship finals, he contributed with a goal and 10 points through 14 playoff games.

On 12 May 2021, Ryfors agreed to sign a one year, two-way contract with the Tampa Bay Lightning of the NHL.

After spending two seasons in the Lightning organization with the Syracuse Crunch, Ryfors returned to the SHL, signing with his former team, Rögle BK.

After one year with Rögle BK, Ryfors signed a two-year contract with HC Davos. In July 2025, he signed an early two-year extension with Davos, lasting until the end of the 2027-28 season.

== Career statistics ==
			Regular season					Playoffs
Season	Team	League	GP	G	A	Pts	PIM	GP	G	A	Pts	PIM
2013–14	Rögle BK	J18	21	11	16	27	6	—	—	—	—	—
2013–14	Rögle BK	J20	9	1	0	1	4	—	—	—	—	—
2014–15	Rögle BK	J18	3	3	1	4	2	—	—	—	—	—
2014–15	Rögle BK	J20	41	16	6	22	16	6	1	1	2	0
2015–16	Rögle BK	J20	35	10	13	23	26	7	0	3	3	2
2015–16	Rögle BK	SHL	1	0	0	0	0	—	—	—	—	—
2016–17	Rögle BK	J20	16	7	17	24	14	—	—	—	—	—
2016–17	Rögle BK	SHL	46	5	4	9	6	—	—	—	—	—
2017–18	Rögle BK	SHL	49	2	6	8	10	—	—	—	—	—
2017–18	IK Oskarshamn	Allsv	2	0	2	2	0	—	—	—	—	—
2018–19	Rögle BK	SHL	51	3	10	13	41	2	0	0	0	0
2019–20	Rögle BK	SHL	52	6	12	18	55	—	—	—	—	—
2020–21	Rögle BK	SHL	51	25	20	45	53	14	1	9	10	8
2021–22	Syracuse Crunch	AHL	72	11	24	35	31	5	1	1	2	0
2022–23	Syracuse Crunch	AHL	72	27	32	59	32	5	4	3	7	4
2023–24	Rögle BK	SHL	48	8	20	28	22	15	2	6	8	12
2024–25	HC Davos	NL	42	7	23	30	20	10	2	4	6	6
SHL totals			298	49	72	121	187	35	4	15	19	24
