= Olli Palola =

Finnish ice hockey player (born 1988)

- Born: 8 April 1988 (age 37) Oulu, Finland
- Height: 5 ft 10 in (178 cm)
- Weight: 176 lb (80 kg; 12 st 8 lb)
- Position: Forward
- Shoots: Right
- SHL team Former teams: Timrå IK; Ilves; Lukko Rauma; Tappara; HC Vityaz; Växjö Lakers; Jokerit; Kunlun Red Star; Rögle BK; HIFK
- National team: Finland
- Playing career: 2006–present

Olli Palola (born 8 April 1988) is a Finnish professional ice hockey forward who plays professionally for Timrå IK of the Swedish Hockey League (SHL).

== Playing career ==
Palola saw his first action in the Finnish top-flight Liiga during the 2006–07 season, playing six contests for Ilves. He then spent four years with fellow Liiga team Lukko, helping the team to a third-place finish in 2010–11. After having transferred to Tappara, he made it to the 2013 and 2014 Liiga finals with the team. During the 2013-14 campaign, Palola scored 30 goals and dealt out 26 assists in 80 games and was presented with the Aarne Honkavaara Trophy as the league's best goalscorer. He won the award also the following season (2014–15) after tallying 40 goals and 25 assists in 80 games en route to another Liiga runner-up finish.

Palola then opted to continue his career in the Kontinental Hockey League (KHL), signing with HC Vityaz for the 2015–16 season. His number went down in Russia: He saw the ice in 27 KHL games, scoring one goal and dishing out four assists.

In May 2016, he signed a contract with the Växjö Lakers of the Swedish Hockey League (SHL). After returning to the KHL the following season with Jokerit, Palola signed as a free agent a one-year contract with Chinese outfit Kunlun Red Star for the 2018–19 season on May 2, 2018.

== International play ==
Medal record

Representing Finland

Ice hockey

World Championships
Silver medal – second place	2014 Minsk	

Palola won his first caps for Finland's men's national team during the 2013–14 season: He played at the Euro Hockey Tour and won a silver medal with Team Finland at the 2014 IIHF World Championships in Minsk. Palola made ten appearances during the tournament, chipping in with four goals.

== Career statistics ==
=== Regular season and playoffs ===
			Regular season					Playoffs
Season	Team	League	GP	G	A	Pts	PIM	GP	G	A	Pts	PIM
2005–06	Ilves	Jr. A	29	8	3	11	60	3	0	0	0	8
2006–07	Ilves	Jr. A	30	17	15	32	30	5	0	1	1	4
2006–07	Ilves	SM-l	6	0	0	0	0	—	—	—	—	—
2007–08	Ilves	Jr. A	41	12	13	25	53	—	—	—	—	—
2007–08	Ilves	SM-l	8	0	2	2	2	2	0	0	0	0
2008–09	Ilves	Jr. A	35	21	36	57	38	—	—	—	—	—
2008–09	Ilves	SM-l	5	0	0	0	0	—	—	—	—	—
2009–10	Ilves	Jr. A	4	2	4	6	4	—	—	—	—	—
2009–10	Ilves	SM-l	45	3	4	7	12	2	0	0	0	0
2010–11	Ilves	SM-l	41	2	2	4	18	9	0	0	0	6
2010–11	Hokki	Mestis	2	1	1	2	0	—	—	—	—	—
2010–11	LeKi	Mestis	2	1	0	1	2	—	—	—	—	—
2011–12	Tappara	SM-l	45	5	8	13	22	—	—	—	—	—
2011–12	Sport	Mestis	2	0	1	1	2	—	—	—	—	—
2012–13	Tappara	SM-l	36	4	3	7	33	15	6	1	7	0
2012–13	LeKi	Mestis	18	9	7	16	8	—	—	—	—	—
2013–14	Tappara	Liiga	60	27	17	44	46	20	3	7	10	8
2014–15	Tappara	Liiga	60	29	20	49	42	20	11	5	16	12
2015–16	HC Vityaz	KHL	27	1	4	5	10	—	—	—	—	—
2016–17	Växjö Lakers	SHL	52	21	27	48	18	6	1	3	4	4
2017–18	Jokerit	KHL	50	7	17	24	16	10	6	1	7	4
2018–19	Kunlun Red Star	KHL	61	19	6	25	16	—	—	—	—	—
2019–20	Kunlun Red Star	KHL	38	5	3	8	12	—	—	—	—	—
2020–21	Rögle BK	SHL	43	12	14	26	26	14	6	0	6	2
2021–22	HIFK	Liiga	37	14	12	26	28	7	1	3	4	4
2022–23	HIFK	Liiga	23	3	2	5	8	—	—	—	—	—
Liiga totals			366	87	70	157	211	75	21	16	37	30
KHL totals			176	32	30	62	54	10	6	1	7	4
SHL totals			95	33	41	74	44	20	7	3	10	6

=== International ===
Year	Team	Event	Result	GP	G	A	Pts	PIM
2014	Finland	WC	2nd place, silver medalist(s)	10	4	0	4	8
2018	Finland	WC	5th	6	0	0	0	0
Senior totals				16	4	0	4	8
