= Niclas Burström =

Swedish ice hockey player (born 1991)

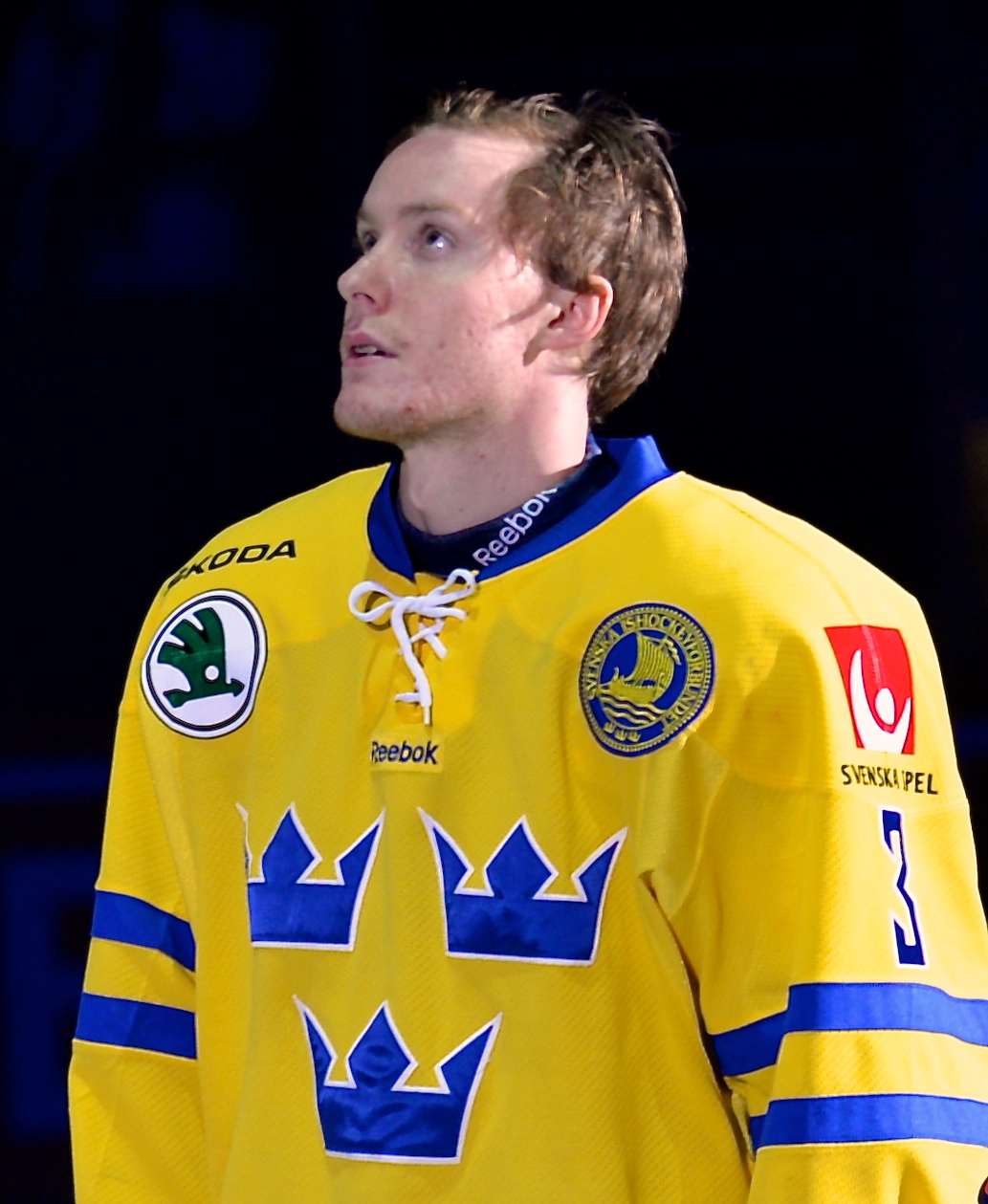
- Niclas Burström playing for Team Sweden against Team Russia during the Sweden Hockey Games in Stockholm, Sweden in May 2014
- Born: January 25, 1991 (age 35) Jörn, Sweden
- Height: 5 ft 10 in (178 cm)
- Weight: 163 lb (74 kg; 11 st 9 lb)
- Position: Defence
- Shot: Left
- Played for: Skellefteå AIK; Växjö Lakers; HC Vityaz; HC Yugra; Schwenninger Wild Wings; IK Oskarshamn
- National team: Sweden
- Playing career: 2009–2025

Niclas Burström (born January 25, 1991) is a Swedish former professional ice hockey defenceman who played in the Swedish Hockey League (SHL).

== Playing career ==
Burström played as a youth in his native Sweden within the program of Skellefteå AIK of the Swedish Hockey League (SHL). He made his professional debut in the 2008–09 season.

On September 28, 2012, Burström as an emerging defenseman signed a four-year contract extension to remain with Champions Skellefteå.

After completing his tenth season within Skellefteå's organization following the 2016–17 season, Burström left as a free agent seeking a new challenge in agreeing to a two-year contract with Russian club, HC Vityaz of the KHL on May 3, 2017. In the 2017–18 season, Burström appeared in 29 games from the blueline, registering just 1 goal. On November 19, 2017, he was traded by Vityaz to Yugra, recapturing his form to play out the season with 6 points in 24 games.

Having returned to the SHL with the Växjö Lakers for the 2018–19 season, Burström then returned to original hometown club, Skellefteå AIK, agreeing on a two-year contract on 11 April 2019.

Following a lone season in the Deutsche Eishockey Liga (DEL) with the Schwenninger Wild Wings, Burström returned to the SHL after securing a three-year contract with IK Oskarshamn on 16 April 2022.

At the conclusion of his contract with Oskarshamn, having played the 2024–25 season in the Allsvenskan, Burström announced his retirement from professional hockey to take up a junior development managing role within IK Oskarshamn on 4 April 2025.

== Career statistics ==
=== Regular season and playoffs ===
			Regular season					Playoffs
Season	Team	League	GP	G	A	Pts	PIM	GP	G	A	Pts	PIM
2006–07	Skellefteå AIK	J18 Allsv	14	0	6	6	20	—	—	—	—	—
2006–07	Skellefteå AIK	J20	—	—	—	—	—	1	0	0	0	0
2007–08	Skellefteå AIK	J18	1	0	1	1	0	—	—	—	—	—
2007–08	Skellefteå AIK	J18 Allsv	4	0	1	1	8	—	—	—	—	—
2007–08	Skellefteå AIK	J20	33	1	7	8	26	2	1	1	2	4
2008–09	Skellefteå AIK	J18	4	3	3	6	4	—	—	—	—	—
2008–09	Skellefteå AIK	J18 Allsv	—	—	—	—	—	8	1	4	5	22
2008–09	Skellefteå AIK	J20	39	7	8	15	46	5	0	1	1	6
2008–09	Skellefteå AIK	SEL	1	0	0	0	0	—	—	—	—	—
2009–10	Skellefteå AIK	J20	28	7	14	21	24	—	—	—	—	—
2009–10	Skellefteå AIK	SEL	11	0	0	0	4	—	—	—	—	—
2009–10	Växjö Lakers	Allsv	12	0	2	2	0	10	4	1	5	4
2010–11	Skellefteå AIK	J20	1	0	0	0	0	—	—	—	—	—
2010–11	Skellefteå AIK	SEL	52	0	7	7	16	18	1	3	4	8
2011–12	Skellefteå AIK	SEL	51	6	6	12	32	19	1	2	3	2
2012–13	Skellefteå AIK	SEL	51	3	11	14	26	12	1	5	6	6
2013–14	Skellefteå AIK	SHL	55	6	14	20	32	14	1	2	3	10
2014–15	Skellefteå AIK	SHL	54	4	14	18	18	15	1	4	5	4
2015–16	Skellefteå AIK	SHL	50	9	19	28	42	16	1	9	10	8
2016–17	Skellefteå AIK	SHL	29	2	10	12	18	7	0	2	2	2
2017–18	HC Vityaz	KHL	29	1	0	1	10	—	—	—	—	—
2017–18	HC Yugra	KHL	24	2	4	6	10	—	—	—	—	—
2018–19	Växjö Lakers	SHL	51	1	4	5	14	7	0	1	1	6
2019–20	Skellefteå AIK	SHL	48	8	6	14	24	—	—	—	—	—
2020–21	Skellefteå AIK	SHL	44	7	10	17	24	12	4	1	5	29
2021–22	Schwenninger Wild Wings	DEL	37	3	10	13	36	—	—	—	—	—
2022–23	IK Oskarshamn	SHL	46	1	11	12	18	3	0	0	0	0
2023–24	IK Oskarshman	SHL	49	2	6	8	40	—	—	—	—	—
2024–25	IK Oskarshamn	Allsv	42	10	10	20	12	8	2	0	2	4
SHL totals			592	49	118	167	308	123	10	29	39	75

Medal record

Representing Sweden

Ice hockey

World Championships
Bronze medal – third place	2014 Minsk	

=== International ===
Year	Team	Event	Result	GP	G	A	Pts	PIM
2014	Sweden	WC	3rd place, bronze medalist(s)	7	0	0	0	2
Senior totals				7	0	0	0	2

== Awards and honours ==
Award	Year
SHL
Le Mat Trophy (Skellefteå AIK)	2013, 2014
Salming Trophy	2016
