= 2016–17 SHL season =

- League: Swedish Hockey League
- Sport: Ice hockey
- Duration: September 2016 – April 2017

Regular season
- League champion: Växjö Lakers
- Top scorer: Joakim Lindström (Skellefteå AIK)

Playoffs
- Playoffs MVP: Simon Önerud (HV71)
- Finals champions: HV71
- Runners-up: Brynäs IF

SHL seasons
- 2015–16 2017–18

The 2016–17 SHL season is the 42nd season of the Swedish Hockey League (SHL). The regular season began in September 2016 and ended in March 2017. The playoffs follow the conclusion of the regular season.

Rögle BK and Leksands IF were forced to play in the SHL qualifiers to defend their SHL status. Rögle won their series against BIK Karlskoga in four games while Leksand lost to Mora IK over six games. Therefore, Mora were promoted to the SHL at the expense of Leksand.

== Regular season ==
Teams participating in the 2016–17 SHL season

=== Standings ===
Pos	Team	Pld	W	OTW	OTL	L	GF	GA	GD	Pts	Qualification
1	Växjö Lakers	52	26	7	7	12	165	118	+47	99	Qualification to Quarter-finals
2	HV71	52	27	6	5	14	152	99	+53	98	Qualification to Quarter-finals
3	Frölunda HC	52	27	6	4	15	142	114	+28	97	Qualification to Quarter-finals
4	Linköpings HC	52	27	5	5	15	136	116	+20	96	Qualification to Quarter-finals
5	Brynäs IF	52	27	4	4	17	156	124	+32	93	Qualification to Quarter-finals
6	Skellefteå AIK	52	25	6	3	18	129	123	+6	90	Qualification to Quarter-finals
7	Färjestad BK	52	22	9	3	18	133	121	+12	87	Qualification to Round of 16
8	Malmö Redhawks	52	23	3	6	20	132	116	+16	81	Qualification to Round of 16
9	Luleå HF	52	16	7	8	21	118	136	−18	70	Qualification to Round of 16
10	Djurgårdens IF	52	15	7	11	19	110	128	−18	70	Qualification to Round of 16
11	Karlskrona HK	52	20	2	4	26	110	122	−12	68	
12	Örebro HK	52	11	7	6	28	103	155	−52	53	
13	Rögle BK	52	12	4	3	33	115	158	−43	47	Qualification to Relegation playoffs
14	Leksands IF	52	12	1	5	34	93	164	−71	43	Qualification to Relegation playoffs

Updated to match(es) played on 9 March 2017. Source: Swedish Hockey League
Rules for classification: 1) Points; 2) Goal difference; 3) Number of goals scored

=== Statistics ===
==== Scoring leaders ====
List shows the ten best skaters based on the number of points during the regular season. If two or more skaters are tied (i.e. same number of points, goals and played games), all of the tied skaters are shown.

As of 9 March 2017

GP = Games played; G = Goals; A = Assists; Pts = Points; +/– = Plus/minus; PIM = Penalty minutes

Player	Team	GP	G	A	Pts	+/–	PIM
(Sweden) Joakim Lindström	Skellefteå AIK	51	18	36	54	–1	32
(United States) Broc Little	Linköpings HC	52	19	34	53	+12	16
(Finland) Olli Palola	Växjö Lakers	52	21	27	48	+19	18
(Sweden) Oskar Lindblom	Brynäs IF	52	22	25	47	+16	18
(Denmark) Jesper Jensen	Brynäs IF	50	9	33	42	+13	14
(Sweden) Alexander Bergström	Karlskrona HK	52	15	25	40	–2	26
(Canada) Kevin Clark	Brynäs IF	52	23	16	39	+4	22
(Sweden) Henrik Tömmernes	Frölunda HC	49	8	31	39	+2	16
(Sweden) Emil Pettersson	Skellefteå/Växjö	51	15	23	38	+7	12
(Slovakia) Libor Hudáček	Örebro HK	49	14	24	38	+6	38

==== Leading goaltenders ====
These are the leaders in GAA among goaltenders who played at least 40% of the team's minutes. The table is sorted by GAA, and the criteria for inclusion are bolded.

As of 9 March 2017

GP = Games played; TOI = Time on ice (minutes); GA = Goals against; SO = Shutouts; Sv% = Save percentage; GAA = Goals against average

Player	Team	GP	TOI	GA	SO	Sv%	GAA
(Sweden) Linus Söderström	HV71	22	1340:39	30	6	94.32	1.34
(Sweden) Oscar Alsenfelt	Malmö Redhawks	34	1879:13	49	9	94.46	1.56
(Sweden) Marcus Högberg	Linköpings HC	33	1999:36	63	4	93.18	1.89
(Sweden) Johannes Jönsson	Karlskrona HK	24	1424:35	46	2	93.77	1.94
(Sweden) Adam Reideborn	Djurgårdens IF	25	1360:50	45	4	91.41	1.98
(Sweden) Viktor Andrén	Växjö Lakers	23	1355:15	45	4	91.38	1.99
(Sweden) Joacim Eriksson	Växjö Lakers	29	1729:02	59	2	91.58	2.05
(Sweden) Johan Gustafsson	Frölunda HC	38	2074:28	73	2	91.74	2.11
(Norway) Lars Haugen	Färjestad BK	35	2014:41	72	6	92.48	2.14
(Sweden) Fredrik Pettersson-Wentzel	HV71	30	1793:58	65	1	91.02	2.17

== Playoffs ==
The top six teams will qualify directly for the quarter-finals, while the four teams ranked 7–10 will play a best-of-three series (also called a Play In to the Playoffs) and battle for the two remaining spots.

=== Playoff bracket ===
In the first round the 7th-ranked team will meet the 10th-ranked team and the 8th-ranked team will meet the 9th-ranked team for a place in the second round. In the second round, the top-ranked team will meet the lowest-ranked winner of the first round, the 2nd-ranked team will face the other winner of the first round, the 3rd-ranked team will face the 6th-ranked team, and the 4th-ranked team will face the 5th-ranked team. In the third round, the highest remaining seed is matched against the lowest remaining seed. In each round the higher-seeded team is awarded home advantage. In the first round the meetings are played as best-of-three series and the rest is best-of-seven series that follows an alternating home team format: the higher-seeded team will play at home for games 1 and 3 (plus 5 and 7 if necessary), and the lower-seeded team will be at home for game 2 and 4 (plus 6 if necessary).

First round
7	**Färjestad BK**	**2**
10	Djurgårdens IF	1
8	**Malmö Redhawks**	**2**
9	Luleå HF	0

Quarterfinals
1	Växjö Lakers	2
8	**Malmö Redhawks**	**4**
2	**HV71**	**4**
7	Färjestad BK	0
3	**Frölunda HC**	**4**
6	Skellefteå AIK	3
4	Linköpings HC	2
5	**Brynäs IF**	**4**

Semifinals
2	**HV71**	**4**
8	Malmö Redhawks	1
(Pairings are re-seeded after the first and second round)
3	Frölunda HC	3
5	**Brynäs IF**	**4**

Finals
2	**HV71**	**4**
5	Brynäs IF	3

=== Round of 16 ===
The teams ranked 7 and 10, and the teams ranked 8 and 9, respectively, will face each other in a best-of-three series in order to qualify for the quarter-finals. The better-ranked teams in the two series will receive home advantage, i.e. two home games, if necessary. The two winners will take the two remaining quarter-final spots.

==== (7) Färjestad BK vs. (10) Djurgårdens IF ====
11 March	**Färjestad BK**	**4–1**	Djurgårdens IF	Löfbergs Arena	Recap
No scoring		**First period**	No scoring
Magnus Nygren 1 – 5:49		**Second period**	18:10 – Niclas Bergfors 1
Mikael Wikstrand 1 – 4:13; Alexander Johansson 1 – 15:17; Magnus Nygren 2 – en – 18:02		**Third period**	No scoring
Stefan Steen (33 saves / 34 shots)		**Goalie stats**	Adam Reideborn (22 saves / 25 shots)

13 March	**Djurgårdens IF**	4–3	**OT**	Färjestad BK	Hovet	Recap
Markus Ljungh 1 – pp – 8:29; Patrik Lundh 1 – pp – 12:03		First period		13:07 – pp – Milan Gulaš 1
Linus Johansson 1 – 19:28		Second period		6:15 – sh – Alexander Johansson 2; 14:33 – pp – Joel Eriksson Ek 1
No scoring		Third period		No scoring
Gustav Possler 1 – 5:31		First overtime period		No scoring
Adam Reideborn (21 saves / 24 shots)		Goalie stats		Stefan Steen (33 saves / 37 shots)

15 March	**Färjestad BK**	**5–3**	Djurgårdens IF	Löfbergs Arena	Recap
No scoring		**First period**	14:08 – Niclas Bergfors 2
Joel Eriksson Ek 2 – pp – 5:05		**Second period**	18:40 – Henrik Eriksson 1
Mikael Wikstrand 2 – 0:50; Milan Gulaš 2 – 11:00; Per Åslund 1 – en – 18:10; Joel Eriksson Ek 3 – en – 19:26		**Third period**	18:51 – Niclas Bergfors 3
Stefan Steen (31 saves / 34 shots)		**Goalie stats**	Adam Reideborn (25 saves / 28 shots); Mikael Tellqvist (1 save / 1 shot)

**Färjestad BK won series 2–1**

==== (8) Malmö Redhawks vs. (9) Luleå HF ====
11 March	**Malmö Redhawks**	**6–1**	Luleå HF	Malmö Arena	Recap
Rhett Rakhshani 1 – 3:36; Mathias Tjärnqvist 1 – 10:42; Frederik Storm 1 – 13:28		**First period**	8:50 – Jacob Lagacé 1
Nichlas Hardt 1 – 4:00; Andreas Thuresson 1 – 10:36		**Second period**	No scoring
Rhett Rakhshani 2 – pp – 12:59		**Third period**	No scoring
Oscar Alsenfelt (25 saves / 26 shots)		**Goalie stats**	Joel Lassinantti (13 saves / 18 shots); Filip Gustavsson (10 saves / 11 shots)

13 March	Luleå HF	**4–5**	**Malmö Redhawks**	Coop Norrbotten Arena	Recap
Craig Schira 1 – 11:51; Petter Emanuelsson 1 – pp – 15:56		**First period**	7:53 – Jens Olsson 1 – 3:36; 10:04 – Nichlas Hardt 2
Petter Emanuelsson 2 – 1:06		**Second period**	8:41 – Nils Andersson 1
Bill Sweatt 1 – 13:09		**Third period**	6:03 – sh – Fredrik Händemark 1; 19:23 – Robin Álvarez 1
Joel Lassinantti (5 saves / 8 shots); Filip Gustavsson (13 saves / 15 shots)		**Goalie stats**	Oscar Alsenfelt (19 saves / 23 shots)

**Malmö Redhawks won series 2–0**

=== Quarter-finals ===
==== (1) Växjö Lakers vs. (8) Malmö Redhawks ====
17 March	Växjö Lakers	1–2	**OT**	**Malmö Redhawks**	Vida Arena	Recap
No scoring		First period		No scoring
No scoring		Second period		9:16 – Robin Álvarez 2
Tuomas Kiiskinen 1 – pp – 19:50		Third period		No scoring
No scoring		First overtime period		16:51 – pp – Nichlas Hardt 3
Viktor Andrén (35 saves / 37 shots)		Goalie stats		Oscar Alsenfelt (22 saves / 23 shots)

19 March	Malmö Redhawks	2–3	**OT**	**Växjö Lakers**	Malmö Arena	Recap
Rhett Rakhshani 3 – 9:39		First period		No scoring
Andreas Thuresson 2 – pp – 5:21		Second period		8:54 – Emil Pettersson 1; 18:59 – Erik Josefsson 1
No scoring		Third period		No scoring
No scoring		First overtime period		2:17 – pp – Emil Pettersson 2
Oscar Alsenfelt (19 saves / 22 shots)		Goalie stats		Joacim Eriksson (30 saves / 32 shots)

21 March	Växjö Lakers	**3–4**	**Malmö Redhawks**	Vida Arena	Recap
No scoring		**First period**	18:51 – Frederik Storm 2
Linus Fröberg 1 – 1:35		**Second period**	5:31 – pp2 – Ilari Filppula 1; 19:32 – Christoffer Forsberg 1
Josh Hennessy 1 – 1:34; Robert Rosén 1 – 19:32		**Third period**	9:11 – pp – Rhett Rakhshani 4
Joacim Eriksson (21 saves / 25 shots)		**Goalie stats**	Cristopher Nihlstorp (21 saves / 24 shots)

23 March	**Malmö Redhawks**	4–3	**OT**	Växjö Lakers	Malmö Arena	Recap
No scoring		First period		16:48 – Robert Rosén 2; 17:33 – Emil Pettersson 3
No scoring		Second period		8:54 – Tuomas Kiiskinen 2
Frederik Storm 3 – pp – 0:27; Mathias Tjärnqvist 2 – 1:48; Robin Álvarez 3 – 3:51		Third period		No scoring
Andreas Thuresson 3 – 8:44		First overtime period		No scoring
Cristopher Nihlstorp (23 saves / 26 shots)		Goalie stats		Joacim Eriksson (29 saves / 33 shots)

25 March	**Växjö Lakers**	**2–0**	Malmö Redhawks	Vida Arena	Recap
No scoring		**First period**	No scoring
Emil Pettersson 4 – 1:13; Tuomas Kiiskinen 3 – pp – 16:17		**Second period**	No scoring
No scoring		**Third period**	No scoring
Joacim Eriksson (20 saves / 20 shots)		**Goalie stats**	Cristopher Nihlstorp (19 saves / 21 shots)

27 March	**Malmö Redhawks**	**2–1**	Växjö Lakers	Malmö Arena	Recap
Noah Welch 1 – 16:34		**First period**	No scoring
No scoring		**Second period**	10:31 – pp – Olli Palola 1
Rhett Rakhshani 5 – 8:49		**Third period**	No scoring
Oscar Alsenfelt (30 saves / 31 shots)		**Goalie stats**	Joacim Eriksson (34 saves / 36 shots)

**Malmö Redhawks won series 4–2**

==== (2) HV71 vs. (7) Färjestad BK ====
18 March	**HV71**	**3–1**	Färjestad BK	Kinnarps Arena	Recap
Filip Sandberg 1 – 18:27		**First period**	1:29 – Marcus Nilsson 1
No scoring		**Second period**	No scoring
David Ullström 1 – 16:48; Simon Önerud 1 – en – 19:06		**Third period**	No scoring
Linus Söderström (26 saves / 27 shots)		**Goalie stats**	Lars Haugen (28 saves / 30 shots)

20 March	Färjestad BK	**1–3**	**HV71**	Löfbergs Arena	Recap
No scoring		**First period**	10:52 – Martin Thörnberg 1
John Persson 1 – pp – 17:27		**Second period**	18:47 – Ted Brithén 1
No scoring		**Third period**	6:45 – pp – Martin Thörnberg 2
Stefan Steen (24 saves / 27 shots)		**Goalie stats**	Linus Söderström (22 saves / 23 shots)

22 March	**HV71**	4–3	**OT**	Färjestad BK	Kinnarps Arena	Recap
No scoring		First period		No scoring
Pär Arlbrandt 1 – 1:01		Second period		4:30 – Anton Gustafsson 1; 19:33 – John Persson 2
Simon Önerud 2 – 3:57; Simon Önerud 3 – pp – 17:36		Third period		19:09 – Jonas Holøs 1
Andreas Borgman 1 – 1:26		First overtime period		No scoring
Linus Söderström (20 saves / 23 shots)		Goalie stats		Stefan Steen (30 saves / 34 shots)

24 March	Färjestad BK	**2–3**	**HV71**	Löfbergs Arena	Recap
No scoring		**First period**	13:16 – pp – Martin Thörnberg 3; 15:46 – Filip Sandberg 2
Milan Gulaš 3 – 11:27; Alexander Johansson 3 – 18:05		**Second period**	0:48 – Lawrence Pilut 1
No scoring		**Third period**	No scoring
Stefan Steen (19 saves / 22 shots)		**Goalie stats**	Linus Söderström (30 saves / 32 shots)

**HV71 won series 4–0**

==== (3) Frölunda HC vs. (6) Skellefteå AIK ====
17 March	**Frölunda HC**	**3–0**	Skellefteå AIK	Scandinavium	Recap
No scoring		**First period**	No scoring
Simon Hjalmarsson 1 – 19:10		**Second period**	No scoring
Simon Hjalmarsson 2 – 1:12; Nicklas Lasu 1 – en – 18:40		**Third period**	No scoring
Johan Gustafsson (23 saves / 23 shots)		**Goalie stats**	Joni Ortio (18 saves / 20 shots)

19 March	**Skellefteå AIK**	**4–1**	Frölunda HC	Skellefteå Kraft Arena	Recap
No scoring		**First period**	0:14 – Joel Lundqvist 1
Axel Holmström 1 – pp – 12:31; Andreas Wingerli 1 – 14:55		**Second period**	No scoring
Jesper Olofsson 1 – pp – 3:18; Joakim Lindström 1 – 9:16		**Third period**	No scoring
Joni Ortio (24 saves / 25 shots)		**Goalie stats**	Johan Gustafsson (28 saves / 32 shots)

21 March	Frölunda HC	**2–3**	**Skellefteå AIK**	Scandinavium	Recap
Jacob Larsson 1 – 9:32		**First period**	7:20 – Axel Holmström 2
No scoring		**Second period**	10:42 – Axel Holmström 3; 14:33 – Jimmie Ericsson 1
Casey Wellman 1 – 3:37		**Third period**	No scoring
Johan Gustafsson (16 saves / 19 shots)		**Goalie stats**	Joni Ortio (25 saves / 27 shots)

23 March	**Skellefteå AIK**	**3–0**	Frölunda HC	Skellefteå Kraft Arena	Recap
Oscar Möller 1 – pp – 9:51; Henrik Hetta 1 – 14:31		**First period**	No scoring
Mark Katic 1 – pp – 5:34		**Second period**	No scoring
No scoring		**Third period**	No scoring
Joni Ortio (25 saves / 25 shots)		**Goalie stats**	Johan Gustafsson (22 saves / 25 shots)

25 March	**Frölunda HC**	**4–1**	Skellefteå AIK	Scandinavium	Recap
Rasmus Dahlin 1 – pp – 16:34		**First period**	No scoring
Carl Grundström 1 – 12:01		**Second period**	No scoring
Christoffer Ehn 1 – 3:19; Henrik Tömmernes 1 – en – 19:49		**Third period**	12:41 – Bud Holloway 1
Johan Gustafsson (29 saves / 30 shots)		**Goalie stats**	Joni Ortio (16 saves / 19 shots)

27 March	Skellefteå AIK	1–2	**OT**	**Frölunda HC**	Skellefteå Kraft Arena	Recap
Pär Lindholm 1 – 18:52		First period		5:28 – pp – Victor Olofsson 1
No scoring		Second period		No scoring
No scoring		Third period		No scoring
No scoring		First overtime period		11:58 – Nicklas Lasu 2
Joni Ortio (35 saves / 37 shots)		Goalie stats		Johan Gustafsson (42 saves / 43 shots)

29 March	**Frölunda HC**	3–2	**OT**	Skellefteå AIK	Scandinavium	Recap
Simon Hjalmarsson 3 – 2:30		First period		No scoring
No scoring		Second period		8:45 – pp – Joakim Lindström 2; 14:21 – Andreas Wingerli 2
Jonathan Sigalet 1 – 4:40		Third period		No scoring
Victor Olofsson 2 – 9:52		First overtime period		No scoring
Johan Gustafsson (29 saves / 31 shots)		Goalie stats		Joni Ortio (37 saves / 40 shots)

**Frölunda HC won series 4–3**

==== (4) Linköpings HC vs. (5) Brynäs IF ====
18 March	Linköpings HC	**0–6**	**Brynäs IF**	Saab Arena	Recap
No scoring		**First period**	0:27 – Jesper Jensen 1; 5:03 – pp – Jesper Jensen 2; 18:19 – sh – Daniel Mannberg 1
No scoring		**Second period**	1:30 – Lukas Kilström 1; 7:29 – Jesper Boqvist 1
No scoring		**Third period**	19:25 – Jacob Blomqvist 1
Marcus Högberg (13 saves / 16 shots); Jacob Johansson (16 saves / 19 shots)		**Goalie stats**	David Rautio (25 saves / 25 shots)

20 March	**Brynäs IF**	**3–2**	Linköpings HC	Gavlerinken Arena	Recap
No scoring		**First period**	No scoring
Linus Ölund 1 – 2:21		**Second period**	3:13 – Marcel Mueller 1; 10:02 – Broc Little 1
Jonathan Pudas 1 – 3:28; Simon Bertilsson 1 – 5:33		**Third period**	No scoring
David Rautio (30 saves / 32 shots)		**Goalie stats**	Marcus Högberg (21 saves / 24 shots)

22 March	**Linköpings HC**	**2–1**	Brynäs IF	Saab Arena	Recap
No scoring		**First period**	No scoring
Marcel Mueller 2 – 1:48		**Second period**	15:42 – pp – Linus Ölund 2
Ken André Olimb 1 – pp – 14:03		**Third period**	No scoring
Marcus Högberg (19 saves / 20 shots)		**Goalie stats**	David Rautio (26 saves / 28 shots)

24 March	**Brynäs IF**	1–0	**2OT**	Linköpings HC	Gavlerinken Arena	Recap
No scoring		First period		No scoring
No scoring		Second period		No scoring
No scoring		Third period		No scoring
Simon Bertilsson 2 – 15:56		Second overtime period		No scoring
David Rautio (37 saves / 37 shots)		Goalie stats		Marcus Högberg (47 saves / 48 shots)

26 March	**Linköpings HC**	3–2	**OT**	Brynäs IF	Saab Arena	Recap
No scoring		First period		No scoring
Andrew Gordon 1 – pp2 – 18:36		Second period		11:13 – Daniel Paille 2; 15:32 – Daniel Paille 3
Emil Kristensen 1 – 11:52		Third period		No scoring
Henrik Törnqvist 1 – 6:07		First overtime period		No scoring
Marcus Högberg (36 saves / 38 shots)		Goalie stats		David Rautio (19 saves / 22 shots)

28 March	**Brynäs IF**	**6–0**	Linköpings HC	Gavlerinken Arena	Recap
No scoring		**First period**	No scoring
Daniel Paille 3 – 1:55; Kevin Clark 1 – 10:11; Ponthus Vesterholm 1 – 11:00; Oskar Lindblom 1 – 16:09		**Second period**	No scoring
Johan Alcén 1 – 7:51; Pathrik Vesterholm 1 – pp – 17:24		**Third period**	No scoring
David Rautio (27 saves / 27 shots)		**Goalie stats**	Marcus Högberg (15 saves / 19 shots); Jacob Johansson (5 saves / 7 shots)

**Brynäs IF won series 4–2**

=== Semi-finals ===
==== (2) HV71 vs. (8) Malmö Redhawks ====
1 April	**HV71**	**5–2**	Malmö Redhawks	Kinnarps Arena	Recap
No scoring		**First period**	15:24 – pp – Andreas Thuresson 4
Filip Sandberg 3 – 5:43		**Second period**	8:09 – Robin Álvarez 4
Lias Andersson 1 – 2:56; Chris Abbott 1 – 6:03; Ted Brithén 2 – 7:56; Oscar Sundh 1 – 16:28		**Third period**	No scoring
Linus Söderström (20 saves / 22 shots)		**Goalie stats**	Oscar Alsenfelt (29 saves / 34 shots)

3 April	**Malmö Redhawks**	3–2	**OT**	HV71	Malmö Arena	Recap
Carl-Johan Lerby 1 – 14:41		First period		4:49 – Kevin Stenlund 1
No scoring		Second period		No scoring
Robin Álvarez 5 – pp – 11:26		Third period		13:45 – Oscar Sundh 2
Nichlas Hardt 4 – pp – 12:28		First overtime period		No scoring
Oscar Alsenfelt (39 saves / 41 shots)		Goalie stats		Linus Söderström (29 saves / 32 shots)

5 April	**HV71**	**5–1**	Malmö Redhawks	Kinnarps Arena	Recap
Lias Andersson 2 – 13:04; Erik Christensen 1 – pp – 15:30		**First period**	No scoring
Filip Sandberg 4 – pp – 10:27		**Second period**	19:55 – Fredrik Händemark 2
Filip Sandberg 5 – 8:17; Oscar Sundh 3 – 10:12		**Third period**	No scoring
Linus Söderström (27 saves / 28 shots)		**Goalie stats**	Cristopher Nihlstorp (28 saves / 33 shots)

7 April	Malmö Redhawks	**2–4**	**HV71**	Malmö Arena	Recap
Frederik Storm 4 – 0:15; Erik Forssell 1 – 2:15		**First period**	No scoring
No scoring		**Second period**	16:11 – pp – Lias Andersson 3
No scoring		**Third period**	6:56 – Andreas Borgman 2; 9:40 – Ted Brithén 3; 11:07 – Adam Almqvist 1
Oscar Alsenfelt (24 saves / 28 shots)		**Goalie stats**	Linus Söderström (22 saves / 24 shots)

9 April	**HV71**	**4–2**	Malmö Redhawks	Kinnarps Arena	Recap
Kevin Stenlund 2 – 10:04		**First period**	No scoring
Simon Önerud 4 – 6:31; Simon Önerud 5 – 10:22		**Second period**	1:09 – Lukas Haudum 1; 18:45 – pp – Fredrik Händemark 3
Filip Sandberg 6 – sh – 2:19		**Third period**	No scoring
Linus Söderström (25 saves / 27 shots)		**Goalie stats**	Oscar Alsenfelt (22 saves / 26 shots)

**HV71 won series 4–1**

==== (3) Frölunda HC vs. (5) Brynäs IF ====
2 April	Frölunda HC	**3–4**	**Brynäs IF**	Scandinavium	Recap
No scoring		**First period**	2:58 – pp – Daniel Paille 4
No scoring		**Second period**	9:36 – pp – Juuso Ikonen 1; 11:49 – pp – Kevin Clark 2; 15:13 – Jacob Blomqvist 2
Sebastian Stålberg 1 – 12:39; Joel Lundqvist 2 – pp – 18:55; Casey Wellman 2 – pp – 19:42		**Third period**	No scoring
Johan Gustafsson (12 saves / 16 shots); Dan Bakala (5 saves / 5 shots)		**Goalie stats**	Felix Sandström (34 saves / 37 shots)

4 April	Brynäs IF	**1–6**	**Frölunda HC**	Gavlerinken Arena	Recap
No scoring		**First period**	19:48 – pp – Casey Wellman 3
Jonathan Granström 1 – 18:19		**Second period**	11:15 – Patrik Carlsson 1; 13:28 – Rasmus Dahlin 2
No scoring		**Third period**	3:49 – Casey Wellman 4; 10:56 – Victor Olofsson 3; 19:26 – pp – Casey Wellman 5
Felix Sandström (22 saves / 28 shots)		**Goalie stats**	Johan Gustafsson (23 saves / 24 shots)

6 April	**Frölunda HC**	**6–3**	Brynäs IF	Scandinavium	Recap
Casey Wellman 6 – pp – 1:49; Mats Rosseli Olsen 1 – 15:22; Simon Hjalmarsson 4 – 17:14		**First period**	6:41 – Simon Bertilsson 3; 16:49 – pp – Juuso Ikonen 2
Simon Hjalmarsson 5 – 7:43; Sean Bergenheim 1 – 9:39		**Second period**	No scoring
Casey Wellman 7 – pp – 8:33		**Third period**	16:04 – Kevin Clark 3
Johan Gustafsson (17 saves / 20 shots)		**Goalie stats**	David Rautio (3 saves / 6 shots); Felix Sandström (24 saves / 27 shots)

8 April	**Brynäs IF**	**4–3**	Frölunda HC	Gavlerinken Arena	Recap
Kevin Clark 4 – pp – 7:29		**First period**	9:22 – Casey Wellman 8; 16:20 – pp – Johan Sundström 1
Kevin Clark 5 – 5:28		**Second period**	No scoring
Linus Ölund 3 – 8:29; Kevin Clark 6 – 19:01		**Third period**	13:25 – Simon Hjalmarsson 6
Felix Sandström (17 saves / 20 shots)		**Goalie stats**	Johan Gustafsson (36 saves / 50 shots)

10 April	**Frölunda HC**	**4–0**	Brynäs IF	Scandinavium	Recap
No scoring		**First period**	No scoring
Victor Olofsson 4 – 15:18		**Second period**	No scoring
Rasmus Dahlin 3 – 11:21; Casey Wellman 9 – ps – 13:10; John Nyberg 1 – 18:03		**Third period**	No scoring
Johan Gustafsson (21 saves / 21 shots)		**Goalie stats**	Felix Sandström (23 saves / 27 shots)

12 April	**Brynäs IF**	**6–0**	Frölunda HC	Gavlerinken Arena	Recap
Pathrik Vesterholm 2 – 8:40; Kevin Clark 7 – pp – 15:34; Tomáš Záborský 1 – 16:15		**First period**	No scoring
Kevin Clark 8 – 3:00; Kevin Clark 9 – 5:20		**Second period**	No scoring
Jonathan Granström 2 – 19:58		**Third period**	No scoring
Felix Sandström (32 saves / 32 shots)		**Goalie stats**	Johan Gustafsson (7 saves / 12 shots); Dan Bakala (12 saves / 13 shots)

14 April	Frölunda HC	**1–3**	**Brynäs IF**	Scandinavium	Recap
No scoring		**First period**	0:52 – pp – Juuso Ikonen 3; 11:42 – Oskar Lindblom 2
Patrik Carlsson 2 – 13:40		**Second period**	No scoring
No scoring		**Third period**	0:56 – Oskar Lindblom 3
Johan Gustafsson (15 saves / 18 shots)		**Goalie stats**	Felix Sandström (37 saves / 38 shots)

**Brynäs IF won series 4–3**

=== Finals ===
==== (2) HV71 vs. (5) Brynäs IF ====
16 April	**HV71**	**5–2**	Brynäs IF	Kinnarps Arena	Recap
Simon Önerud 6 – 0:29; Ted Brithén 4 – 12:02		**First period**	19:42 – pp – Oskar Lindblom 4
Mattias Tedenby 1 – 10:06		**Second period**	No scoring
Christoffer Törngren 1 – 9:42; Ted Brithén 5 – en – 18:26		**Third period**	8:26 – Linus Ölund 4
Linus Söderström (25 saves / 27 shots)		**Goalie stats**	Felix Sandström (26 saves / 30 shots)

18 April	**Brynäs IF**	3–2	**OT**	HV71	Gavlerinken Arena	Recap
Juuso Ikonen 4 – 1:49		First period		No scoring
No scoring		Second period		No scoring
Juuso Ikonen 5 – 1:49		Third period		3:23 – Martin Thörnberg 4; 18:19 – Martin Thörnberg 5
Linus Ölund 5 – 3:18		First overtime period		No scoring
Felix Sandström (14 saves / 16 shots)		Goalie stats		Linus Söderström (29 saves / 32 shots)

20 April	HV71	3–4	**OT**	**Brynäs IF**	Kinnarps Arena	Recap
No scoring		First period		3:51 – pp – Jacob Blomqvist 3
Kevin Stenlund 3 – 11:24; Mattias Tedenby 2 – 14:56		Second period		13:32 – sh – Jacob Blomqvist 4; 16:20 – Daniel Paille 5
Martin Thörnberg 6 – 15:03		Third period		No scoring
No scoring		First overtime period		6:45 – Tomáš Záborský 2
Linus Söderström (23 saves / 27 shots)		Goalie stats		David Rautio (34 saves / 37 shots)

22 April	Brynäs IF	**4–6**	**HV71**	Gavlerinken Arena	Recap
No scoring		**First period**	No scoring
Tomáš Záborský 3 – 13:53		**Second period**	18:24 – Kevin Stenlund 4
Juuso Ikonen 6 – 0:21; Tomáš Záborský 4 – 9:25; Jacob Blomqvist 5 – 19:35		**Third period**	4:51 – pp – Simon Önerud 7; 12:46 – Simon Önerud 8; 14:06 – Lias Andersson 4; 17:41 – Lawrence Pilut 2; 19:54 – en – Anton Bengtsson 1
David Rautio (21 saves / 26 shots)		**Goalie stats**	Linus Söderström (30 saves / 34 shots)

24 April	HV71	**0–2**	**Brynäs IF**	Kinnarps Arena	Recap
No scoring		**First period**	No scoring
No scoring		**Second period**	19:33 – Elias Fälth 1
No scoring		**Third period**	19:56 – en – Johan Alcén 2
Linus Söderström (23 saves / 24 shots)		**Goalie stats**	Felix Sandström (24 saves / 24 shots)

27 April	Brynäs IF	**3–5**	**HV71**	Gavlerinken Arena	Recap
No scoring		**First period**	5:35 – pp – Kristofer Berglund 1; 9:10 – Simon Önerud 9; 11:06 – sh – Anton Bengtsson 2
No scoring		**Second period**	10:13 – pp – Mattias Tedenby 3
Jesper Jensen 3 – pp – 12:25; Juuso Ikonen 7 – pp – 13:15; Linus Ölund 6 – 18:37		**Third period**	19:43 – en – Oscar Sundh 4
Felix Sandström (3 saves / 5 shots); David Rautio (24 saves / 26 shots)		**Goalie stats**	Linus Söderström (32 saves / 35 shots)

29 April	**HV71**	2–1	**OT**	Brynäs IF	Kinnarps Arena	Recap
No scoring		First period		12:55 – Jacob Blomqvist 6
No scoring		Second period		No scoring
Christoffer Törngren 2 – 3:07		Third period		No scoring
Simon Önerud 10 – 11:01		First overtime period		No scoring
Linus Söderström (29 saves / 30 shots)		Goalie stats		David Rautio (37 saves / 39 shots)

**HV71 won series 4–3**

=== Statistics ===
==== Playoff scoring leaders ====
List shows the ten best skaters based on the number of points during the playoffs. If two or more skaters are tied (i.e. same number of points, goals and played games), all of the tied skaters are shown. Updated as of April 29, 2017.
GP = Games played; G = Goals; A = Assists; Pts = Points; +/– = Plus/minus; PIM = Penalty minutes

Player	Team	GP	G	A	Pts	+/–	PIM
(Canada) Kevin Clark	Brynäs IF	20	9	8	17	+3	10
(United States) Casey Wellman	Frölunda HC	14	9	7	16	+4	6
(Sweden) Filip Sandberg	HV71	16	6	8	14	+6	4
(Sweden) Oskar Lindblom	Brynäs IF	20	4	10	14	0	10
(Sweden) Simon Önerud	HV71	16	10	3	13	+5	6
(Finland) Juuso Ikonen	Brynäs IF	20	7	5	12	–5	0
(Sweden) Victor Olofsson	Frölunda HC	14	4	8	12	+4	0
(Sweden) Joel Lundqvist	Frölunda HC	14	2	10	12	+6	6
(Sweden) Martin Thörnberg	HV71	14	6	5	11	+10	2
(Denmark) Nichlas Hardt	Malmö Redhawks	13	4	7	11	0	6

==== Playoff leading goaltenders ====
These are the leaders in GAA and save percentage among goaltenders who played at least 40% of the team's minutes. The table is sorted by GAA, and the criteria for inclusion are bolded. Updated as of April 29, 2017.

GP = Games played; TOI = Time on ice (minutes); GA = Goals against; SO = Shutouts; Sv% = Save percentage; GAA = Goals against average

Player	Team	GP	TOI	GA	SO	Sv%	GAA
(Finland) Joni Ortio	Skellefteå AIK	7	439:42	13	1	**93.26**	**1.77**
(Sweden) David Rautio	Brynäs IF	11	658:15	22	3	**92.79**	**2.01**
(Sweden) Linus Söderström	HV71	16	993:11	35	0	**92.17**	**2.11**
(Sweden) Joacim Eriksson	Växjö Lakers	5	304:41	12	1	**91.78**	**2.36**
(Sweden) Marcus Högberg	Linköpings HC	6	340:13	14	0	**91.52**	**2.47**

== SHL awards ==
Guldhjälmen: Joakim Lindström, Skellefteå AIK
Guldpucken: Erik Karlsson, Ottawa Senators
Honken Trophy: Oscar Alsenfelt, Malmö Redhawks
Håkan Loob Trophy: Kevin Clark, Brynäs IF
Rookie of the Year: Andreas Borgman, HV71
Salming Trophy: Henrik Tömmernes, Frölunda HC
Stefan Liv Memorial Trophy: Simon Önerud, HV71
Guldpipan: Mikael Nord

== See also ==
- List of SHL seasons
- 2016 in ice hockey
- 2017 in ice hockey
