= Tomáš Záborský =

Slovak ice hockey player

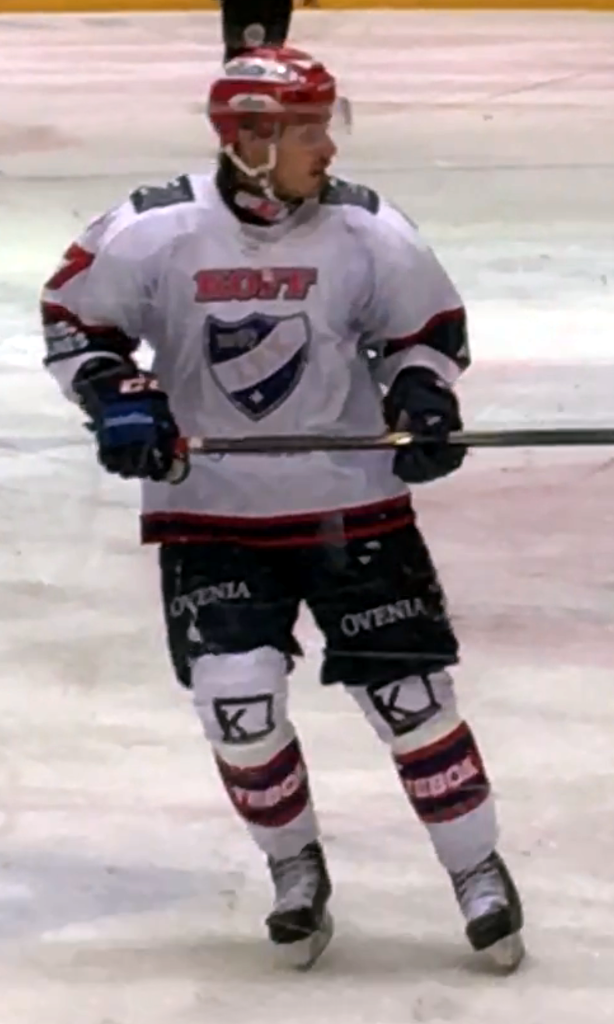
- Born: 14 November 1987 (age 38) Trenčín, Czechoslovakia
- Height: 6 ft 0 in (183 cm)
- Weight: 195 lb (88 kg; 13 st 13 lb)
- Position: Left wing
- Shoots: Left
- Slovak team Former teams: Dukla Trenčín; Hartford Wolf Pack; Ässät; Avangard Omsk; Salavat Yulaev Ufa; HIFK; Brynäs IF; Tappara; SaiPa; HC Bílí Tygři Liberec; Schwenninger Wild Wings; HK Poprad
- National team: Slovakia
- NHL draft: 137th overall, 2006; New York Rangers
- Playing career: 2008–present

Tomáš Záborský (born 14 November 1987) is a Slovak professional ice hockey left winger currently playing for HK Dukla Trenčín of the Slovak Extraliga.

== Playing career ==
Drafted in the 5th round, 137th overall by the New York Rangers in the 2006 NHL entry draft, in the 2006 CHL Import Draft, Zaborsky was selected 36th overall by the Saginaw Spirit.

He spent his entire OHL career with the Saginaw Spirit. Zaborsky has also played professionally in Slovakia with HC Dukla Trenčín. He has played in the ECHL for the Charlotte Checkers and Dayton Bombers, and spent time in the AHL with the Hartford Wolfpack, the New York Rangers' AHL affiliate. Since the 2009–2010 he is playing in Pori, Finland, playing for Ässät. Zaborsky was named the European Hockey Player of the Month by eurohockey.com in September 2011. In 2012, he signed a two-year contract with Avangard Omsk.

On 26 April 2019, Záborský left Tappara after two seasons and opted to continue his professional career in the Liiga, agreeing to a two-year contract as a free agent with SaiPa.

== Career statistics ==
=== Regular season and playoffs ===
			Regular season					Playoffs
Season	Team	League	GP	G	A	Pts	PIM	GP	G	A	Pts	PIM
2003–04	Dukla Trenčín	SVK U18	46	20	12	32	8	7	4	2	6	4
2004–05	Dukla Trenčín	SVK U18	46	44	25	69	53	7	4	4	8	39
2004–05	Dukla Trenčín	SVK U20	7	1	2	3	0	1	0	1	1	0
2005–06	Dukla Trenčín	SVK U20	42	39	22	61	18	7	10	5	15	2
2005–06	Dukla Trenčín	Slovak	4	0	0	0	2	—	—	—	—	—
2005–06	HK 95 Považská Bystrica	SVK.2	5	0	1	1	2	—	—	—	—	—
2006–07	Saginaw Spirit	OHL	59	19	24	43	18	6	1	2	3	4
2007–08	Saginaw Spirit	OHL	68	31	39	70	42	4	2	1	3	2
2007–08	Hartford Wolf Pack	AHL	2	0	1	1	0	—	—	—	—	—
2008–09	Charlotte Checkers	ECHL	28	4	8	12	14	—	—	—	—	—
2008–09	Dayton Bombers	ECHL	19	10	6	16	14	—	—	—	—	—
2008–09	Hartford Wolf Pack	AHL	8	1	2	3	2	—	—	—	—	—
2009–10	Ässät	SM-liiga	43	9	17	26	67	—	—	—	—	—
2010–11	Ässät	SM-liiga	47	23	10	33	6	6	0	0	0	0
2011–12	Ässät	SM-liiga	52	35	24	59	41	—	—	—	—	—
2012–13	Avangard Omsk	KHL	52	21	20	41	18	12	2	2	4	6
2013–14	Avangard Omsk	KHL	14	4	3	7	2	—	—	—	—	—
2013–14	Salavat Yulaev Ufa	KHL	31	8	5	13	4	7	1	0	1	4
2014–15	HIFK	Liiga	60	15	32	47	18	8	4	4	8	16
2015–16	HIFK	Liiga	55	27	21	48	55	17	3	7	10	26
2016–17	Brynäs IF	SHL	12	2	2	4	2	11	4	2	6	2
2017–18	Tappara	Liiga	58	10	13	23	8	16	2	6	8	6
2018–19	Tappara	Liiga	47	17	17	34	20	11	4	3	7	4
2019–20	SaiPa	Liiga	53	19	22	41	39	—	—	—	—	—
2020–21	SaiPa	Liiga	53	15	26	41	18	—	—	—	—	—
2021–22	Bílí Tygři Liberec	ELH	11	2	0	2	2	—	—	—	—	—
2021–22	Schwenninger Wild Wings	DEL	41	13	14	27	6	—	—	—	—	—
2022–23	HK Poprad	Slovak	50	20	24	44	14	3	0	0	0	4
2023–24	HK Poprad	Slovak	34	20	9	29	12	6	1	1	2	2
Liiga totals			468	170	182	352	272	58	13	20	33	52
KHL totals			97	33	28	61	24	19	3	2	5	10

=== International ===
Year	Team	Event	Result	GP	G	A	Pts	PIM
2007	Slovakia	WJC	8th	6	1	2	3	4
2013	Slovakia	WC	8th	8	4	2	6	4
2014	Slovakia	OG	11th	3	0	1	1	0
Junior totals				6	1	2	3	4
Senior totals				11	4	3	7	4

== Transactions ==
- 24 June 2006 – Drafted in the 5th round, 137th overall by the New York Rangers in the 2006 NHL entry draft
- 19 July 2010 – Traded from the New York Rangers to the Anaheim Ducks for Defenseman Matt McCue
