= Andreas Borgman =

Swedish ice hockey player

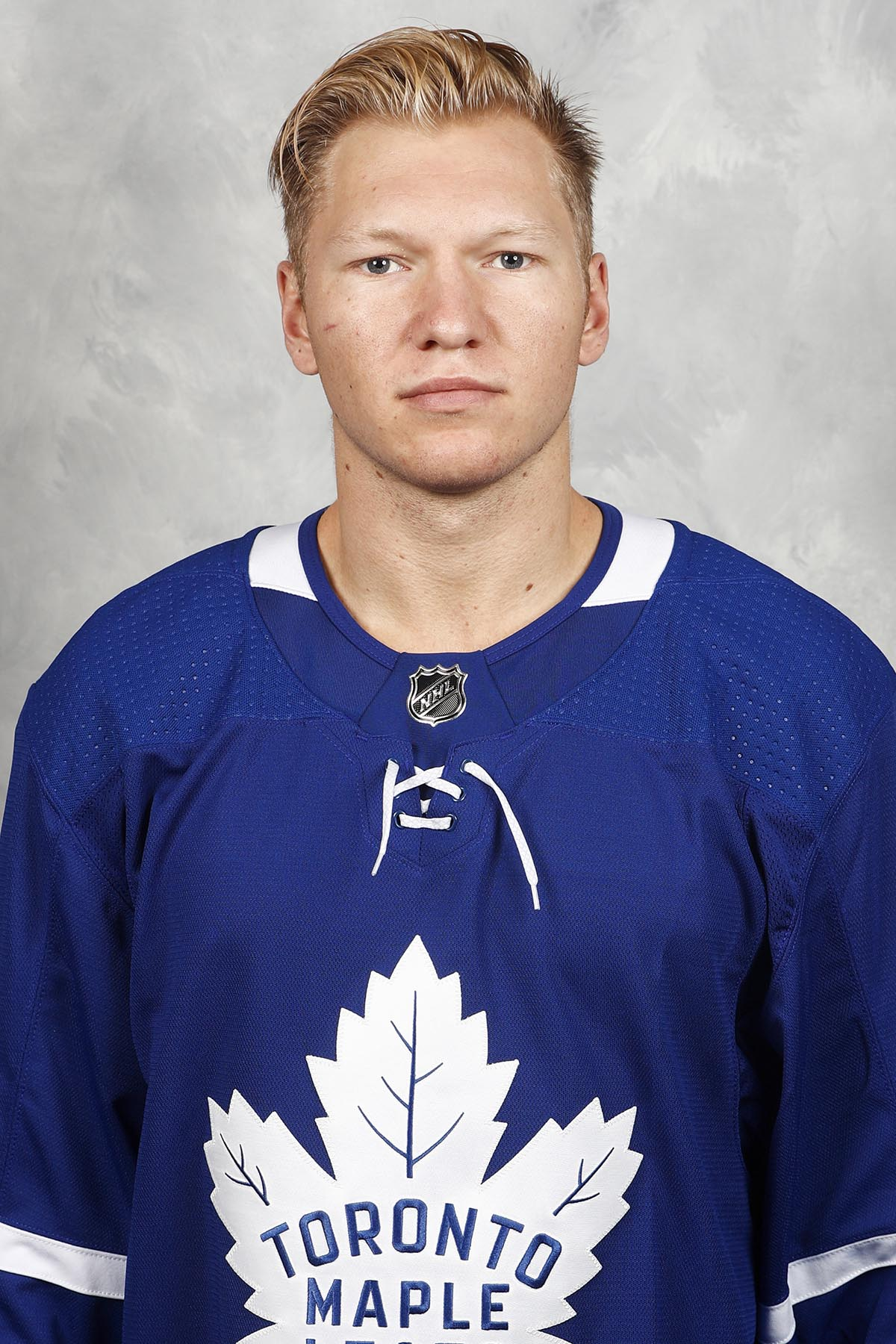
- Borgman with the Toronto Maple Leafs in 2017
- Born: 18 June 1995 (age 31) Stockholm, Sweden
- Height: 6 ft 0 in (183 cm)
- Weight: 212 lb (96 kg; 15 st 2 lb)
- Position: Defence
- Shoots: Left
- NL team Former teams: HV71: Timrå IK; Toronto Maple Leafs; Ässät; Tampa Bay Lightning; Frölunda HC; HC Fribourg-Gottéron
- NHL draft: Undrafted
- Playing career: 2013–present

Andreas Borgman (born 18 June 1995) is a Swedish professional ice hockey defenceman currently playing with HV71 in the Swedish Hockey League (SHL). Borgman was the recipient of the Swedish Hockey League Rookie of the Year honours for his achievements during the 2016–17 season.

== Playing career ==
Borgman made his Elitserien debut playing with Timrå IK during the 2012–13 Elitserien season, playing three Elitserien games that season.

After spending the 2015–16 season in the Allsvenskan with VIK Västerås HK, Borgman returned to the SHL in signing a two-year contract with HV71 on 31 March 2016. In his debut season with HV71 in the 2016–17 season, Borgman appeared in 45 regular season games from the blueline collecting 15 points. In the post-season, Borgman co-led the league in scoring amongst defenseman with 2 goals and 10 points in 14 games, helping HV71 claim the Le Mat Trophy. In addition to the championship, Borgman was selected as the SHL's Rookie of the Year.

On 16 May 2017, Borgman was signed a two-year, entry-level contract with the Toronto Maple Leafs, alongside fellow Swedish defenceman Calle Rosén.

Borgman scored his first NHL point against the Winnipeg Jets on 4 October 2017. He scored his first NHL goal against San Jose Sharks' Martin Jones on 30 October 2017. The goal was originally awarded to teammate Nazem Kadri, with Borgman picking up his third official assist, but it was later awarded back to Borgman. It was assured to fans on the Leafs PR Twitter that Borgman got his first NHL goal puck. On 5 February 2018, Borgman was loaned to the Toronto Marlies of the American Hockey League (AHL) after teammate Roman Polák was activated from the injured reserve.

On 25 July 2019, Borgman was traded by the Maple Leafs to reigning champions the St. Louis Blues in exchange for Jordan Schmaltz. Unable to make the Blues roster out of training camp, Borgman was assigned for the duration of the 2019–20 season to AHL affiliate, the San Antonio Rampage. In 53 games with the Rampage, Borgman added 2 goals and 16 points.

With the COVID-19 pandemic concluding his contract with the St. Louis Blues, Borgman returned to Europe by agreeing to a one-year contract with Finnish club, Ässät of the Liiga, on 1 September 2020. His contract included an NHL-out clause through to December 2020. While in Finland, Borgman was signed by the newly crowned Stanley Cup champions, the Tampa Bay Lightning, on a one-year, two-way contract on 9 October 2020. In the shortened 2020–21 season, Borgman split the season between the Lightning and AHL affiliate, the Syracuse Crunch, he featured in 7 regular season games, collecting two assists. He was on the extended black aces squad as the Lightning claimed back-to-back Stanley Cups.

As a free agent from the Lightning, Borgman was signed to a one-year, two-way contract with the Dallas Stars on 28 July 2021. After attending the Stars training camp, Borgman was reassigned to begin the 2021–22 season in the AHL with affiliate, the Texas Stars. As an alternate captain, Borgman added 3 goals and 5 points through 14 games before his contract was mutually terminated with the Dallas Stars in order to return to his native Sweden on 15 December 2021.

In his return to the SHL, Borgman was signed to a long-term five-year contract with Frölunda HC on 17 December 2021.

After two seasons playing in Switzerland with HC Fribourg-Gottéron, Borgman returned to Sweden and HV71, signing a three-year contract on 22 April 2025.

== Career statistics ==
=== Regular season and playoffs ===
| | | | Regular season | | | | | Playoffs |
| Season | Team | League | GP | G | A | Pts | PIM | GP | G | A | Pts | PIM |
|---|---|---|---|---|---|---|---|---|---|---|---|---|
| 2011–12 | Timrå IK | J20 | 1 | 0 | 0 | 0 | 0 | — | — | — | — | — |
| 2012–13 | Timrå IK | J20 | 38 | 8 | 13 | 21 | 72 | 2 | 0 | 0 | 0 | 0 |
| 2012–13 | Timrå IK | SEL | 3 | 0 | 0 | 0 | 0 | — | — | — | — | — |
| 2013–14 | Timrå IK | J20 | 33 | 5 | 18 | 23 | 84 | 2 | 0 | 0 | 0 | 6 |
| 2013–14 | Timrå IK | Allsv | 18 | 0 | 0 | 0 | 2 | — | — | — | — | — |
| 2013–14 | Kovlands IF | Div.1 | 1 | 0 | 0 | 0 | 0 | — | — | — | — | — |
| 2014–15 | Timrå IK | J20 | 7 | 0 | 2 | 2 | 10 | 2 | 0 | 1 | 1 | 2 |
| 2014–15 | Timrå IK | Allsv | 46 | 2 | 4 | 6 | 45 | — | — | — | — | — |
| 2015–16 | VIK Västerås HK | Allsv | 52 | 5 | 11 | 16 | 44 | — | — | — | — | — |
| 2016–17 | HV71 | SHL | 45 | 5 | 10 | 15 | 26 | 14 | 2 | 8 | 10 | 6 |
| 2017–18 | Toronto Maple Leafs | NHL | 48 | 3 | 8 | 11 | 28 | — | — | — | — | — |
| 2017–18 | Toronto Marlies | AHL | 25 | 4 | 5 | 9 | 23 | 2 | 0 | 0 | 0 | 2 |
| 2018–19 | Toronto Marlies | AHL | 45 | 4 | 13 | 17 | 43 | 13 | 1 | 1 | 2 | 6 |
| 2019–20 | San Antonio Rampage | AHL | 53 | 2 | 14 | 16 | 42 | — | — | — | — | — |
| 2020–21 | Ässät | Liiga | 19 | 3 | 10 | 13 | 26 | — | — | — | — | — |
| 2020–21 | Syracuse Crunch | AHL | 12 | 3 | 2 | 5 | 8 | — | — | — | — | — |
| 2020–21 | Tampa Bay Lightning | NHL | 7 | 0 | 2 | 2 | 4 | — | — | — | — | — |
| 2021–22 | Texas Stars | AHL | 14 | 3 | 2 | 5 | 10 | — | — | — | — | — |
| 2021–22 | Frölunda HC | SHL | 24 | 7 | 13 | 20 | 47 | 8 | 2 | 5 | 7 | 2 |
| 2022–23 | Frölunda HC | SHL | 26 | 2 | 11 | 13 | 31 | — | — | — | — | — |
| 2023–24 | HC Fribourg-Gottéron | NL | 51 | 6 | 19 | 25 | 20 | 12 | 1 | 1 | 2 | 8 |
| 2024–25 | HC Fribourg-Gottéron | NL | 36 | 1 | 4 | 5 | 25 | 6 | 0 | 1 | 1 | 27 |
| SHL totals | | | 98 | 14 | 34 | 48 | 104 | 22 | 4 | 13 | 17 | 8 |
| NHL totals | | | 55 | 3 | 10 | 13 | 32 | — | — | — | — | — |
| NL totals | | | 87 | 7 | 23 | 30 | 45 | 18 | 1 | 2 | 3 | 35 |

=== International ===
| Year | Team | Event | Result | GP | G | A | Pts | PIM |
|---|---|---|---|---|---|---|---|---|
| 2013 | Sweden | U18 | 5th | 5 | 0 | 1 | 1 | 6 |
| Junior totals | | | | 5 | 0 | 1 | 1 | 6 |

== Awards and honors ==
| Award | Year |
|---|---|
SHL
| Rookie of the Year | 2017 |
| Le Mat Trophy (HV71) | 2017 |
AHL
| Calder Cup (Toronto Marlies) | 2018 |

Awards and achievements
| Preceded by Ludvig Rensfeldt | Winner of the SHL Rookie of the Year award 2017 | Succeeded by Elias Pettersson |
