= Ted Brithén =

Swedish ice hockey player

- Born: November 25, 1990 (age 34); Danderyd, Sweden
- Height: 6 ft 2 in (188 cm)
- Weight: 198 lb (90 kg; 14 st 2 lb)
- Position: Forward
- Shot: Left
- Played for: HV71; SC Bern; Rögle BK
- NHL draft: Undrafted
- Playing career: 2009–2023

Ted Brithén (born November 25, 1990) is a Swedish former professional ice hockey forward. He last played with Rögle BK of the Swedish Hockey League (SHL).

== Playing career ==
He made his Elitserien (now the SHL) debut playing with Rögle BK during the 2009–10 Elitserien season.

In April 2014 he played his first 2 games with the Swedish National Team. In August 2014, he was promoted to be the captain of HV71, after the legendary Johan Davidsson, in which he served in the role for two seasons.

On March 23, 2020, Brithén agreed to a two-year deal with SC Bern of the National League through the 2021–22 season. Brithén was released by SC Bern on 13 February 2021, because of family reasons. He then immediately signed a five-year contract to return to Rögle BK.

== Awards and honors ==
| Award | Year |
|---|---|
SHL
| Le Mat Trophy (HV71) | 2017 |
