= Filip Sandberg =

Swedish professional ice hockey forward (born 1994)

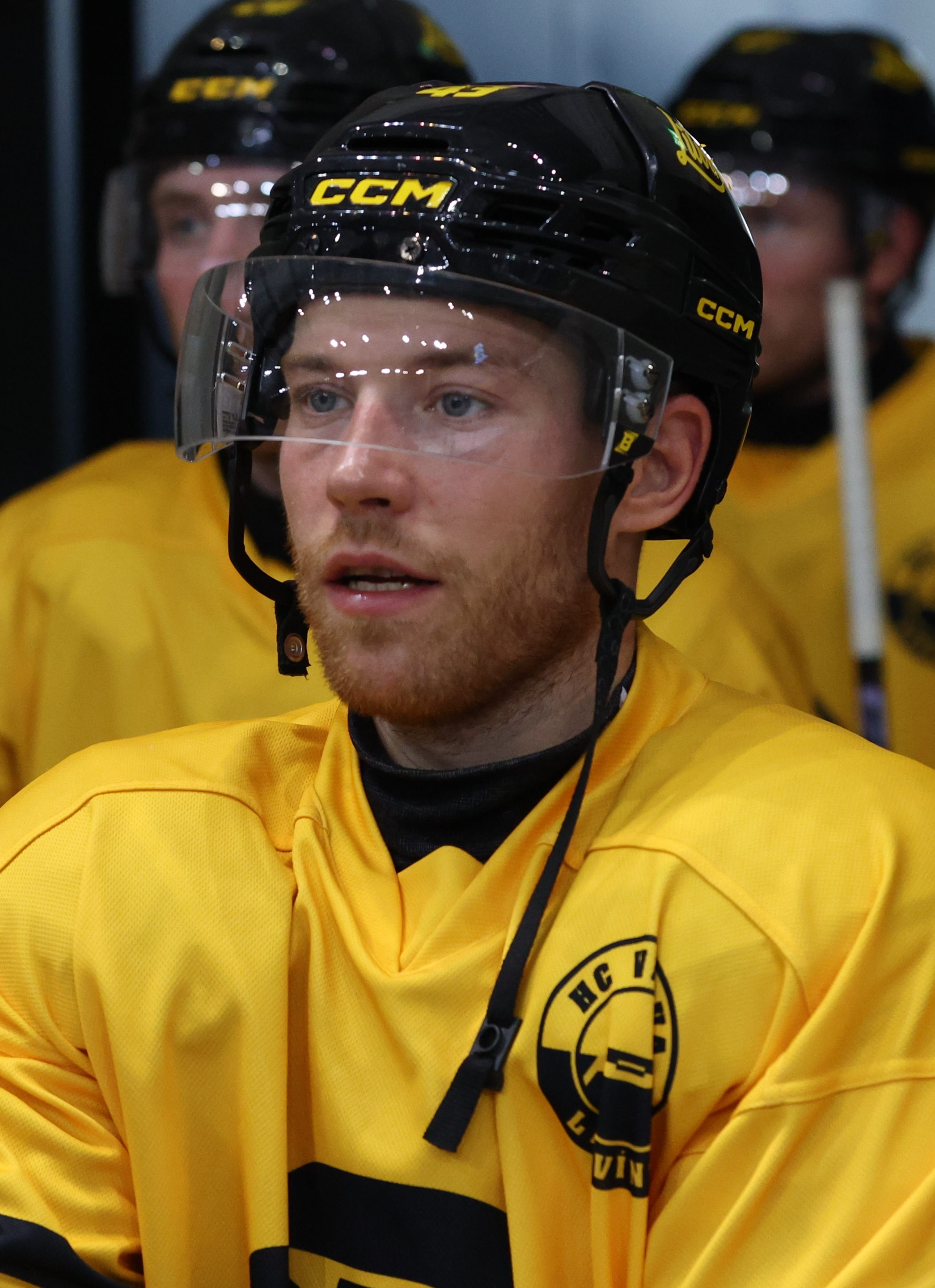
- Sandberg in 2024
- Born: July 23, 1994 (age 32) Järfälla, Sweden
- Height: 5 ft 9 in (175 cm)
- Weight: 181 lb (82 kg; 12 st 13 lb)
- Position: Forward
- Shoots: Right
- ELH team Former teams: HC Litvínov; HV71; TPS; Skellefteå AIK
- NHL draft: Undrafted
- Playing career: 2012–present

Filip Sandberg (born July 23, 1994) is a Swedish professional ice hockey forward who is currently playing for HC Litvínov of the Czech Extraliga (ELH).

== Playing career ==
He made his Swedish Hockey League debut playing with HV71 during the 2012–13 Elitserien season.

After five years in the SHL with HV71 and following the 2016–17 championship season, Sandberg as an undrafted free agent signed his first NHL contract, agreeing to a two-year, two-way contract with the San Jose Sharks on May 23, 2017. The contract was terminated on November 15, 2018, with Sandberg having played a total of 55 games for the San Jose Barracuda of the American Hockey League.

== Career statistics ==
=== Regular season and playoffs ===
			Regular season					Playoffs
Season	Team	League	GP	G	A	Pts	PIM	GP	G	A	Pts	PIM
2010–11	HV71	J20	29	2	7	9	12	5	0	0	0	0
2011–12	HV71	J20	43	14	20	34	48	6	1	1	2	6
2012–13	HV71	J20	33	24	29	53	20	7	3	5	8	4
2012–13	HV71	SEL	15	1	1	2	0	—	—	—	—	—
2013–14	HV71	J20	14	8	11	19	8	4	4	4	8	0
2013–14	HV71	SHL	30	1	4	5	8	8	0	0	0	0
2013–14	VIK Västerås HK	Allsv	10	1	2	3	2	—	—	—	—	—
2014–15	HV71	SHL	55	6	12	18	8	6	0	1	1	0
2015–16	HV71	SHL	52	9	12	21	14	6	1	2	3	2
2016–17	HV71	SHL	52	8	17	25	16	16	6	8	14	4
2017–18	San Jose Barracuda	AHL	45	7	7	14	16	2	0	0	0	0
2018–19	San Jose Barracuda	AHL	8	1	4	5	2	—	—	—	—	—
2018–19	HV71	SHL	3	0	0	0	2	—	—	—	—	—
2019–20	HV71	SHL	50	6	14	20	16	—	—	—	—	—
2020–21	HV71	SHL	52	16	14	30	14	—	—	—	—	—
2021–22	HC TPS	Liiga	31	4	8	12	6	—	—	—	—	—
2021–22	Skellefteå AIK	SHL	22	3	2	5	8	6	2	1	3	2
2022–23	Skellefteå AIK	SHL	52	11	16	27	14	17	3	4	7	6
2023–24	Skellefteå AIK	SHL	50	12	12	24	35	16	3	2	5	28
SHL totals			433	73	104	177	135	75	15	18	33	42

=== International ===
Year	Team	Event	Result	GP	G	A	Pts	PIM
2011	Sweden	IH18	2nd place, silver medalist(s)	5	0	0	0	4
2012	Sweden	U18	2nd place, silver medalist(s)	6	1	3	4	0
2013	Sweden	WJC	2nd place, silver medalist(s)	6	2	0	2	0
2014	Sweden	WJC	2nd place, silver medalist(s)	6	0	0	0	4
Junior totals				23	3	3	6	8

== Awards and honors ==
Award	Year
SHL
Le Mat Trophy (HV71)	2017
Le Mat Trophy (Skellefteå AIK)	2024
