= John Persson =

Swedish professional ice hockey player (born 1992)

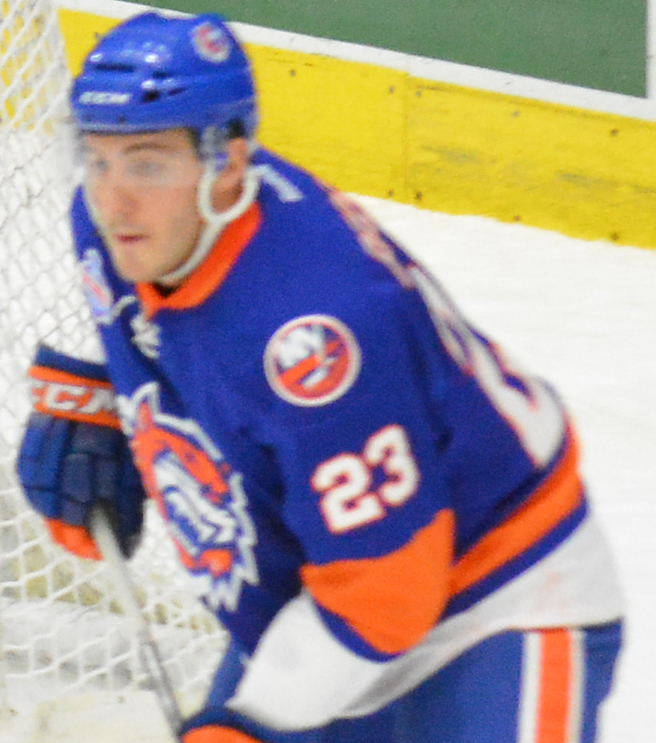
- Persson with the Bridgeport Sound Tigers in 2013
- Born: May 18, 1992 (age 34) Östersund, Sweden
- Height: 6 ft 2 in (188 cm)
- Weight: 212 lb (96 kg; 15 st 2 lb)
- Position: Left wing
- Shot: Left
- Played for: New York Islanders; Färjestad BK; Mora IK; SaiPa; Brynäs IF
- National team: Sweden
- NHL draft: 125th overall, 2011; New York Islanders
- Playing career: 2012–2021

John Persson (born May 18, 1992) is a Swedish former professional ice hockey player. He played in the National Hockey League (NHL) with the New York Islanders after he was selected by the Islanders in the 5th round (125th overall) of the 2011 NHL entry draft.

== Playing career ==
Persson played three seasons (2009–2012) of major junior hockey with the Red Deer Rebels of the Western Hockey League (WHL), scoring 63 goals and 67 assists for 130 points, while earning 102 penalty minutes, in 200 games played.

On May 29, 2012, the New York Islanders of the National Hockey League (NHL) signed Persson to a three-year entry-level contract.

During the 2013–14 season, Persson was recalled by the Islanders of the Sound Tigers and scored his first NHL goal on April 5, 2014 against Braden Holtby of the Washington Capitals.

On May 6, 2015, Persson opted to end his North American tenure within the Islanders organization and signed a two-year contract with Färjestad BK, re-uniting him with his brother Johan, of the SHL.

Following parts of two seasons with Brynäs IF, Persson announced his retirement from his ten year professional hockey career.

== Career statistics ==
			Regular season					Playoffs
Season	Team	League	GP	G	A	Pts	PIM	GP	G	A	Pts	PIM
2008–09	Mora IK	J20	12	4	2	6	12	—	—	—	—	—
2008–09	Mora IK	Allsv	3	0	0	0	0	—	—	—	—	—
2009–10	Red Deer Rebels	WHL	62	7	4	11	12	2	0	0	0	2
2010–11	Red Deer Rebels	WHL	68	33	28	61	34	9	2	3	5	4
2011–12	Red Deer Rebels	WHL	70	23	35	58	36	—	—	—	—	—
2011–12	Bridgeport Sound Tigers	AHL	12	4	4	8	0	2	0	0	0	0
2012–13	Bridgeport Sound Tigers	AHL	65	17	12	29	25	—	—	—	—	—
2013–14	Bridgeport Sound Tigers	AHL	46	12	4	16	38	—	—	—	—	—
2013–14	New York Islanders	NHL	10	1	0	1	6	—	—	—	—	—
2014–15	Bridgeport Sound Tigers	AHL	54	11	10	21	28	—	—	—	—	—
2015–16	Färjestad BK	SHL	52	12	4	16	22	5	0	1	1	2
2016–17	Färjestad BK	SHL	52	6	7	13	28	7	2	2	4	2
2017–18	Mora IK	SHL	50	10	7	17	16	—	—	—	—	—
2018–19	Mora IK	SHL	27	9	2	11	12	—	—	—	—	—
2019–20	SaiPa	Liiga	39	10	5	15	33	—	—	—	—	—
2019–20	Brynäs IF	SHL	15	5	1	6	2	—	—	—	—	—
2020–21	Brynäs IF	SHL	12	3	1	4	8	—	—	—	—	—
NHL totals			10	1	0	1	6	—	—	—	—	—
SHL totals			208	45	22	67	88	12	2	3	5	4
