= Robin Álvarez =

Swedish ice hockey player

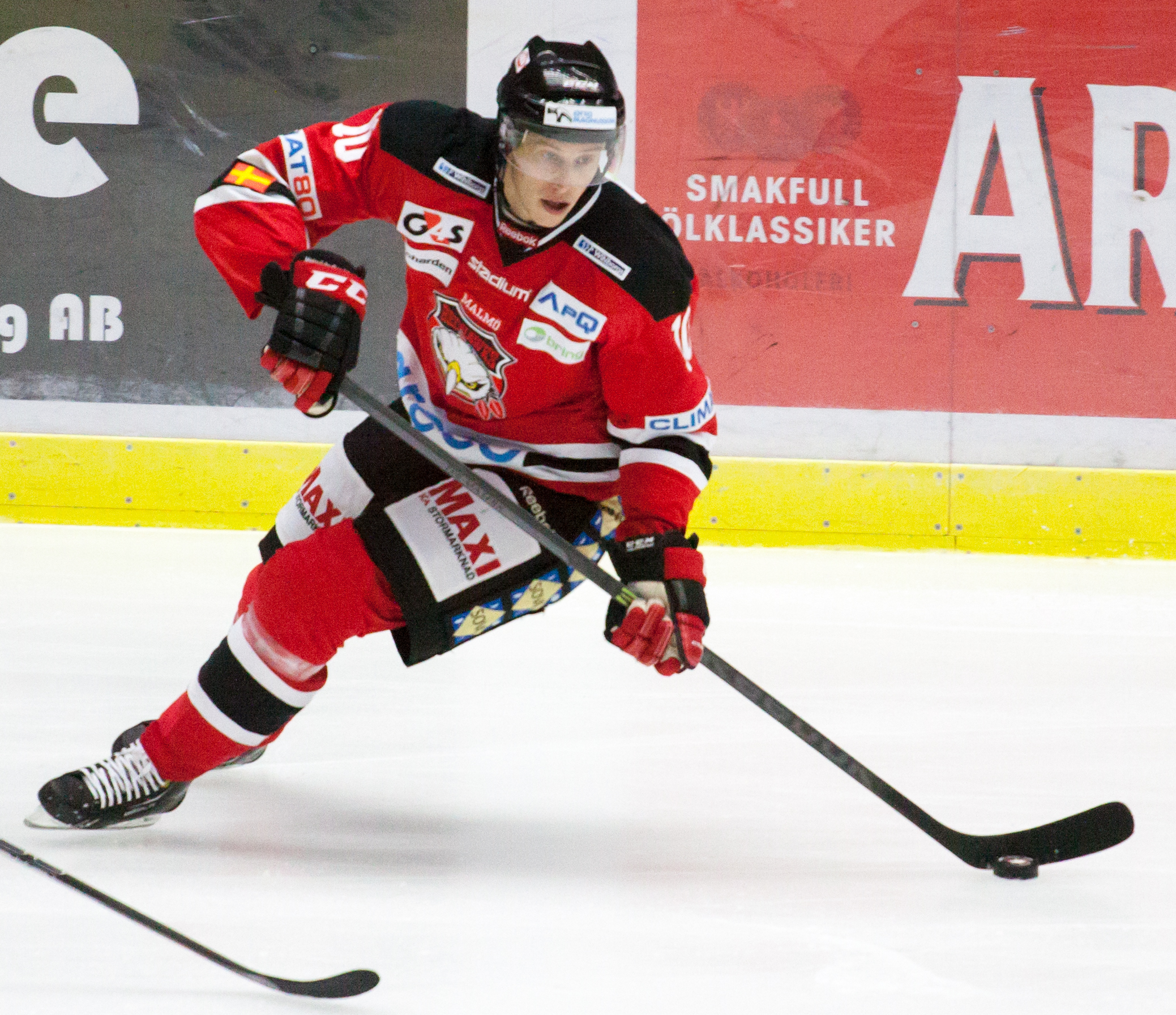
- Robin Alvarez in a home game versus Rögle.
- Born: 16 August 1987 (age 38) Malmö, Sweden
- Height: 6 ft 2 in (188 cm)
- Weight: 196 lb (89 kg; 14 st 0 lb)
- Position: Winger
- Shot: Left
- Played for: Malmö Redhawks; Djurgårdens IF; Skellefteå AIK; Frölunda HC; Timrå IK; Ilves
- Playing career: 2007–2024

Robin Álvarez (born 16 August 1987) is a Swedish former professional ice hockey winger who played in the Swedish Hockey League (SHL).

== Playing career ==
Álvarez started his career within the Malmö Redhawks at the under-18 level in 2004. In 2005 he played for Malmö's under-20 and by the 2007–08 season he was playing for the senior team in the HockeyAllsvenskan.

In the 2023–24 season, Álvarez began the campaign playing with Ilves in the Liiga, appearing in just 22 games before opting to return to play out his final professional year with original club, Malmö Redhawks of the SHL, on 27 January 2024.

== Career statistics ==
			Regular season					Playoffs
Season	Team	League	GP	G	A	Pts	PIM	GP	G	A	Pts	PIM
2004–05	Malmö Redhawks	J18	11	3	3	6	29	2	0	0	0	2
2005–06	Malmö Redhawks	J20	42	18	10	28	75	—	—	—	—	—
2006–07	Malmö Redhawks	J20	37	30	13	43	135	4	5	0	5	4
2006–07	IK Pantern	Div.1	4	3	0	3	0	—	—	—	—	—
2007–08	Malmö Redhawks	J20	3	1	0	1	0	—	—	—	—	—
2007–08	Malmö Redhawks	Allsv	41	6	6	12	20	10	0	0	0	4
2008–09	Malmö Redhawks	Allsv	45	10	8	18	26	—	—	—	—	—
2009–10	Malmö Redhawks	Allsv	25	3	10	13	22	—	—	—	—	—
2010–11	Malmö Redhawks	Allsv	52	13	24	37	56	—	—	—	—	—
2011–12	Malmö Redhawks	Allsv	49	8	10	18	57	6	3	0	3	0
2012–13	Malmö Redhawks	Allsv	49	23	12	35	34	—	—	—	—	—
2013–14	Malmö Redhawks	Allsv	46	17	12	29	38	9	5	0	5	2
2014–15	Djurgårdens IF	SHL	42	5	5	10	14	2	0	0	0	2
2015–16	Djurgårdens IF	SHL	49	14	10	24	34	8	3	0	3	10
2016–17	Malmö Redhawks	SHL	46	11	15	26	14	13	5	4	9	6
2017–18	Malmö Redhawks	SHL	34	9	4	13	20	10	2	2	4	10
2018–19	Skellefteå AIK	SHL	52	13	0	13	24	2	1	1	2	0
2019–20	Skellefteå AIK	SHL	50	14	15	29	30	—	—	—	—	—
2020–21	Frölunda HC	SHL	48	10	10	20	26	7	1	3	4	2
2021–22	Timrå IK	SHL	42	4	13	17	45	—	—	—	—	—
2022–23	Timrå IK	SHL	45	7	10	17	12	7	0	2	2	8
2023–24	Ilves	Liiga	22	0	2	2	8	—	—	—	—	—
2023–24	Malmö Redhawks	SHL	15	2	2	4	4	—	—	—	—	—
SHL totals			423	89	84	173	223	49	12	12	24	38
