= Juuso Ikonen =

Finnish ice hockey player

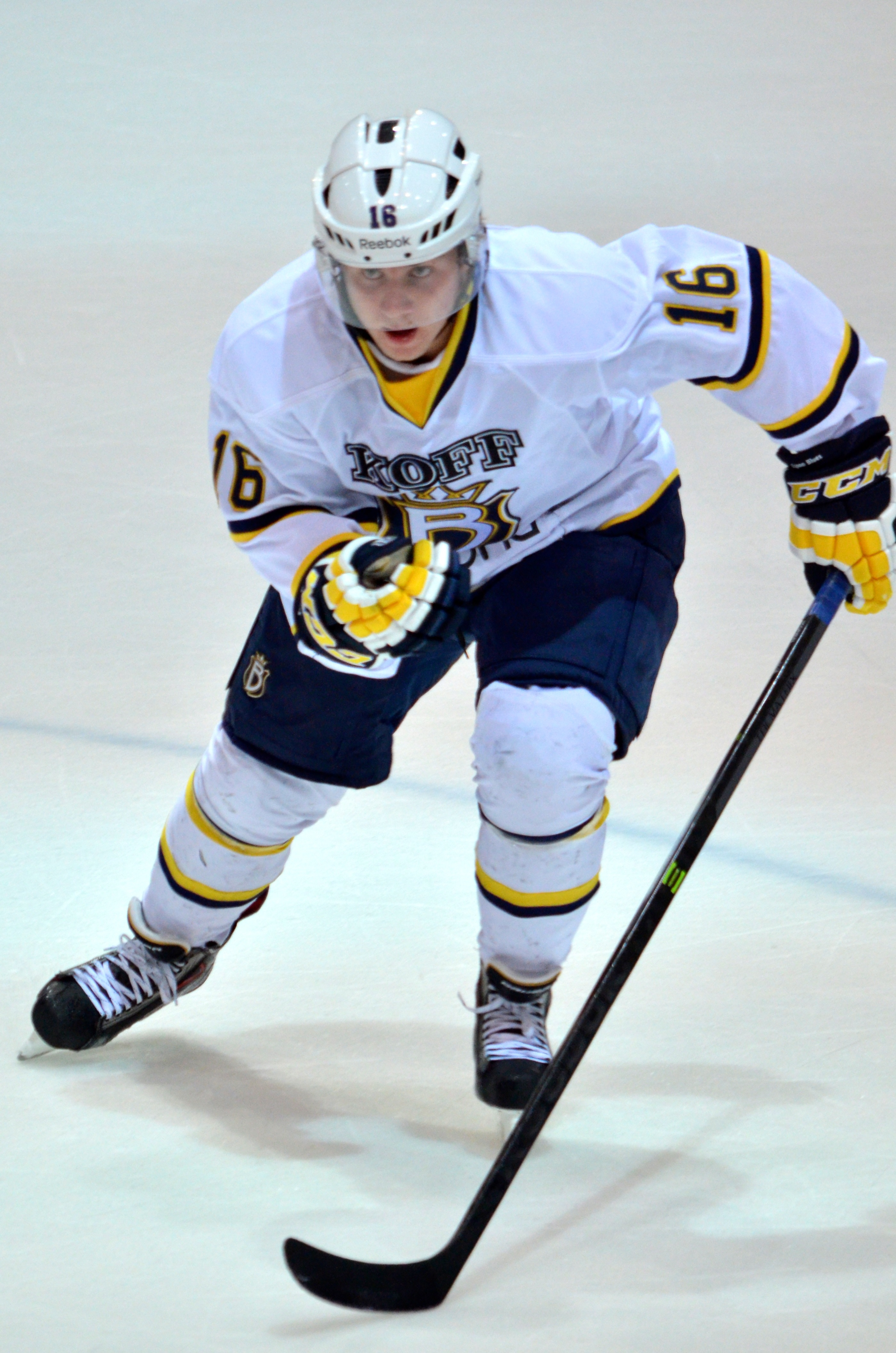
- Ikonen with the Espoo Blues
- Born: 3 January 1995 (age 31) Espoo, Finland
- Height: 5 ft 8 in (173 cm)
- Weight: 170 lb (77 kg; 12 st 2 lb)
- Position: Forward
- Shoots: Right
- Liiga team Former teams: Free agent Espoo Blues; JYP Jyväskylä; Kärpät; Djurgårdens IF; Brynäs IF; Hershey Bears; HV71; HPK; Tappara; Ässät; HIFK
- NHL draft: Undrafted
- Playing career: 2011–present

Juuso Ikonen (born 3 January 1995) is a Finnish professional ice hockey player who is currently a free agent. He last played for Tappara in the Liiga.

== Playing career ==
Undrafted, Ikonen in the 2012 regular season with Espoo Blues, he had four goals and five assists in 20 games. In the playoffs, he had four goals and two assists in 15 games. His goals included one overtime game-winner.

In the 2016–17 season, Ikonen joined Djurgårdens IF of the Swedish Hockey League (SHL) and was unable to find his footing, posting just 4 points in 25 games before transferring to Brynäs IF on 8 February 2017. On 15 May 2017, Ikonen, after an initial successful spell with Swedish club Brynäs IF, agreed to sign a one-year extension through 2018.

In the following 2017–18 season, Ikonen contributed with 12 goals and 26 points in 49 games to help Brynäs qualify for the playoffs. He added a further 3 goals and 5 points in 8 games during the postseason.

On 2 May 2018, Ikonen, as a free agent, agreed to terms on a two-year, two-way contract with the Washington Capitals of the National Hockey League (NH)L. After attending the Capitals' training camp, Ikonen was assigned to AHL affiliate, the Hershey Bears for the duration of the 2018–19 season. Ikonen struggled to produce offense with the Bears, totalling just 4 goals and 14 points in 54 games, failing to earn a recall to the NHL.

On 17 May 2019, Ikonen was placed on unconditional waivers by the Capitals and upon clearing was released from the remaining year of his contract to become a free agent. Ikonen opted to return and continue his professional career in Sweden, agreeing to a two-year contract with HV71 on 15 July 2019.

== International play ==
Ikonen was a regular participant in national junior teams. He was selected for the 2012 and 2013 IIHF World U18 Championships and the 2015 World Junior Ice Hockey Championship.

== Personal ==
His father, Juha Ikonen, is a former Blues captain and their all-time leading scorer. His brother, Joni Ikonen, was drafted by the Montreal Canadiens in 2017.

== Career statistics ==
=== Regular season and playoffs ===
			Regular season					Playoffs
Season	Team	League	GP	G	A	Pts	PIM	GP	G	A	Pts	PIM
2010–11	Blues	Jr. A	13	3	4	7	0	1	0	0	0	0
2011–12	Blues	Jr. A	32	20	21	41	14	—	—	—	—	—
2011–12	Blues	SM-l	20	4	5	9	4	15	4	2	6	2
2012–13	Blues	SM-l	57	13	13	26	4	—	—	—	—	—
2012–13	Blues	Jr. A	—	—	—	—	—	10	3	10	13	0
2013–14	Blues	Liiga	17	4	6	10	2	—	—	—	—	—
2013–14	JYP	Liiga	34	0	8	8	8	3	1	1	2	0
2014–15	JYP	Liiga	50	12	13	25	4	12	0	6	6	2
2015–16	Kärpät	Liiga	55	9	30	39	8	13	2	6	8	0
2016–17	Djurgårdens IF	SHL	25	2	2	4	0	—	—	—	—	—
2016–17	Brynäs IF	SHL	11	1	6	7	0	20	7	5	12	0
2017–18	Brynäs IF	SHL	49	12	14	26	6	8	3	2	5	2
2018–19	Hershey Bears	AHL	54	4	10	14	6	—	—	—	—	—
2019–20	HV71	SHL	52	7	10	17	6	—	—	—	—	—
2020–21	HPK	Liiga	57	13	24	37	18	—	—	—	—	—
2021–22	HPK	Liiga	55	7	8	15	6	2	0	0	0	0
2022–23	Tappara	Liiga	18	2	6	8	2	13	0	3	3	8
2023–24	Ässät	Liiga	49	6	13	19	6	—	—	—	—	—
Liiga totals			412	70	126	196	58	58	7	18	25	12
SHL totals			137	22	32	54	12	28	10	7	17	2

Medal record

Representing Finland

World Junior Championships
Gold medal – first place	2014 Sweden	

IIHF World U18 Championships
Bronze medal – third place	2013 Russia	

=== International ===
Year	Team	Event	Result	GP	G	A	Pts	PIM
2011	Finland	U17	7th	5	3	2	5	0
2011	Finland	IH18	4th	5	4	5	9	0
2012	Finland	U18	4th	5	0	1	1	0
2013	Finland	U18	3rd place, bronze medalist(s)	7	2	5	7	2
2014	Finland	WJC	1st place, gold medalist(s)	7	1	2	3	0
2015	Finland	WJC	7th	5	1	2	3	0
Junior totals				34	11	17	28	2
