= Simon Önerud =

Swedish professional ice hockey player (born 1988)

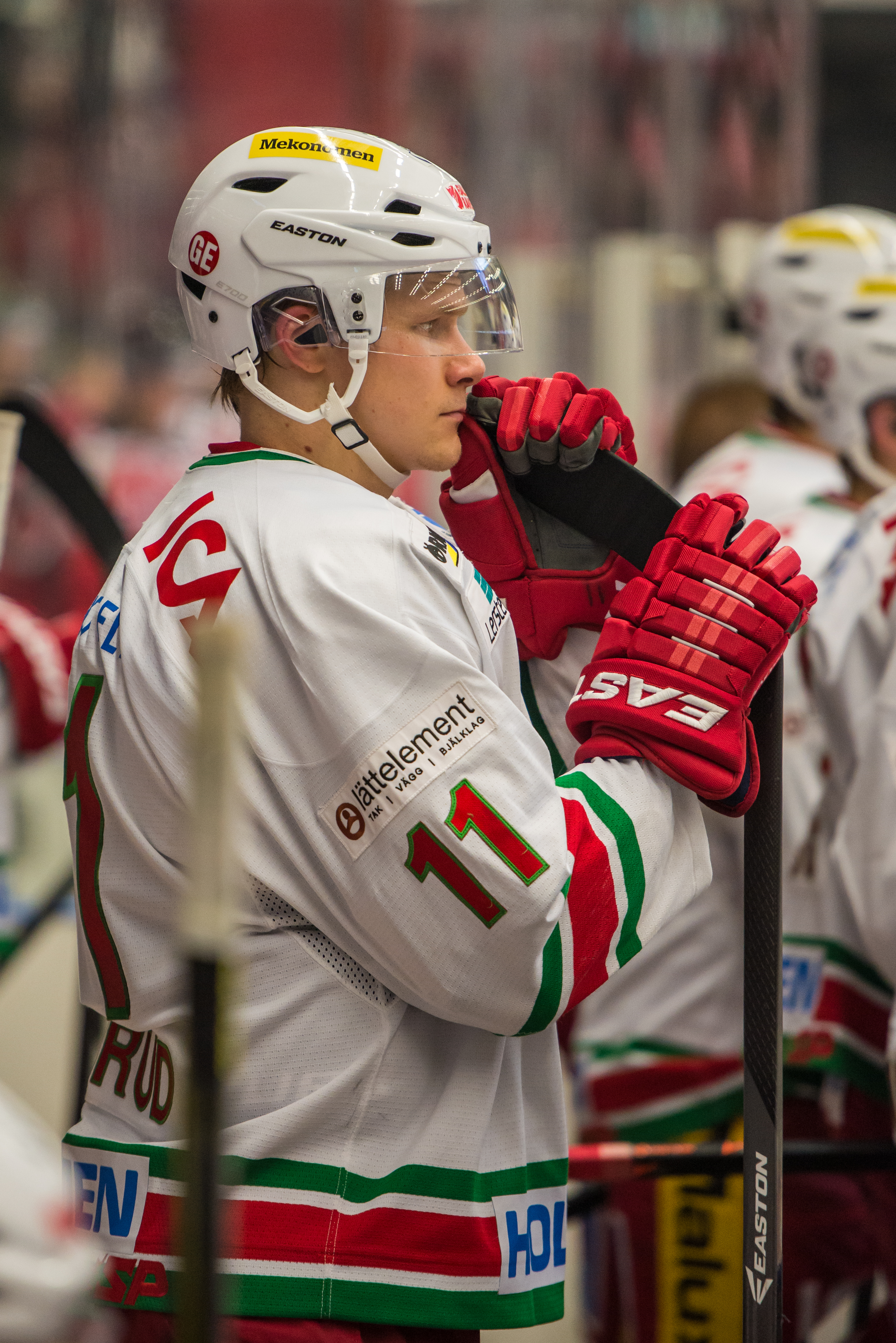
- Simon Önerud with Modo in October 2013
- Born: June 16, 1988 (age 36); Jönköping, Sweden
- Height: 6 ft 1 in (185 cm)
- Weight: 203 lb (92 kg; 14 st 7 lb)
- Position: Left wing
- Shoots: Left
- SHL team Former teams: HV71; Timrå IK; Modo Hockey; HC Sochi; Sibir Novosibirsk
- Playing career: 2007–present

Simon Önerud (born June 16, 1988) is a Swedish professional ice hockey player. He is currently playing with HV71 in the Swedish Hockey League (SHL). He has formerly played with Timrå IK and Modo Hockey in the SHL.

== Playing career ==
In the 2016–17 season, Önerud was amongst the team's leaders in offense. He contributed with 29 points in 37 games and 13 points in 16 post-season games to help lead HV71 to their 5th Le Mat Trophy. He was awarded with the Stefan Liv Memorial Trophy as the league's MVP in the post-season. A week after claiming the Championship, Önerud opted for a release from his contract with HV71 to become a free agent in order to pursue a new challenge in the KHL. On May 26, 2017, Önerud was announced to be the final foreign signing for HC Sochi on a one-year agreement.

After spending the 2017–18 season in the Kontinental Hockey League (KHL), split between HC Sochi and HC Sibir Novosibirsk, Önerud returned to the SHL, rejoining HV71, on a three-year contract on May 18, 2018.

== Awards and honors ==
| Award | Year |
|---|---|
SHL
| Le Mat Trophy (HV71) | 2010, 2017 |
| Stefan Liv Memorial Trophy | 2017 |
