= Felix Sandström =

Swedish ice hockey player

- Born: 12 January 1997 (age 29) Gävle, Sweden
- Height: 6 ft 2 in (188 cm)
- Weight: 211 lb (96 kg; 15 st 1 lb)
- Position: Goaltender
- Catches: Left
- Liiga team Former teams: Oulun Kärpät; Brynäs IF; HV71; Philadelphia Flyers
- NHL draft: 70th overall, 2015; Philadelphia Flyers
- Playing career: 2015–present

Per Felix Sandström (born 12 January 1997) is a Swedish professional ice hockey goaltender for Oulun Kärpät of the Finnish Liiga. He previously played parts of three seasons in the National Hockey League (NHL). Sandstrom was selected by the Philadelphia Flyers in the third round (70th overall) of the 2015 NHL entry draft.

== Playing career ==
Sandström made his Swedish Hockey League (SHL) debut playing with Brynäs IF during the 2014–15 season. Following the 2016–17 season, Sandström opted to continue his development with Brynäs IF, accepting a one-year contract extension on 10 May 2017.

In the 2017–18 season, Sandström was unable to cement a full-time role within Brynäs IF, and after appearing in only eight games with the club, was transferred to fellow SHL outfit HV71 on 12 February 2018.

Sandström signed a three-year, entry-level contract with the Philadelphia Flyers on 27 March 2018. He then joined AHL affiliate, the Lehigh Valley Phantoms on a professional try-out basis for their postseason on 31 March 2018. On 8 June 2021, Sandström signed a one-year, two-way contract extension with the Flyers. For the 2022–23 season, Sandström was promoted to become the Flyers backup goalie behind Carter Hart, making him a full-time NHL goalie for the first time in his career.

On 1 July 2024, Sandström signed a one-year, two-way contract with the Buffalo Sabres.

On 24 September 2025, Sandström signed with Oulun Kärpät of the Finnish Liiga.

== Personal life ==
Sandström's twin brother, Simon, also played with Brynäs IF at the J20 SuperElit level before leaving to play in the Hockeyettan with IF Sundsvall Hockey.

== Career statistics ==
=== Regular season and playoffs ===
			Regular season									Playoffs
Season	Team	League	GP	W	L	OT	MIN	GA	SO	GAA	SV%	GP	W	L	MIN	GA	SO	GAA	SV%
2013–14	Brynäs IF	J20	6	2	4	0	323	18	0	3.34	.870	—	—	—	—	—	—	—	—
2014–15	Brynäs IF	J20	14	10	4	0	821	36	0	2.63	.907	1	0	1	70	3	0	2.57	.889
2014–15	Brynäs IF	SHL	2	1	0	0	55	1	0	1.09	.963	1	0	0	20	1	0	3.00	.857
2015–16	Brynäs IF	J20	3	3	0	0	181	8	0	2.65	.910	2	0	2	119	10	0	5.05	.825
2015–16	Brynäs IF	SHL	25	10	14	0	1471	64	0	2.61	.904	2	1	1	117	7	0	3.60	.892
2016–17	Brynäs IF	SHL	22	14	7	0	1282	48	2	2.25	.908	13	6	4	594	28	2	2.83	.901
2016–17	Brynäs IF	J20	—	—	—	—	—	—	—	—	—	1	0	1	60	5	0	5.00	.853
2017–18	Brynäs IF	SHL	8	3	5	0	397	19	0	2.87	.904	—	—	—	—	—	—	—	—
2017–18	IK Oskarshamn	Allsv	7	3	4	0	387	20	0	3.10	.894	—	—	—	—	—	—	—	—
2017–18	HV71	SHL	3	2	1	0	186	8	0	2.58	.902	1	0	1	58	3	0	3.12	.885
2018–19	HV71	SHL	19	10	8	0	1112	40	0	2.16	.910	—	—	—	—	—	—	—	—
2018–19	Lehigh Valley Phantoms	AHL	1	1	0	0	60	3	0	3.02	.930	—	—	—	—	—	—	—	—
2019–20	Reading Royals	ECHL	25	13	11	1	1429	78	2	3.27	.885	—	—	—	—	—	—	—	—
2019–20	Lehigh Valley Phantoms	AHL	1	0	0	0	19	0	0	0.00	1.000	—	—	—	—	—	—	—	—
2020–21	Västerviks IK	Allsv	5	1	4	0	307	14	0	2.74	.920	—	—	—	—	—	—	—	—
2020–21	Lehigh Valley Phantoms	AHL	11	5	3	3	621	33	0	3.19	.903	—	—	—	—	—	—	—	—
2021–22	Lehigh Valley Phantoms	AHL	44	16	18	5	2391	115	2	2.89	.902	—	—	—	—	—	—	—	—
2021–22	Philadelphia Flyers	NHL	5	0	4	1	297	16	0	3.23	.910	—	—	—	—	—	—	—	—
2022–23	Philadelphia Flyers	NHL	20	3	12	3	1113	69	0	3.72	.880	—	—	—	—	—	—	—	—
2022–23	Lehigh Valley Phantoms	AHL	7	4	1	2	427	17	0	2.39	.911	—	—	—	—	—	—	—	—
2023–24	Lehigh Valley Phantoms	AHL	24	13	7	3	1411	74	0	3.15	.884	—	—	—	—	—	—	—	—
2023–24	Philadelphia Flyers	NHL	5	1	2	0	263	17	0	3.87	.823	—	—	—	—	—	—	—	—
2024–25	Rochester Americans	AHL	19	12	5	2	1092	52	0	2.86	.899	—	—	—	—	—	—	—	—
SHL totals			79	40	35	0	4,503	180	2	2.40	.907	17	7	6	789	39	2	2.97	.898
NHL totals			30	4	18	4	1,674	102	0	3.66	.880	—	—	—	—	—	—	—	—

=== International ===
Year	Team	Event	Result	GP	W	L	T	MIN	GA	SO	GAA	SV%
2013	Sweden	U17	1st place, gold medalist(s)	2	2	0	0	120	7	0	3.50	.885
2014	Sweden	U17	6th	4	2	2	0	244	12	0	2.95	.928
2014	Sweden	IH18	4th	3	—	—	—	—	—	—	3.35	.894
2015	Sweden	U18	8th	4	1	3	0	236	13	0	3.31	.909
2016	Sweden	WJC	4th	3	1	1	0	124	8	1	3.88	.795
2017	Sweden	WJC	4th	6	4	2	0	360	13	0	2.17	.915
Junior totals				22	10	8	0	1,084	53	1	—	—
