= Simon Bertilsson =

Swedish ice hockey player (born 1991)

- Born: April 19, 1991 (age 35) Karlskoga, Sweden
- Height: 6 ft 0 in (183 cm)
- Weight: 207 lb (94 kg; 14 st 11 lb)
- Position: Defence
- Shoots: Left
- SHL team Former teams: Brynäs IF; HC Sochi
- National team: Sweden
- NHL draft: 87th overall, 2009; Philadelphia Flyers
- Playing career: 2008–present

Simon Bertilsson (born April 19, 1991, in Karlskoga) is a Swedish professional ice hockey player who is currently playing with Brynäs IF of the Swedish Hockey League (SHL). He was drafted by the Philadelphia Flyers in the third-round, 87th overall, of the 2009 NHL entry draft.

== Playing career ==
Bertilsson after one junior season at the under 18 level with Bofors IK, moved to Brynäs IF in 2007. He advanced up the ranks with Brynäs, making his professional debut in 2008 in the then Elitserien. Bertilsson played the first 11 years of his professional career in the Swedish Hockey League (SHL) with Brynäs before leaving as a free agent following the 2018–19 season.

In his first venture abroad, Bertilsson signed a one-year contract with Russian club, HC Sochi of the Kontinental Hockey League, on May 1, 2019. In his only season in the KHL in 2019–20, Bertilsson adapted to the Russian style, collecting 2 goals and 12 points in 52 regular season games as Sochi was unable to qualify for the post-season.

On 15 July 2020, Bertilsson opted to return to his original club after just one season away, agreeing to a four-year contract with Brynäs IF to resume his SHL career.

== Career statistics ==
=== Regular season and playoffs ===
| | | | Regular season | | | | | Playoffs |
| Season | Team | League | GP | G | A | Pts | PIM | GP | G | A | Pts | PIM |
|---|---|---|---|---|---|---|---|---|---|---|---|---|
| 2007–08 | Brynäs IF | J18 Allsv | 4 | 1 | 1 | 2 | 27 | 5 | 0 | 0 | 0 | 4 |
| 2007–08 | Brynäs IF | J20 | 27 | 2 | 3 | 5 | 52 | 7 | 0 | 0 | 0 | 8 |
| 2008–09 | Brynäs IF | J18 | 2 | 1 | 2 | 3 | 2 | — | — | — | — | — |
| 2008–09 | Brynäs IF | J18 Allsv | 3 | 1 | 1 | 2 | 48 | 1 | 2 | 0 | 2 | 4 |
| 2008–09 | Brynäs IF | J20 | 30 | 9 | 22 | 31 | 54 | 6 | 0 | 1 | 1 | 0 |
| 2008–09 | Brynäs IF | SEL | 21 | 0 | 1 | 1 | 2 | 4 | 0 | 0 | 0 | 0 |
| 2009–10 | Brynäs IF | SEL | 32 | 1 | 3 | 4 | 43 | 5 | 0 | 0 | 0 | 2 |
| 2009–10 | Brynäs IF | J20 | — | — | — | — | — | 2 | 0 | 0 | 0 | 0 |
| 2010–11 | Brynäs IF | J20 | 4 | 0 | 3 | 3 | 2 | — | — | — | — | — |
| 2010–11 | Brynäs IF | SEL | 36 | 0 | 2 | 2 | 20 | 4 | 0 | 0 | 0 | 2 |
| 2011–12 | Brynäs IF | SEL | 43 | 0 | 5 | 5 | 68 | 12 | 0 | 4 | 4 | 8 |
| 2012–13 | Brynäs IF | SEL | 22 | 1 | 3 | 4 | 28 | — | — | — | — | — |
| 2013–14 | Brynäs IF | SHL | 38 | 1 | 12 | 13 | 34 | 5 | 0 | 0 | 0 | 0 |
| 2014–15 | Brynäs IF | SHL | 43 | 1 | 4 | 5 | 51 | — | — | — | — | — |
| 2015–16 | Brynäs IF | SHL | 5 | 0 | 0 | 0 | 4 | — | — | — | — | — |
| 2016–17 | Brynäs IF | SHL | 37 | 2 | 4 | 6 | 8 | 11 | 3 | 2 | 5 | 16 |
| 2017–18 | Brynäs IF | SHL | 39 | 3 | 5 | 8 | 12 | 8 | 1 | 0 | 1 | 4 |
| 2018–19 | Brynäs IF | SHL | 52 | 3 | 15 | 18 | 28 | — | — | — | — | — |
| 2019–20 | HC Sochi | KHL | 52 | 2 | 10 | 12 | 16 | — | — | — | — | — |
| 2020–21 | Brynäs IF | SHL | 35 | 2 | 17 | 19 | 20 | — | — | — | — | — |
| 2021–22 | Brynäs IF | SHL | 49 | 2 | 9 | 11 | 38 | 3 | 1 | 2 | 3 | 4 |
| 2022–23 | Brynäs IF | SHL | 41 | 3 | 5 | 8 | 43 | — | — | — | — | — |
| 2023–24 | Brynäs IF | Allsv | 45 | 5 | 11 | 16 | 18 | 12 | 1 | 2 | 3 | 4 |
| 2024–25 | Brynäs IF | SHL | 49 | 4 | 6 | 10 | 32 | 5 | 0 | 0 | 0 | 6 |
| SHL totals | | | 542 | 23 | 91 | 114 | 431 | 57 | 5 | 8 | 13 | 42 |

=== International ===
| Year | Team | Event | Result | GP | G | A | Pts | PIM |
|---|---|---|---|---|---|---|---|---|
| 2009 | Sweden | WJC18 | 5th | 6 | 0 | 1 | 1 | 6 |
| 2011 | Sweden | WJC | 4th | 6 | 0 | 1 | 1 | 4 |
| 2018 | Sweden | OG | 5th | 4 | 0 | 1 | 1 | 0 |
| Junior totals | | | | 12 | 0 | 2 | 2 | 10 |
| Senior totals | | | | 4 | 0 | 1 | 1 | 0 |

== Awards and honors ==
| Award | Year |
|---|---|
SHL
| Le Mat trophy (Brynäs IF) | 2012 |
