= Lias Andersson =

Swedish ice hockey player (born 1998)

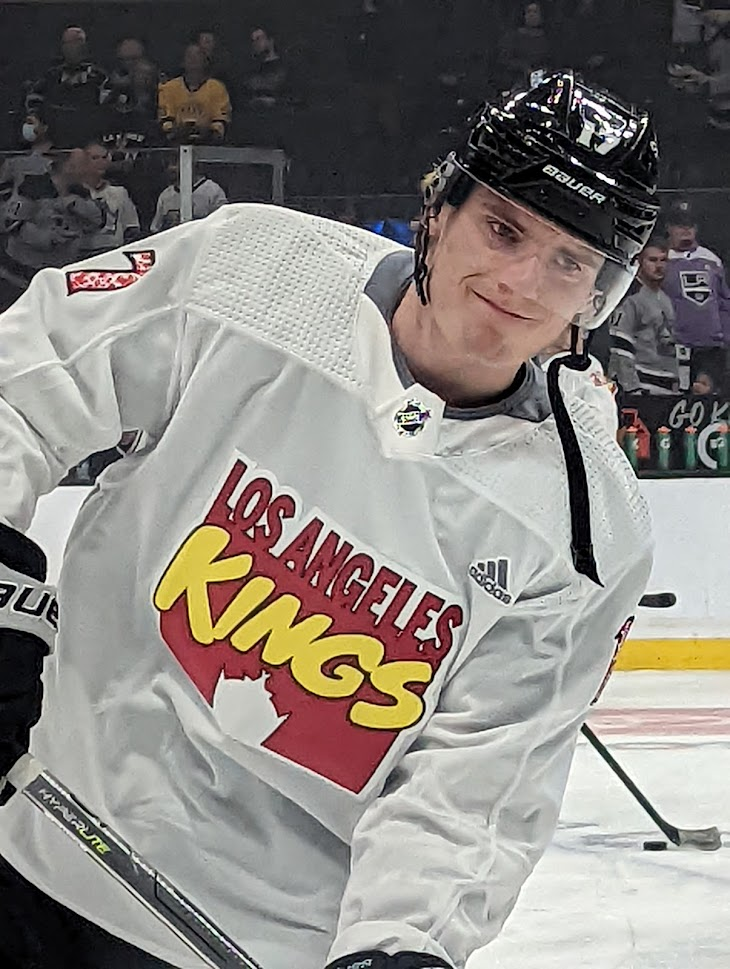
- Andersson with the Los Angeles Kings in 2022
- Born: 13 October 1998 (age 27) Smögen, Sweden
- Height: 6 ft 0 in (183 cm)
- Weight: 185 lb (84 kg; 13 st 3 lb)
- Position: Centre
- Shoots: Left
- NL team Former teams: EHC Biel-Bienne; HV71; Frölunda HC; New York Rangers; Los Angeles Kings
- National team: Sweden
- NHL draft: 7th overall, 2017; New York Rangers
- Playing career: 2015–present

Lias Andersson (born 13 October 1998) is a Swedish professional ice hockey forward for EHC Biel-Bienne of the National League (NL). He was selected in the first round, seventh overall, by the New York Rangers of the National Hockey League (NHL) in the 2017 NHL entry draft. Andersson has also previously played for the Los Angeles Kings.

== Playing career ==
Andersson made his Swedish Hockey League (SHL) debut with HV71 during the 2015–16 season. In the following 2016–17 season, able to accept a larger role, Andersson appeared in 42 games in the regular season, contributing with 9 goals and 19 points. He appeared in every postseason game in compiling 4 goals and 5 point in 16 games to help HV71 capture their fifth Le Mat Trophy.

On 8 May 2017, Andersson opted to leave HV71 and agreed to a two-year contract to link up with Frölunda HC. It marked a return in continuing his heritage, as he spent his childhood with the club, as his father gained an icon status during his tenure with Frölunda. He was selected by the New York Rangers of the National Hockey League (NHL), seventh overall, in the 2017 NHL entry draft. Following his selection by the Rangers, Andersson signed to a three-year, entry-level contract in July 2017.

In the 2017–18 season, Andersson made his debut with Frölunda HC and appeared in 22 games, registering 7 goals and 14 points, before leaving the club to attend his second World Junior Championships. Following the conclusion of the tournament, Andersson left the SHL and was re-assigned by the Rangers to make his North American debut in joining their American Hockey League (AHL) affiliate, the Hartford Wolf Pack on 19 January 2018. On 25 March, Andersson was called up by the Rangers and made his NHL debut against the Washington Capitals at Madison Square Garden the next day. He scored his first career NHL goal in his debut, making him the youngest Rangers player to score a goal in their debut, surpassing Mike Allison. Andersson was subsequently sent back to the AHL thereafter.

Andersson began the 2018–19 season in the AHL after being cut from the Rangers 2018 training camp. After recording 12 points in 14 games for the Hartford Wolf Pack, Andersson was recalled to the NHL on 5 November 2018. On 21 December 2019, it was reported by Darren Dreger that Andersson had formally asked the New York Rangers for a trade. However, on 26 January 2020, the Rangers opted to loan Andersson to HV71 of the SHL. Andersson's tenure with the Rangers officially ended in October 2020 as he was dealt to the Los Angeles Kings in exchange for Vegas' second-round pick in 2020.

Andersson finished the season with HV71, playing 15 games and began the 2020–21 season with HV71, playing 19 games before coming to Los Angeles for NHL training camp. He split the NHL season between Los Angeles and their AHL affiliate, the Ontario Reign. Andersson scored his first goal for the Kings on 24 January 2021, against Ville Husso in a 6–3 win over the St. Louis Blues. On 30 July, Andersson re-signed with Los Angeles to a one-year, two-way contract. In the 2021–22 season, Andersson appeared in 20 games for the Kings, scoring one goal and two points. He signed a one-year extension with Los Angeles on 11 July 2022. The 2022–23 season saw Andersson spend the majority of the year with the Reign, appearing only once for Los Angeles.

On 2 July 2023, Andersson as a free agent signed a one-year, two-way contract with the Montreal Canadiens. Andersson attended the Canadiens 2023 training camp but was placed on waivers with the intent on assigning him to Montreal's AHL affiliate, the Laval Rocket. After going unclaimed, Andersson was assigned to Laval to start the 2023–24 season.

In June 2024, Andersson left the Canadiens organization and signed a two-year contract with EHC Biel-Bienne of the Switzerland-based National League (NL).

== International play ==
Medal record

Representing Sweden

Men's ice hockey

World Championships
Gold medal – first place	2018 Denmark	

World Junior Championship
Silver medal – second place	2018 United States	

Andersson was named to Team Sweden for the 2016 IIHF World U18 Championships and helped Sweden win silver by putting up nine points in seven games. He was again named to Team Sweden for the 2017 World Junior Ice Hockey Championships, where he scored three goals. He was named captain to Team Sweden for the 2018 World Junior Ice Hockey Championships, where he helped guide the team to a silver medal, and in a controversial display, threw it into the crowd in frustration. For this action, he was suspended from four games during the 2019 World Junior Ice Hockey Championships.

In April 2018, he was named to Sweden's 2018 IIHF World Championship team, and Sweden won gold.

== Personal life ==
Andersson's father Niklas played in 165 NHL games, while his uncle Mikael played in 761 NHL games.

== Career statistics ==
=== Regular season and playoffs ===
			Regular season					Playoffs
Season	Team	League	GP	G	A	Pts	PIM	GP	G	A	Pts	PIM
2012–13	Kungälvs IK	J18	23	4	1	5	2	—	—	—	—	—
2013–14	Kungälvs IK	J18	32	18	19	37	76	—	—	—	—	—
2013–14	Kungälvs IK	J20 II	1	0	0	0	0	2	0	0	0	0
2014–15	HV71	J18	11	6	9	15	20	—	—	—	—	—
2014–15	HV71	J18 Allsv	2	0	4	4	0	4	2	2	4	2
2014–15	HV71	J20	25	6	3	9	16	6	0	2	2	0
2015–16	HV71	J18	1	1	1	2	0	—	—	—	—	—
2015–16	HV71	J18 Allsv	1	0	4	4	0	—	—	—	—	—
2015–16	HV71	J20	37	24	35	59	91	1	2	0	2	2
2015–16	HV71	SHL	22	0	0	0	6	4	0	0	0	0
2016–17	HV71	J20	3	2	0	2	2	—	—	—	—	—
2016–17	HV71	SHL	42	9	10	19	18	16	4	1	5	18
2017–18	Frölunda HC	SHL	22	7	7	14	20	—	—	—	—	—
2017–18	Hartford Wolf Pack	AHL	25	5	9	14	8	—	—	—	—	—
2017–18	New York Rangers	NHL	7	1	1	2	0	—	—	—	—	—
2018–19	Hartford Wolf Pack	AHL	36	6	14	20	25	—	—	—	—	—
2018–19	New York Rangers	NHL	42	2	4	6	29	—	—	—	—	—
2019–20	New York Rangers	NHL	17	0	1	1	4	—	—	—	—	—
2019–20	Hartford Wolf Pack	AHL	13	4	1	5	14	—	—	—	—	—
2019–20	HV71	SHL	15	7	5	12	6	—	—	—	—	—
2020–21	HV71	SHL	19	5	6	11	4	—	—	—	—	—
2020–21	Los Angeles Kings	NHL	23	3	3	6	12	—	—	—	—	—
2020–21	Ontario Reign	AHL	15	6	11	17	0	1	1	0	1	0
2021–22	Los Angeles Kings	NHL	20	1	1	2	12	—	—	—	—	—
2021–22	Ontario Reign	AHL	4	6	0	6	2	—	—	—	—	—
2022–23	Ontario Reign	AHL	67	31	28	59	38	2	2	1	3	2
2022–23	Los Angeles Kings	NHL	1	0	0	0	0	—	—	—	—	—
2023–24	Laval Rocket	AHL	53	21	24	45	33	—	—	—	—	—
2024–25	EHC Biel-Bienne	NL	40	15	18	33	24	—	—	—	—	—
SHL totals			120	28	28	56	54	20	4	1	5	18
NHL totals			110	7	10	17	57	—	—	—	—	—
NL totals			40	15	18	33	24	—	—	—	—	—

=== International ===
Year	Team	Event	Result	GP	G	A	Pts	PIM
2014	Sweden	U17	3rd place, bronze medalist(s)	6	1	3	4	2
2015	Sweden	IH18	2nd place, silver medalist(s)	5	0	0	0	18
2016	Sweden	WJC18	2nd place, silver medalist(s)	7	5	4	9	8
2017	Sweden	WJC	4th	7	3	0	3	6
2018	Sweden	WJC	2nd place, silver medalist(s)	7	6	1	7	6
2018	Sweden	WC	1st place, gold medalist(s)	10	1	1	2	4
Junior totals				32	15	8	23	40
Senior totals				10	1	1	2	4

== Awards and honors ==
Award	Year	Ref
SHL
Le Mat Trophy champion	2017	

Awards and achievements
Preceded by Brady Skjei	New York Rangers first-round draft pick 2017	Succeeded by Filip Chytil
