= Linus Söderström =

Swedish ice hockey player

- Born: 23 August 1996 (age 29) Stockholm, Sweden
- Height: 193 cm (6 ft 4 in)
- Weight: 90 kg (198 lb; 14 st 2 lb)
- Position: Goaltender
- Catches: Left
- SHL team Former teams: Skellefteå AIK; HV71; Ässät
- NHL draft: 95th overall, 2014; New York Islanders
- Playing career: 2014–present

Linus Söderström (born 23 August 1996) is a Swedish professional ice hockey goaltender. He is currently under contract with Skellefteå AIK of the Swedish Hockey League (SHL).

== Playing career ==
Söderström was contracted by Djurgårdens IF in his native Sweden, playing at the J20 SuperElit level when he was selected by the New York Islanders in the 4th round (95th overall) of the 2014 NHL entry draft.

After loan assignments in the HockeyAllsvenskan with Södertälje SK, Almtuna IS and HC Vita Hästen, Söderström left Djurgårdens IF without a senior appearance, agreeing to a one-year deal with HV71 on April 11, 2016. Söderström made his SHL debut on October 1, 2016, making 30 saves on 31 shots in a game against Skellefteå AIK.

On May 11, 2017, Söderström was signed to a three-year, entry-level contract with the New York Islanders. He was returned on loan by the Islanders to continue his development and tenure with HV71 through the first year of his entry-level deal in the 2017–18 season.

Söderström moved to North America for the remaining two years of his entry-level contract, however his development was stalled through injury, limited to just 4 games with ECHL affiliate, the Worcester Railers, in the 2019–20 season.

As an impending restricted free agent from the Islanders, while still harbouring NHL aspirations Söderström returned to Europe to relaunch his career, agreeing to a one-year contract with Finnish outfit, Ässät of the Liiga, on 31 July 2020.

== Personal life ==
Söderström was diagnosed with autistic spectrum disorder and attention deficit hyperactivity disorder at the age of 7.

== Awards and honors ==
Award	Year
SHL
Best GAA (1.34)	2017
Le Mat Trophy	2017, 2024
