= Kristofer Berglund =

Swedish professional ice hockey player

- Born: August 12, 1988 (age 38) Umeå, Sweden
- Height: 5 ft 10 in (178 cm)
- Weight: 181 lb (82 kg; 12 st 13 lb)
- Position: Defence
- Shot: Left
- Played for: IF Björklöven; Tegs SK Hockey; Luleå HF; Färjestad BK; Växjö Lakers; HV71; Dinamo Riga; Brynäs IF
- NHL draft: 125th overall, 2008; St. Louis Blues
- Playing career: 2008–2022

Kristofer Berglund (born August 12, 1988) is a Swedish professional ice hockey player currently an unrestricted free agent. He most recently played for Brynäs IF in the Swedish Hockey League (SHL). He was drafted by the St. Louis Blues in the fifth round of the 2008 NHL entry draft, 125th overall.

== Playing career ==
Berglund joined Dinamo Riga of the Kontinental Hockey League (KHL) on a two-year contract on May 29, 2019, after two seasons with HV71. Following just one season with the Latvian based club, Berglund sought a release and returned to Sweden in securing a two-year deal with Brynäs IF of the SHL on 23 March 2020.

== Career statistics ==
| | | | Regular season | | | | | Playoffs |
| Season | Team | League | GP | G | A | Pts | PIM | GP | G | A | Pts | PIM |
|---|---|---|---|---|---|---|---|---|---|---|---|---|
| 2003–04 | IF Björklöven U16 | U16 SM | 3 | 0 | 0 | 0 | 4 | — | — | — | — | — |
| 2003–04 | IF Björklöven J18 | J18 Allsvenskan | 10 | 4 | 4 | 8 | 2 | — | — | — | — | — |
| 2004–05 | IF Björklöven J18 | J18 Elit | — | — | — | — | — | — | — | — | — | — |
| 2004–05 | IF Björklöven J20 | J20 SuperElit | — | — | — | — | — | — | — | — | — | — |
| 2005–06 | IF Björklöven J20 | J20 SuperElit | 38 | 3 | 11 | 14 | 36 | 6 | 0 | 3 | 3 | 8 |
| 2005–06 | IF Björklöven | HockeyAllsvenskan | 1 | 0 | 0 | 0 | 0 | — | — | — | — | — |
| 2006–07 | IF Björklöven J20 | J20 SuperElit | 30 | 4 | 22 | 26 | 38 | — | — | — | — | — |
| 2006–07 | IF Björklöven | HockeyAllsvenskan | 27 | 0 | 1 | 1 | 6 | 10 | 0 | 3 | 3 | 10 |
| 2006–07 | Tegs SK Hockey | Division 1 | 2 | 0 | 1 | 1 | 2 | — | — | — | — | — |
| 2007–08 | IF Björklöven J20 | J20 SuperElit | 1 | 0 | 0 | 0 | 0 | — | — | — | — | — |
| 2007–08 | IF Björklöven | HockeyAllsvenskan | 42 | 4 | 21 | 25 | 14 | 2 | 0 | 1 | 1 | 0 |
| 2008–09 | Luleå HF | Elitserien | 52 | 3 | 22 | 25 | 36 | 5 | 0 | 3 | 3 | 4 |
| 2009–10 | Luleå HF | Elitserien | 55 | 6 | 16 | 22 | 22 | — | — | — | — | — |
| 2010–11 | Färjestad BK | Elitserien | 51 | 3 | 12 | 15 | 28 | 13 | 1 | 3 | 4 | 10 |
| 2011–12 | Färjestad BK | Elitserien | 51 | 0 | 10 | 10 | 44 | 11 | 1 | 4 | 5 | 8 |
| 2012–13 | Växjö Lakers HC | Elitserien | 54 | 3 | 7 | 10 | 14 | — | — | — | — | — |
| 2013–14 | Växjö Lakers HC | SHL | 43 | 1 | 6 | 7 | 40 | 12 | 0 | 2 | 2 | 2 |
| 2014–15 | HV71 | SHL | 53 | 0 | 7 | 7 | 18 | 6 | 0 | 1 | 1 | 6 |
| 2015–16 | HV71 | SHL | 40 | 1 | 12 | 13 | 10 | 6 | 0 | 2 | 2 | 0 |
| 2016–17 | HV71 | SHL | 51 | 3 | 10 | 13 | 20 | 16 | 1 | 4 | 5 | 6 |
| 2017–18 | HV71 | SHL | 11 | 0 | 1 | 1 | 20 | — | — | — | — | — |
| 2018–19 | HV71 | SHL | 49 | 2 | 10 | 12 | 47 | 9 | 0 | 3 | 3 | 6 |
| 2019–20 | Dinamo Riga | KHL | 49 | 0 | 5 | 5 | 38 | — | — | — | — | — |
| 2020–21 | Brynäs IF | SHL | 51 | 1 | 6 | 7 | 34 | — | — | — | — | — |
| 2021–22 | Brynäs IF | SHL | 48 | 0 | 0 | 0 | 8 | 3 | 0 | 0 | 0 | 2 |
| SHL (Elitserien) totals | | | 609 | 23 | 119 | 142 | 341 | 81 | 3 | 22 | 25 | 44 |

== Awards and honors ==
| Award | Year |
|---|---|
SHL
| Le Mat trophy (Färjestad BK) | 2011 |
| Le Mat trophy (HV71) | 2017 |
