= Jacob Blomqvist =

Swedish professional ice hockey centre

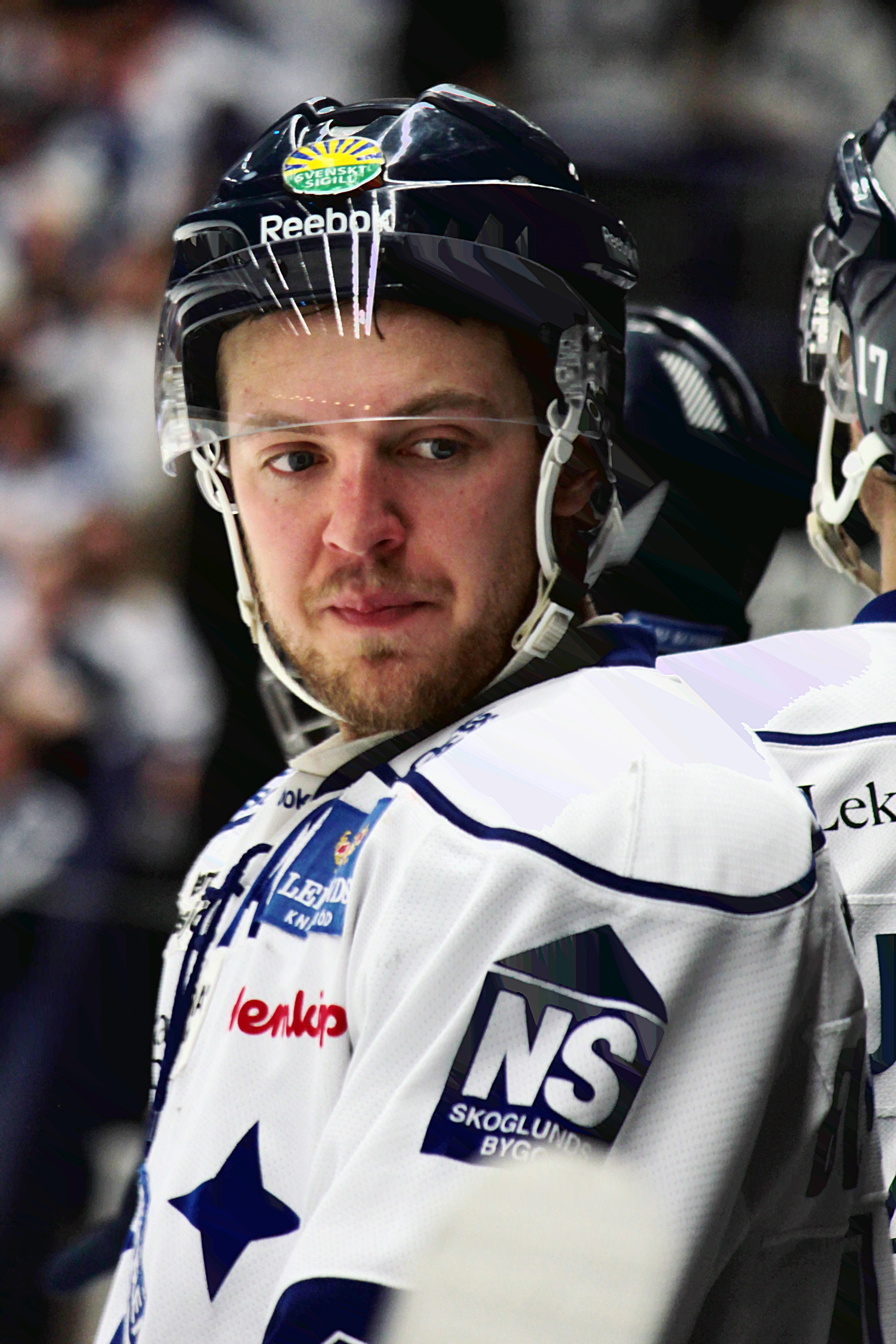
- Born: November 8, 1986 (age 39) Hedesunda, Sweden
- Height: 6 ft 0 in (183 cm)
- Weight: 176 lb (80 kg; 12 st 8 lb)
- Position: Centre
- Shot: Right
- Played for: Brynäs IF; Team Kiruna IF; IFK Kumla; Valbo HC; Bofors IK; Modo Hockey; Leksands IF; Timrå IK
- Playing career: 2005–2024

Jacob Blomqvist (born November 8, 1986) is a Swedish professional ice hockey centre who currently plays for Brynäs IF of the Swedish Hockey League (SHL).

He has formerly played with Modo Hockey, Leksands IF and Timrå IK in the SHL. During the 2016–17 season, on November 22, 2016, Blomqvist agreed to a three-year contract extension to remain with Brynäs IF through 2020.

== Career statistics ==
			Regular season					Playoffs
Season	Team	League	GP	G	A	Pts	PIM	GP	G	A	Pts	PIM
2001–02	Brynäs IF U16	U16 SM	5	3	0	3	6	—	—	—	—	—
2001–02	Brynäs IF J18	J18 Allsvenskan	4	0	0	0	4	—	—	—	—	—
2002–03	Brynäs IF J18	J18 Elit	—	—	—	—	—	—	—	—	—	—
2003–04	Brynäs IF J18	J18 Allsvenskan	10	5	3	8	41	5	2	2	4	6
2003–04	Brynäs IF J20	J20 SuperElit	31	2	4	6	26	3	0	0	0	0
2004–05	Brynäs IF J20	J20 SuperElit	34	3	7	10	67	—	—	—	—	—
2005–06	Brynäs IF J20	J20 SuperElit	39	13	15	28	44	2	0	1	1	2
2005–06	Brynäs IF	Elitserien	8	0	0	0	0	—	—	—	—	—
2006–07	Team Kiruna IF	Division 1	29	11	13	24	51	—	—	—	—	—
2007–08	IFK Kumla	Division 1	30	15	16	31	32	—	—	—	—	—
2007–08	Valbo HC	Division 1	10	3	5	8	8	—	—	—	—	—
2008–09	Valbo HC	Division 1	41	30	38	68	81	10	3	5	8	16
2009–10	Bofors IK	HockeyAllsvenskan	52	24	32	56	30	2	0	1	1	2
2010–11	MODO Hockey J20	J20 SuperElit	1	1	1	2	2	—	—	—	—	—
2010–11	MODO Hockey	Elitserien	49	2	3	5	12	—	—	—	—	—
2011–12	Leksands IF	HockeyAllsvenskan	52	12	19	31	22	10	0	2	2	10
2012–13	Leksands IF	HockeyAllsvenskan	51	14	16	30	34	10	6	5	11	4
2013–14	Leksands IF	SHL	55	14	12	26	22	3	1	1	2	2
2014–15	Brynäs IF	SHL	55	4	16	20	16	7	0	1	1	0
2015–16	Brynäs IF	SHL	52	4	10	14	24	3	2	2	4	2
2016–17	Brynäs IF	SHL	51	11	9	20	59	20	6	3	9	10
2017–18	Brynäs IF	SHL	52	12	13	25	16	8	3	3	6	2
2018–19	Brynäs IF	SHL	49	4	9	13	45	—	—	—	—	—
2019–20	Brynäs IF	SHL	51	8	3	11	28	—	—	—	—	—
2020–21	Timrå IK	HockeyAllsvenskan	52	16	14	30	37	15	2	4	6	8
2021–22	Timrå IK	SHL	48	10	12	22	18	—	—	—	—	—
2022–23	Timrå IK	SHL	26	2	2	4	10	—	—	—	—	—
2022–23	Brynäs IF	SHL	25	6	5	11	2	—	—	—	—	—
2023–24	Brynäs IF	HockeyAllsvenskan	50	9	5	14	8	13	0	0	0	4
SHL (Elitserien) totals			521	77	94	171	252	41	12	10	23	16
HockeyAllsvenskan totals			257	75	86	161	131	50	8	12	20	28
Division 1 totals			110	59	72	131	172	10	3	5	8	16
