= Oscar Sundh =

Swedish professional ice hockey player (born 1986)

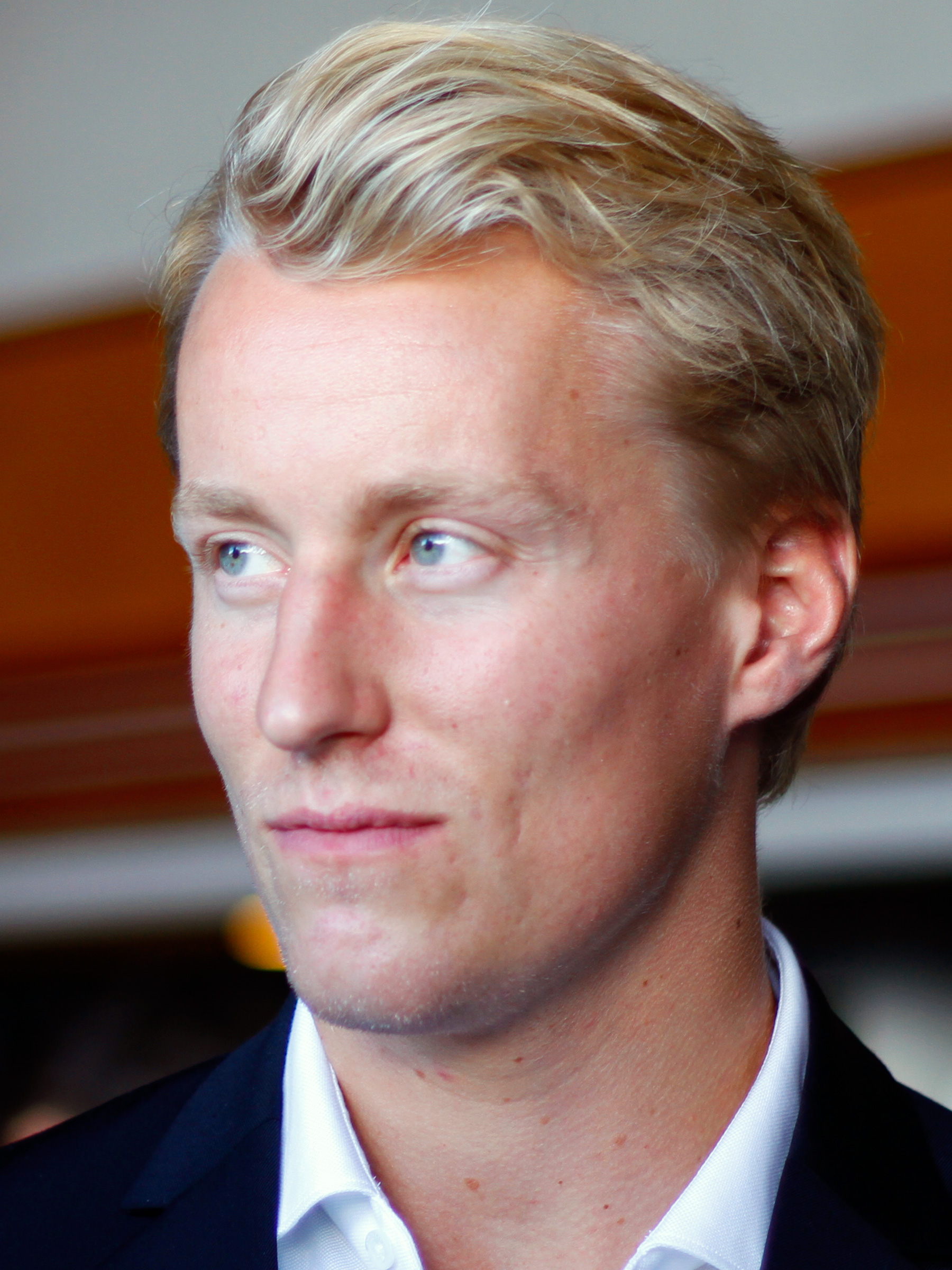
- Oscar Sundh in September 2012
- Born: October 22, 1986 (age 38); Uppsala, Sweden
- Height: 6 ft 2 in (188 cm)
- Weight: 196 lb (89 kg; 14 st 0 lb)
- Position: Right wing
- Shot: Left
- Played for: Djurgårdens IF; Timrå IK; HV71; Luleå HF; Linköpings HC; IK Oskarshamn
- NHL draft: Undrafted
- Playing career: 2003–2021

Oscar Sundh (born October 22, 1986, in Uppsala, Sweden) is a Swedish former professional ice hockey forward, who played in the Swedish Hockey League (SHL).

== Playing career ==
In 2006, Sundh signed with Timrå IK for one year. However, in September the same year, during the 2006–07 preseason, his contract was extended to 2007–08. The following month, he was named the first in the line of four candidates for Elitserien Rookie of the Year 2007. The award was eventually won by the forward Patric Hörnqvist.

After three seasons with Timrå IK, Sundh signed a two-year deal with HV71.

== Career statistics ==
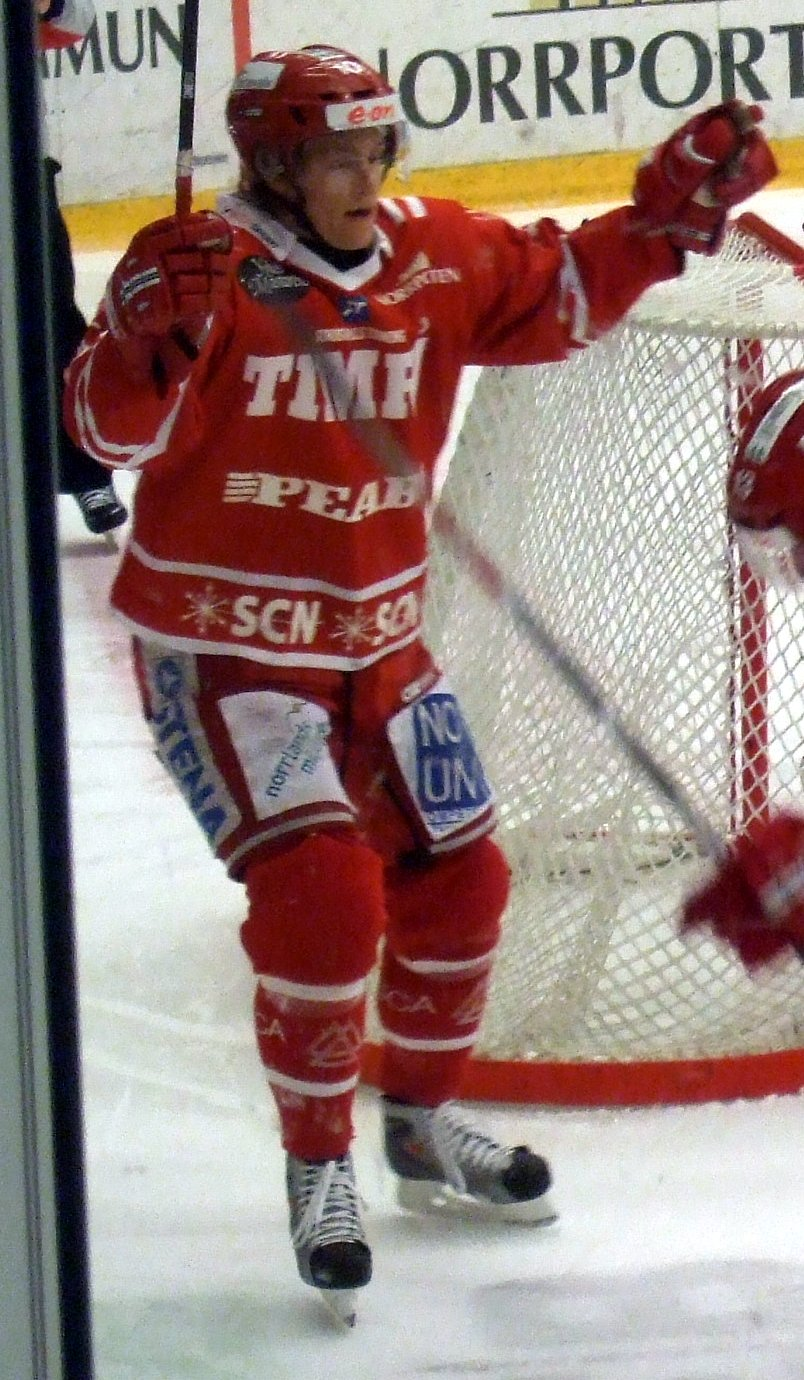
Sundh with Timrå IK .

=== Regular season and playoffs ===
			Regular season					Playoffs
Season	Team	League	GP	G	A	Pts	PIM	GP	G	A	Pts	PIM
2003–04	Almtuna IS	Allsv	29	6	3	9	8	—	—	—	—	—
2003–04	Djurgårdens IF	SEL	3	0	0	0	0	—	—	—	—	—
2004–05	Almtuna IS	Allsv	43	3	7	10	45	—	—	—	—	—
2004–05	Djurgårdens IF	SEL	2	1	0	1	0	—	—	—	—	—
2005–06	St. John's Fog Devils	QMJHL	54	17	46	63	50	5	1	0	1	2
2006–07	Timrå IK	SEL	52	6	12	18	80	7	1	2	3	2
2007–08	Timrå IK	SEL	55	8	7	15	28	11	2	3	5	4
2008–09	Timrå IK	SEL	52	4	5	9	46	7	1	0	1	4
2009–10	HV71	SEL	53	5	16	21	26	16	3	2	5	0
2010–11	HV71	SEL	53	8	12	20	22	4	0	0	0	2
2011–12	HV71	SEL	53	15	14	29	88	4	0	0	0	0
2012–13	HV71	SEL	33	5	7	12	10	5	0	1	1	0
2013–14	Luleå HF	SHL	10	2	2	4	2	—	—	—	—	—
2013–14	Linköpings HC	SHL	34	5	8	13	6	14	2	1	3	0
2014–15	Linköpings HC	SHL	53	3	5	8	10	11	1	1	2	4
2015–16	HV71	SHL	52	15	5	20	18	6	1	2	3	2
2016–17	HV71	SHL	52	9	9	18	16	16	4	7	11	16
2017–18	HV71	SHL	50	6	10	16	14	2	0	0	0	2
2018–19	HV71	SHL	52	7	15	22	12	6	0	0	0	6
2019–20	HV71	SHL	52	6	5	11	16	—	—	—	—	—
2020–21	IK Oskarshamn	SHL	13	5	1	6	4	—	—	—	—	—
SHL totals			724	110	133	243	398	109	15	19	34	42

=== International ===
Year	Team	Event	Result	GP	G	A	Pts	PIM
2004	Sweden	U18	5th	6	0	2	2	0
2006	Sweden	WJC	5th	4	0	0	0	2
Junior totals				10	0	2	2	2

== Awards and honors ==
Award	Year
SHL
Rookie of the Year nominee	2007
Le Mat trophy (HV71)	2010, 2017
