= Linus Ölund =

Swedish ice hockey player (1997-)

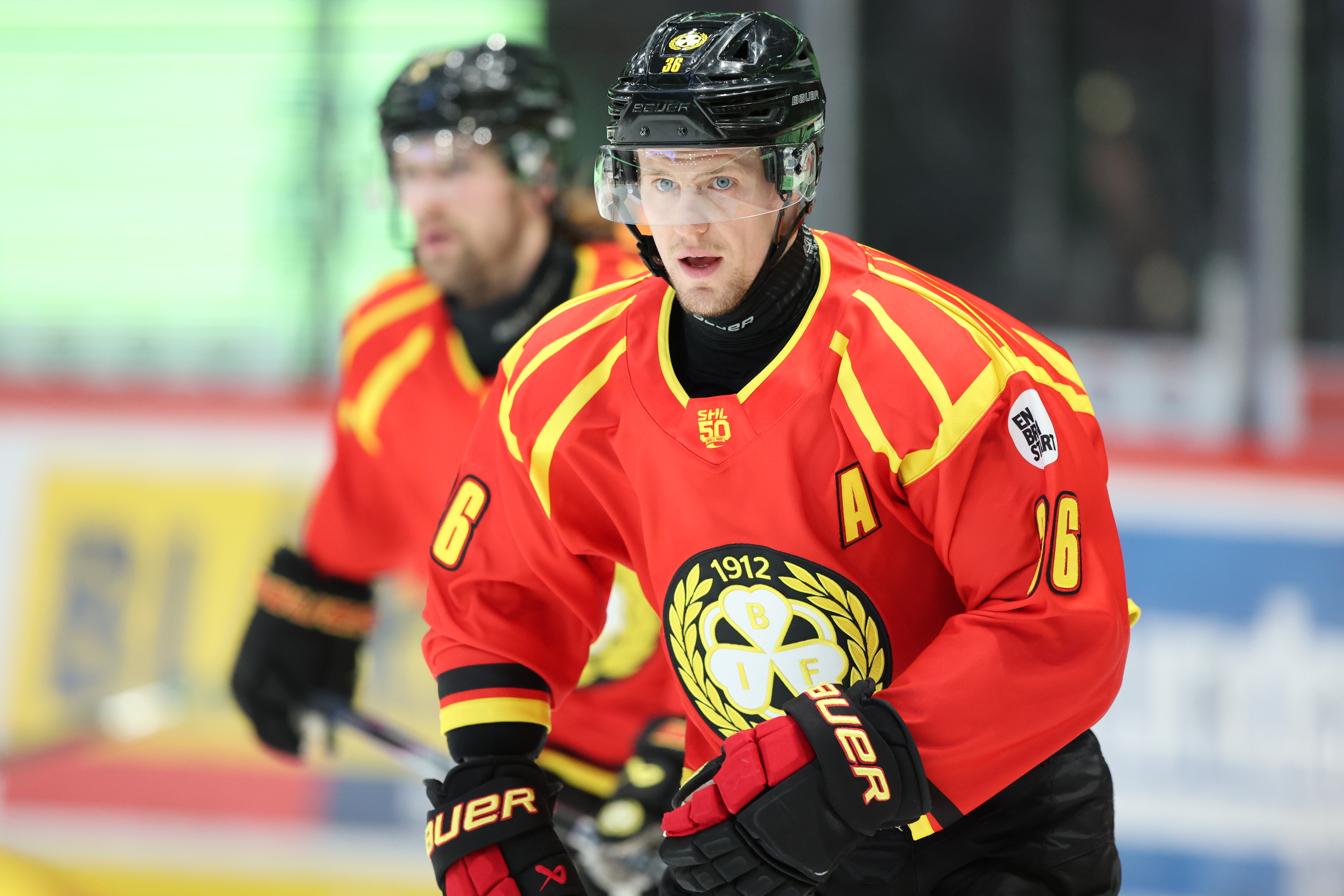
- Born: 5 June 1997 (age 29) Gävle, Sweden
- Height: 180 cm (5 ft 11 in)
- Weight: 84 kg (185 lb; 13 st 3 lb)
- Position: Centre
- Shoots: Left
- SHL team Former teams: Brynäs IF; WBS Penguins
- NHL draft: 155th overall, 2017; Pittsburgh Penguins
- Playing career: 2015–present

Linus Ölund (born 5 June 1997) is a Swedish professional ice hockey center. He is currently playing with Brynäs IF in the Swedish Hockey League (SHL). He was selected by the Pittsburgh Penguins in the fifth round, 155th overall, in the 2017 NHL entry draft.

== Playing career ==
Ölund made his Swedish Hockey League debut playing with Brynäs IF during the 2014–15 SHL season.

Having established career highs in the 2017–18 season, with 8 goals and 15 assists for 23 points with Brynäs, Ölund opted to pursue a North American career, agreeing to a three-year, entry-level contract with the Pittsburgh Penguins starting from the 2018–19 season on 25 April 2018.

In his first season in North America, Ölund was assigned to AHL affiliate, the Wilkes-Barre/Scranton Penguins. Thrust into a defensive checking line role, he found difficulty adapting to the different style of play, producing just 6 goals and 15 points in 61 games.

With the desire to return to Sweden, Ölund was returned to former club, Brynäs IF of the SHL, on loan for the 2019–20 season from the Penguins on 28 June 2019. He made 49 appearances, posting a 4 goals and 14 points. With the season ended prematurely due to COVID-19, Ölund was released from the final year of his entry-level contract with the Pittsburgh Penguins after his contract was mutually terminated on 29 May 2020.

On 1 June 2020, Ölund was signed to a three-year contract to remain his tenure with Brynäs IF.

== Career statistics ==
=== Regular season and playoffs ===
			Regular season					Playoffs
Season	Team	League	GP	G	A	Pts	PIM	GP	G	A	Pts	PIM
2013–14	Brynäs IF	J20	10	1	3	4	2	—	—	—	—	—
2014–15	Brynäs IF	J20	41	15	11	26	10	2	1	1	2	0
2014–15	Brynäs IF	SHL	3	0	0	0	0	—	—	—	—	—
2015–16	Brynäs IF	J20	27	18	16	34	4	4	1	3	4	2
2015–16	Brynäs IF	SHL	23	0	1	1	0	1	0	0	0	0
2016–17	Brynäs IF	J20	12	8	9	17	12	—	—	—	—	—
2016–17	Brynäs IF	SHL	39	8	7	15	2	20	6	4	10	2
2016–17	AIK	Allsv	2	0	0	0	0	—	—	—	—	—
2017–18	Brynäs IF	SHL	51	8	15	23	4	8	2	3	5	2
2018–19	Wilkes-Barre/Scranton Penguins	AHL	61	6	9	15	8	—	—	—	—	—
2019–20	Brynäs IF	SHL	49	4	10	14	6	—	—	—	—	—
2020–21	Brynäs IF	SHL	50	9	11	20	12	—	—	—	—	—
2021–22	Brynäs IF	SHL	51	11	6	17	6	3	1	1	2	2
2022–23	Brynäs IF	SHL	47	10	8	18	12	—	—	—	—	—
2023–24	Brynäs IF	Allsv	37	12	9	21	4	10	1	5	6	2
2024–25	Brynäs IF	SHL	50	5	14	19	10	15	4	1	5	9
SHL totals			363	55	72	127	52	47	13	9	22	15

=== International ===
Year	Team	Event	Result	GP	G	A	Pts	PIM
2014	Sweden	U17	6th	5	1	1	2	0
2014	Sweden	IH18	4th	5	1	1	2	0
2015	Sweden	U18	8th	5	0	5	5	0
Junior totals				15	2	7	9	0
