= David Rautio =

Swedish ice hockey player

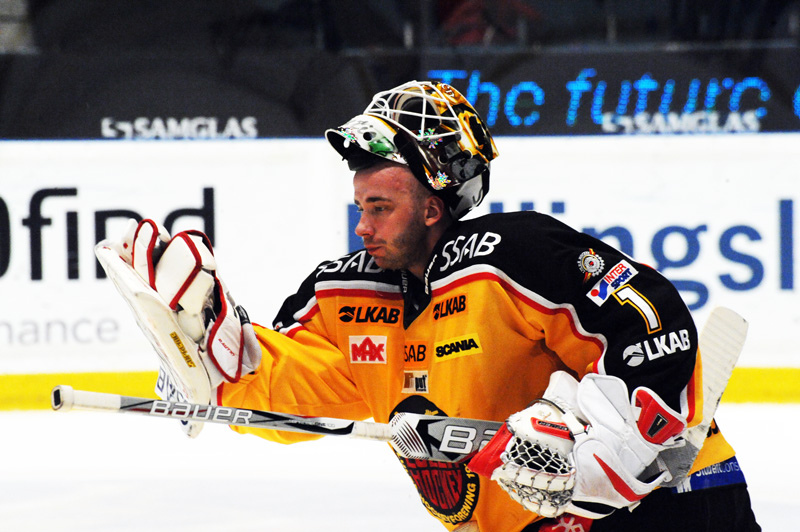
- Born: July 8, 1985 (age 39); Luleå, Sweden
- Height: 5 ft 11 in (180 cm)
- Weight: 176 lb (80 kg; 12 st 8 lb)
- Position: Goaltender
- Caught: Left
- Played for: Luleå HF; Lillehammer IK; Linköping HC; Brynäs IF; Timrå IK; SCL Tigers; Skellefteå AIK
- Playing career: 2005–2025

David Rautio (born July 29, 1985) is a Swedish professional former ice hockey goaltender. He last played for Skellefteå AIK in the Swedish Hockey League.

== Playing career ==
Rautio played youth hockey and has played a large part of his professional career with his hometown club, Luleå HF, of the then Elitserien. He joined Linköping from Luleå, on a two-year contract on April 16, 2014.

Rautio played three seasons with Brynäs IF before leaving as a free agent following the 2018–19 season. On 23 April 2019, he returned for a third stint with original club, Luleå HF, signing a two-year contract. During the 2020–21 season, Rautio would transfer for a second stint with Linköping HC.

On 24 April 2022, Rautio extended his career in the SHL, by agreeing to a one-year contract with Timrå IK for the 2022–23 season. Assuming backup duties, Rautio made just 5 appearances with Timrå IK before opting to leave and sign for the remainder of the season with Swiss NL club, SCL Tigers, on 9 February 2023.
