= Stefan Steen =

Swedish ice hockey player

- Born: January 6, 1993 (age 32) Sunne, Sweden
- Height: 6 ft 2 in (188 cm)
- Weight: 176 lb (80 kg; 12 st 8 lb)
- Position: Goaltender
- Shoots: Left
- ICEHL team Former teams: Vienna Capitals; Skellefteå AIK; Växjö Lakers; Färjestad BK; Örebro HK; Vaasan Sport
- Playing career: 2013–present

Stefan Steen (born January 6, 1993) is a Swedish professional ice hockey goaltender. He is currently playing with the Vienna Capitals of the ICE Hockey League (ICEHL).

He has formerly played with Skellefteå AIK, Växjö Lakers, Färjestad BK and Örebro HK in the Swedish Hockey League (SHL).
