= 2012–13 AIK IF season =

Swedish ice hockey club season

2012–13 AIK
- League: 9th Elitserien
- 2012–13 record: 16-25-7-7
- Goals for: 123
- Goals against: 149
- Arena: Hovet, Ericsson Globe

Team leaders
- Goals: Nicklas Jensen
- Assists: Broc Little
- Points: Broc Little
- Penalty minutes: Patric Blomdahl
- Wins: Daniel Larsson
- Goals against average: Alexander Hamberg

The 2012–13 AIK IF season is AIK's 29th season in the Elitserien ice hockey league (SEL), the top division in Sweden. They finished in ninth place in the regular season and failed to qualify for the playoffs.

== Regular season ==
=== Standings ===
2012–13 Elitserien season	GP	W	L	OTW	OTL	GF	GA	GD	Pts
Skellefteå AIK^{y}	55	34	13	4	4	170	107	63	114
Färjestad BK^{x}	55	27	14	7	7	155	110	45	102
Luleå HF^{x}	55	25	12	9	9	145	102	43	102
HV71^{x}	55	27	16	9	3	155	124	31	102
Linköpings HC^{x}	55	27	19	4	5	145	136	9	94
Frölunda HC^{x}	55	21	21	8	5	123	126	–3	84
Modo Hockey^{x}	55	19	19	7	10	135	129	6	81
Brynäs IF^{x}	55	17	20	6	12	123	166	–43	75
AIK^{e}	55	16	25	7	7	123	149	–26	69
Växjö Lakers HC^{e}	55	14	26	7	8	102	130	–28	64
Timrå IK^{r}	55	12	30	8	5	100	127	–27	57
Rögle BK^{r}	55	10	34	5	6	104	174	–70	46

x – clinched playoff spot; y – clinched regular season league title; e – eliminated from playoff contention; r – play in relegation series
