= Mattias Janmark =

Swedish ice hockey player (born 1992)

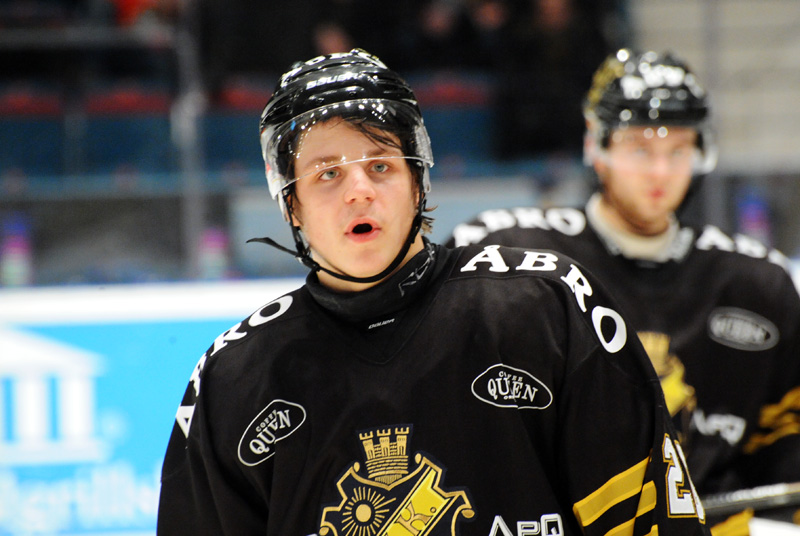
- Janmark with AIK in 2013
- Born: 8 December 1992 (age 33) Stockholm, Sweden
- Height: 6 ft 1 in (185 cm)
- Weight: 205 lb (93 kg; 14 st 9 lb)
- Position: Centre
- NHL team Former teams: Edmonton Oilers; AIK; Frölunda HC; Dallas Stars; Chicago Blackhawks; Vegas Golden Knights
- National team: Sweden
- NHL draft: 79th overall, 2013; Detroit Red Wings
- Playing career: 2011–present

Mattias Janmark Nylén (born 8 December 1992) is a Swedish professional ice hockey player who is a centre for the Edmonton Oilers of the National Hockey League (NHL). He has previously played in the NHL for the Dallas Stars, Chicago Blackhawks and Vegas Golden Knights. Janmark was drafted 79th overall by the Detroit Red Wings in the 2013 NHL entry draft.

== Playing career ==
During the 2009–10 season, Janmark played his first full season with AIK in Stockholm in Sweden's top division after joining the club mid-season from the lower division club SDE HF the previous year. He played for AIK's U20 and U18 teams – appearing in 17 games, including four playoff games, with the U20 team and playing in 34 U18 contests, including one playoff game. Janmark recorded four goals and eight assists in U20 play and had 13 goals with 22 assists for AIK's U18 team. During the 2010–11 season, Janmark skated for AIK Stockholm's U20 team, playing in 40 Super Elit league games. He recorded 11 goals and 17 assists. AIK finished sixth in the Super Elit league's North Division.

During the 2011–12 season, Janmark made his pro debut in Sweden's Elitserien, appearing in 18 games for AIK Stockholm. He had no points in limited ice time in Elitserien play. He appeared in three playoff games with AIK with no points or penalties. Janmark also was the team captain for the club's U20 team. In 40 games for the club's U20 team he was the team's leading scorer with 23 goals and 38 assists. AIK finished fourth in the U20 standings but lost to Färjestads in a first round playoff series. In his second year of draft eligibility, Janmark was ranked 98th amongst European skaters in Central Scouting's final rankings but was not selected in the 2012 NHL entry draft.

During the 2012–13 season, Janmark had an impressive first full season in the Elitserien, finishing as AIK's second-leading scorer behind Broc Little. In 55 games Janmark recorded 14 goals and 17 assists. AIK missed the Elitserien playoffs, finishing six points behind eighth-place Brynäs for the final spot. Following this season, Janmark was drafted by the Detroit Red Wings. On 15 April 2014, at the conclusion of his season with AIK, Janmark was assigned by the Red Wings to the Grand Rapids Griffins on an amateur try-out contract. He made his American Hockey League (AHL) debut on 18 April in a game against the Lake Erie Monsters.

For the following 2014–15 season, Janmark opted to remain in Sweden, signing a one-year contract with Frölunda HC on 3 June 2014. On 1 March 2015, the Red Wings traded Janmark, Mattias Bäckman and a third-round draft pick to the Dallas Stars in exchange for Erik Cole and a second-round draft pick. At the conclusion of the season, having scored 36 points in 55 games, Janmark signed a two-year, entry-level contract with the Stars on 24 April 2015. He was immediately assigned to the Stars' minor league affiliate, the Texas Stars for their playoff run.

Janmark made his NHL debut on 8 October 2015, netting his first career goal on his first shot on his first shift, 99 seconds into the game. After a successful rookie year, he would miss the entire season in 2016–17 due to a knee injury.

On 6 June 2019, the Stars re-signed Janmark to a one-year, $2.3 million contract extension.

Having left the Stars organization as a free agent after four seasons, Janmark signed a one-year, $2.25 million contract with the Chicago Blackhawks on 12 October 2020.

On 12 April 2021, Janmark was traded by the Blackhawks to the Vegas Golden Knights in a three-way trade. He and Chicago's fifth-round draft pick in 2022 were traded to Vegas in exchange for Vegas' second-round draft pick in 2021 as well as a third-round pick in 2022, while the San Jose Sharks received a fifth-round pick in 2022 from Vegas. During the following playoffs, on 28 May 2021, he scored a hat trick for the Golden Knights in the seventh game of their first-round matchup against the Minnesota Wild.

A free agent from the Golden Knights following the 2021–22 season, Janmark signed a one-year, $1.25 million contract with the Edmonton Oilers on 17 July 2022. On 9 November, the Oilers recalled Janmark from their AHL affiliate, the Bakersfield Condors, after Evander Kane suffered an injury.

During game 7 of the 2024 Stanley Cup Final, Janmark scored the Oilers' only goal to tie the game 1–1 with 13 minutes left in the first period, but they eventually lost 2–1 to the Florida Panthers.

On 1 July 2024, the Oilers re-signed Janmark to a three-year, $4.35 million contract extension.

== Career statistics ==
=== Regular season and playoffs ===
			Regular season					Playoffs
Season	Team	League	GP	G	A	Pts	PIM	GP	G	A	Pts	PIM
2007–08	SDE HF	J18	15	3	4	7	10	—	—	—	—	—
2008–09	SDE HF	J18	22	16	21	37	36	—	—	—	—	—
2008–09	AIK	J18 Allsv	12	2	6	8	4	7	5	5	10	2
2009–10	AIK	J18	22	8	17	25	8	—	—	—	—	—
2009–10	AIK	J18 Allsv	11	5	5	10	4	1	0	0	0	0
2009–10	AIK	J20	13	4	7	11	6	4	0	1	1	0
2010–11	AIK	J20	40	11	17	28	34	—	—	—	—	—
2011–12	AIK	J20	40	23	38	61	30	3	0	0	0	4
2011–12	AIK	SEL	18	0	0	0	2	3	0	0	0	0
2012–13	AIK	SEL	55	14	17	31	32	—	—	—	—	—
2013–14	AIK	SHL	45	18	12	30	56	—	—	—	—	—
2013–14	Grand Rapids Griffins	AHL	2	0	0	0	2	6	0	1	1	0
2014–15	Frölunda HC	SHL	55	13	23	36	30	13	4	3	7	4
2014–15	Texas Stars	AHL	—	—	—	—	—	1	0	0	0	0
2015–16	Dallas Stars	NHL	73	15	14	29	16	12	2	3	5	2
2017–18	Dallas Stars	NHL	81	19	15	34	24	—	—	—	—	—
2018–19	Dallas Stars	NHL	81	6	19	25	24	7	1	2	3	8
2019–20	Dallas Stars	NHL	62	6	15	21	12	26	1	7	8	38
2020–21	Chicago Blackhawks	NHL	41	10	9	19	8	—	—	—	—	—
2020–21	Vegas Golden Knights	NHL	15	1	4	5	2	16	4	4	8	0
2021–22	Vegas Golden Knights	NHL	67	9	16	25	21	—	—	—	—	—
2022–23	Bakersfield Condors	AHL	4	2	2	4	2	—	—	—	—	—
2022–23	Edmonton Oilers	NHL	66	10	15	25	30	5	0	1	1	2
2023–24	Edmonton Oilers	NHL	71	4	8	12	46	25	4	4	8	12
2024–25	Edmonton Oilers	NHL	80	2	16	18	22	22	3	1	4	14
2025–26	Edmonton Oilers	NHL	43	1	7	8	22	—	—	—	—	—
SHL totals			173	45	52	97	120	16	4	3	7	4
NHL totals			680	83	138	221	227	113	15	22	37	76

Medal record

Representing Sweden

Ice hockey

World Championships
Gold medal – first place	2018 Denmark	

=== International ===
Year	Team	Event	Result	GP	G	A	Pts	PIM
2018	Sweden	WC	1st place, gold medalist(s)	10	4	6	10	8
Senior totals				10	4	6	10	8
