= Marcus Lindblom (ice hockey) =

Swedish ice hockey player

- Born: February 7, 1995 (age 30) Gävle, Sweden
- Height: 6 ft 0 in (183 cm)
- Weight: 183 lb (83 kg; 13 st 1 lb)
- Position: Centre
- Shoots: Left
- Div.1 team Former teams: Valbo HC; Brynäs IF
- Playing career: 2015–present

Marcus Lindblom (born February 7, 1995) is a Swedish professional ice hockey player for Strömsbro IF of the Hockeyettan. His younger brother, Oskar is also a professional hockey player for the San Jose Sharks.

Lindblom made his Swedish Hockey League debut playing with Brynäs IF during the 2014–15 SHL season.
