= Johannes Nilsson =

Swedish ice hockey player

- Born: March 16, 1995 (age 30); Sweden
- Height: 5 ft 11 in (180 cm)
- Weight: 181 lb (82 kg; 12 st 13 lb)
- Position: Forward
- Shoots: Left
- SHL team: Brynäs IF
- NHL draft: Undrafted
- Playing career: 2014–present

Johannes Nilsson (born March 16, 1995) is a Swedish ice hockey player. He is currently playing with Brynäs IF of the Swedish Hockey League (SHL).

Nilsson made his Swedish Hockey League debut playing with Brynäs IF during the 2014–15 SHL season.
