= Jani Lajunen =

Finnish ice hockey player

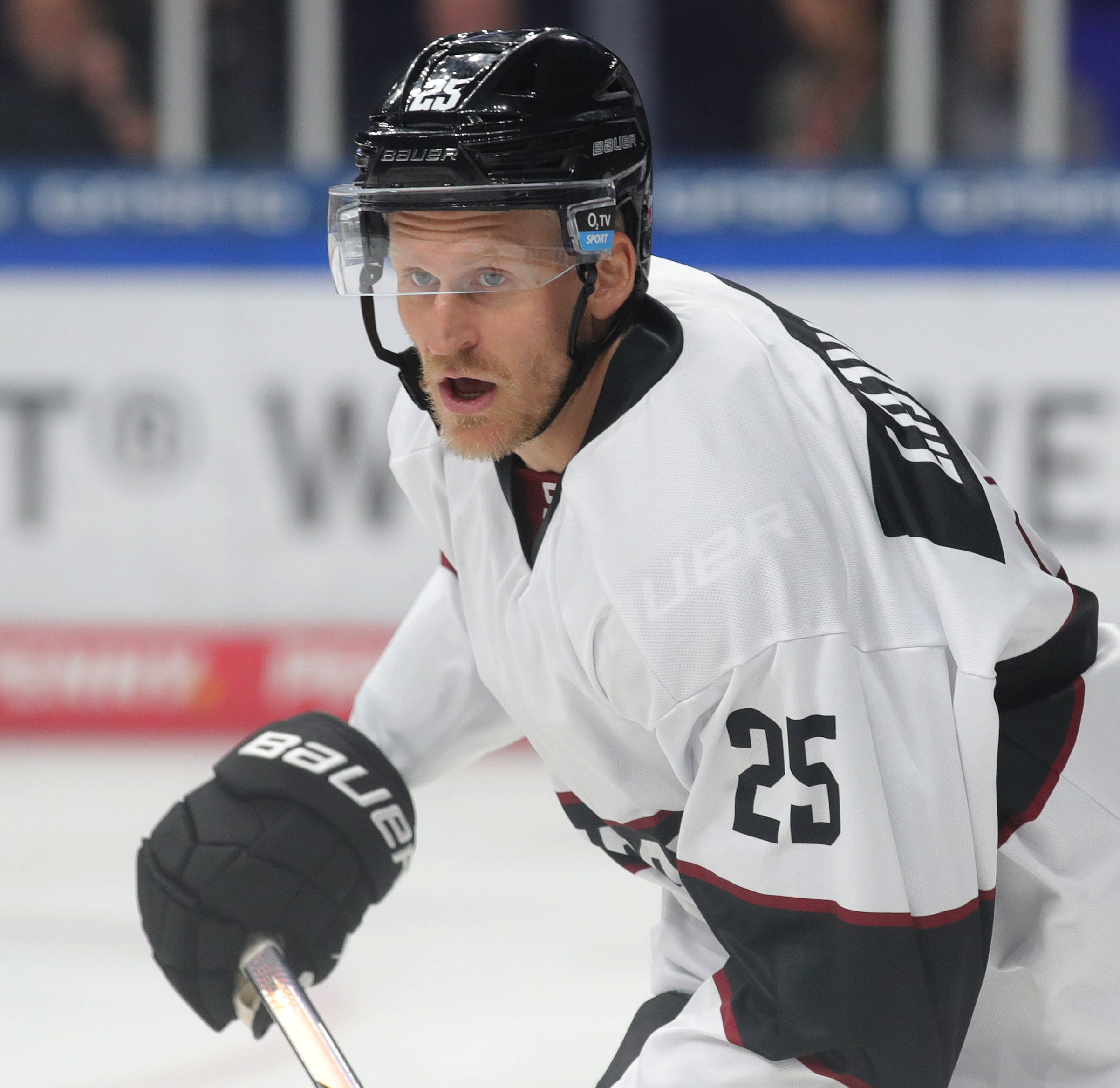
- Lajunen in 2023
- Born: 16 June 1990 (age 36) Espoo, Finland
- Height: 6 ft 1 in (185 cm)
- Weight: 165 lb (75 kg; 11 st 11 lb)
- Position: Centre
- Shoots: Left
- SHL team Former teams: Örebro HK; Espoo Blues; Milwaukee Admirals; Peoria Rivermen; Växjö Lakers; Tappara; HC Lugano
- National team: Finland
- NHL draft: 201st overall, 2008; Nashville Predators
- Playing career: 2008–present

Jani Lajunen (born 16 June 1990) is a Finnish professional ice hockey forward who is currently playing with HC Sparta Praha of the Czech Hockey League (EHL). He was selected by the Nashville Predators in the 7th round (201st overall) of the 2008 NHL entry draft.

== Playing career ==
Having made his debut in SM-liiga in 2008, he made quick progress and became one of the key players with Espoo Blues. He was selected to the Finnish national team for the 2011 IIHF World Championship. At the age of 20 he scored his first national team goal against Norway in the quarterfinals at his second game of the tournament. Lajunen also scored a goal in the semifinals against Russia. Team Finland went all the way to the final game and swept Sweden 6–1, winning Finland's second IIHF World Championship gold medal to date.

19 February 2013, Lajunen was traded by the Predators to the St. Louis Blues for fellow minor leaguer Scott Ford. He then played for Växjö Lakers of the Swedish Hockey League for two seasons before returning to Finland in joining Tappara on a two-year deal, commencing from the 2015–16 season.

On 5 May 2017 Lajunen agreed to a two-year contract with HC Lugano of the National League (NL). On 24 December 2018, Lajunen was signed to an early two-year contract extension by Lugano through to the end of the 2020–21 season.

On 20 May 2021, Lajunen left the Swiss National League as a free agent after four seasons and returned to the SHL, in agreeing to a two-year contract with Örebro HK.

== Career statistics ==
=== Regular season and playoffs ===
			Regular season					Playoffs
Season	Team	League	GP	G	A	Pts	PIM	GP	G	A	Pts	PIM
2006–07	Blues	FIN U18	28	5	12	17	20	—	—	—	—	—
2007–08	Blues	FIN U18	1	1	0	1	2	—	—	—	—	—
2007–08	Blues	Jr. A	25	4	10	14	14	3	0	0	0	0
2007–08	Blues	SM-l	1	0	0	0	0	—	—	—	—	—
2008–09	Blues	Jr. A	25	16	10	26	24	8	2	1	3	12
2008–09	Blues	SM-l	25	1	1	2	4	2	0	0	0	0
2009–10	Blues	Jr. A	4	1	1	2	0	—	—	—	—	—
2009–10	Blues	SM-l	46	6	9	15	34	3	0	0	0	2
2010–11	Blues	SM-l	60	10	12	22	46	18	3	4	7	12
2011–12	Milwaukee Admirals	AHL	75	5	11	16	18	3	1	0	1	0
2012–13	Milwaukee Admirals	AHL	40	1	4	5	14	—	—	—	—	—
2012–13	Peoria Rivermen	AHL	19	1	1	2	4	—	—	—	—	—
2013–14	Växjö Lakers	SHL	44	8	12	20	16	12	1	0	1	4
2014–15	Växjö Lakers	SHL	48	5	15	20	35	18	6	5	11	8
2015–16	Tappara	Liiga	58	16	17	33	18	18	4	6	10	6
2016–17	Tappara	Liiga	59	14	21	35	22	18	2	7	9	8
2017–18	HC Lugano	NL	42	6	19	25	20	16	3	11	14	8
2018–19	HC Lugano	NL	41	8	15	23	14	4	0	1	1	2
2019–20	HC Lugano	NL	49	7	19	26	18	—	—	—	—	—
2020–21	HC Lugano	NL	38	9	12	21	24	5	1	0	1	0
2021–22	Örebro HK	SHL	50	9	16	25	26	8	1	1	2	2
Liiga totals			249	47	60	107	124	59	9	17	26	28
NL totals			170	30	65	95	76	25	4	12	16	12

=== International ===
Medal record

Representing Finland

Ice hockey

World Championships
Gold medal – first place	2011 Slovakia	
Silver medal – second place	2016 Russia	

Year	Team	Event	GP	G	A	Pts	PIM
2008	Finland	U18	6	1	0	1	2
2009	Finland	WJC	6	1	0	1	0
2010	Finland	WJC	6	1	4	5	6
2011	Finland	WC	4	2	1	3	2
2016	Finland	WC	6	0	0	0	2
2017	Finland	WC	10	1	1	2	4
2018	Finland	OG	4	0	1	1	6
Junior totals			18	3	4	7	8
Senior totals			24	3	3	6	14
