= Nick Johnson (ice hockey, born 1985) =

Canadian Ice hockey player

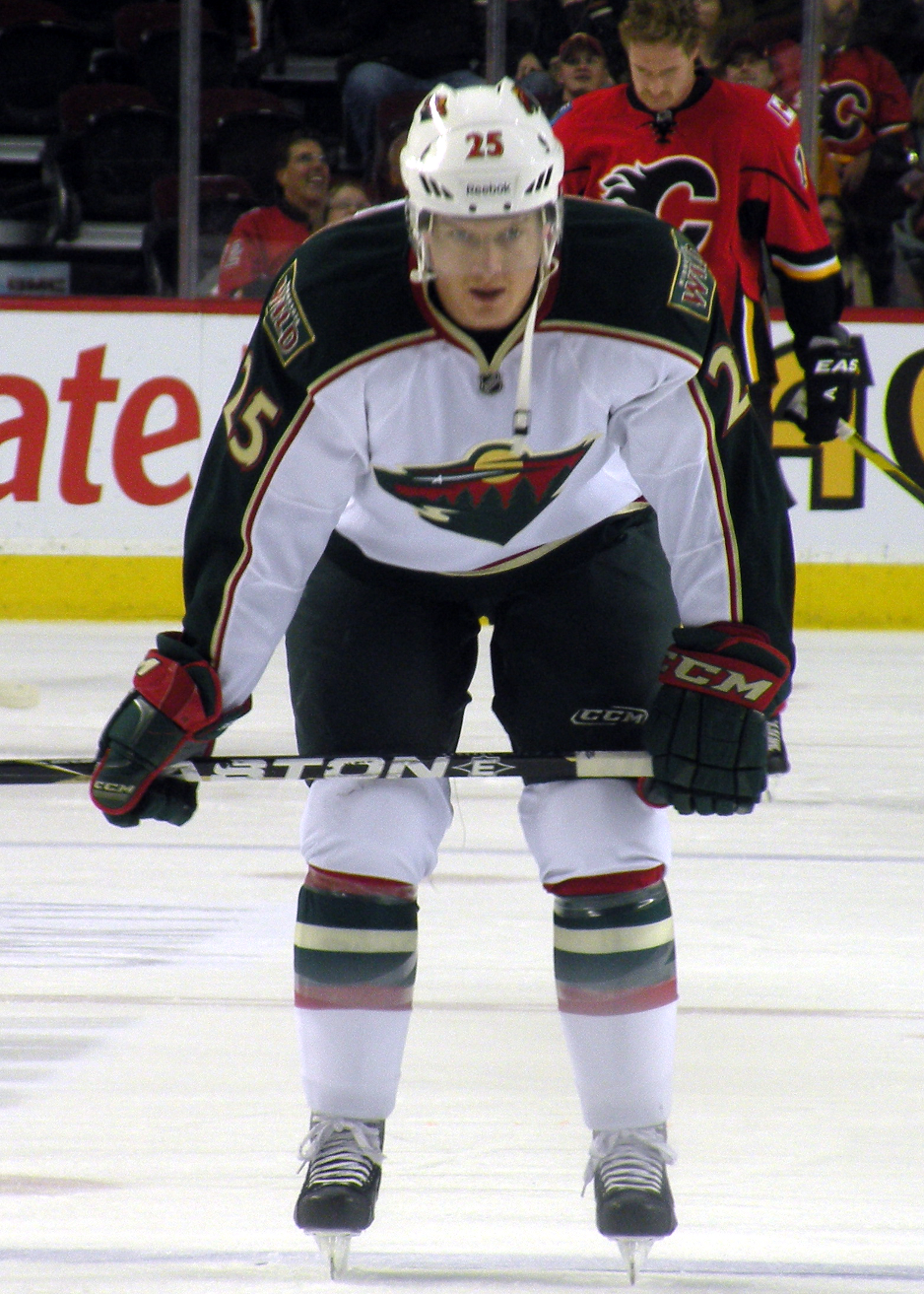
- Nick Johnson playing an away game for the Minnesota Wild against the Calgary Flames in the National Hockey League in November 2011.
- Born: December 24, 1985 (age 40) Calgary, Alberta, Canada
- Height: 6 ft 2 in (188 cm)
- Weight: 200 lb (91 kg; 14 st 4 lb)
- Position: Right wing
- Shot: Right
- Played for: Pittsburgh Penguins; Minnesota Wild; Phoenix Coyotes; Boston Bruins; Växjö Lakers; Brynäs IF
- NHL draft: 67th overall, 2004; Pittsburgh Penguins
- Playing career: 2008–2017

Nicholas VanCuran Johnson (born December 24, 1985) is a Canadian former professional ice hockey forward who played in the National Hockey League (NHL) with the Pittsburgh Penguins, Minnesota Wild and the Phoenix Coyotes.

== Playing career ==
He was drafted by the Pittsburgh Penguins 67th overall in the 2004 NHL entry draft. Before being drafted, Johnson played for the St. Albert Saints of the Alberta Junior Hockey League. After graduating high school and being drafted, Johnson played four seasons with Dartmouth of ECAC Hockey in the NCAA. Following his final season at Dartmouth, Johnson signed a two-year, entry-level contract with the Penguins on March 25, 2008. He shortly began his professional career with affiliate the Wilkes-Barre/Scranton Penguins of the American Hockey League.

In the 2009–10 season, Johnson scored his first career NHL goal in his NHL debut on January 21, 2010, with the Penguins against the Washington Capitals. He played in 6 games with the Pittsburgh before returning the Wilkes-Barre. On June 7, 2010, he was re-signed to a one-year contract with the Penguins.

On September 29, 2011, Johnson was claimed off waivers by the Minnesota Wild. In the 2011–12 season, Johnson earned a regular checking line role on the Wild, playing in a career high 77 games to recorded 8 goals and 26 points.

Despite his successful season with the Wild, Johnson was released as a free agent and on July 11, 2012, he was signed on a one-year, two-way deal with the Phoenix Coyotes. With the NHL lockout in effect, Johnson signed for a brief stint with the Idaho Steelheads of the ECHL. Upon conclusion of the lockout he was assigned to AHL affiliate, the Portland Pirates. He was later recalled by the Coyotes in the shortened 2012–13 season and appeared in 17 games for the Coyotes before on March 13, 2013, he was put on waivers and reassigned to Portland.

On July 5, 2013, Johnson was signed to a one-year, two-way contract with the Boston Bruins.

On July 9, 2014, Johnson left the Bruins organization after one season and signed his first contract abroad on a one-year deal with the Växjö Lakers of the Swedish Hockey League.

== Career statistics ==
			Regular season					Playoffs
Season	Team	League	GP	G	A	Pts	PIM	GP	G	A	Pts	PIM
2002–03	St. Albert Saints	AJHL	60	21	30	51	10	—	—	—	—	—
2003–04	St. Albert Saints	AJHL	51	35	36	71	33	4	0	2	2	0
2004–05	Dartmouth College	ECAC	35	18	17	35	16	—	—	—	—	—
2005–06	Dartmouth College	ECAC	33	15	10	25	24	—	—	—	—	—
2006–07	Dartmouth College	ECAC	33	14	16	30	46	—	—	—	—	—
2007–08	Dartmouth College	ECAC	32	10	25	35	20	—	—	—	—	—
2007–08	Wilkes–Barre/Scranton Penguins	AHL	4	0	1	1	0	10	0	1	1	2
2008–09	Wheeling Nailers	ECHL	18	14	10	24	19	—	—	—	—	—
2008–09	Wilkes–Barre/Scranton Penguins	AHL	56	14	17	31	30	12	4	6	10	8
2009–10	Wilkes–Barre/Scranton Penguins	AHL	61	16	27	43	50	4	4	0	4	2
2009–10	Pittsburgh Penguins	NHL	6	1	1	2	2	—	—	—	—	—
2010–11	Wilkes–Barre/Scranton Penguins	AHL	48	20	19	39	49	—	—	—	—	—
2010–11	Pittsburgh Penguins	NHL	4	1	2	3	5	—	—	—	—	—
2011–12	Minnesota Wild	NHL	77	8	18	26	45	—	—	—	—	—
2012–13	Idaho Steelheads	ECHL	5	0	1	1	0	—	—	—	—	—
2012–13	Portland Pirates	AHL	14	3	6	9	13	3	2	1	3	9
2012–13	Phoenix Coyotes	NHL	17	4	2	6	0	—	—	—	—	—
2013–14	Providence Bruins	AHL	51	18	24	42	16	12	1	4	5	0
2013–14	Boston Bruins	NHL	9	0	0	0	0	—	—	—	—	—
2014–15	Växjö Lakers	SHL	55	17	21	38	14	18	4	5	9	8
2015–16	Brynäs IF	SHL	52	22	12	34	16	3	3	2	5	0
2016–17	Brynäs IF	SHL	39	7	11	18	16	5	0	0	0	2
AHL totals			234	71	94	166	158	41	11	12	23	21
NHL totals			113	14	23	37	52	—	—	—	—	—
SHL totals			146	46	44	90	46	26	7	7	14	10

== Awards and honors ==
Award	Year
All-ECAC Hockey Rookie Team	2004–05
All-ECAC Hockey First Team	2007–08
