= List of Växjö Lakers seasons =

This is a list of seasons of the Växjö Lakers HC, a Swedish ice hockey club based in Växjö.

Season	Level	Division	Record		Avg. home atnd.	Notes
Season	Level	Division	Position	W-T-L W-OT-L	Avg. home atnd.	Notes
1997–98	Tier 6	Division 4	?	?	?	
1998–99	Tier 6	Division 4	1st	13–1–0	?	▲ Promoted to Division 2
1999–00	Tier 4	Division 2	3rd	10–0–4	?	
2000–01	Tier 4	Division 2	1st	13–1–0	?	▲ Promoted to Division 1
2001–02	Tier 3	Division 1: South: B	1st	14–2–2	?	
2001–02	Tier 3	Div. 1: South: Allettan	4th	7–0–7	?	
2001–02	Tier 3	Div. 1: South: Final round	1st	4–0–2	?	
2001–02	2002 Allsvenskan qualifier (south)		4th	4–1–5	2,651	
2002–03	Tier 3	Division 1: South	1st	34–7–3	?	
2002–03	Tier 3	Div 1: South: Final round A	1st	6–0–0	?	
2002–03	2003 Allsvenskan qualifier (south)		1st	10–0–0	2,745	▲ Promoted to Allsvenskan
2003–04	Tier 2	Allsvenskan South	7th	16–8–8	2,881	
2003–04	Tier 2	Allsvenskan South (spring)	2nd	9–2–3	2,920	
2003–04	Tier 2	Playoff to Elitserien qual.	—	3–2	3,938	1st round: 2–0 vs Sundsvall, 2nd round: 1–2 vs Skellefteå
2004–05	Tier 2	Allsvenskan South	5th	13–8–9	2,870	
2004–05	Tier 2	Allsvenskan South (spring)	2nd	8–2–2	2,730	
2004–05	Tier 2	Playoff to Elitserien qual.	—	0–2	3,200	1st round: 0–2 vs Nyköping
2005–06	Tier 2	HockeyAllsvenskan	10th	14–11–17	2,581	
2006–07	Tier 2	HockeyAllsvenskan	6th	21–9–15	2,634	
2006–07	Tier 2	Playoff to Elitserien qual.	—	1–2	2,672	1st round: 1–2 vs Björklöven
2007–08	Tier 2	HockeyAllsvenskan	6th	20–10–15	2,573	
2007–08	Tier 2	Playoff to Elitserien qual.	—	1–2	2,642	1st round, 1–2 vs Västerås
2008–09	Tier 2	HockeyAllsvenskan	5th	22–5–3–5	2,486	
2008–09	Tier 2	Playoff to Elitserien qual.	—	4–1	2,952	1st round: 2–0 vs Troja/Ljungby, 2nd round: 2–1 vs Almtuna
2008–09	2009 Elitserien qualifier		5th	3–0–1–6	2,639	
2009–10	Tier 2	HockeyAllsvenskan	3rd	29–4–7–12	2,493	
2009–10	2010 Elitserien qualifier		6th	1–1–1–7	2,790	
2010–11	Tier 2	HockeyAllsvenskan	1st	33–5–14	2,749	
2010–11	2011 Elitserien qualifier		1st	7–2–1–0	3,521	▲ Promoted to Elitserien
2011–12	Tier 1	Elitserien	9th	18–8–7–22	5,099	
2012–13	Tier 1	Elitserien	10th	14–7–8–26	5,042	
2013–14	Tier 1	SHL	3rd	23–7–11–14	5,021	
2013–14	Swedish Championship playoffs		—	6–8	5,619	Lost in semifinals, 2–4 vs Färjestad BK
2014–15	Tier 1	SHL	3rd	24–9–6–16	4,980	
2014–15	Swedish Championship playoffs		—	12–6	5,629	Won finals, 4–2 vs Skellefteå AIK
2015–16	Tier 1	SHL	6th	25–4–4–19	4,947	
2015–16	Swedish Championship playoffs		—	7–6	5,629	Lost in semifinals, 3–4 vs Skellefteå AIK
2016–17	Tier 1	SHL	1st	26–7–7–12	4,757	
2016–17	Swedish Championship playoffs		—	2–4	5,629	Lost in quarterfinals, 2–4 vs Malmö Redhawks
2017–18	Tier 1	SHL	1st	34–6–2–10	4,658	
2017–18	Swedish Championship playoffs		—	12–1	5,629	Won finals, 4–0 vs Skellefteå AIK
2018–19	Tier 1	SHL	7th	22–3–10–17	4,691	
2018–19	Eighth-finals		—	2–0	4,579	Won 2–0 vs Örebro HK
2018–19	Swedish Championship playoffs		—	1–4	5,223	Lost in quarterfinals, 1–4 vs Luleå HF
2019–20	Tier 1	SHL	10th	20–4–2–26	4,835	
2019–20	Swedish Championship playoffs		—	—	—	Playoffs cancelled due to COVID-19 pandemic
2020–21	Tier 1	SHL	1st	34–6–1–11	21	
2020–21	Swedish Championship playoffs		—	11–3	8	Won finals, 4–1 vs Rögle BK
2021–22	Tier 1	SHL	5th	28–5–2–17	3,691	
2021–22	Swedish Championship playoffs		—	0–4	5,420	Lost in quarterfinals 0–4 vs Frölunda HC
2022–23	Tier 1	SHL	1st	27–7–7–11	4,760	
2022–23	Swedish Championship playoffs		—	12–6	5,509	Won finals, 4–1 vs Skellefteå AIK
2023–24	Tier 1	SHL	2nd	29–4–4–15	4,952	
2023–24	Swedish Championship playoffs		—	4–4	5,564	Lost in semifinals 0–4 vs Rögle BK
2024–25	Tier 1	SHL	8th	17–9–7–19	5,111	
2024–25	Eighth-finals		—	2–1	5,257	Won 2–1 vs Örebro HK
2024–25	Swedish Championship playoffs		—	1–4	5,342	Lost in quarterfinals 1–4 vs Luleå HF
