= Cristopher Nihlstorp =

Swedish ice hockey player

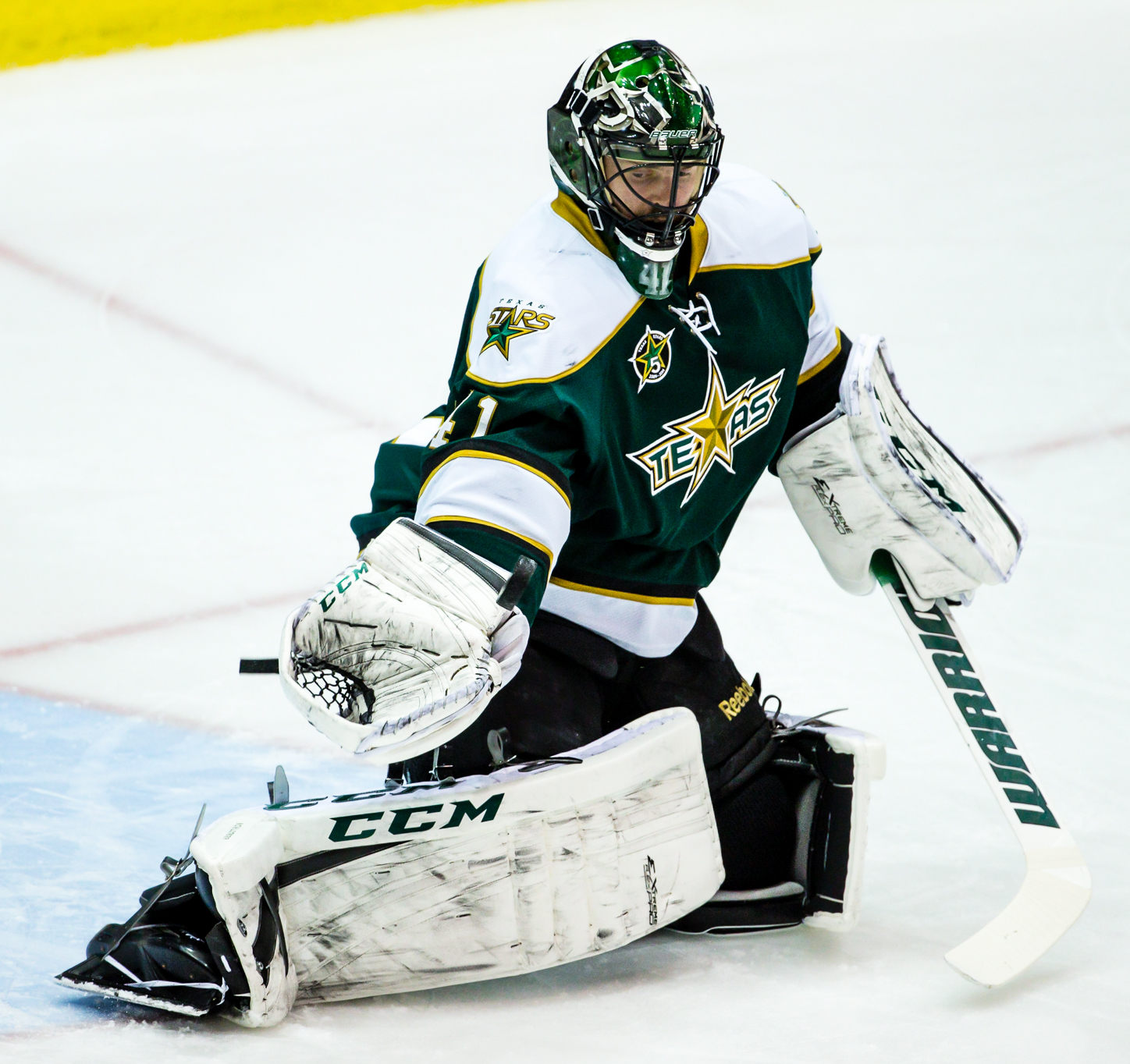
- Nihlstorp in 2014
- Born: 16 February 1984 (age 42) Malmö, Sweden
- Height: 6 ft 3 in (191 cm)
- Weight: 192 lb (87 kg; 13 st 10 lb)
- Position: Goaltender
- Caught: Right
- Played for: Rungsted Seier Capital; Graz 99ers Malmö Redhawks; Växjö Lakers; Dallas Stars; Färjestads BK; Rögle BK
- NHL draft: Undrafted
- Playing career: 2003–2021

Cristopher Daniel Karlsson-Nilstorp (born 16 February 1984) is a Swedish former professional ice hockey goaltender. He played 6 games in the National Hockey League with the Dallas Stars during the 2012–13 and 2013–14 seasons. The rest of his career, which lasted from 2003 to 2021, was mainly spent in the Swedish Hockey League. He currently serves as the goaltending coach for the Malmö Redhawks.

== Playing career ==
Undrafted, Nilstorp's youth team was the Malmö Redhawks. After helping Rögle BK gain promotion to the then Swedish Elite League and later capturing a Championship title with Färjestads BK, on 5 June 2012 Nihlstorp signed a one-year, two-way contract with the Dallas Stars. In the 2012–13 season, Nilstorp made his NHL debut with the Stars, appearing in 5 games for 1 win.

In his second season within the Stars organization, Nilstorp failed to establish an NHL roster spot. However, he helped lead affiliate, the Texas Stars of the American Hockey League (AHL), to their first Calder Cup Championship in the 2013–14 season.

Two days after capturing the Calder Cup, Nilstorp opted to return to Sweden in search of a first choice goaltending role on a two-year contract with Växjö Lakers of the SHL on 23 June 2014. Following his two-year stint with Växjö, he returned to the Malmö Redhawks for the 2016–17 season.

On 30 April 2019, Nihlstorp left the Redhawks and the SHL, agreeing to a one-year contract with Austrian club, Graz 99ers of the EBEL.

== Career statistics ==
=== Regular season and playoffs ===
			Regular season										Playoffs
Season	Team	League	GP	W	L	T	OTL	MIN	GA	SO	GAA	SV%	GP	W	L	MIN	GA	SO	GAA	SV%
2000–01	Malmö Redhawks J18	SWE U18	8	—	—	—	—	—	—	—	4.27	.880	—	—	—	—	—	—	—	—
2001–02	Malmö Redhawks J20	SWE U20	9	—	—	—	—	—	—	—	3.95	.853	—	—	—	—	—	—	—	—
2002–03	Malmö Redhawks J20	SWE U20	29	—	—	—	—	—	—	—	2.88	.908	6	—	—	—	—	—	3.67	.880
2003–04	Malmö Redhawks	SWE	5	2	2	0	—	—	—	0	3.33	.859	—	—	—	—	—	—	—	—
2003–04	Malmö Redhawks J20	SWE U20	22	—	—	—	—	—	—	2	2.19	.914	8	—	—	—	—	—	2.25	.920
2004–05	Malmö Redhawks	SWE	4	0	3	0	—	—	—	0	3.06	.878	—	—	—	—	—	—	—	—
2004–05	Malmö Redhawks J20	SWE U20	1	—	—	—	—	—	—	2	1.00	.958	—	—	—	—	—	—	—	—
2004–05	Mörrums GoIS IK	SWE-2	18	—	—	—	—	—	—	—	3.46	.892	—	—	—	—	—	—	—	—
2005–06	Malmö Redhawks J20	SWE U20	11	—	—	—	—	—	—	0	2.64	.909	—	—	—	—	—	—	—	—
2005–06	Malmö Redhawks	SWE-2	1	1	0	—	0	—	—	0	3.00	.864	—	—	—	—	—	—	—	—
2005–06	Nybro Vikings IF	SWE-2	8	3	4	—	0	—	—	1	3.22	.912	—	—	—	—	—	—	—	—
2006–07	Rögle BK J20	SWE U20	2	—	—	—	—	—	—	1	1.20	.957	—	—	—	—	—	—	—	—
2006–07	Rögle BK	SWE-2	7	4	1	—	1	—	—	1	1.28	.957	—	—	—	—	—	—	—	—
2006–07	Jonstorps IF	SWE-3	1	—	—	—	—	—	—	—	4.02	.867	—	—	—	—	—	—	—	—
2007–08	Rögle BK	SWE-2	30	21	6	—	1	—	—	4	1.88	.929	—	—	—	—	—	—	—	—
2008–09	Rögle BK	SWE	15	5	8	—	0	782	45	0	3.45	.883	—	—	—	—	—	—	—	—
2008–09	Växjö Lakers	SWE-2	1	1	0	—	0	—	—	0	2.00	.895	—	—	—	—	—	—	—	—
2009–10	Rögle BK	SWE	33	9	22	—	0	1949	98	1	3.02	.904	—	—	—	—	—	—	—	—
2010–11	Färjestad BK	SWE	23	13	8	—	0	1268	46	2	2.18	.924	5	4	1	—	—	0	1.60	.944
2011–12	Färjestad BK	SWE	45	22	19	—	0	2590	88	5	2.04	.928	7	—	—	400	12	1	1.80	.944
2012–13	Dallas Stars	NHL	5	1	3	—	1	292	15	0	3.09	.897	—	—	—	—	—	—	—	—
2012–13	Texas Stars	AHL	39	19	13	—	3	2146	85	4	2.38	.907	9	4	5	547	21	1	2.30	.922
2013–14	Dallas Stars	NHL	1	0	0	—	0	40	3	0	4.56	.824	—	—	—	—	—	—	—	—
2013–14	Texas Stars	AHL	45	27	12	—	4	2570	105	3	2.45	.918	19	13	5	1051	38	1	2.17	.919
2014–15	Växjö Lakers	SWE	38	22	13	—	0	2135	70	5	1.97	.913	16	11	5	—	—	3	1.66	.924
2015–16	Växjö Lakers	SWE	38	19	18	—	0	2202	93	3	2.53	.898	10	6	4	—	—	0	2.02	.914
2016–17	Malmö Redhawks	SWE	23	7	14	—	0	1312	60	1	2.74	.900	4	2	2	—	—	0	3.16	.875
2017–18	Malmö Redhawks	SWE	2	1	0	—	0	80	1	0	0.75	.966	—	—	—	—	—	—	—	—
2018–19	Malmö Redhawks	SWE	18	4	12	—	0	879	43	2	2.94	.909	—	—	—	—	—	—	—	—
2019–20	Graz 99ers	EBEL	33	18	14	—	0	1938	90	0	2.79	.914	3	1	2	—	—	0	2.75	.934
2020–21	Rungsted Seier Capital	DEN	32	—	—	—	—	—	—	—	—	.912	—	—	—	—	—	—	—	.923
NHL totals			6	1	3	—	1	331	18	0	3.26	.890	—	—	—	—	—	—	—	—

== Awards and honors ==
Award	Year
SHL
Le Mat trophy	2011, 2015
AHL
Calder Cup (Texas Stars)	2014
