= Markusson =

Markusson is a surname. Notable people with the surname include:

- Johan Markusson (born 1979), Swedish ice hockey player
- Kjersti Markusson (born 1955), Norwegian politician
