= Oskar Lindblom =

Swedish ice hockey player (born 1996)

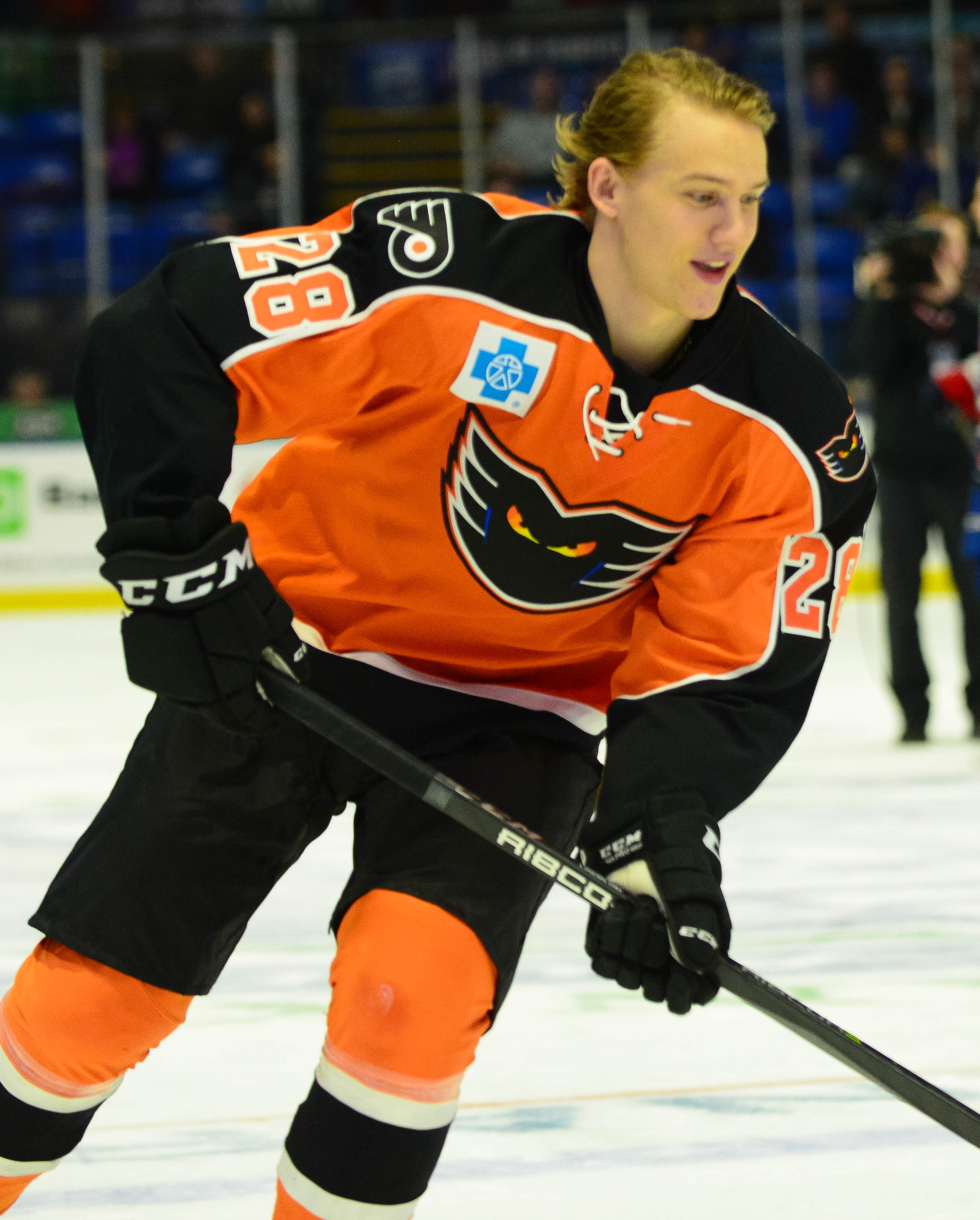
- Lindblom with the Lehigh Valley Phantoms in 2018
- Born: 15 August 1996 (age 30) Gävle, Sweden
- Height: 185 cm (6 ft 1 in)
- Weight: 87 kg (192 lb; 13 st 10 lb)
- Position: Left wing
- Shoots: Left
- SHL team Former teams: Brynäs IF; Philadelphia Flyers; San Jose Sharks
- National team: Sweden
- NHL draft: 138th overall, 2014; Philadelphia Flyers
- Playing career: 2014–present

Oskar Lindblom (born 15 August 1996) is a Swedish professional ice hockey player who is a left winger for Brynäs IF of the Swedish Hockey League (SHL). He formerly played with the Philadelphia Flyers and San Jose Sharks of the National Hockey League (NHL).

== Early life ==
Lindblom was born on 15 August 1996 in Gävle, Sweden. One of his childhood idols was Washington Capitals player Nicklas Bäckström, also from Gävle. Lindblom's father Johan played for several Swedish hockey teams. Lindblom and his two brothers, Marcus and Linus, began playing hockey at a young age, helped by their father.

All three brothers began playing hockey in the Brynäs IF junior ice hockey system. He was named as captain for the Brynäs under-16 team in the 2011–12 season, but was promoted to the under-18 team after scoring 18 points in nine games. He made two appearances at the TV-pucken tournament, playing for Gästrikland in 2011 and 2012. In his first year, Lindblom was second on the team in goals (four) and points (seven). The next year, as alternate captain, he scored 20 points in eight games, the second-highest of anyone in the tournament. Going into the draft, Lindblom had 13 goals and 33 points in 43 games with Brynäs in the J20 SuperElit, the highest level of junior play in Sweden.

== Playing career ==
Lindblom's career began with Brynäs IF, where he played on the U16, U18 and U20 junior teams. Beginning with the 2014–15 season, his outstanding play earned him a spot on their professional team who compete in the Swedish Hockey League, the country's top division. Lindblom was selected by Lokomotiv Yaroslavl in the 5th round (163rd overall) of the 2013 KHL Junior Draft. He was selected by the Philadelphia Flyers in the fifth round (138th overall) of the 2014 NHL entry draft. In the 2016–17 season with Brynäs IF, Lindblom finished fourth in scoring league-wide with 47 points in 52 games. He was named Forward of the Year at the end of the season.

=== Philadelphia Flyers ===
On 30 May 2017, Lindblom was signed to a three-year, entry-level contract with the Philadelphia Flyers. He was then assigned to the Flyers American Hockey League (AHL) affiliate, the Lehigh Valley Phantoms. On 18 January 2018, Lindblom was selected to replace Phantoms teammate Danick Martel at the 2018 AHL All-Star game. Lindblom was called up to the NHL for the first time on 19 February 2018, and played his first career NHL game two days later against the Montreal Canadiens. He recorded his first NHL point on 17 March against the Carolina Hurricanes. The next day against the Washington Capitals, Lindblom scored his first career NHL goal in a 6–3 win. Following the Flyers defeat in Round 1 of the 2018 Stanley Cup playoffs, Lindblom was loaned to the Phantoms to play in their post-season.

On 13 December 2019, Lindblom was diagnosed with Ewing's sarcoma, a form of bone cancer. The diagnosis was expected to effectively end his season. On 2 July 2020, Lindblom completed his chemotherapy treatments. Following his cancer battle, Lindblom was named as one of three finalists for the 2019–20 Masterton Trophy alongside Bobby Ryan and Stephen Johns.

On 22 July 2020, the Flyers signed Lindblom to a three-year, $9 million contract extension. On 3 September, Lindblom returned to play in a Game 6 victory against the New York Islanders. He spent 17:30 minutes on ice, which included three shot attempts, two hits and one block.

On 18 April 2021, the Flyers honored Lindblom at their annual Hockey Fights Cancer game, his first since returning to play post-cancer diagnosis and treatment. After the regular season Lindblom was announced as a finalist for the Masterton Trophy for the second consecutive year, and on 15 June, he was named as winner of the trophy.

Following the 2021–22 season, in a move that was panned by both reporters and fans, the Flyers bought out the remainder of Lindblom's contract with one year remaining.

=== San Jose Sharks ===
On 13 July 2022, Lindblom signed as a free agent to a two-year, $5 million contract with the San Jose Sharks.

=== Return to Sweden ===
At the conclusion of his contract with the Sharks and having spent the final season of his contract in the AHL, Lindblom opted to return to his original Swedish club, Brynäs IF, for their return to the SHL. He was signed to a two-year contract with an additional multi-year option on 8 May 2024.

== International play ==
Medal record

Men's ice hockey

Representing Sweden

World U-17 Hockey Challenge
Gold medal – first place	2013 Drummondville and Victoriaville	

Lindblom competed as a member of Team Sweden at the 2013 World U-17 Hockey Challenge, where he led Sweden to a Gold Medal as the tournament's leading scorer.

On 9 May 2019, Lindblom was named to make his senior international debut with Sweden at the 2019 World Championships held in Bratislava, Slovakia.

== Personal life ==
Lindblom's older brother Marcus plays for Strömsbro IF of Hockeyettan. Their younger brother Linus plays in the Brynäs IF system.

== Career statistics ==
=== Regular season and playoffs ===
			Regular season					Playoffs
Season	Team	League	GP	G	A	Pts	PIM	GP	G	A	Pts	PIM
2011–12	Brynäs IF	J18	13	6	7	13	0	—	—	—	—	—
2011–12	Brynäs IF	J18 Allsv	17	6	7	13	8	1	0	1	1	0
2012–13	Brynäs IF	J18	22	20	21	41	4	—	—	—	—	—
2012–13	Brynäs IF	J18 Allsv	11	11	7	18	10	8	4	5	9	2
2012–13	Brynäs IF	J20	3	1	0	1	0	—	—	—	—	—
2013–14	Brynäs IF	J18	4	5	4	9	0	—	—	—	—	—
2013–14	Brynäs IF	J18 Allsv	2	3	1	4	0	—	—	—	—	—
2013–14	Brynäs IF	J20	43	13	20	33	28	7	6	1	7	6
2013–14	Brynäs IF	SHL	4	0	0	0	0	—	—	—	—	—
2014–15	Brynäs IF	SHL	37	8	7	15	16	4	0	0	0	0
2015–16	Brynäs IF	SHL	48	8	17	25	14	3	1	2	3	6
2015–16	Lehigh Valley Phantoms	AHL	8	2	5	7	0	—	—	—	—	—
2016–17	Brynäs IF	SHL	52	22	25	47	18	20	4	10	14	10
2017–18	Lehigh Valley Phantoms	AHL	54	16	18	34	10	11	4	3	7	0
2017–18	Philadelphia Flyers	NHL	23	2	4	6	8	4	0	0	0	0
2018–19	Philadelphia Flyers	NHL	81	17	16	33	20	—	—	—	—	—
2019–20	Philadelphia Flyers	NHL	30	11	7	18	4	2	0	0	0	0
2020–21	Philadelphia Flyers	NHL	50	8	6	14	9	—	—	—	—	—
2021–22	Philadelphia Flyers	NHL	79	12	14	26	22	—	—	—	—	—
2022–23	San Jose Sharks	NHL	73	6	9	15	18	—	—	—	—	—
2023–24	San Jose Sharks	NHL	1	0	0	0	0	—	—	—	—	—
2023–24	San Jose Barracuda	AHL	41	8	8	16	20	—	—	—	—	—
2024–25	Brynäs IF	SHL	52	13	15	28	33	17	7	6	13	4
SHL totals			193	51	64	115	81	47	13	19	32	20
NHL totals			337	56	56	112	81	6	0	0	0	0

=== International ===
Year	Team	Event	Result	GP	G	A	Pts	PIM
2013	Sweden	WHC17	1st place, gold medalist(s)	6	8	5	13	0
2013	Sweden	WJC18	5th	5	2	2	4	0
2013	Sweden	IH18	7th	4	2	2	4	0
2014	Sweden	WJC18	4th	7	3	3	6	2
2015	Sweden	WJC	4th	7	4	5	9	0
2016	Sweden	WJC	4th	7	3	3	6	0
2019	Sweden	WC	5th	8	3	1	4	12
Junior totals				36	22	20	42	2
Senior totals				8	3	1	4	12

== Awards and honours ==
Awards	Year	Ref
NHL
Bill Masterton Memorial Trophy	2020–21	
International
World U-17 Hockey Challenge gold medal	2013	
World U-17 Hockey Challenge scoring leader	2013	
World U-17 Hockey Challenge All-Star Team	2013	
