= Erik Josefsson (ice hockey) =

Swedish ice hockey player

- Born: February 18, 1987 (age 38) Gislaved, Sweden
- Height: 6 ft 0 in (183 cm)
- Weight: 187 lb (85 kg; 13 st 5 lb)
- Position: Centre
- Shot: Left
- Played for: Växjö Lakers
- Playing career: 2008–2023

Erik Josefsson (born February 18, 1987) was a Swedish professional ice hockey player. He played with Växjö Lakers in the Swedish Hockey League (SHL).

== Career statistics ==
| | | | Regular season | | | | | Playoffs |
| Season | Team | League | GP | G | A | Pts | PIM | GP | G | A | Pts | PIM |
|---|---|---|---|---|---|---|---|---|---|---|---|---|
| 2003–04 | Gislaveds SK J18 | J18 Div.1 | — | — | — | — | — | — | — | — | — | — |
| 2003–04 | Gislaveds SK J20 | J20 Div.1 | — | — | — | — | — | — | — | — | — | — |
| 2003–04 | Gislaveds SK | Division 2 | 36 | 11 | 10 | 21 | 14 | — | — | — | — | — |
| 2004–05 | Gislaveds SK J18 | J18 Div.1 | — | — | — | — | — | — | — | — | — | — |
| 2004–05 | Gislaveds SK J20 | J20 Div.1 | — | — | — | — | — | — | — | — | — | — |
| 2004–05 | Gislaveds SK | Division 2 | — | 14 | 4 | 18 | — | — | — | — | — | — |
| 2005–06 | Gislaveds SK | Division 1 | 44 | 5 | 10 | 15 | 46 | — | — | — | — | — |
| 2006–07 | Gislaveds SK | Division 1 | 42 | 13 | 16 | 29 | 46 | — | — | — | — | — |
| 2007–08 | Gislaveds SK | Division 1 | 33 | 12 | 22 | 34 | 44 | — | — | — | — | — |
| 2008–09 | Växjö Lakers HC | HockeyAllsvenskan | 45 | 5 | 4 | 9 | 20 | 10 | 3 | 1 | 4 | 6 |
| 2009–10 | Växjö Lakers HC | HockeyAllsvenskan | 51 | 5 | 12 | 17 | 24 | 10 | 2 | 2 | 4 | 0 |
| 2010–11 | Växjö Lakers HC | HockeyAllsvenskan | 50 | 10 | 17 | 27 | 22 | 10 | 5 | 1 | 6 | 4 |
| 2011–12 | Växjö Lakers HC | Elitserien | 52 | 8 | 2 | 10 | 12 | — | — | — | — | — |
| 2012–13 | Växjö Lakers HC | Elitserien | 55 | 4 | 8 | 12 | 16 | — | — | — | — | — |
| 2013–14 | Växjö Lakers HC | SHL | 55 | 11 | 6 | 17 | 28 | 12 | 2 | 1 | 3 | 4 |
| 2014–15 | Växjö Lakers HC | SHL | 55 | 3 | 4 | 7 | 18 | 18 | 3 | 0 | 3 | 10 |
| 2015–16 | Växjö Lakers HC | SHL | 52 | 6 | 6 | 12 | 12 | 13 | 1 | 3 | 4 | 6 |
| 2016–17 | Växjö Lakers HC | SHL | 49 | 10 | 8 | 18 | 12 | 6 | 1 | 1 | 2 | 4 |
| 2017–18 | Växjö Lakers HC | SHL | 37 | 5 | 5 | 10 | 10 | 13 | 0 | 1 | 1 | 4 |
| 2018–19 | Växjö Lakers HC | SHL | 50 | 3 | 4 | 7 | 20 | 7 | 0 | 0 | 0 | 0 |
| 2019–20 | Växjö Lakers HC | SHL | 47 | 10 | 9 | 19 | 14 | — | — | — | — | — |
| 2020–21 | Växjö Lakers HC | SHL | 52 | 5 | 6 | 11 | 22 | 14 | 0 | 0 | 0 | 2 |
| 2021–22 | Växjö Lakers HC | SHL | 51 | 3 | 7 | 10 | 18 | 4 | 0 | 1 | 1 | 4 |
| 2022–23 | Växjö Lakers HC | SHL | 52 | 5 | 10 | 15 | 24 | 14 | 1 | 3 | 4 | 0 |
| SHL (Elitserien) totals | | | 607 | 73 | 75 | 148 | 206 | 101 | 8 | 10 | 18 | 34 |
| HockeyAllsvenskan totals | | | 146 | 20 | 33 | 53 | 66 | 30 | 10 | 4 | 14 | 10 |
| Division 1 totals | | | 119 | 30 | 48 | 78 | 136 | — | — | — | — | — |

== Awards and honours ==
| Award | Year |
|---|---|
SHL
| Le Mat Trophy (Växjö Lakers) | 2015, 2018, 2021, 2023 |
