= Johan Adolfsson =

Swedish professional ice hockey player

- Born: September 26, 1986 (age 39) Örebro, Sweden
- Height: 185.42 cm (6 ft 1.00 in)
- Weight: 192 lb (87 kg; 13 st 10 lb)
- Position: Right Wing
- Shot: Left
- SHL team Former teams: Free Agent; Örebro HK; Färjestad BK
- Playing career: 2004–2022

Johan Adolfsson (born September 26, 1986) is a Swedish professional ice hockey player. He is currently an unrestricted free agent who most recently was a member of Färjestad BK of the Swedish Hockey League (SHL).

Adolfsson has played the majority of his professional career in the Swedish second tier, Allsvenskan. While under contract with Örebro HK, Adolfsson began the 2016–17 season with HC Vita Hästen before he was recalled to the SHL with Örebro HK on his 30th birthday.

== Career statistics ==
			Regular season					Playoffs
Season	Team	League	GP	G	A	Pts	PIM	GP	G	A	Pts	PIM
2003–04	HC Örebro J20	J20 Elit	—	—	—	—	—	—	—	—	—	—
2003–04	HC Örebro 90	Allsvenskan	1	0	0	0	0	—	—	—	—	—
2004–05	HC Örebro J20	J20 Elit	—	18	19	37	—	—	—	—	—	—
2004–05	HC Örebro 90	Division 1	—	14	14	28	—	8	5	1	6	4
2005–06	HC Örebro J20	J20 Elit	—	15	13	28	—	1	0	0	0	2
2005–06	Örebro HK	Division 1	31	5	5	10	38	5	0	1	1	2
2006–07	HC Örebro J20	J20 Elit	1	0	1	1	—	—	—	—	—	—
2006–07	Örebro HK	Division 1	42	18	21	39	59	2	0	0	0	2
2007–08	AIK IF	HockeyAllsvenskan	45	9	9	18	57	—	—	—	—	—
2008–09	AIK IF	HockeyAllsvenskan	44	5	7	12	42	10	0	1	1	26
2009–10	Örebro HK	HockeyAllsvenskan	51	5	5	10	69	—	—	—	—	—
2010–11	Örebro HK	HockeyAllsvenskan	49	9	14	23	48	10	2	1	3	6
2011–12	Örebro HK	HockeyAllsvenskan	41	4	5	9	18	10	0	0	0	4
2012–13	Örebro HK	HockeyAllsvenskan	14	2	2	4	16	9	0	0	0	0
2014–15	Örebro HK	SHL	45	5	5	10	8	5	1	1	2	4
2015–16	Örebro HK	SHL	19	0	4	4	6	—	—	—	—	—
2015–16	HC Vita Hästen	HockeyAllsvenskan	6	3	2	5	8	—	—	—	—	—
2016–17	Örebro HK	SHL	37	0	3	3	12	—	—	—	—	—
2016–17	HC Vita Hästen	HockeyAllsvenskan	3	0	0	0	0	—	—	—	—	—
2017–18	HC Vita Hästen	HockeyAllsvenskan	14	1	2	3	8	—	—	—	—	—
2017–18	Färjestad BK	SHL	6	0	0	0	4	—	—	—	—	—
2021–22	Brödernas Hockey	Division 4	2	2	3	5	0	2	0	5	5	2
SHL totals			107	5	12	17	30	5	1	1	2	4
HockeyAllsvenskan totals			267	38	46	84	266	39	2	2	4	36
