= Axel Holmström (ice hockey) =

Swedish ice hockey player (born 1996)

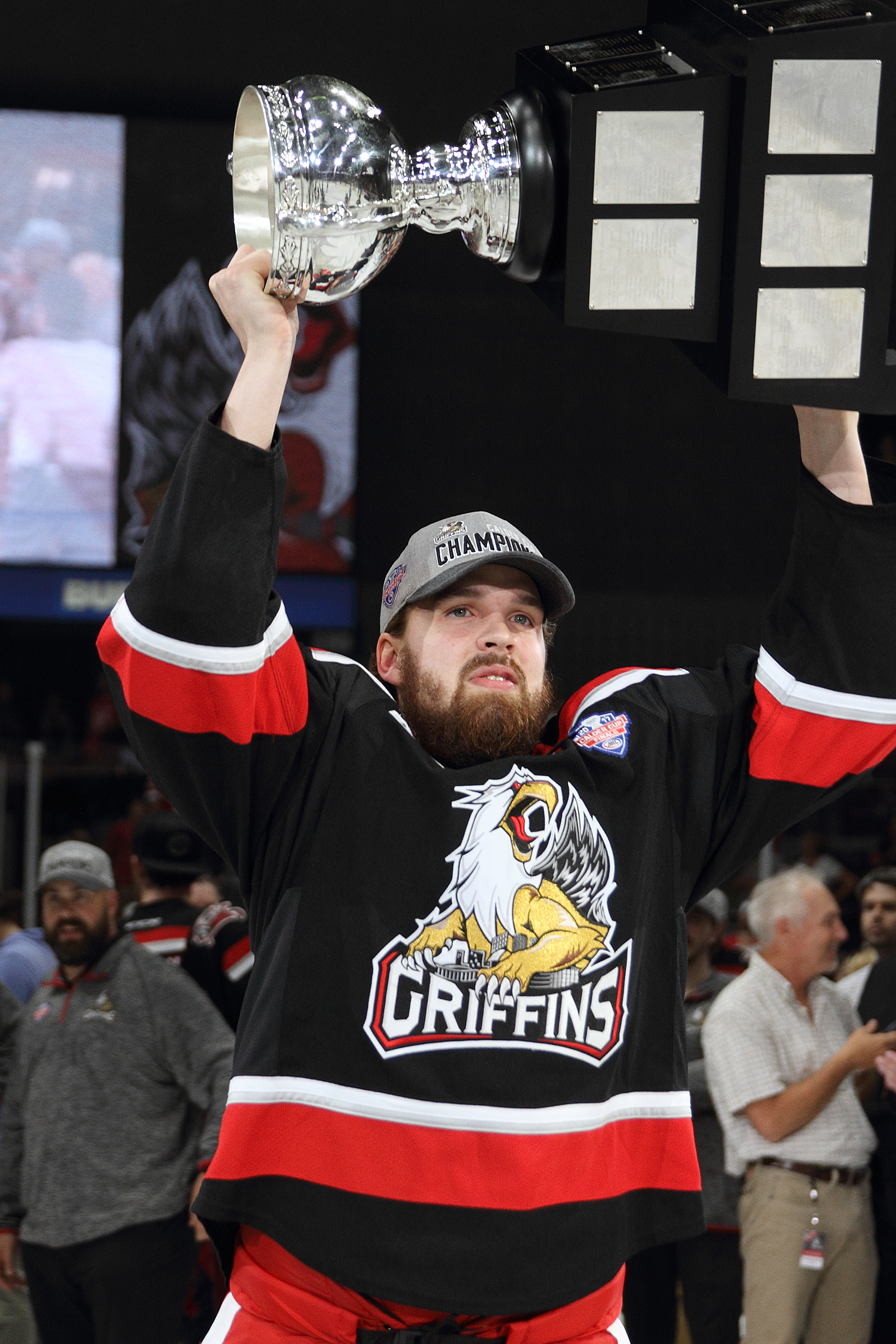
- Born: June 29, 1996 (age 30) Arvidsjaur, Sweden
- Height: 6 ft 0 in (183 cm)
- Weight: 198 lb (90 kg; 14 st 2 lb)
- Position: Centre
- Shoots: Left
- Liiga team Former teams: Vaasan Sport; Skellefteå AIK; Grand Rapids Griffins; HV71; SC Langnau Tigers
- NHL draft: 196th overall, 2014; Detroit Red Wings
- Playing career: 2013–present

Axel Holmström (born June 29, 1996) is a Swedish professional ice hockey forward, currently playing for Vaasan Sport of the Finnish Liiga. Holmström was drafted 196th overall by the Detroit Red Wings in the 2014 NHL entry draft.

== Playing career ==
=== Junior ===
During the 2013–14 season, Holmström recorded 15 goals and 23 assists in 33 games with Skellefteå AIK's J20 SuperElit team, as well as skating in four games for Skellefteå AIK. Holmström was ranked 90th by the NHL Central Scouting Bureau on their final list of the top draft-eligible European skaters leading into the 2014 NHL entry draft.

=== Professional ===
During the 2014–15 season, Holmström recorded ten goals and ten assists in 44 games during the regular season. He was tied for second overall in the SHL among junior-aged players in scoring. Holmström helped Skellefteå AIK reach the SHL Finals, and led the league in postseason scoring with seven goals and 11 assists in 15 games, breaking the league record for playoff points by a junior player, previously held by Daniel and Henrik Sedin. On June 15, 2015, the Detroit Red Wings signed Holmström to a three-year entry-level contract.

During the 2016–17 season, Holmström recorded one goal and one assist in 16 games, while being limited by injury during the regular season. He recorded three goals and four assists in seven playoff games to lead his team in playoff scoring. On April 3, 2017, Holmström was reassigned to the Grand Rapids Griffins. During the 2018–19 season, Holmström recorded 12 goals and 13 assists in 65 games for the Griffins.

On April 30, 2019, Holmström returned to Sweden and signed a two-year contract with HV71 of the Swedish Hockey League (SHL).

== International play ==
Holmström represented Sweden at the 2013 Ivan Hlinka Memorial Tournament, where he recorded one assist in four games. He later represented Sweden at the 2014 IIHF World U18 Championships, where he was second-leading scorer during the tournament, recording three goals and eight assists in seven games. Holmström represented Sweden at the 2015 World Junior Ice Hockey Championships, where he recorded one goal and six assists in seven games. Holmström again represented Sweden at the 2016 World Junior Ice Hockey Championships, where he recorded one goal and five assists in seven games.

== Career statistics ==
=== Regular season and playoffs ===
			Regular season					Playoffs
Season	Team	League	GP	G	A	Pts	PIM	GP	G	A	Pts	PIM
2012–13	Skellefteå AIK	J20	10	2	1	3	0	4	0	1	1	0
2013–14	Skellefteå AIK	J20	33	15	23	38	12	2	0	0	0	0
2013–14	Skellefteå AIK	SHL	4	0	0	0	0	—	—	—	—	—
2014–15	Skellefteå AIK	J20	3	0	4	4	0	—	—	—	—	—
2014–15	Skellefteå AIK	SHL	44	10	10	20	4	15	7	11	18	0
2015–16	Skellefteå AIK	SHL	48	8	15	23	20	10	2	4	6	2
2016–17	Skellefteå AIK	SHL	16	1	1	2	0	7	3	4	7	0
2016–17	Grand Rapids Griffins	AHL	7	1	1	2	2	4	1	0	1	0
2017–18	Grand Rapids Griffins	AHL	66	7	19	26	4	2	0	1	1	0
2018–19	Grand Rapids Griffins	AHL	65	12	13	25	6	—	—	—	—	—
2019–20	HV71	SHL	46	8	12	20	6	—	—	—	—	—
2020–21	HV71	SHL	42	5	8	13	12	—	—	—	—	—
2021–22	Vaasan Sport	Liiga	59	7	14	21	10	—	—	—	—	—
2022–23	Vaasan Sport	Liiga	49	13	27	40	16	—	—	—	—	—
2022–23	SC Langnau Tigers	NL	7	1	0	1	0	—	—	—	—	—
2023–24	Vaasan Sport	Liiga	53	20	17	37	22	2	1	1	2	0
SHL totals			200	32	46	78	42	32	12	19	31	2
Liiga totals			161	40	58	98	48	2	1	1	2	0

=== International ===
Year	Team	Event	Result	GP	G	A	Pts	PIM
2013	Sweden	IH18	7th	4	0	1	1	2
2014	Sweden	U18	4th	7	3	8	11	4
2015	Sweden	WJC	4th	7	1	6	7	0
2016	Sweden	WJC	4th	7	1	5	6	2
Junior totals				25	5	20	25	8

== Awards and honours ==
Award	Year
AHL
Calder Cup (Grand Rapids Griffins)	2017
