= Patrik Zackrisson =

Swedish ice hockey player (born 1987)

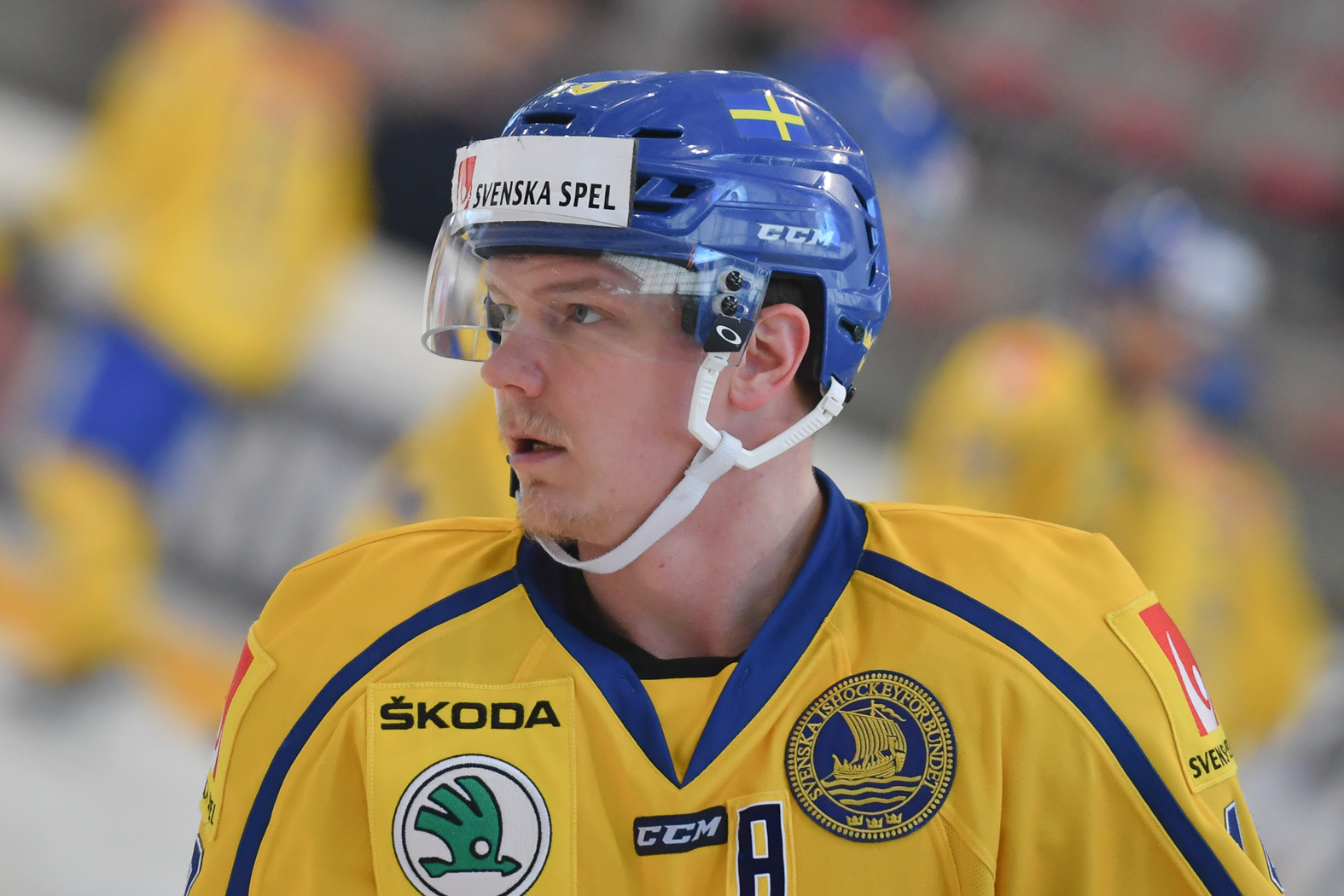
- Born: March 27, 1987 (age 39) Ekerö, Sweden
- Height: 5 ft 11 in (180 cm)
- Weight: 187 lb (85 kg; 13 st 5 lb)
- Position: Centre
- Shoots: Right
- SHL team Former teams: Free agent Frölunda HC; Linköpings HC; Atlant Moscow Oblast; HC Lev Praha; Skellefteå AIK; HC Lugano; Sibir Novosibirsk; Dynamo Moscow; Leksands IF
- National team: Sweden
- NHL draft: 165th overall, 2007; San Jose Sharks
- Playing career: 2005–present

Patrik Zackrisson (born March 27, 1987) is a professional Swedish ice hockey centre who is currently an unrestricted free agent. He most recently played for Leksands IF of the Swedish Hockey League (SHL).

== Playing career ==
Zackrisson spent his junior career with Frölunda HC before moving to play one season with Rögle BK in the HockeyAllsvenskan, and then signing with Linköpings HC, where he spent four seasons. Zackrisson was drafted 165th overall in the 2007 NHL entry draft by the San Jose Sharks.

Zackrisson scored his first goal in Elitserien on 27 September 2007 against Luleå HF. In the 2008 Swedish Championship finals against HV71 he was noted for three goals and one assist, his only points in the playoffs. In February 2009, Zackrisson signed a two-year contract with Linköping solidifying a place in the team until 2011. In 2011 Zackrisson signed a two-year contract with KHL club Atlant Moscow Oblast.

On August 20, 2013, Zackrisson signed for HC Lev Praha. After one season with Lev Praha, Zackrisson returned to Sweden and signed with Skellefteå AIK. In his two years at Skellefteå, the team reached the SHL finals twice, but did not clinch the title. In May 2016, he signed a deal with HC Lugano of the Swiss top-flight National League A (NLA).

In returning to the KHL for the 2017–18 season, Zackrisson made a quick transition to HC Sibir Novosibirsk, securing a top-line role in leading the club in scoring with 42 points in 56 games. He left as a free agent to sign a lucrative two-year contract with HC Dynamo Moscow on May 2, 2018.

After three seasons abroad, Zackrisson return home to Sweden, agreeing to a four-year contract with newly promoted Leksands IF of the SHL on 5 July 2019.

== Career statistics ==
=== Regular season and playoffs ===
			Regular season					Playoffs
Season	Team	League	GP	G	A	Pts	PIM	GP	G	A	Pts	PIM
2002–03	Skå IK	Div.1	17	3	6	9	4	6	1	2	3	0
2003–04	Västra Frölunda HC	J18 Allsv	14	5	9	14	4	7	2	3	5	0
2003–04	Västra Frölunda HC	J20	2	0	1	1	0	—	—	—	—	—
2004–05	Frölunda HC	J18 Allsv	2	2	1	3	29	6	3	3	6	4
2004–05	Frölunda HC	J20	32	16	9	25	22	6	1	2	3	0
2005–06	Frölunda HC	J20	39	26	19	45	34	7	4	5	9	4
2005–06	Frölunda HC	SEL	10	0	1	1	0	—	—	—	—	—
2006–07	Rögle BK	Allsv	29	16	18	34	28	9	1	5	6	4
2007–08	Linköpings HC	SEL	55	4	9	13	35	16	3	1	4	12
2008–09	Linköpings HC	SEL	54	15	19	34	12	7	1	3	4	2
2009–10	Linköpings HC	SEL	45	16	16	32	20	—	—	—	—	—
2010–11	Linköpings HC	SEL	55	16	15	30	8	7	4	3	7	0
2011–12	Atlant Moscow Oblast	KHL	54	8	14	22	36	12	2	5	7	8
2012–13	Linköpings HC	SEL	25	4	9	13	10	10	2	4	6	6
2013–14	HC Lev Praha	KHL	54	7	10	17	20	22	4	7	11	4
2014–15	Skellefteå AIK	SHL	52	10	25	35	20	15	4	9	13	4
2015–16	Skellefteå AIK	SHL	52	15	33	48	68	16	2	8	10	6
2016–17	HC Lugano	NLA	35	5	14	19	14	9	1	5	6	8
2017–18	Sibir Novosibirsk	KHL	56	13	29	42	18	—	—	—	—	—
2018–19	Dynamo Moscow	KHL	38	5	6	11	6	11	3	6	9	2
2019–20	Leksands IF	SHL	51	7	14	21	45	—	—	—	—	—
2020–21	Leksands IF	SHL	44	8	21	29	57	4	1	1	2	2
2021–22	Leksands IF	SHL	42	11	25	36	8	2	0	0	0	0
2022–23	Leksands IF	SHL	49	5	14	19	4	3	1	0	1	0
2023–24	Leksands IF	SHL	46	3	10	13	4	6	0	3	3	0
2024–25	Leksands IF	SHL	46	6	15	21	16	—	—	—	—	—
SHL totals			626	120	226	346	307	86	18	32	50	32
KHL totals			202	33	59	92	80	45	9	18	27	14

Medal record

Representing Sweden

Ice hockey

World U18 Championship
Bronze medal – third place	2005 Plzeň	

=== International ===
Year	Team	Event	Result	GP	G	A	Pts	PIM
2005	Sweden	WJC18	3rd place, bronze medalist(s)	7	2	3	5	0
2007	Sweden	WJC	4th	7	1	1	2	12
2018	Sweden	OG	5th	4	1	2	3	0
Junior totals				14	3	4	7	12
Senior totals				4	1	2	3	0
