= Johan Markusson =

Swedish ice hockey player

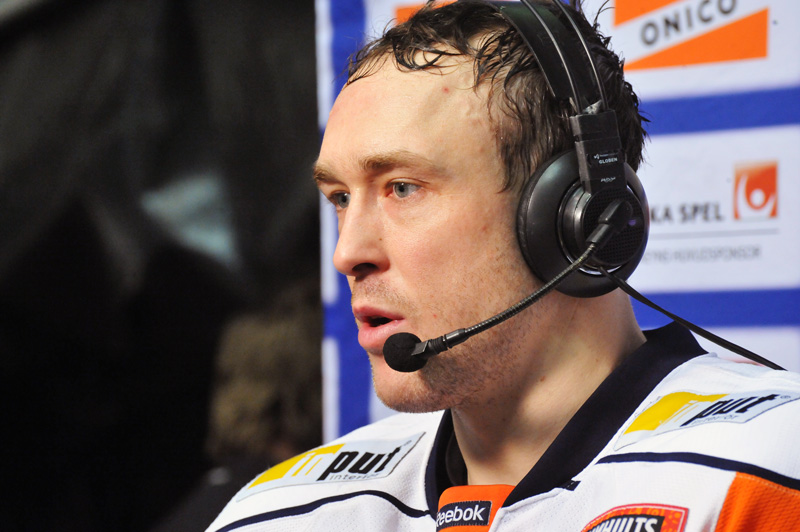
- Born: August 20, 1979 (age 46) Gävle, Sweden
- Height: 5 ft 11 in (180 cm)
- Weight: 209 lb (95 kg; 14 st 13 lb)
- Position: Right wing
- Shot: Right
- Played for: Brynäs IF; Växjö Lakers
- Playing career: 1998–2014

Johan Markusson (born August 20, 1979) is a Swedish former professional ice hockey player. He played in the top tier Swedish Hockey League (SHL) with Brynäs IF and the Växjö Lakers. He spent the most notable time in his career with the Lakers, playing in 9 seasons with the club, leading the club as Captain through their promotion of the HockeyAllsvenskan to the SHL.
