= Markus Svensson =

Swedish ice hockey player (born 1984)

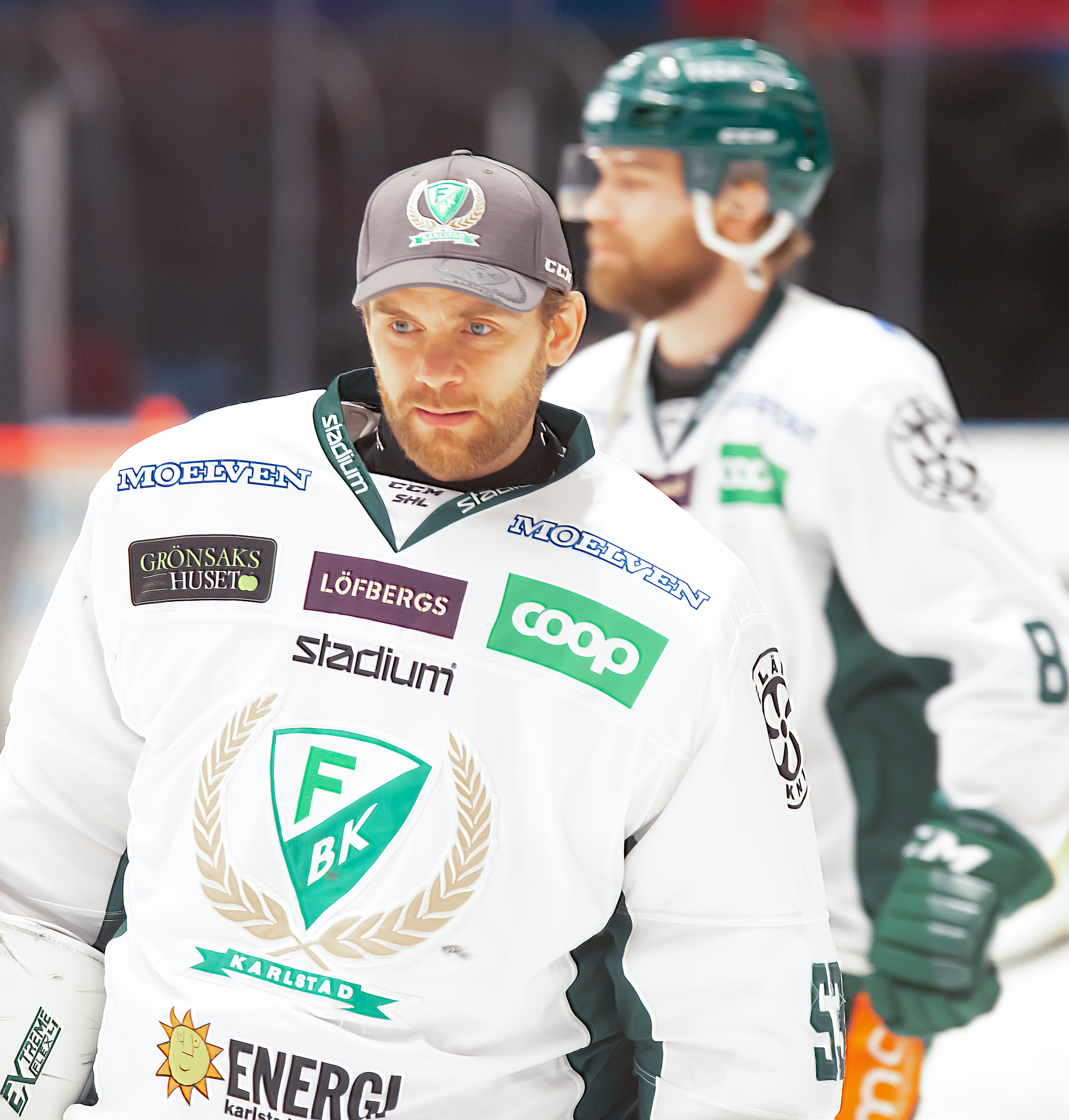
- Born: July 9, 1984 (age 41) Kalmar, Sweden
- Height: 6 ft 1 in (185 cm)
- Weight: 196 lb (89 kg; 14 st 0 lb)
- Position: Goaltender
- Catches: Left
- SHL team Former teams: Free Agent; AIK; Skellefteå AIK; HC Spartak Moscow; Färjestad BK
- NHL draft: Undrafted
- Playing career: 2011–present

Markus "Mackan" Svensson (born July 9, 1984) is a Swedish professional ice hockey goaltender, currently an unrestricted free agent. He was most recently under contract with Färjestad BK of the Swedish Hockey League (SHL).

== Playing career ==
Svensson started his career in the youth ranks of Kalmar HC and moved to IK Oskarshamn in 2001, where he stayed for three years and made his debut in the HockeyAllsvenskan.

After a two-year stint at Mariestad BoIS (2004 -2006), he returned to Oskarshamn and became a regular on the club’s HockeyAllsvenskan squad, before transferring to the Malmö Redhawks in 2008.

After signing with AIK IF in 2011, he logged his first minutes in Sweden’s top-flight SHL and was temporarily loaned to IK Oskarshamn of the Swedish HockeyAllsvenskan (Swe-1) during the 2011–12 season. He was snapped up by the SHL side Skellefteå AIK in 2012. Svensson contributed to winning the 2013 and 2014 Swedish national championships and also reached the finals with Skellefteå in 2015 and 2016. In the 2015–16 season, he was the recipient of the Honken Trophy, given to the SHL Goaltender of the Year.

He left Skellefteå after four years, signing with Spartak Moscow of the Kontinental Hockey League (KHL) in May 2016. After two seasons with Spartak, Svensson returned to Sweden, agreeing a two-year deal with Färjestad BK of the SHL on May 2, 2018.

== International play ==
Svensson made his debut with the Swedish national team in February 2015 and landed a spot on Sweden's roster for the World Championship the same year.
