= Alexander Hamberg =

Swedish ice hockey player

- Born: August 4, 1985 (age 40) Sweden
- Height: 6 ft 2 in (188 cm)
- Weight: 196 lb (89 kg; 14 st 0 lb)
- Position: Goaltender
- Catches: Left
- Elitserien team: AIK IF
- NHL draft: Undrafted
- Playing career: 2004–present

Alexander Hamberg (born August 4, 1985) is a Swedish former ice hockey goaltender. He made his Elitserien debut playing with AIK IF during the 2012–13 Elitserien season. He is currently assigned as goaltender coach for Väsby IK HK.
