= Broc Little =

American ice hockey player

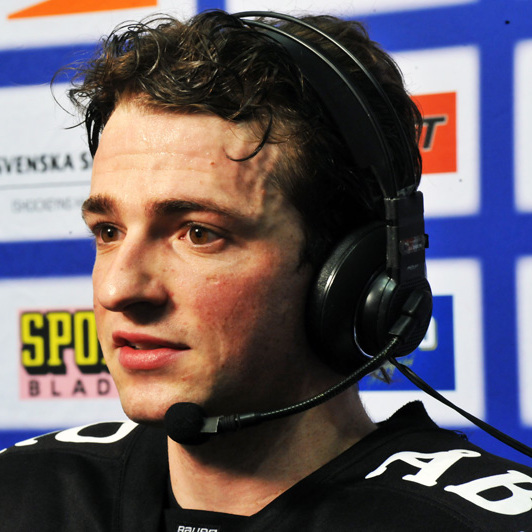
- Little with AIK in 2013
- Born: March 24, 1988 (age 37); Phoenix, Arizona, U.S.
- Height: 5 ft 9 in (175 cm)
- Weight: 170 lb (77 kg; 12 st 2 lb)
- Position: Forward
- Shoots: Left
- SHL team Former teams: Linköping HC; AIK; Jokerit; HC Davos
- National team: United States
- NHL draft: Undrafted
- Playing career: 2011–present

Broc Little (born March 24, 1988) is an American professional ice hockey forward currently playing for Linköping HC of the Swedish Hockey League (SHL).

== Playing career ==
Little is a graduate of Cushing Academy in Ashburnham, in his freshman year at Cushing he played with the team's leading point scorer - future NHL defenseman Keith Yandle. Prior to turning professional, Little attended Yale University, where he played four seasons with the Yale Bulldogs men's ice hockey team which competes in NCAA's Division I in the ECAC Hockey conference. In his 3rd year (2009–10) Little was named to the All-ECAC Hockey First-Team.

Little spent the first two professional seasons of his career in Sweden with VIK Västerås HK of the Second Tier Allsvenskan and AIK of the Elitserien (SEL). In both seasons, Little led his club in scoring with 66 points in 51 games for Västerås and 46 in 55 games for AIK. He led the Allsvenskan for highest points total in 2012 and placed fifth in the Elitserien in 2013.

On July 26, 2013, Little returned to North America as a free agent to sign a one-year AHL contract with the Springfield Falcons, an affiliate of the Columbus Blue Jackets. In the 2013–14 season after only 20 games with the Falcons, Little was released from his contract on January 16, 2014. On January 17, 2014, Little signed a Professional Tryout with the Iowa Wild of the AHL. After a solitary game with the Wild, Little opted to resume his European career in signing for the remainder of the season with Finnish Liiga club, Jokerit on January 20, 2014.

With Jokerit bound for the Kontinental Hockey League, Little left the team as a free agent and returned to the SHL in signing a contract with Linköpings HC on April 16, 2014. He was the league's leading goal scorer in the 2014–15 season (28). Little left Linköping at the conclusion of the 2016–17 season and moved to HC Davos of the National League (NL).

== Career statistics ==
=== Regular season and playoffs ===
			Regular season					Playoffs
Season	Team	League	GP	G	A	Pts	PIM	GP	G	A	Pts	PIM
2004–05	Cushing Academy	HS-Prep	34	5	8	13		—	—	—	—	—
2005–06	Cushing Academy	HS-Prep	33	35	21	56	12	—	—	—	—	—
2006–07	Cushing Academy	HS-Prep	32	44	29	73	24	—	—	—	—	—
2007–08	Yale University	ECAC	27	11	12	23	10	—	—	—	—	—
2008–09	Yale University	ECAC	34	15	20	35	22	—	—	—	—	—
2009–10	Yale University	ECAC	34	27	14	41	36	—	—	—	—	—
2010–11	Yale University	ECAC	36	19	24	43	26	—	—	—	—	—
2011–12	VIK Västerås HK	Allsv	51	35	31	66	28	6	1	1	2	6
2012–13	AIK	SEL	55	16	30	46	24	—	—	—	—	—
2013–14	Springfield Falcons	AHL	20	3	5	8	8	—	—	—	—	—
2013–14	Iowa Wild	AHL	1	0	0	0	0	—	—	—	—	—
2013–14	Jokerit	Liiga	15	2	3	5	4	1	0	0	0	0
2014–15	Linköpings HC	SHL	55	28	19	47	38	11	5	9	14	8
2015–16	Linköpings HC	SHL	43	21	14	35	24	6	2	2	4	0
2016–17	Linköpings HC	SHL	52	19	34	53	16	6	1	0	1	4
2017–18	HC Davos	NL	48	21	15	36	4	5	1	2	3	0
2018–19	Linköpings HC	SHL	33	17	12	29	22	—	—	—	—	—
2019–20	Linköping HC	SHL	48	24	21	45	14	—	—	—	—	—
2020–21	Linköping HC	SHL	31	11	16	27	12	—	—	—	—	—
2021–22	Linköping HC	SHL	51	15	14	29	40	—	—	—	—	—
2022–23	Linköping HC	SHL	27	13	6	19	10	—	—	—	—	—
2023–24	Linköping HC	SHL	52	17	24	41	8	4	2	1	3	0
2024–25	Linköping HC	SHL	38	5	12	17	12	—	—	—	—	—
SHL totals			485	186	202	388	220	27	10	12	22	12
Liiga totals			15	2	3	5	4	1	0	0	0	0
NL totals			48	21	15	36	4	5	1	2	3	0

=== International ===
Year	Team	Event	Result	GP	G	A	Pts	PIM
2018	United States	OG	7th	5	0	1	1	0
Senior totals				5	0	1	1	0

== Awards and honors ==
Award	Year
Collegiate
All-ECAC Hockey Third Team	2008–09
ECAC All-Tournament Team	2009
All-ECAC First Team	2009–10
AHCA East Second - Team All-American	2009–10
Allsv
Most goals	2012
SHL
Håkan Loob Trophy - Most goals in the SHL (Linköping HC)	2015, 2020
