= 2014–15 SHL season =

- League: Swedish Hockey League
- Sport: Ice hockey
- Duration: 10 September 2014 – 23 April 2015
- Number of games: 55 (330 total)
- Number of teams: 12
- Total attendance: 1,987,961
- Average attendance: 6,024

Regular season
- League champion: Skellefteå AIK
- Season MVP: Július Hudáček (Örebro HK)
- Top scorer: Derek Ryan (Örebro HK)

Playoffs
- Playoffs MVP: Noah Welch (Växjö Lakers)

Finals
- Champions: Växjö Lakers
- Runners-up: Skellefteå AIK

SHL seasons
- ← 2013–14 2015–16 →

The 2014–15 SHL season was the 40th season of the Swedish Hockey League (SHL). The regular season began on 10 September 2014 and ended on 5 March 2015. The following playoffs began on 12 March and ended on 23 April 2015.

Skellefteå AIK won the regular season for the third consecutive season. Växjö Lakers won the Swedish Championship title by defeating Skellefteå in six games in a series where none of the two teams won at home until Växjö in game six. The title was Växjö's first in only their second play-off appearance.

Modo Hockey and Leksands IF were forced to play in the Direktkval till SHL to defend their SHL status. Modo swept the series against HC Vita Hästen while Leksand lost to Malmö Redhawks over seven games. Therefore Malmö were promoted to the SHL on the expense of Leksand.

== Pre-season ==
On 29 April 2014, the Swedish Sports Confederation (RF) informed that Modo Hockey player Edwin Hedberg had tested positive for the banned substance sibutramine in February. Hedberg voluntarily suspended himself for the duration of the investigation. On 9 July 2014, the RF handed Hedberg a six-month suspension from all organised sporting activity; the suspension ended on 24 October 2014.

On 7 July 2014, the RF suspended Luleå HF goaltender Mark Owuya from all sporting activity for one year. The verdict came due to an incident in February, in which Owuya disappeared without supervision during out-of-competition testing for doping. Owuya would have missed the entire 2014–15 season as a result, but appealed the decision to the top instance of the RF on 28 July 2014. On 4 September 2014, the instance decided to lift the suspension.

== Regular season ==
=== Standings ===
Final standings
Team	Pld	W	OTW	OTL	L	GF	GA	GD	Pts	Qualification
Skellefteå AIK	55	32	5	5	13	169	116	+53	111	Advanced directly to the playoffs
Frölunda HC	55	23	11	6	15	145	120	+25	97	Advanced directly to the playoffs
Växjö Lakers	55	24	9	6	16	158	120	+38	96	Advanced directly to the playoffs
Linköpings HC	55	26	4	7	18	156	125	+31	93	Advanced directly to the playoffs
HV71	55	25	6	5	19	145	141	+4	92	Advanced directly to the playoffs
Örebro HK	55	21	10	7	17	156	128	+28	90	Advanced directly to the playoffs
Färjestad BK	55	21	6	8	20	128	135	−7	83	Play-in for the playoffs
Luleå HF	55	21	6	4	24	127	131	−4	79	Play-in for the playoffs
Djurgårdens IF	55	15	9	8	23	128	157	−29	71	Play-in for the playoffs
Brynäs IF	55	19	3	5	28	132	159	−27	68	Play-in for the playoffs
Leksands IF	55	15	3	6	31	116	179	−63	57	Relegation series
Modo Hockey	55	12	4	9	30	127	176	−49	53	Relegation series

=== Statistics ===
==== Scoring leaders ====
List shows the ten best skaters based on the number of points during the regular season. If two or more skaters are tied (i.e. same number of points, goals and played games), all of the tied skaters are shown.

As of 5 March 2015

GP = Games played; G = Goals; A = Assists; Pts = Points; +/– = Plus/minus; PIM = Penalty minutes

Player	Team	GP	G	A	Pts	+/–	PIM
(United States) Derek Ryan	Örebro HK	55	15	45	60	+18	18
(United States) Jeff Taffe	Linköpings HC	54	18	41	59	+12	43
(United States) Broc Little	Linköpings HC	55	28	19	47	+14	38
(Canada) Jacob Micflikier	Linköpings HC	54	24	23	47	+13	26
(Sweden) Martin Johansson	Örebro HK	54	24	22	46	+18	10
(Norway) Mathis Olimb	Frölunda HC	51	7	39	46	+19	65
(Sweden) Robert Rosén	Växjö Lakers	53	23	21	44	+27	16
(Canada) Erik Christensen	HV71	46	13	31	44	+7	14
(Canada) Greg Scott	Brynäs IF	47	18	24	42	+4	20
(United States) Bill Sweatt	Brynäs IF	54	19	22	41	+3	36

==== Leading goaltenders ====
These are the leaders in GAA among goaltenders who played at least 40% of the team's minutes. The table is sorted by GAA, and the criteria for inclusion are bolded.

As of 5 March 2015

GP = Games played; TOI = Time on ice (minutes); GA = Goals against; SO = Shutouts; Sv% = Save percentage; GAA = Goals against average

Player	Team	GP	TOI	GA	SO	Sv%	GAA
(Sweden) Joel Lassinantti	Luleå HF	38	2071:48	65	5	92.79	1.88
(Slovakia) Julius Hudacek	Örebro HK	45	2640:54	84	4	92.99	1.91
(Sweden) Markus Svensson	Skellefteå AIK	30	1789:47	57	3	91.88	1.91
(Sweden) Cristopher Nilstorp	Växjö Lakers	38	2134:52	70	5	91.28	1.97
(Sweden) Linus Fernström	Frölunda HC	33	1851:50	61	4	90.63	1.98
(Canada) Justin Pogge	Färjestad BK	30	1642:59	55	4	92.60	2.01
(Sweden) Lars Johansson	Frölunda HC	30	1492:46	50	3	91.50	2.01
(Sweden) David Rautio	Linköpings HC	33	1851:07	63	7	92.13	2.04
(Sweden) Erik Hanses	Skellefteå AIK	25	1415:06	48	2	91.50	2.04
(Sweden) Marcus Högberg	Linköpings HC	27	1462:55	56	3	91.72	2.30

== Playoffs ==
The top six teams will qualify directly for the playoffs, while the four teams ranked 7–10 will play a best-of-three series and battle for the two remaining playoff spots.

=== Play-in ===
The teams ranked 7 and 10, and the teams ranked 8 and 9, respectively, will face each other in a best-of-three series in order to qualify for the playoffs. The better-ranked teams in the two series will receive home advantage, i.e. two home games, if necessary. The two winners will take the two remaining playoff spots.

==== (7) Färjestad BK vs. (10) Brynäs IF ====
7 March	Färjestad BK	3–4	**OT**	**Brynäs IF**	Löfbergs Arena	Recap
Joachim Rohdin 1 - 03:00; Linus Persson 1 - pp - 05:09		First period		03:34 - Daniel Brodin 1; 06:24 - Jonas Nordquist 1
No scoring		Second period		05:48 - Anton Rödin 1
Linus Persson 2 - 14:09		Third period		No scoring
No scoring		First overtime period		01:14 - Adam Brodecki 1
Justin Pogge ( 19 saves / 23 shots )		Goalie stats		Bernhard Starkbaum ( 36 saves / 39 shots )

9 March	Brynäs IF	2–3	**OT**	**Färjestad BK**	Gavlerinken Arena	Recap
Oskar Lindblom 1 - pp - 18:35		First period		04:29 - Linus Persson 3
No scoring		Second period		05:26 - pp - Tero Koskiranta 1
Bill Sweatt 1 - 18:48		Third period		No scoring
No scoring		First overtime period		06:12 - Anssi Salmela 1
Bernhard Starkbaum ( 30 saves / 33 shots )		Goalie stats		Fredrik Pettersson-Wentzel ( 31 saves / 33 shots )

10 March	Färjestad BK	**1–2**	**Brynäs IF**	Löfbergs Arena	Recap
No scoring		**First period**	No scoring
Joakim Nygård 1 - 09:02		**Second period**	No scoring
No scoring		**Third period**	08:55 - Bill Sweatt 2; 18:41 - Tomáš Slovák 1
Fredrik Pettersson-Wentzel ( 29 saves / 31 shots )		**Goalie stats**	Bernhard Starkbaum ( 31 saves / 32 shots )

**Brynäs IF won series 2–1**

==== (8) Luleå HF vs. (9) Djurgårdens IF ====
7 March	**Luleå HF**	**1–0**	Djurgårdens IF	Coop Norrbotten Arena	Recap
Emil Sylvegård 1 - 03:46		**First period**	No scoring
No scoring		**Second period**	No scoring
No scoring		**Third period**	No scoring
Joel Lassinantti ( 14 saves / 14 shots )		**Goalie stats**	Mikael Tellqvist ( 24 saves / 25 shots )

9 March	Djurgårdens IF	**1–3**	**Luleå HF**	Hovet	Recap
No scoring		**First period**	02:10 - Karl Fabricius 1; 02:54 - Johan Harju 1
Marcus Sörensen 1 - 13:41		**Second period**	No scoring
No scoring		**Third period**	18:29 - Johan Forsberg 1
Mikael Tellqvist ( 32 saves / 35 shots )		**Goalie stats**	Joel Lassinantti ( 14 saves / 15 shots )

**Luleå HF won series 2–0**

=== Playoff bracket ===
In the first round, the top-ranked team will face the lowest-ranked winner of the two best-of-three series, the 2nd-ranked team will face the other winner of the two best-of-three series, the 3rd-ranked team will face the 6th-ranked team, and the 4th-ranked team will face the 5th-ranked team. In the second round, the highest remaining seed is matched against the lowest remaining seed. In each round the higher-seeded team is awarded home advantage. Each series is a best-of-seven series that follows an alternating home team format: the higher-seeded team will play at home for games 1 and 3 (plus 5 and 7 if necessary), and the lower-seeded team will be at home for game 2 and 4 (plus 6 if necessary).

Quarterfinals
1	**Skellefteå AIK**	**4**
10	Brynäs IF	0
2	**Frölunda HC**	**4**
8	Luleå HF	3
(Pairings are reseeded after the first round)
3	**Växjö Lakers**	**4**
6	Örebro HK	2
4	**Linköpings HC**	**4**
5	HV71	2

Semifinals
1	**Skellefteå AIK**	**4**
4	Linköpings HC	1
2	Frölunda HC	2
3	**Växjö Lakers**	**4**

Finals
1	Skellefteå AIK	2
3	**Växjö Lakers**	4

=== Quarterfinals ===
==== (1) Skellefteå AIK vs. (10) Brynäs IF ====
12 March	**Skellefteå AIK**	**4–1**	Brynäs IF	Skellefteå Kraft Arena	Recap
Andrew Calof 1 - 05:39; Kirill Kabanov 1 - pp - 18:06		**First period**	14:25 - Anton Rödin 1
Sebastian Aho 1 - pp - 01:01		**Second period**	No scoring
Daniel Widing 1 - 14:42		**Third period**	No scoring
Markus Svensson ( 23 saves / 24 shots )		**Goalie stats**	Bernhard Starkbaum ( 27 saves / 31 shots )

14 March	Brynäs IF	**2–4**	**Skellefteå AIK**	Gavlerinken Arena	Recap
Jonas Nordquist 1 - 08:43; Anton Rödin 2 - pp - 16:15		**First period**	07:19 - Andrew Calof 2
No scoring		**Second period**	17:21 - pp - Erik Forssell 1
No scoring		**Third period**	18:25 - Janne Pesonen 1; 18:42 - en - Erik Forssell 2
Bernhard Starkbaum ( 31 saves / 34 shots )		**Goalie stats**	Markus Svensson ( 25 saves / 27 shots )

16 March	**Skellefteå AIK**	3–2	**OT**	Brynäs IF	Skellefteå Kraft Arena	Recap
Anton Lindholm 1 - 01:42		First period		18:46 - Anton Rödin 3
No scoring		Second period		No scoring
Erik Forssell 3 - pp - 11:19		Third period		00:26 - Christian Djoos 1
Daniel Widing 2 - 03:35		First overtime period		No scoring
Markus Svensson ( 31 saves / 33 shots )		Goalie stats		Johan Holmqvist ( 31 saves / 34 shots )

18 March	Brynäs IF	**2–6**	**Skellefteå AIK**	Gavlerinken Arena	Recap
No scoring		**First period**	00:33 - Axel Holmström 1
Anton Rödin 4 - 12:08		**Second period**	10:01 - pp - Patrik Zackrisson 1; 11:20 - John Norman 1; 14:48 - Pär Lindholm 1; 15:54 - Andrew Calof 3
Ponthus Westerholm 1 - 06:28		**Third period**	11:09 - Tim Heed 1
Bernhard Starkbaum ( 20 saves / 25 shots ) Felix Sandström ( 5 saves / 6 shots )		**Goalie stats**	Markus Svensson ( 19 saves / 21 shots )

**Skellefteå AIK won series 4–0**

==== (2) Frölunda HC vs. (8) Luleå HF ====
12 March	**Frölunda HC**	**3–2**	Luleå HF	Scandinavium	Recap
Max Görtz 1 - pp - 10:53		**First period**	No scoring
Andreas Johnson 1 - 02:30; Max Görtz 2 - 05:48		**Second period**	15:01 - Peter Cehlárik 1
No scoring		**Third period**	18:12 - Johan Harju 1
Lars Johansson ( 29 saves / 31 shots )		**Goalie stats**	Joel Lassinantti ( 23 saves / 26 shots )

14 March	**Luleå HF**	**2–1**	Frölunda HC	Coop Norrbotten Arena	Recap
Daniel Zaar 1 - pp - 01:57		**First period**	No scoring
No scoring		**Second period**	16:23 - pp - Mattias Janmark-Nylén 1
Chad Billins 1 - pp - 10:39		**Third period**	No scoring
Joel Lassinantti ( 22 saves / 23 shots )		**Goalie stats**	Lars Johansson ( 23 saves / 25 shots )

16 March	Frölunda HC	**1–3**	**Luleå HF**	Scandinavium	Recap
No scoring		**First period**	06:25 - pp - Daniel Zaar 2
No scoring		**Second period**	12:19 - Kristian Näkyvä 1
Joel Lundqvist 1 - 09:06		**Third period**	19:05 - en - Niklas Fogström 1
Lars Johansson ( 23 saves / 25 shots )		**Goalie stats**	Joel Lassinantti ( 30 saves / 31 shots )

18 March	**Luleå HF**	**3–2**	Frölunda HC	Coop Norrbotten Arena	Recap
Per Ledin 1 - 06:47		**First period**	15:16 - pp - Mattias Janmark-Nylén 2
Lars Bryggman 1 - 14:59; Johan Harju 2 - 17:03		**Second period**	13:45 - pp - Joel Lundqvist 2
No scoring		**Third period**	No scoring
Joel Lassinantti ( 29 saves / 31 shots )		**Goalie stats**	Lars Johansson ( 23 saves / 26 shots )

20 March	**Frölunda HC**	3–2	**OT**	Luleå HF	Scandinavium	Recap
No scoring		First period		No scoring
Pontus Widerström 1 - 06:11; Joel Lundqvist 3 - 10:25		Second period		09:46 - Johan Forsberg 1; 13:56 - Johan Forsberg 2
No scoring		Third period		No scoring
Mats Rosseli Olsen 1 - 00:09		First overtime period		No scoring
Lars Johansson ( 19 saves / 21 shots )		Goalie stats		Joel Lassinantti ( 24 saves / 27 shots )

22 March	Luleå HF	0–1	**OT**	**Frölunda HC**	Coop Norrbotten Arena	Recap
No scoring		First period		No scoring
No scoring		Second period		No scoring
No scoring		Third period		No scoring
No scoring		First overtime period		01:31 - pp - Erik Gustafsson 1
Joel Lassinantti ( 26 saves / 27 shots )		Goalie stats		Lars Johansson ( 25 saves / 25 shots )

24 March	**Frölunda HC**	**4–2**	Luleå HF	Scandinavium	Recap

**Frölunda HC won series 4–3**

==== (3) Växjö Lakers vs. (6) Örebro HK ====
13 March	Växjö Lakers	**2–3**	**Örebro HK**	Vida Arena	Recap
No scoring		**First period**	No scoring
Sebastian Erixon 1 - 02:36; Rhett Rakhshani 1 - 05:39		**Second period**	No scoring
No scoring		**Third period**	04:14 - Johan Adolfsson 1; 15:22 - pp - Marcus Weinstock 1; 19:11 - Daniel Viksten 1
Cristopher Nihlstorp ( 17 saves / 20 shots )		**Goalie stats**	Július Hudáček ( 28 saves / 30 shots )

15 March	Örebro HK	**2–5**	**Växjö Lakers**	Behrn Arena	Recap
No scoring		**First period**	17:02 - Robert Rosén 1
Daniel Viksten 2 - pp - 14:45		**Second period**	04:13 - pp2 - Robert Rosén 2; 09:33 - Rhett Rakhshani 2; 12:41 - Jeff Tambellini 1
Brian Willsie 1 - pp - 16:29		**Third period**	18:32 - en - Nick Johnson 1
Július Hudáček ( 24 saves / 28 shots )		**Goalie stats**	Cristopher Nihlstorp ( 33 saves / 35 shots )

17 March	**Växjö Lakers**	1–0	**OT**	Örebro HK	Vida Arena	Recap
No scoring		First period		No scoring
No scoring		Second period		No scoring
No scoring		Third period		No scoring
Jeff Tambellini 2 - 02:57		First overtime period		No scoring
Cristopher Nihlstorp ( 21 saves / 21 shots )		Goalie stats		Július Hudáček ( 25 saves / 26 shots )

19 March	**Örebro HK**	**4–3**	Växjö Lakers	Behrn Arena	Recap
Daniel Viksten 3 - ps - 13:36		**First period**	02:47 - Jani Lajunen 1
Petr Zámorský 1 - pp - 01:39; Henrik Löwdahl 1 - 06:31; Mikko Lehtonen 1 - pp - 12:07		**Second period**	No scoring
No scoring		**Third period**	08:15 - sh - Erik Josefsson 1; 16:17 - Josh Hennessy 1
Július Hudáček ( 23 saves / 26 shots )		**Goalie stats**	Cristopher Nihlstorp ( 16 saves / 20 shots )

21 March	**Växjö Lakers**	**2–0**	Örebro HK	Vida Arena	Recap
No scoring		**First period**	No scoring
Jani Lajunen 2 - 00:18; Teemu Laakso 1 - 05:39		**Second period**	No scoring
No scoring		**Third period**	No scoring
Cristopher Nihlstorp ( 24 saves / 24 shots )		**Goalie stats**	Július Hudáček ( 30 saves / 32 shots )

23 March	Örebro HK	4–5	**OT**	**Växjö Lakers**	Behrn Arena	Recap
Kalle Olsson 1 - 10:45		First period		15:20 - Ville Varakas 1
Mikko Lehtonen 2 - 18:59		Second period		01:20 - Noah Welch 1
Petr Zámorský 2 - 06:07; Henrik Löwdahl 2 - 18:09		Third period		07:34 - Rhett Rakhshani 3; 19:46 - Jani Lajunen 3
No scoring		First overtime period		02:06 - Tomi Kallio 1
Július Hudáček ( 31 saves / 36 shots )		Goalie stats		Cristopher Nihlstorp ( 12 saves / 16 shots )

**Växjö Lakers won series 4–2**

==== (4) Linköpings HC vs. (5) HV71 ====
13 March	**Linköpings HC**	**3–2**	HV71	Saab Arena	Recap
Nichlas Hardt 1 - 04:58		**First period**	08:54 - Andreas Jämtin 1
Jakub Vrána 1 - pp - 03:51; Jakub Vrána 2 - 17:53		**Second period**	No scoring
No scoring		**Third period**	00:50 - Chris Campoli 1
David Rautio ( 22 saves / 24 shots )		**Goalie stats**	Gustaf Wesslau ( 23 saves / 26 shots )

15 March	**HV71**	**3–2**	Linköpings HC	Kinnarps Arena	Recap
No scoring		**First period**	No scoring
Erik Christensen 1 - 01:29		**Second period**	07:11 - Johannes Salmonsson 1; 07:54 - Jacob Micflikier 1
Mattias Karlsson 1 - 16:27; Erik Christensen 2 - 18:57		**Third period**	No scoring
Gustaf Wesslau ( 24 saves / 26 shots )		**Goalie stats**	David Rautio ( 19 saves / 22 shots )

17 March	Linköpings HC	**2–3**	**HV71**	Saab Arena	Recap
No scoring		**First period**	07:11 - Erik Christensen 3
Broc Little 1 - pp - 00:41		**Second period**	04:59 - Jere Karalahti 1; 18:59 - Anton Bengtsson 1
Mattias Sjögren 1 - 16:39		**Third period**	No scoring
Marcus Högberg ( 20 saves / 23 shots )		**Goalie stats**	Gustaf Wesslau ( 27 saves / 29 shots )

19 March	HV71	**2–4**	**Linköpings HC**	Kinnarps Arena	Recap
No scoring		**First period**	10:27 - Jacob Micflikier 2
No scoring		**Second period**	12:58 - pp - Jeff Taffe 1
Teemu Laine 1 - pp - 07:34; Mattias Tedenby 1 - 12:08		**Third period**	14:05 - Oscar Sundh 1; 19:49 - en - Broc Little 2
Gustaf Wesslau ( 29 saves / 32 shots )		**Goalie stats**	David Rautio ( 31 saves / 33 shots )

21 March	**Linköpings HC**	**3–2**	HV71	Saab Arena	Recap
Jonas Junland 1 - pp - 04:48		**First period**	05:42 - Chris Campoli 2
Jakub Vrána 3 - 06:59		**Second period**	15:47 - pp - Chris Campoli 3
Nichlas Hardt 2 - 11:37		**Third period**	No scoring
David Rautio ( 22 saves / 24 shots )		**Goalie stats**	Gustaf Wesslau ( 26 saves / 29 shots )

23 March	HV71	**2–4**	**Linköpings HC**	Kinnarps Arena	Recap
Erik Christensen 4 - 12:56		**First period**	18:04 - Nichlas Hardt 3
Erik Christensen 5 - pp - 10:05		**Second period**	No scoring
No scoring		**Third period**	06:02 - Daniel Rahimi 1; 16:17 - Nichlas Hardt 4; 19:12 - en - Broc Little 3
Gustaf Wesslau ( 30 saves / 33 shots )		**Goalie stats**	David Rautio ( 22 saves / 24 shots )

**Linköpings HC won series 4–2**

=== Semifinals ===
==== (1) Skellefteå AIK vs. (4) Linköpings HC ====
28 March	**Skellefteå AIK**	**5–2**	Linköpings HC	Skellefteå Kraft Arena	Recap
Patrik Zackrisson 2 - 3:22; Janne Pesonen 2 - 13:59		**First period**	12:24 - pp - Jonas Junland 2
Axel Holmström 2 - 7:23; Axel Holmström 3 - pp - 17:04		**Second period**	No scoring
John Norman 2 - 10:56		**Third period**	8:59 - Kent McDonell 1
Markus Svensson ( 34 saves / 36 shots )		**Goalie stats**	David Rautio ( 15 saves / 19 shots ) Marcus Högberg ( 16 saves / 17 shots )

30 March	Linköpings HC	**2–7**	**Skellefteå AIK**	Saab Arena	Recap
Jakub Vrána 4 - pp - 19:52		**First period**	2:39 - Andrew Calof 4; 4:11 - Pontus Petterström 1; 12:30 - pp2 - Erik Forssell 4
No scoring		**Second period**	1:50 - Erik Forssell 5; 7:10 - Erik Forssell 6; 11:59 - Tim Heed 2
Fredric Andersson 1 - 14:05		**Third period**	4:25 - pp - Axel Holmström 4
Marcus Högberg ( 7 saves / 10 shots ) David Rautio ( 7 saves / 11 shots )		**Goalie stats**	Markus Svensson ( 21 saves / 23 shots )

1 April	**Skellefteå AIK**	3–2	**OT**	Linköpings HC	Skellefteå Kraft Arena	Recap
No scoring		First period		17:05 - pp - Jacob Micflikier 3
John Norman 3 - 16:35; Patrik Zackrisson 3 - 16:57		Second period		No scoring
No scoring		Third period		1:49 - Nichlas Hardt 5
Niclas Burström 1 - 5:03		First overtime period		No scoring
Markus Svensson ( 18 saves / 20 shots )		Goalie stats		Marcus Högberg ( 24 saves / 27 shots )

3 April	**Linköpings HC**	**3–2**	Skellefteå AIK	Saab Arena	Recap
Jacob Micflikier 4 - 13:27		**First period**	No scoring
No scoring		**Second period**	No scoring
Jacob Micflikier 5 - 3:54; Broc Little 4 - 13:05		**Third period**	19:17 - pp - Erik Forssell 7; 19:52 - pp - Axel Holmström 5
Marcus Högberg ( 33 saves / 35 shots )		**Goalie stats**	Markus Svensson ( 11 saves / 14 shots )

5 April	**Skellefteå AIK**	**3–1**	Linköpings HC	Skellefteå Kraft Arena	Recap
No scoring		**First period**	No scoring
No scoring		**Second period**	17:30 - pp - Broc Little 5
Axel Holmström 6 - 4:51; Oskar Sundqvist 1 - 11:15; Martin Lundberg 1 - 11:50		**Third period**	No scoring
Markus Svensson ( 22 saves / 23 shots )		**Goalie stats**	Marcus Högberg ( 40 saves / 43 shots )

**Skellefteå AIK won series 4–1**

==== (2) Frölunda HC vs. (3) Växjö Lakers ====
29 March	**Frölunda HC**	**4–1**	Växjö Lakers	Scandinavium	Recap
Artturi Lehkonen 1 - 3:52		**First period**	No scoring
Lukas Bengtsson 1 - pp - 15:45		**Second period**	5:54 - pp - Robert Rosén 3
Artturi Lehkonen 2 - 17:07; Artturi Lehkonen 3 - en - 19:54		**Third period**	No scoring
Lars Johansson ( 29 saves / 30 shots )		**Goalie stats**	Cristopher Nihlstorp ( 14 saves / 17 shots )

31 March	**Växjö Lakers**	2–1	**3OT**	Frölunda HC	Vida Arena	Recap
Nick Johnson 2 - 11:13		First period		16:34 - Anton Blidh 1
No scoring		Second period		No scoring
No scoring		Third period		No scoring
Tuomas Kiiskinen 1 - 4:00		Third overtime period		No scoring
Cristopher Nihlstorp ( 39 saves / 40 shots )		Goalie stats		Lars Johansson ( 50 saves / 52 shots )

2 April	Frölunda HC	**2–4**	**Växjö Lakers**	Scandinavium	Recap
No scoring		**First period**	14:26 - Rhett Rakhshani 4
Andreas Johnson 2 - 4:08		**Second period**	No scoring
Max Görtz 3 - pp - 5:39		**Third period**	0:48 - pp - Noah Welch 2; 4:07 - Robert Rosén 4; 12:04 - Erik Josefsson 2
Lars Johansson ( 18 saves / 22 shots ) Linus Fernström ( 0 saves / 0 shots )		**Goalie stats**	Cristopher Nihlstorp ( 19 saves / 21 shots )

4 April	**Växjö Lakers**	**4–0**	Frölunda HC	Vida Arena	Recap
Jeff Tambellini 3 - 15:36		**First period**	No scoring
Tuomas Kiiskinen 2 - pp - 6:58; Josh Hennessy 2 - 17:02		**Second period**	No scoring
Nick Johnson 3 - pp - 13:24		**Third period**	No scoring
Cristopher Nihlstorp ( 23 saves / 23 shots )		**Goalie stats**	Lars Johansson ( 14 saves / 18 shots )

6 April	**Frölunda HC**	**1–0**	Växjö Lakers	Scandinavium	Recap
No scoring		**First period**	No scoring
No scoring		**Second period**	No scoring
Mattias Janmark-Nylén 4 - 16:02		**Third period**	No scoring
Lars Johansson ( 25 saves / 25 shots )		**Goalie stats**	Cristopher Nihlstorp ( 29 saves / 30 shots )

8 April	**Växjö Lakers**	**4–1**	Frölunda HC	Vida Arena	Recap
Sebastian Erixon 2 - 9:01		**First period**	No scoring
Nick Johnson 4 - 10:37		**Second period**	0:54 - pp - Mathis Olimb 1
Teemu Laakso 2 - 4:01; Ville Varakas 2 - en - 19:25		**Third period**	No scoring
Cristopher Nihlstorp ( 20 saves / 21 shots )		**Goalie stats**	Lars Johansson ( 18 saves / 21 shots ) Linus Fernström ( 0 saves / 0 shots )

**Växjö Lakers won series 4–2**

=== Finals ===
12 April	Skellefteå AIK	**1–2**	**Växjö Lakers**	Skellefteå Kraft Arena	Recap
Janne Pesonen 3 - 9:26		**First period**	5:27 - Rhett Rakhshani 5; 15:15 - Rhett Rakhshani 6
No scoring		**Second period**	No scoring
No scoring		**Third period**	No scoring
Markus Svensson ( 13 saves / 15 shots )		**Goalie stats**	Cristopher Nihlstorp ( 25 saves / 26 shots )

14 April	Växjö Lakers	**0–3**	**Skellefteå AIK**	Vida Arena	Recap
No scoring		**First period**	3:29 - Patrik Zackrisson 4
No scoring		**Second period**	10:57 - Kirill Kabanov 2; 17:56 - pp - Rob Schremp 1
No scoring		**Third period**	No scoring
Cristopher Nihlstorp ( 12 saves / 15 shots ) Stefan Steen ( 3 saves / 3 shots )		**Goalie stats**	Markus Svensson ( 25 saves / 25 shots )

16 April	Skellefteå AIK	**2–4**	**Växjö Lakers**	Skellefteå Kraft Arena	Recap
No scoring		**First period**	16:03 - Tuomas Kiiskinen 3
John Norman 4 - 18:18		**Second period**	8:33 - pp - Robert Rosén 5; 17:47 - Rhett Rakhshani 7
John Norman 5 - sh - 7:48		**Third period**	12:59 - Rhett Rakhshani 8
Markus Svensson ( 18 saves / 22 shots )		**Goalie stats**	Stefan Steen ( 23 saves / 25 shots )

19 April	Växjö Lakers	**1–2**	**Skellefteå AIK**	Vida Arena	Recap
No scoring		**First period**	3:03 - Axel Holmström 7
No scoring		**Second period**	No scoring
Jeff Tambellini 4 - pp - 11:57		**Third period**	13:43 - Pär Lindholm 2
Stefan Steen ( 14 saves / 16 shots )		**Goalie stats**	Markus Svensson ( 19 saves / 20 shots )

21 April	Skellefteå AIK	**1–4**	**Växjö Lakers**	Skellefteå Kraft Arena	Recap
No scoring		**First period**	7:21 - Jani Lajunen 4; 9:22 - Erik Josefsson 3
Janne Pesonen 4 - pp - 18:15		**Second period**	No scoring
No scoring		**Third period**	18:31 - en - Liam Reddox 1; 18:46 - en - Jani Lajunen 5
Markus Svensson ( 16 saves / 18 shots )		**Goalie stats**	Cristopher Nihlstorp ( 21 saves / 22 shots )

23 April	**Växjö Lakers**	3–2	**2OT**	Skellefteå AIK	Vida Arena	Recap
No scoring		First period		11:31 - Daniel Widing 3
No scoring		Second period		2:43 - Kirill Kabanov 3
Jani Lajunen 6 - 8:28; Jeff Tambellini 5 - pp - 14:11		Third period		No scoring
Tuomas Kiiskinen 4 - 10:21		Second overtime period		No scoring
Cristopher Nihlstorp ( 16 saves / 18 shots )		Goalie stats		Markus Svensson ( 35 saves / 38 shots )

**Växjö Lakers won series 4–2**

=== Statistics ===
==== Playoff scoring leaders ====
List shows the ten best skaters based on the number of points during the playoffs. If two or more skaters are tied (i.e. same number of points, goals and played games), all of the tied skaters are shown.

As of 23 April 2015

GP = Games played; G = Goals; A = Assists; Pts = Points; +/– = Plus/minus; PIM = Penalty minutes

Player	Team	GP	G	A	Pts	+/–	PIM
(Sweden) Axel Holmström	Skellefteå AIK	15	7	11	18	+4	0
(United States) Broc Little	Linköpings HC	11	5	9	14	+3	8
(Canada) Jeff Tambellini	Växjö Lakers	18	5	8	13	+8	2
(Sweden) Patrik Zackrisson	Skellefteå AIK	15	4	9	13	+4	4
(Finland) Tuomas Kiiskinen	Växjö Lakers	18	4	9	13	+4	2
(United States) Rhett Rakhshani	Växjö Lakers	18	8	4	12	+9	8
(Sweden) Robert Rosén	Växjö Lakers	18	5	7	12	+5	6
(Finland) Jani Lajunen	Växjö Lakers	18	6	5	11	+6	8
(United States) Andrew Calof	Skellefteå AIK	15	4	7	11	+3	2
(Sweden) Tim Heed	Skellefteå AIK	15	2	9	11	–2	0

==== Playoff leading goaltenders ====
These are the leaders in GAA and save percentage among goaltenders who played at least 40% of the team's minutes. The table is sorted by GAA, and the criteria for inclusion are bolded.

As of 23 April 2015

GP = Games played; TOI = Time on ice (minutes); GA = Goals against; SO = Shutouts; Sv% = Save percentage; GAA = Goals against average

Player	Team	GP	TOI	GA	SO	Sv%	GAA
(Sweden) Cristopher Nihlstorp	Växjö Lakers	16	1012:57	29	3	**92.12**	**1.72**
(Sweden) Joel Lassinantti	Luleå HF	7	417:06	13	0	**92.74**	**1.87**
(Sweden) Markus Svensson	Skellefteå AIK	15	932:20	29	1	**91.92**	**1.87**
(Sweden) Lars Johansson	Frölunda HC	13	815:16	27	2	**92.11**	**1.99**
(Sweden) Gustaf Wesslau	HV71	6	357:35	16	0	**90.86**	**2.68**

== SHL awards ==
Guldhjälmen: Derek Ryan, Örebro HK
Guldpucken: Victor Hedman, Tampa Bay Lightning
Honken Trophy: Joel Lassinantti, Luleå HF
Håkan Loob Trophy: Broc Little, Linköpings HC
Rookie of the Year: Marcus Sörensen, Djurgårdens IF
Salming Trophy: Tim Heed, Skellefteå AIK
Stefan Liv Memorial Trophy: Noah Welch, Växjö Lakers
Guldpipan: Mikael Nord

== See also ==
- List of SHL seasons
- 2014 in ice hockey
- 2015 in ice hockey
- 2014–15 HockeyAllsvenskan season
