= Växjö Lakers =

- City: Växjö, Sweden
- League: Swedish Hockey League
- Founded: 8 September 1997
- Home arena: Vida Arena (capacity: 5,750)
- Colors
- General manager: Henrik Evertsson
- Head coach: Fredrik Hellgren
- Captain: Joel Persson
- Website: vaxjolakers.se

Championships
- Regular season titles: 4 (2017, 2018, 2021, 2023)
- Le Mat Trophy: 4 (2015, 2018, 2021, 2023)

The Växjö Lakers Hockey Club (often referred to as the Växjö Lakers or VLH) are a Swedish professional ice hockey club from Växjö in Sweden. The club plays at the Vida Arena and plays in the Swedish Hockey League (SHL; formerly Elitserien), the top-level league of Swedish ice hockey, and made its debut there in 2011–12. Since entering the SHL the club has become known as one of the premier SHL clubs, winning the Le Mat Trophy as Swedish national Champions four times in 2015, 2018, 2021 and 2023 (the most of any SHL clubs since their promotion). Forwards Erik Josefsson and Robert Rosén are the only players to be a part of all four Championship-winning teams.

== History ==
The club was founded on 8 September 1997, after Växjö HC went bankrupt that year. the Växjö Lakers originally played in Växjö Ishall as their home arena, but prior to the 2011–12 season they moved to Vida Arena. The construction of the Vida Arena was finished in summer 2011.

The club began play in the 1997–98 season. Starting in Division 4, four divisions below the Elitserien/SHL, Växjö worked its way to HockeyAllsvenskan within 6 years, being promoted 3 times. With a perfect record in the 2003 HockeyAllsvenskan Kvalserien, the club qualified for HockeyAllsvenskan. Sensationally, during their debut season in HockeyAllsvenskan, the club acquired Shjon Podein, an NHL-merited North American player who played 699 NHL games and won the Stanley Cup with the Colorado Avalanche in 2001. The acquirement was described as "årets värvning" (acquirement of the year) by some people. During Podein's years in Växjö he became a crowd favorite. Prior to the following season, the 2004–05 season, the team also acquired Brad DeFauw, another NHL-merited North American player who played 9 NHL games and 154 AHL games. Both Shjon Podein and Brad DeFauw left the team after the 2004–05 season.

The club would spend 8 seasons in HockeyAllsvenskan and, during that time, reach the Kvalserien qualification for Elitserien three times. Växjö did not manage to promote to Elitserien in the 2009 and 2010 respective Kvalserien qualifications, but after winning the 2010–11 HockeyAllsvenskan season for the first time in club history and earning a third consecutive trip to Kvalserien, Växjö secured promotion to the top-tier league Elitserien in the eighth round (of ten) in the 2011 Kvalserien. The team finished the 2011 Kvalserien with 26 points, which is a record in the Kvalserien history.

The team formerly used red, yellow and blue as its colours, both in the team's logo and the team's jerseys. On 18 April 2011 it was announced that the club had changed the colours of their jerseys to blue and orange prior to the 2011–12 season. At that time it was also announced that the club's logo had been changed to an orange shield containing the name of the club beneath a lion holding a crossbow – an image from the Småland coat of arms.

=== Elitserien/Swedish Hockey League ===
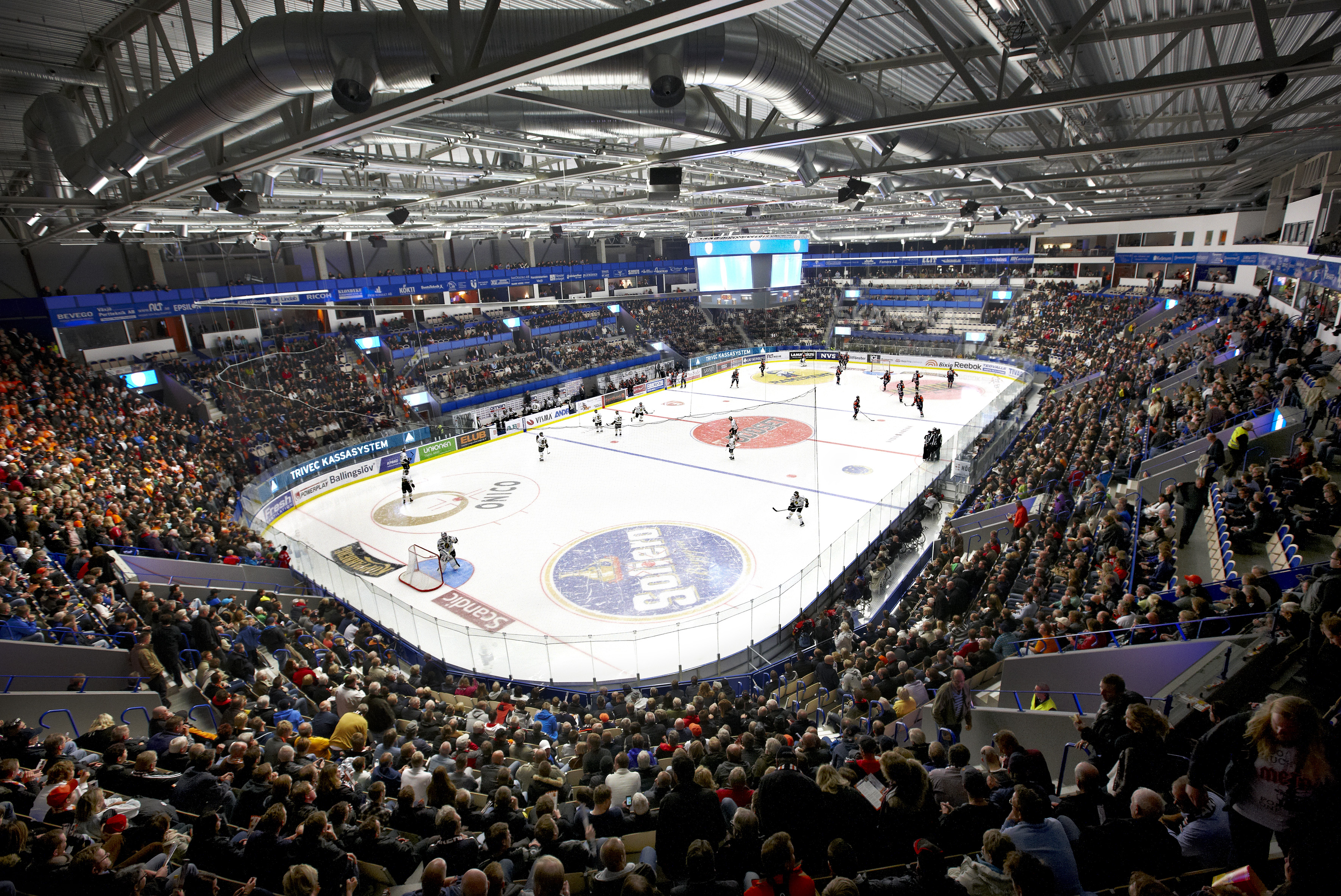
Växjö's home venue Vida Arena.

The club's first game in the Elitserien league was played on 13 September 2011, losing 0–2 to Frölunda HC in front of an outsold Scandinavium. Two days later, the club historically took their first points in Elitserien, beating Luleå HF on away ice 3–2 in a shootout, despite trailing by two goals in the third period. Their first home game was played on September 17, against Linköpings HC, in front of an outsold Vida Arena. Linköping won the game 4–2. Former Växjö Lakers crowd favorite Shjon Podein watched the game in the arena. Their first home points and regulation-time win came on September 27, when the Lakers won 4–1 against Modo Hockey. The Lakers' first shutout came on away ice when Modo were beaten 2–0 on 25 October 2011.

The Växjö Lakers played the first Småland derby game in Elitserien history, which was on away ice against reigning regular-season champions HV71, on 8 October 2011 in front of an outsold Kinnarps Arena—exactly 7,000 spectators—in Jönköping. the Växjö Lakers came out on top with a 3–2 victory in a shootout. Växjö Lakers forward Mike Iggulden scored three penalty shot goals in the game, two of them counted in the statistics.

== Season-by-season record ==
Season	Level	Division	Record		Avg. home atnd.	Notes
Season	Level	Division	Position	W-OT-L	Avg. home atnd.	Notes
This list features the five most recent completed seasons. For prior seasons, see List of Växjö Lakers seasons.
2020–21	Tier 1	SHL	1st	34–6–1–11	21	
2020–21	Swedish Championship playoffs		—	11–3	8	Won finals, 4–1 vs Rögle BK
2021–22	Tier 1	SHL	5th	28–5–2–17	3,691	
2021–22	Swedish Championship playoffs		—	0–4	5,420	Lost in quarterfinals 0–4 vs Frölunda HC
2022–23	Tier 1	SHL	1st	27–7–7–11	4,760	
2022–23	Swedish Championship playoffs		—	12–6	5,509	Won finals, 4–1 vs Skellefteå AIK
2023–24	Tier 1	SHL	2nd	29–4–4–15	4,952	
2023–24	Swedish Championship playoffs		—	4–4	5,564	Lost in semifinals 0–4 vs Rögle BK
2024–25	Tier 1	SHL	8th	17–9–7–19	5,111	
2024–25	Eighth-finals		—	2–1	5,257	Won 2–1 vs Örebro HK
2024–25	Swedish Championship playoffs		—	1–4	5,342	Lost in quarterfinals 1–4 vs Luleå HF

== Players and personnel ==
=== Current roster ===
No.	Nat	Player	Pos	S/G	Age	Acquired	Birthplace
21	(United States)	Brian Cooper	D	L	33	2022	Anchorage, Alaska, United States
25	(Sweden)	Lucas Elvenes	LW	L	27	2025	Ängelholm, Sweden
19	(Canada)	Reid Gardiner	RW	R	30	2025	Prince Albert, Saskatchewan, Canada
8	(United States)	Zach Giuttari	D	R	30	2023	Warwick, Rhode Island, United States
6	(Sweden)	Petter Granberg	D	R	34	2024	Gällivare, Sweden
28	(Sweden)	Hugo Gustafsson	C	L	26	2021	Södertälje, Sweden
24	(Sweden)	Karl Henriksson	C	L	25	2024	Malmö, Sweden
53	(Sweden)	Kevin Israelsson	D	R	21	2024	Grönskär, Sweden
12	(Finland)	Otto Koivula	LW	L	28	2024	Nokia, Finland
42	(Sweden)	Kalle Kratz	C	L	22	2025	Orsa, Sweden
4	(Canada)	Keegan Lowe (A)	D	L	33	2022	Greenwich, Connecticut, United States
13	(United States)	Dylan McLaughlin	C	L	31	2023	Lancaster, New York, United States
41	(Sweden)	Ludvig Nilsson	LW	L	32	2019	Stockholm, Sweden
94	(Sweden)	Joel Persson (C)	D	R	32	2020	Kristianstad, Sweden
32	(Sweden)	Ludvig Persson	G	L	27	2025	Göteborg, Sweden
40	(Sweden)	Dennis Rasmussen	C	L	36	2024	Västerås, Sweden
91	(Canada)	Félix Robert	C	L	27	2024	Lac-Mégantic, Quebec, Canada
36	(Sweden)	Elias Rosén	D	L	27	2023	Landshut, Germany
29	(Sweden)	Sebastian Strandberg	C	L	34	2024	Visingsö, Sweden
10	(Finland)	Eemeli Suomi	C	L	30	2025	Tampere, Finland
16	(Sweden)	Ville Svensson	C	L	21	2023	Kalmar, Sweden
49	(Sweden)	Leo Sahlin Wallenius	D	L	20	2024	Skövde, Sweden
62	(Sweden)	Manuel Ågren	LW	L	32	2022	Oskarshamn, Sweden
70	(Sweden)	Adam Åhman	G	L	27	2021	Västervik, Sweden

Updated 29 July 2025.

=== Team captains ===
- Mikael Bjerdahl, 2003–04
- Torsten Yngvesson, 2004–07
- Johan Markusson, 2008–14
- Tomi Kallio, 2014–15
- Liam Reddox, 2015–19
- Erik Josefsson, 2019–23
- Joel Persson, 2023–Present

=== Honored members ===
Växjö Lakers retired numbers
No.	Player	Position	Career	No. retirement
14	Stefan Nilsson	F	1990–1991, 1997–2003	–
38	Johan Markusson	RW	2005–2014	–
85	Liam Reddox	LW	2011–2019	–

== Club records and leaders ==
=== Scoring leaders ===
These are the top-ten point-scorers of the Växjö Lakers since their promotion to the SHL in the 2011–12 season. Figures are updated after each completed season.

Note: Pos = Position; GP = Games played; G = Goals; A = Assists; Pts = Points; P/G = Points per game; = current Växjö Lakers player

Points
Player	Pos	GP	G	A	Pts	P/G
Robert Rosén	C	508	148	214	362	.71
Joel Persson	D	349	44	192	236	.67
Liam Reddox	LW	386	72	78	150	.39
Erik Josefsson	C	607	73	75	148	.24
Richard Gynge	C	191	72	76	148	.78
Tuomas Kiiskinen	LW	206	58	72	130	.63
Cory Murphy	D	208	28	89	117	.56
Tomi Kallio	RW	204	43	73	116	.57
Dennis Rasmussen	C	202	50	60	110	.55
Emil Pettersson	C	131	41	58	99	.75

== Trophies and awards ==
=== Team ===
Le Mat Trophy

- 2014–15, 2017–18, 2020–21, 2022–23

=== Individual ===
Coach of the Year

- Sam Hallam: 2017–18

Honken Trophy

- Viktor Fasth: 2017–18

Rookie of the Year

- Elias Pettersson: 2017–18
