= Kalle Olsson =

Kalle Olsson may refer to:

- Kalle Olsson (ice hockey)
- Kalle Olsson (politician)
