= Philip Holm =

Swedish ice hockey player (born 1991)

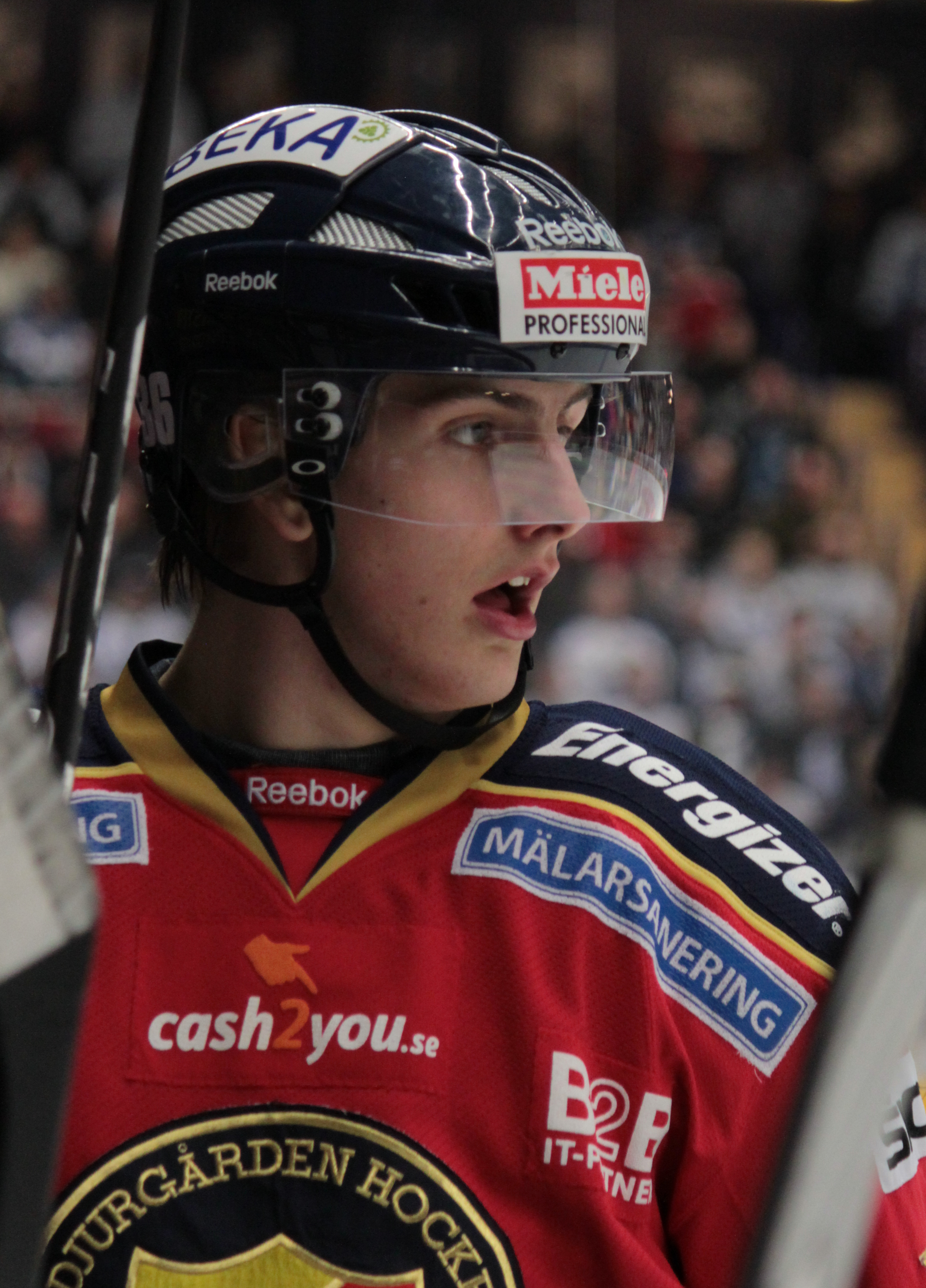
- Holm with Djurgårdens IF in 2012
- Born: 8 December 1991 (age 34) Stockholm, Sweden
- Height: 6 ft 2 in (188 cm)
- Weight: 194 lb (88 kg; 13 st 12 lb)
- Position: Defence
- Shoots: Left
- SHL team Former teams: Djurgårdens IF; Växjö Lakers; Vancouver Canucks; Torpedo Nizhny Novgorod; Lausanne HC; Metallurg Magnitogorsk; Jokerit; Örebro HK; SC Rapperswil-Jona Lakers
- National team: Sweden
- NHL draft: Undrafted
- Playing career: 2011–present

Philip Holm (born 8 December 1991) is a Swedish professional ice hockey player who is a defenceman for Djurgårdens IF of the Swedish Hockey League (SHL).

== Playing career ==
Holm began playing hockey in Huddinge IK before moving to Djurgårdens IF. He moved to Nacka HK for the 2008–09 season, where he played in their under-18 and under-20 teams. Holm also made an appearance in the club's senior team in the Swedish third-level league Division 1. He received more games with Nacka's senior team during the following season while still playing in the under-20 team. Holm returned to Djurgården and their under-20 team for the 2010–11 season.

Holm signed a two-year contract with Djurgården in February 2011. He was named as an extra player in the league game against Skellefteå AIK on 3 March 2011, but did not get any time on the ice. He played seven games, scoring one goal, with Djurgården in the 2011 edition of the pre-season tournament European Trophy. Holm received his first time on the ice in an Elitserien game in the league premier against HV71 on 15 September 2011. Holm scored his first Elitserien goal in the away game against Skellefteå AIK on 4 October.

After six seasons within the Djurgården organization, Holm left as a free agent in signing a two-year contract with fellow SHL competitors, the Växjö Lakers, on 20 April 2016.

Holm played one season with the Lakers before he implemented his NHL out clause in agreeing to a one-year, entry-level contract with the Vancouver Canucks on 26 May 2017.

To begin the 2017–18 season, Holm was assigned to the Canucks' American Hockey League (AHL) affiliate, the Utica Comets. On February 13, 2018, Holm was recalled by the Canucks and made his NHL debut, appearing in a solitary game before returning to the Comets. On February 26, 2018, the Canucks dealt Holm at the NHL trade deadline to the Vegas Golden Knights in exchange for Brendan Leipsic. The Golden Knight immediately assigned him to affiliate, the Chicago Wolves of the AHL for the remainder of the season.

On 17 July 2018, Holm (a restricted free agent) opted to leave North America in agreeing to a one-year contract with Torpedo Nizhny Novgorod of the Kontinental Hockey League (KHL). During his lone season with the club, Holm recorded seven goals and 26 points in 61 games. He also skated in the 2019 KHL All-Star Game.

On 13 August 2019, Holm made his return to North America, signing a one-year, two-way contract with the Chicago Blackhawks. Unable to secure a roster position with the Blackhawks at training camp, Holm began the 2019–20 season in the AHL with affiliate, the Rockford IceHogs. Holm made 30 appearances with Rockford, registering four goals and 15 points, before opting to mutually terminate his contract with the Blackhawks to resume his European career.

On 7 January 2020, Holm joined Lausanne HC of the National League (NL) on a one-year deal through the remainder of the 2019–20 season. He was brought in as a replacement for struggling fellow countryman, Jonas Junland.

As a free agent leading into the 2020–21 season, Holm returned to the KHL in agreeing to a one-year deal on 20 November 2020 with Metallurg Magnitogorsk. Holm found instant success with Magnitogorsk, posting 9 points in 22 regular season games, before leading the blueline in the playoffs with 7 points through 12 post-season games.

Holm opted to continue his career in the KHL, signing a two-year contract as a free agent with the Finnish-based club, Jokerit on 5 May 2021.

As a free agent following Jokerit's withdrawal from the KHL, Holm opted to return to Sweden by signing a three-year contract with Örebro HK of the SHL, commencing in the 2022–23 season on 29 July 2022.

After a one year stint with SC Rapperswil-Jona Lakers of the Swiss National League during the 2024–25 season, Holm returned to Djurgården for the 2025–26 SHL season.

== Career statistics ==
=== Regular season and playoffs ===
			Regular season					Playoffs
Season	Team	League	GP	G	A	Pts	PIM	GP	G	A	Pts	PIM
2008–09	Nacka HK	SWE.2 U18	12	7	8	15	8	—	—	—	—	—
2008–09	Nacka HK	SWE.2 U20	28	4	6	10	30	6	1	4	5	2
2008–09	Nacka HK	SWE.3	1	0	0	0	0	—	—	—	—	—
2009–10	Nacka HK	SWE.2 U20	19	7	18	25	24	2	1	1	2	4
2009–10	Nacka HK	Div.1	33	6	6	12	16	—	—	—	—	—
2010–11	Djurgårdens IF	J20	41	7	10	17	43	5	1	2	3	0
2010–11	Djurgårdens IF	SEL	1	0	0	0	0	—	—	—	—	—
2011–12	Djurgårdens IF	J20	4	1	0	1	4	—	—	—	—	—
2011–12	Djurgårdens IF	SEL	50	2	2	4	18	—	—	—	—	—
2012–13	Djurgårdens IF	Allsv	46	5	8	13	34	6	1	3	4	0
2013–14	Djurgårdens IF	Allsv	44	1	6	7	54	—	—	—	—	—
2014–15	Djurgårdens IF	SHL	51	2	7	9	20	2	0	0	0	4
2015–16	Djurgårdens IF	SHL	43	2	5	7	51	8	1	1	2	10
2016–17	Växjö Lakers	SHL	52	4	17	21	30	6	0	0	0	0
2017–18	Utica Comets	AHL	42	11	18	29	28	—	—	—	—	—
2017–18	Vancouver Canucks	NHL	1	0	0	0	0	—	—	—	—	—
2017–18	Chicago Wolves	AHL	21	1	8	9	16	3	1	1	2	4
2018–19	Torpedo Nizhny Novgorod	KHL	61	7	19	26	36	7	1	4	5	6
2019–20	Rockford IceHogs	AHL	30	4	11	15	22	—	—	—	—	—
2019–20	Lausanne HC	NL	9	1	1	2	6	—	—	—	—	—
2020–21	Metallurg Magnitogorsk	KHL	22	2	7	9	12	12	2	5	7	2
2021–22	Jokerit	KHL	39	10	15	25	22	—	—	—	—	—
2022–23	Örebro HK	SHL	32	4	21	25	12	13	1	1	2	6
2023–24	Örebro HK	SHL	50	3	13	16	24	—	—	—	—	—
2024–25	SC Rapperswil-Jona Lakers	NL	48	4	16	20	16	2	0	0	0	0
SHL totals			279	17	65	82	155	29	2	2	4	20
NHL totals			1	0	0	0	0	—	—	—	—	—
KHL totals			122	19	41	60	70	19	3	9	12	8
NL totals			57	5	17	22	22	2	0	0	0	0

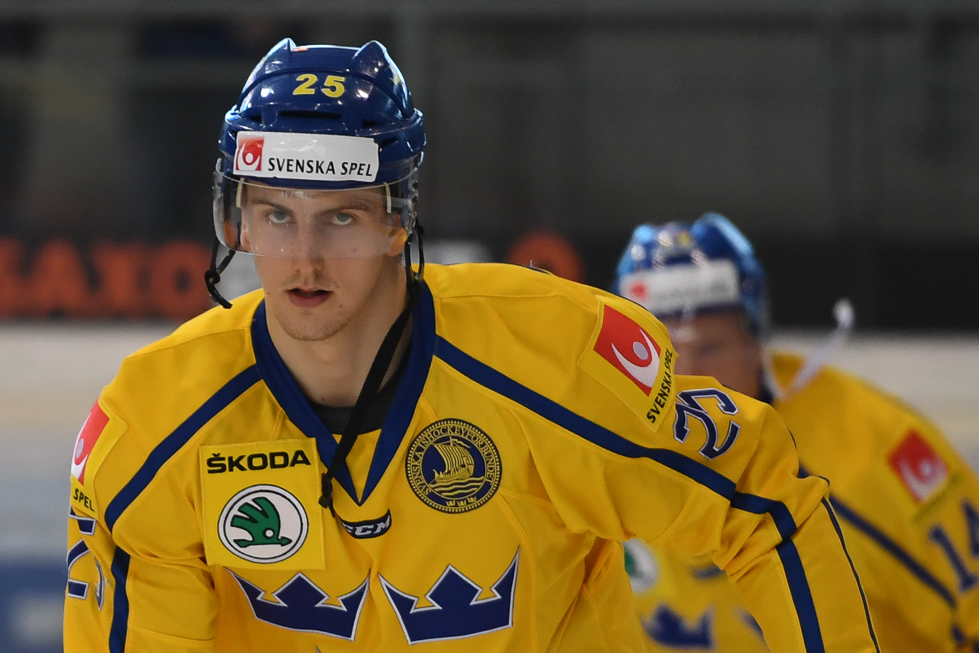

Medal record

Representing Sweden

Ice hockey

World Championships
Gold medal – first place	2017 Germany/France	

=== International ===
Year	Team	Event	Result	GP	G	A	Pts	PIM
2017	Sweden	WC	1st place, gold medalist(s)	7	1	2	3	0
2022	Sweden	OG	4th	6	0	1	1	2
Senior totals				13	1	3	4	2
