= 2015–16 SHL season =

- League: Swedish Hockey League
- Sport: Ice hockey
- Duration: September 2015 – April 2016

Regular season
- League champion: Skellefteå AIK
- Season MVP: Patrick Thoresen (Djurgårdens IF)
- Top scorer: Ryan Lasch (Frölunda HC)

Playoffs
- Playoffs MVP: Johan Sundström (Frölunda HC)
- Finals champions: Frölunda HC
- Runners-up: Skellefteå AIK

SHL seasons
- 2014–15 2016–17

The 2015–16 SHL season was the 41st season of the Swedish Hockey League (SHL). The regular season began in September 2015 and ended in March 2016. The playoffs were played in March–April 2016.

Modo Hockey and Karlskrona HK were forced to play in the SHL qualifiers to defend their SHL status. Karlskrona won their series against AIK in five games while Modo lost to Leksands IF over seven games. Therefore, Leksand were promoted to the SHL on the expense of Modo.

== Regular season ==
Teams participating in the 2015–16 SHL season

=== Standings ===
Pos	Team	Pld	W	OTW	OTL	L	GF	GA	GD	Pts	Qualification
1	Skellefteå AIK	52	33	4	4	11	160	103	+57	111	Qualification to Quarter-finals
2	Frölunda HC	52	30	7	0	15	169	112	+57	104	Qualification to Quarter-finals
3	Linköpings HC	52	23	9	7	13	163	121	+42	94	Qualification to Quarter-finals
4	Luleå HF	52	26	5	4	17	140	123	+17	92	Qualification to Quarter-finals
5	Färjestad BK	52	20	10	9	13	141	130	+11	89	Qualification to Quarter-finals
6	Växjö Lakers	52	25	4	4	19	147	139	+8	87	Qualification to Quarter-finals
7	Djurgårdens IF	52	23	5	7	17	144	135	+9	86	Qualification to Round of 16
8	Örebro HK	52	19	6	8	19	135	146	−11	77	Qualification to Round of 16
9	HV71	52	21	4	4	23	138	146	−8	75	Qualification to Round of 16
10	Brynäs IF	52	21	4	3	24	133	138	−5	74	Qualification to Round of 16
11	Rögle BK	52	16	4	6	26	125	154	−29	62	
12	Malmö Redhawks	52	15	5	6	26	116	153	−37	61	
13	Modo Hockey	52	13	3	4	32	119	166	−47	49	Qualification to Relegation playoffs
14	Karlskrona HK	52	5	4	8	35	120	184	−64	31	Qualification to Relegation playoffs

Source: Swedish Hockey League
Rules for classification: 1) Points; 2) Goal difference; 3) Number of goals scored

=== Statistics ===
==== Scoring leaders ====
List shows the ten best skaters based on the number of points during the regular season. If two or more skaters are tied (i.e. same number of points, goals and played games), all of the tied skaters are shown.

As of 8 March 2016

GP = Games played; G = Goals; A = Assists; Pts = Points; +/– = Plus/minus; PIM = Penalty minutes

Player	Team	GP	G	A	Pts	+/–	PIM
(United States) Ryan Lasch	Frölunda HC	51	15	36	51	+10	20
(Norway) Patrick Thoresen	Djurgårdens IF	49	15	33	48	+12	34
(Sweden) Patrik Zackrisson	Skellefteå AIK	52	15	33	48	+25	68
(Czech Republic) Milan Gulaš	Färjestad BK	51	20	25	45	–4	20
(Sweden) Richard Gynge	Växjö Lakers	46	21	23	44	+23	24
(Sweden) Andreas Johnson	Frölunda HC	52	19	25	44	+8	18
(Canada) Andrew Gordon	Linköpings HC	52	18	26	44	+18	30
(Sweden) John Norman	Skellefteå AIK	47	17	25	42	+5	18
(United States) Garrett Roe	Linköpings HC	41	14	27	41	+14	28
(United States) Matt Anderson	Djurgårdens IF	52	18	22	40	+8	30

==== Leading goaltenders ====
These are the leaders in GAA among goaltenders who played at least 40% of the team's minutes. The table is sorted by GAA, and the criteria for inclusion are bolded.

As of 8 March 2016

GP = Games played; TOI = Time on ice (minutes); GA = Goals against; SO = Shutouts; Sv% = Save percentage; GAA = Goals against average

Player	Team	GP	TOI	GA	SO	Sv%	GAA
(Sweden) Lars Johansson	Frölunda HC	36	1962:30	57	7	92.74	1.74
(Sweden) Markus Svensson	Skellefteå AIK	37	2148:23	66	7	92.20	1.84
(Sweden) Joel Lassinantti	Luleå HF	33	2002:46	65	4	92.12	1.95
(Sweden) David Rautio	Linköpings HC	28	1589:57	52	2	91.61	1.96
(Canada) Justin Pogge	Färjestad BK	26	1512:11	53	1	92.24	2.10
(Sweden) Marcus Högberg	Linköpings HC	28	1581:05	61	2	91.13	2.31
(Austria) Bernhard Starkbaum	Brynäs IF	28	1643:17	65	2	91.16	2.37
(Lithuania) Mantas Armalis	Djurgårdens IF	34	1985:52	80	2	91.82	2.42
(Sweden) Jonas Gunnarsson	Malmö Redhawks	44	2549:43	105	2	91.32	2.47
(Sweden) Fredrik Pettersson-Wentzel	HV71	43	2467:01	102	2	91.41	2.48

== Playoffs ==
The top six teams will qualify directly for the quarter-finals, while the four teams ranked 7–10 will play a best-of-three series and battle for the two remaining spots.

=== Playoff bracket ===
In the first round the 7th-ranked team will meet the 10th-ranked team and the 8th-ranked team will meet the 9th-ranked team for a place in the second round. In the second round, the top-ranked team will meet the lowest-ranked winner of the first round, the 2nd-ranked team will face the other winner of the first round, the 3rd-ranked team will face the 6th-ranked team, and the 4th-ranked team will face the 5th-ranked team. In the third round, the highest remaining seed is matched against the lowest remaining seed. In each round the higher-seeded team is awarded home advantage. The first round the meetings are played as best-of-three series and the rest is best-of-seven series that follows an alternating home team format: the higher-seeded team will play at home for games 1 and 3 (plus 5 and 7 if necessary), and the lower-seeded team will be at home for game 2 and 4 (plus 6 if necessary).

First round
7	**Djurgårdens IF**	**2**
10	Brynäs IF	1
8	Örebro HK	0
9	**HV71**	**2**

Quarterfinals
1	**Skellefteå AIK**	**4**
9	HV71	0
2	**Frölunda HC**	**4**
7	Djurgårdens IF	1
3	Linköpings HC	2
6	**Växjö Lakers**	**4**
4	**Luleå HF**	**4**
5	Färjestad BK	1

Semifinals
1	**Skellefteå AIK**	**4**
6	Växjö Lakers	3
(Pairings are re-seeded after the first and second round)
2	**Frölunda HC**	**4**
4	Luleå HF	2

Finals
1	Skellefteå AIK	1
2	**Frölunda HC**	**4**

=== Play In Round ===
The teams ranked 7 and 10, and the teams ranked 8 and 9, respectively, will face each other in a best-of-three series in order to qualify for the quarter-finals. The better-ranked teams in the two series will receive home advantage, i.e. two home games, if necessary. The two winners will take the two remaining quarter-final spots.

==== (7) Djurgårdens IF vs. (10) Brynäs IF ====
10 March 2016	**Djurgårdens IF**	5–4	**2OT**	Brynäs IF	Hovet	Recap
Patrick Thoresen 1 - 00:19; Daniel Brodin 1 - pp2 - 13:00; Matt Anderson 1 - 17:14		First period		17:33 - Jacob Blomqvist 1
Linus Hultström 1 - pp - 00:44		Second period		02:57 - Sondre Olden 1
No scoring		Third period		10:24 - Jörgen Sundqvist 1; 13:27 - Marc-Anthony Zanetti 1
Lukas Vejdemo 1 - 15:05		Second overtime period		No scoring
Mikael Tellqvist (38 saves / 42 shots)		Goalie stats		Bernhard Starkbaum (44 saves / 49 shots)

12 March 2016	**Brynäs IF**	**5–2**	Djurgårdens IF	Gavlerinken Arena	Recap
Marc-Anthony Zanetti 2 - 03:52; Pathrik Vesterholm 1 - 17:32		**First period**	No scoring
Greg Scott 1 - pp - 00:50		**Second period**	07:49 - pp - Daniel Brodin 2
Nick Johnson 1 - pp - 17:31; Ponthus Vesterholm 1 - en - 18:00		**Third period**	13:29 - Henrik Eriksson 1
Felix Sandström (31 saves / 33 shots)		**Goalie stats**	Mantas Armalis (25 saves / 29 shots)

14 March 2016	**Djurgårdens IF**	**5–4**	Brynäs IF	Hovet	Recap
Matt Anderson 2 - ps - 12:03		**First period**	17:44 - Nick Johnson 2
Linus Hultström 2 - 10:46; Marcus Sörensen 1 - 13:52; Linus Hultström 3 - pp - 19:32		**Second period**	03:55 - Jacob Blomqvist 2
Emil Lundberg 1 - 02:50		**Third period**	13:13 - Nick Johnson 3; 17:35 - Oskar Lindblom 1
Mikael Tellqvist (21 saves / 25 shots)		**Goalie stats**	Felix Sandström (27 saves / 32 shots); Bernhard Starkbaum (3 saves / 3 shots)

**Djurgårdens IF won series 2–1**

==== (8) Örebro HK vs. (9) HV71 ====
10 March 2016	Örebro HK	**2–3**	**HV71**	Behrn Arena	Recap
Marko Anttila 1 - 07:44		**First period**	No scoring
Joel Mustonen 1 - 00:57		**Second period**	11:23 - pp - Chris Campoli 1
No scoring		**Third period**	00:38 - Simon Önerud 1; 03:13 - Filip Sandberg 1
Július Hudáček (19 saves / 22 shots)		**Goalie stats**	Fredrik Pettersson-Wentzel (22 saves / 24 shots)

12 March 2016	**HV71**	**7–1**	Örebro HK	Kinnarps Arena	Recap
Oscar Sundh 1 - 12:34; Martin Thörnberg 1 - 14:57; Martin Thörnberg 2 - 15:38; Emil Johansson 1 - 17:10		**First period**	No scoring
Kevin Stenlund 1 - 06:50; Chris Campoli 2 - pp - 12:20; Ted Brithén 1 - pp2 - 19:43		**Second period**	No scoring
No scoring		**Third period**	06:04 - Kalle Olsson 1
Fredrik Pettersson-Wentzel (23 saves / 24 shots)		**Goalie stats**	Július Hudáček (7 saves / 11 shots); Henrik Lundberg (15 saves / 18 shots)

**HV71 won series 2–0**

=== Quarter-finals ===
==== (1) Skellefteå AIK vs. (9) HV71 ====
16 March 2016	**Skellefteå AIK**	**6–1**	HV71	Skellefteå Kraft Arena	Recap
Pär Lindholm 1 - 05:55; John Norman 1 - 14:10		**First period**	09:11 - Mattias Tedenby 1
Andrew Calof 1 - 11:39		**Second period**	No scoring
John Norman 2 - 00:52; Axel Holmström 1 - 01:55; John Norman 3 - sh, en - 09:18		**Third period**
Markus Svensson (17 saves / 18 shots)		**Goalie stats**	Fredrik Pettersson-Wentzel (28 saves / 33 shots)

18 March 2016	HV71	3–4	**OT**	**Skellefteå AIK**	Kinnarps Arena	Recap
No scoring		First period		10:18 - Andrew Calof 2; 11:36 - Niclas Burström 1
Lawrence Pilut 1 - 04:25; Chris Abbott 1 - 11:32		Second period		No scoring
Simon Önerud 2 - 19:46		Third period		01:49 - Mattias Ritola 1
No scoring		First overtime period		14:18 - Andrew Calof 3
Fredrik Pettersson-Wentzel (46 saves / 50 shots)		Goalie stats		Markus Svensson (26 saves / 29 shots)

20 March 2016	**Skellefteå AIK**	5–4	**OT**	HV71	Skellefteå Kraft Arena	Recap
No scoring		First period		No scoring
Mattias Ritola 2 - pp - 08:44; Andrew Calof 4 - 18:33		Second period		12:00 - Chris Campoli 3; 13:16 - Emil Johansson 2
Andrew Calof 5 - 04:26; Jimmie Ericsson 1 - 17:03		Third period		01:26 - Christoffer Törngren 1; 01:52 - Emil Johansson 3
Jimmie Ericsson 2 - 01:46		First overtime period		No scoring
Markus Svensson (15 saves / 19 shots)		Goalie stats		Fredrik Pettersson-Wentzel (23 saves / 28 shots)

22 March 2016	HV71	**0–1**	**Skellefteå AIK**	Kinnarps Arena	Recap
No scoring		**First period**	10:50 - Janne Pesonen 1
No scoring		**Second period**	No scoring
No scoring		**Third period**	No scoring
Fredrik Pettersson-Wentzel (12 saves / 13 shots)		**Goalie stats**	Markus Svensson (15 saves / 15 shots)

**Skellefteå AIK won series 4–0**

==== (2) Frölunda HC vs. (7) Djurgårdens IF ====
16 March 2016	**Frölunda HC**	**4–2**	Djurgårdens IF	Scandinavium	Recap
No scoring		**First period**	03:43 - Robin Álvarez 1
Artturi Lehkonen 1 - 01:47; Ryan Lasch 1 - 13:02		**Second period**	05:40 - pp - Patrick Thoresen 2
Andreas Johnson 1 - pp - 03:53; Artturi Lehkonen 2 - sh - 18:32		**Third period**	No scoring
Lars Johansson (24 saves / 26 shots)		**Goalie stats**	Mikael Tellqvist (36 saves / 40 shots)

18 March 2016	**Djurgårdens IF**	**3–1**	Frölunda HC	Hovet	Recap
Robin Álvarez 2 - 05:58		**First period**	No scoring
No scoring		**Second period**	04:37 - pp - Joey Crabb 1
Daniel Brodin 3 - pp - 18:51; Philip Holm 1 - en - 19:56		**Third period**	No scoring
Mikael Tellqvist (32 saves / 33 shots)		**Goalie stats**	Lars Johansson (25 saves / 27 shots)

20 March 2016*	**Frölunda HC**	**5–2**	Djurgårdens IF	Scandinavium	Recap
No scoring		**First period**	No scoring
Ryan Lasch 2 - 13:57; Johan Sundström 1 - 14:45		**Second period**	No scoring
Mats Rosseli Olsen 1 - 10:26; Artturi Lehkonen 3 - 13:49; Nicklas Lasu 1 - en - 15:44		**Third period**	07:35 - Patrick Thoresen 3; 19:04 - pp - Marcus Högström 1
Lars Johansson (28 saves / 30 shots)		**Goalie stats**	Mikael Tellqvist (33 saves / 37 shots)

22 March 2016	Djurgårdens IF	**1–3**	**Frölunda HC**	Hovet	Recap
No scoring		**First period**	No scoring
No scoring		**Second period**	12:22 - Oscar Fantenberg 1
Robin Álvarez 3 - pp - 14:35		**Third period**	09:20 - Artturi Lehkonen 4; 18:43 - Anton Axelsson 1
Mantas Armalis (35 saves / 38 shots)		**Goalie stats**	Lars Johansson (28 saves / 29 shots)

24 March 2016*	**Frölunda HC**	**5–1**	Djurgårdens IF	Scandinavium	Recap
Ryan Lasch 3 - pp - 13:20		**First period**	No scoring
No scoring		**Second period**	No scoring
Artturi Lehkonen 5 - 13:27; Andreas Johnson 2 - 14:27; Joel Lundqvist 1 - pp - 16:46; Mats Rosseli Olsen 2 - en - 19:23		**Third period**	01:24 - Marcus Högström 2
Lars Johansson (28 saves / 29 shots)		**Goalie stats**	Mantas Armalis (34 saves / 38 shots)

**Frölunda HC won series 4–1**

- Note: Games 3 and 5 were played at Frölundaborg.

==== (3) Linköpings HC vs. (6) Växjö Lakers ====
17 March 2016	**Linköpings HC**	**6–1**	Växjö Lakers	Saab Arena	Recap
Andrew Gordon 1 - 00:40; Sebastian Karlsson 1 - 01:25		**First period**	15:58 - Eric Martinsson 1
Daniel Rahimi 1 - 03:27; Broc Little 1 - 03:49		**Second period**	No scoring
Broc Little 2 - 05:36; Jonas Junland 1 - pp - 15:41		**Third period**	No scoring
David Rautio (18 saves / 19 shots)		**Goalie stats**	Cristopher Nihlstorp (11 saves / 15 shots); Stefan Steen (14 saves / 16 shots)

19 March 2016	Växjö Lakers	**2–3**	**Linköpings HC**	Vida Arena	Recap
Tuomas Kiiskinen 1 - 18:24		**First period**	No scoring
Richard Gynge 1 - pp - 15:53		**Second period**	02:46 - pp2 - Gustav Forsling 1
No scoring		**Third period**	04:18 - Niklas Persson 1; 12:47 - pp - Niklas Persson 2
Cristopher Nihlstorp (21 saves / 24 shots)		**Goalie stats**	David Rautio (22 saves / 24 shots)

21 March 2016	Linköpings HC	**2–3**	**Växjö Lakers**	Saab Arena	Recap
No scoring		**First period**	15:23 - pp - Liam Reddox 1
Jonas Junland 2 - 13:58		**Second period**	No scoring
Chad Billins 1 - 10:55		**Third period**	04:07 - Richard Gynge 2; 08:43 - Patrik Lundh 1
David Rautio (23 saves / 26 shots)		**Goalie stats**	Cristopher Nihlstorp (26 saves / 28 shots)

23 March 2016	**Växjö Lakers**	**3–1**	Linköpings HC	Vida Arena	Recap
Robert Rosén 1 - 10:08		**First period**	No scoring
Tuomas Kiiskinen 2 - pp - 09:48		**Second period**	02:19 - Henrik Törnqvist 1
Linus Fröberg 1 - 11:13		**Third period**	No scoring
Cristopher Nihlstorp (24 saves / 25 shots)		**Goalie stats**	David Rautio (22 saves / 25 shots)

25 March 2016	Linköpings HC	**1–4**	**Växjö Lakers**	Saab Arena	Recap
Jens Jakobs 1 - 16:50		**First period**	10:44 - Adam Byström Johansson 1
No scoring		**Second period**	04:42 - Tuomas Kiiskinen 3; 15:06 - Sakari Salminen 1
No scoring		**Third period**	09:04 - Joakim Hillding 1
David Rautio (29 saves / 33 shots)		**Goalie stats**	Cristopher Nihlstorp (18 saves / 19 shots)

27 March 2016	**Växjö Lakers**	2–1	**OT**	Linköpings HC	Vida Arena	Recap
No scoring		First period		14:06 - Chad Billins 2
No scoring		Second period		No scoring
Richard Gynge 3 - 17:58		Third period		No scoring
Robert Rosén 2 - 04:11		First overtime period		No scoring
Cristopher Nihlstorp (21 saves / 22 shots)		Goalie stats		David Rautio (22 saves / 24 shots)

**Växjö Lakers won series 4–2**

==== (4) Luleå HF vs. (5) Färjestad BK ====
17 March 2016	**Luleå HF**	**4–2**	Färjestad BK	Coop Norrbotten Arena	Recap
Lucas Wallmark 1 - 04:14		**First period**	No scoring
Peter Cehlárik 1 - 03:53; Brendan Mikkelson 1 - 10:16		**Second period**	No scoring
Jacob Micflikier 1 - en - 19:37		**Third period**	12:29 - Magnus Nygren 1; 18:56 - Mikael Johansson 1
Joel Lassinantti (23 saves / 25 shots)		**Goalie stats**	Justin Pogge (27 saves / 30 shots)

19 March 2016	**Färjestad BK**	**4–1**	Luleå HF	Löfbergs Arena	Recap
Mikael Johansson 2 - 03:50; Rickard Wallin 1 - 07:41; Joakim Nygård 1 - 16:14		**First period**	No scoring
No scoring		**Second period**	No scoring
Joel Eriksson Ek 1 - en - 18:43		**Third period**	06:18 - Lucas Wallmark 2
Justin Pogge (30 saves / 31 shots)		**Goalie stats**	Joel Lassinantti (25 saves / 28 shots)

21 March 2016	**Luleå HF**	**3–1**	Färjestad BK	Coop Norrbotten Arena	Recap
Jonathan Granström 1 - 03:52; Johan Harju 1 - pp - 17:26		**First period**	No scoring
No scoring		**Second period**	No scoring
Lucas Wallmark 3 - en - 19:02		**Third period**	15:08 - Milan Gulaš 1
Joel Lassinantti (19 saves / 20 shots)		**Goalie stats**	Justin Pogge (31 saves / 33 shots)

23 March 2016	Färjestad BK	**1–2**	**Luleå HF**	Löfbergs Arena	Recap
No scoring		**First period**	07:32 - Lennart Petrell 1
Johan Ryno 1 - pp - 10:04		**Second period**	00:49 - Lucas Wallmark 4
No scoring		**Third period**	No scoring
Justin Pogge (24 saves / 26 shots)		**Goalie stats**	Joel Lassinantti (20 saves / 21 shots)

25 March 2016	**Luleå HF**	**5–2**	Färjestad BK	Coop Norrbotten Arena	Recap
Lucas Wallmark 5 - 09:58		**First period**	13:58 - Niklas Arell 1
Lucas Wallmark 6 - pp - 05:56; Ilari Melart 1 - 08:25; Johan Forsberg 1 - 14:01; Lennart Petrell 2 - pp - 18:56		**Second period**	05:00 - Sebastian Erixon 1
No scoring		**Third period**	No scoring
Joel Lassinantti (28 saves / 30 shots)		**Goalie stats**	Lars Haugen (17 saves / 22 shots)

**Luleå HF won series 4–1**

=== Semi-finals ===
==== (1) Skellefteå AIK vs. (6) Växjö Lakers ====
1 April 2016	**Skellefteå AIK**	**2–0**	Växjö Lakers	Skellefteå Kraft Arena	Recap
No scoring		**First period**	No scoring
Mattias Ritola 3 - pp - 04:32; Patrik Zackrisson 1 - 07:22		**Second period**	No scoring
No scoring		**Third period**	No scoring
Markus Svensson (18 saves / 18 shots)		**Goalie stats**	Cristopher Nihlstorp (15 saves / 17 shots)

3 April 2016	**Växjö Lakers**	3–2	**OT**	Skellefteå AIK	Vida Arena	Recap
Patrik Lundh 2 - 01:14; Sakari Salminen 2 - pp - 19:07		First period		04:35 - Axel Holmström 2; 12:25 - pp - Tim Heed 1
No scoring		Second period		No scoring
No scoring		Third period		No scoring
Erik Josefsson 1 - 01:20		First overtime period		No scoring
Cristopher Nihlstorp (12 saves / 14 shots)		Goalie stats		Markus Svensson (23 saves / 26 shots)

5 April 2016	**Skellefteå AIK**	**2–0**	Växjö Lakers	Skellefteå Kraft Arena	Recap
Tim Heed 2 - pp - 09:42		**First period**	No scoring
No scoring		**Second period**	No scoring
Pontus Petterström 1 - 05:19		**Third period**	No scoring
Markus Svensson (15 saves / 15 shots)		**Goalie stats**	Cristopher Nihlstorp (29 saves / 31 shots)

7 April 2016	**Växjö Lakers**	**2–1**	Skellefteå AIK	Vida Arena	Recap
No scoring		**First period**	13:08 - pp - Erik Forssell 1
Richard Gynge 4 - 09:43; Richard Gynge 5 - pp - 19:38		**Second period**	No scoring
No scoring		**Third period**	No scoring
Cristopher Nihlstorp (25 saves / 26 shots)		**Goalie stats**	Markus Svensson (16 saves / 18 shots)

9 April 2016	**Skellefteå AIK**	**5–3**	Växjö Lakers	Skellefteå Kraft Arena	Recap
No scoring		**First period**	01:14 - Ilkka Heikkinen 1
Andrew Calof 6 - pp - 11:01		**Second period**	09:29 - pp - Calle Rosén 1; 13:17 - Alexander Johansson 1
Sebastian Aho 1 - 07:25; Martin Lundberg 1 - 12:44; Janne Pesonen 2 - pp - 16:24; Jimmie Ericsson 3 - en - 18:18		**Third period**	No scoring
Markus Svensson (25 saves / 28 shots)		**Goalie stats**	Stefan Steen (26 saves / 30 shots)

11 April 2016	**Växjö Lakers**	4–3	**OT**	Skellefteå AIK	Vida Arena	Recap
No scoring		First period		18:31 - Tim Heed 3
Robert Rosén 3 - pp - 03:35		Second period		01:20 - Mattias Ritola 4; 12:33 - John Norman 4
Eric Martinsson 2 - pp - 12:32; Tuomas Kiiskinen 4 - 19:59		Third period		No scoring
Linus Fröberg 2 - 16:10		First overtime period		No scoring
Stefan Steen (15 saves / 18 shots)		Goalie stats		Markus Svensson (40 saves / 44 shots)

13 April 2016	**Skellefteå AIK**	3–2	**OT**	Växjö Lakers	Skellefteå Kraft Arena	Recap
No scoring		First period		15:23 - Eddie Larsson 1
Martin Lundberg 2 - 05:15		Second period		No scoring
Mattias Ritola 5 - pp2 - 00:15		Third period		19:24 - Sakari Salminen 3
Erik Forssell 2 - 07:44		First overtime period		No scoring
Markus Svensson (22 saves / 24 shots)		Goalie stats		Stefan Steen (31 saves / 34 shots)

**Skellefteå AIK won series 4–3**

==== (2) Frölunda HC vs. (4) Luleå HF ====
2 April 2016	**Frölunda HC**	**1–0**	Luleå HF	Scandinavium	Recap
No scoring		**First period**	No scoring
No scoring		**Second period**	No scoring
Elias Fälth 1 - 07:10		**Third period**	No scoring
Lars Johansson (32 saves / 32 shots)		**Goalie stats**	Joel Lassinantti (28 saves / 29 shots)

4 April 2016	**Luleå HF**	**4–2**	Frölunda HC	Coop Norrbotten Arena	Recap
Jonathan Granström 2 - 16:28		**First period**	17:40 - Henrik Tömmernes 1
Jonathan Granström 3 - pp2 - 01:23; Peter Cehlárik 2 - 05:35		**Second period**	06:13 - Ryan Lasch 4
Lucas Wallmark 7 - en - 18:20		**Third period**	No scoring
Joel Lassinantti (19 saves / 21 shots)		**Goalie stats**	Lars Johansson (21 saves / 24 shots)

6 April 2016	**Frölunda HC**	**2–0**	Luleå HF	Scandinavium	Recap
Robin Figren 1 - 06:00		**First period**	No scoring
Johan Sundström 2 - pp - 17:17		**Second period**	No scoring
Mats Rosseli Olsen 3 - en - 19:56		**Third period**	No scoring
Lars Johansson (10 saves / 10 shots); Johan Gustafsson (6 saves / 6 shots)		**Goalie stats**	Joel Lassinantti (29 saves / 31 shots)

8 April 2016	**Luleå HF**	2–1	**OT**	Frölunda HC	Coop Norrbotten Arena	Recap
Jacob Micflikier 2 - 17:46		First period		No scoring
No scoring		Second period		02:59 - Artturi Lehkonen 6
No scoring		Third period		No scoring
Peter Cehlárik 3 - 08:16		First overtime period		No scoring
Joel Lassinantti (26 saves / 27 shots)		Goalie stats		Johan Gustafsson (25 saves / 27 shots)

10 April 2016	**Frölunda HC**	3–2	**OT**	Luleå HF	Scandinavium	Recap
Artturi Lehkonen 7 - 09:29; Henrik Tömmernes 2 - pp - 12:18		First period		No scoring
No scoring		Second period		08:08 - pp - Jonathan Sigalet 1; 19:55 - pp - Jonathan Granström 4
No scoring		Third period		No scoring
Joey Crabb 2 - 09:01		First overtime period		No scoring
Johan Gustafsson (17 saves / 19 shots)		Goalie stats		Joel Lassinantti (39 saves / 42 shots); Filip Gustavsson (1 save / 1 shot)

12 April 2016	Luleå HF	**2–8**	**Frölunda HC**	Coop Norrbotten Arena	Recap
No scoring		**First period**	18:39 - Mats Rosseli Olsen 4
Jonathan Granström 5 - pp - 18:36		**Second period**	00:31 - Joey Crabb 3; 15:18 - Nicklas Lasu 2; 17:37 - Nicklas Lasu 3
Brendan Mikkelson 2 - 08:28		**Third period**	02:07 - Ryan Lasch 5; 04:55 - Ryan Lasch 6; 06:26 - pp - Oscar Fantenberg 2; 10:10 - en - Oliver Lauridsen 1
Joel Lassinantti (21 saves / 28 shots)		**Goalie stats**	Johan Gustafsson (26 saves / 28 shots)

**Frölunda HC won series 4–2**

=== Finals ===
==== (1) Skellefteå AIK vs. (2) Frölunda HC ====
16 April 2016	Skellefteå AIK	**3–4**	**Frölunda HC**	Skellefteå Kraft Arena	Recap
Andrew Calof 7 - 12:00		**First period**	03:22 - Tom Nilsson 1
Erik Forssell 3 - 17:52		**Second period**	No scoring
Martin Lundberg 3 - pp - 19:47		**Third period**	03:58 - pp - Joey Crabb 4; 14:59 - Lukas Bengtsson 1; 19:20 - sh, en - Anton Axelsson 2
Markus Svensson (12 saves / 13 shots); Erik Hanses (22 saves / 24 shots)		**Goalie stats**	Johan Gustafsson (32 saves / 35 shots)

17 April 2016	Frölunda HC	**1–4**	**Skellefteå AIK**	Scandinavium	Recap
No scoring		**First period**	09:40 - John Norman 5
No scoring		**Second period**	05:17 - Erik Forssell 4; 09:57 - Sebastian Aho 2
Artturi Lehkonen 8 - pp - 07:15		**Third period**	14:19 - Pär Lindholm 2
Johan Gustafsson (18 saves / 22 shots)		**Goalie stats**	Erik Hanses (25 saves / 26 shots)

19 April 2016	Skellefteå AIK	**1–3**	**Frölunda HC**	Skellefteå Kraft Arena	Recap
No scoring		**First period**	10:58 - Joey Crabb 5; 16:22 - sh - Joel Lundqvist 2
Janne Pesonen 3 - pp - 16:20		**Second period**	No scoring
No scoring		**Third period**	17:38 - pp - Artturi Lehkonen 9
Erik Hanses (26 saves / 29 shots)		**Goalie stats**	Johan Gustafsson (29 saves / 30 shots)

21 April 2016	**Frölunda HC**	**3–2**	Skellefteå AIK	Scandinavium	Recap
No scoring		**First period**	No scoring
Ryan Lasch 7 - 14:59; Johan Sundström 3 - pp - 16:09		**Second period**	02:57 - pp - Patrik Zackrisson 2
Elias Fälth 2 - 08:35		**Third period**	00:18 - Erik Forssell 5
Johan Gustafsson (27 saves / 29 shots)		**Goalie stats**	Erik Hanses (26 saves / 29 shots)

24 April 2016	Skellefteå AIK	**3–5**	**Frölunda HC**	Skellefteå Kraft Arena	Recap
No scoring		**First period**	01:46 - Artturi Lehkonen 10; 08:02 - Nicklas Lasu 4; 14:06 - Artturi Lehkonen 11
Sebastian Aho 3 - 05:10; Pär Lindholm 3 - sh - 08:57		**Second period**	06:23 - Lukas Bengtsson 2; 11:01 - Ryan Lasch 8
Martin Lundberg 4 - 10:58		**Third period**	No scoring
Erik Hanses (2 saves / 5 shots); Johan Backlund (9 saves / 11 shots)		**Goalie stats**	Johan Gustafsson (40 saves / 43 shots)

**Frölunda HC won series 4–1**

Games in italics indicate games that will only be played if necessary to determine a winner of the series.

=== Statistics ===
==== Playoff scoring leaders ====
List shows the ten best skaters based on the number of points during the playoffs. If two or more skaters are tied (i.e. same number of points, goals and played games), all of the tied skaters are shown. Updated as of April 24, 2016.
GP = Games played; G = Goals; A = Assists; Pts = Points; +/– = Plus/minus; PIM = Penalty minutes

Player	Team	GP	G	A	Pts	+/–	PIM
(Finland) Artturi Lehkonen	Frölunda HC	16	11	8	19	+11	4
(United States) Ryan Lasch	Frölunda HC	16	8	11	19	+11	2
(Sweden) John Norman	Skellefteå AIK	16	5	8	13	+6	4
(Sweden) Mattias Ritola	Skellefteå AIK	16	5	8	13	–1	10
(Sweden) Richard Gynge	Växjö Lakers	13	5	7	12	+1	6
(Sweden) Linus Hultström	Djurgårdens IF	8	3	9	12	0	6
(Sweden) Jonathan Granström	Luleå HF	11	5	6	11	–1	14
(Canada) Andrew Calof	Skellefteå AIK	16	7	3	10	+3	4
(Sweden) Jimmie Ericsson	Skellefteå AIK	15	3	7	10	+5	20
(Sweden) Oscar Fantenberg	Frölunda HC	16	2	8	10	+8	6
(Sweden) Patrik Zackrisson	Skellefteå AIK	16	2	8	10	–4	6

==== Playoff leading goaltenders ====
These are the leaders in GAA and save percentage among goaltenders who played at least 40% of the team's minutes. The table is sorted by GAA, and the criteria for inclusion are bolded. Updated as of April 24, 2016.

GP = Games played; TOI = Time on ice (minutes); GA = Goals against; SO = Shutouts; Sv% = Save percentage; GAA = Goals against average

Player	Team	GP	TOI	GA	SO	Sv%	GAA
(Sweden) Lars Johansson	Frölunda HC	8	462:08	11	1	**94.69**	1.43
(Sweden) Markus Svensson	Skellefteå AIK	12	724:42	23	3	91.39	1.90
(Sweden) Cristopher Nihlstorp	Växjö Lakers	10	563:18	19	0	**91.40**	2.02
(Canada) Justin Pogge	Färjestad BK	4	231:33	8	0	**93.33**	2.07
(Sweden) Johan Gustafsson	Frölunda HC	9	506:22	19	0	**92.02**	2.25
(Sweden) Joel Lassinantti	Luleå HF	11	667:32	25	0	**91.88**	2.25

== SHL awards ==
Guldhjälmen: Anton Rödin, Brynäs IF
Guldpucken: Patrick Thoresen, Djurgårdens IF
Honken Trophy: Lars Johansson, Frölunda HC
Håkan Loob Trophy: Nick Johnson, Brynäs IF
Rookie of the Year: Ludvig Rensfeldt, Rögle BK
Salming Trophy: Jonas Junland, Linköpings HC
Stefan Liv Memorial Trophy: Johan Sundström, Frölunda HC
Guldpipan: Mikael Nord

== See also ==
- List of SHL seasons
- 2015 in ice hockey
- 2016 in ice hockey
