= Mattias Ritola =

Swedish ice hockey player (born 1987)

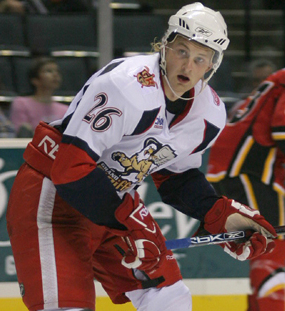
- Ritola with the Grand Rapids Griffins during the 2007-08 season
- Born: March 14, 1987 (age 39) Borlänge, Sweden
- Height: 6 ft 0 in (183 cm)
- Weight: 192 lb (87 kg; 13 st 10 lb)
- Position: Right wing
- Shot: Left
- Played for: Leksands IF; Detroit Red Wings; Tampa Bay Lightning; Modo Hockey; Skellefteå AIK; HC Fribourg-Gottéron
- National team: Sweden
- NHL draft: 103rd overall, 2005; Detroit Red Wings
- Playing career: 2007–2021

Mattias Kenneth Ritola (born March 14, 1987) is a Swedish former professional ice hockey forward.

== Playing career ==
Ritola made his debut in Sweden's top-tier SHL with Leksands IF during the 2005-06 season, after being drafted 103rd overall in the fourth round of the 2005 NHL entry draft by the Detroit Red Wings. Ritola joined the Red Wings for the 2007-08 season and played his first NHL game on March 15, 2008, against the Nashville Predators. Ritola did not qualify to be engraved on the cup because he did not play in a post-season game, but he was awarded a Stanley Cup ring, and he was included on the 2008 Detroit Red Wings Stanley Cup picture. Ritola played in his first post-season game on May 6, 2010, in a 7–1 win over the San Jose Sharks.

On Tuesday October 6, 2010, Ritola was claimed off waivers by the Tampa Bay Lightning. He scored his first NHL goal on October 30, 2010, against Ilya Bryzgalov of the Phoenix Coyotes. In late 2010, he was diagnosed with the Meniere's disease. Early in November 2011, Ritola cleared regular waivers and was assigned to Norfolk Admirals of the American Hockey League, however Ritola refused to report to the AHL club. On November 9, 2011, Ritola cleared unconditional waivers and his contract with Tampa Bay was terminated so he would be free to pursue playing opportunities in Europe. On November 10, 2011, Modo Hockey announced that he signed a contract to play until the 2012–13 season of Elitserien. His contract was extended to the 2015–16 season on January 4, 2013.

During the 2014–15 season, after 10 games with Modo, Ritola transferred to return to his original and fellow SHL club, Leksands IF on October 13, 2014. After spending the 2014-15 season with Leksands, he moved on to another SHL side, Skellefteå AIK. He was a regular on a Skellefteå squad that progressed to the SHL finals, where they were beaten by Frölunda HC.

On May 31, 2016, he signed a two-year deal with HC Fribourg-Gottéron of the Swiss National League A (NLA) and left the club on January 18, 2017, for personal reasons. He returned to Leksands IF shortly after parting ways with Fribourg.

== Career statistics ==
=== Regular season and playoffs ===
			Regular season					Playoffs
Season	Team	League	GP	G	A	Pts	PIM	GP	G	A	Pts	PIM
2002–03	Borlänge HF	SWE.3	25	6	14	20	4	—	—	—	—	—
2003–04	Västra Frölunda HC	J18 Allsv	11	4	11	15	35	7	2	7	9	12
2003–04	Västra Frölunda HC	J20	24	7	4	11	8	5	0	1	1	0
2004–05	Frölunda HC	J20	9	2	6	8	6	—	—	—	—	—
2004–05	Leksands IF	J20	18	8	10	18	14	5	1	1	2	2
2005–06	Leksands IF	J20	14	4	2	6	16	—	—	—	—	—
2005–06	Leksands IF	SEL	30	0	3	3	10	—	—	—	—	—
2006–07	Leksands IF	J20	12	5	7	12	16	—	—	—	—	—
2006–07	Leksands IF	Allsv	23	1	4	5	4	—	—	—	—	—
2006–07	Arboga IFK	Allsv	3	1	0	1	2	—	—	—	—	—
2006–07	Borlänge HF	SWE.3	11	4	6	10	14	—	—	—	—	—
2007–08	Grand Rapids Griffins	AHL	72	7	15	22	62	—	—	—	—	—
2007–08	Detroit Red Wings	NHL	2	0	1	1	0	—	—	—	—	—
2008–09	Grand Rapids Griffins	AHL	66	15	27	42	32	8	0	2	2	0
2009–10	Grand Rapids Griffins	AHL	73	19	23	42	50	—	—	—	—	—
2009–10	Detroit Red Wings	NHL	5	0	0	0	0	1	0	0	0	0
2010–11	Tampa Bay Lightning	NHL	31	4	4	8	11	1	0	0	0	0
2010–11	Norfolk Admirals	AHL	17	9	18	27	8	4	1	4	5	0
2011–12	Tampa Bay Lightning	NHL	5	0	0	0	6	—	—	—	—	—
2011–12	Modo Hockey	SEL	35	7	13	20	30	6	1	1	2	8
2012–13	Modo Hockey	SEL	50	11	13	24	12	5	2	1	3	4
2013–14	Modo Hockey	SHL	38	7	11	18	26	2	1	0	1	0
2014–15	Modo Hockey	SHL	10	2	2	4	12	—	—	—	—	—
2014–15	Leksands IF	SHL	42	10	22	32	18	—	—	—	—	—
2015–16	Skellefteå AIK	SHL	33	9	23	32	16	16	5	8	13	10
2016–17	HC Fribourg–Gottéron	NLA	27	4	13	17	22	—	—	—	—	—
2016–17	Leksands IF	SHL	16	1	6	7	6	—	—	—	—	—
2017–18	Leksands IF	Allsv	47	16	17	33	30	10	1	3	4	4
2018–19	Leksands IF	Allsv	11	2	7	9	0	10	3	8	11	14
2019–20	Leksands IF	SHL	47	8	9	17	42	—	—	—	—	—
2020–21	Leksands IF	SHL	23	5	7	12	4	4	0	2	2	2
SHL totals			324	60	109	169	176	33	9	12	21	24
AHL totals			228	50	83	133	152	12	1	6	7	0
NHL totals			43	4	5	9	17	2	0	0	0	0

=== International ===
Year	Team	Event	Result	GP	G	A	Pts	PIM
2005	Sweden	WJC18	3rd place, bronze medalist(s)	7	1	3	4	8
2006	Sweden	WJC	5th	6	2	2	4	2
2016	Sweden	WC	6th	8	0	1	1	2
Junior totals				13	3	5	8	10
Senior totals				8	0	1	1	2
