= Lennart Petrell =

Finnish ice hockey player

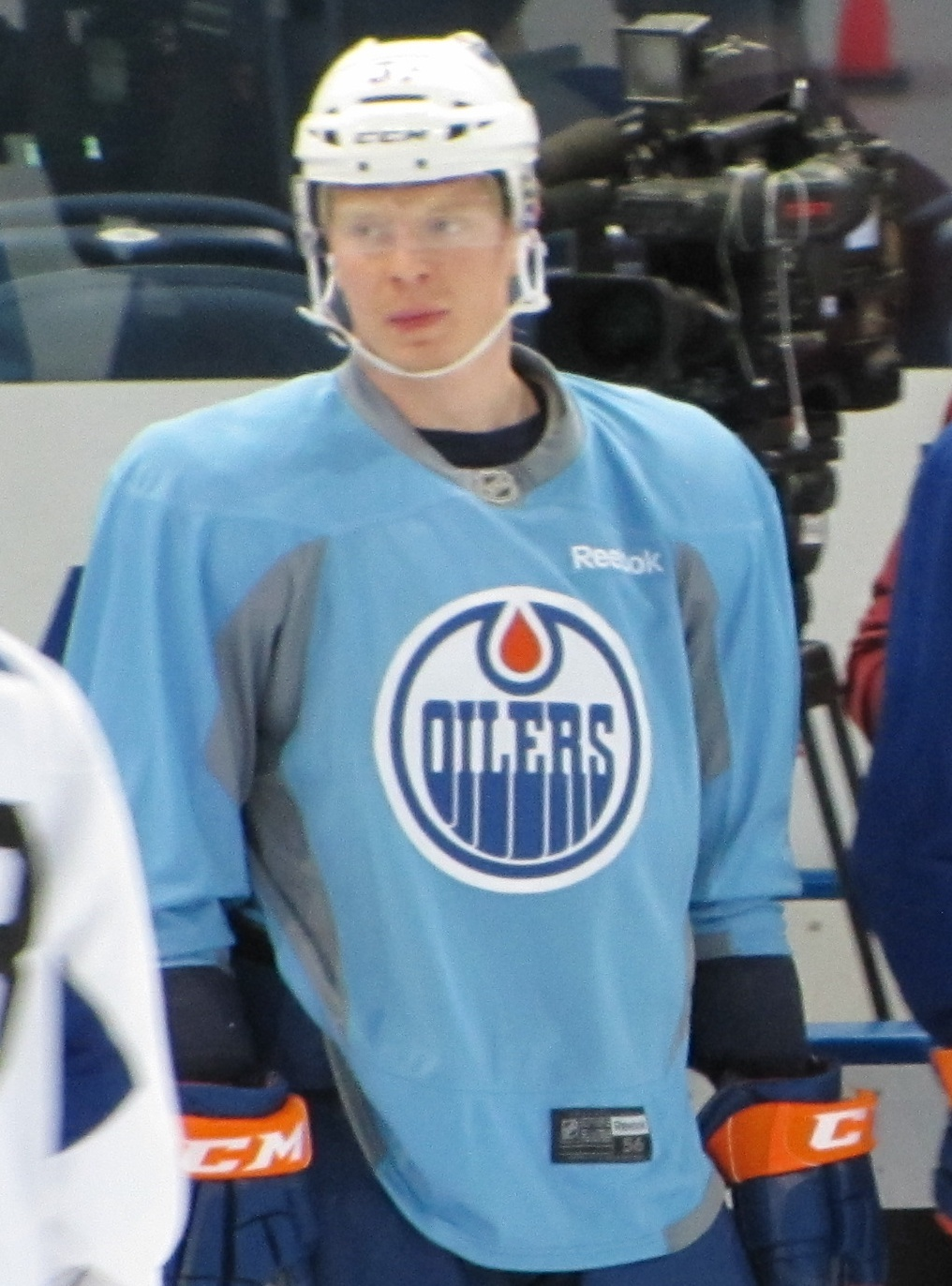
- Lennart Petrell at the 2013 Edmonton Oilers training camp
- Born: 13 April 1984 (age 42) Helsinki, Finland
- Height: 6 ft 3 in (191 cm)
- Weight: 215 lb (98 kg; 15 st 5 lb)
- Position: Left wing
- Shot: Left
- Played for: HIFK; Edmonton Oilers; Genève-Servette HC; Luleå HF
- NHL draft: 190th overall, 2004; Columbus Blue Jackets
- Playing career: 2003–2020

Lennart Petrell (born 13 April 1984) is a Finnish former professional ice hockey player, who most notably played with HIFK of the Finnish Liiga and the Edmonton Oilers of the National Hockey League (NHL). Petrell is currently an expert analyst for the 2026 World Junior Ice Hockey Championships.

== Playing career ==
He was originally drafted in the 6th round (190th overall) on the 2004 NHL entry draft by the Columbus Blue Jackets. Staying in his native Finland, Petrell played eight seasons with HIFK in the SM-liiga.

On 15 June 2011, he signed a one-year entry-level contract with the Edmonton Oilers. During his first North American season in 2011–12 with the Oilers, Petrell scored his first NHL goal on 3 November 2011, against Jonathan Quick of the Los Angeles Kings. On 2 January 2012, Petrell was reassigned to the Oklahoma City Barons of the American Hockey League for a nine-game stint before returning to the Oilers.

After a second season with the Oilers, Petrell was released as a free agent and returned to Europe, signing a one-year deal with Swiss club, Genève-Servette HC of the NLA on 14 August 2013. After one year in Switzerland, he signs a two-year deal with the Swedish club Luleå HF on 16 May 2014.

Following the 2015–16 season in Sweden, Petrell returned to his hometown club, HIFK, on a one-year contract on 12 May 2016.

Petrell was named the 27th HIFK captain prior to the 2017–18 season, succeeding Arttu Luttinen. He held the captaincy for two full seasons and the beginning of the 2019–20 season. In November 2019, head coach Jarno Pikkarainen reassigned the captaincy to Jere Sallinen, stating the decision was intended to "free" Petrell to focus on his individual performance. Sallinen described the appointment as coming "completely out of the blue" and noted his feelings were "conflicted" regarding taking the role from a long-time club figure. Petrell remained an alternate captain following the change and through the remainder of his final active season.

Petrell retired after the 2019–20 season. Although he remained under contract for the 2020–21 season, a heart-related finding discovered during summer medical evaluations prevented him from playing.

HIFK retired Petrell's jersey number 32 on November 29, 2025, at the Helsinki Ice Hall. Petrell is the 10th player of the club to have their jersey retired.

== Personal life ==
Petrell is serving as an expert analyst for Warner Bros. Discovery at the U20 World Championships in Minnesota. At the same time, Petrell will have the opportunity to closely follow the games of his former trainee, Matias Vanhanen.

== Career statistics ==
=== Regular season and playoffs ===
			Regular season					Playoffs
Season	Team	League	GP	G	A	Pts	PIM	GP	G	A	Pts	PIM
2000–01	Karhu–Kissat	FIN.2 U18	14	6	6	12	12	7	8	2	10	10
2000–01	Karhu–Kissat	FIN.2 U20	4	3	2	5	0	—	—	—	—	—
2000–01	Karhu–Kissat	FIN.4	1	0	0	0	0	—	—	—	—	—
2001–02	HIFK	FIN U18	18	10	8	18	12	8	2	0	2	2
2001–02	HIFK	Jr. A	5	0	0	0	0	—	—	—	—	—
2002–03	HIFK	Jr. A	28	2	2	4	35	7	3	1	4	29
2003–04	HIFK	Jr. A	33	11	17	28	28	10	6	7	13	2
2003–04	HIFK	SM-l	8	0	0	0	2	1	0	0	0	0
2004–05	HIFK	Jr. A	12	5	5	10	10	2	0	1	1	0
2004–05	HIFK	SM-l	35	3	2	5	35	4	0	1	1	2
2005–06	HIFK	SM-l	51	12	8	20	88	12	1	2	3	20
2006–07	HIFK	SM-l	53	19	11	30	74	5	0	0	0	2
2007–08	HIFK	SM-l	48	10	17	27	34	7	1	1	2	2
2008–09	HIFK	SM-l	43	7	13	20	85	2	0	0	0	2
2009–10	HIFK	SM-l	56	12	12	24	61	6	1	0	1	2
2010–11	HIFK	SM-l	56	13	22	35	34	13	7	5	12	8
2011–12	Edmonton Oilers	NHL	60	4	5	9	45	—	—	—	—	—
2011–12	Oklahoma City Barons	AHL	9	2	2	4	4	—	—	—	—	—
2012–13	HIFK	SM-l	26	11	0	11	12	—	—	—	—	—
2012–13	Edmonton Oilers	NHL	35	3	6	9	4	—	—	—	—	—
2013–14	Genève–Servette HC	NLA	50	5	16	21	24	12	1	2	3	0
2014–15	Luleå HF	SHL	50	5	5	10	16	9	0	2	2	2
2015–16	Luleå HF	SHL	32	3	4	7	8	11	2	0	2	4
2016–17	HIFK	Liiga	57	9	6	15	16	12	2	4	6	6
2017–18	HIFK	Liiga	57	12	12	24	37	14	2	2	4	6
2018–19	HIFK	Liiga	48	7	5	12	40	10	0	1	1	4
2019–20	HIFK	Liiga	34	2	1	3	10	—	—	—	—	—
Liiga totals			572	117	109	226	528	88	14	16	30	54
NHL totals			95	7	11	18	49	—	—	—	—	—

=== International ===
Year	Team	Event	Result	GP	G	A	Pts	PIM
2004	Finland	WJC	3rd place, bronze medalist(s)	5	0	0	0	27
Junior totals				5	0	0	0	27
