= Oscar Fantenberg =

Swedish ice hockey player (born 1991)

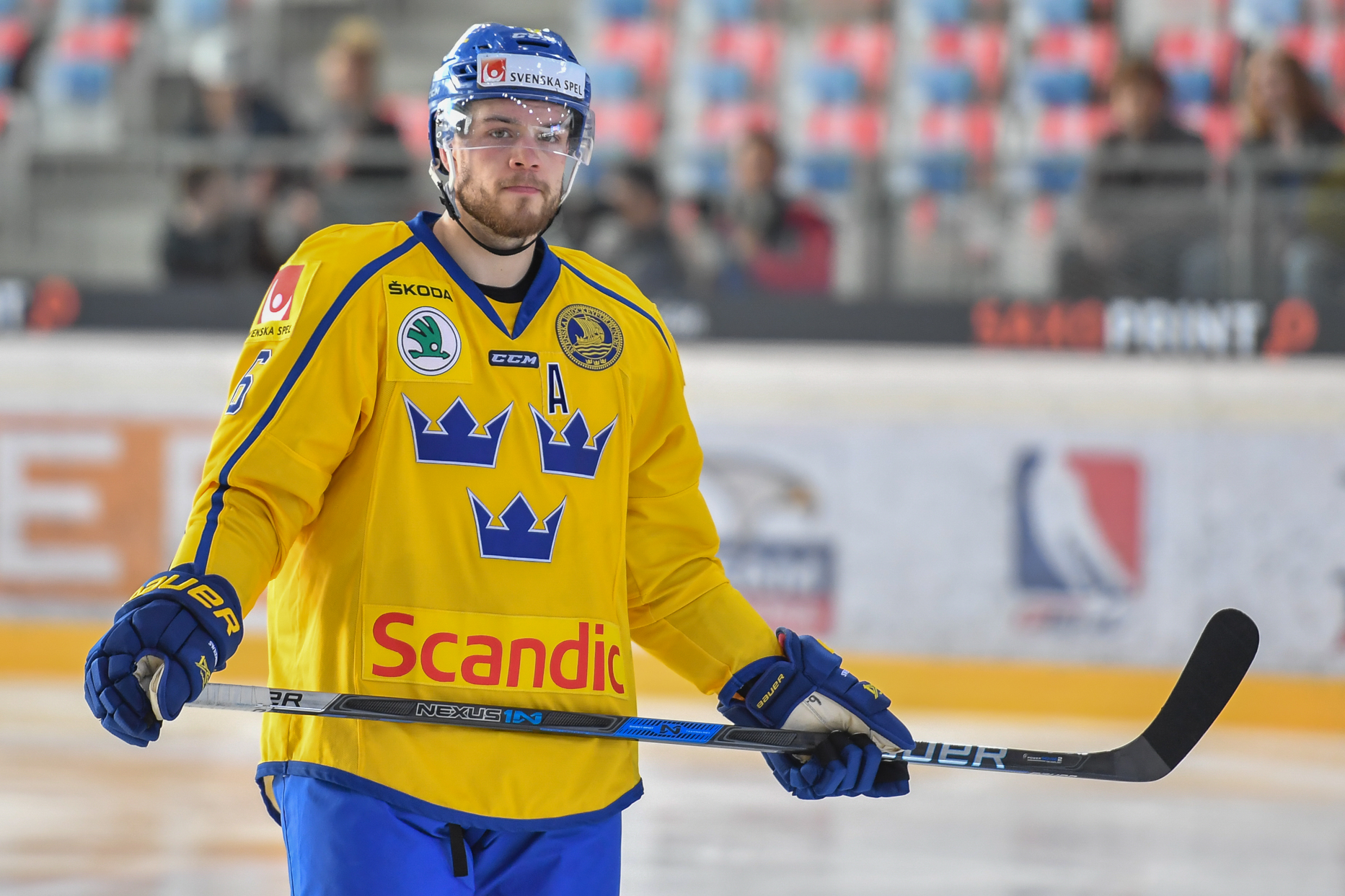
- Fantenberg with Sweden in 2017
- Born: 7 October 1991 (age 35) Ljungby, Sweden
- Height: 6 ft 0 in (183 cm)
- Weight: 203 lb (92 kg; 14 st 7 lb)
- Position: Defence
- Shoots: Left
- SHL team Former teams: Linköping HC; HV71; Frölunda HC; HC Sochi; Los Angeles Kings; Calgary Flames; Vancouver Canucks; SKA Saint Petersburg
- National team: Sweden
- NHL draft: Undrafted
- Playing career: 2009–present

Oscar Fantenberg (born 7 October 1991) is a Swedish professional ice hockey defenceman who is currently playing for Linköping HC in the Swedish Hockey League (SHL). Undrafted, he has previously played for the Vancouver Canucks, Los Angeles Kings and Calgary Flames in the National Hockey League (NHL), in addition to playing for HC Sochi and SKA Saint Petersburg in the Kontinental Hockey League (KHL).

== Playing career ==
Fantenberg was a product at the youth level of IF Troja-Ljungby. In 2009, he moved to HV71, where he made his debut in the Elitserien during the 2010–11 Elitserien season. After five years with the club, he signed with Frölunda HC in 2014. In his second year with Frölunda, the 2015–16 campaign, he helped win the Swedish championship and the title in the Champions Hockey League.

Fantenberg secured his first contract abroad before the 2016–17 season when he inked a one-year contract with HC Sochi of the Kontinental Hockey League (KHL). Fantenberg adapted quickly to the KHL, embracing a top-pairing role in appearing in 44 games. In contributing with three goals and 23 points, he was Sochi's initial representative to be selected for the KHL All-Star Game.

A free agent following his successful season in Sochi, Fantenberg gained NHL attention and agreed to a one-year, entry-level contract with the Los Angeles Kings on 4 May 2017.

Fantenberg participated in the Kings' rookie and main roster training camp before making his pre-season NHL debut with the Kings on 16 September 2017. In quickly adapting to the North American style, Fantenberg made the Kings opening night roster for the 2017–18 season. He made his NHL debut with the Kings, playing 17 minutes in a second-pairing role in a 2–0 victory over the Philadelphia Flyers on 5 October 2017. On 9 November 2017, he scored his first career NHL goal, coming in a 5–2 loss against the Tampa Bay Lightning.

Fantenberg made the Kings' opening roster to begin the 2018–19 season. In his first full season in the NHL, he earned a third-pairing role on the blueline and appeared in 46 games with the Kings, registering two goals and one assist. On 25 February 2019, he was traded to the Calgary Flames in exchange for a fourth-round pick in the 2020 NHL entry draft.

On 1 July 2019, Fantenberg left the Flames as a free agent and signed a one-year $850,000 contract with the Vancouver Canucks. Fantenberg made the Canucks roster out of training camp as the team's seventh defenceman but was unable to draw into the lineup. Fantenberg finally made his season debut on December 1, before scoring his first goal with Vancouver two nights later, in a 5–2 win over the Ottawa Senators.

On October 27, 2020, Fantenberg left the NHL and signed a one-year contract with SKA Saint Petersburg of the Kontinental Hockey League (KHL).

On 24 May 2022, Fantenberg returned to the SHL by signing a four-year contract with Linköping HC.

== International play ==
Fantenberg made his debut with Sweden national senior team in October 2012. He was later selected to make his full senior debut in the 2016 IIHF World Championship.

== Career statistics ==
=== Regular season and playoffs ===
			Regular season					Playoffs
Season	Team	League	GP	G	A	Pts	PIM	GP	G	A	Pts	PIM
2008–09	IF Troja/Ljungby	J20	36	10	16	26	30	—	—	—	—	—
2008–09	IF Troja/Ljungby	Allsv	3	0	0	0	0	—	—	—	—	—
2009–10	HV71	J20	36	7	13	20	28	2	1	0	1	2
2009–10	HV71	SEL	3	0	1	1	0	—	—	—	—	—
2009–10	IK Oskarshamn	Allsv	4	1	0	1	0	—	—	—	—	—
2010–11	HV71	J20	25	8	7	15	12	5	1	3	4	6
2010–11	HV71	SEL	8	0	0	0	0	2	0	0	0	0
2010–11	IF Troja/Ljungby	Allsv	8	2	1	3	8	—	—	—	—	—
2011–12	HV71	J20	9	1	6	7	8	—	—	—	—	—
2011–12	HV71	SEL	37	3	4	7	6	—	—	—	—	—
2011–12	IF Troja/Ljungby	Allsv	13	1	3	4	2	—	—	—	—	—
2012–13	HV71	SEL	28	3	11	14	12	—	—	—	—	—
2013–14	HV71	SHL	47	2	11	13	14	8	0	2	2	22
2014–15	Frölunda HC	SHL	50	2	7	9	38	13	0	5	5	0
2015–16	Frölunda HC	SHL	43	4	13	17	14	16	2	8	10	6
2016–17	HC Sochi	KHL	44	3	20	23	22	—	—	—	—	—
2017–18	Los Angeles Kings	NHL	27	2	7	9	11	4	0	1	1	2
2017–18	Ontario Reign	AHL	25	1	12	13	8	4	1	1	2	2
2018–19	Los Angeles Kings	NHL	46	2	1	3	10	—	—	—	—	—
2018–19	Calgary Flames	NHL	15	0	1	1	7	3	0	0	0	6
2019–20	Vancouver Canucks	NHL	36	1	5	6	6	16	0	0	0	4
2019–20	Utica Comets	AHL	2	0	0	0	0	—	—	—	—	—
2020–21	SKA Saint Petersburg	KHL	37	0	7	7	16	15	0	2	2	4
2021–22	SKA Saint Petersburg	KHL	33	0	5	5	19	12	1	3	4	2
2022–23	Linköping HC	SHL	42	4	19	23	18	—	—	—	—	—
2023–24	Linköping HC	SHL	42	3	20	23	20	4	1	0	1	0
2024–25	Linköping HC	SHL	38	6	14	20	14	—	—	—	—	—
SHL totals			338	27	100	127	136	43	3	15	18	28
KHL totals			114	3	32	35	57	27	1	5	6	6
NHL totals			124	5	14	19	34	23	0	1	1	12

=== International ===
Year	Team	Event	Result	GP	G	A	Pts	PIM
2016	Sweden	WC	6th	8	0	1	1	2
2022	Sweden	OG	4th	6	0	0	0	0
Senior totals				14	0	1	1	2

== Awards and honours ==
Award	Year
CHL
Champions (Frölunda HC)	2016
SHL
Le Mat Trophy (Frölunda HC)	2016
KHL
All-Star Game	2017*
