= John Norman (ice hockey) =

Swedish ice hockey player (born 1991)

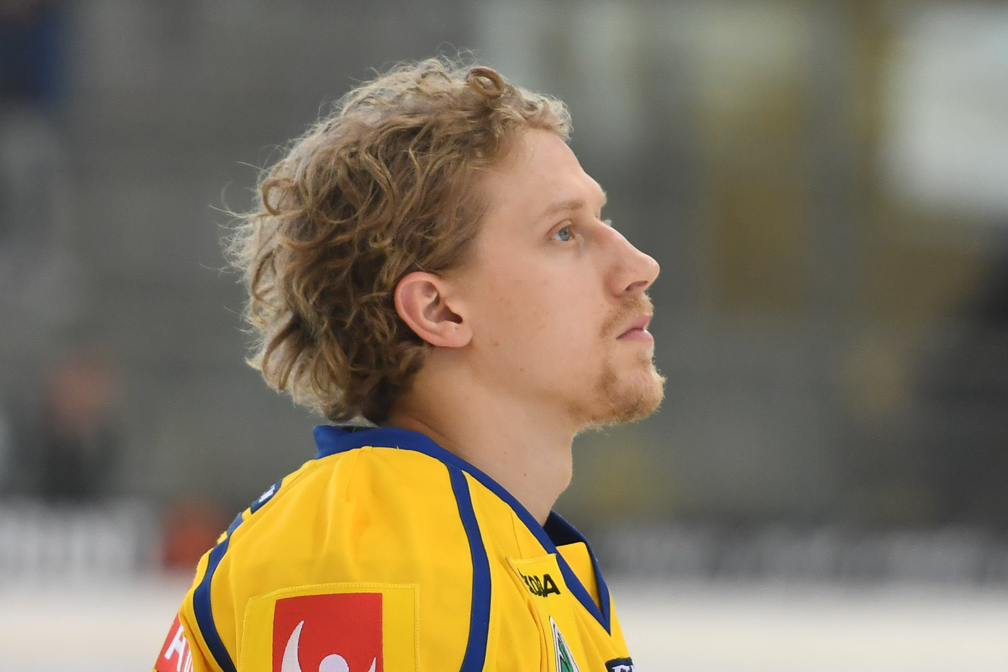
- Born: 6 January 1991 (age 35) Stockholm, Sweden
- Height: 5 ft 11 in (180 cm)
- Weight: 171 lb (78 kg; 12 st 3 lb)
- Position: Centre
- Shoots: Left
- Allsv team Former teams: Djurgårdens IF; Oulun Kärpät; Skellefteå AIK; Torpedo Nizhny Novgorod; Jokerit
- National team: Sweden
- Playing career: 2010–present

John Norman (born 6 January 1991) is a Swedish professional ice hockey player. He is currently a centre for Djurgårdens IF of the HockeyAllsvenskan (Allsv).

== Playing career ==
Norman began playing hockey in the local club Danderyds SK. He is the oldest of five brothers. He played Stocksund's under-18 team until the 2007–08 season when he moved to Djurgården. He also participated in TV-pucken the same season. Norman's team, Stockholm/Vit, reached the final, which ended with a 2–1 defeat to Småland. Norman had a successful season in Djurgården's J20 team, scoring 15 goals and 49 points in 42 games, and signed a two-year deal to play in Djurgården's senior team in February 2010. He had already debuted in Elitserien before this, on October 27, 2009 against Skellefteå AIK.

Norman moved to Kärpät of Finland for the 2012–13 season and after a single season with the club returned to his native Sweden, where he signed with Skellefteå AIK of the SHL. He helped the team win the Swedish national championship his first year and reached the SHL finals with Skellefteå in 2015 and 2016. He was AIK's second-best scorer of the 2015–16 regular season, tallying 17 goals and 25 assists.

Following the 2015–16 campaign, he took his game to the Kontinental Hockey League, signing with Torpedo Nizhny Novgorod. On August 19, 2017, it was announced that Norman will continue his KHL career with Jokerit of Helsinki, Finland.

Norman played five seasons with Jokerit before the club withdrew from the KHL during the 2021–22 season due to the Russian invasion of Ukraine.

As a free agent from Jokerit, Norman opted to return to his original Swedish club, Djurgårdens IF, signing a two-year contract on 21 April 2022 in the hopes of returning the club to the SHL following their relegation to the Allsvenskan the previous season.

== International play ==
Norman made his debut on Sweden's men's national team in November 2015.

== Career statistics ==
=== Regular season and playoffs ===
			Regular season					Playoffs
Season	Team	League	GP	G	A	Pts	PIM	GP	G	A	Pts	PIM
2006–07	Stocksunds IF	J18	28	15	25	40	53	—	—	—	—	—
2007–08	Djurgårdens IF	J18	22	12	30	42	12	—	—	—	—	—
2007–08	Djurgårdens IF	J18 Allsv	14	5	16	21	16	8	6	2	8	6
2008–09	Djurgårdens IF	J18	5	4	7	11	31	—	—	—	—	—
2008–09	Djurgårdens IF	J18 Allsv	5	4	7	11	2	2	2	2	4	0
2008–09	Djurgårdens IF	J20	35	7	18	25	47	5	0	2	2	0
2009–10	Djurgårdens IF	J20	42	15	34	49	22	—	—	—	—	—
2009–10	Djurgårdens IF	SEL	7	0	0	0	0	—	—	—	—	—
2010–11	Djurgårdens IF	SEL	50	8	9	17	10	7	0	1	1	6
2010–11	Djurgårdens IF	J20	—	—	—	—	—	5	1	7	8	2
2011–12	Djurgårdens IF	SEL	55	4	13	17	10	—	—	—	—	—
2012–13	Kärpät	SM-l	28	2	6	8	8	3	0	1	1	0
2013–14	Skellefteå AIK	SHL	48	4	9	13	10	14	2	2	4	12
2014–15	Skellefteå AIK	SHL	47	5	8	13	16	15	5	3	8	2
2015–16	Skellefteå AIK	SHL	47	17	25	42	18	16	5	8	13	4
2016–17	Torpedo Nizhny Novgorod	KHL	50	7	8	15	14	5	2	1	3	4
2017–18	Jokerit	KHL	50	8	20	28	46	11	2	1	3	6
2018–19	Jokerit	KHL	61	20	11	31	53	6	2	1	3	2
2019–20	Jokerit	KHL	53	5	18	23	18	4	0	1	1	2
2020–21	Jokerit	KHL	46	7	16	23	34	—	—	—	—	—
2021–22	Jokerit	KHL	43	3	10	13	12	—	—	—	—	—
SHL totals			254	38	64	102	64	52	12	14	26	20
KHL totals			303	50	83	133	177	26	6	4	10	14

=== International ===
Year	Team	Event	Result	GP	G	A	Pts	PIM
2016	Sweden	WC	6th	8	0	1	1	2
2018	Sweden	OG	5th	3	0	0	0	2
Senior totals				11	0	1	1	4
