= Joey Crabb =

American ice hockey player (born 1983)

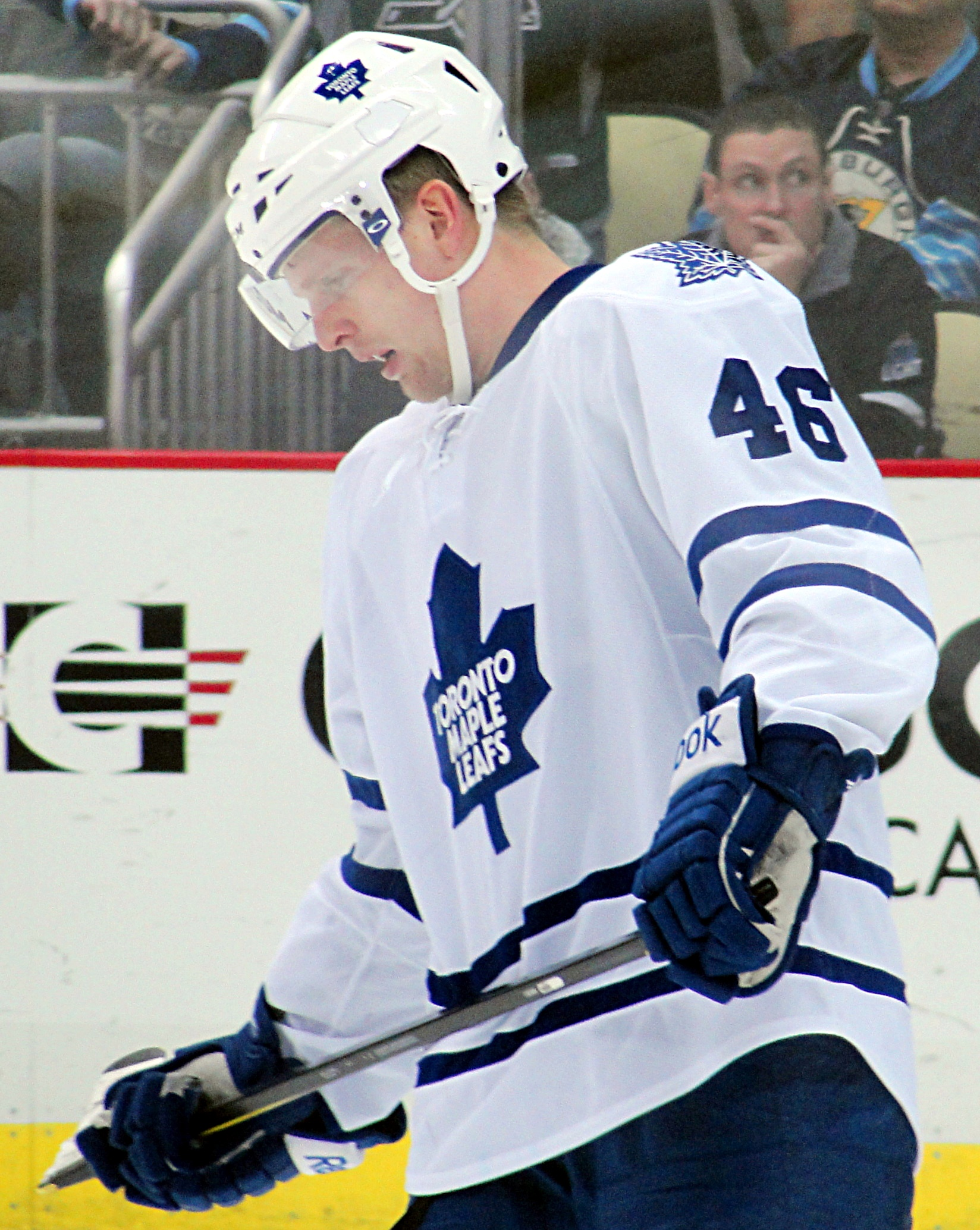
- Crabb with the Toronto Maple Leafs in 2012
- Born: April 3, 1983 (age 43) Anchorage, Alaska, U.S.
- Height: 6 ft 1 in (185 cm)
- Weight: 190 lb (86 kg; 13 st 8 lb)
- Position: Right wing
- Shot: Right
- Played for: Atlanta Thrashers; Toronto Maple Leafs; Washington Capitals; Florida Panthers; Växjö Lakers HC; Frölunda HC
- National team: United States
- NHL draft: 226th overall, 2002; New York Rangers
- Playing career: 2006–2016

Joseph Michael Crabb (born April 3, 1983), is an American former professional ice hockey winger who played in the National Hockey League (NHL) with the Atlanta Thrashers, Toronto Maple Leafs, Washington Capitals and Florida Panthers.

== Playing career ==
Previously, Crabb played for Colorado College of the Western Collegiate Hockey Association (WCHA), the Chicago Wolves of the American Hockey League (AHL), and the Toronto Maple Leafs and Atlanta Thrashers (NHL). He scored his first NHL goal on December 10, 2008 in a game against the New York Rangers.

On June 24, 2010, Crabb was traded by the Thrashers to the Chicago Blackhawks as part of a deal that sent the Thrashers' first (24th overall) and second round picks in the 2010 NHL entry draft as well as Marty Reasoner, Crabb and Jeremy Morin to Chicago in exchange for Dustin Byfuglien, Brent Sopel, Ben Eager and Akim Aliu. However, he signed a contract with the Toronto Maple Leafs on the first day of free agency, July 1, 2010. Crabb started the 2010–11 season with the Toronto Marlies of the American Hockey League but was frequently called up to the Maple Leafs, playing a total of 48 games that season.

On July 2, 2012, Crabb signed a one-year contract with the Washington Capitals.

During the 2012-13 NHL lockout, Crabb played for the Alaska Aces of the ECHL, and returned to Washington at the end of the lockout.

On March 22, 2013, Crabb was placed on waivers by the Washington Capitals and assigned to play for the Hershey Bears of the American Hockey League.

On July 5, 2013 Crabb signed a two-year contract with the Florida Panthers.

Prior to the 2014–15 season, on October 6, 2014, Crabb was traded by the Panthers to the New York Rangers in exchange for Steven Kampfer and Andrew Yogan. Having passed through waivers he was assigned to AHL affiliate, the Hartford Wolf Pack for the duration of the year, contributing with 28 points in 66 games. In the post-season, Crabb elevated his play and posted 10 points in 15 games.

As a free agent from the Rangers, Crabb went unsigned over the summer, before accepting an invite to the Arizona Coyotes training camp on September 16, 2015. His stay with the Coyotes was brief as he was released upon the completion of camp on September 21. On October 7, 2015, Crabb opted to sign his first contract abroad, agreeing to a one-year deal with Swedish club, Växjö Lakers HC. In the 2015–16 season, Crabb appeared in 31 games with the Lakers before opting to transfer to fellow SHL club, Frölunda HC on February 1, 2016. He helped the Indians, to play in 14 post-season games for 7 points in claiming their fourth Le Mat Trophy in Franchise history.

At the conclusion of his 10th professional season, Crabb announced his retirement from the game. He initially joined hometown collegiate program, Alaska Anchorage Seawolves, as a volunteer assistant coach.

== Career statistics ==
=== Regular season and playoffs ===
			Regular season					Playoffs
Season	Team	League	GP	G	A	Pts	PIM	GP	G	A	Pts	PIM
1998–99	Dimond High School	HSAK
1999–2000	US NTDP U18	NAHL	55	13	10	23	69	3	1	0	1	4
2000–01	US NTDP Juniors	USDP	39	10	10	20	22	—	—	—	—	—
2000–01	US NTDP Juniors	USHL	21	2	3	5	18	—	—	—	—	—
2001–02	Green Bay Gamblers	USHL	61	15	27	42	94	7	4	8	12	21
2002–03	Colorado College	WCHA	35	4	4	8	40	—	—	—	—	—
2003–04	Colorado College	WCHA	39	15	12	27	20	—	—	—	—	—
2004–05	Colorado College	WCHA	42	16	15	31	40	—	—	—	—	—
2005–06	Colorado College	WCHA	42	18	25	43	45	—	—	—	—	—
2006–07	Chicago Wolves	AHL	63	7	15	22	25	6	0	0	0	0
2007–08	Chicago Wolves	AHL	72	9	26	35	78	24	1	4	5	20
2008–09	Chicago Wolves	AHL	42	15	14	29	62	—	—	—	—	—
2008–09	Atlanta Thrashers	NHL	29	4	5	9	28	—	—	—	—	—
2009–10	Chicago Wolves	AHL	79	24	29	53	59	14	6	5	11	12
2010–11	Toronto Marlies	AHL	34	11	7	18	31	—	—	—	—	—
2010–11	Toronto Maple Leafs	NHL	48	3	12	15	24	—	—	—	—	—
2011–12	Toronto Marlies	AHL	9	7	8	15	7	—	—	—	—	—
2011–12	Toronto Maple Leafs	NHL	67	11	15	26	33	—	—	—	—	—
2012–13	Alaska Aces	ECHL	35	17	21	38	56	—	—	—	—	—
2012–13	Washington Capitals	NHL	26	2	0	2	8	—	—	—	—	—
2012–13	Hershey Bears	AHL	12	6	6	12	6	5	5	0	5	5
2013–14	Florida Panthers	NHL	9	0	1	1	7	—	—	—	—	—
2013–14	San Antonio Rampage	AHL	62	15	14	29	51	—	—	—	—	—
2014–15	Hartford Wolf Pack	AHL	66	12	16	28	40	15	6	4	10	8
2015–16	Växjö Lakers	SHL	31	4	6	10	60	—	—	—	—	—
2015–16	Frölunda HC	SHL	10	1	3	4	2	14	5	2	7	14
AHL totals			439	106	135	241	359	64	18	13	31	42
NHL totals			179	20	33	53	100	—	—	—	—	—

=== International ===
Year	Team	Event	Result	GP	G	A	Pts	PIM
2000	United States	U17	4th	6	0	1	1	0
2001	United States	WJC18	6th	6	5	2	7	2
2012	United States	WC	7th	8	0	3	3	4
Junior totals				12	5	3	8	2
Senior totals				8	0	3	3	4
