= Martin Lundberg =

Swedish ice hockey player

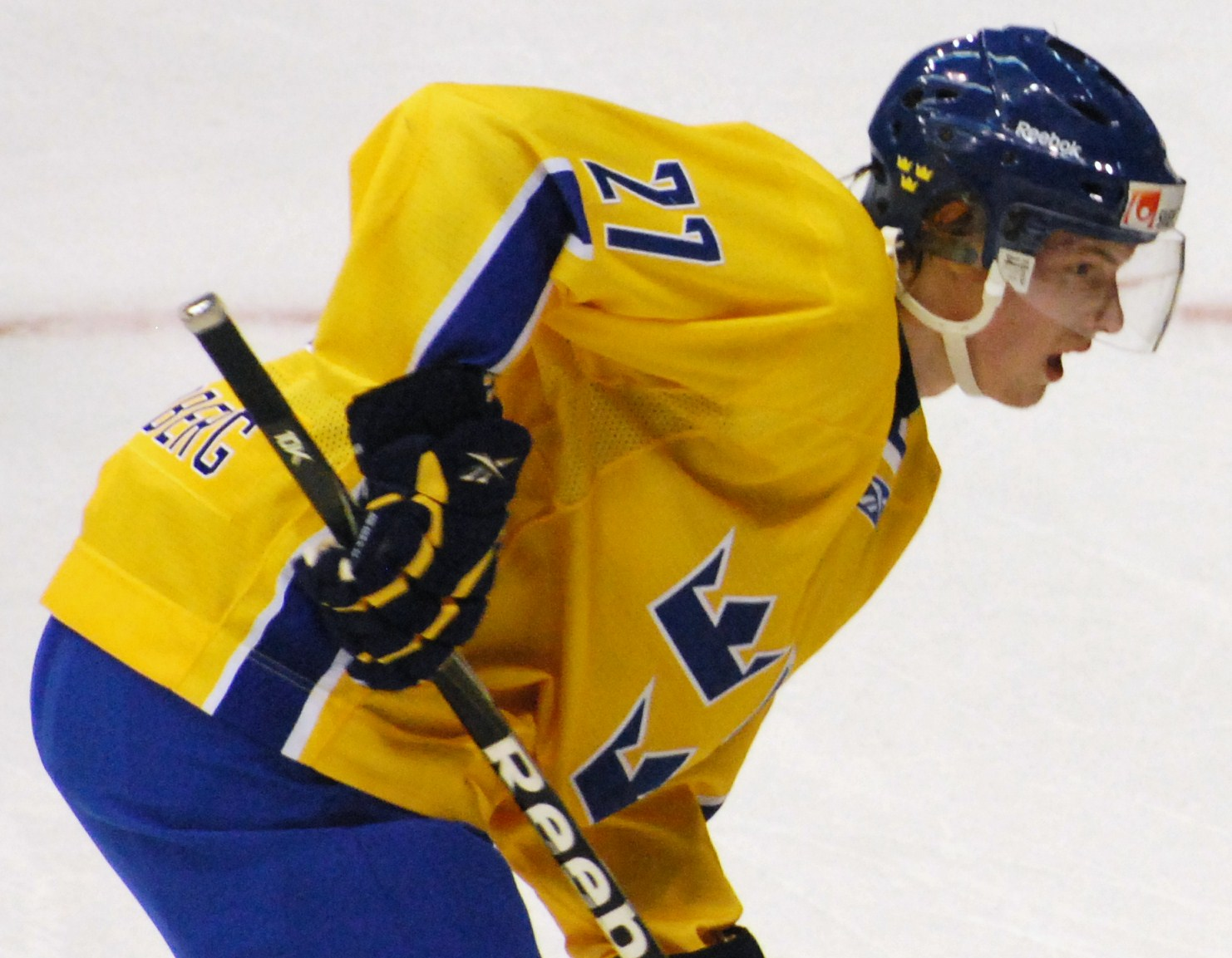
- Born: 7 June 1990 (age 36) Skellefteå, Sweden
- Height: 183 cm (6 ft 0 in)
- Weight: 93 kg (205 lb; 14 st 9 lb)
- Position: Center
- Shoots: Left
- SHL team Former teams: Skellefteå AIK; Rockford IceHogs; Växjö Lakers
- National team: Sweden
- NHL draft: Undrafted
- Playing career: 2007–present

Martin Lundberg (born 7 June 1990) is a Swedish professional ice hockey player who is currently playing with Skellefteå AIK in the Swedish Hockey League (SHL).

== Playing career ==
Born and bred in Skellefteå, Lundberg came through the youth ranks of local club Skellefteå AIK and logged his first minutes in the country's top-tier Swedish Hockey League (SHL) during the 2007–08 season. He became a regular on Skellefteå's senior squad the following season. In 2013 and 2014, he won the SHL championship with the club and lost in the finals in 2011, 2012, 2015 and 2016.

On 24 May 2016, he was handed a one-year contract by the Chicago Blackhawks of the National Hockey League (NHL). After attending the Blackhawks 2016 training camp, Lundberg was re-assigned to American Hockey League affiliate, the Rockford IceHogs on 3 October 2016. In the 2016–17 season with the IceHogs, Lundberg contributed his physical presence with 9 goals and 21 points in 67 games while being unable to earn a recall to the NHL with Chicago.

As an impending free agent, Lundberg opted to return to Sweden in agreeing to a two-year contract with Växjö Lakers of the SHL on 5 May 2017.

== Career statistics ==
=== Regular season and playoffs ===
			Regular season					Playoffs
Season	Team	League	GP	G	A	Pts	PIM	GP	G	A	Pts	PIM
2006–07	Skellefteå AIK	J20	24	4	5	9	22	2	1	0	1	2
2007–08	Skellefteå AIK	J20	34	4	12	16	64	2	1	1	2	4
2007–08	Skellefteå AIK	SEL	11	0	1	1	2	—	—	—	—	—
2008–09	Skellefteå AIK	J20	7	3	5	8	16	3	0	0	0	2
2008–09	Skellefteå AIK	SEL	47	1	1	2	12	1	0	0	0	0
2009–10	Skellefteå AIK	J20	3	1	1	2	2	—	—	—	—	—
2009–10	Skellefteå AIK	SEL	46	0	4	4	67	12	0	3	3	0
2010–11	Skellefteå AIK	SEL	52	4	7	11	55	17	0	1	1	4
2011–12	Skellefteå AIK	SEL	45	0	4	4	22	17	0	1	1	35
2012–13	Skellefteå AIK	SEL	53	5	2	7	53	13	0	1	1	10
2013–14	Skellefteå AIK	SHL	55	4	3	7	40	14	1	3	4	8
2014–15	Skellefteå AIK	SHL	49	8	7	15	22	15	1	3	4	6
2015–16	Skellefteå AIK	SHL	44	13	8	21	22	16	4	2	6	8
2016–17	Rockford IceHogs	AHL	67	9	12	21	30	—	—	—	—	—
2017–18	Växjö Lakers	SHL	45	6	6	12	18	13	0	1	1	14
2018–19	Växjö Lakers	SHL	14	0	1	1	6	—	—	—	—	—
2019–20	Växjö Lakers	SHL	39	6	4	10	72	—	—	—	—	—
2020–21	Växjö Lakers	SHL	50	5	2	7	45	14	0	0	0	27
2021–22	Växjö Lakers	SHL	45	8	8	16	41	3	0	0	0	2
2022–23	Växjö Lakers	SHL	43	5	5	10	26	14	2	2	4	6
2023–24	Växjö Lakers	SHL	43	6	6	12	13	8	0	2	2	4
2024–25	Växjö Lakers	SHL	3	0	0	0	0	8	3	2	5	4
SHL totals			684	71	69	140	516	165	11	21	32	128

=== International ===
Year	Team	Event	Result	GP	G	A	Pts	PIM
2008	Sweden	U18	4th	6	1	1	2	8
2010	Sweden	WJC	3rd place, bronze medalist(s)	5	0	2	2	4
2016	Sweden	WC	6th	8	2	0	2	4
Junior totals				11	1	3	4	12
Senior totals				8	2	0	2	4

== Awards and honours ==
Award	Year
SHL
Le Mat Trophy (Skellefteå AIK)	2013, 2014
Le Mat Trophy (Växjö Lakers)	2018, 2021, 2023
