= Kalle Olsson (ice hockey) =

Swedish ice hockey player

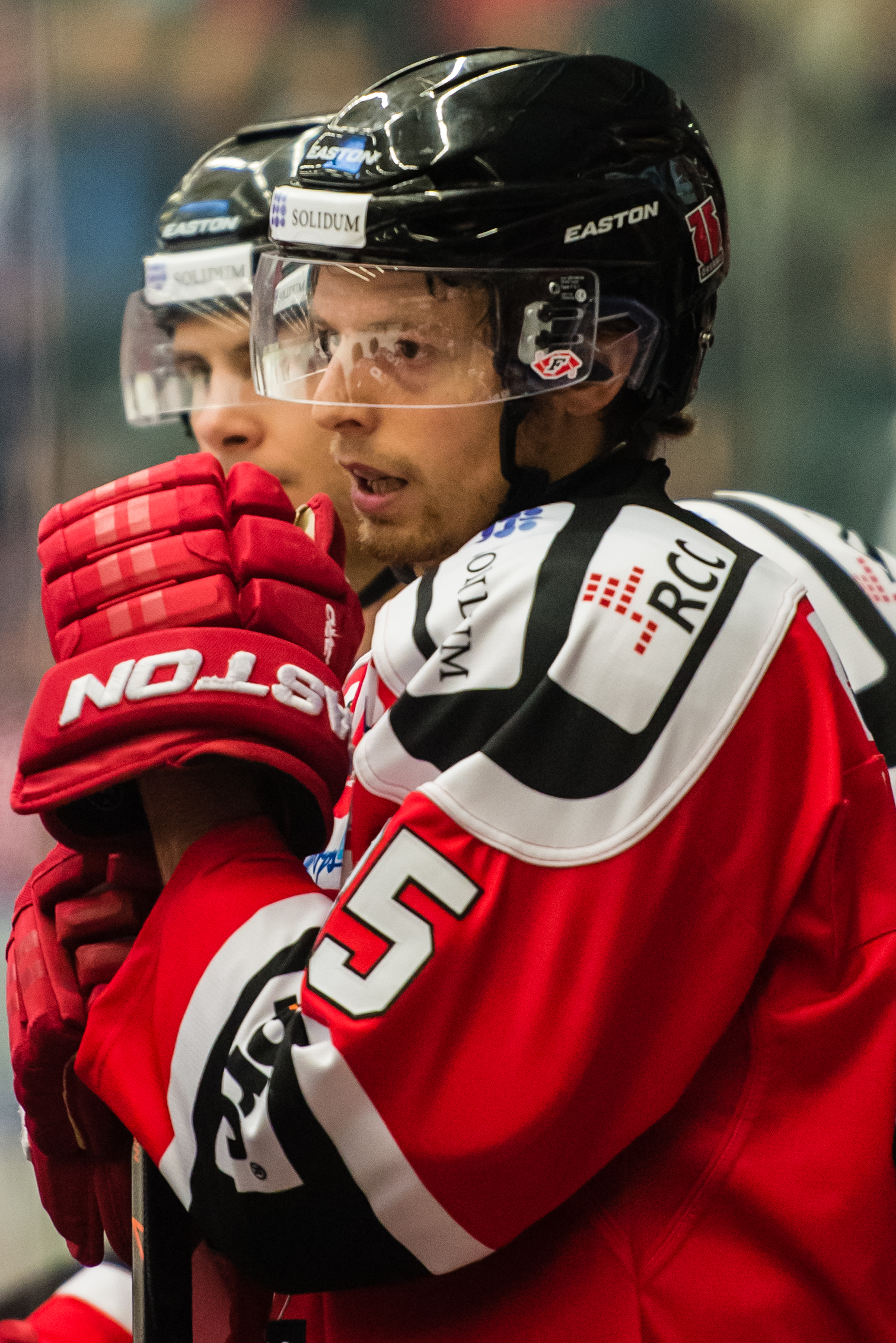
- Born: January 31, 1985 (age 41) Munkedal, Sweden
- Height: 6 ft 0 in (183 cm)
- Weight: 185 lb (84 kg; 13 st 3 lb)
- Position: Forward
- Shot: Left
- Played for: Frölunda HC; Linköpings HC; Örebro HK
- NHL draft: 147th overall, 2003; Edmonton Oilers
- Playing career: 2003–2019

Kalle Olsson (born January 31, 1985) is a Swedish former professional ice hockey player. He most notably played for Örebro HK in the Swedish Hockey League (SHL). Olsson was selected by the Edmonton Oilers in the fifth round, 147th overall, of the 2003 NHL entry draft.

Olsson has previously played in the SHL with Frölunda HC and Linköpings HC.

== Career statistics ==
=== Regular season and playoffs ===
| | | | Regular season | | | | | Playoffs |
| Season | Team | League | GP | G | A | Pts | PIM | GP | G | A | Pts | PIM |
|---|---|---|---|---|---|---|---|---|---|---|---|---|
| 2001–02 | Västra Frölunda HC | J18 Allsv | 1 | 0 | 0 | 0 | 2 | 3 | 1 | 3 | 4 | 2 |
| 2001–02 | Västra Frölunda HC | J20 | 34 | 10 | 10 | 20 | 8 | 5 | 0 | 2 | 2 | 2 |
| 2002–03 | Västra Frölunda HC | J20 | 30 | 22 | 13 | 35 | 18 | 5 | 4 | 2 | 6 | 4 |
| 2002–03 | Västra Frölunda HC | J18 Allsv | — | — | — | — | — | 1 | 0 | 1 | 1 | 0 |
| 2003–04 | Västra Frölunda HC | J20 | 30 | 13 | 13 | 26 | 28 | 5 | 2 | 1 | 3 | 2 |
| 2003–04 | Västra Frölunda HC | SEL | 4 | 1 | 0 | 1 | 0 | 2 | 0 | 0 | 0 | 0 |
| 2004–05 | Frölunda HC | J20 | 33 | 15 | 16 | 31 | 50 | 6 | 2 | 2 | 4 | 0 |
| 2004–05 | Frölunda HC | SEL | 1 | 0 | 0 | 0 | 2 | — | — | — | — | — |
| 2004–05 | Växjö Lakers HC | Allsv | 2 | 0 | 1 | 1 | 0 | — | — | — | — | — |
| 2005–06 | VIK Västerås HK | Allsv | 40 | 10 | 5 | 15 | 14 | — | — | — | — | — |
| 2006–07 | VIK Västerås HK | Allsv | 44 | 16 | 15 | 31 | 20 | 2 | 0 | 2 | 2 | 0 |
| 2007–08 | VIK Västerås HK | Allsv | 45 | 19 | 21 | 40 | 44 | 10 | 5 | 1 | 6 | 2 |
| 2008–09 | VIK Västerås HK | Allsv | 43 | 6 | 12 | 18 | 22 | 9 | 3 | 1 | 4 | 6 |
| 2009–10 | VIK Västerås HK | Allsv | 50 | 11 | 13 | 24 | 16 | — | — | — | — | — |
| 2010–11 | VIK Västerås HK | Allsv | 51 | 10 | 14 | 24 | 12 | 6 | 0 | 3 | 3 | 6 |
| 2011–12 | Linköpings HC | SEL | 51 | 3 | 4 | 7 | 20 | — | — | — | — | — |
| 2012–13 | Örebro HK | Allsv | 51 | 15 | 21 | 36 | 14 | 12 | 5 | 6 | 11 | 4 |
| 2013–14 | Örebro HK | SHL | 51 | 2 | 10 | 12 | 12 | — | — | — | — | — |
| 2014–15 | Örebro HK | SHL | 43 | 5 | 8 | 13 | 8 | 6 | 1 | 1 | 2 | 2 |
| 2014–15 | HC Vita Hästen | Allsv | 3 | 0 | 0 | 0 | 0 | — | — | — | — | — |
| 2015–16 | Örebro HK | SHL | 46 | 6 | 9 | 15 | 12 | 2 | 1 | 1 | 2 | 0 |
| 2016–17 | Örebro HK | SHL | 45 | 6 | 10 | 16 | 8 | — | — | — | — | — |
| 2017–18 | Örebro HK | SHL | 39 | 4 | 3 | 7 | 10 | — | — | — | — | — |
| 2018–19 | Örebro HK | SHL | 35 | 1 | 3 | 4 | 8 | — | — | — | — | — |
| SHL totals | | | 315 | 28 | 47 | 75 | 80 | 10 | 2 | 2 | 4 | 2 |
| Allsv totals | | | 329 | 87 | 102 | 189 | 142 | 39 | 13 | 13 | 26 | 18 |

=== International ===
| Year | Team | Event | Result | GP | G | A | Pts | PIM |
|---|---|---|---|---|---|---|---|---|
| 2002 | Sweden | U18 | 8th | 5 | 1 | 1 | 2 | 0 |
| 2003 | Sweden | WJC18 | 5th | 6 | 0 | 1 | 1 | 6 |
| 2005 | Sweden | WJC | 6th | 6 | 0 | 3 | 3 | 4 |
| Junior totals | | | | 17 | 1 | 5 | 6 | 10 |
