= Jonas Junland =

Swedish ice hockey player

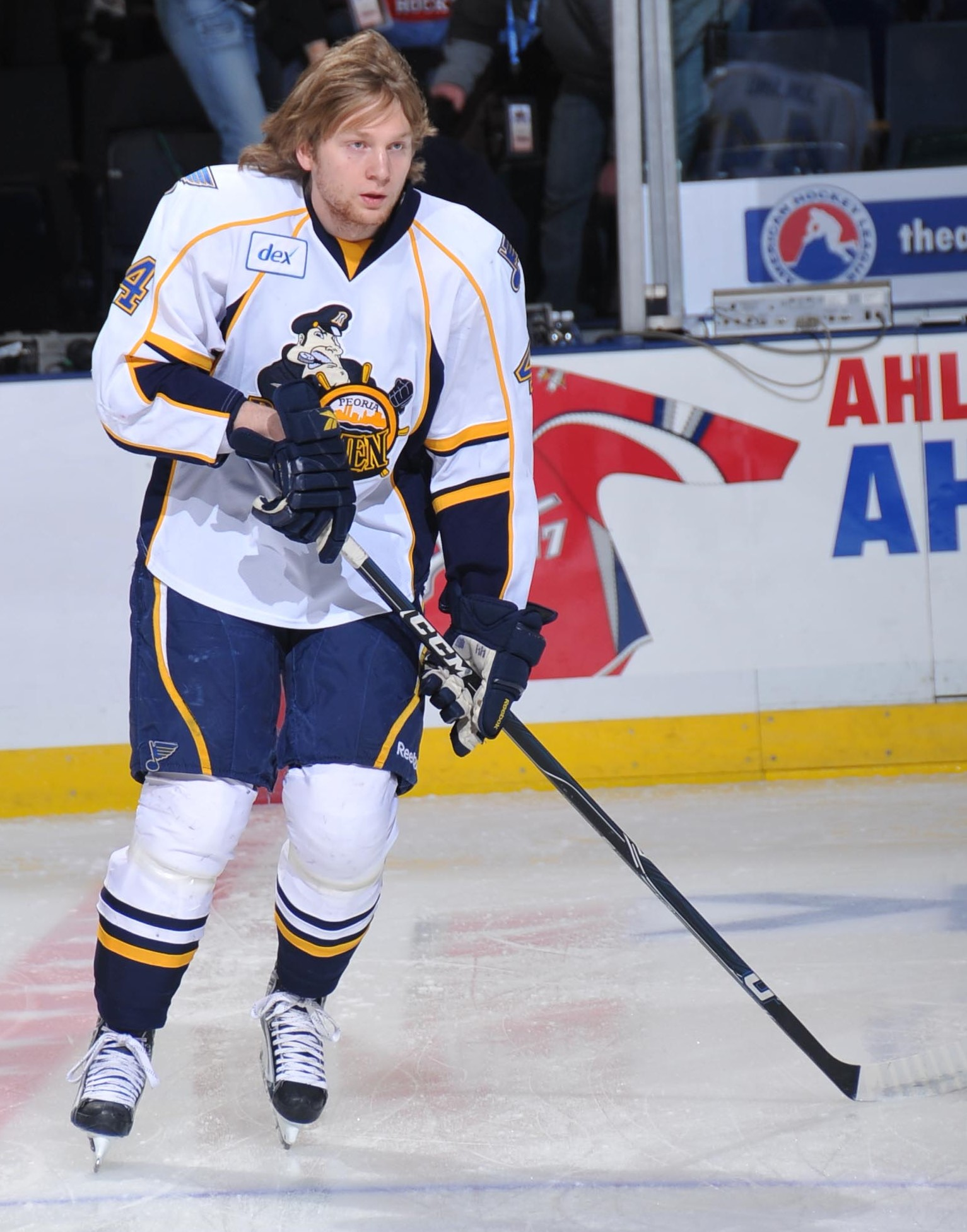
- Born: November 15, 1987 (age 39) Linköping, Sweden
- Height: 6 ft 2 in (188 cm)
- Weight: 198 lb (90 kg; 14 st 2 lb)
- Position: Defence
- Shot: Left
- Played for: St. Louis Blues; Färjestads BK; Barys Astana; Lahti Pelicans; Lausanne HC; Linköping HC
- NHL draft: 64th overall, 2006; St. Louis Blues
- Playing career: 2005–2023

Jonas Anders Vilhelm Junland (born November 15, 1987) is a Swedish former professional ice hockey defenceman who last played for Linköping HC of the Swedish Hockey League (SHL).

== Playing career ==
Junland was drafted 64th overall in the 2006 NHL entry draft by the St. Louis Blues. Junland played junior with Linköpings HC before making his professional debut in the Elitserien in the 2005–06 season.

On June 1, 2007, Junland signed a three-year entry-level contract with the Blues. In his first North American season in 2008–09 he was assigned to the Blues AHL affiliate, the Peoria Rivermen and was named to the Planet USA All-Star Team at the AHL All-Star Game. He made his NHL debut on December 18, 2008 against the Washington Capitals in a 4-2 defeat. In the 2009–10 season, Junland was again named an AHL All-Star with the Rivermen. He recorded his first NHL points, both assists, in a 6-3 victory over the Anaheim Ducks on April 9, 2010.

Although still holding NHL aspirations, on April 29, 2010, Junland signed a one-year contract to return to the Elitserien with Färjestads BK.

After the beginning of the 2012–13 season, Junland was granted a release by Barys Astana of the Kontinental Hockey League and immediately joined Finnish club, Lahti Pelicans of the SM-liiga, for the remainder of the year on October 4, 2012. In 2013, he returned to his hometown team Linköpings HC, where he spent the following three seasons.

On March 5, 2016, he signed a two-year contract with Lausanne HC of the NLA. He received NLA Regular Season Defenceman of the Year honors in 2016–17. Junland's final years in Lausanne were awful; he struggled to keep up with the pace of the NL and ended up being a healthy scratch even though the team had only 4 import players on the roster. On January 13, 2020, Lausanne released Junland from his contract. He later returned to his original Swedish club, Linköping HC.

== Career statistics ==
=== Regular season and playoffs ===
			Regular season					Playoffs
Season	Team	League	GP	G	A	Pts	PIM	GP	G	A	Pts	PIM
2002–03	Linköpings HC	J18 Allsv	7	0	0	0	6	—	—	—	—	—
2003–04	Linköpings HC	J18 Allsv	4	0	0	0	4	—	—	—	—	—
2003–04	Linköpings HC	J20	16	1	0	1	10	—	—	—	—	—
2004–05	Linköpings HC	J18	11	6	5	11	35	—	—	—	—	—
2004–05	Linköpings HC	J20	32	3	5	8	96	—	—	—	—	—
2005–06	Linköpings HC	J18	1	5	0	5	2	—	—	—	—	—
2005–06	Linköpings HC	J20	32	17	23	40	44	—	—	—	—	—
2005–06	Linköpings HC	SEL	4	0	0	0	0	—	—	—	—	—
2006–07	Linköpings HC	J20	9	6	7	13	26	—	—	—	—	—
2006–07	Linköpings HC	SEL	41	1	4	5	22	15	0	5	5	20
2006–07	IK Oskarshamn	Allsv	4	0	3	3	4	—	—	—	—	—
2007–08	Linköpings HC	SEL	52	3	17	20	42	16	4	3	7	18
2008–09	Peoria Rivermen	AHL	70	13	18	31	52	5	0	1	1	6
2008–09	St. Louis Blues	NHL	1	0	0	0	2	—	—	—	—	—
2009–10	Peoria Rivermen	AHL	74	14	30	44	49	—	—	—	—	—
2009–10	St. Louis Blues	NHL	3	0	2	2	0	—	—	—	—	—
2010–11	Färjestads BK	SEL	41	5	17	22	18	14	3	3	6	12
2011–12	Barys Astana	KHL	46	4	11	15	30	7	1	1	2	6
2012–13	Barys Astana	KHL	3	0	0	0	10	—	—	—	—	—
2012–13	Pelicans	SM-liiga	5	1	1	2	6	—	—	—	—	—
2013–14	Linköpings HC	SHL	44	6	7	13	46	10	2	2	4	8
2014–15	Linköpings HC	SHL	55	9	22	31	32	11	2	7	9	4
2015–16	Linköpings HC	SHL	51	5	25	30	36	6	2	0	2	2
2016–17	Lausanne HC	NLA	47	8	31	39	38	4	0	0	0	4
2017–18	Lausanne HC	NL	46	8	26	34	32	—	—	—	—	—
2018–19	Lausanne HC	NL	31	3	23	26	18	12	0	7	7	18
2019–20	Lausanne HC	NL	28	3	10	13	12	—	—	—	—	—
2019–20	Linköping HC	SHL	13	0	3	3	10	—	—	—	—	—
2020–21	Linköping HC	SHL	51	9	21	30	38	—	—	—	—	—
2021–22	Linköping HC	SHL	41	2	26	28	19	—	—	—	—	—
2022–23	Linköping HC	SHL	49	4	10	14	50	—	—	—	—	—
SHL totals			442	44	152	196	313	72	13	20	33	64
NHL totals			4	0	2	2	2	—	—	—	—	—
NL totals			152	22	90	112	100	16	0	7	7	22

=== International ===
Year	Team	Event	Result	GP	G	A	Pts	PIM
2007	Sweden	WJC	4th	7	1	1	2	18
Junior totals				7	1	1	2	18
