= Adam Byström Johansson =

Swedish ice hockey player (born 1996)

- Born: March 2, 1996 (age 30) Munkfors, Sweden
- Height: 5 ft 10 in (178 cm)
- Weight: 170 lb (77 kg; 12 st 2 lb)
- Position: Right wing
- Shoots: Right
- SHL team: Växjö Lakers
- NHL draft: Undrafted
- Playing career: 2013–present

Adam Byström Johansson (born March 2, 1996) is a Swedish ice hockey player. He currently plays with Växjö Lakers of the Swedish Hockey League (SHL).

Johansson made his Swedish Hockey League debut playing with Växjö Lakers during the 2013–14 SHL season.
