= List of indoor ice rinks in Norway =

Norway has forty-five indoor ice hockey rinks and four indoor speed skating rinks. The speed skating rinks are Vikingskipet, Fosenhallen, Sørmarka Arena and Arena Nordvest.

== Current rinks ==
Venue	Municipality	Home for	Tournaments	Opened	Capacity	Seats	Rinks	Ref
Arena Nordvest	Kristiansund Municipality	—	—	2018			1	
Askerhallen	Asker Municipality	Frisk Tigers	—	1969	2,400	1,342	1	
Bergenshallen	Bergen Municipality	Bergen	—	1968	3,000	1,800	1	
Bugården Ishall	Sandefjord Municipality	—	—	2018			1	
Bærum Ishall	Bærum Municipality	Jutul	—	1993	315	15	1	
CC Amfi	Hamar Municipality	Storhamar Hockey	1994 Winter Olympics; 1999 IIHF World Championship	1992	7,000	7,000	1	
Dalgård Ishall	Trondheim Municipality	Astor	—	1989	1,050	400	1	
DNB Arena	Stavanger Municipality	Stavanger Oilers	—	2012	4,500	—	1	
Eidsiva Arena	Lillehammer Municipality	Lillehammer	—	1988	3,195	1,695	1	
Fosenhallen	Ørland Municipality	—	—	2007			1	
Furuset Forum	Oslo Municipality	Furuset; Vålerenga(2017-2020)	—	1988	2,050		1	
Gjøvik Olympic Cavern Hall	Gjøvik Municipality	Gjøvik	1994 Winter Olympics	1993	6,000	5,080	1	
Grünerhallen	Oslo Municipality	Grüner	—	1995	600	200	1	
Halden Ishall	Halden Municipality	Comet Halden	—	1987	2,200	1,200	1	
Haugesund Ishall	Haugesund Municipality	Haugesund Seagulls	—	2010			1	
Holmen Ishall	Asker Municipality	Holmen	—	1989	550	350	1	
Håkons Hall	Lillehammer Municipality	—	1994 Winter Olympics; 1999 IIHF World Championship	1993	9,000	9,770	1	
Idda Arena	Kristiansand Municipality	Kristiansand	—	2011			1	
Iskanten Ishall	Bergen Municipality	Lyderhorn Gladiators	—	2007			1	
Jar Isforum	Bærum Municipality	Jar	—	2013			1	
Jessheim Ishall	Ullensaker Municipality	Ullensaker Flyers	—	2014			1	
Kongsberghallen	Kongsberg Municipality	Kongsberg IF	—	1988	5,500	2,200	1	
Kongsvinger Ishall	Kongsvinger Municipality	Kongsvinger Knights	—	2013	2,000	0	1	
Leangen Ishall	Trondheim Municipality	Nidaros; Rosenborg; Trondheim Black Panthers (defunct)	—	1977	1,900	300	2	
Lørenhallen	Oslo Municipality	Hasle–Løren	—	1986	1,500	50	1	
Lørenskog Ishall	Lørenskog Municipality	Lørenskog	—	1988	1,350	1,350	1	
Manglerudhallen	Oslo Municipality	Manglerud Star	—	1979	2,000	980	1	
Moss Ishall	Moss Municipality	Moss	—	2008			1	
Nordkraft Arena	Narvik Municipality	Narvik	—	2011	1,000		1	
Nye Loen	Hå Municipality	Nærbø	—	2007			1	
Oslofjord Arena	Sandefjord Municipality	—	—	2019	2,000		1	
Oslo Spektrum	Oslo Municipality	Vålerenga(1990-1993); Spektrum Flyers (defunct)	—	1990	6,500	6,500	1	
Rendalen Ishall	Rendalen Municipality	—	—	2007			1	
Runnirinken Ishall	Nes Municipality	Nes	—	1987	700	600	1	
Schjonghallen	Ringerike Municipality	Ringerike Panthers	—	1990	600	0	1	
Skedsmo Ishall	Indre Østfold Municipality	Skedsmo	—	1987	500	0	1	
Ski Ishall	Nordre Follo Municipality	Ski	—	1987	600	0	1	
Skien Fritidspark	Skien Municipality	Skien	—	2005	1,100	1,650	1	
Sørmarka Arena	Stavanger Municipality	—	—	2010			1	
Sparta Amfi	Sarpsborg Municipality	Sparta Warriors	—	1963	3,707	1,572	2	
Stavanger Dobbelthall	Stavanger Municipality	—	—	2012			2	
Siddishallen	Stavanger Municipality	—	—	1968	2,582	1,382	2	
Stjernehallen	Fredrikstad Municipality	Stjernen	—	1970	1,453	2,473	1	
Storhamar Ishall	Hamar Municipality	—	—	1981	1,200	0	1	
Tromsø Ishall	Tromsø Municipality	Tromsø	—	2010			1	
Tønsberg Ishall	Tønsberg Municipality	Tønsberg Vikings	—	1995	500	500	1	
Vikingskipet	Hamar Municipality	—	1994 Winter Olympics	1993	10,600	2,000		
Vinterbro Ishall	Ås Municipality	—	—	2014			1	

== Future rinks ==
Venue	Municipality	Home for	Tournaments	Opening	Capacity	Seats	Rinks	Ref
Nye Jordal Amfi	Oslo Municipality	Vålerenga		2020	5,500	5,300	2	
Sonja Henie Ishall	Oslo Municipality		—	2020	300	300	1	
Risenga Ishall	Asker Municipality	Frisk Tigers	—	2021	3,650	3,150	1	
Arena Nord	Bergen Municipality		—	2021			1	

== Former rinks ==
Venue	Municipality	Home for	Tournaments	Opened	Demolished	Capacity	Seats	Rinks	Ref
Furuset Ishall	Oslo Municipality	Furuset	—	1979	1988			1	
Jordal Amfi	Oslo Municipality	Vålerenga	1952 Winter Olympics; 1958 World Ice Hockey Championships; 1999 IIHF World Championship	1971	2017	4,550	3,078	2	
Kongshallen	Kongsvinger Municipality	Kongsvinger Knights	—	1992	2013	550	0	1	

== Notes ==
1. Speed skating venue with ice hockey rink.
2. A second ice hockey rink was added in 2013.
3. A second ice hockey rink was added in 2009.
4. A second ice hockey rink was added in 2007.
5. A second ice hockey rink was added in 1974.
6. A second ice hockey rink was added in 1989, to the original Jordal Amfi.
