= 2016–17 Norwegian First Division (ice hockey) =

2016–17 First Division season
- League: (Norway) Norwegian First Division
- Sport: Ice hockey
- Duration: 21 September 2016 – 23 March 2017
- Number of games: 36
- Number of teams: 10

Regular season
- League champions: Nidaros

Playoffs

Seasons
- ← 2015–16 2017–18 →

The 2016–17 First Division was the 27th season of Norway's second highest ice hockey league, First Division.

The regular season began play on September 21, 2016, and was concluded on February 26, 2017.

The promotional and relegation playoffs began March 5, and ended March 23, 2017.

== Participating teams ==
Team	City	Arena	Capacity
Bergen	Bergen	Bergenshallen	3,000
Comet	Halden	Halden Ishall	2,200
Furuset	Oslo	Furuset Forum	1,498
Gjøvik	Gjøvik	Gjøvik Olympic Cavern Hall	5,500
Grüner	Oslo	Grünerhallen	500
Hasle-Løren	Oslo	Lørenhallen	1,500
Moss	Moss	Moss Ishall	500
Narvik	Narvik	Nordkraft Arena	1,000
Nidaros	Trondheim	Leangen Ishall	3,000
Ringerike Panthers	Hønefoss	Schjongshallen	600

=== Team changes ===
- Nes withdrew from the national league system in July 2016, following failure to meet league requirements. The vacant spot was given to Furuset.
- Due to struggling economy, the board of the Tønsberg Vikings withdraw from the league in August 2016. The vacant spot was given to Gjøvik.

== Regular season ==
=== Standings ===
Updated as of February 26, 2017.

2016–17 season	GP	W	L	OTW	OTL	GF	GA	+/–	Pts
Nidaros^{y}	36	25	6	4	1	159	86	+73	84
Comet^{x}	36	20	6	4	6	157	97	+60	76
Ringerike Panthers	36	21	9	4	2	158	96	+62	73
Hasle-Løren	36	19	10	6	1	158	113	+45	70
Bergen	36	19	13	3	1	156	128	+28	64
Narvik	36	17	12	2	5	151	137	+14	60
Grüner	36	14	13	3	6	145	130	+15	54
Furuset	36	9	20	3	4	109	155	-46	37
Gjøvik^{r}	36	3	28	1	4	74	170	-96	15
Moss^{r}	36	1	31	0	4	81	236	-155	7

x – clinched promotional playoff spot; y – clinched regular season league title; r – play in relegation series

Source: scoreboard.com

== Playoffs ==
=== Promotional Playoffs ===
After the regular season ends, the two lowest ranked teams in the 2016–17 GET-ligaen and the two highest ranked teams in the First Division will compete for the right to play in the 2017–18 GET-ligaen. The tournament will be organized according to a double round robin format, where each club will play the others twice, home and away, for a total of six games. The points system and ranking method used, is the same as in the regular season.

=== Standings ===
Updated as of March 23, 2017.

2017–18 GET-ligaen playoffs	GP	W	L	OTW	OTL	GF	GA	+/–	Pts
Manglerud Star^{q}	6	4	1	1	0	26	15	+11	14
Kongsvinger Knights^{q}	6	3	3	0	0	25	27	-2	9
Nidaros^{r}	6	2	3	0	1	19	20	-1	7
Comet^{r}	6	1	3	1	1	19	27	-8	6

q – qualified for next years GET-league; r – will play in next years 1. division

Source: hockey.no

=== Relegation Playoffs ===
After the regular season had ended, the two lowest ranked teams in the First Division and the two highest ranked teams in the Second Division competed for the right to play in the 2016–17 First Division. However, as second teams could not play in the First division, Storhamar 2 was ineligible to compete in the playoffs. The tournament was organized to be played over one weekend, where each club played the others once, for a total of two games. The points system and ranking method used, was the same as in the regular season. The games was played in Tønsberg Ishall.

==== Standings ====
Updated as of March 12, 2017.

2016–17 First Division playoffs	GP	W	L	D	GF	GA	+/–	Pts
Tønsberg^{q}	2	2	0	0	7	3	4	4
Gjøvik^{q}	2	1	1	0	3	4	-1	2
Moss^{r}	2	0	2	0	1	4	-3	0

q – will play in next years 1. division; r – will play in next years 2. division

Source: hockey.no
