= List of ice hockey teams in Norway =

This is a list of ice hockey teams in Norway, sorted for the 2015–16 season.

== Men ==
=== GET-ligaen ===
Team	City/Area	Arena	Capacity
Frisk Tigers	Asker	Askerhallen	2,400
Kongsvinger Knights	Kongsvinger	Kongsvinger Ishall	2,000
Lillehammer	Lillehammer	Kristins Hall	3,194
Manglerud Star	Oslo	Manglerudhallen	2,000
Sparta Warriors	Sarpsborg	Sparta Amfi	3,450
Stavanger Oilers	Stavanger	DNB Arena	4,500
Stjernen	Fredrikstad	Stjernehallen	2,473
Storhamar Dragons	Hamar	Hamar OL-Amfi	6,091
Vålerenga	Oslo	Jordal Amfi	4,450

Eliteserien teams

Source: pointstreak.com

=== First Division ===
- Bergen, Bergen
- Comet Halden, Halden
- Furuset, Oslo
- Grüner, Oslo
- Hasle/Løren, Oslo
- Moss, Moss
- Narvik, Narvik
- Nes, Nes
- Ringerike Panthers, Hønefoss
- Tønsberg Vikings, Tønsberg

Source: hockey.no

=== Second Division ===
- Gjøvik, Gjøvik
- Grüner 2, Oslo
- Haugesund Seagulls, Haugesund
- Jutul, Bærum
- Nidaros, Trondheim
- Prinsdalen Wheels, Oslo
- Ski Icehawks, Ski

Source: hockey.no

=== Third Division ===
==== West ====
- Forus/Sandnes, Sandnes
- Hafrsfjord Kings, Stavanger
- Kristiansand, Kristiansand
- Lyderhorn Gladiators, Bergen

Source: hockey.no

==== East, Group A ====
- Comet Halden 2, Halden
- Eiksmarka, Bærum
- Hasle/Løren 2, Oslo
- Holmen, Asker
- Nesøya, Asker
- Oppsal, Oslo
- Rasta, Lørenskog
- Tromsø, Tromsø

Source: hockey.no

==== East, Group B ====
- Gjøvik 2, Gjøvik
- Jar, Bærum
- Kongsberg, Kongsberg
- Kongsvinger Knights 2, Kongsvinger
- Ringerike Panthers 2, Hønefoss
- Skedsmo, Skedsmo
- Skien, Skien
- Ullensaker, Jessheim

Source: hockey.no

=== Fourth Division ===
==== Group A ====
- Aker Bulldogs, Oslo
- Bøler, Oslo
- Forward Flyers, Oslo
- Grüner 3, Oslo
- Nes 2, Nes
- Nordstrand, Oslo
- Ski Icehawks 2, Ski

Source: hockey.no

==== Group B ====
- Eiksmarka 2, Bærum
- Gamle Oslo, Oslo
- Hasle/Løren 3, Oslo
- Jar 2, Bærum
- Jordal, Oslo
- Rosenhoff, Oslo
- Skedsmo 2, Skedsmo
- Ullensaker 2, Jessheim

Source: hockey.no

== Women ==
=== Elite ===
- Jordal, Oslo
- Sparta, Sarpsborg
- Stavanger, Stavanger
- Vålerenga, Oslo

Source: hockey.no

=== First Division ===
- Bergen, Bergen
- Grüner, Oslo
- Jordal 2, Oslo
- Kongsberg/Ringerike, Kongsberg/Hønefoss
- Nes, Nes
- Skedsmo, Skedsmo
- Stavanger 2, Stavanger
- Tromsø, Tromsø
- Wing, Trondheim

Source: hockey.no
