= 2024–25 Norwegian First Division (ice hockey) =

- League: Norwegian First Division
- Sport: Ice hockey
- Duration: 20 September 2024 – 28 March 2025
- Games: Regular season: 140; Postseason: 13
- Teams: 10

Regular season
- Season champions: Nidaros Hockey
- Runners-up: Ringerike Panthers
- Promoted to EliteHockey Ligaen: Nidaros Hockey
- Relegated to Second Division: Bergen IK; Hasle-Løren IL

Playoffs
- Finals champions: Nidaros Hockey
- Runners-up: Ringerike Panthers

Norwegian First Division seasons
- ← 2023–24 2025–26 →

The 2024–25 Norwegian First Division season was the 35th season of second-tier professional ice hockey in Norway. The regular season ran from 20 September 2024 to 2 March 2025 with Nidaros Hockey finishing atop the standings. The postseason ran from 8 March to 28 March 2025. Nidaros Hockey defeated Ringerike Panthers 3 games to 1 for the league championship.

== Membership changes ==
- Narvik IK was promoted to EliteHockey Ligaen and replaced by the Ringerike Panthers.
- Hasle-Løren IL was set to be relegated to the Second Division. However, both Bergen IK and Furuset Ishockey were removed from the league due to financial difficulties. As a result, Hasle-Løren remained in the league while the open spots were filled by Manglerud Star Ishockey, who was already scheduled to join the league through promotion, and the Kongsvinger Knights, who had lost in the previous season's relegation round.

== Teams ==
2024–25 Norwegian First Division teams.
Eliteserien teams (Greater Oslo Region)

Team	City	Arena	Coach
Gjøvik Hockey	Gjøvik	Gjøvik Olympic Cavern Hall	(Sweden) Anton Säll Karlsson
Ringerike Panthers	Hønefoss	Schjongshallen	(Sweden) Joakim Fagervall
Kongsvinger Knights	Kongsvinger	Kongshallen	(Norway) Tom Ivar Hesbråten
Grüner Ishockey	Oslo	Grünerhallen	(Norway) Marius Grime Bjerke
Hasle-Løren IL	Oslo	Lørenhallen	(Canada) Gabe Gervais
Manglerud Star Ishockey	Oslo	Manglerudhallen	(Norway) Magnus Melbye
Ski Ishockey	Ski	Ski Ishall	(Sweden) Ulf Berglund
Nidaros Hockey	Trondheim	Leangen Ishall	(Sweden) Victor Wallson

== Standings ==
=== Regular season ===
Pos	Team	Pld	W	OTW	OTL	L	GF	GA	GD	Pts	Qualification
1	Nidaros Hockey	35	29	3	0	3	170	64	+106	93	Advanced to Semifinals
2	Ringerike Panthers	35	28	0	4	3	169	69	+100	88	Advanced to Semifinals
3	Gjøvik Hockey	35	20	2	3	10	146	84	+62	67	Advanced to Semifinals
4	Manglerud Star Ishockey	35	15	3	2	15	106	115	−9	53	Advanced to Semifinals
5	Grüner Ishockey	35	14	3	3	15	140	120	+20	51	
6	Ski Ishockey	35	6	4	2	23	77	163	−86	28	
7	Kongsvinger Knights	35	4	3	5	23	70	154	−84	23	Advanced to Relegation
8	Hasle-Løren IL	35	4	2	1	28	93	202	−109	17	Advanced to Relegation

Source: Results
Rules for classification: 1) Points; 2) Head-to-head points.

=== Statistics ===
==== Scoring leaders ====
Player	Team	Pos	GP	G	A	Pts	PIM
(Sweden) Oskar Håkansson	Nidaros Hockey	LW	35	30	35	65	16
(Sweden) Jonas Nyman	Gjøvik Hockey	C/LW	34	26	39	65	8
(Norway) David Hallström	Nidaros Hockey	W	32	13	43	56	8
(Sweden) Sebastian Åkesson	Ringerike Panthers	C/RW	35	20	33	53	10
(Sweden) Max Freyschuss Nordin	Ringerike Panthers	LW	34	21	26	47	16
(Canada) Alex Gagnon	Hasle-Løren IL	F	29	19	28	47	18
(Sweden) Dennis Svensson	Ringerike Panthers	C/LW	32	17	30	47	8
(Norway) Svein Petter Falk-Larssen	Nidaros Hockey	F	33	15	32	47	20
(Sweden) Jesper Emanuelsson	Gjøvik Hockey	LW	26	13	32	45	8
(Sweden) Mateusz Szurowski	Nidaros Hockey	C/W	35	24	20	44	16

==== Leading goaltenders ====
The following goaltenders led the league in goals against average, provided that they have played at least 1/3 of their team's minutes.

Player	Team	GP	TOI	W	L	GA	SO	SV%	GAA
(Norway) Jørgen Rønning	Ringerike Panthers	24	1380	21	1	42	1	.910	1.83
(Sweden) Alexander Johansson	Nidaros Hockey	28	1645	22	4	53	2	.917	1.94
(Sweden) Emil Norrman	Gjøvik Hockey	22	1293	13	8	45	2	.913	2.10
(Norway) Fabian Plogås	Grüner Ishockey	21	1154	12	9	51	0	.900	2.67
(Sweden) Oscar Darnell	Manglerud Star Ishockey	24	1401	11	11	68	1	.907	2.93

== Playoffs ==
=== Bracket ===
Semifinals (best-of-5)
1	Nidaros Hockey	4*	1	3	7	-
4	Manglerud Star Ishockey	3	2	2	2	-
2	Ringerike Panthers	2	4	2	5	7
3	Gjøvik Hockey	3	1	4	2	0

Championship (best-of-5)
1	Nidaros Hockey	4	3	1	3**	-
2	Ringerike Panthers	0	1	3	2	-

Note: * denotes overtime period(s)

== Relegation ==
Note: The bottom 2 teams in the regular season standings faced the 2 finalists of the Second Division to determine promotion and relegation between the two levels.

Home \ Away	BER	HAS	KON	TRO
Bergen IK	—	3–4	2–3 ^{(OT)}	8–2
Hasle-Løren IL	4–3	—	1–2	2–3 ^{(SO)}
Kongsvinger Knights	3–2 ^{(OT)}	2–1	—	0–2
Tromsø Hockey	2–8	3–2 ^{(SO)}	2–0	—

Updated to match(es) played on Final. Source: Results
Legend: Blue = home team win; Yellow = draw; Red = away team win.

Pos	Team	Pld	W	OTW	OTL	L	GF	GA	GD	Pts	Qualification
1	Tromsø Hockey	3	1	1	0	1	7	10	−3	5	Joined First Division for 2025–26
2	Kongsvinger Knights	3	1	1	0	1	5	5	0	5	Joined First Division for 2025–26
3	Hasle-Løren IL	3	1	0	1	1	7	8	−1	4	Joined Second Division for 2025–26
4	Bergen IK	3	1	0	1	1	13	9	+4	4	Joined Second Division for 2025–26

Updated to match(es) played on unknown. Source: Results
Rules for classification: 1) Points; 2) Head-to-head points.
