= 2017–18 Norwegian First Division (ice hockey) =

2017–18 First Division season
- League: (Norway) Norwegian First Division
- Sport: Ice hockey
- Duration: 23 September 2017 – March 2018
- Number of games: 32
- Number of teams: 9

Regular season
- League champions: Narvik

Playoffs

Seasons
- ← 2016–17 2018–19 →

The 2017–18 First Division was the 28th season of Norway's second highest ice hockey league, First Division.

The regular season began play on September 23, 2017, and was concluded on February 28, 2018.

The playoffs began March 2018.

== Participating teams ==
| Team | City | Arena | Capacity |
|---|---|---|---|
| Comet | Halden | Halden Ishall | 2,200 |
| Furuset | Oslo | Furuset Forum | 1,498 |
| Gjøvik | Gjøvik | Gjøvik Olympic Cavern Hall | 5,500 |
| Grüner | Oslo | Grünerhallen | 500 |
| Hasle-Løren | Oslo | Lørenhallen | 1,500 |
| Narvik | Narvik | Nordkraft Arena | 1,000 |
| Nidaros | Trondheim | Leangen Ishall | 3,000 |
| Ringerike Panthers | Hønefoss | Schjongshallen | 600 |
| Tønsberg | Tønsberg | Tønsberg Ishall | 400 |

=== Team changes ===
- Bergen went bankrupt in July 2017. The team was not replaced.
- Tønsberg was promoted through the 2016-17 playoffs. Moss was relegated.

== Regular season ==
=== Standings ===
Updated as of February 28, 2018.

| 2017–18 season | GP | W | L | OTW | OTL | GF | GA | +/– | Pts |
|---|---|---|---|---|---|---|---|---|---|
| Narvik^{y} | 32 | 24 | 5 | 1 | 2 | 147 | 75 | 72 | 76 |
| Ringerike Panthers^{x} | 32 | 22 | 5 | 4 | 1 | 164 | 70 | 94 | 75 |
| Nidaros | 32 | 19 | 8 | 1 | 4 | 117 | 79 | 38 | 63 |
| Comet | 32 | 18 | 10 | 3 | 1 | 142 | 103 | 39 | 61 |
| Hasle-Løren | 32 | 15 | 13 | 3 | 1 | 110 | 116 | -6 | 52 |
| Grüner | 32 | 9 | 19 | 2 | 2 | 115 | 153 | -28 | 33 |
| Tønsberg | 32 | 6 | 18 | 5 | 3 | 102 | 149 | -47 | 31 |
| Furuset | 32 | 5 | 21 | 0 | 6 | 76 | 144 | -68 | 21 |
| Gjøvik^{r} | 32 | 5 | 24 | 2 | 1 | 68 | 152 | -84 | 20 |

x – clinched promotional playoff spot; y – clinched regular season league title; r – play in relegation series

Source: hockey.no

== Playoffs ==
=== Promotional Playoffs ===
After the regular season had ended, the two lowest ranked teams in the 2017–18 GET-ligaen and the two highest ranked teams in the First Division competed for the right to play in the 2018–19 GET-ligaen. The tournament was organized according to a double round robin format, where each club played the others twice, home and away, for a total of six games. The points system and ranking method used, was the same as in the regular season.

==== Standings ====
Updated as of March 22, 2018.

| 2017–18 GET-ligaen playoffs | GP | W | L | OTW | OTL | GF | GA | +/– | Pts |
|---|---|---|---|---|---|---|---|---|---|
| Stjernen^{q} | 6 | 5 | 0 | 1 | 0 | 34 | 19 | 15 | 17 |
| Ringerike Panthers^{q} | 6 | 3 | 2 | 0 | 1 | 20 | 18 | 2 | 10 |
| Narvik^{r} | 6 | 2 | 3 | 1 | 0 | 17 | 20 | -3 | 8 |
| Kongsvinger Knights^{r} | 6 | 0 | 5 | 0 | 1 | 9 | 23 | -14 | 1 |

q – qualified for next years GET-league; r – will play in next years 1. division

Source: hockey.no

=== Relegational Playoffs ===
After the regular season ended, the lowest ranked team in the First Division and the two highest ranked teams in the Second Division competed for the right to play in the 2018–19 Norwegian First Division. The tournament is organized to be played over one weekend, where each club played the others once, for a total of three games. The points system and ranking method used was the same as in the regular season.

==== Standings ====
Updated as of March 22, 2018.

| 2018–19 1. division playoffs | GP | W | L | OTW | OTL | GF | GA | +/– | Pts |
|---|---|---|---|---|---|---|---|---|---|
| Gjøvik^{q} | 2 | 2 | 0 | 0 | 0 | 6 | 4 | 2 | 6 |
| Storhamar Yngres^{q} | 2 | 0 | 1 | 1 | 0 | 6 | 6 | 0 | 2 |
| Moss^{r} | 2 | 0 | 1 | 0 | 1 | 5 | 7 | -2 | 1 |

q – qualified for next years 1. division; r – will play in next years 2. division

Source: hockey.no
