= 2015–16 Norwegian First Division (ice hockey) =

2015–16 First Division season
- League: (Norway) Norwegian First Division
- Sport: Ice hockey
- Duration: 26 September 2015 – 22 March 2016
- Number of games: 36
- Number of teams: 10

Regular season
- League champions: Tønsberg Vikings

Playoffs

Seasons
- ← 2014–15 2016–17 →

The 2015–16 First Division was the 26th season of Norway's second highest ice hockey league, First Division.

The regular season began play on September 26, 2015, and was concluded on March 2, 2016.

The promotional and relegation playoffs began March 10, and ended March 22, 2016.

== Participating teams ==
Team	City	Arena	Capacity
Bergen	Bergen	Bergenshallen	3,000
Comet	Halden	Halden Ishall	2,200
Furuset	Oslo	Furuset Forum	1,498
Grüner	Oslo	Grünerhallen	500
Hasle-Løren	Oslo	Lørenhallen	1,500
Moss	Moss	Moss Ishall	500
Narvik	Narvik	Nordkraft Arena	1,000
Nes	Nes	Runnirinken Ishall	700
Ringerike Panthers	Hønefoss	Schjongshallen	600
Tønsberg Vikings	Tønsberg	Tønsberg Ishall	400

== Regular season ==
=== Standings ===
Updated as of March 2, 2016.

2015–16 season	GP	W	L	OTW	OTL	GF	GA	+/–	Pts
Tønsberg Vikings^{y}	36	27	8	0	1	168	71	+97	82
Bergen^{x}	36	22	10	2	2	155	111	+44	72
Grüner	36	21	10	2	3	153	106	+47	70
Hasle-Løren	36	20	11	3	2	169	109	+60	68
Narvik	36	19	12	4	1	131	112	+19	66
Ringerike Panthers	36	16	10	6	4	127	115	+12	64
Comet	36	11	19	4	2	130	130	+0	43
Moss	36	10	21	2	3	124	158	-34	37
Furuset^{r}	36	9	22	0	5	104	176	-72	32
Nes^{r}	36	2	34	0	0	69	242	-171	6

x – clinched promotional playoff spot; y – clinched regular season league title; r – play in relegation series

Source: hockey.no

== Playoffs ==
=== Promotional Playoffs ===
After the regular season has ended, the two lowest ranked teams in the 2015–16 GET-ligaen and the two highest ranked teams in the First Division competed for the right to play in the 2016–17 GET-ligaen. The tournament was organized according to a double round robin format, where each club played the others twice, home and away, for a total of six games. The points system and ranking method used, was the same as in the regular season.

==== Standings ====
Updated as of March 22, 2016.

2016–17 GET-ligaen playoffs	GP	W	L	OTW	OTL	GF	GA	+/–	Pts
Lillehammer^{q}	6	5	1	0	0	26	7	+19	15
Kongsvinger Knights^{q}	6	3	2	1	0	24	18	+6	11
Tønsberg Vikings^{r}	6	2	3	0	1	14	21	-7	7
Bergen^{r}	6	1	5	0	0	19	37	-18	3

q – qualified for next years GET-league; r – will play in next years 1. division

Source: hockey.no

=== Relegation Playoffs ===
After the regular season had ended, the two lowest ranked teams in the First Division and the two highest ranked teams in the Second Division competed for the right to play in the 2016–17 First Division. The tournament was organized to be played over one weekend, where each club played the others once, for a total of three games. The points system and ranking method used, is the same as in the regular season. The games was all played in Gjøvik Olympic Cavern Hall.

==== Standings ====
Updated as of March 13, 2016.

2016–17 First Division playoffs	GP	W	L	OTW	OTL	GF	GA	+/–	Pts
Nidaros^{q}	3	2	0	0	1	17	9	+8	7
Nes^{q}	3	1	1	1	0	7	8	-1	5
Furuset^{r}	3	1	2	0	0	5	11	-6	3
Gjøvik^{r}	3	0	1	1	1	12	13	-1	3

q – will play in next years 1. division; r – will play in next years 2. division

Source: hockey.no
