= 2018–19 Norwegian First Division (ice hockey) =

2018–19 First Division season
- League: (Norway) Norwegian First Division
- Sport: Ice hockey
- Duration: 22 September 2018 – March 2019
- Number of teams: 9

Regular season

Playoffs

Seasons
- ← 2017–18 2019–20 →

The 2018–19 First Division is the 29th season of Norway's second highest ice hockey league, First Division.

The regular season began play on September 22, 2018, and will be concluded on March 3, 2019.

The promotional and relegation playoffs began in March 2019.

== Participating teams ==
Team	City	Arena	Capacity
Comet	Halden	Halden Ishall	2,200
Furuset	Oslo	Furuset Forum	1,498
Gjøvik	Gjøvik	Gjøvik Olympic Cavern Hall	5,500
Grüner	Oslo	Grünerhallen	500
Hasle-Løren	Oslo	Lørenhallen	1,500
Kongsvinger Knights	Kongsvinger	Kongsvinger Ishall	2,000
Narvik	Narvik	Nordkraft Arena	1,000
Nidaros	Trondheim	Leangen Ishall	3,000
Storhamar Yngres	Hamar	CC Amfi	7,500
Tønsberg	Tønsberg	Tønsberg Ishall	400

=== Team changes ===
- Kongsvinger Knights was relegated through the 2017-18 promotional playoffs. Ringerike Panthers was promoted.
- Kongsvinger Knights went bankrupt midway through the season, on December 18, 2018.

== Regular season ==
=== Standings ===
Updated as of March 3, 2019.

2017–18 season	GP	W	L	OTW	OTL	GF	GA	+/–	Pts
Narvik^{y}	32	26	0	1	5	177	75	102	82
Grüner^{x}	32	22	7	1	2	160	89	71	72
Comet	32	21	7	3	1	176	83	93	72
Hasle-Løren	32	17	12	2	1	136	140	-4	58
Nidaros	32	13	13	3	3	123	111	12	50
Gjøvik	32	13	16	2	1	131	135	-4	45
Tønsberg	32	10	18	1	3	115	132	-17	36
Furuset	32	6	23	2	1	70	168	-98	23
Storhamar Yngres^{r}	32	1	28	1	2	63	218	-155	7
Kongsvinger Knights	folded								

x – clinched promotional playoff spot; y – clinched regular season league title; r – play in relegation series

Source: hockey.no

== Playoffs ==
=== Promotional Playoffs ===
After the regular season ends, the lowest ranked team in the 2018–19 GET-ligaen and the two highest ranked teams in the First Division will compete for the right to play in the 2019–20 GET-ligaen. The tournament will be organized according to a double round robin format, where each club plays the others twice, home and away, for a total of four games. The points system and ranking method used, is the same as in the regular season.

=== Relegational Playoffs ===
After the regular season ended, the lowest ranked team in the First Division and the two highest ranked teams in the Second Division should have competed for the right to play in the 2019–20 Norwegian First Division. However, due to the bankruptcy of Kongsvinger Knights, and the announcement of Storhamar Yngres to withdraw from the 2019-20 season, the spots were offered to the two best Second Division teams, Lørenskog and Haugesund Seagulls.
