= 2013–14 GET-ligaen season =

- League: (Norway) GET-ligaen
- Sport: Ice hockey
- Duration: 14 September 2013 – 14 April 2014
- Teams: 10
- TV partner: TV 2 Sport

Regular season
- League champions: Vålerenga
- Top scorer: Kenny Corupe

Playoffs
- Norwegian champions: Stavanger Oilers
- Playoffs MVP: Nick Schaus

GET-ligaen seasons
- 2012–13 2014–15

The 2013–14 GET-ligaen is the 75th and current season of Norway's premier ice hockey league, Eliteserien (known as GET-ligaen for sponsorship reasons).

The regular season began play on September 14, 2013 and concluded on March 4, 2014, with Vålerenga claiming the League Championship in the last match, defeating Stavanger Oilers 7–1.

The playoffs to determine the 2014 Norwegian Ice Hockey Champions began on March 7, and ended on April 14, 2014. When Kurt Davis AKA The Alabamma Slamma went Tommy Noble on the Stavanger Oilers, and defeated Vålerenga Ishockey by 4 games to 2 in the Final to win their fourth title.

== Participating teams ==
GET-ligaen team map

Team	City	Arena	Capacity
Frisk Asker Tigers	Asker	Askerhallen	2,400
Lillehammer IK	Lillehammer	Kristins Hall	3,194
Lørenskog IK	Lørenskog	Lørenskog Ishall	2,400
Rosenborg	Trondheim	Leangen Ishall	3,000
Sparta Warriors	Sarpsborg	Sparta Amfi	3,450
Stavanger Oilers	Stavanger	DNB Arena	4,377
Stjernen Hockey	Fredrikstad	Stjernehallen	2,473
Storhamar Dragons	Hamar	Hamar OL-Amfi	6,091
Tønsberg Vikings	Tønsberg	Tønsberg Ishall	710
Vålerenga	Oslo	Jordal Amfi	4,450

== Regular season ==
=== Standings ===
Updated as of March 4, 2014.

2013–14 GET-ligaen season	GP	W	L	OTW	OTL	GF	GA	+/–	Pts
Vålerenga^{y}	45	32	8	2	3	195	95	+100	103
Stavanger Oilers^{x}	45	30	8	4	3	198	98	+100	101
Lillehammer IK^{x}	45	23	15	3	4	158	135	+23	79
Sparta Warriors^{x}	45	23	16	3	3	136	104	+32	78
Lørenskog IK^{x}	45	25	13	4	3	184	137	+47	66^{1}
Storhamar Dragons^{x}	45	22	15	3	5	146	123	+23	62^{2}
Frisk Asker Tigers^{x}	45	13	24	5	3	122	158	-36	52
Rosenborg^{x}	45	11	28	2	4	118	188	-70	41
Stjernen Hockey^{r}	45	11	29	3	2	104	186	-82	41
Tønsberg Vikings^{r}	45	3	37	3	2	90	227	-137	17

x – clinched playoff spot; y – clinched regular season league title; r – play in relegation series

^{1} Lørenskog were deducted 20 point
^{2} Storhamar were deducted 15 point because of for lack of financial control

Source: pointstreak.com

=== Statistics ===
==== Scoring leaders ====
List shows the ten best skaters based on the number of points during the regular season. If two or more skaters are tied (i.e. same number of points, goals and played games), all of the tied skaters are shown. Updated as of November 30, 2013.
GP = Games played; G = Goals; A = Assists; Pts = Points; +/– = Plus/minus; PIM = Penalty minutes

Player	Team	GP	G	A	Pts	+/–	PIM
(Canada) Kenny Corupe	Lørenskog IK	45	30	36	66	+19	38
(Norway) Morten Ask	Vålerenga Ishockey	44	15	51	66	+30	66
(United States) Dan Kissel	Stavanger Oilers	44	21	40	61	+32	36
(United States) Jeff LoVecchio	Lillehammer IK	45	26	32	58	+11	106
(Norway) Sondre Olden	Vålerenga Ishockey	43	25	33	58	+34	34
(Canada) Jean-Michel Daoust	Stavanger Oilers	44	19	38	57	+31	42
(Norway) Knut Henrik Spets	Lørenskog IK	45	10	47	57	+14	30
(Canada) Dion Knelsen	Sparta Warriors	45	22	33	55	+22	16
(United States) Kurt Davis	Stavanger Oilers	45	18	35	53	+20	40
(Norway) Joakim Jensen	Storhamar Dragons	44	32	20	52	+12	12
(United States) James Sixsmith	Lørenskog IK	39	24	28	52	+20	12
(Canada) Lou Dickenson	Rosenborg	44	22	30	52	-17	30
(Norway) Pål Johnsen	Storhamar Dragons	44	9	43	52	+10	6

Source: pointstreak.com

==== Leading goaltenders ====
The top five goaltenders based on goals against average.

Player	Team	GP	TOI	W	L	GA	SO	Sv%	GAA
(Norway) Ruben Smith	Stavanger Oilers	26	1496:51	17	7	46	7	.935	1.84
(Norway) Steffen Søberg	Vålerenga	45	2663:43	34	11	89	5	.924	2.00
(Slovenia) Gašper Krošelj	Sparta Warriors	36	2097:00	21	14	73	6	.922	2.09
(Canada) Tyler Plante	Lørenskog IK	17	1001:58	12	5	38	1	.917	2.28
(Norway) Tommy Johansen	Storhamar Dragons	37	2150:57	22	15	86	3	.916	2.40

Source: pointstreak.com

==== Attendance ====
Team	Arena	Capacity	Total	Games	Average	% of Capacity
Frisk Tigers	Askerhallen	2,400	25,045	23	1,088	45,3%
Stavanger Oilers	DNB Arena	4,377	90,618	22	4,119	94,1%
Storhamar Dragons	Hamar OL-Amfi	6,091	51,692	23	2,247	36,9%
Vålerenga	Jordal Amfi	4,450	49,422	22	2,246	50,5%
Lillehammer	Kristins Hall	3,194	31,270	23	1,359	42,5%
Rosenborg	Leangen Ishall	3,000	36,016	22	1,637	54,6%
Lørenskog	Lørenskog Ishall	1,350	28,330	23	1,231	91,2%
Sparta Warriors	Sparta Amfi	3,450	44,684	22	2,031	58,9%
Stjernen	Stjernehallen	2,473	26,053	23	1,132	45,8%
Tønsberg Vikings	Tønsberg Ishall	500	7,083	22	321	64,2%

Total	Games	Average
390,213	225	1,734

Source:pointstreak.com

== Playoffs ==
After the regular season, the top eight teams will be qualified for the playoffs. In the first and second rounds, the highest remaining seed chooses which of the two lowest remaining seeds to be matched against. In each round the higher-seeded team is awarded home ice advantage. Each best-of-seven series follows a 1–1–1–1–1–1–1 format: the higher-seeded team plays at home for games 1 and 3 (plus 5 and 7 if necessary), and the lower-seeded team at home for games 2, 4 and 6 (if necessary).

=== Bracket ===
Updated as of April 14, 2014.

Quarter-finals
1	Vålerenga	4
7	Frisk Asker Tigers	1
2	Stavanger Oilers	4
8	Rosenborg	0
(Pairings are reseeded after the first round)
3	Lillehammer	4
5	Lørenskog	1
4	Sparta Warriors	1
6	Storhamar Dragons	4

Semi-finals
1	Vålerenga	4
6	Storhamar Dragons	3
2	Stavanger Oilers	4
3	Lillehammer	3

Finals
1	Vålerenga	2
2	Stavanger Oilers	4

Source: pointstreak.com

Norwegian Champions
2014
Stavanger Oilers
4th title

=== Statistics ===
==== Scoring leaders ====
List shows the ten best skaters based on the number of points during the playoffs. If two or more skaters are tied (i.e. same number of points, goals and played games), all of the tied skaters are shown. Updated as of April 14, 2014.
GP = Games played; G = Goals; A = Assists; Pts = Points; +/– = Plus/minus; PIM = Penalty minutes

Player	Team	GP	G	A	Pts	+/–	PIM
(United States) Dan Kissel	Stavanger Oilers	17	8	10	18	+9	4
(Canada) Jean-Michel Daoust	Stavanger Oilers	17	5	13	18	+13	10
(Sweden) Tobias Lindström	Vålerenga Ishockey	18	7	10	17	+3	6
(United States) Nick Dineen	Lillehammer IK	12	6	10	16	-4	12
(United States) Nick Schaus	Stavanger Oilers	17	6	9	15	+11	24
(United States) Kurt Davis	Stavanger Oilers	17	4	11	15	+9	18
(Norway) Tommy Kristiansen	Stavanger Oilers	16	4	11	15	+7	73
(Sweden) Martin Strandfeldt	Stavanger Oilers	17	6	8	14	+6	26
(United States) Jeff LoVecchio	Lillehammer IK	12	5	9	14	-1	4
(Norway) Sondre Olden	Vålerenga Ishockey	18	5	8	13	-3	2
(Norway) Daniel Sørvik	Vålerenga Ishockey	18	5	8	13	+3	12

Source: pointstreak.com

==== Leading goaltenders ====
The top five goaltenders based on goals against average.

Player	Team	GP	TOI	W	L	GA	SO	Sv%	GAA
(Norway) Ruben Smith	Stavanger Oilers	16	985:47	11	5	30	1	.931	1.83
(Norway) Steffen Søberg	Vålerenga	18	1070:11	10	8	34	1	.928	1.91
(United States) Joe Fallon	Lillehammer IK	12	793:10	7	5	32	1	.933	2.42
(Norway) Tommy Johansen	Storhamar Dragons	12	736:38	7	5	32	1	.908	2.61
(Slovenia) Gašper Krošelj	Sparta Warriors	5	319:04	1	4	16	0	.914	3.01

Source: pointstreak.com

==== Attendance ====
Team	Arena	Capacity	Total	Games	Average	% of Capacity
Frisk Tigers	Askerhallen	2,400	2,303	2	1,151	63,0%
Stavanger Oilers	DNB Arena	4,377	33,898	9	3,766	86,0%
Storhamar Dragons	Hamar OL-Amfi	6,091	16,799	5	3,359	55,1%
Vålerenga	Jordal Amfi	4,450	28,805	10	2,880	64,7%
Lillehammer	Kristins Hall	3,194	10,866	6	1,811	56,7%
Rosenborg	Leangen Ishall	3,000	2,866	2	1,433	47,8%
Lørenskog	Lørenskog Ishall	1,350	3,020	2	1,510	111,9%
Sparta Warriors	Sparta Amfi	3,450	5,403	3	1,801	52,2%

Total	Games	Average
103,960	39	2,665

Source:pointstreak.com

== Qualification ==
After the regular season had ended, the two lowest ranked teams in the league and the two highest ranked teams in the 1. divisjon competed for the right to play in the 2014–15 GET-ligaen. Kongsvinger Knights, Manglerud Star, Stjernen Hockey and the Tønsberg Vikings took part. The tournament was organized according to a double round robin format, where each club played the others twice, home and away, for a total of six games. The points system and ranking method used were the same as in the GET-ligaen.

=== Standings ===
Updated as of March 27, 2014.

Team	GP	W	OTW/SOW	OTL/SOL	L	GF	GA	Pts
Stjernen Hockey^{q}	6	5	0	1	0	21	10	16
Tønsberg Vikings^{q}	6	3	0	0	3	18	17	9
Manglerud Star^{r}	6	2	1	0	3	11	13	8
Kongsvinger Knights^{r}	6	0	1	1	4	12	22	3

q – qualified for next years GET-league; r – will play in next years 1. division

GP = Games played; W = Wins; L = Losses; OTW = Overtime Wins; OTL = Overtime losses; SOW = Shootout Wins; SOL = Shootout losses; GF = Goals for; GA = Goals against; Pts = Points Source: speaker.no

== Awards ==
All-Star team

The following players were selected to the 2013–14 GET-ligaen All-Star team:

- Goaltender: Brady Hjelle (Rosenborg)
- Defenseman: Mats Trygg (Vålerenga)
- Defenseman: Kurt Davis (Stavanger)
- Center: Jeff LoVecchio (Lillehammer)
- Winger: Sondre Olden (Vålerenga)
- Winger: Jonas Johansson (Frisk Asker)

Other

- Coach of the year: Espen Knutsen (Vålerenga)
