= Petter Røste Fossen =

Norwegian ice hockey player

- Born: February 16, 1991 (age 34); Kongsberg, Norway
- Height: 6 ft 0 in (183 cm)
- Weight: 185 lb (84 kg; 13 st 3 lb)
- Position: Wing
- Shoots: Left
- First Division team Former teams: Tønsberg; Lillehammer IK; Rosenborg IHK; Stavanger Oilers; Stjernen
- National team: Norway
- Playing career: 2009–present

Petter Røste Fossen (born February 16, 1991) is a Norwegian ice hockey player who is currently playing for Tønsberg of the Norwegian First Division.
