= Carl Gustafsson (ice hockey) =

Colombian-born Swedish ice hockey player

- Born: October 23, 1989 (age 36) Puerto Rico, Colombia
- Height: 5 ft 7 in (170 cm)
- Weight: 179 lb (81 kg; 12 st 11 lb)
- Position: Left wing
- Shot: Left
- Played for: SHL; Djurgårdens IF; Hockeyallsvenskan; IF Troja/Ljungby; Rögle BK; Almtuna IS; Huddinge IK; GET; Rosenborg IHK
- National team: Sweden
- Playing career: 2007–2014

Carl Gustafsson (born October 23, 1989) is a retired Colombian-born Swedish ice hockey player. He came up through the youth ranks of Djurgårdens IF. He played for several Swedish HockeyAllsvenskan clubs, among them IF Troja/Ljungby.

== Career statistics ==
			Regular season					Playoffs
Season	Team	League	GP	G	A	Pts	PIM	GP	G	A	Pts	PIM
2004–05	Hammarby IF U16	U16 SM	5	9	2	11	8	—	—	—	—	—
2004–05	Hammarby IF J18	J18 Elit	4	3	0	3	0	—	—	—	—	—
2005–06	Djurgårdens IF J18	J18 Elit	16	6	15	21	6	—	—	—	—	—
2005–06	Djurgårdens IF J18	J18 Allsvenskan	12	8	7	15	6	4	1	1	2	0
2006–07	Djurgårdens IF J18	J18 Allsvenskan	1	1	1	2	0	3	1	0	1	2
2006–07	Djurgårdens IF J20	SuperElit	37	6	10	16	10	7	0	1	1	0
2007–08	Djurgårdens IF J20	SuperElit	18	5	8	13	14	7	1	6	7	6
2007–08	Djurgårdens IF	SHL	34	1	1	2	6	—	—	—	—	—
2008–09	Djurgårdens IF J20	SuperElit	4	2	2	4	0	6	1	1	2	2
2008–09	Djurgårdens IF	SHL	41	4	4	8	10	—	—	—	—	—
2008–08	Huddinge IK	Allsvenskan	9	1	5	6	2	—	—	—	—	—
2009–10	Djurgårdens IF J20	SuperElit	5	2	1	3	2	—	—	—	—	—
2009–10	Djurgårdens IF	SHL	12	0	0	0	4	—	—	—	—	—
2009–10	Almtuna IS	Allsvenskan	35	8	12	20	0	10	2	4	6	0
2010–11	Rögle BK J20	SuperElit	3	0	2	2	0	—	—	—	—	—
2010–11	Rögle BK	Allsvenskan	41	8	10	18	6	5	0	1	1	2
2011–12	IF Troja-Ljungby	Allsvenskan	51	7	24	31	37	—	—	—	—	—
2012–13	IF Troja-Ljungby	Allsvenskan	49	6	7	13	8	—	—	—	—	—
2013–14	Rosenborg IHK	Norway	45	7	21	28	22	3	2	0	2	4
Allsvenskan totals			185	30	58	88	53	15	2	5	7	2
