= Norwegian First Division (ice hockey) =

Norwegian ice hockey league

- Sport: Ice hockey
- Founded: 1990
- No. of teams: 8
- Country: Norway
- Continent: Europe
- Most recent champion: Narvik
- Promotion to: EliteHockey Ligaen
- Relegation to: Norwegian Second Division

The Norwegian First Division is the second level of ice hockey in Norway. It is below EliteHockey Ligaen and above the 2. divisjon.

== Teams ==
The following ten clubs will compete in the 1.division during the 2024–25 season.

Team	Municipality	Arena	Capacity	Coach
Bergen	Bergen	Bergenshallen	3,000	Jørgen Skjold Fløholm (NOR)
Gjøvik	Gjøvik	Gjøvik Olympiske Fjellhall	5,830	Anton Säll Karlsson (SWE)
Grüner	Oslo	Grünerhallen	500	Marius Grime Bjerke (NOR)
Kongsvinger IL	Kongsvinger	Kongshallen	550	Lars Erik Hesbråten (NOR)
Manglerud Star	Oslo	Manglerud Ishall	2,000	TBD (25x17px)
Nidaros	Trondheim	Leangen Ishall	3,000	Victor Wallson (SWE)
Ringerike Panthers	Ringerike	Schjongshallen	1,700	Martin Boork (SWE)
Ski	Nordre Follo	Ski Ishall	600	Ulf Berglund (SWE)

1. divisjon teams

== Champions ==
Year	Champion	2nd place	3rd place
2023–24	Narvik	Nidaros	Grüner
2022–23	Nidaros	Narvik	Lørenskog
2019–20	Lørenskog	Comet Halden	Ringerike Panthers
2018–19	Narvik	Grüner	Comet Halden
2017–18	Narvik	Ringerike Panthers	Nidaros Hockey
2016–17	Nidaros	Comet Halden	Ringerike Panthers
2015–16	Tønsberg Vikings	Bergen IK	Grüner
2014–15	Tønsberg Vikings	Comet Halden	Ringerike Panthers
2013–14	Manglerud Star	Kongsvinger Knights	Comet Halden
2012–13	Comet Halden	Ringerike Panthers	Bergen IK
2011–12	Tønsberg Vikings	Comet Halden	Hasle-Løren
2010–11	Tønsberg Vikings	Comet Halden	Hasle-Løren
2009–10	Rosenborg	Kongsvinger Knights	Grüner
2008–09	Kongsvinger Knights	Manglerud Star	Rosenborg
2007–08	Lørenskog	Grüner	Kongsvinger Knights
2006–07	Lørenskog	Vålerenga 2	Manglerud Star
2005–06	Furuset	Gjøvik	Grüner
2004–05	Furuset	Manglerud Star	Hasle-Løren
2003–04	Comet	Hasle-Løren	Gjøvik
2002–03	Stavanger Oilers	Bergen	Gjøvik
2001–02	Hasle-Løren	Comet	Ski Icehawks
2000–01	Hasle-Løren	Comet	Jar
