= Kongsvinger =

Kongsvinger may refer to:

== Places ==
- Kongsvinger Municipality, a municipality in Innlandet county, Norway
- Kongsvinger (town), a town within Kongsvinger Municipality in Innlandet county, Norway
- Kongsvinger Fortress, a fortress in Kongsvinger Municipality in Innlandet county, Norway
- Kongsvinger Prison, a prison in Kongsvinger Municipality in Innlandet county, Norway

== Sport ==
- Kongsvinger IL, a sports club based in the town of Kongsvinger in Innlandet county, Norway
- Kongsvinger Ishall, an indoor ice hockey arena in the town of Kongsvinger in Innlandet county, Norway
- Kongsvinger IL Toppfotball, an association football club based in the town of Kongsvinger in Innlandet county, Norway
- Kongsvinger Knights, an ice hockey club based in the town of Kongsvinger in Innlandet county, Norway

== Transportation ==
- Kongsvinger Station, a railway station in the town of Kongsvinger in Innlandet county, Norway
- Kongsvinger Line, a railway line in eastern Norway
