= Juuso Rämö =

Finnish ice hockey player

- Born: May 7, 1994 (age 30); Tampere, Finland
- Height: 6 ft 2 in (188 cm)
- Weight: 192 lb (87 kg; 13 st 10 lb)
- Position: Forward
- Shoots: Left
- First Division team Former teams: Haugesund Seagulls; Ilves
- NHL draft: Undrafted
- Playing career: 2014–present

Juuso Rämö (born May 7, 1994) is a Finnish professional ice hockey forward playing for the Haugesund Seagulls of the Norwegian First Division.

Rämö made his Liiga debut playing with Ilves during the 2013–14 Liiga season.
