= Nick Schaus =

American professional ice hockey player (born 1986)

Nicholas Schaus
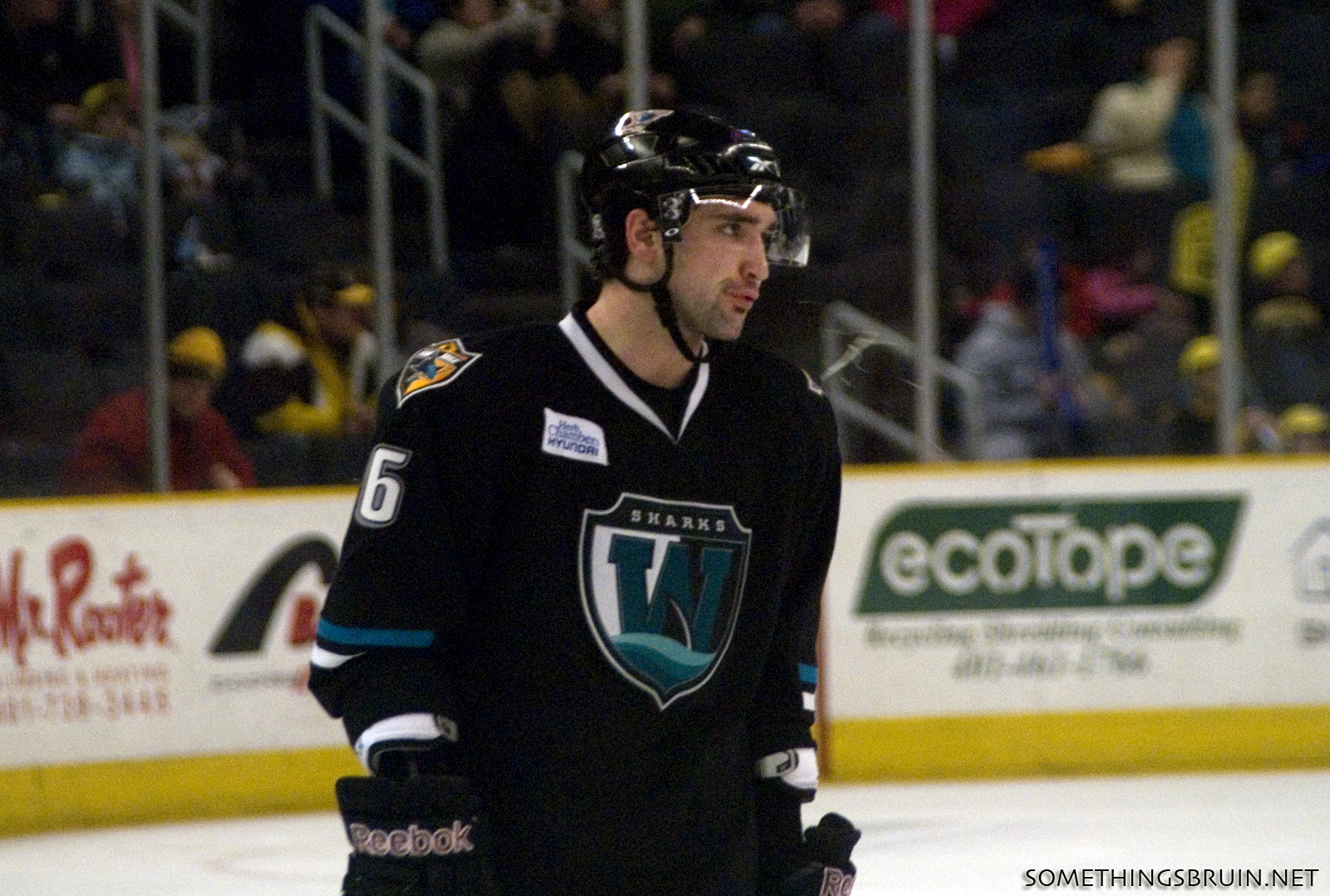
- Born: July 3, 1986 (age 38); Buffalo, New York, U.S.
- Height: 5 ft 11 in (180 cm)
- Weight: 190 lb (86 kg; 13 st 8 lb)
- Position: Defense
- Shoots: Right
- team Former teams: Free Agent; Worcester Sharks; Syracuse Crunch; Norfolk Admirals; Stavanger Oilers; EHC Wolfsburg; HC TWK Innsbruck; Metallurg Magnitogorsk; Kunlun Red Star; HC Slovan Bratislava; HC Kometa Brno; HC Dynamo Pardubice
- NHL draft: Undrafted
- Playing career: 2010–present

Nicholas Charles Schaus (born July 3, 1986) is an American professional ice hockey player who is currently an unrestricted free agent. He is most recently playing for the Norfolk Admirals in the ECHL.

== Playing career ==
Undrafted, Schaus spent four years at UMass Lowell (Hockey East) from 2006–10, recording 65 points (10-55) and 220 penalty minutes in 148 career games.

On March 22, 2010, he was signed as a free agent by the San Jose Sharks. After a season in the American Hockey League with Sharks affiliate, the Worcester Sharks, Schaus signed a one-year contract to remain in the AHL on July 5, 2011, with the Syracuse Crunch.

Unable to earn an NHL contract, Schaus embarked on a European career, signing a contract with Norwegian club, the Stavanger Oilers for the 2013–14 season on February 8, 2013. Schaus made an immediate impact with the Oilers, helping the club win the Championship in earning playoff MVP honors.

Schaus spent the 2014–15 season with German club, the Grizzly Adams Wolfsburg of the DEL. He helped the club reach the semi-final against the Champion Mannheim Eagles. Contributing 15 points in 45 games before opting to leave as a free agent at season's end in signing with Austrian club HC TWK Innsbruck on May 28, 2015.

After a season in the Czech Extraliga with HC Dynamo Pardubice, Schaus garnered attention from the Kontinental Hockey League and signed with contending club, Metallurg Magnitogorsk, to a one-year deal on May 10, 2017. In the 2017–18 season, Schaus cemented a regular role on the blueline of Magnitogorsk and contributed with 3 goals and 12 points in 37 games before he was traded by the club, to Chinese competitors Kunlun Red Star, in exchange for Wojtek Wolski on December 14, 2017.

As a free agent from Kunlun, Schaus continued in the KHL, agreeing to a one-year deal with Slovak club HC Slovan Bratislava, on June 29, 2018. In the 2018–19 season, Schaus appeared in 10 games scoring 1 goal and 1 assist with Bratislava before opting to return to the Czech Extraliga with HC Kometa Brno on November 7, 2018. He registered 2 assists in 16 games with Brno, before rejoining his former club, Dynamo Pardubice, on January 11, 2019.

On September 23, 2021, Schaus extended his career by returning to the ECHL and signing with the Norfolk Admirals for the 2021–22 season.

== Career statistics ==
			Regular season					Playoffs
Season	Team	League	GP	G	A	Pts	PIM	GP	G	A	Pts	PIM
2002–03	River City Lancers	USHL	60	4	9	13	60	11	0	0	0	10
2003–04	River City Lancers	USHL	57	1	12	13	144	3	0	0	0	6
2004–05	Omaha Lancers	USHL	58	1	21	22	141	5	0	0	0	8
2005–06	Omaha Lancers	USHL	60	9	44	53	80	5	0	2	2	6
2006–07	UMass-Lowell	HE	36	1	13	14	56	—	—	—	—	—
2007–08	UMass-Lowell	HE	37	0	6	6	83	—	—	—	—	—
2008–09	UMass-Lowell	HE	38	5	17	22	65	—	—	—	—	—
2009–10	UMass-Lowell	HE	37	4	19	23	16	—	—	—	—	—
2009–10	Worcester Sharks	AHL	4	0	3	3	2	11	0	3	3	14
2010–11	Worcester Sharks	AHL	77	4	15	19	46	—	—	—	—	—
2011–12	Syracuse Crunch	AHL	45	4	4	8	30	3	0	2	2	9
2011–12	Elmira Jackals	ECHL	10	1	4	5	4	—	—	—	—	—
2012–13	Norfolk Admirals	AHL	18	1	2	3	17	—	—	—	—	—
2012–13	Fort Wayne Komets	ECHL	26	5	12	17	58	—	—	—	—	—
2013–14	Stavanger Oilers	GET	33	9	25	34	138	17	6	9	15	24
2014–15	Grizzly Adams Wolfsburg	DEL	45	3	12	15	56	9	0	2	2	55
2015–16	HC TWK Innsbruck	EBEL	53	12	21	33	97	—	—	—	—	—
2016–17	HC Dynamo Pardubice	ELH	48	7	29	36	106	—	—	—	—	—
2017–18	Metallurg Magnitogorsk	KHL	37	3	9	12	26	—	—	—	—	—
2017–18	Kunlun Red Star	KHL	16	1	3	4	2	—	—	—	—	—
2018–19	HC Slovan Bratislava	KHL	10	1	1	2	6	—	—	—	—	—
2018–19	HC Kometa Brno	ELH	16	0	2	2	20	—	—	—	—	—
2019–20	Kedgwick Dynamo	CRL	4	0	6	6	12	—	—	—	—	—
2019–20	Florida Everblades	ECHL	12	0	5	5	4	—	—	—	—	—
2019–20	Piráti Chomutov	Czech.1	8	2	5	7	43	—	—	—	—	—
2021–22	Norfolk Admirals	ECHL	56	4	11	15	43	—	—	—	—	—
2022–23	Norfolk Admirals	ECHL	14	0	4	4	8	—	—	—	—	—
AHL totals			144	9	24	33	95	14	0	5	5	23

== Awards and honors ==
Award	Year
USHL
Defenseman of the Year	2006
GET
Playoffs MVP	2014
Champion (Stavanger Oilers)	2014
IIHF Continental Cup Champion	2014
