= Anton Persson (ice hockey) =

Swedish ice hockey player (born 1989)

- Born: 4 January 1989 (age 36) Gävle, Sweden
- Height: 5 ft 10 in (178 cm)
- Weight: 180 lb (82 kg; 12 st 12 lb)
- Position: Forward
- Shoots: Right
- Nor-2 team Former teams: Tønsberg Vikings; Brynäs IF (SEL; IK Oskarshamn; Västerviks IK; Mörrums GoIS IK
- Playing career: 2007–present

Anton Persson (born 4 January 1989) is a Swedish ice hockey player. He was playing with Brynäs IF in the Elitserien. He is currently playing with Tønsberg Vikings in the Norwegian First Division.
