= Anton Persson =

Anton Persson may refer to:

- Anton Persson (ice hockey)
- Anton Persson (skier)
