= Jere Elo =

Finnish professional ice hockey player

- Born: March 7, 1992 (age 33); Helsinki, Finland
- Height: 6 ft 3 in (191 cm)
- Weight: 181 lb (82 kg; 12 st 13 lb)
- Position: Forward
- Shoots: Right
- Nor.1 team Former teams: Nes IK; Espoo Blues
- NHL draft: Undrafted
- Playing career: 2013–present

Jere Elo (born March 7, 1992) is a Finnish professional ice hockey player. He is currently playing with Nes IK in the Norwegian First Division (Nor.1).

Elo made his Liiga debut playing with Espoo Blues during the 2013–14 Liiga season before he was loaned to Kiekko-Vantaa in the Finnish Mestis for the remainder of the season.
