= Skien IK =

- City: Skien, Norway
- League: Second Division
- Founded: 1965
- Home arena: Skien Ishall

Franchise history
- 1965-present: Skien IK

Skien IK is an ice hockey team in Skien, Norway. They currently play in the Norwegian Second Division, the third level of Norwegian ice hockey. The teams plays its home games in the Skien Ishall.

== History ==
The club was founded in 1965. They played in the Norwegian First Division in the years 2012-14.
