= Norwegian Second Division (ice hockey) =

Third level ice hockey in Norway

- Sport: Ice hockey
- No. of teams: 8
- Country: Norway
- Most recent champion: Manglerud Star
- Promotion to: Norwegian First Division (ice hockey)

The Norwegian Second Division is the third level of ice hockey in Norway. It is below the First Division.

== Teams ==
The following clubs are as, of April 2024, playing in the 2. divisjon for the 2023–24 season.

Team	City/Area	Arena	Capacity	Coach
Current Teams
Hasle-Løren	Oslo	Lørenhallen	1,500	
Kristiansand IK	Kristiansand	Idda Arena	400	
Kråkene Moss	Moss	Moss ishall	500	
Tromsø	Tromsø	Tromsø ishall	400	
Tønsberg Vikings	Tønsberg	Tønsberg Ishall	750	Daniel Kristoffersen Njie (NOR)
TBD	TBD	TBD	0	
TBD	TBD	TBD	0	
TBD	TBD	TBD	0	

== Champions ==
Year	Champion	2nd place	3rd place
2022-23	Manglerud Star	Kongsvinger IL	Tromsø
2022-23	Ski	Kongsvinger IL	Narvik IK 2
2021-22	Bergen	Tønsberg Vikings	Kongsvinger IL
2019-20	Bergen	Skien IHK	Kongsvinger IL
2018-19	Lørenskog	Haugesund Seagulls	Bergen
2017-18	Moss	Storhamar Yngres	Bergen
2016-17	Tønsberg	Storhamar Yngres	Ski Icehawks
2015-16	Nidaros	Gjøvik	Prinsdalen Wheels
2014-15	Astor	Gjøvik	Lokomotiv Fana
2013-14	Haugesund Seagulls	Gjøvik	Prinsdalen Wheels
2012-13	Moss	Prinsdalen Wheels	Gjøvik
2011-12	Prinsdalen Wheels	Nes	Ski Icehawks
2010-11	Oppsal	Prinsdalen Wheels	Nes
2009-10	Prinsdalen Wheels	Oppsal	Nes
