= Kristiansand IK =

Norwegian ice hockey team

- City: Kristiansand, Norway
- League: 2. divisjon
- Founded: 26. October 1992; 34 years ago
- Home arena: Idda Arena
- Colors: Red, black, white
- Head coach: Kjetil Aslak Holta
- Captain: Mads Pedersen
- Website: https://wp.kik.no/

Kristiansand Ishockeyklubb is an ice hockey team in Kristiansand, Norway. They currently play in the 2. Divisjon, the 3. level of Norwegian ice hockey.

The club was founded in 1992. Kristiansand IK plays at their home matches at the Idda Arena. The team is nicknamed KIK Lions after the lion in the coat of arms of Kristiansand Municipality.

Idda Arena was the first indoor ice rink in Southern Norway. It was decided by the municipality to build the facility in 2005. It was completed in 2011 and serves as the home for Christianssands Curling Club, as well as Kristiansand IK's heated local rival Idda Ishockey.
