= Holmen Hockey =

- City: Asker, Norway
- League: Norwegian Second Division
- Founded: 1934
- Home arena: Holmen Ishall

Franchise history
- 1934-present: Holmen

Holmen Hockey (also known as the Holmen Red Eagles) is the ice hockey division of Holmen IF based in Asker, Norway. The club currently participates in the Second Division, the third level of Norwegian ice hockey. They play their home games at Holmen Ishall.

== History ==
The hockey branch of Holmen IF was founded in 1934, and joined in the founding of the Norwegian Ice Hockey Association in the same year. The team played in the top-level Norwegian league from 1934 to 1939 and from 1946 to 1948.
