= Rosenborg IHK =

Rosenborg
- City: Trondheim, Norway
- League: 2.divjsion
- Founded: 1934; 92 years ago
- Home arena: Leangen Ishall
- Colors: Black, white
- Website: http://www.rihk.no/
Home colours	Away colours

Franchise history
- 1934–1991: Rosenborg BK Ishockey
- 1991–2014: Rosenborg IHK
- 2024–Present: Rosenborg IHK

Rosenborg Ishockeyklubb Elite (RIHK) is a Norwegian ice hockey club located in Trondheim, Norway. In March, 2010, Rosenborg IHKE was promoted to the GET-ligaen, but the senior department of the club is currently inactive following a bankruptcy in 2014. Several people involved in the organization went on to found a new Trondheim-based club, Nidaros Hockey, in 2014. In 2024, Rosenborg IHK was refounded and brought back to the Norwegian ice hockey leagues by Marius Kristofferson.

== History ==
Because of the 2012 NHL lockout, Jack Skille of the Florida Panthers signed with RIHK. Skille did not receive any wages from Rosenborg and was the first NHL player to go to Norway during the lockout.

The elite department of Rosenborg ceased operations in the summer of 2014, following a long period of economic problems.

== Season-by-season results ==
This is a partial list of the last five seasons completed by Rosenborg. For the full season-by-season history, see List of Rosenborg IHK Ishockey seasons.

Norwegian Champions	Regular Season Champions	Promoted	Relegated

Season	League	Regular season										Postseason
Season	League	GP	W	L	T	OTW	OTL	GF	GA	Pts	Finish	Postseason
2009-10	1. divisjon	34	31	0	3	—	—	230	57	65	1st	2nd in Qualifying for Eliteserien
2010–11	Eliteserien	45	12	28	—	2	3	118	189	43	8th	Lost in Quarter-finals, 0–4 (Sparta)
2011–12	Eliteserien	45	14	27	—	3	1	113	165	52	8th	Lost in Quarter-finals, 0–4 (Stavanger)
2012–13	Eliteserien	45	9	27	—	3	6	132	196	39	9th	1st in Qualifying for Eliteserien
2013–14	Eliteserien	45	11	28	—	2	4	118	188	41	8th	Lost in Quarter-finals, 0–4 (Stavanger)^{1}

^{1} Rosenborg failed to renew its professional license to play in the GET-liga. The vacant spot was given to Manglerud Star.

== Final roster ==
As of March 2nd, 2014.

Goaltenders
Number		Player	Catches	Born	Place of Birth
30	(Norway)	Peter Strøm	-	01.01.1994	Trondheim, Norway
34	(United States)	Brady Hjelle	L	03.05.1990	International Falls, United States

Defensemen
Number		Player	Shoots	Born	Place of Birth
2	(Norway)	Frederic Viggen	L	02.02.1995	Trondheim, Norway
6	(United States)	Jamie Milam	R	13.05.1984	Lake Orion, United States
12	(Canada)	Wade Bergman	L	09.09.1990	Calgary, Canada
14	(Norway)	Thomas Wiig	L	11.03.1983	Trondheim, Norway
15	(United States)	Jack McNamara	L	30.01.1990	Chesnut Hill, United States
23	(Norway)	Sigve Bråten	L	25.05.1994
27	(Norway)	Markus Noteng	L	20.01.1994	Trondheim, Norway
48	(Norway)	Joakim Erbe	L	22.05.1990	Trondheim, Norway
61	(Norway)	Joakim Hjelm	L	23.04.1992	Stavanger, Norway

Forwards
Number		Player	Shoots	Born	Place of Birth
8	(Norway)	Inge Stokvik	R	27.12.1981	Trondheim, Norway
13	(Norway)	Ørjan Næss	-	12.03.1981	Trondheim, Norway
26	(Norway)	Emil Holst Volden	L	26.03.1991	Trondheim, Norway
28	(United States)	Jordan George	L	20.08.1990	Madison, United States
50	(Norway)	Steffen Ratejczak	-	26.10.1995
54	(United Kingdom)	Lou Dickenson	L	15.08.1982	Orleans, Canada
71	(Norway)	Niklas Unger Nilsen	L	07.04.1992	Trondheim, Norway
78	(Norway)	Joakim Hofstad	-	15.09.1995
89	(Sweden)	Carl Gustafsson	L	23.10.1989	Puerto Rico
93	(Norway)	Christer Greaker	R	05.04.1991	Fredrikstad, Norway
97	(Norway)	Markus Dahl	-	20.04.1997
