= Sparta Amfi =

Ice hockey venue in Sarpsborg, Norway

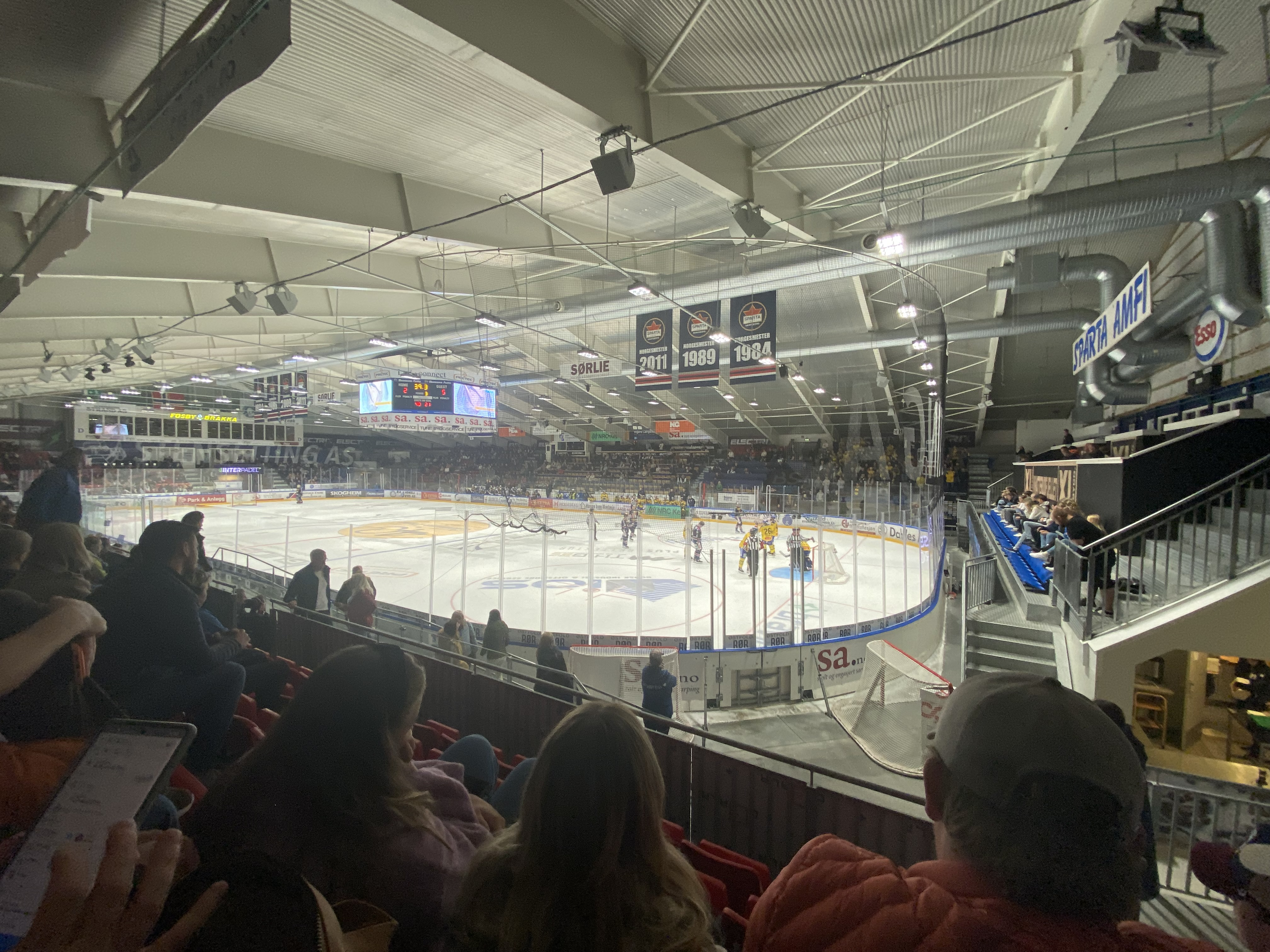
- Interactive map of Sparta Amfi
- Location: Sarpsborg, Norway
- Coordinates: 59.2808°N 11.0885°E
- Owner: Sarpsborg Municipality
- Capacity: 3,900

Construction
- Groundbreaking: 13 June 1962
- Built: 1962–63
- Opened: 18 October 1963
- Renovated: 2006, 2012
- Expanded: 2007
- Cost: NOK 2.6 million
- Main contractor: Betong-Anlegg

Tenants
- Sparta Sarpsborg (ice hockey); Sarpsborg Skøyteklubb (Figure Skating)

Website
- www.sparta.no/arena/

Sparta Amfi is an indoor ice hockey rink located in Sarpsborg, Norway. The 3,900-spectator venue is the home of Sparta Sarpsborg and Sarpsborg Skøyteklubb. The arena opened in 1963 as the first indoor ice rink in Norway. Major upgrades were carried out in 2006 and 2012, and a second rink opened in 2007.

== History ==
IL Sparta took initiative to start an ice hockey club in 1958 and invited to a public meeting on 28 October at Festiviteten. This meeting spurred interest both for an ice hockey team, but also for the construction of an indoor ice hockey venue. The sports council was contacted and IL Sparta proposed that a municipal rink be built at Torsbekkdalen, next to Sarpsborg Stadion. However, the site was found to be unsuitable, both of economic and technical reasons. In November 1959 the club's annual meeting approved that it start an ice hockey team. At first an outdoor, natural ice stadium was built next to the football field at Brevik, for which the state funded NOK 6000. However, the club was not satisfied with the venue and started planning an indoor site. The outdoor rink was kept operation until the end of the 1964 spring season.

The club approached Jordal Amfi in Oslo, at the time an outdoor arena which had the only artificial ice in Norway, as well as a series of Swedish artificial rinks. Sparta's board considered various proposals in October 1960 and the project was given the go ahead by the annual meeting at the end of the year, with the goal of building an indoor, artificial rink. Designs were made in a 1 hectare (2.5 acres) lot next to Sparta's football field was bought. The contractor bids were revealed on 1 April 1961 and Betong-Anlegg was chosen as the main contractor. Construction commenced on 13 June 1962, costing NOK 2.6 million. The official opening took place on 18 October 1963, making Sparta Amfi the first indoor ice rink in Norway.

At first most of the venue had only standing room, giving a capacity for 6,000. Seats were offered only in two sections. This was later increased to five, allowing 1,600 seated spectators, but reducing the overall capacity to 4,000. By 1990 the club considered the need for a second ice surface. Various proposals were designed, and the club settled on a prospect whereby a new arena was built next to the existing structure. At first the southern end was proposed, but complaints from neighbors resulted in the eastern end being selected. The second rink, named Hafslund Ungdomshall ("Hafslund Youth Hall"), was completed in January 2007. The second rink was the thirty-fourth indoor ice rink in Norway. The upgrade also saw the installation of luxury suites in the main arena, as well as a new cafeteria and various sports facilities for Sparta, new locker rooms and an area for players to meet the press. This gave a configuration for 1,572 seated and 2,135 standing spectators, for a total of 3,707.

Another upgrade was carried out in 2012. The refrigerating system needed replacing, and the entire floor surface was lowered 1-meter (3 ft 3 in) to allow for additional seats on the sides. The northern stands were completely rebuilt with standing place for 1,000, and the southern stands were upgraded to seating, giving a total capacity of 3,900. The upgrades also improved accessibility and new public toilets. The upgrades cost NOK 31 million.

== Facilities ==
The venue is owned by Sarpsborg Municipality. It has a configuration for 3,900 spectators. The venue is certified as a class-A hall, allowing it, among other events, to host playoff finals.

== Events ==
Sparta Amfi is iced from early August to mid March. The venue is used both by elite and recreational hockey teams. Tenants include Sparta Warriors, IL Sparta, Borgen IK, Varteig IK and Kråkene IL. The ice rink is also well used by the figure skaters in Sarpsborg Skating Club (Sarpsborg Skøyteklubb). Sparta's bandy division also uses the venue for trainings before Sarpsborg Stadion receives ice. During daytime the venue is often used by schools.

== See also ==
- List of indoor arenas in Norway
- List of indoor ice rinks in Norway
