= EliteHockey Ligaen =

Norwegian ice hockey league

- Current season, competition or edition: 2025–26 EliteHockey Ligaen season
- Formerly: 1. divisjon (1934–1990); Eliteserien (1990–2004); UPC-ligaen (2004–2006); GET-ligaen (2006–2020); Fjordkraftligaen (2020-2023); EliteHockey Ligaen (2023-)
- Sport: Ice hockey
- First season: 1934–35
- No. of teams: 10
- Country: Norway
- Most recent champion: Storhamar (8th title)
- Most titles: Vålerenga (26 titles)
- Broadcaster: TV 2 Sport
- Relegation to: First Division
- Website: www.ehl.no

EliteHockey Ligaen (EHL) is the premier Norwegian ice hockey league, organised by the Norwegian Ice Hockey Association. It comprises 10 clubs and works on the premise of promotion and relegation, in which the two teams who placed last must play the top two teams from First Division (the league ranked immediately below) for the rights to play in the next Eliteserie season.

Teams from the EHL can participate in the IIHF's annual Champions Hockey League (CHL), competing for the European Trophy. Participation is based on the strength of the various leagues in Europe (excluding the European/Asian Kontinental Hockey League). Going into the 2022–23 CHL season, the EHL was ranked 11th among leagues in Europe, allowing them to send their top team to compete in the CHL.

== History ==
The Norwegian Ice Hockey Association (NIHF) was founded on 16 September 1934. The same season also saw the debut of a national league for ice hockey. It was then known as 1. divisjon (1st division), a name it held until 1990, when the elite clubs broke away and formed a new top league, Eliteserien (The Elite League). In 2004, telecommunications company UPC bought the naming rights for the league. UPC Norway changed its name to GET in 2006 and hence the name of the league was also altered. On October 1, 2020, NIHF and Fjordkraft announced that a new three years naming rights agreement for the league had been agreed. From the 2023–2024 season, the league dropped a sponsorship name and became known as EliteHockey Ligaen.

== Teams ==
Eliteserien teams
Eliteserien teams (Greater Oslo Region)

Team	City	Arena	Capacity
Teams in the 2025–26 season
Frisk Asker	Asker	Varner Arena	3,650
Lillehammer	Lillehammer	Eidsiva Arena	3,194
Lørenskog	Lørenskog	Lørenskog Ishall	1,350
Narvik	Narvik	Nordkraft Arena	1,400
Nidaros	Trondheim	Leangen Ishall	3,000
Sparta Sarpsborg	Sarpsborg	Sparta Amfi	4,000
Stavanger Oilers	Stavanger	DNB Arena	4,377
Stjernen	Fredrikstad	Stjernehallen	2,473
Storhamar	Hamar	CC Amfi	7,500
Vålerenga	Oslo	Nye Jordal Amfi	5,300

=== Notable former teams ===
- Bergen
- Forward/Gamlebyen
- Furuset
- Grüner
- Hasle-Løren
- Lørenskog
- Manglerud Star
- Narvik
- Rosenborg (defunct)
- Trondheim Black Panthers (defunct)
- Tønsberg Vikings
- Spektrum Flyers (defunct)
- Kongsvinger Knights
- LM-90 (defunct)
- Stavanger-Viking (defunct)
- Viking IK (defunct)
- Lambertseter hockeyklubb (defunct)

== Season structure ==
The Eliteserien season is divided into a regular season, lasting from mid September to the first week of March, and a postseason, consisting of the Norwegian Championship playoffs, and qualification for the league in the following season. During the regular season, clubs play each other in a predefined schedule. The Norwegian Championship, which is contested in March and April, is an elimination tournament where two clubs play each other in a best-of-seven series in order to advance to the next round. The final remaining team is crowned the Norwegian champion. Teams not qualified for the playoffs must compete with the best teams from the second league level—1. divisjon—for the right to play in next season's EHL.

=== Regular season ===
The league's regular season is organized according to a quintuple round robin format implemented ahead of the 2008–09 season. Clubs play each other five times, at least twice at home and twice away, for a total of 45 games per team. The right to play the fifth game at home is awarded on a rotational basis determined by the final standings in 2007–08. The five highest ranked clubs were awarded a third home game in 2008–09; the other five clubs would then get an extra home game in 2009–10, and from then on, every other season. However, because of the bankruptcy of Comet in October 2009 and reduction to nine teams for that season, a sixth round robin was added to the schedule so that all teams played an equal number of home and away games, amounting to 48 in total.

Points are awarded for each game, where three points are awarded for a win in regulation time, two points for win in overtime or a shootout and one point for a loss in overtime or a shootout. No points are awarded for a loss in regulation time. Teams are ranked by total points; if two or more teams have an equal number of points, they are separated using head to head records, then goal difference head to head and goals scored head to head. If two or more teams are still ranked equally, goal difference and goals scored in all 45 games are used to break the tie. At the end of the regular season, the team that finishes with the most points is crowned league champion.

=== Playoffs ===
The Norwegian Ice Hockey Championship, or playoffs, is contested by the eight best teams in the league following the conclusion of the regular season. There are three rounds, each played as a best-of-seven series; the winner advances to the next round, while the loser is eliminated from the tournament. In the first round, or quarter-finals, the highest seed chooses which of the two lowest seeds to be matched against. The highest remaining seed then chooses between the two lowest remaining seeds until all teams have an opponent. In the second round, or semi-finals, the teams are re-seeded, with the highest remaining seed again being allowed to choose which of the two lowest remaining seeds to play against. The remaining teams pair off in the other semi-final, and the winner of each series advances to the finals.

In each round the higher-ranked team is said to be the team with the home ice advantage. Four of the seven games are played at this team's home venue—the first and third, and, when necessary, the fifth and seventh games—with the other games played at the lower-ranked team's home venue. In the finals, the team with the most points during the regular season is given home-ice advantage.

=== Relegation ===
The two lowest ranked teams after the regular season are in danger of being relegated and will have to play in a qualification tournament along with the two highest ranked teams from the 1. divisjon. All four teams must agree to play in the Eliteserien (if promoted) before they are allowed to participate in qualifying. If a team is unable, for whatever reason, to make such a commitment, the position is offered to another team in the 1. divisjon. The tournament is played in March and is organized according to a double round robin format: each club plays the others twice, home and away, for a total of six games. The points system and ranking method used are the same as in the Eliteserien. At the end of the tournament, the winner and runner-up qualify for next season, while the other two are demoted to (or remain in) the 1. divisjon.

== Trophies and awards ==
The winning team of the playoffs is awarded the Kongepokal, commonly known as "Bøtta". The Norwegian Ice Hockey Federation and the teams' organization (NTH) also announce a number of awards, among others Gullpucken (the best Norwegian player of the season, regardless of league) and the Most Valuable Player from the playoffs.

== Television and media ==
The league is broadcast by TV2 Norway. The games are also aired on the online platform TV2 Play.

== List of champions ==
- 1935 : Trygg
- 1936 : Grane
- 1937 : Grane
- 1938 : Trygg
- 1939 : Grane
- 1940 : Grane
- 1941–1945 : Not played
- 1946 : Forward
- 1947 : Stabæk
- 1948 : Strong
- 1949 : Furuset
- 1950 : Gamlebyen
- 1951 : Furuset
- 1952 : Furuset
- 1953 : Gamlebyen
- 1954 : Furuset
- 1955 : Gamlebyen
- 1956 : Gamlebyen
- 1957 : Tigrene
- 1958 : Gamlebyen
- 1959 : Gamlebyen
- 1960 : Vålerengen
- 1961 : Tigrene
- 1962 : Vålerengen
- 1963 : Vålerengen
- 1964 : Gamlebyen
- 1965 : Vålerengen
- 1966 : Vålerengen
- 1967 : Vålerengen
- 1968 : Vålerengen
- 1969 : Vålerengen
- 1970 : Vålerengen
- 1971 : Vålerengen
- 1972 : Hasle/Løren
- 1973 : Vålerengen
- 1974 : Hasle/Løren
- 1975 : Frisk
- 1976 : Hasle/Løren
- 1977 : Manglerud/Star
- 1978 : Manglerud/Star
- 1979 : Frisk
- 1980 : Furuset
- 1981 : Stjernen
- 1982 : Vålerengen
- 1983 : Furuset
- 1984 : Sparta
- 1985 : Vålerengen
- 1986 : Stjernen
- 1987 : Vålerengen
- 1988 : Vålerengen
- 1989 : Sparta
- 1990 : Furuset
- 1991 : Vålerenga
- 1992 : Vålerenga
- 1993 : Vålerenga
- 1994 : Lillehammer
- 1995 : Storhamar
- 1996 : Storhamar
- 1997 : Storhamar
- 1998 : Vålerenga
- 1999 : Vålerenga
- 2000 : Storhamar
- 2001 : Vålerenga
- 2002 : Frisk Asker
- 2003 : Vålerenga
- 2004 : Storhamar
- 2005 : Vålerenga
- 2006 : Vålerenga
- 2007 : Vålerenga
- 2008 : Storhamar
- 2009 : Vålerenga
- 2010 : Stavanger Oilers
- 2011 : Sparta Warriors
- 2012 : Stavanger Oilers
- 2013 : Stavanger Oilers
- 2014 : Stavanger Oilers
- 2015 : Stavanger Oilers
- 2016 : Stavanger Oilers
- 2017 : Stavanger Oilers
- 2018 : Storhamar
- 2019 : Frisk Asker
- 2020 : Playoff cancelled due to COVID-19 pandemic
- 2021 : Playoff cancelled due to COVID-19 pandemic
- 2022 : Stavanger Oilers
- 2023 : Stavanger Oilers
- 2024 : Storhamar
- 2025 : Storhamar
- 2026 : Storhamar

== Titles by team ==
Team in bold currently competes in the top league.

Titles	Team	Year
26	**Vålerenga**	1960, 1962, 1963, 1965, 1966, 1967, 1968, 1969, 1970, 1971, 1973, 1982, 1985, 1987, 1988, 1991, 1992, 1993, 1998, 1999, 2001, 2003, 2005, 2006, 2007, 2009
10	**Storhamar**	1995, 1996, 1997, 2000, 2004, 2008, 2018, 2024, 2025, 2026
9	**Stavanger Oilers**	2010, 2012, 2013, 2014, 2015, 2016, 2017, 2022, 2023
8	Forward (Note: Forward was known as Gamlebyen IF between 1948 and 1971.)	1946, 1950, 1953, 1955, 1956, 1958, 1959, 1964
7	Furuset	1949, 1951, 1952, 1954, 1980, 1983, 1990
4	Grane (Note: This club is no longer active.)	1936, 1937, 1939, 1940
4	**Frisk Asker**	1975, 1979, 2002, 2019
3	Hasle-Løren	1972, 1974, 1976
3	**Sparta Warriors**	1984, 1989, 2011
2	**Manglerud Star**	1977, 1978
2	**Stjernen**	1981, 1986
2	Tigrene (Note: Tigrene merged with Frisk Asker in 1969.)	1957, 1961
2	Trygg	1935, 1938
1	**Lillehammer**	1994
1	Stabæk	1947
1	Strong	1948

== Seasons ==
- 2003–04 Eliteserien season
- 2004–05 UPC-ligaen season
- 2005–06 UPC-ligaen season
- 2006–07 GET-ligaen season
- 2007–08 GET-ligaen season
- 2008–09 GET-ligaen season
- 2009–10 GET-ligaen season
- 2010–11 GET-ligaen season
- 2011–12 GET-ligaen season
- 2012–13 GET-ligaen season
- 2013–14 GET-ligaen season
- 2014–15 GET-ligaen season
- 2015–16 GET-ligaen season
- 2016–17 GET-ligaen season
- 2017–18 GET-ligaen season
- 2018–19 GET-ligaen season
- 2019–20 GET-ligaen season
- 2020–21 Fjordkraftligaen season
- 2021–22 Fjordkraftligaen season
- 2022–23 Fjordkraftligaen season
- 2023–24 EliteHockey Ligaen season

== See also ==
- List of ice hockey teams in Norway
- List of ice hockey rivalries in Norway
