= Bergenshallen =

Indoor ice hockey arena in Bergen, Norway

Coordinates: 60.3540242°N 5.3593326°E

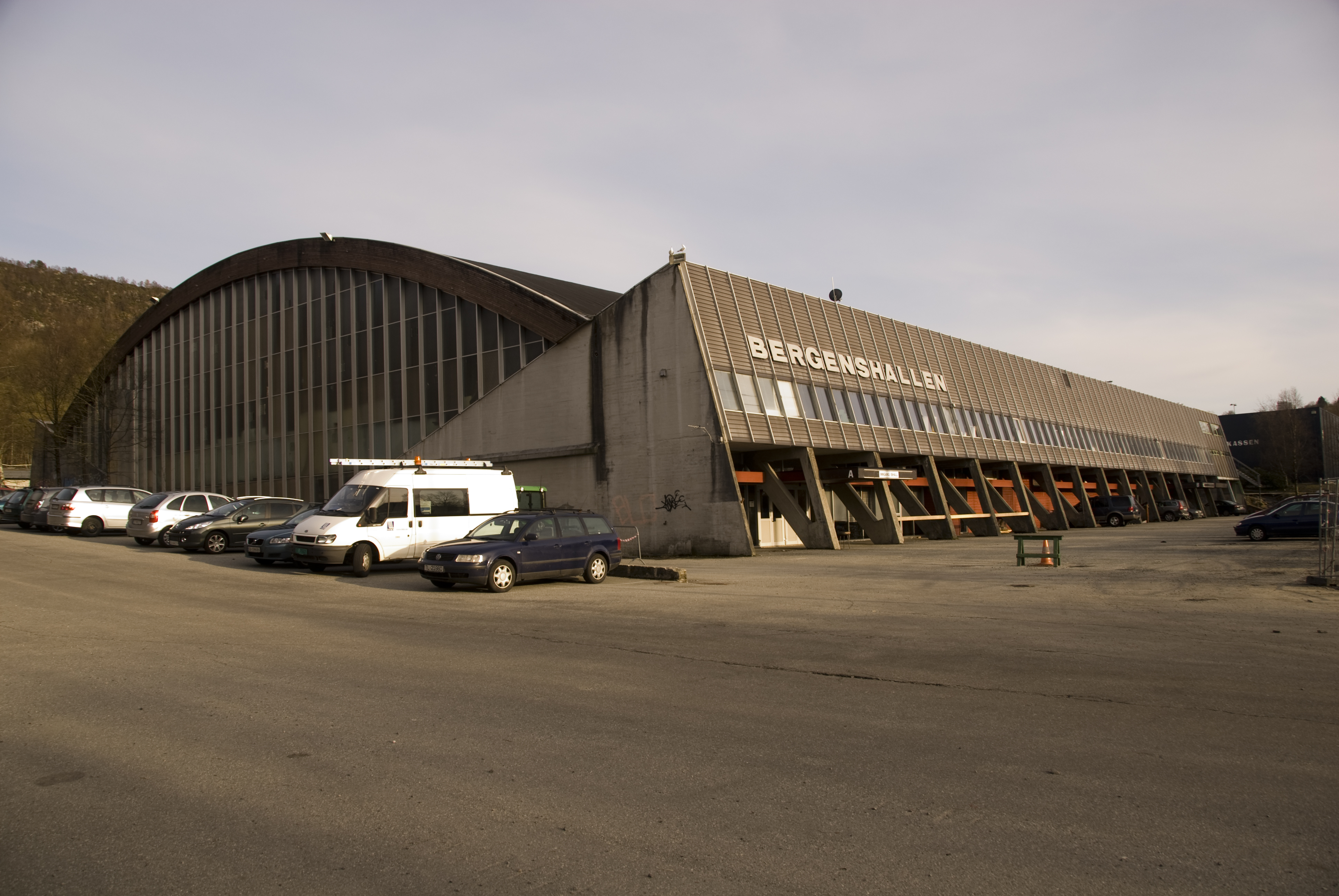
Bergenshallen

Bergenshallen is an indoor ice hockey arena in Bergen, Norway. It was built in 1968 and seats 1,800 people and has standing room for 1,200 more. The arena hosts the home games of the Bergen Flyers ice hockey team.
