= Tromsø Hockey =

Professional ice hockey team in Norway

Tromsø Hockey is an ice hockey team from Tromsø. Although under the Norwegian Ice Hockey Association, the team plays in the Swedish Ice Hockey Association's League 3. The team was founded on 9 March 2004 but played in a league for the first time in 2011–2012.

When the Norwegian Ice Hockey Association (NIHA) wanted to include a professional team from Northern Norway into the Norwegian league system, teams from South Norway rejected the proposal and threatened to withdraw due to increased travel. NIHA general secretary Jon Haukeland felt it challenging to integrate Tromsø, and collaborated with the Swedish Ice Hockey Association and Finnish Ice Hockey Association to find leagues for teams based on geography.

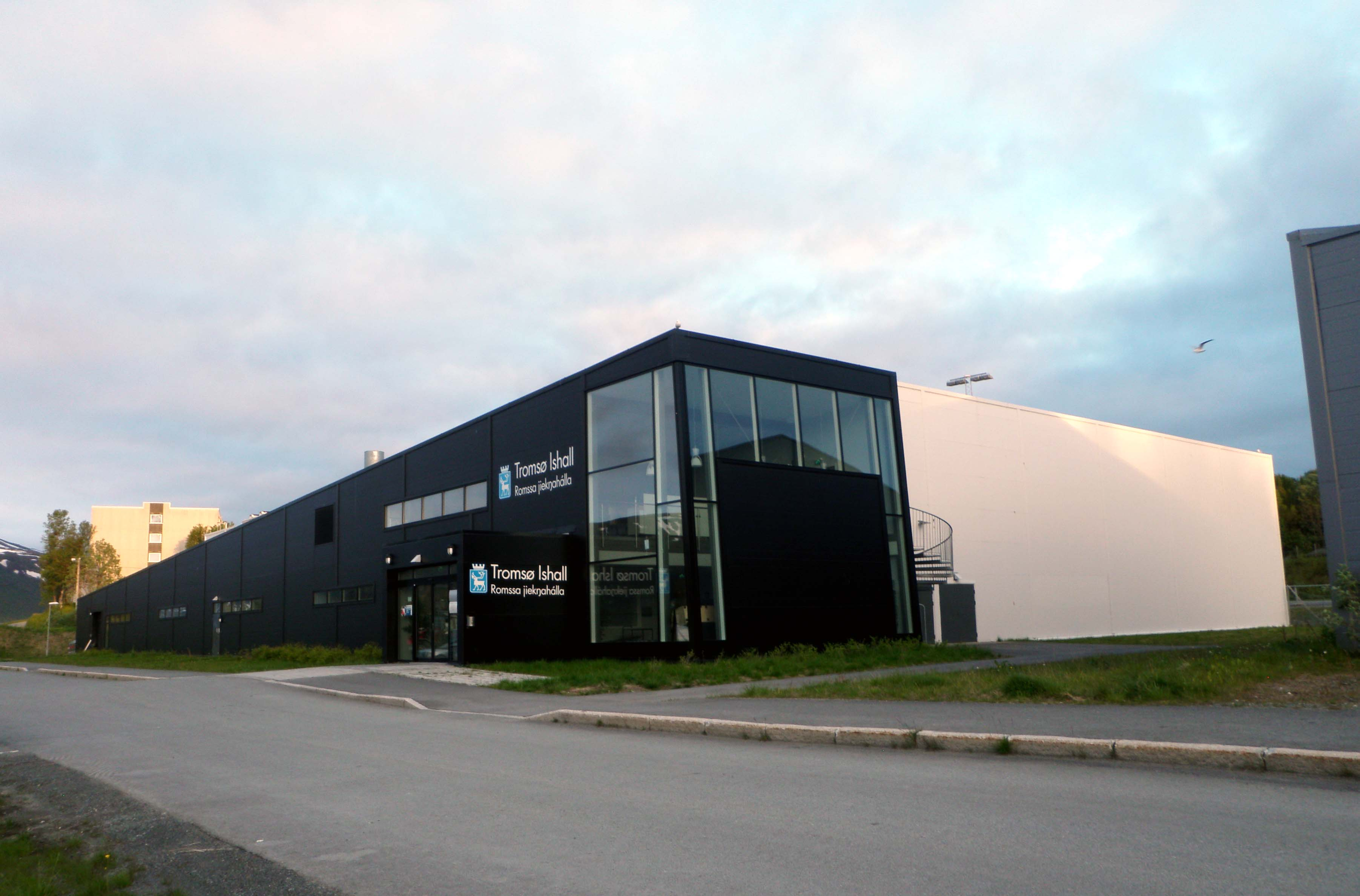
Tromsø Hockey trains at Tromsø Ishall

There are age-specific teams at every level of which three teams participate in Swedish Ice Hockey Association and one team participates in an international league, the Barents Hockey League.
