= Kongsvinger Ishall =

Indoor ice hockey arena in Kongsvinger, Innlandet, Norway

Coordinates: 60.2431°N 12.2256°E

- Interactive map of Kongsvinger Ishall
- Location: Kongsvinger, Innlandet, Norway
- Capacity: 2,000
- Surface: Ice

Construction
- Opened: 23 November 2013

Tenant
- Kongsvinger Knights

Kongsvinger Ishall is an indoor ice hockey arena located in the town of Kongsvinger in Kongsvinger Municipality in Innlandet county, Norway. The 2,000-seat arena is the home of the Kongsvinger Knights ice hockey team. The arena is located on the same spot as the former indoor ice hockey rink in Kongsvinger, Kongshallen.

== History ==
=== Kongshallen ===
Kongshallen, or the first Kongsvinger Ishall, opened 12 January 1992, as the 25. indoor ice hockey arena in Norway. The arena had a capacity of 550. In January 2013, the demolition of the arena started, to make place for a new and improved arena.

=== Kongsvinger Ishall ===
Nye Kongsvinger Ishall, or the second Kongsvinger Ishall, with improved facilities and a capacity of 2000, was opened 23 November 2013, by Kongsvinger mayor Øystein Østgaard In its first home match after the opening, on 30 November 2013, Knights defeated local rivals Nes IK 7–2, in front of a crowd of 1995 people.
