= Nes IK =

Norwegian Hockey team

- City: Nes, Akershus, Norway
- League: Norwegian First Division
- Founded: 1964
- Home arena: Runnirinken

Franchise history
- 1964-present: Nes IK

Nes IK was an ice hockey team in Nes, Akershus, Norway. They last played in the First Division, the second level of Norwegian ice hockey. Nes IK withdrew from the national league system in July 2016, following failure to meet league requirements.

== History ==
The club was founded on December 26, 1964. They played in the Norwegian First Division since the 2012-13 season. The women's team plays in the second-level women's Norwegian league.

== Notable players ==
- Jere Elo
