= Haugesund Seagulls =

- City: Haugesund, Norway
- League: 3. divisjon
- Founded: 2009; 17 years ago
- Home arena: Haugesund Ishall
- Colors: Light blue, dark blue, white
- Head coach: Teemu Elomo
- Website: http://seagulls.no/

Franchise history
- 2009–: Haugesund Seagulls

The Haugesund Seagulls are an ice hockey team in Haugesund, Norway. They currently play in the Third Division, the fourth level of Norwegian ice hockey. The teams plays its home games in the Haugesund Ishall.

== History ==
The club was founded on January 9, 2009.
