= Gjøvik Olympic Cavern Hall =

Ice hockey rink in Gjovik, Norway

- Fjellhallen
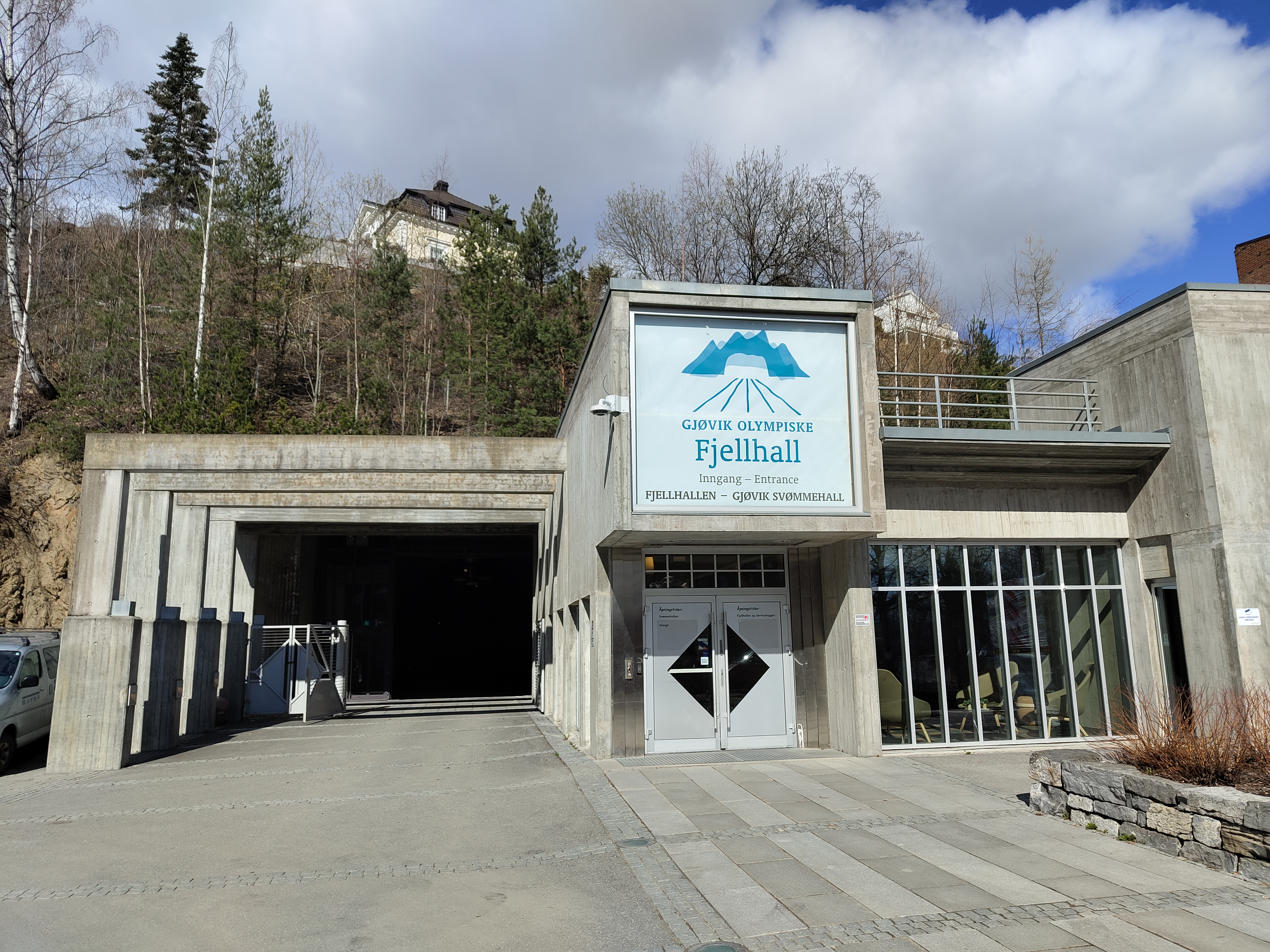
- Surface entrance to the Olympic Cavern Hall
- Interactive map of Gjøvik Olympic Cavern Hall
- Location: Gjøvik, Norway
- Coordinates: 60°47′35″N 10°41′05″E
- Owner: Gjøvik Municipality
- Capacity: 5,830

Construction
- Groundbreaking: 1 April 1991
- Opened: 6 May 1993
- Renovated: 2017
- Cost: 134.6 million kr
- Architect: Moe–Levorsen
- Structural engineer: Fortifikasjon

Tenant
- Gjøvik Hockey (1993–)

Gjøvik Olympic Cavern Hall (Norwegian: Gjøvik Olympiske Fjellhall or Fjellhallen) is an ice hockey rink located within a mountain hall in Gjøvik, Norway. With a capacity for 5,500 spectators, the hall also features a 25-meter swimming pool and telecommunications installations. Opened in 1993 and costing 134.6 million Norwegian krone (NOK), it was built for the 1994 Winter Olympics, where it hosted 16 ice hockey matches. It is the home of Gjøvik Hockey, has hosted the 1995 World Short Track Speed Skating Championships and is also used as an event venue. The structure is the world's largest cavern hall for public use.

== Construction ==
Because half the country's surface consists of exposed rock, Norway has a tradition of building mountain cavern halls for many purposes, from tunnels via power plants to sport centers. These often double up as bomb shelters. Gjøvik Municipality opened Norway's first underground swimming pool in 1974. The idea to build an underground ice rink came from Consulting Engineer Jan A. Rygh while having dinner with Municipal Engineer Helge Simenstad in 1988, after the latter said that Gjøvik had been awarded an ice rink for the Olympics. The first drafts were made on a napkin in the restaurant. An alternative proposal for a conventional rink was also made. Among the advantage of a cavern hall was that it would not take up valuable downtown property space or interfere with the town's cityscape, yet it would be centrally located which would reduce travel costs, and there would be a stable year-round natural temperature which would reduce cooling costs.

A budget was prepared by the Lillehammer Olympic Organizing Committee (LOOC) in December 1989, and in April 1990, the Parliament of Norway passed a grant. In October, LOOC and Gjøvik Municipality made an agreement to share the ownership of the venue. The municipal council took the decision to build underground on 24 January 1991 and the main planning was contracted to Fortifikasjon. Main architects were Moe–Levorsen. A research group was created, which had four main tasks: ventilation, energy, fire and safety; the environment; rock mechanism and geology; and laws and regulations. The group also made marketing information to promote Norwegian underground technology internationally. In preparation for construction, drilling samples were taken and sent to SINTEF and the Norwegian Geotechnical Institute for testing. The rock is 800 to 1,100 million year-old gneiss which is well suited for creating caverns. Computer models were created, and estimates were based on the Q-method.

Construction started on 1 April 1991. Several points of attack were created to get the most rational work-load. The first tunnel was created 10 meters (33 ft) below the level of the roof of the cavern. First the roof was blasted, then work started downwards. The first eight months were used for excavation, and 140,000 cubic meters (4,900,000 cu ft) of rock in 29,000 truckloads were removed. 170 tonnes (170 long tons; 190 short tons) of dynamite were used during blasting. The mass was used to build a new marina, a lake-side promenade and a parking facility. Throughout construction, surveillance was made continually of the rock, and the crown of the roof was measured to have settled 8 to 10 millimeters (0.31 to 0.39 in), which was as expected. Safety planning was done in cooperation with the National Office of Building Technology and Administration, and included the use of uninflammable materials, creation of sufficient fire exits.

The hall cost NOK 134.6 million, of which NOK 88.5 million was grants from the government. The hall opened on 6 May 1993, with a show televised on national television and with 5,000 guests. It was the 29th indoor ice hockey rink in Norway, and the world's largest cavern hall for public use. At the time of opening, the venue was estimated to incur an operating cost of NOK 3 to 4 four million, and an operating deficit of NOK 1.7 million. To finance this, the state established a fund similar to other Olympic venues, but the fund only received NOK 1 million, and the rest of the operating costs would have to be taken by the municipality. The venue is owned through Gjøvik Olympiske Anlegg, originally owned 70% by Gjøvik Municipality and 30% by Lillehammer Olympiapark, but later taken entirely over by the municipality.

== Facilities ==
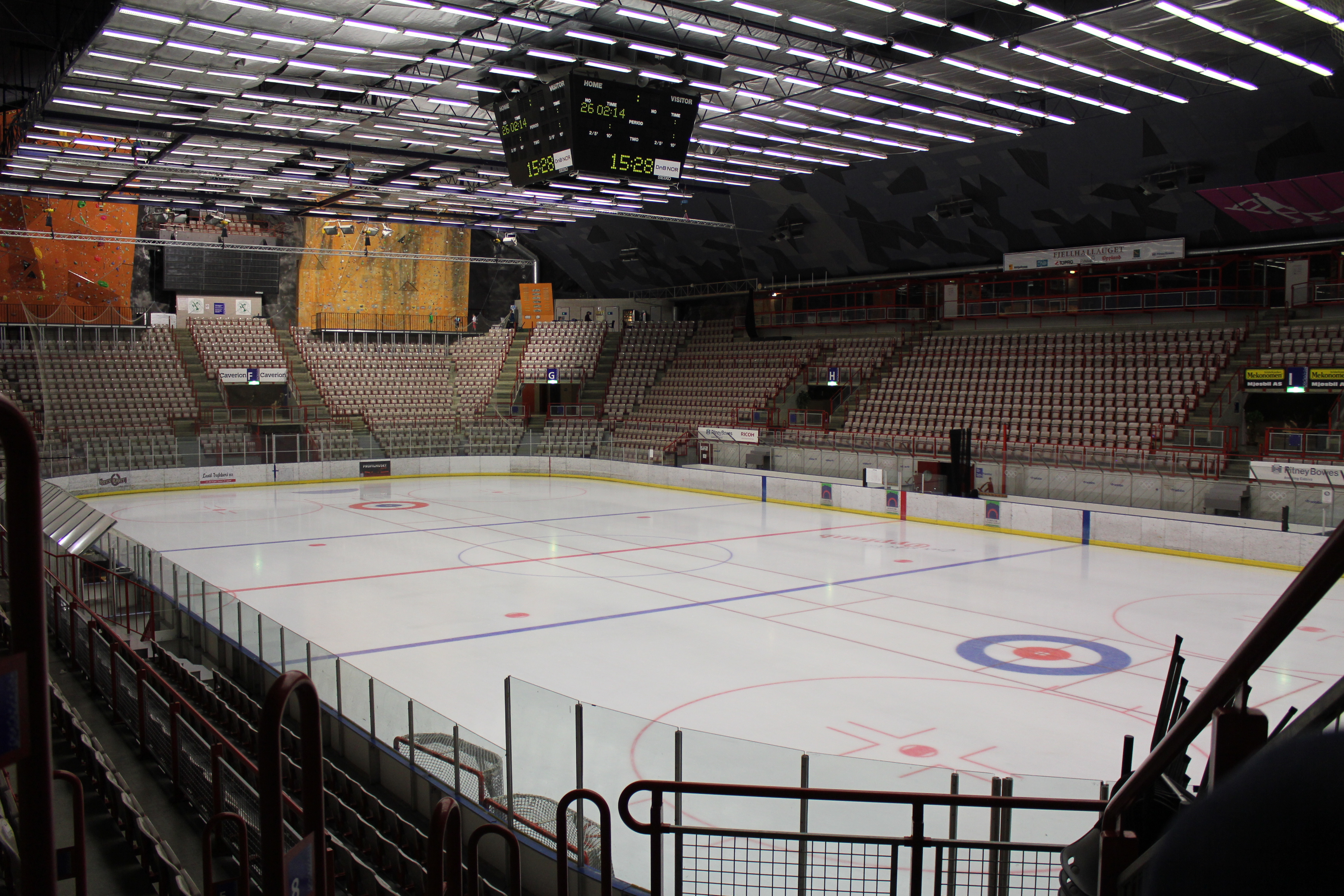
The rink

The facility is located just west of the town center of Gjøvik, with the main hall 120 meters (390 ft) into the mountain. It is covered by 25 to 55 meters (82 to 180 ft) of bedrock. In addition to a main hall, there is a swimming pool, a cafeteria and a telecommunications facility operated by Telenor. The main hall is designed as a multi-use venue, and can feature indoor football, handball, basketball, volleyball, rifling and tennis, as well as concerts, dining and events.

The gross area of the complex is 14,910 square meters (160,500 sq ft), while the net area is 10,010 square meters (107,700 sq ft). The stadium covers 1,965 square meters (21,150 sq ft), the public areas cover 2,224 square meters (23,940 sq ft), the media center covers 2,110 square meters (22,700 sq ft), the participant facilities cover 263 square meters (2,830 sq ft), the administrative and VIP facilities cover 577 square meters (6,210 sq ft), and the operations, management, technical, electrical and storage facilities cover 2,253 square meters (24,250 sq ft). The main hall cavern has is 61 meters (200 ft) wide, 91 meters (299 ft) long and 25 meters (82 ft) high. Seating capacity for the ice rink is 5,800, although it was 5,300 during the Olympics. The grandstands have a safety area under them; in case of a fire, spectators can be evacuated to these areas where they would remain until evacuation is safe. The hall duplicates as a civil defense facility, and is designed to withstand nuclear, conventional and gas attacks.

The Olympic venues were designed to reflect Norwegian culture and character. The hall was designed to play on Scandinavian folklore, such as the Hall of the Mountain King in Henrik Ibsen's Peer Gynt and the caves of fairy-tale trolls. This has for instance been emulated through the use of shotcrete on the walls to give a dark and mysterious impression. Lighting is used to create high contrast, such as from the entrance which is dark with pools of light, to the main hall which is brightly lit, to emphasize its size. The dark entrance is also used to adjust the spectators' eyes so the main hall seems brighter. A contrast has also been used between the grandstands' slender lines and the coarse finish of the cavern rock. Red was chosen as the hall's main color because of natural occurrence of red in the rock. Glass tiles are used as they give associations to ice. Ventilation, energy and other installations use shine metal, representing silver embedded in the rock. The main hall is designed as an amphitheater with close contact between spectators and athletes.

== Events ==
Since the opening, the venue has hosted Gjøvik Hockey, which started in 1993 in the Fourth Division. During the 1994 Winter Olympics, Gjøvik Olympic Cavern Hall hosted 16 ice hockey matches between 12 and 26 February, including two quarter-finals and one semi-final. The remaining matches were played at the larger Håkons Hall in Lillehammer. In March 1995, the operator announced that the ice would remain throughout the year. Because of the natural cooling of the mountain, the operator saved 1,000 kilowatts in heating costs by reusing the cooling system to heat the rest of the cavern hall. On 4 April 1995, the venue was used to host an international match between Norway and Sweden.

Originally the 1995 World Short Track Speed Skating Championships was planned to take place at Hamar Olympic Amphitheatre in Hamar, the same venue which hosted short track speed skating at the 1994 Winter Olympics. However, because Storhamar was at scheduled time playing play-offs in the Norwegian Ice Hockey Championship, it was in December 1994 decided to move the tournament to Gjøvik. The championship opened on Friday 17 March with the 1500 meter races, and was followed by the 500 meter races the following day. The remaining events were held on 19 March. It is the only time the world championship has been held in Norway. There were set six world records during the championship. Chae Ji-hoon's time 4:56.29 in the men's 3000 meter and Chun Lee-kyung at 5:02.18 in the women's 3000 meter. Kim Yun-mi set the record on the women's 500 meter at 45.33 in an introductory race, while Frederic Blackburn set a world record at 2:19.71 in the semi-final of the 1500 meter. Both the relay teams also set world records: Canada with the men's record at 7:09.76 and the China with the women's at 4:26.68. The hall was one of seven venues used during the group state of the 1999 World Women's Handball Championship. The arena hosted short track speed skating at the 2016 Winter Youth Olympics.

== See also ==
- List of indoor arenas in Norway
- List of indoor ice rinks in Norway
