= Moss Hockey =

- City: Moss, Norway
- League: 1. divisjon
- Founded: 20 November 1950; 75 years ago
- Home arena: Moss Ishall
- Colors: Yellow, black
- Head coach: Arild Syversen
- Captain: Lennart Christoffer Hjemgård
- Website: http://www.kraakene.no/

Moss Hockey are an ice hockey team in Moss, Norway. The official name of the club is Idrettslaget Kråkene. They currently play in the First Division, the second level of Norwegian ice hockey.
