= Tønsberg og Omegn Ishockeyklubb =

- City: Tønsberg, Norway
- League: 2. divisjon
- Founded: 1963; 63 years ago
- Home arena: Tønsberg Ishall
- Colors: Red and white
- Website: http://toik.no/

Tønsberg og Omegn Ishockeyklubb is an ice hockey club based in Tønsberg, Norway. The team's colours are red and white; and home games are played at Tønsberg Ishall. The club has mostly competed in the two highest tiers of Norwegian hockey. The elite level of the team is occasionally known as Tønsberg Vikings. The club experienced economic difficulties during the summer of 2016. The team was moved down a division in August 2016, but was promoted again the following season.

== History ==
Tønsberg og Omegn Ishockeyklubb was founded on 4 April 1963. For most of its history, the club competed in the lower divisions of Norwegian ice hockey, never reaching beyond the third tier.

Logo used by the Tønsberg Vikings

In 2002, the club set itself the goal of becoming an established team in the 1. divisjon by 2006. For many years, Tønsberg had focused on developing youth players; with the first team at the time languishing in the 3. divisjon, these players invariably moved elsewhere upon reaching a certain age.

Canadian Dave Flanders was hired as head coach ahead of the 2002–03 season, and would also play for the team. It took three games for the Vikings to record their first win, and the campaign was dealt a decisive blow four rounds from the end of the season when they lost 5–6 to Holmen. Tønsberg eventually finished in sixth place with 14 points from as many games. Flanders stepped down after the season; his successor as player-coach, Lars Oddvard Fjeldvang, later maintained that the Canadian had gotten the most out of a mediocre team.

Fjeldvang coached the Vikings during the 2003–04 season. He succeeded where Flanders had not, largely due to a better roster. The team recorded a run of 11–2–2 to finish on 24 points; enough to claim first place and a historic promotion to the 2. divisjon.

During the off-season, the club formed a limited company to manage commercial activities and improve finances. Morten Sandø, a member of the team since 2002, was appointed player-coach and later also head of marketing. Three experienced players were brought in to reinforce the team ahead of its first outing in the 2. divisjon. By mid-season, half that team had been lost to injury, transfer or other, forcing the management to rely on junior team members to fill the roster. At the cost of the junior team's performance, the first team eventually finished fifth.

In the following seasons, the Vikings struggled at the bottom of the standings. Despite having advanced to the third tier of the league system, the club continued to lose its most talented young players. The lack of a regional ice hockey academy meant that national youth team players from Tønsberg were still moving to Bærum or Oslo when they entered high school. From 2006 to 2008, the club did not have enough eligible players for a separate junior team. In his second and final season as head coach, Sandø also criticized the team's inability to adopt a proper training culture. For the 2006–07 season, Sandø handed over the reins to Jimmy Svensson, who failed to make an impact.

With the appointment of Andreas Toft as head coach in 2007, a concerted effort began to lift the club up to a higher level, both on and off the ice. As the club's first full-time head coach, Toft was inexperienced at only 25 years of age, but had achieved positive results with Jutul's juniors from 2005 to 2007. By the 2008–09 season, a more robust management was in place to support him, and which succeeded in bringing several former junior team members back to the club, as well as signing the former Czech professional Jiri Jantovsky. A successful campaign ensued, in which the Vikings won the 2. divisjon—and promotion—with a 16–1–1 record.

In 2012, the club qualified for the GET-ligaen for the first time in club history, and managed to stay there for the two following seasons. Due to the struggling economy, the board of the Tønsberg Vikings asked that the team be moved down one division before the 2014-15 season.

On 16 August 2016, Tønsberg Vikings announced that its elite department would cease operations. A new senior section was established on the third tier, and it achieved promotion the season after.

== Season-by-season record ==
This is a partial list of the last five seasons completed by the Tønsberg Vikings. For the full season-by-season history, see List of Tønsberg Vikings seasons.

Norwegian Champions	Regular Season Champions	Promoted	Relegated

Season	League	Regular season									Postseason
Season	League	GP	W	L	OTW	OTL	GF	GA	Pts	Finish	Postseason
2013–14	Eliteserien	45	3	37	3	2	90	227	17	10th	2nd in Qualifying for Eliteserien^{1}
2014–15	1. divisjon	36	28	6	0	2	239	119	85	1st	3rd in Qualifying for Eliteserien
2015–16	1. divisjon	36	27	8	0	1	168	71	82	1st	3rd in Qualifying for Eliteserien^{2}
2016–17	2. divisjon	24	20	2	2	0	170	43	42	1st	1st in Qualifying for 1. divisjon
2017–18	1. divisjon	32	6	18	5	3	102	149	31	7th	Did not qualify

^{1}Due to struggling economy, the board of the Tønsberg Vikings asked that the team was to be moved down one division. The vacant spot was given to Kongsvinger Knights.
^{2}Due to struggling economy, the board of the Tønsberg Vikings asked that the team was to be moved down one division. The vacant spot was given to Gjøvik Hockey.
