= Tønsberg Ishall =

Ice hockey arena in Tønsberg, Norway

Coordinates: 59.2821°N 10.4094°E

- Interactive map of Tønsberg Ishall
- Capacity: 400
- Surface: ice

Construction
- Opened: 1995

Tenants
- Tønsberg Vikings; Tønsberg Turnforening

Tønsberg Ishall is an ice hockey- and figure skating arena in Tønsberg, Norway. Opened in 1995, it is home to the Tønsberg Vikings of the GET-ligaen and Tønsberg Turnforening figure skating branch. It is on the same site as the Maier Arena Tønsberg, an outdoor artificial ice skating rink used for Speed skating.

In January 2003 it was the host arena for the Norwegian figure skating championships.
