= Dælenenga idrettspark =

Sports facility in Oslo, Norway

Dælenenga
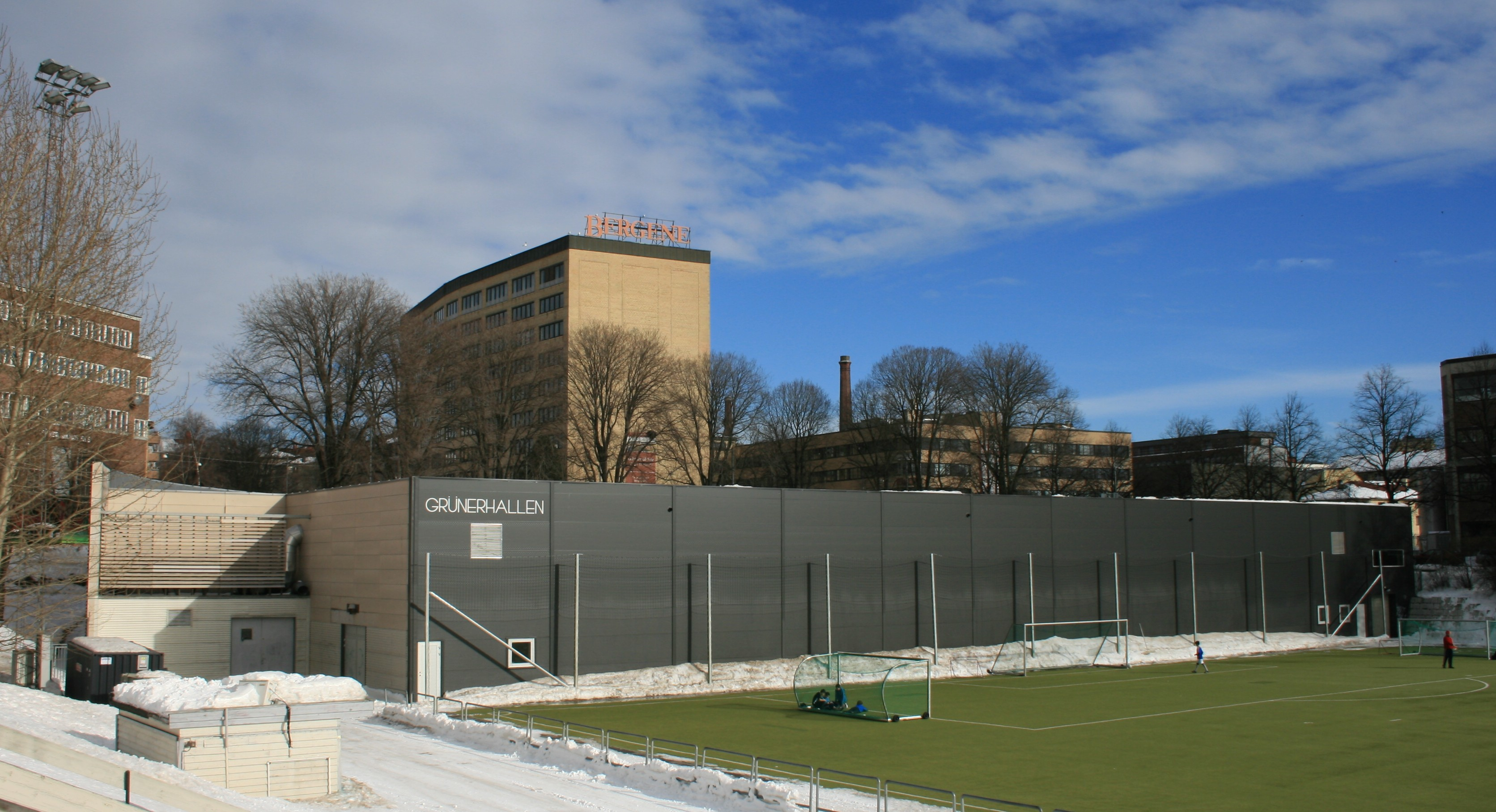
- Grünerhallen in March 2010
- Interactive map of Dælenenga
- Full name: Dælenenga idrettspark
- Location: Grünerløkka, Oslo, Norway
- Coordinates: 59°55′35″N 10°45′52″E
- Owner: Municipality of Oslo
- Surface: Artificial turf (football)

Construction
- Groundbreaking: 1915
- Opened: 1916
- Renovated: 1929, 1947, 1985, 1995, 1997

Tenants
- Grüner IL (football and ice hockey); Sportsklubben av 1909 (wrestling and boxing); Fighter Kickboxingklubb (kickboxing)

Dælenenga idrettspark is a sports facility located at Grünerløkka in Oslo, Norway. It consists of an artificial turf football pitch, a club house and an indoor ice rink—Grünerhallen. The facilities are owned by the Municipality of Oslo and used and operated by Grüner IL, the local sports club.

The venue opened in 1916 and was originally used for football, athletics and speed skating. The club house was completed in 1928 and has since been used for martial arts. From 1929, a velodrome course was installed, which remained in use until 1940. During the 1930s, the venue was the main Oslo stadium for the Workers' Sports Federation (AIF). A speedway course was installed in 1947 and remained in use until 1968. The venue featured eight ice hockey matches and two bandy matches during the 1952 Winter Olympics. Artificial ice was laid in 1985 and the skating hall opened in 1995, two years before the artificial turf was laid.

== History ==
Construction started in 1915. The stadium opened in 1916 as a combined football and athletics venue with a capacity for 10,000 spectators. The track was iced during winter and used for speed skating. Dælenenga was one of two multi-sport venues serving eastern Oslo, along with Jordal Idrettspark. The club house, used for wrestling and boxing, opened in 1928. The following year, the ice rink was decommissioned and a velodrome was instead installed, which remained in use until 1940. During the Second World War, the club house was used as a school.

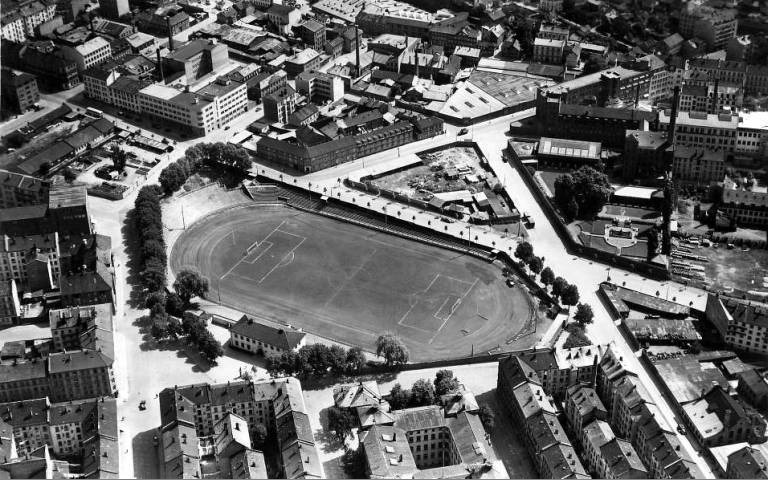
Aerial view from 1951

In 1947, the velodrome was removed and the track converted for use for speedway. For the 1952 Winter Olympics, the venue was upgraded with a new ice hockey clock, a new lighting system and new ice hockey boards. The speedway course was dismounted in 1968. During the 1980s, the stadium became a central location for drug dealing, but the traffic moved away during the 1990s. In 1985, artificial ice was laid north of the football pitch, costing 2.1 million Norwegian krone (NOK). Of this, NOK 1.3 million was financed by Grüner IL through loans. At the same time a new gravel pitch was laid on the football field.

The artificial ice increased the popularity of playing ice hockey in the neighborhood. The club therefore started working on plans to build an indoor ice rink over the artificial rink. Planning of the hall started in 1989, and in 1990 a proposal for a steel structure was launched. However, it was rejected by the municipality. The club therefore hired Einar Dahle Arkitekter to work on a new design, resulting in area planning regulations being passed in 1991. Financing of the steel structure had been secured in loans, but these were stopped following a credit crunch. In 1994, the municipality initiated a redevelopment program of the downtown residential areas, which included grants to build Grünerhallen. The hall was estimated to cost NOK 23.4 million and the contract was awarded to Mur 6 Tax. Construction started in March 1995 and the venue opened on 6 October 1995, as the 30th indoor ice rink in Norway. In 1996, the city council had to grant an additional NOK 4.6 million to cover cost overruns.

Ahead of 1997, the municipal council granted NOK 3.2 million to lay artificial turf at Dælenenga. Construction started in May and the pitch was taken into use on 4 September 1997. The new turf was Belgian-manufactured, sand-filled Superfoot 32. The upgrade also saw the first upgrades to the terraces in the stadium's history. New artificial turf was laid in 2008.

== Facilities ==
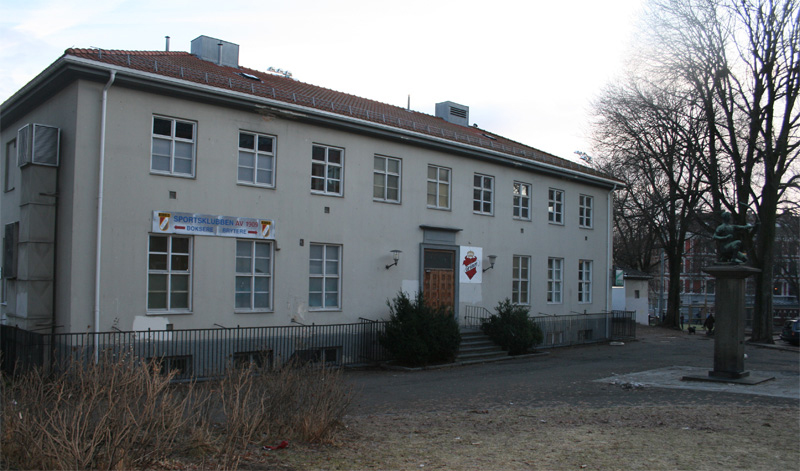
The club house

Dælenenga idrettspark consists of a club house, an artificial turf football pitch and an indoor ice rink. The venue is owned by Oslo Municipality, but the day-to-day operation is undertaken by Grüner IL, the main tenant. The park covers an area of 16.1 hectares (40 acres). The football pitch has artificial turf and measures 100 by 64 meters (109 by 70 yd). The club house has a floor area of 900 square meters (9,700 sq ft) and is built in brick. The building has suffered under lack of maintenance and has been subject to water damage, although the outer walls and foundation are in good condition. The club house has an impractical floor plan, and contains gyms for martial art and changing rooms for the pitch.

Grünerhallen has a single 30-by-60-meter (98 by 197 ft) ice rink. It has a capacity for 200 sitting and 400 standing spectators and features six player and two referee change rooms. The hall's lighting produces 600 lux. The building also features a weight lifting room, a cafeteria and club offices. Dælenenga idrettspark is 1.5 kilometers (1 mi) from downtown Oslo and is located on Ruter bus route 30 and close to the light rail station Birkelunden on the Grünerløkka–Torshov Line.

== Events ==
During the late 1920s and 1930s, Dælenenga was dominated by the Workers' Sports Federation (AIF) and served as its main stadium in Oslo. AIF's Grünerløkka chapter was established at Dælenenga and used it as its training ground. Dælenenga was used for major AIF tournaments and the largest tournament took place 5 July 1929, with 500 participants. It also served as the terminus of many of AIF's and other labor movement parades. Each May Day the stadium would be packed. From the early 1930s, AIF moved its largest tournaments to Jordal. The local AIF club was particularly good at boxing, and in 1937 gathered thousands of spectators to watch a boxing match at Dælenenga.

From the 1920s to 1946, the Østkantstafetten relay race was held with start and finish at Dælenenga. The route ran through various streets in eastern Oslo and was a counter-measure to Holmenkollstafetten in the western part of town. From 1929 Dælenenga became a center of velodrome cycling. During the Second World War, Dælenengen was used for sports training in football and handball by the German Wehrmacht. After the war ended, the clubs in the neighborhood went through a consolidation process. In 1952, the clubs Spero, Strong and B-14 merged to create Grüner IL, which became the dominant club at the venue. Speedway events took place between 1947 and 1968, with Dælenenga growing to become a prime national venue, especially during the 1950s. The most notable regular local drivers were Basse Hveem, Henry Andersen, Werner Lorentzen and Aage Hansen.

As of 2012, Grüner Fotball remains the football venue's tenant. Their main football team plays in Third Division. Grüner Hockey uses the hockey rink, with their main men's team playing in the First Division. The club house is used by Sportsklubben av 1909, Grüner IL and Fighter Kickboxingklubb.

=== Speed skating ===
The first speed skating competition took place on 24 January 1917, and the stadium remained in use for speed skating until 1929. AIF arranged their Norwegian championships in speed skating at Dælenenga in 1926 and 1929. Finland's Clas Thunberg set two unofficial world records in 1,000 meters of 1:31.60 twice in 1921.

Speed skating track records
Distance	Time	Date	Athlete	Nationality
500 m	43.9	28 February 1929	Hugo Nygren	Norway
1000 m	1:31.6	23 February 1921	Clas Thunberg	Finland
1500 m	2:24.5	6 March 1921	Clas Thunberg	Finland
5000 m	8:37.0	6 January 1918	Ole Mamen	Norway
10000 m	18:34.7	26 January 1929	Hans Engnestangen	Norway
Combined	202.512	26–27 January 1929	Hans Engnestangen	Norway

=== 1952 Winter Olympics ===
Dælenenga was one of five ice hockey rinks used during the 1952 Winter Olympics. Hosting 8 of 37 matches, it the second-most use venue after Jordal Amfi. It was also the only hockey venue other than Jordal to be located in Oslo.

Ice hockey matches during the 1952 Winter Olympics
Date	Winning team	Score	Losing team
15 February	Sweden	9–2	Finland
16 February	Czechoslovakia	6–0	Norway
17 February	Switzerland	6–3	Poland
18 February	Canada	11–0	Poland
21 February	Canada	11–2	Switzerland
22 February	United States	5–3	Poland
23 February	Canada	11–2	Norway
24 February	Switzerland	6–3	Germany

Bandy was arranged as a demonstration sport at the 1952 Winter Olympics. Two of the three matches were conducted at Dælenenga.

Bandy matches during the 1952 Winter Olympics
Date	Winning team	Score	Losing team
20 February	Finland	3–2	Norway
21 February	Norway	2–1	Sweden

=== Motorcycle speedway ===
The venue hosted significant speedway events from 1947 to 1968. It staged qualifying rounds of the Speedway World Championship in 1953, 1954, 1957, 1960 and 1961 and the finals of the Norwegian Individual Speedway Championship in 1948, 1958, 1965 and 1966.
