= Grüner Ishockey =

Ice hockey club in Oslo

- City: Oslo, Norway
- League: 1. divisjon
- Founded: 1914; 112 years ago
- Home arena: Grünerhallen
- Colors: Purple and black
- General manager: Trond-Erik Larsen
- Head coach: Marius Bjerke
- Website: grunerhockey.no

Championships
- Playoff championships: 1

Grüner Ishockey is an Oslo-based ice hockey club, and a part of the Grüner IL multi-sports club. They play their home games in Grünerhallen.

In the last season they played, the 2023-24 season, they placed 3rd.

== History ==
The men's ice hockey team currently plays in 1. divisjon, the second level of Norwegian ice hockey. It contested playoffs to possibly win promotion to the highest league after the 2007–08 season and after the 2009–10 season, but did not prevail. The ice arena is named Grünerhallen. Dælenenga idrettspark was formerly used as an outdoor ice rink, hosting ice hockey at the 1952 Winter Olympics.
