= Ringerike Panthers =

- City: Hønefoss, Norway
- League: EliteHockey Ligaen
- Founded: 1974; 52 years ago
- Home arena: Schjongshallen
- Colors: Black, yellow and white
- General manager: Tor Frithjov Nerby
- Head coach: Martin Boork
- Captain: Dennis Ryttar
- Website: ringerikepanthers.no

Franchise history
- 1974–2001: Ringerike IK
- 2001–: Ringerike Panthers

The Ringerike Panthers are a Norwegian professional ice hockey team in Hønefoss, Norway. Since 2026, they play in the EliteHockey Ligaen, the top highest level of Norwegian ice hockey. The team plays its home games in the Schjongshallen.

== History ==
The club was founded on December 14, 1974. They took on the name Panthers in 2001.
