= Gjøvik Hockey =

- City: Gjøvik, Norway
- League: 1. divisjon
- Founded: 1990; 36 years ago
- Home arena: Gjøvik Olympic Cavern Hall
- Colors: Blue, gold, navy blue, white
- Head coach: Patrik Bäärnhielm
- Captain: Cato Ødegard
- Affiliate: Lillehammer (GET-ligaen)
- Website: http://www.gjovikhockey.no/

Gjøvik Hockey is an ice hockey team based in Gjøvik, Norway. They play in the First Division with Gjøvik Olympic Cavern Hall as their home arena.

== History ==
Gjøvik Hockey was founded in 1990, following the construction of the Gjøvik Olympic Cavern Hall for the 1994 Winter Olympics. The team had established itself on the second tier of Norwegian hockey, but was moved down to the third tier in 2011. In August 2016, Gjøvik Hockey was moved back up to the second tier following the withdrawal of Tønsberg Vikings from the league.
