= Leangen Ishall =

Ice hockey arena in Trondheim, Norway

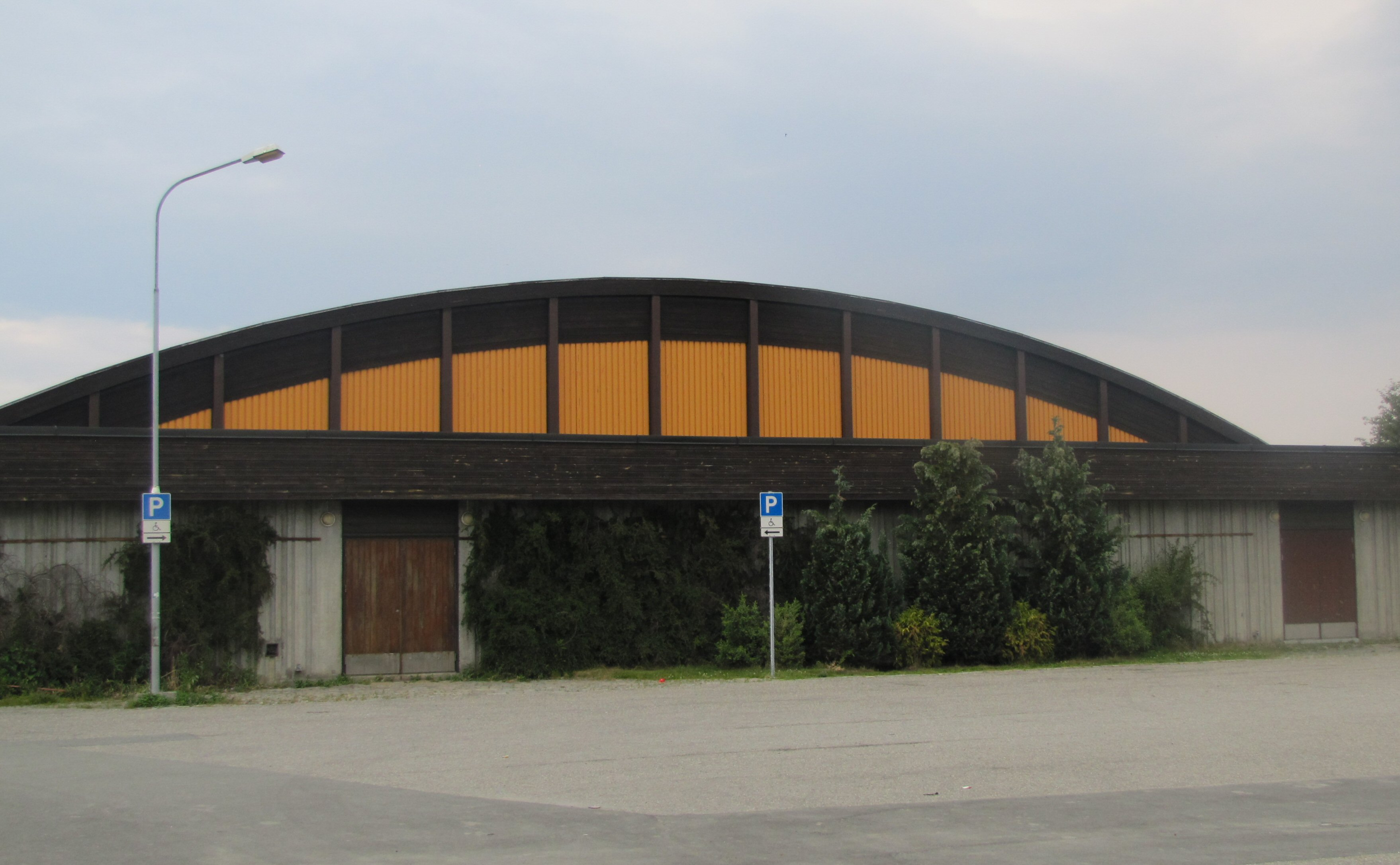
- Interactive map of Leangen Ishall
- Location: Trondheim, Oslo, Norway
- Coordinates: 63°25′40″N 10°27′58″E
- Owner: Trondheim Kommune
- Capacity: 3,000
- Surface: Ice
- Public transit: Gartnerhallen, AtB lines 10, 15; Leangen Station, Trønderbanen

Construction
- Opened: 1977

Tenants
- Trondheim Black Panthers (–2008); Rosenborg IHK (–2014); Nidaros Hockey (2015–present)

Leangen Ishall is an indoor ice hockey arena located in Leangen, Trondheim, Norway. The capacity of the arena is 3,000 and it was opened in 1977. It is the home arena of the Nidaros ice hockey team. The arena also hosted the home games of the Trondheim Black Panthers and Rosenborg ice hockey team.

Located next to the arena is Leangen Kunstisbane an outdoor long track artificial speed skating oval constructed in 1979.
