= Bergen IK =

Ice hockey team from Bergen, Norway

Bergen Hockey Elite
- City: Bergen, Norway
- League: 2.divisjon
- Founded: 1980; 46 years ago
- Home arena: Bergenshallen
- Colors: Red and white
- General manager: Christian Lund
- Head coach: Pål Erik Glomsaas
- Website: http://www.bergenhockey.no/

Franchise history
- 1980–2015: Bergen IK
- 1986–1990: Bergen/Djerv
- 1996–2005: Bergen Flyers
- 2015-: Bergen Hockey Elite

Bergen Ishockeyklubb is an ice hockey club from Bergen.

== History ==
Bergen Flyers were elite commitment to the club until 2005. Elite team's history went back to the hockey team to the Sportkluben Djerv, which changed its name in turn to "Bergen / Djerv" (in 1986, in cooperation with BIK), "Bergen Hockey Club" (BIK) (for bankruptcy and complete a merger with BIK) and finally "Bergen Flyers" (by moving and merging with the Oslo club Spektrum Flyers. Djerv was 1 division a few years in the mid 1980s as the legendary hockey player Bear "Botta" Skaare played for the club. Bergen Flyers were back in the top division in the season 2004 / 2005. Bergen Flyers went bankrupt in 2005 and no longer exists. Bergen Hockey Club now has a team in 1st division.

Bergen Ice Hockey Club located in the Bergenshallen at Slettebakken in the Årstad district of Bergen. Bergenshallen has the nickname "bathtub".

In June 2017, the Norwegian Ice Hockey Association withdrew the club's licence after its failure to meet league requirements and economic requirements. The team was moved down a division, and started the 2017-18 season in 2. divisjon.
