= Narvik IK =

Norwegian ice hockey team

Narvik Hockey
- City: Narvik, Norway
- League: EliteHockey Ligaen
- Founded: 1962; 64 years ago
- Home arena: Nordkraft Arena
- Colors: Blue, black, white
- General manager: Martin Persson
- Head coach: Henry Acres
- Captain: Viktor Jörnevik
- Website: http://www.narvikhockey.no/

The Narvik Arctic Eagles, commonly known as Narvik Hockey, is an ice hockey team based in Narvik, Norway.

== History ==
The club was established in 1962, which makes it the oldest club in northern Norway. In the 2011–12 season, they participated in the Swedish Division 3, the fifth level of ice hockey in Sweden. They joined the Norwegian First Division for the 2012–13 season.

In the season 17/18 they became first division champions and qualified for playoffs for Get Ligaen(Top division). They ended up on 3rd place in a playoff tournament consisting of the last and second to last teams in the Get ligaen (Stjernen Hockey and Kongsvinger Knights) and the 2nd place in first division(Ringerike Panthers)

End result playoffs qualification to Get Ligaen 17/18 1st Stjernen hockey (relegated) 2nd Ringerike Panthers (relegated) 3rd Narvik Hockey (Stays in 1 division) 4th Kongsvinger Knights (Demoted to first division)
