= Kongsvinger Knights =

Kongsvinger IL Icehockey
- City: Kongsvinger, Norway
- League: 2. divisjon
- Founded: 1961; 65 years ago
- Home arena: Kongsvinger Ishall
- Colors: Red, black, white
- General manager: Linus Rolinder
- Head coach: Marius Bjerke
- Website: http://www.knights.no/

Kongsvinger IL Icehockey is a Norwegian ice hockey team based in the town of Kongsvinger in Kongsvinger Municipality in Innlandet county, Norway. The senior teams play in 2. divisjon.

== History ==
=== The beginning ===
The club was created on 27 January 1961 by Rolf E. Johnson, John Bie-Larsen, Ola Norstrøm. Odd Smedstad, Terje Martinsen and Trond Dahl. They started out by setting up a lottery, which managed to collect 80 kr. The money was used on goalie gloves. In 1961 the hockey team was accepted into the multi sports club Kongsvinger IL, by a vote that ended 19 to 1.

On 14 January 1962, Kongsvinger their first ever game, a friendly against Skarnes hockey club at Gjemselund stadium. Skarnes led 0–2, but goals from KIL players Harald Riisnæs and Odd Norstrøm balanced the match. In the third period, two goals from John Bie-Larsen and Trond Dahl, made sure Kongsvinger achieved victory in the premiere. Kongsvinger was later accepted into the Norwegian Ice Hockey Federation, and eventually became an established team in the third division.

=== 2. divisjon and natural ice ===
During the 1980s, the players Tore Wålberg and Fred Pedersen arrived, and the club saw increased success. The club was eventually promoted to the second division. There were some thrilling matches, especially one notable match against Bergen, which drew about 400 spectators watching from a pile of snow on Gjemselund.

However, as the team was promoted the club faced increased requirements from the hockey association, such as an indoor arena with suitable standards. Kongsvinger was eventually relegated again, but became the last team in the top two divisions of Norway to play on natural ice.

The club then went into a decline which lasted until 1992, when an indoor arena was built. This made sure Kongsvinger could reestablish itself as an ambitious hockey club. In 2004, Kongsvinger was again promoted to the second tier division, now named 1. divisjon.

=== In 1. divisjon ===
The team has won the 1. divisjon once (during the 2008/09 season), and has reached the playoffs for the GET-league three times, in 2009, 2010 and 2014. In 2013 the club also moved from the old, aging Kongshallen, in to a new and modern arena.

== Season-by-season record ==
This is a partial list of the last five seasons completed by the Kongsvinger Knights. For the full season-by-season history, see List of Kongsvinger Knights seasons.

Norwegian Champions	Regular Season Champions	Promoted	Relegated

Season	League	Regular season									Postseason
Season	League	GP	W	L	OTW	OTL	GF	GA	Pts	Finish	Postseason
2013–14	1. divisjon	36	25	4	3	4	169	81	85	2nd	4th in Qualifying for Eliteserien^{1}
2014–15	Eliteserien	45	2	39	1	3	73	272	11	10th	2nd in Qualifying for Eliteserien
2015–16	Eliteserien	45	4	39	1	1	67	225	15	10th	2nd in Qualifying for Eliteserien
2016–17	Eliteserien	45	1	41	0	3	61	243	6	10th	2nd in Qualifying for Eliteserien
2017–18	Eliteserien	45	3	35	4	3	90	218	20	10th	4th in Qualifying for Eliteserien

^{1}Due to struggling economy, the board of the Tønsberg Vikings asked that the team was to be moved down one division. The vacant spot was given to Kongsvinger Knights.
