= Nidaros Hockey =

- City: Trondheim, Norway
- League: EliteHockey Ligaen
- Founded: 2015; 11 years ago
- Home arena: Leangen Ishall
- Colors: Light teal, black, white
- Head coach: Victor Wallson
- Asst. coach: Roger Harli
- Captain: David Hallström
- Website: http://www.nidaroshockey.no/

Nidaros Hockey is an ice hockey team in Trondheim, Norway. They currently play in the EliteHockey Ligaen, the first level of Norwegian ice hockey. The team plays its home games in the Leangen Ishall.

== History ==
Following the bankruptcy of Rosenborg IHK in 2014, the city of Trondheim was left without a team in the two highest ice hockey leagues of Norway. In an attempt to bring back an elite hockey team to Trondheim, Nidaros Hockey was founded in the middle of 2015.

On 12 March 2016, Nidaros Hockey was promoted to the 2016-17 First division, the second tier of Norwegian hockey.
