= 2009–10 GET-ligaen season =

- League: GET-ligaen
- Sport: Ice hockey
- Number of teams: 9 (10, but one folded)
- TV partner(s): TV 2 Sport
- Regular-season winner: Vålerenga
- Champions: Stavanger Oilers
- Season MVP: Tomi Pöllänen (FIN)
- Top scorer: Tomi Pöllänen (FIN)
- Promoted to First Division: Rosenborg

Playoffs
- Playoffs MVP: Robert Bina (USA)

GET-ligaen seasons
- ← 2008–09 season 2010–11 season →

The 2009–10 GET-ligaen was the 71st season of Norway's premier ice hockey league, Eliteserien (known as GET-ligaen for sponsorship reasons). The regular season began play on 12 September 2009 and concluded on 2 March 2010, with Vålerenga claiming their twenty-seventh League Championship after defeating Lillehammer 2–1 on 26 February. Vålerenga won the league twelve points ahead of the Sparta Warriors, who were defending champions. The league was contested by ten teams until Comet folded in October 2009, leaving nine teams to finish the regular season.

The playoffs to determine the 2010 Norwegian Ice Hockey Champions began on 4 March and ended on 19 April 2010. The Stavanger Oilers defeated Vålerenga by 4 games to 2 in the Final to win their first ever title.

== Regular season ==
In June 2009, the Norwegian Ice Hockey Association (NIHF) denied Comet entry into the league for the 2009–10 season due to the club's poor financial situation. This decision was subsequently reversed after an appeal by Comet. Less than two months later and shortly before the start of the season, the tax authorities in Halden successfully filed a bankruptcy claim against the club, the result being that they went into administration on 4 September. Comet had managed to pay roughly 1.1 million of the 2 million kroner they owed to the tax authorities at that point, but the district court felt that the club were unable to guarantee that the remaining debts would be paid off. Nonetheless, the administrator in charge of the bankruptcy suggested that there was a possibility of Comet being rescued, and the NIHF reaffirmed, amid protests from the other nine clubs, that Comet would be allowed to play in the top flight.

The possibility of coming out of administration rested on Comet's ability to earn income from home games, but due to an ongoing redevelopment of their home arena, the municipally owned Halden Ishall, the club were forced to play all their fixtures in September as away games. When an application for use of the arena as of October was denied because the building did not yet meet the fire safety code, the administrator declared on 2 October that the running of the club would have to discontinue. A last-ditch attempt by a group of local investors to save the club could not remedy the fact that Halden Ishall remained unavailable, and Comet folded on 6 October. This was the third bankruptcy in Norwegian top tier ice hockey in three years. All results involving Comet were annulled and a sixth round robin was introduced, bringing the total number of games per team up to 48.

Two clubs were penalized over the course of the season for using ineligible players. The Frisk Tigers were found to have fielded four such players during their opening match loss to the Stavanger Oilers on 12 September. For this, the NIHF issued a fine of 6,000 kroner and had the result of the game changed from 4–2 to 5–0 in favour of the Oilers. On 25 November, the Storhamar Dragons were found to have used an ineligible player during three games played that month, and were consequently handed a fine of 4,500 kroner. Again, the result of each match was set to 5–0 in favour of the opposing team. Two of the three teams, the Frisk Tigers and Stavanger Oilers, were thus awarded an extra three and two points respectively compared to their original results against the Dragons, while Stjernen received no extra points as they had already won their match.

=== Final standings ===
	Team	GP	W	OTW	SOW	OTL	SOL	L	Pts	PCT	GF	GA	PIM	Home	Away
1	Vålerenga (C)	48	25	6	3	2	3	9	98	68	162	107	840	16-4-3-1	9-5-2-8
2	Sparta Warriors	48	26	1	0	3	3	15	86	60	161	122	800	16-0-2-6	10-1-4-9
3	Stavanger Oilers	48	24	1	0	0	6	17	82	57	132	128	717	12-1-3-8	12-0-3-9
4	Lørenskog	48	20	1	7	3	2	15	81	56	166	155	902	10-5-3-6	10-3-2-9
5	Lillehammer	48	21	2	1	3	1	20	73	51	151	137	985	13-2-1-8	8-1-3-12
6	Stjernen	48	13	3	5	3	2	22	60	42	134	170	883	8-5-3-8	5-3-2-14
7	Manglerud Star	48	16	0	3	3	2	24	59	41	133	154	783	9-0-1-14	7-3-4-10
8	Storhamar Dragons	48	16	4	2	0	3	23	58	40	154	160	600	7-5-1-11	9-1-2-12
9	Frisk Tigers	48	12	2	2	3	1	28	51	35	121	181	911	8-1-3-12	4-3-1-16

GP = Games played; W = Wins; L = Losses; OTW = Overtime Wins; OTL = Overtime losses; SOW = Shootout Wins; SOL = Shootout losses; PCT = Percent of possible points; GF = Goals for; GA = Goals against; PIM = Penalties in minutes; Pts = Points; C = Champions
Source: pointstreak.com

=== Statistics ===
==== Scoring leaders ====
These are the top ten skaters based on points. If the list exceeds ten skaters because of a tie in points, all of the tied skaters are shown.

Player	Team	GP	G	A	Pts	+/–	PIM
(Finland) Tomi Pöllänen	Lillehammer	48	28	41	69	+19	70
(Norway) Jonas Solberg Andersen	Sparta Warriors	46	29	37	66	+19	26
(Canada) Marco Charpentier	Lørenskog	47	35	29	64	+9	46
(Norway) Knut Henrik Spets	Vålerenga	47	26	36	62	+23	32
(Sweden) Alexander Larsson	Sparta Warriors	48	22	38	60	+15	24
(Norway) Anders Fredriksen	Vålerenga	45	17	41	58	+25	26
(Norway) Pål Johnsen	Storhamar Dragons	48	17	41	58	0	26
(Norway) Martin Hansen	Manglerud Star	47	22	31	53	+10	10
(Sweden) Fredrik Abrahamsson	Lillehammer	46	19	33	52	+4	18
(United States) Justin Bostrom	Manglerud Star	46	21	29	50	+17	61
(Norway) Kenneth Larsen	Lørenskog	46	12	38	50	+8	36

GP = Games played; G = Goals; A = Assists; Pts = Points; +/– = Plus–minus; PIM = Penalty minutes

==== Leading goaltenders ====
These are the top five goaltenders based on goals against average.

Player	Team	GP	TOI	W	L	GA	SO	Sv%	GAA
(Canada) Patrick DesRochers	Vålerenga	47	2,860	33	14	100	2	91.7	2.10
(Finland) Antti Ore	Stavanger Oilers	41	2,417	21	18	93	4	91.5	2.31
(United States) Phil Osaer	Sparta Warriors	46	2,768	27	19	111	4	91.9	2.41
(Sweden) Alexander Bergh	Lillehammer	39	2,244	20	18	99	1	90.1	2.65
(Norway) Ruben Smith	Storhamar Dragons	38	2,177	17	19	104	0	91.0	2.87

GP = Games played; TOI = Time on ice (minutes); W = Wins; L = Losses; GA = Goals against; SO = Shutouts; Sv% = Save percentage; GAA = Goals against average

=== Attendance ===
For the 2009–10 season, the league attendance totaled 317,283 spectators for an average of 1,486. This was a 2.6% increase from the previous season's total of 309,332 spectators, and a rise of 6.8% in average attendance compared with the previous seasons's average of 1,374. The league recorded the highest average attendance since the 1992–93 season, which saw an average of 1,623 spectators during the second half of the Eliteserien (between the 1990–91 and 1993–94 season, the league was contested as two separate halves). It was also the first time since the 1994–95 season that attendance had averaged more than 1,400. Attendances rose for the fifth consecutive season.

Team	Arena	Capacity	Total	Games	Average	% of Capacity
Storhamar Dragons	Hamar OL-Amfi	6,091	45,685	24	1,903	31.2%
Vålerenga	Jordal Amfi	4,450	40,466	24	1,686	37.9%
Sparta Warriors	Sparta Amfi	3,450	64,202	24	2,675	77.5%
Lillehammer	Kristins Hall	3,194	36,269	24	1,511	47.3%
Stavanger Oilers	Siddishallen	2,664	40,008	24	1,667	62.6%
Stjernen	Stjernehallen	2,473	31,119	24	1,296	52.4%
Frisk Tigers	Askerhallen	2,400	28,553	24	1,189	49.5%
Manglerud Star	Manglerudhallen	2,000	9,272	24	386	19.3%
Lørenskog	Lørenskog Ishall	1,350	21,709	24	904	67.0%

Total	Games	Average
317,283	216	1,468

== Playoffs ==
After the regular season, the standard of eight teams qualified for the playoffs. In the first and second rounds, the highest remaining seed chose which of the two lowest remaining seeds to be matched against. In each round the higher-seeded team was awarded home ice advantage. Each best-of-seven series followed a 1–1–1–1–1–1–1 format: the higher-seeded team played at home for games 1 and 3 (plus 5 and 7 if necessary), and the lower-seeded team at home for games 2, 4 and 6 (if necessary).

The Final was contested between Vålerenga and the Stavanger Oilers. Vålerenga defeated Manglerud Star and the Storhamar Dragons to advance to the Final; Stavanger defeated Lørenskog and the Sparta Warriors. This was the second time the two teams had met in a final, the first being in 2006 when Vålerenga won their twenty-fourth Norwegian Championship, sweeping the Oilers 4–0 in the best-of-seven series. On this occasion, however, the Oilers defeated Vålerenga 4–2 to claim their first ever title, in the process also becoming the first club outside the traditional hockey powerhouse of Eastern Norway to win the championship.

Vålerenga, as league champions, were seeded first and enjoyed home ice advantage. They took a 1–0 lead in the series by winning the opening match at Jordal Amfi 5–4 in overtime. The hosts held the lead three times, before Stavanger staged a turnaround to 4–3 in the third period. With the score eventually tied at 4–4, the game went into overtime and was decided when Vålerenga and Mathias Trygg got the upper hand in a power play. Despite calls for interference, the goal was allowed. Stavanger responded by winning 4–3 at home in game 2, before being soundly beaten 0–5 in game 3.

The fourth game was the most closely contested in the series, being tied at 1–1 in regulation and won by the Oilers in double overtime. Nearly halfway into the first period of overtime, a breakaway goal by Stavanger's Juha Kaunismäki was controversially disallowed because none of the officials, including the goal judge, saw the puck go in. Footage provided by the broadcaster TV 2 showed the puck deflecting off the right post, the net inside the goal and finally the left post before being blocked by the goaltender. Since video refereeing is not allowed in Norwegian ice hockey, the footage could not be used and the game continued until Snorre Hallem scored 4 minutes and 38 seconds into the second overtime period to tie the series at 2–2. Following this incident, the NIHF decided to allow limited use of video replays for the remainder of the series, and will also consider the possibility of implementing video refereeing on a broader scale in the next season.

Game 5 became a turning point as Stavanger, needing to win at least once in Oslo, came back from a 0–2 deficit to tie the game with 23 seconds remaining on the clock, and then claim victory in overtime. Yet again, there were allegations of foul play, this time coming from Vålerenga, as Christian Dahl Andersen had scored the equalizer with his skate. However, the match officials agreed with Dahl Andersen that the skate was not actively used to score the goal. The result put the Oilers ahead 3–2 in the series, setting the stage for a possible championship deciding win at home in Stavanger. Indeed, in front of a packed audience in the Siddishallen, they defeated Vålerenga 4–0 to clinch the title.

=== Bracket ===
Quarter-finals
1	Vålerenga	4
7	Manglerud Star	1
2	Sparta Warriors	4
6	Stjernen	2
(Pairings are reseeded after the first round)
3	Stavanger Oilers	4
5	Lillehammer	2
4	Lørenskog	1
8	Storhamar Dragons	4

Semi-finals
1	Vålerenga	4
8	Storhamar Dragons	1
2	Sparta Warriors	2
3	Stavanger Oilers	4

Finals
1	Vålerenga	2
3	Stavanger Oilers	4

Source: pointstreak.com

Norwegian Champions
2010
Stavanger Oilers
1st title

=== Game log ===
2010 Norwegian Ice Hockey Championship Game Log
Quarter-finals

(1) Vålerenga vs. (7) Manglerud Star

4 March 2010; 18:30 CET	Vålerenga	6 – 2 (2–1, 0–0, 4–1)	Manglerud Star	Jordal Amfi, Oslo; Attendance: 1,009

Game reference

Patrick DesRochers
Goalies
Linus Fernström (out 56:08)
Steffen Søberg (in 56:08)
Referee:
Petter Hegle

Hesler (K.H. Spets, Lund) - 9:04	1 – 0
L.E. Spets (Lund, K.H. Spets) (PP) - 12:13	2 – 0
	2 – 1	19:32 - Bonk (Hansen, Skogli) (PP)
Kelly (L.E. Spets, Oppøyen) - 50:06	3 – 1
K.H. Spets (Lund) - 53:08	4 – 1
	4 – 2	53:18 - Bostrom (Hansen, Sundelius)
Lund (SH) - 55:11	5 – 2
Fredriksen (Nervik) - 56:08	6 – 2

10 min
Penalties
20 min
36
Shots
30

4 March 2010; 16:00 CET	Manglerud Star	3 – 4 (2–1, 1–2, 0–1)	Vålerenga	Manglerudhallen, Oslo; Attendance: 303

Game reference

Linus Fernström
Goalies
Patrick DesRochers
Referee:
Eirik Hansen

Sibley (Hansen, Heiberg) - 0:43	1 – 0
	1 – 1	10:42 - Fredriksen (Thoresen)
Bostrom (Hansen, Sundelius) - 13:58	2 – 1
	2 – 2	24:14 - Olsson (Stephenson, Fredriksen)
Skogli (Sibley, Santanen) (PP) - 30:29	3 – 2
	3 – 3	34:03 - Fredriksen (L.E. Spets, K.H. Spets) (PP)
	3 – 4	49:24 - Thoresen (Sørvik, Trygg)

10 min
Penalties
10 min
21
Shots
35

8 March 2010; 18:30 CET	Vålerenga	4 – 1 (2–0, 2–0, 0–1)	Manglerud Star	Jordal Amfi, Oslo; Attendance: 1,916

Game reference

Patrick DesRochers
Goalies
Linus Fernström (out 40:00)
Steffen Søberg (in 40:00)
Referee:
Eirik Hansen

Lund (K.H. Spets, Fredriksen) (PP) - 9:21	1 – 0
Nervik (K.H. Spets, Oppøyen) - 19:27	2 – 0
Nervik (K.H. Spets) - 27:16	3 – 0
Trygg (Werner, Thoresen) (PP) - 31:53	4 – 0
	4 – 1	58:18 - Frøshaug (Bonk, Skogli)

22 min
Penalties
38 min
27
Shots
32

10 March 2010; 18:30 CET	Manglerud Star	5 – 1 (0–0, 2–0, 3–1)	Vålerenga	Manglerudhallen, Oslo; Attendance: 409

Game reference

Steffen Søberg
Goalies
Patrick DesRochers
Referee:
Eirik Hansen

Bonk (Skogli, Bostrom) (PP2) - 25:32	1 – 0
Nygård (Bonk, Frøshaug) (PP) - 26:24	2 – 0
Hansen (Bostrom, Sundelius) - 41:22	3 – 0
Frøshaug (Johansson, Nygård) (PP) - 53:06	4 – 0
	4 – 1	54:00 - L.E. Spets (Stephenson, Lund) (PP)
Hansen (Bostrom, Santanen) (EN) - 56:11	5 – 1

30 min
Penalties
48 min
28
Shots
36

12 March 2010; 18:30 CET	Vålerenga	4 – 3 (2–0, 1–2, 1–1)	Manglerud Star	Jordal Amfi, Oslo; Attendance: 1,050

Game reference

Patrick DesRochers
Goalies
Steffen Søberg
Referee:
Lasse Westby

L.E. Spets (Stephenson, Lund) (PP) - 3:20	1 – 0
Lund (Stephenson, Fredriksen) - 8:57	2 – 0
L.E. Spets - 21:34	3 – 0
	3 – 1	26:22 - Bostrom (Bonk, Balan) (SH)
	3 – 2	35:36 - Nygård (Bonk, Santanen) (PP)
	3 – 3	42:13 - Bostrom (Bonk, Hansen)
Evans (Trygg, Espeland) (PP) - 48:05	4 – 3

12 min
Penalties
32 min
40
Shots
21

Vålerenga won series 4–1

(2) Sparta Warriors vs. (6) Stjernen

4 March 2010; 18:30 CET	Sparta Warriors	2 – 4 (2–3, 0–0, 0–1)	Stjernen	Sparta Amfi, Sarpsborg; Attendance: 2,421

Game reference

Phil Osaer
Goalies
Pål Grotnes
Referee:
Tommy Søstumoen

Kristiansen (Witnes, Lewerström) - 3:57	1 – 0
	1 – 1	7:27 - Paulsen (Selvaag, Hnat)
	1 – 2	9:58 - Selvaag (Paulsen, Hnat)
	1 – 3	10:33 - Höglund (Wessner, Juell)
Larsson (Kristiansen, Solberg Andersen) (PP) - 15:54	2 – 3
	2 – 4	59:27 - Höglund (Juntti, Juell) (EN)

8 min
Penalties
14 min
44
Shots
20

6 March 2010; 15:00 CET	Stjernen	1 – 4 (1–3, 0–0, 0–1)	Sparta Warriors	Stjernehallen, Fredrikstad; Attendance: 1,712

Game reference

Pål Grotnes
Goalies
Phil Osaer
Referees:
Ole Stian Hansen
Tommy Søstumoen

Qvistgaard - 1:45	1 – 0
	1 – 1	3:29 - Solberg Andersen (Larsson)
	1 – 2	7:13 - Kristiansen (Solberg Andersen, Witnes) (PP)
	1 – 3	12:04 - Wehn (Larsson, Solberg Andersen)
	1 – 4	55:08 - Kristiansen (Witnes, Roest)

32 min
Penalties
40 min
33
Shots
25

8 March 2010; 18:30 CET	Sparta Warriors	3 – 1 (0–0, 3–1, 0–0)	Stjernen	Sparta Amfi, Sarpsborg; Attendance: 2,522

Game reference

Phil Osaer
Goalies
Pål Grotnes
Referee:
Tor Olav Johnsen

Bøe (Solberg Andersen, Elofsson) - 32:31	1 – 0
	1 – 1	32:40 - Hnat (Weberg)
Elofsson (Larsson, Witnes) (PP) - 34:13	2 – 1
Solberg Andersen (Elofsson, Larsson) (PP) - 37:45	3 – 1

10 min
Penalties
12 min
29
Shots
22

10 March 2010; 18:30 CET	Stjernen	3 – 2 (0–1, 1–0, 2–1)	Sparta Warriors	Stjernehallen, Fredrikstad; Attendance: 1,247

Game reference

Pål Grotnes
Goalies
Phil Osaer
Referees:
Ole Stian Hansen
Roy Stian Hansen

	0 – 1	14:30 - Roest
Sochor - 27:12	1 – 1
Hnat (Sochor) - 52:50	2 – 1
	2 – 2	57:49 - Witnes (Solberg Andersen, Elofsson) (PP)
Selvaag (Juntti, Höglund) - 59:20	3 – 2

8 min
Penalties
2 min
34
Shots
32

12 March 2010; 18:30 CET	Sparta Warriors	4 – 1 (2–0, 1–0, 1–1)	Stjernen	Sparta Amfi, Sarpsborg; Attendance: 2,611

Game reference

Phil Osaer
Goalies
Pål Grotnes
Referee:
Ole Stian Hansen

Solberg Andersen (Larsson, Elofsson) (PP) - 8:24	1 – 0
Larsson (Solberg Andersen, Bøe) - 13:20	2 – 0
Solberg Andersen (Larsson, Elofsson) (PP) - 36:22	3 – 0
	3 – 1	47:59 - Hnat (Weberg) (PP)
Wehn (Lundbohm, Molin) - 50:44	4 – 1

14 min
Penalties
16 min
35
Shots
34

14 March 2010; 17:00 CET	Stjernen	1 – 2 (0–1, 1–0, 0–1)	Sparta Warriors	Stjernehallen, Fredrikstad; Attendance: 1,366

Game reference

Pål Grotnes
Goalies
Phil Osaer
Referees:
Ole Stian Hansen
Tommy Søstumoen

	0 – 1	17:08 - Solberg Andersen (Larsson, Elofsson)
Hnat (Selvaag, Sochor) - 35:03	1 – 1
	1 – 2	48:34 - Lundbohm (Molin, Wehn)

6 min
Penalties
6 min
43
Shots
28

Sparta won series 4–2

(3) Stavanger Oilers vs. (5) Lillehammer

4 March 2010; 18:30 CET	Stavanger Oilers	5 – 4 (1–0, 3–3, 1–1)	Lillehammer	Siddishallen, Stavanger; Attendance: 1,441

Game reference

Antti Ore
Goalies
Alexander Bergh
Referee:
Owe Lüthcke

Snorre Hallem (Sundin, Lehtonen) (PP) - 7:27	1 – 0
Hallem (Loikas, Solberg) (PP) - 21:09	2 – 0
Suoraniemi (Loikas, Strandfeldt) (PP2) - 24:14	3 – 0
	3 – 1	27:04 - Hay (Konsorada, Eidsæther) (PP)
	3 – 2	30:51 - Bakken (Abrahamsson, Sjödin) (PP)
	3 – 3	31:53 - Pöllänen (Hay, Eidsæther)
Bina (Loikas, Solberg) (PP2) - 39:15	4 – 3
	4 – 4	45:58 - Eidsæther (Pöllänen)
Strandfeldt (Bina, Solberg) (PP2) - 50:49	5 – 4

18 min
Penalties
20 min
33
Shots
15

6 March 2010; 16:00 CET	Lillehammer	2 – 0 (0–0, 1–0, 1–0)	Stavanger Oilers	Kristins Hall, Lillehammer; Attendance: 1,277

Game reference
Alexander Bergh	Goalies	Antti Ore	Referee: Owe Lüthcke
Pöllänen (Konsorada, Eidsæther) - 39:27 / 1 – 0; Eidsæther (Abrahamsson) (EN) - 59:36 / 2 – 0			Referee: Owe Lüthcke
8 min	Penalties	10 min	Referee: Owe Lüthcke
31	Shots	19	Referee: Owe Lüthcke

8 March 2010; 18:30 CET	Stavanger Oilers	5 – 0 (1–0, 3–0, 1–0)	Lillehammer	Siddishallen, Stavanger; Attendance: 1,350

Game reference

Antti Ore
Goalies
Alexander Bergh
Referee:
Lasse Westby

Strandfeldt (Loikas, Solberg) (PP) - 8:25	1 – 0
Sveum (Bina, Loikas) - 23:40	2 – 0
Suoraniemi (Loikas, Strandfeldt) - 31:06	3 – 0
Suoraniemi (Loikas) - 36:15	4 – 0
Suoraniemi (Grafsrønningen, Kaunismäki) - 48:27	5 – 0

18 min
Penalties
12 min
37
Shots
19

10 March 2010; 18:30 CET	Lillehammer	3 – 2 (OT) (0–0, 1–2, 1–0, 1–0)	Stavanger Oilers	Kristins Hall, Lillehammer; Attendance: 1,302

Game reference

Tommy Johansen
Goalies
Antti Ore
Referee:
Owe Lüthcke

Eidsæther (Hay, Pöllänen) (PP) - 23:52	1 – 0
	1 – 1	29:49 - Dahl Andersen (Bina, David)
	1 – 2	37:09 - Trygg (Sundin)
Sjödin (Abrahamsson) - 47:12	2 – 2
Saxrud (Olsen, Spets) - 61:37	3 – 2

30 min
Penalties
30 min
29
Shots
26

12 March 2010; 18:30 CET	Stavanger Oilers	6 – 0 (2–0, 2–0, 2–0)	Lillehammer	Siddishallen, Stavanger; Attendance: 2,157

Game reference

Antti Ore
Goalies
Tommy Johansen
Referee:
Tommy Søstumoen

Sundin (Bina) (PP) - 9:05	1 – 0
Nagel (Lorentzen, Bina) - 13:35	2 – 0
Strandfeldt (Loikas, Bina) - 23:57	3 – 0
Strandfeldt (Suoraniemi, Solberg) (PP2) - 32:03	4 – 0
Loikas (Strandfeldt, Lehtonen) - 54:35	5 – 0
Hallem (Grafsrønningen, Bina) - 56:08	6 – 0

12 min
Penalties
18 min
30
Shots
19

14 March 2010; 17:00 CET	Lillehammer	0 – 1 (0–1, 0–0, 0–0)	Stavanger Oilers	Kristins Hall, Lillehammer; Attendance: 1,436

Game reference
Tommy Johansen (out 20:00); Alexander Bergh (in 20:00)	Goalies	Antti Ore	Referee: Owe Lüthcke
0 – 1 / 7:51 - Borhaug (Lindahl, Trygg) 7:51			Referee: Owe Lüthcke
8 min	Penalties	12 min	Referee: Owe Lüthcke
24	Shots	18	Referee: Owe Lüthcke

Stavanger won series 4–2

(4) Lørenskog vs. (8) Storhamar Dragons

4 March 2010; 18:30 CET	Lørenskog	4 – 2 (0–1, 2–0, 2–1)	Storhamar Dragons	Lørenskog Ishall, Lørenskog; Attendance: 446

Game reference

Lars Haugen
Goalies
Ruben Smith
Referee:
Lasse Westby

	0 – 1	5:55 - Jensen (Johnsen)
Charpentier (Öberg) - 25:37	1 – 1
Macneil (Larsen, Stuart) (PP) - 33:57	2 – 1
Stokvik (Stuart, Thygesen) (PP) - 56:08	3 – 1
Stokvik (Olsen Lie) (EN) - 57:41	4 – 1
	4 – 2	59:34 - Livf (Mostue, Ramstedt)

12 min
Penalties
18 min
33
Shots
29

6 March 2010; 16:00 CET	Storhamar Dragons	4 – 1 (2–1, 1–0, 1–0)	Lørenskog	Hamar OL-Amfi, Hamar; Attendance: 1,204

Game reference

Ruben Smith
Goalies
Lars Haugen
Referee:
Tor Olav Johnsen

Hesbråten (Ramstedt, Grøndahl) - 7:15	1 – 0
Huse (Hillestad, Koivu) - 11:36	2 – 0
	2 – 1	15:00 - Macneil (Stokvik, Olsen Lie)
Jensen (Mostue, Johnsen) - 31:30	3 – 1
Grøndahl (Hesbråten, Ramstedt) (PP) - 47:26	4 – 1

8 min
Penalties
18 min
33
Shots
25

8 March 2010; 18:30 CET	Lørenskog	2 – 4 (1–0, 1–4, 0–0)	Storhamar Dragons	Lørenskog Ishall, Lørenskog; Attendance: 630

Game reference

Lars Haugen
Goalies
Ruben Smith
Referees:
Petter Hegle
Kjell Kristiansen

Stokvik (Öberg, Anderson) (PP2) - 6:38	1 – 0
	1 – 1	21:39 - Hjelm (Hesbråten, Ramstedt)
	1 – 2	31:02 - Johnsen (Jensen, Skadsdammen)
	1 – 3	33:22 - Grøndahl (Hesbråten, Ramstedt)
Öberg (Lindström, Kristiansen) - 33:22	2 – 3
	2 – 4	38:24 - Jensen (Skadsdammen, Johnsen) (PP)

14 min
Penalties
12 min
28
Shots
27

10 March 2010; 18:30 CET	Storhamar Dragons	4 – 3 (0–2, 3–0, 1–1)	Lørenskog	Hamar OL-Amfi, Hamar; Attendance: 1,749

Game reference

Ruben Smith
Goalies
Lars Haugen
Referee:
Tor Olav Johnsen

	0 – 1	4:29 - Stokvik (Kristiansen)
	0 – 2	6:42 - Hollstedt (Charpentier, Kristiansen)
Østli (Ramstedt, Grøndahl) - 23:21	1 – 2
Østli (Huse, Smith) - 35:22	2 – 2
Hesbråten (Ørbæk, Ramstedt) - 39:08	3 – 2
	3 – 3	45:47 - Öberg (Lindström)
Skadsdammen (Jensen, Johnsen) - 59:14	4 – 3

8 min
Penalties
6 min
29
Shots
33

12 March 2010; 18:30 CET	Lørenskog	2 – 4 (0–3, 1–1, 1–0)	Storhamar Dragons	Lørenskog Ishall, Lørenskog; Attendance: 675

Game reference

Robert Hestmann
Goalies
Ruben Smith
Referee:
Tor Olav Johnsen

	0 – 1	5:42 - Jensen (Mostue, Johnsen)
	0 – 2	12:02 - Grøndahl (Hesbråten, Hjelm)
	0 – 3	13:33 - Jensen (Skadsdammen, Johnsen)
Fjeldstad (Öberg, Thygesen) - 31:21	1 – 3
	1 – 4	35:04 - Grøndahl (Hesbråten, Hjelm) (PP)
Lindström (Kjell) - 49:34	2 – 4

10 min
Penalties
12 min
40
Shots
22

Storhamar won series 4–1

Semi-finals

(1) Vålerenga vs. (8) Storhamar Dragons

19 March 2010; 18:30 CET	Vålerenga	1 – 2 (0–0, 0–1, 1–1)	Storhamar Dragons	Jordal Amfi, Oslo; Attendance: 2,239

Game reference

Patrick DesRochers
Goalies
Ruben Smith
Referee:
Ole Stian Hansen

	0 – 1	2:28 - Mostue (Skadsdammen, Johnsen)
Fredriksen (Lund) (PP) - 3:19	1 – 1
	1 – 2	17:29 - Jensen (Livf, Johnsen)

2 min
Penalties
10 min
39
Shots
18

21 March 2010; 17:00 CET	Storhamar Dragons	0 – 1 (0–0, 0–1, 0–0)	Vålerenga	Hamar OL-Amfi, Hamar; Attendance: 3,484

Game reference
Ruben Smith	Goalies	Patrick DesRochers	Referee: Owe Lüthcke
0 – 1 / 33:10 - Roselli Olsen (Stephenson, Kelly)			Referee: Owe Lüthcke
6 min	Penalties	12 min	Referee: Owe Lüthcke
20	Shots	34	Referee: Owe Lüthcke

23 March 2010; 18:30 CET	Vålerenga	4 – 1 (0–1, 3–0, 1–0)	Storhamar Dragons	Jordal Amfi, Oslo; Attendance: 2,520

Game reference

Patrick DesRochers
Goalies
Ruben Smith
Referee:
Ole Stian Hansen

	0 – 1	5:08 - Johnsen (Paulsen, Livf) (PP)
Olsson (Fredriksen, Trygg) - 21:34	1 – 1
Stephenson (Werner, Fredriksen) - 29:58	2 – 1
K.H. Spets (Csiszar, Thoresen) - 31:22	3 – 1
Hesler (Espeland, Kelly) - 42:45	4 – 1

8 min
Penalties
30 min
31
Shots
26

25 March 2010; 18:30 CET	Storhamar Dragons	0 – 10 (0–5, 0–4, 0–1)	Vålerenga	Hamar OL-Amfi, Hamar; Attendance: 2,437

Game reference

Ruben Smith
Goalies
Patrick DesRochers
Referee:
Owe Lüthcke

0 – 1	2:00 - Thoresen (Werner)
0 – 2	10:10 - Thoresen (L.E. Spets, Sørvik)
0 – 3	11:53 - Evans (Nervik, Roselli Olsen)
0 – 4	12:29 - Fredriksen (Stephenson, Trygg)
0 – 5	15:50 - Espeland (Trygg, Evans) (PP)
0 – 6	22:41 - Stene (Espeland, Kelly)
0 – 7	28:09 - Thoresen (K.H. Spets, L.E. Spets)
0 – 8	29:19 - Roselli Olsen (Evans, Espeland)
0 – 9	37:14 - Evans
0 – 10	58:23 - K.H. Spets (Fredriksen, Stephenson) (PP)

26 min
Penalties
18 min
23
Shots
31

27 March 2010; 15:00 CET	Vålerenga	3 – 0 (1–0, 2–0, 0–0)	Storhamar Dragons	Jordal Amfi, Oslo; Attendance: 2,104

Game reference

Patrick DesRochers
Goalies
Ruben Smith
Referee:
Ole Stian Hansen

Lund (Thoresen, L.E. Spets) - 15:50	1 – 0
Evans (Nervik, Lund) - 24:22	2 – 0
L.E. Spets (K.H. Spets, Fredriksen) (PP) - 37:04	3 – 0

8 min
Penalties
30 min
32
Shots
11

Vålerenga won series 4–1

(2) Sparta Warriors vs. (3) Stavangers Oilers

19 March 2010; 18:30 CET	Sparta Warriors	1 – 3 (0–0, 1–0, 0–3)	Stavangers Oilers	Sparta Amfi, Sarpsborg; Attendance: 2,329

Game reference

Phil Osaer
Goalies
Antti Ore
Referee:
Tor Olav Johnsen

Henriksen - 1:52	1 – 0
	1 – 1	8:31 - Dahl Andersen (Bina, Trygg)
	1 – 2	12:16 - Dahl Andersen (Bina, Trygg) (PP)
	1 – 3	19:34 - Solberg (Lorentzen, Nagel) (EN)

10 min
Penalties
10 min
27
Shots
32

21 March 2010; 16:00 CET	Stavangers Oilers	4 – 3 (OT) (1–0, 1–1, 1–2, 1–0)	Sparta Warriors	Siddishallen, Stavanger; Attendance: 1,756

Game reference

Antti Ore
Goalies
Phil Osaer
Referee:
Eirik Hansen

Bina (Solberg, Dahl Andersen) (PP) - 6:46	1 – 0
	1 – 1	23:03 - Kristiansen (Witnes, Durco)
Strandfeldt (Suoraniemi, Bina) - 35:06	2 – 1
	2 – 2	46:23 - Lewerström (Roest, Bøe)
	2 – 3	50:40 - Løvlie (Bøe, Lundbohm)
Dahl Andersen (Lehtonen, David) - 54:09	3 – 3
Sundin (Trygg, Suoraniemi) - 62:40	4 – 3

14 min
Penalties
16 min
44
Shots
39

23 March 2010; 18:30 CET	Sparta Warriors	3 – 2 (2–1, 1–0, 0–1)	Stavangers Oilers	Sparta Amfi, Sarpsborg; Attendance: 2,201

Game reference

Phil Osaer
Goalies
Antti Ore
Referee:
Tor Olav Johnsen

	0 – 1	5:14 - Bina (Loikas) (PP)
Lundbohm (Elofsson, Larsson) (PP) - 8:05	1 – 1
Kristiansen (Witnes, Larsson) (PP) - 16:16	2 – 1
Larsson (Solberg Andersen) - 37:32	3 – 1
	3 – 2	46:17 - Dahl Andersen (Sundin, Solberg)

10 min
Penalties
14 min
18
Shots
30

25 March 2010; 18:30 CET	Stavangers Oilers	3 – 4 (OT) (1–0, 1–3, 1–0, 0–1)	Sparta Warriors	Siddishallen, Stavanger; Attendance: 1,705

Game reference

Antti Ore
Goalies
Phil Osaer
Referee:
Tor Olav Johnsen

Loikas (Sveum) - 1:51	1 – 0
	1 – 1	25:03 - Lundbohm (Solberg Andersen, Bøe)
Strandfeldt (Bina, Loikas) (PP) - 26:04	2 – 1
	2 – 2	27:02 - Elofsson (Larsson, Djupvik Løvlie)
	2 – 3	35:13 - Solberg Andersen
Hallem (Bina, Dahl Andersen) - 53:29	3 – 3
	3 – 4	64:15 - Kristiansen (Witnes, Larsson)

8 min
Penalties
16 min
41
Shots
38

27 March 2010; 15:00 CET	Sparta Warriors	2 – 3 (1–0, 0–3, 1–0)	Stavangers Oilers	Sparta Amfi, Sarpsborg; Attendance: 2,722

Game reference

Phil Osaer
Goalies
Antti Ore
Referee:
Tommy Søstumoen

Larsson (Djupvik Løvlie, Lewerström) - 0:50	1 – 0
	1 – 1	21:57 - Strandfeldt
	1 – 2	25:11 - Strandfeldt (Loikas, Solberg) (PP)
	1 – 3	34:27 - Strandfeldt (Sveum, Bina) (PP)
Solberg Andersen (Djupvik Løvlie, Elofsson) - 52:56	2 – 3

26 min
Penalties
28 min
17
Shots
26

29 March 2010; 18:30 CET	Stavangers Oilers	3 – 2 (0–1, 2–1, 1–0)	Sparta Warriors	Siddishallen, Stavanger; Attendance: 2,260

Game reference

Antti Ore
Goalies
Phil Osaer
Referee:
Tor Olav Johnsen

	0 – 1	8:10 - Witnes (Lundbohm, Bøe)
Nagel (Dahl Andersen, Lehtonen) - 29:03	1 – 1
Suoraniemi (Bina, Ore) (PP) - 32:25	2 – 1
	2 – 2	33:04 - Durco
Strandfeldt (Loikas, Bina) (PP2) - 47:09	3 – 2

6 min
Penalties
14 min
33
Shots
28

Stavanger won series 4–2

Finals

(1) Vålerenga vs. (3) Stavanger Oilers

7 April 2010; 18:30 CET	Vålerenga	5 – 4 (OT) (1–1, 1–1, 2–2, 1–0)	Stavanger Oilers	Jordal Amfi, Oslo; Attendance: 2,330

Game reference

Patrick DesRochers
Goalies
Antti Ore
Referee:
Ole Stian Hansen

Espeland (Oppøyen, Stene) - 2:53	1 – 0
	1 – 1	9:32 - Dahl Andersen (Strandfeldt, Solberg)
Olsson (L.E. Spets, K.H. Spets) - 29:26	2 – 1
	2 – 2	39:13 - Dahl Andersen (Marius Trygg, Sundin) (PP)
Stephenson (Fredriksen, Mathias Trygg) - 47:11	3 – 2
	3 – 3	50:38 - Suoraniemi (Sveum) (PP)
	3 – 4	55:08 - Strandfeldt (Loikas, Kaunismäki) (PP)
Werner (Mathias Trygg, Espeland) (PP) - 57:31	4 – 4
Mathias Trygg (Espeland, Thoresen) (PP) - 66:28	5 – 4

16 min
Penalties
32 min
22
Shots
28

10 April 2010; 15:00 CET	Stavanger Oilers	4 – 3 (1–0, 3–2, 0–1)	Vålerenga	Siddishallen, Stavanger; Attendance: 2,010

Game reference

Antti Ore
Goalies
Patrick DesRochers
Referee:
Owe Lüthcke

Dahl Andersen (Sundin, Grafsrønningen) - 13:31	1 – 0
Lorentzen (Nagel, Strandfeldt) - 22:07	2 – 0
	2 – 1	23:22 - Werner (Thoresen, Evans) (PP)
Bina (Trygg, Sveum) (PP) - 27:17	3 – 1
Trygg (Sveum, Dahl Andersen) (PP) - 31:18	4 – 1
	4 – 2	31:41 - L.E. Spets (Thoresen, K.H. Spets)
	4 – 3	42:04 - L.E. Spets (Espeland) (PP)

42 min
Penalties
34 min
19
Shots
28

11 April 2010; 15:00 CET	Vålerenga	5 – 0 (1–0, 2–0, 2–0)	Stavanger Oilers	Jordal Amfi, Oslo; Attendance: 2,416

Game reference

Patrick DesRochers
Goalies
Antti Ore (out 43:26)
Lars Volden (in 43:26)
Referee:
Tor Olav Johnsen

Nervik (Sørvik, Fredriksen) - 7:43	1 – 0
Oppøyen (Lund) - 27:09	2 – 0
Stephenson (Fredriksen, Trygg) - 28:59	3 – 0
Lund (K.H. Spets, Fredriksen) (PP) - 40:37	4 – 0
Roselli Olsen (Thoresen, Sørvik) - 43:26	5 – 0

6 min
Penalties
14 min
34
Shots
17

13 April 2010; 18:30 CET	Stavanger Oilers	2 – 1 (2OT) (0–0, 1–1, 0–0, 0–0, 1–0)	Vålerenga	Siddishallen, Stavanger; Attendance: 1,910

Game reference

Antti Ore
Goalies
Patrick DesRochers
Referee:
Ole Stian Hansen

	0 – 1	40:53 - Fredriksen (Olsson, Stephenson)
Suoraniemi (Bina, Strandfeldt) - 48:05	1 – 1
Hallem (Sundin, Dahl Andersen) - 84:38	2 – 1

54 min
Penalties
66 min
35
Shots
33

16 April 2010; 18:30 CET	Vålerenga	2 – 3 (OT) (1–0, 0–0, 1–2, 0–1)	Stavanger Oilers	Jordal Amfi, Oslo; Attendance: 2,507

Game reference

Patrick DesRochers
Goalies
Antti Ore
Referee:
Tor Olav Johnsen

K.H. Spets (Sørvik, Trygg) - 12:55	1 – 0
Stephenson - 47:20	2 – 0
	2 – 1	55:45 - Loikas (Strandfeldt, Lehtonen)
	2 – 2	59:37 - Dahl Andersen (Nagel, Strandfeldt)
	2 – 3	66:27 - Strandfeldt

10 min
Penalties
12 min
37
Shots
38

19 April 2010; 18:30 CET	Stavanger Oilers	4 – 0 (2–0, 1–0, 1–0)	Vålerenga	Siddishallen, Stavanger; Attendance: 2,664

Game reference

Antti Ore
Goalies
Patrick DesRochers
Referee:
Tor Olav Johnsen

Hallem (Lehtonen) - 9:17	1 – 0
Sundin - 10:21	2 – 0
Strandfeldt (Suoraniemi, Loikas) - 21:13	3 – 0
Dahl Andersen (Sundin) (EN) - 57:41	4 – 0

12 min
Penalties
12 min
29
Shots
26

Stavanger won series 4–2

=== Statistics ===
==== Scoring leaders ====
These are the top ten skaters in the playoffs based on points. If the list exceeds ten skaters because of a tie in points, all of the tied skaters are shown.

Player	Team	GP	G	A	Pts	+/–	PIM
(Sweden) Martin Strandfeldt	Stavanger Oilers	18	13	8	21	+7	24
(United States) Robert Bina	Stavanger Oilers	18	4	16	20	+6	4
(Norway) Anders Fredriksen	Vålerenga	16	6	11	17	+10	4
(Finland) Juha-Pekka Loikas	Stavanger Oilers	18	3	14	17	+5	22
(Norway) Christian Dahl Andersen	Stavanger Oilers	18	10	5	15	+5	2
(Norway) Jonas Solberg Andersen	Sparta Warriors	12	7	8	15	+3	8
(Norway) Knut Henrik Spets	Vålerenga	13	4	11	15	+6	37
(Sweden) Alexander Larsson	Sparta Warriors	12	4	11	15	0	8
(Norway) Lars Erik Spets	Vålerenga	15	7	6	13	+4	16
(Norway) Lars Erik Lund	Vålerenga	16	5	8	13	+8	6

GP = Games played; G = Goals; A = Assists; Pts = Points; +/– = Plus–minus; PIM = Penalty minutes

==== Leading goaltenders ====
These are the top five goaltenders in the playoffs based on goals against average.

Player	Team	GP	TOI	W	L	GA	SO	Sv%	GAA
(Canada) Patrick DesRochers	Vålerenga	16	992	10	6	32	4	91.9	1.93
(Finland) Antti Ore	Stavanger Oilers	18	1,107	12	6	39	4	91.9	2.11
(United States) Phil Osaer	Sparta Warriors	12	724	6	6	27	0	93.1	2.23
(Sweden) Alexander Bergh	Lillehammer	4	217	1	2	10	1	90.0	2.76
(Norway) Pål Grotnes	Stjernen	6	356	2	4	17	0	91.2	2.86

GP = Games played; TOI = Time on ice (minutes); W = Wins; L = Losses; GA = Goals against; SO = Shutouts; Sv% = Save percentage; GAA = Goals against average

== Qualifying for GET-ligaen 2010–11 ==
=== Final standings ===
	Team	GP	W	OTW	SOW	OTL	SOL	L	Pts	PCT	GF	GA	PIM	Home	Away
1	Frisk Tigers (Q)	6	5	0	1	0	0	0	17	94	43	11	60	2-1-0-0	3-0-0-0
2	Rosenborg (Q)	6	4	0	0	0	1	1	13	72	28	10	108	2-0-0-1	2-0-0-0
3	Grüner	6	2	0	0	0	0	4	6	33	16	33	50	1-0-0-2	1-0-0-2
4	Kongsvinger Knights	6	0	0	0	0	0	6	0	0	8	41	52	0-0-0-3	0-0-0-3

GP = Games played; W = Wins; L = Losses; OTW = Overtime Wins; OTL = Overtime losses; SOW = Shootout Wins; SOL = Shootout losses; PCT = Percentage of possible points; GF = Goals for; GA = Goals against; PIM = Penalties in minutes; Pts = Points; Q = Qualified
Source: hockey.no

=== Game log ===
Qualifying for GET-ligaen 2010–11 Game Log
Rounds 1–6

Round 1

4 March 2010; 18:30 CET	Frisk Tigers	8 – 2 (3–1, 1–1, 4–0)	Kongsvinger Knights	Askerhallen, Asker

Game reference
2 min	Penalties	6 min
38	Shots	14

4 March 2010; 18:30 CET	Rosenborg	5 – 3 (2–0, 0–0, 3–3)	Grüner	Leangen Ishall, Trondheim; Attendance: 1,236

Game reference
14 min	Penalties	12 min
30	Shots	31

Round 2

7 March 2010; 17:00 CET	Grüner	5 – 12 (1–3, 2–5, 2–4)	Frisk Tigers	Grünerhallen, Oslo

Game reference
10 min	Penalties	4 min
30	Shots	61

7 March 2010; 17:00 CET	Kongsvinger Knights	1 – 5 (0–1, 1–4, 0–0)	Rosenborg	Kongshallen, Kongsvinger

Game reference
10 min	Penalties	18 min
26	Shots	31

Round 3

11 March 2010; 18:30 CET	Rosenborg	2 – 3 (0–1, 1–1, 1–1)	Frisk Tigers	Leangen Ishall, Trondheim; Attendance: 1,870

Game reference
6 min	Penalties	8 min
25	Shots	26

11 March 2010; 18:30 CET	Kongsvinger Knights	1 – 4 (1–1, 0–2, 0–1)	Grüner	Kongshallen, Kongsvinger

Game reference
8 min	Penalties	10 min
26	Shots	32

Round 4

14 March 2010; 17:00 CET	Kongsvinger Knights	1 – 9 (0–4, 0–3, 1–2)	Frisk Tigers	Kongshallen, Kongsvinger

Game reference
12 min	Penalties	6 min
21	Shots	45

14 March 2010; 17:00 CET	Grüner	0 – 4 (0–2, 0–1, 0–1)	Rosenborg	Grünerhallen, Oslo; Attendance: 220

Game reference
4 min	Penalties	6 min
32	Shots	41

Round 5

18 March 2010; 18:30 CET	Frisk Tigers	9 – 0 (5–0, 1–0, 3–0)	Grüner	Askerhallen, Asker

Game reference
4 min	Penalties	0 min
42	Shots	18

18 March 2010; 18:30 CET	Rosenborg	11 – 1 (3–0, 5–0, 3–1)	Kongsvinger Knights	Leangen Ishall, Trondheim

Game reference
10 min	Penalties	6 min
48	Shots	25

Round 6

23 March 2010; 17:00 CET	Frisk Tigers	2 – 1 (SO) (0–1, 0–0, 1–0, 0–0, 2/3–1/3)	Rosenborg	Askerhallen, Asker

Game reference
36 min	Penalties	54 min
36	Shots	14

23 March 2010; 17:00 CET	Grüner	4 – 2 (0–1, 2–1, 2–0)	Kongsvinger Knights	Grünerhallen, Oslo

Game reference
14 min	Penalties	10 min
30	Shots	30

== Awards ==
All-Star team

The following players were selected to the 2009–10 GET-ligaen All-Star team:

- Goaltender: Patrick DesRochers (Vålerenga)
- Defenseman: Robert Bina (Stavanger)
- Defenseman: Regan Kelly (Vålerenga)
- Center: Anders Fredriksen (Vålerenga)
- Winger: Tomi Pöllänen (Lillehammer)
- Winger: Knut Henrik Spets (Vålerenga)

Other

- Player of the year: Tomi Pöllänen (Lillehammer)
- Coach of the year: David Livingston (Manglerud Star)
- Playoff MVP: Robert Bina (Stavanger)
