= 2009–10 Storhamar Dragons season =

Norwegian ice hockey club season

Storhamar Dragons played in the GET-ligaen for the 2009–10 season. They finished fifth in the league and reached the semi-finals.

== Roster ==
This is the Storhamar Dragons roster of the 2009/2010 season.

Goaltenders
Number		Player	Catches	Born	Place of Birth
31	(Sweden)	Daniel Wälitalo	R	15.07.88	Umeå, Sweden
30	(Norway)	Ruben Smith	L	15.04.87	Stavanger, Norway

Defensemen
Number		Player	Shoots	Born	Place of Birth
2	(Norway)	Teddy Midttun	L	16.05.84	Hamar, Norway
5	(Norway)	Mattias Livf - C	L	24.02.74	Sweden
7	(Finland)	Eerikki Koivu	L	29.12.79	Kokkola, Finland
12	(Norway)	Mats Mostue	R	25.01.89	Hamar, Norway
22	(Sweden)	Andreas Hjelm	L	03.03.88	Stockholm, Sweden
37	(Norway)	Lars Løkken Østli	R	22.11.86	Hamar, Norway
53	(Norway)	Andreas Paulsen Aas	L	03.01.92	Hamar, Norway
54	(Norway)	Mikkel Stensrud	R	08.06.89	Hamar, Norway
58	(Norway)	Martin Lindstad	R	07.11.91	Hamar, Norway
83	(Norway)	Cato Ørbæk	L	23.02.83	Hamar, Norway

Forwards
Number		Player	Shoots	Position	Born	Place of Birth
8	(Norway)	Eirik Skadsdammen	L	FW	23.05.81	Kongsvinger, Norway
11	(Sweden)	Johan Ramstedt	L	FW	04.06.78	Skellefteå, Sweden
16	(Norway)	Lars Erik Hesbråthen	L	FW	01.07.85	Kongsvinger, Norway
18	(Norway)	Pål Johnsen - A	L	C	17.03.76	Hamar, Norway
21	(Norway)	Joakim Jensen	L	FW	08.08.87	Bærum, Norway
33	(Norway)	Marius Mathisrud	R	FW	27.04.87	Oslo, Norway
36	(Norway)	Martin Blakseth Huse	L	FW	12.06.89	Hamar, Norway
44	(Norway)	Simen Hoel Johannessen	L	RW	20.02.90	Gjøvik, Norway
51	(Norway)	Andre Bjørge Paulsen	L	F	14.02.83	Hamar, Norway
52	(Norway)	Ørjan Mikkelsen	R	FW	20.12.87	Hamar, Norway
55	(Norway)	Remo Nicolaisen	R	FW	02.10.92	Trondheim, Norway
56	(Sweden)	Andreas Gröndahl	L	FW	20.12.87	Södertälje, Sweden
59	(Norway)	Fredrik Arnesen	L	FW	15.08.86	Hamar, Norway
62	(Norway)	Trygve Hillestad	R	C/FW	11.10.85	Gjøvik, Norway
91	(Norway)	Eirik Børresen	R	FW	07.08.91	Hamar, Norway
