= Marco Charpentier =

Canadian professional ice hockey forward

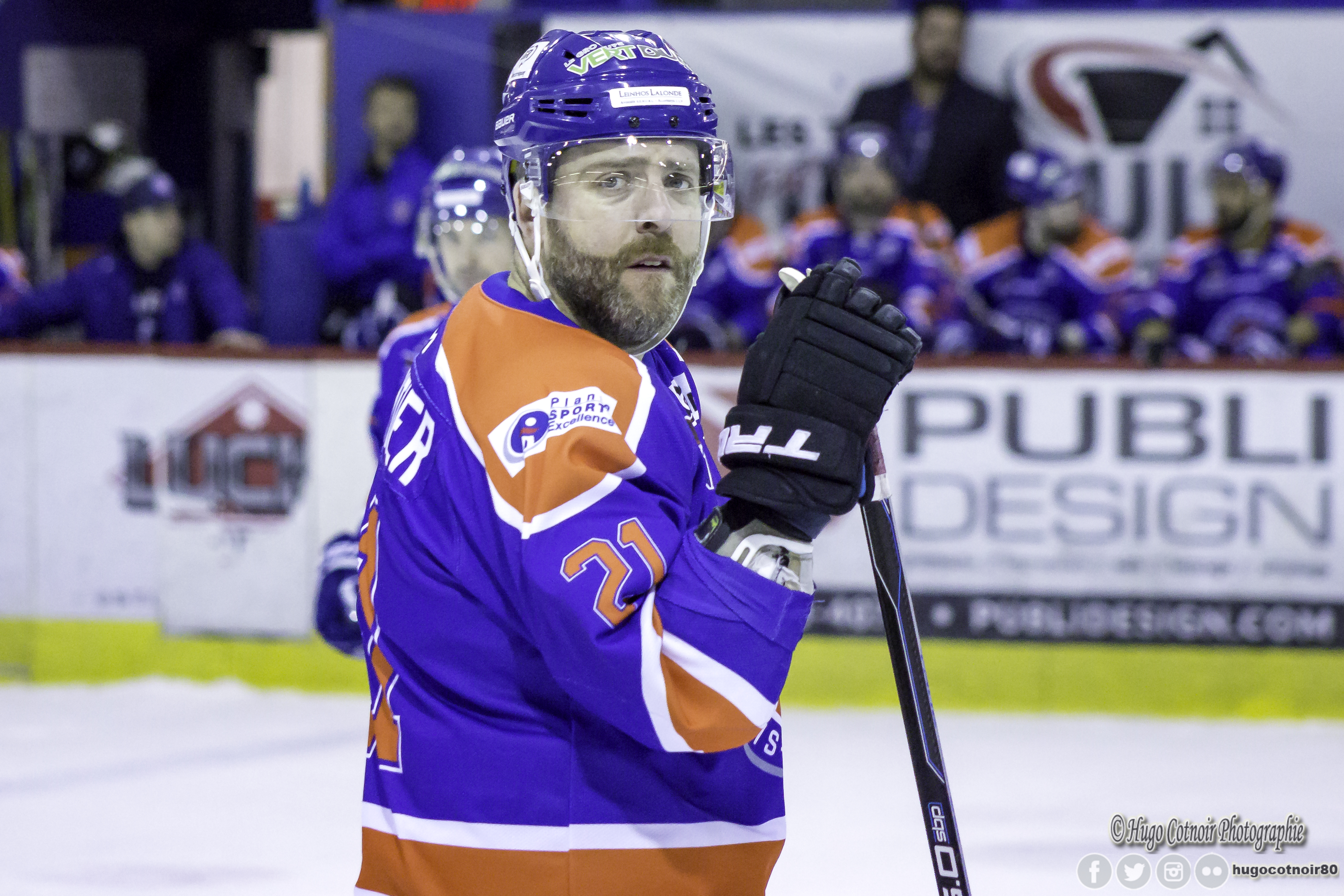
- image of Marco Charpentier, was a Canadian professional ice hockey player
- Born: January 23, 1980 (age 45) Montreal, Quebec, Canada
- Height: 6 ft 0 in (183 cm)
- Weight: 212 lb (96 kg; 15 st 2 lb)
- Position: Forward
- Shoots: Left
- LNAH team Former teams: Sorel-Tracy Éperviers; Bridgeport Sound Tigers; SC Langenthal; EHC Visp; Lausanne HC; Lørenskog IK; HC La Chaux-de-Fonds; HC Thurgau; Martigny Red Ice
- NHL draft: Undrafted
- Playing career: 2001–present

Marco Charpentier (born January 23, 1980) is a Canadian professional ice hockey forward, whose semi-professional rights are owned by Sorel-Tracy Éperviers in the LNAH.

== Playing career ==
On 28 August 2009, Charpentier joined the Norwegian GET-ligaen team Lørenskog on a 2-week try-out. He made a good impression and was offered a contract. Despite ending the 2009–10-season as the third best scoring leader, behind Tomi Pöllänen and Jonas Solberg Andersen, he was not offered a new contract. General Manager, Kjell Erik Oseberg, stated that his defensive qualities were not the best (64 points and only a +9 rating).

On 17 April 2010, he was hired by the Swiss National League B team La Chaux-de-Fonds, with an option.
