= Spets (surname) =

Spets is a surname. Notable people with the surname include:

- Knut Henrik Spets (born 1982), Norwegian ice hockey player
- Lars Erik Spets (born 1985), Norwegian ice hockey player
- Rikard Spets (born 1971), Norwegian writer
- Ann-Katrin (Anki) Spets (born 1958), Swedish designer
