= Jonas Andersen =

Jonas Andersen may refer to:

- Jonas Solberg Andersen (born 1981), Norwegian ice hockey player
- Jonas Andersen (speedway rider) (born 1992), Danish speedway rider
