= Pöllänen =

Pöllänen is a Finnish surname. Notable people with the surname include:

- Herkko Pöllänen (born 1994), Finnish tennis player
- Krista Pöllänen (born 1981), Finnish ten-pin bowler
- Tomi Pöllänen (born 1978), Finnish ice hockey player
