= GET-ligaen Playoff MVP =

Norwegian ice hockey award

GET-ligaen Playoff MVP is a Norwegian ice hockey award which is awarded annually to the player judged most valuable to his team during the GET-ligaen playoffs. It was first awarded in 2007.

The trophy itself is much larger than Kongepokalen, which is the prize the Norwegian ice hockey clubs compete for each year in order to become Norwegian ice hockey champions.

The 2015 edition was won by Storhamar's Christian Larrivée.

== Winners ==
Positions key
C	Centre	F	Forward
D	Defence	G	Goaltender

Season	Most Valuable Player	Team	Pos
2006/07	Christian Larrivée	Storhamar Dragons	C
2007/08	Ruben Smith	Storhamar Dragons	G
2008/09	Lars Erik Spets	Vålerenga	F
2009/10	Robert Bina	Stavanger Oilers	D
2010/11	Henrik Malmström	Sparta Warriors	F
2011/12	Lars Peder Nagel	Stavanger Oilers	F
2012/13	Henrik Holm	Stavanger Oilers	G
2013/14	Nick Schaus	Stavanger Oilers	D
2014/15	Christian Larrivée	Storhamar Hockey	C
2015/16	Ruben Smith	Stavanger Oilers	G
