= Alexander Larsson =

Swedish ice hockey player

- Born: 7 September 1985 (age 40) Grästorp, Sweden
- Height: 6 ft 0 in (183 cm)
- Weight: 198 lb (90 kg; 14 st 2 lb)
- Position: Centre
- Shoots: Left
- GET team Former teams: Lørenskog; SHL; HV71; Timrå; Brynäs; HockeyAllsvenskan; Sundsvall; Södertälje; Vita Hästen; GET; Frisk Tigers; Sparta Warriors
- Playing career: 2003–present

Alexander Larsson (born 7 September 1985) was a Swedish professional ice hockey centre who played for Lørenskog of the Norwegian GET-ligaen. He started playing for HV71 in the 2001-2002 season.

== Career statistics ==
			Regular season					Playoffs
Season	Team	League	GP	G	A	Pts	PIM	GP	G	A	Pts	PIM
2001–02	HV71 J18	J18 Allsvenskan	9	3	2	5	4	—	—	—	—	—
2002–03	HV71 J18	J18 Allsvenskan	6	2	1	3	14	1	0	1	1	2
2002–03	HV71 J20	J20 SuperElit	28	5	5	10	8	7	0	1	1	2
2003–04	HV71 J20	J20 SuperElit	35	11	17	28	53	2	0	0	0	2
2003–04	HV71	Elitserien	3	0	0	0	0	—	—	—	—	—
2004–05	HV71 J20	J20 SuperElit	32	9	26	35	18	—	—	—	—	—
2004–05	HV71	Elitserien	6	0	0	0	6	—	—	—	—	—
2005–06	IF Sundsvall Hockey	HockeyAllsvenskan	38	5	17	22	30	—	—	—	—	—
2006–07	IF Sundsvall Hockey	HockeyAllsvenskan	38	5	18	23	87	—	—	—	—	—
2006–07	Timrå IK	Elitserien	4	0	0	0	0	—	—	—	—	—
2007–08	IF Sundsvall Hockey	HockeyAllsvenskan	41	8	10	18	32	—	—	—	—	—
2008–09	Frisk Asker Ishockey	Norway	43	22	28	50	73	—	—	—	—	—
2009–10	Sparta Sarpsborg	Norway	48	22	38	60	24	12	4	11	15	8
2010–11	Timrå IK	Elitserien	49	4	3	7	16	—	—	—	—	—
2010–11	IF Sundsvall Hockey	HockeyAllsvenskan	3	0	5	5	0	—	—	—	—	—
2011–12	Timrå IK	Elitserien	45	7	13	20	16	—	—	—	—	—
2012–13	Timrå IK	Elitserien	33	4	8	12	18	—	—	—	—	—
2013–14	Brynäs IF	SHL	20	2	3	5	4	—	—	—	—	—
2014–15	Södertälje SK	HockeyAllsvenskan	22	2	8	10	14	—	—	—	—	—
2014–15	HC Vita Hästen	HockeyAllsvenskan	22	5	12	17	2	8	1	2	3	4
2015–16	Lørenskog IK	Norway	36	9	16	25	54	16	4	5	9	43
2016–17	Lørenskog IK	Norway	44	18	24	42	54	7	0	3	3	8
2017–18	Lørenskog IK	Norway	—	—	—	—	—	—	—	—	—	—
SHL (Elitserien) totals			160	17	27	44	60	—	—	—	—	—
HockeyAllsvenskan totals			164	25	70	95	165	8	1	2	3	4
Norway totals			171	71	106	177	205	35	8	19	27	59
