= Anders Fredriksen =

Norwegian ice hockey player

- Born: 17 February 1981 (age 44); Fredrikstad, Norway
- Height: 5 ft 10 in (178 cm)
- Weight: 180 lb (82 kg; 12 st 12 lb)
- Position: Center
- Shot: Left
- Played for: Frölunda; Tingsryd; Skellefteå; Vålerenga; Lørenskog
- National team: Norway
- Playing career: 2000–2011

Anders Fredriksen (born 17 February 1981) is a Norwegian former professional ice hockey player, who played several seasons for Vålerenga in GET-ligaen.

== Playing career ==
=== Early career ===
He moved to Sweden as a 17-year-old, and started playing for Frölunda in the Swedish junior league, J20 Superelit. After having 42 points in 39 matches during the 1999–2000 season, he signed with Tingsryd in HockeyAllsvenskan.

=== Skellefteå ===
On 15 May 2001, it was announced that Fredriksen would leave Tingsryd for the ambitious Northern Swedish team Skellefteå, along with Daniel Ström and Pasi Mustonen.

=== Vålerenga ===
Before the 2003–04 GET-ligaen season, Fredriksen decided to move back to Norway and play for Vålerenga Ishockey. After having three straight 40+ points seasons, he had 58 points in 45 matches in the 2009–10 GET-ligaen season, and finished sixth in the point statistics. In his last season as an active player, he played for Lørenskog.

== International play ==
Fredriksen played for the Norwegian national team during the 2000 and 2001 IIHF World Championship. After 9 years absence, he was again selected for the 2010 and 2011 Championships. He has also played on the Norwegian national junior team.
