= Darrell Hay =

Canadian ice hockey player (born 1980)

- Born: April 2, 1980 (age 46) Kamloops, British Columbia, Canada
- Height: 6 ft 0 in (183 cm)
- Weight: 201 lb (91 kg; 14 st 5 lb)
- Position: Defence
- Shot: Right
- Played for: Kansas City Blades; Manitoba Moose; Utah Grizzlies; Idaho Steelheads; Grand Rapids Griffins; Lillehammer IK; BK Mladá Boleslav; HC Bílí Tygři Liberec; SG Cortina; Sheffield Steelers
- NHL draft: 271st overall, 1999; Vancouver Canucks
- Playing career: 2000–2016

Darrell Hay (born April 2, 1980) is a Canadian former professional ice hockey defenceman. He was selected by the Vancouver Canucks in the ninth round (271st overall) of the 1999 NHL entry draft. Darrell is the son of Don Hay, who is the former coach of the Vancouver Giants and current Kamloops Blazers Head Coach of the WHL.

Hay played with BK Mladá Boleslav in the Czech Extraliga during the 2010–11 Czech Extraliga season.

== Career statistics ==
| | | | Regular season | | | | | Playoffs |
| Season | Team | League | GP | G | A | Pts | PIM | GP | G | A | Pts | PIM |
|---|---|---|---|---|---|---|---|---|---|---|---|---|
| 1996–97 | Tri-City Americans | WHL | 61 | 0 | 10 | 10 | 41 | — | — | — | — | — |
| 1997–98 | Tri-City Americans | WHL | 71 | 5 | 33 | 38 | 90 | — | — | — | — | — |
| 1998–99 | Tri-City Americans | WHL | 72 | 13 | 49 | 62 | 87 | 12 | 2 | 10 | 12 | 22 |
| 1999–00 | Tri-City Americans | WHL | 64 | 15 | 36 | 51 | 85 | 4 | 0 | 1 | 1 | 8 |
| 2000–01 | Florida Everblades | ECHL | 40 | 5 | 4 | 9 | 26 | 5 | 2 | 1 | 3 | 0 |
| 2000–01 | Kansas City Blades | IHL | 9 | 0 | 0 | 0 | 19 | — | — | — | — | — |
| 2001–02 | Manitoba Moose | AHL | 53 | 5 | 8 | 13 | 29 | 7 | 1 | 1 | 2 | 2 |
| 2001–02 | Columbia Inferno | ECHL | 15 | 0 | 13 | 13 | 15 | — | — | — | — | — |
| 2002–03 | Manitoba Moose | AHL | 43 | 3 | 10 | 13 | 29 | — | — | — | — | — |
| 2002–03 | Columbia Inferno | ECHL | 12 | 2 | 3 | 5 | 13 | 17 | 2 | 9 | 11 | 23 |
| 2003–04 | Idaho Steelheads | ECHL | 61 | 11 | 26 | 37 | 32 | 18 | 2 | 11 | 13 | 6 |
| 2003–04 | Utah Grizzlies | AHL | 10 | 1 | 1 | 2 | 12 | — | — | — | — | — |
| 2004–05 | Idaho Steelheads | ECHL | 72 | 7 | 29 | 36 | 26 | 4 | 1 | 3 | 4 | 4 |
| 2005–06 | SERC Wild Wings | Germany2 | 52 | 6 | 38 | 44 | 40 | 11 | 2 | 6 | 8 | 14 |
| 2006–07 | Idaho Steelheads | ECHL | 65 | 9 | 32 | 41 | 47 | 16 | 0 | 9 | 9 | 12 |
| 2007–08 | Idaho Steelheads | ECHL | 66 | 9 | 36 | 45 | 55 | 4 | 0 | 1 | 1 | 0 |
| 2007–08 | Grand Rapids Griffins | AHL | 4 | 0 | 1 | 1 | 2 | — | — | — | — | — |
| 2008–09 | Idaho Steelheads | ECHL | 56 | 7 | 31 | 38 | 25 | 4 | 1 | 1 | 2 | 2 |
| 2009–10 | Lillehammer IK | Norway | 48 | 6 | 27 | 33 | 42 | 6 | 1 | 2 | 3 | 8 |
| 2010–11 | BK Mlada Boleslav | Czech | 52 | 5 | 10 | 15 | 69 | — | — | — | — | — |
| 2011–12 | Bili Tygri Liberec | Czech | 20 | 1 | 0 | 1 | 8 | — | — | — | — | — |
| 2011–12 | BK Mlada Boleslav | Czech | 32 | 1 | 7 | 8 | 12 | — | — | — | — | — |
| 2012–13 | SG Cortina | Italy | 40 | 4 | 16 | 20 | 18 | 12 | 0 | 4 | 4 | 6 |
| 2013–14 | Tohoku Free Blades | Asia | 42 | 11 | 19 | 30 | 46 | — | — | — | — | — |
| 2014–15 | Sheffield Steelers | EIHL | 52 | 3 | 16 | 19 | 30 | 4 | 1 | 1 | 2 | 0 |
| 2015–16 | Sheffield Steelers | EIHL | 13 | 0 | 0 | 0 | 2 | — | — | — | — | — |
| 2018–19 | Sun Valley Suns | BDHL | 69 | 14 | 37 | 51 | 34 | 5 | 1 | 2 | 3 | 0 |
| AHL totals | | | 110 | 9 | 20 | 29 | 72 | 7 | 1 | 1 | 2 | 2 |
| ECHL totals | | | 387 | 50 | 174 | 224 | 239 | 68 | 8 | 35 | 43 | 47 |
