= Lars Erik Lund =

Norwegian ice hockey player (born 1974)

- Born: 25 July 1974 (age 51) Oslo, NOR
- Height: 6 ft 2 in (188 cm)
- Weight: 209 lb (95 kg; 14 st 13 lb)
- Position: Defence
- Shot: Left
- GET team Former teams: Vålerenga; Frisk Tigers; Vålerenga
- National team: Norway
- Playing career: 1996–2011

Lars Erik Lund (born 25 July 1974) is a Norwegian professional ice hockey player, who last played for Vålerenga in GET-ligaen.

== Club career ==
Lund has played for Vålerenga almost his whole career. The only exception was from 1999–2001, when he played two seasons for Frisk Tigers.

== International career ==
Lund has played for the Norway national ice hockey team since 2004. He has also played in national youth teams from the age of 18.

18 April 2008, he got a puck in his face during a match against Switzerland. After 10 hours in the operating room, they managed to save his eye, but his injuries were so severe that he missed the 2008 IIHF World Championship in Canada.

== Career statistics ==
=== Regular season and playoffs ===
			Regular season					Playoffs
Season	Team	League	GP	G	A	Pts	PIM	GP	G	A	Pts	PIM
1996–97	Vålerenga Ishockey	NOR	40	9	12	21	8	—	—	—	—	—
1997–98	Vålerenga Ishockey	NOR	34	8	10	18	39	—	—	—	—	—
1998–99	Vålerenga Ishockey	NOR	17	1	11	12	4	—	—	—	—	—
1999–2000	Frisk Asker	NOR	37	9	16	25	16	—	—	—	—	—
2000–01	Frisk Asker	NOR	41	17	21	38	12	—	—	—	—	—
2001–02	Vålerenga Ishockey	NOR	42	20	29	49	16	4	0	1	1	2
2002–03	Vålerenga Ishockey	NOR	37	7	26	33	24	—	—	—	—	—
2003–04	Vålerenga Ishockey	NOR	40	8	23	31	63	15	1	2	3	18
2004–05	Vålerenga Ishockey	NOR	41	4	18	22	32	11	5	3	8	2
2005–06	Vålerenga Ishockey	NOR	42	7	18	25	64	15	4	4	8	14
2006–07	Vålerenga Ishockey	NOR	41	20	37	57	44	15	5	7	12	6
2007–08	Vålerenga Ishockey	NOR	42	13	26	39	66	13	8	6	14	2
2008–09	Vålerenga Ishockey	NOR	42	13	27	40	16	17	3	9	12	4
2009–10	Vålerenga Ishockey	NOR	41	12	19	31	18	16	5	8	13	6
2010–11	Vålerenga Ishockey	NOR	42	10	16	26	16	5	2	3	5	2
NOR totals			579	158	309	467	438	111	33	43	76	56

=== International ===
Year	Team	Event	GP	G	A	Pts	PIM
1992	Norway	EJC	5	1	1	2	10
1993	Norway	WJC B	7	2	2	4	2
1994	Norway	WJC B	7	4	3	7	26
2004	Norway	WC D1	3	0	0	0	0
2006	Norway	WC	6	0	0	0	2
2007	Norway	WC	6	1	4	5	4
2009	Norway	OGQ	3	0	0	0	0
2009	Norway	WC	6	1	1	2	0
2010	Norway	OG	4	0	0	0	0
Junior totals			19	7	6	13	38
Senior totals			28	2	5	7	6
