= Henrik Solberg =

Norwegian ice hockey player

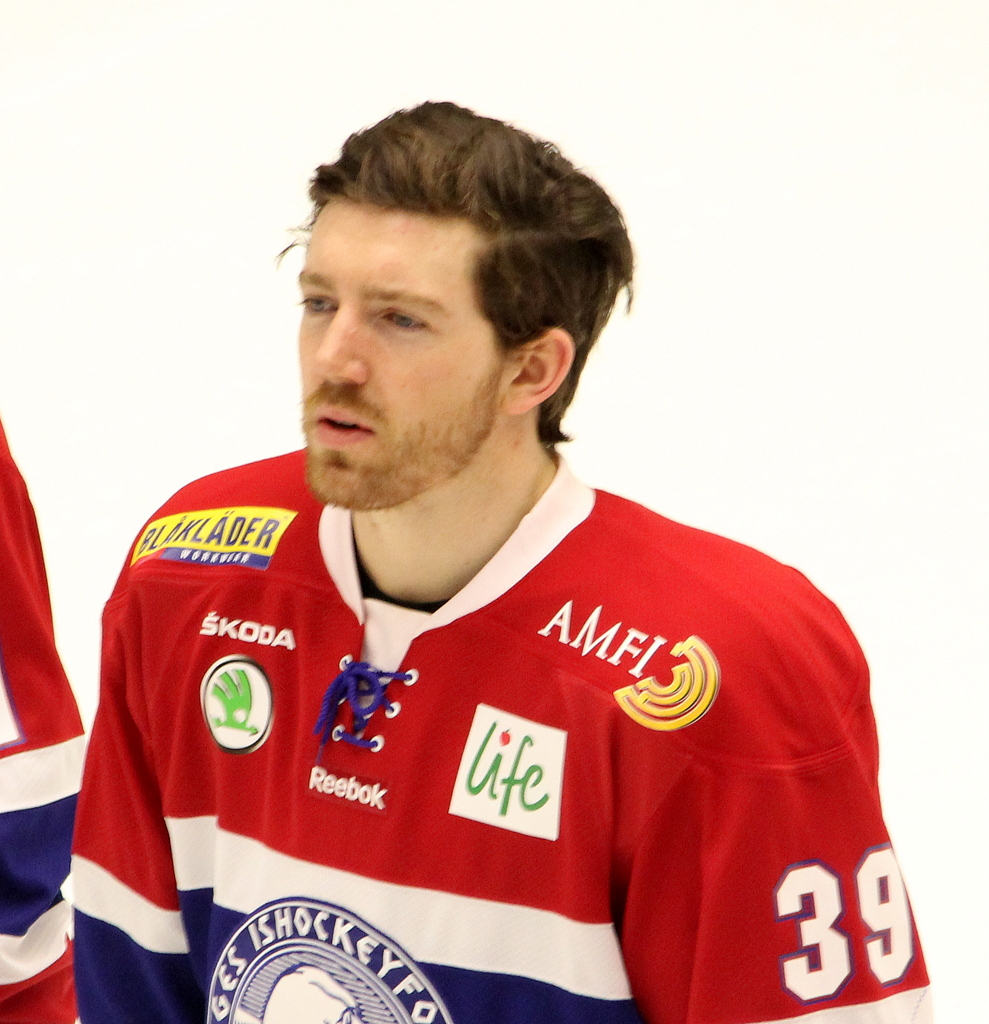
- Jarle Vines
- Born: April 15, 1987 (age 39) Trondheim, Norway
- Height: 6 ft 3 in (191 cm)
- Weight: 205 lb (93 kg; 14 st 9 lb)
- Position: Defence
- Shoots: Left
- GET-ligaen team Former teams: Stavanger Oilers; Lillehammer IK; Trondheim Ishockeyklubb
- National team: Norway
- NHL draft: Undrafted
- Playing career: 2005–present

Henrik Sørgård Solberg (born April 15, 1987 in Trondheim) is a Norwegian ice hockey defenceman currently playing for the Stavanger Oilers of the Norwegian GET-ligaen.

== Playing career ==
Solberg made his professional debut with Lillehammer IK during the 2005–06 season, while in his last year at NTG High School (Norges Toppidrettsgymnas) in Lillehammer.

After graduating from NTG, he went back home to Trondheim to play for Trondheim Ishockeyklubb, where he played for two seasons. On March 3, 2008, after years of financial struggle, Trondheim Ishockeyklubb was discontinued.

On April 22, 2008, Solberg signed a two-year deal with the Stavanger Oilers.

== International play ==
He has participated at the 2010 IIHF World Championship, the 2012 IIHF World Championship and the 2013 IIHF World Championship as a member of the Norway men's national ice hockey team.

On January 7, 2014, he was named to Team Norway's official 2014 Winter Olympics roster.

== Career statistics ==
=== Regular season and playoffs ===
			Regular season					Playoffs
Season	Team	League	GP	G	A	Pts	PIM	GP	G	A	Pts	PIM
2003–04	Lillehammer IK	NOR U19	6	0	2	2	4	—	—	—	—	—
2004–05	Lillehammer IK	NOR U17	17	2	8	10	22	—	—	—	—	—
2005–06	Lillehammer IK	NOR	2	0	0	0	2	—	—	—	—	—
2006–07	Trondheim Ishockeyklubb	NOR	41	2	9	11	44	—	—	—	—	—
2007–08	Trondheim Ishockeyklubb	NOR	39	3	9	12	36	—	—	—	—	—
2008–09	Stavanger Oilers	NOR	44	1	4	5	24	6	0	0	0	4
2009–10	Stavanger Oilers	NOR	45	4	16	20	44	18	1	9	10	32
2010–11	Stavanger Oilers	NOR	43	3	15	18	71	16	2	4	6	36
2011–12	Stavanger Oilers	NOR	37	4	8	12	68	11	0	0	0	10
2012–13	Stavanger Oilers	NOR	24	1	4	5	45	17	1	2	3	14
2013–14	Stavanger Oilers	NOR	41	3	11	14	42	17	0	2	2	10
2014–15	Stavanger Oilers	NOR	44	6	19	25	18	15	2	4	6	12
2015–16	Stavanger Oilers	NOR	41	3	10	13	14	15	0	3	3	4
2016–17	Stavanger Oilers	NOR	45	0	14	14	20	14	0	1	1	6
2017–18	Stavanger Oilers	NOR	25	0	4	4	4	—	—	—	—	—
NOR totals			471	30	123	153	432	123	6	25	31	138

=== International ===
Year	Team	Event	GP	G	A	Pts	PIM
2005	Norway	WJC18 D1	5	0	0	0	8
2007	Norway	WJC D1	5	0	1	1	0
2010	Norway	WC	6	1	0	1	2
2012	Norway	WC	8	0	1	1	4
2013	Norway	WC	4	0	0	0	2
2014	Norway	OG	4	0	0	0	2
Junior totals			10	0	1	1	8
Senior totals			22	1	1	2	10
