= Robbie Bina =

American ice hockey player

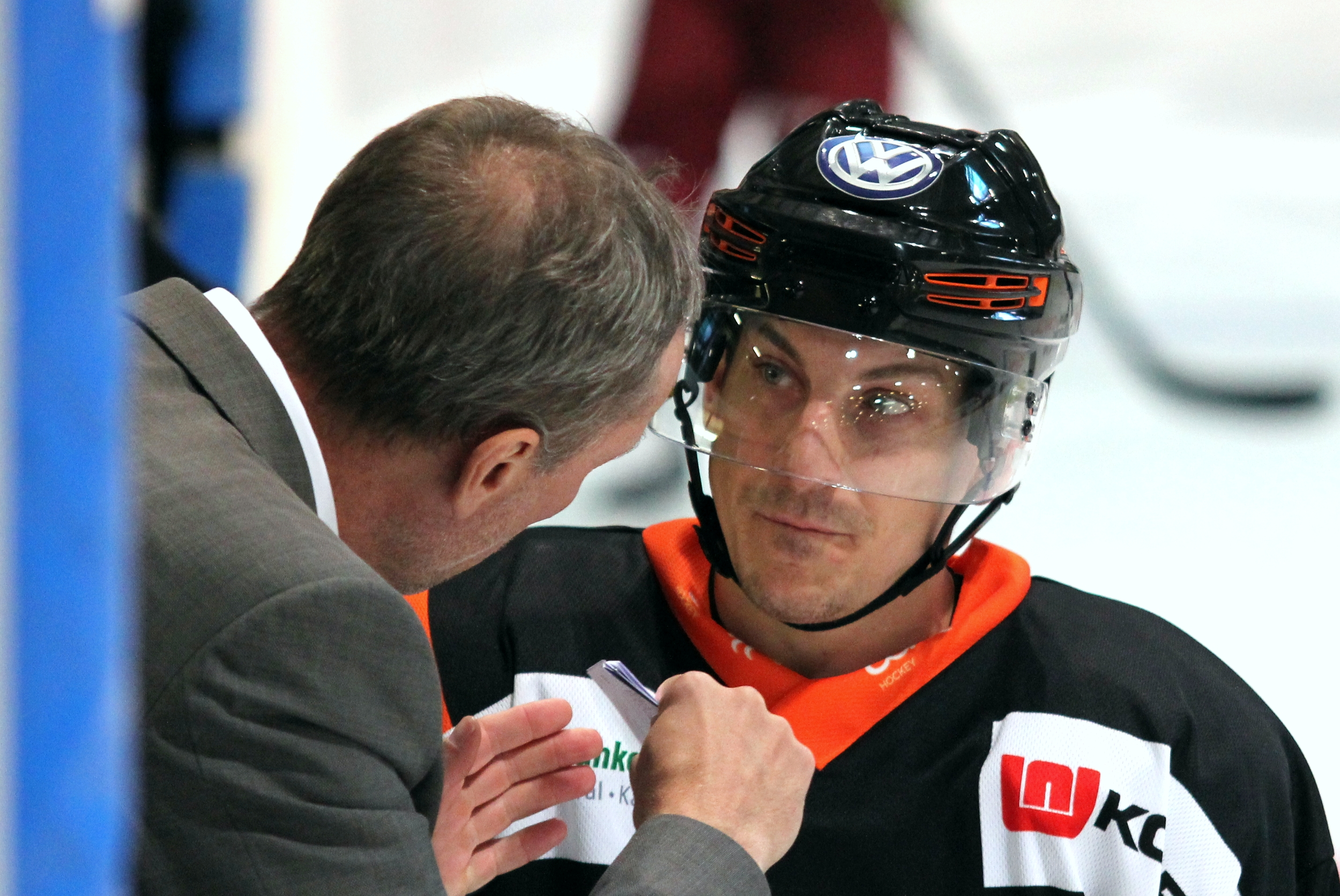
- Born: January 4, 1983 (age 43) Grand Forks, North Dakota, U.S.
- Height: 5 ft 8 in (173 cm)
- Weight: 181 lb (82 kg; 12 st 13 lb)
- Position: Defense
- Shoots: Right
- team Former teams: Free Agent; Springfield Falcons; San Antonio Rampage; Stavanger Oilers; Grizzlys Wolfsburg
- NHL draft: Undrafted
- Playing career: 2008–present

Robert "Robbie" Bina (born January 4, 1983) is an American professional ice hockey defenseman who is currently an unrestricted free agent. He most recently played for the Grizzlys Wolfsburg of the Deutsche Eishockey Liga (DEL). A graduate of the University of North Dakota, Bina overcame a serious injury in his sophomore year to start his professional career in American minor league hockey in 2008. With the Las Vegas Wranglers in his second season, Bina developed an offensive talent that was rewarded with a starting position in the 2010 ECHL All-Star Game, although he chose to forgo the opportunity in favor of playing overseas. In Norway, he helped the Stavanger Oilers win their first ever title, the 2010 Norwegian Championship, and was named the most valuable player of the tournament. He was subsequently signed by Wolfsburg on a one-year contract.

== Playing career ==
=== College ===
Robbie Bina, a native of Grand Forks, attended the University of North Dakota from 2003 to 2008. While there, he was a member of the university's Fighting Sioux ice hockey team (he also played American football and baseball), competing in the Western Collegiate Hockey Association (WCHA) of the NCAA. In his debut season, Bina led the Fighting Sioux rookie defensemen with eight points in 31 games, scoring the first goal of his college hockey career against the Denver Pioneers on November 21, 2003.

In the Semi-final of the 2005 WCHA playoffs against Denver, Bina sustained a career-threatening injury during a delayed penalty call against North Dakota. Having reached for the puck to stop play, he was hit illegally from behind by Denver winger Geoff Paukovich, causing him to crash into the boards and break his neck. Paukovich, who was "deeply regretful" about the incident, initially received a two-minute minor penalty for boarding, but was later given a one-game suspension by the NCAA and another from his coach, George Gwozdecky. Bina underwent surgery to repair a shattered vertebra and was out for the remainder of the WCHA and NCAA tournaments (in which the Fighting Sioux reached the Final of the Frozen Four), as well as the entire 2005–06 season.

Having fully recovered from his injury, Bina returned with a more offensive game in 2006–07, recording 10 goals and 22 assists in 43 games and helping his team reach their third consecutive Frozen Four. With 32 points in the season, he ranked first among the Fighting Sioux defensemen and fourth overall; on a national level he ranked fifteenth among defensemen in points per game. He scored two short handed goals, including one from 170 feet out against Minnesota. In the 2007–08 season, his senior year, Bina recorded two goals and 23 assists in 43 games, including a career high three assists against Colorado College on November 2, 2007, and was ranked second overall in terms of number of assists. North Dakota made the Frozen Four yet again, and Bina was named to the WCHA All-Academic team for the second year in a row.

=== Professional ===
Upon graduating from the University of North Dakota, Robbie Bina signed his first professional contract with the Edmonton Oilers organization in July 2008, a one-year, two-way deal with affiliates, the Springfield Falcons of the AHL and Stockton Thunder of the ECHL. Appearing at the Edmonton training camp in September, he was "reunited" with Geoff Paukovich, who had played for Stockton since 2007. Having never spoken to each other about the incident until then, the two settled their differences quickly, becoming close teammates and friends. Bina ended up splitting the season between the AHL and ECHL, with similar results on each level: eight points in 37 games with the Falcons and eight points in 28 games with the Thunder. He enjoyed a solid postseason, scoring six points in 14 games with the Thunder, who were eventually eliminated in the Division Finals.

A free agent, Bina moved to Las Vegas ahead of the 2009–10 season, joining the Las Vegas Wranglers of the ECHL. Having produced only modest offensive results during his rookie season, he was given the chance by Wranglers coach Ryan Mougenel to show off more of his playmaking potential, to which he responded positively. "He's never been put in that role as someone who can be counted on for offensive output. That's what he needed... He just skates so well. He's got great wheels and great vision. He creates that second wave of attack, which actually ends up paying dividends." Bina scored three goals and made 11 assists in 14 games; on November 17, he was signed to a professional try-out with affiliates San Antonio Rampage of the AHL, but was released on December 7 after making only two appearances. Back in Las Vegas, Bina continued where he had left off, picking up another goal and three assists before the end of 2009, placing him near the top of the points standings among defensemen in the league. On December 31 he was selected as a starter in the 2010 ECHL All-Star Game. "It's great to be chosen... There are going to be a lot of great players and I'm lucky to be there, it's an exciting thing." Two weeks later, however, Bina left the Wranglers to play in Europe, thereby missing out on what would have been the first all-star game appearance of his career. On January 15, the Stavanger Oilers of the Norwegian Eliteserien announced that they had acquired his services until the end of the season.

Bina's stay in Norway was short but productive. With only 10 games left in the regular season, the American made little impact, with five points recorded in total, although Stavanger were able to advance from fifth to third place in the standings. Of far greater significance was his performance in the playoffs, where he scored four goals and made 16 assists to become the second leading points scorer. The Oilers knocked out Lørenskog in the Quarter-finals and the Sparta Warriors in Semi-finals, eventually taking home their first ever Norwegian Championship title by defeating perennial favourites Vålerenga in six games in the Finals. Bina was named most valuable player by the Norwegian Ice Hockey Association for his efforts, and was also selected to the league's All-Star Team.

Following the playoffs, the Oilers worked hard to get Bina on board for another season, but despite their best efforts, he elected instead to sign a one-year deal with the Grizzly Adams Wolfsburg of the Deutsche Eishockey Liga. Having scouted Bina during the playoffs, Grizzlys general manager Karl-Heinz Fliegauf described him as a very good skater who acted intelligently on the ice, especially during power plays. Fliegauf also emphasized Bina's right-handed shot when making the decision to sign him.

== Career statistics ==
			Regular season					Playoffs
Season	Team	League	GP	G	A	Pts	PIM	GP	G	A	Pts	PIM
2002–03	Lincoln Stars	USHL	34	4	9	13	29	10	0	6	6	6
2003–04	North Dakota Fighting Sioux	WCHA	31	1	7	8	6	—	—	—	—	—
2004–05	North Dakota Fighting Sioux	WCHA	32	0	9	9	8	—	—	—	—	—
2006–07	North Dakota Fighting Sioux	WCHA	43	10	22	32	46	—	—	—	—	—
2007–08	North Dakota Fighting Sioux	WCHA	43	2	23	25	42	—	—	—	—	—
2008–09	Stockton Thunder	ECHL	28	1	7	8	26	14	2	4	6	8
2008–09	Springfield Falcons	AHL	37	1	7	8	30	—	—	—	—	—
2009–10	Las Vegas Wranglers	ECHL	27	5	17	22	26	—	—	—	—	—
2009–10	San Antonio Rampage	AHL	2	0	1	1	0	—	—	—	—	—
2009–10	Stavanger Oilers	GET	10	2	3	5	4	18	4	16	20	4
2010–11	Grizzly Adams Wolfsburg	DEL	52	2	18	20	48	9	0	2	2	4
2011–12	Grizzly Adams Wolfsburg	DEL	52	4	19	23	22	4	0	0	0	2
2012–13	Grizzly Adams Wolfsburg	DEL	52	6	14	20	28	12	1	2	3	0
2013–14	Grizzly Adams Wolfsburg	DEL	51	3	15	18	57	11	1	2	3	6
2014–15	Grizzly Adams Wolfsburg	DEL	46	11	12	23	40	4	0	2	2	2
2015–16	Grizzlys Wolfsburg	DEL	51	11	9	20	30	13	1	2	3	10
2016–17	Grizzlys Wolfsburg	DEL	24	6	5	11	18	15	1	4	5	6
2017–18	Grizzlys Wolfsburg	DEL	36	3	11	14	8	4	1	0	1	0
DEL totals			364	46	103	149	251	72	5	14	19	30

== Awards and honors ==
Award	Year
College
All-WCHA Third Team	2007–08
