= Erik Lewerström =

Swedish ice hockey player

- Born: May 28, 1980 (age 45); Grums, SWE
- Height: 6 ft 2 in (188 cm)
- Weight: 205 lb (93 kg; 14 st 9 lb)
- Position: Defence
- Shot: Right
- Played for: Grums IK; Färjestad BK; MIF Redhawks; Nybro Vikings IF; Sparta Sarpsborg
- NHL draft: 168th overall, 1999; Phoenix Coyotes
- Playing career: 1997–2011

Erik Lewerström (born May 28, 1980, in Grums, Sweden) is a professional Swedish ice hockey player.

He is currently playing for the Sparta Sarpsborg in the Norwegian GET-ligaen. He has played with Sparta since 2007. Before signing with Sparta he had played in Swedish Elite League for Färjestads BK and Malmö Redhawks. He has also represented Grums IK and Nybro IF in the Allsvenskan. In 2002 he won the Swedish Championship while playing for Färjestads BK.

He represented Sweden in the World Junior Hockey Championships in 2000.

== Career statistics ==
			Regular season					Playoffs
Season	Team	League	GP	G	A	Pts	PIM	GP	G	A	Pts	PIM
1996–97	Grums IK J18	J18 Elit	—	—	—	—	—	—	—	—	—	—
1996–97	Grums IK J20	J20 Elit	—	—	—	—	—	—	—	—	—	—
1996–97	Grums IK	Division 1	1	0	0	0	0	—	—	—	—	—
1997–98	Grums IK J18	J18 Div.1	—	—	—	—	—	—	—	—	—	—
1997–98	Grums IK J20	J20 Elit	—	—	—	—	—	—	—	—	—	—
1997–98	Grums IK	Division 1	4	0	0	0	2	—	—	—	—	—
1998–99	Grums IK J20	J20 Elit	—	—	—	—	—	—	—	—	—	—
1998–99	Grums IK	Division 1	29	3	9	12	42	—	—	—	—	—
1999–00	Grums IK	Allsvenskan	37	5	7	12	88	—	—	—	—	—
2000–01	Färjestad BK J20	J20 SuperElit	1	0	0	0	0	—	—	—	—	—
2000–01	Färjestad BK	Elitserien	45	4	0	4	45	14	0	0	0	27
2001–02	Färjestad BK J20	J20 SuperElit	5	2	0	2	6	—	—	—	—	—
2001–02	Färjestad BK	Elitserien	39	0	0	0	51	6	0	0	0	0
2001–02	MIF Redhawks	Elitserien	2	0	0	0	2	—	—	—	—	—
2002–03	Grums IK	Division 1	—	—	—	—	—	6	0	0	0	27
2003–04	Nybro Vikings IF	Allsvenskan	33	3	4	7	40	2	1	0	1	0
2004–05	Nybro Vikings IF	Allsvenskan	30	1	5	6	46	—	—	—	—	—
2005–06	Nybro Vikings IF	HockeyAllsvenskan	32	4	4	8	32	—	—	—	—	—
2006–07	Nybro Vikings IF	HockeyAllsvenskan	36	1	3	4	28	—	—	—	—	—
2007–08	Sparta Sarpsborg	Norway	36	3	10	13	114	—	—	—	—	—
2008–09	Sparta Sarpsborg	Norway	33	6	5	11	74	—	—	—	—	—
2009–10	Sparta Sarpsborg	Norway	34	1	6	7	81	12	1	2	3	18
2010–11	Grums IK 2	Division 3	5	0	0	0	12	—	—	—	—	—
Elitserien totals			86	4	0	4	98	20	0	0	0	27
HockeyAllsvenskan totals			68	5	7	12	60	—	—	—	—	—
Allsvenskan totals			100	9	16	25	174	2	1	0	1	0
Norway totals			103	10	21	31	269	12	1	2	3	18
