= Regan Kelly =

Canadian ice hockey player

- Born: 9 March 1981 (age 45) Watrous, Saskatchewan, Canada
- Height: 6 ft 02 in (188 cm)
- Weight: 195 lb (88 kg; 13 st 13 lb)
- Position: Defence
- Shot: Left
- Played for: St. John's Maple Leafs; Milano Vipers; Vålerenga; Bolzano-Bozen; Sheffield Steelers
- NHL draft: 259th overall, 2000; Philadelphia Flyers
- Playing career: 2002–2011

Regan Kelly (born 9 March 1981) is a Canadian former professional ice hockey defenceman. Kelly was born in Watrous, Saskatchewan, and raised in Imperial, Saskatchewan.

== Draft ==
Kelly was drafted 259th overall by the Philadelphia Flyers in the 2000 NHL entry draft but never played in the National Hockey League.

== Career ==
After turning pro from Providence College in 2002, he spent three seasons in the American Hockey League for the St. John's Maple Leafs. He then moved to the United Hockey League with the Danbury Thrashers and also had a brief spell in the Elite Ice Hockey League in the United Kingdom for the Sheffield Steelers.

He then briefly played in Italy's Serie A league for Bolzano-Bozen before moving to the GET-ligaen in Norway, playing for Vålerenga and winning the championship. In 2007, Kelly returned to Italy, signing with the Hockey Club Junior Milano Vipers.

== Awards and honors ==
Award	Year
Hockey East All-Tournament Team	2001
All-Hockey East Rookie Team	2000–01

== Career statistics ==
			Regular season					Playoffs
Season	Team	League	GP	G	A	Pts	PIM	GP	G	A	Pts	PIM
1998–99	Nipawin Hawks	SJHL	52	4	14	18	30	—	—	—	—	—
1999–2000	Nipawin Hawks	SJHL	46	8	21	29	20	—	—	—	—	—
2000–01	Providence College	HE	36	4	21	25	58	—	—	—	—	—
2001–02	Providence College	HE	38	6	10	16	48	—	—	—	—	—
2002–03	St. John's Maple Leafs	AHL	71	3	15	18	36	—	—	—	—	—
2003–04	St. John's Maple Leafs	AHL	55	2	9	11	42	—	—	—	—	—
2004–05	St. John's Maple Leafs	AHL	52	0	10	10	76	2	0	0	0	0
2005–06	Sheffield Steelers	EIHL	6	0	1	1	4	—	—	—	—	—
2005–06	Danbury Thrashers	UHL	39	5	17	22	56	—	—	—	—	—
2006–07	HC Bolzano	ITA	4	2	0	2	14	—	—	—	—	—
2006–07	Vålerenga Ishockey	NOR	11	2	8	10	40	—	—	—	—	—
2007–08	Milano Vipers	ITA	39	4	16	20	46	—	—	—	—	—
2008–09	Vålerenga Ishockey	NOR	44	4	28	32	97	5	0	2	2	2
2009–10	Vålerenga Ishockey	NOR	34	3	12	15	56	16	1	3	4	20
2010–11	Vålerenga Ishockey	NOR	41	6	14	20	40	—	—	—	—	—
AHL totals			178	5	34	39	154	2	0	0	0	0
NOR totals			130	15	62	77	233	21	1	5	6	22
