= Jonas Djupvik Løvlie =

Norwegian ice hockey player

- Born: October 14, 1990 (age 34); Oslo, Norway
- Height: 6 ft 2 in (188 cm)
- Weight: 192 lb (87 kg; 13 st 10 lb)
- Position: Forward
- Shoots: Left
- GET team Former teams: Storhamar Ishockey; Manglerud Star; Sparta Warriors; Södertälje SK; Lørenskog IK; Stavanger Oilers
- National team: Norway
- Playing career: 2006–present

Jonas Djupvik Løvlie (born 14 October 1990) is a Norwegian ice hockey player. He is currently playing for Storhamar Ishockey. He took part in the 2014 and 2015 IIHF World Championships.
