= Marius Trygg =

Norwegian ice hockey player

- Born: 1 June 1976 (age 48); Norway
- Height: 5 ft 10 in (178 cm)
- Weight: 174 lb (79 kg; 12 st 6 lb)
- Position: Forward
- Shoots: Left
- GET team Former teams: Manglerud Star; Lørenskog IK; Stavanger Oilers; ETC Crimmitschau; Nybro Vikings; Hammarby; Färjestad; Spektrum Flyers
- National team: Norway
- Playing career: 1994–present

Marius Trygg (born 1 June 1976 in Norway) is a Norwegian ice hockey forward. He is currently playing for Manglerud Star in GET-ligaen.

== Career ==
=== Early career ===
He started his senior career with Spektrum Flyers in 1994 and played two seasons before signing with Manglerud Star in 1996. He stayed there for three seasons, before moving abroad.

=== Moving abroad ===
In 1999 he signed with the Swedish Elitserien club Färjestad and won the Swedish Championship with them in 2002. He played there for four seasons, before getting signed by Hammarby in HockeyAllsvenskan. He played there only one season before he transferred to Nybro Vikings in the same league. He played another single season in Sweden, before moving to Germany and ETC Crimmitschau.

=== Back home ===
In 2006, Trygg moved home to Norway and signed for Stavanger Oilers, winning the Norwegian Championship in 2010.

== Personal life ==
His twin brother, Mats Trygg, also plays ice hockey, as well as their younger brother Mathias.
