= Eric Werner =

American ice hockey player (born 1983)

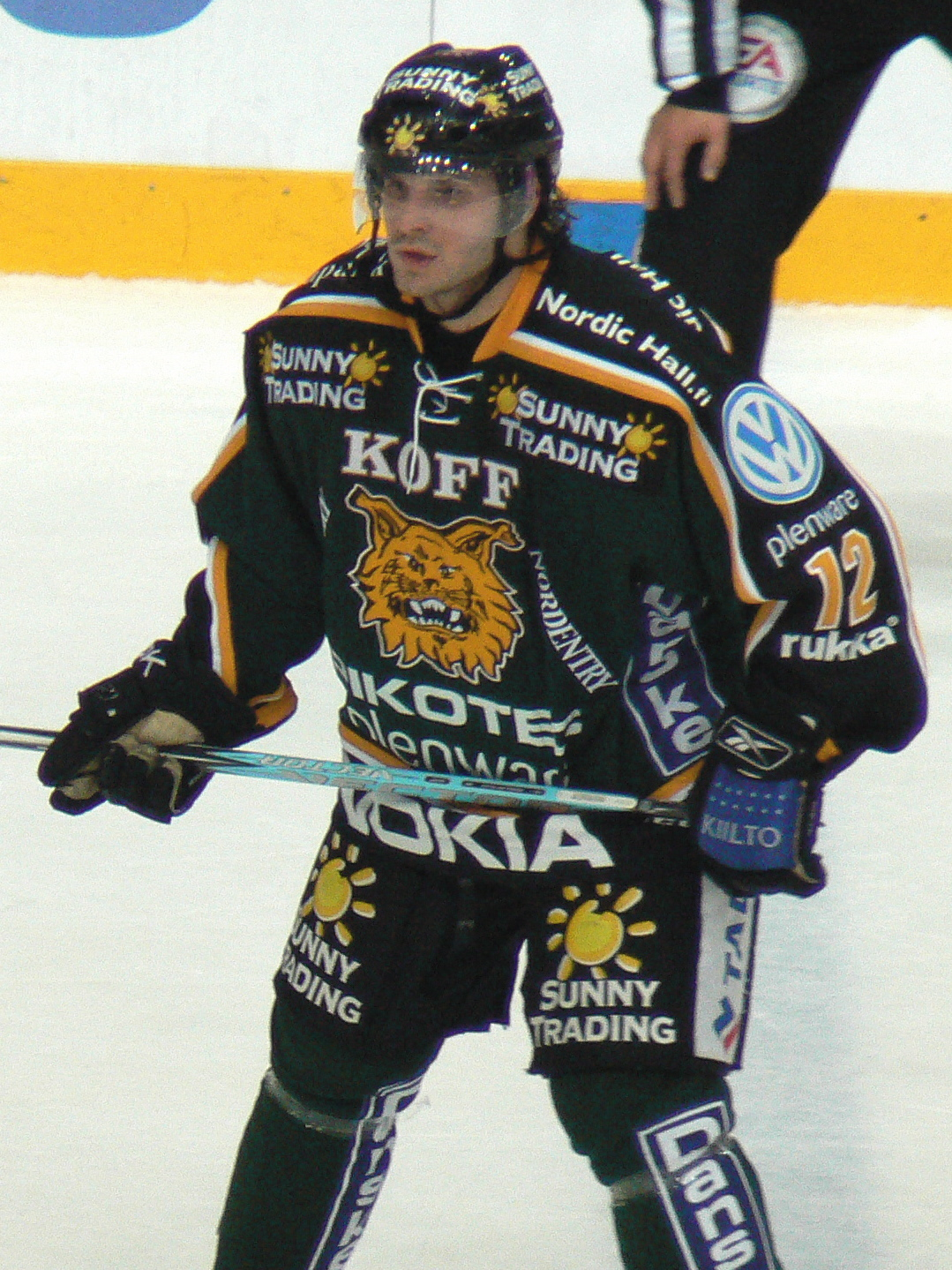
- Born: January 26, 1983 (age 43) Grosse Pointe Woods, MI
- Height: 5 ft 10 in (178 cm)
- Weight: 185 lb (84 kg; 13 st 3 lb)
- Position: Defenseman
- Shot: Right
- Playing career: 2005–2014

Eric Werner (born January 26, 1983) is a retired American ice hockey defenseman. He is a 1-time EIHL champion with the Nottingham Panthers, and a 1-time SIHL champion with Jesenice.

== Career statistics ==
| | | | Regular season | | | | | Playoffs |
| Season | Team | League | GP | G | A | Pts | PIM | GP | G | A | Pts | PIM |
|---|---|---|---|---|---|---|---|---|---|---|---|---|
| 1999–00 | U.S. National Under-18 Team | NAHL | 29 | 8 | 7 | 15 | 24 | — | — | — | — | — |
| 1999–00 | U.S. Junior National Team | USHL | 7 | 0 | 1 | 1 | 10 | — | — | — | — | — |
| 2000–01 | Sioux Falls Stampede | USHL | 55 | 6 | 36 | 42 | 67 | 7 | 0 | 2 | 2 | 12 |
| 2001–02 | University of Michigan | NCAA | 43 | 5 | 20 | 25 | 44 | — | — | — | — | — |
| 2002–03 | University of Michigan | NCAA | 20 | 4 | 9 | 13 | 30 | — | — | — | — | — |
| 2003–04 | University of Michigan | NCAA | 42 | 9 | 14 | 23 | 36 | — | — | — | — | — |
| 2004–05 | University of Michigan | NCAA | 39 | 8 | 23 | 31 | 48 | — | — | — | — | — |
| 2005–06 | Manchester Monarchs | AHL | 15 | 0 | 7 | 7 | 10 | — | — | — | — | — |
| 2005–06 | Reading Royals | ECHL | 58 | 12 | 30 | 42 | 38 | 4 | 2 | 3 | 5 | 2 |
| 2006–07 | Manchester Monarchs | AHL | 59 | 5 | 24 | 29 | 31 | — | — | — | — | — |
| 2006–07 | Reading Royals | ECHL | 8 | 3 | 4 | 7 | 4 | — | — | — | — | — |
| 2007–08 | Ilves Tampere | FNL | 28 | 3 | 7 | 10 | 18 | — | — | — | — | — |
| 2007–08 | Düsseldorfer EG | DEL | 23 | 1 | 4 | 5 | 14 | 13 | 0 | 0 | 0 | 4 |
| 2008–09 | Manchester Monarchs | AHL | 15 | 1 | 2 | 3 | 10 | — | — | — | — | — |
| 2008–09 | Augsburger Panther | DEL | 15 | 0 | 4 | 4 | 37 | 4 | 0 | 0 | 0 | 6 |
| 2009-10 | Reading Royals | ECHL | 38 | 3 | 15 | 18 | 25 | — | — | — | — | — |
| 2009-10 | Vålerenga | GET | 7 | 0 | 4 | 42 | 16 | 2 | 3 | 5 | 18 | — |
| 2010-11 | Jesenice | EBEL/SIHL | 55 | 9 | 13 | 22 | 57 | 4 | 4 | 0 | 4 | 2 |
| 2011-12 | Neumarkt | Serie A | 42 | 10 | 19 | 29 | 22 | 10 | 2 | 2 | 4 | 6 |
| 2012-13 | Nottingham Panthers | EIHL | 52 | 4 | 25 | 29 | 24 | 4 | 1 | 4 | 5 | 2 |
| 2013-14 | Nottingham Panthers | EIHL | 29 | 2 | 6 | 8 | 16 | 2 | 0 | 0 | 0 | 0 |

== Awards and honours ==
| Award | Year |
|---|---|
| All-CCHA Rookie Team | 2001-02 |
| EIHL First Team All-Star | 2012–13 |
