= Knut Henrik Spets =

Norwegian ice hockey player

- Born: 7 November 1982 (age 42); Trondheim, Norway
- Height: 6 ft 2 in (188 cm)
- Weight: 200 lb (91 kg; 14 st 4 lb)
- Position: Forward
- Shoots: Right
- GET team Former teams: Free agent Lillehammer; Trondheim Black Panthers; Storhamar Dragons; Arboga; Nyköping; Vålerenga; Lørenskog
- National team: Norway
- Playing career: 2000–present

Knut Henrik Spets (born 7 November 1982 in Trondheim) is a Norwegian professional ice hockey player, who is currently a free agent. He is the older brother of fellow Norwegian international Lars Erik Spets

== Club career ==
=== Early career ===
He started his career with Lillehammer in the 2000–01 GET-ligaen season, and Trondheim Black Panthers in the 2001–02 season, before moving to Storhamar Dragons before the 2002–03 season.

=== Moving abroad ===
In 2006, he signed with the Swedish team Arboga in HockeyAllsvenskan, where he played 40 matches before moving to Nyköping.

=== Back home ===
23 May 2008, Spets decided to move back to Norway and play for Vålerenga Ishockey. Four months later he got united with his younger brother, Lars Erik Spets, when he signed for the same club. In the 2009–10 GET-ligaen season, he finished fourth in the point statistics.

== International career ==
Spets played for the Norwegian national team during the 2007 and 2010 IIHF World Championships. He has also played in national youth teams from the age of 17.
