= Casper Santanen =

Finnish-Norwegian ice hockey defenceman

- Born: April 28, 1987 (age 39) Oslo, Norway
- Height: 6 ft 0 in (183 cm)
- Weight: 168 lb (76 kg; 12 st 0 lb)
- Position: Defenceman
- Shoots: Left
- GET-ligaen team Former teams: Narvik Ishockey; EfB Ishockey; TPS; Manglerud Star Ishockey
- Playing career: 2003–present

Casper Santanen (born April 28, 1987) is a Norwegian-born Finnish professional ice hockey defenceman playing for Narvik Ishockey of the GET-ligaen.

== Career ==
Santanen was born in Oslo, Norway but grew up in Finland and began his career with UJK of Mestis, playing two games during the 2002–03 Mestis season, in which the team were relegated to Suomi-sarja. He then spent three seasons with TPS's junior teams as well as playing four more games for UJK during the 2005–06 season. He then moved to Lukko the following season and spent two seasons playing for their junior team before moving to Denmark to sign for EfB Ishockey.

In 2008, Santanen returned to TPS and played 50 regular season games, scoring one goal and one assist in his only season in the SM-liiga. The following year he moved to his birth country Norway to sign for Manglerud Star Ishockey of the GET-ligaen and remained until December 2010 when he returned to EfB.

On June 4, 2012, Santanen returned to Finland to sign for Hokki of Mestis. He spent two seasons with the team before going back to Norway to play for Narvik Hockey of the second level First Division on September 29, 2014. He moved to fellow First Division side Bergen IK on May 5, 2016, but returned to Narvik a year later. The team won promotion to the GET-ligaen for the first time in 2019 and Santanen was named captain for the team's inaugural top level season.
