= Fredrik Sundin =

Swedish ice hockey player

- Born: June 4, 1981 (age 43); Avesta, Sweden
- Height: 6 ft 00 in (183 cm)
- Weight: 205 lb (93 kg; 14 st 9 lb)
- Position: Forward
- Shoots: left
- GET-ligaen team: Stavanger Oilers
- Playing career: 2000–present

Fredrik Sundin (born June 4, 1981) is a professional Swedish ice hockey player.

== Career ==
Sundin Stavanger Oilers in the Norwegian GET-ligaen. He has played with Stavanger since 2005. Before signing with Stavanger had he played in Swedish Elite League for Färjestads BK and Timrå IK. He has also represented Bofors IK in the Allsvenskan. In 2002 he won the Swedish Championship while playing for Färjestads BK.

He represented Sweden in the World Junior Ice Hockey Championships in 2001.
