= Mathias Trygg =

Norwegian ice hockey player

- Born: 15 March 1986 (age 40) Oslo, Norway
- Height: 5 ft 9 in (175 cm)
- Weight: 168 lb (76 kg; 12 st 0 lb)
- Position: Wing
- Shoots: Left
- GET team Former teams: Vålerenga; IF Björklöven; Lørenskog; Västerås; MODO; Skåre; Manglerud Star
- National team: Norway
- Playing career: 2002–present

Mathias Trygg (born 15 March 1986 in Oslo) is a Norwegian professional ice hockey winger, who currently plays for Vålerenga of the Norwegian GET-ligaen.

== Club career ==
He started his senior career with Manglerud Star in 2002, and played two seasons before moving to Sweden to play for Skåre. He stayed there only one season before moving back to Norway and Manglerud Star.

The 2005–06 season was kind of a break-out season for Trygg, and after the conclusion of the season he signed for the current Norwegian Champions, Vålerenga. He went on to win the Championship twice with Vålerenga, before deciding to move abroad again in 2010.

In 2010, he signed for Modo of the Swedish Elitserien, playing only 12 matches before getting loaned out to HockeyAllsvenskan club Västerås. He stayed there for two more matches before returning to Norway and Vålerenga.

For the 2014–15 season, Trygg signed for HockeyAllsvenskan club IF Björklöven, but returned to Vålerenga after a couple of months.

== Personal life ==
His older twin brothers, Marius and Mats, also play ice hockey, for Manglerud Star and Lørenskog respectively.
