= Jan Sochor =

Czech ice hockey forward (born 1980)

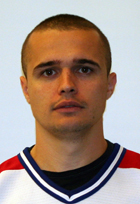
- Born: January 17, 1980 (age 46) Ústí nad Labem, Czechoslovakia
- Height: 6 ft 0 in (183 cm)
- Weight: 205 lb (93 kg; 14 st 9 lb)
- Position: Forward
- Shot: Right
- Played for: HC Slavia Praha; HC Vsetín; Lillehammer IK; Stjernen Hockey; HKM Zvolen
- NHL draft: 161st overall, 1999; Toronto Maple Leafs
- Playing career: 1997–2014

Jan Sochor (born January 17, 1980) is a Czech professional ice hockey forward.

Sochor played 194 games in the Czech Extraliga for HC Slavia Praha and HC Vsetín between 1997 and 2004. He also played in the GET-ligaen for Lillehammer IK and Stjernen Hockey and in the Slovak Extraliga for HKM Zvolen.

Sochor was drafted 161st overall by the Toronto Maple Leafs in the 1999 NHL entry draft but he never played in the NHL.
