= Johan Molin =

Swedish ice hockey player

- Born: October 25, 1976 (age 49) Nacka, Sweden
- Height: 5 ft 7 in (170 cm)
- Weight: 182 lb (83 kg; 13 st 0 lb)
- Position: Right wing
- Shot: Right
- Played for: VIK Västerås HK; Brynäs IF; Ayr Scottish Eagles; HC TWK Innsbruck; DEG Metro Stars; Hammarby IF; HC Fassa; Manchester Phoenix; Nottingham Panthers; Sparta Warriors; Bajen Fans Hockey
- Playing career: 1997–2012

Johan Molin (born October 25, 1976) is a professional Swedish ice hockey player.

Molin began his career playing in the Elitserien, or Swedish Elite League, for VIK Västerås HK. In his debut season, at just 21 years old, he played in over thirty games for the club. Molin became an important player for Västerås, and remained there for two further seasons, with his points return improving each season. In his final season with Västerås, Molin totalled 22 points in 48 games.

For the following season, Molin switched clubs to play for the Brynäs IF, again in the Elitserien. He performed at a solid if unspectacular standard, but unfortunately was not re-signed by Brynas. He would take the opportunity to move to the U.K. and play for the ill-fated Ayr Scottish Eagles organisation, then playing in the ISL. In 15 games for the Eagles, Molin managed to net 12 points.

Due to limited opportunities despite his scoring, Molin moved again and played the 2002–03 season as a TWK Innsbruck player. In 42 games in the Austrian Hockey League, Molin scored 50 points with just 24 minutes of penalties against his name. His best season to date saw him acquired in the off-season by the DEG Metro Stars of the DEL. Molin played more than 50 times for the Metro Stars but failed to find his scoring touch, managing just 5 goals and 6 assists.

Despite this disappointment, Molin later found a new team and return home to Sweden to play for Hammarby IF at Allsvenskan level. He again failed to produce points on a regular basis and moved to sign for his seventh club, HC Fassa of the Italian Serie A. Molin's output improved significantly, and he scored 29 points in 42 games.

His potential was spotted by Tony Hand, the player-coach of the Manchester Phoenix, who took the opportunity to bring Molin to Manchester in the summer of 2006. It was a move that ignited Molin, who provided the Phoenix with a reliable goalscorer - in 60 EIHL games, Molin totalled 83 points, with 36 penalty minutes. His first season led to Molin's signature being sought by several clubs during the off-season. Molin decided to remain in the U.K., and agreed to play for the Nottingham Panthers in the 2007–08 season. He has again started well, and so far has managed a ratio in excess of one point per game for his new team. Molin resigned for the Nottingham Panthers for season 2008/09.

It was confirmed that Molin would not be returning to Nottingham for a third season in 2009-2010. However, when Kevin Bergin failed a fitness test before a game against the Coventry Blaze, he was drafted in for a game under the new EIHL rules whereby a club could retain up to 15 players requiring ITC cards on its books providing it only iced its allotted number of imports in any one game (Molin had been visiting friends in England that week).

Later that year, in preparation for the EIHL's inaugural "Twenty20" Hockey tournament, Molin came in to assist a weakened Nottingham Panthers team in the tournament.

Over the weekend of 12–13 December 2009, Molin again turned out for the Nottingham Panthers in games against the Newcastle Vipers (at Whitley Bay Ice Rink) and the Hull Stingrays (at the National Ice Centre). Molin scored a goal in regulation time against the Stingrays and again found the net as the game went to penalty shots, scoring what proved to be the winning goal.

After the game against Edinburgh on 19 December 2009, it is announced that Molin would remain with the Panthers on a full-time basis until the end of the season, leaving the Panthers with two extra imports, however before he was eventually picked up by the Norwegian elite team Sparta Warriors. As he was no success, and by the fans rated the biggest mistake ever to play in the club, he was released from the Norwegians right after they were eliminated in the playoffs (went to semifinals). He produced 2 points in 8 playoff-games, and 3 points during the regular season (only played 8 games during series as well).

Molin then signed for Bajen Fans IF, a supporter-operated club that was formed following the bankruptcy of Hammarby IF. He stayed for two seasons before retiring in 2012.
