= Robert Hestmann =

Norwegian ice hockey player

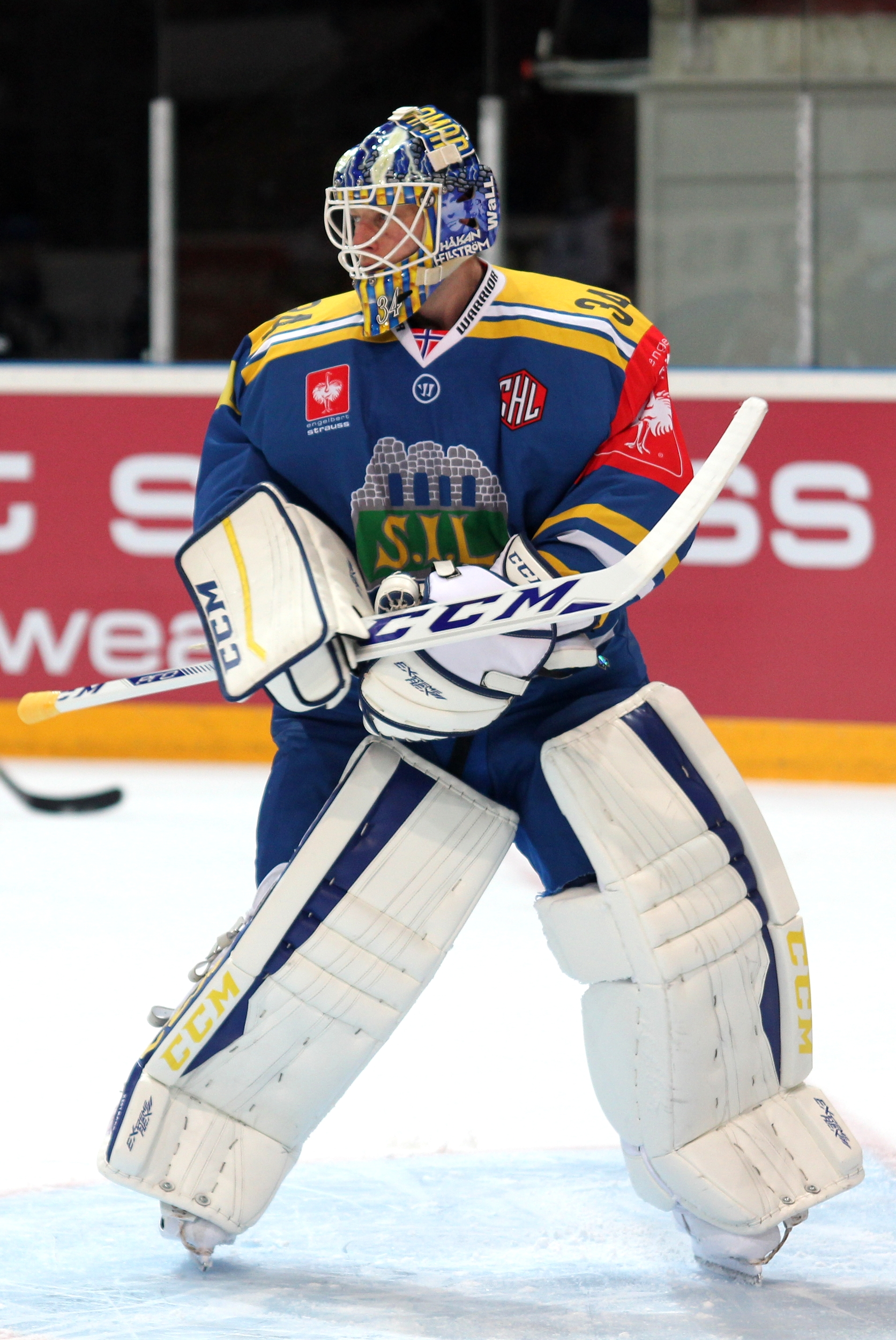
- Robert Hestmann (2015)
- Born: July 23, 1988 (age 36); Oslo, Norway
- Height: 6 ft 0 in (183 cm)
- Weight: 198 lb (90 kg; 14 st 2 lb)
- Position: Goaltender
- Catches: Right
- Div1 team Former teams: Kalmar HC; Storhamar; Visby/Roma; Huddinge; Lørenskog; Vålerenga; Hasle-Løren
- National team: Norway
- NHL draft: Undrafted
- Playing career: 2007–present

Robert Hestmann (born July 23, 1988) is a Norwegian professional ice hockey goaltender who is currently playing for Kalmar HC of the Swedish Hockeyettan.

He participated at the 2011 IIHF World Championship as a member of the Norway men's national ice hockey team.
