= Andreas Gröndahl =

Swedish ice hockey player

- Born: September 11, 1990 (age 35) Södertälje, Sweden
- Height: 5 ft 10 in (178 cm)
- Weight: 172 lb (78 kg; 12 st 4 lb)
- Position: Right wing
- Shot: Left
- Played for: Södertälje SK
- NHL draft: Undrafted
- Playing career: 2008–2017

Andreas Gröndahl (born September 11, 1990) is a former Swedish professional ice hockey winger who played for Södertälje SK of the Elitserien.
