= Dennis Sveum (ice hockey) =

Norwegian ice hockey player

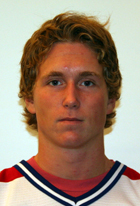
- Dennis Sveum
- Born: November 27, 1986 (age 38); Lillehammer, Norway
- Height: 6 ft 1 in (185 cm)
- Weight: 190 lb (86 kg; 13 st 8 lb)
- Position: Defence
- Shoots: Left
- GET team Former teams: Stavanger Oilers; Lillehammer IK
- National team: Norway
- Playing career: 2004–present

Dennis Sveum (born November 27, 1986) is a Norwegian ice hockey player for Stavanger Oilers and the Norwegian national team.

He participated at the 2017 IIHF World Championship.
