= Antti Ore =

Finnish ice hockey player (born 1979)

- Born: October 25, 1979 (age 45); Joutseno, Finland
- Height: 6 ft 2 in (188 cm)
- Weight: 187 lb (85 kg; 13 st 5 lb)
- Position: Goaltender
- Caught: Left
- SM-liiga team: Espoo Blues
- Playing career: 1999–2016

Antti Ore (born October 25, 1979) is a Finnish retired ice hockey goaltender. He played with Espoo Blues in the Finnish SM-liiga.

Ore made his SM-liiga debut playing with Espoo Blues during the 2011–12 SM-liiga season.
