= Stavanger Ishall =

Indoor ice hockey arena in Stavanger, Norway

Coordinates: 58°57′15″N 5°41′43″E

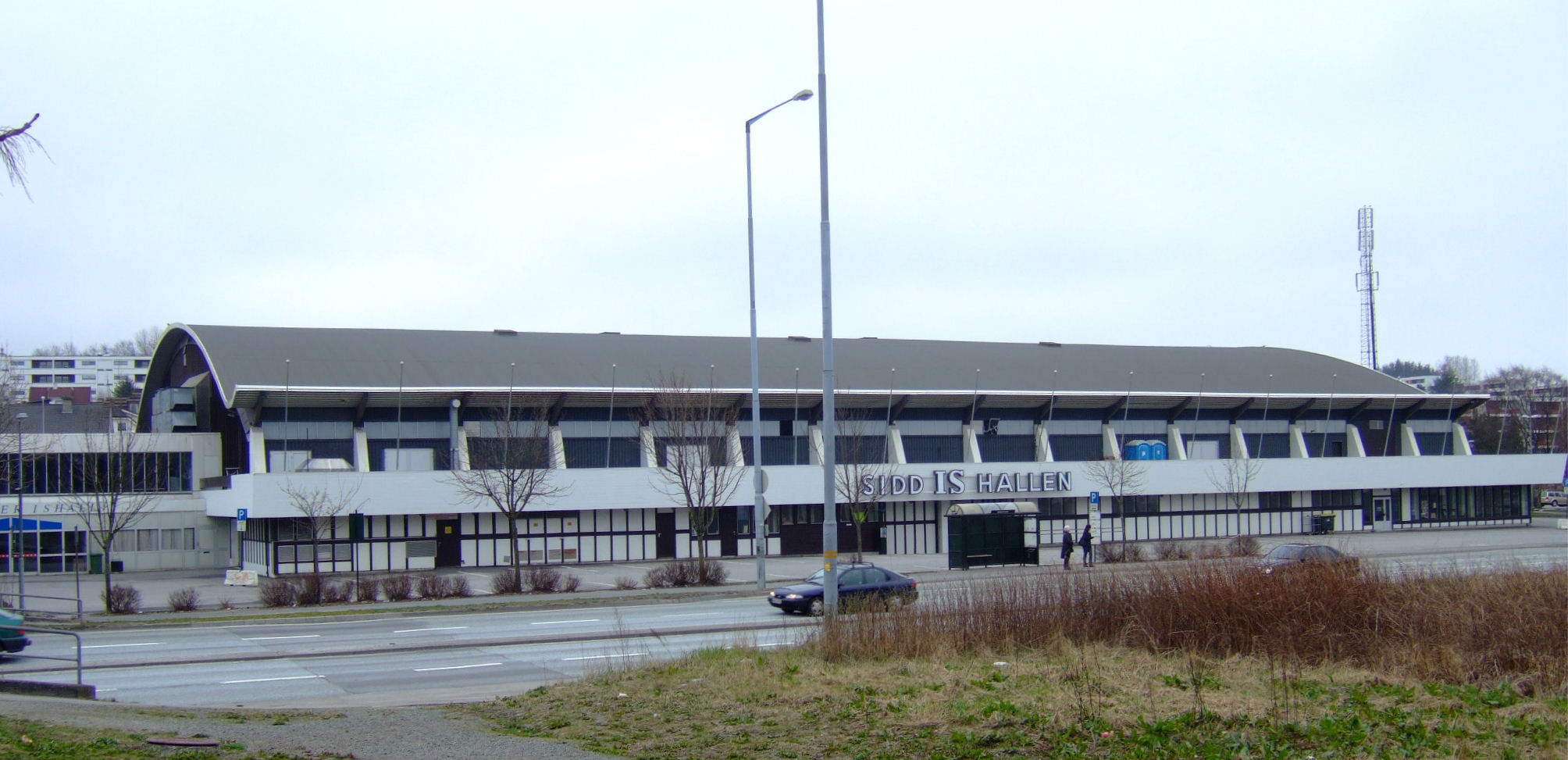
Stavanger Ishall aka Siddishallen

Stavanger Ishall, also known as Siddishallen, is an indoor ice hockey arena in Stavanger, Norway. It was built in 1968, as only the second arena ice hockey venue in Norway, and has a capacity of 3,090 people. The arena used to host the home games of ice hockey team Stavanger Oilers until 2012 when the team moved to newly built DNB Arena.
