= Andreas Hjelm =

Swedish ice hockey player

- Born: March 3, 1988 (age 37) Stockholm, Sweden
- Height: 5 ft 10 in (178 cm)
- Weight: 187 lb (85 kg; 13 st 5 lb)
- Position: Defence
- Shoots: Left
- Allsv team Former teams: Södertälje SK; Storhamar Dragons; Luleå HF; AIK IF
- Playing career: 2008–present

Andreas Hjelm (born March 3, 1988) is a Swedish ice hockey defenceman. He is currently playing with Södertälje SK of the HockeyAllsvenskan (Allsv).

Hjelm made his Swedish Hockey League debut playing with Luleå HF during the 2013–14 SHL season.
