= Joakim Jensen =

Norwegian ice hockey player (born 1987)

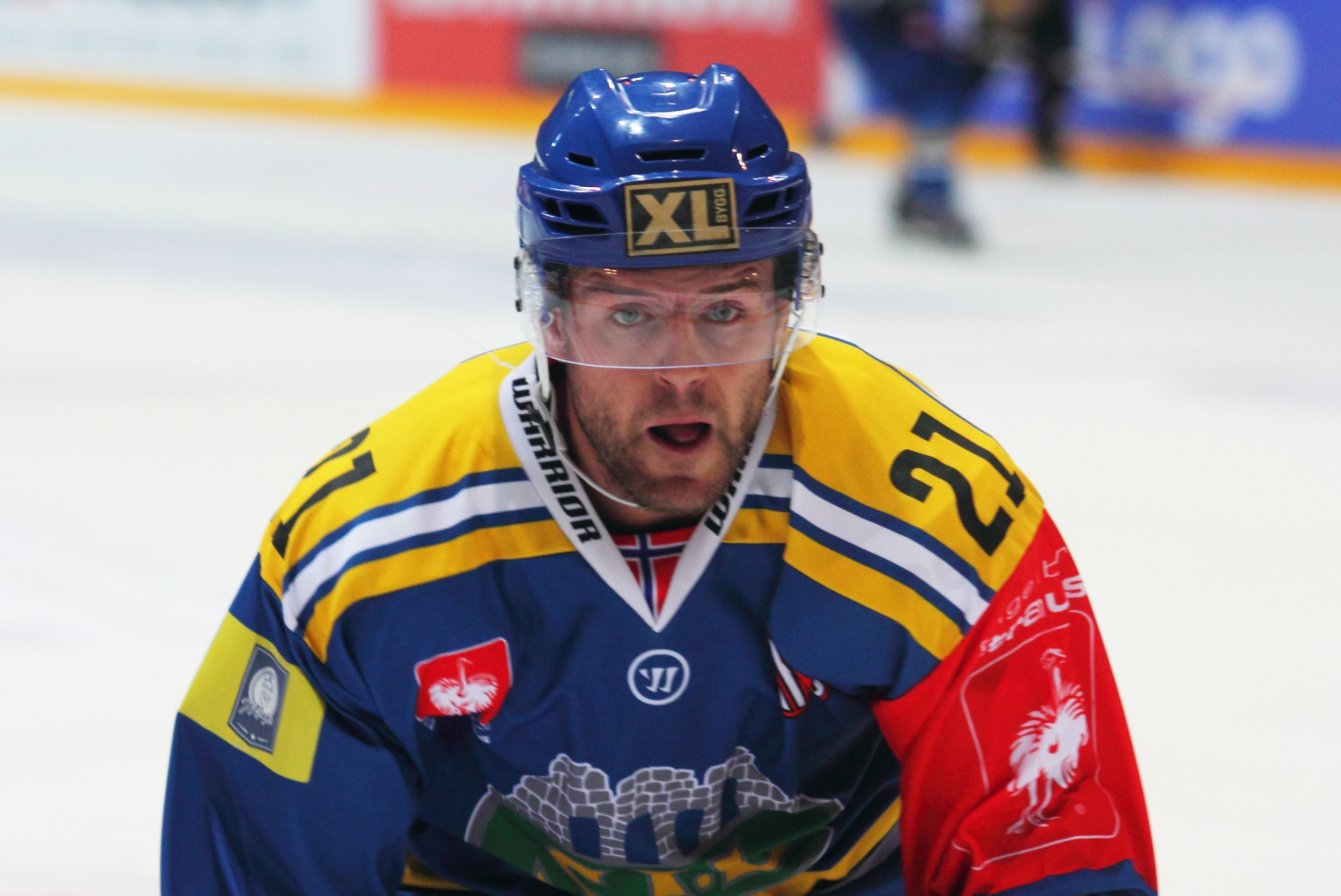
- Born: August 8, 1987 (age 38) Bærum, Norway
- Height: 6 ft 0 in (183 cm)
- Weight: 187 lb (85 kg; 13 st 5 lb)
- Position: Right winger
- Shot: Right
- Played for: Storhamar Dragons; Manglerud Star; Baie-Comeau Drakkar
- Playing career: 2003–2019

Joakim Jensen (born 8 August 1987) is a Norwegian former professional ice hockey player who spent most of his career with Storhamar of the Norwegian GET-ligaen.

Jensen is most well known for scoring the overtime game-winning goal against Sparta in the longest professional ice hockey game of all time, game 5 of the 2016–17 quarterfinals. The game lasted eight overtime periods (11 in total), with Jensen scoring at 2:30 in the morning, after 217 minutes of play.
