= Jonas Solberg Andersen =

Norwegian ice hockey player

- Born: 8 March 1981 (age 45) Sarpsborg, Norway
- Height: 6 ft 0 in (183 cm)
- Weight: 187 lb (85 kg; 13 st 5 lb)
- Position: Forward
- Shot: Right
- Played for: Sparta Warriors; Leksand
- National team: Norway
- Playing career: 1998–2013

Jonas Solberg Andersen (born March 8, 1981, in Sarpsborg, Norway) is a Norwegian former professional ice hockey player.

== Career statistics ==
=== Regular season and playoffs ===
			Regular season					Playoffs
Season	Team	League	GP	G	A	Pts	PIM	GP	G	A	Pts	PIM
1996–97	Sparta Warriors	NOR U19	—	—	—	—	—	—	—	—	—	—
1997–98	Sparta Warriors	NOR U19	—	—	—	—	—	—	—	—	—	—
1998–99	Sparta Warriors	NOR	3	0	0	0	0	—	—	—	—	—
1999–2000	Sparta Warriors	NOR	20	2	1	3	0	—	—	—	—	—
2000–01	Sparta Warriors	NOR	41	8	11	19	18	—	—	—	—	—
2001–02	Sparta Warriors	NOR	33	9	8	17	12	—	—	—	—	—
2002–03	Sparta Warriors	NOR	35	11	7	18	30	—	—	—	—	—
2003–04	Sparta Warriors	NOR	41	17	14	31	28	9	5	3	8	2
2004–05	Leksands IF	Allsv	27	5	1	6	22	—	—	—	—	—
2004–05	Sparta Warriors	NOR	16	3	4	7	6	4	0	0	0	0
2005–06	Sparta Warriors	NOR	42	23	21	44	70	6	4	2	6	2
2006–07	Sparta Warriors	NOR	41	38	40	78	40	13	5	5	10	16
2007–08	Sparta Warriors	NOR	39	12	19	31	64	6	4	0	4	4
2008–09	Sparta Warriors	NOR	42	18	37	55	30	—	—	—	—	—
2009–10	Sparta Warriors	NOR	46	29	37	66	26	12	7	8	15	8
2010–11	Sparta Warriors	NOR	45	25	33	58	8	14	4	7	11	4
2011–12	Sparta Warriors	NOR	32	11	16	27	18	7	0	3	3	2
2012–13	Sparta Warriors	NOR	30	5	17	22	6	—	—	—	—	—
NOR totals			506	211	265	476	356	71	29	28	57	38

=== International ===
Year	Team	Event	GP	G	A	Pts	PIM
1998	Norway	EJC	5	2	0	2	2
1999	Norway	WJC18	6	1	0	1	0
2000	Norway	WJC B	5	1	2	3	4
2004	Norway	WC D1	5	1	2	3	2
2005	Norway	OGQ	6	2	2	4	4
2006	Norway	WC	6	0	0	0	0
2007	Norway	WC	6	2	1	3	4
2010	Norway	OG	4	0	0	0	0
Junior totals			16	4	2	6	6
Senior totals			27	5	5	10	10
