= Eerikki Koivu =

Norwegian ice hockey player

- Born: 29 December 1979 (age 45); Kokkola, Finland
- Height: 6 ft 3 in (191 cm)
- Weight: 220 lb (100 kg; 15 st 10 lb)
- Position: Defence
- Shot: Left
- GET-ligaen team Former teams: Lørenskog; Storhamar Dragons; JYP; Ducs d'Angers
- National team: Norway
- NHL draft: Undrafted
- Playing career: 2000–2011

Eerikki Koivu (born 29 December 1979 in Kokkola, Finland) is a former professional ice hockey defenceman who last played for Lørenskog IK in Norway's GET-ligaen in the 2010-2011 season.

== Career ==
Until 2004, Koivu had played two seasons in Ligue Magnus and the rest of his career in Mestis, the second tier of Finnish hockey. In the 2004–05 season, he played his first five games in SM-liiga with JYP and continued in the team for 2005-06 and 2006–07 seasons. He moved to Norway in 2007 to play with Lørenskog IK.

Koivu acquired Norwegian citizenship in 2010. After playing four seasons in Norway, he received eligibility to play for the Norwegian national team, and he was selected to play at the 2011 IIHF World Championship. He ended his playing career after a serious hand injury in 2011.
