= Pål Johnsen =

Norwegian ice hockey player

- Born: March 17, 1976 (age 49) Hamar, Norway
- Height: 5 ft 11 in (180 cm)
- Weight: 176 lb (80 kg; 12 st 8 lb)
- Position: Center
- Shot: Left
- Played for: Storhamar Dragons; Leksands IF; Skellefteå AIK
- National team: Norway
- Playing career: 1992–2015

Pål "Magic" Johnsen (born March 17, 1976, in Hamar) is a retired Norwegian hockey player, who most of his career played for the Storhamar Dragons in the GET-ligaen (top league in Norway). Johnsen made his debut for the senior team as a 16-year-old in December, 1992 against Hasle/Løren. Since then was loyal to Storhamar except for two seasons in Sweden with Leksands IF and Skellefteå AIK 2000–02. Johnsen got 48 official games for the national team, and received the Golden Puck award as the Norwegian player of the year in 2000.
