= Ruben Smith =

Norwegian ice hockey player

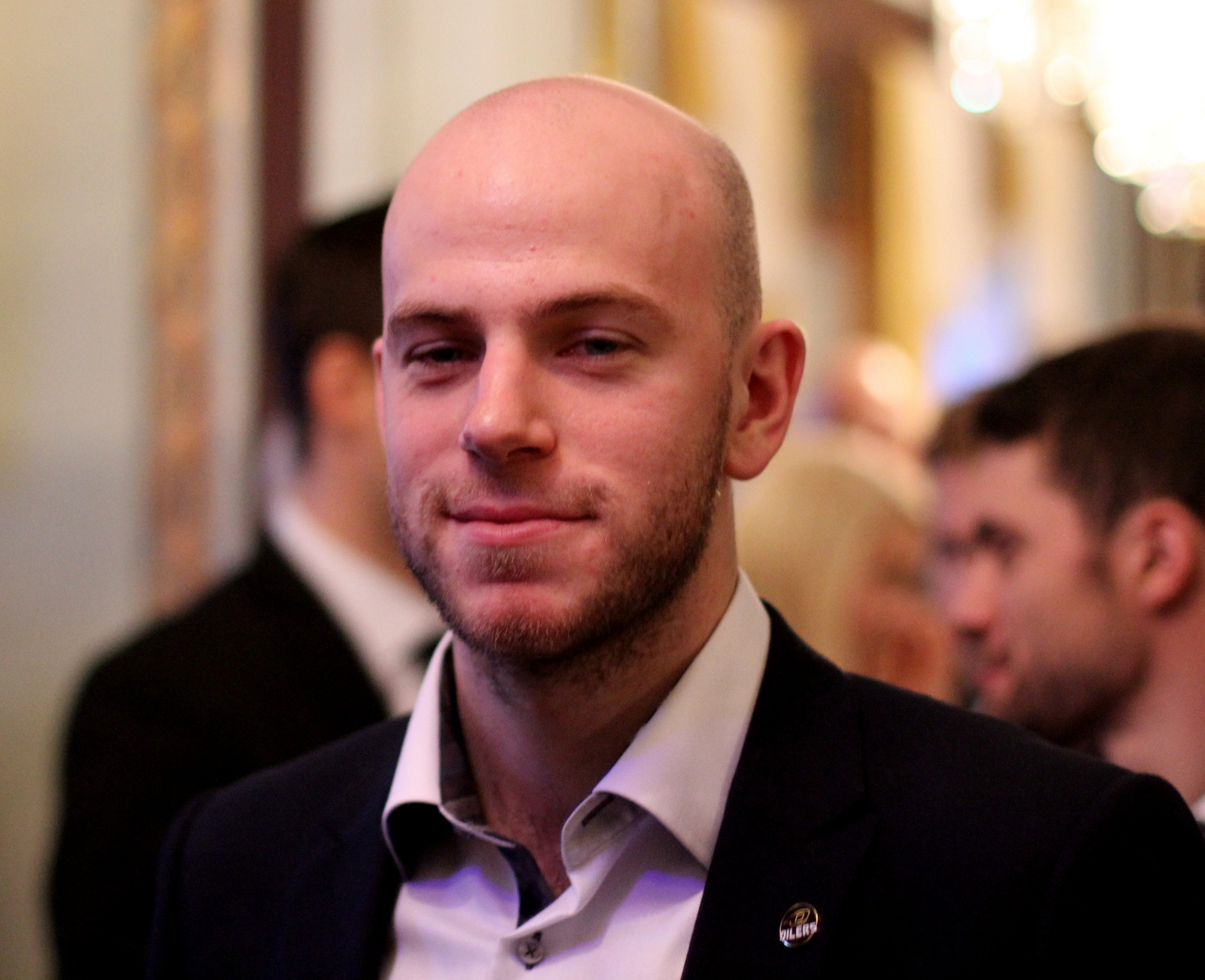
- Born: April 15, 1987 (age 38) Stavanger, Norway
- Height: 5 ft 11 in (180 cm)
- Weight: 165 lb (75 kg; 11 st 11 lb)
- Position: Goaltender
- Shot: Left
- Played for: Stavanger Oilers; Storhamar Dragons; Rosenborg IHK
- National team: Norway
- NHL draft: Undrafted
- Playing career: 2005–2017

Ruben Smith (born April 15, 1987) is a retired Norwegian professional ice hockey goaltender who last played for Stavanger Oilers in Norway's GET-ligaen. Up to the 2010/2011 season he played with the Storhamar Dragons of Norway's elite GET-ligaen. Smith joined the Storhamar organization in 2003 and played three seasons with their junior elite team. He made his professional debut during the 2005–06 season, appearing in 13 games and recording a goals against average of 0.50 and a save percentage of .973.

He backstopped the Dragons to the championship title in 2008, earning him the playoffs MVP trophy.

During the 2010 offseason he signed with the newly promoted Rosenborg of Trondheim.

== International career ==
Smith was selected to play for the Norway men's national ice hockey team at the 2010 Winter Olympics. He has previously represented Norway at the 2006 and 2007 World Junior Ice Hockey Championships, and the 2008, 2009 and 2010 World Ice Hockey Championships.

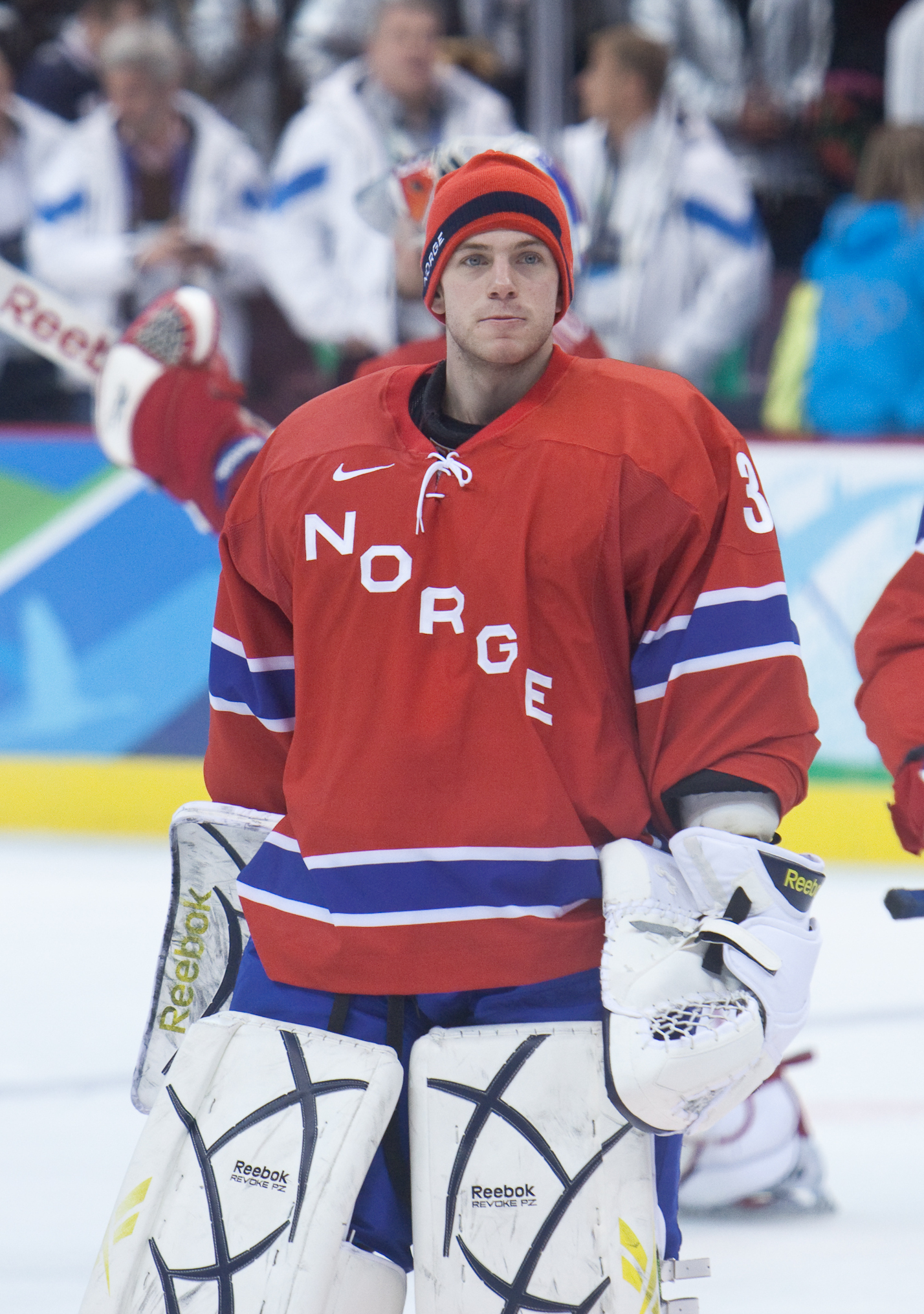
Smith with Norway at the 2010 Winter Olympics
