= Mattias Livf =

Norwegian ice hockey player

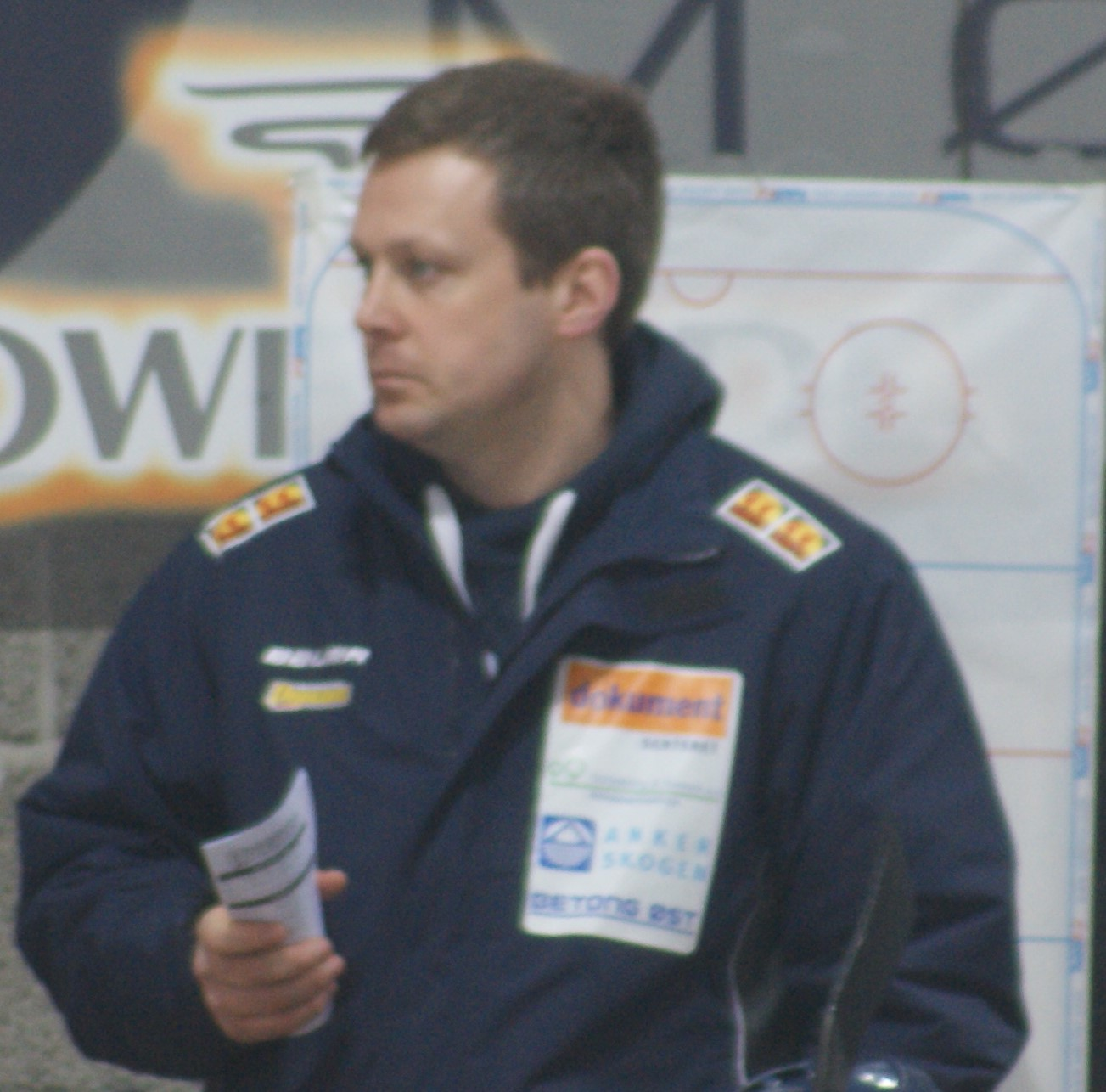
- Born: February 24, 1974 (age 51); Östervåla, Sweden
- Height: 6 ft 0 in (183 cm)
- Weight: 200 lb (91 kg; 14 st 4 lb)
- Position: Defence
- Shoots: Left
- GET-ligaen team Former teams: Storhamar Dragons; Östervåla; Arlanda; Trondheim
- Playing career: 1992–present

Mattias Livf, born February 24, 1974, is a Norwegian ice hockey player who plays for the Storhamar Dragons and was their current captain. Livf was born in Sweden but was granted a Norwegian citizenship in 2007 which also made him eligible for Norway's national team. He made his international debut at the IIHF World Championship in Moscow, Russia in 2007.

== Playing career ==
Livf signed with his current team prior to the 2001/02 season after he had spent one season with the Trondheim Black Panthers. He has now played eight seasons in Norway, the last seven with Storhamar. In March 2008 he signed a two-year contract extension with the Dragons. He has been the captain of the Dragons since 2006.

Preceded by Mads Hansen	Storhamar Dragons captains 2006–present	Incumbent
