= Tomi Pöllänen =

Finnish ice hockey player

- Born: 26 May 1978 (age 47) Joensuu, FIN
- Height: 5 ft 10 in (178 cm)
- Weight: 176 lb (80 kg; 12 st 8 lb)
- Position: Forward
- Shot: Left
- Played for: Ässät; Frisk Tigers; KalPa; Lillehammer
- Playing career: 1993–2014

Tomi Pöllänen (born 26 May 1978 in Joensuu) is a Finnish former professional ice hockey forward.

== Career ==
=== Early career ===
He started his career in 1993, playing for Jokipojat at junior level and was promoted to its Mestis-team in front of the 2000–01-season. The year after he got transferred to KooKoo in the same league, where he became the league's top scorer with 28 goals and made the All-Star team.

=== SM-liiga and Norway ===
In 2002, he joined Ässät in the SM-liiga for two seasons, before moving to Norway playing for Frisk Tigers in the 2004–05 season of GET-ligaen. He then moved back home to play for SM-liiga team KalPa in the 2005–06-season. After that he joined Jokipojat for 28 matches, following a brief spell at Sierre-Anniviers who played in the Swiss Nationalliga B.

Before the 2007–08 GET-ligaen season, Pöllanen made another trip to Norway, playing for GET-ligaen team Lillehammer, where he has played three seasons. In 2009–10, he was the player with the most points during the regular season.
