= 2010–11 GET-ligaen season =

- League: GET-ligaen
- Sport: Ice hockey
- Number of teams: 10
- TV partner(s): TV 2 Sport

GET-ligaen seasons
- ← 2009–10 season 2011–12 season →

The 2010–11 GET-ligaen is the 72nd season of Norway's premier ice hockey league, Eliteserien (known as GET-ligaen for sponsorship reasons). The regular season began on 18 September 2010 and is scheduled to end on 27 February 2011.

== Regular season ==
=== Final standings ===
	Team	GP	W	OTW	SOW	OTL	SOL	L	Pts	PCT	GF	GA	PIM	Home	Away
1	Sparta Warriors (C)	45	33	1	3	1	0	7	108	80	193	96	789	19-1-0-3	14-3-1-3
2	Stavanger Oilers	45	27	2	3	2	1	10	94	70	176	108	848	17-3-2-1	10-2-1-9
3	Vålerenga	45	25	3	2	1	4	10	90	67	140	94	637	14-2-3-4	11-3-2-6
4	Storhamar Dragons	45	24	4	1	4	3	9	89	66	139	98	596	16-3-2-1	8-2-5-8
5	Lillehammer	45	20	3	2	3	3	14	77	57	162	128	865	12-3-2-6	8-2-4-8
6	Lørenskog	45	18	2	1	1	2	21	57	42	145	133	627	11-2-1-9	7-1-2-12
7	Frisk Asker	45	11	1	3	2	1	27	44	33	117	174	846	8-2-3-9	3-2-0-18
8	Rosenborg	45	12	1	1	2	1	28	43	32	118	189	698	9-1-1-11	3-1-2-17
9	Manglerud Star	45	10	1	3	2	3	26	43	32	104	176	726	6-2-3-11	4-2-2-15
10	Stjernen	45	7	0	1	0	2	35	24	18	88	186	1,137	5-0-2-15	2-1-0-20

GP = Games played; W = Wins; L = Losses; OTW = Overtime Wins; OTL = Overtime losses; SOW = Shootout Wins; SOL = Shootout losses; PCT = Percent of possible points; GF = Goals for; GA = Goals against; PIM = Penalties in minutes; Pts = Points; C = Champions
Source: pointstreak.com

=== Statistics ===
==== Scoring leaders ====
These are the top ten skaters based on points. If the list exceeds ten skaters because of a tie in points, all of the tied skaters are shown.

Player	Team	GP	G	A	Pts	+/–	PIM
(Sweden) Martin Strandfeldt	Stavanger Oilers	45	37	28	65	+27	48
(Sweden) Henrik Malmström	Sparta Warriors	44	24	41	65	+23	24
(Norway) Christian Dahl Andersen	Stavanger Oilers	45	23	42	65	+26	10
(United States) Gino Guyer	Lillehammer	45	22	40	62	+20	8
(Norway) Jonas Solberg Andersen	Sparta Warriors	45	25	33	58	+26	8
(United States) Justin Bostrom	Lillehammer	45	21	36	57	+25	28
(Canada) Dion Knelsen	Sparta Warriors	45	24	32	56	+30	14
(Finland) Juha-Pekka Loikas	Stavanger Oilers	45	22	32	54	+21	79
(Finland) Tomi Pöllänen	Frisk Asker	40	19	32	51	-1	48
(Canada) Christian Larrivée	Storhamar Dragons	42	15	30	45	+14	32
(Norway) Petter Witnes	Sparta Warriors	41	13	32	45	+22	39
(Norway) Pål Johnsen	Storhamar Dragons	44	11	34	45	+10	22
(Norway) Knut Henrik Spets	Lørenskog	45	10	35	45	+3	20

GP = Games played; G = Goals; A = Assists; Pts = Points; +/– = Plus–minus; PIM = Penalty minutes

==== Leading goaltenders ====
These are the top five goaltenders based on goals against average.

Player	Team	GP	TOI	W	L	GA	SO	Sv%	GAA
(Canada) Patrick DesRochers	Vålerenga	45	2,733	30	15	88	6	92.2	1.93
(Canada) Trevor Koenig	Storhamar Dragons	40	2,407	25	15	78	6	93.3	1.94
(United States) Phil Osaer	Sparta Warriors	42	2,533	35	7	85	6	93.0	2.01
(Finland) Antti Ore	Stavanger Oilers	42	2,490	29	13	98	5	91.8	2.36
(Canada) Jonathan Boutin	Lillehammer	41	2,397	23	17	99	1	91.4	2.48

GP = Games played; TOI = Time on ice (minutes); W = Wins; L = Losses; GA = Goals against; SO = Shutouts; Sv% = Save percentage; GAA = Goals against average

=== Attendance ===
Team	Arena	Capacity	Total	Games	Average	% of Capacity
Storhamar Dragons	Hamar OL-Amfi	6,091	52,405	22	2,382	39.1%
Vålerenga	Jordal Amfi	4,450	35,674	23	1,551	34.9%
Sparta Warriors	Sparta Amfi	3,450	60,765	23	2,641	76.6%
Lillehammer	Kristins Hall	3,194	35,214	23	1,531	47.9%
Rosenborg	Leangen Ishall	3,000	28,376	22	1,289	43.0%
Stavanger Oilers	Siddishallen	2,664	42,013	23	1,826	68.5%
Stjernen	Stjernehallen	2,473	23,646	22	1,074	43.4%
Frisk Asker	Askerhallen	2,400	22,302	22	1,013	42.2%
Manglerud Star	Manglerudhallen	2,000	6,686	22	303	15.2%
Lørenskog	Lørenskog Ishall	1,350	21,492	23	934	69.2%

Total	Games	Average
328,573	225	1,460

Source: pointstreak.com

== Playoffs ==
After the regular season, the standard of eight teams qualified for the playoffs. In the first and second rounds, the highest remaining seed chooses which of the two lowest remaining seeds to be matched against. In each round the higher-seeded team is awarded home ice advantage. Each best-of-seven series follows a 1–1–1–1–1–1–1 format: the higher-seeded team plays at home for games 1 and 3 (plus 5 and 7 if necessary), and the lower-seeded team at home for games 2, 4 and 6 (if necessary).

=== Bracket ===
Quarter-finals
1	Sparta Warriors	4
8	Rosenborg	0
2	Stavanger Oilers	4
7	Frisk Asker	1
(Pairings are reseeded after the first round)
3	Vålerenga	1
6	Lørenskog	4
4	Storhamar Dragons	1
5	Lillehammer	4

Semi-finals
1	Sparta Warriors	4
5	Lillehammer	1
2	Stavanger Oilers	4
6	Lørenskog	2

Finals
1	Sparta Warriors	4
2	Stavanger Oilers	1

Source: pointstreak.com

Norwegian Champions
2011
Sparta Warriors
3rd title

=== Game log ===
2011 Norwegian Ice Hockey Championship Game Log
Quarter-finals

(1) Sparta Warriors vs. (8) Rosenborg

2 March 2011; 19:00 CET	Sparta Warriors	8 – 0 (1–0, 5–0, 2–0)	Rosenborg	Sparta Amfi, Sarpsborg; Attendance: 1,909

Game reference

Phil Osaer
Goalies
Andreas Mundal Micka (out 41:33)
Andrey Dokoutchaev (in 41:33)
Referee:
Hans Petter Berg

Selvaag (Roest) - 7:12	1 – 0
Knelsen (Elofsson, Gøran Hermansson) - 24:51	2 – 0
Kristiansen (Knelsen, Robinson) - 26:33	3 – 0
Dahlstrøm (Elofsson, Malmström) (PP) - 34:29	4 – 0
Hermansson (Tengvert, Bøe) - 38:34	5 – 0
Solberg Andersen (Roest, Malmström) - 39:39	6 – 0
Robinson (Knelsen, Roest) (SH) - 41:33	7 – 0
Roest (Malmström, Solberg Andersen) - 58:43	8 – 0

14 min
Penalties
12 min
43
Shots
20

4 March 2011; 18:30 CET	Rosenborg	3 – 5 (0–0, 2–4, 1–1)	Sparta Warriors	Leangen Ishall, Trondheim; Attendance: 1,629

Game reference

Andreas Mundal Micka
Goalies
Phil Osaer
Referee:
Lasse Westby

	0 – 1	20:20 - Knelsen (Roest)
	0 – 2	30:37 - Dahlstrøm (Malmström, Magnus Selvaag)
	0 – 3	30:59 - Malmström (Solberg Andersen, Henriksen)
Beauregard (Dubkov, Wehn) (PP) - 33:07	1 – 3
Erbe (Fairbarn, Reiss-Jacobsen) - 33:23	2 – 3
	2 – 4	36:12 - Malmström (Solberg Andersen, Skaarberg)
Nielsen (Vock, Fairbarn) - 42:29	3 – 4
	3 – 5	50:13 - Roest (Knelsen, Fata) (SH)

20 min
Penalties
22 min
23
Shots
40

6 March 2011; 19:30 CET	Sparta Warriors	6 – 0 (3–0, 2–0, 1–0)	Rosenborg	Sparta Amfi, Sarpsborg; Attendance: 2,055

Game reference

Phil Osaer
Goalies
Andrey Dokoutchaev
Referee:
Eirik Hansen

Dahlstrøm (Selvaag, Bovim) - 2:19	1 – 0
Robinson (Malmström) - 8:27	2 – 0
Bøe (Robinson, Løvlie) - 13:14	3 – 0
Dahlstrøm (Busque, Selvaag) - 21:37	4 – 0
Knelsen (Kristiansen, Witnes) - 29:30	5 – 0
Bøe (Witnes) - 53:53	6 – 0

12 min
Penalties
12 min
33
Shots
26

8 March 2011; 18:30 CET	Rosenborg	0 – 4 (0–1, 0–2, 0–1)	Sparta Warriors	Leangen Ishall, Trondheim; Attendance: 1,329

Game reference

Andreas Mundal Micka
Goalies
Phil Osaer
Referee:
Lasse Westby

0 – 1	3:53 - Malmström (Solberg Andersen, Fata)
0 – 2	21:54 - Knelsen (Witnes, Kristiansen)
0 – 3	23:09 - Malmström (Selvaag, Henriksen) (PP)
0 – 4	50:02 - Malmström (Bøe, Niklas Roest)

12 min
Penalties
10 min
17
Shots
45

Sparta won series 4–0

(2) Stavanger Oilers vs. (7) Frisk Asker

2 March 2011; 19:00 CET	Stavanger Oilers	2 – 1 (1–0, 0–1, 1–0)	Frisk Asker	Siddishallen, Stavanger; Attendance: 1,540

Game reference

Antti Ore
Goalies
Gusten Törnqvist
Referee:
Per Gustav Solem

Trygg (Sundin, Strandfeldt) - 4:27	1 – 0
	1 – 1	30:11 - Dokken (Stensund)
Strandfeldt (Solberg, Kinley) (PP) - 50:54	2 – 1

8 min
Penalties
12 min
48
Shots
25

4 March 2011; 19:00 CET	Frisk Asker	6 – 2 (2–0, 1–1, 3–1)	Stavanger Oilers	Askerhallen, Asker; Attendance: 951

Game reference

Gusten Törnqvist
Goalies
Antti Ore
Referee:
Petter Hegle

Vuorisalo (Pöllänen, Andersson - 0:31	1 – 0
Dokken (Vuorisalo, Pöllänen) (PP) - 18:40	2 – 0
	2 – 1	24:42 - Lorentzen (Kaunismäki, Nagel)
Andersson (Flaten, Bitustøyl) - 29:43	3 – 1
Fontanive (Vuorisalo, Pöllänen) (PP2) - 44:13	4 – 1
Stensund (Rålm, Dokken) - 46:03	5 – 1
Corbet (Dokken, Vuorisalo) (PP) - 50:58	6 – 1
	6 – 2	52:27 - Lotila (Loikas, Brandasu)

16 min
Penalties
14 min
29
Shots
36

6 March 2011; 17:00 CET	Stavanger Oilers	6 – 1 (0–0, 5–0, 1–1)	Frisk Asker	Siddishallen, Stavanger; Attendance: 1,406

Game reference

Antti Ore
Goalies
Gusten Törnqvist
Referee:
Per Gustav Solem

David (Kinley, Trygg) - 21:49	1 – 0
Vannelli (Sundin, Sveum) (PP) - 2:45	2 – 0
Lorentzen - 25:13	3 – 0
Lorentzen (Loikas, Ore) - 34:53	4 – 0
Dahl Andersen (David, Hallem) - 38:37	5 – 0
Dahl Andersen (Strandfeldt, Lorentzen) - 49:41	6 – 0
	6 – 1	57:41 - Myrvold (Bitustøyl, Flaten)

32 min
Penalties
32 min
35
Shots
21

8 March 2011; 19:00 CET	Frisk Asker	4 – 8 (2–3, 2–3, 0–2)	Stavanger Oilers	Askerhallen, Asker; Attendance: 1,192

Game reference

Gusten Törnqvist
Goalies
Antti Ore
Referee:
Petter Hegle

	0 – 1	2:48 - Loikas (Dahl Andersen, Kinley) (PP)
Corbet (Andersson, Vuorisalo) (PP) - 3:14	1 – 1
Pöllänen (Corbet) (PP) - 8:40	2 – 1
	2 – 2	11:45 - Vannelli (Sveum, Loikas) (PP)
	2 – 3	13:49 - David (Strandfeldt, Dahl Andersen)
	2 – 4	32:26 - Lorentzen (Lotila)
Dokken (Follestad Johansen, Corbet) - 32:51	3 – 4
	3 – 5	34:23 - Lorentzen (Kinley)
	3 – 6	36:47 - Strandfeldt (Kinley) (PP)
Vuorisalo (Pöllänen, Corbet) (PP) - 38:43	4 – 6
	4 – 7	45:15 - Kinley (David, Trygg)
	4 – 8	49:47 - Sundin (Solberg)

16 min
Penalties
22 min
26
Shots
25

10 March 2011; 19:00 CET	Stavanger Oilers	5 – 2 (1–0, 3–1, 1–1)	Frisk Asker	Siddishallen, Stavanger; Attendance: 1,610

Game reference

Antti Ore
Goalies
Gusten Törnqvist
Referee:
Hans Petter Berg

Dahl Andersen (Strandfeldt, Loikas - 16:50	1 – 0
Loikas (Dahl Andersen, Vannelli (PP2) - 24:39	2 – 0
Sundin (David, Vannelli) (PP2) - 26:21	3 – 0
Loikas (Dahl Andersen, Kinley) - 32:06	4 – 0
	4 – 1	34:11 - Kristiansen (Follestad Johansen, Pöllänen)
	4 – 2	41:56 - Nystrøm (Follestad Johansen)
Strandfeldt (Loikas, Dahl Andersen) - 54:55	5 – 2

8 min
Penalties
8 min
41
Shots
32

Stavanger won series 4–1

(3) Vålerenga vs. (6) Lørenskog

2 March 2011; 19:00 CET	Vålerenga	4 – 3 (2OT) (1–0, 0–3, 2–0, 0–0, 1–0)	Lørenskog	Jordal Amfi, Oslo; Attendance: 1,526

Game reference

Patrick DesRochers
Goalies
Jordan Parise
Referee:
Tommy Søstumoen

Thoresen (Oppøyen, Lund) (PP) - 12:28	1 – 0
	1 – 1	24:49 - K.H. Spets (L.E. Spets, Delmore) (PP)
	1 – 2	28:07 - Jordhøy (Fredriksen, K.H. Spets)
	1 – 3	30:30 - Jakobsen (L.E. Spets, Nylander)
Payer (Cocozza, Oppøyen) - 44:44	2 – 3
Roselli Olsen (Ask) (SH) - 47:24	3 – 3
Lund (Evans) - 84:23	4 – 3

14 min
Penalties
16 min
39
Shots
29

4 March 2011; 19:00 CET	Lørenskog	3 – 1 (0–0, 3–0, 0–1)	Vålerenga	Lørenskog Ishall, Lørenskog; Attendance: 920

Game reference

Jordan Parise
Goalies
Patrick DesRochers
Referee:
Ole Stian Hansen

Lindström (K.H. Spets, Jordhøy) - 28:19	1 – 0
Thygesen (Linström, Trudel) - 28:58	2 – 0
Trudel (Larsen) - 37:26	3 – 0
	3 – 1	44:13 - Oppøyen

20 min
Penalties
31 min
22
Shots
29

6 March 2011; 17:00 CET	Vålerenga	1 – 2 (OT) (1–0, 0–1, 0–0, 0–1)	Lørenskog	Jordal Amfi, Oslo; Attendance: 1,668

Game reference

Patrick DesRochers
Goalies
Jordan Parise
Referee:
Tommy Søstumoen

Evans (Trygg, Payer) (PP) - 1:40	1 – 0
	1 – 1	30:22 - Fredriksen (Nylander, L.E. Spets) (PP)
	1 – 2	68:01 - Lindström (SH)

14 min
Penalties
14 min
36
Shots
29

8 March 2011; 19:00 CET	Lørenskog	5 – 1 (0–0, 5–1, 0–0)	Vålerenga	Lørenskog Ishall, Lørenskog; Attendance: 1,250

Game reference

Jordan Parise
Goalies
Patrick DesRochers
Referee:
Ole Stian Hansen

	0 – 1	20:57 - Lund (Roselli Olsen) (PP)
Jordhøy (K.H. Spets, Fredriksen) - 22:25	1 – 1
Kuusisto (Larsen, Thygesen) (PP) - 26:03	2 – 1
L.E. Spets (Nylander, K.H. Spets) (PP) - 27:34	3 – 1
Delmore (Fredriksen, K.H. Spets) (PP2) - 34:05	4 – 1
Thygesen (Lindström, Kuusisto) - 36:04	5 – 1

20 min
Penalties
73 min
33
Shots
27

10 March 2011; 19:00 CET	Vålerenga	2 – 5 (2–1, 0–2, 0–2)	Lørenskog	Jordal Amfi, Oslo; Attendance: 1,752

Game reference

Patrick DesRochers
Goalies
Jordan Parise
Referee:
Ole Stian Hansen

Trygg (Ask, Lund) (PP2) - 6:03	1 – 0
Cocozza (Ask, Lund) - 8:04	2 – 0
	2 – 1	15:08 - Frøshaug (Bruun, L.E. Spets)
	2 – 2	20:43 - Kuusisto (Olsson, Thygesen)
	2 – 3	39:07 - Fredriksen (Jakobsen, Delmore) (PP2)
	2 – 4	40:22 - L.E. Spets
	2 – 5	58:23 - Lindström (L.E. Spets) (SH) (EN)

8 min
Penalties
10 min
26
Shots
23

Lørenskog won series 4–1

(4) Storhamar Dragons vs. (5) Lillehammer

2 March 2011; 18:30 CET	Storhamar Dragons	9 – 1 (3–0, 3–0, 3–1)	Lillehammer	Hamar OL-Amfi, Hamar; Attendance: 2,872

Game reference

Trevor Koenig
Goalies
Jonathan Boutin (out 36:16)
Fredrik Johansson (in 36:16)
Referee:
Owe Lüthcke

Larrivée (Andersson, Grøndahl) (PP) - 10:42	1 – 0
Mostue (Larrivée, Grøndahl) (PP) - 14:26	2 – 0
Jensen (Skadsdammen, Ramstedt) (PP) - 18:16	3 – 0
Ramstedt (Grøndahl, Saxrud Danielsen) - 26:15	4 – 0
Larrivée (Ramstedt, Øksnes) - 36:02	5 – 0
Huse (Hesbråten, Lystad Jacobsen) - 36:17	6 – 0
Grøndahl (Ramstedt, Koenig) - 41:07	7 – 0
	7 – 1	49:46 - Spets (Cheverie)
Hesbråten (Johnsen) (PP2) - 54:21	8 – 1
Grøndahl (Larrivée) (PP) - 56:44	9 – 1

10 min
Penalties
32 min
49
Shots
25

4 March 2011; 18:30 CET	Lillehammer	2 – 1 (OT) (1–0, 0–1, 0–0, 1–0)	Storhamar Dragons	Kristins Hall, Lillehammer; Attendance: 1,882

Game reference

Jonathan Boutin
Goalies
Trevor Koenig
Referee:
Tor Olav Johnsen

Guyer (Bostrom, Høygård) - 7:04	1 – 0
	1 – 1	33:40 - Løkken Østli (Larrivée, Grøndahl) (PP)
Swanson (Bostrom, Reichenberg) - 78:30	2 – 1

18 min
Penalties
10 min
37
Shots
42

6 March 2011; 17:00 CET	Storhamar Dragons	2 – 5 (2–2, 0–2, 0–1)	Lillehammer	Hamar OL-Amfi, Hamar; Attendance: 2,745

Game reference

Trevor Koenig
Goalies
Jonathan Boutin
Referee:
Owe Lüthcke

	0 – 1	9:35 - Bostrom (Cheverie, Swanson) (PP)
Grøndahl (Larrivée, Ramstedt) - 13:04	1 – 1
Larrivée (Grøndahl, Hesbråten) - 16:56	2 – 1
	2 – 2	17:52 - Bakken (Cheverie, Reichenberg)
	2 – 3	26:45 - Cheverie (Eidsæther, Bakken) (SH)
	2 – 4	36:30 - Bäärnhielm (Eidsæther, Cheverie) (SH)
	2 – 5	59:58 - Guyer (Høygård) (EN)

12 min
Penalties
24 min
25
Shots
24

8 March 2011; 18:30 CET	Lillehammer	6 – 1 (2–1, 4–0, 0–0)	Storhamar Dragons	Kristins Hall, Lillehammer; Attendance: 2,205

Game reference

Jonathan Boutin
Goalies
Trevor Koenig (out 36:03)
Robert Hestmann (in 36:03)
Referee:
Tor Olav Johnsen

Eidsæther (Hotham, Cheverie) - 6:26	1 – 0
Bostrom (Cheverie, Hotham) (PP) - 8:11	2 – 0
	2 – 1	10:49 - Grøndahl (Hjelm, Larrivée) (PP)
Bäärnhielm (Hotham, Bostrom) (PP2) - 30:15	3 – 1
Guyer (SH) - 34:02	4 – 1
Bostrom (Hotham, Guyer) (PP) - 36:03	5 – 1
Saxrud (Reichenberg, Cheverie) - 39:59	6 – 1

18 min
Penalties
10 min
24
Shots
35

10 March 2011; 18:30 CET	Storhamar Dragons	1 – 3 (0–1, 1–1, 0–1)	Lillehammer	Hamar OL-Amfi, Hamar; Attendance: 2,235

Game reference

Trevor Koenig
Goalies
Jonathan Boutin
Referee:
Owe Lüthcke

	0 – 1	3:20 - Cheverie (Bäärnhielm, Guyer)
Grøndahl (Hjelm, Larrivée) (PP) - 30:16	1 – 1
	1 – 2	33:14 - Guyer (Bostrom, Høygård)
	1 – 3	57:02 - Guyer (Reichenberg)

6 min
Penalties
8 min
37
Shots
21

Lillehammer won series 4–1

Semi-finals

(1) Sparta Warriors vs. (5) Lillehammer

16 March 2011; 19:00 CET	Sparta Warriors	3 – 1 (0–0, 2–0, 1–1)	Lillehammer	Sparta Amfi, Sarpsborg; Attendance: 2,333

Game reference

Phil Osaer
Goalies
Jonathan Boutin
Referee:
Tor Olav Johnsen

Løvlie (Dahlstrøm, Bowim) - 22:15	1 – 0
Solberg Andersen (Malmström) - 29:35	2 – 0
	2 – 1	57:22 - Cheverie (Martinsen) (PP)
Kristiansen (Robinson) (EN) - 59:35	3 – 1

12 min
Penalties
14 min
29
Shots
31

18 March 2011; 19:00 CET	Lillehammer	5 – 1 (2–0, 2–0, 1–1)	Sparta Warriors	Kristins Hall, Lillehammer; Attendance: 1,842

Game reference

Jonathan Boutin
Goalies
Phil Osaer
Referee:
Owe Lüthcke

Reichenberg (Hotham, Cheverie) - 0:54	1 – 0
Martinsen (Guyer) (SH) - 6:25	2 – 0
Reichenberg (Martinsen, Saxrud) - 22:07	3 – 0
Høygård (Bostrom, Rindal) - 37:42	4 – 0
	4 – 1	40:58 - Kristiansen (Witnes)
Swanson (Martinsen) - 53:32	5 – 1

28 min
Penalties
26 min
26
Shots
35

20 March 2011; 17:00 CET	Sparta Warriors	4 – 2 (1–1, 1–1, 2–0)	Lillehammer	Sparta Amfi, Sarpsborg; Attendance: 2,579

Game reference

Phil Osaer
Goalies
Jonathan Boutin
Referee:
Tor Olav Johnsen

	0 – 1	7:07 - Bakken (Bäärnhielm, Saxrud) (PP)
Robinson (Selvaag) - 17:38	1 – 1
Dahlstrøm (Malmström, Selvaag) - 32:35	2 – 1
	2 – 2	39:06 - Bostrom (Hotham)
Løvlie (Kristiansen, Robinson) - 45:08	3 – 2
Bøe (Elofsson, Selvaag) (EN) - 58:10	4 – 2

41 min
Penalties
22 min
36
Shots
29

22 March 2011; 18:30 CET	Lillehammer	1 – 2 (0–2, 0–0, 1–0)	Sparta Warriors	Kristins Hall, Lillehammer; Attendance: 1,838

Game reference

Jonathan Boutin
Goalies
Phil Osaer
Referee:
Owe Lüthcke

	0 – 1	6:54 - Malmström (Kristiansen, Selvaag (PP)
	0 – 2	14:16 - Malmström (Solberg Andersen, Elofsson) (PP2)
Guyer (Swanson, Cheverie) - 58:50	1 – 2

14 min
Penalties
26 min
26
Shots
24

24 March 2011; 19:00 CET	Sparta Warriors	3 – 0 (1–0, 1–0, 1–0)	Lillehammer	Sparta Amfi, Sarpsborg; Attendance: 2,611

Game reference

Phil Osaer
Goalies
Jonathan Boutin
Referee:
Tor Olav Johnsen

Knelsen (Selvaag, Henriksen) - 4:30	1 – 0
Solberg Andersen (Elofsson, Malmström) (PP) - 36:37	2 – 0
Dahlstrøm (Selvaag, Henriksen) - 41:43	3 – 0

2 min
Penalties
24 min
35
Shots
16

Sparta won series 4–1

(2) Stavanger Oilers vs. (6) Lørenskog

16 March 2011; 19:00 CET	Stavanger Oilers	2 – 1 (0–0, 1–0, 1–1)	Lørenskog	Siddishallen, Stavanger; Attendance: 1,691

Game reference

Antti Ore
Goalies
Jordan Parise
Referee:
Ole Stian Hansen

Trygg - 35:23	1 – 0
Lotila (Hallem, Lorentzen) - 54:54	2 – 0
	2 – 1	58:47 - L.E. Spets (Jakobsen, Nylander)

4 min
Penalties
6 min
30
Shots
30

18 March 2011; 19:00 CET	Lørenskog	4 – 3 (OT) (1–0, 1–0, 1–3, 1–0)	Stavanger Oilers	Lørenskog Ishall, Lørenskog; Attendance: 980

Game reference

Jordan Parise
Goalies
Antti Ore
Referee:
Per Gustav Solem

Nylander (L.E. Spets, Frøshaug) - 12:35	1 – 0
Fredriksen (Delmore, Jakobsen) (PP2) - 30:26	2 – 0
	2 – 1	41:41 - Grafsrønningen (Vannelli, Virtala) (PP)
Fredriksen (K.H. Spets, Delmore) - 50:23	3 – 1
	3 – 2	52:41 - Solberg (Kinley, Loikas)
	3 – 3	58:13 - Nagel (Vannelli)
Lindström (Kuusisto) (PP) - 66:38	4 – 3

10 min
Penalties
18 min
40
Shots
35

20 March 2011; 17:00 CET	Stavanger Oilers	2 – 3 (0–0, 2–1, 0–2)	Lørenskog	Siddishallen, Stavanger; Attendance: 1,823

Game reference

Antti Ore
Goalies
Jordan Parise
Referee:
Ole Stian Hansen

Trygg (David, Nagel) - 31:25	1 – 0
Loikas (Dahl Andersen, Strandfeldt) - 35:35	2 – 0
	2 – 1	36:50 - Thygesen (Lindström, Kuusisto)
	2 – 2	45:03 - Jakobsen (L.E. Spets, Nylander)
	2 – 3	55:09 - Nylander (L.E. Spets, Frøshaug)

28 min
Penalties
22 min
30
Shots
12

22 March 2011; 19:00 CET	Lørenskog	2 – 5 (0–2, 0–3, 2–0)	Stavanger Oilers	Lørenskog Ishall, Lørenskog; Attendance: 1,620

Game reference

Jordan Parise
Goalies
Antti Ore
Referee:
Ole Stian Hansen

	0 – 1	9:39 - Loikas (Strandfeldt, Dahl Andersen)
	0 – 2	17:37 - Lotila (Hallem, Kinley)
	0 – 3	20:46 - Strandfeldt (Vannelli, Hallem)
	0 – 4	21:47 - Loikas (Dahl Andersen, Kinley) (PP)
	0 – 5	22:34 - Virtala (Lotila, Vannelli)
Kuusisto (Larsen, Delmore) - 44:22	1 – 5
K.H. Spets (Fredriksen, Delmore) (PP2) - 58:39	2 – 5

16 min
Penalties
32 min
27
Shots
27

24 March 2011; 19:00 CET	Stavanger Oilers	7 – 0 (3–0, 3–0, 1–0)	Lørenskog	Siddishallen, Stavanger; Attendance: 1,786

Game reference

Antti Ore
Goalies
Jordan Parise
Referee:
Per Gustav Solem

Grafsrønningen (Virtala, Trygg) (PP) - 3:16	1 – 0
Hallem (David, Dahl Andersen) - 14:48	2 – 0
Trygg (Vannelli, Loikas) - 19:27	3 – 0
Dahl Andersen (Strandfeldt, Loikas) - 22:43	4 – 0
Strandfeldt (Loikas, Solberg) (PP) - 29:04	5 – 0
Virtala (Trygg, Strandfeldt) (PP) - 34:31	6 – 0
Åsland (Boxill, Brandasu) - 58:12	7 – 0

49 min
Penalties
62 min
36
Shots
30

26 March 2011; 16:00 CET	Lørenskog	2 – 3 (OT) (1–0, 0–2, 1–0, 0–1)	Stavanger Oilers	Lørenskog Ishall, Lørenskog; Attendance: 920

Game reference

Jordan Parise
Goalies
Antti Ore
Referee:
Ole Stian Hansen

L.E. Spets (Frøshaug) - 5:16	1 – 0
	1 – 1	22:01 - Trygg (Kinley)
	1 – 2	37:07 - Vannelli (Solberg, Nagel) (SH)
Kuusisto (Thygesen, Lindström) - 49:23	2 – 2
	2 – 3	70:42 - Trygg

8 min
Penalties
20 min
27
Shots
27

Stavanger won series 4–2

Finals

(1) Sparta Warriors vs. (2) Stavanger Oilers

31 March 2011; 19:00 CET	Sparta Warriors	6 – 1 (4–0, 2–0, 0–1)	Stavanger Oilers	Sparta Amfi, Sarpsborg; Attendance: 3,003

Game reference

Phil Osaer
Goalies
Antti Ore (out 40:00)
Ruben Smith (in 40:00)
Referee:
Owe Lüthcke

Malmström (Elofsson, Solberg Andersen) (PP2) - 10:42	1 – 0
Kristiansen (Malmström) - 15:23	2 – 0
Henriksen (Dahlstrøm, Løvlie) - 16:15	3 – 0
Roest (Malmström, Tengvert) - 19:33	4 – 0
Selvaag (Knelsen, Elofsson) (PP) - 30:39	5 – 0
Solberg Andersen (Malmtröm, Elofsson) - 38:06	6 – 0
	6 – 1	52:03 - Hallem (Vannelli, Grafsrønningen)

20 min
Penalties
34 min
30
Shots
26

3 April 2011; 17:00 CET	Stavanger Oilers	5 – 0 (1–0, 1–0, 3–0)	Sparta Warriors	Siddishallen, Stavanger; Attendance: 2,146

Game reference

Antti Ore
Goalies
Phil Osaer
Referee:
Tor Olav Johnsen

Kinley (Grafsrønningen, Dahl Andersen) (PP2) - 6:58	1 – 0
Dahl Andersen (Vannelli, Strandfeldt) (PP) - 23:08	2 – 0
Strandfeldt (Dahl Andersen, Kinley) (PP) - 49:50	3 – 0
Strandfeldt (Loikas, Dahl Andersen) - 51:37	4 – 0
Lorentzen (Kaunismäki, Nagel) (SH) (EN) - 59:50	5 – 0

12 min
Penalties
30 min
28
Shots
18

5 April 2011; 19:00 CET	Sparta Warriors	3 – 1 (1–0, 0–1, 2–0)	Stavanger Oilers	Sparta Amfi, Sarpsborg; Attendance: 3,122

Game reference

Phil Osaer
Goalies
Antti Ore
Referee:
Ole Stian Hansen

Kristiansen (Robinson, Solberg Andersen) (PP2) - 11:05	1 – 0
	1 – 1	30:13 - Solberg (Kinley, Dahl Andersen) (PP)
Kristiansen (Witnes, Løvlie) - 51:52	2 – 1
Kristiansen (Løvlie, Witnes) - 53:40	3 – 1

40 min
Penalties
54 min
31
Shots
26

7 April 2011; 19:00 CET	Stavanger Oilers	0 – 3 (0–0, 0–1, 0–2)	Sparta Warriors	Siddishallen, Stavanger; Attendance: 2,248

Game reference

Antti Ore
Goalies
Phil Osaer
Referee:
Tor Olav Johnsen

0 – 1	21:30 - Malmström (Knelsen, Elofsson) (PP)
0 – 2	47:35 - Knelsen (Elofsson, Malmström) (PP)
0 – 3	58:26 - Knelsen (Kristiansen, Robinson)

14 min
Penalties
22 min
37
Shots
19

9 April 2011; 15:00 CET	Sparta Warriors	3 – 0 (2–0, 0–0, 1–0)	Stavanger Oilers	Sparta Amfi, Sarpsborg; Attendance: 3,450

Game reference

Phil Osaer
Goalies
Antti Ore (out 20:00)
Ruben Smith (in 20:00)
Referee:
Owe Lüthcke

Malmström (Knelsen) (PP) - 10:07	1 – 0
Kristiansen (Robinson, Knelsen) (PP) - 17:52	2 – 0
Roest (EN) - 60:00	3 – 0

8 min
Penalties
16 min
22
Shots
27

Sparta won series 4–1

=== Statistics ===
==== Scoring leaders ====
These are the top ten skaters in the playoffs based on points. If the list exceeds ten skaters because of a tie in points, all of the tied skaters are shown.

Player	Team	GP	G	A	Pts	+/–	PIM
(Sweden) Henrik Malmström	Sparta Warriors	14	10	12	22	+7	10
(Norway) Christian Dahl Andersen	Stavanger Oilers	16	5	13	18	+4	18
(Sweden) Martin Strandfeldt	Stavanger Oilers	16	7	9	16	0	20
(Finland) Juha-Pekka Loikas	Stavanger Oilers	16	6	10	16	+3	24
(Canada) Dion Knelsen	Sparta Warriors	14	7	7	14	+10	8
(Canada) Cleve Kinley	Stavanger Oilers	16	2	12	14	+7	26
(Norway) Tommy Kristiansen	Sparta Warriors	14	8	5	13	+6	20
(Norway) Lars Erik Spets	Lørenskog	11	4	8	12	+3	2
(United States) Michael Vannelli	Stavanger Oilers	16	3	9	12	+3	32
(Canada) Evan Cheverie	Lillehammer	10	3	9	12	+4	24
(Norway) Magnus Selvaag	Sparta Warriors	14	2	10	12	+9	8

GP = Games played; G = Goals; A = Assists; Pts = Points; +/– = Plus–minus; PIM = Penalty minutes

==== Leading goaltenders ====
These are the top five goaltenders in the playoffs based on goals against average.

Player	Team	GP	TOI	W	L	GA	SO	Sv%	GAA
(United States) Phil Osaer	Sparta Warriors	14	893	12	2	16	6	95.0	1.29
(Canada) Jonathan Boutin	Lillehammer	10	590	5	5	21	0	93.5	2.13
(Finland) Antti Ore	Stavanger Oilers	16	916	9	7	40	2	90.0	2.62
(United States) Jordan Parise	Lørenskog	11	670	6	5	31	0	90.5	2.78
(Canada) Trevor Koenig	Storhamar Dragons	5	291	1	4	15	0	87.9	3.09

GP = Games played; TOI = Time on ice (minutes); W = Wins; L = Losses; GA = Goals against; SO = Shutouts; Sv% = Save percentage; GAA = Goals against average

== Qualifying for GET-ligaen 2011–12 ==
=== Final standings ===
	Team	GP	W	OTW	SOW	OTL	SOL	L	Pts	PCT	GF	GA	PIM	Home	Away
1	Manglerud Star (Q)	6	4	0	1	0	1	0	15	83	37	9	120	3-0-0-0	1-1-1-0
2	Stjernen (Q)	6	4	0	0	0	1	1	13	67	24	21	126	2-0-1-0	2-0-0-1
3	Tønsberg Vikings	6	1	0	1	0	0	4	5	33	17	24	91	1-1-0-1	0-0-0-3
4	Comet	6	1	0	0	0	0	5	3	17	13	37	114	1-0-0-2	0-0-0-3

GP = Games played; W = Wins; L = Losses; OTW = Overtime Wins; OTL = Overtime losses; SOW = Shootout Wins; SOL = Shootout losses; PCT = Percentage of possible points; GF = Goals for; GA = Goals against; PIM = Penalties in minutes; Pts = Points; Q = Qualified
Source: hockey.no

=== Game log ===
Qualifying for GET-ligaen 2011–12 Game Log
Rounds 1–6

Round 1

10 March 2011; 18:30 CET	Manglerud Star	6 – 3 (3–1, 2–1, 1–1)	Tønsberg Vikings	Manglerudhallen, Oslo

Game reference
			Referee: Kjell-Fredrik Kristiansen
12 min	Penalties	39 min	Referee: Kjell-Fredrik Kristiansen
28	Shots	10	Referee: Kjell-Fredrik Kristiansen

10 March 2011; 18:30 CET	Comet	1 – 6 (0–1, 1–2, 0–3)	Stjernen	Halden Ishall, Halden; Attendance: 1,767

Game reference
			Referee: Gudmund Lien
14 min	Penalties	16 min	Referee: Gudmund Lien
20	Shots	45	Referee: Gudmund Lien

Round 2

13 March 2011; 17:00 CET	Comet	0 – 5 (0–3, 0–1, 0–1)	Manglerud Star	Halden Ishall, Halden; Attendance: 1,014

Game reference
			Referee: Stian Halm
32 min	Penalties	12 min	Referee: Stian Halm
16	Shots	48	Referee: Stian Halm

13 March 2011; 17:00 CET	Tøsnberg Vikings	2 – 3 (0–1, 2–0, 0–2)	Stjernen	Tønsberg Ishall, Tønsberg

Game reference
			Referee: Robert Hallin
10 min	Penalties	22 min	Referee: Robert Hallin
29	Shots	45	Referee: Robert Hallin

Round 3

17 March 2011; 18:30 CET	Stjernen	2 – 3 (SO) (0–0, 2–2, 0–0, 0–0, 0/5–1/5)	Manglerud Star	Stjernehallen, Fredrikstad; Attendance: 600

Game reference
			Referee: Steven Richardson
21 min	Penalties	40 min	Referee: Steven Richardson
33	Shots	33	Referee: Steven Richardson

17 March 2011; 18:30 CET	Tønsberg Vikings	6 – 4 (1–2, 1–2, 4–0)	Comet	Tønsberg Ishall, Tønsberg

Game reference
			Referee: Hans Petter Berg
8 min	Penalties	12 min	Referee: Hans Petter Berg
68	Shots	26	Referee: Hans Petter Berg

Round 4

20 March 2011; 17:00 CET	Tønsberg Vikings	3 – 2 (SO) (0–1, 1–0, 1–1, 0–0, 1/3–0/3)	Manglerud Star	Tønsberg Ishall, Tønsberg

Game reference
			Referee: Robert Hallin
16 min	Penalties	22 min	Referee: Robert Hallin
36	Shots	56	Referee: Robert Hallin

20 March 2011; 17:00 CET	Stjernen	8 – 3 (2–1, 4–2, 2–0)	Comet	Stjernehallen, Fredrikstad

Game reference
			Referee: Steven Richardson
10 min	Penalties	12 min	Referee: Steven Richardson
44	Shots	16	Referee: Steven Richardson

Round 5

24 March 2011; 18:30 CET	Manglerud Star	11 – 1 (2–1, 4–0, 5–0)	Comet	Manglerudhallen, Oslo

Game reference
			Referee: Anders Engdahl Sørensen
6 min	Penalties	36 min	Referee: Anders Engdahl Sørensen
51	Shots	7	Referee: Anders Engdahl Sørensen

24 March 2011; 18:30 CET	Stjernen	5 – 2 (3–0, 1–0, 1–2)	Tønsberg Vikings	Stjernehallen, Fredrikstad; Attendance: 766

Game reference
			Referee: Morten Haglund
24 min	Penalties	14 min	Referee: Morten Haglund
37	Shots	25	Referee: Morten Haglund

Round 6

27 March 2011; 17:00 CET	Manglerud Star	10 – 0 (5–0, 3–0, 2–0)	Stjernen	Manglerudhallen, Oslo

Game reference
			Referee: Steven Richardson
35 min	Penalties	21 min	Referee: Steven Richardson
44	Shots	14	Referee: Steven Richardson

27 March 2011; 17:00 CET	Comet	4 – 1 (1–1, 0–0, 3–0)	Tønsberg Vikings	Halden Ishall, Halden; Attendance: 777

Game reference
			Referee: Hans Petter Berg
8 min	Penalties	4 min	Referee: Hans Petter Berg
14	Shots	34	Referee: Hans Petter Berg

== Awards ==
All-Star team

The following players were selected to the 2010–11 GET-ligaen All-Star team:

- Goaltender: Trevor Koenig (Storhamar)
- Defenseman: Mat Robinson (Sparta)
- Defenseman: Scott Hotham (Lillehammer)
- Center: Gino Guyer (Lillehammer)
- Winger: Martin Strandfeldt (Stavanger)
- Winger: Henrik Malmström (Sparta)

Other

- Player of the year: Gino Guyer (Lillehammer)
- Coach of the year: Petter Thoresen (Stavanger)
- Playoff MVP: Henrik Malmström (Sparta)
