= Robin Dahlstrøm =

Norwegian ice hockey player

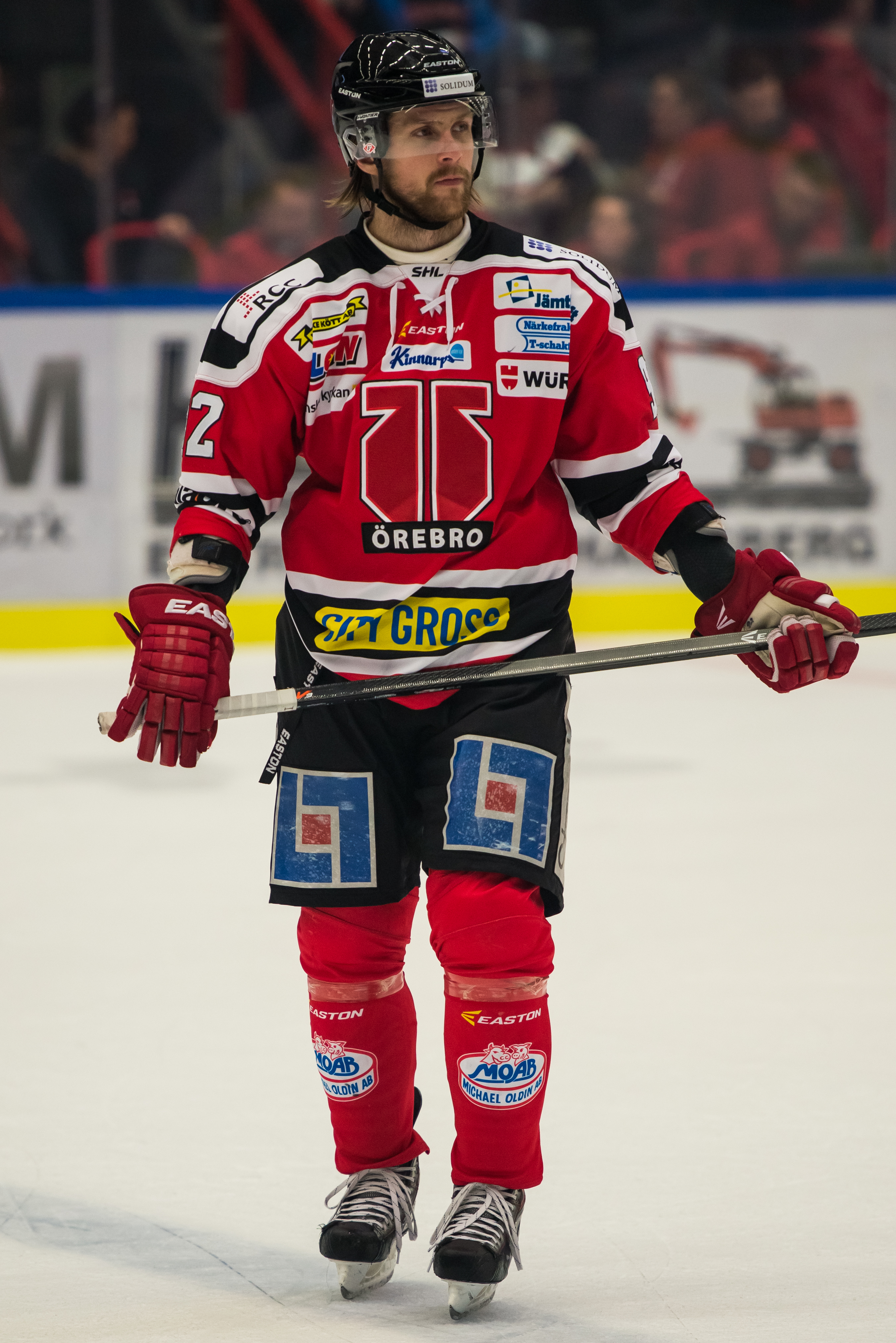
- Robin Dahlstrøm 2013
- Born: 29 January 1988 (age 38) Oslo, Norway
- Height: 6 ft 0 in (183 cm)
- Weight: 220 lb (100 kg; 15 st 10 lb)
- Position: Winger
- Shot: Left
- Played for: Storhamar; Frisk Asker; Sparta Warriors; IF Troja/Ljungby; Örebro HK; Djurgårdens IF; HC Vita Hästen; Lørenskog IK; AIK IF; Herning Blue Fox
- National team: Norway
- Playing career: 2005–2021

Robin Dahlstrøm (born 29 January 1988) is a Norwegian former professional ice hockey player who last played for Storhamar in the Norwegian hockey league GET-ligaen in 2021.

Dahlstrøm has played primarily in his native Norway for the Frisk Asker organization, including his junior and most of his professional career. In 2011 he moved to the Swedish club IF Troja/Ljungby in the HockeyAllsvenskan.

For the 2013–14 season Dahlstrøm signed with Örebro HK of the SHL. He was also loaned to HockeyAllsvenskan club Djurgårdens IF for several matches.

Dahlstrøm competed in the 2013 IIHF World Championship as a member of the Norway men's national ice hockey team. He was also named to Norway's 25 man roster for the 2014 Winter Olympics.

Mats Zuccarello of the Minnesota Wild (NHL) and Fabian Zuccarello of the Valencia Flyers (WSHL) are his step-brothers

== Awards ==
- 2005 - Bronze medal WJC-18 Div.1 (Norway U18)
- 2008 - Gold medal WJC-20 Div.1 (Norway U20)
- 2010–11 - Norwegian Champion (Sparta Warriors)

== Career statistics ==
=== Regular season and playoffs ===
			Regular season					Playoffs
Season	Team	League	GP	G	A	Pts	PIM	GP	G	A	Pts	PIM
2003–04	Vålerenga Ishockey	NOR U19	5	0	0	0	0	—	—	—	—	—
2004–05	Vålerenga Ishockey	NOR U18	17	25	11	36	36	—	—	—	—	—
2004–05	Vålerenga Ishockey	NOR U19	24	12	7	19	16	—	—	—	—	—
2005–06	Frisk Asker	NOR U19	22	25	13	38	60	—	—	—	—	—
2005–06	Frisk Asker	NOR	5	1	1	2	0	4	1	0	1	2
2006–07	Frisk Asker II	NOR.2	2	4	1	5	12	—	—	—	—	—
2006–07	Frisk Asker	NOR	43	7	6	13	24	7	2	1	3	6
2007–08	Frisk Asker	NOR	43	17	19	36	22	15	4	7	11	10
2008–09	Frisk Asker	NOR	45	16	15	31	76	5	1	1	2	10
2009–10	Frisk Asker	NOR	47	14	22	36	90	5	7	2	9	8
2010–11	Sparta Warriors	NOR	45	22	18	40	44	14	6	2	8	12
2011–12	IF Troja/Ljungby	Allsv	50	13	7	20	49	—	—	—	—	—
2012–13	IF Troja/Ljungby	Allsv	49	12	13	25	28	—	—	—	—	—
2013–14	Örebro HK	SHL	27	3	0	3	10	—	—	—	—	—
2013–14	Djurgårdens IF	Allsv	6	0	1	1	6	—	—	—	—	—
2014–15	Örebro HK	SHL	7	0	0	0	4	—	—	—	—	—
2014–15	HC Vita Hästen	Allsv	37	3	10	13	37	9	0	2	2	4
2015–16	Lørenskog IK	NOR	41	20	19	39	40	17	4	1	5	4
2016–17	Lørenskog IK	NOR	9	2	5	7	12	—	—	—	—	—
2016–17	AIK	Allsv	35	3	2	5	20	—	—	—	—	—
2016–17	Herning Blue Fox	DNK	6	0	2	2	4	6	0	0	0	0
2017–18	Storhamar Dragons	NOR	36	18	17	35	70	14	5	2	7	14
2018–19	Storhamar Dragons	NOR	45	16	10	26	36	16	6	4	10	12
2019–20	Storhamar Dragons	NOR	41	12	16	28	34	—	—	—	—	—
2020–21	Storhamar Dragons	NOR	22	4	5	9	52	—	—	—	—	—
2021–22	Hasle/Løren IL	NOR.2	6	1	2	3	2	—	—	—	—	—
NOR totals			422	149	153	302	500	97	36	20	56	78
Allsv totals			177	31	33	64	140	9	0	2	2	4

=== International ===
Year	Team	Event	GP	G	A	Pts	PIM
2005	Norway	WJC18 D1	5	0	0	0	0
2006	Norway	WJC18	6	2	1	3	8
2007	Norway	WJC D1	5	2	1	3	2
2008	Norway	WJC D1	5	2	2	4	6
2013	Norway	WC	5	0	0	0	2
2014	Norway	OG	4	0	0	0	0
2014	Norway	WC	7	0	0	0	2
2015	Norway	WC	7	0	0	0	0
2016	Norway	WC	7	0	0	0	0
Junior totals			21	6	4	10	16
Senior totals			30	0	0	0	4
