= Tommy Kristiansen =

Norwegian ice hockey player

- Born: 26 May 1989 (age 35); Sarpsborg, Norway
- Height: 6 ft 3 in (191 cm)
- Weight: 212 lb (96 kg; 15 st 2 lb)
- Position: Forward
- Shoots: Right
- GET team Former teams: Stavanger Oilers; Sparta Warriors; HV71; Krefeld Pinguine
- National team: Norway
- Playing career: 2005–present

Tommy Raymond Kristiansen (born 26 May 1989) is a Norwegian professional ice hockey forward who is currently playing for the Stavanger Oilers in the GET-ligaen.

Kristiansen played four seasons with the Stavanger Oilers in Norway's GET-ligaen through the conclusion of the 2016–17 season, before leaving as a free agent to sign a one-year deal with German outfit Krefeld Pinguine of the DEL on April 16, 2017.

He participated at the 2011 and 2012 IIHF World Championships as a member of the Norway men's national ice hockey team.

== Career statistics ==
=== Regular season and playoffs ===
			Regular season					Playoffs
Season	Team	League	GP	G	A	Pts	PIM	GP	G	A	Pts	PIM
2005–06	Sparta Warriors	NOR	11	0	0	0	2	—	—	—	—	—
2006–07	Sparta Warriors	NOR	11	0	0	0	29	1	0	0	0	0
2006–07	Sparta Warriors II	NOR.2	23	22	7	29	99	—	—	—	—	—
2007–08	Sparta Warriors	NOR	37	7	11	18	111	6	0	2	2	10
2007–08	Sparta Warriors II	NOR.2	1	3	0	3	4	—	—	—	—	—
2008–09	Sparta Warriors	NOR	34	8	7	15	82	—	—	—	—	—
2008–09	Sparta Warriors II	NOR.2	6	2	2	4	12	—	—	—	—	—
2009–10	Sparta Warriors	NOR	33	7	13	20	50	11	6	1	7	28
2010–11	Sparta Warriors	NOR	38	17	17	34	115	14	8	5	13	20
2010–11	Sparta Warriors II	NOR.2	1	0	1	1	2	—	—	—	—	—
2011–12	Sparta Warriors	NOR	11	3	8	11	74	—	—	—	—	—
2011–12	HV71	SEL	32	3	3	6	22	5	0	1	1	4
2012–13	HV71	SEL	41	4	2	6	43	5	0	1	1	2
2012–13	Sparta Warriors	NOR	11	2	2	4	12	—	—	—	—	—
2013–14	Stavanger Oilers	NOR	43	11	19	30	172	16	4	11	15	73
2014–15	Stavanger Oilers	NOR	42	20	19	39	135	14	5	5	10	12
2015–16	Stavanger Oilers	NOR	41	18	11	29	128	16	7	2	9	40
2016–17	Stavanger Oilers	NOR	43	21	16	37	146	14	7	2	9	61
2017–18	Krefeld Pinguine	DEL	17	2	1	3	22	—	—	—	—	—
2017–18	Sparta Warriors	NOR	25	10	8	18	90	10	3	2	5	57
2018–19	Sparta Warriors	NOR	46	23	11	34	250	6	2	1	3	16
2019–20	Stavanger Oilers	NOR	36	16	11	27	128	—	—	—	—	—
2020–21	Stavanger Oilers	NOR	19	6	5	11	49	—	—	—	—	—
2021–22	Stavanger Oilers	NOR	33	5	16	21	72	13	3	2	5	42
NOR totals			514	174	174	348	1647	120	45	33	78	359
SEL totals			73	7	5	12	65	10	0	2	2	6

=== International ===
Year	Team	Event	GP	G	A	Pts	PIM
2006	Norway	WJC18	6	1	0	1	10
2007	Norway	WJC18 D1	5	5	4	9	6
2008	Norway	WJC D1	5	1	1	2	12
2009	Norway	WJC D1	4	0	2	2	6
2011	Norway	WC	3	0	0	0	4
2012	Norway	WC	6	0	0	0	2
2016	Norway	OGQ	3	1	0	1	4
2018	Norway	OG	5	1	1	2	29
2018	Norway	WC	7	0	0	0	8
2019	Norway	WC	2	0	0	0	2
2021	Norway	WC	6	0	0	0	8
Junior totals			20	7	7	14	34
Senior totals			32	2	1	3	57
