= Niklas Roest =

Norwegian ice hockey player

- Born: August 3, 1986 (age 40) Oslo, Norway
- Height: 5 ft 9 in (175 cm)
- Weight: 179 lb (81 kg; 12 st 11 lb)
- Position: Left wing
- Shoots: Left
- GET team Former teams: Sparta Warriors; Manglerud Star; BIK Karlskoga
- National team: Norway
- Playing career: 2005–present

Niklas Roest (born August 3, 1986) is a Norwegian ice hockey player who is currently playing for Sparta Sarpsborg of the GET-ligaen.

Roest competed in the 2013 and 2014 IIHF World Championships, and the 2014 Winter Olympics as a member of the Norway men's national ice hockey team.

== Career statistics ==
=== Regular season and playoffs ===
| | | | Regular season | | | | | Playoffs |
| Season | Team | League | GP | G | A | Pts | PIM | GP | G | A | Pts | PIM |
|---|---|---|---|---|---|---|---|---|---|---|---|---|
| 2002–03 | Manglerud Star | NOR U19 | 17 | 2 | 2 | 4 | 10 | — | — | — | — | — |
| 2003–04 | Manglerud Star | NOR U19 | 34 | 17 | 23 | 40 | 97 | — | — | — | — | — |
| 2004–05 | Manglerud Star | NOR.2 | 31 | 9 | 10 | 19 | 8 | — | — | — | — | — |
| 2005–06 | Manglerud Star | NOR | 41 | 4 | 12 | 16 | 28 | — | — | — | — | — |
| 2006–07 | Sparta Warriors | NOR | 39 | 4 | 4 | 8 | 90 | 12 | 0 | 2 | 2 | 6 |
| 2006–07 | Sparta Warriors II | NOR.2 | 3 | 5 | 2 | 7 | 2 | — | — | — | — | — |
| 2007–08 | Sparta Warriors | NOR | 22 | 3 | 6 | 9 | 92 | 6 | 0 | 1 | 1 | 8 |
| 2007–08 | Sparta Warriors II | NOR.2 | 1 | 1 | 1 | 2 | 4 | — | — | — | — | — |
| 2008–09 | Sparta Warriors | NOR | 42 | 8 | 7 | 15 | 94 | 15 | 1 | 3 | 4 | 24 |
| 2009–10 | Sparta Warriors | NOR | 48 | 7 | 12 | 19 | 77 | 12 | 1 | 2 | 3 | 10 |
| 2010–11 | Sparta Warriors | NOR | 45 | 3 | 12 | 15 | 59 | 14 | 4 | 5 | 9 | 55 |
| 2011–12 | Sparta Warriors | NOR | 45 | 9 | 15 | 24 | 115 | 7 | 3 | 0 | 3 | 24 |
| 2012–13 | Sparta Warriors | NOR | 45 | 15 | 23 | 38 | 88 | 11 | 5 | 7 | 12 | 14 |
| 2013–14 | BIK Karlskoga | Allsv | 37 | 3 | 8 | 11 | 65 | 6 | 1 | 2 | 3 | 4 |
| 2014–15 | Sparta Warriors | NOR | 41 | 17 | 23 | 40 | 80 | 11 | 3 | 4 | 7 | 16 |
| 2015–16 | Sparta Warriors | NOR | 39 | 10 | 19 | 29 | 26 | 6 | 0 | 3 | 3 | 6 |
| 2016–17 | Sparta Warriors | NOR | 45 | 21 | 20 | 41 | 71 | 11 | 3 | 3 | 6 | 14 |
| 2017–18 | Sparta Warriors | NOR | 43 | 15 | 37 | 52 | 59 | 9 | 3 | 7 | 10 | 8 |
| 2018–19 | Sparta Warriors | NOR | 45 | 5 | 31 | 36 | 83 | 3 | 1 | 2 | 3 | 2 |
| 2019–20 | Sparta Warriors | NOR | 31 | 11 | 16 | 27 | 76 | — | — | — | — | — |
| 2020–21 | Sparta Sarpsborg | NOR | 19 | 2 | 8 | 10 | 14 | — | — | — | — | — |
| 2021–22 | Sparta Sarpsborg | NOR | 45 | 14 | 32 | 46 | 42 | 10 | 2 | 4 | 6 | 4 |
| 2022–23 | Sparta Sarpsborg | NOR | 41 | 6 | 31 | 37 | 28 | 8 | 2 | 6 | 8 | 8 |
| NOR totals | | | 676 | 154 | 308 | 462 | 1122 | 135 | 28 | 49 | 77 | 199 |

=== International ===
| Year | Team | Event | GP | G | A | Pts | PIM |
|---|---|---|---|---|---|---|---|
| 2006 | Norway | WJC | 6 | 0 | 0 | 0 | 6 |
| 2013 | Norway | WC | 7 | 0 | 0 | 0 | 2 |
| 2014 | Norway | OG | 3 | 0 | 0 | 0 | 0 |
| 2014 | Norway | WC | 7 | 1 | 0 | 1 | 2 |
| 2015 | Norway | WC | 7 | 0 | 0 | 0 | 2 |
| 2016 | Norway | WC | 3 | 0 | 0 | 0 | 0 |
| 2016 | Norway | OGQ | 3 | 0 | 0 | 0 | 0 |
| 2017 | Norway | WC | 7 | 0 | 0 | 0 | 4 |
| 2018 | Norway | OG | 5 | 0 | 0 | 0 | 2 |
| 2018 | Norway | WC | 7 | 0 | 0 | 0 | 4 |
| 2019 | Norway | WC | 5 | 0 | 0 | 0 | 2 |
| Senior totals | | | 54 | 1 | 0 | 1 | 18 |
