= Alexander Reichenberg =

Swedish-Norwegian ice hockey player (1992–2024)

Aleksander Reichenberg
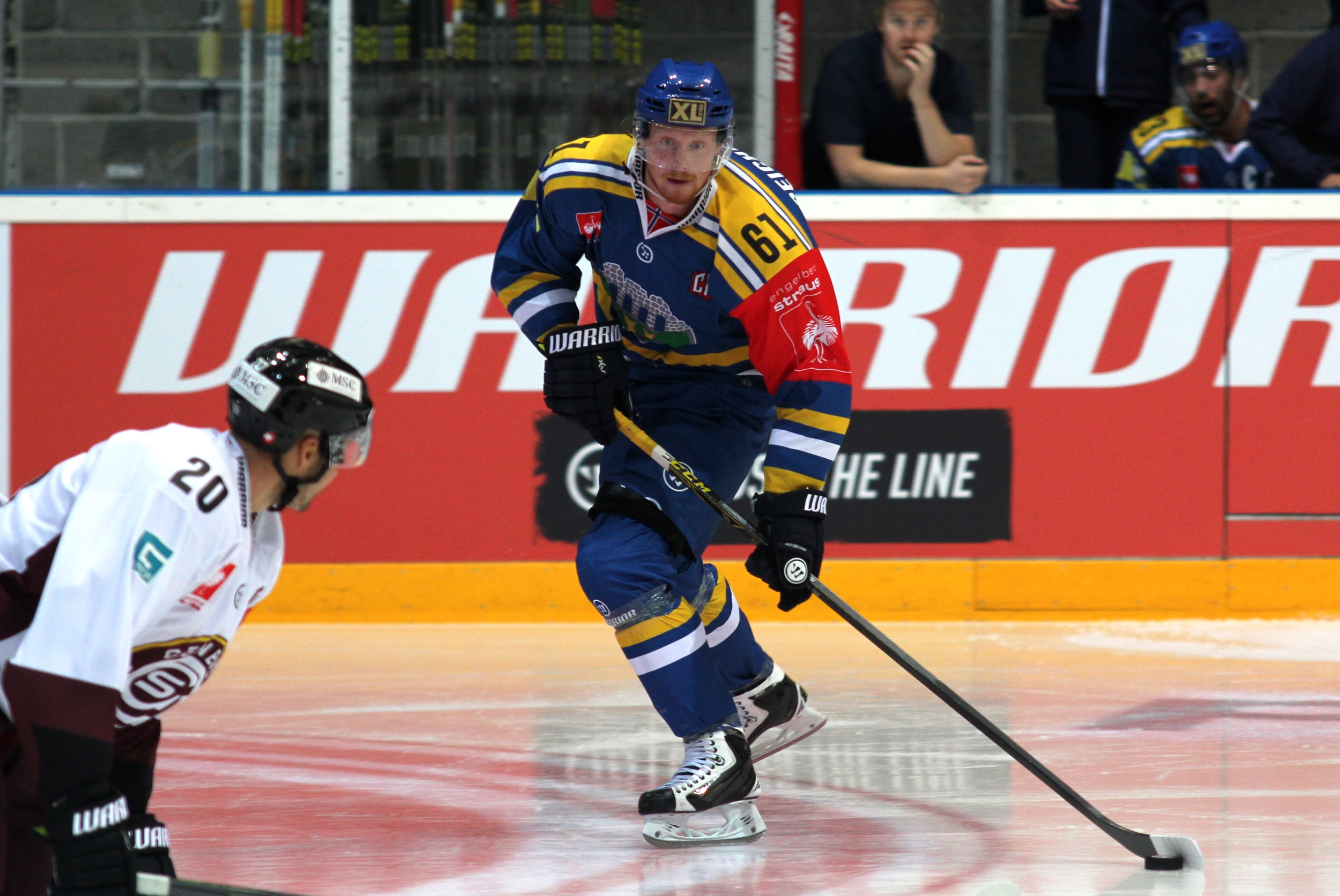
- Reichenberg in 2015
- Born: 13 June 1992 Mora, Sweden
- Died: 5 May 2024 (aged 31)
- Height: 6 ft 1 in (185 cm)
- Weight: 174 lb (79 kg; 12 st 6 lb)
- Position: Forward
- Shot: Left
- SHL team Former teams: IK Oskarshamn; Lillehammer IK; Storhamar Ishockey; HC Sparta Praha; Färjestad BK
- National team: Norway
- Playing career: 2008–2024

Aleksander Prince Fredrik Ramprecht Reichenberg (13 June 1992 – 5 May 2024) was a Swedish-Norwegian professional ice hockey player who played as a forward. At international level, he represented the Norwegian national team.

== Club career ==
While born in Mora, Sweden, Reichenberg began his professional career with hometown club, Lillehammer IK in the GET-ligaen (GET) during the 2008–09 season.

After playing two seasons with rival club Storhamar Ishockey and moving abroad for the 2017–18 season with HC Sparta Praha of the Czech Extraliga (ELH), Reichenberg returned to Lillehammer on 1 September 2018.

In the 2018–19 season, Reichenberg compiled 12 points in just 10 games with Lillehammer before leaving on loan for the remainder of the season to join Swedish outfit, Färjestad BK of the SHL, on 16 December 2018. In a top 9 role, he added 4 goals and 7 points in 27 regular season games. In 9 playoff games, Reichenberg added 1 goal to help reach the semi-finals.

On 17 June 2019, Reichenberg opted to continue playing in the SHL, agreeing to a one-year contract with newly promoted club, IK Oskarshamn, for their maiden season in the top tier.

== International play ==
Reichenberg participated for Norway at the 2017 IIHF World Championship.

== Personal life ==
Reichenberg died by suicide on 5 May 2024, at the age of 31.

== Career statistics ==
=== Regular season and playoffs ===
			Regular season					Playoffs
Season	Team	League	GP	G	A	Pts	PIM	GP	G	A	Pts	PIM
2008–09	Lillehammer IK	NOR U19	25	30	28	58	20	—	—	—	—	—
2008–09	Lillehammer IK II	NOR.2	15	3	3	6	33	—	—	—	—	—
2009–10	Lillehammer IK	NOR U19	8	6	5	11	8	7	4	7	11	6
2009–10	Lillehammer IK II	NOR.2	21	10	15	25	34	—	—	—	—	—
2009–10	Lillehammer IK	NOR	39	0	1	1	10	1	0	0	0	0
2010–11	Lillehammer IK	NOR U19	1	0	0	0	0	4	2	9	11	0
2010–11	Lillehammer IK II	NOR.2	4	2	4	6	0	—	—	—	—	—
2010–11	Lillehammer IK	NOR	43	8	3	11	6	10	2	4	6	2
2011–12	Lillehammer IK	NOR	44	10	13	23	8	11	0	3	3	0
2012–13	Lillehammer IK	NOR	45	20	13	33	10	6	2	3	5	2
2013–14	Lillehammer IK	NOR	43	16	27	43	18	12	3	3	6	4
2014–15	Lillehammer IK	NOR	43	18	17	35	6	4	0	0	0	0
2015–16	Storhamar Dragons	NOR	43	11	20	31	8	13	2	1	3	0
2016–17	Storhamar Dragons	NOR	44	16	18	34	28	7	4	1	5	0
2017–18	HC Sparta Praha	ELH	41	6	8	14	14	1	0	0	0	0
2018–19	Lillehammer IK	NOR	10	3	9	12	12	—	—	—	—	—
2018–19	Färjestad BK	SHL	27	4	3	7	14	9	1	0	1	2
2019–20	IK Oskarshamn	SHL	17	0	2	2	4	—	—	—	—	—
2019–20	Graz99ers	AUT	22	6	1	7	8	3	0	0	0	2
2020–21	Stjernen Hockey	NOR	23	4	16	20	22	—	—	—	—	—
2021–22	Lillehammer IK	NOR	43	10	21	31	10	7	2	7	9	6
NOR totals			422	116	158	274	138	71	15	22	37	14

=== International ===
Year	Team	Event	GP	G	A	Pts	PIM
2010	Norway	WJC18 D1	3	1	0	1	0
2012	Norway	WJC D1A	5	1	0	1	2
2017	Norway	WC	7	2	1	3	2
2018	Norway	OG	3	2	0	2	2
2019	Norway	WC	7	2	3	5	0
Junior totals			8	2	0	2	2
Senior totals			19	5	4	9	6
