= Jonas Elofsson =

Swedish ice hockey player

- Born: January 31, 1979 (age 47) Ulricehamn, Sweden
- Height: 6 ft 0 in (183 cm)
- Weight: 198 lb (90 kg; 14 st 2 lb)
- Position: Defence
- Shot: Left
- Played for: Färjestad BK; HC TPS; HV71; Leksands IF; Dragons de Rouen; AaB Ishockey; Sparta Warriors
- National team: Sweden
- NHL draft: 94th overall, 1997; Edmonton Oilers
- Playing career: 1996–2012

Jonas Elofsson (born January 31, 1979) is a Swedish former professional ice hockey player. He last played for Sparta Warriors and has won two Swedish Championship with Färjestads BK in 1997 and 1998. He was drafted by the Edmonton Oilers in the 1997 NHL entry draft, as the 94th pick overall but never signed a contract.

== Career statistics ==
			Regular season					Playoffs
Season	Team	League	GP	G	A	Pts	PIM	GP	G	A	Pts	PIM
1995–96	Färjestad BK J20	J20 SuperElit	26	6	11	17	18	—	—	—	—	—
1996–97	Färjestad BK J20	J20 SuperElit	20	4	10	14	—	—	—	—	—	—
1996–97	Färjestad BK	SHL	3	0	0	0	0	5	0	1	1	0
1997–98	Färjestad BK J20	J20 SuperElit	13	10	9	19	18	—	—	—	—	—
1997–98	Färjestad BK	SHL	29	3	2	5	14	12	0	1	1	6
1998–99	Färjestad BK	SHL	40	2	7	9	18	4	0	0	0	0
1999–00	Färjestad BK	SHL	47	3	6	9	44	4	0	0	0	6
2000–01	HC TPS	Liiga	10	0	0	0	0	—	—	—	—	—
2000–01	HV71	SHL	30	1	3	4	12	—	—	—	—	—
2001–02	Leksands IF	Allsvenskan	40	9	24	33	16	10	1	1	2	10
2002–03	Leksands IF	SHL	46	6	3	9	26	5	0	0	0	8
2003–04	Leksands IF	SHL	45	1	5	6	40	10	0	3	3	12
2004–05	Dragons de Rouen	France	27	3	15	18	36	12	1	5	6	18
2005–06	AaB Ishockey	Denmark	29	6	16	22	16	16	1	10	11	14
2006–07	Leksands IF	Allsvenskan	41	4	19	23	43	10	3	3	6	16
2007–08	Leksands IF	Allsvenskan	41	8	11	19	26	9	1	2	3	4
2008–09	Sparta Warriors	Norway	45	18	30	48	34	—	—	—	—	—
2009–10	Sparta Warriors	Norway	42	6	24	30	24	11	2	8	10	10
2010–11	Sparta Warriors	Norway	32	2	21	23	12	12	0	10	10	4
2011–12	Sparta Warriors	Norway	10	2	7	9	2	7	2	0	2	4
SHL totals			240	16	26	42	154	40	0	5	5	32
