= Henrik Malmström =

Swedish ice hockey player

- Born: August 26, 1978 (age 48) Kristianstad, Sweden
- Height: 6 ft 1 in (185 cm)
- Weight: 201 lb (91 kg; 14 st 5 lb)
- Position: Right wing
- Shot: Right
- Played for: Sparta Warriors; Malmö Redhawks; HV71; Brynäs IF; Frölunda HC; Ilves; HK Acroni Jesenice
- Playing career: 1994–2018

Henrik Malmström (born August 26, 1978 in Kristianstad) is a Swedish retired professional ice hockey forward who last played for Sparta Warriors of the GET-ligaen in Norway.

Malmström began his career in the Swedish HockeyAllsvenskan, the country's second tier league, playing for his hometown team Kristianstads IK before moving to the Elitserien with Malmö Redhawks where he spent four seasons. He had a brief spell with HV71 in 2002 before returning to Malmö. In 2003, he moved to Brynäs IF and stayed with the team until 2006 when he joined Frölunda HC midway through the 2006-07 season. In 2007, he moved in Finland to play in the SM-liiga for Ilves and also had a brief spell with HK Acroni Jesenice of the Erste Bank Eishockey Liga.

== Career statistics ==
			Regular season					Playoffs
Season	Team	League	GP	G	A	Pts	PIM	GP	G	A	Pts	PIM
1994–95	Kristianstads IK	Division 2	12	0	0	0	0	—	—	—	—	—
1995–96	Kristianstads IK	Division 2	33	1	9	10	4	—	—	—	—	—
1996–97	MIF Redhawks J20	J20 SuperElit	30	9	10	19	—	—	—	—	—	—
1997–98	MIF Redhawks J20	J20 SuperElit	30	29	21	50	18	—	—	—	—	—
1998–99	MIF Redhawks	Elitserien	46	1	2	3	12	8	2	0	2	0
1999–00	MIF Redhawks J20	J20 SuperElit	1	0	1	1	0	—	—	—	—	—
1999–00	MIF Redhawks	Elitserien	43	1	9	10	4	6	1	0	1	0
2000–01	MIF Redhawks	Elitserien	50	6	6	12	10	9	3	2	5	6
2001–02	MIF Redhawks	Elitserien	48	6	8	14	10	5	0	0	0	2
2002–03	MIF Redhawks	Elitserien	40	2	1	3	8	—	—	—	—	—
2002–03	HV71	Elitserien	9	1	0	1	0	—	—	—	—	—
2003–04	Brynäs IF	Elitserien	49	9	7	16	22	—	—	—	—	—
2004–05	Brynäs IF	Elitserien	50	12	9	21	20	—	—	—	—	—
2005–06	Brynäs IF	Elitserien	50	9	13	22	28	4	1	1	2	4
2006–07	Brynäs IF	Elitserien	5	0	0	0	2	—	—	—	—	—
2006–07	Frölunda HC	Elitserien	46	0	1	1	14	—	—	—	—	—
2007–08	Ilves	SM-liiga	15	0	1	1	6	—	—	—	—	—
2007–08	HK Jesenice	EBEL	2	0	0	0	0	5	0	5	5	6
2007–08	HK Jesenice	Slovenia	—	—	—	—	—	4	0	4	4	0
2008–09	Sparta Sarpsborg	Norway	42	25	37	62	26	—	—	—	—	—
2009–10	Sparta Sarpsborg	Norway	37	18	27	45	16	2	0	0	0	2
2010–11	Sparta Sarpsborg	Norway	44	24	41	65	24	14	10	12	22	10
2011–12	Sparta Sarpsborg	Norway	45	19	33	52	50	7	4	1	5	2
2012–13	Sparta Sarpsborg	Norway	43	21	30	51	22	—	—	—	—	—
2013–14	Sparta Sarpsborg	Norway	44	22	19	41	22	5	2	2	4	12
2014–15	Sparta Sarpsborg	Norway	45	21	42	63	20	11	4	8	12	6
2015–16	Sparta Sarpsborg	Norway	43	14	24	38	55	6	1	3	4	0
2016–17	Sparta Sarpsborg	Norway	44	19	19	38	20	10	2	2	4	0
2017–18	Sparta Sarpsborg	Norway	45	12	18	30	18	10	0	1	1	0
Elitserien totals			436	47	56	103	130	32	7	3	10	12
Norway totals			432	195	290	485	273	65	23	29	52	32
