= CCHA Scholar-Athlete of the Year =

- Sport: Ice hockey
- Awarded for: The Top Scholar amongst the players in the CCHA

History
- First award: 2005; 2022
- Final award: 2026
- Most recent: Lucas Wahlin

The CCHA Scholar-Athlete of the Year is an annual award given out at the conclusion of the Central Collegiate Hockey Association regular season to the best scholar in the conference as voted by the coaches of each CCHA team. Faculty representatives select the player, who must have at least a 3.25 GPA through the end of the fall semester, who will be named as the scholar-athlete for each team in the CCHA with each nominee being eligible for the conference award.

The 'Scholar-Athlete of the Year' was first awarded in 2005 and every year thereafter until 2013 when the CCHA was dissolved as a consequence of the Big Ten forming its men's ice hockey conference. The award was revived for the 2021–22 season when a new CCHA began play.

Michael Eickman is the only player to win the award more than once.

== Award winners ==
Year	Winner	Position	Team
2004–05	Cory McLean	Forward	Notre Dame Fighting Irish
2005–06	Michael Eickman	Defenceman	Nebraska-Omaha Mavericks
2006–07	Michael Eickman	Defenceman	Nebraska-Omaha Mavericks
2007–08	Jeff Lerg	Goaltender	Michigan State Spartans
2008–09	Jordan Pearce	Goaltender	Notre Dame Fighting Irish
2009–10	Dion Knelsen	Center	Alaska Nanooks
2010–11	Carter Camper	Center	Miami RedHawks
2011–12	Chad Billins	Defenceman	Ferris State Bulldogs
2012–13	Adam Henderson	Left wing	Alaska Nanooks
2021–22	Ben Newhouse	Defenceman	Northern Michigan Wildcats
2022–23	Brendan Furry	Left wing	Minnesota State Mavericks
2023–24	Blake Pietila	Goaltender	Michigan Tech Huskies
2024–25	Alex Tracy	Goaltender	Minnesota State Mavericks
2025–26	Lucas Wahlin	Right wing	St. Thomas Tommies

=== Winners by school ===
School	Winners
Alaska	2
Minnesota State	2
Nebraska-Omaha	2
Notre Dame	2
Ferris State	1
Miami	1
Michigan State	1
Michigan Tech	1
Northern Michigan	1
St. Thomas	1

=== Winners by position ===
Position	Winners
Center	2
Right wing	1
Left wing	2
Forward	1
Defenceman	4
Goaltender	4

== See also ==
- CCHA Awards
