= Mat Robinson =

Canadian ice hockey defenceman

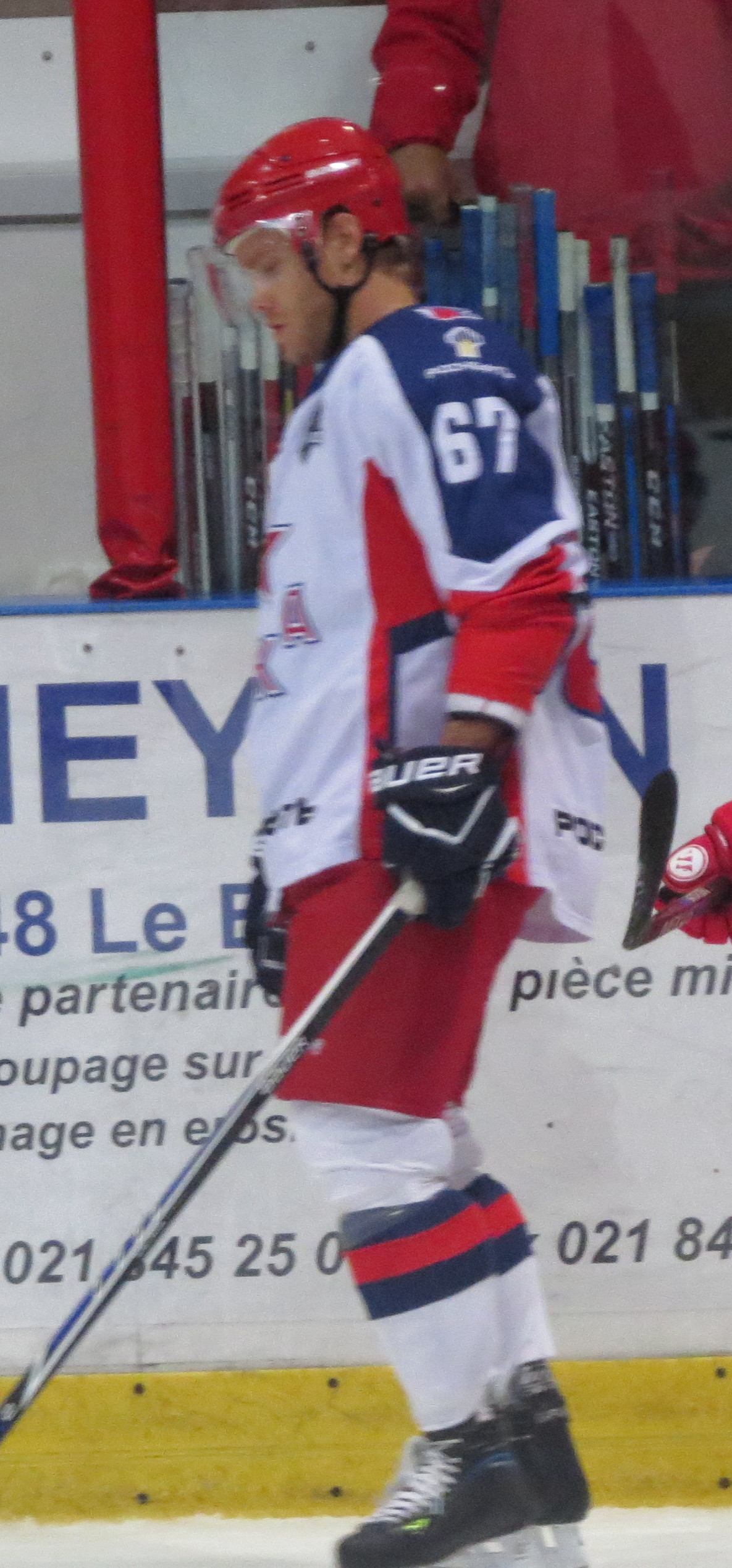
- Born: June 20, 1986 (age 40) Calgary, Alberta, Canada
- Height: 5 ft 10 in (178 cm)
- Weight: 185 lb (84 kg; 13 st 3 lb)
- Position: Defence
- Shot: Right
- Played for: Binghamton Senators; Sparta Warriors; Timrå IK; Dinamo Riga; Dynamo Moscow; CSKA Moscow; SKA Saint Petersburg
- National team: Canada
- NHL draft: Undrafted
- Playing career: 2009–2022

Mat Robinson (born June 20, 1986) is a Canadian former professional ice hockey defenceman. Robinson played professionally from 2009 to 2022, most notably in the KHL, with CSKA Moscow with whom he won the Gagarin Cup Championship in 2019. He also played in the KHL with Dinamo Riga, and SKA Saint Petersburg.

Robinson was named to the Canada men's national ice hockey team for the 2018 Olympic Winter Games, where he won a bronze medal.

== Playing career ==
Before turning professional, Robinson attended the University of Alaska Anchorage where he played four seasons of NCAA Division I college hockey with the Alaska Anchorage Seawolves In his final season, Robinson led all UAA defencemen in scoring and was the Seawolves' captain.

At the end of the 2008–09 season, Robinson signed with the Las Vegas Wranglers of the ECHL. In 2009, Robinson was invited to the Ottawa Senators' rookie camp and made the Senators' main training camp roster on a professional tryout. Robinson was assigned to the Binghamton Senators, Ottawa's American Hockey League affiliate. Robinson split the season between Binghamton and the Elmira Jackals of the ECHL.

After the 2009–10 season spent in the minors, Robinson decided to move to Europe to further his career. Robinson signed with the Norwegian club Sparta Warriors. After a good season with Sparta, Robinson moved to the Swedish league. Robinson played two seasons with Timra IK.

In May 2013, Robinson signed with Latvian club, Dinamo Riga of the KHL. In the 2013–14 season, Robinson impressed on Riga's blueline, contributing with 10 goals and 27 points in 54 games.

On May 3, 2014, he was signed to a lucrative two-year contract with fellow KHL competitor Dynamo Moscow.

After three seasons with Dynamo, Robinson, while still contracted, was granted free agent status from the KHL following the 2016–17 season due to the club's debt on July 4, 2017. With Dynamo unwilling to offer an improved contract, Robinson left to sign a two-year contract with CSKA Moscow the following day on July 5, 2017.

Following four seasons with CSKA, Robinson left the club as a free agent and signed a one-year deal into the 2021–22 season with rival club, SKA Saint Petersburg on September 15, 2021. In his lone season with SKA, Robinson collected 10 points through 35 regular season games. Following a conference finals defeat to former club CSKA Moscow, Robinson concluded his 13-year professional career by announcing his retirement on April 15, 2022.

== International play ==
Medal record

Representing Canada

Ice hockey

Olympic Games
| Bronze medal – third place | 2018 Pyeongchang | |

During the 2017–18 season, Robinson was selected to represent Canada at the 2018 Winter Olympics in Pyeongchang, South Korea. Used in a defensive depth role, Robinson contributed with 1 goal and 2 points in 6 games to help Canada claim the bronze medal.

In January 2022, Robinson was selected to make his second Olympic appearance and play for Canada at the 2022 Winter Olympics.

== Career statistics ==
=== Regular season and playoffs ===
| | | | Regular season | | | | | Playoffs |
| Season | Team | League | GP | G | A | Pts | PIM | GP | G | A | Pts | PIM |
|---|---|---|---|---|---|---|---|---|---|---|---|---|
| 2001–02 | Calgary Northstars AAA | AMHL | 11 | 1 | 1 | 2 | 4 | — | — | — | — | — |
| 2002–03 | Calgary Northstars AAA | AMHL | 32 | 10 | 13 | 23 | 55 | — | — | — | — | — |
| 2003–04 | Calgary Royals | AJHL | 53 | 4 | 18 | 22 | 23 | — | — | — | — | — |
| 2004–05 | Calgary Royals | AJHL | 38 | 11 | 15 | 26 | 26 | — | — | — | — | — |
| 2005–06 | University of Alaska Anchorage | WCHA | 35 | 1 | 6 | 7 | 26 | — | — | — | — | — |
| 2006–07 | University of Alaska Anchorage | WCHA | 37 | 2 | 7 | 9 | 30 | — | — | — | — | — |
| 2007–08 | University of Alaska Anchorage | WCHA | 36 | 3 | 10 | 13 | 12 | — | — | — | — | — |
| 2008–09 | University of Alaska Anchorage | WCHA | 35 | 3 | 12 | 15 | 37 | — | — | — | — | — |
| 2008–09 | Las Vegas Wranglers | ECHL | 4 | 1 | 1 | 2 | 2 | — | — | — | — | — |
| 2009–10 | Elmira Jackals | ECHL | 61 | 6 | 26 | 32 | 30 | 5 | 1 | 0 | 1 | 2 |
| 2009–10 | Binghamton Senators | AHL | 5 | 0 | 1 | 1 | 2 | — | — | — | — | — |
| 2010–11 | Sparta Warriors | NOR | 45 | 14 | 29 | 43 | 30 | 14 | 3 | 7 | 10 | 32 |
| 2011–12 | Timrå IK | SEL | 55 | 4 | 16 | 20 | 45 | — | — | — | — | — |
| 2012–13 | Timrå IK | SEL | 55 | 7 | 16 | 23 | 32 | — | — | — | — | — |
| 2013–14 | Dinamo Riga | KHL | 54 | 10 | 17 | 27 | 12 | 7 | 0 | 2 | 2 | 2 |
| 2014–15 | Dynamo Moscow | KHL | 34 | 10 | 12 | 22 | 37 | 11 | 2 | 4 | 6 | 6 |
| 2015–16 | Dynamo Moscow | KHL | 58 | 14 | 24 | 38 | 18 | 10 | 0 | 2 | 2 | 12 |
| 2016–17 | Dynamo Moscow | KHL | 53 | 7 | 14 | 21 | 30 | 4 | 0 | 0 | 0 | 0 |
| 2017–18 | CSKA Moscow | KHL | 42 | 6 | 16 | 22 | 47 | 18 | 2 | 0 | 2 | 4 |
| 2018–19 | CSKA Moscow | KHL | 52 | 5 | 11 | 16 | 22 | 20 | 5 | 5 | 10 | 6 |
| 2019–20 | CSKA Moscow | KHL | 58 | 1 | 20 | 21 | 12 | 4 | 1 | 0 | 1 | 0 |
| 2020–21 | CSKA Moscow | KHL | 52 | 5 | 12 | 17 | 24 | 23 | 3 | 7 | 10 | 8 |
| 2021–22 | SKA Saint Petersburg | KHL | 35 | 3 | 7 | 10 | 18 | 16 | 1 | 0 | 1 | 4 |
| SHL totals | | | 110 | 11 | 32 | 43 | 77 | — | — | — | — | — |
| KHL totals | | | 438 | 61 | 133 | 194 | 220 | 113 | 14 | 20 | 34 | 42 |

=== International ===
| Year | Team | Event | Result | GP | G | A | Pts | PIM |
|---|---|---|---|---|---|---|---|---|
| 2018 | Canada | OG | 3rd place, bronze medalist(s) | 6 | 1 | 1 | 2 | 0 |
| 2022 | Canada | OG | 6th | 5 | 1 | 0 | 1 | 0 |
| Senior totals | | | | 11 | 2 | 1 | 3 | 0 |

== Awards and honours ==
| Award | Year |
|---|---|
College
| WCHA All-Academic Team | 2009 |
KHL
| Gentleman Award | 2014 |
| All-Star Game | 2016, 2017 |
| Gagarin Cup (CSKA Moscow) | 2019 |
