= Marc Cheverie =

Canadian ice hockey player (born 1987)

- Born: February 22, 1987 (age 39) Cole Harbour, Nova Scotia, Canada
- Height: 6 ft 2 in (188 cm)
- Weight: 185 lb (84 kg; 13 st 3 lb)
- Position: Goaltender
- Caught: Left
- Played for: Rochester Americans; Portland Pirates; Binghamton Senators; Dundee Stars
- NHL draft: 193rd overall, 2006; Florida Panthers
- Playing career: 2010–2015

Marc Cheverie (born February 22, 1987) is a retired Canadian professional ice hockey goaltender who spent time playing in the American Hockey League (AHL) as well as with the Dundee Stars in the Elite Ice Hockey League (EIHL). He was chosen by the Florida Panthers in the seventh round, 193rd overall, of the 2006 NHL entry draft.

== Playing career ==
On July 20, 2011, the Florida Panthers announced that they had agreed to a one-year, two-way contract with Cheverie. However, on September 8, 2011, the Panthers dealt him to the Phoenix Coyotes in a trade for Justin Bernhardt.

On June 22, 2012, during the NHL Entry Draft, the Coyotes completed a multi-asset trade by sending Cheverie, Harrison Ruopp, and a 2012 third-round draft selection (81st overall) to the Pittsburgh Penguins in exchange for Zbyněk Michálek.

On September 6, 2012, he agreed to a one-year contract with the Binghamton Senators, and afterward went on to play for the Colorado Eagles of the ECHL during the 2013–14 season.

On July 25, 2014, Cheverie inked his first, and ultimately only, overseas contract, joining the Dundee Stars of the Elite Ice Hockey League (EIHL) on a one-year agreement. During this time, he was also enrolled at the University of Dundee, pursuing a postgraduate degree in Business.

== Personal ==
His older brother, Evan, also pursued a career in professional hockey as a forward. Over his playing days, Evan competed in the American Hockey League (AHL), where he spent multiple seasons. After his time in North America, Evan extended his career overseas, playing in several European leagues.

== Career statistics ==
			Regular season									Playoffs
Season	Team	League	GP	W	L	T/OT	MIN	GA	SO	GAA	SV%	GP	W	L	MIN	GA	SO	GAA	SV%
2005–06	Nanaimo Clippers	BCHL	36	23	9	0	2032	86	4	2.54	.902	4	1	3	197	11	0	3.33	.888
2006–07	Nanaimo Clippers	BCHL	34	21	9	2	2015	104	3	3.10	.875	5	2	1	195	7	2	2.15	.885
2007–08	University of Denver	WCHA	5	1	0	0	141	4	0	1.70	.925	—	—	—	—	—	—	—	—
2008–09	University of Denver	WCHA	40	23	12	5	2383	93	4	2.34	.921	—	—	—	—	—	—	—	—
2009–10	University of Denver	WCHA	35	24	6	3	2044	71	6	2.08	.932	—	—	—	—	—	—	—	—
2010–11	Cincinnati Cyclones	ECHL	30	13	9	5	1695	88	3	3.11	.896	—	—	—	—	—	—	—	—
2010–11	Rochester Americans	AHL	15	2	7	1	675	44	0	3.91	.888	—	—	—	—	—	—	—	—
2011–12	Gwinnett Gladiators	ECHL	22	10	4	8	1353	61	1	2.71	.910	4	1	3	341	13	0	2.29	.912
2011–12	Portland Pirates	AHL	9	4	3	0	402	22	0	3.29	.893	—	—	—	—	—	—	—	—
2012–13	Elmira Jackals	ECHL	22	11	9	1	1271	55	3	2.60	.917	—	—	—	—	—	—	—	—
2012–13	Binghamton Senators	AHL	13	6	6	1	708	33	0	2.80	.907	—	—	—	—	—	—	—	—
2013–14	Colorado Eagles	ECHL	39	18	12	8	2323	103	1	2.66	.897	2	0	2	195	5	0	1.54	.948
2014–15	Dundee Stars	EIHL	51	14	34	2	2970	178	1	3.60	.891	—	—	—	—	—	—	—	—
2016–17	Gander Flyers	CWSHL	13	—	—	—	—	—	—	5.75	.882	2	—	—	—	—	—	—	.873
AHL totals			37	12	16	2	1785	99	0	3.33	.896	—	—	—	—	—	—	—	—

== Awards and honours ==
Award	Year
College
WCHA Second All-Star Team	2008–09
WCHA First All-Star Team	2009–10
WCHA Player of the Year	2009–10
AHCA West First-Team All-American	2009–10

Awards and achievements
Preceded by Jamie McBain	WCHA Player of the Year; 2009–10	Succeeded by Matt Frattin
