= Thomas Christian David =

Austrian composer and conductor (1925–2006)

- Born: 22 December 1925; Wels, Upper Austria
- Died: 19 January 2006 (aged 80); Vienna, Austria
- Education: St. Thomas School; Leipzig Conservatory; Mozarteum
- Occupations: Composer, conductor, choral conductor, and flutist
- Spouse: Mansooreh Ghasri
- Parent: Johann Nepomuk David (father)

Thomas Christian David (22 December 1925 – 19 January 2006) was an Austrian composer, conductor, choral conductor, and flutist. David was born in Wels, Upper Austria in 1925. He moved to Germany in 1934 at the age of nine with his father, composer Johann Nepomuk David, and mother. Thomas's younger brother, Lukas David, (1934–2021) later became a violinist. In 1967, at the age of forty-two, he married Mansooreh Ghasri (Persian: منصوره قصری), a Persian Opera singer and they moved to Iran. David was the chief conductor of the orchestra of the National Iranian Television NITV, and also taught at the University of Tehran for seven years until 1973. He had an enormous and invaluable role in the growth and development of the Classical music in Iran. He conducted numerous masterpieces in different venues in Iran from late 1960s to late 1990s.

== Life ==
David studied at the St. Thomas School in Leipzig, and was a member of the Thomanerchor under the baton of Karl Straube and Günther Ramin. He then studied at the Leipzig Conservatory and at the Mozarteum in Salzburg. In 1948, he moved to Stuttgart and studied musicology studies in Tübingen. He taught at the Mozarteum, from 1945 to 1948. Additionally, he was the head of the South German Madrigal choir and vocal coach at the Stuttgart Opera between 1948 and 1957. Starting in 1957, he taught at the University of Music and Performing Arts Vienna. In 1960, he led the Chamber Choir in Vienna.

In 1967, at the age of forty-two, he married Mansooreh (Behjat) Ghasri, a famous Persian opera singer after they worked together on Atossa opera. After their marriage, they moved to Iran. David was the chief conductor of the orchestra of the National Iranian Television NITV and also taught at University of Tehran for seven years until 1973. From 1974 to 1988, he was professor of music theory and composition at the Vienna Academy of Music. From 1980 to 1995, he was principal conductor of the Deutsches Symphonie-Orchester, Berlin. Between 1986 and 1988, he was the president of the Austrian Composers' Association. In 1992, he was the artistic director at the Cairo Opera House.

Thomas Christian David had an enormous and invaluable role in the growth and development of classical music in Iran. He conducted numerous masterpieces in different venues in Iran from late 1960s to late 1990s. While they were in Iran, Mansooreh taught singing. Mansooreh died a couple of months before Thomas in 2005, in Vienna, due to cancer. Thomas Christian David died at age 80, in 2006 in Vienna. He was buried at the Vienna Central Cemetery.

== Recorded works ==
List of Thomas Christian David's works:

- http://db.musicaustria.at/en/node/52379

Some recorded works of Thomas Christian David:

- Parts of the Carmen Suite, arranged by David, conducted by Leon Gregorian
- Bijan Manijeh composed by Hossein Dehlavi
- Ranginkamoon composed by Samin Baghtcheban
- Aziz Joon composed by David performed by The Verdehr Trio

Video of Atossa Opera by Thomas Christian David with Persian libretto, performed at Rudaki Hall, Tehran, 1967

- Atossa Opera

On-sale records of Thomas Christian David:

- On-Sale Records

== Awards ==
- State Prize for Music, 1961, Austrian Federal Ministry for Education, Arts and Culture
- Culture Prize of Upper Austria for music, 1979
- Austrian Cross of Honor for Science and Art, First Class, 1981

== Literature ==
- Sussan Khalladeh: Thomas Christian David, Conductor and Composer, Biography; Brandstätter Verlag, Vienna 2005, ISBN 3-902510-24-2.
- The catalog of the German National Library Biography of Thomas Christian David on musicaustria.
- http://www.musicaustria.at/magazin/neue-musik/artikel-berichte/100-jahre-oekb-vorschau-auf-die-jubilaeumswoche-mit-konzerten
- Flyer for his 70th birthday celebration, Vienna 1995.
- http://www.bildarchivaustria.at/Pages/ImageDetail.aspx?p_iBildID=15951860
