= Gino Guyer =

American ice hockey player (born 1983)

- Born: October 14, 1983 (age 42) Coleraine, Minnesota, U.S.
- Height: 5 ft 11 in (180 cm)
- Weight: 192 lb (87 kg; 13 st 10 lb)
- Position: Centre
- Shot: Left
- Played for: Lincoln Stars (USHL) 2000–2002; University of Minnesota (NCAA) 2002–2006; Philadelphia Phantoms (AHL) 2006; Texas Wildcatters (ECHL) 2006–2007; Alaska Aces (ECHL) 2007–2008; Phoenix RoadRunners (ECHL) 2008–2009; Bakersfield Condors (ECHL) 2009–2010; Lillehammer (GET) 2010–2012; Alleghe 2012–2013
- NHL draft: 165th overall, 2003; Dallas Stars
- Playing career: 2000–2013

Gino Guyer (born October 14, 1983, in Coleraine, Minnesota) is an American professional ice hockey centre.

== Draft ==
Guyer was drafted 165th overall by the Dallas Stars in the 2003 NHL entry draft. To date, he has yet to play in the National Hockey League.

== Career ==
=== Early career ===
After a standout career at Greenway High School, in which he was awarded the 2002 Minnesota Mr. Hockey award as the state's most outstanding high school player, Guyer was recruited by the University of Minnesota. He supplemented his development by playing a total of 20 games with the Lincoln Stars of the USHL, tallying a total of 9 goals and 12 assists in two seasons of play.

In 2003, as a freshman with the Gophers, Guyer scored 29 points; the most notable of which forced overtime in the NCAA National Semifinal against the University of Michigan. Ultimately, the Gophers would advance to the Division I National Championship, defeating the University of New Hampshire 5–1 in regulation, earning the program's 5th NCAA title.

Guyer would go on to captain the Golden Gophers in his senior year (2006). Though Guyer would tally only 14 points through 41 games, Minnesota went on to win the MacNaughton Cup, for their first outright WCHA title since 1992.

In 2006, he had a brief spell in the AHL team Philadelphia Phantoms, as well as in the ECHL teams Texas Wildcatters and Alaska Aces.

He then played two seasons for the Phoenix RoadRunners, and a single season for Bakersfield Condors.

== Career statistics ==
=== Regular season and playoffs ===
			Regular season					Playoffs
Season	Team	League	GP	G	A	Pts	PIM	GP	G	A	Pts	PIM
1998–99	Greenway High School	HSMN
1999–2000	Greenway High School	HSMN
2000–01	Lincoln Stars	USHL	5	2	2	4	2	10	3	5	8	0
2000–01	Greenway High School	HSMN		35	46	81		—	—	—	—	—
2001–02	Lincoln Stars	USHL	15	7	10	17	0	4	1	0	1	0
2001–02	Greenway High School	HSMN	26	35	50	85		—	—	—	—	—
2002–03	University of Minnesota	WCHA	41	13	16	29	10	—	—	—	—	—
2003–04	University of Minnesota	WCHA	44	11	21	32	14	—	—	—	—	—
2004–05	University of Minnesota	WCHA	44	12	20	32	10	—	—	—	—	—
2005–06	University of Minnesota	WCHA	41	4	10	14	10	—	—	—	—	—
2005–06	Philadelphia Phantoms	AHL	4	0	0	0	0	—	—	—	—	—
2006–07	Texas Wildcatters	ECHL	2	0	0	0	0	—	—	—	—	—
2006–07	Alaska Aces	ECHL	6	2	3	5	4	—	—	—	—	—
2007–08	Alaska Aces	ECHL	9	1	2	3	2	—	—	—	—	—
2007–08	Phoenix Roadrunners	ECHL	49	13	26	39	18	—	—	—	—	—
2008–09	Phoenix Roadrunners	ECHL	71	14	24	38	56	—	—	—	—	—
2009–10	Bakersfield Condors	ECHL	59	14	14	28	12	7	0	0	0	0
2010–11	Lillehammer IK	NOR	45	22	40	62	8	10	6	3	9	14
2011–12	Lillehammer IK	NOR	45	22	36	58	16	11	4	8	12	10
2012–13	Alleghe Hockey	ITA	21	5	6	11	6	4	2	1	3	0
ECHL totals			196	44	69	113	92	7	0	0	0	0
NOR totals			90	44	76	120	24	21	10	11	21	24

=== International ===
Year	Team	Event	GP	G	A	Pts	PIM
2000	United States	U17	6	3	1	4
2003	United States	WJC	7	1	2	3	4
Junior totals			13	4	3	7	4
