= Drew Fata =

Canadian ice hockey player

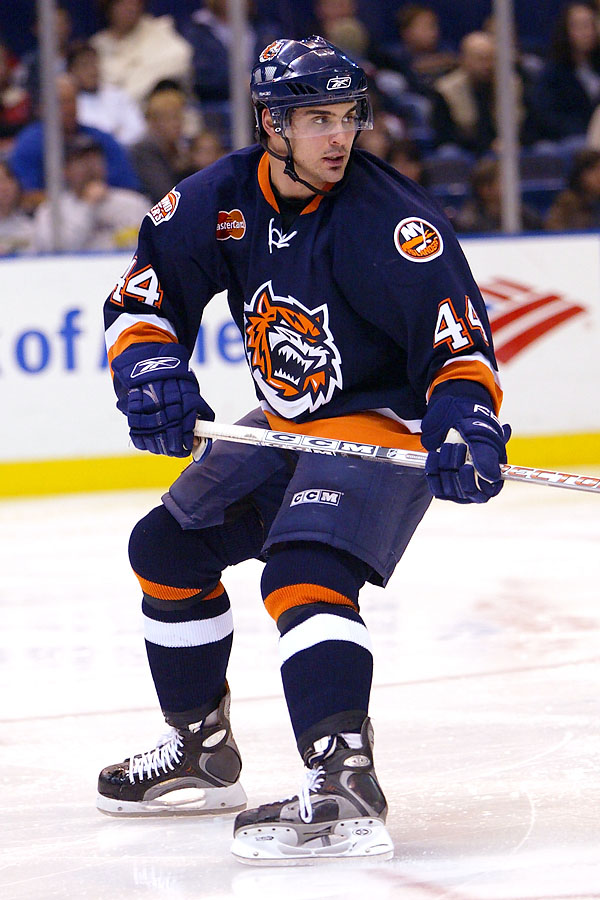
- Fata with the Bridgeport Sound Tigers in 2006
- Born: July 28, 1983 (age 42) Sault Ste. Marie, Ontario, Canada
- Height: 6 ft 1 in (185 cm)
- Weight: 220 lb (100 kg; 15 st 10 lb)
- Position: Defence
- Shot: Left
- Played for: New York Islanders; Sparta Sarpsborg; Sheffield Steelers
- NHL draft: 86th overall, 2001; Pittsburgh Penguins
- Playing career: 2003–2014

Drew Richard Fata (born July 28, 1983) is a Canadian former professional hockey defenceman. He is the younger brother of Rico Fata, who has played for several NHL teams over the course of his career.

== Playing career ==
As a youth, Fata played in the 1997 Quebec International Pee-Wee Hockey Tournament with a minor ice hockey team from Sault Ste. Marie, Ontario.

Fata was drafted 86th overall in the 2001 NHL entry draft by the Pittsburgh Penguins. Without playing a game for the Penguins, Fata signed as a free agent with the New York Islanders on February 4, 2007. When Islanders defenceman Sean Hill received a 20-game suspension on April 20, 2007 after testing positive performance-enhancing drugs, Drew Fata was called upon to take his place in the lineup. He then made his playoff debut against the Buffalo Sabres on April 20, though the Islanders lost the game and were eliminated from the postseason.

On July 2, 2008, Fata signed with the Phoenix Coyotes. Fata started the 2008–09 season with the Coyotes affiliate, San Antonio Rampage, before he was traded by the Coyotes to the Ottawa Senators for Alexander Nikulin on November 3, 2008.

On July 7, 2009, Fata signed a one-year, two-way deal with the Boston Bruins.

After coming off a season that involved ankle surgery, Fata did not receive any offers for four months. Eventually Fata was invited to return to the Wilkes-Barre/Scranton Penguins, the team where he started his professional career. After one game with the Penguins, Fata was released from his professional tryout contract on November 1, 2010.

On November 1, 2010 Fata signed with Sparta Sarpsborg of the Norwegian GET-ligaen

After a further three seasons abroad with HC Asiago and the Sheffield Steelers, Fata returned to North America to sign a one-year free agent contract with the Arizona Sundogs of the CHL on August 5, 2014. Upon the merge of the CHL into the ECHL, Fata opted to retire from professional hockey and accepted a General Manager role with the Batchewana Attack in the Canadian International Hockey League.

== Career statistics ==
			Regular season					Playoffs
Season	Team	League	GP	G	A	Pts	PIM	GP	G	A	Pts	PIM
1998–99	St. Thomas Stars	WOHL	44	6	14	20	55	5	0	0	0	2
1999–2000	St. Michael's Buzzers	OPJHL	49	9	18	27	144	—	—	—	—	—
2000–01	Toronto St. Michael's Majors	OHL	58	5	15	20	134	18	1	3	4	26
2001–02	Toronto St. Michael's Majors	OHL	67	7	21	28	175	15	1	9	10	38
2002–03	Toronto St. Michael's Majors	OHL	35	6	13	19	66	—	—	—	—	—
2002–03	Kingston Frontenacs	OHL	34	2	17	19	64	—	—	—	—	—
2003–04	Wilkes–Barre/Scranton Penguins	AHL	23	1	2	3	26	—	—	—	—	—
2003–04	Wheeling Nailers	ECHL	28	6	10	16	61	4	0	0	0	8
2004–05	Wheeling Nailers	ECHL	22	0	1	1	55	—	—	—	—	—
2004–05	Wilkes–Barre/Scranton Penguins	AHL	32	1	1	2	88	5	0	1	1	37
2005–06	Wheeling Nailers	ECHL	34	10	8	18	145	—	—	—	—	—
2005–06	Wilkes–Barre/Scranton Penguins	AHL	28	1	12	13	98	11	0	0	0	16
2006–07	Bridgeport Sound Tigers	AHL	64	3	7	10	185	—	—	—	—	—
2006–07	New York Islanders	NHL	3	1	0	1	5	1	0	0	0	0
2007–08	Bridgeport Sound Tigers	AHL	71	3	11	14	197	—	—	—	—	—
2007–08	New York Islanders	NHL	5	0	1	1	4	—	—	—	—	—
2008–09	San Antonio Rampage	AHL	7	0	0	0	6	—	—	—	—	—
2008–09	Binghamton Senators	AHL	68	7	9	16	135	—	—	—	—	—
2009–10	Providence Bruins	AHL	27	1	3	4	47	—	—	—	—	—
2010–11	Wilkes–Barre/Scranton Penguins	AHL	1	0	0	0	2	—	—	—	—	—
2010–11	Sparta Warriors	NOR	24	2	7	9	47	14	0	2	2	38
2011–12	HC Asiago	ITA	42	3	11	14	58	4	0	0	0	8
2012–13	Sheffield Steelers	EIHL	51	8	19	27	121	2	1	0	1	2
2013–14	Sheffield Steelers	EIHL	50	9	14	23	95	4	1	0	1	8
AHL totals			321	17	45	62	784	16	0	1	1	53
NHL totals			8	1	1	2	9	1	0	0	0	0
