= Patrick DesRochers =

Canadian ice hockey player (born 1979)

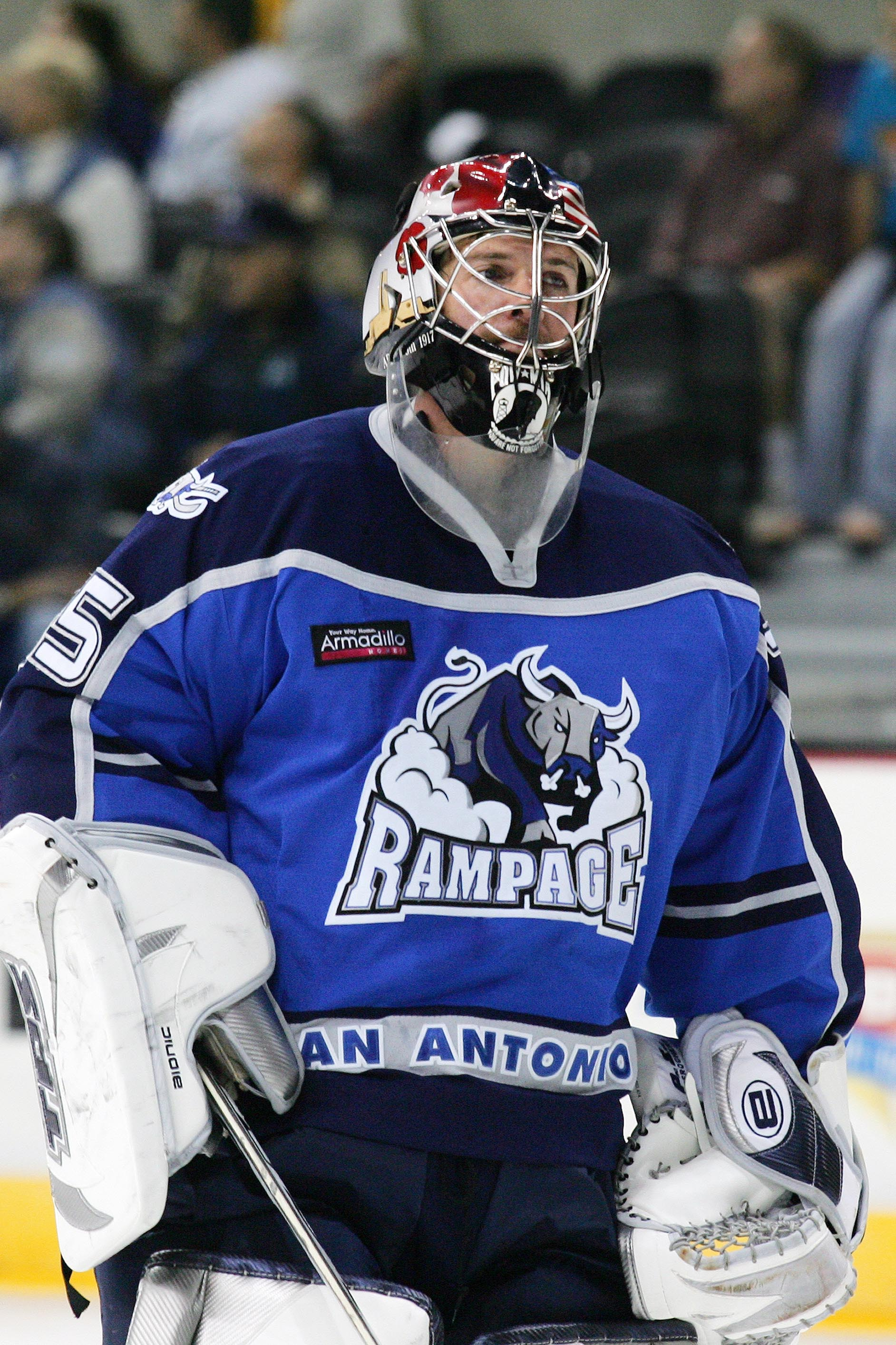
- DesRochers with the San Antonio Rampage in 2004
- Born: 27 October 1979 (age 47) Penetanguishene, Ontario, Canada
- Height: 6 ft 3 in (191 cm)
- Weight: 209 lb (95 kg; 14 st 13 lb)
- Position: Goaltender
- Caught: Left
- Played for: Phoenix Coyotes; Carolina Hurricanes; ETC Crimmitschau; Augsburger Panther; Vålerenga; Dornbirner EC
- NHL draft: 14th overall, 1998; Phoenix Coyotes
- Playing career: 1999–2013

Patrick Joseph DesRochers (born 27 October 1979) is a Canadian former professional ice hockey goaltender. He played 11 games in the National Hockey League (NHL) with the Phoenix Coyotes and Carolina Hurricanes between 2001 and 2003. The rest of his career, which lasted from 1999 to 2013, was spent in the minor leagues or in Europe.

== Playing career ==
He played junior hockey for the Sarnia Sting and Kingston Frontenacs of the Ontario Hockey League.

DesRochers played briefly for both the Phoenix Coyotes and Carolina Hurricanes of the NHL, but spent most of his professional career in the AHL with the Springfield Falcons (for whom he is the career leader among goaltenders in games played), Lowell Lock Monsters and San Antonio Rampage.

DesRochers went to Europe before the 2006–07 season, signing with ETC Crimmitschau. He spent 2007-08 with the Augsburger Panther of the Deutsche Eishockey Liga but became a free agent after the club decided to sign a German goalie. On 12 April 2008, he was presented as the new goaltender of Norwegian team Vålerenga.

== Career statistics ==
=== Regular season and playoffs ===
			Regular season									Playoffs
Season	Team	League	GP	W	L	T	MIN	GA	SO	GAA	SV%	GP	W	L	MIN	GA	SO	GAA	SV%
1994–95	Barrie Colts	OPJHL	26	—	—	—	3205	179	3	3.08	—	—	—	—	—	—	—	—	—
1995–96	Sarnia Sting	OHL	29	12	6	2	1265	96	0	4.55	.878	3	0	1	71	5	0	4.23	—
1996–97	Sarnia Sting	OHL	50	22	17	4	2667	154	4	3.46	.896	11	6	5	576	42	0	4.38	—
1997–98	Sarnia Sting	OHL	56	26	17	11	3205	179	1	3.35	.901	4	1	2	160	12	0	4.50	.888
1998–99	Sarnia Sting	OHL	8	3	5	0	425	26	0	3.67	.878	—	—	—	—	—	—	—	—
1998–99	Kingston Frontenacs	OHL	44	14	22	3	2389	177	1	4.45	.893	5	1	4	323	21	0	3.90	.908
1998–99	Canadian National Team	Intl	1	1	0	0	60	4	0	4.00	—	—	—	—	—	—	—	—	—
1999–00	Springfield Falcons	AHL	52	21	17	7	2710	137	1	3.03	.907	2	1	1	120	7	1	3.50	.865
2000–01	Springfield Falcons	AHL	50	17	24	5	2807	156	0	3.33	.893	—	—	—	—	—	—	—	—
2001–02	Phoenix Coyotes	NHL	5	1	2	1	243	15	0	3.71	.848	—	—	—	—	—	—	—	—
2001–02	Springfield Falcons	AHL	34	12	18	1	1864	94	2	3.03	.905	—	—	—	—	—	—	—	—
2002–03	Phoenix Coyotes	NHL	4	0	3	0	175	11	0	3.77	.875	—	—	—	—	—	—	—	—
2002–03	Springfield Falcons	AHL	8	2	4	1	454	20	0	2.64	.917	—	—	—	—	—	—	—	—
2002–03	Carolina Hurricanes	NHL	2	1	1	0	122	7	0	3.44	.901	—	—	—	—	—	—	—	—
2002–03	Lowell Lock Monsters	AHL	17	4	12	1	1030	48	0	2.80	.912	—	—	—	—	—	—	—	—
2003–04	Lowell Lock Monsters	AHL	50	23	25	1	2838	138	0	2.92	.907	—	—	—	—	—	—	—	—
2004–05	San Antonio Rampage	AHL	34	8	19	1	1487	79	2	3.19	.885	—	—	—	—	—	—	—	—
2004–05	Texas Wildcatters	ECHL	2	0	2	0	120	10	0	5.00	.884	—	—	—	—	—	—	—	—
2006–07	ETC Crimmitschau	GER-2	46	—	—	—	—	—	0	3.37	.920	—	—	—	—	—	—	—	—
2007–08	Augsburg Panthers	DEL	56	16	28	0	3339	178	4	3.20	.901	—	—	—	—	—	—	—	—
2008–09	Vålerenga	NOR	44	—	—	—	—	—	—	2.02	.915	17	—	—	—	—	—	1.73	.928
2009–10	Vålerenga	NOR	47	—	—	—	—	—	—	2.10	.917	16	—	—	—	—	—	1.93	.919
2010–11	Vålerenga	NOR	45	—	—	—	—	—	—	1.93	.922	5	—	—	—	—	—	3.10	.874
2011–12	Vålerenga	NOR	44	—	—	—	—	—	—	2.79	.893	13	—	—	—	—	—	2.01	.935
2012–13	Dornbirner EC	EBEL	49	18	30	0	—	—	1	3.63	.907	—	—	—	—	—	—	—	—
NHL totals			11	2	6	1	541	33	0	3.67	.872	—	—	—	—	—	—	—	—

Awards and achievements
Preceded by Daniel Brière	Phoenix Coyotes first-round draft pick 1998	Succeeded by Scott Kelman
