= Michael Brandasu =

Dutch ice hockey player

- Born: May 9, 1986 Stavanger, Norway
- Position: Defence
- Shot: Right
- Played for: Stavanger Oilers; Viking; Amager Ishockey
- National team: Netherlands
- Playing career: 2004–2013

Michael Brandasu (born 5 September 1986 in Netherlands) is a retired Dutch ice hockey player, who played most of his career as a defender for the Stavanger Oilers.

Michael Brandasu also played for Viking, the Danish club Amager Ishockey and the Dutch U20- and U18-national teams.
