= Amager Ishockey =

Amager Islanders
- City: Amager, Denmark
- League: 1.Division
- Founded: 1964
- Home arena: Kastrup Skøjtehal (capacity: 1405)
- Head coach: Mats Gustavsson
- Website: www.amagerislanders.dk

Franchise history
- 2009 - 2016: Amager Ishockey
- 2016 - present: Amager Islanders

Amager Islanders is an ice hockey team in Amager, Denmark. Islanders play in the second best league in Denmark, 1.Division. They were founded in 1964 and has home ice in Kastrup Skøjtehal in Amager, Copenhagen. Amager have been in the top Danish Icehockey league once, but was relegated same.

== History ==
The team has frequently participated in the Danish Cup since the 2006-07 season, mostly recently competing in the 2010-11 season. They have never made it out of the first round of the competition.

In 2016 Amager Ishockey changed its name to Amager Islanders. It was to mark the beginning of a new era in Amager IK history.
