= Petteri Lotila =

Finnish-born Norwegian ice hockey player

- Born: 24 March 1978 (age 48) Rauma, Finland
- Height: 5 ft 9 in (175 cm)
- Weight: 187 lb (85 kg; 13 st 5 lb)
- Position: Winger
- Shot: Left
- Played for: Lukko; Stavanger Oilers; Manchester Phoenix
- Playing career: 1993–2011

Petteri Lotila (born 24 March 1978) is a Finnish-born Norwegian former professional ice hockey player.

== Career ==
Lotila began his career as a young centre with the junior team of his local organisation, Lukko Rauma. Lotila started with a solid season, although he was not a regular player—in 12 games, he scored 6 points.

As he rose through the ranks at Lukko, his production was steady and he proved to be a hard working, physical centreman. Lotila twice played in the post-season for the junior teams, in the 1996/97 season and the 1997/98 season. His promotion to the senior team, playing in the SM-Liiga would come in time for the 1999/2000 season, and although scoring just 2 points in 48 games, his effort was recognised as he finished the season with a plus/minus rating of plus 5.

The following season, Lotila would move to play for Uusikaupunki Jää-Kotkat in the Mestis. Mestis is the second division of Finnish ice hockey and the highest level which can be reached through playing merit as the SM-Liiga was closed to any new teams entering in 2000. Lotila did not really settle though, and played just 7 games for his new team before returning to Lukko. He would stay for the rest of the season, as well as the season after (2001/02) and again would be a regular player for the side.

In 2002/03, Lotila again ventured into the Mestis, signing for Hokki Kajaani but he would play just twice before returning to Uusikaupunki Jää-Kotkat for his second spell. It would again be a brief experience, and Lotila moved to sign for the Stavanger Oilers of Norway, where he would end the season. Lotila initially re-signed for Lukko for the 2003/04 season, but prior to the season starting chose to move to England to play for the newly formed Manchester Phoenix under head coach Rick Brebant.

Lotila quickly established himself as a regular starter for the Phoenix and amassed 49 regular season EIHL appearances, scoring 17 points in the process. He helped the Phoenix into the post-season, playing 6 games before their season was brought to a close. Due to financial problems, the Phoenix franchise was temporarily suspended in 2004 which meant Lotila had to move again. He would return to Norway and the Stavanger Oilers.

Since starting his second spell with the Oilers in 2004, Lotila has been a reliable and regular starter for the team. His work rate and defensive style have been utilised well in the four seasons he has spent with Stavanger, and Lotila has also helped out with 41 points in that time. Lotila continued to play for the Oilers until retiring in 2011.

== Career statistics ==
			Regular season					Playoffs				
Season	Team	League	GP	G	A	Pts	PIM	GP	G	A	Pts	PIM
1993–94	Lukko Rauma	Jr. C SM-sarja	12	2	4	6	12	-	-	-	-	-
1995–96	Lukko Rauma	Jr. B SM-sarja	29	13	6	19	12	-	-	-	-	-
1996–97	Lukko Rauma	Jr. A SM-Liiga	8	0	0	0	2	14	0	2	2	2
1997–98	Lukko Rauma	Jr. A SM-Liiga	21	3	1	4	50	14	1	0	1	12
1998–99	Lukko Rauma	Jr. A SM-Liiga	34	8	5	13	10	-	-	-	-	-
1999–00	Lukko Rauma	SM-Liiga	48	1	1	2	29	-	-	-	-	-
2000–01	Uusikaupunki Jää-Kotkat	Mestis	7	3	0	3	2	-	-	-	-	-
2000–01	Lukko Rauma	SM-Liiga	42	3	1	4	4	2	0	0	0	0
2001–02	Lukko Rauma	SM-Liiga	20	0	0	0	4	-	-	-	-	-
2002–03	Hokki Kajaani	Mestis	2	0	0	0	0	-	-	-	-	-
2002–03	Uusikaupunki Jää-Kotkat	Mestis	3	0	1	1	0	-	-	-	-	-
2002–03	Stavanger Oilers	NOR 1. divisjon	24	8	6	14	0	-	-	-	-	-
2003–04	Lukko Rauma	SM-Liiga	0	0	0	0	0	-	-	-	-	-
2003–04	Manchester Phoenix	EIHL	49	7	10	17	12	6	1	3	4	6
2004–05	Stavanger Oilers	GET-Ligaen	32	6	5	11	57	3	0	0	0	0
2005–06	Stavanger Oilers	GET-Ligaen	39	6	3	9	54	9	0	0	0	8
2006–07	Stavanger Oilers-2	NOR 1. divisjon	1	0	0	0	2	-	-	-	-	-
2006–07	Stavanger Oilers	GET-Ligaen	25	4	6	10	24	12	1	0	1	2
2007–08	Stavanger Oilers	GET-Ligaen	41	7	4	11	50	2	0	0	0	4
2008–09	Stavanger Oilers	GET-Ligaen	42	4	10	14	46	-	-	-	-	-
