= Peter Lorentzen =

Norwegian ice hockey player

- Born: September 2, 1983 (age 41); Fredrikstad, NOR
- Height: 6 ft 0 in (183 cm)
- Weight: 191 lb (87 kg; 13 st 9 lb)
- Position: Left wing/Right Wing
- Caught: Left
- Played for: Stavanger Oilers (GET); Stjernen (GET); I.K. Comet (GET); Rögle BK (SEL)
- National team: Norway
- Playing career: 2000–2019

Peter Lorentzen (born September 2, 1983) is a retired Norwegian professional ice hockey player, who spent most of the career with the Stavanger Oilers in the Norwegian GET-league. He participated at the 2009-, 2010- and 2011 IIHF World Championships as a member of the Norway men's national ice hockey team.
