= Peter Nylander =

Swedish professional ice hockey forward (born 1976)

- Born: 20 January 1976 (age 50) Stockholm, Sweden
- Height: 5 ft 11 in (180 cm)
- Weight: 198 lb (90 kg; 14 st 2 lb)
- Position: Winger
- Shot: Left
- SEL team Former teams: Timrå IK; JYP (SM-liiga); Brynäs IF; VIK Västerås HK; SKA St. Petersburg (RSL); Mora IK; SaiPa (SM-liiga); Amur Khabarovsk (RSL); Amur Khabarovsk (KHL)
- Playing career: 1996–2014

Peter Nylander (born 20 January 1976) is a Swedish former professional ice hockey forward. He is the younger brother of Michael Nylander and uncle of William and Alexander Nylander.

Nylander has played in his native Elitserien, the Finnish SM-liiga, the Russian league RSL and the KHL. He represented Amur Khabarovsk in Russia from the 2007–08 season until December 2009 and is now back in Sweden playing with Timrå IK for the remainder of 2009–10. In January 2012, he signed for Coventry Blaze of the UK Elite League.

== Career statistics ==
			Regular Season					Playoffs
Season	Team	League	GP	G	A	Pts	PIM	GP	G	A	Pts	PIM
1996–97	JYP	SM-liiga	47	5	11	16	10	4	0	0	0	6
1997–98	Brynäs IF	SEL	46	4	5	9	12	3	1	0	1	0
1998–99	Brynäs IF	SEL	48	4	7	11	8	13	0	1	1	29
1999–00	Västerås IK	SEL	50	4	6	10	32	--	--	--	--	--
2000–01	Augusta Lynx	ECHL	26	3	3	6	4	--	--	--	--	--
2000–01	SKA St. Petersburg	RSL	8	3	0	3	6	--	--	--	--	--
2001–02	SKA St. Petersburg	RSL	46	6	6	12	18	--	--	--	--	--
2002–03	Brynäs IF	SEL	50	8	6	14	26	--	--	--	--	--
2003–04	Brynäs IF	SEL	49	9	8	17	18	--	--	--	--	--
2004–05	Mora IK	SEL	49	2	9	11	12	--	--	--	--	--
2005–06	SaiPa	SM-liiga	56	6	9	15	50	8	2	3	5	2
2006–07	Timrå IK	SEL	42	10	1	11	32	7	0	2	2	4
2007–08	Amur Khabarovsk	RSL	35	10	6	16	30	4	0	2	2	2
2008–09	Amur Khabarovsk	KHL	49	11	7	18	24	--	--	--	--	--
RSL Totals			89	19	12	31	54	4	0	2	2	2
KHL Totals			49	11	7	18	24	--	--	--	--	--
SEL Totals			334	41	42	83	140	23	1	3	4	33
SM-liiga Totals			103	11	20	31	60	12	2	3	5	8
