= Cleve Kinley =

Canadian ice hockey player

- Born: January 3, 1984 (age 41); Surrey, British Columbia, Canada
- Height: 6 ft 0 in (183 cm)
- Weight: 190 lb (86 kg; 13 st 8 lb)
- Position: Defence
- Shoots: Right
- GET-ligaen team Former teams: Stavanger Oilers; Wheeling Nailers; Florida Everblades; Stockton Thunder; Springfield Falcons; Texas Wildcatters; Muskegon Fury; Grand Rapids Griffins; UMass Lowell; Powell River Kings
- National team: Canada
- NHL draft: Undrafted
- Playing career: 2000–present

Cleve Kinley (born January 3, 1984) is a Canadian professional ice hockey defenceman in the Norwegian GET-ligaen.

== Awards and honors ==
Award	Year
All-Hockey East Rookie Team	2003–04
