= Gusten Törnqvist =

Swedish ice hockey player

- Born: June 27, 1982 (age 42); Luleå, Sweden
- Height: 5 ft 8 in (173 cm)
- Weight: 179 lb (81 kg; 12 st 11 lb)
- Position: Goaltender
- Caught: Left
- Played for: Luleå HF; Frölunda HC
- Playing career: 2003–2012

Gusten Axel Stefansson Törnqvist (born June 27, 1982) is a retired Swedish professional ice hockey goaltender.

== Playing career ==
Törnqvist played junior hockey for his hometown team Luleå HF. For the 2002–03 season Törnqvist was brought up to Luleå's Elitserien team where he served as backup to Daniel Henriksson. He made his debut in Elitserien the following season on October 9, 2003, when Luleå defeated Modo Hockey 3–2 in a shootout. Due to recurring problems with knees and hips Törnqvist retired from ice hockey after the 2011–12 season. His last team was Asplöven HC who advanced to the Swedish second league the following season.
