= Jonathan Boutin =

Canadian-German ice hockey player

- Born: March 28, 1985 (age 41) Granby, Quebec, Canada
- Height: 6 ft 2 in (188 cm)
- Weight: 206 lb (93 kg; 14 st 10 lb)
- Position: Goaltender
- Caught: Right
- Played for: Springfield Falcons; Norfolk Admirals; Manitoba Moose; Lillehammer IK; Augsburger Panther
- NHL draft: 96th overall, 2003; Tampa Bay Lightning
- Playing career: 2005–2019

Jonathan Boutin (born March 28, 1985) is a German-Canadian former professional ice hockey goaltender. He was originally drafted in the third round, 96th overall, by the Tampa Bay Lightning in the 2003 NHL entry draft. Boutin was born in Granby, Quebec, and was granted German citizenship in May 2016.

== Playing career ==
=== QMJHL ===
Between 2001 and 2005 Boutin played for Halifax Mooseheads, PEI Rocket, and Quebec Ramparts, all of the QMJHL. In 130 regular season games, Boutin went 58-43-7 with a 3.03 GAA. He also accumulated 31 penalty minutes during his time in the QMJHL. Boutin also played in 62 playoff games. Boutin assisted on two goals during his time in junior hockey. His only regular season assist came as a member of the Halifax Mooseheads, and his lone postseason assist came during his final season of juniors as a member of the Quebec Remparts.

=== AHL and ECHL ===
During the 05–06 season Boutin played for the Springfield Falcons of the AHL for most of the time. He made 22 appearances with Springfield, going 8-12-2 with a GAA of 3.13 and accumulating 4 PIMs along with one assist. Boutin also spent time with the Johnstown Chiefs. He played in 19 games, going 8-9-2 with a 2.93 GAA. He also played in 3 playoff games.

Boutin spent most of the 2006–2007 with the Springfield Falcons. During his stay in Springfield, Boutin had a GAA of 3.29 with 9 wins, 17 losses, and 1 tie in 37 games. In this season he also got 1 assist. He also spent 2 games with the Johnstown Chiefs of the ECHL, where he went 0–2 with a GAA of 3.07.

During the 2007–2008 season Boutin played in Norfolk, VA with the Norfolk Admirals of the AHL. He played in 38 games and got 25 penalty minutes. He played a total of 2070 minutes in an Admirals jersey that season. Boutin had 13 wins, 17 losses, and 3 OTL). He held a 3.31 GAA and a .900 save percentage. During a game against the Worcester Sharks, Boutin got into a fight with former Sharks prospect Thomas Greiss.

=== Europe ===
Boutin played for the Lausitzer Füchse, a professional team in Germany's 2nd Bundesliga in the 2009–10 season and received Goalie of the Year honors. He then signed for Lillehammer Ishockeyklubb, a club based in the town of Lillehammer, playing in GET-ligaen - the premier Norwegian ice hockey league governed by the Norwegian Ice Hockey Federation. He appeared in 41 games for Lillehammer in 2010-11 and moved back to Lausitzer Füchse for the following season, where he played until the end of the 2014–15 season. In 2012 and 2013 he repeated as 2nd Bundesliga Goalie of the Year.

In October 2015, Boutin inked a deal with another club from Germany's second division, EHC Freiburg, for the remainder of the 2015-16 campaign. Boutin was granted German citizenship on May 24, 2016, and signed with Augsburger Panther of the country's top-tier Deutsche Eishockey Liga (DEL) the same day.

After two seasons in the DEL with Augsburger, Boutin returned to the DEL2 as a free agent, agreeing to a one-year deal with EC Bad Nauheim on March 28, 2018.
