= Justin Bostrom =

American professional ice hockey forward

- Born: 20 March 1986 (age 40) Vadnais Heights, Minnesota, USA
- Height: 5 ft 11 in (180 cm)
- Weight: 196 lb (89 kg; 14 st 0 lb)
- Position: Forward
- Shot: Right
- Played for: Düsseldorfer EG; Lillehammer IK; Manglerud Star
- Playing career: 2009–2015

Justin Bostrom (born 20 March 1986 in Vadnais Heights, Minnesota) is an American former professional ice hockey forward.

== Career ==
On 13 August 2009, he signed a one-year contract with GET-ligaen team Manglerud Star. On April 27, 2010, he signed for Lillehammer IK in the same league. In July 2012 he signed a try-out contract with Düsseldorfer EG in the German DEL.
