= Lukas David =

Austrian violinist (1934–2021)

Lukas Florian David (5 June 1934 – 11 October 2021) was an Austrian classical violinist.

== Life ==
David was born in Wels upper Austria in 1934 as the younger son of the composer and conductor Johann Nepomuk David (1895–1977) and his wife Berta Eybl. His older brother was the composer and conductor Thomas Christian David (1925–2006). He received his first violin lessons at the University of Music and Theatre Leipzig. Later he was a student of Max Strub at the Mozarteum University Salzburg and of Max Kergl at the State University of Music and Performing Arts Stuttgart. He had his first public performance at the age of 14. From 1949 to 1957, he studied in the master class of Tibor Varga and was his assistant at the Hochschule für Musik Detmold until 1959. He also attended a master class with Nathan Milstein.

As a violinist he gained international recognition; concert tours took him through Europe, to Asia, the US, South America and South Africa. The main focus of his work is the romantic and contemporary repertoire, so he also performed several of his father's solo concertos. In the Peruvian capital Lima he organised the annual Lukas David Chamber Music Festival. In 1958, he received the Förderpreis des Landes Nordrhein-Westfalen für junge Künstlerinnen und Künstler.

From 1959, David led a main subject class at the University of Music and Performing Arts Vienna. From 1966 to 1998 he was professor at the Hochschule für Musik Detmold.

David died on 11 October 2021 in Lemgo, Germany.
