= Dion Knelsen =

Canadian ice hockey player

- Born: January 4, 1989 (age 37) High Level, Alberta, Canada
- Height: 5 ft 9 in (175 cm)
- Weight: 181 lb (82 kg; 12 st 13 lb)
- Position: Centre
- Shoots: Left
- SL team Former teams: EHC Olten; ECHL; Alaska Aces; Allsvenskan; Mora IK; Asplöven HC; GET-ligaen; Sparta Warriors; National League / Swiss League; SC Rapperswil-Jona Lakers
- NHL draft: Undrafted
- Playing career: 2010–present

Dion Knelsen (born January 4, 1989) is a Canadian professional ice hockey player who is currently playing with EHC Olten of the Swiss League (SL).

== Career ==
Knelsen attended the University of Alaska-Fairbanks from 2006 to 2010 and turned pro in March 2010, when signing with the Peoria Rivermen of the American Hockey League (AHL), who sent him to their ECHL affiliate, the Alaska Aces. After logging his first minutes as a professional ice hockey player in the ECHL, Knelsen opted to head to Norway for the 2010-11 season, landing a job with the Sparta Warriors. He quickly proved his scoring touch in Norway, recording 31 goals (plus 39 assists) in 59 contests en route to winning the championship.

Knelsen moved to Sweden for his second year in Europe, joining HockeyAllsvenskan team Mora IK, where he spent the 2011-12 campaign, totaling 17 goals and 19 assists in 51 games. He transferred to fellow HockeyAllsvenskan side Asplöven HC prior to the 2012-13 season.

In April 2013, he returned for a second stint with the Sparta Warriors. He spent three more years with the team, lighting up the league in scoring with his best output coming in the 2015-16 season when he produced a league-best 34 goals in 50 contests. His scoring prowess drew the attention of other teams around Europe and Knelsen eventually penned a deal with Swiss NLB team SC Rapperswil-Jona Lakers in April 2016.

== Family ==
His older brother Brandon (born July 24, 1987) played one game in the ECHL with the Idaho Steelheads during the 2009–10 ECHL season.

Awards and achievements
Preceded by Jeff Lerg; Jerad Kaufmann	Ilitch Humanitarian Award; 2009-10	Succeeded by Trevor Nill
Preceded by Jordan Pearce	CCHA Scholar-Athlete of the Year; 2009-10	Succeeded by Carter Camper
