= Teemu Virtala =

Finnish ice hockey player

- Born: August 17, 1983 (age 43) Uusikaupunki, Finland
- Height: 5 ft 8 in (173 cm)
- Weight: 163 lb (74 kg; 11 st 9 lb)
- Position: Centre
- Shot: Left
- Played for: KalPa; HC Innsbruck; Stavanger Oilers; Kazzinc-Torpedo; Arlan Kokshetau; Gentofte Stars; HC Pustertal; Rødovre Mighty Bulls; SV Kaltern
- Current AlpsHL coach: Ritten Sport
- Coached for: SV Kaltern
- NHL draft: Undrafted
- Playing career: 2002–2024

Teemu Virtala (born August 17, 1983) is a Finnish ice hockey coach and former player. He is currently head coach of Ritten Sport, Italian team of the Alps Hockey League.

Virtala played with KalPa in the Finish SM-liiga during the 2007–08 and 2008–09 seasons. In 2014 he joined Kazzinc-Torpedo and a year later was transferred to Arlan Kokshetau.

In the last career years as a player Virtala was active in the Metal Ligaen with Gentofte Stars (2016–2018) and Rødovre Mighty Bulls (2019–2020), in the Alps Hockey League with HC Val Pusteria (2018–2019) and in the Italian Hockey League with SV Kaltern (2020–2024).

During the last two years he spent playing for Kaltern, Virtala served as a player-assistant coach, and after retiring, he was promoted to head coach. During two seasons, the team won two championships (2024-2025 and 2025–2026) and a Coppa Italia (2025–2026).

In May 2026 he was appointed head coach of Ritten Sport.
