= Evan Cheverie =

Canadian ice hockey player

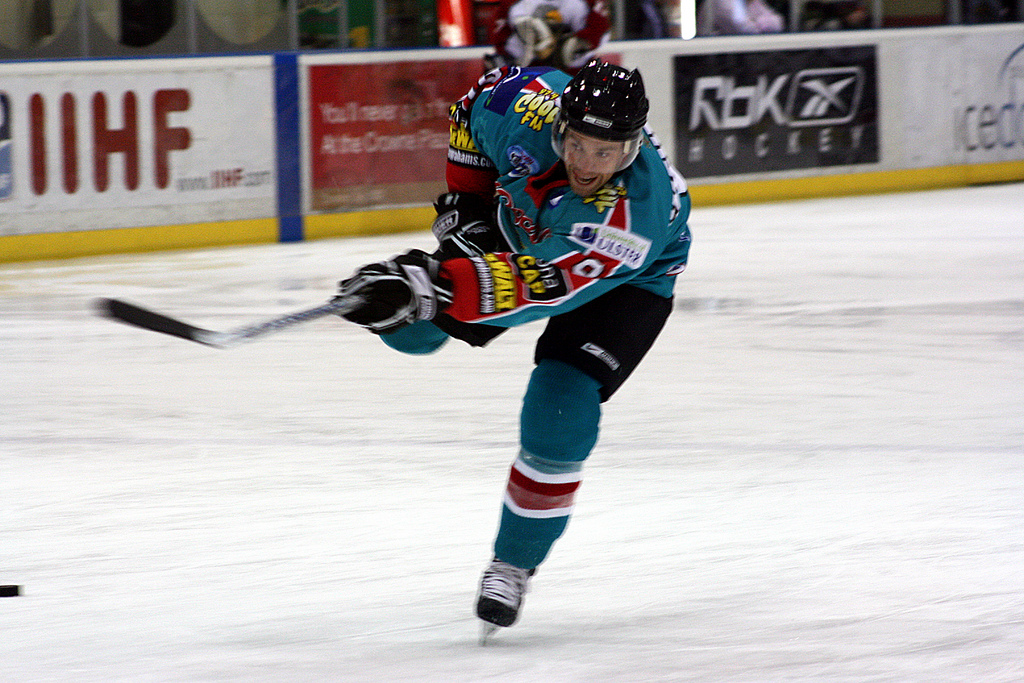
- Born: May 6, 1980 (age 46) Charlottetown, PEI, Canada
- Height: 6 ft 0 in (183 cm)
- Weight: 200 lb (91 kg; 14 st 4 lb)
- Position: Forward
- Shot: Left
- Played for: Bridgeport Sound Tigers; Coventry Blaze; Pingouins de Morzine-Avoriaz; Vålerenga; Belfast Giants; Lillehammer IK
- NHL draft: Undrafted
- Playing career: 2002–2016

Evan Cheverie (born May 6, 1980) is a Canadian retired professional ice hockey forward.

== Playing career ==
Cheverie was born in Charlottetown, Prince Edward Island. Undrafted, Cheverie spent four seasons at Miami University before turning professional in 2002 with the ECHL's Cincinnati Cyclones. He also had spells in the American Hockey League (AHL) with the Bridgeport Sound Tigers and the United Hockey League (UHL) with the Columbus Stars before returning to the ECHL with the Long Beach Ice Dogs in 2004. His performances of 29 goals and 68 points in 72 games helped him become an ECHL All-Star.

In 2005, Cheverie moved to the United Kingdom, signing with the Coventry Blaze, scoring 20 goals and 52 points, playing mostly as a defenceman to cover for injuries. His outstanding performances earned him a place in the First Team Elite League All-Star selection team. Cheverie then moved to France playing for Pingouins de Morzine-Avoriaz and then in Norway for Vålerenga where he continued to produce impressive numbers. In 2008, Cheverie returned to the United Kingdom, signing with the Belfast Giants, reuniting with Stevie Lyle, who were teammates in France.

On June 6, 2010, he signed for Lillehammer IK in Get-Ligaen for the 2010–11 season. Cheverie returned to Belfast during the 2013 offseason.

== Personal ==
His younger brother, Marc was also a professional hockey Goaltender, who was drafted by the Florida Panthers and played in the AHL.
