= Tobias Lindström =

Swedish-Norwegian ice hockey player

- Born: 20 April 1988 (age 36); Stockholm, Sweden
- Height: 5 ft 10 in (178 cm)
- Weight: 203 lb (92 kg; 14 st 7 lb)
- Position: Center
- Shoots: Right
- GET team Former teams: Frisk Asker Ishockey; Djurgårdens IF; Lørenskog IK; Vålerenga Ishockey
- National team: Norway
- Playing career: 2007–present

Tobias Lindström (born 20 April 1988) is a Swedish-Norwegian professional ice hockey player who is currently playing for Frisk Asker Ishockey in Fjordkraftligaen. He was born in Stockholm and formerly represented Sweden on junior level national teams, before switching to the Norwegian national team in 2018.

Lindström was selected to compete at the 2018 World Championships as a member of the Norway men's national ice hockey team.
