= Phil Osaer =

American ice hockey player

- Born: 10 February 1980 (age 46) Livonia, Michigan, U.S.
- Height: 6 ft 0 in (183 cm)
- Weight: 190 lb (86 kg; 13 st 8 lb)
- Position: Goaltender
- Caught: Left
- Played for: Worcester IceCats; Hartford Wolf Pack; San Antonio Rampage; Rochester Americans; Cardiff Devils; Sparta Warriors; Lørenskog IK
- NHL draft: 203rd overall, 1999; St. Louis Blues
- Playing career: 2001–2013

Phil Osaer (born 10 February 1980 in Livonia, Michigan) is an American former professional ice hockey goaltender, who played in the North American minor leagues before moving to partake a career abroad in Norway and Britain.

== Playing career ==
In the 1999 NHL entry draft, Osaer was selected by St. Louis Blues in the seventh round, as the 203rd overall pick.

In April 2007, Osaer turned down a substantial offer from a Norwegian ice hockey club to stay with Cardiff Devils. However, on April 9, 2008, he decided to quit Cardiff for GET-ligaen team Sparta Warriors. Osaer returned to the Devils for the 2012-13 season before concluding his career with Lørenskog IK in Norway.

== Awards and honours ==
Award	Year
All-CCHA Second Team	2000-01
