= 2008–09 GET-ligaen season =

- League: GET-ligaen
- Sport: Ice hockey
- Number of teams: 10
- Regular-season winner: Sparta Warriors
- Champions: Vålerenga Ishockey

GET-ligaen seasons
- ← 2007-08 season 2009-10 season →

The 2008–09 GET-ligaen season began on 18 September 2008 and ended 22 February 2009.

== Regular season ==
=== Final standings ===
#	GET-ligaen	GP	W	L	T	OTW	OTL	GF	GA	PTS
1	Sparta Warriors (C)	45	28	10	7	4	3	172	101	95
2	Vålerenga^{1}	45	28	11	6	2	4	180	95	89
3	Lillehammer	45	23	13	9	8	1	159	106	86
4	Stavanger Oilers	45	26	15	4	2	2	148	117	84
5	Storhamar Dragons	45	19	19	7	2	5	137	121	66
6	Stjernen^{2}	45	24	15	6	2	4	166	143	65
7	Frisk Tigers	45	14	19	12	8	4	129	144	62
8	Lørenskog	45	16	20	9	3	6	142	155	60
9	Comet^{2}	45	9	31	5	2	3	100	174	24
10	Furuset^{2}	45	3	37	5	2	3	79	256	6

GP = Games played; W = Wins; L = Losses; T = Ties; OTW = Overtime Wins; OTL = Overtime losses; GF = Goals for; GA = Goals against; PTS = Points
Source: PointStreak.com
^{1} Vålerenga got deducted 3 points due to unsportsmanlike misconduct by Vålerenga GM Jan Tore Kjær after a match against league winners Sparta Warriors on 5 October 2008.
^{2} Due to poor economy; Stjernen got deducted 15 points, while Furuset and Comet got deducted 10 points.

=== Statistics ===
==== Scoring leaders ====
Player	Team	GP	G	A	Pts	+/–	PIM
(Sweden) Henric Höglund	Stjernen	45	36	33	69	+27	89
(Sweden) Henrik Malmström	Sparta Warriors	42	25	37	62	+20	26
(Finland) Tomi Pöllänen	Lillehammer	42	28	29	57	+16	85
(Canada) Tim Konsorada	Lillehammer	44	27	29	56	+26	16
(Norway) Jonas Solberg Andersen	Sparta Warriors	42	18	37	55	+21	30
(Canada) Blake Evans	Vålerenga	44	24	30	54	+28	76
(Canada) Yvan Busque	Lørenskog	43	20	34	54	+9	120
(Canada) Brendan Brooks	Stavanger Oilers	45	24	28	52	+6	66
(Sweden) Johan Olsson	Stjernen	43	9	42	51	+28	18
(Sweden) Alexander Larsson	Frisk Tigers	43	22	28	50	+2	73
(Canada) Elias Godoy	Frisk Tigers	43	16	34	50	-17	155

GP = Games played; G = Goals; A = Assists; Pts = Points; +/– = Plus/minus; PIM = Penalty minutes

==== Leading goaltenders ====
Player	Team	GP	Min	W	L	GA	SO	Sv%	GAA
(Canada) Patrick DesRochers	Vålerenga	44	2,640	28	15	89	5	91.5	2.02
(United States) Phil Osaer	Sparta Warriors	42	2,518	26	12	89	6	91.7	2.12
(Sweden) David Rautio	Lillehammer	32	1,952	17	10	75	2	92.5	2.30
(Norway) Ruben Smith	Storhamar Dragons	33	1,893	13	17	74	4	92.2	2.34
(Norway) André Lysenstøen	Stavanger Oilers	32	1,805	20	12	80	1	90.5	2.66

GP = Games played; Min = Minutes played; W = Wins; L = Losses; GA = Goals against; SO = Shutouts; Sv% = Save percentage; GAA = Goals against average

==== Attendance ====
10 Teams	Regular Season	Playoffs				Total
10 Teams	Regular Season	Quarterfinale	Semifinale	Finale	Total Playoffs	Total
Games	225	22	10	6	38	263
Attendance	309,371	34,061	18,373	22,560	74,994	384,365
Average Attendance	1,375	1,548	1,837	3,760	1,974	1,461

== Playoffs ==
Quarterfinals
1	Sparta Warriors	4
8	Lørenskog	1
4	Stavanger Oilers	2
5	Storhamar Dragons	4
2	Vålerenga	4
7	Frisk Tigers	1
3	Lillehammer	2
6	Stjernen	4

Semifinals
1	Sparta Warriors	4
5	Storhamar Dragons	0
2	Vålerenga	4
6	Stjernen	2

Finals
1	Sparta Warriors	2
2	Vålerenga	4

Norwegian Champions
2008–09
Vålerenga Ishockey
26th title

== Promotion/Relegation ==
#	GET-ligaen	GP	W	L	T	OTW	OTL	GF	GA	PTS
1	Comet (P)	6	6	0	0	0	0	33	12	18
2	Manglerud Star (P)	6	4	2	0	0	0	33	19	12
3	Kongsvinger Knights	6	1	5	0	0	0	17	33	3
4	Furuset	6	1	5	0	0	0	13	32	3

GP = Games played; W = Wins; L = Losses; T = Ties; OTW = Overtime Wins; OTL = Overtime losses; GF = Goals for; GA = Goals against; PTS = Points
Source: hockey.no
