= 2011–12 GET-ligaen season =

- League: GET-ligaen
- Sport: Ice hockey
- Duration: 10 September 2011–13 April 2012
- Number of games: 263
- Number of teams: 10
- TV partner(s): TV 2 Sport

Regular season
- League champions: Stavanger Oilers
- Season MVP: Ryan MacMurchy
- Top scorer: Ryan MacMurchy

Playoffs
- Norwegian champions: Stavanger Oilers
- Playoffs MVP: Lars-Peder Nagel

GET-ligaen seasons
- ← 2010–11 2012–13 →

The 2011–12 GET-ligaen was the 73rd season of Norway's premier ice hockey league, Eliteserien (known as GET-ligaen for sponsorship reasons).

The season began on 10 September 2011 with the final round of the regular season played on 1 March 2012. The Stavanger Oilers won their first league championship after beating Frisk Asker on 2 February 2012. With a total of 112 points, the Oilers broke the previous record of 108 points held by the Sparta Warriors (2011) and Storhamar Dragons (2006). Lørenskog finished as runners-up ahead of Vålerenga.

The playoffs to determine the 2012 Norwegian champions began on 4 March 2012 and ended on 13 April 2012. Stavanger defeated Lørenskog by 4 games to 2 in the finals to claim their second Norwegian Championship title in three seasons. The playoffs were contested by the top eight teams in the regular season.

Qualification for the final two berths in the 2012–13 GET-ligaen was held between 8 March and 24 March 2012. The Tønsberg Vikings won the tournament and gained promotion to the GET-ligaen for the first time in the team's history. Frisk Asker secured the runner-up spot and continued play at the top level; Manglerud Star was relegated to the 1. divisjon.

Overall attendance surpassed 400,000 for the first time in league history.

== Regular season ==
=== Final standings ===
Team	GP	W	OTW/SOW	OTL/SOL	L	GF	GA	Pts
Stavanger Oilers	45	35	3	1	6	216	100	112
Lørenskog	45	30	3	1	11	190	102	91
Vålerenga	45	28	1	2	14	209	131	88
Lillehammer	45	26	1	5	13	168	106	85
Sparta Warriors	45	22	5	2	16	166	112	75
Storhamar Dragons	45	20	2	4	19	148	146	71
Stjernen	45	16	1	2	26	114	167	55
Rosenborg	45	14	3	1	27	113	165	52
Manglerud Star	45	7	2	2	34	84	202	27
Frisk Asker	45	5	1	2	37	78	255	19

Source: pointstreak.com

=== Scoring leaders ===
These were the top ten skaters based on points. If the list exceeds ten skaters because of a tie in points, all of the tied skaters are shown.

Player	Team	GP	G	A	Pts	+/–	PIM
(Canada) Ryan MacMurchy	Stavanger Oilers	44	37	39	76	+25	138
(Sweden) Martin Strandfeldt	Stavanger Oilers	45	34	36	70	+35	76
(Canada) Shay Stephenson	Vålerenga	44	28	42	70	+28	163
(Norway) Knut Henrik Spets	Lørenskog	45	22	44	66	+23	32
(United States) Gino Guyer	Lillehammer	45	22	36	58	+34	16
(Canada) Kenny Corupe	Lørenskog	45	22	33	55	+30	70
(Norway) Mats Frøshaug	Lørenskog	43	26	27	53	+26	24
(United States) R. J. Anderson	Lillehammer	45	19	34	53	+28	62
(Norway) Lars Erik Spets	Lørenskog	43	17	36	53	+27	48
(Sweden) Henrik Malmström	Sparta Warriors	45	19	33	52	+9	50
(Canada) Patrick Coulombe	Vålerenga	44	17	35	52	+26	58
(Canada) Blake Evans	Vålerenga	45	15	37	52	+29	72
(United States) Tim Kunes	Stavanger Oilers	45	11	41	52	+35	34

=== Leading goaltenders ===
These were the top five goaltenders based on goals against average.

Player	Team	GP	TOI	W	L	GA	SO	Sv%	GAA
(Austria) Jürgen Penker	Lørenskog	22	1299:47	17	5	43	3	.924	1.98
(Canada) Ryan Nie	Lillehammer	45	2691:04	27	18	100	6	.917	2.23
(Norway) Ruben Smith	Stavanger Oilers	34	1922:40	28	6	72	3	.918	2.25
(United States) Phil Osaer	Sparta Warriors	44	2584:24	26	18	101	5	.916	2.34
(Sweden) Simon Nordh	Rosenborg	34	1973:34	15	18	90	6	.916	2.74

=== Attendance ===
Team	Arena	Capacity	Total	Games	Average	% of Capacity
Frisk Tigers	Askerhallen	2,400	17,075	23	742	30.9%
Storhamar Dragons	Hamar OL-Amfi	6,091	49,988	23	2,173	35.7%
Vålerenga	Jordal Amfi	4,450	36,071	22	1,639	36.8%
Lillehammer	Kristins Hall	3,194	33,475	22	1,521	47.6%
Rosenborg	Leangen Ishall	3,000	32,372	23	1,407	46.9%
Lørenskog	Lørenskog Ishall	1,350	21,252	22	966	71.6%
Manglerud Star	Manglerudhallen	2,000	7,953	23	345	17.3%
Stavanger Oilers	Siddishallen	2,664	45,399	22	2,063	77.4%
Sparta Warriors	Sparta Amfi	3,450	55,733	22	2,533	73.4%
Stjernen	Stjernehallen	2,473	28,341	23	1,232	49.8%

Total	Games	Average
327,659	225	1,456

Source:pointstreak.com

== Playoffs ==
After the regular season, the standard of eight teams qualified for the playoffs. In the first and second rounds, the highest remaining seed chooses which of the two lowest remaining seeds to be matched against. In each round the higher-seeded team is awarded home ice advantage. Each best-of-seven series follows a 1–1–1–1–1–1–1 format: the higher-seeded team plays at home for games 1 and 3 (plus 5 and 7 if necessary), and the lower-seeded team at home for games 2, 4 and 6 (if necessary).

=== Bracket ===
Quarter-finals
1	Stavanger Oilers	4
8	Rosenborg	0
2	Lørenskog	4
7	Stjernen	0
(Pairings are reseeded after the first round)
3	Vålerenga	4
6	Storhamar Dragons	3
4	Lillehammer	4
5	Sparta Warriors	3

Semi-finals
1	Stavanger Oilers	4
4	Lillehammer	0
2	Lørenskog	4
3	Vålerenga	2

Finals
1	Stavanger Oilers	4
2	Lørenskog	2

Source: pointstreak.com

Norwegian Champions
2012
Stavanger Oilers
2nd title

=== Game log ===
2012 Norwegian Ice Hockey Championship Game Log
Quarter-finals

(1) Stavanger Oilers vs. (8) Rosenborg

4 March 2012; 17:00 CET	Stavanger Oilers	9–1 (3–1, 2–0, 4–0)	Rosenborg	Siddishallen, Stavanger; Attendance: 1,512

Game reference

Ruben Smith
Goalies
Simon Nordh (out 18:25)
Andreas Mundal Micka (in 18:25)
Referees:
Lasse Westby
Petter Hegle

Kilpatrick (MacMurchy) – 0:33	1 – 0
David (Trettenes, Sveum) (PP) – 10:09	2 – 0
	2 – 1	11:17 – Stokvik (Wiig, Erbe)
Sveum (Imbeault, Kilpatrick) – 15:40	3 – 1
Strandfeldt (MacMurchy, Nagel) (PP) – 30:01	4 – 1
Dahl Andersen (Strandfeldt, Nagel) – 34:20	5 – 1
Dahl Andersen (Kunes, MacMurchy) (PP) – 43:50	6 – 1
Imbeault (Johnson, Hjelm) – 44:40	7 – 1
Nagel (MacMurchy, Kilpatrick) (PP) – 51:28	8 – 1
Strandfeldt (Kunes, Kaunismäki) – 55:59	9 – 1

14 min
Penalties
20 min
56
Shots
21

6 March 2012; 18:00 CET	Rosenborg	2–6 (0–2, 1–2, 1–2)	Stavanger Oilers	Leangen Ishall, Trondheim; Attendance: 1,257

Game reference

Andreas Mundal Micka
Goalies
Ruben Smith
Referees:
Petter Hegle
Lasse Westby

	0 – 1	1:48 – Imbeault (Åsland, Kinley)
	0 – 2	10:15 – Strandfeldt (Dahl Andersen, Nagel)
	0 – 3	20:12 – Strandfeldt (Dahl Andersen, Kunes) (PP2)
	0 – 4	26:34 – N. David (Grafsrønningen, Kaunismäki)
Wiig (Stokvik, V. Spets) (PP) – 30:49	1 – 4
	1 – 5	40:48 – MacMurchy (Kunes, Kilpatrick) (PP2)
	1 – 6	44:18 – Kinley (Høygård, Kilpatrick) (PP)
Juell (Erbe, Berk) (PP) – 58:08	2 – 6

38 min
Penalties
28 min
26
Shots
43

8 March 2012; 18:00 CET	Stavanger Oilers	10–1 (1–0, 4–0, 5–1)	Rosenborg	Siddishallen, Stavanger; Attendance: 1,614

Game reference

Ruben Smith
Goalies
Andreas Mundal Micka
Referees:
Lasse Westby
Petter Hegle

Dahl Andersen (Strandfeldt, Nagel) – 9:29	1 – 0
Strandfeldt (Grafsrønningen, Sveum) – 22:01	2 – 0
Kilpatrick (MacMurchy, Lorentzen) – 25:38	3 – 0
MacMurchy (Kilpatrick, Lorentzen) – 25:49	4 – 0
Johnson (Trettenes, Høygård) – 39:45	5 – 0
	5 – 1	54:15 – Stokvik (Nielsen, Erbe)
Johnson – 46:14	6 – 1
Johnson (Kaunismäki, Høygård) – 51:28	7 – 1
MacMurchy (Nagel, Kunes) (SH) – 54:34	8 – 1
Nagel (Kilpatrick, MacMurchy) (PP2) – 57:54	9 – 1
Høygård (Imbeault, Kilpatrick) (PP) – 59:09	10 – 1

30 min
Penalties
18 min
43
Shots
26

10 March 2012; 16:00 CET	Rosenborg	1–7 (0–4, 0–2, 1–1)	Stavanger Oilers	Leangen Ishall, Trondheim; Attendance: 1,003

Game reference

Andreas Mundal Micka
Goalies
Henrik Holm
Referees:
Hans Petter Berg
Robert Hallin

	0 – 1	1:02 – Strandfeldt (Dahl Andersen, Kinley)
	0 – 2	10:18 – Imbeault (Høygård, Kilpatrick) (PP)
	0 – 3	11:07 – N. David (Sveum, Kinley)
	0 – 4	13:07 – Boxill (Nagel, Strandfeldt)
	0 – 5	21:14 – Dahl Andersen (Kinley, Nagel)
	0 – 6	37:10 – Høygård (Imbeault, Kilpatrick) (PP)
	0 – 7	54:26 – Åsland (Imbeault)
Berk (Wiig, V. Spets) (PP) – 58:15	1 – 7

10 min
Penalties
12 min
27
Shots
43

Stavanger won series 4–0

(2) Lørenskog vs. (7) Stjernen

4 March 2012; 17:00 CET	Lørenskog	7–0 (4–0, 2–0, 1–0)	Stjernen	Lørenskog Ishall, Lørenskog; Attendance: 770

Game reference

Jürgen Penker
Goalies
Christoffer Bengtsberg
Referees:
Eirik Hansen
Robert Hallin

Marius Trygg (Frøshaug, Bryhnisveen) – 3:44	1 – 0
Corupe (Mathias Trygg, Messa) – 4:03	2 – 0
Thygesen (K.H. Spets, Sundelius) – 6:45	3 – 0
Thygesen (Bryhnisveen) – 11:48	4 – 0
Thygesen (K.H. Spets, Ericson) (PP) – 30:45	5 – 0
Ylven (Sixsmith, Messa) (PP2) – 37:55	6 – 0
Sixsmith (Marius Trygg, Tønseth) – 47:41	7 – 0

34 min
Penalties
53 min
47
Shots
25

6 March 2012; 18:30 CET	Stjernen	1–4 (0–1, 0–2, 1–1)	Lørenskog	Stjernehallen, Fredrikstad; Attendance: 1,269

Game reference

Christoffer Bengtsberg
Goalies
Jürgen Penker
Referees:
Eirik Hansen
Robert Hallin

	0 – 1	9:21 – Sixsmith (Ericson, Marius Trygg) (PP)
	0 – 2	22:10 – Frøshaug (Jakobsen, Penker) (PP)
	0 – 3	22:53 – Frøshaug (Marius Trygg, Sixsmith)
Gustafsson (Paulsen) – 47:16	1 – 3
	1 – 4	57:25 – Corupe (L.E. Spets) (EN)

10 min
Penalties
14 min
24
Shots
26

8 March 2012; 18:30 CET	Lørenskog	6–3 (2–2, 3–1, 1–0)	Stjernen	Lørenskog Ishall, Lørenskog; Attendance: 847

Game reference

Jürgen Penker
Goalies
Pål Grotnes
Referees:
Eirik Hansen
Robert Hallin

	0 – 1	4:36 – Gustafsson (Macijevskis, Olsen)
L.E. Spets (Jakobsen, K.H. Spets) (PP) – 10:38	1 – 1
	1 – 2	11:53 – Håland (Macijevskis, Gustafsson)
Sundelius – 19:00	2 – 2
Marius Trygg (Messa, Sixsmith) (PP) – 20:49	3 – 2
Corupe (K.H. Spets, Jakobsen) – 29:50	4 – 2
	4 – 3	33:25 – Hermansson (Gabrielsen, Macijevskis)
Corupe (Ericson, Mathias Trygg) – 33:42	5 – 3
Raboin (Sixsmith, Jakobsen) – 46:45	6 – 3

18 min
Penalties
18 min
54
Shots
30

10 March 2012; 16:00 CET	Stjernen	0–2 (0–0, 0–2, 0–0)	Lørenskog	Stjernehallen, Fredrikstad; Attendance: 721

Game reference
Christoffer Bengtsberg	Goalies	Jürgen Penker	Referees: Eirik Hansen; Petter Hegle
0 – 1 / 21:33 – Frøshaug (Messa, Sixsmith); 0 – 2 / 26:00 – Sixsmith (Frøshaug, Ericson) (PP)			Referees: Eirik Hansen; Petter Hegle
55 min	Penalties	50 min	Referees: Eirik Hansen; Petter Hegle
19	Shots	32	Referees: Eirik Hansen; Petter Hegle

Lørenskog won series 4–0

(3) Vålerenga vs. (6) Storhamar Dragons

4 March 2012; 17:00 CET	Vålerenga	2–3 (1–0, 0–1, 1–2)	Storhamar Dragons	Jordal Amfi, Oslo; Attendance: 1,587

Game reference

Patrick DesRochers
Goalies
Tommy Johansen
Referees:
Per Gustav Solem
Ole Stian Hansen

Coulombe (Cocozza) – 2:57	1 – 0
	1 – 1	26:19 – Jensen (Johnsen, Larrivée) (PP2)
	1 – 2	44:15 – Østli (Johnsen, Martz) (PP)
	1 – 3	45:09 – Huse (Larrivée, Lystad Jacobsen)
Evans (Csisar) – 56:37	2 – 3

12 min
Penalties
10 min
29
Shots
25

6 March 2012; 18:30 CET	Storhamar Dragons	4–3 (1–2, 0–0, 3–1)	Vålerenga	Hamar OL-Amfi, Hamar; Attendance: 2,247

Game reference

Tommy Johansen
Goalies
Patrick DesRochers
Referees:
Ole Stian Hansen
Per Gustav Solem

Jensen (Martz, Johnsen) – 4:32	1 – 0
	1 – 1	5:25 – Hoel (Cocozza)
	1 – 2	14:37 – Cocozza (Hoel, Hollstedt)
Østli (Andersson, Larrivée) (PP) – 46:32	2 – 2
Jacobsen (Martz, Larrivée) (PP) – 52:41	3 – 2
Larrivée (Huse) – 54:16	4 – 2
	4 – 3	56:37 – Evans (Coulombe)

4 min
Penalties
12 min
24
Shots
42

8 March 2012; 18:30 CET	Vålerenga	4–1 (1–0, 1–0, 2–1)	Storhamar Dragons	Jordal Amfi, Oslo; Attendance: 1,901

Game reference

Patrick DesRochers
Goalies
Tommy Johansen
Referees:
Ole Stian Hansen
Per Gustav Solem

Sørvik (Csisar) (PP) – 14:11	1 – 0
Hoff – 28:20	2 – 0
Evans (Oppøyen, Sørvik) – 44:17	3 – 0
	3 – 1	46:45 – Martz (Østli, Jensen)
Hoel (Coulombe) – 48:44	4 – 1

14 min
Penalties
26 min
35
Shots
23

10 March 2012; 16:00 CET	Storhamar Dragons	1–5 (0–1, 1–1, 0–3)	Vålerenga	Hamar OL-Amfi, Hamar; Attendance: 2,458

Game reference

Tommy Johansen
Goalies
Patrick DesRochers
Referees:
Ole Stian Hansen
Per Gustav Solem

	0 – 1	19:19 – S. Stephenson (Evans, Oppøyen)
Nicolaisen (Østli, Salsten) – 23:30	1 – 1
	1 – 2	29:41 – Oppøyen (PS)
	1 – 3	44:33 – Csisar (Larsen, Brekke)
	1 – 4	49:44 – Hollstedt (Cocozza, Jørgensen)
	1 – 5	55:39 – S. Stephenson (L. Stephenson, Evans)

55 min
Penalties
8 min
33
Shots
36

12 March 2012; 19:00 CET	Vålerenga	3–1 (1–1, 0–0, 2–0)	Storhamar Dragons	Jordal Amfi, Oslo; Attendance: 2,473

Game reference

Patrick DesRochers
Goalies
Tommy Johansen
Referees:
Ole Stian Hansen
Owe Lüthcke

	0 – 1	3:37 – Larrivée
Oppøyen (Csisar, Thoresen) – 12:16	1 – 1
Hollstedt (Cocozza, Coulombe) – 40:48	2 – 1
Cocozza (Hoel, L. Stephenson) (EN) – 59:53	3 – 1

12 min
Penalties
48 min
26
Shots
22

14 March 2012; 19:00 CET	Storhamar Dragons	2–1 (1–0, 1–1, 0–0)	Vålerenga	Hamar OL-Amfi, Hamar; Attendance: 2,704

Game reference

Tommy Johansen
Goalies
Patrick DesRochers
Referees:
Petter Hegle
Tor Olav Johnsen

Larrivée (Martz, Johnsen (PP) – 3:36	1 – 0
Jensen (Martz, Larrivée) – 27:11	2 – 0
	2 – 1	37:28 – Thoresen (Coulombe, L. Stephenson) (PP2)

28 min
Penalties
28 min
28
Shots
38

16 March 2012; 19:00 CET	Vålerenga	3–1 (0–0, 0–1, 3–0)	Storhamar Dragons	Jordal Amfi, Oslo; Attendance: 5,058

Game reference

Patrick DesRochers
Goalies
Tommy Johansen
Referees:
Tor Olav Johnsen
Petter Hegle

	0 – 1	29:59 – Paulsen (Øksnes, Johnsen)
S. Stephenson (Sørvik) – 40:33	1 – 1
Hoel (Cocozza, Hollstedt) – 53:33	2 – 1
Thoresen (Coulombe) (EN) – 59:39	3 – 1

6 min
Penalties
10 min
26
Shots
19

Vålerenga won series 4–3

(4) Lillehammer vs. (5) Sparta Warriors

4 March 2012; 17:00 CET	Lillehammer	1–2 (0–1, 1–0, 0–1)	Sparta Warriors	Kristins Hall, Lillehammer; Attendance: 1,485

Game reference

Ryan Nie
Goalies
Phil Osaer
Referees:
Tor Olav Johnsen
Owe Lüthcke

	0 – 1	2:01 – Witnes (Stene, Tengvert)
Bäärnhielm (Reichenberg, Cheverie) – 20:45	1 – 1
	1 – 2	51:20 – Roest (Solberg Andersen, Bovim)

10 min
Penalties
14 min
23
Shots
21

6 March 2012; 18:30 CET	Sparta Warriors	3 – 4 (OT) (1–2, 0–1, 2–0, 0–1)	Lillehammer	Sparta Amfi, Sarpsborg; Attendance: 1,999

Game reference

Phil Osaer
Goalies
Ryan Nie
Referees:
Tor Olav Johnsen
Owe Lüthcke

Olimb (Olsson, Buck) (PP) – 8:07	1 – 0
	1 – 1	15:58 – Morrison (Bäärnhielm, Anderson) (PP)
	1 – 2	19:59 – Sjödin
	1 – 3	21:38 – Nygård (Bakken, Eidsæther)
Malmström (Ødegaard) – 41:02	2 – 3
Hesbråten (Weberg, Olimb) – 43:01	3 – 3
	3 – 4	69:34 – Bäärnhielm

14 min
Penalties
20 min
34
Shots
36

8 March 2012; 18:30 CET	Lillehammer	4–3 (1–0, 1–2, 2–1)	Sparta Warriors	Kristins Hall, Lillehammer; Attendance: 1,553

Game reference

Ryan Nie
Goalies
Phil Osaer
Referees:
Tor Olav Johnsen
Owe Lüthcke

H. Medby (E. Medby, Nie) – 12:53	1 – 0
	1 – 1	22:57 – Malmström
Guyer (Bostrom, Wehrs) – 27:14	2 – 1
	2 – 2	30:53 – Bergström (Olsson, Buck)
	2 – 3	41:17 – Bergström (Buck, Henriksen)
Bäärnhielm (Reichenberg, Andersen) (PP) – 42:50	3 – 3
Martinsen (Reichenberg, Anderson) – 56:51	4 – 3

8 min
Penalties
10 min
26
Shots
30

10 March 2012; 16:00 CET	Sparta Warriors	5–2 (3–1, 1–1, 1–0)	Lillehammer	Sparta Amfi, Sarpsborg; Attendance: 2,221

Game reference

Phil Osaer
Goalies
Ryan Nie
Referees:
Tor Olav Johnsen
Owe Lüthcke

Roest (Andersen) – 5:47	1 – 0
Olsson (Bovim, Olimb) (PP) – 8:30	2 – 0
Osaer – 16:52	3 – 0
	3 – 1	18:55 – Morrison (Wehrs) (PP)
	3 – 2	29:04 – Sjödin (Wehrs) (PP)
Buck (Tengvert, Olsson) – 31:35	4 – 2
Elofsson (Witnes) (PP) – 51:27	5 – 2

14 min
Penalties
16 min
37
Shots
25

12 March 2012; 19:00 CET	Lillehammer	4–2 (0–0, 1–1, 3–1)	Sparta Warriors	Kristins Hall, Lillehammer; Attendance: 1,636

Game reference

Ryan Nie
Goalies
Phil Osaer
Referees:
Tor Olav Johnsen
Per Gustav Solem

	0 – 1	28:44 – Buck (Olimb, Bovim) (PP)
Bostrom (Sjödin) – 32:20	1 – 1
Morrison (Anderson, Guyer) – 46:29	2 – 1
Rindal (Eidsæther, Nygård) – 47:33	3 – 1
Martinsen (Wehrs, Cheverie) (PP) – 55:38	4 – 1
	4 – 2	58:51 – Buck

10 min
Penalties
20 min
31
Shots
16

14 March 2012; 19:00 CET	Sparta Warriors	4–3 (1–0, 1–2, 2–1)	Lillehammer	Sparta Amfi, Sarpsborg; Attendance: 2,101

Game reference

Phil Osaer
Goalies
Ryan Nie
Referees:
Per Gustav Solem
Robert Hallin

Malmström (Witnes, Bovim) – 9:45	1 – 0
	1 – 1	20:56 – Bostrom (Cheverie)
	1 – 2	27:10 – Rindal (Wehrs, Guyer)
Elofsson (Witnes, Andersen) (PP2) – 38:17	2 – 2
Roest (Malmström) – 49:20	3 – 2
Malmström – 55:45	4 – 2
	4 – 3	58:43 – Bostrom (Anderson, Bäärnhielm)

12 min
Penalties
18 min
29
Shots
33

16 March 2012; 18:30 CET	Lillehammer	3–0 (1–0, 2–0, 0–0)	Sparta Warriors	Kristins Hall, Lillehammer; Attendance: 2,201

Game reference

Ryan Nie
Goalies
Phil Osaer
Referees:
Robert Hallin
Per Gustav Solem

Morrison (Guyer, Bostrom) – 0:54	1 – 0
Morrison (Bostrom, Anderson) (PP) – 26:54	2 – 0
Anderson (Guyer, Morrison) (PP) – 30:52	3 – 0

24 min
Penalties
32 min
25
Shots
36

Lillehammer won series 4–3

Semi-finals

(1) Stavanger Oilers vs. (4) Lillehammer

18 March 2012; 17:00 CET	Stavanger Oilers	3–0 (0–0, 1–0, 2–0)	Lillehammer	Siddishallen, Stavanger; Attendance: 1,768

Game reference

Ruben Smith
Goalies
Ryan Nie
Referees:
Petter Hegle
Per Gustav Solem

Strandfeldt (Kunes, Dahl Andersen) (PP) – 36:14	1 – 0
Strandfeldt (Nagel, Dahl Andersen) (PP) – 57:12	2 – 0
MacMurchy (Kilpatrick) (EN) – 58:54	3 – 0

12 min
Penalties
14 min
36
Shots
25

20 March 2012; 19:00 CET	Lillehammer	4 – 5 (OT) (2–1, 2–3, 0–0, 0–1)	Stavanger Oilers	Kristins Hall, Lillehammer; Attendance: 1,911

Game reference

Ryan Nie
Goalies
Ruben Smith
Referees:
Tor Olav Johnsen
Petter Hegle

Martinsen (Morrison, Rindal) – 0:53	1 – 0
	1 – 1	4:16 – Kilpatrick (Lorentzen, MacMurchy)
Guyer (Bostrom, Anderson) – 8:48	2 – 1
	2 – 2	21:03 – Dahl Andersen (Nagel, Strandfeldt)
Morrison (Anderson, Guyer) – 25:05	3 – 2
	3 – 3	25:42 – Dahl Andersen (Strandfeldt, Kunes)
	3 – 4	33:24 – MacMurchy (Strandfeldt, Kunes) (PP)
Guyer (Bostrom, Anderson) (PP) – 37:38	4 – 4
	4 – 5	63:29 – Strandfeldt (Kilpatrick)

43 min
Penalties
20 min
33
Shots
27

22 March 2012; 19:00 CET	Stavanger Oilers	6–5 (1–1, 4–2, 1–2)	Lillehammer	Siddishallen, Stavanger; Attendance: 1,846

Game reference

Ruben Smith
Goalies
Ryan Nie
Referees:
Petter Hegle
Per Gustav Solem

Imbeault (Grafsrønningen, Lorentzen) – 0:41	1 – 0
	1 – 1	14:41 – Bostrom (Martinsen, Guyer) (PP)
Strandfeldt (Nagel, Dahl Andersen) – 21:15	2 – 1
	2 – 2	24:26 – Wehrs (Eidsæther, Cheverie) (PP)
Imbeault (Dahl Andersen, Johnson) (PP) – 26:56	3 – 2
Dahl Andersen (Strandfeldt, Nagel) – 31:55	4 – 2
	4 – 3	37:41 – Guyer (Anderson, Bostrom)
Strandfeldt (Nagel, Dahl Andersen) (PP) – 39:51	5 – 3
Strandfeldt (Dahl Andersen, Nagel) – 51:30	6 – 3
	6 – 4	54:11 – Cheverie (Martinsen) (PP)
	6 – 5	55:52 – Bäärnhielm (Cheverie, Guyer)

20 min
Penalties
16 min
45
Shots
34

24 March 2012; 16:00 CET	Lillehammer	4–6 (1–1, 3–2, 0–3)	Stavanger Oilers	Kristins Hall, Lillehammer; Attendance: 1,436

Game reference

Ryan Nie
Goalies
Ruben Smith
Referees:
Per Gustav Solem
Petter Hegle

Eidsæther (Hammerseng, Medby) – 6:04	1 – 0
	1 – 1	8:43 – Nagel (Lorentzen, N. David)
Anderson (Guyer) – 21:19	2 – 1
	2 – 2	26:20 – Kunes (Strandfeldt, Dahl Andersen) (PP)
Bäärnhielm (Morrison, Anderson) (PP) – 28:00	3 – 2
Morrison (Bäärnhielm, Anderson) (PP) – 31:03	4 – 2
	4 – 3	37:34 – Johnson (Kinley, Høygård) (PP)
	4 – 4	49:52 – Strandfeldt (N. David, Imbeault)
	4 – 5	54:12 – Høygård (Imbeault, Johnson)
	4 – 6	58:02 – Kunes (Strandfeldt, Nagel)

30 min
Penalties
26 min
34
Shots
29

Stavanger won series 4–0

(2) Lørenskog vs. (3) Vålerenga

18 March 2012; 17:00 CET	Lørenskog	2–4 (1–1, 0–2, 1–1)	Vålerenga	Lørenskog Ishall, Lørenskog; Attendance: 1,730

Game reference
Jürgen Penker	Goalies	Patrick DesRochers	Referees: Owe Lüthcke; Ole Stian Hansen
Corupe (Ylven, Mathias Trygg) – 7:02 Frøshaug (L.E. Spets, Ericson) (PP2) – 57:16 / Goals / 7:56 – Evans (S. Stephenson, Thoresen); 22:59 – Coulombe (Thoresen, L. Stephenson) (PP); 29:53 – Larsen (Oppøyen, Coulombe) (PP); 55:48 – Thoresen (S. Stephenson, L. Stephenson) (PP)			Referees: Owe Lüthcke; Ole Stian Hansen
60 min	Penalties	36 min	Referees: Owe Lüthcke; Ole Stian Hansen
40	Shots	29	Referees: Owe Lüthcke; Ole Stian Hansen

20 March 2012; 19:00 CET	Vålerenga	2–5 (1–1, 0–1, 1–3)	Lørenskog	Jordal Amfi, Oslo; Attendance: 2,569

Game reference

Patrick DesRochers
Goalies
Jürgen Penker
Referees:
Eirik Hansen
Ole Stian Hansen

	0 – 1	3:35 – Marius Trygg (Sixsmith, Messa) (PP)
Oppøyen (Csisar, Sørvik) – 15:48	1 – 1
	1 – 2	22:06 – L.E. Spets (Corupe, K.H. Spets) (PP)
Espeland (Oppøyen, Larsen) (PP) – 47:45	2 – 2
	2 – 3	48:00 – Sixsmith (Messa, Ericson)
	2 – 4	54:01 – Raboin (Messa) (SH)
	2 – 5	59:15 – Messa (SH)(EN)

87 min
Penalties
53 min
18
Shots
31

22 March 2012; 19:00 CET	Lørenskog	1 – 0 (OT) (0–0, 0–0, 0–0, 1–0)	Vålerenga	Lørenskog Ishall, Lørenskog; Attendance: 1,840

Game reference
Jürgen Penker	Goalies	Patrick DesRochers	Referees: Owe Lüthcke; Tor Olav Johnsen
Corupe (K.H. Spets, L.E. Spets) (PP) – 60:36 / 1–0			Referees: Owe Lüthcke; Tor Olav Johnsen
10 min	Penalties	16 min	Referees: Owe Lüthcke; Tor Olav Johnsen
36	Shots	25	Referees: Owe Lüthcke; Tor Olav Johnsen

24 March 2012; 16:00 CET	Vålerenga	3–4 (2–1, 0–1, 1–2)	Lørenskog	Jordal Amfi, Oslo; Attendance: 2,219

Game reference

Patrick DesRochers
Goalies
Jürgen Penker
Referees:
Tor Olav Johnsen
Owe Lüthcke

Hoel (Sørvik, Hollstedt) – 13:51	1 – 0
Hoff (Thoresen, L. Stephenson) (PP) – 18:34	2 – 0
	2 – 1	18:57 – Bryhnisveen (Sixsmith, Marius Trygg)
	2 – 2	39:28 – Ylven (Frøshaug, K.H. Spets)
	2 – 3	41:30 – Mathias Trygg (K.H. Spets, Olsson)
Evans (L. Stephenson, Coulombe) – 46:24	3 – 3
	3 – 4	47:48 – K.H. Spets

6 min
Penalties
22 min
25
Shots
26

26 March 2012; 19:00 CET	Lørenskog	0–2 (0–1, 0–1, 0–0)	Vålerenga	Lørenskog Ishall, Lørenskog; Attendance: 1,890

Game reference
Jürgen Penker	Goalies	Patrick DesRochers	Referees: Owe Lüthcke; Tor Olav Johnsen
0 – 1 / 9:52 – Larsen (Brekke, Oppøyen); 0 – 2 / 20:56 – Oppøyen (SH)			Referees: Owe Lüthcke; Tor Olav Johnsen
8 min	Penalties	14 min	Referees: Owe Lüthcke; Tor Olav Johnsen
48	Shots	21	Referees: Owe Lüthcke; Tor Olav Johnsen

28 March 2012; 19:00 CET	Vålerenga	1 – 2 (OT) (0–1, 1–0, 0–0, 0–1)	Lørenskog	Jordal Amfi, Oslo; Attendance: 2,508

Game reference

Patrick DesRochers
Goalies
Jürgen Penker
Referees:
Tor Olav Johnsen
Owe Lüthcke

	0 – 1	19:21 – Frøshaug (Sixsmith, Ericson) (PP2)
Oppøyen (Larsen, Cocozza) (PP) – 37:36	1 – 1
	1 – 2	62:24 – Corupe (Raboin, K.H. Spets) (PP)

30 min
Penalties
18 min
16
Shots
44

Lørenskog won series 4–2

Finals

(1) Stavanger Oilers vs. (2) Lørenskog

2 April 2012; 19:00 CET	Stavanger Oilers	1–3 (1–1, 0–0, 0–2)	Lørenskog	Siddishallen, Stavanger; Attendance: 2,175

Game reference

Ruben Smith
Goalies
Jürgen Penker
Referees:
Tor Olav Johnsen
Owe Lüthcke

	0 – 1	9:15 – Mathias Trygg (Ylven, Thygesen)
Kilpatrick (PP) – 13:31	1 – 1
	1 – 2	53:07 – Corupe (Ylven, Raboin)
	1 – 3	59:48 – K.H. Spets (Ylven, Sixsmith) (EN)

18 min
Penalties
16 min
30
Shots
27

4 April 2012; 19:00 CET	Lørenskog	3–4 (0–0, 1–1, 2–3)	Stavanger Oilers	Lørenskog Ishall, Lørenskog; Attendance: 2,072

Game reference

Jürgen Penker
Goalies
Ruben Smith
Referees:
Ole Stian Hansen
Per Gustav Solem

Frøshaug (Marius Trygg, Raboin) (PP) – 32:05	1 – 0
	1 – 1	36:32 – Kilpatrick (Kinley)
Corupe (L.E. Spets, Olsson) – 46:02	2 – 1
	2 – 2	52:31 – Kaunismäki (MacMurchy, Kunes)
	2 – 3	55:46 – Nagel (Kunes, Strandfeldt)
	2 – 4	56:20 – Imbeault (Johnson, Grafsrønningen)
L.E. Spets (Sixsmith, Corupe) – 57:15	3 – 4

8 min
Penalties
14 min
31
Shots
32

7 April 2012; 16:00 CET	Stavanger Oilers	8–5 (1–1, 5–3, 2–1)	Lørenskog	Siddishallen, Stavanger; Attendance: 1,948

Game reference

Ruben Smith
Goalies
Jürgen Penker
Referees:
Owe Lüthcke
Per Gustav Solem

	0 – 1	11:14 – Mathias Trygg (Bryhnisveen, Ericson) (PP)
Sveum – 13:09	1 – 1
Strandfeldt (Kinley, Dahl Andersen) – 21:19	2 – 1
	2 – 2	23:05 – Corupe (Raboin, Frøshaug) (PP)
MacMurchy (SH) – 25:52	3 – 2
	3 – 3	26:25 – Frøshaug (L.E. Spets, Corupe) (PP)
Høygård (Grafsrønningen, Kilpatrick) (PP) – 32:29	4 – 3
	4 – 4	33:08 – Ylven (Corupe, Olsson)
Strandfeldt (Nagel) (PP2) – 35:17	5 – 4
MacMurchy (Kaunismäki) (SH) – 39:36	6 – 4
	6 – 5	54:56 – Jakobsen (L.E. Spets)
Kaunismäki (Nagel, Strandfeldt) (SH)(EN) – 58:55	7 – 5
Grafsrønningen (Sveum) (SH)(EN) – 59:12	8 – 5

69 min
Penalties
51 min
36
Shots
39

9 April 2012; 19:00 CET	Lørenskog	3–2 (2–0, 1–1, 0–1)	Stavanger Oilers	Lørenskog Ishall, Lørenskog; Attendance: 2,400

Game reference

Jürgen Penker
Goalies
Ruben Smith
Referees:
Ole Stian Hansen
Tor Olav Johnsen

Ylven (Ericson) – 1:31	1 – 0
Sixsmith (L.E. Spets, Bryhnisveen) (PP) – 5:32	2 – 0
	2 – 1	22:31 – Nagel (Kunes, Strandfeldt) (PP)
Frøshaug (K.H. Spets, Jakobsen) (PP2) – 26:49	3 – 1
	3 – 2	51:32 – MacMurchy (PP)

18 min
Penalties
26 min
37
Shots
30

11 April 2012; 19:00 CET	Stavanger Oilers	4 – 3 (OT) (2–1, 0–1, 1–1, 1–0)	Lørenskog	Siddishallen, Stavanger; Attendance: 2,240

Game reference

Ruben Smith
Goalies
Jürgen Penker
Referees:
Per Gustav Solem
Tor Olav Johnsen

Strandfeldt (Nagel, Dahl Andersen) (PP) – 2:18	1 – 0
Høygård (MacMurchy, Hallem) – 4:14	2 – 0
	2 – 1	15:16 – L.E. Spets (Corupe, Bryhnisveen) (PP)
	2 – 2	34:51 – Jordhøy (Jakobsen, Sundelius)
MacMurchy (Johnson, Kaunismäki) – 53:52	3 – 2
	3 – 3	55:40 – L.E. Spets (Corupe)
Dahl Andersen (Strandfeldt, MacMurchy) (PP) – 70:12	4 – 3

28 min
Penalties
18 min
33
Shots
41

13 April 2012; 19:00 CET	Lørenskog	1–2 (1–0, 0–1, 0–1)	Stavanger Oilers	Lørenskog Ishall, Lørenskog; Attendance: 2,720

Game reference

Jürgen Penker
Goalies
Ruben Smith
Referees:
Tor Olav Johnsen
Per Gustav Solem

Sundelius – 12:21	1 – 0
	1 – 1	28:39 – Strandfeldt (MacMurchy, Nagel) (PP)
	1 – 2	45:32 – Nagel (Kunes, MacMurchy) (PP)

12 min
Penalties
28 min
33
Shots
21

Stavanger won series 4–2

=== Scoring leaders ===
These were the top ten skaters in the playoffs based on points. If the list exceeds ten skaters because of a tie in points, all of the tied skaters are shown.

Player	Team	GP	G	A	Pts	+/–	PIM
(Sweden) Martin Strandfeldt	Stavanger Oilers	14	17	13	30	+14	58
(Norway) Lars-Peder Nagel	Stavanger Oilers	14	6	18	24	+18	16
(Canada) Ryan MacMurchy	Stavanger Oilers	13	9	12	21	+5	38
(Norway) Christian Dahl Andersen	Stavanger Oilers	14	8	12	20	+12	10
(United States) Jimmy Kilpatrick	Stavanger Oilers	12	5	12	17	+4	47
(Canada) Kenny Corupe	Lørenskog	16	10	6	16	+8	18
(United States) James Sixsmith	Lørenskog	16	6	10	16	+3	8
(United States) Tim Kunes	Stavanger Oilers	14	2	12	14	+10	2
(United States) R. J. Anderson	Lillehammer	11	2	12	14	+6	10
(Norway) Mats Frøshaug	Lørenskog	16	8	4	12	+6	18
(Canada) Alex Imbeault	Stavanger Oilers	14	6	6	12	−2	4
(Norway) Lars Erik Spets	Lørenskog	16	5	7	12	−1	24
(United States) Gino Guyer	Lillehammer	11	4	8	12	+6	10

=== Leading goaltenders ===
These were the top five goaltenders in the playoffs based on goals against average.

Player	Team	GP	TOI	W	L	GA	SO	Sv%	GAA
(Canada) Patrick DesRochers	Vålerenga	13	776:21	6	7	26	1	.935	2.01
(Austria) Jürgen Penker	Lørenskog	16	965:18	10	6	35	3	.915	2.18
(Norway) Ruben Smith	Stavanger Oilers	13	791:44	11	6	34	1	.916	2.58
(Norway) Tommy Johansen	Storhamar Dragons	7	418:44	3	4	19	0	.917	2.72
(United States) Phil Osaer	Sparta Warriors	7	423:52	3	4	21	0	.894	2.97

== Qualification ==
After the regular season had ended, the two lowest ranked teams in the league and the two highest ranked teams in the 1. divisjon competed for the right to play in the 2012–13 GET-ligaen. Comet, Frisk Asker, Manglerud Star and the Tønsberg Vikings took part. The tournament was played from 8 March to 24 March 2012 and was organized according to a double round robin format: each club played the others twice, home and away, for a total of six games. The points system and ranking method used were the same as in the GET-ligaen.

Tønsberg won five out of six games, securing promotion in the penultimate round by defeating Frisk Asker 4–3 on penalties. Frisk Asker eventually finished in second place by gaining a 1–0 win in regular time against Manglerud Star in the final round. This meant that the latter team was relegated to the 1. divisjon after three consecutive seasons in the top flight. Comet lost all its games and finished last.

=== Final standings ===
Team	GP	W	OTW/SOW	OTL/SOL	L	GF	GA	Pts
Tønsberg Vikings	6	3	2	1	0	32	17	14
Frisk Asker	6	2	1	3	0	24	18	11
Manglerud Star	6	2	2	0	2	26	14	10
Comet	6	0	0	1	5	13	46	1

Source: hockey.no

=== Game log ===
2012–13 GET-ligaen Qualification Game Log
Rounds 1–6

Round 1

8 March 2012; 18:30 CET	Manglerud Star	3–4 (1–1, 1–1, 1–2)	Tønsberg Vikings	Manglerudhallen, Oslo

Game reference
			Referee: Tommy Søstumoen
12 min	Penalties	14 min	Referee: Tommy Søstumoen
29	Shots	20	Referee: Tommy Søstumoen

8 March 2012; 18:30 CET	Comet	3 – 4 (SO) (2–1, 0–0, 1–2, 0–0, 0/5–1/5)	Frisk Asker	Halden Ishall, Halden; Attendance: 706

Game reference
			Referee: Hans Petter Berg
16 min	Penalties	12 min	Referee: Hans Petter Berg
34	Shots	52	Referee: Hans Petter Berg

Round 2

10 March 2011; 16:00 CET	Comet	2–4 (0–1, 1–1, 1–2)	Manglerud Star	Halden Ishall, Halden; Attendance: 662

Game reference
			Referee: Tommy Søstumoen
12 min	Penalties	8 min	Referee: Tommy Søstumoen
33	Shots	25	Referee: Tommy Søstumoen

10 March 2012; 16:00 CET	Tønsberg Vikings	5 – 4 (SO) (0–1, 3–2, 1–1, 0–0, 3/5–2/5)	Frisk Asker	Tønsberg Ishall, Tønsberg

Game reference
			Referee: Steven Richardson
21 min	Penalties	23 min	Referee: Steven Richardson
41	Shots	35	Referee: Steven Richardson

Round 3

14 March 2012; 18:30 CET	Frisk Asker	2 – 3 (SO) (2–0, 0–0, 0–2, 0–0, 0/3–1/3)	Manglerud Star	Askerhallen, Asker; Attendance: 600

Game reference
			Referee: Tommy Søstumoen
10 min	Penalties	4 min	Referee: Tommy Søstumoen
23	Shots	31	Referee: Tommy Søstumoen

14 March 2012; 18:30 CET	Tønsberg Vikings	12–0 (3–0, 5–0, 4–0)	Comet	Tønsberg Ishall, Tønsberg

Game reference
			Referee: Gudmund Lien
35 min	Penalties	45 min	Referee: Gudmund Lien
52	Shots	13	Referee: Gudmund Lien

Round 4

18 March 2012; 17:00 CET	Tønsberg Vikings	3 – 4 (SO) (1–3, 2–0, 0–0, 0–0, 1/3–2/3)	Manglerud Star	Tønsberg Ishall, Tønsberg; Attendance: 710

Game reference
			Referee: Steven Richardson
4 min	Penalties	12 min	Referee: Steven Richardson
33	Shots	23	Referee: Steven Richardson

18 March 2012; 17:00 CET	Frisk Asker	10–3 (3–2, 4–1, 3–0)	Comet	Askerhallen, Asker; Attendance: 930

Game reference
			Referee: Robert Hallin
8 min	Penalties	14 min	Referee: Robert Hallin
44	Shots	23	Referee: Robert Hallin

Round 5

22 March 2012; 18:30 CET	Manglerud Star	12–2 (4–0, 6–1, 2–0)	Comet	Manglerudhallen, Oslo

Game reference
			Referee: Steven Richardson
6 min	Penalties	14 min	Referee: Steven Richardson
48	Shots	19	Referee: Steven Richardson

22 March 2012; 18:30 CET	Frisk Asker	3 – 4 (SO) (0–2, 2–1, 1–1, 0–0, 2/5–3/5)	Tønsberg Vikings	Askerhallen, Asker; Attendance: 1,211

Game reference
			Referee: Gudmund Lien
6 min	Penalties	18 min	Referee: Gudmund Lien
42	Shots	32	Referee: Gudmund Lien

Round 6

24 March 2012; 16:00 CET	Manglerud Star	0–1 (0–0, 0–0, 0–1)	Frisk Asker	Manglerudhallen, Oslo

Game reference
			Referee: Tommy Søstumoen
14 min	Penalties	6 min	Referee: Tommy Søstumoen
30	Shots	27	Referee: Tommy Søstumoen

24 March 2012; 16:00 CET	Comet	3–4 (1–0, 2–0, 0–4)	Tønsberg Vikings	Halden Ishall, Halden; Attendance: 474

Game reference
			Referee: Eirik Hansen
24 min	Penalties	12 min	Referee: Eirik Hansen
34	Shots	50	Referee: Eirik Hansen

== Awards ==
All-Star team

The following players were selected to the 2011–12 GET-ligaen All-Star team:

- Goaltender: Tommy Johansen (Storhamar)
- Defenseman: Patrick Coulombe (Vålerenga)
- Defenseman: Tim Kunes (Stavanger)
- Center: Mats Frøshaug (Lørenskog)
- Winger: James Sixsmith (Lørenskog)
- Winger: Ryan MacMurchy (Stavanger)

Other

- Player of the year: Ryan MacMurchy (Stavanger)
- Coach of the year: David Livingston (Lørenskog)
- Playoff MVP: Lars-Peder Nagel (Stavanger)
