= Morten Ask =

Norwegian ice hockey player (born 1980)

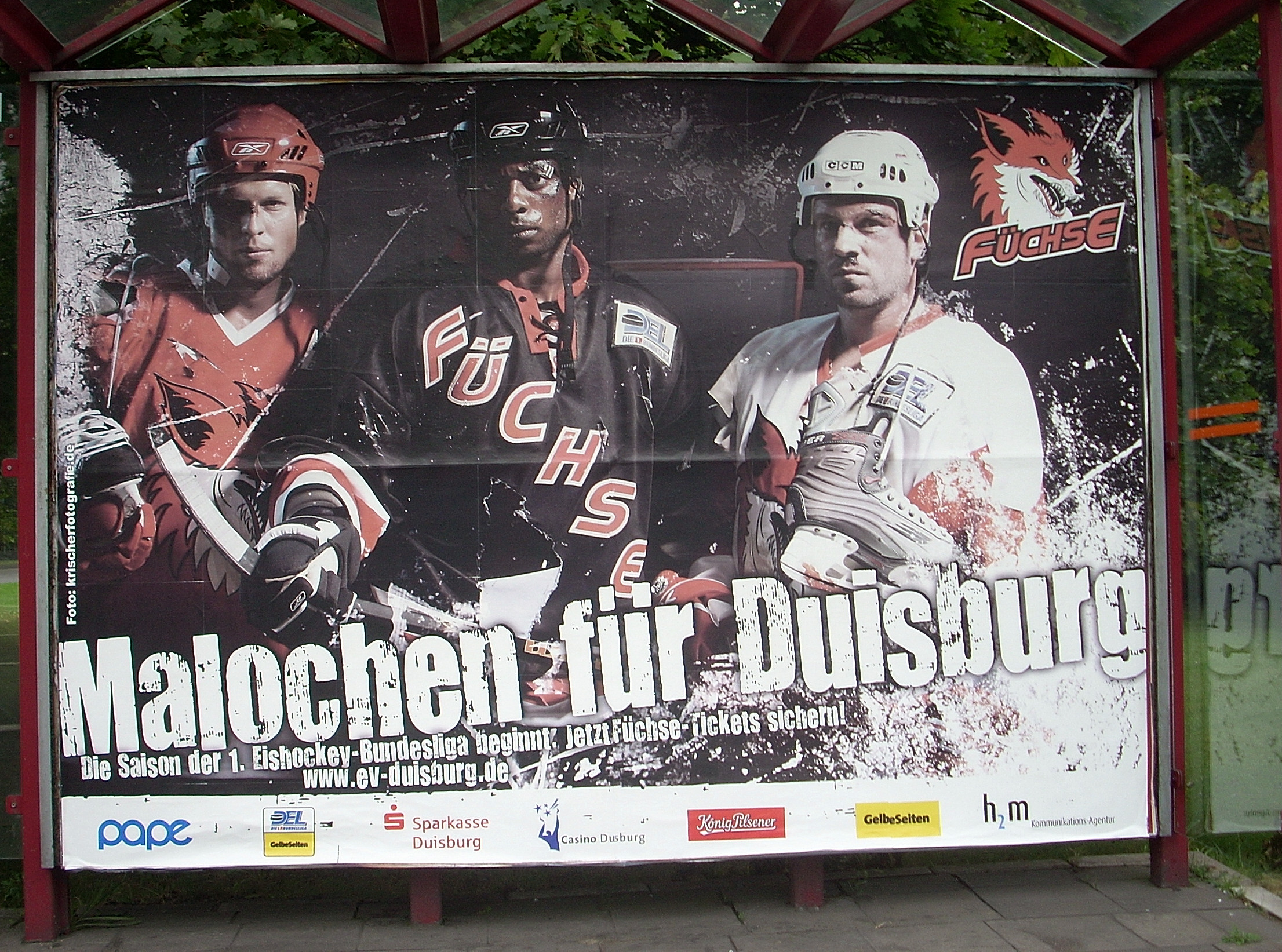
- Malochen für Duisburg
- Born: May 14, 1980 (age 45); Oslo, Norway
- Height: 6 ft 1 in (185 cm)
- Weight: 194 lb (88 kg; 13 st 12 lb)
- Position: Centre
- Shot: Left
- Played for: Furuset Ishockey; Laredo Bucks; Toledo Storm; Las Vegas Wranglers; SaiPa; Djurgårdens IF; Füchse Duisburg; Nürnberg Ice Tigers; Lørenskog IK; Sparta Praha; HV71; Vålerenga
- National team: Norway
- Playing career: 2001–2019

Morten Ask (born May 14, 1980) is a Norwegian professional ice hockey player who last played for Vålerenga Ishockey of the Norwegian GET-ligaen.

== Playing career ==
Beginning his career in Norway for Vålerenga Ishockey of the GET-ligaen, Ask moved to North America and had spells in the CHL with the Laredo Bucks in the 2002–2003 season and the ECHL with the Toledo Storm and the Las Vegas Wranglers. In 2005 he moved to Finland's SM-liiga and spent a season with SaiPa. In 2006 he moved to Sweden and signed with Djurgården where he played until 2007 before moving to Füchse Duisburg in Germany's Deutsche Eishockey Liga during the 2007–08 season. After the insolvence of Duisburg, Ask signed a contract with Nürnberg Ice Tigers on July 7, 2009. He then signed try-out contracts with first HC Sparta Praha of the Czech Extraliga, and then with Lørenskog IK of the GET-ligaen, but he wasn't offered an extension with any of the two teams. After failing twice to take a regular spot in a team for the 2011–12 season, Ask signed a two-month contract with HV71 of the Swedish Elitserien on November 2, 2011.

On January 7, 2014, he was named to Team Norway's official 2014 Winter Olympics roster. Later in 2014 Ask was featured on the Norwegian TV2's documentary "Iskrigerne", for his play in Vålerenga.

== Career statistics ==
=== Regular season and playoffs ===
			Regular season					Playoffs
Season	Team	League	GP	G	A	Pts	PIM	GP	G	A	Pts	PIM
1997–98	Furuset	Norway	28	8	3	11	71	—	—	—	—	—
1998–99	Vålerenga	Norway	35	9	11	20	65	—	—	—	—	—
1999–2000	Vålerenga	Norway	32	10	21	31	138	—	—	—	—	—
2000–01	Vålerenga	Norway	30	13	22	35	94	—	—	—	—	—
2001–02	Vålerenga	Norway	27	7	11	18	103	3	0	2	2	27
2002–03	Vålerenga	Norway	6	4	4	8	35	—	—	—	—	—
2002–03	Laredo Bucks	CHL	48	21	30	51	57	11	3	2	5	22
2003–04	Toledo Storm	ECHL	62	21	30	51	81	—	—	—	—	—
2003–04	Las Vegas Wranglers	ECHL	5	4	4	8	4	—	—	—	—	—
2004–05	Las Vegas Wranglers	ECHL	8	2	4	6	4	—	—	—	—	—
2004–05	Vålerenga	Norway	18	11	12	23	60	8	4	4	8	24
2005–06	SaiPa	SM-l	23	2	2	4	39	8	2	2	4	6
2006–07	Djurgårdens IF	SEL	49	5	13	18	62	—	—	—	—	—
2007–08	Djurgårdens IF	SEL	15	2	5	7	8	—	—	—	—	—
2007–08	Füchse Duisburg	DEL	27	4	15	19	42	—	—	—	—	—
2008–09	Füchse Duisburg	DEL	50	11	24	35	139	—	—	—	—	—
2009–10	Nürnberg Ice Tigers	DEL	42	10	23	33	119	—	—	—	—	—
2010–11	Vålerenga	Norway	—	—	—	—	—	5	0	3	3	10
2011–12	Lørenskog IK	Norway	3	0	0	0	4	—	—	—	—	—
2011–12	HV71	SEL	31	1	1	2	12	—	—	—	—	—
2012–13	Vålerenga	Norway	27	12	27	39	121	15	7	7	14	28
2013–14	Vålerenga	Norway	44	15	51	66	66	16	6	5	11	58
2014–15	Vålerenga	Norway	30	11	20	31	104	10	0	6	6	33
2015–16	Vålerenga	Norway	28	1	17	18	50	11	3	5	8	8
2016–17	Vålerenga	Norway	38	5	24	29	40	1	0	0	0	0
2017–18	Vålerenga	Norway	37	8	14	22	50	5	0	0	0	6
2018–19	Vålerenga	Norway	39	3	17	20	16	10	2	1	3	4
Norway totals			422	117	254	371	1003	84	22	33	55	198

=== International ===
Year	Team	Event	GP	G	A	Pts	PIM
1996	Norway	EJC B	3	1	0	1	4
1997	Norway	WJC B	7	1	1	2	12
1997	Norway	EJC B	6	2	2	4	37
1998	Norway	EJC	6	1	2	3	16
1999	Norway	WJC B	6	2	0	2	14
2001	Norway	OGQ	3	2	2	4	2
2001	Norway	WC	6	1	2	3	10
2002	Norway	WC D1	5	1	1	2	6
2005	Norway	OGQ	3	0	3	3	10
2005	Norway	WC D1	5	6	6	12	18
2006	Norway	WC	6	1	3	4	4
2007	Norway	WC	6	3	4	7	10
2008	Norway	WC	7	3	2	5	8
2009	Norway	OGQ	3	1	0	1	14
2009	Norway	WC	6	0	2	2	10
2011	Norway	WC	7	1	3	4	10
2012	Norway	WC	8	2	8	10	6
2013	Norway	WC	7	0	1	1	4
2014	Norway	OG	4	0	0	0	2
2014	Norway	WC	6	3	2	5	2
2015	Norway	WC	7	1	2	3	10
2016	Norway	WC	7	0	0	0	4
Junior totals			28	7	5	12	83
Senior totals			96	25	41	66	130
