= Kenny Corupe =

Canadian ice hockey player

- Born: January 18, 1980 (age 46) Hamilton, Ontario, Canada
- Height: 6 ft 1 in (185 cm)
- Weight: 198 lb (90 kg; 14 st 2 lb)
- Position: Centre
- Shot: Right
- Played for: AHL; Saint John Flames; Wilkes-Barre/Scranton Penguins; ECHL; Birmingham Bulls; Johnstown Chiefs; Columbus Cottonmouths; Louisiana IceGators; Wheeling Nailers
- NHL draft: Undrafted
- Playing career: 1999–2015

Jonathan Kenneth Corupe (born January 18, 1980) is a Canadian retired professional ice hockey player.

During the 2013–14 GET-ligaen season, Corupe scored 66 points (30 goals and 36 assists) to tie with Morten Ask for the most points scored in the GET-ligaen.

== Career statistics ==
			Regular season					Playoffs
Season	Team	League	GP	G	A	Pts	PIM	GP	G	A	Pts	PIM
1996–97	Burlington Cougars	OPJHL	47	16	19	35	35	—	—	—	—	—
1997–98	Toronto St. Michael's Majors	OHL	60	12	6	18	14	—	—	—	—	—
1998–99	Toronto St. Michael's Majors	OHL	68	22	33	55	24	—	—	—	—	—
1999–00	Toronto St. Michael's Majors	OHL	40	22	24	46	47	—	—	—	—	—
1999–00	Owen Sound Platers	OHL	24	9	13	22	30	—	—	—	—	—
1999–00	Birmingham Bulls	ECHL	6	4	1	5	2	—	—	—	—	—
2000–01	Johnstown Chiefs	ECHL	12	2	6	8	20	—	—	—	—	—
2000–01	Saint John Flames	AHL	44	3	4	7	26	—	—	—	—	—
2001–02	Odessa Jackalopes	CHL	49	18	32	50	60	5	1	2	3	4
2001–02	Columbus Cottonmouths	ECHL	11	2	4	6	16	—	—	—	—	—
2002–03	Louisiana IceGators	ECHL	71	20	22	42	56	6	0	1	1	0
2003–04	Louisiana IceGators	ECHL	58	18	37	55	37	9	2	3	5	8
2004–05	Wheeling Nailers	ECHL	34	8	16	24	18	—	—	—	—	—
2004–05	Wilkes-Barre/Scranton Penguins	AHL	24	0	2	2	6	8	0	0	0	2
2005–06	Wilkes-Barre/Scranton Penguins	AHL	59	11	13	24	42	11	0	1	1	0
2006–07	SG Cortina	Italy	33	25	39	64	36	8	10	10	20	10
2007–08	HDD Olimpija Ljubljana	EBEL	28	7	8	15	24	—	—	—	—	—
2007–08	HC Bolzano	Italy	18	9	10	19	20	12	8	10	18	24
2008–09	HC Bolzano	Italy	50	35	49	84	58	8	3	8	11	6
2009–10	HC Bolzano	Italy	38	17	31	48	24	10	0	4	4	4
2010–11	Odessa Jackalopes	CHL	66	21	23	44	52	8	2	3	5	2
2011–12	Lørenskog IK	Norway	45	22	33	55	70	16	10	6	16	18
2012–13	Lørenskog IK	Norway	45	25	36	61	38	12	10	7	17	12
2013–14	Lørenskog IK	Norway	45	30	36	66	38	5	2	1	3	10
2014–15	Lørenskog IK	Norway	—	—	—	—	—	—	—	—	—	—
AHL totals			127	14	19	33	74	19	0	1	1	2
ECHL totals			192	54	86	140	149	15	2	4	6	8
Italy totals			139	86	129	215	138	38	21	32	53	44
Norway totals			135	77	105	182	146	33	22	14	36	40
