= Steffen Thoresen =

Norwegian ice hockey player

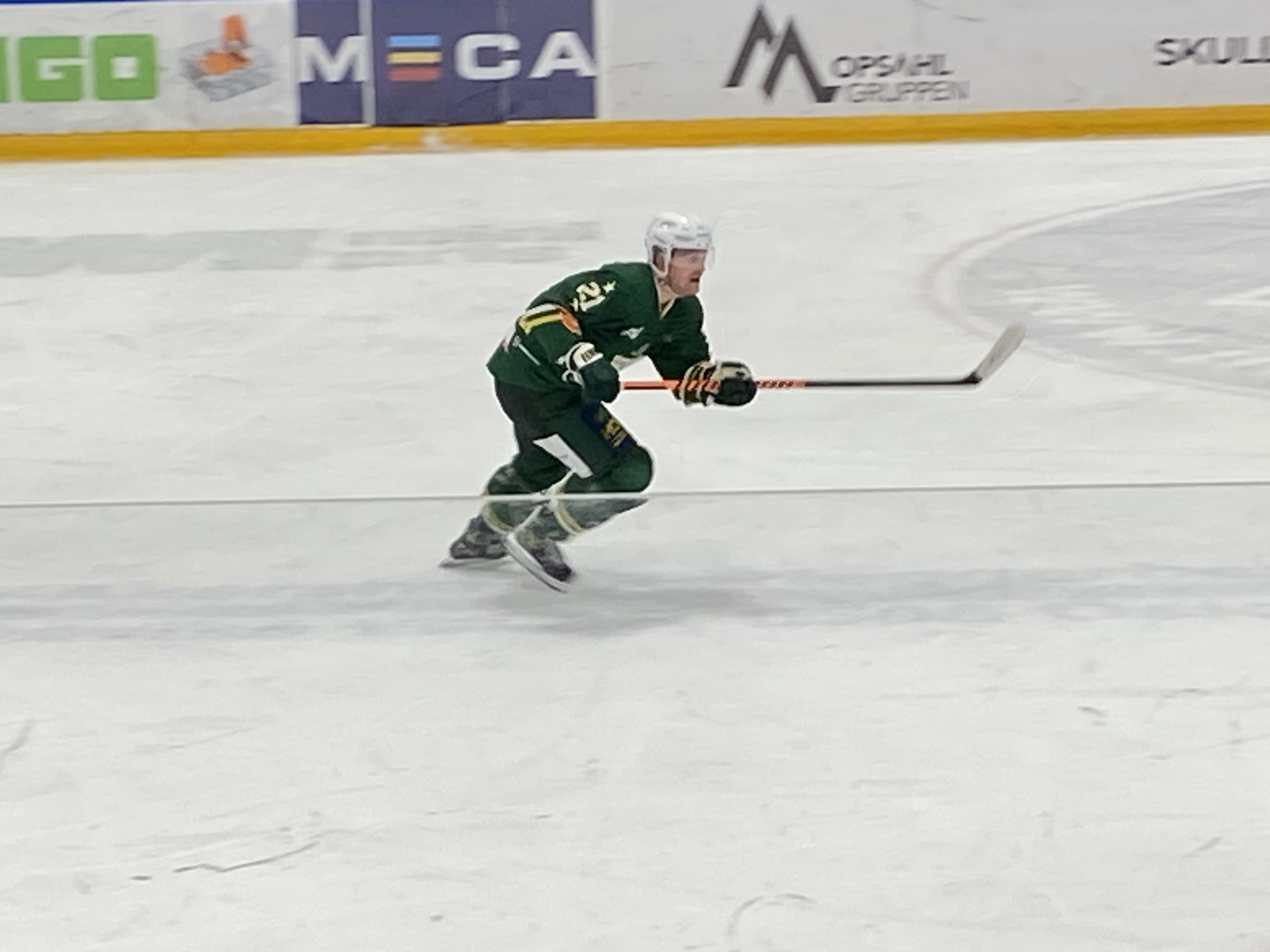
- Born: June 3, 1985 (age 40) Oslo, Norway
- Height: 5 ft 11 in (180 cm)
- Weight: 194 lb (88 kg; 13 st 12 lb)
- Position: Right wing
- Shoots: Left
- GET-ligaen team Former teams: Storhamar; Växjö Lakers (Elitserien); Storhamar Dragons; Vålerenga; Lørenskog IK
- National team: Norway
- NHL draft: Undrafted
- Playing career: 2003–present

Steffen Thoresen (born June 3, 1985) is a Norwegian ice hockey player. He is currently playing with the Storhamar of the Norwegian GET-ligaen.

== International ==
Thoresen played with the Norway men's national ice hockey team at the 2007 IIHF World Championship. He was named to Team Norway for competition at the 2014 IIHF World Championship.

== Career statistics ==
=== Regular season and playoffs ===
| | | | Regular season | | | | | Playoffs |
| Season | Team | League | GP | G | A | Pts | PIM | GP | G | A | Pts | PIM |
|---|---|---|---|---|---|---|---|---|---|---|---|---|
| 2001–02 | Färjestad BK | J18 Allsv | 14 | 10 | 4 | 14 | 12 | — | — | — | — | — |
| 2002–03 | Färjestad BK | J18 Allsv | 14 | 4 | 9 | 13 | 24 | — | — | — | — | — |
| 2003–04 | Skåre BK | SWE.3 | 24 | 7 | 5 | 12 | 47 | 10 | 3 | 0 | 3 | 14 |
| 2004–05 | Storhamar Dragons | NOR | 41 | 10 | 9 | 19 | 100 | 5 | 1 | 5 | 6 | 25 |
| 2005–06 | Storhamar Dragons | NOR | 42 | 17 | 19 | 36 | 65 | 10 | 1 | 0 | 1 | 35 |
| 2006–07 | Storhamar Dragons | NOR | 44 | 23 | 21 | 44 | 64 | 15 | 8 | 4 | 12 | 44 |
| 2007–08 | Växjö Lakers | Allsv | 22 | 7 | 3 | 10 | 10 | — | — | — | — | — |
| 2007–08 | Vålerenga Ishockey | NOR | 16 | 8 | 11 | 19 | 59 | 13 | 4 | 9 | 13 | 38 |
| 2008–09 | Vålerenga Ishockey | NOR | 45 | 20 | 19 | 39 | 44 | 17 | 4 | 2 | 6 | 24 |
| 2009–10 | Vålerenga Ishockey | NOR | 46 | 12 | 14 | 26 | 79 | 16 | 4 | 8 | 12 | 16 |
| 2010–11 | Vålerenga Ishockey | NOR | 44 | 13 | 21 | 34 | 58 | 4 | 1 | 0 | 1 | 52 |
| 2011–12 | Vålerenga Ishockey | NOR | 31 | 16 | 17 | 33 | 22 | 12 | 3 | 4 | 7 | 34 |
| 2012–13 | Vålerenga Ishockey | NOR | 43 | 17 | 32 | 49 | 63 | 15 | 3 | 5 | 8 | 24 |
| 2013–14 | Lørenskog IK | NOR | 42 | 21 | 15 | 36 | 93 | 5 | 0 | 3 | 3 | 6 |
| 2014–15 | Lørenskog IK | NOR | 42 | 15 | 16 | 31 | 63 | 5 | 0 | 0 | 0 | 14 |
| 2015–16 | Lørenskog IK | NOR | 45 | 14 | 22 | 36 | 40 | 17 | 4 | 4 | 8 | 18 |
| 2016–17 | Lørenskog IK | NOR | 41 | 14 | 17 | 31 | 69 | 7 | 2 | 0 | 2 | 6 |
| 2017–18 | Storhamar Dragons | NOR | 41 | 13 | 10 | 23 | 30 | 14 | 9 | 3 | 12 | 14 |
| 2018–19 | Storhamar Dragons | NOR | 46 | 6 | 12 | 18 | 78 | 16 | 3 | 3 | 6 | 4 |
| 2019–20 | Storhamar Dragons | NOR | 42 | 4 | 13 | 17 | 71 | — | — | — | — | — |
| 2020–21 | Manglerud Star | NOR | 18 | 4 | 5 | 9 | 35 | — | — | — | — | — |
| 2021–22 | Manglerud Star | NOR | 38 | 10 | 7 | 17 | 67 | — | — | — | — | — |
| NOR totals | | | 707 | 237 | 280 | 517 | 1100 | 171 | 47 | 50 | 97 | 354 |

=== International ===
| Year | Team | Event | GP | G | A | Pts | PIM |
|---|---|---|---|---|---|---|---|
| 2002 | Norway | WJC18 | 8 | 0 | 1 | 1 | 2 |
| 2003 | Norway | WJC18 D1 | 5 | 1 | 1 | 2 | 2 |
| 2004 | Norway | WJC D1 | 5 | 2 | 1 | 3 | 29 |
| 2005 | Norway | WJC D1 | 5 | 4 | 3 | 7 | 8 |
| 2007 | Norway | WC | 6 | 0 | 0 | 0 | 0 |
| 2014 | Norway | WC | 3 | 0 | 0 | 0 | 0 |
| 2018 | Norway | OG | 5 | 0 | 0 | 0 | 6 |
| 2018 | Norway | WC | 7 | 0 | 1 | 1 | 6 |
| Junior totals | | | 23 | 7 | 6 | 13 | 41 |
| Senior totals | | | 21 | 0 | 1 | 1 | 12 |
