= Martin Laumann Ylven =

Norwegian ice hockey player

Martin Ylven
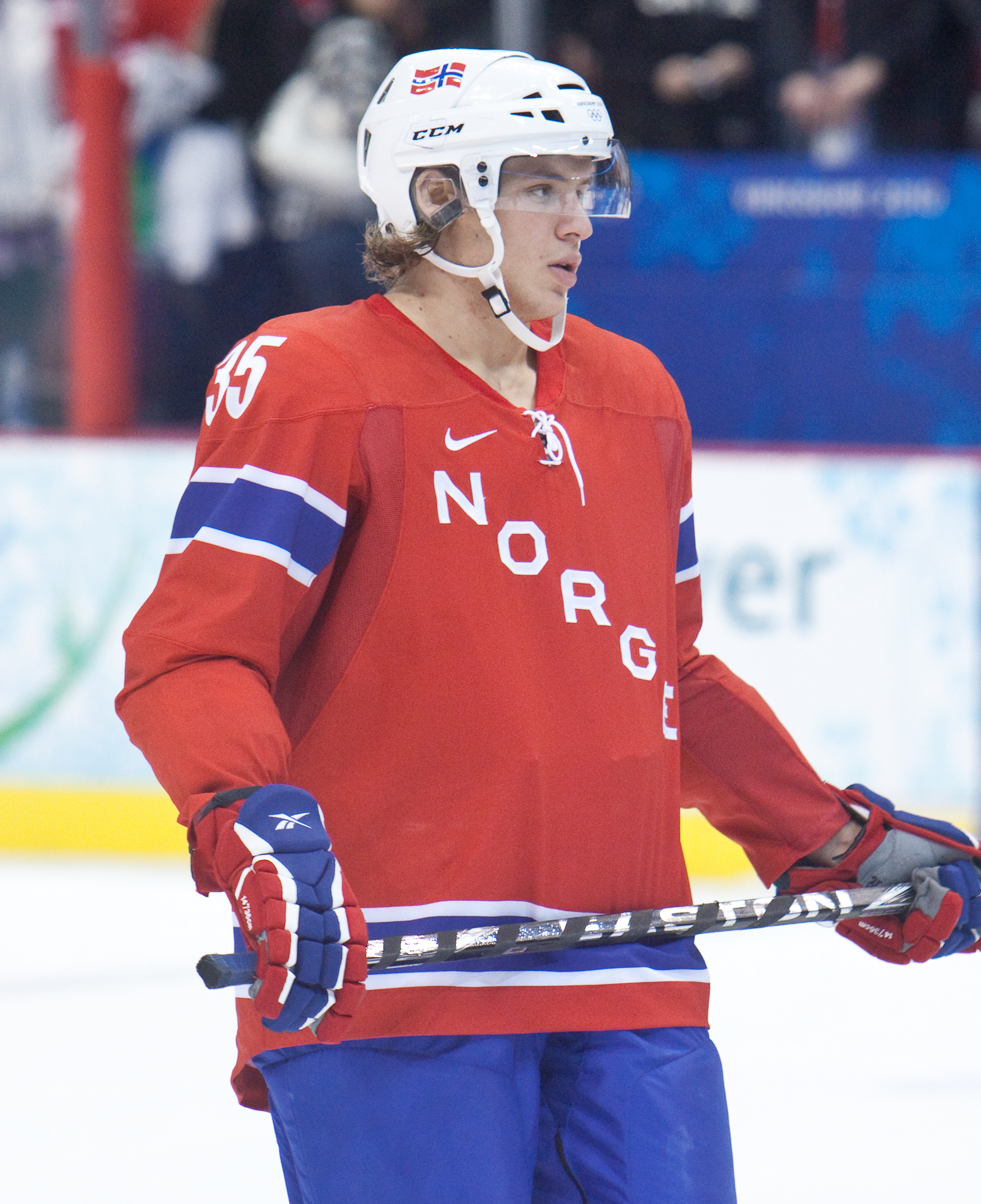
- Martin Ylven (2010)
- Born: December 22, 1988 (age 37) Oslo, Norway
- Height: 6 ft 2 in (188 cm)
- Weight: 225 lb (102 kg; 16 st 1 lb)
- Position: Right wing
- Shot: Left
- GET team Former teams: Vålerenga; Lørenskog IK; IK Oskarshamn; Stjernen; Linköpings HC
- National team: Norway
- NHL draft: Undrafted
- Playing career: 2006–2019

Martin Laumann Ylven (born December 22, 1988, in Oslo, Norway) is a Norwegian professional ice hockey forward. He currently plays for Vålerenga of the Norwegian GET-ligaen.

Ylven joined the Linköpings organization in 2004 and played on their junior teams for three seasons. He made his professional debut in the Elitserien during the 2006–07 season. He returned to Norway in 2007, playing the most games (25) with Stjernen Hockey of the top-level GET-ligaen, before rejoining Linköpings in 2008. He once again returned to Norway in 2011, signing for Lørenskog IK.

Ylven was selected to play for the Norway men's national ice hockey team at the 2010 Winter Olympics. He previously represented Norway at the 2005 and 2006 IIHF World U18 Championships, the 2007 and 2008 IIHF World U20 Championship, and the 2009 World Ice Hockey Championships.

== Career statistics ==
=== Regular season and playoffs ===
			Regular season					Playoffs
Season	Team	League	GP	G	A	Pts	PIM	GP	G	A	Pts	PIM
2004–05	Linköping HC	J18	25	8	4	12	28	—	—	—	—	—
2004–05	Linköping HC	J20	6	0	0	0	0	—	—	—	—	—
2005–06	Linköping HC	J18	17	13	1	14	24	—	—	—	—	—
2005–06	Linköping HC	J20	32	6	6	12	12	7	2	1	3	4
2006–07	Linköping HC	J20	39	5	8	13	54	5	2	1	3	4
2006–07	Linköping HC	SEL	2	0	0	0	0	—	—	—	—	—
2007–08	Linköping HC	J20	2	0	1	1	0	—	—	—	—	—
2007–08	IK Oskarshamn	Allsv	13	1	1	2	8	—	—	—	—	—
2007–08	Stjernen Hockey	NOR	25	8	3	11	88	—	—	—	—	—
2008–09	Linköping HC	J20	1	1	0	1	10	—	—	—	—	—
2008–09	Linköping HC	SEL	55	1	1	2	38	7	0	1	1	4
2009–10	Linköping HC	SEL	52	2	4	6	38	12	0	0	0	8
2010–11	Linköping HC	SEL	46	6	4	10	55	3	0	0	0	25
2011–12	Linköping HC	SEL	24	0	0	0	56	—	—	—	—	—
2011–12	Lørenskog IK	NOR	11	2	5	7	104	15	4	4	8	109
2012–13	Lørenskog IK	NOR	41	13	19	32	152	12	3	2	5	38
2013–14	Lørenskog IK	NOR	17	3	2	5	41	—	—	—	—	—
2014–15	Lørenskog IK	NOR	3	1	1	2	4	—	—	—	—	—
2015–16	Vålerenga Ishockey	NOR	43	15	16	31	53	11	5	6	11	37
2016–17	Vålerenga Ishockey	NOR	45	28	22	50	30	6	0	4	4	10
2017–18	Vålerenga Ishockey	NOR	31	9	11	20	70	5	1	0	1	4
2018–19	Vålerenga Ishockey	NOR	48	11	7	18	57	8	1	0	1	6
SEL totals			181	9	9	18	187	22	0	1	1	37
NOR totals			264	90	86	176	599	63	15	19	34	210

=== International ===
Year	Team	Event	GP	G	A	Pts	PIM
2005	Norway	WJC18 D1	5	0	2	2	2
2006	Norway	WJC18	6	2	5	7	4
2007	Norway	WJC D1	5	2	0	2	6
2008	Norway	WJC D1	5	2	0	2	8
2009	Norway	WC	6	0	0	0	6
2010	Norway	OG	4	0	0	0	0
2010	Norway	WC	4	0	0	0	31
2011	Norway	WC	3	0	0	0	0
Junior totals			21	6	7	13	20
Senior totals			17	0	0	0	37
