= Lars Erik Spets =

Norwegian ice hockey player

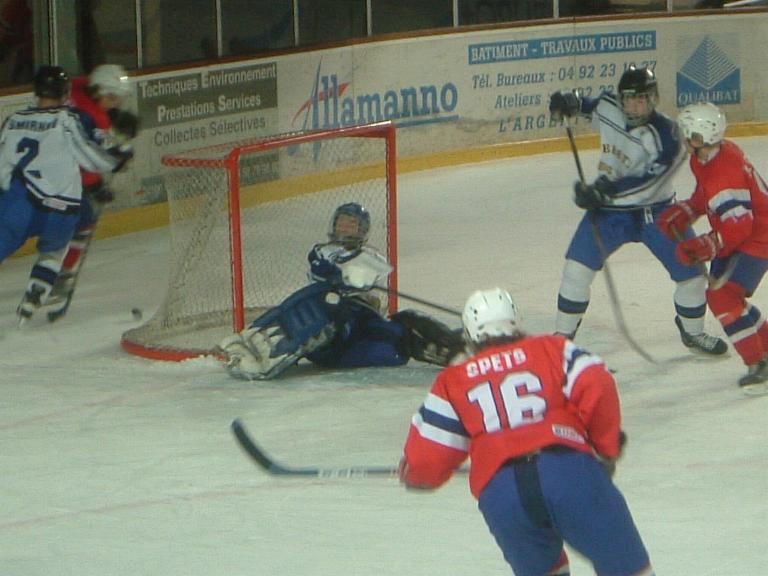
- Born: 2 April 1985 (age 40) Lillehammer, Norway
- Height: 5 ft 10 in (178 cm)
- Weight: 180 lb (82 kg; 12 st 12 lb)
- Position: Left wing
- Shot: Left
- Played for: Lillehammer; Trondheim Black Panthers; Brynäs IF; Füchse Duisburg; Lørenskog; Vålerenga
- National team: Norway
- Playing career: 2002–2019

Lars Erik Spets (born April 2, 1985) is a Norwegian professional ice hockey player, who last played for Vålerenga in the GET-ligaen. He is well known for being offensively gifted and for his long dark hair.

== Club career ==
=== Early career ===
He started his career with Lillehammer in the 2002–03 GET-ligaen season, where he played two seasons before moving to Trondheim Black Panthers before the 2004–05 season.

=== Moving abroad ===
In 2005, he signed with the Swedish SEL-team Brynäs, where he played two and a half seasons before moving to Germany and the Füchse Duisburg of the DEL in early 2008.

=== Back home ===
On 30 September 2008, Spets decided to move back to Norway to play for Vålerenga Ishockey. While there, he was teammates with his older brother, Knut Henrik Spets. In 2009, he won the GET-ligaen championship and was named playoff MVP after scoring 17 points in 17 games. Spets was traded to Lørenskog in 2010. Spets also has a younger brother named Vegard who played most of his junior career with Lillehammer but will play for Rosenborg starting in the 2011-12 season.

== International career ==
Spets has played for the Norway national ice hockey team since 2005. He has also played in national youth teams from the age of 17. In 2010, he played for Norway at the Winter Olympics in Vancouver, British Columbia, Canada.

== Career statistics ==
=== Regular season and playoffs ===
			Regular season					Playoffs
Season	Team	League	GP	G	A	Pts	PIM	GP	G	A	Pts	PIM
2001–02	Lillehammer IK	NOR U19						—	—	—	—	—
2002–03	Lillehammer IK	NOR U19	9	4	5	9	6	—	—	—	—	—
2002–03	Lillehammer IK	NOR	33	14	16	30	8	—	—	—	—	—
2003–04	Lillehammer IK	NOR	40	28	15	43	12	—	—	—	—	—
2004–05	Trondheim Black Panthers	NOR	42	29	25	54	12	11	3	6	9	6
2005–06	Brynäs IF	J20	2	0	3	3	0	—	—	—	—	—
2005–06	Brynäs IF	SEL	50	2	5	7	14	4	1	0	1	0
2006–07	Brynäs IF	J20	2	1	2	3	0	—	—	—	—	—
2006–07	Brynäs IF	SEL	50	3	5	8	10	2	0	0	0	0
2007–08	Brynäs IF	SEL	33	3	6	9	27	—	—	—	—	—
2007–08	Füchse Duisburg	DEL	10	2	4	6	6	—	—	—	—	—
2008–09	Vålerenga Ishockey	NOR	38	15	31	46	18	17	6	11	17	14
2009–10	Vålerenga Ishockey	NOR	43	15	33	48	28	15	7	6	13	16
2010–11	Lørenskog IK	NOR	45	14	24	38	18	11	4	8	12	2
2011–12	Lørenskog IK	NOR	43	17	36	53	48	16	5	7	12	24
2012–13	Lørenskog IK	NOR	35	15	21	36	16	12	2	10	12	6
2013–14	Lørenskog IK	NOR	44	17	30	47	46	5	2	3	5	16
2014–15	Lørenskog IK	NOR	33	10	16	26	10	6	2	0	2	0
2015–16	Lørenskog IK	NOR	23	3	5	8	8	8	0	1	1	0
2018–19	Vålerenga Ishockey	NOR	17	3	5	8	6	—	—	—	—	—
NOR totals			436	180	257	437	230	101	31	52	83	84
SEL totals			133	8	16	24	51	6	1	0	1	0

=== International ===
Year	Team	Event	GP	G	A	Pts	PIM
2002	Norway	WJC18	8	3	3	6	4
2003	Norway	WJC D1	5	1	0	1	4
2003	Norway	WJC18 D1	5	3	1	4	4
2004	Norway	WJC D1	5	3	3	6	4
2005	Norway	WJC D1	5	4	3	7	2
2005	Norway	OGQ	3	0	0	0	2
2005	Norway	WC D1	5	4	5	9	12
2006	Norway	WC	6	0	0	0	0
2007	Norway	WC	6	2	1	3	4
2008	Norway	WC	7	1	1	2	0
2009	Norway	OGQ	3	1	0	1	2
2009	Norway	WC	6	0	1	1	2
2010	Norway	OG	4	0	0	0	2
2010	Norway	WC	6	1	2	3	0
2011	Norway	WC	7	1	2	3	2
2012	Norway	WC	8	3	1	4	4
2013	Norway	WC	7	0	0	0	2
Junior totals			26	14	10	24	18
Senior totals			68	13	13	26	32
