= Bryce Lampman =

American ice hockey player

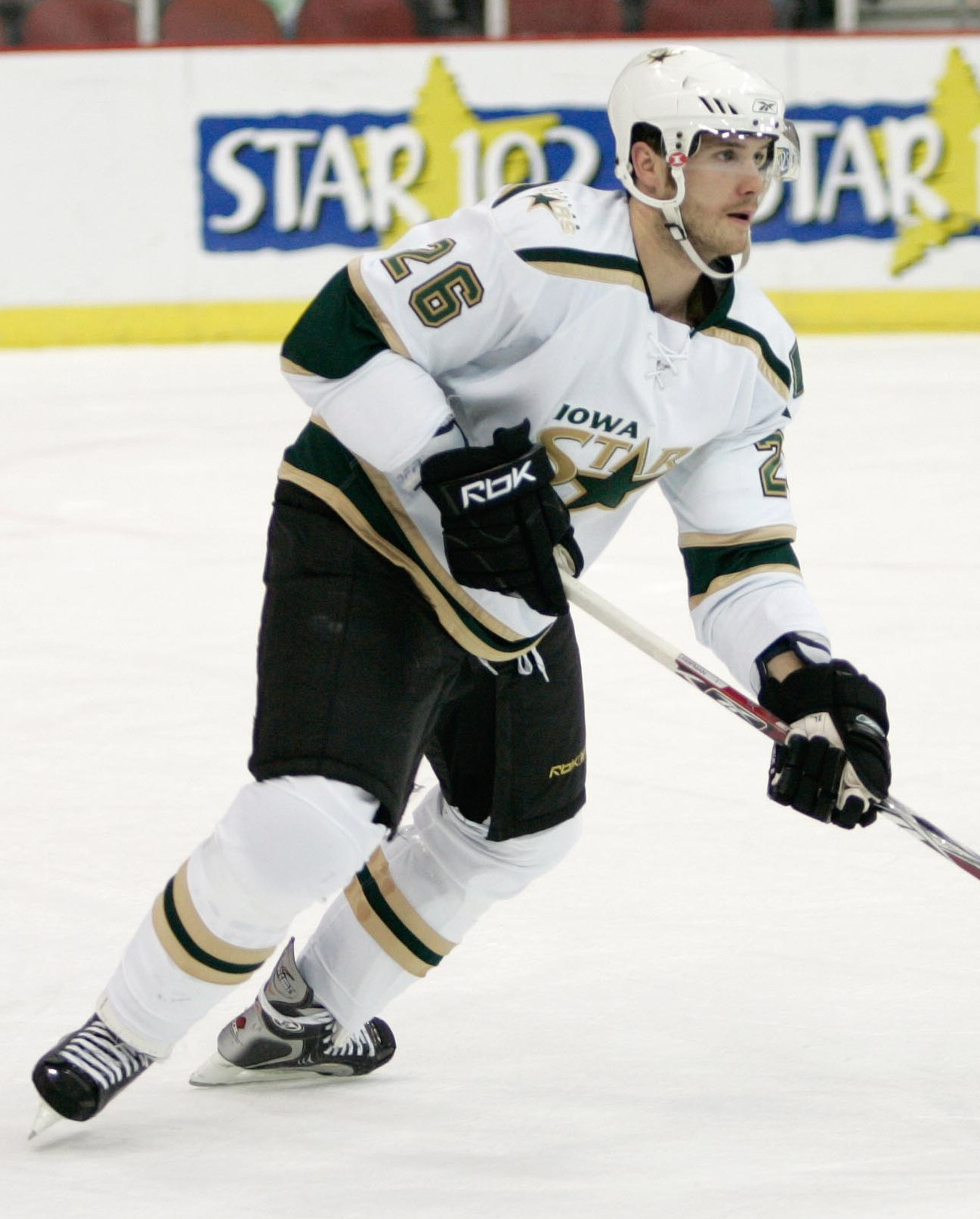
- Lampman with the Iowa Stars in 2008
- Born: August 31, 1982 (age 43) Rochester, Minnesota, U.S.
- Height: 6 ft 1 in (185 cm)
- Weight: 198 lb (90 kg; 14 st 2 lb)
- Position: Defense
- Shot: Left
- Played for: New York Rangers; Amur Khabarovsk; ERC Ingolstadt; Hannover Scorpions; Lørenskog IK
- NHL draft: 113th overall, 2002; New York Rangers
- Playing career: 2002–2014

Bryce James Lampman (born August 31, 1982) is an American former professional ice hockey defenseman who played in the National Hockey League with the New York Rangers.

== Playing career ==
Lampman was drafted 113th overall by the New York Rangers in the 2001 NHL entry draft. He has spent most of his professional career with the Rangers' AHL affiliate the Hartford Wolf Pack, though he has played ten games in the NHL for the Rangers. He played the 2008–09 season in Russia with HC Amur Khabarovsk, before signing as a free agent with the St. Louis Blues as a depth defenseman on July 29, 2009. Lampman is mostly known for scoring from center ice on a slapshot that beat Chicago Wolves' goalie Kari Lehtonen which led to an eventual 5–4 win on January 23, 2010, in the first period of an AHL game between the Peoria Rivermen and the Chicago Wolves.

In the 2010–11 season, Lampman, a free agent, began the season belatedly on a professional try-out with the Houston Aeros of the AHL on November 16, 2010. After five games he left the Aeros and signed with a German team, ERC Ingolstadt, of the DEL for the remainder of the year on December 24, 2010.

Lampman signed with the Florida Everblades of the ECHL on December 27, 2013. After 8 games with the Everblades in the 2013–14 season, Lampman returned to Europe, completing his 12 year career with Norwegian club, Lørenskog IK of the GET-ligaen.

== Career statistics ==
=== Regular season and playoffs ===
			Regular season					Playoffs
Season	Team	League	GP	G	A	Pts	PIM	GP	G	A	Pts	PIM
1998–99	Rochester Mustangs	USHL	53	3	8	11	33	—	—	—	—	—
1999–2000	Rochester Mustangs	USHL	10	0	0	0	14	—	—	—	—	—
1999–2000	Omaha Lancers	USHL	11	1	2	3	8	4	0	0	0	0
2000–01	Omaha Lancers	USHL	55	10	11	21	77	12	1	4	5	12
2001–02	University of Nebraska Omaha	CCHA	26	0	4	4	28	—	—	—	—	—
2002–03	Kamloops Blazers	WHL	29	1	17	18	34	—	—	—	—	—
2002–03	Hartford Wolf Pack	AHL	45	0	6	6	32	2	0	1	1	0
2003–04	Hartford Wolf Pack	AHL	68	4	11	15	50	16	1	3	4	14
2003–04	New York Rangers	NHL	8	0	0	0	0	—	—	—	—	—
2004–05	Hartford Wolf Pack	AHL	74	7	18	25	74	4	0	0	0	4
2005–06	New York Rangers	NHL	1	0	0	0	2	—	—	—	—	—
2005–06	Hartford Wolf Pack	AHL	11	2	3	5	16	—	—	—	—	—
2006–07	New York Rangers	NHL	1	0	0	0	0	—	—	—	—	—
2006–07	Hartford Wolf Pack	AHL	60	6	19	25	62	7	2	0	2	2
2007–08	Norfolk Admirals	AHL	16	3	3	6	4	—	—	—	—	—
2007–08	Iowa Stars	AHL	53	4	11	15	32	—	—	—	—	—
2008–09	Amur Khabarovsk	KHL	9	0	0	0	4	—	—	—	—	—
2009–10	Peoria Rivermen	AHL	54	7	13	20	22	—	—	—	—	—
2010–11	Houston Aeros	AHL	5	0	0	0	2	—	—	—	—	—
2010–11	ERC Ingolstadt	DEL	24	2	5	7	4	4	0	1	1	2
2011–12	Hannover Scorpions	DEL	52	0	14	14	44	—	—	—	—	—
2012–13	Orlando Solar Bears	ECHL	21	3	9	12	10	—	—	—	—	—
2012–13	Portland Pirates	AHL	8	0	0	0	0	—	—	—	—	—
2012–13	SCL Tigers	NLA	5	0	0	0	2	—	—	—	—	—
2013–14	Florida Everblades	ECHL	8	1	4	5	2	—	—	—	—	—
2013–14	Lørenskog IK	NOR	8	0	4	4	4	4	0	0	0	4
NHL totals			10	0	0	0	0	—	—	—	—	—
AHL totals			394	33	84	117	294	29	3	4	7	20

=== International ===
Year	Team	Event	Result	GP	G	A	Pts	PIM
2002	United States	WJC	5th	7	0	0	0	8
Junior totals				7	0	0	0	8
