= Daniel Sørvik =

Norwegian ice hockey player

- Born: 11 March 1990 (age 35); Oslo, Norway
- Height: 6 ft 0 in (183 cm)
- Weight: 183 lb (83 kg; 13 st 1 lb)
- Position: Defence
- Shoots: Left
- Czech Extraliga team Former teams: HC Verva Litvínov; Furuset; Vålerenga; GCK Lions
- National team: Norway
- Playing career: 2006–present

Daniel Sørvik (born 11 March 1990) is a Norwegian ice hockey player who plays for HC Verva Litvínov of the Czech Extraliga.

Sørvik competed in the 2013 to 2018 IIHF World Championship, and the Winter Olympics in 2014 and 2018, as a member of the Norway men's national ice hockey team.

Sørvik is the first Norwegian player to represent HC Verva Litvínov internationally.

== Career statistics ==
=== Regular season and playoffs ===
			Regular season					Playoffs
Season	Team	League	GP	G	A	Pts	PIM	GP	G	A	Pts	PIM
2006–07	Furuset Ishockey	NOR	15	1	2	3	8	3	0	0	0	0
2006–07	Furuset Ishockey II	NOR.2	12	3	2	5	32	—	—	—	—	—
2007–08	Furuset Ishockey	NOR	30	0	2	2	38	5	0	1	1	6
2007–08	Furuset Ishockey II	NOR.2	13	3	6	9	6	—	—	—	—	—
2008–09	Furuset Ishockey	NOR	42	3	3	6	48	—	—	—	—	—
2009–10	Vålerenga Ishockey	NOR	47	3	6	9	67	16	0	5	5	6
2010–11	Vålerenga Ishockey	NOR	45	7	14	21	48	5	0	0	0	2
2011–12	Vålerenga Ishockey	NOR	45	14	16	30	40	13	1	4	5	12
2012–13	Vålerenga Ishockey	NOR	44	7	20	27	44	12	0	4	4	78
2013–14	Vålerenga Ishockey	NOR	45	6	19	25	40	18	5	8	13	12
2014–15	Vålerenga Ishockey	NOR	45	19	39	58	60	10	4	3	7	8
2015–16	GCK Lions	SUI.2	25	4	13	17	12	—	—	—	—	—
2016–17	HC Verva Litvínov	ELH	40	6	10	16	24	5	0	0	0	4
2017–18	HC Verva Litvínov	ELH	42	4	8	12	26	—	—	—	—	—
2018–19	HC Verva Litvínov	ELH	9	0	1	1	2	—	—	—	—	—
2018–19	Vålerenga Ishockey	NOR	12	3	2	5	6	10	0	5	5	6
2019–20	Vålerenga Ishockey	NOR	17	2	9	11	16	—	—	—	—	—
2020–21	Vålerenga Ishockey	NOR	21	2	12	14	16	—	—	—	—	—
2021–22	Vålerenga Ishockey	NOR	35	3	9	12	22	6	0	2	2	0
NOR totals			443	70	153	223	453	98	10	32	42	130
ELH totals			91	10	19	29	52	5	0	0	0	4

=== International ===
Year	Team	Event	GP	G	A	Pts	PIM
2006	Norway	WJC18	4	0	0	0	2
2007	Norway	WJC18 D1	5	1	3	4	24
2008	Norway	WJC18 D1	5	4	2	6	4
2010	Norway	WJC D1	5	2	3	5	16
2013	Norway	WC	6	0	0	0	4
2014	Norway	OG	2	0	0	0	0
2014	Norway	WC	7	1	0	1	4
2015	Norway	WC	7	0	1	1	4
2017	Norway	WC	5	1	0	1	4
2018	Norway	OG	5	0	0	0	0
2018	Norway	WC	7	1	0	1	6
Junior totals			19	7	8	15	46
Senior totals			39	3	1	4	22
