= Eirik Salsten =

Norwegian ice hockey player (born 1994)

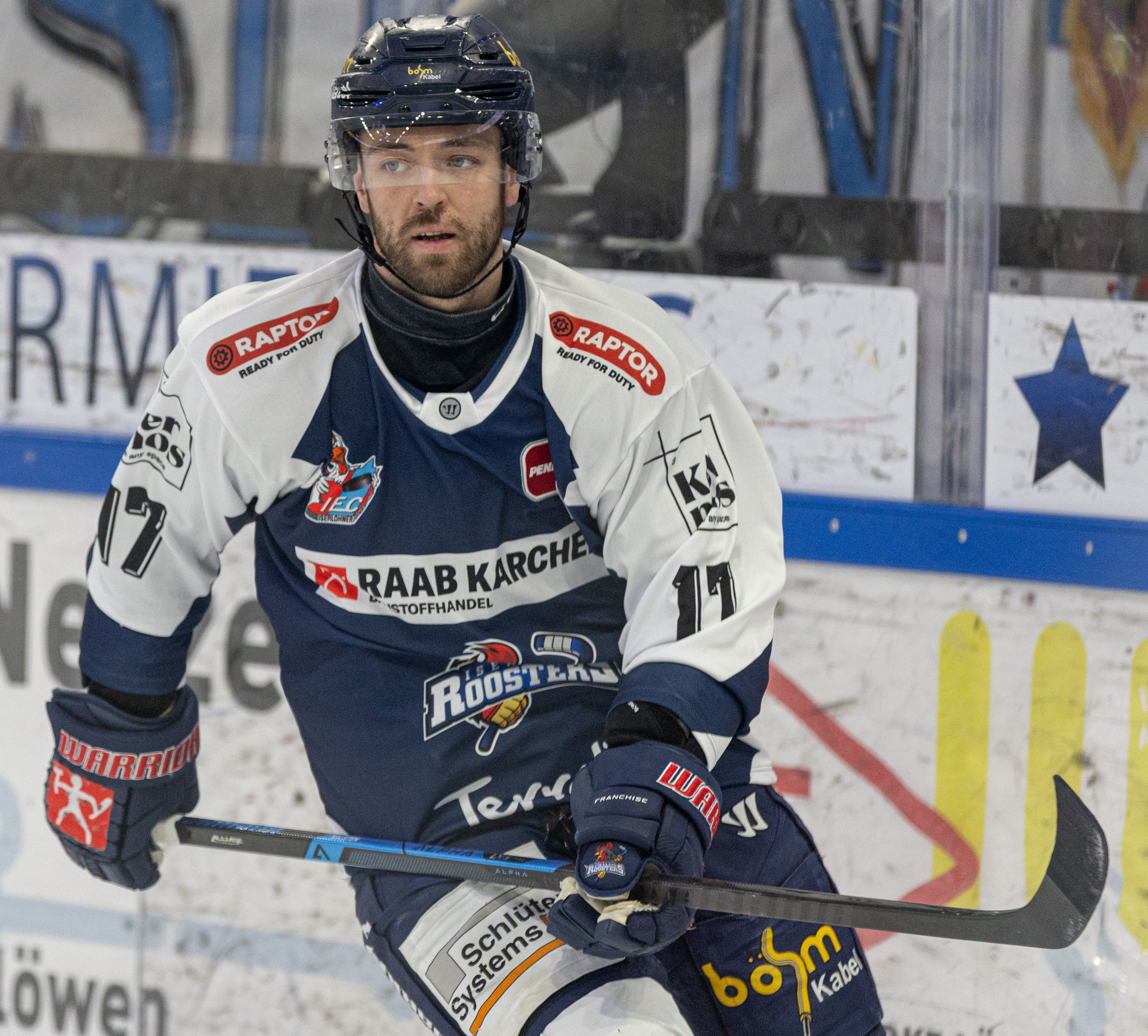
- Born: 17 June 1994 (age 32) Oslo, Norway
- Position: Centre
- Shoots: Left
- GET team Former teams: Storhamar; Stavanger Oilers; Manglerud Star; Vålerenga
- National team: Norway
- Playing career: 2014–present

Eirik Salsten (born 17 June 1994) is a Norwegian ice hockey player who is currently playing for HC Energie Karlovy Vary in the Tipsport Extraleague of the Czech republic.

Salsten was selected to compete at the 2018 Winter Olympics as a member of the Norway men's national ice hockey team.

Medal record

Men's ice hockey

Representing Norway

World Championships
Bronze medal – third place	2026 Switzerland	

== Career statistics ==
=== Regular season and playoffs ===
			Regular season					Playoffs
Season	Team	League	GP	G	A	Pts	PIM	GP	G	A	Pts	PIM
2009–10	Storhamar	NOR U17	34	34	46	80	32	2	2	0	2	4
2009–10	Storhamar	NOR U19	14	7	3	10	6	4	0	2	2	0
2010–11	Storhamar	NOR U17	8	5	6	11	18	3	5	1	6	0
2010–11	Storhamar	NOR U19	25	15	34	49	10	2	0	1	1	0
2010–11	Storhamar	NOR	28	0	0	0	0	1	0	0	0	0
2011–12	Storhamar	NOR U19	12	6	13	19	37	3	2	3	5	0
2011–12	Storhamar II	NOR.2	6	1	3	4	6	—	—	—	—	—
2011–12	Storhamar	NOR	37	4	2	6	4	6	0	1	1	25
2012–13	Storhamar	NOR U20	3	1	4	5	2	2	0	1	1	0
2012–13	Storhamar	NOR	39	3	7	10	20	3	0	0	0	0
2013–14	Storhamar	NOR U20	23	16	37	53	35	6	8	9	17	2
2014–15	Vålerenga	NOR	22	0	3	3	2	—	—	—	—	—
2014–15	Manglerud Star	NOR	13	2	2	4	2	—	—	—	—	—
2015–16	Manglerud Star	NOR	45	13	12	25	24	3	0	1	1	0
2016–17	Stavanger Oilers	NOR	44	14	19	33	28	14	5	3	8	10
2017–18	Stavanger Oilers	NOR	44	8	19	27	42	5	2	2	4	6
2018–19	Storhamar	NOR	38	7	11	18	16	16	1	6	7	2
2019–20	Storhamar	NOR	44	13	12	25	63	—	—	—	—	—
2020–21	Storhamar	NOR	23	3	16	19	14	—	—	—	—	—
2021–22	Storhamar	NOR	42	12	21	33	26	15	4	4	8	4
2022–23	Storhamar	NOR	39	14	24	38	12	14	1	6	7	0
NOR totals			458	93	148	241	253	77	13	23	36	47

=== International ===
Year	Team	Event	GP	G	A	Pts	PIM
2011	Norway	WJC18	6	0	0	0	6
2012	Norway	WJC18 D1A	5	1	5	6	6
2013	Norway	WJC D1A	5	1	4	5	4
2016	Norway	OGQ	3	0	0	0	2
2018	Norway	OG	3	0	0	0	0
2018	Norway	WC	7	0	1	1	2
2021	Norway	WC	5	0	0	0	0
2021	Norway	OGQ	3	0	1	1	0
2022	Norway	WC	7	0	0	0	0
2023	Norway	WC	7	0	1	1	2
2024	Norway	WC	7	2	1	3	2
2024	Norway	OGQ	3	0	2	2	0
2025	Norway	WC	7	1	1	2	0
2026	Norway	WC	10	1	1	2	8
Junior totals			16	2	9	11	16
Senior totals			62	4	8	12	16
