= Juha Kaunismäki =

Finnish-born Norwegian ice hockey player

- Born: 6 May 1979 (age 45); Helsinki, Finland
- Height: 6 ft 2 in (188 cm)
- Weight: 194 lb (88 kg; 13 st 12 lb)
- Position: Defence
- Shot: Left
- National team: Norway
- Playing career: 2000–2013

Juha Pekka Kaunismäki (born 6 May 1979 in Helsinki, Finland) is a Finnish-born Norwegian professional ice hockey defenceman, who currently plays with Stavanger Oilers of the Norway's elite GET-ligaen.

== Career ==
Kaunismäki began playing in Finland with the Jokerit organization's junior teams. He later played for Kiekko-Vantaa of the third-level Suomi-sarja and the second-level Mestis. Kaunismäki played a total of five seasons in Mestis league, two with Kiekko-Vantaa and three with Ahmat Hyvinkää. In 2003 he joined Stavanger of the Norwegian league.

== International career ==
Kaunismäki was selected to play for the Norway men's national ice hockey team at the 2010 Winter Olympics. He previously represented Norway at 2008 and 2009 World Ice Hockey Championships after changing his citizenship.

== Career statistics ==
=== Regular season and playoffs ===
			Regular season					Playoffs
Season	Team	League	GP	G	A	Pts	PIM	GP	G	A	Pts	PIM
1995–96	Jokerit	FIN U18	17	0	3	3	2	5	0	1	1	0
1996–97	Jokerit	FIN U18	34	4	9	13	26	—	—	—	—	—
1997–98	Kiekko–Vantaa	FIN.2 U20	14	4	8	12	43	12	1	4	5	16
1998–99	Jokerit	FIN U20	20	1	1	2	16	1	0	0	0	0
1999–2000	Kiekko–Vantaa	FIN.2 U20	12	6	6	12	47	18	6	6	12	32
1999–2000	Kiekko–Vantaa	FIN.3	4	0	0	0	0	—	—	—	—	—
2000–01	Kiekko–Vantaa	FIN.2	20	0	1	1	10	—	—	—	—	—
2000–01	Ahmat	FIN.2	11	1	2	3	4	2	0	0	0	0
2001–02	Ahmat	FIN.2	41	5	13	18	69	3	0	0	0	0
2002–03	Ahmat	FIN.2	43	2	9	11	40	4	0	0	0	6
2003–04	Kiekko–Vantaa	FIN.2	16	0	2	2	8	—	—	—	—	—
2003–04	Stavanger Oilers	NOR	24	4	9	13	44	7	2	1	3	8
2004–05	Stavanger Oilers	NOR	40	4	13	17	154	3	0	1	1	2
2005–06	Stavanger Oilers	NOR	37	0	10	10	99	17	1	0	1	8
2006–07	Stavanger Oilers	NOR	36	1	7	8	110	11	0	1	1	37
2007–08	Stavanger Oilers	NOR	39	1	9	10	93	4	1	0	1	6
2008–09	Stavanger Oilers	NOR	42	3	10	13	108	—	—	—	—	—
2009–10	Stavanger Oilers	NOR	40	0	7	7	91	18	0	2	2	20
2010–11	Stavanger Oilers	NOR	28	2	5	7	50	16	0	2	2	50
2010–11	Stavanger Oilers 2	NOR.2	2	0	0	0	0	—	—	—	—	—
2011–12	Stavanger Oilers	NOR	37	0	13	13	106	12	2	5	7	38
2012–13	Stavanger Oilers	NOR	43	6	9	15	104	17	0	4	4	26
FIN.2 totals			131	8	27	35	131	9	0	0	0	6
NOR totals			366	21	92	113	959	105	6	16	22	205

=== International ===
Year	Team	Event	GP	G	A	Pts	PIM
2008	Norway	WC	6	0	0	0	4
2009	Norway	OGQ	3	0	0	0	2
2009	Norway	WC	6	0	0	0	4
2010	Norway	OG	4	0	0	0	0
2010	Norway	WC	6	0	0	0	4
2012	Norway	WC	8	1	1	2	2
Senior totals			33	1	1	2	16
