= Juergen Penker =

Austrian ice hockey player

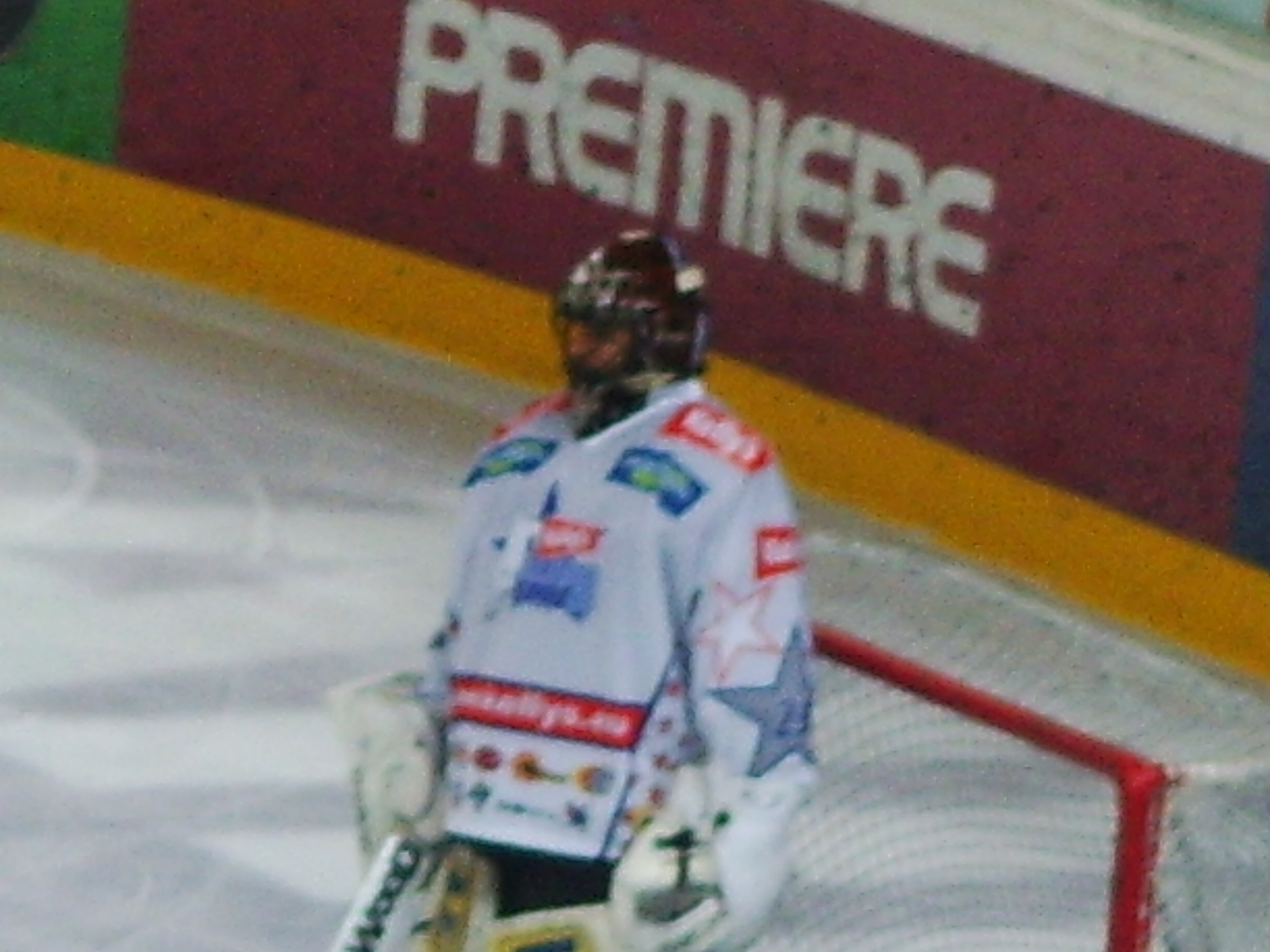
- Born: October 17, 1982 (age 43) Bregenz, Austria
- Height: 6 ft 1 in (185 cm)
- Weight: 198 lb (90 kg; 14 st 2 lb)
- Position: Goaltender
- Shoots: Left
- Austria team Former teams: Vienna Capitals; EHC Lustenau; VEU Feldkirch; EC Red Bull Salzburg; EHC Black Wings Linz; Hvidovre; Rögle BK; HK Nitra; Lørenskog IK
- National team: Austria
- NHL draft: Undrafted
- Playing career: 2000–present

Juergen Penker (born October 17, 1982) is an Austrian ice hockey goaltender who participated at the 2011 IIHF World Championship as a member of the Austria men's national ice hockey team.
