= Nicolai Bryhnisveen =

Norwegian ice hockey defenceman

- Born: 31 October 1991 (age 33); Oslo, Norway
- Height: 5 ft 11 in (180 cm)
- Weight: 187 lb (85 kg; 13 st 5 lb)
- Position: Defence
- Shoots: Left
- GET team Former teams: Stavanger Oilers; Vålerenga IF; Lørenskog IK; Lillehammer IK; Asplöven HC; Timrå IK; Oulun Kärpät; Tingsryds AIF; HC Dukla Jihlava; Coventry Blaze
- National team: Norway
- NHL draft: Undrafted
- Playing career: 2009–present

Nicolai Bryhnisveen (born 31 October 1991) is a Norwegian ice hockey defenceman. He is currently playing for Stavanger Oilers of the Norwegian GET-ligaen.

== International ==
Bryhnisveen was named to the Norway men's national ice hockey team for competition at the 2014 IIHF World Championship.
