= Mats Frøshaug =

Norwegian ice hockey player

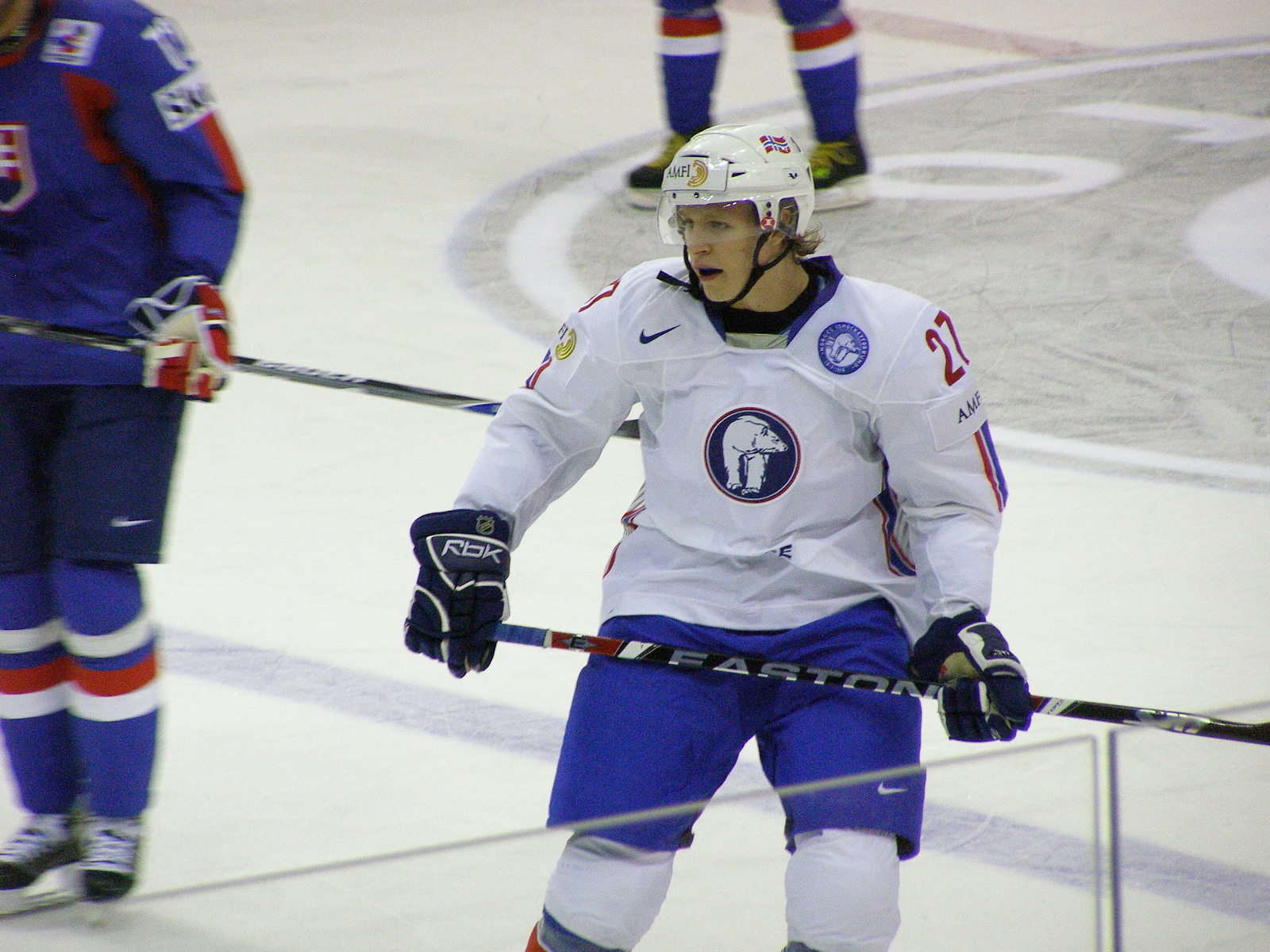
- Born: 31 July 1988 (age 37) Manglerud, Norway
- Height: 6 ft 1 in (185 cm)
- Weight: 198 lb (90 kg; 14 st 2 lb)
- Position: Centre/Left wing
- Shoots: Left
- Allsv team Former teams: Västervik; Lørenskog IK(GET); Sparta Warriors(GET); Manglerud Star(GET); Luleå (SEL); Linköping (SEL); Nyköping (Swe-2); Sunne (Swe-3)
- National team: Norway
- NHL draft: 161st overall, 2008; Vancouver Canucks
- Playing career: 2005–present

Mats Frøshaug (born 31 July 1988, in Manglerud, Norway) is a Norwegian professional ice hockey player who is currently with Västervik of HockeyAllsvenskan.

== Club career ==
=== Early career ===
Frøshaug grew up playing for Manglerud Star. At the age of 16, he moved to Sweden and began his junior career with Sunne. He played two seasons in the J18 and J20 Elit, beginning in 2004–05. He made his professional debut with Sunne in 2005–06, playing 14 games in Sweden's third-tier hockey league.

=== Linköping and NHL draft ===
The next season, he signed with Linköping and began competing in Sweden's premier junior league, the J20 SuperElit. After a 36-point season in 35 games with Linköping in 2007–08, he was drafted by the Vancouver Canucks in the sixth round, 161st overall, in the 2008 NHL entry draft. That season, he also made his Elitserien debut, playing in two games with Linköping. Continuing to play in the Elitserien in 2008–09, he was loaned to Luleå on November 25, 2008, for the remainder of the season.

=== Back in Norway ===
As a result of limited ice time at Luleå, Frøshuag joined Sparta Warriors on 13 January 2009. On 18 January 2010, it was announced that Frøshaug was loaned out to his maiden club, Manglerud Star, for the rest of 2009–10.

== International career ==
Frøshaug represented Norway at the 2008 IIHF World Championship in Canada.
