= Stan Reddick =

Canadian ice hockey player

- Born: June 12, 1969 (age 56) Toronto, Ontario, Canada
- Height: 5 ft 7 in (170 cm)
- Weight: 165 lb (75 kg; 11 st 11 lb)
- Position: Goaltender
- Caught: Right
- Played for: Utica Devils; Johnstown Chiefs; Raleigh IceCaps; Tallahassee Tiger Sharks; HDD Olimpija Ljubljana; Wichita Thunder
- National team: Slovenia
- Playing career: 1990–2002

Stanley "Smokey" Otis Reddick (born December 6, 1969) is a Canadian former professional ice hockey goaltender.

== Career ==
Nicknamed "Smokey" by his fans and teammates, Reddick spent his twelve-year career in the ECHL and in Europe. While in Europe, Reddick played in the Slovenian League and the Alpine League.

As a member of the Johnstown Chiefs in 1991-92, Reddick set a franchise record for single season wins (25). This record would stand unmatched for ten years when Frederic Deschênes matched Reddick's record in 2001-02. His record would later be broken by Chiefs goaltender Ryan Nie, who finished the 2007-08 ECHL season with 29 wins.

After retiring from professional hockey in 2002, Reddick played with the Ile des Chenes North Stars of the Hanover Tache Hockey League, located in Manitoba. As a member of the North Stars, Reddick led the North Stars to several early victories in the Allan Cup tournament.

== International play ==
Reddick played for the Slovenian national team on three separate occasions: 1997, 2001, and 2002 IIHF World Championships.

== Personal ==
Stan Reddick is the younger brother of former NHL goaltender Eldon "Pokey" Reddick. His nephew, Bryce Reddick, is a forward at Michigan Tech.

== Awards ==
- 1988-89: WHL East Second All-Star Team
- 1995-96: Slovenian Champion (Olimpija Ljubljana)
- 1996-97: Slovenian Champion (Olimpija Ljubljana)
- 1997-98: Slovenian Champion (Olimpija Ljubljana)
- 1998-99: Slovenian Champion (Olimpija Ljubljana)
- 1999-00: Slovenian Champion (Olimpija Ljubljana)
- 2000-01: World Championship Gold Medal (D1, pool B, Team Slovenia)
- 2002-03: Allan Cup (Ile des Chenes North Stars)
