= Ryan MacMurchy =

Canadian ice hockey player

- Born: April 27, 1983 (age 43) Regina, Saskatchewan, Canada
- Height: 6 ft 0 in (183 cm)
- Weight: 207 lb (94 kg; 14 st 11 lb)
- Position: Right wing
- Shot: Right
- Played for: Peoria Rivermen; Springfield Falcons; Abbotsford Heat; Stavanger Oilers; EHC Biel; ERC Ingolstadt; Adler Mannheim; EHC Kloten
- NHL draft: 284th overall, 2002; St. Louis Blues
- Playing career: 2006–2019

Ryan MacMurchy (born April 27, 1983) is a Canadian former professional ice hockey right winger who last played for EHC Kloten of the Swiss League (SL). He was drafted by the St. Louis Blues in the 9th round of the 2002 NHL entry draft, but has yet to play in the NHL.

== Playing career ==
MacMurchy played collegiate hockey with the University of Wisconsin in the Western Collegiate Hockey Association. MacMurchy began his professional career within the Blues organization with AHL affiliate, the Peoria Rivermen.

Unable to crack the NHL ranks, on August 5, 2011, MacMurchy embarked upon a European career, signing with Norwegian club, the Stavanger Oilers of the GET-ligaen. As the league's top point scorer in the 2011–12 regular season (37 goals and 76 points in 44 games), Ryan led Oilers to the team's first ever regular season championship. With points in every home game of the regular season and a 13-game pointstreak(home and away games), he shattered several team records. In a game against Frisk Tigers on December 30, 2011, Ryan scored 6 points (3 goals + 3 assists) and tied the team record for most points in one game.

The Oilers finished the regular season with a record breaking 112 points and earned the No. 1 seed heading into the playoffs. Stavanger swept both Rosenborg IHK (Quarter-final) and Lillehammer IK (Semi-final) in four games, earning the club's third consecutive playoff final appearance. On April 13, 2012, the Oilers won game six of the finals and became Norwegian Champions. Ryan, with 9 goals and 21 points, finished 3rd on the league leader board for the playoffs.

On April 9, 2012, the Norwegian Ice Hockey Association awarded Ryan, The Golden Helmet, an award given to the league's top point scorer. He was also appointed the Right Wing on the Team of the Year, a fictional team put together after votes from all the players in the league, alongside Stavanger Oilers Defenceman Tim Kunes.

As a free agent on April 22, 2012, Ryan left Norway and signed a contract with HC Red Ice of the Swiss National League B. In scoring 30 points in just 24 games, on January 15, 2013, he signed a contract until the end of season with EHC Biel of the Swiss National League A.

After parts of two seasons with Biel, MacMurchy signed in the German DEL, agreeing to a one-year deal with ERC Ingolstadt on June 27, 2014. In the 2014–15 season, MacMurchy helped the club return to the Championship finals, however was injured during the post-season. In 42 regular season games he contributed with 52 points, placing second on the team.

On June 10, 2015, MacMurchy signed a two-year deal with fellow DEL competitors, Adler Mannheim.

After four seasons in the DEL, MacMurchy left as a free agent to return to Switzerland, agreeing to a one-year deal with EHC Kloten of the Swiss League on July 6, 2018.

== Career statistics ==
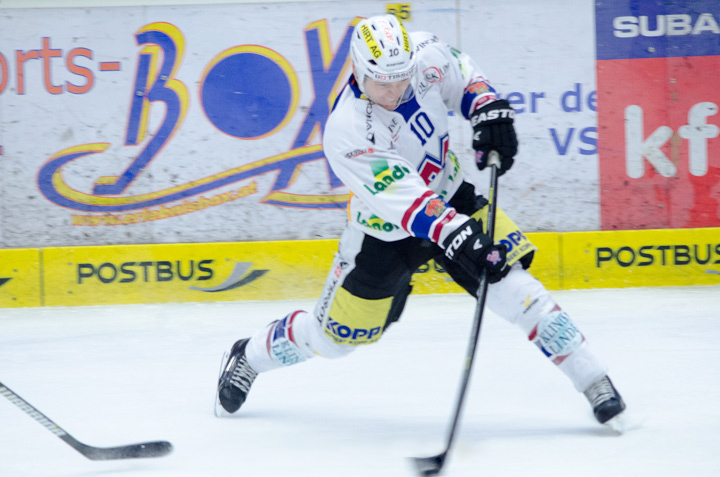
MacMurchy during his tenure with EHC Biel.

			Regular season					Playoffs
Season	Team	League	GP	G	A	Pts	PIM	GP	G	A	Pts	PIM
1998–99	Regina Pat Canadians AAA	SMHL	40	17	18	35	42	10	1	6	7	4
1999–2000	Regina Pat Canadians AAA	SMHL	38	23	41	64	122	4	2	3	5	6
2000–01	Vernon Vipers	BCHL	55	4	16	20	27	—	—	—	—	—
2001–02	Notre Dame Hounds	SJHL	61	32	52	84	63	11	2	5	7	13
2002–03	University of Wisconsin	WCHA	39	10	14	24	69	—	—	—	—	—
2003–04	University of Wisconsin	WCHA	43	15	13	28	95	—	—	—	—	—
2004–05	University of Wisconsin	WCHA	40	11	22	33	88	—	—	—	—	—
2005–06	University of Wisconsin	WCHA	42	8	17	25	90	—	—	—	—	—
2006–07	Alaska Aces	ECHL	18	4	6	10	52	15	4	1	5	63
2006–07	Peoria Rivermen	AHL	24	4	1	5	20	—	—	—	—	—
2007–08	Stockton Thunder	ECHL	45	23	22	45	67	—	—	—	—	—
2008–09	Stockton Thunder	ECHL	33	9	17	26	60	—	—	—	—	—
2009–10	Springfield Falcons	AHL	56	2	12	14	38	—	—	—	—	—
2010–11	Victoria Salmon Kings	ECHL	39	16	17	33	54	3	1	0	1	4
2010–11	Abbotsford Heat	AHL	56	2	12	14	38	—	—	—	—	—
2011–12	Stavanger Oilers	NOR	44	37	39	76	138	13	9	12	21	38
2012–13	HC Red Ice	SUI.2	24	18	12	30	81	—	—	—	—	—
2012–13	EHC Biel	NLA	7	7	3	10	2	3	1	1	2	27
2013–14	EHC Biel	NLA	40	11	8	19	28	—	—	—	—	—
2014–15	ERC Ingolstadt	DEL	42	21	31	52	68	9	2	4	6	10
2015–16	Adler Mannheim	DEL	52	21	20	41	48	2	0	0	0	0
2016–17	Adler Mannheim	DEL	21	8	15	23	16	6	1	2	3	4
2017–18	Adler Mannheim	DEL	22	5	11	16	6	1	0	0	0	0
2018–19	EHC Kloten	SUI.2	24	13	15	28	32	—	—	—	—	—
ECHL totals			135	52	62	124	233	18	5	1	6	40
AHL totals			98	11	15	26	81	—	—	—	—	—
DEL totals			137	55	77	132	138	18	3	6	9	14
