= Marcus Olsson (ice hockey) =

Swedish ice hockey player

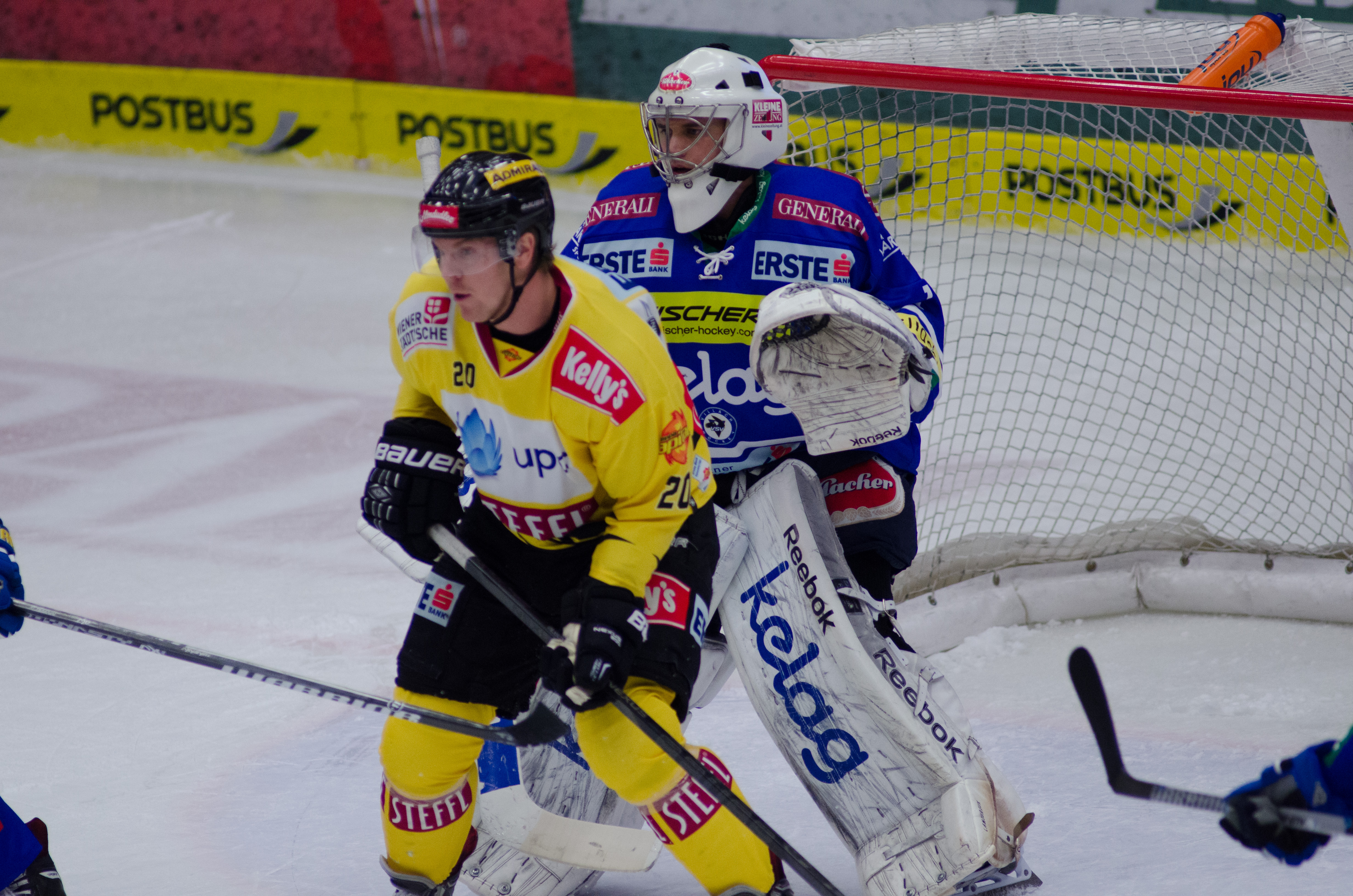
- Born: September 25, 1986 (age 39) Trelleborg, Sweden
- Height: 1.89 m (6 ft 2 in)
- Weight: 94 kg (207 lb; 14 st 11 lb)
- Position: Centre/Left wing
- Shoots: Left
- Metal team Former teams: Rungsted Seier Capital; Malmö Redhawks; HK Jesenice; Sparta Warriors; Vienna Capitals; HC TWK Innsbruck; Frederikshavn White Hawks
- Playing career: 2004–present

Marcus Olsson (born 25 September 1986) is a Swedish professional ice hockey centre playing for Rungsted Seier Capital of the Metal Ligaen. He was previously signed by Austrian club, HC TWK Innsbruck of the EBEL to a one-year contract on April 25, 2014. He returned to EBEL after playing completing his second stint with youth club Malmö Redhawks in Swedish HockeyAllsvenskan. On July 16, 2015, Olsson left the Austrian league as a free agent and signed his first contract in Denmark with Frederikshavn White Hawks of the Metal Ligaen.
