= Lars Løkken Østli =

Norwegian ice hockey player

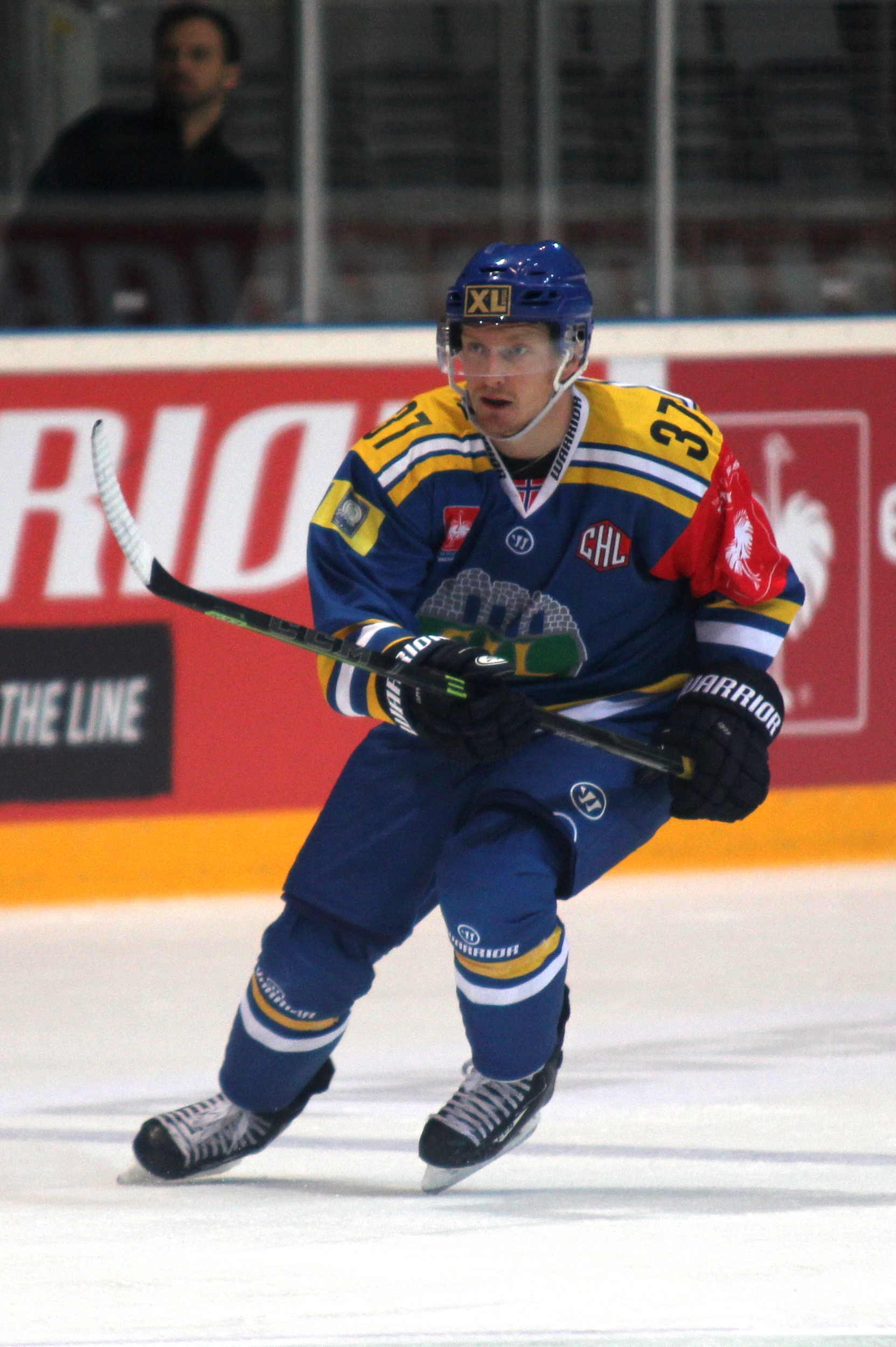
- Lars Løkken Østli in 2015
- Born: November 21, 1986 (age 38) Hamar, Norway
- Height: 5 ft 11 in (180 cm)
- Weight: 192 lb (87 kg; 13 st 10 lb)
- Position: Defence
- Shot: Right
- Played for: Storhamar Dragons; Luleå HF
- National team: Norway
- Playing career: 2005–2019

Lars Løkken Østli (born November 21, 1986) is a Norwegian former professional ice hockey defenceman. He played for Storhamar Dragons of the Norwegian GET-ligaen.
