= Fredrik Lystad Jacobsen =

Norwegian ice hockey player

- Born: 15 February 1990 (age 35) Asker, Norway
- Height: 5 ft 11 in (180 cm)
- Weight: 190 lb (86 kg; 13 st 8 lb)
- Position: Forward
- Shoots: Left
- GET-ligaen team Former teams: Frisk Asker; Storhamar Dragons; Sparta Warriors
- National team: Norway
- Playing career: 2010–present

Fredrik Lystad Jacobsen (born February 15, 1990) is a Norwegian professional ice hockey player. He was a member of the Norwegian squad at the 2014 Winter Olympics.
