= Ryan Nie =

Canadian ice hockey player

- Born: April 15, 1985 (age 41) Nanticoke, Ontario, Canada
- Height: 6 ft 1 in (185 cm)
- Weight: 165 lb (75 kg; 11 st 11 lb)
- Position: Goaltender
- Caught: Left
- Played for: Kalamazoo Wings; Johnstown Chiefs; Providence Bruins; Bakersfield Condors; Cincinnati Cyclones; Elmira Jackals; Milwaukee Admirals; Houston Aeros; Lillehammer IK; Beibarys Atyrau; ETC Crimmitschau; Braehead Clan
- NHL draft: undrafted
- Playing career: 2006–2018

Ryan Nie (born April 15, 1985) is a Canadian former professional ice hockey goaltender.

== Career ==
Nie started his professional career with the Kalamazoo Wings of the UHL, signing with the team prior to the 2006-07 season as a backup to former longtime Rochester Americans goaltender Tom Askey. While Askey saw the majority of the team's starts, it was Nie who led the team with a league-record 2.02 GAA and a .929 save percentage. Nie ended up taking over the starting duties during the postseason, leading the K-Wings to the UHL Finals and posting a 2.73 goals-against average over 19 games. Upon the completion of the season, Nie was named to the UHL All-Rookie Team

The following season, Nie signed with the Johnstown Chiefs of the ECHL. He was named ECHL goaltender of the week twice during the season: the week of October 22–28, 2007 and the week of March 24–30, 2008. He was also briefly signed to a PTO contract by the Providence Bruins on November 25, 2007, playing in one game and allowing two goals in forty-three minutes of game time in relief of Bruins' goalie Mike Brown. Nie was released from his PTO contract on November 28, 2007. Nie went 29-12-4 with the Chiefs, breaking the former record held by former Chiefs' goaltenders Stan "Smokey" Reddick (1991–92) and Frederic Deschênes (2001–02).

Nie spent the 2008-09 season in the ECHL but split time between three teams: the Bakersfield Condors, Elmira Jackals before completing the season with the Cincinnati Cyclones. Nie led the Cyclones to the conference Finals but lost the series 4-0 to the eventual Kelly Cup champions South Carolina Stingrays.

Nie started the 2009-10 season as a member of the San Jose Sharks training camp before being sent to San Jose's AHL affiliate in Worcester. Nie was eventually assigned to Kalamazoo; the same team he started his professional career with, except that Kalamazoo was now a member of the ECHL. Nie would be recalled by several teams during the 2009-10 season (Portland Pirates, Worcester Sharks, and the Houston Aeros), but Nie would only see ice time during one of the recalls. On February 5, 2010, Nie signed a PTO contract with the Houston Aeros due to the injury of Aeros' goaltender Josh Harding. The following night, Nie started in goal for the Aeros but surrendered five goals on nineteen shots. Nie was released from his PTO contract the following day and returned to Kalamazoo for the remainder of the season. Nie returned to the Wings and led the team in wins (28) and shutouts (3). At the conclusion of the regular season, Nie was named the Kalamazoo Gazette's 2009-10 Most Valuable Player.

Nie signed an extension with the Wings on August 10, 2010, returning to the club for a third season. Nie was loaned to the Binghamton Senators on December 29, 2010. Nie dressed as a backup for two games but did not play. He was released from his PTO contract on January 6, 2011. Nie returned to the Wings and once again led the team in games played (52), goals against (2.80), and set a personal best in regular season wins (30). At the conclusion of the season, Nie was named the Wings Most Valuable Player. Nie led the Wings to the Kelly Cup finals, but would eventually lose to the Alaska Aces four games to one.

On June 20, 2011, Nie agreed to a one-year contract with Lillehammer IK of the Norwegian GET-ligaen. In an interview held by the team, Nie said talked to a former teammate who had played in Norway and said it was a good experience and recommended it to him. He had his contract renewed for the following 2012-13 season.

In 2013, Nie had a short stint with Beibarys Atyrau of Kazakhstan and then headed to Germany. In January 2014, he signed with DEL2 side Eispiraten Crimmitschau.

After three and a half years with ETC Crimmitschau, Nie moved to the UK to sign for Elite Ice Hockey League (EIHL) side Braehead Clan in June 2017 for what was his final season before retiring.

== Personal ==
- Nie's favorite player is former NHL goaltender Andy Moog, but has admitted that he chose his number #35 due to Tom Barrasso.
- Nie has a fiancé (Allison) and a dog (Lewis).
- In the offseason, Nie works for a local concrete company as a driver.
