= Lørenskog Ishall =

Ice hockey arena in Lørenskog, Norway

Coordinates: 59.927356°N 10.962145°E

Lørenskog Ishall is an indoor ice hockey arena located in Lørenskog, Norway. The capacity of the arena is 2,450 and it was opened in 1984. It is the home arena of the Lørenskog ice hockey team. A new rink was installed in 2007.
