= 2012–13 GET-ligaen season =

- League: GET-ligaen
- Sport: Ice hockey
- Duration: 13 September 2012 –present
- Number of teams: 10
- TV partner(s): TV 2 Sport

Regular season
- League champions: Vålerenga
- Season MVP: Christian Dahl-Andersen
- Top scorer: Christian Dahl-Andersen

Playoffs
- Norwegian champions: Stavanger Oilers
- Playoffs MVP: Henrik Holm

GET-ligaen seasons
- ← 2011–12 2013–14 →

The 2012–13 GET-ligaen was the 74th season of Norway's premier ice hockey league, Eliteserien (known as GET-ligaen for sponsorship reasons).

== Regular season ==
=== Final standings ===
Team	GP	W	OTW/SOW	OTL/SOL	L	GF	GA	Pts
Vålerenga (C)	45	30	3	3	9	184	124	99
Stavanger Oilers	45	29	1	3	12	198	112	92
Lørenskog	45	28	2	1	14	200	127	89
Sparta Warriors	45	19	8	5	13	151	136	78
Lillehammer	45	23	1	1	20	151	130	72
Frisk Asker	45	20	5	2	18	141	135	72
Storhamar Dragons	45	16	4	4	21	139	155	60
Stjernen	45	13	2	4	26	130	181	47
Rosenborg	45	9	3	6	27	132	196	39
Tønsberg Vikings	45	5	4	4	32	126	256	27

GP = Games played; W = Wins; L = Losses; OTW = Overtime Wins; OTL = Overtime losses; SOW = Shootout Wins; SOL = Shootout losses; GF = Goals for; GA = Goals against; Pts = Points; C = Champions
Source: pointstreak.com

=== Scoring leaders ===
These were the top ten skaters based on points. If the list exceeds ten skaters because of a tie in points, all of the tied skaters are shown.

Player	Team	GP	G	A	Pts	+/–	PIM
Christian Dahl-Andersen	Stavanger Oilers	45	26	52	78	+38	20
Justin Donati	Vålerenga	44	37	32	69	+27	40
James Sixsmith	Lørenskog	43	31	36	67	+26	56
Martin Strandfeldt	Stavanger Oilers	45	31	33	64	+31	68
Brad Schell	Lillehammer	44	15	49	64	-2	52
Lou Dickenson	Rosenborg	44	28	34	62	-3	28
Kenny Corupe	Lørenskog	45	25	36	61	+29	38
Tyler Donati	Vålerenga	39	18	42	60	+25	18
Juha-Pekka Loikas	Stavanger Oilers	44	21	38	59	+43	38
Knut Henrik Spets	Lørenskog	42	15	40	55	+21	80

=== Leading goaltenders ===
These were the top five goaltenders based on goals against average.

Player	Team	GP	TOI	W	L	GA	SO	Sv%	GAA
Henrik Holm	Stavanger Oilers	17	907:51	12	4	35	2	.918	2.31
Ruben Smith	Stavanger Oilers	32	1740:43	18	10	68	1	.913	2.34
Steffen Søberg	Vålerenga	42	2448:59	31	10	100	3	.915	2.45
Ryan Nie	Lillehammer	45	2694:27	24	21	123	4	.904	2.74
Nicklas Dahlberg	Frisk Asker	43	2557:01	25	18	118	3	.910	2.77

=== Attendance ===
Team	Arena	Capacity	Total	Games	Average	% of Capacity
Frisk Tigers	Askerhallen	2,400	21,760	22	989	41.2%
Stavanger Oilers	DNB Arena	4,377	84,249	23	3,663	83.7%
Storhamar Dragons	Hamar OL-Amfi	6,091	36,510	22	1,659	27.2%
Vålerenga	Jordal Amfi	4,450	46,108	23	2,004	45.0%
Lillehammer	Kristins Hall	3,194	32,141	22	1,460	45.7%
Rosenborg	Leangen Ishall	3,000	39,100	23	1,700	56.7%
Lørenskog	Lørenskog Ishall	1,350	23,363	22	1,061	78.6%
Sparta Warriors	Sparta Amfi	3,450	48,482	23	2,107	61.1%
Stjernen	Stjernehallen	2,473	26,640	22	1,210	48.9%
Tønsberg Vikings	Tønsberg Ishall	500	9,483	23	412	82.4%

Total	Games	Average
367,836	225	1,634

Source:pointstreak.com

== Playoffs ==
After the regular season, the standard of eight teams qualified for the playoffs. In the first and second rounds, the highest remaining seed chooses which of the two lowest remaining seeds to be matched against. In each round the higher-seeded team is awarded home ice advantage. Each best-of-seven series follows a 1–1–1–1–1–1–1 format: the higher-seeded team plays at home for games 1 and 3 (plus 5 and 7 if necessary), and the lower-seeded team at home for games 2, 4 and 6 (if necessary).

=== Bracket ===
Quarter-finals
1	Vålerenga	4
8	Stjernen	0
2	Stavanger Oilers	4
6	Frisk Asker	1
(Pairings are reseeded after the first round)
3	Lørenskog	4
5	Lillehammer	2
4	Sparta Warriors	4
7	Storhamar Dragons	2

Semi-finals
1	Vålerenga	4
4	Sparta Warriors	1
2	Stavanger Oilers	4
3	Lørenskog	2

Finals
1	Vålerenga	2
2	Stavanger Oilers	4

Source: pointstreak.com

Norwegian Champions
2013
Stavanger Oilers
3rd title

== Qualification ==
After the regular season had ended, the two lowest ranked teams in the league and the two highest ranked teams in the 1. divisjon competed for the right to play in the 2013–14 GET-ligaen. Comet, Ringerike Panthers, Rosenborg and the Tønsberg Vikings took part. The tournament was played from 7 March to 24 March 2013 and was organized according to a double round robin format: each club played the others twice, home and away, for a total of six games. The points system and ranking method used were the same as in the GET-ligaen.

=== Final standings ===
Team	GP	W	OTW/SOW	OTL/SOL	L	GF	GA	Pts
Rosenborg	6	4	0	1	1	18	15	13
Tønsberg Vikings	6	4	0	0	2	27	15	12
Ringerike Panthers	6	2	0	1	3	15	23	7
Comet	6	0	2	0	4	15	22	4

GP = Games played; W = Wins; L = Losses; OTW = Overtime Wins; OTL = Overtime losses; SOW = Shootout Wins; SOL = Shootout losses; GF = Goals for; GA = Goals against; Pts = Points
Source: hockey.no

== Awards ==
All-Star team

The following players were selected to the 2012–13 GET-ligaen All-Star team:

- Goaltender: Steffen Søberg (Vålerenga)
- Defenseman: Craig Schira (Frisk)
- Defenseman: Timothy Kunes (Stavanger)
- Center: Christian Dahl-Andersen (Stavanger)
- Winger: Tyler Donati (Vålerenga)
- Winger: Justin Donati (Vålerenga)

Other

- Player of the year: Christian Dahl-Andersen (Stavanger)
- Coach of the year: Sune Bergman (Frisk)
- Playoff MVP: Henrik Holm (Stavanger)
