= Lørenskog IK =

Lørenskog Ishockeyklubb
- City: Lørenskog, Norway
- League: 1. divjsion
- Founded: 1963; 63 years ago
- Home arena: Lørenskog Ishall
- Colors: Red, navy and white
- General manager: Stig Atle Johnsen
- Head coach: Niklas Andresen
- Captain: Kristoffer Pihlqvist
- Website: http://www.lik.no/

Lørenskog Ishockeyklubb (founded in 1963) is a Norwegian professional ice hockey team based in Lørenskog, Norway. The team competed in GET-ligaen from 2008 to 2018. In May 2018, the club did not receive a new licence, due to long-term economic problems. The team got promoted back to the EliteHockey Ligaen, and then relegated to the 1. divjsion, in 2026.

== Season-by-season results ==
This is a partial list of the last ten seasons completed by Lørenskog. For the full season-by-season history, see List of Lørenskog IK seasons.

Norwegian Champions	Regular Season Champions	Promoted	Relegated

Season	League	Regular season									Postseason
Season	League	GP	W	L	OTW	OTL	GF	GA	Pts	Finish	Postseason
2013–14	Eliteserien	45	25	13	4	3	184	137	66	5th	Lost in Quarter-finals, 1–4 (Lillehammer)
2014–15	Eliteserien	45	22	15	4	4	150	123	78	4th	Lost in Quarter-finals, 2–4 (Sparta)
2015–16	Eliteserien	45	29	11	3	2	162	106	95	2nd	Lost in Finals, 2–4 (Stavanger)
2016–17	Eliteserien	45	26	11	4	4	158	100	90	2nd	Lost in Quarter-finals, 3–4 (Lillehammer)
2017–18	Eliteserien	45	11	25	4	5	118	165	46	8th	Lost in Quarter-finals, 0–4 (Storhamar)
2018–19	2. divisjon	18	17	0	1	0	165	27	53	1st	
2019–20	1. divisjon	40	32	8	3	2	177	86	95	1st	Cancelled due to the COVID-19 pandemic
2020–21	1. divisjon	26	20	3	2	1	129	56	65	2nd	Cancelled due to the COVID-19 pandemic
2021–22	1. divisjon	30	20	7	1	2	149	91	64	2nd	Lost in Qualifying for Eliteserien
2022–23	1. divisjon	35	18	11	4	0	136	91	65	3rd	2nd in Qualifying for Eliteserien

== Famous players ==
Canada

- Marco Charpentier
- Jason Krog
- Andrew Martin
- Dominic Noël

United States

- Dan LaCouture

Norway

- Tommy Jakobsen
- Lars Haugen
- Mats Trygg
- Roy Johansen
