= 2008 WCHA men's ice hockey tournament =

2008 WCHA Men's ice hockey tournament
- 2008 WCHA Final Five logo
- Dates: March 14–22, 2008
- Teams: 10
- Finals site: Xcel Energy Center; St. Paul, Minnesota
- Champions: Denver (15th title)
- Winning coach: George Gwozdecky (4th title)
- MVP: Alex Kangas (Minnesota)
- WCHA Men's Ice Hockey Tournaments

The 2008 WCHA Men's Ice Hockey Tournament was the 49th conference playoff in league history and 54th season where a WCHA champion was crowned. The 2008 tournament was played between March 14 and March 22, 2008, at five conference arenas and the Xcel Energy Center in St. Paul, Minnesota. By winning the tournament, Denver was awarded the Broadmoor Trophy and received the Western Collegiate Hockey Association's automatic bid to the 2008 NCAA Men's Division I Ice Hockey Tournament.

== Format ==
The first round of the postseason tournament featured a best-of-three games format. All ten conference teams participated in the tournament. Teams were seeded No. 1 through No. 10 according to their final conference standing, with a tiebreaker system used to seed teams with an identical number of points accumulated. The top five seeded teams each earned home ice and hosted one of the lower seeded teams.

The winners of the first round series advanced to the Xcel Energy Center for the WCHA Final Five, the collective name for the quarterfinal, semifinal, and championship rounds. The Final Five uses a single-elimination format. Teams were re-seeded No. 1 through No. 5 according to the final regular season conference standings, with the top three teams automatically advancing to the semifinals.

=== Conference standings ===
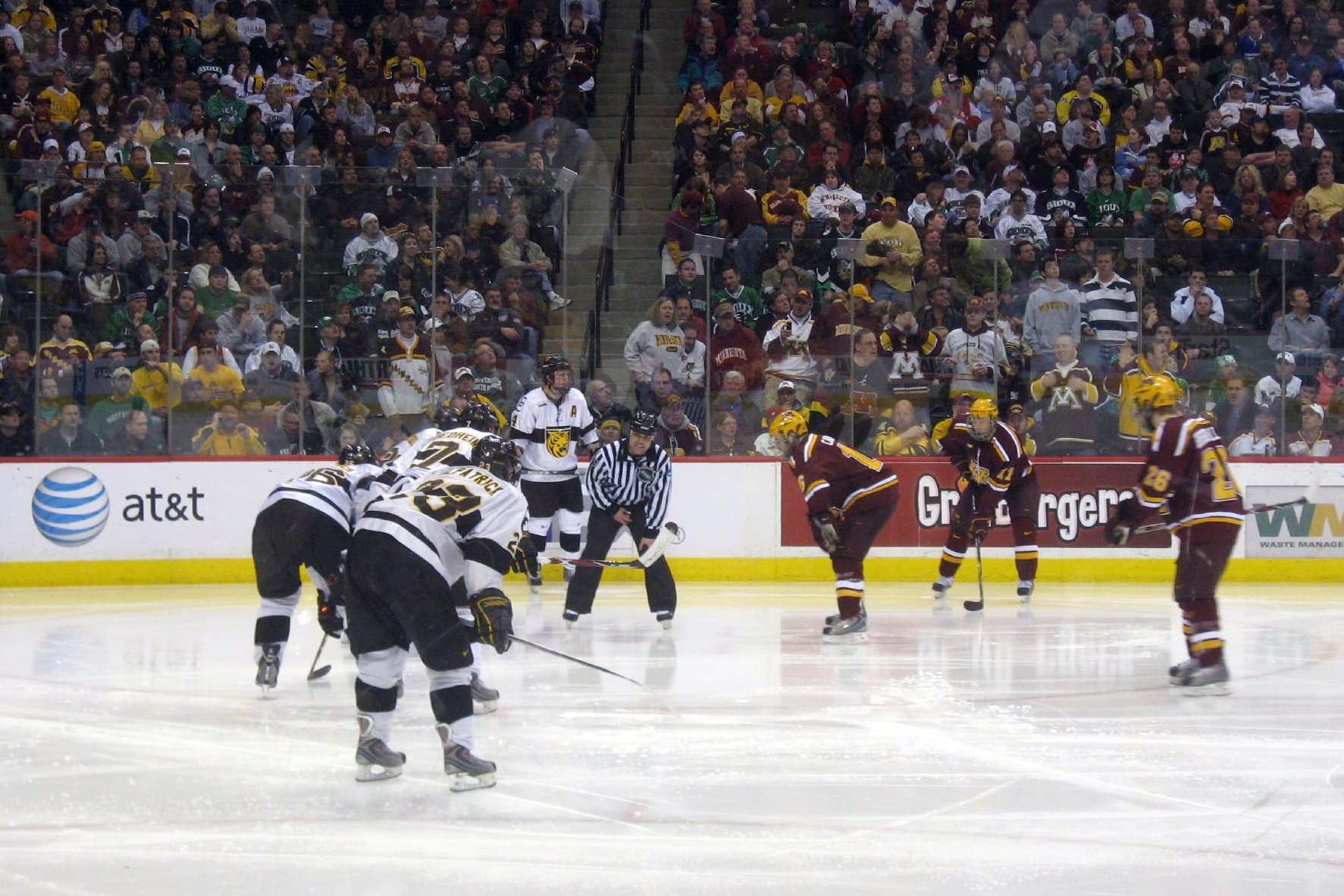
Colorado College versus the University of Minnesota

Note: GP = Games played; W = Wins; L = Losses; T = Ties; PTS = Points; GF = Goals For; GA = Goals Against

2007–08 Western Collegiate Hockey Association standings
	Conference							Overall					
	GP	W	L	T	PTS	GF	GA	GP	W	L	T	GF	GA
#8 Colorado College†	28	21	6	1	43	95	52	41	28	12	1	136	88
#4 North Dakota	28	18	7	3	39	85	53	43	28	11	4	129	80
#9 Denver*	28	16	11	1	33	75	67	41	26	14	1	116	94
#15 Minnesota State	28	12	12	4	28	71	75	39	19	16	4	106	97
#14 St. Cloud State	28	12	12	4	28	79	74	40	19	16	5	118	94
#13 Wisconsin	28	11	12	5	27	68	68	40	16	17	7	114	102
#12 Minnesota	28	9	12	7	25	64	70	45	19	17	9	109	109
Minnesota–Duluth	28	9	14	5	23	55	76	36	13	17	6	74	91
Michigan Tech	28	9	15	4	22	55	77	39	14	20	5	78	99
Alaska–Anchorage	28	3	19	6	12	54	89	36	7	21	8	81	112
Championship: Denver † indicates conference regular season champion * indicates conference tournament champion Final rankings: USA Today/USA Hockey Magazine Top 15 Poll

==== Tiebreakers ====
- Minnesota State and St. Cloud State each finished the regular season with 28 points. Minnesota State won the tiebreaker, having the better head-to-head record of the two teams.

== Bracket ==
Teams are reseeded after the first round

First round March 14–16, 2008
1	Colorado College	4	3*	—
10	Alaska-Anchorage	1	2	—
2	North Dakota	4	2	2
9	Michigan Tech	0	3*	1
3	Denver	6	1	—
8	Minnesota-Duluth	3	0	—
4	Minnesota State	1**	1	2
7	Minnesota	0	2*	3**
5	St. Cloud State	3	4*	—
6	Wisconsin	0	3	—

Quarterfinal; March 20, 2008
5	St. Cloud State	2
7	Minnesota	3

Semifinals; March 21, 2008
1	Colorado College	1
7	Minnesota	2*
2	North Dakota	1
3	Denver	3

Championship; March 22, 2008
3	Denver	2
7	Minnesota	1

Note: * denotes overtime period(s)

=== First round ===
==== (1) Colorado College vs. (10) Alaska-Anchorage ====
March 14	Colorado College	4 – 1	Alaska-Anchorage	World Arena	Recap
(Sweatt, Hillen) Mike Testwuide - 00:37		First period	No Scoring
(Hillen) Tyler Johnson - GW - 18:06		Second period	02:15 - PP - Brad McCabe (Lunden, Lafranchise)
(Johnson) Scott Thauwald - 02:47 (unassisted) Scott McCulloch - EN - 19:39		Third period	No scoring
( 27 saves / 28 shots ) Richard Bachman		Goalie stats	Jon Olthuis ( 16 saves / 19 shots )

March 15	Colorado College	3 – 2	OT	Alaska-Anchorage	World Arena	Recap
No Scoring		First period		06:05 - Kane Lafranchise (Parkinson, Lunden)
(Testwuide, Kilpatrick) Bill Sweatt - 04:22		Second period		16:37 - Josh Lunden (Crowder)
(Rau, Prosser) Mike Testwuide - 05:54		Third period		No scoring
(Sweatt, Hillen) Mike Testwuide - 02:58		First overtime period		No scoring
( 18 saves / 20 shots ) Richard Bachman		Goalie stats		Jon Olthuis ( 27 saves / 30 shots )

Colorado College won series 2–0

==== (2) North Dakota vs. (9) Michigan Tech ====
March 14	North Dakota	4 – 0	Michigan Tech	Ralph Engelstad Arena	Recap
(Oshie, Genoway) Ryan Duncan - GW - 05:25		First period	No scoring
(Duncan, VandeVelde) T. J. Oshie - 08:21 (Marto, Genoway) Darcy Zajac - 09:10		Second period	No scoring
(Miller, Martens) Andrew Kozek - 06:58		Third period	No scoring
( 14 saves / 14 shots ) Jean-Philippe Lamoureux		Goalie stats	Michael-Lee Teslak ( 27 saves / 31 shots )

March 15	North Dakota	2 – 3	OT	Michigan Tech	Ralph Engelstad Arena	Recap
(Frattin, Martens) Brad Miller - 04:19		First period		No scoring
(Miller) Matt Frattin - 16:58		Second period		No scoring
No scoring		Third period		01:19 - PP - Jimmy Kerr (Kinrade, Kattelus); 19:54 - SH - Tyler Shelast (Kerr, Baker)
No scoring		First overtime period		01:59 - GW PP - Tyler Shelast (Kinrade, Rouleau)
( 23 saves / 26 shots ) Jean-Philippe Lamoureux		Goalie stats		Michael-Lee Teslak ( 24 saves / 26 shots )

March 16	North Dakota	2 – 1	Michigan Tech	Ralph Engelstad Arena	Recap
(Duncan, Genoway) T. J. Oshie - 14:09		First period	11:27 - Tyler Shelast (Gagne)
(Bina, Chorney)T. J. Oshie - 00:19		Second period	No scoring
No scoring		Third period	No scoring
( 10 saves / 11 shots ) Jean-Philippe Lamoureux		Goalie stats	Michael-Lee Teslak ( 22 saves / 24 shots )

North Dakota won series 2–1

==== (3) Denver vs. (8) Minnesota–Duluth ====
March 14	Denver	6 – 3	Minnesota–Duluth	Magness Arena	Recap
(Vossberg, Thomas) Dustin Jackson - 02:15 (May, Testwuide) Dustin Jackson - 04:58		First period	No scoring
(Jackson) Matt Glasser - 09:29 (Ostrow) Tyler Bozak - GW PP - 13:39		Second period	08:23 - PP - Andrew Carroll (Curry, Akins) 14:24 - Mike Curry (Bordson, Greer)
(Testwuide) Tyler Bozak - 00:23 (unassisted) Cody Brookwell - 07:50		Third period	05:55 - PP - Josh Meyers (Bordson, McKnight)
( 24 saves / 27 shots ) Peter Mannino		Goalie stats	Alex Stalock ( 22 saves / 28 shots )

March 15	Denver	1 – 0	Minnesota–Duluth	Magness Arena	Recap
No Scoring		First period	No scoring
(unassisted) Anthony Maiani - GW - 07:44		Second period	No scoring
No scoring		Third period	No scoring
( 25 saves / 25 shots ) Peter Mannino		Goalie stats	Alex Stalock ( 14 saves / 15 shots )

Denver won series 2–0

==== (4) Minnesota State vs. (7) Minnesota ====
March 14	Minnesota State	1 – 0	2OT	Minnesota	Verizon Center	Recap
No Scoring		First period		No scoring
No scoring		Second period		No scoring
No scoring		Third period		No scoring
(Kalinski) Trevor Bruess - 17:36		Second overtime period		No scoring
( 34 saves / 34 shots ) Mike Zacharias		Goalie stats		Alex Kangas ( 44 saves / 45 shots )

March 15	Minnesota State	1 – 2	OT	Minnesota	Verizon Center	Recap
No Scoring		First period		06:07 - Justin Bostrom (Pohl, Wehrs)
No scoring		Second period		No scoring
(Irwin, Hanson) Andrew Sackrison - 11:09		Third period		No scoring
No scoring		First overtime period		07:33 - Mike Carman (Peltier)
( 35 saves / 37 shots ) Mike Zacharias		Goalie stats		Alex Kangas ( 27 saves / 28 shots )

March 16	Minnesota State	2 – 3	2OT	Minnesota	Verizon Center	Recap
(Davis, Irwin) Mick Berge - 08:38		First period		18:12 - Jay Barriball (Wheeler, Gordon)
No scoring		Second period		13:51 - Patrick White (Howe, Lucia)
(Bruess, Youds) Kael Mouillierat - 03:20		Third period		No scoring
No scoring		Second overtime period		16:59 - Tony Lucia (Kaufmann, Flynn)
( 47 saves / 50 shots ) Mike Zacharias		Goalie stats		Alex Kangas ( 44 saves / 46 shots )

Minnesota won series 2–1

==== (5) St. Cloud State vs. (6) Wisconsin ====
March 14	St. Cloud State	3 – 0	Wisconsin	National Hockey Center	Recap
(Nödl, Roe) John Swanson - GW PP - 19:29		First period	No scoring
(Borgen) Ryan Lasch - 17:42		Second period	No scoring
(Dey, Roe) Andreas Nödl - 10:03		Third period	No scoring
( 24 saves / 24 shots ) Jase Weslosky		Goalie stats	Shane Connelly ( 28 saves / 31 shots )

March 15	St. Cloud State	4 – 3	OT	Wisconsin	National Hockey Center	Recap
(Lasch, Swanson) Aaron Brocklehurst - 00:26 (Brocklehurst, Marvin) Matt Stephenson - GW - 17:17		First period		05:24 - Blake Geoffrion (Turris, Davies)
(Roe, Nödl) John Swanson - PP - 14:58		Second period		00:51 - Davis Drewiske (Klubertanz, Geoffrion); 06:02 - Aaron Bendickson (McBain, Turris)
No scoring		Third period		No scoring
(Raboin) Ryan Lasch - GW - 03:57		First overtime period		No scoring
( 46 saves / 47 shots ) Jake Weslosky		Goalie stats		Shane Connelly ( 7 saves / 9 shots ) / Scott Gudmandson ( 10 saves / 12 shots )

St. Cloud State won series 2–0

=== Quarterfinal ===
==== (5) St. Cloud State vs. (7) Minnesota ====
March 20	St. Cloud State	2 – 3	Minnesota	Xcel Energy Center	Recap
(Lasch, Brocklehurst) Garrett Raboin - PP - 07:33		First period	00:25 - Tony Lucia (Kaufmann, Peltier)
No scoring		Second period	04:35 - PP - Evan Kaufmann (Wheeler, Fairchild)
(Peltier, Fischer) Mike Howe - GW - 19:47		Third period	15:34 - Tony Mosey (Lasch, Raboin)
( 26 saves / 29 shots ) Jase Weslosky		Goalie stats	Alex Kangas ( 25 saves / 27 shots )

=== Semifinals ===
==== (1) Colorado College vs. (7) Minnesota ====
March 21	Colorado College	1 – 2	OT	Minnesota	Xcel Energy Center	Recap
No Scoring		First period		No scoring
(Hillen, Prosser) Andreas Vlassopoulos - 00:39		Second period		01:38 - Mike Hoeffel (Barriball)
No scoring		Third period		No scoring
No scoring		First overtime period		04:47 - Mike Hoeffel (Carman, Wehrs)
( 33 saves / 35 shots ) Richard Bachman		Goalie stats		Alex Kangas ( 37 saves / 38 shots )

==== (2) North Dakota vs. (3) Denver ====
March 21	North Dakota	1 – 3	Denver	Xcel Energy Center	Recap
No Scoring		First period	No scoring
No scoring		Second period	05:58 - PP - Rhett Rakhshani (Mullen, Bozak)
(Zajac, Marto) Taylor Chorney - 06:16		Third period	18:40 - GW - Anthony Maiani (unassisted); 19:54 - EN - Matt Glasser (Ruegsegger)
( 29 saves / 35 shots ) Bobby Goepfert		Goalie stats	Philippe Lamoureux ( 25 saves / 27 shots )

=== Third Place ===
==== (1) Colorado College vs. (2) North Dakota ====
March 22	Colorado College	2 – 4	North Dakota	Xcel Energy Center	Recap
(Testwuide) Chad Rau - 07:56		First period	19:20 - PP - T. J. Oshie (Chorney, VandeVelde)
(Connelly, Lowery) Jimmy Kilpatrick - PP - 16:36		Second period	05:01 - PP - Chris VandeVelde (Chorney, Oshie); 10:27 - GW PP - Chay Genoway (Marto, Malone)
No scoring		Third period	10:02 - Darcy Zajac (Radke, Marto)
( 31 saves / 35 shots ) Richard Bachman		Goalie stats	Jean-Philippe Lamoureux ( 33 saves / 25 shots )

=== Championship ===
==== (3) Denver vs. (7) Minnesota ====
March 22	Denver	2 – 1	Minnesota	Xcel Energy Center	Recap
No Scoring		First period	No scoring
(Rakhshani) Tyler Bozak - 09:10 (Maiani, Martin) Tom May - GW - 19:34		Second period	05:39 - Ryan Flynn (Bickel, Fairchild)
No scoring		Third period	No scoring
( 34 saves / 35 shots ) Peter Mannino		Goalie stats	Alex Kangas ( 32 saves / 34 shots )

== Tournament awards ==
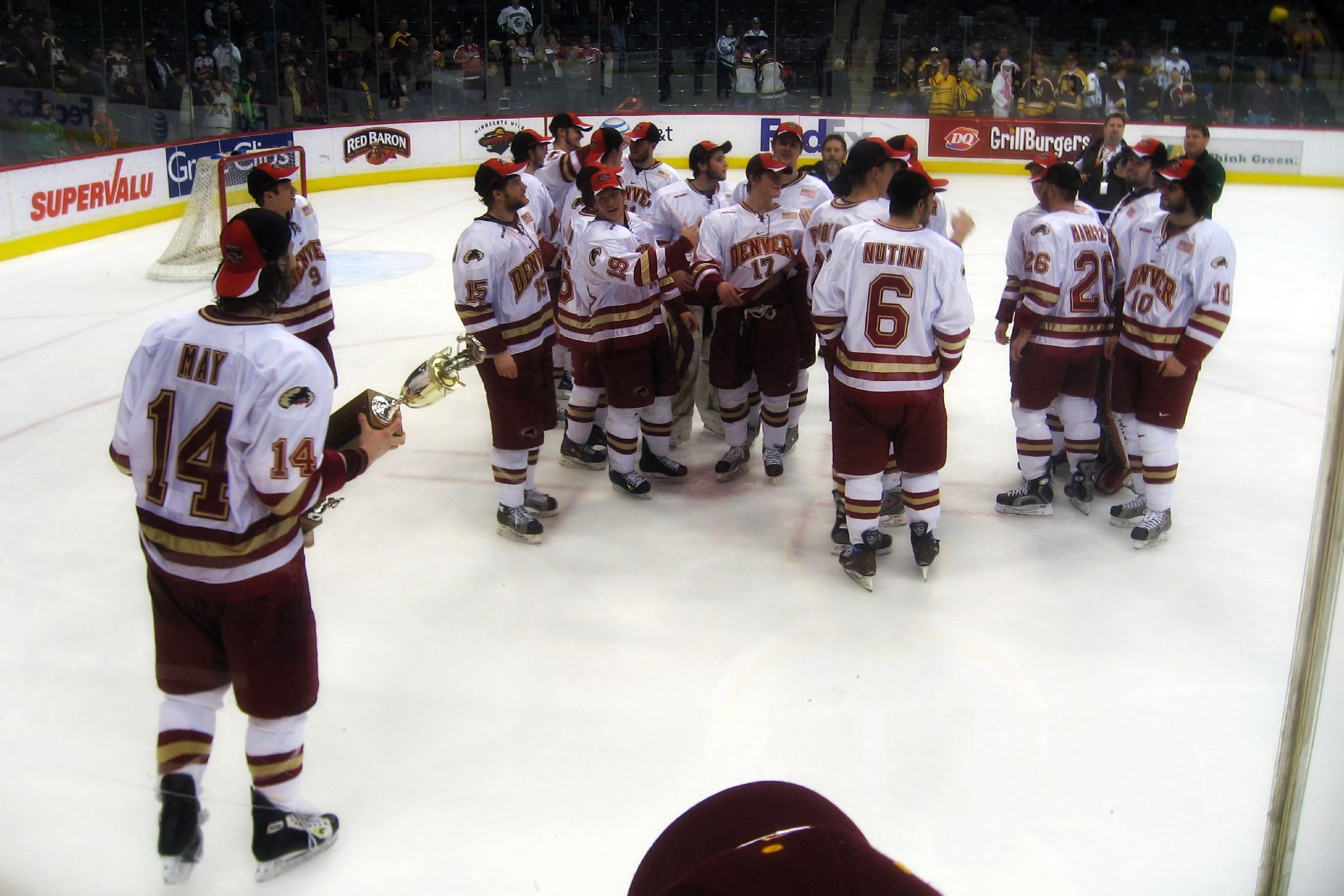
Members of the Denver Pioneers celebrating their tournament victory

=== All-Tournament Team ===
- F Mike Hoeffel (Minnesota)
- F Tom May (Denver)
- F T. J. Oshie (North Dakota)
- D Chris Butler (Denver)
- D Taylor Chorney (North Dakota)
- G Peter Mannino (Denver)

=== MVP ===
Alex Kangas, (Minnesota)

== See also ==
- Western Collegiate Hockey Association men's champions
