= 2024–25 EliteHockey Ligaen season =

2024–25 EliteHockey Ligaen
- League: EliteHockey Ligaen
- Sport: Ice hockey
- Duration: 13 September 2024 – 10 April 2025
- Games: Regular season: 225; Postseason: 31
- Teams: 10

Regular season
- Season champions: Storhamar Hockey
- Runners-up: Frisk Asker Ishockey
- Relegated to First Division: IK Comet Halden

Playoffs
- Finals champions: Storhamar Hockey
- Runners-up: Stavanger Oilers

EliteHockey Ligaen seasons
- ← 2023–24 2025–26 →

The 2024–25 EliteHockey Ligaen season was the 86th season of professional ice hockey in Norway. The regular season ran from 13 September 2024 to 1 March 2025 with Storhamar Hockey finishing atop the standings. The postseason ran from 4 March to 10 April 2025. Storhamar Hockey defeated Stavanger Oilers 4 games to 0 for the league championship.

== Membership changes ==
- The Ringerike Panthers were relegated to the First Division and were replaced by Narvik IK.

== Teams ==
2024–25 EliteHockey Ligaen teams.
Eliteserien teams (Greater Oslo Region)

Team	City	Arena	Coach
Frisk Asker Ishockey	Asker	Varner Arena	(Norway) Roy Johansen
IK Comet Halden	Halden	Halden Ishall	(Norway) Lasse Fjeldstad
Lillehammer IK	Lillehammer	Eidsiva Arena	(Czech Republic) Jakub Petr
Lørenskog IK	Lørenskog	Lørenskog Ishall	(Norway) Kenneth Larsen
Narvik IK	Narvik	Nordkraft Arena	(Sweden) Fredrik Glader
Sparta Sarpsborg	Sarpsborg	Sparta Amfi	(Norway) Sjur Robert Nilsen
Stavanger Oilers	Stavanger	DNB Arena	(Norway) Anders Gjøse
Stjernen Hockey	Fredrikstad	Stjernehallen	(Norway) Niklas Andresen
Storhamar Ishockey	Hamar	CC Amfi	(Norway) Petter Thoresen
Vålerenga Ishockey	Oslo	Nye Jordal Amfi	(Sweden) Fredrik Andersson

== Standings ==
=== Regular season ===
Pos	Team	Pld	W	OTW	OTL	L	GF	GA	GD	Pts	Qualification
1	Storhamar Hockey (Note: Storhamar Hockey were deprived of 3 points due to financial problems.)	45	34	6	3	2	192	66	+126	114	Advanced to Quarterfinals
2	Frisk Asker Ishockey	45	29	6	2	8	187	96	+91	101	Advanced to Quarterfinals
3	Stavanger Oilers	45	32	0	3	10	178	97	+81	99	Advanced to Quarterfinals
4	Vålerenga Ishockey	45	27	2	5	11	172	99	+73	90	Advanced to Quarterfinals
5	Sparta Sarpsborg	45	20	4	6	15	144	108	+36	74	Advanced to Quarterfinals
6	Lillehammer IK	45	17	4	2	22	122	154	−32	61	Advanced to Quarterfinals
7	Narvik IK	45	12	8	3	22	127	159	−32	55	Advanced to Quarterfinals
8	Lørenskog IK	45	13	1	2	29	101	171	−70	43	Advanced to Quarterfinals
9	Stjernen Hockey	45	6	1	4	34	77	175	−98	24	Advanced to Relegation
10	IK Comet Halden	45	3	0	2	40	77	252	−175	11	Advanced to Relegation

Source: Alps Hockey League
Rules for classification: 1) Points; 2) Head-to-head points.

=== Statistics ===
==== Scoring leaders ====
Player	Team	Pos	GP	G	A	Pts	PIM
(United States) Cole Schneider	Storhamar Hockey	C/W	45	33	31	64	8
(Norway) Michael Haga	Frisk Asker Ishockey	C/LW	45	24	37	61	57
(Sweden) Villiam Haag	Vålerenga Ishockey	RW	44	29	25	54	12
(Norway) Tobias Lindström	Frisk Asker Ishockey	C/LW	44	17	37	54	24
(Finland) Teemu Lepaus	Vålerenga Ishockey	LW	45	8	44	52	20
(Canada) Tim McGauley	Vålerenga Ishockey	C	45	26	25	51	20
(United States) Dan Kissel	Stavanger Oilers	LW	45	19	28	47	26
(Norway) Andreas Martinsen	Storhamar Hockey	LW/RW	44	15	31	46	52
(Czech Republic) Nicolas Werbik	Stavanger Oilers	C	44	21	24	45	39
(Sweden) Hampus Gustafsson	Frisk Asker Ishockey	C/LW	41	16	27	43	16

==== Leading goaltenders ====
The following goaltenders led the league in goals against average, provided that they have played at least 1/3 of their team's minutes.

Player	Team	GP	TOI	W	L	GA	SO	SV%	GAA
(Norway) Trym Gran	Storhamar Hockey	18	1031	12	3	23	1	.938	1.34
(Norway) Markus Røhnebæk Stensrud	Storhamar Hockey	22	1510	21	1	40	1	.925	1.59
(Norway) Jens Auke Hoekstra	Stavanger Oilers	24	1442	19	3	41	1	.928	1.71
(Norway) Mathias Schjerpen Arnkværn	Vålerenga Ishockey	17	990	13	2	33	0	.921	2.01
(Canada) Mitch Gillam	Frisk Asker Ishockey	43	2551	32	10	89	2	.916	2.10

== Playoffs ==
=== Bracket ===
Quarterfinals (best-of-7)
1	Storhamar Hockey	5	5	11	6	-	-	-
8	Lørenskog IK	1	2	2	2	-	-	-
2	Frisk Asker Ishockey	11	6	3	4	-	-	-
6	Lillehammer IK	2	1	1	0	-	-	-
(Pairings are re-seeded after the first round)
3	Stavanger Oilers	3	5	2	5	3	-	-
7	Narvik IK	1	4	6	1	0	-	-
4	Vålerenga Ishockey	3	3	1	3	4	5	-
5	Sparta Sarpsborg	2	2	4	4**	2	1	-

Semifinals (best-of-7)
1	Storhamar Hockey	2	3	11	3	-	-	-
4	Vålerenga Ishockey	0	1	0	1	-	-	-
2	Frisk Asker Ishockey	0	1	2	1	-	-	-
3	Stavanger Oilers	6	2	3	2	-	-	-

Championship (best-of-7)
1	Storhamar Hockey	3*	2*	6	7	-	-	-
3	Stavanger Oilers	2	1	3	5	-	-	-

Note: * denotes overtime period(s)

== Relegation ==
Relegation (best-of-7)
9	Stjernen Hockey	1	3	3	3	3	7	7
10	IK Comet Halden	3	4*	4*	1	1	2	3
