= List of Stavanger Oilers seasons =

The Stavanger Oilers are a Norwegian ice hockey club based in Stavanger. They are members of the highest Norwegian ice hockey league, Eliteserien (known as GET-ligaen for sponsorship reasons). The Oilers were founded in 2000 by Hartti Kristola and other Finnish expatriate workers who wanted to play ice hockey at a professional level. After the demise of Viking IK in 1996 and the financial woes of successors Viking Hockey, the Oilers soon became the leading team in Stavanger. As of 2017, they have completed fourteen seasons in the Eliteserien, winning 359 regular season games and achieving nine top-three finishes.

Stavanger started out in the 2. divisjon (third tier) in 2001–02, earning successive promotions to the 1. divisjon and then Eliteserien over the next two years. They qualified for the playoffs in their first season in Eliteserien, losing out in the semi-finals to would-be champions Storhamar. Since then, the Oilers have made the playoffs every season. In 2006, they advanced all the way to the Finals, but lost in four straight games to Vålerenga. In 2010, they met Vålerenga in the Finals again, this time winning 4–2 to claim their first Norwegian Championship title.

== Seasons ==
Norwegian Champions	Regular Season Champions	Promoted	Relegated

Season	League	Regular season^{[a]}										Postseason^{[a]}						
Season	League	GP	W	L	T	OTW	OTL	GF	GA	Pts	Finish	GP	W	L	GF	GA	Pts	Result
2001–02	2. divisjon	24	18	0	6	—	—	304	33	42	1st							
2002–03^{[b]}	1. divisjon	36	30	3	3	—	—	288	96	63	1st	6	5	1	37	21	16	1st in Qualifying for Eliteserien
2003–04	Eliteserien	42	19	18	—	1	4	163	152	63	6th	7	4	3	20	26	—	Won in Quarter-finals, 3–1 (Trondheim); Lost in Semi-finals, 0–3 (Storhamar)
2004–05	Eliteserien	42	16	20	—	1	5	132	148	55	7th	3	0	3	7	17	—	Lost in Quarter-finals, 0–3 (Vålerenga)
2005–06	Eliteserien	42	19	14	—	5	4	131	128	71	4th	17	8	9	47	48	—	Won in Quarter-finals, 4–2 (Sparta); Won in Semi-finals, 4–3 (Stjernen); Lost in Finals, 0–4 (Vålerenga)
2006–07	Eliteserien	44	25	12	—	2	5	192	149	84	3rd	12	6	6	42	47	—	Won in Quarter-finals, 4–2 (Comet); Lost in Semi-finals, 2–4 (Storhamar)
2007–08	Eliteserien	44	20	16	—	4	4	135	117	72	6th	4	0	4	3	8	—	Lost in Quarter-finals, 0–4 (Storhamar)
2008–09	Eliteserien	45	26	15	—	2	2	148	117	84	4th	6	2	4	17	27	—	Lost in Quarter-finals, 2–4 (Storhamar)
2009–10	Eliteserien	48	24	17	—	1	6	132	128	82^{[c]}	3rd	18	12	6	54	40	—	Won in Quarter-finals, 4–2 (Lillehammer); Won in Semi-finals, 4–2 (Sparta); Won Norwegian Championship, 4–2 (Vålerenga)
2010–11	Eliteserien	45	27	10	—	5	3	176	108	94	2nd	16	9	7	52	40	—	Won in Quarter-finals, 4–1 (Frisk Asker); Won in Semi-finals, 4–2 (Lørenskog); Lost in Finals, 1–4 (Sparta)
2011–12	Eliteserien	45	35	6	—	3	1	216	100	112	1st	14	12	2	73	36	—	Won in Quarter-finals, 4–0 (Rosenborg); Won in Semi-finals, 4–0 (Lillehammer); Won Norwegian Championship, 4–2 (Lørenskog)
2012–13	Eliteserien	45	29	12	—	1	3	198	112	92	2nd	17	12	5	58	48	—	Won in Quarter-finals, 4–1 (Frisk Asker); Won in Semi-finals, 4–2 (Lørenskog); Won Norwegian Championship, 4–2 (Vålerenga)
2013–14	Eliteserien	45	30	8	—	4	3	198	98	101	2nd	17	12	5	54	34	—	Won in Quarter-finals, 4–0 (Rosenborg); Won in Semi-finals, 4–3 (Lillehammer); Won Norwegian Championship, 4–2 (Vålerenga)
2014–15	Eliteserien	45	32	9	—	3	1	187	93	100^{[d]}	1st	15	12	3	55	37	—	Won in Quarter-finals, 4–0 (Stjernen); Won in Semi-finals, 4–0 (Vålerenga); Won Norwegian Championship, 4–3 (Storhamar)
2015–16	Eliteserien	45	29	6	—	2	8	181	82	99	1st	17	12	5	44	30	—	Won in Quarter-finals, 4–0 (Manglerud Star); Won in Semi-finals, 4–3 (Storhamar); Won Norwegian Championship, 4–2 (Lørenskog)
2016–17	Eliteserien	45	28	10	—	6	1	174	102	97	1st	14	12	2	55	27	—	Won in Quarter-finals, 4–0 (Stjernen); Won in Semi-finals, 4–0 (Sparta); Won Norwegian Championship, 4–2 (Frisk Asker)
2017–18	Eliteserien	45	16	16	—	4	9	129	121	65	6th	5	1	4	7	17	—	Lost in Quarter-finals, 1–4 (Frisk Asker)
2018–19	Eliteserien	48	28	8	—	5	7	172	109	101	3rd	12	6	6	33	38	—	Won in Quarter-finals, 4–2 (Sparta); Lost in Semi-finals, 2–4 (Storhamar)
2019–20	Eliteserien	45	34	4	—	4	3	194	90	113	1st	The play-offs were cancelled						
2020–21	Eliteserien	24	15	7	—	1	1	97	52	48	3rd	The play-offs were cancelled						
2021–22	Eliteserien	45	30	6	—	6	3	162	89	105	1st	15	12	3	52	21	—	Won in Quarter-finals, 4–0 (Ringerike); Won in Semi-finals, 4–3 (Sparta); Won Norwegian Championship, 4–0 (Storhamar)
2022–23	Eliteserien	45	31	10	—	2	2	192	83	99	1st	15	12	3	65	23	—	Won in Quarter-finals, 4–0 (Lillehammer); Won in Semi-finals, 4–0 (Sparta); Won Norwegian Championship, 4–3 (Storhamar)
Eliteserien totals^{[e]}		874	513	224	—	62	75	3,309	2,178	1,737		224	144	80	738	564	—	18 playoff appearances

Statistics correct as of 19 April 2023.

== Notes ==
- ^{a} Code explanation; GP—Games Played, W—Wins, L—Losses, T—Tied games, OTW—Overtime/Shootout wins, OTL—Overtime/Shootout losses, GF—Goals For, GA—Goals Against, Pts—Points
- ^{b} Beginning with the 2002–03 season, all games in the Eliteserien have a winner. In addition, teams now receive three points for a win in regulation time, two points for a win in overtime and one point for a loss in overtime. This also applied to the qualifying rounds for the Eliteserien in 2003, but not the 2002–03 season of the 1. divisjon.
- ^{c} The Storhamar Dragons were deducted five points for use of an ineligible player during three games in November 2009, one of which was played against Stavanger. Stavanger, having originally lost the game in overtime, gained two extra points after the ruling.
- ^{d} Stavanger were deducted 3 points for using eligible player. Match between Stavanger and Vålerenga February 28, 2015, set to 0-0.
- ^{e} Totals as of the completion of the 2022–23 season.
