= 2023–24 EliteHockey Ligaen season =

- League: (Norway) EliteHockey Ligaen
- Sport: Ice hockey
- Duration: 15 September 2023 – 27 April 2024
- Games: 225 (Regular Season)
- Teams: 10
- TV partner: TV 2 Sport

Regular season
- League champions: Storhamar (9th title)
- Runners-up: Stavanger Oilers
- Top scorer: Peter Quenneville (33 Goals)

Playoffs
- Norwegian champions: Storhamar (8th title)
- Norwegian runners-up: Vålerenga

Eliteserien seasons
- 2022–23 2024-25

The 2023–24 EliteHockey Ligaen is the 85th season of Norway's premier ice hockey league, Eliteserien.

== Participating teams ==
Team	City	Arena	Capacity
Comet Halden	Halden	Halden Ishall	1,200
Frisk Asker	Asker	Varner Arena	3,805
Lillehammer IK	Lillehammer	Eidsiva Arena	3,197
Lørenskog	Lørenskog	Lørenskog Ishall	1,350
Ringerike Panthers	Hønefoss	Schjongshallen	1,500
Sparta Sarpsborg	Sarpsborg	Sparta Amfi	3,450
Stavanger Oilers	Stavanger	DNB Arena	4,377
Stjernen	Fredrikstad	Stjernehallen	2,473
Storhamar	Hamar	CC Amfi	7,000
Vålerenga	Oslo	Nye Jordal Amfi	5,300

== Regular season ==
=== Standings ===
Pos	Team	Pld	W	OTW	OTL	L	GF	GA	GD	Pts	Qualification
1	Storhamar	45	33	9	0	3	209	76	+133	117	Qualification to EliteHockey Ligaen Play-offs
2	Stavanger Oilers	45	31	1	5	8	165	92	+73	100	Qualification to EliteHockey Ligaen Play-offs
3	Vålerenga	45	31	2	2	10	190	121	+69	99	Qualification to EliteHockey Ligaen Play-offs
4	Sparta Sarpsborg	45	24	7	2	12	172	108	+64	88	Qualification to EliteHockey Ligaen Play-offs
5	Frisk Asker	45	23	2	5	15	167	129	+38	78	Qualification to EliteHockey Ligaen Play-offs
6	Stjernen	45	19	5	2	19	155	147	+8	69	Qualification to EliteHockey Ligaen Play-offs
7	Lillehammer	45	14	2	5	24	128	152	−24	51	Qualification to EliteHockey Ligaen Play-offs
8	Lørenskog IK	45	8	3	5	29	110	200	−90	35	Qualification to EliteHockey Ligaen Play-offs
9	Ringerike Panthers (R)	45	5	1	8	31	90	190	−100	25	Relegation round
10	Comet Halden	45	3	2	0	40	80	251	−171	13	Relegation round

Source: https://www.hockey.no/live/Standings?date=27.03.2024
Rules for classification: 1) Points; 2) Head-to-head points.
(R) Relegated

=== Regular season stats ===
The following players led the league at the end of the regular season ended on April 9, 2024.

Player	Team	GP	G	A	Pts	+/–	PIM
Peter Quenneville	Storhamar	43	33	39	72	+36	8
Patrick Thoresen	Storhamar	45	22	42	64	+47	18
Kristian Jacobsson	Sparta Sarpsborg	45	18	44	62	+23	14
Mika Partanen	Vålerenga	45	25	34	58	+25	18
Austin Cangelosi	Stjernen	40	27	31	52	+9	12
J.J. Piccinich	Stjernen	42	20	35	55	+13	12
Mathias Trettenes	Stavanger Oilers	41	17	37	54	+23	14
Dan Kissel	Stavanger Oilers	45	25	28	53	+25	25
Tobias Lindström	Frisk Asker	45	23	29	52	+19	26
Mathis Olimb	Vålerenga	45	13	34	47	+33	34

=== Leading goaltenders ===
The following goaltenders led the league in regular season goals against average at the end of the regular season ended on April 9, 2024, while playing at least 1,860 minutes.

Player	Team	GP	W	L	GA	SO	SV%	GAA
Jens Auke Hoekstra	Stavanger Oilers	39	6	3	11	5	.941	1.18
Markus Røhnebæck Stensrud	Storhamar	37	19	1	34	4	.920	1.62
Bence Bálizs	Sparta Sarpsborg	43	24	14	88	6	.919	2.27
Trym Gran	Storhamar	24	12	1	28	4	.918	1.93
Henrik Holm	Stavanger Oilers	45	26	7	73	3	.912	2.04
Tobias Johansen Breivold	Vålerenga	43	25	11	99	0	.909	2,67
Laban Byrkjeland	Stjernen	42	9	6	55	1	.909	3,00
Theo Rooseboom de Vries	Lillehammer	40	9	9	50	2	.908	2,60
Henrik Fayen-Vestavik	Frisk Asker	43	17	14	85	1	.902	2.96
Preben Arntsen	Stjernen	45	12	15	86	2	.898	3,27

== Playoffs ==
After the regular season, the top eight teams qualify for the playoffs. In the first and second rounds, the highest remaining seed will choose which of the two lowest remaining seeds to be matched against. In each round the higher-seeded team will be awarded home ice advantage. Each best-of-seven series will follow a 1–1–1–1–1–1–1 format: the higher-seeded team will play at home for games 1 and 3 (plus 5 and 7 if necessary), and the lower-seeded team at home for games 2, 4 and 6 (if necessary).

=== Bracket ===
Quarter-finals (best-of-7)
1	Storhamar	4
8	Lørenskog	0
2	Stavanger Oilers	4
7	Lillehammer	0
(Pairings are reseeded after the first round)
3	Vålerenga	4
6	Stjernen	1
4	Sparta Sarpsborg	1
5	Frisk Asker	4

Semi-finals (best-of-7)
1	Storhamar	4
5	Frisk Asker	1
2	Stavanger Oilers	3
3	Vålerenga	4

Finals (best-of-7)
1	Storhamar	4
3	Vålerenga	1

=== Quarterfinals ===
Storhamar – Lørenskog 4–0
14.03.2024	Storhamar	Lørenskog	6-3
16.03.2024	Lørenskog	Storhamar	2-3
19.03.2024	Storhamar	Lørenskog	5-2
21.03.2024	Lørenskog	Storhamar	1-10
Storhamar won the series 4–0

Stavanger Oilers – Lillehammer 4–0
14.03.2024	Stavanger Oilers	Lillehammer	5-1
16.03.2024	Lillehammer	Stavanger Oilers	1-3
19.03.2024	Stavanger Oilers	Lillehammer	4-1
21.03.2024	Lillehammer	Stavanger Oilers	2-3
Stavanger Oilers won the series 4–0

Vålerenga – Stjernen 4–1
14.03.2024	Vålerenga	Stjernen	7-1
16.03.2024	Stjernen	Vålerenga	4-5
19.03.2024	Vålerenga	Stjernen	7-1
21.03.2024	Stjernen	Vålerenga	5-1
23.03.2024	Vålerenga	Stjernen	5-1
Vålerenga won the series 4–1

Sparta Sarpsborg – Frisk Asker 1–4
14.03.2024	Sparta Sarpsborg	Frisk Asker	2-1
16.03.2024	Frisk Asker	Sparta Sarpsborg	4-3
19.03.2024	Sparta Sarpsborg	Frisk Asker	0-3
21.03.2024	Frisk Asker	Sparta Sarpsborg	4-1
23.03.2024	Sparta Sarpsborg	Frisk Asker	2-3 OT
Frisk Asker won the series 4–1

=== Semifinals ===
Storhamar – Frisk Asker 4–1
30.03.2024	Storhamar	Frisk Asker	5-3
01.04.2024	Frisk Asker	Storhamar	5-6 OT
03.04.2024	Storhamar	Frisk Asker	1-2 OT
05.04.2024	Frisk Asker	Storhamar	0-2
07.04.2024	Storhamar	Frisk Asker	3-1
Storhamar won the series 4–1

Stavanger Oilers – Vålerenga 3–4
31.03.2024	Stavanger Oilers	Vålerenga	4-1
02.04.2024	Vålerenga	Stavanger Oilers	2-1 OT
04.04.2024	Stavanger Oilers	Vålerenga	4-0
06.04.2024	Vålerenga	Stavanger Oilers	4-3 OT
08.04.2024	Stavanger Oilers	Vålerenga	2-3
10.04.2024	Vålerenga	Stavanger Oilers	3-5
12.04.2024	Stavanger Oilers	Vålerenga	4-5
Vålerenga won the series 4-3

=== Finals ===
Storhamar – Vålerenga 4-1
15.04.2024	Storhamar	Vålerenga	5-1
17.04.2024	Vålerenga	Storhamar	5-2
19.04.2024	Storhamar	Vålerenga	4-1
21.04.2024	Vålerenga	Storhamar	2-4
23.04.2024	Storhamar	Vålerenga	4-3 OT
Storhamar won the series 4–1

== Play-inns for the Relegation/Promotion round ==
The four top teams of the First Division plays a first of 5 game before entering the Relegation/Promotion round against the bottom two teams of the Regular season of the EliteHockey Ligaen.

Play-inns (best-of-5)
1	Narvik	3
4	Gjøvik	0
Play-inns (best-of-5)
2	Nidaros	2
3	Grüner	3

== Relegation round ==
The bottom two teams of the regular season faced the two top teams of the First Division in the relegation round. Only the top two teams of the relegation round would be qualified for the next season.

Pos	Team	Pld	W	OTW	OTL	L	GF	GA	GD	Pts	Qualification
1	Narvik	6	3	1	1	1	27	18	+9	12	
2	Comet	6	3	1	0	2	17	20	−3	11	
3	Grüner (R)	6	2	0	1	3	15	22	−7	7	Relegation to First Division
4	Ringerike Panthers (R)	6	2	0	0	4	22	21	+1	6	Relegation to First Division

Source: Hockey.no
Rules for classification: 1) Points; 2) Head-to-head points.
(R) Relegated
