= Andreas Martinsen =

Norwegian ice hockey player (born 1990)

- Born: 13 June 1990 (age 36) Bærum, Norway
- Height: 6 ft 3 in (191 cm)
- Weight: 220 lb (100 kg; 15 st 10 lb)
- Position: Left wing
- Shoots: Left
- EHL team Former teams: Storhamar; Vålerenga; Lillehammer IK; Leksands IF; Düsseldorfer EG; Colorado Avalanche; Montreal Canadiens; Chicago Blackhawks; EV Zug
- National team: Norway
- NHL draft: Undrafted
- Playing career: 2007–present

Andreas Martinsen (born 13 June 1990) is a Norwegian professional ice hockey player who is a left winger for Storhamar Hockey of the EliteHockey Ligaen. He formerly played in the National Hockey League (NHL) with the Colorado Avalanche, Montreal Canadiens and the Chicago Blackhawks. He also played for Lillehammer IK and Vålerenga Ishockey. He is of Indian Ugandan and Norwegian descent.

== Playing career ==
Martinsen first played as a youth in his native Norway with Rosenborg IHK before joining GET-ligaen first team club, Lillehammer IK in 2006. As a 17-year-old, Martinsen made his first team professional debut with Lillehammer in the 2007–08 season, featuring in 43 games with a promising 20 points. With good size and physical play, Martinsen was hopeful to be selected in the Canadian Hockey League import draft but was passed over. On 7 July 2008, he opted to remain with Lillehammer to continue his development on a year contract. After his second full season with Lillehammer, establishing himself amongst the scoring lines with 23 points in 43 games, Martinsen signed a contract with Swedish HockeyAllsvenskan outfit, Leksands IF on 9 April 2009.

During the 2009–10 season, Martinsen struggled to cement his position within Leksands. Used sparingly through 22 games, Martinsen agreed to leave Sweden to return to Lillehammer on loan for the remainder of the season on 15 December 2009. As a welcome addition to the Lillehammer club, Martinsen immediately contributed to finish the year with 10 points in 14 games. On 29 May 2010, Martinsen was signed to a multi-year contract to remain with Lillehammer.

Over the next two seasons, Martinsen established himself amongst the club's scoring leaders on a point per game average. In order to progress his career on 25 May 2012, he agreed to his second European venture in signing with German club, Düsseldorfer EG in the Deutsche Eishockey Liga. In his rookie DEL season in 2012–13, Martinsen secured a checking line role on DEG, contributing with 22 points in 52 games as a 22-year-old. After signing for a third season with Düsseldorfer EG, Martinsen recorded a break-out season in 2014–15, using his size and touch to finish third on the team in scoring with 18 goals and 41 points in 55 games. He made his post-season debut with DEG appearing in 12 games with 5 points upon suffering a semi-final loss.

With his breakout performance garnering NHL interest, Martinsen signed a one-year, two-way entry-level contract with the Colorado Avalanche on 15 May 2015. After attending the Avalanche September training camp, Martinsen was reassigned to begin the 2015–16 season with American Hockey League affiliate, the San Antonio Rampage. After 9 games with the Rampage, Martinsen was recalled to provide a physical presence to Colorado on 9 November 2015. Martinsen made his NHL debut the following day in a 4-0 victory over the Philadelphia Flyers. He became the third Norwegian player to appear with the Avalanche and just the 8th to reach the NHL. In his 6th game with the Avalanche, Martinsen recorded his first NHL goal in a 7-3 defeat to the Washington Capitals on 21 November 2015. Martinsen remained primarily with Colorado for the remainder of the season, appearing in 55 games for 11 points and finished the year leading all NHL rookies in hits-per-game.

On 24 June 2016, Martinsen agreed as a restricted free agent to a one-year, one-way contract extension with the Avalanche. In the 2016–17 season, Martinsen made the opening night roster, solidifying his role as a physical checking forward on the fourth line. He appeared in his 100th career NHL game in a 4-1 defeat to the Pittsburgh Penguins on 9 February 2017. With the Avalanche in the midst of their worst season in franchise history in Colorado, Martinsen matched his previous year's tally of 55 games before he was dealt at the NHL trade deadline to the Montreal Canadiens in exchange for Sven Andrighetto on 1 March 2017. He became the first Norwegian to be involved in an NHL trade at the deadline. Martinsen played out the season with the Canadiens, going scoreless in 9 regular season games and 2 playoff games.

On 6 June 2017, Martinsen was re-signed to a one-year, one-way deal with the Canadiens. After participating in Montreal's training camp and pre-season, Martinsen failed to make the club and was reassigned to its AHL affiliate, the Laval Rocket, on 3 October 2017. The following day, on the opening of the 2017–18 season, Martinsen was traded by the Canadiens to the Chicago Blackhawks in exchange for Kyle Baun. He would continue in the AHL with the Rockford IceHogs.

On 7 June 2018, Martinsen agreed to a one-year extension to remain with the Blackhawks. Making the Blackhawks' opening night roster for the 2018–19 season, Martinsen appeared in 24 games registering 1 goal and 4 points, before he was sent down to the AHL after his role diminished under new head coach Jeremy Colliton. He played the remainder of the campaign with Rockford, compiling 11 points in 38 games.

On 5 July 2019, Martinsen signed as a free agent to a one-year, two-way contract with the Anaheim Ducks. After attending the Ducks 2019 training camp, Martinsen was assigned to begin the 2019–20 season with the AHL affiliate San Diego Gulls. He was scoreless in a lone appearance with the Gulls before he was traded by the Ducks along with a 2021 seventh-round draft selection to the Pittsburgh Penguins in exchange for Erik Gudbranson on 26 October 2019. He was immediately assigned to the AHL affiliate Wilkes-Barre/Scranton Penguins. In joining Wilkes-Barre, Martinsen struggled to find his role, producing just three points through 24 games. On 24 January 2020, Martinsen was placed on unconditional waivers by the Penguins to complete a mutual termination of his contract. On 27 January 2020, Martinsen returned to Europe and agreed to join Swiss club EV Zug of the National League (NL) for the remainder of the season.

As a free agent, Martinsen opted to return to Norway, agreeing to a contract with Lillehammer IK on 23 September 2020.

In the third season of his stint with Lillehammer in 2022–23, Martinsen posted 8 points through 15 games before leaving the club for fellow Norwegian outfit Vålerenga, on 2 January 2023.

On 27 April 2023 Martinsen signed with Storhamar Hockey.

== International play ==
Medal record

Men's ice hockey

Representing Norway

World Championships
Bronze medal – third place	2026 Switzerland	

Martinsen was first selected to compete on the international stage as a junior for Norway at the 2007 World Under-18 Championships. Finishing with a Division 1 bronze medal, Martinsen was a fixture on the Norwegian junior team throughout his junior eligibility. Martinsen made his senior international debut for Norway as a 20-year-old at the 2010 IIHF World Championships. He has appeared in each World Championships since, marking 7 consecutive championships as of 2016.

== Career statistics ==
=== Regular season and playoffs ===
			Regular season					Playoffs
Season	Team	League	GP	G	A	Pts	PIM	GP	G	A	Pts	PIM
2007–08	Lillehammer IK	GET	43	9	11	20	114	7	2	0	2	8
2008–09	Lillehammer IK	GET	43	8	15	23	98	6	1	2	3	26
2009–10	Leksands IF	J20	8	2	3	5	37	—	—	—	—	—
2009–10	Leksands IF	Allsv	22	3	2	5	8	—	—	—	—	—
2009–10	Lillehammer IK	GET	14	2	8	10	28	5	0	0	0	0
2010–11	Lillehammer IK	GET	43	17	27	44	106	6	1	3	4	6
2011–12	Lillehammer IK	GET	45	17	26	43	121	11	3	2	5	26
2012–13	Düsseldorfer EG	DEL	52	6	16	22	72	—	—	—	—	—
2013–14	Düsseldorfer EG	DEL	42	9	8	17	124	—	—	—	—	—
2014–15	Düsseldorfer EG	DEL	50	18	23	41	99	12	1	4	5	8
2015–16	San Antonio Rampage	AHL	10	1	1	2	8	—	—	—	—	—
2015–16	Colorado Avalanche	NHL	55	4	7	11	47	—	—	—	—	—
2016–17	Colorado Avalanche	NHL	55	3	4	7	32	—	—	—	—	—
2016–17	Montreal Canadiens	NHL	9	0	0	0	0	2	0	0	0	0
2017–18	Rockford IceHogs	AHL	64	12	16	28	62	13	2	3	5	32
2017–18	Chicago Blackhawks	NHL	9	1	0	1	17	—	—	—	—	—
2018–19	Chicago Blackhawks	NHL	24	1	3	4	14	—	—	—	—	—
2018–19	Rockford IceHogs	AHL	38	3	8	11	32	—	—	—	—	—
2019–20	San Diego Gulls	AHL	1	0	0	0	0	—	—	—	—	—
2019–20	Wilkes-Barre/Scranton Penguins	AHL	24	1	2	3	10	—	—	—	—	—
2019–20	EVZ Academy	SL	1	0	0	0	0	—	—	—	—	—
2019–20	EV Zug	NL	5	1	0	1	4	—	—	—	—	—
2020–21	Lillehammer IK	FKL	24	6	16	22	98	—	—	—	—	—
2021–22	Lillehammer IK	FKL	12	3	8	11	26	7	5	1	6	35
2023–24	Lillehammer IK	FKL	15	2	6	8	18	—	—	—	—	—
2022–23	Vålerenga Ishockey	FKL	16	5	4	9	20	10	3	2	5	22
2023–24	Storhamar	EHL	45	18	23	41	54	14	2	5	7	16
2024–25	Storhamar	EHL	44	15	31	46	52	9	3	7	10	31
2025–26	Storhamar	EHL	45	15	29	44	46	15	6	7	13	53
NOR totals			389	117	204	321	781	94	26	30	56	227
DEL totals			144	33	47	80	295	12	1	4	5	8
NHL totals			152	9	14	23	110	2	0	0	0	0

=== International ===
Year	Team	Event	Result	GP	G	A	Pts	PIM
2007	Norway	WJC18-D1	13th	5	4	2	6	12
2008	Norway	WJC18-D1	11th	5	0	3	3	8
2008	Norway	WJC-D1	13th	5	0	3	3	4
2009	Norway	WJC-D1	13th	5	4	2	6	31
2010	Norway	WJC-D1	11th	5	5	4	9	4
2010	Norway	WC	9th	3	0	0	0	0
2011	Norway	WC	6th	7	0	0	0	6
2012	Norway	WC	8th	8	1	2	3	0
2013	Norway	WC	10th	7	0	0	0	25
2014	Norway	WC	12th	7	0	0	0	4
2015	Norway	WC	11th	7	0	1	1	10
2016	Norway	WC	10th	7	2	1	3	8
2016	Norway	OGQ	Q	3	1	1	2	12
2017	Norway	WC	11th	7	1	1	2	6
2019	Norway	WC	12th	7	0	6	6	16
2021	Norway	OGQ	NQ	3	0	1	1	4
2022	Norway	WC	13th	6	2	1	3	8
2023	Norway	WC	13th	7	1	1	2	6
2024	Norway	WC	11th	7	0	0	0	2
2024	Norway	OGQ	NQ	3	0	0	0	8
2025	Norway	WC	12th	7	1	1	2	6
2026	Norway	WC	3rd place, bronze medalist(s)	10	1	3	4	10
Junior totals				25	13	14	27	59
Senior totals				106	10	19	29	131

== See also ==
- List of Indian NHL players
