= 2009 Telus Cup =

Tournament details
- Venue: Selkirk Recreation Complex in Selkirk, MB
- Dates: April 20–26, 2009
- Teams: 6

Final positions
- Champions: Notre Dame Hounds
- Runners-up: Calgary Buffaloes
- Third place: Rousseau Sports de Laval-Bourassa

Tournament statistics
- Scoring leader: Nolan Zajac

Awards
- MVP: Nolan Zajac

The 2009 Telus Cup was Canada's 31st annual national midget 'AAA' hockey championship, played April 20–26, 2009 at the Selkirk Recreation Complex in Selkirk, Manitoba. The Notre Dame Hounds defeated the Calgary Buffaloes 4-0 in the gold medal game to win their third national title. The Rousseau Sports de Laval-Bourassa defeated the host Winnipeg Thrashers to win the bronze. Winnipeg's Nolan Zajac, younger brother of National Hockey League player Travis Zajac, was the top scorer and named Most Valuable Player.

== Teams ==
Result	Team	Region	City
1st place, gold medalist(s)	Notre Dame Hounds	West	Wilcox, SK
2nd place, silver medalist(s)	Calgary Buffaloes	Pacific	Calgary, AB
3rd place, bronze medalist(s)	Rousseau Sports de Laval-Bourassa	Québec	Laval, QC
4	Winnipeg Thrashers	Host	Winnipeg, MB
5	Moncton Flyers	Atlantic	Moncton, NB
6	Hamilton Reps	Central	Hamilton, ON

== Round robin ==
=== Standings ===
Pos	Team	Pld	W	L	D	GF	GA	GD	Pts
1	Notre Dame Hounds	5	4	0	1	34	17	+17	9
2	Winnipeg Thrashers	5	4	1	0	25	16	+9	8
3	Calgary Buffaloes	5	2	1	2	22	17	+5	6
4	Rousseau Sports de Laval-Bourassa	5	1	2	2	15	18	−3	4
5	Moncton Flyers	5	1	4	0	15	32	−17	2
6	Hamilton Reps	5	0	4	1	14	25	−11	1

=== Scores ===
- Laval-Bourassa 5 - Moncton 4
- Notre Dame 4 - Calgary 4
- Winnipeg 5 - Hamilton 4
- Notre Dame 5 - Laval-Bourassa 4
- Calgary 4 - Hamilton 2
- Winnipeg 7 - Moncton 1
- Hamilton 2 - Laval-Bourassa 2
- Notre Dame 11 - Moncton 3
- Winnipeg 6 - Calgary 5
- Moncton 5 - Hamilton 3
- Calgary 3 - Laval-Bourassa 3
- Notre Dame 5 - Winnipeg 3
- Calgary 6 - Moncton 2
- Notre Dame 9 - Hamilton 3
- Winnipeg 4 - Laval-Bourassa 1

== Playoffs ==
=== Semi-finals ===
- Notre Dame 6 - Laval-Bourassa 4
- Calgary 7 - Winnipeg 0

=== Bronze medal game ===
- Laval-Bourassa 5 - Winnipeg 2

=== Gold medal game ===
- Notre Dame 4 - Calgary 0

== Individual awards ==
- Most Valuable Player: Nolan Zajac (Winnipeg)
- Top Scorer: Nolan Zajac (Winnipeg)
- Top Forward: Ben Gamache (Notre Dame)
- Top Defenceman: Jesse Pauls (Notre Dame)
- Top Goaltender: Brett Gagnon (Winnipeg)
- Most Sportsmanlike Player: Chris Collins (Calgary)

== Road to the Telus Cup ==
=== Atlantic Region ===
Tournament held April 3–5, 2009 at Saint John, New Brunswick

Round Robin
Pos	Team	Pld	W	L	D	GF	GA	GD	Pts
1	Cornwall Thunder	4	3	1	0	14	9	+5	6
2	Moncton Flyers	4	2	1	1	14	13	+1	5
3	St. John's Fog Devils	4	2	2	0	15	12	+3	4
4	Saint John Vitos (host)	4	1	2	1	8	14	−6	3
5	Cole Harbour McCains	4	1	3	0	10	13	−3	2

Championship Game
Moncton 5 - Cornwall 4
Moncton advances to Telus Cup

=== Quebec ===
Ligue de Hockey Midget AAA du Quebec Championship

Rousseau Sports de Laval-Bourassa vs Trois-Rivières

Best-of-7 series played March 31-April 7, 2009
Laval-Bourassa wins series 4-0 and advances to Telus Cup

=== Central Region ===
Tournament held March 30-April 5, 2009 at Burlington, Ontario

Round Robin
Pos	Team	Pld	W	L	D	GF	GA	GD	Pts
1	Burlington Eagles (host)	6	5	1	0	33	18	+15	10
2	Sault Ste. Marie North Stars	6	4	2	0	24	20	+4	8
3	Hamilton Reps	6	3	2	1	21	19	+2	7
4	Oakville Rangers	6	3	3	0	23	25	−2	6
5	Toronto Titans	6	3	3	0	22	16	+6	6
6	Ottawa 67's	6	1	4	1	21	31	−10	3
7	Ottawa Valley Titans	6	1	5	0	10	26	−16	2

Semi-finals
Hamilton 8 - Sault Ste. Marie 4
Oakville 5 - Burlington 0

Championship Game
Hamilton 8 - Oakville 6
Hamilton advances to Telus Cup

=== West Region ===
Tournament held April 2–5, 2009 at Swift Current, Saskatchewan

Round Robin
Pos	Team	Pld	W	L	D	GF	GA	GD	Pts
1	Winnipeg Wild	3	2	0	1	15	9	+6	5
2	Notre Dame Hounds	3	2	1	0	14	9	+5	4
3	Swift Current Legionnaires (host)	3	1	1	1	11	9	+2	3
4	Thunder Bay Kings	3	0	3	0	6	19	−13	0

Championship Game
Notre Dame 8 - Winnipeg 2
Notre Dame advances to Telus Cup

=== Pacific Region ===
Calgary Buffaloes vs Vancouver North West Giants

Best-of-3 series played April 3–5, 2009

- Game 1: Calgary 3 - Vancouver 1
- Game 2: Vancouver 6 - Calgary 3
- Game 3: Calgary 3 - Vancouver 2

Calgary wins series and advances to Telus Cup

== See also ==
- Telus Cup
