= Nolan Zajac =

Canadian ice hockey player (born 1992)

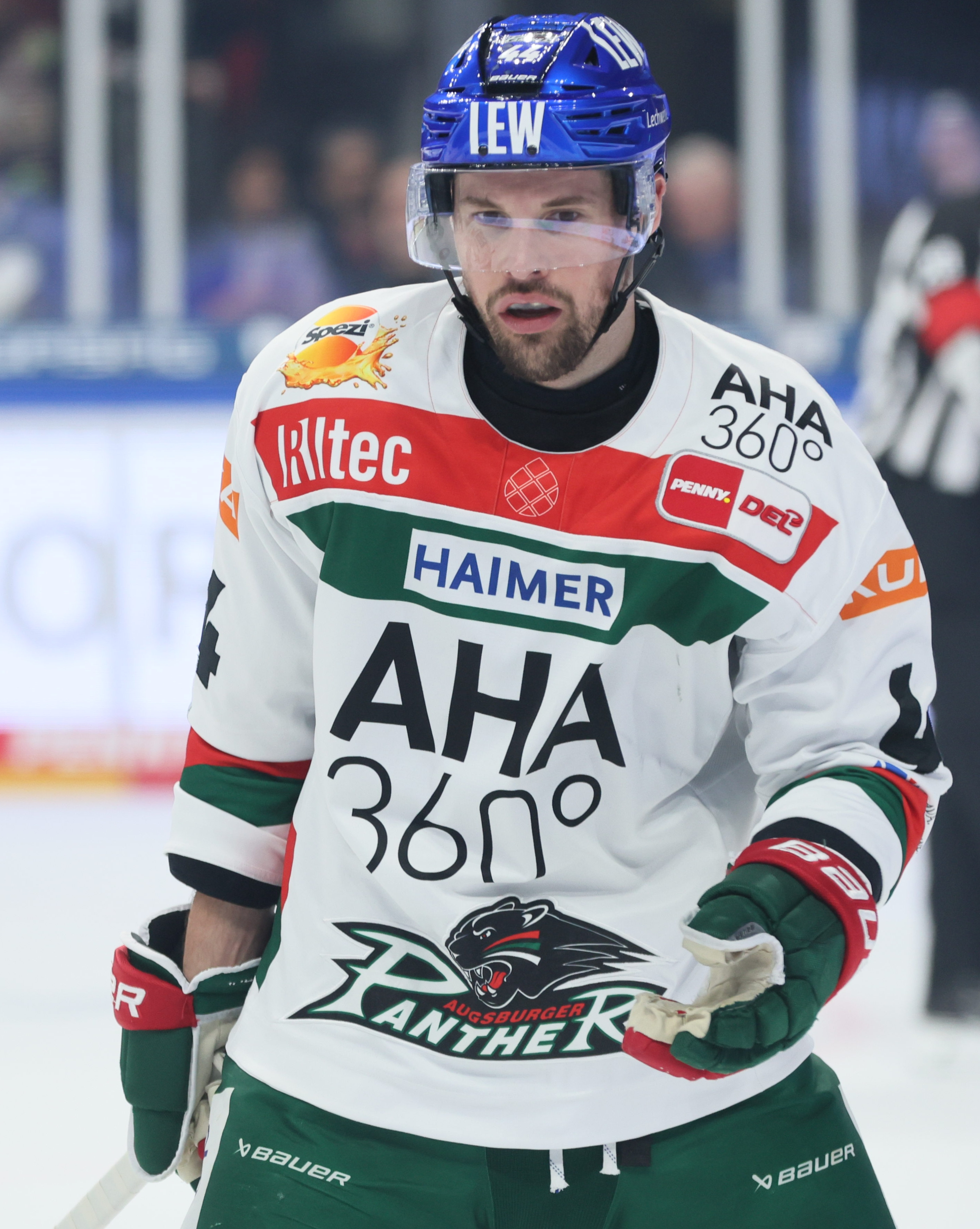
- Nolan Zajac, 2025
- Born: August 1, 1992 (age 34) Winnipeg, Manitoba, Canada
- Height: 5 ft 10 in (178 cm)
- Weight: 185 lb (84 kg; 13 st 3 lb)
- Position: Defensemen
- Shoots: Left
- team Former teams: Free Agent; Hershey Bears; Manitoba Moose; Iowa Wild; IK Oskarshamn; Timrå IK; Grizzlys Wolfsburg; Augsburger Panther
- NHL draft: Undrafted
- Playing career: 2016–present

Nolan Zajac (born August 1, 1992) is a Canadian professional ice hockey defenceman who is currently an unrestricted free agent. He most recently played for Grizzlys Wolfsburg in the Deutsche Eishockey Liga (DEL). Prior to turning professional, he played four seasons with the Denver Pioneers men's ice hockey team. His older brothers Travis, Kelly, and Darcy are also professional ice hockey players.

== Early life ==
Zajac was born on August 1, 1992, in Winnipeg, Manitoba, as the youngest son to parents Tom and Trish Zajac. His older brothers Travis, Kelly, and Darcy are all professional ice hockey players. His father Tom also played collegiate hockey for the University of Denver. Growing up, Zajac wanted to play goaltender but was encouraged to become a defenceman by his older brothers. When reflecting on his childhood, he credited his family for his success.

== Playing career ==
Growing up in Manitoba, Zajac played minor ice hockey with the Winnipeg Thrashers of the Manitoba AAA Midget Hockey League. While with the team, he competed in the 2009 Telus Cup where he was the top scorer. He also competed with Team Canada West at the 2009 World U-17 Hockey Challenge. As a result of his play, Zajac was drafted 12th overall by the Cedar Rapids RoughRiders in the 2009 United States Hockey League (USHL) Draft. He played 101 games with the RoughRiders, recording 42 points, before being traded to the Omaha Lancers in exchange for Nathan Widman. Upon joining the Lancers, Zajac was selected for the 2011 USHL Mid-Season All-Star Team. Zajac completed his tenure in the USHL with 80 points in 154 games.

While attending George Washington High School, Zajac announced his commitment to play with the Denver Pioneers men's ice hockey team.

=== Professional ===
Zajac completed his first professional season fifth among all ECHL defenders in scoring with 54 points. He also appeared in 11 American Hockey League (AHL) contests with the Iowa Wild, Hershey Bears, and Manitoba Moose. On August 4, 2017, he signed his first AHL contract with the Lehigh Valley Phantoms of the Philadelphia Flyers organization. While playing with the Reading Royals, Zajac was selected for the 2017–18 All-ECHL Second Team after ending the season tied for second among league blue liners.

Following his season with the Royals, Zajac signed with IK Oskarshamn, who were then playing in the HockeyAllsvenskan. He recorded 31 points in 52 games before signing with the Stavanger Oilers of the Norwegian Eliteserien league. Zajac returned to IK Oskarshamn for the 2020–21 season.
