= Yrjölä =

Yrjölä is a Finnish surname.

== Geographical distribution ==
As of 2014, 96.8% of all known bearers of the surname Yrjölä were residents of Finland (frequency 1:5,394), 1.7% of Sweden (1:547,042) and 1.1% of Estonia (1:110,139).

In Finland, the frequency of the surname was higher than national average (1:5,394) in the following regions:

1. Kymenlaakso (1:904)
2. Päijänne Tavastia (1:2,241)
3. Pirkanmaa (1:2,258)
4. Tavastia Proper (1:4,286)
5. Uusimaa (1:4,777)

== People ==
- Eero Yrjölä (1925–2010), Finnish diplomat
- Iivari Yrjölä (1899–1985), Finnish athlete
- Lassi Yrjölä (born 1994), Finnish ice hockey player
- Matti Yrjölä (born 1938), Finnish shot putter
- Paavo Yrjölä (1902–1980), Finnish track and field athlete
- Siiri Yrjölä (born 2004), Finnish ice hockey player
- Tuula Yrjölä, Finnish diplomat
