= Mike Hoeffel =

American-German ice hockey player

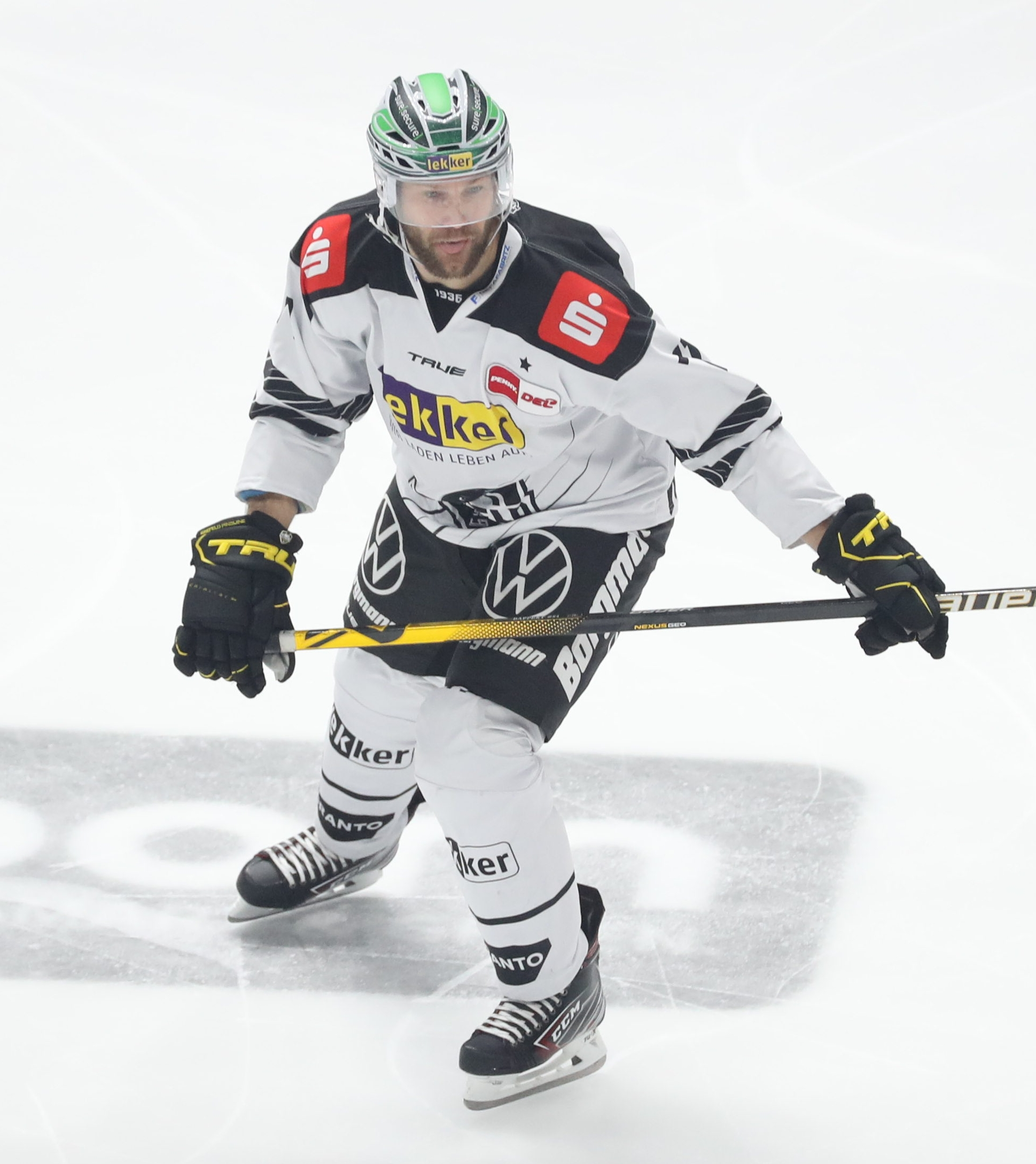
- Hoeffel with the Krefeld Pinguine in 2022
- Born: April 9, 1989 (age 37) North Oaks, Minnesota, U.S.
- Height: 6 ft 2 in (188 cm)
- Weight: 210 lb (95 kg; 15 st 0 lb)
- Position: Wing
- Shoots: Left
- Played for: Albany Devils; Springfield Falcons; Stavanger Oilers; Fischtown Pinguins; Iserlohn Roosters; Krefeld Pinguine
- NHL draft: 57th overall, 2007; New Jersey Devils
- Playing career: 2011–present

Michael "Mike" Hoeffel (born April 9, 1989) is an American-German professional ice hockey winger, who is currently an unrestricted free agent. He most recently played for Krefeld Pinguine, then of the Deutsche Eishockey Liga (DEL).

== Playing career ==
Hoeffel played collegiately for the Minnesota Golden Gophers men's ice hockey, which competes in the WCHA after playing high school hockey for the Hill-Murray Pioneers of Minnesota. He was selected by the New Jersey Devils in the 2nd round (57th overall) of the 2007 NHL entry draft, and made his professional debut with New Jersey's AHL affiliate, the Albany Devils.

On July 25, 2014, Hoeffel was signed as a free agent to a one-year AHL contract with the Springfield Falcons. In the 2014–15 season, Hoeffel contributed to the Falcons in a checking line role and recorded a professional high 9 goals in 62 games.

In the following 2015–16 season, Hoeffel was un-signed before belatedly returning to the Falcons, who had changed NHL affiliations, on a professional try-out contract on November 27, 2015. Having featured in only four scoreless games with the Falcons, Hoeffel sought a release from his try-out with Springfield and signed his first contract abroad in agreeing to a contract for the remainder of the year with Norwegian club Stavanger Oilers of the GET-ligaen, on December 14, 2015.

In possessing a German passport through his heritage, Hoeffel first played in Germany with Eispiraten Crimmitschau of the DEL2, before joining and playing the next three seasons in the DEL with the Fischtown Pinguins.

After the 2018–19 season, Hoeffel left Fischtown to sign a one-year contract with fellow DEL outfit, the Iserlohn Roosters, on March 29, 2019.

== Career statistics ==
			Regular season					Playoffs
Season	Team	League	GP	G	A	Pts	PIM	GP	G	A	Pts	PIM
2007–08	University of Minnesota	NCAA	45	9	10	19	22	—	—	—	—	—
2008–09	University of Minnesota	NCAA	35	12	8	20	38	—	—	—	—	—
2009–10	University of Minnesota	NCAA	34	14	10	24	22	—	—	—	—	—
2010–11	University of Minnesota	NCAA	35	13	11	24	24	—	—	—	—	—
2010–11	Albany Devils	AHL	10	2	0	2	6	—	—	—	—	—
2011–12	Albany Devils	AHL	50	5	4	9	28	—	—	—	—	—
2012–13	Albany Devils	AHL	52	5	5	10	37	—	—	—	—	—
2013–14	Albany Devils	AHL	53	7	12	19	40	—	—	—	—	—
2014–15	Springfield Falcons	AHL	62	9	9	18	39	—	—	—	—	—
2015–16	Springfield Falcons	AHL	4	0	0	0	2	—	—	—	—	—
2015–16	Stavanger Oilers	Norway	19	5	2	7	10	13	0	1	1	22
2016–17	Eispiraten Crimmitschau	DEL2	27	11	8	19	45	—	—	—	—	—
2016–17	Fischtown Pinguins	DEL	21	3	3	6	24	6	2	3	5	4
2017–18	Fischtown Pinguins	DEL	49	12	8	20	26	7	1	3	4	0
2018–19	Fischtown Pinguins	DEL	48	9	10	19	32	3	0	0	0	4
2019–20	Iserlohn Roosters	DEL	33	5	4	9	16	—	—	—	—	—
2020–21	Iserlohn Roosters	DEL	—	—	—	—	—	—	—	—	—	—
2021–22	Krefeld Pinguine	DEL	12	1	0	1	4	—	—	—	—	—
AHL totals			231	28	30	58	152	—	—	—	—	—
DEL totals			163	30	25	55	102	16	3	6	9	8

== Awards and honors ==
Award	Year
College
WCHA All-Tournament Team	2008
WCHA All-Academic team	2009, 2010
International
IH18 (Silver Medal with Team USA)	2006
