= Mathias Trettenes =

Norwegian ice hockey player

- Born: 8 November 1993 (age 32) Stavanger, Norway
- Height: 5 ft 10 in (178 cm)
- Weight: 168 lb (76 kg; 12 st 0 lb)
- Position: Centre
- Shoots: Left
- SL team Former teams: HC La Chaux-de-Fonds; Almtuna IS; Krefeld Pinguine; Stavanger Oilers
- National team: Norway
- Playing career: 2011–present

Mathias Trettenes (born 8 November 1993) is a Norwegian professional ice hockey forward who currently plays for HC La Chaux-de-Fonds in the Swiss League (SL).

== Playing career ==
Trettenes played as a youth in Sweden as a part of the junior program Modo Hockey. He began his professional career in his native Norway, playing with the Stavanger Oilers of the GET-ligaen. After five seasons with the Oilers, he returned to Sweden to play the 2016–17 season, with Almtuna IS of the HockeyAllsvenskan.

After a single season with Almtuna, Trettenes opted to move to Germany in agreeing to a one-year deal with Krefeld Pinguine of the DEL on 7 June 2017. In the 2018–19 season, his second with the Krefeld, Trettenes contributed with 10 points in 44 games before leaving as a free agent at the conclusion of the year.

On 4 May 2020 Trettenes joined HC La Chaux-de-Fonds of the second-tier Swiss League (SL) on a one-year deal.

== Career statistics ==
=== Regular season and playoffs ===
			Regular season					Playoffs
Season	Team	League	GP	G	A	Pts	PIM	GP	G	A	Pts	PIM
2007–08	Viking Hockey	NOR U17	6	0	1	1	0	—	—	—	—	—
2008–09	Viking Hockey	NOR U17	13	30	42	72	20	—	—	—	—	—
2009–10	Modo Hockey	J18	18	6	9	15	14	—	—	—	—	—
2009–10	Modo Hockey	J18 Allsv	14	0	3	3	14	4	1	2	3	0
2009–10	Modo Hockey	J20	5	0	0	0	2	—	—	—	—	—
2010–11	Modo Hockey	J18	22	18	26	44	52	—	—	—	—	—
2010–11	Modo Hockey	J18 Allsv	18	6	12	18	12	3	2	0	2	4
2010–11	Modo Hockey	J20	5	0	1	1	0	—	—	—	—	—
2011–12	Stavanger Oilers	NOR	30	4	13	17	14	14	0	2	2	8
2011–12	Stavanger Oilers II	NOR.2	11	6	15	21	14	—	—	—	—	—
2012–13	Stavanger Oilers	NOR	27	4	11	15	6	17	2	3	5	4
2013–14	Stavanger Oilers	NOR	44	13	19	32	32	17	3	5	8	6
2014–15	Stavanger Oilers	NOR	44	19	27	46	12	15	2	6	8	16
2015–16	Stavanger Oilers	NOR	42	16	20	36	6	17	3	5	8	6
2016–17	Almtuna IS	Allsv	45	7	6	13	14	5	0	2	2	0
2017–18	Krefeld Pinguine	DEL	47	5	12	17	16	—	—	—	—	—
2017–18	Stavanger Oilers	NOR	3	0	1	1	2	5	0	2	2	10
2018–19	Krefeld Pinguine	DEL	44	4	6	10	12	—	—	—	—	—
2019–20	Stavanger Oilers	NOR	44	15	41	56	39	—	—	—	—	—
2020–21	HC La Chaux–de–Fonds	SUI.2	33	13	26	39	18	8	0	4	4	0
2020–21	EHC Biel	NL	4	0	3	3	0	2	0	0	0	14
2021–22	HC La Chaux–de–Fonds	SUI.2	49	18	39	57	16	12	2	5	7	8
2021–22	EHC Biel	NL	4	0	1	1	0	—	—	—	—	—
NOR totals			234	71	132	203	111	85	10	23	33	50

=== International ===
Year	Team	Event	GP	G	A	Pts	PIM
2011	Norway	WJC18	6	0	2	2	16
2012	Norway	WJC D1A	5	1	3	4	14
2013	Norway	WJC D1A	5	1	4	5	4
2015	Norway	WC	5	0	0	0	2
2016	Norway	WC	7	0	0	0	2
2016	Norway	OGQ	3	0	0	0	0
2017	Norway	WC	7	0	0	0	8
2018	Norway	OG	4	0	0	0	0
2018	Norway	WC	5	1	1	2	0
2019	Norway	WC	7	2	1	3	0
2021	Norway	WC	7	3	4	7	0
2021	Norway	OGQ	3	0	1	1	0
2022	Norway	WC	7	0	3	3	2
2023	Norway	WC	7	0	2	2	2
2024	Norway	WC	3	0	1	1	0
2024	Norway	OGQ	3	0	0	0	0
Junior totals			16	2	9	11	34
Senior totals			68	6	13	19	16
