= Kelly Zajac =

Canadian ice hockey player

- Born: June 6, 1988 (age 37) Winnipeg, Manitoba, Canada
- Height: 5 ft 10 in (178 cm)
- Weight: 174 lb (79 kg; 12 st 6 lb)
- Position: Forward
- Shot: Left
- Played for: Albany Devils; Lukko; Manitoba Moose; Hershey Bears
- NHL draft: Undrafted
- Playing career: 2012–2018

Kelly Zajac (born June 6, 1988) is a Canadian former professional ice hockey player. He played for the Union Dutchmen in the NCAA Men's Division I ECAC Hockey conference and in the American Hockey League for the Albany Devils, Manitoba Moose and Hershey Bears.

== Playing career ==
After finishing his collegiate hockey career with Union College, Zajac signed as a free agent with the AHL's Albany Devils in 2011. In August 2015, Zajac left the Devils organization and signed a one-year contract with Finnish Liiga club, Lukko, which included an initial two month try-out. Three months later, Zajac returned to the AHL after signing with the Manitoba Moose. The Moose released Zajac on February 12, 2016 after which Zajac signed with the South Carolina Stingrays.

Zajac originally opted to return to Europe for a second season in agreeing to a contract with Tingsryds AIF, however on May 22, 2016, Zajac decided to stay in North America after the conclusion of the 2015–16 season with the Stingrays. He then signed a two-way contract with the Hershey Bears and Stingrays for the 2016–17 season.

== Personal life ==
Kelly is the younger brother of professional hockey players Travis and Darcy Zajac. Their youngest brother, Nolan, played with the NCAA Denver Pioneers. Their father, Tom, also played for the University of Denver.

== Career statistics ==
			Regular season					Playoffs
Season	Team	League	GP	G	A	Pts	PIM	GP	G	A	Pts	PIM
2006–07	Salmon Arm Silverbacks	BCHL	59	11	20	31	20	11	0	0	0	4
2007–08	Salmon Arm Silverbacks	BCHL	60	21	41	62	28	11	3	8	11	4
2008–09	Union College	ECAC	39	6	14	20	29	—	—	—	—	—
2009–10	Union College	ECAC	39	10	14	24	10	—	—	—	—	—
2010–11	Union College	ECAC	40	13	29	42	16	—	—	—	—	—
2011–12	Union College	ECAC	41	8	34	42	10	—	—	—	—	—
2011–12	Albany Devils	AHL	3	0	0	0	0	—	—	—	—	—
2012–13	Albany Devils	AHL	14	2	2	4	0	—	—	—	—	—
2012–13	Trenton Devils	ECHL	15	6	10	16	8	—	—	—	—	—
2013–14	Albany Devils	AHL	67	12	32	44	4	4	0	2	2	2
2014–15	Albany Devils	AHL	24	3	10	13	18	—	—	—	—	—
2015–16	Lukko	Liiga	11	2	2	4	0	—	—	—	—	—
2015–16	Manitoba Moose	AHL	14	0	1	1	2	—	—	—	—	—
2015–16	South Carolina Stingrays	ECHL	21	9	13	22	0	19	3	15	18	2
2016–17	South Carolina Stingrays	ECHL	59	13	39	52	14	22	6	11	17	2
2016–17	Hershey Bears	AHL	9	4	3	7	2	—	—	—	—	—
2017–18	South Carolina Stingrays	ECHL	60	20	36	56	16	4	0	0	0	0
2017–18	Hershey Bears	AHL	2	0	1	1	0	—	—	—	—	—
AHL totals			133	21	49	70	26	4	0	2	2	2

== Awards and honours ==
Award	Year
College
All-ECAC Hockey Second Team	2010–11
All-ECAC Hockey Third Team	2011–12
ECAC Hockey Best Defensive Forward	2011–12

Awards and achievements
Preceded by Adam Presiznuik	ECAC Hockey Best Defensive Forward; 2011–12	Succeeded by Greg Miller
