= Teemu Lepaus =

Finnish ice hockey player (born 1993)

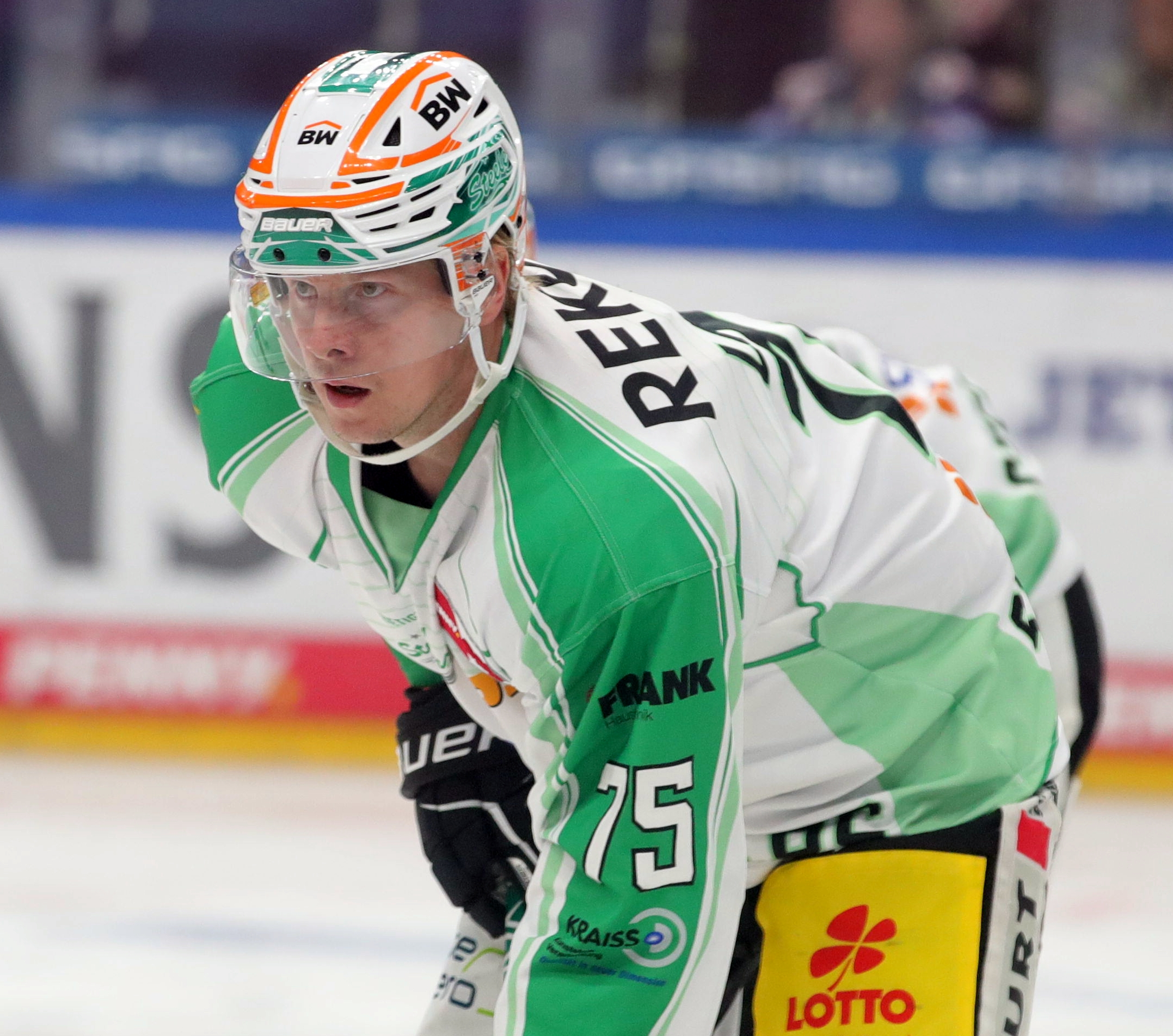
- Born: March 12, 1993 (age 33) Tampere, Finland
- Height: 182 cm (6 ft 0 in)
- Weight: 79 kg (174 lb; 12 st 6 lb)
- Position: Left wing
- Shoots: Left
- DEL team Former teams: Bietigheim Steelers; Ilves; Ässät; EHC Visp
- Playing career: 2015–present

Teemu Lepaus (born March 12, 1993) is a Finnish professional ice hockey player who plays for Bietigheim Steelers in the Deutsche Eishockey Liga (DEL). He also plays roller in-line hockey last time playing for Team Haippi winning the Finnish championships. He has also played for the Finnish men's team winning silver in the 2017 world championships.

== Playing career ==
In the 2014–15 season, Lepaus played in EHC Lustenau for 9 games. Lustenau won the INL championship that season. Lepaus also played in Suomi-sarja for Ketterä.

In the 2015–16 season Lepaus had moved to play for SaPKo in the Finnish second-tier league, Mestis. He played 40 games and put up 22 points. 12 of those were goals.

The next season, 2016–17 Lepaus played for SaPKo for the last time. He played 48 games and made 62 points, but only 16 were goals. SaPKo won the Mestis championship and Lepaus was chosen for the all-star team. Lepaus had the most playoff points (17) and the most assists (46). Lepaus was also chosen as the playoffs MVP.

For the next four seasons (2017–2021) Lepaus played in the Finnish first-tier league, SM-liiga. He was on the roster of Ilves. Lepaus played 203 games in those four seasons and put up 104 points. 41 of those were goals.

In 2021 Lepaus signed a one-year contract with Porin Ässät. But he went to EHC Visp in the middle of the season.

== Personal life ==
Lepaus' retired brother Toni played ice hockey in Mestis. Lepaus played football in Ilves when he was a kid.

== Career statistics ==
			Regular season					Playoffs
Season	Team	League	GP	G	A	Pts	PIM	GP	G	A	Pts	PIM
2011–12	Ilves	Jr. A	34	4	11	15	14	—	—	—	—	—
2012–13	Ilves	Jr. A	38	10	20	30	26	—	—	—	—	—
2013–14	Ilves	Jr. A	40	10	25	35	24	5	2	2	4	0
2014–15	EHC Lustenau	INL	9	3	9	12	6	—	—	—	—	—
2014–15	Ketterä	Suomi-sarja	14	3	13	16	—	—	—	—	—	—
2015–16	SaPKo	Mestis	40	12	10	22	39	—	—	—	—	—
2016–17	SapKo	Mestis	48	16	46	62	42	12	7	10	17	8
2017–18	Ilves	SM-l	56	8	16	24	39	—	—	—	—	—
2018–19	Ilves	SM-l	60	16	24	40	26	7	1	2	3	2
2019–20	Ilves	SM-l	49	6	12	18	10	—	—	—	—	—
2020–21	Ilves	SM-l	38	13	9	22	18	5	0	1	1	0
2021–22	Ässät	SM-l	34	7	9	16	6	—	—	—	—	—
2021–22	EHC Visp	SL	8	2	4	6	0	—	—	—	—	—
2022–23	Bietigheim Steelers	DEL	54	17	13	30	22	—	—	—	—	—
Liiga totals			237	50	70	120	99	12	1	3	4	2

== Roller in-line hockey ==
Medal record

Representing Finland

Roller in-line hockey

World Championships
Silver medal – second place	2017 Slovakia	

Finnish championships
Gold medal – first place	2021 Tampere, Finland	

Teemu Lepaus played in the 2017 roller in-line hockey championships for Finland men's national inline hockey team "Rullaleijonat". Teemu lepaus scored 22 points (tournaments best). Finland got 2nd place in the tournament.

In 2021 Lepaus was a part of Team Haippi in the Rullakiekon SM-liiga (Finnish top tier roller in-line hockey league). They won the tournament without losing one game. The team had the following players: Teemu Lepaus, Alexander Barkov, Eemeli Suomi, Aleksi Heponiemi, Jonatan Tanus, Kristian Tanus, Patrik Puistola, Henrik Haapala, Anton Levtchi and Lassi Yrjölä.
