= Travis Zajac =

Canadian ice hockey player (born 1985)

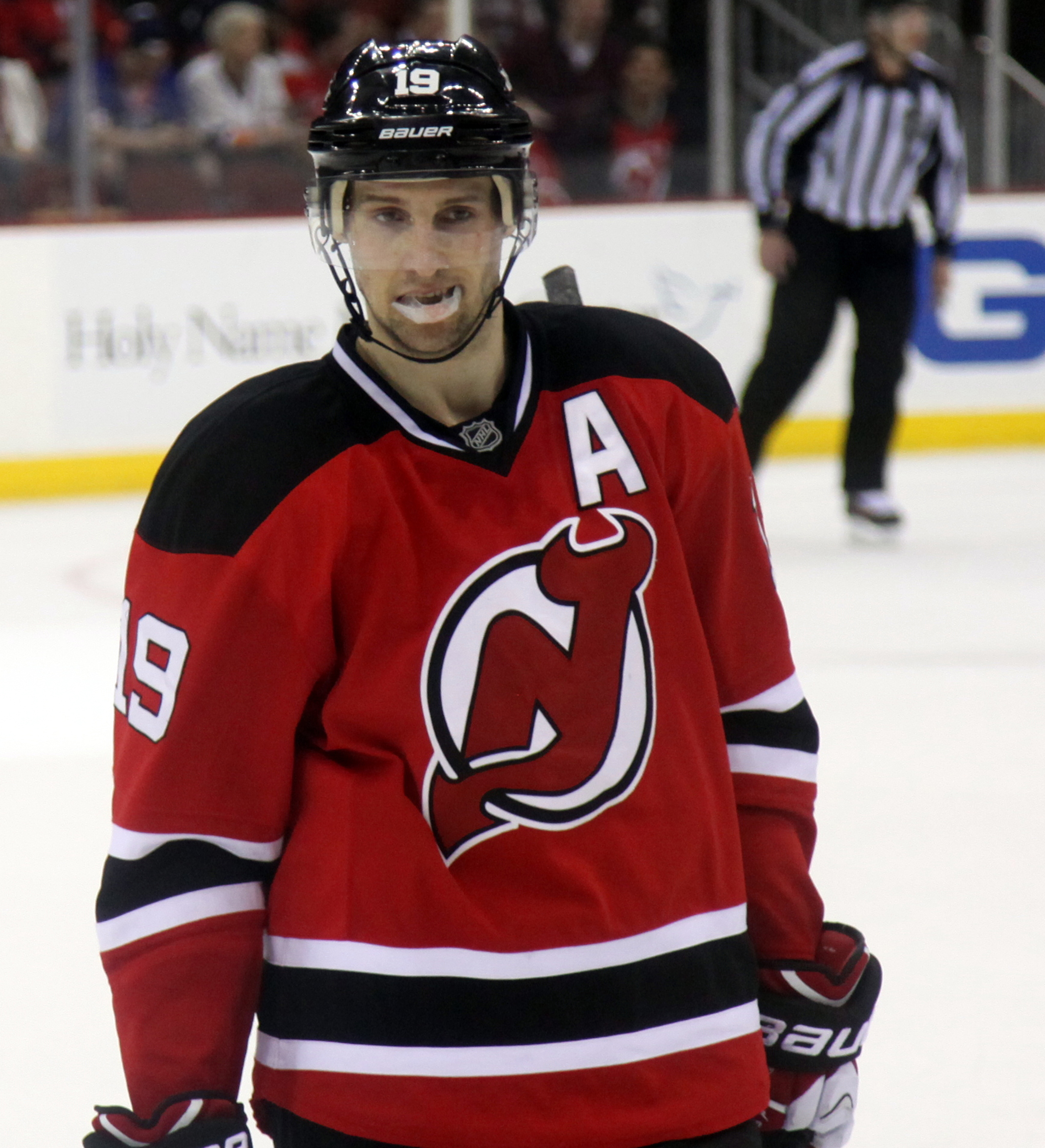
- Zajac with the New Jersey Devils in 2014
- Born: May 13, 1985 (age 41) Winnipeg, Manitoba, Canada
- Height: 6 ft 2 in (188 cm)
- Weight: 185 lb (84 kg; 13 st 3 lb)
- Position: Centre
- Shot: Right
- Played for: New Jersey Devils; New York Islanders
- National team: Canada
- NHL draft: 20th overall, 2004; New Jersey Devils
- Playing career: 2006–2021

Travis Zajac (/ˈzeɪdʒæk/; Polish pronunciation: [ˈzajɔ̃ts]; born May 13, 1985) is a Canadian former professional ice hockey centre. Zajac was selected in the first round, 20th overall, by the New Jersey Devils in the 2004 NHL entry draft. He played more than 1,000 NHL games with the team over 15 years, and retired after a brief stint with the New York Islanders.

== Playing career ==
=== Amateur ===
Zajac began his junior ice hockey career with the Salmon Arm Silverbacks of the British Columbia Hockey League (BCHL). One of his teammates was Brady Murray, who would briefly play in the NHL for the Los Angeles Kings, and his linemate was future Calgary Flames winger Kris Chucko. In his second season with Salmon Arm, Zajac led the team in goals, assists and points, and finished second overall in the League in the latter two statistics. At season's end, he was named the MVP of the BCHL's Interior Division, and he played in the BCHL All-Star Game. His play attracted attention, and he was projected to be a potential first-round draft pick in the 2004 NHL entry draft. The projection proved accurate, as the New Jersey Devils would take him with the 20th overall pick. The Devils traded up to get Zajac, which "mean[t] a lot" to him, but was not a surprise, as the Devils scouted him more than any other team. Zajac opted to play college ice hockey for the University of North Dakota rather than major junior hockey in the Canadian Hockey League (CHL), as he wanted an education in addition to playing hockey. Then-Devils General Manager Lou Lamoriello commented that there would be room for Zajac on the North Dakota roster because the Devils were recalling forward Zach Parise, drafted the year earlier, to play professional hockey.

In his first season with North Dakota, Zajac scored 17 goals and 19 assists for 36 points, while only accumulating 16 penalty minutes. The Fighting Sioux, as the team's nickname was then known, advanced to the 2005 NCAA Division I Men's Ice Hockey Tournament as the second seed in the East Regional. Zajac scored two goals in the Regional Final, as the Sioux beat Boston College to make it to the Frozen Four. He added two more in the semifinal game against the University of Minnesota as the Sioux won 4–2. Although the Sioux lost to the University of Denver in the championship game, Zajac tallied a power-play goal to tie the game. Despite the loss, he was named to the Championship All-Tournament Team, as well as the NCAA East All-Tournament Team and the Western Collegiate Hockey Association (WCHA) All-Rookie Team.

The following year, Zajac finished the season with 18 goals and 29 assists for 47 points. That season, the Sioux featured several future NHL players, including Taylor Chorney, Brian Lee, T. J. Oshie, Chris Porter, Matt Smaby, Drew Stafford and Jonathan Toews. The Sioux won the Broadmoor Trophy as the WCHA playoff champion, and advanced once again to the NCAA tournament. After defeating the University of Michigan and Holy Cross, the Sioux were in the Frozen Four for the second-straight year, but lost to Boston College in the semifinals. Zajac scored three goals and three assists during the tournament, including two assists and a goal against Boston College.

=== Professional ===
==== New Jersey Devils (2006–2021) ====
After North Dakota's season was over, Zajac signed an entry-level contract with the Devils, forgoing his last two seasons of college eligibility. He scored one assist and earned two penalty minutes in two appearances with the Devils' American Hockey League (AHL) affiliate, the Albany River Rats. Despite being considered to have an outside chance at making the Devils' roster out of training camp, Zajac survived the first round of cuts and eventually made it to the roster on opening night of the 2006–07 season. He scored his first career NHL goal in the second game of the season against the Dallas Stars. Zajac was placed on the Devils' second line with former North Dakota standout Zach Parise and veteran winger Jamie Langenbrunner. The line was dubbed "ZZ Pop(s)," owing to Zajac and Zach's initials and Langenbrunner's veteran status ("Pop(s)"). Zajac would miss two games in October due to a leg injury; as of the end of the 2010–11 season, they are the only two games Zajac had missed in his professional career. Zajac would net three assists against the Ottawa Senators in a November game. Midway through the season, to spark the Devils' offense, Zajac and Langenbrunner were placed on a line with then-captain Patrik Eliáš. Later in the season, Zajac notched his first NHL two-goal game against the Philadelphia Flyers, and had an eight-game point streak in late March. In addition, Zajac saw time on the power play unit, scoring six goals with the man advantage. He would finish the season with 17 goals and 25 assists; his 42 points were good enough for seventh among NHL rookies, as well as seventh among all Devils players. In the 2007 Stanley Cup playoffs, Zajac scored his first career NHL post-season point with an assist in Game 3 of the Eastern Conference Quarterfinals against the Tampa Bay Lightning. He would add two more assists in the series, as the Devils would win the series in six games. In Game 1 of the Semifinals against Ottawa, Zajac would score his first career post-season goal; the Senators, however, won the game 5–4. Although Zajac earned an assist on linemate Langenbrunner's overtime goal in Game 2, the Devils were eliminated in five games. Zajac finished tenth in voting for the Calder Memorial Trophy, awarded to the NHL's rookie of the year, and won the Devils' Fan Club award for Rookie of the Year.

At the start of Zajac's sophomore season, he was still centering the second line with Zach Parise; Brian Gionta replaced Langenbrunner on right wing while the latter recovered from sports hernia surgery. Zajac scored his first goal of the season in the team's fifth game against the Atlanta Thrashers, a 6–5 Devils win. In October, he was moved up to the top line, centering Gionta and Eliáš, and saw an increase in time on the power play unit. January 2008 was a good month for Zajac – he had a four-game point streak, during which he tied his career high with a three-point game (three assists) against the Flyers. Despite finishing with six multi-point games for the season, he saw an overall drop in production; he finished the season with just 14 goals and 20 assists. He had one assist in five playoff games as the Devils were eliminated in the first round by the rival New York Rangers.

"I'm able to do different things with the puck and, as a result, we're able to make plays that maybe we wouldn't have made last year. We all have each other's back and that's a good thing."

— Zajac, on his chemistry with ZZ-Pop linemates Zach Parise and Jamie Langenbrunner

Heading into the 2008–09 season, the ZZ Pop line was the Devils' top line, making Zajac the team's number one centre. He responded well to the role, crediting the chemistry he had with Parise and Langenbrunner as the reason for a boost in confidence. In particular, he cited his relationship with Parise, who also attended North Dakota, as helpful to his game; he felt Parise was a "big brother." In his only shootout attempt of the season, he scored the game-winning goal against the Flyers on December 21, and later that month scored his 100th career NHL point against the Rangers. He notched points in six straight games from late January to early February. His season mark of +33 was first on the team and tied for fourth in the League, after finishing –11 the year before. All told, Zajac set career highs in goals (20), assists (42) and points (62), as the ZZ Top line combined for 94 goals and 225 points. In addition to his point-scoring abilities, Zajac improved his faceoff prowess, winning 53.1 percent of his faceoffs. In the 2009 playoffs, Zajac netted one goal and three assists in seven games as the Devils lost in the first round to the Carolina Hurricanes.

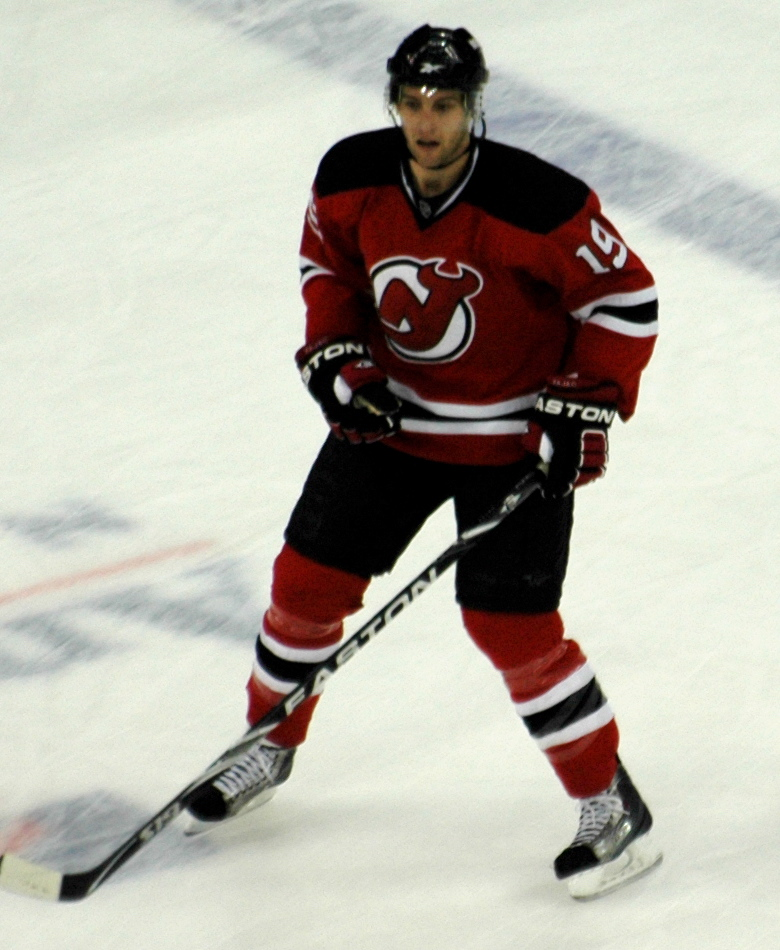
Zajac with the Devils in November 2010

During the subsequent off-season, Zajac signed a multi-year contract extension with the Devils, avoiding salary arbitration. The 2009–10 season was one of many milestones for Zajac; he notched his 100th career assist in November, his 200th career point in March and appeared in his 300th game in February. In January, he scored his first career overtime goal against the Toronto Maple Leafs. He had another six-game point-scoring streak from February to March, during which he scored three goals. Zajac surpassed his previous year's totals in goals (25) and points (67), while tying his previous career best in assists (42). The ZZ-Pop line continued to flourish, as Parise, Zajac and Langenbrunner finished 1–2–3, respectively, in team scoring; Zajac was second to Parise in all three major statistical categories. He once again led the team in faceoffs, winning 52.9% of his draws.

Zajac had high expectations heading into his fifth season. Replacing Langenbrunner on the top line was Ilya Kovalchuk, whom the Devils acquired at the trade deadline the previous year in a blockbuster trade, and re-signed to a controversial 15-year deal in the off-season. Parise wanted Zajac to shoot more, saying he had "one of the best shots on [the] team." However, the "ZIP Line," as it was known, never found chemistry, and Kovalchuk was replaced by Dainius Zubrus shortly into the season. Zajac's productivity took another hit when Parise tore his meniscus and was sidelined for several months. Further injuries and poor play forced Head Coach John MacLean to shuffle his lines further; Zajac's linemates for the first half of the season included Parise, Langenbrunner, Kovalchuk, Zubrus, Brian Rolston, David Clarkson, Eliáš and Adam Mair. Despite the lack of stability for his wingmen, Zajac's faceoff ability continued to improve. He credited Assistant Coach Adam Oates, considered one of the premier faceoff men of his era, with the improvement. Following the firing of MacLean and the trading of captain Langenbrunner, the Devils found themselves playing better under returning Head Coach Jacques Lemaire. Zajac snapped a five-game pointless streak, and shortly thereafter scored a short-handed goal and added three assists in just three games. Finding consistency on a line with Kovalchuk and rookie Nick Palmieri, his offense improved; during a 20-game streak, he scored five goals and added 11 assists. On March 15, Zajac tied Ken Daneyko's team record for consecutive games played (388); he broke the record the following game against Ottawa. Although the Devils did not qualify for the 2011 playoffs, Zajac won the team's Unsung Hero award.

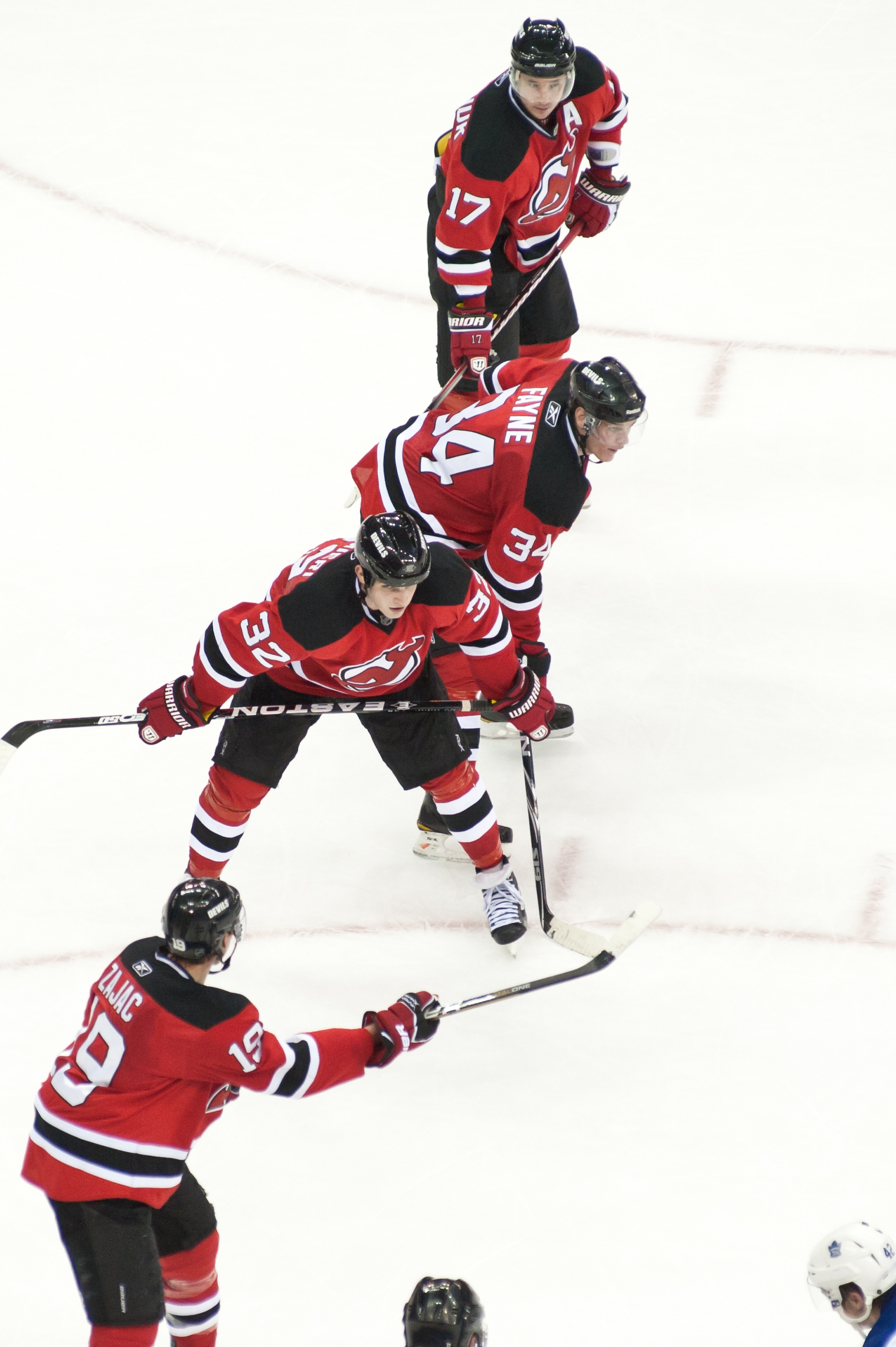
Zajac (foreground) instructing his teammates prior to a face-off, April 2011

On April 24, 2012, Zajac scored his second career overtime goal against the Florida Panthers in Game 6 of the Eastern Conference Quarterfinals, to force a Game 7, which the Devils also won in double Overtime.

Hw re-signed with the Devils in January 2013, committing to an eight-year, $46 million contract. He recorded his first career hat-trick against Florida Panthers on March 31, 2014. While the 2017–18 season brought the Devils back to the Stanley Cup playoffs for the first time since 2012, he played his fewest games since the 2012–13 season due to a pectoral injury that required surgery. He played his 1,000th career game for the Devils against the Washington Capitals on February 21, 2021. On March 30, 2021, during a game against the Boston Bruins, Zajac scored his 200th career goal.

==== New York Islanders (2021) ====
During the pandemic-delayed 2020–21 season, while in the final season of his eight-year contract and his 15th season within the Devils organization, on April 7, 2021, Zajac was traded to the New York Islanders along with Kyle Palmieri, in exchange for a first-round pick in the 2021 NHL entry draft, a conditional 2022 fourth-round pick, and forwards A. J. Greer and Mason Jobst.

==== Retirement ====
On September 20, 2021, Zajac signed a one-day contract to retire with the Devils. Zajac was honored during a Devils game against the Winnipeg Jets on March 10, 2022, for playing 1,000 games with the team, where he also performed a ceremonial puck drop.

== International play ==
Medal record

Representing Canada

Ice hockey

World Championships
Silver medal – second place	2009 Switzerland	

Zajac was a member of Team Canada at the 2009 IIHF World Championship. He scored no points in five games, and helped Canada to a silver medal, losing to Russia in the final. He was later named as an alternate captain to the Canadian team for the 2011 IIHF World Championship. He would finish with a goal and two assists in seven games as Canada finished in fifth place.

== Playing style ==
"I'm a big, physical forward who can beat guys one-on-one... Drive the puck to the net. I win the battles in the corners. Pretty offensively skilled, more of my game is offensive, but defensively I'm pretty sound. A pretty versatile player. Play in all situations."

— Zajac, on his style of play in 2004

Zajac is credited for being a versatile player, able to play on the power play and penalty kill equally well. Former coach Jacques Lemaire called him "the most complete player" on the team. When they were on the same line, Parise credited his offensive output to Zajac's defensive responsibility.

== Personal life ==
Zajac's father played hockey for three years at the University of Denver. Travis's three brothers, Darcy, Kelly and Nolan, all play ice hockey as well. He married former captain of the University of New Hampshire women's ice hockey team Nicole Hekle in 2009. The couple have three children.

== Career statistics ==
=== Regular season and playoffs ===
			Regular season					Playoffs
Season	Team	League	GP	G	A	Pts	PIM	GP	G	A	Pts	PIM
2001–02	St. James Canadians	MJHL	63	19	36	55	18	—	—	—	—	—
2002–03	Salmon Arm Silverbacks	BCHL	59	16	36	52	27	—	—	—	—	—
2003–04	Salmon Arm Silverbacks	BCHL	59	43	69	112	110	14	10	13	23	10
2004–05	University of North Dakota	WCHA	43	17	19	36	16	—	—	—	—	—
2005–06	University of North Dakota	WCHA	45	17	27	44	20	—	—	—	—	—
2005–06	Albany River Rats	AHL	2	0	1	1	2	—	—	—	—	—
2006–07	New Jersey Devils	NHL	80	17	25	42	16	11	1	4	5	4
2007–08	New Jersey Devils	NHL	82	14	20	34	31	5	0	1	1	4
2008–09	New Jersey Devils	NHL	82	20	42	62	29	7	1	3	4	6
2009–10	New Jersey Devils	NHL	82	25	42	67	24	5	1	1	2	2
2010–11	New Jersey Devils	NHL	82	13	31	44	24	—	—	—	—	—
2011–12	New Jersey Devils	NHL	15	2	4	6	4	24	7	7	14	4
2012–13	New Jersey Devils	NHL	48	7	13	20	22	—	—	—	—	—
2013–14	New Jersey Devils	NHL	80	18	30	48	28	—	—	—	—	—
2014–15	New Jersey Devils	NHL	74	11	14	25	29	—	—	—	—	—
2015–16	New Jersey Devils	NHL	74	14	28	42	25	—	—	—	—	—
2016–17	New Jersey Devils	NHL	80	14	31	45	33	—	—	—	—	—
2017–18	New Jersey Devils	NHL	63	12	14	26	25	5	1	1	2	0
2018–19	New Jersey Devils	NHL	80	19	27	46	20	—	—	—	—	—
2019–20	New Jersey Devils	NHL	69	9	16	25	28	—	—	—	—	—
2020–21	New Jersey Devils	NHL	33	7	11	18	6	—	—	—	—	—
2020–21	New York Islanders	NHL	13	1	1	2	0	14	1	1	2	6
NHL totals			1,037	203	349	552	344	71	12	18	30	26

=== International ===
Year	Team	Event	Result	GP	G	A	Pts	PIM
2009	Canada	WC	2nd place, silver medalist(s)	5	0	0	0	2
2011	Canada	WC	5th	7	1	2	3	2
Senior totals				12	1	2	3	4

== Awards and honours ==
Award	Year
BCHL
BCHL Interior Division MVP	2004
BCHL All-Star Game	2004
College
WCHA All-Rookie Team	2004–05
All-NCAA All-Tournament Team	2005
New Jersey Devils
Fan Club Rookie of the Year	2007
Unsung Hero	2011

== Notes ==
^1The Devils traded their first-round draft pick (22nd overall) and third-round draft pick (88th overall) to the Dallas Stars in exchange for Dallas' first-round pick (20th overall).

== See also ==
- List of NHL players with 1,000 games played

Awards and achievements
Preceded by Zach Parise	New Jersey Devils first-round draft pick 2004	Succeeded by Niclas Bergfors
