= Stavanger Oilers =

Ice hockey team in Norway

- City: Stavanger, Norway
- League: EliteHockey Ligaen
- Founded: 10 November 2000; 25 years ago
- Home arena: DNB Arena
- Colors: Black, White, Yellow
- Owner: Tore Christiansen
- General manager: Pål Haukali Higson
- Head coach: Anders Gjøse
- Captain: Mathias Trettenes
- Website: oilers.no

Championships
- Regular season titles: 7 (2011/12, 2014/15, 2015/16, 2016/17, 2019/20, 2021/22, 2022/23)
- Playoff championships: 9 (2010, 2012, 2013, 2014, 2015, 2016, 2017, 2022, 2023)

Stavanger Ishockeyklubb, commonly referred to as the Stavanger Oilers, is a Norwegian professional ice hockey team based in Stavanger, Norway. They currently play in the EliteHockey Ligaen, which is the top division in Norwegian ice hockey. As of 2023, it is the only team in the league from western Norway. The Oilers play their home matches in DNB Arena. The team colours are black, white and yellow.

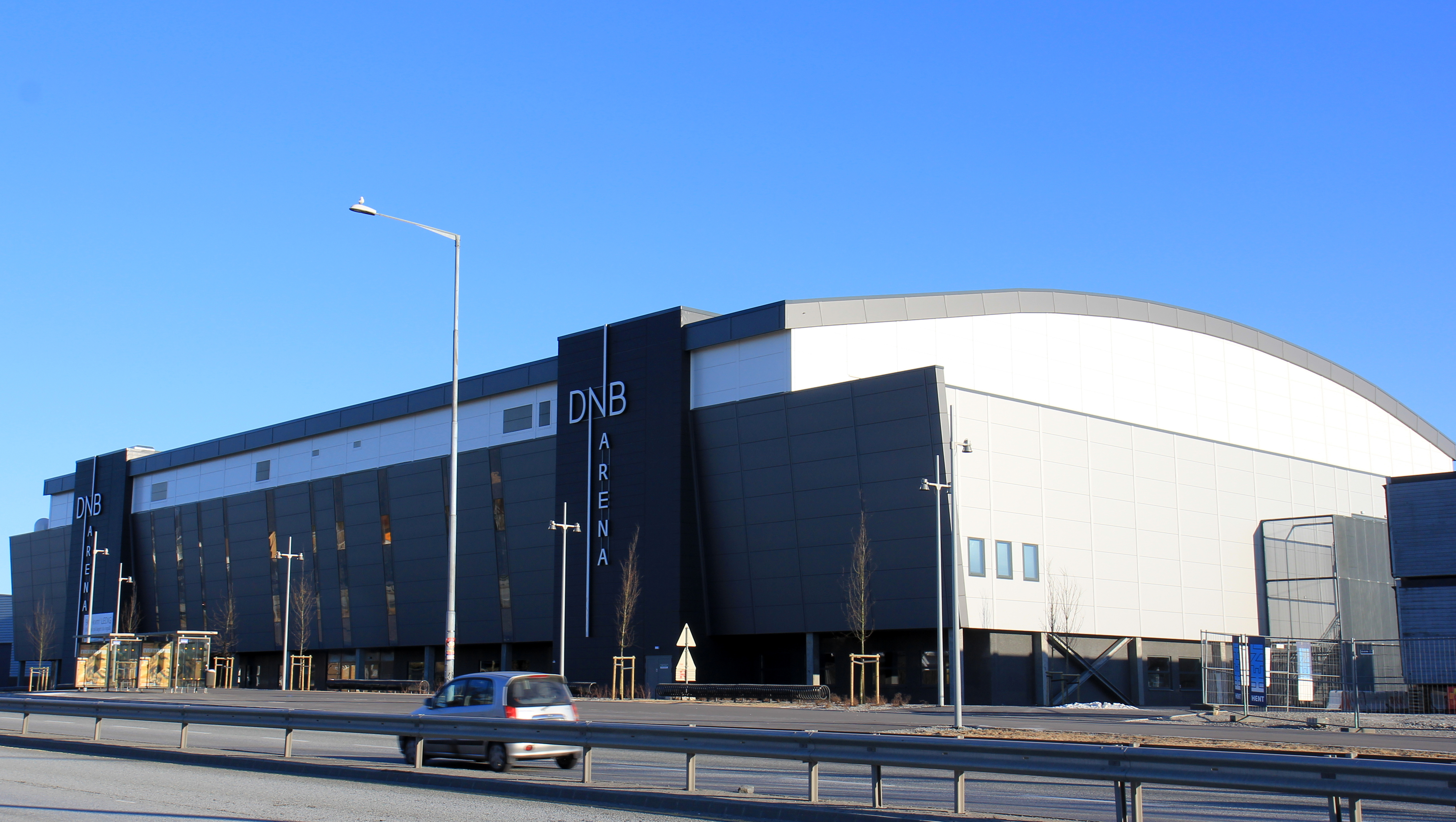
DNB Arena, the home arena of Stavanger Oilers, was opened in 2012. It has a capacity of 4377 spectators

== History ==
The Stavanger Oilers were established as a company team by Finnish expatriate workers in 2000. Viking Hockey had traditionally been the dominant hockey club in Stavanger. The club's establishment was led by the Finnish businessman Hartti Kristola, who withdrew his economic support from Viking to focus on the Oilers.

The club played their first official game in the autumn of 2001, with players from the higher divisions of Finnish hockey, as well as a number of former Norwegian national ice hockey team players. These played alongside amateur local players. The Stavanger Oilers, starting at the bottom of the league system, went through the 2001/02 season unbeaten, scoring 304 goals. The club top scorer, Finnish forward Jari Kesti, scored or assisted on 226 of them.

In 2002/03 the Oilers went through their first 18 games unbeaten. Ahead of the season, the team received more Finnish players, as well as two of Viking Hockey's players, Tommy Edlund and Thomas Kristensen. The club's first loss came away against Gjøvik Hockey, was followed by another loss the next day to the same team. The Oilers also got beaten by local rivals Bergen IK, who were the first team to defeat the Oilers in Siddishallen. The team reached first place at the end of the season, with Bergen finishing second. Player Jari Kesti scored 150 points from the Oilers 296 goals, and countrymen Tomi Suoniemi and Jarkko Ollikainen both scored more than 100 points. Promotion to the GET-ligaen was secured following five victories in the qualification play-offs, with the only defeat coming against Bergen in a penalty shootout.

Ahead of its first season in the GET-ligaen, more Finnish players and some young Norwegian players joined the Oilers. At the start of the season the team beat Lillehammer 5–1 in the opening match, followed by a 10–0 away win at Manglerud Star in the second match. The first defeat came at home against fellow promoters Bergen. At the end of the season, the Oilers finished sixth in the table. Again, Jari Kesti was the club top scorer, for the third season in a row. In the playoffs, the Oilers beat Trondheim by three games to one in the quarter-finals, winning the final game in sudden death in front of a sell-out crowd of 2600 people in Siddishallen. Teemu Kohvakka scored the deciding goal with only 14 seconds left of the first period of sudden death. In the semifinals, the Oilers were beaten by Storhamar in three straight games.

The second elite season saw two players leave the club: Jari Kesti signed for Vålerenga and Christian Dahl Andersen went to Swedish side Arboga. Both came back during the same seasons, after unsuccessful stints in their new clubs. Owner Hartti Kristola withdrew his financial backing, and a local business executive, Tore Christensen, took over control of the club. The Oilers' performances varied throughout the season, and after a loss against bottom side Bergen, Matti Riekkinen resigned as the team coach. He was replaced by Swede Gunnar Johansson in January 2005. The team finished the season in seventh place, losing against Vålerenga in the play-off quarter-finals.

Ahead of the 2005/06 season, Swedish players Bengt Höglund, Martin Johansson and Fredrik Sundin were brought in, along with the Norwegian national team player Snorre Hallem. The club had its best season to date, finishing in fourth place in the GET-ligaen. In the playoffs, the Oilers beat Sparta Warriors by four games to two in the quarter-finals. In the semi-finals against second-placed Stjernen, each team won their home games until the Oilers decided the series through a 2–1 victory in the seventh and final game of the series, away at Stjernehallen. The first-ever play-off final featured a hockey team from Stavanger ended in a defeat in four straight games against Vålerenga.

In the 2006/07 season, players joining included Henric Höglund from Stjernen and Norwegian national team players Marius Trygg and Lars Peder Nagel. At the end of the season, they finished in third place, which was still the club's best result to date. This was the third time that a team from Stavanger had won the bronze medals in the league, with Viking winning the bronze twice in the past. At the end of the season, past players Jari Kesti and Tomi Suoniemi were also honoured, as their respective shirt numbers, #7 and #22, were officially retired by the club. In the playoffs Comet were beaten by four games to two in the quarter-finals, while the Oilers lost to the Storhamar Dragons by the same score-line in the semi-finals. The club won the 2013–14 IIHF Continental Cup.

The Stavanger Oilers had a dominant 2022-2023 season in the Norwegian Eliteserien, claiming the regular season title and finishing first overall. Their offense was particularly impressive, racking up 192 goals while allowing just 83 over the 45-game season. The Oilers' consistency led them into the playoffs, where they continued to perform at a high level, eventually winning the league championship.

Key players for the team included forward Dan Kissel, known for his offensive contributions and experience. Alongside him, Bryce Gervais, another standout forward, added significant depth to their scoring lineup, contributing crucial points throughout the season. Martin Lefebvre also played a crucial role on defense, not only fortifying the team’s backline but also contributing offensively with a strong two-way game. Veteran Norwegian forward Tommy Kristiansen brought physicality and leadership, while Markus Søberg added both experience and skill, playing a central role in the team’s forward group.

Goaltending was another strong point, with Henrik Holm providing a reliable last line of defense. Holm's performance in net helped secure the Oilers' low goals-against record, reinforcing their position as one of the toughest teams to score against. With contributions across their lineup, the Stavanger Oilers’ team effort and standout individual performances were key to their championship-winning season.

== Players ==
=== Current roster ===
As of 13 September 2024

No.	Nat	Player	Pos	S/G	Age	Acquired	Birthplace
64	(Norway)	Didrik Baanerud	F	L	20	2023	Kongsvinger, Norway
13	(Norway)	Sondre Bjerke	D	L	30	2023	Oslo, Norway
81	(Norway)	Oliver Calik	C	L	22	2023	Huddinge, Sweden
92	(United States)	Nick Dineen	C	R	37	2022	Omaha, Nebraska, United States
26	(Norway)	Patrick Rørbu Elvsveen	F	L	23	2023	Hamar, Norway
18	(Norway)	Martin Gran	RW	R	29	2023	Hamar, Norway
78	(Norway)	Anders Tangen Henriksen	RW	R	31	2022	Stavanger, Norway
1	(Norway)	Jens Auke Hoekstra	G	L	22	2023	Stavanger, Norway
10	(Norway)	Ludvig Hoff	LW	L	29	2019	Oslo, Norway
38	(Norway)	Henrik Holm	G	R	35	2011	Fredrikstad, Norway
85	(Norway)	Christoffer Karlsen	RW	R	28	2021	Sarpsborg, Norway
46	(United States)	Dan Kissel (A)	LW	L	39	2019	Crestwood, Illinois, United States
5	(Norway)	Andreas Klavestad	D	R	30	2019	Sarpsborg, Norway
55	(Ukraine)	Mykola Kosarev	D	L	18	2024	Kharkiv, Ukraine
29	(Canada)	Pascal Laberge	C	R	28	2024	Châteauguay, Quebec, Canada
23	(Canada)	Tristan Langan	C	L	27	2023	Swan River, Manitoba, Canada
82	(Norway)	Jonas Meisingset	D	L	26	2024	Sarpsborg, Norway
77	(Norway)	Håkon Løken Pedersen	D	L	28	2024	Fredrikstad, Norway
9	(Canada)	Evan Polei	LW	L	30	2024	Wetaskiwin, Alberta, Canada
16	(Norway)	André Bjelland Strandborg (A)	C	L	24	2019	Stavanger, Norway
8	(Norway)	Mathias Trettenes (C)	C	L	32	2023	Stavanger, Norway
31	(Norway)	Marcus Walberg	G	L	20	2024	Fredrikstad, Norway
25	(United States)	Cliff Watson	D	L	32	2023	Sheboygan, Wisconsin, United States
19	(Sweden)	Alexander Ytterell	D	R	35	2024	Vetlanda, Sweden
4	(Norway)	Kristian Sjødahl Østby	D	L	30	2020	Sarpsborg, Norway

== Honours ==
- Norwegian Champions (9): 2010, 2012, 2013, 2014, 2015, 2016, 2017, 2022, 2023
- Regular season champions (7): 2011–12, 2014–15, 2015–16, 2016–17, 2019–20, 2021–22, 2022–23
- IIHF Continental Cup (1): 2013–14

== Season-by-season results ==
This is a partial list of the last five seasons completed by the Oilers. For the full season-by-season history, see List of Stavanger Oilers seasons.

Norwegian Champions	Regular Season Champions	Promoted	Relegated

Season	League	Regular season									Postseason
Season	League	GP	W	L	OTW	OTL	GF	GA	Pts	Finish	Postseason
2018–19	Eliteserien	48	28	8	5	7	172	109	101	3rd	Lost in Semi-finals, 2–4 (Storhamar)
2019–20	Eliteserien	45	34	4	4	3	194	90	113	1st	The play-offs were cancelled
2020–21	Eliteserien	24	15	7	1	1	97	52	48	3rd	The play-offs were cancelled
2021–22	Eliteserien	45	30	6	6	3	162	89	105	1st	Won Norwegian Championship, 4–0 (Storhamar)
2022–23	Eliteserien	45	31	10	2	2	192	83	99	1st	Won Norwegian Championship, 4–3 (Storhamar)
2023-2024	Eliteserien	45	31	8	1	5	165	92	100	2nd	Semifinal loss

== Retired numbers ==
Retired numbers
No.	Player	Position	Career	Number retirement
7	Jari Kesti	C	2001–2004, 2005–2006	7 September 2006
22	Tomi Suoniemi	C	2001–2006	7 September 2006
