= Darcy Zajac =

Canadian ice hockey player

- Born: September 23, 1986 (age 40) Winnipeg, Manitoba, Canada
- Height: 6 ft 1 in (185 cm)
- Weight: 201 lb (91 kg; 14 st 5 lb)
- Position: Forward
- Shoots: Right
- Played for: Albany Devils; SønderjyskE Ishockey; Coventry Blaze
- NHL draft: Undrafted
- Playing career: 2010–present

Darcy Zajac (born September 23, 1986) is a Canadian professional ice hockey player who last played for the Lorenskog Is of the Get-Ligen (Norway). He previously played for the Albany Devils of the American Hockey League.

== Career ==
Prior to turning professional, Zajac attended the University of North Dakota where he played NCAA Division 1 hockey for the North Dakota Fighting Sioux.

Zajac joined the Albany Devils in 2010. He signed a two-year, two-way contract with the New Jersey Devils in 2013. After his contract with the Devils' organization expired in 2015, he joined the Danish club SønderjyskE.

For the 2016–17 season, Zajac joined the UK's Coventry Blaze. However Zajac left to go play in Lorenskog Norway in October 2016.

== Personal life ==
Darcy is the second of four Zajac brothers. His older brother, Travis, is a former professional ice hockey forward who played 15 NHL seasons from 2006 to 2021 with the New Jersey Devils and New York Islanders and his younger brother Kelly played in the ECHL. The youngest brother, Nolan, played with the NCAA Denver Pioneers. Their father, Tom, also played for the University of Denver.

== Career statistics ==
			Regular season					Playoffs
Season	Team	League	GP	G	A	Pts	PIM	GP	G	A	Pts	PIM
2004–05	Salmon Arm Silverbacks	BCHL	60	12	21	33	75	11	5	7	12	9
2005–06	Salmon Arm Silverbacks	BCHL	57	37	43	80	76	10	6	4	10	12
2006–07	North Dakota Fighting Sioux	WCHA	41	8	2	10	18	—	—	—	—	—
2007–08	North Dakota Fighting Sioux	WCHA	41	3	5	8	46	—	—	—	—	—
2008–09	North Dakota Fighting Sioux	WCHA	43	5	12	17	32	—	—	—	—	—
2009–10	North Dakota Fighting Sioux	WCHA	41	8	11	19	49	—	—	—	—	—
2009–10	Adirondack Phantoms	AHL	2	0	0	0	4	—	—	—	—	—
2010–11	Trenton Devils	ECHL	32	6	17	23	35	—	—	—	—	—
2010–11	Albany Devils	AHL	40	4	5	9	60	—	—	—	—	—
2011–12	Albany Devils	AHL	66	8	16	24	86	—	—	—	—	—
2012–13	Albany Devils	AHL	67	9	8	17	86	—	—	—	—	—
2013–14	Albany Devils	AHL	19	1	5	6	43	4	0	0	0	0
2014–15	Albany Devils	AHL	71	8	15	23	83	—	—	—	—	—
AHL totals			265	30	49	79	362	4	0	0	0	0
