= Tyler Shelast =

Canadian ice hockey player

- Born: December 26, 1984 (age 41) Kelowna, British Columbia, Canada
- Height: 6 ft 1 in (185 cm)
- Weight: 202 lb (92 kg; 14 st 6 lb)
- Position: Forward
- Shot: Right
- Played for: AHL; Iowa Stars; Hamilton Bulldogs; Texas Stars; ECHL; Idaho Steelheads; Stockton Thunder; Trenton Titans; Florida Everblades; South Carolina Stingrays; Evansville Icemen; Kalamazoo Wings; CHL; Allen Americans; Quad City Mallards
- NHL draft: Undrafted
- Playing career: 2008–2013

Tyler Shelast
Current position
- Title: Assistant coach
- Team: Michigan Tech
- Conference: CCHA

Biographical details
- Education: Michigan Technological University

Coaching career (HC unless noted)
- 2013–2021: Michigan Tech (conditioning)
- 2021–Present: Michigan Tech (assistant)

Tyler Shelast (born December 26, 1984) is a Canadian former professional ice hockey player who last played for the Kalamazoo Wings in the ECHL.

Undrafted after a collegiate career with Michigan Tech of the Western Collegiate Hockey Association, on March 20, 2008, the Dallas Stars of the National Hockey League signed Shelast to a two-year entry-level contract.

Following the 2009–10 season within the Stars minor league affiliates, Shelast did not receive a qualifying offer from the club, allowing him to become an unrestricted free agent on July 1, 2010.

Currently, Shelast is serving as the Strength & Conditioning Coach for the Michigan Technological University (Houghton, MI) varsity hockey team.

== Career statistics ==
			Regular season					Playoffs
Season	Team	League	GP	G	A	Pts	PIM	GP	G	A	Pts	PIM
2002–03	Powell River Kings	BCHL	43	22	22	44	50	—	—	—	—	—
2003–04	Powell River Kings	BCHL	58	25	42	67	131	7	1	3	4	6
2004–05	Michigan Tech	WCHA	37	11	8	19	42	—	—	—	—	—
2005–06	Michigan Tech	WCHA	37	9	9	18	44	—	—	—	—	—
2006–07	Michigan Tech	WCHA	38	15	9	24	18	—	—	—	—	—
2007–08	Michigan Tech	WHCA	39	16	10	26	26	—	—	—	—	—
2007–08	Iowa Stars	AHL	11	1	1	2	0	—	—	—	—	—
2008–09	Hamilton Bulldogs	AHL	17	2	1	3	4	—	—	—	—	—
2008–09	Idaho Steelheads	ECHL	31	9	12	21	23	4	0	0	0	4
2009–10	Texas Stars	AHL	32	2	3	5	20	—	—	—	—	—
2009–10	Allen Americans	CHL	5	2	1	3	2	—	—	—	—	—
2010–11	Quad City Mallards	CHL	53	19	22	41	29	4	0	2	2	2
2011–12	Stockton Thunder	ECHL	2	0	0	0	0	—	—	—	—	—
2011–12	Trenton Titans	ECHL	6	0	1	1	2	—	—	—	—	—
2011–12	Florida Everblades	ECHL	10	1	2	3	4	—	—	—	—	—
2011–12	South Carolina Stingrays	ECHL	19	3	4	7	7	—	—	—	—	—
2012–13	Evansville IceMen	ECHL	14	1	0	1	9	—	—	—	—	—
2012–13	Kalamazoo Wings	ECHL	41	6	6	12	12	—	—	—	—	—
AHL totals			60	5	5	10	24	—	—	—	—	—
