= Cody Brookwell =

Canadian ice hockey defenceman

- Born: September 14, 1986 (age 39) Calgary, Alberta, Canada
- Height: 6 ft 4 in (193 cm)
- Weight: 225 lb (102 kg; 16 st 1 lb)
- Position: Defence
- Shoots: Right
- EIHL team Former teams: Belfast Giants; Gwinnett Gladiators (ECHL)
- NHL draft: Undrafted
- Playing career: 2010–present

Cody Brookwell (born September 14, 1986) is a Canadian former ice hockey defenceman who most recently played professionally for the Belfast Giants in the British Elite Ice Hockey League (EIHL) for two seasons.

Brookwell attended the University of Denver where he played four seasons (2006 – 2010) of NCAA hockey.

In 2010, Brookwell joined the Gwinnett Gladiators of the ECHL, staying with the Gladiators for three seasons.

On June 21, 2013, the Belfast Giants of the British Elite Ice Hockey League signed Brookwell for the 2013-14 season.
