= Lassi Yrjölä =

Finnish ice hockey player

- Born: July 31, 1994 (age 30); Tampere, Finland
- Height: 6 ft 2 in (188 cm)
- Weight: 203 lb (92 kg; 14 st 7 lb)
- Position: Goaltender
- Catches: Left
- FFHG Div. 1 team Former teams: Corsaires de Dunkerque; Ilves
- NHL draft: Undrafted
- Playing career: 2014–present

Lassi Yrjölä (born July 31, 1994) is a Finnish ice hockey goaltender. He is currently playing with Corsaires de Dunkerque of the FFHG Division 1 in France.

Yrjölä made his Liiga debut playing with Ilves during the 2014–15 Liiga season where he played two games. He joined the Chicago Steel of the United States Hockey League (USHL) on 31 December 2014, but returned to Europe for the following season.
