= IK Comet =

Norwegian ice hockey club in Halden

Comet Halden
- City: Halden, Norway
- League: EliteHockey Ligaen
- Founded: 1961; 65 years ago
- Home arena: Halden Ishall
- Colors: Green, black, yellow and white
- Head coach: Lasse Fjeldstad
- Captain: Herman Kopperud
- Website: https://comethockey.no/

Ishockeyklubben Comet Halden, commonly known as IK Comet, is an ice hockey club based in Halden, Norway. They currently play in the EliteHockey Ligaen. They play their home games in Halden Ishall. Their team colours are green, black and white.

== History ==
Ishockeyklubben Comet was founded in 1961. Without a rink of their own, and struggling in the shadow of local greats Sparta Sarpsborg and Stjernen the club found it hard to get a breakthrough. In 1988 they got their own arena, Halden Ishall, and settled in the second highest league for most of the nineties.

In 1997 however an economical crisis forced the club to withdraw, and start again in the third division. Helped on by Swedish businessman Siwert Hjalmarsson the club again found its feet, and started to climb in the standings. In the spring of 2004 Comet had their greatest day so far, when, after beating Hasle/Løren in the final qualifying game, secured promotion to the top league.

The problems surrounding their arena however put dark clouds on the horizon. With its 1200 capacity and limited facilities Halden Ishall is not of GET-ligaen standards.

In 2008 I.K. Comet reached the semi-finals for the first time after upsetting derby rivals Sparta in seven games of the quarter-finals. (4-2 in games)

In October 2009, the club went bankrupt after a long period of financial troubles. The club restarted on the second tier in 2010.

== Current roster ==
Updated 1 January 2025.

No.	Nat	Player	Pos	S/G	Age	Acquired	Birthplace
79	(Sweden)	Elias Antonsen	LW	L	25	2022	Lørenskog, Norway
34	(Norway)	Gabriel Bjørnson	F	L	30	2021	Sarpsborg, Norway
50	(Sweden)	Ian Blomquist	G	R	23	2024	Gothenburg, Sweden
13	(Norway)	Jesper Løken Bugten	D	L	23	2021	Sarpsborg, Norway
11	(Sweden)	Douglas Byrkjeland	C	R	25	2024	Örebro, Sweden
18	(Lithuania)	Ugnius Čižas	C	L	30	2024	Elektrėnai, Lithuania
28	(Norway)	Erik André Erkleiv	D	R	21	2024	Furuset, Norway
8	(Lithuania)	Paulius Gintautas	RW	R		2024	Vilnius, Lithuania
24	(Sweden)	Sebastian Hansson	RW	R	33	2023	Skurup, Sweden
5	(Norway)	Niclas Jessesen	D	R	27	2023	Sarpsborg, Norway
6	(Norway)	Eirik Hafstad Johansen	D	L	25	2023	Sarpsborg, Norway
16	(Norway)	Herman Kopperud (C)	LW	L	30	2019	Fredrikstad, Norway
64	(Norway)	William Steinsvik Kuisma	F	L	24	2023	Stavanger, Norway
43	(Sweden)	Andreas Laschitza	LW	R	24	2024	Strömstad, Sweden
10	(Norway)	Erik Strand Mostad	LW	L	22	2023	Fredrikstad, Norway
26	(Norway)	Casper Einvik Myklebust	F	R	21	2022	Furuset, Norway
46	(Sweden)	David Nilsson (A)	D	L	26	2022	Kristianstad, Sweden
35	(Norway)	Martin Sjøvold Rambøl	G	L	22	2024	Fredrikstad, Norway
57	(Norway)	Sander Rekstad	C	L	27	2019	Fredrikstad, Norway
47	(Norway)	Tobias Skaarberg (A)	D	R	35	2020	Sarpsborg, Norway
44	(Sweden)	Simon Svensson	D	L	25	2024	Växjö, Sweden
21	(Norway)	Daniel Trnavský	F	L	32	2021	České Budějovice, Czech Republic
30	(Norway)	Trym Nilsen Watterud	G	L	25	2023	Lørenskog, Norway

== Season-by-season results ==
This is a partial list of the last five seasons completed by Comet. For the full season-by-season history, see List of IK Comet seasons.

Norwegian Champions	Regular Season Champions	Promoted	Relegated

Season	League	Regular season									Postseason
Season	League	GP	W	L	OTW	OTL	GF	GA	Pts	Finish	Postseason
2019–20	1. divisjon	40	29	7	2	2	217	100	93	3rd	Qualifying Abandoned
2020-21	1. divisjon	24	13	7	2	2	105	82	45	3rd	Season Abandoned
2021-22	1. divisjon	30	17	9	3	1	137	114	58	3rd	4th in Qualifying to Fjordkraft Ligaen
2022-23	1. divisjon	35	18	14	2	1	131	118	59	4th	3rd in Qualifying and Promoted to EliteHockey Ligaen
2023-24	EliteHockey Ligaen	45	3	40	2	0	80	251	13	10th	Survived Relegation
