= Varner Arena =

Norwegian ice hockey arena

- Risenga Ishall
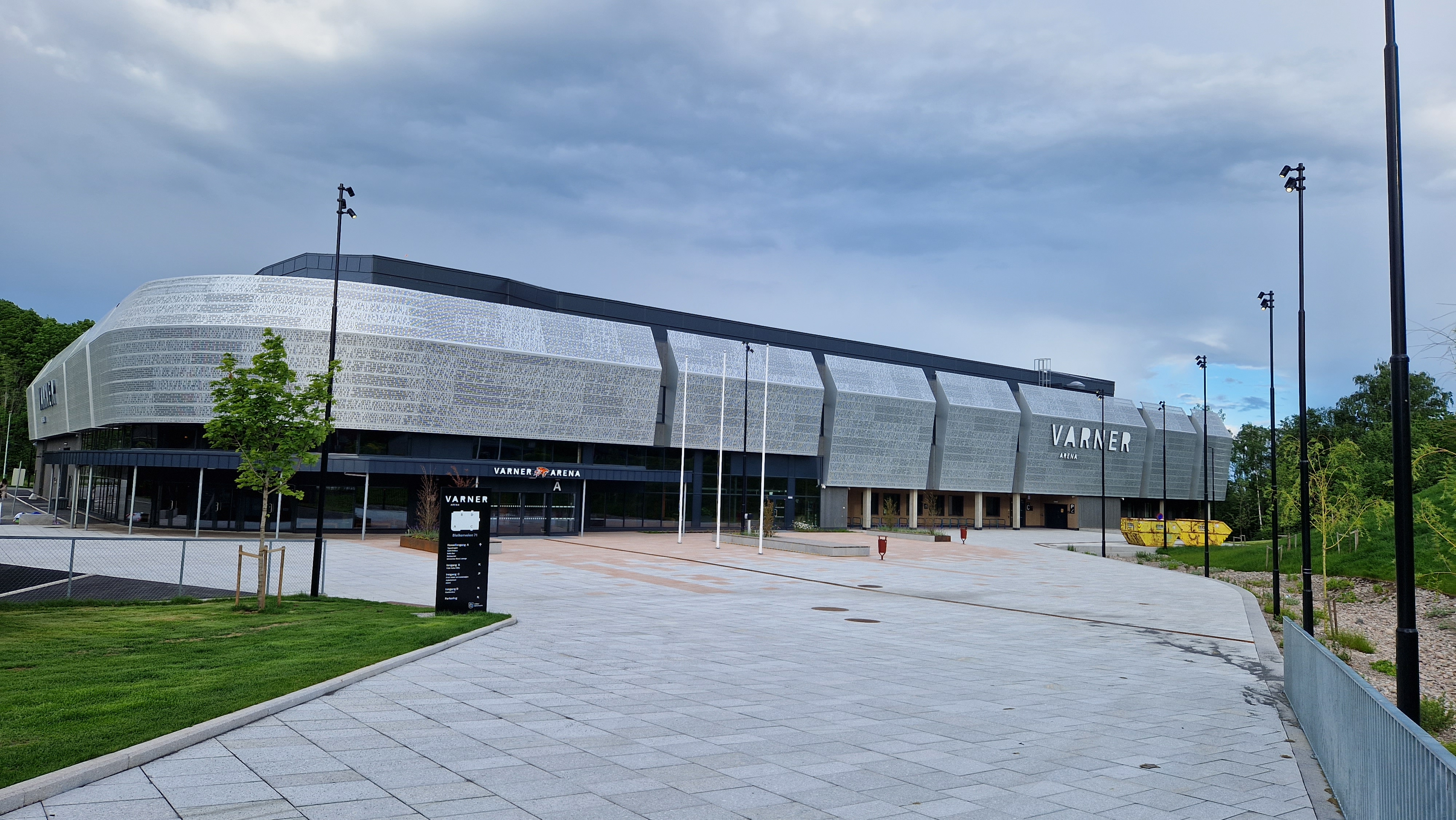
- Interactive map of Varner Arena
- Location: Asker, Akershus, Norway
- Coordinates: 59°49′32″N 10°26′48″E
- Owner: Asker Municipality
- Capacity: 3,800
- Executive suites: 20
- Surface: Artificial ice

Construction
- Groundbreaking: September 3, 2019
- Opened: February 19, 2022
- Cost: NOK 475 million
- Architect: JOB Arkitekter
- Main contractor: Backe Stor-Oslo

Tenant
- Frisk Asker Ishockey (2021-)

The Varner Arena (formerly Risenga Ishall) is an indoor ice hockey arena, located in Asker, Norway. The 3,800-spectator arena serves as the home of EliteHockey Ligaen side Frisk Asker Ishockey.

Construction on the new arena started on September 3, 2019, and the Varner Arena had its official opening on 19 February 2022 against Stavanger Oilers, Frisk Asker also won 3-2 after overtime. The construction of the ice rink started in the autumn of 2019. Varner Arena has a spectator capacity of 3800 spectators, approximately divided into 3150 seats, 500 standing places and 150 restaurant guests. The track width is 26 meters, which is an «NHL goal». The Varner Arena has a parking basement with space for about 200 cars.

Frisk Asker Ice Hockey has entered into an agreement with the fashion group Varner-Gruppen in 2022, which means that the club's new arena will be called Varner Arena. The agreement has a framework of 10 years.
