= Halden Ishall =

Ice hockey arena in Halden, Norway

Coordinates: 59.137°N 11.4084°E

Halden Ishall is an indoor ice hockey arena located in Halden, Norway. It was built in 1988 with an original capacity of 1,200.

It is the home arena of Comet ice hockey team.

Halden Ishall is the smallest of the ten arenas to host GET-ligaen matches, at the end of the 2007–08 season it was expanded to 2,200 seat capacity.
