= Viking Hockey =

Norwegian ice hockey team

Viking Hockey is an ice hockey team based in Stavanger, Norway. The club was founded in 1998, replacing Viking IK, which had folded in 1996. They played one season in the GET-ligaen, 1998–99. The team colors are blue and they play home matches in Siddishallen.

== Notable players ==
- Rob Schistad
- Kyle McDonough, inspiration for the title character in Happy Gilmore.
- Tore Vikingstad

== See also ==
- Stavanger Oilers
