= Christian Kåsastul =

Norwegian ice hockey player (born 1997)

- Born: 9 April 1997 (age 29) Skien, Norway
- Height: 5 ft 10 in (178 cm)
- Weight: 198 lb (90 kg; 14 st 2 lb)
- Position: Defence
- Shoots: Left
- Liiga team Former teams: HIFK; Frisk Asker; HC Vita Hästen; AIK IF; Ontario Reign
- National team: Norway
- NHL draft: Undrafted
- Playing career: 2014–present

Christian Kåsastul (born 9 April 1997) is a Norwegian professional ice hockey player who is a defenceman for HIFK Hockey of the Liiga.

== Playing career ==
Kåsastul played as a youth in his homeland with Frisk Asker Ishockey of the then GET-ligaen. He has also played in the Swedish HockeyAllsvenskan with HC Vita Hästen and AIK IF.

Following the 2020–21 season with AIK IF, Kåsastul opted to pursue a career in North America, agreeing to a contract with the Greenville Swamp Rabbits of the ECHL on 23 August 2021.

Returning for a second season with the Swamp Rabbits, Kåsastul made 7 appearances to start the 2022–23 season, before opting to return to his original Norwegian club, Frisk Asker, on 22 November 2022. He made just 3 further appearances with Frisk before securing a contract with top flight Finnish club, HIFK of the Liiga, on 4 December 2022.

== International play ==
Medal record

Men's ice hockey

Representing Norway

World Championships
Bronze medal – third place	2026 Switzerland	

He represented Norway national team at the 2019 IIHF World Championship.

== Career statistics ==
=== Regular season and playoffs ===
			Regular season					Playoffs
Season	Team	League	GP	G	A	Pts	PIM	GP	G	A	Pts	PIM
2014–15	Frisk Asker	GET	33	0	4	4	48	6	0	0	0	8
2015–16	Frisk Asker	GET	41	2	5	7	46	6	1	1	2	16
2016–17	Frisk Asker	GET	43	0	6	6	72	17	2	3	5	16
2017–18	HC Vita Hästen	Allsv	33	0	6	6	32	—	—	—	—	—
2017–18	Frisk Asker	GET	2	0	0	0	2	3	0	0	0	2
2018–19	Frisk Asker	GET	46	3	2	5	114	19	2	4	6	55
2019–20	Frisk Asker	GET	42	3	9	12	110	—	—	—	—	—
2020–21	AIK IF	Allsv	49	2	4	6	36	6	0	0	0	0
2021–22	Greenville Swamp Rabbits	ECHL	13	0	4	4	10	4	1	1	2	4
2021–22	Ontario Reign	AHL	25	1	7	8	12	—	—	—	—	—
2022–23	Greenville Swamp Rabbits	ECHL	7	0	1	1	2	—	—	—	—	—
2022–23	Frisk Asker	Norway	3	0	1	1	2	—	—	—	—	—
NOR totals			292	10	37	47	426	57	5	8	13	97
