= Max Krogdahl =

Norwegian ice hockey player (born 1998)

- Born: 21 October 1998 (age 27) Bærum, Norway
- Height: 1.87 m (6 ft 2 in)
- Weight: 95 kg (209 lb; 14 st 13 lb)
- Position: Defence
- Shoots: Right
- SHL team Former teams: Skellefteå AIK; Frisk Asker; Coventry Blaze
- National team: Norway
- NHL draft: Undrafted
- Playing career: 2016–present

Max Krogdahl (born 21 October 1998) is a Norwegian professional ice hockey player who is a defenceman for Skellefteå AIK of the Swedish Hockey League (SHL).

Krogdahl played five seasons in the HockeyAllsvenskan before securing a one-year SHL contract with Skellefteå AIK for the 2025–26 season on 3 July 2025.

He represented Norway national team at the 2021 IIHF World Championship.

Medal record

Men's ice hockey

Representing Norway

World Championships
Bronze medal – third place	2026 Switzerland	

== Career statistics ==
=== Regular season and playoffs ===
			Regular season					Playoffs
Season	Team	League	GP	G	A	Pts	PIM	GP	G	A	Pts	PIM
2016–17	Frisk Asker	GET	32	0	1	1	14	3	0	0	0	0
2017–18	Frisk Asker	GET	34	1	0	1	16	7	0	0	0	0
2018–19	Frisk Asker	GET	32	1	7	8	6	18	0	0	0	0
2019–20	Frisk Asker	GET	45	1	5	6	52	–	–	–	–	–
2020–21	Frisk Asker	NOR	23	2	2	4	14	–	–	–	–	–
2020–21	Coventry Blaze	EIHL	14	0	4	4	38	–	–	–	–	–
2021–22	Västerviks IK	Allsv	49	1	14	15	67	7	0	0	0	6
2022–23	Västerviks IK	Allsv	46	0	3	3	63	6	0	4	4	4
2023–24	Östersunds IK	Allsv	46	3	11	14	38	6	0	4	4	2
2024–25	IK Oskarshamn	Allsv	2	0	0	0	2	–	–	–	–	–
2024–25	Djurgårdens IF	Allsv	38	0	2	2	37	13	1	0	1	1
NOR totals			169	5	15	20	102	28	0	0	0	0
EIHL totals			14	0	4	4	38	–	–	–	–	–

=== International ===
Year	Team	Event	Result	GP	G	A	Pts	PIM
2015	Norway	U18 (Div IA)	4th	5	1	0	1	4
2016	Norway	U18 (Div IA)	5th	5	0	0	0	4
2018	Norway	U20 (Div IB)	1st place, gold medalist(s)	5	0	0	0	0
2021	Norway	WC	13th	7	0	1	1	4
2021	Norway	OGQ	DNQ	3	0	0	0	0
2022	Norway	WC	13th	7	1	0	1	2
2023	Norway	WC	13th	7	0	0	0	6
2024	Norway	WC	11th	7	1	1	2	8
2024	Norway	OGQ	DNQ	3	0	1	1	0
2025	Norway	WC	12th	7	0	0	0	8
2026	Norway	WC	3rd place, bronze medalist(s)	10	0	3	3	10
Junior totals				15	1	0	1	8
Senior totals				51	2	6	8	38
