= Kristian Forsberg =

Norwegian ice hockey player (born 1986)

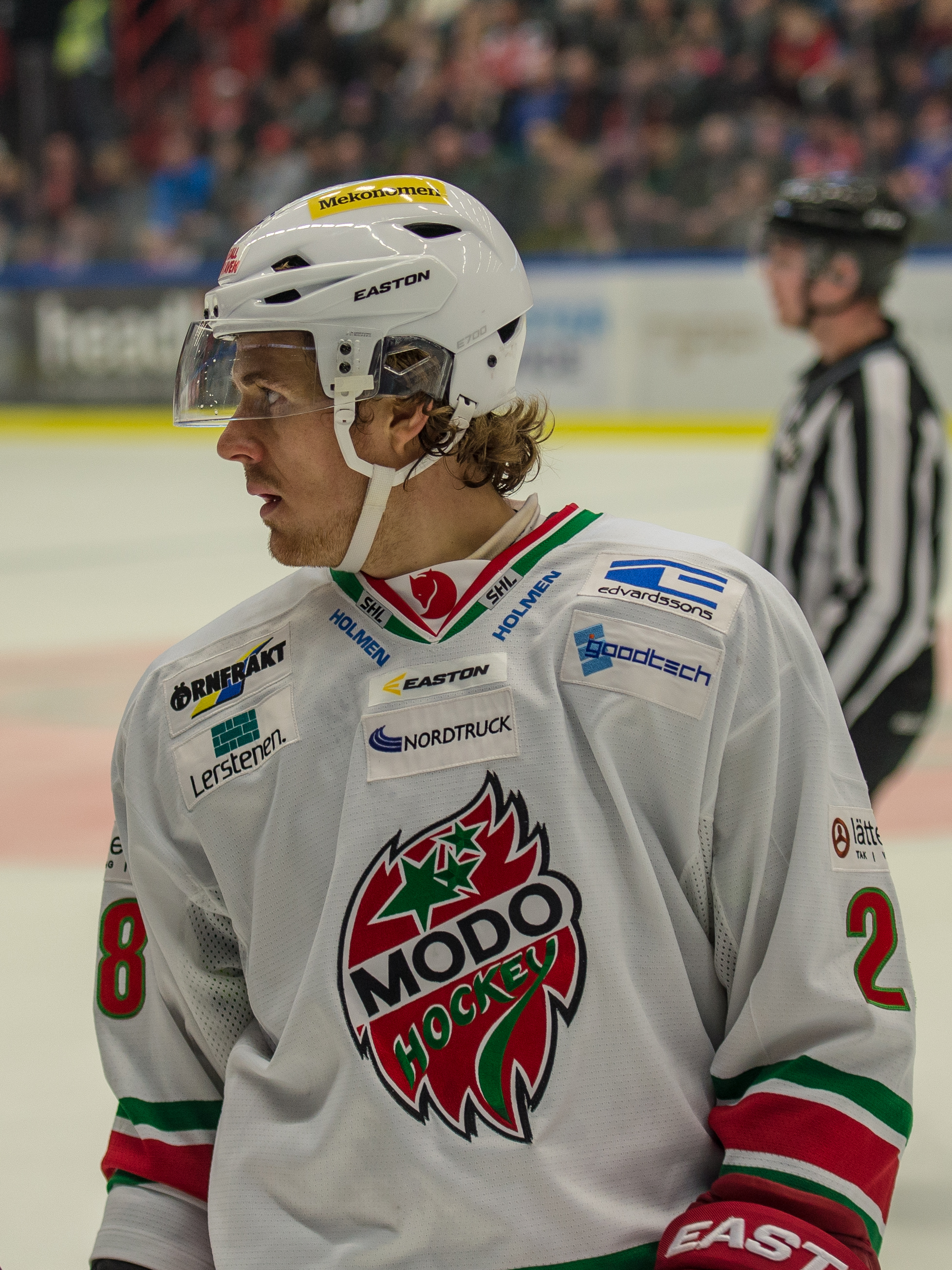
- Born: May 5, 1986 (age 38); Oslo, Norway
- Height: 6 ft 1 in (185 cm)
- Weight: 203 lb (92 kg; 14 st 7 lb)
- Position: Centre
- Shot: Right
- GET team Former teams: Stavanger Oilers; Furuset; Storhamar Dragons; Modo Hockey
- National team: Norway
- Playing career: 2003–2020

Kristian Forsberg (born May 5, 1986) is a Norwegian professional ice hockey player, currently playing for Stavanger Oilers of the Norwegian GET-league.

== Playing career ==
He started his hockey career with Furuset. But first played in the Norwegian GET-ligaen for Storhamar Dragons from 2005 to 2009, before moving on to Modo in the SHL. After five seasons with Modo in the SHL, Forsberg opted to return to his native Norway, signing with the Stavanger Oilers on June 4, 2014.

== International ==
He's also featured on Team Norway and has participated in the IIHF World Championship.

On January 7, 2014, Forsberg was named to Team Norway's official 2014 Winter Olympics roster.

He was named to the Norway men's national ice hockey team for competition at the 2014 IIHF World Championship.

== Career statistics ==
=== Regular season and playoffs ===
			Regular season					Playoffs
Season	Team	League	GP	G	A	Pts	PIM	GP	G	A	Pts	PIM
2003–04	Furuset Ishockey	NOR U19	17	8	6	14	24	—	—	—	—	—
2003–04	Furuset Ishockey	NOR.2	35	7	8	15	34	—	—	—	—	—
2004–05	Furuset Ishockey	NOR.2	29	18	12	30	28	—	—	—	—	—
2005–06	Storhamar Dragons	NOR	41	6	3	9	6	10	2	0	2	6
2006–07	Storhamar Dragons	NOR	44	10	11	21	22	17	4	4	8	0
2007–08	Storhamar Dragons	NOR	44	9	14	23	52	16	0	5	5	26
2008–09	Storhamar Dragons	NOR	45	6	11	17	24	10	1	0	1	12
2009–10	Modo Hockey	SEL	55	2	2	4	14	—	—	—	—	—
2010–11	Modo Hockey	SEL	49	4	5	9	20	—	—	—	—	—
2011–12	Modo Hockey	SEL	55	4	5	9	14	6	0	0	0	2
2012–13	Modo Hockey	SEL	53	4	7	11	22	5	0	0	0	2
2013–14	Modo Hockey	SHL	48	6	3	9	20	2	0	1	1	0
2014–15	Stavanger Oilers	NOR	45	12	22	34	22	15	4	7	11	4
2015–16	Stavanger Oilers	NOR	37	7	11	18	45	17	2	3	5	22
2016–17	Stavanger Oilers	NOR	43	7	12	19	26	14	2	2	4	8
2017–18	Stavanger Oilers	NOR	40	9	8	17	40	5	1	1	2	8
2018–19	Stavanger Oilers	NOR	48	11	15	26	30	9	0	0	0	2
2019–20	Stavanger Oilers	NOR	37	7	7	14	22	—	—	—	—	—
NOR totals			424	84	114	198	289	113	16	22	38	88
SEL/SHL totals			260	20	22	42	90	13	0	1	1	4

=== International ===
Year	Team	Event	GP	G	A	Pts	PIM
2004	Norway	WJC18	6	0	1	1	2
2005	Norway	WJC D1	5	2	1	3	31
2006	Norway	WJC	6	1	1	2	18
2007	Norway	WC	6	0	0	0	0
2008	Norway	WC	7	0	0	0	0
2009	Norway	OGQ	3	0	0	0	0
2009	Norway	WC	6	0	0	0	4
2010	Norway	OG	4	0	0	0	0
2010	Norway	WC	6	0	1	1	0
2011	Norway	WC	7	1	0	1	2
2012	Norway	WC	6	0	0	0	2
2013	Norway	WC	7	0	2	2	2
2014	Norway	OG	4	0	0	0	2
2014	Norway	WC	7	0	0	0	2
2015	Norway	WC	7	0	0	0	2
2016	Norway	WC	7	0	2	2	0
2016	Norway	OGQ	3	0	0	0	0
2017	Norway	WC	7	1	0	1	6
2018	Norway	OG	5	0	0	0	4
2018	Norway	WC	7	1	0	1	0
2019	Norway	WC	7	0	0	0	4
Junior totals			17	3	3	6	51
Senior totals			106	3	5	8	30
