= Christian Larrivée =

Canadian professional ice hockey player (born 1982)

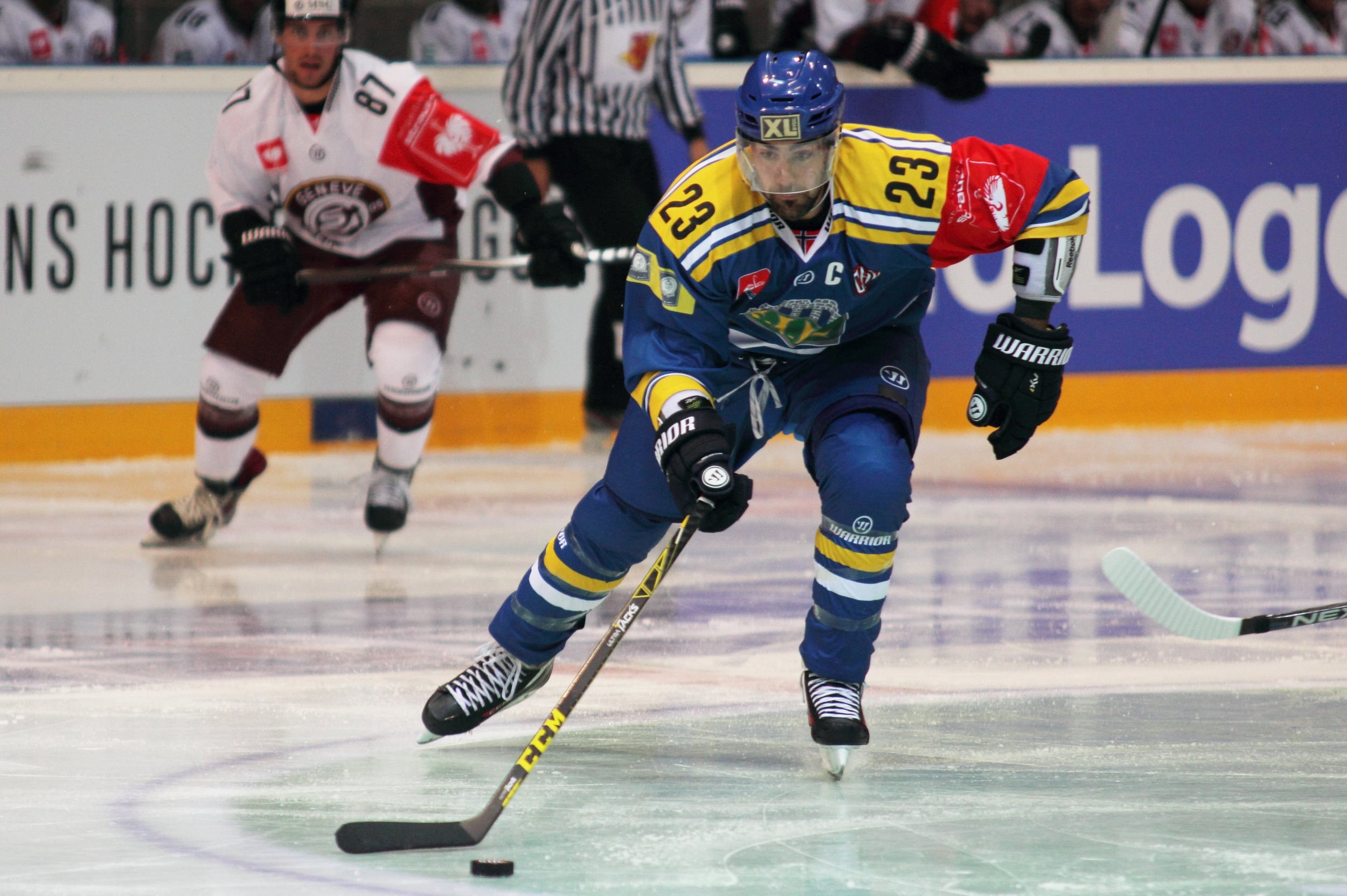
- Born: August 25, 1982 (age 43) Gaspé, Quebec, Canada
- Height: 6 ft 3 in (191 cm)
- Weight: 200 lb (91 kg; 14 st 4 lb)
- Position: Centre
- Shot: Left
- Played for: Storhamar Dragons; Västerås; Rødovre Mighty Bulls; Hamilton Bulldogs; Long Beach Ice Dogs
- NHL draft: 114th overall, 2000; Montreal Canadiens
- Playing career: 2003–2021

Christian Larrivée (born August 25, 1982) is a Canadian professional ice hockey player. He played in the North American minor leagues until 2006, when he moved to Europe.

Born in Gaspé, Quebec, Quebec, Canada, Larrivée played junior hockey for the Chicoutimi Saguenéens from 1999 to 2003. He was drafted by the Montreal Canadiens in the fourth round (114th overall) in the 2000 NHL entry draft. In 2003, he was signed by Canadiens and played for the Canadiens' top affiliate the Hamilton Bulldogs of the AHL and the Columbus Cottonmouths of the ECHL. He played the following season with the Long Beach Ice Dogs of the ECHL and nine games with Hamilton. In 2005–06, he played the entire season with Long Beach.

In 2006, he moved to Europe and played for Storhamar Dragons in the GET-ligaen in Norway during the 2006–07 season. There, he was named Most Valuable Player in the playoffs. He scored a record 32 points in 17 playoff games. The two following seasons he spent with Rødovre Mighty Bulls in Denmark.

In 2009–10 he played for the HockeyAllsvenskan team Västerås IK or V.I.K. He signed a two-year contract with the Storhamar Dragons in July 2010. After finishing the contract he signed a four-year extension to stay with Storhamar.

He was named the most valuable player again in the 2014–15 playoffs, when Storhamar lost 4–3 in matches to Stavanger Oilers. On April 11, 2019, Larrivée became the player with the most play-off goals in Storhamar history, netting his 49th in a 5–1 win against Frisk Asker in the 4th game of the 2018–19 finals.

He is a cult player for Storhamar, earning the nickname "Talismanen", the Talisman.

== Career statistics ==
			Regular season					Playoffs
Season	Team	League	GP	G	A	Pts	PIM	GP	G	A	Pts	PIM
1998–99	Jonquière Élites	QMAAA	42	26	36	62	10	—	—	—	—	—
1999–2000	Chicoutimi Saguenéens	QMJHL	69	8	15	23	18	—	—	—	—	—
2000–01	Chicoutimi Saguenéens	QMJHL	72	32	48	80	46	7	3	1	4	4
2001–02	Chicoutimi Saguenéens	QMJHL	72	48	52	100	60	4	2	5	7	0
2002–03	Chicoutimi Saguenéens	QMJHL	50	18	40	58	49	—	—	—	—	—
2003–04	Hamilton Bulldogs	AHL	2	1	1	2	0	6	0	0	0	2
2003–04	Columbus Cottonmouths	ECHL	72	11	22	33	28	—	—	—	—	—
2004–05	Hamilton Bulldogs	AHL	9	1	0	1	2	—	—	—	—	—
2004–05	Long Beach Ice Dogs	ECHL	53	9	20	29	18	7	1	6	7	8
2005–06	Long Beach Ice Dogs	ECHL	67	23	40	63	76	7	2	7	9	8
2006–07	Storhamar Dragons	NOR	36	14	32	46	12	17	13	19	32	37
2007–08	Rødovre Mighty Bulls	DEN	37	19	34	53	24	7	5	3	8	4
2008–09	Rødovre Mighty Bulls	DEN	43	18	23	41	22	12	7	9	16	10
2009–10	VIK Västerås HK	Allsv	42	8	25	33	20	—	—	—	—	—
2010–11	Storhamar Dragons	NOR	42	15	30	45	32	5	3	6	9	4
2011–12	Storhamar Dragons	NOR	23	18	31	49	50	7	3	5	8	4
2012–13	Storhamar Dragons	NOR	34	13	20	33	16	6	3	5	8	8
2013–14	Storhamar Dragons	NOR	39	11	31	42	20	12	5	4	9	20
2014–15	Storhamar Dragons	NOR	42	25	45	70	40	16	10	13	23	10
2015–16	Storhamar Dragons	NOR	32	12	23	35	35	13	3	5	8	8
2016–17	Storhamar Dragons	NOR	14	9	6	15	8	3	0	1	1	2
2017–18	Storhamar Dragons	NOR	44	17	29	46	20	14	5	7	12	2
2018–19	Storhamar Dragons	NOR	41	5	13	18	24	16	7	5	12	8
2019–20	Storhamar Dragons	NOR	22	3	5	8	63	—	—	—	—	—
2020–21	Storhamar Dragons	NOR	22	4	5	9	10	—	—	—	—	—
ECHL totals			192	43	82	125	122	14	3	13	16	16
NOR totals			394	146	270	416	330	109	52	70	122	103
