= Stefan Espeland =

Norwegian ice hockey player (born 1989)

- Born: 24 March 1989 (age 36); Oslo, Norway
- Height: 6 ft 0 in (183 cm)
- Weight: 185 lb (84 kg; 13 st 3 lb)
- Position: Defence
- Shoots: Left
- team Former teams: Storhamar Hockey; Modo Hockey; Vålerenga; Borås HC; IF Sundsvall; Lørenskog IK; Ilves; EC KAC; Fischtown Pinguins; Eisbären Berlin; EC Red Bull Salzburg
- National team: Norway
- Playing career: 2007–present

Stefan Espeland (born 24 March 1989) is a Norwegian professional ice hockey defenceman. He is currently playing for Storhamar Hockey He previously played for Eisbären Berlin of the Deutsche Eishockey Liga (DEL), Vålerenga Hockey of the Norwegian Eliteserien.

He joined Berlin after a one-year tenure with fellow German club, the Fischtown Pinguins in the 2019–20 season. He formerly played with Vålerenga of the GET-ligaen.

== International play ==
He was named to the Norway men's national ice hockey team for competition at the 2014 IIHF World Championship.

== Career statistics ==
=== Regular season and playoffs ===
			Regular season					Playoffs
Season	Team	League	GP	G	A	Pts	PIM	GP	G	A	Pts	PIM
2005–06	Linköpings HC	J18	27	5	10	15	26	—	—	—	—	—
2005–06	Linköpings HC	J20	1	0	1	1	0	4	0	0	0	0
2006–07	Linköpings HC	J18 Allsv	14	1	3	4	43	—	—	—	—	—
2006–07	Linköpings HC	J20	8	0	1	1	4	—	—	—	—	—
2007–08	Modo Hockey	J20	37	13	11	24	30	5	1	3	4	18
2007–08	Modo Hockey	SEL	2	0	0	0	0	—	—	—	—	—
2008–09	Modo Hockey	J20	38	8	23	31	36	5	3	0	3	2
2008–09	Modo Hockey	SEL	15	0	0	0	2	—	—	—	—	—
2009–10	Modo Hockey	J20	2	0	0	0	0	—	—	—	—	—
2009–10	Vålerenga Ishockey	NOR	42	1	6	7	40	16	2	7	9	0
2010–11	IF Sundsvall Hockey	Allsv	49	6	14	20	28	—	—	—	—	—
2011–12	Borås HC	Allsv	25	0	3	3	18	—	—	—	—	—
2011–12	Vålerenga Ishockey	NOR	15	0	8	8	10	12	1	0	1	8
2012–13	Vålerenga Ishockey	NOR	32	6	17	23	30	15	3	9	12	2
2013–14	Vålerenga Ishockey	NOR	44	5	31	36	22	17	3	2	5	10
2014–15	Vålerenga Ishockey	NOR	45	6	19	25	26	10	1	4	5	6
2015–16	Lørenskog IK	NOR	38	7	29	36	18	17	4	11	15	12
2016–17	Lørenskog IK	NOR	45	10	42	52	32	7	3	2	5	8
2017–18	Ilves	Liiga	19	2	2	4	10	—	—	—	—	—
2017–18	EC KAC	AUT	12	2	2	4	2	—	—	—	—	—
2017–18	Vålerenga Ishockey	NOR	3	0	0	0	0	5	1	3	4	6
2018–19	Vålerenga Ishockey	NOR	47	11	50	61	24	9	1	7	8	10
2019–20	Fischtown Penguins	DEL	51	9	29	38	20	—	—	—	—	—
2020–21	Eisbären Berlin	DEL	14	0	5	5	4	—	—	—	—	—
2020–21	EC Red Bull Salzburg	ICEHL	7	2	4	6	8	11	1	2	3	2
2021–22	Vålerenga Ishockey	NOR	34	7	28	35	20	5	0	4	4	4
NOR totals			345	53	230	283	222	113	19	49	68	66

=== International ===
Year	Team	Event	GP	G	A	Pts	PIM
2006	Norway	WJC18	6	0	0	0	8
2007	Norway	WJC18 D1	5	1	4	5	4
2008	Norway	WJC D1	5	2	3	5	2
2009	Norway	WJC D1	5	2	2	4	6
2014	Norway	WC	7	0	0	0	4
2015	Norway	WC	0	—	—	—	—
2016	Norway	OGQ	3	0	0	0	0
2018	Norway	OG	5	0	0	0	2
2018	Norway	WC	7	0	2	2	2
2019	Norway	WC	7	1	0	1	2
2021	Norway	WC	6	1	1	2	2
2021	Norway	OGQ	3	1	1	2	2
Junior totals			21	5	9	14	20
Senior totals			38	3	4	7	14
