= Erik de la Rose =

Swedish ice hockey player (born 1993)

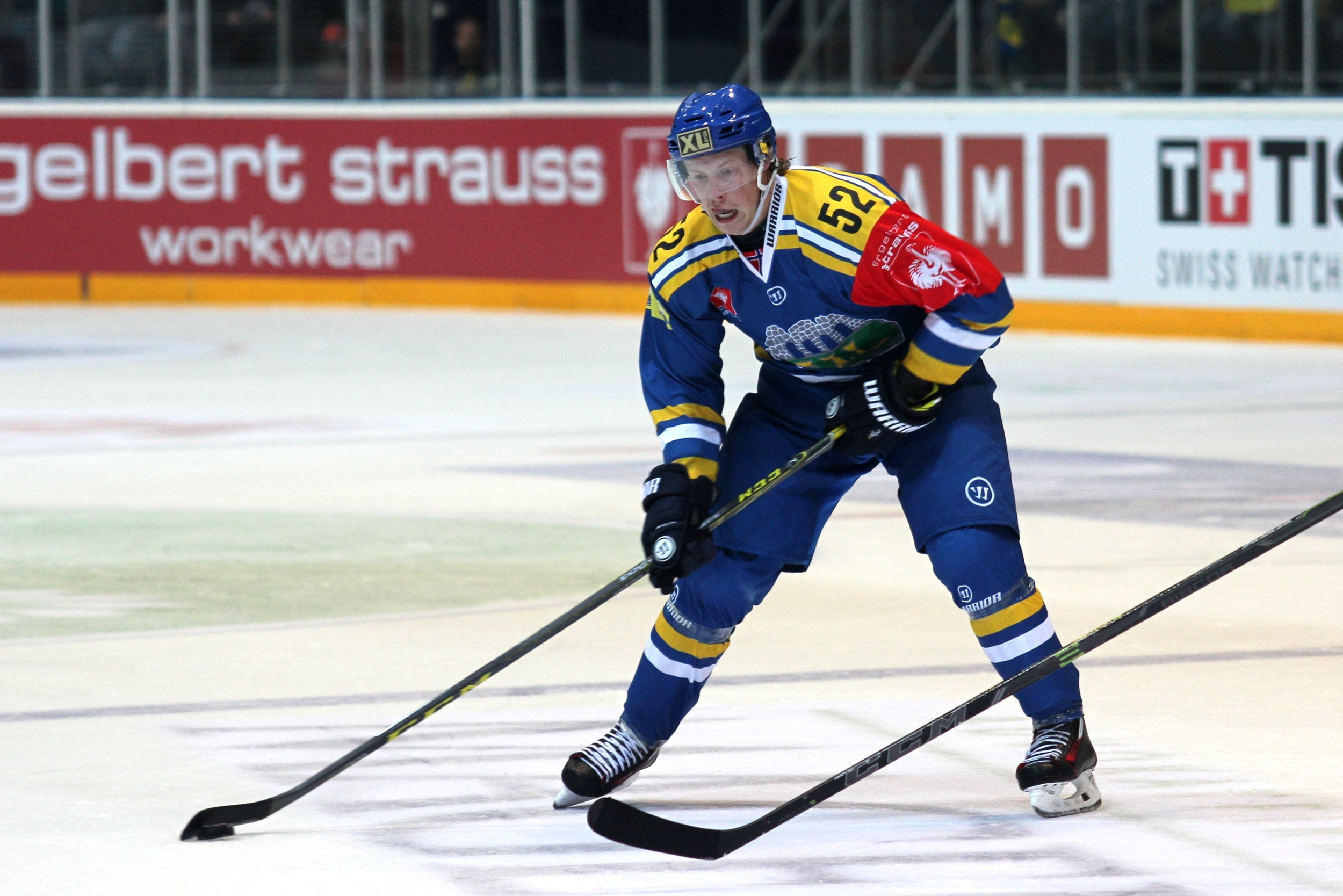
- Born: June 9, 1993 (age 33) Arvika, Sweden
- Height: 5 ft 11 in (180 cm)
- Weight: 165 lb (75 kg; 11 st 11 lb)
- Position: Defence
- Shot: Right
- GET-ligaen team Former teams: Storhamar; Almtuna IS; Lillehammer IK; Borlänge HF; Leksands IF
- NHL draft: Undrafted
- Playing career: 2009–2022

Erik de la Rose (born June 9, 1993) is a Swedish professional ice hockey defenceman, who plays for Vítkovice of the Czech ELH.

== Personal ==
Erik's brother, Jacob had a brief stint in the National Hockey League.

== Career statistics ==
			Regular season					Playoffs
Season	Team	League	GP	G	A	Pts	PIM	GP	G	A	Pts	PIM
2007–08	Nor IK J18	J18 Div. 1	—	—	—	—	—	—	—	—	—	—
2007–08	Nor IK J20	J20 Div. 1	—	—	—	—	—	—	—	—	—	—
2008–09	Nor IK U16	U16 SM	8	1	7	8	8	—	—	—	—	—
2008–09	Nor IK J18	J18 Div. 1	5	1	6	7	4	—	—	—	—	—
2008–09	Nor IK J20	J20 Elit	8	0	1	1	31	—	—	—	—	—
2008–09	Nor IK	Division 2	10	0	2	2	4	—	—	—	—	—
2009–10	Leksands IF J18	J18 Elit	19	3	10	13	10	—	—	—	—	—
2009–10	Leksands IF J18	J18 Allsvenskan	3	0	1	1	2	4	1	1	2	2
2009–10	Leksands IF J20	J20 SuperElit	7	0	2	2	2	5	0	0	0	0
2010–11	Leksands IF J18	J18 Elit	5	1	3	4	2	—	—	—	—	—
2010–11	Leksands IF J18	J18 Allsvenskan	9	2	3	5	0	6	0	5	5	2
2010–11	Leksands IF J20	J20 SuperElit	39	6	7	13	20	—	—	—	—	—
2010–11	Leksands IF	HockeyAllsvenskan	2	0	0	0	0	—	—	—	—	—
2011–12	Leksands IF J20	J20 SuperElit	26	7	12	19	20	—	—	—	—	—
2011–12	Leksands IF	HockeyAllsvenskan	24	0	3	3	2	6	0	1	1	0
2011–12	Borlänge HF	Division 1	5	0	5	5	6	—	—	—	—	—
2012–13	Leksands IF J20	J20 SuperElit	12	0	4	4	6	—	—	—	—	—
2012–13	Lillehammer IK	Norway	34	10	16	26	12	6	1	4	5	0
2013–14	Almtuna IS J20	J20 Elit	1	0	0	0	2	—	—	—	—	—
2013–14	Almtuna IS	HockeyAllsvenskan	50	2	4	6	18	—	—	—	—	—
2014–15	Storhamar Hockey	Norway	45	4	42	46	26	16	4	6	10	2
2015–16	Storhamar Hockey	Norway	41	6	14	20	14	13	3	10	13	0
2016–17	Storhamar Hockey	Norway	40	4	23	27	4	7	1	4	5	2
2017–18	HC Dukla Jihlava	Czech	48	4	10	14	6	—	—	—	—	—
2018–19	HC Vitkovice	Czech	12	1	1	2	2	—	—	—	—	—
2018–19	HC Sparta Praha	Czech	18	2	1	3	0	—	—	—	—	—
2019–20	Västerås IK	HockeyAllsvenskan	25	1	4	5	2	—	—	—	—	—
2020–21	Storhamar Hockey	Norway	22	2	3	5	6	—	—	—	—	—
2021–22	Storhamar Hockey	Norway	11	0	4	4	0	15	1	8	9	2
Czech totals			78	7	12	19	8	—	—	—	—	—
HockeyAllsvenskan totals			101	3	11	14	22	6	0	1	1	0
Norway totals			193	26	102	128	62	57	10	32	42	6
