= Rūdolfs Balcers =

Latvian ice hockey player (born 1997)

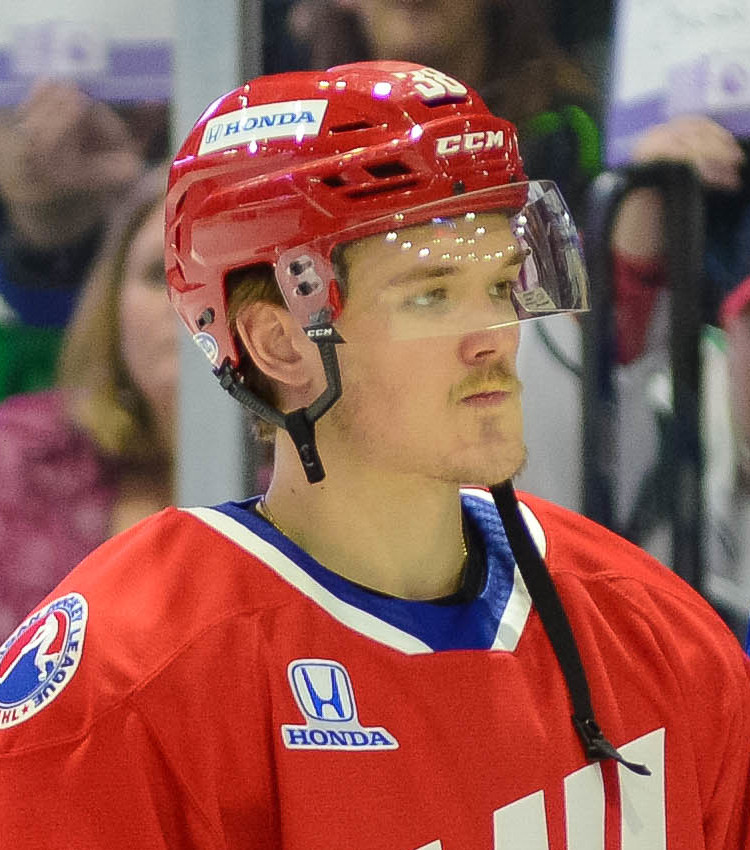
- Balcers at the 2018 AHL All-Star Game
- Born: 8 April 1997 (age 29) Liepāja, Latvia
- Height: 5 ft 11 in (180 cm)
- Weight: 180 lb (82 kg; 12 st 12 lb)
- Position: Forward
- Shoots: Left
- NL team Former teams: ZSC Lions; Stavanger Oilers; Ottawa Senators; San Jose Sharks; Florida Panthers; Tampa Bay Lightning
- National team: Latvia
- NHL draft: 142nd overall, 2015; San Jose Sharks
- Playing career: 2014–present

Rūdolfs Balcers (born 8 April 1997) is a Latvian professional ice hockey player who is a forward for the ZSC Lions of the National League (NL). He was selected by the San Jose Sharks, 142nd overall, in the 2015 NHL entry draft. Balcers played three seasons for the Stavanger Oilers before moving to North America in 2016, where he spent one season with the Kamloops Blazers of the Western Hockey League (WHL). After one season in the American Hockey League (AHL) with the Sharks minor league affiliate, the San Jose Barracuda, Balcers was traded to the Ottawa Senators in 2018, and made his NHL debut with the team in 2019. He rejoined the Sharks in 2021. Playing with the Latvian national team, Balcers played a central role in the country's first-ever medal at Ice Hockey World Championships in 2023.

== Playing career ==
As a junior, Balcers played in Norway with Lørenskog until joining the Stavanger Oilers in the 2013–14 season. The youngest player on the Oilers in 2014–15, he recorded 21 points in 38 regular season as the club won the league championship, and was selected by the San Jose Sharks in the fifth round, 142nd overall, at the 2015 NHL entry draft.

After three seasons with Stavanger Oilers he moved to continue his development in North America, joining major junior club the Kamloops Blazers of the Western Hockey League (WHL) for the 2016–17 season. Balcers made a seamless transition to the WHL appearing in 66 games with the Blazers, finishing with 40 goals, the most on the team.

Having experienced a successful season with Blazers, he was signed to a three-year, entry-level contract with his draft team, the San Jose Sharks, on 13 July 2017. After attending the Sharks 2017 training camp, he was assigned by the Sharks to begin his North American professional career with AHL affiliate, the San Jose Barracuda. In the 2017–18 season, Balcers led the Barracuda with 23 goals and 25 assists for 48 points in 67 games. He was selected to represent the Barracuda at the 2018 All-Star Classic.

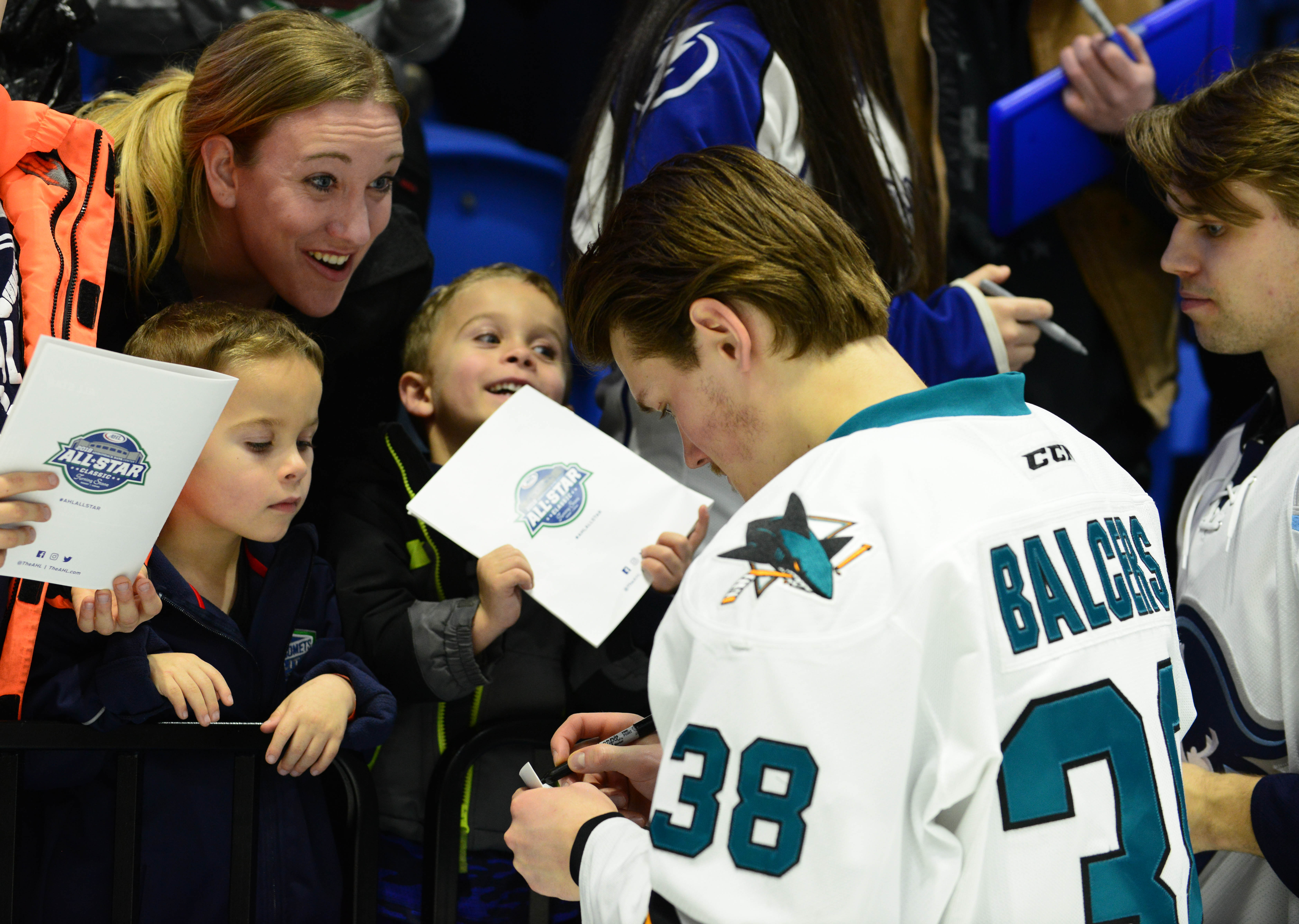
Balcers at the 2018 AHL All Star Classic

In September 2018, Balcers was traded by the Sharks to the Ottawa Senators as part of a package of players, prospects and draft picks for Erik Karlsson. Assigned to the Senators' AHL affiliate the Belleville Senators to start the season, Balcers was leading the team in goals and points when he was recalled by Ottawa in early January 2019. He made his NHL debut with the Senators on 5 January 2019, against the Minnesota Wild, and scored his first goal in the next game, on 6 January against the Carolina Hurricanes.

After missing most of the 2019–20 season with an MCL injury, Balcers signed a one-year, two-way contract with the Senators in October 2020. Shortly after that, he was loaned back to Stavanger until the start of the delayed 2020–21 season. Balcers compiled seven goals and eight assists in just 10 games in his return with the Stavanger Oilers before returning to the Senators organization.

Approaching the conclusion of training camp, Balcers was placed on waivers by the Senators and subsequently claimed by his original club, the San Jose Sharks, on 12 January 2021. He scored his first goal for the Sharks, in a 5–4 win over the St. Louis Blues on 20 February 2021. On 22 July 2021, Balcers signed a two-year, $3.1 million contract with the Sharks.

Following the 2021–22 season, despite having recorded career-best marks with 11 goals and 23 points through 61 regular season games, Balcers was placed on unconditional waivers by the Sharks in order to buyout the remaining season of his contract on 12 July 2022. On 14 July, Balcers as a free agent agreed to a one-year, $750,000 contract with the Florida Panthers. He made his Panthers debut on the opening night of the 2022–23 season, in a 3–1 victory over the New York Islanders on 13 October.

Despite contributing with two goals and two assists through 14 games with the Panthers, Balcers was placed on waivers due to other roster considerations on 11 November 2022. The following day on 12 November, Balcers was claimed off waivers by rival club, the Tampa Bay Lightning.

After five NHL seasons, Balcers left as a free agent and was signed to a one-year contract with Swiss club, ZSC Lions of the NL, on 4 July 2023.

== International play ==
Medal record

Representing Latvia

Ice hockey

World Championships
Bronze medal – third place	2023 Finland/Latvia	

After representing Latvia at the junior level, Balcers was selected by head coach Bob Hartley for the 2018 World Championship. In his senior debut game against Norway, he scored two goals including the overtime-winning goal. The four goals and six points he scored in eight games led the Latvian team.

He represented Latvia at the 2023 IIHF World Championship where he recorded two goals and seven assists and won a bronze medal, Latvia's first-ever IIHF World Championship medal.

== Career statistics ==
=== Regular season and playoffs ===
			Regular season					Playoffs
Season	Team	League	GP	G	A	Pts	PIM	GP	G	A	Pts	PIM
2012–13	Lørenskog IK	NOR U18	26	20	17	37	26	2	3	1	4	2
2012–13	Lørenskog IK	NOR U20	2	1	1	2	0	—	—	—	—	—
2013–14	Viking Hockey	NOR U18	22	35	23	58	20	3	3	2	5	0
2013–14	Viking Hockey	NOR.2	10	6	3	9	4	—	—	—	—	—
2013–14	Stavanger Oilers	NOR	2	0	1	1	0	—	—	—	—	—
2014–15	Stavanger Oilers	NOR U20	7	6	3	9	2	12	14	9	23	14
2014–15	Stavanger Oilers	NOR	36	8	13	21	8	—	—	—	—	—
2014–15	Stavanger Oilers	NOR U18	—	—	—	—	—	1	0	0	0	0
2015–16	Stavanger Oilers	NOR U20	2	0	1	1	0	—	—	—	—	—
2015–16	Stavanger Oilers	NOR	43	15	9	24	16	17	6	4	10	4
2016–17	Kamloops Blazers	WHL	66	40	37	77	16	6	2	1	3	0
2017–18	San Jose Barracuda	AHL	67	23	25	48	12	4	2	2	4	6
2018–19	Belleville Senators	AHL	43	17	14	31	4	—	—	—	—	—
2018–19	Ottawa Senators	NHL	36	5	9	14	10	—	—	—	—	—
2019–20	Belleville Senators	AHL	33	16	20	36	14	—	—	—	—	—
2019–20	Ottawa Senators	NHL	15	1	2	3	10	—	—	—	—	—
2020–21	Stavanger Oilers	NOR	10	7	8	15	18	—	—	—	—	—
2020–21	San Jose Sharks	NHL	41	8	9	17	16	—	—	—	—	—
2021–22	San Jose Sharks	NHL	61	11	12	23	20	—	—	—	—	—
2022–23	Florida Panthers	NHL	14	2	2	4	4	—	—	—	—	—
2022–23	Tampa Bay Lightning	NHL	3	1	0	1	0	—	—	—	—	—
2022–23	Syracuse Crunch	AHL	36	8	7	15	22	5	0	1	1	2
2023–24	ZSC Lions	NL	50	20	18	38	18	13	4	4	8	8
2024–25	ZSC Lions	NL	29	4	14	18	6	13	4	4	8	2
2025–26	ZSC Lions	NL	34	14	12	26	18	9	2	3	5	2
NHL totals			170	28	34	62	50	—	—	—	—	—

=== International ===
Year	Team	Event	Result	GP	G	A	Pts	PIM
2015	Latvia	WJC18	9th	6	2	4	6	2
2017	Latvia	WJC	10th	6	1	1	2	12
2018	Latvia	WC	8th	8	4	2	6	0
2019	Latvia	WC	10th	7	1	8	9	0
2021	Latvia	OGQ	Q	3	3	3	6	0
2022	Latvia	WC	10th	7	3	2	5	2
2023	Latvia	WC	3rd place, bronze medalist(s)	10	2	7	9	0
2024	Latvia	OGQ	Q	3	1	0	1	0
2025	Latvia	WC	10th	7	0	2	2	0
2026	Latvia	OG	10th	3	0	1	1	0
2026	Latvia	WC	6th	8	7	3	10	2
Junior totals				39	12	21	33	22
Senior totals				56	21	28	49	4

== Awards and honours ==
Award	Year	Ref
GET
Champions	2015, 2016	
AHL
All-Star Game	2018, 2020	
NL
Champion	2024, 2025	
