= List of Frisk Asker Ishockey seasons =

Frisk Asker Ishockey is a Norwegian ice hockey club based in Asker. They are members of the highest Norwegian ice hockey league, Eliteserien (known as GET-ligaen for sponsorship reasons). The Tigers are the ice hockey department of IF Frisk Asker, a sports club founded in 1922. In 1935, the club began playing ice hockey, joining the newly established Norwegian Ice Hockey Association as its twelfth member. The "Tigers" nickname is a recent addition, used in recognition of IK Tigrene with whom Frisk had merged in 1969. As of 2010, they have completed forty-three seasons in the Eliteserien and have won 684 regular season games and five league titles.

Having spent their early years in the second level B-serien, Frisk briefly played in the top flight, then known as 1. divisjon, for a few seasons following World War II. For the most part, however, their achievements remained modest until the construction of the indoor ice rink Askerhallen in 1969. This attracted the attention of Tigrene, an Oslo-based club who had a strong team but nowhere to play, and the two clubs agreed to a merger. Frisk thus gained entry into the highest division for the first time in twenty years and were one of the leading teams in Norway during the 1970s, winning the Norwegian Championship twice. The club's fortunes then began to fade until reaching a low point in 1994, when they spent one season playing in the second tier. The Tigers have since enjoyed another period of success, making three appearances in the Finals during the 2000s and adding a third Norwegian Championship title in 2002.

== Seasons ==
Norwegian Champions	Regular Season Champions	Promoted	Relegated

Season	League	Division	Regular season^{[a]}										Post season^{[a]}							
Season	League	Division	GP	W	L	T	OTW	OTL	GF	GA	Pts	Finish	GP	W	L	T	GF	GA	Pts	Result
1935–36	B-serien	West											1	0	1	—	1	3	—	Lost in Qualifying for Hovedserien, 1–3 (Furuset)
1936–37	B-serien		5				—	—			4	4th	Did not qualify							
1937–38	B-serien	Akershus					—	—				1st	1	0	1	—	?	?	—	Lost in B-serien Final (B.14)
1938–39	B-serien	Akershus					—	—												
1939–40	B-serien	Akershus					—	—					2	1	1	—	5	5	—	Won in First Round, 2–1 (B.14); Lost in Second Round, 3–4 (Ready)
1940–45	No games played due to World War II																			
1945–46	1. divisjon						—	—					?							
1946–47	1. divisjon		8	1	7	0	—	—	16	50	2	8th	Did not qualify							
1947–48	2. divisjon						—	—												
1948–49	1. divisjon		7	0	7	0	—	—	2	19	0	7th	Did not qualify							
1949–50							—	—												
1950–51							—	—												
1951–52							—	—												
1952–53							—	—												
1953–54							—	—												
1954–55							—	—												
1955–56^{[b]}							—	—												
1956–57							—	—												
1957–58							—	—												
1958–59							—	—												
1959–60	1. divisjon		14	7	6	1	—	—	45	46	15	4th								
1960–61	1. divisjon		15	8	6	1	—	—	65	47	17	7th								
1961–62	1. divisjon		14	1	12	1	—	—	19	69	3	8th								
1962–63	2. divisjon						—	—												
1963–64^{[c]}							—	—												
1964–65							—	—												
1965–66							—	—												
1966–67							—	—												
1967–68							—	—												
1968–69							—	—												
Frisk merged with Tigrene
1969–70	1. divisjon		21	15	3	3	—	—	92	40	33	2nd	?							
1970–71	1. divisjon		21	15	5	1	—	—	126	67	31	2nd	?							
1971–72	1. divisjon		14	7	6	1	—	—	52	52	15	4th	6	1	4	1	26	26	3	4th in Norwegian Championship
1972–73	1. divisjon		14	8	5	1	—	—	68	43	17	3rd	6	2	4	0	20	34	4	4th in Norwegian Championship
1973–74	1. divisjon		18	18	0	0	—	—	128	40	36	1st	10	7	2	1	66	29	15	Tied 1st in Norwegian Championship
1973–74	1. divisjon		18	18	0	0	—	—	128	40	36	1st	2	0	1	1	4	7	—	Tied in Final, 4–4 (Hasle/Løren); Lost in Replay, 0–3 (Hasle/Løren)
1974–75	1. divisjon		18	14	4	0	—	—	103	58	28	3rd	10	7	3	0	51	32	14	Won Norwegian Championship
1975–76	1. divisjon		18	14	3	1	—	—	114	54	29	1st	10	4	4	2	47	38	10	4th in Norwegian Championship
1976–77	1. divisjon		18	15	2	1	—	—	127	39	32	1st	10	6	4	0	60	32	12	3rd in Norwegian Championship
1977–78	1. divisjon		18	16	2	0	—	—	141	65	32	1st	10	5	5	0	40	31	10	3rd in Norwegian Championship
1978–79	1. divisjon		18	11	6	1	—	—	114	63	23	4th	10	9	0	1	67	27	19	Won Norwegian Championship
1979–80	1. divisjon		27	17	9	1	—	—	138	83	35	3rd	4	2	2	—	16	15	—	Lost in Semi-finals, 0–2 (Furuset); Won bronze medal series, 2–0 (Manglerud Star)
1980–81	1. divisjon		36	23	7	6	—	—	182	121	51	2nd	4	2	2	—	17	21	—	Lost in Semi-finals, 1–2 (Stjernen); Won bronze medal game, 8–7 (Furuset)
1981–82	1. divisjon		36	15	15	6	—	—	178	163	36	6th	Did not qualify							
1982–83	1. divisjon		36	20	13	3	—	—	175	130	43	5th	Did not qualify							
1983–84	1. divisjon		28	12	12	4	—	—	127	137	28	6th	Did not qualify							
1984–85	1. divisjon		18	9	8	1	—	—	97	68	19	7th	10	10	0	0	77	22	20	1st in Qualifying for 1. divisjon
1985–86	1. divisjon		36	21	12	3	—	—	229	141	45	3rd	6	2	4	—	22	21	—	Won in Semi-finals, 2–1 (Sparta Warriors); Lost in Finals, 0–3 (Stjernen)
1986–87	1. divisjon		36	20	15	1	—	—	181	57	36	4th	2	0	2	—	6	8	—	Lost in Semi-finals, 0–2 (Vålerenga)
1987–88	1. divisjon		36	20	14	2	—	—	174	134	42	4th	2	0	2	—	5	13	—	Lost in Semi-finals, 0–2 (Vålerenga)
1988–89	1. divisjon		36	15	18	3	—	—	165	171	33	6th	Did not qualify							
1989–90	1. divisjon		36	12	21	3	—	—	157	210	27	7th	Did not qualify							
1990–91^{[d]}	Eliteserien I		18	2	16	0	—	—	60	145	4	10th	Did not qualify							
1990–91^{[d]}	1. divisjon II		14	14	0	0	—	—	123	38	28	1st	Did not qualify							
1991–92	Eliteserien I		18	5	13	0	—	—	63	107	10	9th	Did not qualify							
1991–92	1. divisjon II^{[e]}		14	14	0	0	—	—	140	30	28	1st	Did not qualify							
1992–93	Eliteserien I		18	4	13	1	—	—	60	94	9	8th	Did not qualify							
1992–93	Eliteserien II		14	0	14	0	—	—	32	111	0	8th	Did not qualify							
1993–94	Eliteserien I		18	2	15	1	—	—	63	85	5	10th	Did not qualify							
1993–94	1. divisjon II		14	8	4	2	—	—	73	48	18	3rd	Did not qualify							
1994–95	1. divisjon		28	18	6	4	—	—	145	90	40	3rd	2	2	0	0	17	2	4	1st in Preliminary Qualifying for Eliteserien
1994–95	1. divisjon		28	18	6	4	—	—	145	90	40	3rd	6	0	5	1	16	29	1	4th in Qualifying for Eliteserien^{[f]}
1995–96	Eliteserien		28	5	22	1	—	—	69	154	11	7th	Did not qualify							
1996–97	Eliteserien		36	21	14	1	—	—	170	123	43	4th	6	3	3	—	17	31	—	Won in Quarter-finals, 3–0 (Lillehammer); Lost in Semi-finals, 0–3 (Vålerenga)
1997–98	Eliteserien		44	21	16	7	—	—	183	147	49	5th	Did not qualify							
1998–99	Eliteserien		44	20	21	3	—	—	171	145	43	5th	Did not qualify							
1999–2000	Eliteserien		38	27	11	0	—	—	172	109	54	3rd	3	0	3	—	9	22	—	Lost in Semi-finals, 0–3 (Vålerenga)
2000–01	Eliteserien		42	30	11	1	—	—	218	109	61	3rd	6	3	3	—	11	11	—	Won in Semi-finals, 3–0 (Storhamar); Lost in Finals, 0–3 (Vålerenga)
2001–02	Eliteserien		42	31	8	3	—	—	194	106	65	2nd	8	6	2	—	33	15	—	Bye to Semi-finals; Won in Semi-finals, 3–0 (Lillehammer); Won Norwegian Championship, 3–2 (Storhamar)
2002–03^{g}	Eliteserien		38	20	8	—	5	5	157	110	71	3rd	6	3	3	—	23	19	—	Won in Quarter-finals, 2–0 (Sparta); Lost in Semi-finals, 1–3 (Storhamar)
2003–04	Eliteserien		42	20	13	—	5	4	152	118	74	4th	5	2	3	—	22	16	—	Lost in Quarter-finals, 2–3 (Sparta)
2004–05	Eliteserien		42	20	12	—	10	0	143	137	74	4th	4	1	3	—	14	19	—	Lost in Quarter-finals, 1–3 (Stjernen)
2005–06	Eliteserien		42	16	17	—	7	2	139	151	50	7th	4	0	4	—	4	17	—	Lost in Quarter-finals, 0–4 (Storhamar)
2006–07	Eliteserien		44	19	15	—	8	2	157	169	74	4th	7	3	4	—	16	25	—	Lost in Quarter-finals, 3–4 (Sparta)
2007–08	Eliteserien		44	29	6	—	3	6	205	142	93	1st	16	10	6	—	60	33	—	Won in Quarter-finals, 4–1 (Furuset); Won in Semi-finals, 4–1 (Comet); Lost in Finals, 2–4 (Storhamar)
2008–09	Eliteserien		45	14	19	—	6	6	129	144	62	7th	5	1	4	—	8	20	—	Lost in Quarter-finals, 1–4 (Vålerenga)
2009–10	Eliteserien		48	12	28	—	4	4	121	181	51	9th	6	6	0	—	43	11	17	1st in Qualifying for Eliteserien
Eliteserien totals^{[h]}			1,259	636	486	60	48	29	5,544	4,483	1,576		164	80	78	6	669	567	87	28 playoff appearances

== Notes ==
- ^{a} Code explanation; GP—Games Played, W—Wins, L—Losses, T—Tied games, OTW—Overtime/Shootout wins, OTL—Overtime/Shootout losses, GF—Goals For, GA—Goals Against, Pts—Points
- ^{b} Before the 1955–56 season, the top division, 1. divisjon was renamed Hovedserien. Correspondingly, the 2. divisjon (second tier) was renamed 1. divisjon, the 3. divisjon (third tier) was renamed 2. divisjon etc.
- ^{c} Before the 1963–64 season, the top division, Hovedserien was renamed 1. divisjon. Correspondingly, the 1. divisjon (second tier) was renamed 2. divisjon, the 2. divisjon (third tier) was renamed 3. divisjon etc.
- ^{d} Before the 1990–91 season, the top division, 1. divisjon was renamed Eliteserien. Correspondingly, the 2. divisjon (second tier) was renamed 1. divisjon, the 3. divisjon (third tier) was renamed 2. divisjon etc.
- ^{e} Between the 1990–91 season and the 1993–94 season, the Eliteserien was divided into two parts. After the first 18 games, the top eight teams qualified for the second half of the Eliteserien. The bottom two teams were relegated to the 1. divisjon and would compete for the right to play in the Eliteserien in the following season. In 1990–91, the results of both rounds were added up to produce one league champion; in the three following seasons, there were two champions per season.
- ^{f} Frisk were promoted despite finishing fourth and last. Runners-up Sparta went bankrupt and withdrew from the league. Their place was offered to third placed Lørenskog, who declined, and then to Frisk, who accepted.
- ^{g} Beginning with the 2002–03 season, all games in the Eliteserien have a winner. In addition, teams now receive three points for a win in regulation time, two points for a win in overtime and one point for a loss in overtime.
- ^{h} Totals as of the completion of the 2009–10 season, except for 1945–46 season.
