= Michael Haga =

Norwegian ice hockey player (born 1992)

- Born: March 10, 1992 (age 34) Asker, Norway
- Height: 5 ft 10 in (178 cm)
- Weight: 170 lb (77 kg; 12 st 2 lb)
- Position: Left wing
- Shoots: Left
- GET team Former teams: Frisk Asker; Frisk Asker; Luleå HF; Sparta Warriors; Djurgårdens IF; Örebro HK; Mora IK; Lukko; Black Wings Linz
- National team: Norway
- Playing career: 2009–present

Michael Haga (born 10 March 1992) is a Norwegian professional ice hockey player who is currently playing with Frisk Asker in the GET-ligaen (GET).

== Playing career ==
He played youth ice hockey in Norway for Frisk Asker before making his senior debut in the GET-ligaen in the 2008–09 season. He has played in the SHL with Luleå HF and Djurgårdens IF before, on April 27, 2016, he opted to join Örebro HK on a one-year agreement.

Following Mora IK's relegation to the Allsvenskan after the 2018–19 season, Haga left the team to remain in the SHL by signing a two-year contract with Djurgården, where he was previously loaned on two occasions, on May 11, 2019.
