= 2020–21 Fjordkraftligaen season =

- League: (Norway) Fjordkraftligaen
- Sport: Ice hockey
- Duration: 3 October 2020 – 7 January 2021
- Number of teams: 10
- TV partner(s): TV 2 Sport

Regular season
- League champions: Frisk Asker (6th title)

Eliteserien seasons
- ← 2019–20 2021–22 →

The 2020–21 Fjordkraftligaen was the 82nd season of Norway's premier ice hockey league, Eliteserien, and the 1st under the sponsorship name Fjordkraftligaen. In January 2021, the season was put to a halt due to COVID-19 infections in many of the teams. In March 2021, the season was abandoned.

== Participating teams ==
Fjordkraftligaen teams

Team	City	Arena	Capacity
Frisk Asker	Asker	Askerhallen	2,400
Grüner	Oslo	Grünerhallen	500
Lillehammer IK	Lillehammer	Eidsiva Arena	3,197
Manglerud Star	Oslo	Manglerudhallen	1,050
Narvik	Narvik	Nordkraft Arena	1,400
Sparta Sarpsborg	Sarpsborg	Sparta Amfi	3,450
Stavanger Oilers	Stavanger	DNB Arena	4,377
Stjernen	Fredrikstad	Stjernehallen	2,473
Storhamar	Hamar	CC Amfi	7,000
Vålerenga	Oslo	Nye Jordal Amfi	5,300

== Regular season ==
=== Standings ===
Pos	Team	Pld	W	OTW	OTL	L	GF	GA	GD	Pts	PPG	Qualification
1	Frisk Asker (C)	23	17	0	1	5	92	52	+40	52	2.26	
2	Storhamar	24	17	1	0	6	98	57	+41	53	2.21	
3	Stavanger Oilers	24	15	1	1	7	97	52	+45	48	2.00	
4	Vålerenga	25	16	0	2	7	84	67	+17	50	2.00	
5	Lillehammer	24	13	1	3	7	83	71	+12	44	1.83	
6	Stjernen	24	11	3	0	10	97	79	+18	39	1.63	
7	Sparta Sarpsborg	19	4	3	1	11	51	64	−13	19	1.00	
8	Manglerud Star	22	6	1	2	13	62	96	−34	22	1.00	
9	Grüner	20	3	0	1	16	39	99	−60	10	0.50	
10	Narvik (R)	27	3	1	0	23	51	117	−66	11	0.41	Relegation to First Division

Source: Hockey.no
Rules for classification: 1) Points; 2) Head-to-head points.
(C) Champion; (R) Relegated
