= 2014–15 GET-ligaen season =

- League: (Norway) GET-ligaen
- Sport: Ice hockey
- Duration: 11 September 2014 – 18 April 2015
- Games: 45
- Teams: 10
- TV partner: TV 2 Sport

Regular season
- League champions: Stavanger Oilers

Playoffs
- Norwegian champions: Stavanger Oilers

GET-ligaen seasons
- 2013–14 2015–16

The 2014–15 GET-ligaen is the 76th and current season of Norway's premier ice hockey league, Eliteserien (known as GET-ligaen for sponsorship reasons).

The regular season began play on September 11, 2014, and was concluded on March 3, 2015.

The playoffs to determine the 2014 Norwegian Ice Hockey Champions began on March 6, and ended April 18, 2015.

== Participating teams ==
Team	City	Arena	Capacity
Frisk Asker Tigers	Asker	Askerhallen	2,400
Kongsvinger Knights	Kongsvinger	Kongsvinger Ishall	2,000
Lillehammer IK	Lillehammer	Kristins Hall	3,194
Lørenskog IK	Lørenskog	Lørenskog Ishall	2,400
Manglerud Star	Oslo	Manglerudhallen	2,000
Sparta Warriors	Sarpsborg	Sparta Amfi	3,450
Stavanger Oilers	Stavanger	DNB Arena	4,377
Stjernen	Fredrikstad	Stjernehallen	2,473
Storhamar Dragons	Hamar	Hamar OL-Amfi	6,091
Vålerenga	Oslo	Jordal Amfi	4,450

=== Team changes ===
- Rosenborg failed to renew its professional license to play in the GET-liga. The vacant spot was given to Manglerud Star.
- Due to the struggling economy, the board of the Tønsberg Vikings asked that the team was to be moved down one division. The vacant spot was given to Kongsvinger Knights.

== Regular season ==
=== Standings ===
Updated as of April 23, 2015.^{4}

2014–15 GET-ligaen season	GP	W	L	OTW	OTL	GF	GA	+/–	Pts
Stavanger Oilers^{y}	45	32	9	3	1	187	93	+94	100^{1}
Storhamar Dragons^{x}	45	29	10	2	4	200	112	+88	95
Sparta Warriors^{x}	45	26	14	0	5	176	122	+54	83
Lørenskog IK^{x}	45	22	15	4	4	150	123	+27	78
Vålerenga^{x}	45	24	15	2	4	178	126	+52	74^{2}
Frisk Asker Tigers^{x}	45	24	15	5	1	158	110	+48	71^{4}
Lillehammer IK^{x}	45	18	21	5	1	140	137	+3	65
Stjernen^{x}	45	16	25	3	1	127	170	-43	47^{3}
Manglerud Star^{r}	45	4	34	3	4	82	206	-124	22
Kongsvinger Knights^{r}	45	2	39	1	3	73	272	-199	11

x – clinched playoff spot; y – clinched regular season league title; r – play in relegation series

^{1} Stavanger were deducted 3 points for using eligible player. Match between Stavanger and Vålerenga February 28, 2015, set to 0-0.
^{2} Vålerenga were deducted 6 points for using eligible player. Match between Stavanger and Vålerenga February 28, 2015, set to 0-0.
^{3} Stjernen were deducted 8 points for using eligible player.
^{4}After the playoffs had ended, Frisk-Asker were deducted 12 points for using eligible player.

Source: pointstreak.com

=== Statistics ===
==== Scoring leaders ====
List shows the ten best skaters based on the number of points during the regular season. If two or more skaters are tied (i.e. same number of points, goals and played games), all of the tied skaters are shown. Updated as of March 6, 2015.

GP = Games played; G = Goals; A = Assists; Pts = Points; +/– = Plus/Minus; PIM = Penalty Minutes

Player	Team	GP	G	A	Pts	+/–	PIM
(Italy) Brian Ihnacak	Vålerenga	44	22	55	77	+19	60
(Canada) Éric Castonguay	Frisk Asker Tigers	41	22	51	73	+7	20
(Canada) Christian Larrivée	Storhamar Dragons	45	25	45	70	+43	40
(United States) Denny Kearney	Frisk Asker Tigers	45	29	39	68	+22	76
(Sweden) Henrik Malmström	Sparta Warriors	45	21	42	63	+25	20
(United States) Dan Kissel	Stavanger Oilers	44	23	37	60	+31	20
(Canada) Dion Knelsen	Sparta Warriors	44	25	33	58	+14	26
(Norway) Daniel Sørvik	Vålerenga	45	19	39	58	+2	60
(Norway) Joakim Jensen	Storhamar Dragons	45	30	27	57	+32	14
(Canada) Josh Soares	Stavanger Oilers	45	30	27	57	+34	42

Source: pointstreak.com

==== Leading goaltenders ====
The top five goaltenders based on goals against average. Updated as of March 6, 2015.

Player	Team	GP	TOI	W	L	GA	SO	Sv%	GAA
(Norway) Ruben Smith	Stavanger Oilers	28	1620:14	20	7	54	4	.914	2.00
(Canada) Andrew Engelage	Storhamar Dragons	37	2116:08	25	11	75	2	.927	2.13
(Norway) Henrik Holm	Stavanger Oilers	19	1087:54	15	3	41	1	.909	2.26
(Sweden) Nicklas Dahlberg	Frisk Asker Tigers	43	2587:26	28	15	98	5	.926	2.27
(Canada) Tyler Plante	Lørenskog IK	27	1532:46	18	9	60	2	.918	2.35

Source: pointstreak.com

==== Attendance ====
Team	Arena	Capacity	Total	Games	Average	% of Capacity
Frisk Tigers	Askerhallen	2,400	26,597	22	1,208	0,50
Stavanger Oilers	DNB Arena	4,377	94,199	23	4,095	0,93
Storhamar Dragons	Hamar OL-Amfi	6,091	68,041	22	3,092	0,51
Vålerenga	Jordal Amfi	4,450	60,883	23	2,647	0,60
Kongsvinger Knights	Kongsvinger Ishall	2,000	13,886	23	603	0,30
Lillehammer	Kristins Hall	3,194	34,827	23	1,514	0,47
Lørenskog	Lørenskog Ishall	1,350	29,804	22	1,354	1,00
Manglerud Star	Manglerudhallen	2,000	9,254	22	420	0,21
Sparta Warriors	Sparta Amfi	3,450	46,815	22	2,127	0,62
Stjernen	Stjernehallen	2,473	35,464	23	1,541	0,62

Source:pointstreak.com

== Playoffs ==
After the regular season, the top eight teams qualified for the playoffs. In the first and second rounds, the highest remaining seed chose which of the two lowest remaining seeds to be matched against. In each round the higher-seeded team was awarded home ice advantage. Each best-of-seven series followed a 1–1–1–1–1–1–1 format: the higher-seeded team played at home for games 1 and 3 (plus 5 and 7 if necessary), and the lower-seeded team at home for games 2, 4 and 6 (if necessary).

=== Bracket ===
Updated as of April 18, 2015.

Quarter-finals
1	Stavanger Oilers	4
8	Stjernen	0
2	Storhamar	4
7	Lillehammer	0
(Pairings are reseeded after the first round)
3	Sparta Warriors	4
5	Lørenskog	2
4	Frisk Asker Tigers	2
6	Vålerenga	4

Semi-finals
1	Stavanger Oilers	4
6	Vålerenga	0
2	Storhamar	4
3	Sparta Warriors	1

Finals
1	Stavanger Oilers	4
2	Storhamar	3

Source: pointstreak.com

Norwegian Champions
2015
Stavanger Oilers
5th title

=== Statistics ===
==== Scoring leaders ====
List shows the ten best skaters based on the number of points during the playoffs. If two or more skaters are tied (i.e. same number of points, goals and played games), all of the tied skaters are shown. Updated as of April 18, 2015.
GP = Games played; G = Goals; A = Assists; Pts = Points; +/– = Plus/Minus; PIM = Penalty Minutes

Player	Team	GP	G	A	Pts	+/–	PIM
(Canada) Christian Larrivée	Storhamar Dragons	16	10	13	23	+9	10
(Sweden) Jacob Berglund	Storhamar Dragons	16	8	11	19	+2	16
(Norway) Joakim Jensen	Storhamar Dragons	16	6	12	18	+4	2
(Sweden) Linus Johansson	Storhamar Dragons	16	6	12	18	+5	14
(Canada) Josh Soares	Stavanger Oilers	15	7	8	15	+9	73
(United States) Luke Moffatt	Storhamar Dragons	16	6	8	14	+3	4
(Norway) Eirik Skadsdammen	Storhamar Dragons	16	5	9	14	+10	14
(United States) Dan Kissel	Stavanger Oilers	15	5	9	14	+8	4
(Canada) Dion Knelsen	Sparta Warriors	11	6	6	12	-2	2
(Canada) Simon Gamache	Vålerenga Ishockey	10	5	7	12	+4	6
(Sweden) Henrik Malmström	Sparta Warriors	11	4	8	12	+2	6

Source: pointstreak.com

==== Leading goaltenders ====
The top five goaltenders based on goals against average.

Player	Team	GP	TOI	W	L	GA	SO	Sv%	GAA
(Norway) Ruben Smith	Stavanger Oilers	15	859:17	11	2	31	1	.918	2.16
(Norway) Steffen Søberg	Vålerenga	10	630:21	4	6	24	1	.916	2.28
(Canada) Andrew Engelage	Storhamar Dragons	16	977:25	11	5	38	1	.927	2.33
(Norway) Tommy Johansen	Sparta Warriors	11	600:14	5	6	30	1	.903	2.73
(Canada) Tyler Plante	Lørenskog IK	6	355:48	2	4	18	0	.897	3.04

Source: pointstreak.com

== Qualification ==
After the regular season had ended, the two lowest ranked teams in the league and the two highest ranked teams in the 1. divisjon competed for the right to play in the 2015–16 GET-ligaen. Kongsvinger Knights, Manglerud Star, Tønsberg Vikings and Comet Halden took part. The tournament wias organized according to a double round robin format, where each club played the others twice, home and away, for a total of six games. The points system and ranking method used, was the same as in the GET-ligaen. The qualification was played between March 5 and March 22.

=== Standings ===
Updated as of March 22, 2015.

2015–16 GET-ligaen playoffs	GP	W	L	OTW	OTL	GF	GA	+/–	Pts
Manglerud Star^{q}	6	4	1	1	0	27	14	+13	14^{4}
Kongsvinger Knights^{q}	6	3	2	0	1	19	22	-3	10
Tønsberg Vikings^{r}	6	2	3	1	0	21	23	-2	8^{4}
Comet Halden^{r}	6	1	4	0	1	18	26	-8	4

q – qualified for next years GET-league; r – will play in next years 1. division

^{4} Due to use of eligible player by Tønsberg, Manglerud was given the victory of the match March 5, 2015. Result was set to 5–0 to Manglerud.

Source: speaker.no

== Awards ==
All-Star team

The following players were selected to the 2014–15 GET-ligaen All-Star team:

- Goaltender: Nicklas Dahlberg (Frisk)
- Defenseman: Daniel Sørvik (Vålerenga)
- Defenseman: Erik de la Rose (Storhamar)
- Center: Christian Larrivée (Storhamar)
- Winger: Mathias Trettenes (Stavanger)
- Winger: Brian Ihnacak (Vålerenga)

Other

- Coach of the year: Alexander Smirnov (Storhamar)
- Rookie of the year: Martin Gran (Storhamar)
