= 2018–19 GET-ligaen season =

- League: (Norway) GET-ligaen
- Sport: Ice hockey
- Duration: 8 September 2018 – mid April 2019
- Number of games: 48
- Number of teams: 9
- TV partner(s): TV 2 Sport

Regular season
- League champions: Vålerenga
- Top scorer: Rasmus Ahlholm

Playoffs
- Norwegian champions: Frisk Asker

GET-ligaen seasons
- ← 2017–18 2019–20 →

The 2018–19 GET-ligaen was the 80th season of Norway's premier ice hockey league, GET-ligaen.

The regular season began on 8 September 2018, and was concluded on March 5, 2019.

The playoffs to determine the 2019 Norwegian Ice Hockey Champions began March 7, and ended April 15, 2019.

== Participating teams ==
GET-ligaen teams

Team	City	Arena	Capacity
Frisk Asker	Asker	Askerhallen	2,400
Lillehammer IK	Lillehammer	Kristins Hall; Håkons Hall	3,194; 11,500
Manglerud Star	Oslo	Manglerudhallen; Gjøvik Olympic Cavern Hall	2,000; 5,830
Ringerike Panthers	Hønefoss	Schjongshallen	1,500
Sparta Warriors	Sarpsborg	Sparta Amfi	3,450
Stavanger Oilers	Stavanger	DNB Arena	4,377
Stjernen	Fredrikstad	Stjernehallen	2,473
Storhamar	Hamar	CC Amfi	7,000
Vålerenga	Oslo	Furuset Forum	2,050

=== Team changes ===
- After finishing second in the qualification for the 2018-19 season, Ringerike Panthers qualified for the GET-liga, replacing Kongsvinger Knights who finished fourth.
- Due to long-term economic problems, Lørenskog IK failed to receive a professional license to play in the GET-liga. The vacant spot was offered first to Narvik IK, then to Kongsvinger Knights, who both declined the spot.

== Arenas ==
Since Nye Jordal Amfi will not be completed until the 2020–21 season, Vålerenga used Furuset Forum as a temporary arena the whole season.

Lillehammer repeated their Winter Classic match in Håkons Hall from the 2017-18 season against Storhamar. The match was played on November 17, 2018.

Manglerud Star played a home match against Storhamar Hockey in the Gjøvik Olympic Cavern Hall. The match was played on October 29, 2018.

== Coaching changes ==
Coaching changes
Offseason
Team	2017–18 coach	2018–19 coach	Story / Accomplishments
Stavanger Oilers	Pål Gulbrandsen	Todd Bjorkstrand	After disappointing results, Stavanger Oilers on April 5, 2018, announced that the contract with head coach Pål Gulbrandsen would not be renewed. On May 4, 2018, Todd Bjorkstrand was announced as new head coach for the club.
Stjernen	Jörgen Wahlberg; Darren Treloar	Bengt-Åke Gustafsson	On April 12, 2018, Stjernen announced Bengt-Åke Gustafsson as new head coach for the 2018-19 season.
Frisk Asker	Sune Bergman	Scott Hillman	On April 17, 2018, Stjernen announced that they would not renew the contract with long time head coach Sune Berman. On June 7, 2018, Scott Hillman was announced as new head coach for the club.
In-season
Team	Outgoing coach	Incoming coach	Story / Accomplishments
Frisk Asker	Scott Hillman	Jan André Aasland	The club announced that Hillman was fired on December 17, 2018. Assistant coach Aasland was named the interim head coach. He later got the job on a permanent basis.
Stjernen	Bengt-Åke Gustafsson	Rune Gulliksen	On January 28, 2019, the club announced that due to disappointing results, Gustafsson had left under mutual consent. Rune Gulliksen was named new head coach for the remaining season.

== Regular season ==
=== Standings ===
Updated as of March 5, 2019.

2018–19 GET-ligaen season	GP	W	L	OTW	OTL	GF	GA	+/–	Pts
Vålerenga^{y}	48	32	7	3	6	196	102	94	108
Storhamar^{x}	48	28	8	8	4	175	97	78	104
Stavanger Oilers^{x}	48	28	8	5	7	172	109	63	101
Lillehammer^{x}	48	25	14	6	3	185	141	44	90
Frisk Asker^{x}	48	22	18	4	4	162	151	11	78
Sparta Warriors^{x}	48	18	18	5	7	137	141	-4	71
Manglerud Star^{x}	48	9	32	4	3	102	171	-69	38
Stjernen^{x}	48	9	31	3	5	115	214	-99	38
Ringerike Panthers^{r}	48	2	37	5	4	96	214	-118	20

x – clinched playoff spot; y – clinched regular season league title; r – play in relegation series

Source: hockey.no

=== Statistics ===
==== Scoring leaders ====
List shows the ten best skaters based on the number of points during the regular season. If two or more skaters are tied (i.e. same number of points, goals and played games), all of the tied skaters are shown. Updated as of September 7, 2018.

GP = Games played; G = Goals; A = Assists; Pts = Points; +/– = Plus/Minus; PIM = Penalty Minutes

Player	Team	GP	G	A	Pts	+/–	PIM

Source: hockey.no

==== Leading goaltenders ====
The top five goaltenders based on goals against average. Updated as of September 7, 2018.

Player	Team	GP	TOI	W	L	GA	SO	Sv%	GAA

Source: hockey.no

==== Attendance ====
Team	Arena	Capacity	Total	Games	Average	% of Capacity
Frisk Asker	Askerhallen	2,400				
Stavanger Oilers	DNB Arena	4,377				
Storhamar Hockey	Hamar OL-Amfi	7,000				
Vålerenga	Furuset Forum	2,050				
Lillehammer	Kristins Hall	3,194				
Manglerud Star	Manglerudhallen	2,000				
Ringerike Panthers	Schjongshallen	1,500				
Sparta Warriors	Sparta Amfi	4,000				
Stjernen	Stjernehallen	2,473				

Source:hockey.no

== Playoffs ==
After the regular season, the top eight teams qualified for the playoffs. In the first and second rounds, the highest remaining seed chose which of the two lowest remaining seeds to be matched against. In each round the higher-seeded team was awarded home ice advantage. Each best-of-seven series followed a 1–1–1–1–1–1–1 format: the higher-seeded team played at home for games 1 and 3 (plus 5 and 7 if necessary), and the lower-seeded team at home for games 2, 4 and 6 (if necessary).

=== Bracket ===
Updated as of April 13, 2019.

Quarter-finals
1	Vålerenga	4
7	Manglerud Star	1
2	Storhamar	4
8	Stjernen	0
(Pairings are reseeded after the first round)
3	Stavanger Oilers	4
6	Sparta Warriors	2
4	Lillehammer	3
5	Frisk Asker	4

Semi-finals
1	Vålerenga	2
5	Frisk Asker	4
2	Storhamar	4
3	Stavanger Oilers	2

Finals
2	Storhamar	2
5	Frisk Asker	4

Source: hockey.no

Norwegian Champions
2019
Frisk Asker
4th title

== Qualification ==
After the regular season has ended, the lowest ranked team in the league and the two highest ranked teams in the 1. divisjon will compete for the right to play in the 2019–20 GET-ligaen. The tournament will be organized according to a double round robin format, where each club plays the others twice, home and away, for a total of six games. The points system and ranking method used, will be the same as in the GET-ligaen.

=== Standings ===
Updated as of March 21, 2019.

	GP	W	L	OTW	OTL	GF	GA	+/–	Pts
Narvik^{q}	3	2	1	0	0	12	10	2	6
Grüner^{q}	3	1	1	1	0	9	8	1	5
Ringerike Panthers^{r}	4	1	2	0	1	9	12	-3	4

q – qualified for next years GET-league; r – will play in next years 1. division

Source: hockey.no
