= Frisk Asker Ishockey =

Frisk Asker
- Nickname: Tigers
- City: Asker, Norway
- League: EliteHockey Ligaen
- Founded: 1935; 91 years ago
- Home arena: Varner Arena
- Colors: Orange, black and white
- General manager: Ole G. Haug
- Head coach: Roy Johansen
- Captain: Michael Haga
- Affiliates: Asker og Bærum Ishockey (2. div)
- Website: friskaskerhockey.no

Franchise history
- 1935–1992: Frisk
- 1992–1994: Asker Hockey
- 1994–2010: Frisk Tigers
- 2010-present: Frisk Asker

Championships
- Regular season titles: 6
- Playoff championships: 1975, 1979, 2002, 2019

Frisk Asker Ishockey, commonly known as Frisk Asker or Frisk Tigers Asker, is a Norwegian ice hockey club based in Asker, Norway. The team is currently a member of the highest Norwegian ice hockey league, EliteHockey Ligaen. They are based in the municipality of Asker, around 20 km from Oslo, and play their home games in Varner Arena. The team colours are orange, black and white.

Frisk Asker is the ice hockey division of the Norwegian sports club IF Frisk Asker, founded in 1922. The ice hockey division was started in 1935. Having merged with IK Tigrene in 1969, Frisk became one of the strongest teams in Norwegian ice hockey, winning two national championships and four regular season titles during the 1970s. In the 2000s, the club won another two titles, one regular season title and one national championship, while competing as the Frisk Tigers.

== History ==
Frisk Tigers logo 1990s–2010

Frisk is one of the oldest ice hockey clubs in Norway, dating back to 1935. For most of the early years the club did alright, playing mostly in the lower regional leagues. In 1968 the club was set for a great new era. Farmer Bjørn Mortensen wished to give something back to the community by building an indoor ice rink in Asker. It was the first of its kind in the Oslo area, and gave the club a tremendous lift.

Askerhallen was opened on 31 August 1969, and led to a series of events that would bring Frisk to the pinnacle of Norwegian Ice Hockey in only a few years. In Asker the facilities was first class, but playing material scarce. In Oslo, a club called Tigrene, had the exact opposite problems, so the two clubs decided to merge. Frisk immediately rose to become one of the top teams in the league.

In May 1972 disaster struck, as the Askerhallen was badly damaged in a fire. Mortensen however wished to continue his commitment, and have the arena rebuilt. The new Askerhallen was opened in 1973.

The seventies proved to be the most successful years for Frisk. Winning the Norwegian championships in 1975 and 1979.

Through the eighties Frisk stayed in the top flight, and excelled at producing talented hockey-players. Led by inspirational coach Barry Smith they made a new appearance in the play off finals in 1986. On the most however they failed to make any real impact and economical problems led the club into recession and finally relegation in the mid nineties. A merger with local club Holmen, under the name of Asker Hockey proved unsuccessful and in 1995 Frisk was back in the top league on their own feet.

The turn of the millennium saw Frisk Asker stabilized as a strong team in the top flight. In 2002, Frisk could finally celebrate their third Norwegian championship, after beating the Storhamar Dragons in a dramatic final.

Frisk won their fourth Norwegian championship in 2019.

== Current roster ==
Updated 2 January 2025.

No.	Nat	Player	Pos	S/G	Age	Acquired	Birthplace
55	(Norway)	Petter Birkheim Andersen	D	R	26	2023	Oslo, Norway
13	(Norway)	Nicolay Andresen	D	L	33	2011	Asker, Norway
48	(Norway)	Fredrik Bjørndal	LW	L	24	2020	Bærum, Norway
2	(Sweden)	Anton Björkman	D	L	27	2024	Linköping, Sweden
51	(Norway)	Christian Vethe Bye	C	L	23	2021	Asker, Norway
5	(Sweden)	Mattias Bäckman	D	L	33	2023	Linköping, Sweden
81	(Norway)	Marcus Valkvæ Erevik	C	L	22	2022	Asker, Norway
40	(Norway)	Tobias Fladeby	LW	L	30	2023	Asker, Norway
28	(Norway)	Magnus Geheb (A)	C	L	27	2017	Asker, Norway
30	(Canada)	Mitch Gillam	G	L	33	2023	Peterborough, Ontario, Canada
24	(Sweden)	Hampus Gustafsson	LW	L	35	2018	Malmö, Sweden
85	(Norway)	Michael Haga (C)	C	L	34	2023	Asker, Norway
6	(Norway)	Jonas Slettebø Haughom	D	L	24	2024	Stavanger, Norway
23	(Norway)	Joachim Lunde Hermansen	D	L	27	2024	Oslo, Norway
44	(Norway)	Mathias Schippers Landa	G	L	24	2024	Asker, Norway
46	(Norway)	Tobias Lindström (A)	C	R	38	2023	Stockholm, Sweden
93	(Norway)	Thomas Valkvæ Olsen	RW	R	33	2022	Asker, Norway
31	(Norway)	Tobias Skuterud	F	L	29	2023	Asker, Norway
19	(Norway)	Nils Sunde	D	L	18	2024	Kristiansand, Norway
3	(Norway)	Patrick Ulriksen	D	L	36	2024	Oslo, Norway
14	(Norway)	Emil Kvernmo Wasenden	D	L	22	2021	Oslo, Norway
34	(Norway)	Eskil Wold	LW	L	23	2023	Asker, Norway
88	(Norway)	Sander Wold	C	L	21	2024	Asker, Norway

== Season-by-season results ==
This is a partial list of the last ten seasons completed by Frisk Asker. For the full season-by-season history, see List of Frisk Asker Ishockey seasons.

Norwegian Champions	Regular season champions	Promoted	Relegated

Season	League	Regular season (Note: Code explanation; GP—Games Played, W—Wins, L—Losses, OTW—Overtime/Shootout wins, OTL—Overtime/Shootout losses, GF—Goals For, GA—Goals Against, Pts—Points)									Postseason
Season	League	GP	W	L	OTW	OTL	GF	GA	Pts	Finish	Postseason
2013–14	Eliteserien	45	13	24	5	3	122	158	52	7th	Lost in quarter-finals, 1–4 (Vålerenga)
2014–15	Eliteserien	45	24	15	5	1	158	110	71	6th	Lost in quarter-finals, 2–4 (Vålerenga)
2015–16	Eliteserien	45	24	12	5	4	139	105	86	3rd	Lost in quarter-finals, 2–4 (Vålerenga)
2016–17	Eliteserien	45	21	15	3	6	137	118	75	4th	Lost in Finals, 2–4 (Stavanger)
2017–18	Eliteserien	45	24	13	4	4	159	120	84	4th	Lost in semi-finals, 1–4 (Storhamar)
2018–19	Eliteserien	48	22	18	4	4	162	151	78	5th	Won Norwegian Championship, 4–2 (Storhamar)
2019–20	Eliteserien	45	24	18	1	2	135	125	76	4th	Cancelled due to the COVID-19 pandemic
2020–21	Eliteserien	23	17	5	0	1	92	52	52	1st	Cancelled due to the COVID-19 pandemic
2021–22	Eliteserien	45	22	15	5	3	171	138	79	5th	Lost in quarter-finals, 2–4 (Sparta)
2022–23	Eliteserien	45	21	16	4	4	146	144	75	6th	Lost in quarter-finals, 0–4 (Vålerenga)
2023–24	Eliteserien	45	23	15	2	5	167	129	78	5th	Lost in semi-finals, 1–4 (Storhamar)

=== Retired numbers ===
Retired numbers
No.	Player	Position	Career	Number retirement
4	Thor Martinsen	D	1969–1981	30 January 2011
9	Morten Johansen	C	1972–1988	25 February 2016
10	Morten Sethereng	RW	1972–1986	13 September 2012
56	Johnny Nilsen	D	1991–2009	30 December 2017

== Records and statistics ==
Statistics for regular season and playoffs.

- – current active player

=== Scoring leaders ===
Goals
Player	Seasons	Pos	Goals
Morten Sethereng	1972–1986	RW	365
Trond Skar	1973–1981	FW	208
Vidar Johansen	1970–1985	RW	196
Kyle McDonough	1996–2002	C	182
Morten Johansen	1972–1988	C	181
Dag Høyem	1985–2002	C	157
Pål Martinsen	1986–1991; 1997–1999	C	156
Henrik Aaby	1991–1994; 1997–2007	LW	156
Anders Bastiansen	1996–2004 2014–2023	C	145
Marius Voigt	1979–1989	D	134

=== Most league matches ===
Matches
Player	Career	Matches
Petter Kristiansen	2004–2020	763
Anders Bastiansen	1996–2003 2015–2023	666
Johnny Nilsen	1991–2009	643
Nicolay Andresen	2011–	596
Dag Høyem	1985–2002	524
Nicklas Dahlberg	2012–2023	442
Morten Johansen	1972–1988	441
Vidar Wold	1991–2007	435
Henrik Ødegård	2006–2011 2016–2020	428
Henrik Aaby	1991–1994; 1997–2007	423

Last updated: 4 April 2023
Source: https://www.friskaskerhockey.no/artikel/4t4jalgdh-254l1/klubbrekorder

== Leaders ==
=== Head coaches ===
- Barry Smith 1984–1986
- Henry Hamberg 1996–1998
- Serge Boisvert 1998–2003
- Ulf Weinstock 2003–2004
- Michael A. L. Tipson 20/20
- Jan Votruba 2004–2005
- Esa Tikkanen 2005–2006
- Patrik Christer Ross 2006–2007
- Sune Bergman 2007–2010
- Mats Lusth 2010–2012
- Sune Bergman 2012–2018
- Scott Hillman 2018–2019
- Janna Aasland 2019–2023
- Vidar Wold 2019–2021 (co-head coach) 2023-2023 (Interim Head Coach)
- Roy Johansen 2023–
