= 2016–17 GET-ligaen season =

- League: (Norway) GET-ligaen
- Sport: Ice hockey
- Duration: September 2016 – mid April 2017
- Number of games: 45
- Number of teams: 10
- TV partner(s): TV 2 Sport

Regular season
- League champions: Stavanger Oilers

Playoffs
- Norwegian champions: Stavanger Oilers
- Norwegian runners-up: Frisk Asker

GET-ligaen seasons
- ← 2015–16 2017–18 →

The 2016–17 GET-ligaen was the 78th season of Norway's premier ice hockey league, GET-ligaen.

The regular season began play in September 2016. There were no team changes from the 2015–16 season.

== Participating teams ==
GET-ligaen teams

Team	City	Arena	Capacity
Frisk Asker	Asker	Askerhallen	2,400
Kongsvinger Knights	Kongsvinger	Kongsvinger Ishall	2,000
Lillehammer IK	Lillehammer	Kristins Hall	3,194
Lørenskog IK	Lørenskog	Lørenskog Ishall	2,400
Manglerud Star	Oslo	Manglerudhallen	2,000
Sparta Warriors	Sarpsborg	Sparta Amfi	3,450
Stavanger Oilers	Stavanger	DNB Arena	4,377
Stjernen	Fredrikstad	Stjernehallen	2,473
Storhamar	Hamar	CC Amfi	7,000
Vålerenga	Oslo	Jordal Amfi; Furuset Forum	4,450; 1,200

== Arenas ==
Vålerenga Ishockey played their last home game at Jordal Amfi on January 7. A new arena will be constructed at the site, planned for completion in September 2018. Vålerenga will finish the season with Furuset Forum as a temporary arena.

== Regular season ==
=== Winter Classic ===
An outdoor match featuring Stjernen and Sparta Warriors was played January 21, 2017. The match was played on Fredrikstad stadion and was the first major outdoor match in Norway in the 21st century. The match ended with a 3-0 victory for Sparta in front of a record audience of 12.500.

=== Standings ===
Updated as of February 28, 2017.

2016–17 GET-ligaen season	GP	W	L	OTW	OTL	GF	GA	+/–	Pts
Stavanger Oilers^{y}	45	28	10	6	1	174	102	72	97
Lørenskog^{x}	45	26	11	4	4	158	100	58	90
Storhamar^{x}	45	21	14	3	7	131	104	27	76
Frisk Asker^{x}	45	21	15	3	6	137	118	19	75
Vålerenga^{x}	45	20	16	4	5	135	111	24	73
Lillehammer^{x}	45	17	16	9	3	138	131	7	72
Stjernen^{x}	45	20	17	3	5	142	136	6	71
Sparta Warriors^{x}	45	18	20	1	6	128	111	17	62
Manglerud Star^{r}	45	12	24	8	1	100	148	-48	53
Kongsvinger Knights^{r}	45	1	41	0	3	61	243	-182	6

x – clinched playoff spot; y – clinched regular season league title; r – play in relegation series

Source: scoreboard.com

=== Statistics ===
==== Scoring leaders ====
List shows the ten best skaters based on the number of points during the regular season. If two or more skaters are tied (i.e. same number of points, goals and played games), all of the tied skaters are shown. Updated as of February 28, 2017.

GP = Games played; G = Goals; A = Assists; Pts = Points; +/– = Plus/Minus; PIM = Penalty Minutes

Player	Team	GP	G	A	Pts	+/–	PIM
(United States) Mark Van Guilder	Stavanger	45	24	41	65	+32	32
(United States) Dan Kissel	Stavanger	45	29	30	59	+27	16
(Sweden) Tobias Lindström	Vålerenga	45	29	29	58	+19	38
(Sweden) Victor Backman	Stjernen	40	26	28	54	+10	36
(Norway) Stefan Espeland	Lørenskog	45	10	42	52	+26	32
(United States) Vinny Saponari	Frisk Asker	43	15	36	51	+2	14
(Norway) Martin Laumann Ylven	Vålerenga	45	28	22	50	+18	30
(Canada) Jason Krog	Lørenskog	45	21	26	47	+24	14
(Canada) Stephan Vigier	Lillehammer	45	17	29	46	+11	56
(Sweden) Rasmus Ahlholm	Vålerenga	45	15	30	45	+11	8
(Canada) Josh Soares	Stavanger Oilers	43	14	31	45	+15	64

Source: hockey.no

==== Leading goaltenders ====
The top five goaltenders based on goals against average. Updated as of March 25, 2016.

Player	Team	GP	TOI	W	L	GA	SO	Sv%	GAA

Source: pointstreak.com

==== Attendance ====
Team	Arena	Capacity	Total	Games	Average	% of Capacity
Frisk Asker	Askerhallen	2,400				
Stavanger Oilers	DNB Arena	4,377				
Storhamar	CC Amfi	7,000				
Vålerenga	Jordal Amfi	4,450				
Kongsvinger Knights	Kongsvinger Ishall	2,000				
Lillehammer	Kristins Hall	3,194				
Lørenskog	Lørenskog Ishall	2,450				
Manglerud Star	Manglerudhallen	2,000				
Sparta Warriors	Sparta Amfi	3,450				
Stjernen	Stjernehallen	2,473				

Source:pointstreak.com

== Coaching changes ==
Coaching changes
Offseason
Team	2015–16 coach	2016–17 coach	Story / Accomplishments
Vålerenga Ishockey	Espen Knutsen	Roy Johansen	In June 2015, Knutsen announced that he would step down as head coach after the 2015-16 season. On 21 January 2016, Vålerenga announced national team coach Roy Johansen as Knutsen's replacement.
Stavanger Oilers	Petter Thoresen	Pål Gulbrandsen	Petter Thoresen was announced as the new head coach for the Norwegian national hockey team in December 2015. In February 2016, assistant coach Pål Gulbrandsen was announced as the new head coach of the Oilers, starting from the summer of 2016.
Kongsvinger Knights	Per Lundell	Janne Saaavalainen	On March 30, 2016 the club announced that Per Lundell did not want to extend his contract for 16/17. This is due to private, family reasons. On May 14, 2016, Janne Saaavalainen was presented as new head coach for the club.
Storhamar Hockey	Alexander Smirnov	Sjur Robert Nilsen	On April 29, Smirnov announced that he had signed with KHL club Ak Bars Kazan as part of their coaching team for the 2016-17 season. Sjur Robert Nilsen was announced as the new head coach on May 20.
In-season
Team	Outgoing coach	Incoming coach	Story / Accomplishments
Kongsvinger Knights	Janne Saavalainen	Anders Angelbrant	Janne Saavalainen left Kongsvinger on 7 January. He was replaced by Anders Angelbrant.

== Playoffs ==
After the regular season, the top eight teams qualified for the playoffs. In the first and second rounds, the highest remaining seed chose which of the two lowest remaining seeds to be matched against. In each round the higher-seeded team was awarded home ice advantage. Each best-of-seven series followed a 1–1–1–1–1–1–1 format: the higher-seeded team played at home for games 1 and 3 (plus 5 and 7 if necessary), and the lower-seeded team at home for games 2, 4 and 6 (if necessary).

=== Bracket ===
Updated as of April 11, 2017.

Quarter-finals
1	Stavanger Oilers	4
7	Stjernen	0
2	Lørenskog	3
6	Lillehammer	4
(Pairings are reseeded after the first round)
3	Storhamar	3
8	Sparta Warriors	4
4	Frisk Asker Tigers	4
5	Vålerenga	2

Semi-finals
1	Stavanger Oilers	4
8	Sparta Warriors	0
4	Frisk Asker Tigers	4
6	Lillehammer	1

Finals
1	Stavanger Oilers	4
4	Frisk Asker Tigers	2

Source: hockey.no

Norwegian Champions
2017
Stavanger Oilers
7th title

== Qualification ==
After the regular season had ended, the two lowest ranked teams in the league and the two highest ranked teams in the 1. divisjon competed for the right to play in the 2017–18 GET-ligaen. The tournament was organized according to a double round robin format, where each club played the others twice, home and away, for a total of six games. The points system and ranking method used, was the same as in the GET-ligaen.

=== Standings ===
Updated as of March 23, 2017.

2017–18 GET-ligaen playoffs	GP	W	L	OTW	OTL	GF	GA	+/–	Pts
Manglerud Star^{q}	6	4	1	1	0	26	15	+11	14
Kongsvinger Knights^{q}	6	3	3	0	0	25	27	-2	9
Nidaros^{r}	6	2	3	0	1	19	20	-1	7
Comet^{r}	6	1	3	1	1	19	27	-8	6

q – qualified for next years GET-league; r – will play in next years 1. division

Source: hockey.no
