= Thor Martinsen =

Norwegian ice hockey player

- Born: 12 July 1945 (age 80) Halden, NOR
- Height: 5 ft 7 in (170 cm)
- Weight: 176 lb (80 kg; 12 st 8 lb)
- Position: Defence
- Shot: Right
- Played for: Frisk Asker
- National team: Norway

Thor Kristian "Mr Frisk" Martinsen (born 12 July 1945) is a Norwegian ice hockey player who played for the Norwegian national ice hockey team. He participated at the Winter Olympics in 1964, 1968, 1972 and 1980.

On 18 April 2009, he was appointed as honorary member of Frisk Tigers. He played 302 matches for the club during his career. He also played 113 national team matches, including 4 Olympic Games and 13 World Championships. He currently works in Frisk Tigers' junior sporting committee.
