= Josh Soares =

Canadian ice hockey player

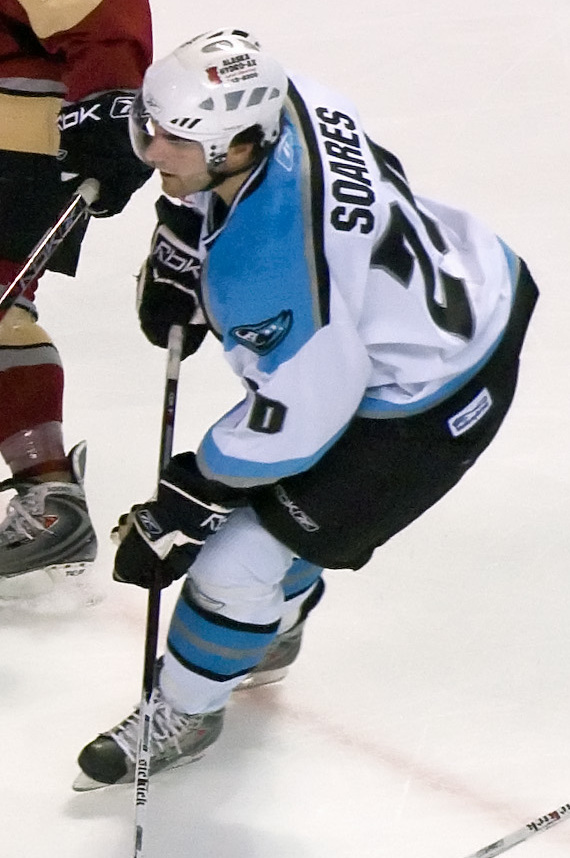
- Born: February 6, 1982 (age 44) Hamilton, Ontario, Canada
- Height: 5 ft 11 in (180 cm)
- Weight: 194 lb (88 kg; 13 st 12 lb)
- Position: Forward
- Shot: Left
- Played for: Oskarshamn; Växjö Lakers; Graz 99ers Vienna Capitals; Kassel Huskies; Chicago Wolves; Peoria Rivermen; Manitoba Moose; Alaska Aces; Stavanger Oilers; Brantford Blast; Stoney Creek Generals
- NHL draft: Undrafted
- Playing career: 2007–2020

Josh Soares (born February 6, 1982) is a Canadian former professional ice hockey forward. Before returning to Canada to play senior ice hockey, Soares had a long career in Europe, including a four-season tenure in Norway for the Stavanger Oilers, with whom he won the GET-ligaen playoffs three times, being the top scorer and elected to the all-star team in the 2015–16 season.

== Awards and honours ==
Award/honour	Year
College
Hockey East Conference champion	2003–04
NCAA Frozen Four runner-up	2003–04
All-Hockey East Second Team	2006–07
Professional
ECHL All-Rookie Team	2007–08
ECHL First All-Star Team	2007–08
GET-ligaen Champion	2014–15
GET-ligaen Champion	2015–16
GET-ligaen Top Scorer	2015–16
GET-ligaen All-Star Team	2015–16
GET-ligaen Champion	2016–17
