= Per Lundell =

Swedish ice hockey player

- Born: June 29, 1968 (age 57) Mariestad, SWE
- Height: 5 ft 10 in (178 cm)
- Weight: 190 lb (86 kg; 13 st 8 lb)
- Position: Defence
- Shot: left
- Playing career: 1987–2007

Per Lundell (born June 29, 1968 in Sweden) is a former professional Swedish ice hockey player.

== Playing career ==
He played during his career for two teams in the Swedish Elite League, Leksands IF (1987–1991, 1999–2000 and 2003–2004) and Färjestads BK (1991–1996 and 2001–2003). He also played in several other European leagues, he played in the German Deutsche Eishockey Liga for Starbulls Rosenheim (1996–1997) and for Nürnberg Ice Tigers (1998–1999 and 2000–2001), he also played in Austria for Feldkirch during the 1997–1998 and he also has played in Norway for Stjernen during the 2004–2005 season. After his time with Stjernen did he play a couple of seasons in the lower leagues in Sweden.

== Coaching career ==
Lundell started his coaching career as assistant coach for Skåre BK in 2005. After coaching in Sweden a couple of years, he was announced head coach for the Norwegian GET-league team Kongsvinger Knights before the 2015-16 season.

== Career statistics ==
			Regular season					Playoffs
Season	Team	League	GP	G	A	Pts	PIM	GP	G	A	Pts	PIM
1983–84	Mariestad BoIS HC J20	J20 Div.1	—	—	—	—	—	—	—	—	—	—
1984–85	Mariestad BoIS HC J20	Juniorserien	—	—	—	—	—	—	—	—	—	—
1984–85	Mariestad BoIS HC	Division 1	12	1	2	3	0	—	—	—	—	—
1985–86	Mariestad BoIS HC	Division 1	32	5	15	20	14	—	—	—	—	—
1986–87	Mariestad BoIS HC	Division 1	32	6	4	10	14	—	—	—	—	—
1987–88	Leksands IF J20	Juniorserien	—	—	—	—	—	—	—	—	—	—
1987–88	Leksands IF	Elitserien	21	0	1	1	8	2	0	0	0	0
1988–89	Leksands IF	Elitserien	30	2	9	11	18	9	1	2	3	4
1989–90	Leksands IF	Elitserien	36	3	19	22	14	1	0	0	0	0
1990–91	Leksands IF	Elitserien	22	2	7	9	10	—	—	—	—	—
1991–92	Färjestad BK	Elitserien	40	6	16	22	12	6	3	3	6	0
1992–93	Färjestad BK	Elitserien	38	4	9	13	40	3	0	0	0	0
1993–94	Färjestad BK	Elitserien	22	3	3	6	2	—	—	—	—	—
1993–94	Färjestad BK	Allsvenskan D1	18	0	5	5	24	3	0	1	1	2
1994–95	Färjestad BK	Elitserien	40	4	13	17	22	4	0	4	4	2
1995–96	Färjestad BK	Elitserien	40	1	8	9	14	8	2	0	2	16
1996–97	Star Bulls Rosenheim	DEL	46	6	16	22	16	3	0	0	0	0
1997–98	VEU Feldkirch	Austria	48	9	13	22	16	—	—	—	—	—
1998–99	Nürnberg Ice Tigers	DEL	49	2	13	15	20	13	0	2	2	2
1999–00	Leksands IF	Elitserien	46	12	12	24	10	—	—	—	—	—
2000–01	Nürnberg Ice Tigers	DEL	54	7	19	26	10	4	1	0	1	0
2001–02	Färjestad BK	Elitserien	31	5	10	15	14	10	1	8	9	0
2001–02	Grums IK	Division 1	5	3	3	6	—	—	—	—	—	—
2002–03	Färjestad BK	Elitserien	48	3	12	15	26	14	1	0	1	4
2003–04	Leksands IF	Elitserien	50	6	6	12	12	—	—	—	—	—
2004–05	Stjernen Hockey	Norway	36	3	12	15	6	7	0	2	2	2
2005–06	Skåre BK	Division 1	28	5	14	19	20	—	—	—	—	—
2006–07	Skåre BK	Division 1	1	0	1	1	0	—	—	—	—	—
Elitserien totals			464	51	125	176	202	57	8	17	25	26
DEL totals			149	15	48	63	46	20	1	2	3	2
