= 2017–18 GET-ligaen season =

- League: (Norway) GET-ligaen
- Sport: Ice hockey
- Duration: September 2017 – mid April 2018
- Games: 45
- Teams: 10
- TV partner: TV 2 Sport

Regular season
- League champions: Storhamar

Playoffs
- Norwegian champions: Storhamar

GET-ligaen seasons
- 2016–17 2018–19

The 2017–18 GET-ligaen was the 79th season of Norway's premier ice hockey league, GET-ligaen.

The regular season began in September 2017. There was no team changes from the 2016–17 season.

== Participating teams ==
GET-ligaen teams

Team	City	Arena	Capacity
Frisk Asker	Asker	Askerhallen	2,400
Kongsvinger Knights	Kongsvinger	Kongsvinger Ishall	2,000
Lillehammer IK	Lillehammer	Kristins Hall; Håkons Hall	3,194; 11,500
Lørenskog IK	Lørenskog	Lørenskog Ishall	2,400
Manglerud Star	Oslo	Manglerudhallen	2,000
Sparta Warriors	Sarpsborg	Sparta Amfi	3,450
Stavanger Oilers	Stavanger	DNB Arena	4,377
Stjernen	Fredrikstad	Stjernehallen	2,473
Storhamar	Hamar	CC Amfi	7,000
Vålerenga	Oslo	Furuset Forum; Gjøvik Olympic Cavern Hall	2,050; 5,830

== Arenas ==
On the season opener September 8, Vålerenga Ishockey played Storhamar Hockey in Gjøvik Olympic Cavern Hall.

Since Nye Jordal Amfi will not be completed until the 2019–20 season, Vålerenga used Furuset Forum as a temporary arena the whole season. Previous to Vålerengas match against Storhamar November 13, Furuset Forums capacity was 1,450.

Lillehammer returned to Håkons Hall on November 18, when they met Storhamar in front of a crowd of 10,031 people, which was new indoor attendance record for a Norwegian league match.

== Regular season standings ==
Updated as of February 28, 2018.

2017–18 GET-ligaen season	GP	W	L	OTW	OTL	GF	GA	+/–	Pts
Storhamar^{y}	45	35	7	0	3	183	88	95	108
Sparta Warriors^{x}	45	25	10	8	2	152	109	43	93
Lillehammer^{x}	45	24	11	6	4	171	123	48	88
Frisk Asker^{x}	45	24	13	4	4	159	120	39	84
Vålerenga^{x}	45	18	17	5	5	144	132	12	69
Stavanger Oilers^{x}	45	16	16	4	9	129	121	8	65
Manglerud Star^{x}	45	15	21	4	5	132	154	-22	58
Lørenskog^{x}	45	11	25	4	5	118	165	-47	46
Stjernen^{r}	45	9	25	6	5	96	144	-48	44
Kongsvinger Knights^{r}	45	3	35	4	3	90	218	-128	20

x – clinched playoff spot; y – clinched regular season league title; r – play in relegation series

Source: hockey.no

== Statistics ==
=== Scoring leaders ===
List shows the ten best skaters based on the number of points during the regular season. If two or more skaters are tied (i.e. same number of points, goals and played games), all of the tied skaters are shown. Updated as of February 27, 2018.

GP = Games played; G = Goals; A = Assists; Pts = Points; +/– = Plus/Minus; PIM = Penalty Minutes

Player	Team	GP	G	A	Pts	+/–	PIM
(Canada) Garry Nunn	Frisk Asker	45	24	38	62	+22	32
(Sweden) Tobias Lindström	Vålerenga	44	28	33	61	+12	36
(Sweden) Rasmus Ahlholm	Vålerenga	45	26	34	60	+2	10
(Canada) David Morley	Lillehammer	45	22	38	60	+6	44
(Canada) Stephan Vigier	Lillehammer	45	27	29	56	+3	57
(Norway) Niklas Roest	Sparta Warriors	43	15	37	52	+27	59
(United States) Joey Benik	Lillehammer	39	23	26	49	+16	16
(Canada) Taylor Foster	Frisk Asker	45	23	25	48	+13	8
(Canada) Brett Cameron	Lillehammer	45	24	24	48	+7	69
(Norway) Joakim Jensen	Storhamar Dragons	40	21	26	47	+39	22
(Canada) Troy Rutkowski	Sparta Warriors	45	20	27	47	+12	24

Source: hockey.no

=== Leading goaltenders ===
The top five goaltenders based on goals against average. Updated as of June 8, 2017.

Player	Team	GP	TOI	W	L	GA	SO	Sv%	GAA

Source: hockey.no

=== Attendance ===
Team	Arena	Capacity	Total	Games	Average	% of Capacity
Frisk Asker	Askerhallen	2,400				
Stavanger Oilers	DNB Arena	4,377	91,088	25	3,644	83,2
Storhamar Hockey	Hamar OL-Amfi	7,000	137,307	30	4,577	65,3
Vålerenga	Furuset Forum	2,050	32,048	25	1,282	
Kongsvinger Knights	Kongsvinger Ishall	2,000				
Lillehammer	Kristins Hall	3,194	59,814	30	1,994	62,4
Lørenskog	Lørenskog Ishall	1,350				
Manglerud Star	Manglerudhallen	2,000				
Sparta Warriors	Sparta Amfi	4,000				
Stjernen	Stjernehallen	2,473				

Source:hockey.no

== Coaching changes ==
Coaching changes
Offseason
Team	2016–17 coach	2017–18 coach	Story / Accomplishments
Storhamar Hockey	Sjur Robert Nilsen	Fredrik Söderström	On March 17, 2017, Sjur Robert Nilsen left Storhamar after his team was eliminated from the playoffs by Sparta Warriors. On April 28, Fredrik Söderström was named as the new head coach. He had previously coached IK Oskarshamn in Sweden.
Sparta Warriors	Lenny Eriksson	Sjur Robert Nilsen	On March 25, 2017. Lenny Eriksson resigned as heach coach. On April 10, he was replaced by Sjur Robert Nilsen.
Stjernen	Jarmo Tolvanen	Leif Strömberg	On April 28, 2017, Stjernen recruited Leif Strömberg as new head coach. He replaced Jarmo Tolvanen.
Kongsvinger Knights	Janne Saavalainen*; Anders Angelbrant	Ed Galiani	On May 29, 2017, Kongsvinger hired Ed Galiani as their new head coach. He replaced Anders Angelbrant, who had been interim head coach since Janne Saavalainen left in January 2017.

== Playoffs ==
After the regular season, the top eight teams qualified for the playoffs. In the first and second rounds, the highest remaining seed chose which of the two lowest remaining seeds to be matched against. In each round the higher-seeded team was awarded home ice advantage. Each best-of-seven series followed a 1–1–1–1–1–1–1 format: the higher-seeded team played at home for games 1 and 3 (plus 5 and 7 if necessary), and the lower-seeded team at home for games 2, 4 and 6 (if necessary).

=== Bracket ===
Updated as of April 11, 2018.

Quarter-finals
1	Storhamar	4
8	Lørenskog	0
2	Sparta Warriors	4
7	Manglerud Star	2
(Pairings are reseeded after the first round)
3	Lillehammer	4
5	Vålerenga	1
4	Frisk Asker	4
6	Stavanger Oilers	1

Semi-finals
1	Storhamar	4
4	Frisk Asker	1
2	Sparta Warriors	0
3	Lillehammer	4

Finals
1	Storhamar	4
3	Lillehammer	1

Source: hockey.no

Norwegian Champions
2018
Storhamar
7th title

== Qualification ==
After the regular season had ended, the two lowest ranked teams in the league and the two highest ranked teams in the 1. divisjon competed for the right to play in the 2018–19 GET-ligaen. The tournament was organized according to a double round robin format, where each club played the others twice, home and away, for a total of six games. The points system and ranking method used, was the same as in the GET-ligaen.

=== Standings ===
Updated as of March 22, 2018.

2017–18 GET-ligaen playoffs	GP	W	L	OTW	OTL	GF	GA	+/–	Pts
Stjernen^{q}	6	5	0	1	0	34	19	15	17
Ringerike Panthers^{q}	6	3	2	0	1	20	18	2	10
Narvik^{r}	6	2	3	1	0	17	20	-3	8
Kongsvinger Knights^{r}	6	0	5	0	1	9	23	-14	1

q – qualified for next years GET-league; r – will play in next years 1. division

Source: hockey.no

== Awards ==
All-Star team

The following players were selected to the 2017–18 GET-ligaen All-Star team:

- Goaltender: Christoffer Bengtsberg (Lillehammer)
- Defenseman: Kodie Curran (Storhamar)
- Defenseman: Troy Rutkowski (Sparta)
- Center: Tobias Lindström (Vålerenga)
- Winger: David Morley (Lillehammer)
- Winger: Gary Nunn (Frisk Asker)

Other

- Coach of the year: David Livingston (Manglerud Star)
- Rookie of the year: Jacob Lundell Noer (Lillehammer)
