= Morten Johansen =

Norwegian ice hockey player

- Born: 25 December 1952 Norway
- Played for: Norwegian Olympics ice hockey team
- NHL draft: Undrafted

Morten Johansen (born 25 December 1952) is a Norwegian ice hockey player. He played for the Norwegian national ice hockey team, and participated at the Winter Olympics in 1980. He was awarded Gullpucken as best Norwegian ice hockey player in 1975.
