= 1972–73 Norwegian 1. Divisjon season =

Norwegian ice hockey league season

The 1972–73 Norwegian 1. Divisjon season was the 34th season of ice hockey in Norway. Eight teams participated in the league, and Valerenga Ishockey won the championship.

== First round ==
	Club	GP	W	T	L	GF–GA	Pts
1.	Hasle-Løren Idrettslag	14	13	1	0	110:30	27
2.	Vålerenga Ishockey	14	11	2	1	93:42	24
3.	Frisk Asker	14	8	1	5	68:43	17
4.	Jar IL	14	8	0	6	70:61	16
5.	Allianseidrettslaget Skeid	14	5	1	8	52:74	11
6.	Forward Flyers	14	5	0	9	68:74	10
7.	Grüner/Hugin	14	3	1	10	46:97	7
8.	Lambertseter	14	0	0	14	29:115	0

== Second round ==
=== Final round ===
	Club	GP	W	T	L	GF–GA	Pts
1.	Vålerenga Ishockey	6	5	0	1	34:13	10
2.	Jar IL	6	3	0	3	21:33	6
3.	Hasle-Løren Idrettslag	6	2	0	4	33:28	4
4.	Frisk Asker	6	2	0	4	20:34	4

=== Relegation round ===
	Club	GP	W	T	L	GF–GA	Pts
5.	Forward Flyers	6	4	0	2	38:16	8
6.	Allianseidrettslaget Skeid	6	4	0	2	28:25	8
7.	Grüner/Hugin	6	3	1	2	23:18	7
8.	Lambertseter	6	0	1	5	8:38	1
