= 2019–20 GET-ligaen season =

- League: (Norway) GET-ligaen
- Sport: Ice hockey
- Duration: 12 September 2019 – 7 March 2020
- Number of teams: 10
- TV partner(s): TV 2 Sport

Regular season
- League champions: Stavanger Oilers (5th title)

Eliteserien seasons
- ← 2018–19 2020–21 →

The 2019–20 GET-ligaen was the 81st season of Norway's premier ice hockey league, Eliteserien, and the last under the sponsorship name GET-ligaen. The play-offs were cancelled due to the COVID-19 pandemic.

== Participating teams ==
Fjordkraftligaen teams

Team	City	Arena	Capacity
Frisk Asker	Asker	Askerhallen	2,400
Grüner	Oslo	Grünerhallen	500
Lillehammer IK	Lillehammer	Eidsiva Arena	3,197
Manglerud Star	Oslo	Manglerudhallen	1,050
Narvik	Narvik	Nordkraft Arena	1,400
Sparta Warriors	Sarpsborg	Sparta Amfi	3,450
Stavanger Oilers	Stavanger	DNB Arena	4,377
Stjernen	Fredrikstad	Stjernehallen	2,473
Storhamar	Hamar	CC Amfi	7,000
Vålerenga	Oslo	Nye Jordal Amfi	5,300

== Regular season ==
=== Standings ===
Pos	Team	Pld	W	OTW	OTL	L	GF	GA	GD	Pts
1	Stavanger Oilers (C)	45	34	4	3	4	194	90	+104	113
2	Storhamar	45	26	4	4	11	179	111	+68	90
3	Vålerenga	45	22	4	3	16	125	107	+18	77
4	Frisk Asker	45	24	1	2	18	135	125	+10	76
5	Lillehammer	45	23	0	7	15	158	131	+27	76
6	Sparta Warriors	45	18	5	2	20	144	130	+14	66
7	Stjernen	45	19	3	1	22	150	148	+2	61 (Note: Stjernen have been deducted 3 points.)
8	Manglerud Star	45	15	3	1	26	112	148	−36	49 (Note: Manglerud Star have been deducted 3 points.)
9	Narvik	45	11	4	4	26	123	183	−60	45
10	Grüner	45	5	0	1	39	94	241	−147	16

Source: Hockey.no
Rules for classification: 1) Points; 2) Head-to-head points.
(C) Champion
