= 2015–16 GET-ligaen season =

- League: (Norway) GET-ligaen
- Sport: Ice hockey
- Duration: 12 September 2015 – 22 April 2016
- Games: 45
- Teams: 10
- TV partner: TV 2 Sport

Regular season
- League champions: Stavanger Oilers

Playoffs
- Norwegian champions: Stavanger Oilers

GET-ligaen seasons
- 2014–15 2016–17

The 2015–16 GET-ligaen was the 77th and season of Norway's premier ice hockey league, Eliteserien (known as GET-ligaen for sponsorship reasons).

The regular season began play on September 12, 2015, and was concluded on March 8, 2016.

The playoffs to determine the 2016 Norwegian Ice Hockey Champions began March 11, and ended 22 April 2016.

== Participating teams ==
GET-ligaen teams

Team	City	Arena	Capacity
Frisk Asker Tigers	Asker	Askerhallen	2,400
Kongsvinger Knights	Kongsvinger	Kongsvinger Ishall	2,000
Lillehammer IK	Lillehammer	Kristins Hall	3,194
Lørenskog IK	Lørenskog	Lørenskog Ishall	2,400
Manglerud Star	Oslo	Manglerudhallen	2,000
Sparta Warriors	Sarpsborg	Sparta Amfi	3,450
Stavanger Oilers	Stavanger	DNB Arena	4,377
Stjernen	Fredrikstad	Stjernehallen	2,473
Storhamar	Hamar	CC Amfi	6,091
Vålerenga	Oslo	Jordal Amfi	4,450

== Regular season ==
=== Standings ===
Updated as of March 8, 2016.

2015–16 GET-ligaen season	GP	W	L	OTW	OTL	GF	GA	+/–	Pts
Stavanger Oilers^{y}	45	29	6	2	8	181	82	+99	99
Lørenskog^{x}	45	29	11	3	2	162	106	+56	95
Frisk Asker Tigers^{x}	45	24	12	5	4	139	105	+34	86
Sparta Warriors^{x}	45	24	12	5	4	172	138	+34	86
Vålerenga^{x}	45	21	16	6	2	122	98	+24	77
Storhamar^{x}	45	22	17	2	4	146	111	+35	74
Stjernen^{x}	45	15	21	4	5	145	164	-19	58
Manglerud Star^{x}	45	11	27	3	4	109	175	-66	43
Lillehammer^{r}	45	9	27	6	3	118	157	-39	42
Kongsvinger Knights^{r}	45	4	39	1	1	67	225	-158	15

x – clinched playoff spot; y – clinched regular season league title; r – play in relegation series

Source: pointstreak.com

=== Statistics ===
==== Scoring leaders ====
List shows the ten best skaters based on the number of points during the regular season. If two or more skaters are tied (i.e. same number of points, goals and played games), all of the tied skaters are shown. Updated as of March 8, 2016.

GP = Games played; G = Goals; A = Assists; Pts = Points; +/– = Plus/Minus; PIM = Penalty Minutes

Player	Team	GP	G	A	Pts	+/–	PIM
(Canada) Josh Soares	Stavanger Oilers	44	21	46	67	+28	75
(Canada) Dion Knelsen	Sparta Warriors	44	30	34	64	+18	10
(Sweden) Jacob Berglund	Storhamar	43	24	32	56	+30	28
(United States) Tony Romano	Lørenskog	39	17	38	55	+23	55
(Canada) Curtis Gedig	Stjernen	43	26	26	52	-9	40
(Canada) Nathan Longpre	Lørenskog	42	14	35	49	+26	26
(Canada) Jeff Jubinville	Sparta Warriors	36	16	32	48	+7	10
(United States) Dan Kissel	Stavanger Oilers	37	15	33	48	+28	12
(Sweden) David Hallström	Stjernen	40	23	23	46	+13	12
(Sweden) Niklas Bröms	Stjernen	45	12	34	46	-6	30

Source: pointstreak.com

==== Leading goaltenders ====
The top five goaltenders based on goals against average. Updated as of March 8, 2016.

Player	Team	GP	TOI	W	L	GA	SO	Sv%	GAA
(Norway) Henrik Holm	Stavanger Oilers	33	1876:39	21	11	58	5	.927	1.85
(Norway) Steffen Søberg	Vålerenga	43	2605:21	26	17	94	2	.924	2.16
(Sweden) Oskar Östlund	Storhamar	29	1710:05	16	11	62	6	.919	2.18
(Sweden) Nicklas Dahlberg	Frisk Asker Tigers	40	2417:30	25	15	91	3	.925	2.26
(United States) Jeff Jakaitis	Lørenskog	40	2389:16	27	13	98	6	.908	2.46

Source: pointstreak.com

==== Attendance ====
Team	Arena	Capacity	Total	Games	Average	% of Capacity
Frisk Tigers	Askerhallen	2,400				
Stavanger Oilers	DNB Arena	4,377				
Storhamar Dragons	Hamar OL-Amfi	6,091				
Vålerenga	Jordal Amfi	4,450				
Kongsvinger Knights	Kongsvinger Ishall	2,000				
Lillehammer	Kristins Hall	3,194				
Lørenskog	Lørenskog Ishall	1,350				
Manglerud Star	Manglerudhallen	2,000				
Sparta Warriors	Sparta Amfi	3,450				
Stjernen	Stjernehallen	2,473				

Source:pointstreak.com

== Playoffs ==
After the regular season, the top eight teams qualified for the playoffs. In the first and second rounds, the highest remaining seed chose which of the two lowest remaining seeds to be matched against. In each round the higher-seeded team was awarded home ice advantage. Each best-of-seven series followed a 1–1–1–1–1–1–1 format: the higher-seeded team played at home for games 1 and 3 (plus 5 and 7 if necessary), and the lower-seeded team at home for games 2, 4 and (if necessary) 6.

=== Bracket ===
Updated as of April 22, 2016.

Quarter-finals
1	Stavanger Oilers	4
8	Manglerud Star	0
2	Lørenskog	4
7	Stjernen	2
(Pairings are reseeded after the first round)
3	Frisk Asker Tigers	2
5	Vålerenga	4
4	Sparta Warriors	2
6	Storhamar	4

Semi-finals
1	Stavanger Oilers	4
6	Storhamar	3
2	Lørenskog	4
5	Vålerenga	1

Finals
1	Stavanger Oilers	4
2	Lørenskog	2

Source: pointstreak.com

Norwegian Champions
2016
Stavanger Oilers
6th title

== Qualification ==
After the regular season has ended, the two lowest ranked teams in the league and the two highest ranked teams in the 2015–16 1. division competed for the right to play in the 2016–17 GET-ligaen. The tournament was organized according to a double round robin format, where each club played the others twice, home and away, for a total of six games. The points system and ranking method used, was the same as in the GET-ligaen.

=== Standings ===
Updated as of March 22, 2016.

2016–17 GET-ligaen playoffs	GP	W	L	OTW	OTL	GF	GA	+/–	Pts
Lillehammer^{q}	6	5	1	0	0	26	7	+19	15
Kongsvinger Knights^{q}	6	3	2	1	0	24	18	+6	11
Tønsberg Vikings^{r}	6	2	3	0	1	14	21	-7	7
Bergen^{r}	6	1	5	0	0	19	37	-18	3

q – qualified for next years GET-league; r – will play in next years 1. division

Source: hockey.no

== Awards ==
All-Star team

The following players were selected to the 2015–16 GET-ligaen All-Star team:

- Goaltender: Nicklas Dahlberg (Frisk)
- Defenseman: Curtis Gedig (Stjernen)
- Defenseman: Stefan Espeland (Lørenskog)
- Center: Josh Soares (Stavanger)
- Winger: Dion Knelsen (Sparta)
- Winger: Jacob Berglund (Storhamar)

Other

- Coach of the year: Sune Bergman (Frisk)
- Rookie of the year: Johannes Johannessen (Stavanger)
