= Nicklas Dahlberg =

Swedish ice hockey player

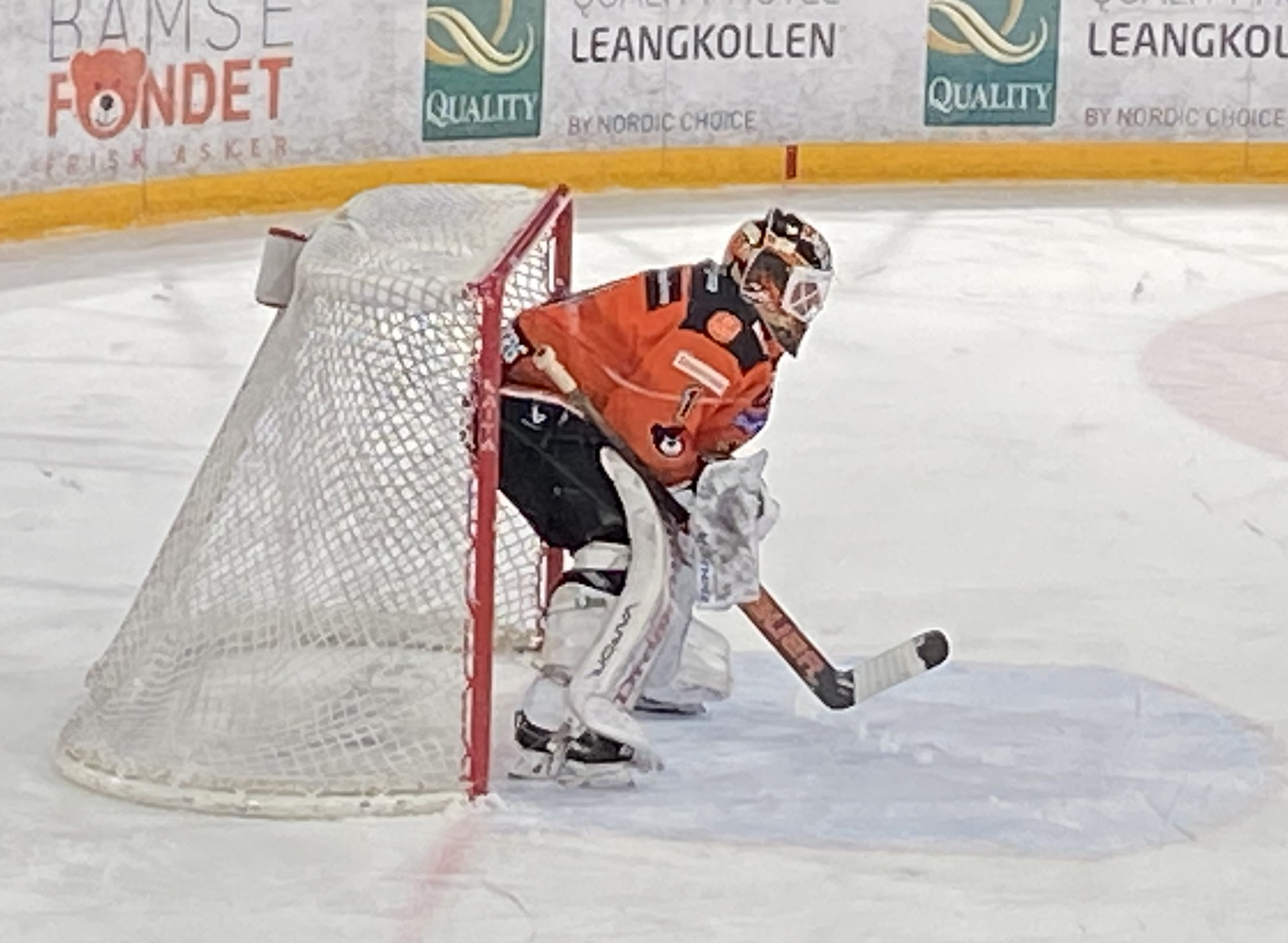
- Born: April 20, 1985 (age 41) Danderyd, Sweden
- Height: 5 ft 11 in (180 cm)
- Weight: 179 lb (81 kg; 12 st 11 lb)
- Position: Goaltender
- Caught: Left
- Played for: Skellefteå AIK; MoDo Hockey; Frisk Asker
- Playing career: 2006–2023

Nicklas Dahlberg (born April 20, 1985 in Danderyd) is a Swedish former professional ice hockey Goaltender. He last played with Frisk Asker of the Norwegian GET-ligaen. He was influential when Skellefteå AIK surprisingly fended off Linköping in the 2009 playoff quarter finals, stopping more than 60 shots in the final match.
