= Sune Bergman =

Swedish ice hockey player and manager (1952–2021)

- Born: 5 December 1952 Kramfors, Sweden
- Died: 30 August 2021 (aged 68)
- Position: Goaltender
- Played for: Kramfors IF; Kramforsalliansen; Boro/Vetlanda HC; IF Troja-Ljungby; IF Sundsvall Hockey
- Playing career: 1975–1988

Sune Bergman (5 December 1952 – 30 August 2021) was a Swedish ice hockey player and manager. As the coach of HV71, he led them to their first Swedish Championship, the 1995 Swedish national championship.
