= Furuset Forum =

Indoor sports arena in Oslo, Norway

Coordinates: 59°56′24.71″N 10°53′48.43″E

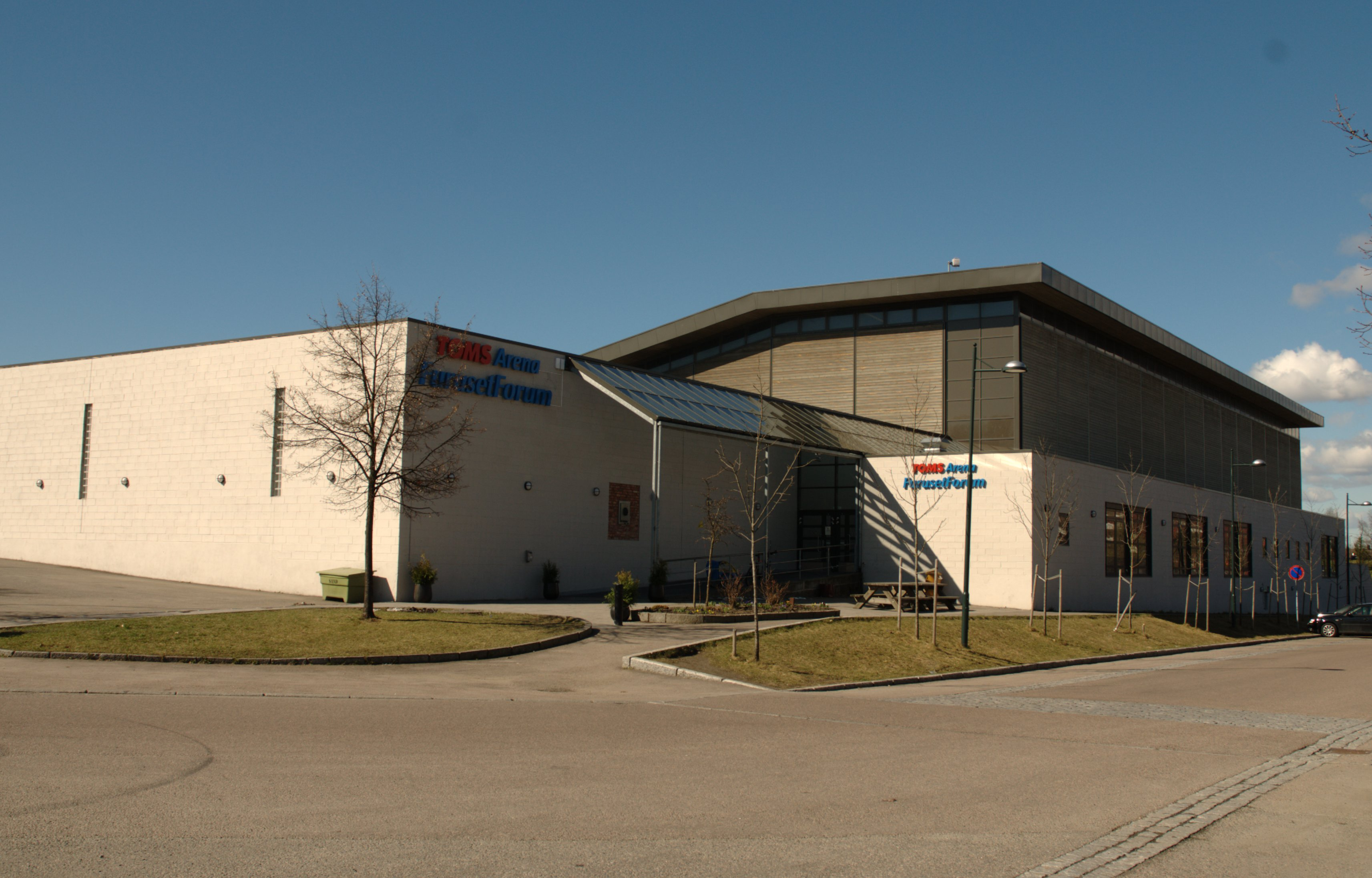
- Interactive map of Furuset Forum
- Location: Oslo, Norway
- Capacity: 2,050
- Public transit: Metro: Furuset stasjon Bus: Line 25, 64A, 64B, 65, 79, 102, 401, N2

Construction
- Opened: 1998

Tenants
- Furuset Ishockey (1998-present); Vålerenga Ishockey (2017-2019)

Furuset Forum is an indoor sports arena located in the eastern parts of Oslo, Norway. The capacity of the arena is 2,050 and was opened 1998, replacing the earlier arena, which was built in 1979. Its main focus is ice hockey, but also regular indoor sports facilities currently utilized by Handball, Floorball and more.

Located in Søren Bulls vei, it is within proximity of the underground trains. The facility is also equipped with three dedicated parking spots for people with disabilities and has a cafeteria where traditional Norwegian waffles and soft drinks can be purchased. It is the home of Furuset ice hockey team, the club behind names like Bjørn "Botta" Skaare, Petter Sæther and Jon Warset.

During the construction of Nye Jordal Amfi, Vålerenga Ishockey will be using Furuset Forum as their temporary home arena. Due to this, the capacity of the arena was expanded, from 1450 to 2050.
