= Askerhallen =

Ice hockey arena in Asker, Norway

Coordinates: 59°49′32.86″N 10°26′50.01″E

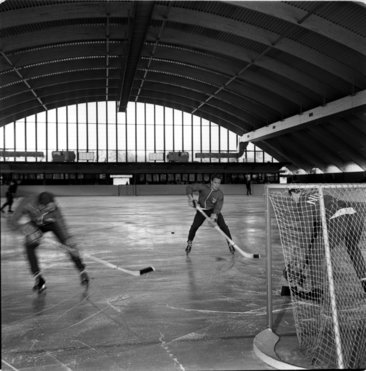
From the first years

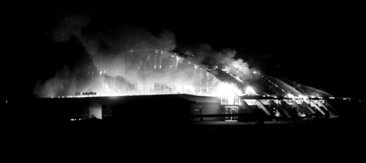
The 1972 fire

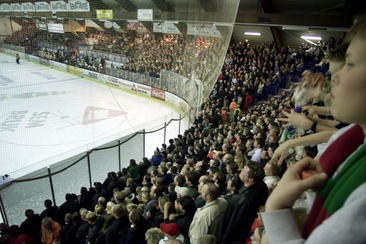
From the 2002 play-offs final

Askerhallen is an indoor ice hockey arena located in Asker, Norway. The capacity of the arena is 2,400 and was opened in 1969. It is the home arena of Frisk Tigers ice hockey team and the juniors of Frisk Asker.

In 1969, Norway's fourth indoor ice hockey rink was opened in Asker, the first of its kind in the Oslo area. Farmer Bjørn Mortensen wished to give something back to the community, and came to agreement with the local municipality to build Askerhallen. The arena was damaged in a fire in 1972, but it was quickly rebuilt and re-opened for the 1972–73 season.

The arena's appearance is much the same today as it was back then, apart from the installation of new seating, VIP and press boxes.
