= Manglerudhallen =

Indoor arena in Manglerud, Oslo, Norway

- Garasjen
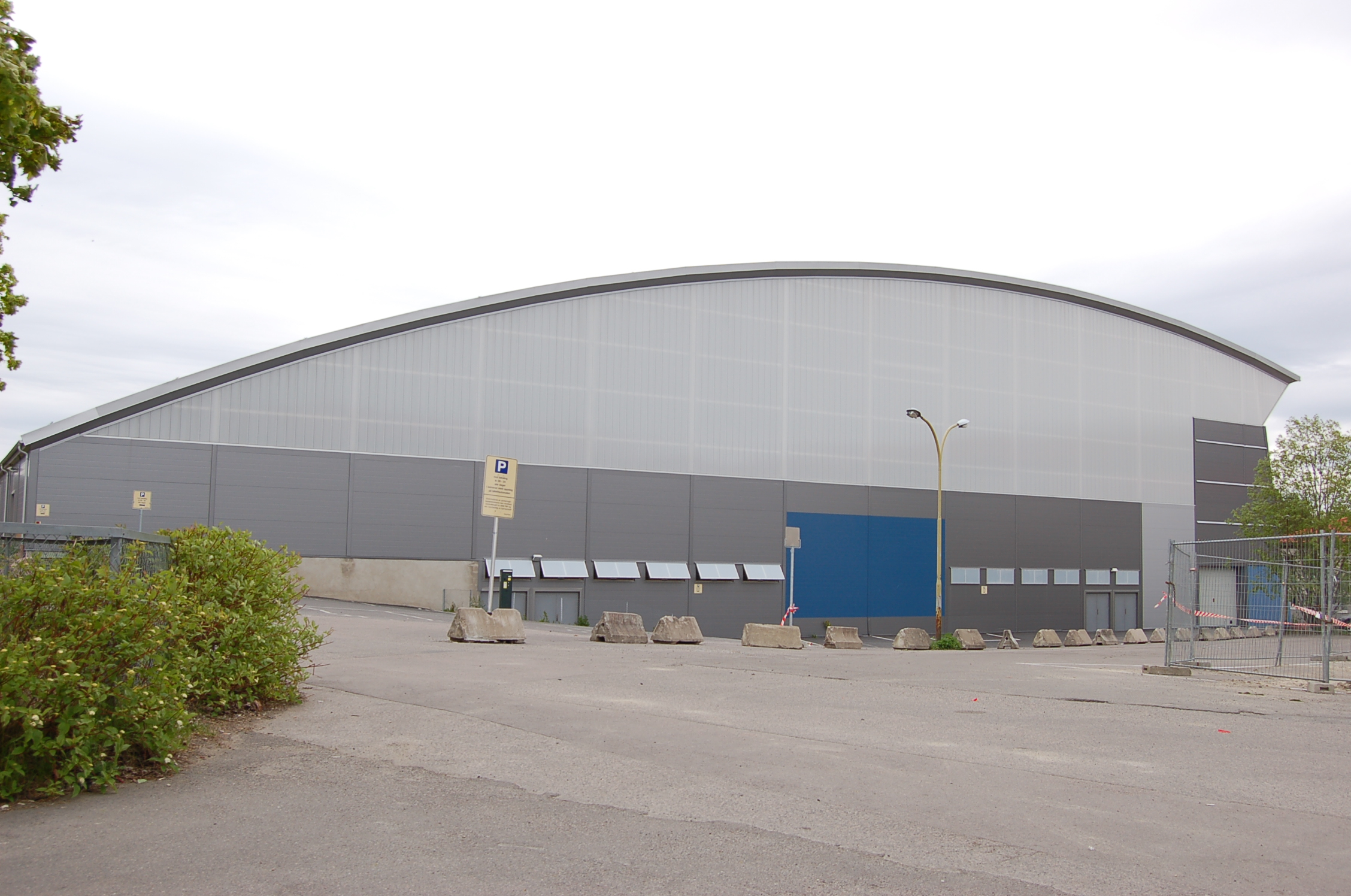
- Interactive map of Manglerudhallen
- Location: Manglerud, Oslo, Norway
- Coordinates: 59.89552°N 10.82587°E
- Owner: Oslo Kommune
- Capacity: 2,000
- Surface: Ice / Artificial turf
- Public transit: Metro: Manglerud stasjon Bus: Line 78A, 78B

Construction
- Opened: 1979
- Renovated: 2004, 2016

Tenant
- Manglerud Star Ishockey

Manglerudhallen is the name of two arenas, an indoor ice hockey arena and a multi-purpose indoor arena, located in Manglerud, Oslo, Norway. The capacity of the ice hockey arena is 2,000 and it was opened in 1979. It is the home arena of the Manglerud Star ice hockey team.
