= Stjernehallen =

Indoor ice hockey arena in Fredrikstad, Norway

Coordinates: 59.2257°N 10.9456°E

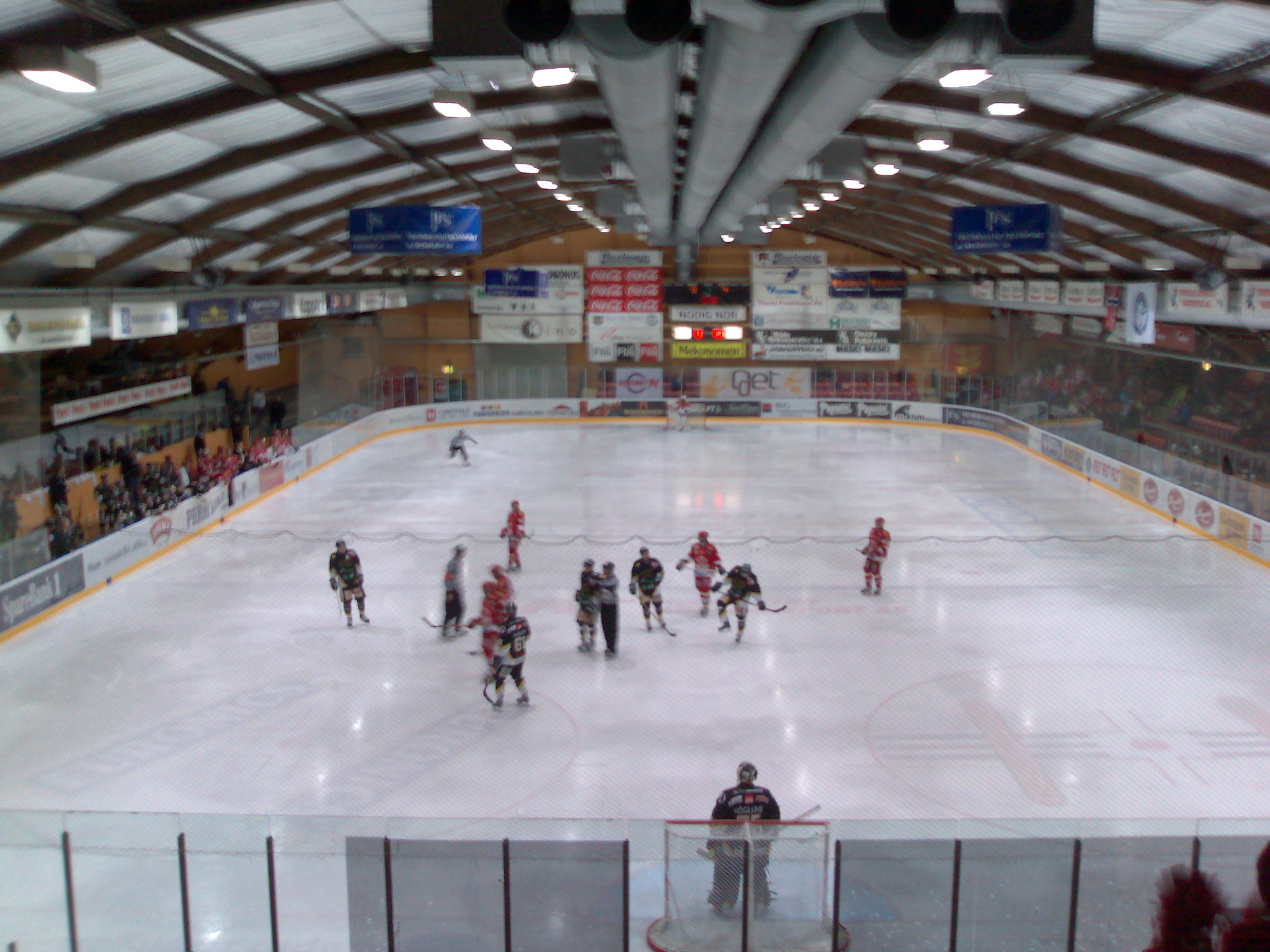
Stjernehallen during the match Stjernen vs Stavanger Oilers, 30 December 2007

Stjernehallen is an indoor ice hockey arena located in Fredrikstad, Norway. The capacity of the arena is 2,473 and was opened in 1970. It is the home arena of Stjernen ice hockey team.
