= Anders Bastiansen =

Norwegian ice hockey player (born 1980)

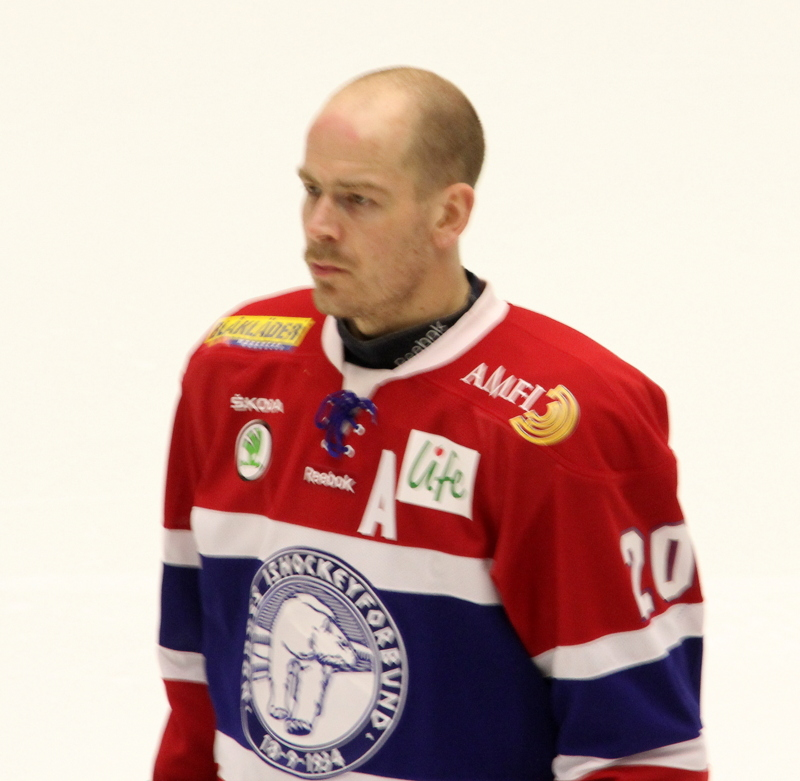
- Anders Bastiansen playing for Team Norway in April 2013
- Born: October 31, 1980 (age 44); Oslo, Norway
- Height: 6 ft 3 in (191 cm)
- Weight: 205 lb (93 kg; 14 st 9 lb)
- Position: Centre
- Shot: Left
- GET team Former teams: Frisk Asker; Mora IK; Färjestads BK; Graz 99ers
- National team: Norway
- Playing career: 1997–2023

Anders Bastiansen (born October 31, 1980) is a Norwegian former professional ice hockey forward he played for the Frisk Asker of the Norwegian GET-ligaen and was an established member and Captain of the Norwegian National Team.

== Playing career ==
Bastiansen began his professional career in his native Norway, with Frisk Asker of the GET-ligaen. After eight seasons within Asker, Bastiansen left for Sweden to play professionally for the next 10 seasons. Over his career in Sweden he was awarded the Golden Puck by the Norwegian Ice Hockey Federation after the 2006–07 season when he was with Mora IK.

Prior to the 2008–09 season he signed with Färjestad of the Swedish Elitserien.

On July 24, 2014, after six seasons with Farjestad, Bastiansen left as a free agent to sign a one-year contract with Austrian club, Graz 99ers of the EBEL.

After 11 seasons abroad, Bastiansen announced that he was returning home to Norway with home team, Frisk Asker.

== International play ==
Between 2006 and 2015, Batiansen have represented the Norwegian national team in 10 World Championships, and 2 Olympic Games.

== Career statistics ==
=== Regular season and playoffs ===
			Regular season					Playoffs
Season	Team	League	GP	G	A	Pts	PIM	GP	G	A	Pts	PIM
1996–97	Frisk Asker	NOR	2	0	0	0	2	—	—	—	—	—
1997–98	Frisk Asker	NOR	21	1	2	3	8	—	—	—	—	—
1998–99	Frisk Asker	NOR	31	3	5	8	14	—	—	—	—	—
1999–2000	Frisk Asker	NOR	29	8	7	15	31	—	—	—	—	—
2000–01	Frisk Asker	NOR	32	7	14	21	47	—	—	—	—	—
2001–02	Frisk Asker	NOR	39	8	15	23	42	—	—	—	—	—
2002–03	Frisk Asker	NOR	35	9	11	20	36	—	—	—	—	—
2003–04	Frisk Asker	NOR	38	11	18	29	73	—	—	—	—	—
2004–05	IFK Arboga	Allsv	42	20	29	49	62	6	1	5	6	8
2005–06	Almtuna IS	Allsv	13	5	5	10	8	—	—	—	—	—
2005–06	Mora IK	SEL	32	7	5	12	20	5	0	0	0	2
2006–07	Mora IK	SEL	55	7	24	31	58	4	1	2	3	0
2007–08	Mora IK	SEL	55	7	23	30	58	—	—	—	—	—
2008–09	Färjestad BK	SEL	54	10	22	32	16	13	2	8	10	12
2009–10	Färjestad BK	SEL	55	8	11	19	26	7	1	0	1	10
2010–11	Färjestad BK	SEL	51	6	12	18	30	14	6	2	8	12
2011–12	Färjestad BK	SEL	52	8	14	22	18	11	1	4	5	6
2012–13	Färjestad BK	SEL	53	5	5	10	38	10	3	0	3	6
2013–14	Färjestad BK	SEL	36	2	5	7	12	15	1	2	3	6
2014–15	Graz99ers	AUT	54	15	13	28	22	—	—	—	—	—
2015–16	Frisk Asker	NOR	45	11	33	44	34	6	3	5	8	6
2016–17	Frisk Asker	NOR	45	17	27	44	48	17	7	5	12	6
2017–18	Frisk Asker	NOR	44	14	29	43	18	10	2	2	4	10
2018–19	Frisk Asker	NOR	47	14	25	39	54	19	1	9	10	8
2019–20	Frisk Asker	NOR	45	11	27	38	10	—	—	—	—	—
2020–21	Frisk Asker	NOR	23	2	11	13	8	—	—	—	—	—
2021–22	Frisk Asker	NOR	44	6	21	27	18	6	1	0	1	0
NOR totals			520	122	245	367	443	58	14	21	35	30
SEL totals			443	60	121	181	276	79	15	18	33	54

=== International ===
Year	Team	Event	GP	G	A	Pts	PIM
1997	Norway	EJC B	6	1	4	5	35
1998	Norway	EJC	6	2	1	3	35
1999	Norway	WJC B	6	0	3	3	26
2000	Norway	WJC B	2	1	1	2	8
2005	Norway	OGQ	6	1	3	4	2
2005	Norway	WC D1	5	5	5	10	0
2006	Norway	WC	6	0	2	2	4
2007	Norway	WC	6	4	1	5	4
2008	Norway	WC	7	1	5	6	4
2009	Norway	OGQ	3	0	0	0	2
2009	Norway	WC	6	2	1	3	0
2010	Norway	OG	4	1	0	1	4
2010	Norway	WC	6	3	1	4	4
2011	Norway	WC	7	3	4	7	4
2012	Norway	WC	8	1	4	5	8
2013	Norway	WC	7	4	1	5	0
2014	Norway	OG	3	0	0	0	0
2014	Norway	WC	7	2	0	2	4
2015	Norway	WC	7	1	0	1	0
2016	Norway	WC	6	0	0	0	4
2016	Norway	OGQ	3	1	1	2	0
2017	Norway	WC	7	1	0	1	2
2018	Norway	OG	5	0	2	2	0
2018	Norway	WC	7	2	1	3	0
Junior totals			20	4	9	13	104
Senior totals			116	32	31	63	46
