= Mads Hansen (ice hockey) =

Norwegian ice hockey player

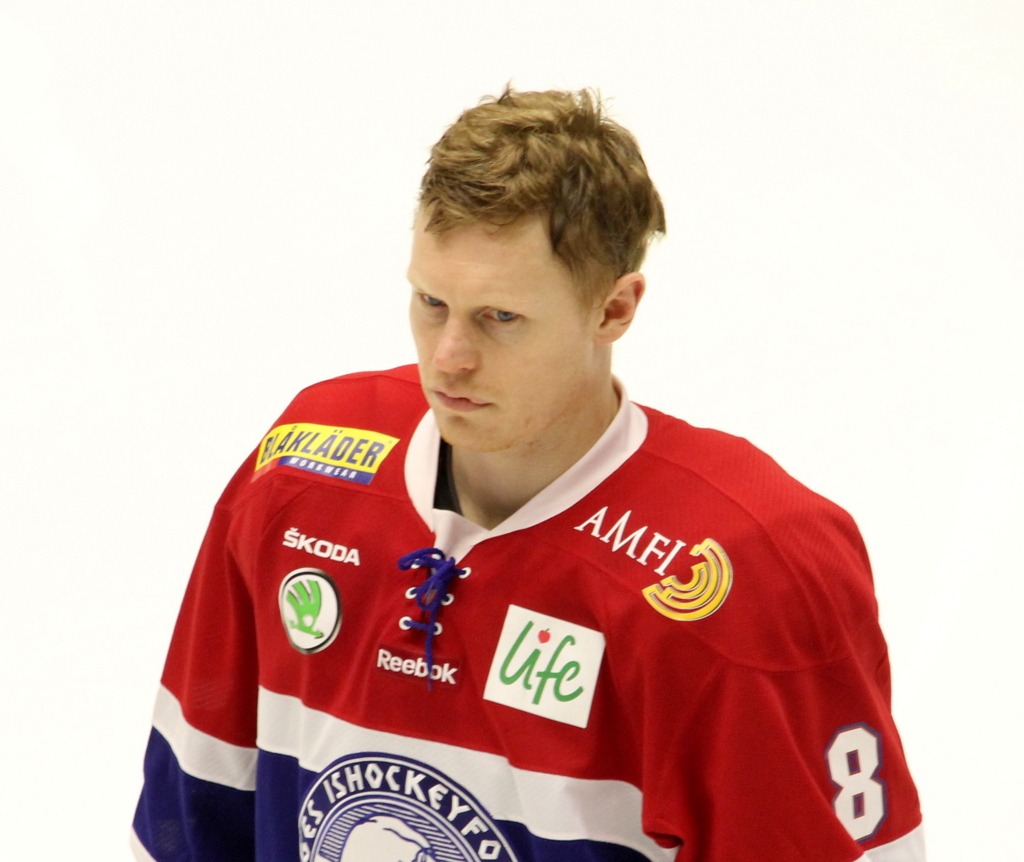
- Born: September 16, 1978 (age 46); Oslo, Norway
- Height: 6 ft 0 in (183 cm)
- Weight: 198 lb (90 kg; 14 st 2 lb)
- Position: Centre
- Shot: Left
- Played for: Storhamar Dragons; Brynäs; Oskarshamn Eagles; Hammarby IF; Vålerenga; Manglerud Star
- National team: Norway
- Playing career: 1996–2015

Mads Hansen (born September 16, 1978) is a retired Norwegian professional ice hockey player.

== Playing career ==
During the 2005–06 season he enjoyed one of the best performances ever in the Norwegian GET-ligaen for the Storhamar Dragons. Playing on a line with Patrick Yetman he scored a total of 77 points in 49 regular season and playoff games. A performance which earned him a contract with Brynäs of the Swedish SEL.

He also was a regular on Team Norway and has participated in a number of IIHF World Championships.

== Career statistics ==
=== Regular season and playoffs ===
			Regular season					Playoffs
Season	Team	League	GP	G	A	Pts	PIM	GP	G	A	Pts	PIM
1996–97	Manglerud Star	NOR	33	4	1	5	22	—	—	—	—	—
1997–98	Manglerud Star	NOR	43	7	11	18	16	—	—	—	—	—
1998–99	Manglerud Star	NOR	43	8	12	20	30	—	—	—	—	—
1999–2000	Storhamar Dragons	NOR	37	9	8	17	16	7	2	3	5	2
2000–01	Storhamar Dragons	NOR	42	18	19	37	83	3	0	1	1	2
2001–02	Storhamar Dragons	NOR	41	12	20	32	36	11	6	5	11	8
2002–03	Vålerenga Ishockey	NOR	37	13	21	34	14	—	—	—	—	—
2003–04	Hammarby IF	Allsv	43	12	16	28	26	7	1	1	2	4
2004–05	IK Oskarshamn	Allsv	44	9	13	22	59	8	0	1	1	6
2005–06	Storhamar Dragons	NOR	41	21	46	67	24	8	3	7	10	0
2006–07	Brynäs IF	SEL	54	8	11	19	32	7	0	0	0	8
2007–08	Brynäs IF	SEL	53	5	15	20	58	—	—	—	—	—
2008–09	Brynäs IF	SEL	52	14	8	22	38	4	0	0	0	8
2009–10	Brynäs IF	SEL	49	4	15	19	28	5	0	0	0	2
2010–11	Brynäs IF	SEL	51	7	7	14	36	5	0	1	1	2
2011–12	Brynäs IF	SEL	48	5	10	15	20	17	2	2	4	14
2012–13	Brynäs IF	SEL	42	2	8	10	38	4	0	1	1	6
2013–14	Storhamar Dragons	NOR	43	7	31	38	50	12	0	5	5	10
2014–15	Storhamar Dragons	NOR	33	7	23	30	18	6	0	2	2	0
NOR totals			393	106	192	298	309	47	11	23	34	22
SEL totals			349	45	74	119	250	42	2	4	6	40

=== International ===
Year	Team	Event	GP	G	A	Pts	PIM
1996	Norway	EJC B	5	1	0	1	4
1997	Norway	WJC B	7	3	1	4	0
1999	Norway	WC Q	3	0	0	0	0
2000	Norway	WC	6	0	0	0	0
2001	Norway	OGQ	3	0	0	0	2
2001	Norway	WC	6	0	0	0	2
2002	Norway	WC D1	5	1	1	2	6
2003	Norway	WC D1	5	0	2	2	14
2004	Norway	WC D1	5	0	4	4	2
2005	Norway	OGQ	6	2	6	8	4
2005	Norway	WC D1	5	1	5	6	8
2006	Norway	WC	6	1	1	2	6
2007	Norway	WC	6	2	2	4	6
2008	Norway	WC	7	1	2	3	8
2009	Norway	OGQ	3	0	1	1	6
2009	Norway	WC	6	0	0	0	12
2010	Norway	OG	4	1	0	1	2
2011	Norway	WC	7	0	1	1	16
2012	Norway	WC	8	2	7	9	4
2013	Norway	WC	7	1	0	1	6
2014	Norway	OG	4	0	0	0	0
2014	Norway	WC	7	1	0	1	0
Junior totals			12	4	1	5	4
Senior totals			109	13	32	45	104

Preceded by Mikael Tjälldèn	Storhamar Dragons captains 2005-06	Succeeded by Mattias Livf
