= Alexander Smirnov (ice hockey) =

Russian ice hockey player

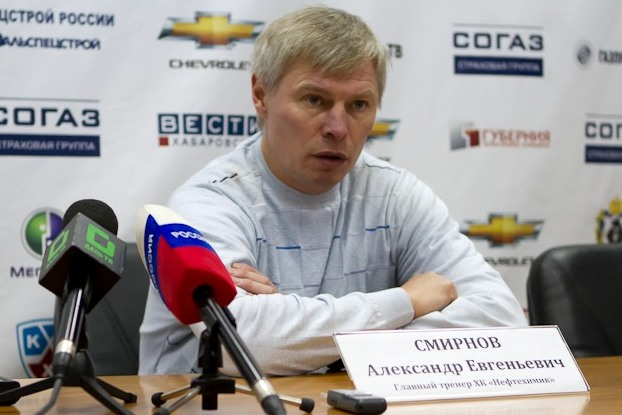
- Born: 17 August 1964 (age 60); Voskresensk, URS
- Height: 6 ft 1 in (185 cm)
- Weight: 178 lb (81 kg; 12 st 10 lb)
- Position: Defence
- Shot: Left
- Played for: Khimik Voskresensk; TPS Turku; Kapfenberg; Storhamar Dragons
- National team: Russia
- Playing career: 1982–2006

Alexander Yevgenievich Smirnov (Russian: Апексндр Евгеньевич Смирнов), born 17 August 1964 in Voskresensk, Soviet Union), is a former ice hockey player.

== Playing career ==
A former Russian ice hockey player who has played for Russia's national team, winning the gold medal at IIHF's 1993 World Championships in Germany.

He played nine seasons for the Storhamar Dragons and won the Norwegian Cup as head coach with the Dragons in 2008.

== Coaching career ==
Smirnov is currently the head coach of the Severstal Cherepovets of the Kontinental Hockey League in Russia. He has been the head coach of the Storhamar Dragons on two occasions, and has previously coached Gjøvik Hockey, Norway.

== Career statistics ==
=== Regular season and playoffs ===
| | | | Regular season | | | | | Playoffs |
| Season | Team | League | GP | G | A | Pts | PIM | GP | G | A | Pts | PIM |
|---|---|---|---|---|---|---|---|---|---|---|---|---|
| 1982–83 | Khimik Voskresensk | URS | 12 | 0 | 1 | 1 | 6 | — | — | — | — | — |
| 1983–84 | Khimik Voskresensk | URS | 42 | 4 | 3 | 7 | 34 | — | — | — | — | — |
| 1984–85 | Khimik Voskresensk | URS | 50 | 8 | 8 | 16 | 32 | — | — | — | — | — |
| 1985–86 | Khimik Voskresensk | URS | 39 | 5 | 5 | 10 | 20 | — | — | — | — | — |
| 1986–87 | Khimik Voskresensk | URS | 40 | 4 | 11 | 15 | 38 | — | — | — | — | — |
| 1987–88 | Khimik Voskresensk | URS | 42 | 2 | 9 | 11 | 28 | — | — | — | — | — |
| 1988–89 | Khimik Voskresensk | URS | 44 | 3 | 10 | 13 | 26 | — | — | — | — | — |
| 1989–90 | Khimik Voskresensk | URS | 48 | 9 | 12 | 21 | 54 | — | — | — | — | — |
| 1990–91 | Khimik Voskresensk | URS | 46 | 8 | 12 | 20 | 32 | — | — | — | — | — |
| 1991–92 | Khimik Voskresensk | CIS | 30 | 1 | 6 | 7 | 36 | 7 | 0 | 1 | 1 | 6 |
| 1992–93 | TPS | SM-l | 48 | 6 | 15 | 21 | 36 | 12 | 3 | 3 | 6 | 14 |
| 1993–94 | TPS | SM-l | 43 | 5 | 12 | 17 | 48 | 11 | 1 | 2 | 3 | 4 |
| 1994–95 | TPS | SM-l | 49 | 3 | 13 | 16 | 34 | 12 | 1 | 4 | 5 | 39 |
| 1995–96 | Storhamar Ishockey | NOR | 28 | 5 | 10 | 15 | 26 | 10 | 2 | 1 | 3 | 10 |
| 1996–97 | Storhamar Ishockey | NOR | 36 | 13 | 30 | 43 | 24 | 10 | 5 | 5 | 10 | 6 |
| 1997–98 | Storhamar Ishockey | NOR | 42 | 11 | 32 | 43 | 56 | 6 | 0 | 2 | 2 | 8 |
| 1998–99 | Storhamar Ishockey | NOR | 42 | 12 | 29 | 41 | 76 | 10 | 3 | 9 | 12 | 6 |
| 1999–2000 | Storhamar Ishockey | NOR | 35 | 8 | 27 | 35 | 64 | 7 | 1 | 5 | 6 | 33 |
| 2000–01 | Storhamar Ishockey | NOR | 42 | 9 | 21 | 30 | 46 | 3 | 0 | 0 | 0 | 12 |
| 2001–02 | Khimik Voskresensk | RUS.2 | 51 | 2 | 7 | 9 | 63 | 14 | 3 | 2 | 5 | 8 |
| 2002–03 | Khimik Voskresensk | RUS.2 | 36 | 3 | 10 | 13 | 32 | 13 | 0 | 1 | 1 | 2 |
| 2003–04 | Storhamar Ishockey | NOR | 40 | 2 | 18 | 20 | 34 | 13 | 1 | 2 | 3 | 8 |
| 2004–05 | Storhamar Ishockey | NOR | 29 | 2 | 12 | 14 | 28 | 7 | 1 | 0 | 1 | 2 |
| 2005–06 | Storhamar Ishockey | NOR | 41 | 6 | 13 | 19 | 36 | 10 | 2 | 5 | 7 | 18 |
| URS/CIS totals | | | 393 | 44 | 77 | 121 | 306 | 7 | 0 | 1 | 1 | 6 |
| SM-l totals | | | 140 | 14 | 40 | 54 | 118 | 35 | 5 | 9 | 14 | 57 |
| NOR totals | | | 335 | 68 | 192 | 260 | 390 | 76 | 15 | 29 | 44 | 103 |

=== International ===
| Year | Team | Event | Result | GP | G | A | Pts | PIM |
|---|---|---|---|---|---|---|---|---|
| 1984 | Soviet Union | WJC | 1st place, gold medalist(s) | 7 | 3 | 1 | 4 | 2 |
| 1993 | Russia | WC | 1st place, gold medalist(s) | 8 | 0 | 1 | 1 | 6 |
| 1994 | Russia | OG | 4th | 8 | 1 | 0 | 1 | 8 |
| 1994 | Russia | WC | 5th | 6 | 1 | 2 | 3 | 4 |
| 1995 | Russia | WC | 5th | 6 | 0 | 3 | 3 | 4 |
| 1996 | Russia | WC | 4th | 7 | 0 | 0 | 0 | 8 |
| Senior totals | | | | 35 | 2 | 6 | 8 | 30 |
