= Patrick Thoresen =

Norwegian ice hockey player (born 1983)

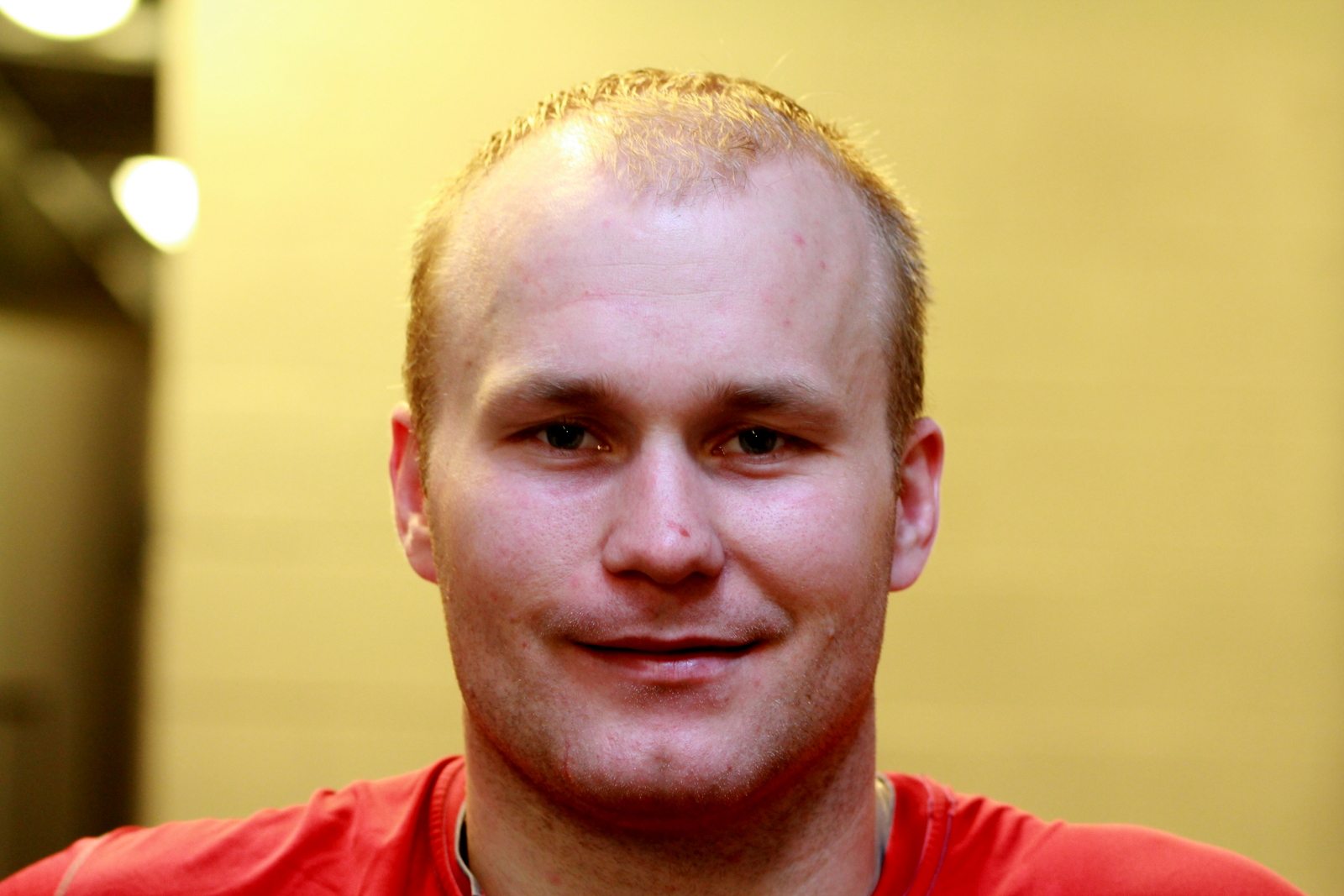
- Born: 7 November 1983 (age 43) Oslo, Norway
- Height: 6 ft 0 in (183 cm)
- Weight: 198 lb (90 kg; 14 st 2 lb)
- Position: Left wing
- Shot: Left
- Played for: Storhamar Hockey; Edmonton Oilers; Philadelphia Flyers; HC Lugano; Salavat Yulaev Ufa; SKA Saint Petersburg; ZSC Lions; Djurgårdens IF
- National team: Norway
- NHL draft: Undrafted
- Playing career: 2003–2025

Patrick Thoresen (born 7 November 1983) is a Norwegian former professional ice hockey left winger who last played for Djurgårdens IF of the Swedish Hockey League. He has a younger brother, Steffen who's also an ice hockey player. His father Petter was one of Norway's players who played at five Olympic Winter Games (1980–1994). Thoresen would follow in his father's footsteps and play in the Winter Olympics in Vancouver 2010 and Sochi 2014.

== Playing career ==
Thoresen started his career with his hometown Storhamar Dragons before he shifted to Canada and played junior hockey for two teams in the QMJHL, the Moncton Wildcats and the Baie-Comeau Drakkar. In the 2002–03 season, while a member of the Drakkar, he had 108 points in 71 games played, good enough for second in team scoring. His 75 assists that season were best in the QMJHL. This was a vast improvement from his first year of junior in which he compiled 73 points in 60 games played.

His first year of pro hockey was spent mostly with the Division 2 team, Mörrums GoIS IK, where he put up 41 points in 38 games. He eventually made the Elitserien where he then spent two years playing regularly for Djurgården, and collecting 53 points, 27 of them goals, in 80 games.

On 31 May 2006, Thoresen signed a contract with the Oilers as a free agent. He was somewhat of a surprise in training camp and played well enough for Oilers coach Craig MacTavish to publicly state that he had earned a spot on the roster for the 2006–07 season.

Thoresen scored his first NHL goal on 12 October 2006 against Evgeni Nabokov of the San Jose Sharks. In 68 games during his rookie campaign, he tallied four goals (including two game winners) and 12 assists with a plus/minus of -1, among the best of the Oilers regulars that season, but was placed on waivers before the end of the 2007-8 season.

On 22 February 2008, Thoresen was claimed off waivers by the Philadelphia Flyers. On 11 April 2008, Thoresen was hit in the groin by a Mike Green slapshot during a playoff game against the Capitals. Thoresen was taken off the ice and driven to a local hospital. He returned to action later in the playoffs, the first Norwegian to take part in NHL postseason play.

On 14 July 2008, Thoresen signed a one-year contract with HC Lugano of the Swiss League. He finished the season with 63 points in 48 games, good for third overall in the NLA.

On 21 May 2009, Thoresen signed a two-year contract with Salavat Yulaev Ufa of the Kontinental Hockey League. He finished the regular season with 57 points in 56 games, sixth overall in the entire KHL. He also led all players in the plus/minus category with +45 (the previous season best was Alexei Tereshchenko with +41). He scored seven game-winning goals (2nd overall), including four consecutive game-winning goals to end the regular season.

During the offseason of 2010 he opted out of his contract with Salavat Yulaev in search of a new NHL contract. Unable to get one, he decided to stay with Salavat for another season. Thoresen ended the 2010/11 KHL regular season as second overall in point scoring (65), second in goals scored (29) and third in assists (36). During the playoffs, he amassed a total of 18 points en route to winning the Gagarin Cup, the first Norwegian to do so. His three goals and fifteen assists tied hom with Alexander Radulov for the team lead in points and fourth overall in the KHL.

Thoresen is a two-time nominee for the Norwegian team sports athlete of the year award (Idrettsgallaen - 2009 and 2010).

Prior to the 2011-12 season, he inked a deal with SKA St. Petersburg and in April 2014, he signed a one-year extension. He remained with the team until the end of the 2014-15 season and then spent the 2015-16 campaign with Djurgårdens IF of the Swedish Hockey League (SHL). In May 2016, he signed with the ZSC Lions of the Swiss National League A (NLA).

In 2017 he returned to Storhamar to aid the club in winning the 2017-18 Norwegian series, GET Ligaen. However, in October of the same year he returned to SKA St. Petersburg. He returned to Storhamar at the conclusion of the season with SKA suffering a conference finals defeat to CSKA Moscow.

== International play ==
Thoresen has played for the Norwegian national team numerous times. His first international experience came at the IIHF World U18 Championship in 2000 and 2001. He played in the World Junior Championships (division 1) in 2001 and 2002. In 2002, he posted excellent numbers: four goals and four assists in five games.

He participated in the World Championships in 2006 and 2007, picking up a goal and four assists in the six games in 2007.

He was selected to represent Team Norway at the 2010 Winter Olympics in Vancouver, British Columbia, Canada, in which he had an impressive tournament and tallied five assists in four games. At the 2010 World Championships in Germany he notched six points in six games and led all players in scoring after the preliminary round.

He was second in tournament scoring at the 2012 World Championships, with 18 points in eight games. This included a 3-goal, 6-point effort in a 12-4 win over Germany. He was also named to the tournament's all-star team, becoming the first Norwegian ever to be named to the IIHF top division all star team.

== Career statistics ==
=== Regular season and playoffs ===
			Regular season					Playoffs
Season	Team	League	GP	G	A	Pts	PIM	GP	G	A	Pts	PIM
1999–2000	Storhamar Dragons	Elite	26	1	8	9	2	—	—	—	—	—
2000–01	Storhamar Dragons	Elite	41	18	27	45	24	3	0	0	0	2
2001–02	Moncton Wildcats	QMJHL	60	30	43	73	50	—	—	—	—	—
2002–03	Baie–Comeau Drakkar	QMJHL	71	33	75	108	57	12	2	8	10	8
2003–04	Mörrums GoIS IK	Allsv	38	19	22	41	40	—	—	—	—	—
2003–04	Djurgårdens IF	SEL	3	0	0	0	2	—	—	—	—	—
2004–05	Djurgårdens IF	SEL	30	10	7	17	33	12	2	2	4	29
2005–06	Djurgårdens IF	SEL	50	17	19	36	44	—	—	—	—	—
2005–06	EC Salzburg	EBEL	—	—	—	—	—	9	4	7	11	12
2006–07	Edmonton Oilers	NHL	68	4	12	16	42	—	—	—	—	—
2006–07	Wilkes–Barre/Scranton Penguins	AHL	5	1	5	6	4	—	—	—	—	—
2007–08	Springfield Falcons	AHL	29	13	13	26	13	—	—	—	—	—
2007–08	Edmonton Oilers	NHL	17	2	1	3	6	—	—	—	—	—
2007–08	Philadelphia Flyers	NHL	21	0	5	5	8	14	0	2	2	4
2008–09	HC Lugano	NLA	48	22	41	63	83	7	1	7	8	0
2009–10	Salavat Yulaev Ufa	KHL	56	24	33	57	71	15	5	9	14	37
2010–11	Salavat Yulaev Ufa	KHL	54	29	37	66	30	21	3	15	18	16
2011–12	SKA Saint Petersburg	KHL	45	15	26	41	34	15	2	5	7	10
2012–13	SKA Saint Petersburg	KHL	52	21	30	51	49	15	3	10	13	10
2013–14	SKA Saint Petersburg	KHL	37	11	19	30	44	10	5	8	13	0
2014–15	SKA Saint Petersburg	KHL	48	17	20	37	21	22	9	8	17	14
2015–16	Djurgårdens IF	SHL	49	15	33	48	34	8	3	6	9	31
2016–17	ZSC Lions	NLA	59	18	27	45	36	4	1	3	4	4
2017–18	Storhamar Hockey	GET	23	7	18	25	18	—	—	—	—	—
2017–18	SKA Saint Petersburg	KHL	15	4	7	11	6	12	1	5	6	14
2018–19	Storhamar Hockey	GET	45	26	39	65	18	13	3	13	16	4
2019–20	Storhamar Hockey	GET	44	21	43	64	48	—	—	—	—	—
2020–21	Storhamar Hockey	FKL	24	10	29	39	33	—	—	—	—	—
2021–22	Storhamar Hockey	FKL	37	20	32	52	39	15	3	6	9	31
2022–23	Storhamar Hockey	FKL	45	16	41	57	47	17	5	9	14	12
2023–24	Storhamar Hockey	EHL	45	22	42	64	18	12	6	9	15	25
2024–25	Djurgårdens IF	Allsv	48	14	27	41	18	6	1	1	2	4
SHL totals			132	42	59	101	113	20	5	8	13	60
NHL totals			106	6	18	24	66	14	0	2	2	4
KHL totals			307	121	172	293	262	110	28	60	88	101

=== International ===
Year	Team	Event	GP	G	A	Pts	PIM
2000	Norway	WJC18 B	5	3	2	5	6
2001	Norway	WJC D1	4	1	4	5	4
2001	Norway	WJC18	6	4	2	6	2
2002	Norway	WJC D1	5	4	4	8	0
2004	Norway	WC D1	5	4	5	9	2
2005	Norway	OGQ	6	3	5	8	4
2005	Norway	WC D1	5	4	4	8	2
2006	Norway	WC	5	2	0	2	6
2007	Norway	WC	6	1	4	5	2
2009	Norway	OGQ	3	4	2	6	2
2009	Norway	WC	6	2	0	2	6
2010	Norway	OG	4	0	5	5	0
2010	Norway	WC	6	2	4	6	2
2012	Norway	WC	8	7	11	18	4
2013	Norway	WC	7	1	1	2	16
2014	Norway	OG	4	1	1	2	2
2015	Norway	WC	7	4	3	7	6
2017	Norway	OGQ	3	0	4	4	0
2017	Norway	WC	7	3	4	7	2
2018	Norway	OG	5	1	1	2	0
2019	Norway	WC	7	0	0	0	2
2021	Norway	OGQ	1	0	0	0	0
2024	Norway	WC	7	1	5	6	6
2024	Norway	OGQ	3	4	1	5	0
Junior totals			14	8	10	18	10
Senior totals			105	44	60	104	64
