= Sjur Robert Nilsen =

Norwegian ice hockey player and coach

- Born: December 3, 1967 (age 57); Sarpsborg, NOR
- Height: 5 ft 8 in (173 cm)
- Weight: 190 lb (86 kg; 13 st 8 lb)
- Shot: Left
- Played for: Lillehammer; Sparta Warriors; EC Bad Nauheim
- National team: Norway

Sjur Robert Nilsen (born 3 December 1967) is a Norwegian professional ice hockey head coach, currently serving as the head coach of Sparta Warriors of the GET-ligaen.

In his player career, he played for clubs Lillehammer, Sparta Warriors and EC Bad Nauheim. He also played for the Norwegian national ice hockey team.

He has also been assistant coach of the Norwegian national team, as well as head coach of Storhamar and Swedish club Leksand.
