= List of Storhamar Hockey seasons =

Storhamar Hockey is a Norwegian ice hockey club based in Hamar. They are members of the highest Norwegian ice hockey league, Eliteserien (known as GET-ligaen for sponsorship reasons). Their home arena has been Hamar OL-Amfi since 1992. Ice hockey in Hamar was first played in 1955 by boys who had been inspired by the 1952 Winter Olympics in Oslo. This became the basis of Storhamar Ishockey, which was founded in 1957 as a department of the sports club Storhamar IL. Since 1998, they have been marketing themselves as the Storhamar Dragons. As of 2010, they have completed thirty seasons in the Eliteserien, winning 670 regular season games and seven league titles.

Storhamar qualified for the 2. divisjon (second tier) in 1962 as the first team outside Oslo, and were promoted to the highest division, 1. divisjon (Eliteserien from 1990 onwards), for the first time in 1977. During the 1990s, the Dragons established themselves as one of the leadings teams in Norway, winning their first Norwegian Championship title in 1995. Between the 1993–94 season and 1999–2000 season, they contested all seven Finals, winning four times. After losing out in the semi-finals in 2001, the Dragons have reached another five Finals, winning twice.

== Seasons ==
Norwegian Champions	Regular Season Champions	Promoted	Relegated

Season	League	Division	Regular season^{[a]}										Postseason^{[a]}								Roster
Season	League	Division	GP	W	L	T	OTW	OTL	GF	GA	Pts	Finish	GP	W	L	T	GF	GA	Pts	Result	Roster
1959–60	Hedmark/Oppland	Hedmark					—	—				1st								Won Hedmark/Oppland Championship	
1960–61	2. divisjon	C	5	5	0	0	—	—	87	13	10	1st									
1961–62	3. divisjon^{[b]}	A	8^{[c]}	6	2	0	—	—	82	19	14	1st^{[d]}	2	2	0	—	19	7	—	Won in Semi-final, 12–1 (Lillehammer); Won 3. divisjon Championship, 7–6 (Drammen)	
1962–63	2. divisjon	A	11^{[e]}	7	2	0	—	—	50	32	14										
1963–64	2. divisjon^{[f]}	B	12^{[g]}	2	9	0	—	—	21	67	4										
1964–65	3. divisjon	D	8	8	0	0	—	—	72	14	16	1st	5	4	1	0	35	18	8	1st in Qualifying for 2. divisjon	
1965–66	2. divisjon	B	10	4	5	1	—	—	42	38	9	4th									
1966–67	2. divisjon	B	10	5	3	2	—	—	43	31	12	2nd									
1967–68	2. divisjon	B	10	5	5	0	—	—	33	33	10	3rd									
1968–69	2. divisjon	B	10	5	4	1	—	—	49	41	11	2nd									
1969–70	2. divisjon	A	10	2	8	0	—	—	48	66	4	6th									
1970–71	2. divisjon^{[h]}	A	10	1	8	1	—	—	33	52	3	6th	4	1	3	0	11	19	2	3rd in Qualifying for 2. divisjon	
1971–72	3. divisjon	A	10^{[i]}	9	0	0	—	—	62	9	18	1st	3	3	0	0	23	3	6	1st in Qualifying for 2. divisjon	
1972–73	2. divisjon	B	7	1	6	0	—	—	16	50	2	5th	8	7	0	1	55	31	15	1st in Qualifying for 2. divisjon	
1973–74	2. divisjon		18	8	8	2	—	—	95	85	18	5th									
1974–75	2. divisjon		18	7	8	3	—	—	77	92	17	6th									
1975–76	2. divisjon		18	11	7	0	—	—	98	69	22	4th									
1976–77	2. divisjon		18	12	3	3	—	—	106	53	27	2nd									
1977–78	1. divisjon		18	2	14	2	—	—	55	132	6	9th	6	3	2	1	36	28	7	1st in Qualifying for 1. divisjon	
1978–79	1. divisjon		18	2	16	0	—	—	51	134	4	10th	6	1	5	0	13	43	2	4th in Qualifying for 1. divisjon	
1979–80	2. divisjon		18	12	3	3	—	—	131	63	27	2nd^{[j]}									
1980–81	2. divisjon		22	14	6	2	—	—	116	82	30	4th									
1981–82	2. divisjon		22	18	2	2	—	—	166	77	38	1st									
1982–83	1. divisjon		36	12	22	2	—	—	165	240	26	9th	2	2	0	0	12	4	—	Won Qualifying for 1. divisjon, 2–0 (Rosenborg)	
1983–84	1. divisjon		28	5	19	4	—	—	101	176	14	7th	2	2	0	0	24	2	—	Won Qualifying for 1. divisjon, 2–0 (Strindheim)	
1984–85	1. divisjon		18	13	4	1	—	—	134	77	27	2nd	3	1	2	—	11	12	—	Lost in Semi-finals, 1–2 (Furuset)	
1984–85	Mellomspillet^{[k]}		10	8	2	0	—	—	58	48	16	1st	3	1	2	—	11	12	—	Lost in Semi-finals, 1–2 (Furuset)	
1985–86	1. divisjon		36	22	13	1	—	—	208	144	45	4th	2	0	2	—	5	13	—	Lost in Semi-finals, 0–2 (Stjernen)	
1986–87	1. divisjon		36	17	17	2	—	—	181	157	36	5th	Did not qualify								
1987–88	1. divisjon		36	23	11	2	—	—	177	124	48	2nd	2	0	2	—	6	9	—	Lost in Semi-finals, 0–2 (Furuset)	
1988–89	1. divisjon		36	22	13	1	—	—	180	153	45	2nd	2	0	2	—	5	15	—	Lost in Semi-finals, 0–2 (Sparta)	
1989–90	1. divisjon		36	23	10	3	—	—	200	131	49	5th	Did not qualify								
1990–91	Eliteserien I^{[l]}		18	6	11	1	—	—	69	77	13	7th	Did not qualify								
1990–91	Eliteserien II^{[m]}		32	12	19	1	—	—	129	140	25	6th	Did not qualify								
1991–92	Eliteserien I		18	11	6	1	—	—	101	57	23	2nd	2	1	1	—	12	10	2	2nd in Quarter-finals	
1991–92	Eliteserien II		14	7	7	0	—	—	68	59	14	4th	3	1	2	—	12	16	—	Lost in Semi-finals, 1–2 (Vålerenga)	
1992–93	Eliteserien I		18	14	4	0	—	—	120	48	28	3rd	2	1	1	—	5	5	2	2nd in Quarter-finals	
1992–93	Eliteserien II		14	10	4	0	—	—	78	30	22	1st	3	1	2	—	8	8	—	Lost in Semi-finals, 1–2 (Vålerenga)	
1993–94	Eliteserien I		18	14	3	1	—	—	125	51	29	1st	2	1	1	—	7	4	2	1st in Quarter-finals	
1993–94	Eliteserien II		14	9	4	1	—	—	66	49	19	2nd	6	3	3	—	20	19	—	Won in Semi-finals, 2–0 (Stjernen); Lost in Finals, 1–3 (Lillehammer)	
1994–95	Eliteserien		28	21	2	5	—	—	192	57	47	1st	4	3	1	—	12	11	6	2nd in Quarter-finals	
1994–95	Eliteserien		28	21	2	5	—	—	192	57	47	1st	5	5	0	—	26	10	—	Won in Semi-finals, 2–0 (Vålerenga); Won Norwegian Championship, 3–0 (Stjernen)	
1995–96	Eliteserien		28	20	8	0	—	—	128	56	40	3rd	4	4	0	—	19	8	8	1st in Quarter-finals	
1995–96	Eliteserien		28	20	8	0	—	—	128	56	40	3rd	6	6	0	—	30	8	—	Won in Semi-finals, 3–0 (Lillehammer); Won Norwegian Championship, 3–0 (Vålerenga)	
1996–97	Eliteserien		36	33	1	2	—	—	252	58	68	1st	10	9	1	—	51	20	—	Won in Quarter-finals, 3–0 (Lørenskog); Won in Semi-finals, 3–0 (Stjernen); Won Norwegian Championship, 3–1 (Vålerenga)	
1997–98	Eliteserien		44	32	9	3	—	—	213	92	67	2nd	6	3	3	—	15	22	—	Won in Semi-finals, 3–0 (Stjernen); Lost in Finals, 0–3 (Vålerenga)	
1998–99	Eliteserien		44	30	8	6	—	—	196	104	66	2nd	10	5	5	—	34	33	—	Won in Semi-finals, 3–2 (Trondheim); Lost in Finals, 2–3 (Vålerenga)	
1999–2000	Eliteserien		38	27	10	1	—	—	167	81	55	2nd	7	6	1	—	28	18	—	Won in Semi-finals, 3–0 (Sparta); Won Norwegian Championship, 3–1 (Vålerenga)	
2000–01	Eliteserien		42	37	3	2	—	—	214	74	76	1st	3	0	3	—	1	7	—	Lost in Semi-finals, 0–3 (Frisk)	
2001–02	Eliteserien		42	29	10	3	—	—	189	101	61	3rd	11	7	4	—	40	24	—	Won in Quarter-finals, 2–0 (Sparta); Won in Semi-finals, 3–1 (Vålerenga); Lost in Finals, 2–3 (Frisk)	
2002–03^{[n]}	Eliteserien		38	20	8	—	5	5	170	101	75	2nd	8	3	5	—	20	32	—	Bye to Semi-finals; Won in Semi-finals, 3–1 (Frisk); Lost in Finals, 0–4 (Vålerenga)	
2003–04	Eliteserien		42	29	8	—	2	3	151	87	94	1st	13	10	3	—	43	21	—	Won in Quarter-finals, 3–0 (Bergen Flyers); Won in Semi-finals, 3–0 (Stavanger); Won Norwegian Championship, 4–3 (Vålerenga)	
2004–05	Eliteserien		42	24	13	—	4	1	138	87	79	3rd	7	3	4	—	21	12	—	Won in Quarter-finals, 3–1 (Sparta); Lost in Semi-finals, 0–3 (Trondheim)	
2005–06	Eliteserien		42	34	4	—	2	2	202	68	108	1st	10	6	4	—	32	24	—	Won in Quarter-finals, 4–0 (Frisk); Lost in Semi-finals, 2–4 (Vålerenga)	
2006–07	Eliteserien		44	29	8	—	4	3	185	100	98	2nd	17	9	8	—	65	53	—	Won in Quarter-finals, 4–2 (Stjernen); Won in Semi-finals, 4–2 (Stavanger); Lost in Finals, 1–4 (Vålerenga)	
2007–08	Eliteserien		44	25	15	—	2	2	161	117	81	4th	16	12	4	—	44	34	—	Won in Quarter-finals, 4–0 (Stavanger); Won in Semi-finals, 4–2 (Vålerenga); Won Norwegian Championship, 4–2 (Frisk)	
2008–09	Eliteserien		45	19	19	—	2	5	137	121	66	5th	10	4	6	—	18	14	—	Won in Quarter-finals, 4–2 (Stavanger); Lost in Semi-finals, 0–4 (Sparta)	
2009–10	Eliteserien		48	16	23	—	6	3	154	160	58^{[o]}	8th	10	5	5	—	21	31	—	Won in Quarter-finals, 4–1 (Lørenskog); Lost in Semi-finals, 1–4 (Vålerenga)	Roster
Eliteserien totals^{[p]}			1,073	643	335	44	27	24	4,988	3,366	1,599		182	108	78	2	611	493	60	23 playoff appearances	

== Notes ==
- ^{a} Code explanation; GP—Games Played, W—Wins, L—Losses, T—Tied games, OTW—Overtime/Shootout wins, OTL—Overtime/Shootout losses, GF—Goals For, GA—Goals Against, Pts—Points
- ^{b} Before the 1961–62 season, the club were moved down to the 3. divisjon (fourth tier) due to a re-organization of the league system.
- ^{c} The result of the eighth game is unknown.
- ^{d} Storhamar tied first with Grüner and won the two-legged replay for the Division Championship (2–2, 11–4).
- ^{e} The results of the sixth and seventh game are unknown.
- ^{f} Before the 1963–64 season, the top division, Hovedserien was renamed 1. divisjon. Correspondingly, the 1. divisjon (second tier) was renamed 2. divisjon, the 2. divisjon (third tier) was renamed 3. divisjon etc.
- ^{g} The result of the twelfth game is unknown.
- ^{h} Before the 1970–71 season, the Dragons re-qualified for the 2. divisjon after defeating Eiksmarka 7–3 during the pre-season.
- ^{i} The result of the tenth game is unknown.
- ^{j} Storhamar declined to participate in qualifying for the 1. divisjon due to the ongoing construction of Storhamar Ishall.
- ^{k} Mellomspillet was a one-time continuation league contested in 1984–85 between the six highest ranked teams in the 1. divisjon. Of these six teams, the top four qualified for the semi-finals of the Norwegian Championship.
- ^{l} Before the 1990–91 season, the 1. divisjon was renamed Eliteserien. Correspondingly, the 2. divisjon (second tier) was renamed 1. divisjon, the 3. divisjon (third tier) was renamed 2. divisjon etc.
- ^{m} Between the 1990–91 season and the 1993–94 season, the Eliteserien was divided into two parts. After the first 18 games, the top eight teams qualified for the second half of the Eliteserien. In 1990–91, the results of both rounds were added up to produce one regular season champion; in the three following seasons, there were two champions per season.
- ^{n} As of the 2002–03 season, all games have a winner. In addition, teams now receive three points for a win in regulation time, two points for a win in overtime and one point for a loss in overtime.
- ^{o} Storhamar were deducted five points for use of an ineligible player during three games in November 2009.
- ^{p} Totals as of the completion of the 2009–10 season.
