= Åge Ellingsen =

Norwegian ice hockey player

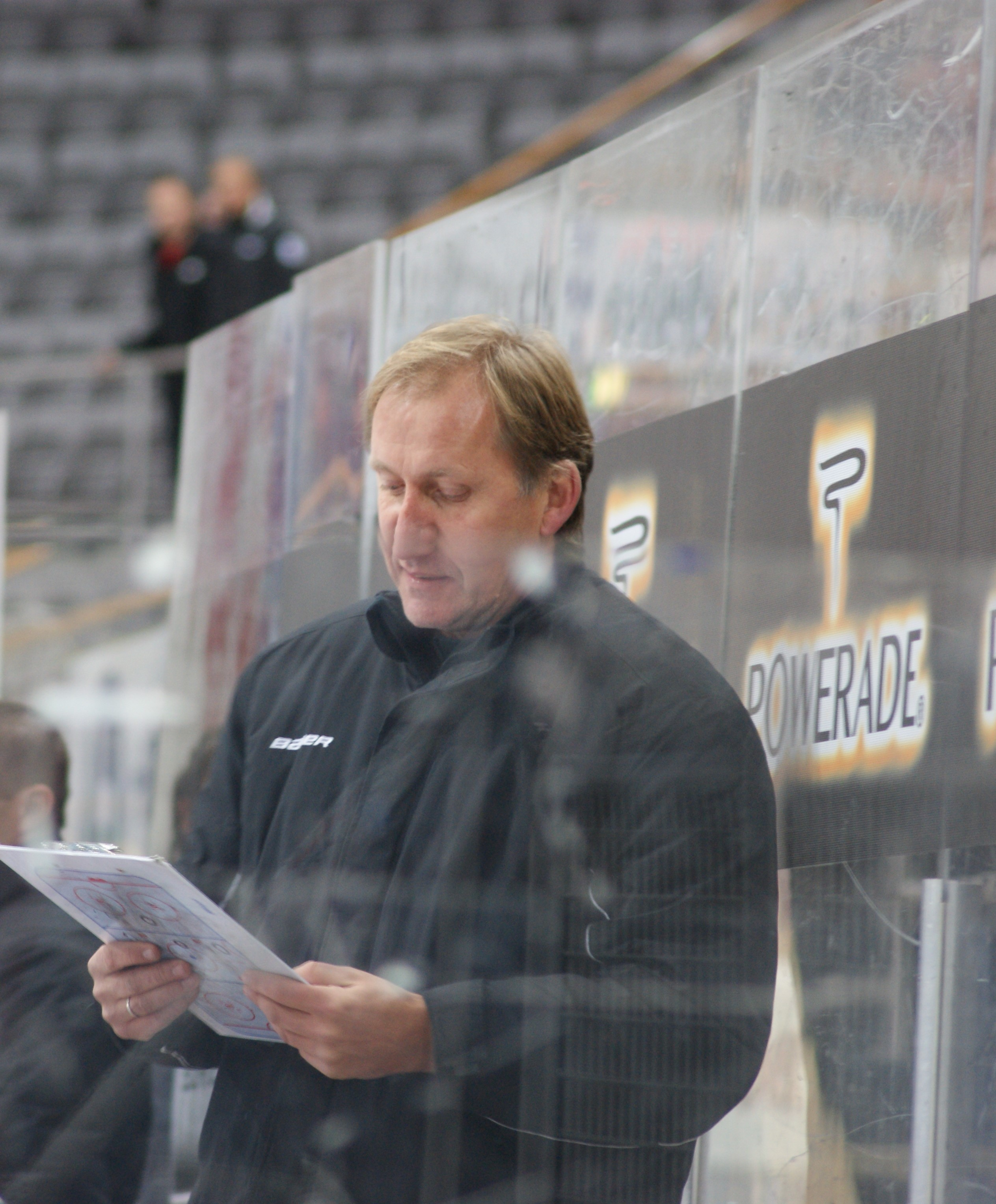
- Born: 5 November 1962 (age 63) Oslo, Norway
- Height: 6 ft 4 in (193 cm)
- Weight: 209 lb (95 kg; 14 st 13 lb)
- Position: Defence
- Shot: Left
- Played for: Forward; Björklöven; Stjernen; Furuset; Storhamar Dragons; Lillehammer
- National team: Norway
- NHL draft: 168th overall, 1987; Edmonton Oilers
- Playing career: 1981–1996

Åge Ellingsen (born 5 November 1962 in Oslo, Norway) is a former Norwegian ice hockey defenceman.

== Playing career ==
Ellingsen, nicknamed "the Moose", played nine seasons with Storhamar in Norway from 1983 to 1994. In 1987/88 he played for Björklöven in the Swedish Elite League (SEL), together with fellow Norwegian Erik Kristiansen. His native club was Forward of Oslo. He also played one season with Stjernen. His last club was Lillehammer.

Ellingsen also drew some interest from the Edmonton Oilers of the NHL and was drafted in the 8th round (168th overall) in 1987 but did not manage to get a contract.

He played 67 games for Norway's National team.

Today Åge is trainer for NTG-Lillehammer.

== Post-retirement ==
Ellingsen is now a TV expert hockey commentator for NRK and SportN.
