= Petter Salsten =

Norwegian ice hockey player, coach and sports official

- Born: March 11, 1965 (age 60) Oslo, Norway
- Height: 6 ft 3 in (191 cm)
- Weight: 207 lb (94 kg; 14 st 11 lb)
- Position: Defence
- Shot: Left
- Played for: Furuset Ishockey; AIK IF; Storhamar Ishockey
- National team: Norway
- Playing career: 1985–2000

Petter Salsten (born 11 March 1965) is a Norwegian ice hockey player, coach and sports official. He played for the Norwegian national ice hockey team, and participated at the Winter Olympics in 1988, 1992, and 1994. He played for the clubs Furuset, AIK in Stockholm, Sweden, and Storhamar, and was Norwegian champion in 1990, 1995, 1996, 1997 and 2000. He was awarded Gullpucken as best Norwegian ice hockey player in 1988 and 1997.

He was appointed secretary general for the Norwegian Ice Hockey Federation from 2025.
