= Lars Bergseng =

Norwegian ice hockey player

Lars Bergseng (born May 14, 1963) is a former Norwegian ice hockey player. He was born in Lillehammer, Norway and is the brother of Arne Bergseng. He played for the Norwegian national ice hockey team at the 1988 Winter Olympics.
