= Daniel Ohrn =

Swedish ice hockey player

Daniel Öhrn
- Born: January 27, 1993 (age 32) Sundsvall, Sweden
- Height: 5 ft 11 in (180 cm)
- Weight: 185 lb (84 kg; 13 st 3 lb)
- Position: Center
- Shoots: Left
- Hockeyallsvenskan team Former teams: Östersund IK; Timrå IK Sparta Warriors
- NHL draft: Undrafted
- Playing career: 2011–present

Daniel Ohrn (born January 27, 1993) is a Swedish ice hockey player. He is currently playing with Östersund IK in the hockeyallsvenskan |].
