= 2021–22 Fjordkraftligaen season =

2021-22 Fjordkraftligaen season
- League: (Norway) Fjordkraftligaen
- Sport: Ice hockey
- Duration: 11 September 2021 – 24 April 2022
- Number of teams: 10
- TV partner(s): TV 2 Sport

Regular season
- League champions: Stavanger Oilers (6th title)

Playoffs
- Finals champions: Stavanger Oilers (8th title)
- Runners-up: Storhamar

Eliteserien seasons
- ← 2020–21 2022–23 →

The 2021-22 Fjordkraftligaen was the 83rd season of Norway's premier ice hockey league, Eliteserien, and the 2nd under the sponsorship name Fjordkraftligaen.

== Participating teams ==
Fjordkraftligaen teams

| Team | City | Arena | Capacity |
|---|---|---|---|
| Frisk Asker | Asker | Askerhallen | 2,400 |
| Grüner | Oslo | Grünerhallen | 500 |
| Lillehammer IK | Lillehammer | Eidsiva Arena | 3,197 |
| Manglerud Star | Oslo | Manglerudhallen | 1,050 |
| Ringerike Panthers | Hønefoss | Schjongshallen | 1,500 |
| Sparta Sarpsborg | Sarpsborg | Sparta Amfi | 3,450 |
| Stavanger Oilers | Stavanger | DNB Arena | 4,377 |
| Stjernen | Fredrikstad | Stjernehallen | 2,473 |
| Storhamar | Hamar | CC Amfi | 7,000 |
| Vålerenga | Oslo | Nye Jordal Amfi | 5,300 |

=== Team changes ===
After finishing first in the 2020-21 Norwegian First Division, Ringerike Panthers qualified for the Fjordkraftligaen, replacing Narvik IK who finished last in the 2020-21 Fjordkraftligaen.

== Regular season ==
=== Standings ===
| Pos | Team | Pld | W | OTW | OTL | L | GF | GA | GD | Pts | PPG | Qualification |
|---|---|---|---|---|---|---|---|---|---|---|---|---|
| 1 | Stavanger Oilers | 45 | 30 | 6 | 3 | 6 | 162 | 89 | +73 | 105 | 2.33 | Qualification to Fjordkraftligaen Play-offs |
| 2 | Stjernen | 43 | 23 | 6 | 3 | 11 | 157 | 112 | +45 | 84 | 1.95 | Qualification to Fjordkraftligaen Play-offs |
| 3 | Sparta Sarpsborg | 45 | 23 | 6 | 4 | 12 | 150 | 102 | +48 | 85 | 1.89 | Qualification to Fjordkraftligaen Play-offs |
| 4 | Vålerenga | 42 | 20 | 6 | 6 | 10 | 147 | 102 | +45 | 78 | 1.86 | Qualification to Fjordkraftligaen Play-offs |
| 5 | Frisk Asker | 45 | 22 | 5 | 3 | 15 | 171 | 138 | +33 | 79 | 1.76 | Qualification to Fjordkraftligaen Play-offs |
| 6 | Storhamar | 43 | 20 | 4 | 4 | 15 | 139 | 127 | +12 | 72 | 1.67 | Qualification to Fjordkraftligaen Play-offs |
| 7 | Lillehammer | 45 | 18 | 5 | 8 | 14 | 139 | 133 | +6 | 72 | 1.60 | Qualification to Fjordkraftligaen Play-offs |
| 8 | Ringerike Panthers | 44 | 8 | 8 | 5 | 23 | 112 | 147 | −35 | 45 | 1.02 | Qualification to Fjordkraftligaen Play-offs |
| 9 | Grüner | 44 | 4 | 1 | 9 | 30 | 88 | 197 | −109 | 23 | 0.52 | Qualification round |
| 10 | Manglerud Star | 44 | 3 | 2 | 4 | 35 | 78 | 196 | −118 | 17 | 0.39 | Qualification round |

Source: hockey.no
Rules for classification: 1) Points; 2) Head-to-head points.

=== Statistics ===
==== Scoring leaders ====
List shows the ten best skaters based on the number of points during the regular season. If two or more skaters are tied (i.e. same number of points, goals and played games), all of the tied skaters are shown. Updated as of 3 March 2022.

GP = Games played; G = Goals; A = Assists; Pts = Points; +/– = Plus/Minus; PIM = Penalty Minutes

| Player | Team | GP | G | A | Pts | +/– | PIM |
|---|---|---|---|---|---|---|---|
| (Canada) David Morley | Frisk Asker | 40 | 17 | 45 | 62 | +4 | 10 |
| (Sweden) Kristian Jakobsson | Sparta Sarpsborg | 41 | 25 | 37 | 62 | +17 | 26 |
| (Norway) Patrick Thoresen | Storhamar | 34 | 20 | 28 | 48 | +20 | 39 |
| (Norway) Viktor Granholm | Frisk Asker | 41 | 29 | 17 | 46 | +11 | 20 |
| (Canada) Tyler Coulter | Stjernen | 39 | 18 | 27 | 45 | +13 | 18 |
| (Canada) Jarrett Burton | Stavanger Oilers | 40 | 19 | 25 | 44 | +21 | 20 |
| (United States) Daniel Kissel | Stavanger Oilers | 37 | 18 | 26 | 44 | +21 | 12 |
| (Sweden) Tobias Lindström | Vålerenga | 37 | 20 | 23 | 43 | +9 | 12 |
| (United States) Nicholas Dineen | Lillehammer | 41 | 15 | 28 | 43 | +6 | 16 |
| (United States) Patrick Newell | Stjernen | 38 | 19 | 24 | 43 | +17 | 10 |

Source: hockey.no

==== Leading goaltenders ====
The top five goaltenders based on goals against average. Updated as of 3 March 2022.

| Player | Team | GP | TOI | W | L | GA | SO | Sv% | GAA |
|---|---|---|---|---|---|---|---|---|---|
| (Norway) Henrik Holm | Stavanger Oilers | 36 | | 29 | 5 | 63 | 0 | 91.7 | 1.78 |
| (Canada) Jake Paterson | Sparta Sarpsborg | 33 | | 16 | 10 | 68 | 0 | 92.1 | 2.26 |
| (Norway) Tobias Breivold | Vålerenga | 24 | | 15 | 6 | 53 | 0 | 91.3 | 2.40 |
| (Norway) Jørgen Hanneborg | Stjernen | 30 | | 17 | 11 | 70 | 0 | 91.4 | 2.44 |
| (Sweden) Oliver Dackell | Lillehammer | 28 | | 12 | 11 | 70 | 0 | 90.1 | 2.66 |

Source: hockey.no

== Playoffs ==
After the regular season, the top eight teams will qualify for the playoffs. In the first and second rounds, the highest remaining seed will choose which of the two lowest remaining seeds to be matched against. In each round the higher-seeded team will be awarded home ice advantage. Each best-of-seven series will follow a 1–1–1–1–1–1–1 format: the higher-seeded team will play at home for games 1 and 3 (plus 5 and 7 if necessary), and the lower-seeded team at home for games 2, 4 and 6 (if necessary).

=== Bracket ===
Quarter-finals (best-of-7)
1 | Stavanger Oilers | 4
8 | Ringerike Panthers | 0
2 | Sparta Sarpsborg | 4
4 | Frisk Asker | 2
(Pairings are reseeded after the first round)
3 | Stjernen | 4
6 | Lillehammer | 3
5 | Vålerenga | 2
7 | Storhamar | 4

Semi-finals (best-of-7)
1 | Stavanger Oilers | 4
2 | Sparta Sarpsborg | 3
3 | Stjernen | 1
7 | Storhamar | 4

Finals (best-of-7)
1 | Stavanger Oilers | 4
7 | Storhamar | 0

=== Quarterfinals ===
Stavanger Oilers – Ringerike Panthers 4–0
| 13.03.2022 | Stavanger Oilers | Ringerike Panthers | 6-0 |
| 15.03.2022 | Ringerike Panthers | Stavanger Oilers | 0-7 |
| 17.03.2022 | Stavanger Oilers | Ringerike Panthers | 2-1 |
| 19.03.2022 | Ringerike Panthers | Stavanger Oilers | 1-5 |
Stavanger Oilers won the series 4–0

Sparta Sarpsborg – Frisk Asker 4–2
| 13.03.2022 | Sparta Sarpsborg | Frisk Asker | 5-2 |
| 15.03.2022 | Frisk Asker | Sparta Sarpsborg | 1-4 |
| 17.03.2022 | Sparta Sarpsborg | Frisk Asker | 0-4 |
| 19.03.2022 | Frisk Asker | Sparta Sarpsborg | 4-2 |
| 21.03.2022 | Sparta Sarpsborg | Frisk Asker | 5-1 |
| 23.03.2022 | Frisk Asker | Sparta Sarpsborg | 2-3 OT |
Sparta Sarpsborg won the series 4–2

Stjernen – Lillehammer 4–3
| 13.03.2022 | Stjernen | Lillehammer | 3-5 |
| 15.03.2022 | Lillehammer | Stjernen | 3-2 OT |
| 17.03.2022 | Stjernen | Lillehammer | 5-2 |
| 19.03.2022 | Lillehammer | Stjernen | 4-2 |
| 21.03.2022 | Stjernen | Lillehammer | 3-2 |
| 23.03.2022 | Lillehammer | Stjernen | 3-5 |
| 25.03.2022 | Stjernen | Lillehammer | 7-5 |
Stjernen won the series 4–3

Vålerenga – Storhamar 4–2
| 13.03.2022 | Vålerenga | Storhamar | 5-2 |
| 15.03.2022 | Storhamar | Vålerenga | 3-2 |
| 17.03.2022 | Vålerenga | Storhamar | 3-4 |
| 19.03.2022 | Storhamar | Vålerenga | 1-2 OT |
| 21.03.2022 | Vålerenga | Storhamar | 3-4 |
| 23.03.2022 | Storhamar | Vålerenga | 5-1 |
Storhamar won the series 4–2

=== Semifinals ===
Stavanger Oilers – Sparta Sarpsborg 4-3
| 28.03.2022 | Stavanger Oilers | Sparta Sarpsborg | 5-4 |
| 30.03.2022 | Sparta Sarpsborg | Stavanger Oilers | 3-2 |
| 01.04.2022 | Stavanger Oilers | Sparta Sarpsborg | 1-2 |
| 03.04.2022 | Sparta Sarpsborg | Stavanger Oilers | 1-2 |
| 05.04.2022 | Stavanger Oilers | Sparta Sarpsborg | 3-2 |
| 07.04.2022 | Sparta Sarpsborg | Stavanger Oilers | 2-1 OT |
| 09.04.2022 | Stavanger Oilers | Sparta Sarpsborg | 2-0 |
Stavanger Oilers lead the series 4–3

Stjernen – Storhamar 1-4
| 31.03.2022 | Storhamar | Stjernen | 5-2 |
| 02.04.2022 | Stjernen | Storhamar | 1-2 OT |
| 04.04.2022 | Stjernen | Storhamar | 2-1 |
| 06.04.2022 | Storhamar | Stjernen | 5-0 |
| 08.04.2022 | Stjernen | Storhamar | 2-3 |
Storhamar lead the series 4–1

=== Finals ===
| 18 April 2022; 19:00 CEST | Stavanger Oilers | 6–0 (2–0, 2–0, 2–0) score in the series: 1–0 | Storhamar | DNB Arena, Stavanger; Attendance: 3,790 |

Game reference

Henrik Holm
Goalies
Evan Buitenhuis
Referees:
Marcus Wannerstedt
Karl Vinnerborg
Linesmen:
Rune Bakken
Alexander Waldejer

| Burton (Østby) - 06:12 | 1–0 |
| Hoff (Kissel, Burton) (PP1) - 14:02 | 2–0 |
| Mauldin - 35:06 | 3–0 |
| Bordson (Klavestad, Søberg) - 36:15 | 4–0 |
| Kristiansen (Klavestad, Mauldin) - 41:41 | 5–0 |
| Whitney (Kissel, Karlsen) - 51:17 | 6–0 |

4 min
Penalties
12 min
41
Shots
22

| 20 April 2022; 19:00 CEST | Storhamar | 1–2 (0–0, 0–1, 1–1) score in the series: 0–2 | Stavanger Oilers | CC Amfi, Hamar; Attendance: 6,318 |

Game reference

Evan Buitenhuis
Goalies
Henrik Holm
Referees:
Christian Bo Persson
Karl Erik Robert Öberg Hallin
Linesmen:
Knut Einar Bråten
Håvar Dahl

| | 0–1 | 25:17 - Lefebvre (Whitney) |
| Thoresen (Olsen, Engebråten) - 45:49 | 1–1 |
| | 1–2 | 53:21 - Whitney (Kissel) |

35 min
Penalties
31 min
26
Shots
26

| 22 April 2022; 19:00 CEST | Stavanger Oilers | 3–2 (0–1, 3–0, 0–1) score in the series: 3–0 | Storhamar | DNB Arena, Stavanger; Attendance: 4,250 |

Game reference

Henrik Holm
Goalies
Evan Buitenhuis
Referees:
Karl Johan Marcus Vinnerborg
Christian Bo Persson
Linesmen:
Alexander Waldejer
Rune Solholm Bakken

| | 0–1 | 18:40 - Rønnild (Engebråten, Øksnes) |
| Bordson (Henriksen) - 24:22 | 1–1 |
| Kristiansen (Mauldin) - 34:20 | 2–1 |
| Kissel (Lefebvre, Sveum) - 35:47 | 3–1 |
| | 3–2 | 59:36 - Nicholls |

0 min
Penalties
0 min
38
Shots
18

| 24 April 2022; 19:00 CEST | Storhamar | 2–5 (1–1, 0–2, 1–2) score in the series: 0–5 | Stavanger Oilers | CC Amfi, Hamar; Attendance: 6,476 |

Game reference

Evan Buitenhuis
Goalies
Henrik Holm
Referees:
Karl Johan Marcus Vinnerborg
Christian Bo Persson
Linesmen:
Alexander Waldejer
Rune Solholm Bakken

| Olsen (Salsten, Rønnild) - 03:55 | 1–0 |
| | 1–1 | 12:47 - Kissel (Whitney, Burton) |
| | 1–2 | 22:10 - Whitney (Hoff, Klavestad) |
| | 1–3 | 39:43 - Mauldin (Rokseth, Klavestad) |
| | 1–4 | 42:02 - Strandborg (Karlsen) |
| | 1–5 | 53:16 - Burton (Kissel, Lefebvre) (PP1) |
| de La Rose (Olsen) - 58:41 | 2–5 |

8 min
Penalties
8 min
29
Shots
28

== Relegation round ==
The bottom two teams of the regular season faced two top teams of the First Division in the relegation round.

| Pos | Team | Pld | W | OTW | OTL | L | GF | GA | GD | Pts | Qualification |
|---|---|---|---|---|---|---|---|---|---|---|---|
| 1 | Manglerud Star | 6 | 3 | 1 | 1 | 1 | 27 | 17 | +10 | 12 | |
| 2 | Grüner | 6 | 3 | 1 | 1 | 1 | 18 | 14 | +4 | 12 | |
| 3 | Narvik | 6 | 3 | 1 | 0 | 2 | 16 | 15 | +1 | 11 | Relegation to First Division |
| 4 | Comet | 6 | 0 | 0 | 1 | 5 | 14 | 29 | −15 | 1 | Relegation to First Division |

Source: hockey.no
Rules for classification: 1) Points; 2) Head-to-head points.

== Final rankings ==
| Gold medal | Stavanger Oilers |
| Silver medal | Storhamar |
| Bronze medal | Sparta Sarpsborg |
| 4 | Stjernen |
| 5 | Frisk Asker |
| 6 | Vålerenga |
| 7 | Lillehammer |
| 8 | Ringerike Panthers |
| 9 | Manglerud Star |
| 10 | Grüner |
