= 2022–23 Fjordkraftligaen season =

- League: (Norway) Fjordkraftligaen
- Sport: Ice hockey
- Duration: 9 September 2022 – 17 April 2023
- Number of teams: 10
- TV partner(s): TV 2 Sport

Regular season
- League champions: Stavanger Oilers (7th title)

Playoffs
- Norwegian champions: Stavanger Oilers (9th title)

Eliteserien seasons
- ← 2021–22 2023–24 →

The 2022–23 Fjordkraftligaen was the 84th season of Norway's premier ice hockey league, Eliteserien, and the 3rd under the sponsorship name Fjordkraftligaen.

== Participating teams ==
Fjordkraftligaen teams

Team	City	Arena	Capacity
Frisk Asker	Asker	Askerhallen	2,400
Grüner	Oslo	Grünerhallen	500
Lillehammer IK	Lillehammer	Eidsiva Arena	3,197
Manglerud Star	Oslo	Manglerudhallen	1,050
Ringerike Panthers	Hønefoss	Schjongshallen	1,500
Sparta Sarpsborg	Sarpsborg	Sparta Amfi	3,450
Stavanger Oilers	Stavanger	DNB Arena	4,377
Stjernen	Fredrikstad	Stjernehallen	2,473
Storhamar	Hamar	CC Amfi	7,000
Vålerenga	Oslo	Nye Jordal Amfi	5,300

== Regular season ==
=== Standings ===
Pos	Team	Pld	W	OTW	OTL	L	GF	GA	GD	Pts	Qualification
1	Stavanger Oilers (C)	45	31	2	2	10	192	83	+109	99	Qualification to Fjordkraftligaen Play-offs
2	Storhamar	45	28	4	3	10	191	93	+98	95	Qualification to Fjordkraftligaen Play-offs
3	Vålerenga	45	25	7	5	8	162	100	+62	94	Qualification to Fjordkraftligaen Play-offs
4	Sparta Sarpsborg	45	24	8	2	11	148	99	+49	90	Qualification to Fjordkraftligaen Play-offs
5	Stjernen	45	27	2	5	11	186	122	+64	90	Qualification to Fjordkraftligaen Play-offs
6	Frisk Asker	45	21	4	4	16	146	144	+2	75	Qualification to Fjordkraftligaen Play-offs
7	Lillehammer	45	12	4	3	26	112	168	−56	47	Qualification to Fjordkraftligaen Play-offs
8	Manglerud Star (R)	45	10	1	3	31	92	192	−100	35	Qualification to Fjordkraftligaen Play-offs
9	Ringerike Panthers	45	8	2	6	29	102	180	−78	34	Relegation round
10	Grüner (R)	45	4	1	2	38	81	231	−150	16	Relegation round

Source: Hockey.no
Rules for classification: 1) Points; 2) Head-to-head points.
(C) Champion; (R) Relegated

== Playoffs ==
After the regular season, the top eight teams qualify for the playoffs. In the first and second rounds, the highest remaining seed will choose which of the two lowest remaining seeds to be matched against. In each round the higher-seeded team will be awarded home ice advantage. Each best-of-seven series will follow a 1–1–1–1–1–1–1 format: the higher-seeded team will play at home for games 1 and 3 (plus 5 and 7 if necessary), and the lower-seeded team at home for games 2, 4 and 6 (if necessary).

=== Bracket ===
Quarter-finals (best-of-7)
1	Stavanger Oilers	4
7	Lillehammer	0
2	Storhamar	4
8	Manglerud Star	0
(Pairings are reseeded after the first round)
3	Vålerenga	4
6	Frisk Asker	0
4	Sparta Sarpsborg	4
5	Stjernen	0

Semi-finals (best-of-7)
1	Stavanger Oilers	4
4	Sparta Sarpsborg	0
2	Storhamar	4
3	Vålerenga	2

Finals (best-of-7)
1	Stavanger Oilers	4
2	Storhamar	3

=== Quarterfinals ===
Stavanger Oilers – Lillehammer 4–0
03.03.2023	Stavanger Oilers	Lillehammer	11-1
05.03.2023	Lillehammer	Stavanger Oilers	1-4
07.03.2023	Stavanger Oilers	Lillehammer	13-0
09.03.2023	Lillehammer	Stavanger Oilers	1-8
Stavanger Oilers won the series 4–0

Vålerenga – Frisk Asker 4–0
03.03.2023	Vålerenga	Frisk Asker	5-2
05.03.2023	Frisk Asker	Vålerenga	2-3
07.03.2023	Vålerenga	Frisk Asker	6-2
09.03.2023	Frisk Asker	Vålerenga	4-6
Vålerenga won the series 4–0

Storhamar – Manglerud Star 4–0
03.03.2023	Storhamar	Manglerud Star	6-0
05.03.2023	Manglerud Star	Storhamar	0-8
07.03.2023	Storhamar	Manglerud Star	5-0
09.03.2023	Manglerud Star	Storhamar	1-12
Storhamar won the series 4–0

Sparta Sarpsborg – Stjernen 4–0
03.03.2023	Sparta Sarpsborg	Stjernen	2-1 OT
05.03.2023	Stjernen	Sparta Sarpsborg	3-4
07.03.2023	Sparta Sarpsborg	Stjernen	5-1
09.03.2023	Stjernen	Sparta Sarpsborg	3-4
Sparta Sarpsborg won the series 4–0

=== Semifinals ===
Stavanger Oilers – Sparta Sarpsborg 4–0
18.03.2023	Stavanger Oilers	Sparta Sarpsborg	2-0
20.03.2023	Sparta Sarpsborg	Stavanger Oilers	0-3
22.03.2023	Stavanger Oilers	Sparta Sarpsborg	2-1
24.03.2023	Sparta Sarpsborg	Stavanger Oilers	4-5
Stavanger Oilers won the series 4–0

Storhamar – Vålerenga 4–2
19.03.2023	Storhamar	Vålerenga	3-1
21.03.2023	Vålerenga	Storhamar	2-1
23.03.2023	Storhamar	Vålerenga	2-1
25.03.2023	Vålerenga	Storhamar	6-3
27.03.2023	Storhamar	Vålerenga	3-0
29.03.2023	Vålerenga	Storhamar	1-2
Storhamar won the series 4–2

=== Finals ===
Stavanger Oilers – Storhamar 4–3
03.04.2023	Stavanger Oilers	Storhamar	0-3
05.04.2023	Storhamar	Stavanger Oilers	3-2 OT
08.04.2023	Stavanger Oilers	Storhamar	5-4 OT
11.04.2023	Storhamar	Stavanger Oilers	1-3
13.04.2023	Stavanger Oilers	Storhamar	1-4
15.04.2023	Storhamar	Stavanger Oilers	0-3
17.04.2023	Stavanger Oilers	Storhamar	3-0
Stavanger Oilers won the series 4–3

Norwegian Champions
2023
Stavanger Oilers
9th title

== Relegation round ==
The bottom two teams of the regular season faced the two top teams of the First Division in the relegation round. Initially, only the top two teams of the relegation round would be qualified for the next season. However, after Manglerud Star lost their Elite License and were relegated to the third level of Norwegian ice hockey due to their financial situation, Comet were given their spot in Fjordkraftligaen as the third place finisher in the relegation round.

Pos	Team	Pld	W	OTW	OTL	L	GF	GA	GD	Pts	Qualification
1	Ringerike Panthers	6	3	0	1	2	18	17	+1	10	
2	Lørenskog	6	3	0	1	2	16	20	−4	10	
3	Comet	6	1	3	0	2	19	19	0	9	
4	Grüner (R)	6	2	0	1	3	19	16	+3	7	Relegation to First Division

Source: Hockey.no
Rules for classification: 1) Points; 2) Head-to-head points.
(R) Relegated
