= Erik Kristiansen =

Norwegian ice hockey player

- Born: 12 March 1961 (age 65) Furnes, NOR
- Height: 6 ft 0 in (183 cm)
- Weight: 192 lb (87 kg; 13 st 10 lb)
- Position: Centre
- Shot: Left
- Played for: Storhamar Dragons; Björklöven
- National team: Norway
- Playing career: 1977–1998

Erik Kristiansen (born 12 March 1961 in Furnes, Norway) is a former Norwegian ice hockey player.

== Playing career ==
He played 20 seasons with the Storhamar Dragons of Hamar, Norway. He also played 97 games for Norway's National team (IIHF World Championship and Winter Olympics). He was named the best Norwegian player in 1985, earning him the Golden Puck award.

During the 1987/88 season he was with Björklöven in the Swedish Elitserien where he reached the finals, losing to Färjestad.

He is Storhamar's all-time leading scorer with 509 goals and 406 assists in 649 games over 20 seasons.
