= Kristian Østby (ice hockey) =

- Born: 30 January 1996 (age 30) Sarpsborg, Norway
- Height: 1.98 m (6 ft 6 in)
- Weight: 98 kg (216 lb; 15 st 6 lb)
- Position: Defence
- Shoots: Left
- ELT team Former teams: Stavanger Oilers; Sparta Warriors
- National team: Norway
- NHL draft: Undrafted
- Playing career: 2014–present

Kristian Sjødahl Østby (born 30 January 1996) is a Norwegian professional ice hockey player who is a defenceman for the Stavanger Oilers of the EliteHockey Ligaen.

He represented Norway national team at the 2021 IIHF World Championship.

Medal record

Men's ice hockey

Representing Norway

World Championships
Bronze medal – third place	2026 Switzerland	
