= 1998–99 Eliteserien season =

Norwegian ice hockey season

The 1998–99 Eliteserien season was the 60th season of ice hockey in Norway. Ten teams participated in the league, and Valerenga Ishockey won the championship.

== Regular season ==
	Club	GP	W	T	L	GF–GA	Pts
1.	Vålerenga Ishockey	44	34	7	3	219:93	74*
2.	Storhamar Ishockey	44	30	6	8	196:104	66
3.	Stjernen	44	27	3	14	190:112	57
4.	Trondheim IK	44	20	7	17	153:136	46*
5.	Frisk Asker	44	20	3	21	171:145	43
6.	Sparta Sarpsborg	44	20	3	21	141:138	42
7.	Lillehammer IK	44	19	3	22	154:185	40*
8.	Manglerud Star Ishockey	44	15	5	24	140:159	35
9.	Viking Hockey	44	8	2	34	98:254	18
10.	Furuset IF	44	6	3	35	97:233	15

Source: Elite Prospects

== Playoffs ==
Semi-finals
Vålerenga Ishockey	3
Stjernen	0
Storhamar Ishockey	3
Trondheim IK	2

Final
Vålerenga Ishockey	3
Storhamar Ishockey	2
Third place
not played

== Relegation ==
- Gjøvik - Viking Hockey 1:2 (2:4, 5:3, 2:3)
