= Arne Bergseng =

Norwegian ice hockey player

Arne Bergseng (born 22 March 1961) is a former Norwegian ice hockey player. He was born in Lillehammer, Norway, and is the brother of Lars Bergseng. He played for the Norwegian national ice hockey team at the 1984 Winter Olympics.
