= 1997–98 Eliteserien season =

Norwegian ice hockey season

The 1997–98 Eliteserien season was the 59th season of ice hockey in Norway. Ten teams participated in the league, and Valerenga Ishockey won the championship.

== Regular season ==
	Club	GP	W	T	L	GF–GA	Pts
1.	Vålerenga Ishockey	44	34	2	8	240:94	70
2.	Storhamar Ishockey	44	32	3	9	213:92	67
3.	Stjernen	44	23	4	17	172:149	50
4.	Sparta Sarpsborg	44	23	3	18	165:152	49
5.	Frisk Asker	44	21	7	16	183:147	49
6.	Lillehammer IK	44	22	5	17	163:139	49
7.	Manglerud Star Ishockey	44	18	3	23	172:179	39
8.	Trondheim IK	44	15	5	24	159:181	35
9.	Furuset IF	44	13	3	28	155:218	29
10.	Lørenskog IK	44	1	1	42	79:350	3

== Playoffs ==
Semi-finals
Vålerenga Ishockey	3
Sparta Sarpsborg	0
Storhamar Ishockey	3
Stjernen	0

Final
Vålerenga Ishockey	3
Storhamar Ishockey	0
Third place
not played

== Relegation ==
- Jar IL - Furuset IF 1:2 (2:1, 2:7, 3:7)
