= 2001–02 Eliteserien season =

Norwegian ice hockey season

The 2001–02 Eliteserien season was the 63rd season of ice hockey in Norway. Ten teams participated in the league, and Frisk Asker won the championship.

== Regular season ==
	Club	GP	W	T	L	GF–GA	Pts
1.	Vålerenga Ishockey	42	34	3	5	230:92	71
2.	Frisk Asker	42	31	3	8	194:106	65
3.	Storhamar Ishockey	42	29	3	10	189:101	61
4.	Lillehammer IK	42	21	3	18	168:165	45
5.	Trondheim IK	42	19	3	20	136:144	41
6.	Sparta Sarpsborg	42	17	4	21	146:167	38
7.	Manglerud Star Ishockey	42	14	8	20	112:134	36
8.	Stjernen	42	14	2	26	123:150	30
9.	Furuset IF	42	9	4	29	98:199	22
10.	Lørenskog IK	42	5	1	36	96:234	11

Source: Elite Prospects

== Playoffs ==
Quarter-finals
Lillehammer IK	2
Trondheim IK	1
Storhamar Ishockey	2
Sparta Sarpsborg	0

Semi-finals
Frisk Asker	3
Lillehammer IK	0
Vålerenga Ishockey	1
Storhamar Ishockey	3

Final
Frisk Asker	3
Storhamar Ishockey	2

== Relegation ==
	Club	GP	W	T	L	GF–GA	Pts
1.	Stjernen	10	8	1	1	50:26	17
2.	Manglerud Star Ishockey	10	7	1	2	39:15	15
3.	Lørenskog IK	10	5	2	3	41:38	12
4.	Furuset IF	10	3	2	5	30:38	8
5.	IK Comet	10	2	1	7	36:62	5
6.	Hasle-Løren Idrettslag	10	1	1	8	34:51	3
