= Lars Moe =

Norwegian veterinarian (born 1951)

Lars Moe (born 30 April 1951) is a Norwegian veterinarian and university administrator.

He was born in Sandefjord and took the dr.scient. degree in 1986. He was hired at the Norwegian School of Veterinary Science in 1978, became professor in 1998, and was rector there from 2002. He stepped down in 2010 and his former deputy, Yngvild Wasteson, took over.

Academic offices
Preceded by Hallstein Grønstøl	Rector of the Norwegian School of Veterinary Science; 2002–2010	Succeeded by Yngvild Wasteson
