= Norway men's national ice hockey team =

Men's national ice hockey team representing Norway

Norway
- Nickname: Isbjørnene (The Polar Bears)
- Association: NIHF
- Head coach: Petter Thoresen
- Assistants: Jonas Holøs; Ole-Kristian Tollefsen
- Captain: Andreas Martinsen
- Most games: Martin Røymark (359)
- Top scorer: Patrick Thoresen (91)
- Most points: Patrick Thoresen (233)
- Team colors
- IIHF code: NOR
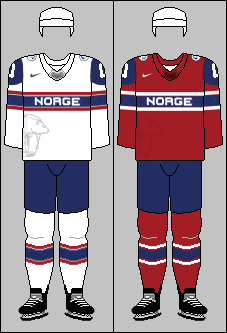

Ranking
- Current IIHF: 11 ▲1 (3 June 2026)
- Highest IIHF: 8 (2012)
- Lowest IIHF: 21 (2004)

First international
- Czechoslovakia 7–0 Norway (London, England; 17 February 1937)

Biggest win
- Norway 24–0 Belgium (Sofia, Bulgaria; 5 March 1975); Norway 25–1 China (Debrecen, Hungary; 22 April 2005)

Biggest defeat
- Finland 20–1 Norway (Hämeenlinna, Finland; 12 March 1947)

Olympics
- Appearances: 12 (first in 1952)

IIHF World Championships
- Appearances: 72 (first in 1937)
- Best result: Bronze: (2026)

International record (W–L–T)
- 484–806–112

Medal record

World Championship
Bronze medal – third place	2026 Switzerland	

The Norway men's national ice hockey team is the national ice hockey team from Norway that participates at the IIHF World Championships. The team is governed by the Norwegian Ice Hockey Association and is coached by Petter Thoresen.

== History ==
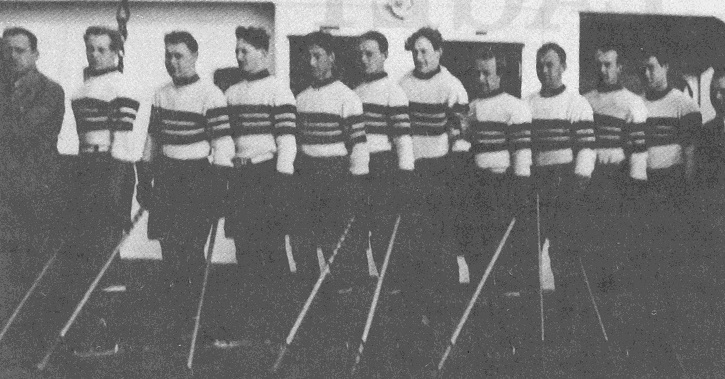
Norway prior to the 1937 World Championships, their first international tournament. They finished in ninth place.

The Norwegian Ice Hockey Association (NIHA) was founded in 1934 and, adopting the international rules and regulations of ice hockey, became a member of the International Ice Hockey Federation in 1935. Poor finances delayed the formation of a national team until 1937, and continued to hamper its development in the years prior to World War II. After missing out on the 1935 World Championships and 1936 Winter Olympics, the NIHF managed to raise enough funds to send a team to London for the 1937 World Championships. The national ice hockey team thus played its first game on 17 February 1937, losing 0–7 to Czechoslovakia, and was eliminated from the competition following a 2–13 loss to Switzerland. Norway also took part in the next tournament in 1938, but was unable to participate in 1939. Results remained meagre throughout the pre-war years; of the nine international fixtures contested between 1937 and 1940, the closest Norway came to winning was 3–4 in the first game against Sweden, on 20 January 1939.

After the war, ice hockey in Norway accelerated as new teams formed and improvements in infrastructure were made. The opening of the Jordal Amfi in Oslo made Norway's facilities state of the art. Results began to improve on the international stage, though not before Norway had endured its worst defeat ever at the hands of Finland in 1947.

The period from 1949 to 1953 has been viewed as a "golden age" in the history of the national team, beginning with the maiden victory, a 2–0 win over Belgium at the 1949 World Championships. In 1951, the NIHF appointed Canadian Bud McEachern as head coach. McEachern brought a physical style which suited the players of the generation well, and at the 1951 World Championships, Norway defeated the United States and Great Britain to finish fourth overall. Norway's inaugural Olympic tournament, was as host nation of the 1952 Winter Olympics. In 1953, Norway was the first Western nation to play the Soviet Union, overshadowed by the death of Joseph Stalin shortly after the team's arrival in Moscow.

Norway would continue during the 1950s to challenge the strongest national hockey teams. From the 1960s, the sport became more popular in the nation but national team achievements would decline as mild winters did not result in government support to construct artificial ice rinks to replace what had traditionally been relied on in the past due to weather conditions. NIHA president Tore Johannessen managed Norway at the 1962 Ice Hockey World Championships. After the 1965 World Championships, Norway was no longer allowed to compete at the highest level, and the NIHF resigned itself to competing at the top of Pool B instead. Qualifying for the Winter Olympics was still within reach, however, and Norway managed to do so in both 1964 and 1968.

Norway would be relegated to Pool C after finishing in last place in Pool B of the 1972 World Championships. The NIHF was forced to revise its objectives; not to return to Pool A, but merely to survive in Pool B. The goal of qualifying for the Winter Olympics remained throughout this period, but after another stint in Pool C in 1975, the ice hockey tournament at the 1976 Winter Olympics went ahead without Norway's participation.

In the 1970s, the unwillingness of the government to support the sport with improved training facilities encouraged a growing reluctance among players to represent Norway internationally. This trend was finally reversed under the leadership of Georg Smefjell and Olav Dalsøren from 1978 to 1980. Smefjell and Dalsøren succeeded in reestablishing Norway competing internationally. At the 1979 World Championships, Norway finished fourth in Pool B and qualified for the 1980 Winter Olympics in Lake Placid. There, the team showed encouraging signs for the future, despite losing heavily against the top tier nations and eventually coming away from the tournament with only a single point.

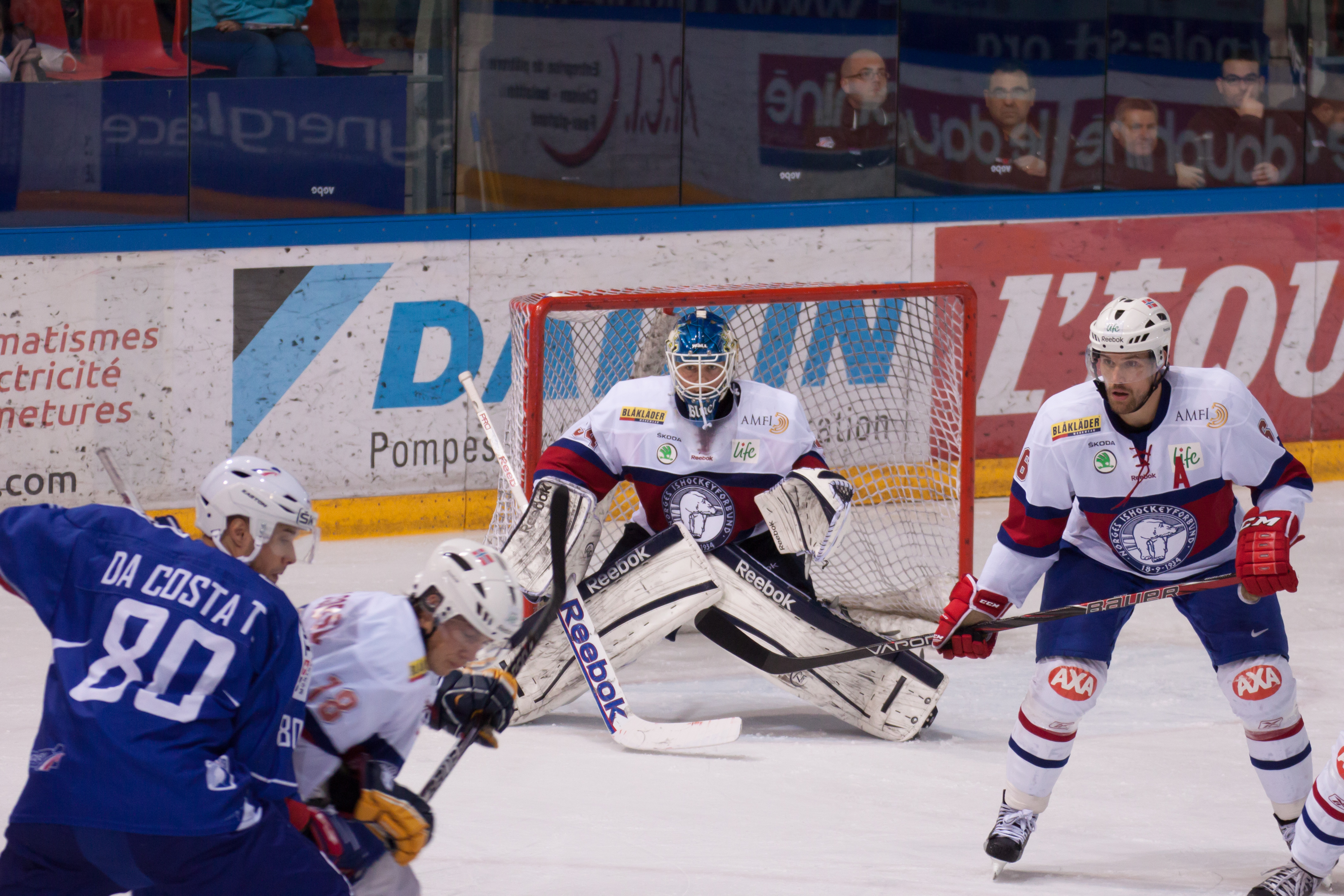
Game between France and Norway at Patinoire Pôle Sud in 2013.

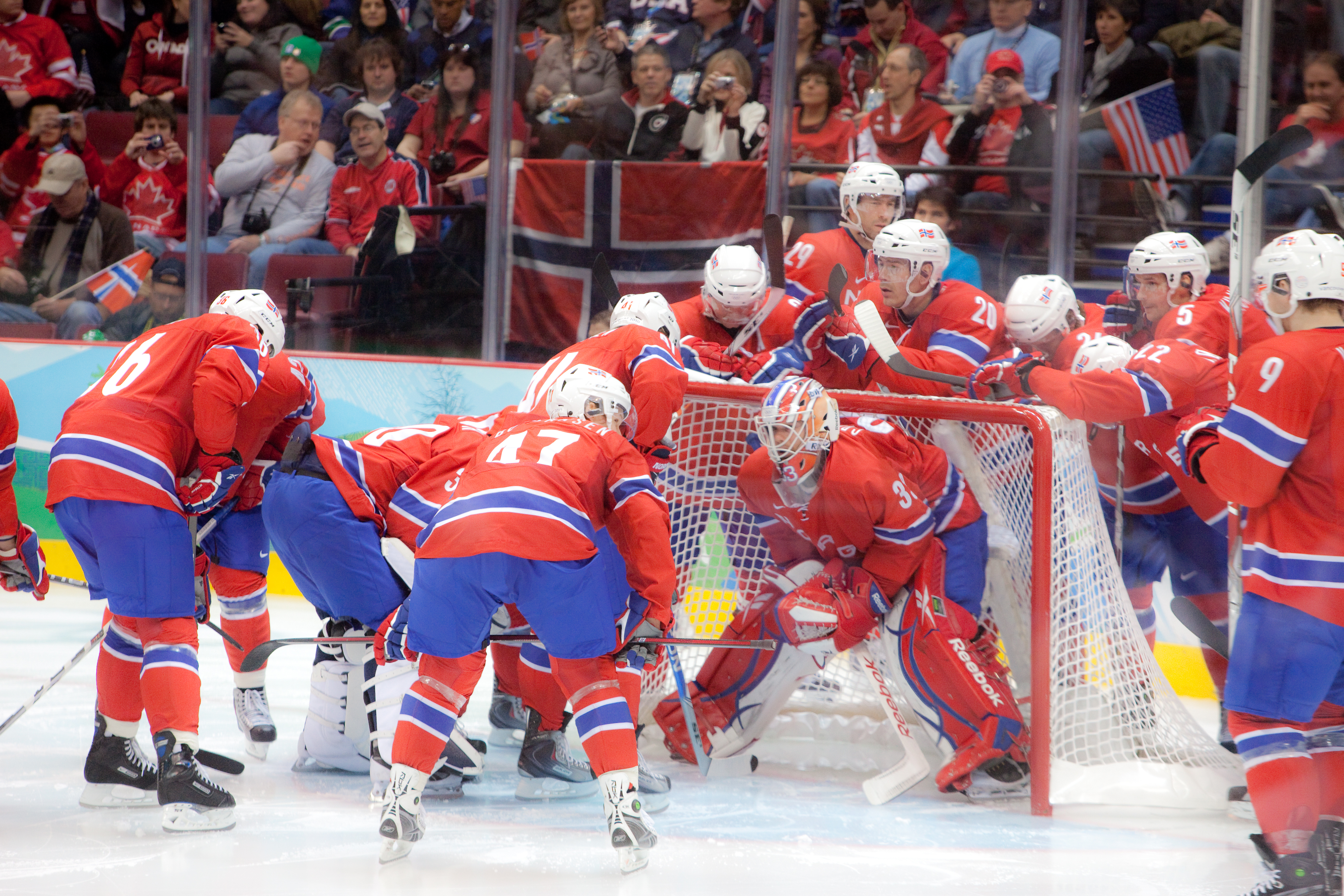
Norwegian players prior to a game during the 2010 Winter Olympics, where they finished in 12th place.

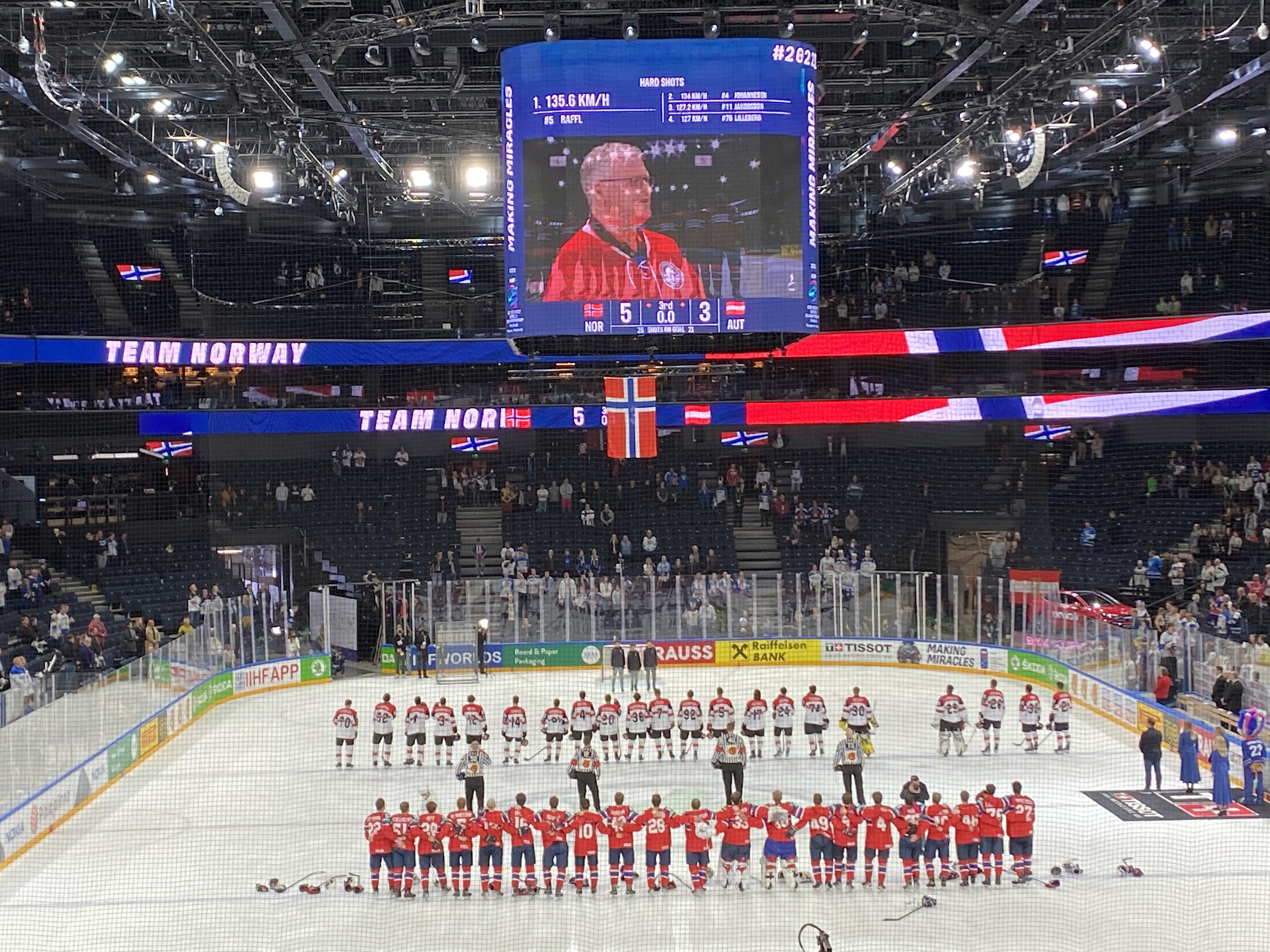
Norwegian team's victory ceremony in at the 2022 World Championships

The appointment of Ronald Pettersson as head coach in 1980 heralded an era of Swedish influence on Norway's international ice hockey. For the next nine years, four Swedish coaches in a row took charge of a team that proved to be highly unstable. For Pettersson, the 1981 World Championships were a disappointment. Wins against Yugoslavia and Japan were barely enough to avoid relegation from Pool B. His successor, Arne Strömberg, experienced similar difficulties. At the 1982 World Championships, an otherwise strong performance was blighted by losses against newly promoted China and Austria.

The next Swedish import was Hans Westberg in 1982, whose unorthodox methods lead Norway to the 1984 Winter Olympics. Expectations ahead of the Olympic tournament were only partially met, the 3–3 draw against the United States being the most notable result. The following season, while initially promising, ended in catastrophe at the 1985 World Championships as Norway dropped out of Pool B for the third time.

Norway stabilized itself in the lower half of Pool A in the 1990s, but the team was relegated again in 1997. After a spell with Swedish coach Leif Boork, Roy Johansen was hired in 2001. A new era of slow, but steady, growth began and Norway climbed thirteen places in the IIHF World Ranking during Johansen's reign, from a 21st place in 2004, to an 8th place in 2012. Johansen stepped down as head coach in 2016 and was replaced by Petter Thoresen.

In 2026, Petter Thoresen led Norway to historic wins against Sweden, Czechia, and Denmark, to finished 2nd in group A and advance to the quarter finals. Norway would beat Latvia 2–0 already securing Norway's best ever finish. Following a 6–0 loss to the Swiss, Norway would earn the country's first medal, a bronze, with an overtime win against Canada.

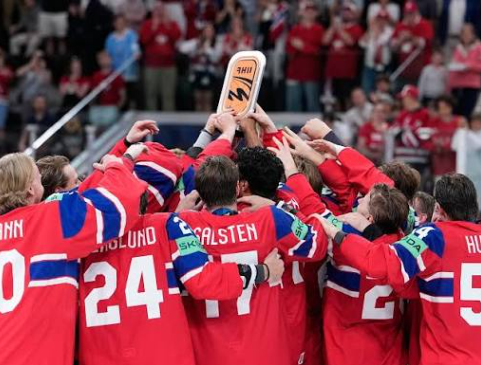
Norway's 2026 ice hockey team lifting the bronze IIHF trophy

== Tournament record ==
=== Olympic record ===
Games	GP	W	OW	T	OL	L	GF	GA	Coach	Captain	Finish	Rank
(Norway) 1952 Oslo	8	0	0	0	0	8	15	46	Bud McEachern		Round-robin	9th
(Italy) 1956 Cortina d'Ampezzo	did not participate											
(United States) 1960 Squaw Valley	did not participate											
(Austria) 1964 Innsbruck	7	5	0	0	0	2	40	19	Rolf Kirkvaag		Consolation round (group B)	10th
(France) 1968 Grenoble	6	3	0	0	0	3	16	18	Egil Bjerklund		Consolation round (group B)	11th
(Japan) 1972 Sapporo	5	3	0	0	0	2	17	27	Ake Brask		Consolation round	8th
(Austria) 1976 Innsbruck	did not participate											
(United States) 1980 Lake Placid	5	0	0	1	0	4	9	36	Ronald Pettersson, Olav Dalsøren		First round	11th
(Socialist Federal Republic of Yugoslavia) 1984 Sarajevo	7	1	0	1	0	5	15	43	Hans Westberg		First round	12th
(Canada) 1988 Calgary	6	0	0	1	0	5	18	38	Lenhart Åhlberg, Tore Jobs		11th place game	12th
(France) 1992 Albertville	6	1	0	0	0	5	12	40	Bengt Olsson, Tore Jobs		9th place match	9th
(Norway) 1994 Lillehammer	7	1	0	0	0	6	11	26	Bengt Olsson, Tore Jobs		11th place match	11th
(Japan) 1998 Nagano	did not qualify											
(United States) 2002 Salt Lake City	did not qualify											
(Italy) 2006 Turin	did not qualify											
(Canada) 2010 Vancouver	4	0	0	–	1	3	8	23	Roy Johansen	Tommy Jakobsen	Qualification playoffs	10th
(Russia) 2014 Sochi	4	0	0	–	0	4	3	16		Ole-Kristian Tollefsen	Qualification playoffs	12th
(South Korea) 2018 Pyeongchang	5	0	1	–	1	3	5	18	Petter Thoresen	Jonas Holøs	Quarter-finals	8th
(China) 2022 Beijing	did not qualify											
(Italy) 2026 Milan and Cortina	did not qualify											
(France) 2030 French Alps	Future event											

=== World Championship ===
- 1937 – 9th place
- 1938 – 13th place
- 1949 – 8th place
- 1950 – 6th place
- 1951 – 4th place
- 1952 – 9th place
- 1954 – 8th place
- 1956 – 12th place (2nd in "Pool B")
- 1958 – 7th place
- 1959 – 8th place
- 1961 – 9th place (Won "Pool B" after qualification)
- 1962 – 5th place
- 1963 – 9th place (Won "Pool B")
- 1964 – 10th place (2nd in "Pool B" after qualification)
- 1965 – 8th place
- 1966 – 12th place (4th in "Pool B")
- 1967 – 11th place (3rd in "Pool B")
- 1968 – 11th place (3rd in "Pool B" after qualification)
- 1969 – 11th place (5th in "Pool B")
- 1970 – 9th place (3rd in "Pool B")
- 1971 – 10th place (4th in "Pool B")
- 1972 – 13th place (7th in "Pool B")
- 1973 – 15th place (Won "Pool C")
- 1974 – 13th place (7th in "Pool B")
- 1975 – 15th place (Won "Pool C")
- 1976 – 11th place (3rd in "Pool B")
- 1977 – 12th place (4th in "Pool B")
- 1978 – 14th place (6th in "Pool B")
- 1979 – 12th place (4th in "Pool B")
- 1981 – 14th place (6th in "Pool B")
- 1982 – 12th place (4th in "Pool B")
- 1983 – 12th place (4th in "Pool B")
- 1985 – 15th place (7th in "Pool B")
- 1986 – 17th place (Won "Pool C")
- 1987 – 10th place (2nd in "Pool B")
- 1989 – 9th place (Won "Pool B")
- 1990 – 8th place
- 1991 – 10th place (2nd in "Pool B")
- 1992 – 10th place
- 1993 – 9th place
- 1994 – 11th place
- 1995 – 10th place
- 1996 – 10th place
- 1997 – 12th place
- 1998 – 21st place (5th in "Pool B")
- 1999 – 12th place
- 2000 – 10th place
- 2001 – 15th place
- 2002 – 22nd place (3rd in "Group B")
- 2003 – 20th place (2nd in "Group B")
- 2004 – 20th place (2nd in "Group A")
- 2005 – 17th place (Won "Group A")
- 2006 – 11th place
- 2007 – 14th place
- 2008 – 8th place
- 2009 – 11th place
- 2010 – 9th place
- 2011 – 6th place
- 2012 – 8th place
- 2013 – 10th place
- 2014 – 12th place
- 2015 – 11th place
- 2016 – 10th place
- 2017 – 11th place
- 2018 – 13th place
- 2019 – 12th place
- 2020 – Cancelled due to the COVID-19 pandemic
- 2021 – 13th place
- 2022 – 13th place
- 2023 – 13th place
- 2024 – 11th place
- 2025 – 12th place
- 2026 – Bronze
- 2027 –

== Team ==
=== Current roster ===
Roster for the 2026 IIHF World Championship.

Head coach: Petter Thoresen

No.	Pos.	Name	Height	Weight	Birthdate	Team
4	D	Johannes Johannesen	1.81 m (5 ft 11 in)	85 kg (187 lb)	1 March 1997 (age 29)	(Finland) Lahti Pelicans
6	D	Victor Kopperstad	1.88 m (6 ft 2 in)	88 kg (194 lb)	6 February 2006 (age 20)	(Sweden) Mora IK
8	F	Mikkel Øby Olsen	1.79 m (5 ft 10 in)	78 kg (172 lb)	22 June 2002 (age 24)	(Sweden) IK Oskarshamn
12	F	Noah Steen	1.85 m (6 ft 1 in)	86 kg (190 lb)	16 August 2004 (age 22)	(Sweden) Örebro HK
13	F	Petter Vesterheim	1.81 m (5 ft 11 in)	80 kg (180 lb)	30 September 2004 (age 22)	(Sweden) Malmö Redhawks
17	F	Eirik Salsten	1.85 m (6 ft 1 in)	88 kg (194 lb)	17 June 1994 (age 32)	(Germany) Iserlohn Roosters
18	F	Thomas Olsen	1.86 m (6 ft 1 in)	92 kg (203 lb)	25 June 1995 (age 31)	(Finland) Jukurit
19	F	Håvard Østrem Salsten	1.88 m (6 ft 2 in)	92 kg (203 lb)	19 August 2000 (age 26)	(Sweden) Djurgårdens IF
20	F	Mathias Emilio Pettersen	1.80 m (5 ft 11 in)	82 kg (181 lb)	3 April 2000 (age 26)	(United States) Texas Stars
21	F	Mikkel Eriksen	1.80 m (5 ft 11 in)	85 kg (187 lb)	13 September 2007 (age 19)	(Sweden) Färjestad BK
22	F	Martin Rønnild	1.86 m (6 ft 1 in)	95 kg (209 lb)	24 January 1996 (age 30)	(Norway) Storhamar Hockey
24	F	Jacob Berglund	1.85 m (6 ft 1 in)	92 kg (203 lb)	17 November 1991 (age 34)	(Norway) Storhamar Hockey
26	F	Patrick Elvsveen	1.76 m (5 ft 9 in)	84 kg (185 lb)	16 September 2002 (age 24)	(Norway) Stavanger Oilers
27	F	Andreas Martinsen – **C**	1.90 m (6 ft 3 in)	105 kg (231 lb)	13 June 1990 (age 36)	(Norway) Storhamar Hockey
28	F	Michael Brandsegg-Nygård	1.84 m (6 ft 0 in)	94 kg (207 lb)	5 October 2005 (age 20)	(United States) Detroit Red Wings
29	D	Kristian Østby	1.98 m (6 ft 6 in)	98 kg (216 lb)	30 January 1996 (age 30)	(Norway) Stavanger Oilers
30	G	Tobias Normann	1.86 m (6 ft 1 in)	85 kg (187 lb)	3 August 2001 (age 25)	(Sweden) Frölunda HC
32	G	Mathias Schjerpen Arnkværn	1.86 m (6 ft 1 in)	87 kg (192 lb)	7 November 2003 (age 22)	(Norway) Vålerenga Ishockey
37	F	Markus Vikingstad	1.94 m (6 ft 4 in)	96 kg (212 lb)	27 October 1999 (age 26)	(Germany) Eisbären Berlin
40	G	Henrik Haukeland	1.88 m (6 ft 2 in)	93 kg (205 lb)	6 December 1994 (age 31)	(Germany) Straubing Tigers
43	D	Max Krogdahl – **A**	1.88 m (6 ft 2 in)	93 kg (205 lb)	21 October 1998 (age 27)	(Sweden) Skellefteå AIK
44	F	Tinus Luc Koblar	1.91 m (6 ft 3 in)	88 kg (194 lb)	21 July 2007 (age 19)	(Sweden) Leksands IF
47	D	Adrian Saxrud-Danielsen	1.90 m (6 ft 3 in)	93 kg (205 lb)	27 September 1992 (age 34)	(Norway) Storhamar Hockey
49	D	Christian Kåsastul – **A**	1.78 m (5 ft 10 in)	86 kg (190 lb)	9 April 1997 (age 29)	(Norway) Frisk Asker Ishockey
54	D	Sander Hurrod	1.85 m (6 ft 1 in)	85 kg (187 lb)	2 April 2000 (age 26)	(Norway) Storhamar Hockey
71	F	Eskild Bakke Olsen	1.87 m (6 ft 2 in)	93 kg (205 lb)	19 March 2002 (age 24)	(Sweden) Linköping HC
72	D	Stian Solberg	1.89 m (6 ft 2 in)	92 kg (203 lb)	29 December 2005 (age 20)	(United States) Anaheim Ducks

=== Individual all-time records ===
Still active players are highlighted

==== Most matches played ====
Player	Time	Matches	Club on debut
Tommy Jakobsen (D)	1992–2010	139	Furuset
Mats Trygg (D)	1999–2022	122	Manglerud Star
Jim Marthinsen (G)	1980–1995	114	Vålerenga
Thor Martinsen (D)	1964–1980	113	Frisk Tigers
Per-Åge Skrøder (F)	1999–2017	113	Lillehammer
Mads Hansen (F)	2000–2015	110	Storhamar
Erik Kristiansen (F)	1983–1994	97	Storhamar
Ole Eskild Dahlstrøm (F)	1989–2005	96	Furuset
Petter Thoresen (F)	1980–1995	96	Vålerenga
Petter Salsten (D)	1987–1995	92	Furuset
Tore Vikingstad (F)	1995–2010	88	Stjernen
Trond Magnussen (F)	1992–2004	88	Stjernen
Ørjan Løvdal (F)	1983–1995	83	Stjernen
Marius Trygg (F)	1999–2016	82	Manglerud Star
Robert Schistad (G)	1991–2000	82	Viking
Morten Ask (F)	2000–2019	82	Vålerenga

Last updated: 8 June 2025
Source: hockey.no

=== Other notable players ===
- Geir Hoff
- Ron 'Ole' Bakerson
- Martin Knold
- Åge Ellingsen
- Roy Johansen
- Jenson Stott
- Bjørn "Botta" Skaare
- Espen "Shampo" Knutsen
- Morten Ask
- Anders Myrvold
- Ole-Kristian Tollefsen
- **Patrick Thoresen**
- **Mats Zuccarello Aasen**

Note: Still active players are bolded

== All-time record ==
Updated as of 31 May 2026. Defunct teams are listed in italics.

Opponent	Played	Won	Drawn	Lost	GF	GA	GD
Austria	55	32	5	18	200	141	+59
Belarus	39	12	4	23	91	114	−23
Belgium	5	5	0	0	58	7	+51
Bulgaria	5	4	1	0	31	11	+20
Canada	86	6	4	76	150	495	−345
China	11	9	1	1	93	20	+73
Croatia	4	4	0	0	36	5	+31
Czechia	33	2	2	29	38	124	−86
Czechoslovakia	18	0	0	18	23	141	−118
Denmark	101	49	9	43	325	258	+63
East Germany	68	12	4	52	200	363	−163
Estonia	2	1	0	1	4	2	+2
Finland	97	8	5	84	147	494	−347
France	101	60	14	27	341	234	+107
Germany	50	14	2	34	147	243	−96
Great Britain	21	16	1	4	113	55	+58
Hungary	31	18	3	10	110	73	+37
Italy	47	27	3	17	171	132	+39
Japan	38	16	8	14	159	131	+28
Kazakhstan	8	3	1	4	22	20	+2
Latvia	45	18	0	27	113	141	−28
Lithuania	3	2	0	1	15	8	+7
Netherlands	42	25	6	11	200	130	+70
Poland	77	31	7	39	243	316	−73
Romania	31	15	3	13	134	112	+22
Russia	18	1	1	16	25	75	−50
Serbia and Montenegro	1	1	0	0	21	0	+21
Slovakia	38	7	2	29	67	145	−78
Slovenia	17	9	1	7	54	44	+10
South Korea	6	6	0	0	31	6	+25
Soviet Union	13	0	0	13	14	115	−101
Spain	1	1	0	0	18	3	+15
Sweden	97	3	11	83	142	529	−387
Switzerland	77	26	5	46	221	292	−71
Ukraine	9	3	1	5	26	27	−1
United States	45	5	3	37	111	252	−141
Yugoslavia	28	18	5	5	155	97	+58
Total	1 352	460	112	786	4 021	5 335	−1 314

== Uniform evolution ==
National team jerseys

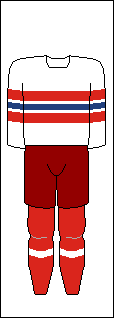
1937

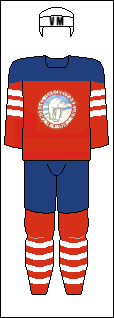
1952–1963

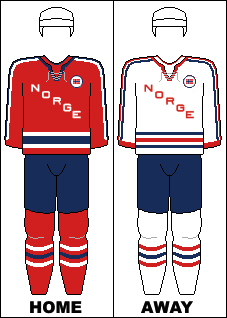
1964–1969

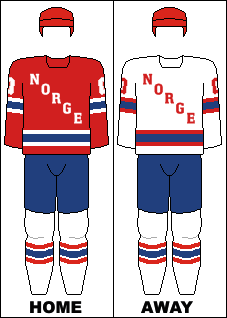
1973–1977

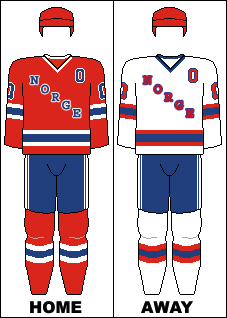
1978–1983

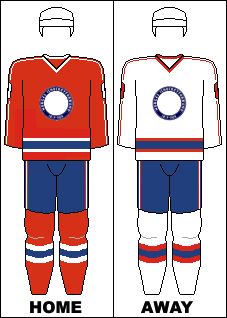
1985–1987

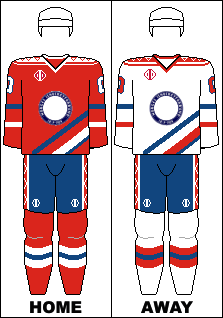
1989–1990

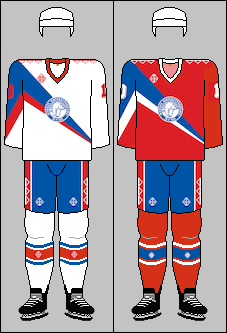
1990–1994

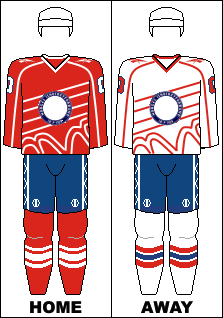
1995

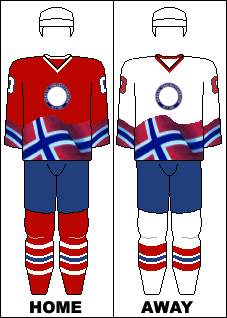
1996–1997

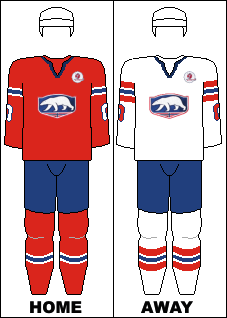
1998

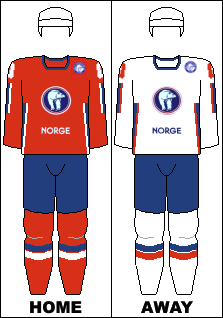
2006–2008

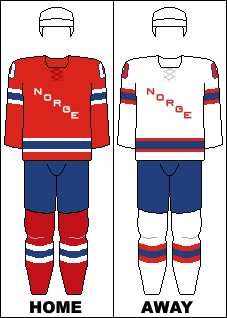
2014 Olympics

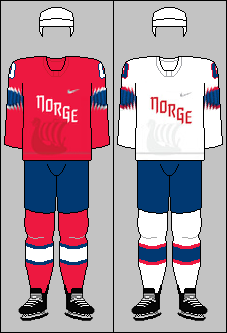
2018 Olympics

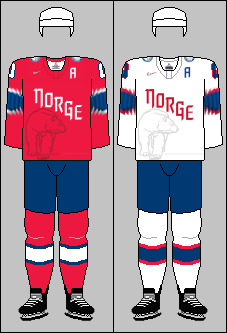
2018–2021

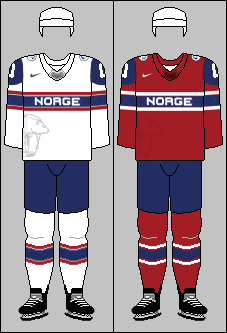
2022–
