= 2000–01 Eliteserien season =

Norwegian ice hockey season

The 2000–01 Eliteserien season was the 62nd season of ice hockey in Norway. Ten teams participated in the league, and Valerenga Ishockey won the championship.

== Regular season ==
	Club	GP	W	T	L	GF–GA	Pts
1.	Storhamar Ishockey	42	37	2	3	214:74	76
2.	Vålerenga Ishockey	42	34	1	7	262:91	69
3.	Frisk Asker	42	30	1	11	218:109	61
4.	Trondheim IK	42	22	2	18	163:148	46
5.	Manglerud Star Ishockey	42	20	4	18	123:116	44
6.	Stjernen	42	19	2	21	136:154	40
7.	Sparta Sarpsborg	42	17	0	25	118:152	34
8.	Lillehammer IK	42	12	1	29	92:158	25
9.	Lørenskog IK	42	8	0	34	86:226	16
10.	Furuset IF	42	4	1	37	77:261	9

== Playoffs ==
Semi-finals
Vålerenga Ishockey	3
Trondheim IK	0
Storhamar Ishockey	0
Frisk Asker	3

Final
Vålerenga Ishockey	3
Frisk Asker	0
Third place
not played
