= 1999–2000 Eliteserien season =

Norwegian ice hockey season

The 1999–2000 Eliteserien season was the 61st season of ice hockey in Norway. Nine teams participated in the league, and Storhamar Ishockey won the championship.

== Regular season ==
	Club	GP	W	T	L	GF–GA	Pts
1.	Vålerenga Ishockey	38	32	1	5	219:75	65
2.	Storhamar Ishockey	38	27	1	10	167:81	55
3.	Frisk Asker	38	27	0	11	172:109	54
4.	Sparta Sarpsborg	38	20	1	17	123:117	41
5.	Trondheim IK	38	18	2	18	119:134	40
6.	Stjernen	38	15	4	19	99:119	34
7.	Manglerud Star Ishockey	38	12	1	25	105:155	25
8.	Lillehammer IK	38	7	2	29	84:157	16
9.	Lørenskog IK	38	5	2	31	63:204	12

Source: Elite Prospects

== Playoffs ==
Semi-finals
Vålerenga Ishockey	3
Frisk Asker	0
Storhamar Ishockey	3
Sparta Sarpsborg	0

Final
Vålerenga Ishockey	1
Storhamar Ishockey	3
Third place
not played
