= Storhamar Hockey =

Norwegian ice hockey team

- City: Hamar, Norway
- League: EliteHockey Ligaen
- Founded: 1957; 69 years ago
- Home arena: CC Amfi
- Colors: Yellow, blue
- General manager: Jostein Smeby
- Head coach: Petter Thoresen
- Captain: Jacob Berglund
- Affiliates: Storhamar Yngres (1. div)
- Website: sil.no

Franchise history
- 1957-1998: Storhamar IL
- 1998-2015: Storhamar Dragons
- 2015-present: Storhamar Hockey

Championships
- Regular season titles: 8
- Playoff championships: 1995, 1996, 1997, 2000, 2004, 2008, 2018, 2024, 2025, 2026

Storhamar Hockey, commonly known as Storhamar Ishockey or often referred to by its initials SIL, is a Norwegian professional ice hockey team based in Hamar, Norway. The club currently plays in the EliteHockey Ligaen, the highest level of Norwegian hockey. The club has won eight regular season titles and seven national championships since its founding on 18 March 1957. Storhamar play their home games in the CC Amfi. The club also includes the largest junior department in Norwegian ice hockey. The team colours are yellow and blue.

== History ==
The 1952 Winter Olympics inspired local Hamar youth to form a hockey club in the area. The first ice rink was constructed in 1955, and Storhamar was formally accepted into the Norwegian Ice Hockey Association two years later.

To date, the club has won the Norwegian Championships (playoffs) seven times, 1995, 1996, 1997, 2000, 2004, 2008 and 2018 and 2024

The most notable player in franchise history is Erik Kristiansen who played 20 seasons scoring 509 goals and 406 assists in 649 games. The best known player internationally from Storhamar is Patrick Thoresen.

During the 2016–17 playoffs, Storhamar Hockey was involved in the longest professional hockey match ever recorded, taking 217 minutes and 14 seconds to defeat Sparta Warriors 2-1. The game ended in the 11th period (8 overtimes) when Joakim Jensen scored for Storhamar.

== Season-by-season results ==
This is a partial list of the last ten seasons completed by Storhamar. For the full season-by-season history, see List of Storhamar Hockey seasons.

| Norwegian Champions | Regular Season Champions | Promoted | Relegated |

| Season | League | Regular season | | | | | | | | | Playoffs |
| Season | League | GP | W | L | OTW | OTL | GF | GA | Pts | Finish | Playoffs |
|---|---|---|---|---|---|---|---|---|---|---|---|
| 2013–14 | Eliteserien | 45 | 22 | 15 | 3 | 5 | 146 | 123 | 62 | 6th | Lost in Semi-finals, 3–4 (Vålerenga) |
| 2014–15 | Eliteserien | 45 | 29 | 10 | 2 | 4 | 200 | 112 | 95 | 2nd | Lost in Finals, 3–4 (Stavanger) |
| 2015–16 | Eliteserien | 45 | 22 | 17 | 2 | 4 | 146 | 111 | 74 | 6th | Lost in Semi-finals, 3–4 (Stavanger) |
| 2016–17 | Eliteserien | 45 | 21 | 14 | 3 | 7 | 131 | 104 | 76 | 3rd | Lost in Quarter-finals, 3–4 (Sparta) |
| 2017–18 | Eliteserien | 45 | 35 | 7 | 0 | 3 | 183 | 88 | 108 | 1st | Won Norwegian Championship, 4–1 (Lillehammer) |
| 2018–19 | Eliteserien | 48 | 28 | 8 | 8 | 4 | 175 | 97 | 104 | 2nd | Lost in Finals, 2–4 (Frisk Asker) |
| 2019–20 | Eliteserien | 45 | 26 | 11 | 4 | 4 | 179 | 111 | 90 | 2nd | Cancelled due to the COVID-19 pandemic |
| 2020–21 | Eliteserien | 24 | 17 | 6 | 1 | 0 | 98 | 57 | 53 | 2nd | Cancelled due to the COVID-19 pandemic |
| 2021–22 | Eliteserien | 43 | 20 | 15 | 4 | 4 | 139 | 127 | 72 | 6th | Lost in Finals, 0–4 (Stavanger) |
| 2022–23 | Eliteserien | 45 | 28 | 10 | 4 | 3 | 191 | 93 | 95 | 2nd | Lost in Finals, 3–4 (Stavanger) |
| 2023–24 | Eliteserien | 45 | 33 | 9 | 0 | 3 | 209 | 76 | 133 | 1st | Won Norwegian Championship, 4–1 (Vålerenga) |
| 2024–25 | Eliteserien | 45 | 34 | 2 | 6 | 3 | 192 | 66 | 114 | 1st | Won Norwegian Championship, 4–0 (Stavanger) |
| 2025–26 | Eliteserien | | | | | | | | | | Won Norwegian Championship, 4–2 (Frisk Asker) |

== Players ==
=== Current roster ===
As of 13 February 2025.

| No. | Nat | Player | Pos | S/G | Age | Acquired | Birthplace |
|---|---|---|---|---|---|---|---|
| 29 | (Norway) | David Aas-Larsen | C | L | 22 | 2024 | Lørenskog, Norway |
| 67 | (Norway) | Mats Bakke Olsen | RW | R | 22 | 2024 | Hamar, Norway |
| 12 | (Sweden) | Jacob Berglund (C) | C | L | 34 | 2022 | Malmö, Sweden |
| 91 | (Norway) | Marcus Bryhnisveen | C | L | 31 | 2023 | Oslo, Norway |
| 86 | (United States) | Austin Cangelosi | C | R | 31 | 2024 | Hillsborough, New Jersey, United States |
| 66 | (Norway) | Andreas Dahl | W | L | 24 | 2021 | Trondheim, Norway |
| 71 | (Norway) | Stefan Espeland | D | L | 37 | 2023 | Oslo, Norway |
| 25 | (Norway) | Henrik Fayen-Vestavik | G | L | 26 | 2024 | Asker, Norway |
| 5 | (Canada) | Joe Gatenby | D | R | 29 | 2024 | Kelowna, British Columbia, Canada |
| 39 | (Norway) | Trym Gran | G | L | 25 | 2022 | Sarpsborg, Norway |
| 88 | (Sweden) | Andreas Hjelm | D | L | 38 | 2022 | Stockholm, Sweden |
| 54 | (Norway) | Sander Hurrød | D | L | 26 | 2023 | Fredrikstad, Norway |
| 98 | (Norway) | Jacob Lundell Noer | C | L | 28 | 2021 | Oslo, Norway |
| 27 | (Norway) | Andreas Martinsen (A) | LW | L | 36 | 2023 | Bærum, Norway |
| 83 | (Norway) | Kenneth Pappalardo | C | L | 25 | 2023 | Lørenskog, Norway |
| 26 | (Norway) | Mathias Papuga | D | L | 22 | 2022 | Hamar, Norway |
| 22 | (Norway) | Martin Rønnild (A) | C | L | 30 | 2015 | Fredrikstad, Norway |
| 77 | (Norway) | Sverre Rønningen | D | L | 25 | 2022 | Lillehammer, Norway |
| 19 | (Norway) | Håvard Salsten | F | L | 26 | 2024 | Hamar, Norway |
| 45 | (Norway) | Axel Sandnes | F | L | 21 | 2023 | Hamar, Norway |
| 47 | (Norway) | Adrian Saxrud-Danielsen | D | L | 33 | 2022 | Hamar, Norway |
| 24 | (United States) | Cole Schneider | W | L | 35 | 2024 | Williamsville, New York, United States |
| 28 | (Norway) | Samuel Solem | LW | L | 27 | 2021 | Lørenskog, Norway |
| 35 | (Norway) | Markus Stensrud | G | L | 22 | 2021 | Hamar, Norway |
| 7 | (Sweden) | Victor Svensson | C | L | 36 | 2024 | Karlskrona, Sweden |

=== Team captains ===
- Michael Smithurst - 2000-03
- Mikael Tjälldèn - 2003-05
- Mads Hansen - 2005-06; 2013-15
- Mattias Livf - 2006-08
- Pål Johnsen - 2008-13
- Christian Larrivée - 2015-17
- Patrick Thoresen - 2017
- Kodie Curran - 2017-18
- Patrick Thoresen - 2018-2024
- Jacob Berglund - 2024-present

=== Retired numbers ===
Retired numbers
| No. | Player | Position | Career | Number retirement |
|---|---|---|---|---|
| 11 | Steinar Johansen | C | 1957-1984 | December 9, 2017 |
| 18 | Pål Johnsen | C | 1992–2003, 2006–2015 | September 5, 2015 |
| 20 | Erik Kristiansen | C | 1977–1987, 1988-1998 | 1998 |
| 37 | Lars Løkken Østli | D | 2005–2019 | 2019 |

== Head coaches ==
- Lasse Beckman
- Lenny Eriksson
- Lennart Åhlberg
- Göran Sjöberg
- Petter Thoresen
- Lars Molin
- Petter Salsten
- Aleksandr Smirnov
- Rune Gulliksen
- Peter Johansson

== Records and statistics ==
Statistics for regular season only.

- – current active player

=== Scoring leaders ===
Points
| Player | Seasons | Pos | GP | G | A | Pts | PPG |
|---|---|---|---|---|---|---|---|
| Pål Johnsen | 1992-2015 | C | 725 | 245 | 501 | 746 | 1.02 |
| Erik Kristiansen | 1977–1998 | C | 481 | 396 | 340 | 736 | 1.53 |
| Tom Erik Olsen | 1990-2006 | RW | 530 | 325 | 301 | 626 | 1.18 |
| Joakim Jensen | 2007–2019 | RW | 502 | 245 | 232 | 477 | 0.95 |
| Eirik Skadsdammen | 1999-2018 | LW | 717 | 226 | 236 | 462 | 0.64 |
| Ole Eskild Dahlstrøm | 1992-2005 | C | 359 | 168 | 269 | 437 | 1.21 |
| Christian Larrivée | 2006- | C | 394 | 146 | 270 | 416 | 1.06 |
| Peter Madach | 1986–1996 | C | 277 | 135 | 211 | 346 | 1.24 |
| Arne Bergseng | 1984-1990 | C | 206 | 157 | 130 | 287 | 1.39 |
| Aleksander Smirnov | 1995-2001; 2003-2006 | D | 335 | 68 | 192 | 260 | 0.77 |
| Øystein Tronrud | 1982-1989 | FW | 224 | 122 | 148 | 260 | 1.16 |

=== Most league matches ===
Matches
| Player | Career | Matches |
|---|---|---|
| Pål Johnsen | 1992-2015 | 725 |
| Eirik Skadsdammen | 1999-2018 | 717 |
| Tom Erik Olsen | 1990-2006 | 530 |
| Joakim Jensen | 2007-2019 | 512 |
| Jonas Nordgren | 1997-2009 | 492 |
| Lars Løkken Østli | 2005-2019 | 484 |
| Lars Erik Hesbråten | 2003-2019 | 483 |
| Erik Kristiansen | 1977-1998 | 481 |
| Jon-Hroar Nordstrøm | 1984-1999 | 426 |
| Børre Østvang | 1981-1994 | 403 |

Last updated: 19 January 2021
Source: silarkivet.no

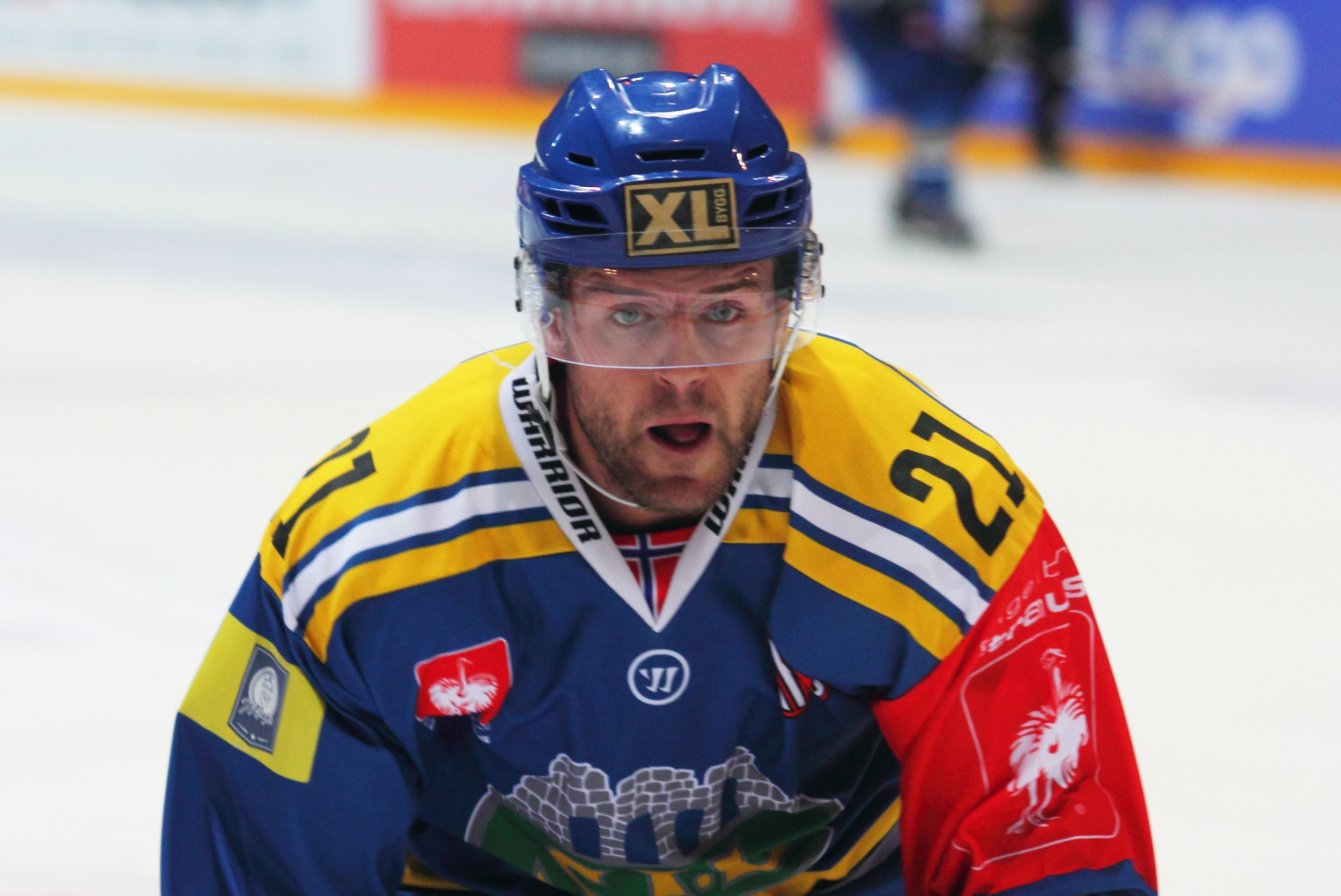
Joakim Jensen has 470 points in 481 games for Storhamar.

=== Team ===
Norwegian Championship

- 1994–95
- 1995–96
- 1996–97
- 1999–00
- 2003-04
- 2007-08
- 2017-18
- 2023-24

=== Individual ===
NIHF Golden Puck winners

- Øyvind Løsamoen - 1983/84
- Erik Kristiansen - 1984/85
- Ole Eskild Dahlstrøm - 1995/96
- Petter Salsten - 1996/97
- Pål Johnsen - 1999/00

GET-ligaen Playoff MVP

- 2006/07, 2014/15 - Christian Larrivée
- 2007/08 - Ruben Smith

All Star team selections

- Åge Ellingsen, 1985, 1986, 1989
- Erik Kristiansen, 1985
- Petter Salsten, 1993, 1995, 1996, 1997, 1998
- Nikolai Davydkin, 1993
- Jim Marthinsen, 1995, 1996
- Martin Åhlberg, 1995
- Ole Eskild Dahlstrøm, 1996, 1997, 2002, 2003
- Tom Erik Olsen, 1996
- Aleksandr Smirnov, 1997
- Mika Rautio, 1998
- Pål Johnsen, 2000
- Antti Rahkonen, 2004
- Jonas Norgren, 2006
- Mads Hansen, 2006
- Patrick Yetman, 2006
- Trevor Koenig, 2011
- Tommy Johansen, 2012

== Previous seasons' rosters ==
- Storhamar Dragons roster 2009/10
