= Lillehammer IK =

Ice hockey club in Lillehammer, Norway

Lillehammer Ishockeyklubb
- City: Lillehammer, Norway
- League: EliteHockey Ligaen
- Founded: 1957; 69 years ago
- Home arena: Eidsiva Arena; Håkons Hall
- Colors: Red, navy and white
- General manager: Atle Svensrud
- Head coach: Jakub Petr
- Captain: Christian Fosse
- Affiliates: Gjøvik (1. div)
- Website: lillehammerhockey.no

Championships
- Regular season titles: 0
- Playoff championships: 1994

Lillehammer Ishockeyklubb is an ice hockey club based in Lillehammer, Norway and playing in the EliteHockey Ligaen (EHL). Home games are played in Eidsiva Arena (Kristins Hall), and occasionally in Håkons Hall.

== History ==
Founded on 2 November 1957, Lillehammer IK was a pioneer of ice hockey in the northern areas of eastern Norway. Playing under difficult conditions on natural ice for the first thirty years, success was limited to the odd foray into the second tier of the hockey league. However, they produced some fine talents, two of them brothers Arne and Lars Bergseng, who went on to become two of the best players in the first division during the 1980s.

The big break for the hockey club was Lillehammer's candidacy for the 1994 Winter Olympics. In this process the Kristins Hall hockey arena was built and opened in 1988. The city got its Olympics, and the hockey club their boost. Backed by enormous local interest they surged from the third division to the Eliteserien in only three years, but the success would not stop there. In the spring of 1994, after the Olympics was over, Lillehammer beat local rivals Storhamar Ishockey in the playoff finals to claim their first, and to date only Norwegian Championship.

Since the heady Olympic days of the early 1990s, Lillehammer IK have struggled keep up the high level people started to expect. Economic problems have on several occasions threatened the club's existence. Today the club is known for a good youth department, helped on by the hockey college NTG, producing players such as current Chicago Blackhawks player Andreas Martinsen, former Columbus Blue Jackets and Philadelphia Flyers forward Ole Kristian Tollefsen, and Per Åge Skrøder, formerly with MODO Hockey of the Swedish Elite League.

After the struggles of the late 1990s and 2000s, Lillehammer IK rose to become one of the better clubs in Norway through their stellar player development during the early 2010s. However after being one game away from the finals in 2014 but then eventually losing in seven games to the eventual champion Stavanger Oilers, the club hit two rough seasons, the latter 2015-16 season ending in relegation play. But in only two seasons the team was able to elevate to their second best season ever during the 2017-18 season, ending up with a bronze medal in the series and their first finals appearance in 24 years in the playoffs.

On the 18 November 2017, the club hosted an event called Hockey Classic, a game between Lillehammer IK and their rival Storhamar in Håkons Hall. This was the first time since 1995 they had played against each other in Håkons Hall, and the game was a success financially and socially, with the attendance setting a new indoor Norwegian hockey record with 10,031 in attendance. On 17 November 2018, a new Hockey Classic took place, with over 9000 spectators experiencing Lillehammer beating Storhamar 3-2 after an impressive homecoming from Alexander Reichenberg.

== Season-by-season results ==
This is a partial list of the last ten seasons completed by Lillehammer. For the full season-by-season history, see List of Lillehammer IK seasons.

Norwegian Champions	Regular Season Champions	Promoted	Relegated

Season	League	Regular season									Playoffs
Season	League	GP	W	L	OTW	OTL	GF	GA	Pts	Finish	Playoffs
2013–14	Eliteserien	45	23	15	3	4	158	135	79	3rd	Lost in Semi-finals, 3–4 (Stavanger)
2014–15	Eliteserien	45	18	21	5	1	140	137	65	7th	Lost in Quarter-finals, 0–4 (Storhamar)
2015–16	Eliteserien	45	9	27	6	3	118	157	42	9th	1st in Qualifying for Eliteserien
2016–17	Eliteserien	45	17	16	9	3	138	131	72	6th	Lost in Semi-finals, 1–4 (Frisk Asker)
2017–18	Eliteserien	45	24	11	6	4	171	123	88	3rd	Lost in Finals, 1–4 (Storhamar)
2018–19	Eliteserien	48	25	14	6	3	185	141	90	4th	Lost in Quarter-finals, 3–4 (Frisk Asker)
2019–20	Eliteserien	45	23	15	0	7	158	131	76	5th	Cancelled due to the COVID-19 pandemic
2020–21	Eliteserien	24	13	7	1	3	83	71	44	5th	Cancelled due to the COVID-19 pandemic
2021–22	Eliteserien	45	18	14	5	8	139	133	72	7th	Lost in Quarter-finals, 3–4 (Stjernen)
2022–23	Eliteserien	45	12	26	4	3	112	168	47	7th	Lost in Quarter-finals, 0–4 (Stavanger)

== Players ==
=== Retired numbers ===
Retired numbers
No.	Player	Position	Career	Number retirement
24	Per Olav Skarpjordet	D/F	1996-2005	December 30, 2009
17	Øystein Tronrud	F	?-1982, 1989-1994	N/A
94	Lars Bergseng	F	?-1981, 1990-1994	N/A
25	Arne Bergseng	F	?-1980s?, 1990-1994	N/A

== Records and statistics ==
- – current active player

=== Most matches ===
Includes regular season and playoffs.

Matches
Player	Career	Matches
Stein Tore Bakken	2004-	712
Joakim Eidsæther	2005-	699
Per Olav Skarpjordet	1996-2005	508
Lars Hammerseng	2001-2012	446
Aleksander Rindal	2007-2016	408
Timo Laituri	1991-2004	406
Mattis Haakensen	1991-2000	402
Tor Erik Nilsen	-1996; 1997-2001	369
Lars Moe	2000-2009	361
Ronny Reichenberg	1993-2001	360

Last updated: 30 May 2018

=== Former notable players ===
- Åge Ellingsen
- Ole Kristian Tollefsen
- Per Åge Skrøder
- Andreas Martinsen
- Tomáš Sršeň
- Martin Špaňhel
- R.J. Anderson
- Gino Guyer
- Brett Cameron
- Lars Erik Spets
- Troy Rutkowski
