= Mats Zuccarello =

Norwegian ice hockey player (born 1987)

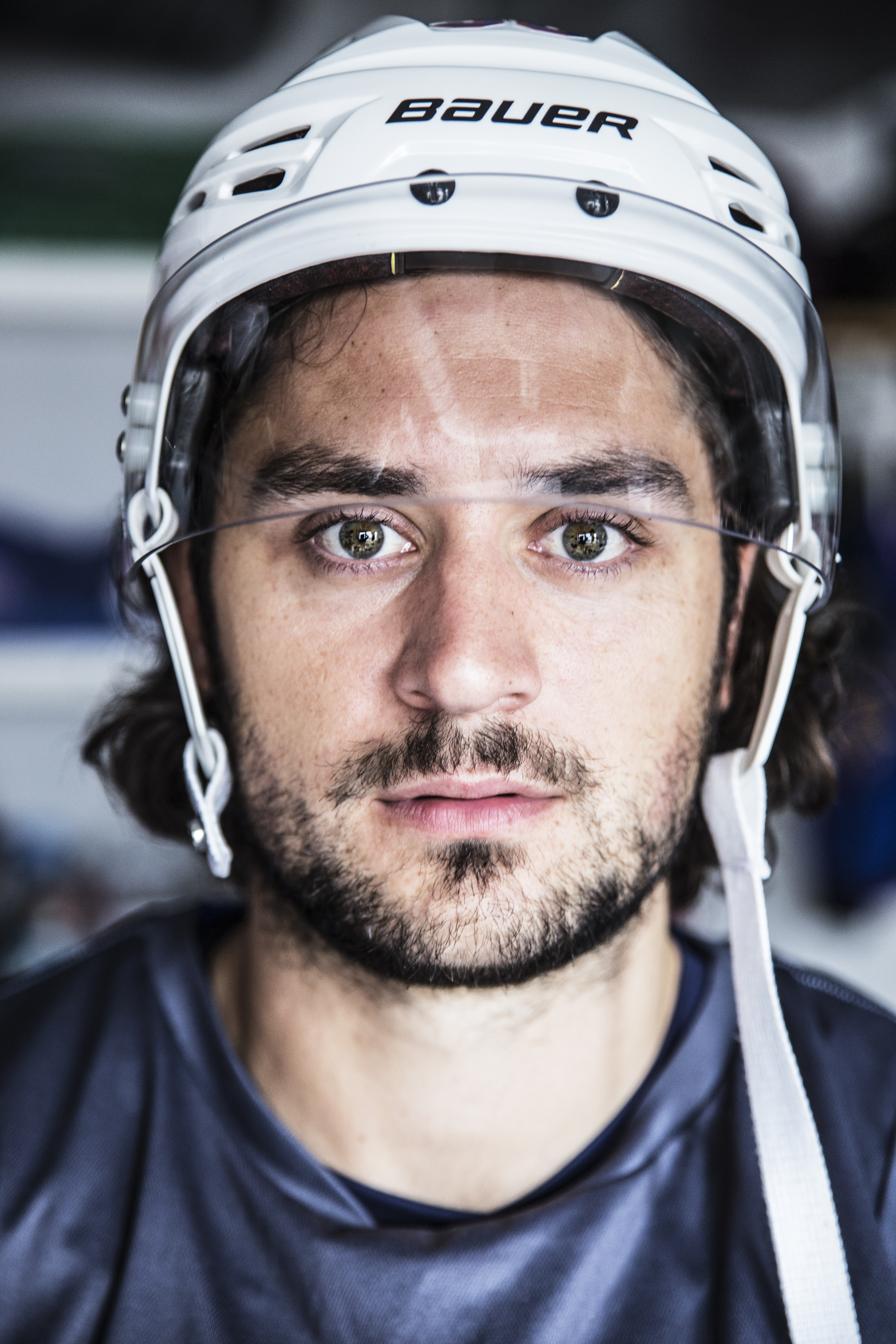
- Zuccarello in 2015
- Born: 1 September 1987 (age 39) Oslo, Norway
- Height: 5 ft 8 in (173 cm)
- Weight: 179 lb (81 kg; 12 st 11 lb)
- Position: Winger
- Shoots: Left
- NHL team Former teams: Los Angeles Kings; Frisk Tigers; Modo Hockey; New York Rangers; Metallurg Magnitogorsk; Dallas Stars; Minnesota Wild
- National team: Norway
- NHL draft: Undrafted
- Playing career: 2004–present

Mats André Zuccarello Aasen (born 1 September 1987) is a Norwegian professional ice hockey player who is a winger for the Los Angeles Kings of the National Hockey League (NHL). He has also played for the New York Rangers, Dallas Stars, and Minnesota Wild. Prior to joining the NHL, Zuccarello previously played for Modo Hockey in the Swedish Elite League. In 2010, he won the Guldhjälmen (Golden Helmet), awarded annually to the most valuable player in the Swedish Hockey League. He is one of nine Norwegian players to have played in the NHL, and some regard him as one of the best Norwegians to have played in the league.

== Early life ==
Zuccarello grew up in the suburbs of Løren in Oslo and began playing hockey at age five. After several years at Hasle-Løren, he began playing for Vålerenga, where he stayed until the end of lower secondary school. By that time, he had been scouted by Frisk Asker, which offered him a scholarship at the Norwegian College of Elite Sport, which he accepted.

Zuccarello is of Italian descent from his mother's side. He has a younger brother, Fabian, who plays in the Norwegian First Division, and a step brother, Robin Dahlstrøm, who played in both Sweden and Norway before retiring in 2021.

== Playing career ==
=== Norway and Sweden ===
Zuccarello began playing full-time for Frisk in the GET-ligaen, Norway's premiere league, as an 18-year-old. He scored 8 points over 21 games as a rookie in 2005–06. The following season, he improved to 59 points over 43 games, third in league scoring behind Jonas Solberg Andersen and Mathis Olimb. In 2007–08, Zuccarello helped Frisk to the best regular season record in the league. Zuccarello finished third in league scoring a second consecutive season with 64 points, as he and Frisk teammates Chris Abbott, Cam Abbott and Marcus Eriksson ranked as the top four GET-ligaen scorers. Zuccarello added 27 points in 15 playoff games as Frisk advanced to the Finals, where they were defeated in six games by the Storhamar Dragons.

After three seasons in the GET-ligaen, Zuccarello signed with Modo Hockey of the Elitserien, Sweden's premier league. In his first season with Modo, he ranked third in team scoring with 40 points in 35 games. The following season, he led the team with 23 goals. With a league-leading 64 points, he was awarded the Guldhjälmen as the league's most valuable player, as voted by Elitserien players.

=== New York Rangers ===
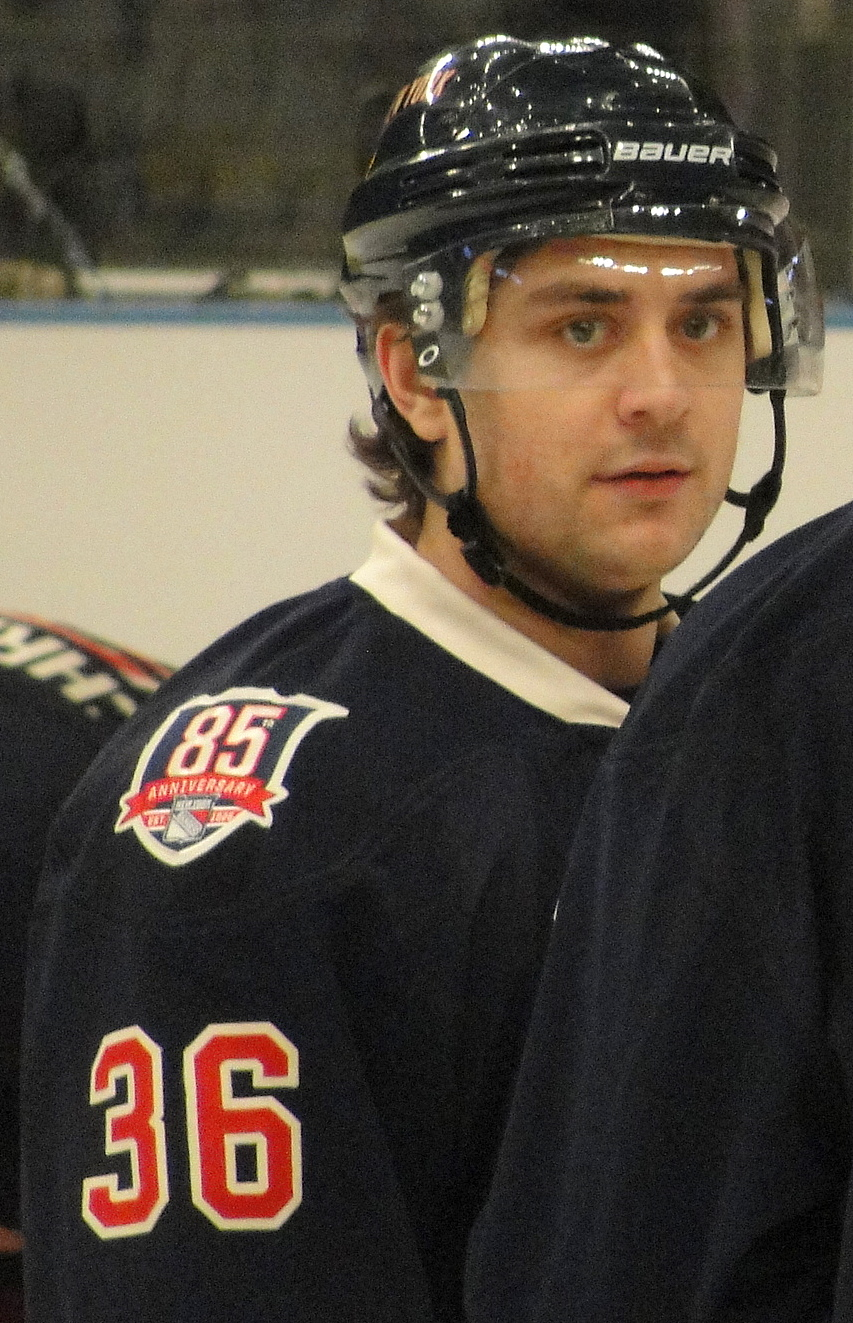
Zuccarello with the Rangers during the 2010–11 NHL season.

In the summer of 2010, Zuccarello was signed as a free agent by the New York Rangers of the National Hockey League (NHL) to a two-year, entry-level contract. He began the 2010–11 season with the Hartford Wolf Pack/Connecticut Whale, the Rangers' American Hockey League (AHL) affiliate, to adapt to the North American style of hockey and rink dimensions. On 22 December 2010, he was called up to the Rangers following an injury to right winger Marián Gáborík. He made his NHL debut on 23 December 2010 against the Tampa Bay Lightning, becoming the seventh Norwegian player to play in the NHL as well as the second undrafted one. Zuccarello logged 17 minutes and 52 seconds of ice time and registered two shots on goal in his NHL debut. As the game remained tied after overtime, Zuccarello scored in the shootout against Lightning goaltender Dan Ellis. However, the Rangers lost the game 4–3. Though he was reassigned to the Whale immediately after the game, the Rangers recalled him for their next game, on 27 December against the New York Islanders. He earned his first NHL assist during the contest, tying defenceman Anders Myrvold for the Norwegian player with the fewest games played before recording an NHL point. The Rangers won the game 7–2. Nine days later, in his sixth game, Zuccarello scored his first NHL goal against goaltender Cam Ward three minutes into overtime, leading the Rangers to a 2–1 victory over the Carolina Hurricanes. On 1 April 2011 he was reassigned to Connecticut after playing 41 games for the Rangers.

On 13 April 2011, Zuccarello became only the second Norwegian to take part in NHL post-season action when the Rangers lost 2–1 against the Washington Capitals.

=== Metallurg Magnitogorsk ===
On 1 June 2012, Zuccarello confirmed he had signed a two-year contract with Metallurg Magnitogorsk of the Kontinental Hockey League (KHL). However, he returned to the NHL and the Rangers after the 2012–13 NHL lockout.

=== Return to New York ===
On 28 March 2013, Zuccarello agreed to terms on a one-year contract with the New York Rangers. Zuccarello played in the last 15 games of the 2012–13 campaign, helping the Rangers reach the postseason. He played in all 12 Ranger playoff games, tallying his first playoff goal in game seven of the Eastern Conference Quarterfinals against the Washington Capitals.

Zuccarello re-signed with the Rangers at the end of the 2012–13 season for another one-year contract, worth $1.15 million. The 2013–14 season turned out to be a breakout season for Zuccarello. He tallied career highs in goals, assists and team-highs in points, as his contributions helped the Rangers reach the 2014 Stanley Cup Final, where they faced-off against the Los Angeles Kings. Although New York lost the series 4–1, Zuccarello made history by becoming the first Norwegian to ever participate in the Stanley Cup Final. His all-around game also took a step forward throughout the season, as he established himself as a hard worker with the ability to get under the skin of his opponents. His work was recognized by being awarded the 2013–14 Steven McDonald Extra Effort Award.

On 22 July 2014, Zuccarello agreed to a one-year, $3.5 million contract with the Rangers.

During the 2014–15 season, Zuccarello agreed to a four-year, $18 million contract worth $4.5 million annually that extends through to the 2018–19 season. He finished fifth on the team in scoring, playing a large role with linemate Rick Nash, having the second-most goals in the NHL, as the Rangers won the Presidents' Trophy with the League's best regular season record. Early into the 2015 Stanley Cup playoffs, Zuccarello was hit in the head by a shot by his own teammate, Rangers captain Ryan McDonagh. It was determined Zuccarello suffered a serious brain contusion and concussion and would most likely miss the rest of the playoffs. But rumors escalated as the Rangers continued their run that he may be available if the Rangers made it to the Stanley Cup Final. However, they lost to the Tampa Bay Lightning in seven games in the 2015 Eastern Conference Finals, ending their season.

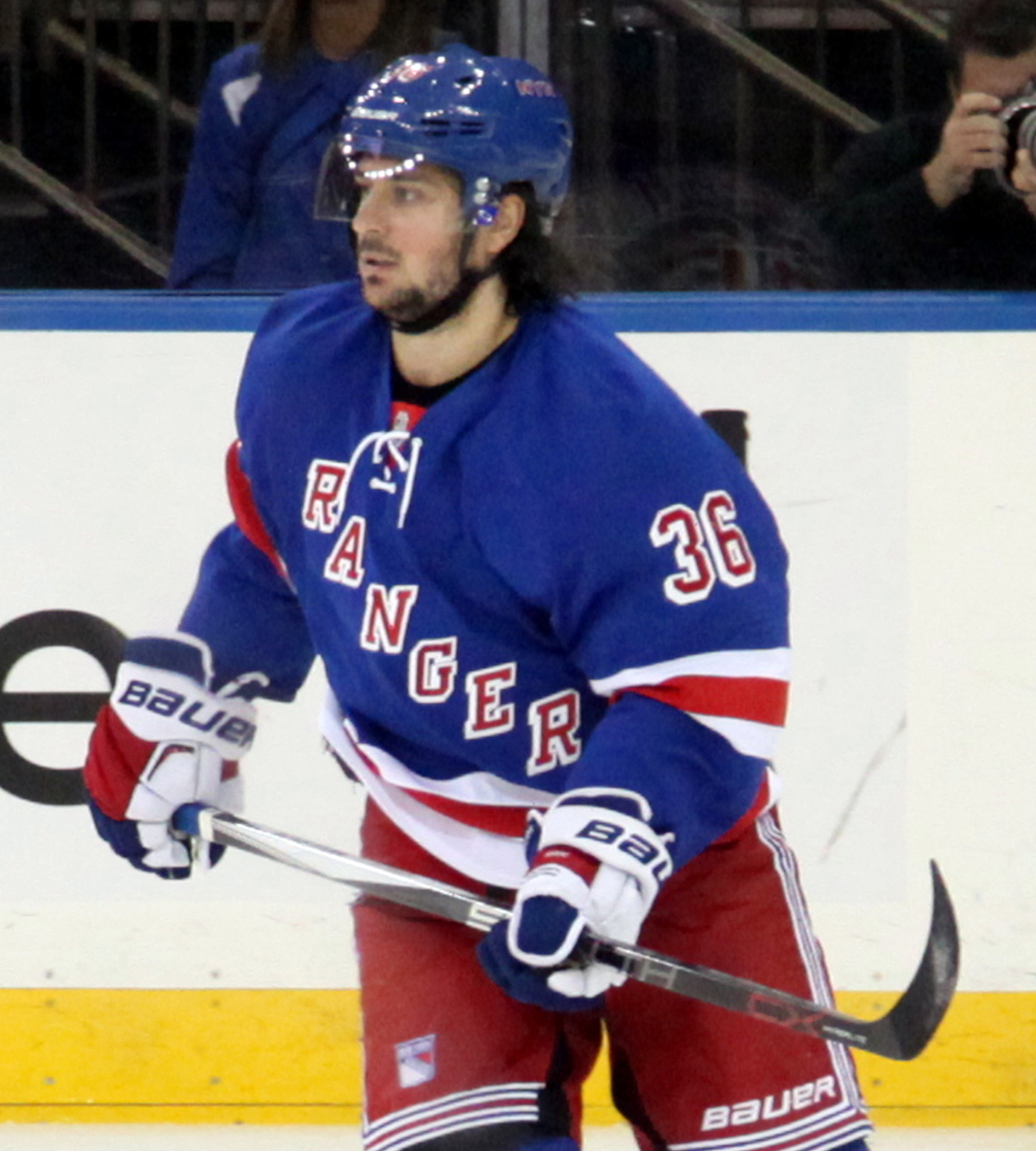
Zuccarello skating with the Rangers in September 2015

At the beginning of the 2015–16 season, Zuccarello got off to a fast start in his return, quickly becoming the team leader in scoring. On 30 October, Zuccarello recorded a hat-trick (the first of his NHL career) against the Toronto Maple Leafs, and on 15 November, he scored the game-winning goal in another game against the Maple Leafs, with less than one minute remaining in regulation. In his comeback season, Zuccarello scored a career-high 26 goals, with 35 assists. His performance, coupled with his tremendous effort, especially returning to the ice after the aforementioned injury the previous postseason, culminated in Zuccarello winning the Steven McDonald Extra Effort Award again and being selected as a finalist for the Bill Masterton Trophy for the 2015–16 season.

To start the 2017–18 season, Zuccarello was named an alternate captain of the Rangers on 4 October 2017. On 12 March 2018, Zuccarello recorded his 100th career NHL goal, in a game against the Carolina Hurricanes, which the Rangers won 6–3. On 23 October 2018, Zuccarello became the ninth player in Rangers history to lead the team in points for three consecutive seasons, joining Jaromír Jágr, Wayne Gretzky, Phil Esposito, Andy Bathgate, Bryan Hextall Sr., Cecil Dillon, Bill Cook and Frank Boucher.

=== Dallas Stars ===
With the Rangers in a rebuild, Zuccarello was traded to the Dallas Stars on 23 February 2019, in exchange for a 2019 conditional second-round pick and a 2020 conditional third-round pick. He debuted with the Stars the same day against the Chicago Blackhawks. He scored his first goal with the team during the second period but later suffered an upper-body injury forcing him to miss the third period of play. Afterwards, the Stars announced he was expected to miss at least four weeks to recover. Zuccarello returned for the playoffs but the Stars were eliminated by the St. Louis Blues in double overtime of game seven in the second round.

=== Minnesota Wild ===
Having left the Stars as a free agent, Zuccarello signed a five-year, $30 million contract with the Minnesota Wild on 1 July 2019.

On 17 April 2022, during a game against the St. Louis Blues, Zuccarello had broken the Wild team record for most assists in a season when he recorded his 51st and 52nd assists, surpassing teammate Kirill Kaprizov and Pierre-Marc Bouchard (2007–08 season), who held the record at 50. He also recorded his 500th career point, making him the 62nd active NHL player to reach that mark since he entered the league in 2010, following Martin St Louis and Artemi Panarin.

On 29 September 2023, Zuccarello signed a two-year, $8.25 million contract extension with the Wild. The extension will keep Zuccarello in Minnesota through the 2025–26 season. During the 2024-25 season Zuccarello was fifth overall on the team for points with 19 goals, 35 assists totaling 54 points in 69 games. It was announced in September 2025 that Zuccarello would miss a minimum of 7-8 weeks of play due to a lower body injury.

=== Los Angeles Kings ===
On 1 July 2026, Zuccarello signed a one-year contract with the Los Angeles Kings.

== International play ==
Zuccarello has represented Norway at the 2008 IIHF World Championship in Canada, the 2009 IIHF World Championship, the 2010 Winter Olympics in Vancouver and the 2010 IIHF World Championship in Germany. He was forced to withdraw from the 2011 IIHF World Championship in Slovakia, however, due to a hand fracture. Zuccarello later represented Norway at the 2014 Winter Olympics in Sochi.

Zuccarello represented Team Europe in the 2016 World Cup of Hockey.

== Career statistics ==
=== Regular season and playoffs ===
			Regular season					Playoffs
Season	Team	League	GP	G	A	Pts	PIM	GP	G	A	Pts	PIM
2003–04	Frisk Tigers	NOR U18	24	23	14	37	44	2	3	1	4	0
2003–04	Frisk Tigers	NOR U19	20	7	14	21	14	3	0	2	2	0
2004–05	Frisk Tigers	NOR U18	12	11	18	29	50	—	—	—	—	—
2004–05	Frisk Tigers	NOR U19	27	19	17	36	16	5	3	3	6	6
2004–05	Frisk Tigers	UPC	1	0	0	0	0	—	—	—	—	—
2005–06	Frisk Tigers	NOR U19	2	7	0	7	0	2	2	3	5	0
2005–06	Frisk Tigers	UPC	21	5	3	8	12	4	0	0	0	2
2006–07	Frisk Tigers	GET	43	34	25	59	36	7	4	4	8	2
2006–07	Frisk Tigers	NOR U19	—	—	—	—	—	1	3	4	7	2
2007–08	Frisk Tigers	GET	33	24	40	64	48	15	12	15	27	24
2008–09	Modo Hockey	SEL	35	12	28	40	38	—	—	—	—	—
2009–10	Modo Hockey	SEL	55	23	41	64	62	—	—	—	—	—
2010–11	New York Rangers	NHL	42	6	17	23	4	1	0	0	0	2
2010–11	Connecticut Whale	AHL	36	13	16	29	16	2	1	1	2	4
2011–12	New York Rangers	NHL	10	2	1	3	6	—	—	—	—	—
2011–12	Connecticut Whale	AHL	37	12	24	36	22	—	—	—	—	—
2012–13	Metallurg Magnitogorsk	KHL	44	11	17	28	30	7	2	2	4	10
2012–13	New York Rangers	NHL	15	3	5	8	8	12	1	6	7	4
2013–14	New York Rangers	NHL	77	19	40	59	32	25	5	8	13	20
2014–15	New York Rangers	NHL	78	15	34	49	45	5	0	2	2	0
2015–16	New York Rangers	NHL	81	26	35	61	34	5	1	1	2	4
2016–17	New York Rangers	NHL	80	15	44	59	26	12	4	3	7	16
2017–18	New York Rangers	NHL	80	16	37	53	36	—	—	—	—	—
2018–19	New York Rangers	NHL	46	11	26	37	24	—	—	—	—	—
2018–19	Dallas Stars	NHL	2	1	2	3	0	13	4	7	11	6
2019–20	Minnesota Wild	NHL	65	15	22	37	18	4	0	1	1	0
2020–21	Minnesota Wild	NHL	42	11	24	35	8	7	0	3	3	2
2021–22	Minnesota Wild	NHL	70	24	55	79	24	6	1	3	4	2
2022–23	Minnesota Wild	NHL	78	22	45	67	26	6	2	3	5	4
2023–24	Minnesota Wild	NHL	69	12	51	63	30	—	—	—	—	—
2024–25	Minnesota Wild	NHL	69	19	35	54	22	6	1	2	3	0
2025–26	Minnesota Wild	NHL	59	15	39	54	20	8	2	7	9	2
2026–27	Los Angeles Kings	NHL	5	0	1	1	2
NHL totals			963	232	512	744	363	110	21	46	67	62
KHL totals			44	11	17	28	30	7	2	2	4	10
SEL totals			90	35	69	104	100	—	—	—	—	—

=== International ===
Year	Team	Event	Result	GP	G	A	Pts	PIM
2004	Norway	U18	10th	6	0	2	2	8
2005	Norway	U18 D1	P	5	2	3	5	6
2006	Norway	WJC	10th	6	0	2	2	4
2007	Norway	WJC D1	DNQ	5	2	5	7	2
2008	Norway	WC	8th	7	1	0	1	2
2009	Norway	OGQ	Q	3	0	0	0	0
2009	Norway	WC	11th	6	3	0	3	8
2010	Norway	OLY	10th	4	1	2	3	2
2010	Norway	WC	9th	6	3	1	4	2
2014	Norway	OLY	12th	3	0	0	0	2
2016	Norway	WC	10th	7	1	2	3	4
2016	Norway	OGQ	Q	3	2	3	5	0
2016	Team Europe	WCH	2nd	6	1	3	4	4
2022	Norway	OGQ	DNQ	3	1	1	2	4
2024	Norway	WC	11th	5	0	6	6	2
2024	Norway	OGQ	DNQ	3	1	4	5	0
Junior totals				22	4	12	16	20
Senior totals				50	14	22	36	30

== Awards and honours ==
Award	Year
NIHF
Gullpucken	2010, 2016, 2017, 2022
SEL
Guldhjälmen (MVP)	2010
AHL
AHL All-Star Game	2012
New York Rangers
Steven McDonald Extra Effort Award	2014, 2016, 2017
