= List of Trondheim Black Panthers seasons =

The Trondheim Black Panthers were a Norwegian ice hockey club based in Trondheim. They were members of the highest Norwegian ice hockey league, Eliteserien, from 1987 until going bankrupt and folding in 2008. The Black Panthers were founded as Trondheim Ishockeyklubb in 1986, after a merger of the ice hockey departments belonging to Astor and Strindheim. Their aim had been to create a team that could reach and compete effectively in the top division. The "Black Panthers" name was adopted in 2000.

Trondheim replaced Astor and Strindheim in the 2. divisjon (second tier) before the 1986–87 season, and immediately won promotion to the 1. divisjon (Eliteserien from 1990 onwards). They went on to complete twenty-one seasons in the Eliteserien, winning over 300 regular season games and two league titles. They were, however, never able to win the Norwegian Championship, despite advancing to the Finals in 1989 and 2005. After struggling for several years, both financially and on the ice, the Black Panthers elected to cease operations in March 2008.

== Seasons ==
| Norwegian Champions | Regular Season Champions | Promoted | Relegated |

| Season | League | Regular season^{[a]} | | | | | | | | | | Postseason^{[a]} | | | | | | | |
| Season | League | GP | W | L | T | OTW | OTL | GF | GA | Pts | Finish | GP | W | L | T | GF | GA | Pts | Result |
|---|---|---|---|---|---|---|---|---|---|---|---|---|---|---|---|---|---|---|---|
| 1986–87 | 2. divisjon | 18 | 15 | 2 | 1 | — | — | 114 | 50 | 31 | 1st | | | | | | | | |
| 1987–88 | 1. divisjon | 36 | 20 | 15 | 1 | — | — | 156 | 122 | 41 | 5th | Did not qualify | | | | | | | |
| 1988–89 | 1. divisjon | 36 | 28 | 7 | 1 | — | — | 198 | 121 | 57 | 1st | 7 | 3 | 4 | — | 24 | 27 | — | Won in semi-finals, 2–1 (Stjernen); Lost in Finals, 1–3 (Sparta) |
| 1989–90 | 1. divisjon | 36 | 15 | 17 | 4 | — | — | 165 | 145 | 34 | 6th | Did not qualify | | | | | | | |
| 1990–91^{[b]} | Eliteserien I | 18 | 10 | 7 | 1 | — | — | 92 | 61 | 21 | 5th | Did not qualify | | | | | | | |
| 1990–91^{[b]} | Eliteserien II^{[c]} | 32 | 17 | 12 | 3 | — | — | 155 | 109 | 37 | 5th | Did not qualify | | | | | | | |
| 1991–92 | Eliteserien I | 18 | 10 | 6 | 2 | — | — | 83 | 71 | 22 | 3rd | 2 | 2 | 0 | 0 | 12 | 7 | 4 | 1st in Quarter-finals |
| 1991–92 | Eliteserien II | 14 | 10 | 3 | 1 | — | — | 68 | 49 | 21 | 1st | 2 | 0 | 2 | — | 2 | 11 | — | Lost in semi-finals, 0–2 (Stjernen) |
| 1992–93 | Eliteserien I | 18 | 4 | 13 | 1 | — | — | 70 | 110 | 9 | 9th | Did not qualify | | | | | | | |
| 1992–93 | 1. divisjon II | 14 | 13 | 1 | 0 | — | — | 114 | 42 | 26 | 1st | Did not qualify | | | | | | | |
| 1993–94 | Eliteserien I | 18 | 9 | 7 | 2 | — | — | 87 | 79 | 20 | 5th | 2 | 0 | 2 | 0 | 4 | 19 | 0 | 3rd in Quarter-finals |
| 1993–94 | Eliteserien II | 14 | 7 | 6 | 1 | — | — | 56 | 57 | 15 | 5th | 2 | 0 | 2 | 0 | 4 | 19 | 0 | 3rd in Quarter-finals |
| 1994–95 | Eliteserien | 28 | 7 | 20 | 1 | — | — | 78 | 138 | 16 | 7th | 6 | 6 | 0 | 0 | 31 | 12 | 12 | 1st in Qualifying for Eliteserien |
| 1995–96 | Eliteserien | 28 | 8 | 18 | 2 | — | — | 87 | 108 | 18 | 6th | 4 | 0 | 4 | 0 | 9 | 20 | 0 | 3rd in Quarter-finals |
| 1996–97 | Eliteserien | 36 | 22 | 12 | 2 | — | — | 143 | 107 | 46 | 3rd | 4 | 1 | 3 | — | 12 | 17 | — | Lost in quarter-finals, 1–3 (Stjernen) |
| 1997–98 | Eliteserien | 44 | 15 | 24 | 4 | — | — | 159 | 181 | 35 | 8th | Did not qualify | | | | | | | |
| 1998–99 | Eliteserien | 44 | 20 | 17 | 7 | — | — | 153 | 136 | 46^{[d]} | 4th | 4 | 1 | 3 | — | 12 | 14 | — | Lost in semi-finals, 1–3 (Storhamar) |
| 1999–2000 | Eliteserien | 38 | 18 | 18 | 2 | — | — | 119 | 134 | 40 | 5th | Did not qualify | | | | | | | |
| 2000–01 | Eliteserien | 42 | 22 | 18 | 2 | — | — | 163 | 148 | 46 | 4th | 3 | 0 | 3 | — | 5 | 21 | — | Lost in semi-finals, 0–3 (Vålerenga) |
| 2001–02 | Eliteserien | 42 | 19 | 20 | 3 | — | — | 136 | 144 | 41 | 5th | 3 | 1 | 2 | — | 7 | 12 | — | Lost in quarter-finals, 1–2 (Lillehammer) |
| 2002–03^{[e]} | Eliteserien | 38 | 15 | 13 | — | 6 | 4 | 135 | 122 | 61 | 4th | 6 | 2 | 4 | — | 17 | 23 | — | Won in quarter-finals, 2–1 (Stjernen); Lost in semi-finals, 0–3 (Vålerenga) |
| 2003–04 | Eliteserien | 42 | 25 | 12 | — | 3 | 2 | 160 | 100 | 83 | 3rd | 4 | 1 | 3 | — | 12 | 14 | — | Lost in quarter-finals, 1–3 (Stavanger) |
| 2004–05 | Eliteserien | 42 | 25 | 12 | — | 3 | 2 | 154 | 101 | 83 | 2nd | 11 | 7 | 4 | — | 30 | 26 | — | Won in quarter-finals, 3–0 (Lillehammer; Won in semi-finals, 3–0 (Storhamar); Lost in Finals, 1–4 (Vålerenga) |
| 2005–06 | Eliteserien | 42 | 10 | 23 | — | 6 | 3 | 114 | 151 | 45 | 9th | 6 | 4 | 0 | — | 0 | 2 | 14 | 1st in Qualifying for Eliteserien |
| 2006–07 | Eliteserien | 44 | 5 | 35 | — | 3 | 1 | 112 | 214 | 22 | 10th | 6 | 4 | 0 | — | 1 | 1 | 15 | 1st in Qualifying for Eliteserien |
| 2007–08 | Eliteserien | 44 | 5 | 34 | — | 3 | 2 | 114 | 211 | 23 | 10th | Did not participate^{[f]} | | | | | | | |
| Eliteserien totals | | 778 | 311 | 362 | 39 | 24 | 12 | 2,865 | 2,858 | 861 | | 52 | 18 | 34 | 0 | 146 | 211 | 4 | 11 playoff appearances |

== Notes ==
- ^{a} Code explanation; GP—Games Played, W—Wins, L—Losses, T—Tied games, OTW—Overtime/Shootout wins, OTL—Overtime/Shootout losses, GF—Goals For, GA—Goals Against, Pts—Points
- ^{b} Before the 1990–91 season, the 1. divisjon was renamed Eliteserien. Correspondingly, the 2. divisjon (second tier) was renamed 1. divisjon, the 3. divisjon (third tier) was renamed 2. divisjon etc.
- ^{c} Between the 1990–91 season and the 1993–94 season, the Eliteserien was divided into two parts. After the first 18 games, the top eight teams qualified for the second half of the Eliteserien. The bottom two teams were relegated to the 1. divisjon and would compete for the right to play in the Eliteserien in the following season. In 1990–91, the results of both rounds were added up to produce one league champion; in the three following seasons, there were two champions per season.
- ^{d} Trondheim and three others clubs were deducted one point during the 1998–99 season.
- ^{e} As of the 2002–03 season, all games in the Eliteserien have a winner. In addition, teams now receive three points for a win in regulation time, two points for a win in overtime and one point for a loss in overtime.
- ^{f} Trondheim relinquished their spot in the qualifying for the 2008–09 Eliteserien because they could no longer meet the financial obligations required for play in the top division.
