= List of Sparta Sarpsborg seasons =

Sparta Sarpsborg is a Norwegian ice hockey club based in Sarpsborg. They are members of the highest Norwegian ice hockey league, Eliteserien (known as GET-ligaen for sponsorship reasons). The Warriors are the ice hockey department of IL Sparta, a sports club founded in 1928. Ice hockey was first included as an activity in 1959, and is now one of two sports practised by the club, the other being football. The club competed as IL Sparta until 1986, at which point a near-bankruptcy highlighted the need to separate the various departments into financially independent units. They were then known as Sparta Hockey until 1995, when the club actually did go bankrupt and were reformed as IHK Sparta Sarpsborg. The turn of the millennium saw the introduction of the "Bears" nickname, which was used until the current "Warriors" came into use ahead of the 2004–05 season. As of 2010, the Warriors have completed thirty-five seasons in the Eliteserien, winning over 570 regular season games and three league titles.

Sparta entered the league system in 1963, starting out in the 3. divisjon (third tier). Promotion to the 1. divisjon (Eliteserien from 1990 onwards) was first won in 1967, but the club were unable to firmly establish themselves in the top division until the 1980–81 season. The 1980s would become Sparta's most successful period, with two Norwegian Championship titles won in 1984 and 1989. Following the bankruptcy in 1995, the Warriors had to start over in the lower tiers, but quickly made their way back to the top. Since 2002, they have made the playoffs every year, and were runners-up for the Norwegian Championship in 2009 after losing 2–4 to Vålerenga.

== Seasons ==
Norwegian Champions	Regular Season Champions	Promoted	Relegated

Season	League	Division	Regular season^{[a]}										Postseason^{[a]}							
Season	League	Division	GP	W	L	T	OTW	OTL	GF	GA	Pts	Finish	GP	W	L	T	GF	GA	Pts	Result
1963–64	3. divisjon	E					—	—												
1964–65	3. divisjon	E	6	5	0	1	—	—	31	12	11	1st	7	3	3	1	30	31	7	3rd in Qualifying for 2. divisjon^{[b]}
1965–66	3. divisjon	E					—	—				1st								
1966–67	2. divisjon	A	10	10	0	0	—	—	54	15	20	1st	2	0	2	0	6	11	0	Lost in Finals, 0–2 (Isbjørnene)
1967–68	1. divisjon		14	3	11	0	—	—	29	85	6	8th								
1968–69	2. divisjon	B	10	8	2	0	—	—	43	17	16	1st	2	0	2	0	4	10	0	Lost in Finals, 0–2 (Grüner)
1969–70	1. divisjon		21	1	20	0	—	—	39	139	2	7th								
1970–71	2. divisjon	A	10	5	3	2	—	—	49	30	12	3rd	Did not qualify							
1971–72	2. divisjon						—	—												
1972–73	2. divisjon	B	10	10	0	0	—	—	75	16	20	1st	10	6	4	0	46	37	12	3rd in Qualifying for 1. divisjon I
1972–73	2. divisjon	B	10	10	0	0	—	—	75	16	20	1st	6	3	1	2	33	16	8	2nd in Qualifying for 1. divisjon II
1973–74	1. divisjon		18	3	12	3	—	—	56	89	9	9th	6	5	1	0	33	12	10	1st in Qualifying for 1. divisjon
1974–75	1. divisjon		18	3	14	1	—	—	49	99	7	9th	6	3	3	0	27	27	6	3rd in Qualifying for 1. divisjon^{[c]}
1975–76	1. divisjon		18	3	14	1	—	—	53	110	7	9th	6	1	5	0	24	48	2	4th in Qualifying for 1. divisjon
1976–77	2. divisjon		18	15	1	2	—	—	159	37	32	1st								
1977–78	1. divisjon		18	10	7	1	—	—	106	95	21	5th	10	2	7	1	30	59	5	6th in Norwegian Championship
1978–79	1. divisjon		18	4	13	1	—	—	63	115	9	9th	7	3	4	0	28	22	6	3rd in Qualifying for 1. divisjon^{[d]}
1979–80	2. divisjon		18	16	1	1	—	—	139	51	33	1st								
1980–81	1. divisjon		36	19	16	1	—	—	174	145	39	5th	Did not qualify							
1981–82	1. divisjon		36	15	15	6	—	—	160	165	36	7th	Did not qualify							
1982–83	1. divisjon		36	23	11	2	—	—	193	121	48	2nd	4	2	2	—	19	14	—	Won in Semi-finals, 2–0 (Djerv); Lost in Finals, 0–2 (Furuset)
1983–84	1. divisjon		28	18	6	4	—	—	138	104	40	1st	6	4	2	—	29	23	—	Won in Semi-finals, 2–1 (Stjernen); Won Norwegian Championship, 2–1 (Vålerengen)
1984–85	1. divisjon		18	12	5	1	—	—	103	65	25	3rd	2	0	2	—	11	16	—	Lost in Semi-finals, 0–2 (Vålerengen)
1984–85	Mellomspillet^{[e]}		10	5	4	1	—	—	51	42	11	3rd	2	0	2	—	11	16	—	Lost in Semi-finals, 0–2 (Vålerengen)
1985–86	1. divisjon		36	26	5	5	—	—	257	134	57	1st	3	1	2	—	10	15	—	Lost in Semi-finals, 1–2 (Frisk)
1986–87	1. divisjon		36	22	12	2	—	—	167	144	46	3rd	2	0	2	—	9	11	—	Lost in Semi-finals, 0–2 (Stjernen)
1987–88	1. divisjon		36	18	18	0	—	—	177	181	36	6th	Did not qualify							
1988–89	1. divisjon		36	21	13	2	—	—	159	135	44	4th	6	5	1	—	32	17	—	Won in Semi-finals, 2–0 (Storhamar); Won Norwegian Championship, 3–1 (Trondheim)
1989–90	1. divisjon		36	25	11	0	—	—	197	144	50	3rd	3	1	2	—	13	18	—	Lost in Semi-finals, 1–2 (Vålerenga)
1990–91^{[f]}	Eliteserien I		18	13	4	1	—	—	137	65	27	2nd	2	0	2	—	4	11	—	Lost in Semi-finals, 0–2 (Vålerenga)
1990–91^{[f]}	Eliteserien II^{[g]}		32	19	11	2	—	—	206	133	41	4th	2	0	2	—	4	11	—	Lost in Semi-finals, 0–2 (Vålerenga)
1991–92	Eliteserien I		18	8	10	0	—	—	87	77	16	7th	2	0	2	0	6	8	0	3rd in Quarter-finals
1991–92	Eliteserien II		14	5	8	1	—	—	69	92	11	6th	2	0	2	0	6	8	0	3rd in Quarter-finals
1992–93	Eliteserien I		18	5	13	0	—	—	82	97	16	7th	Did not qualify							
1992–93	Eliteserien II		14	5	8	1	—	—	52	63	11	7th	Did not qualify							
1993–94	Eliteserien I		18	8	8	2	—	—	86	72	18	6th	2	1	1	0	3	8	2	3rd in Quarter-finals
1993–94	Eliteserien II		14	5	9	0	—	—	49	72	10	6th	2	1	1	0	3	8	2	3rd in Quarter-finals
1994–95	Eliteserien		28	2	24	2	—	—	70	217	6	8th	4	3	1	0	19	16	6	2nd in Qualifying for Eliteserien
Sparta Hockey went bankrupt and were reconstituted as IHK Sparta Sarpsborg
1995–96	2. divisjon		20	15	4	1	—	—	158	66	31	2nd	6	5	0	1	33	13	11	1st in Qualifying for 1. divisjon
1996–97	1. divisjon		20	16	1	3	—	—	131	65	35	1st								
1997–98	Eliteserien		44	23	18	3	—	—	165	152	49	4th	3	0	3	—	5	14	—	Lost in Semi-finals, 0–3 (Vålerenga)
1998–99	Eliteserien		44	20	21	3	—	—	141	138	42^{[h]}	6th	Did not qualify							
1999–2000	Eliteserien		38	20	17	1	—	—	128	117	41	4th	3	0	3	—	4	12	—	Lost in Semi-finals, 0–3 (Storhamar)
2000–01	Eliteserien		42	17	25	0	—	—	118	152	34	7th	Did not qualify							
2001–02	Eliteserien		42	17	21	4	—	—	146	167	38	6th	2	0	2	—	3	11	—	Lost in Quarter-finals, 0–2 (Storhamar Dragons)
2002–03^{[i]}	Eliteserien		38	15	16	—	1	6	118	138	53	6th	2	0	2	—	3	11	—	Lost in Quarter-finals, 0–2 (Frisk)
2003–04	Eliteserien		42	19	18	—	2	3	124	126	64	5th	9	4	5	—	24	34	—	Won in Quarter-finals, 3–2 (Frisk); Lost in Semi-finals, 1–3 (Vålerenga)
2004–05	Eliteserien		42	17	17	—	4	4	125	143	63	6th	4	1	3	—	3	17	—	Lost in Quarter-finals, 1–3 (Storhamar)
2005–06	Eliteserien		42	19	19	—	3	1	140	158	64	5th	6	2	4	—	17	21	—	Lost in Quarter-finals, 2–4 (Stavanger)
2006–07	Eliteserien		44	21	17	—	4	2	182	147	73	5th	13	6	7	—	40	37	—	Won in Quarter-finals, 4–3 (Frisk); Lost in Semi-finals, 2–4 (Vålerenga)
2007–08	Eliteserien		44	26	11	—	3	4	146	109	90	3rd	6	2	4	—	13	20	—	Lost in Quarter-finals, 2–4 (Comet)
2008–09	Eliteserien		45	28	10	—	4	3	172	101	95	1st	15	10	5	—	38	31	—	Won in Quarter-finals, 4–1 (Lørenskog); Won in Semi-finals, 4–0 (Storhamar); Lost in Finals, 2–4 (Vålerenga)
2009–10	Eliteserien		48	26	15	—	1	6	161	122	86	2nd	12	6	6	—	32	29	—	Won in Quarter-finals, 4–2 (Stjernen); Lost in Semi-finals, 2–4 (Stavanger)
Eliteserien totals^{[j]}			1,170	551	519	49	22	29	4,687	4,663	1,403		117	47	69	1	348	437	7	22 playoff appearances

== Notes ==
- ^{a} Code explanation; GP—Games Played, W—Wins, L—Losses, T—Tied games, OTW—Overtime/Shootout wins, OTL—Overtime/Shootout losses, GF—Goals For, GA—Goals Against, Pts—Points
- ^{b} Sparta tied second with Høvik and Holmen after five games. Holmen were disqualified from taking part in the replays. Sparta lost the replay series against Høvik 3–3, 3–6.
- ^{c} Sparta remained in the 1. divisjon despite finishing third in qualifying. Winners Grüner did not participate in the 1. divisjon the following season and their spot passed to Sparta.
- ^{d} Sparta tied second with Forward after six games, lost the replay 3–5 and were thus relegated to the 2. divisjon.
- ^{e} Mellomspillet was a one-time continuation league contested in 1984–85 between the six highest ranked teams in the 1. divisjon. Of these six teams, the top four qualified for the semi-finals of the Norwegian Championship.
- ^{f} Before the 1990–91 season, the 1. divisjon was renamed Eliteserien. Correspondingly, the 2. divisjon (second tier) was renamed 1. divisjon, the 3. divisjon (third tier) was renamed 2. divisjon etc.
- ^{g} Between the 1990–91 season and the 1993–94 season, the Eliteserien was divided into two parts. After the first 18 games, the top eight teams qualified for the second half of the Eliteserien. The bottom two teams were relegated to the 1. divisjon and would compete for the right to play in the Eliteserien in the following season. In 1990–91, the results of both rounds were added up to produce one league champion; in the three following seasons, there were two champions per season.
- ^{h} Sparta and three others clubs were deducted one point during the 1998–99 season.
- ^{i} Beginning with the 2002–03 season, all games in the Eliteserien have a winner. In addition, teams now receive three points for a win in regulation time, two points for a win in overtime and one point for a loss in overtime.
- ^{j} Totals as of the completion of the 2009–10 season.
