= Markku Takala =

Finnish ice hockey centre

- Born: May 2, 1972 (age 52); Vantaa, Finland
- Height: 6 ft 2 in (188 cm)
- Weight: 203 lb (92 kg; 14 st 7 lb)
- Position: Centre
- Shot: Right
- Played for: Kiekko-Espoo; Lukko; Newcastle Cobras; Sparta Warriors; Basingstoke Bison; Furuset Ishockey
- Playing career: 1991–2008

Markku Takala (born May 2, 1972) is a Finnish former professional ice hockey centre.

Takala played in the SM-liiga for Kiekko-Espoo and Lukko. He also played in the British Ice Hockey Superleague for the Newcastle Cobras and the Elite Ice Hockey League for the Basingstoke Bison as well as in Norway for the Sparta Warriors and Furuset Ishockey.

== Career statistics ==
			Regular season					Playoffs
Season	Team	League	GP	G	A	Pts	PIM	GP	G	A	Pts	PIM
1990–91	Jokerit U20	Jr. A SM-sarja	5	4	2	6	22	—	—	—	—	—
1991–92	Jokerit U20	U20 I-Divisioona	1	0	1	1	0	—	—	—	—	—
1991–92	Vantaa HT	I-Divisioona	23	1	6	7	14	—	—	—	—	—
1992–93	Vantaa HT	I-Divisioona	19	6	6	12	10	—	—	—	—	—
1993–94	Kiekko-Espoo	SM-liiga	38	2	8	10	12	—	—	—	—	—
1994–95	Junkkarit HT	I-Divisioona	40	12	24	36	56	—	—	—	—	—
1995–96	Lukko	SM-liiga	3	1	0	1	0	—	—	—	—	—
1995–96	Haukat	I-Divisioona	41	27	28	55	30	—	—	—	—	—
1996–97	Newcastle Cobras	BISL	42	14	7	21	12	6	1	0	1	0
1997–98	Ahmat Hyvinkää	I-Divisioona	13	2	0	2	4	—	—	—	—	—
1997–98	Haukat	I-Divisioona	9	1	5	6	4	—	—	—	—	—
1997–98	Gislaveds SK	Division 2	15	9	14	23	—	—	—	—	—	—
1998–99	Olofströms IK	Division 1	26	12	12	24	26	—	—	—	—	—
1999–00	Brest Albatros Hockey	France2	32	30	32	62	—	—	—	—	—	—
2000–01	Kiekko-Vantaa	Mestis	44	26	32	58	59	3	0	0	0	6
2001–02	Sparta Sarpsborg	Norway	39	17	18	35	26	—	—	—	—	—
2002–03	Sparta Sarpsborg	Norway	32	8	14	22	88	—	—	—	—	—
2003–04	Basingstoke Bison	EIHL	22	2	9	11	14	—	—	—	—	—
2004–05	Sparta Sarpsborg	Norway	41	19	31	50	62	—	—	—	—	—
2005–06	Sparta Sarpsborg	Norway	24	18	16	34	16	—	—	—	—	—
2006–07	Sparta Sarpsborg	Norway	17	1	15	16	10	—	—	—	—	—
2006–07	Kristianstads IK	Division 1	8	5	4	9	2	—	—	—	—	—
2007–08	Furuset Ishockey	Norway	5	0	0	0	0	—	—	—	—	—
SM-liiga totals			41	3	8	11	12	—	—	—	—	—
I-Divisioona totals			145	49	69	118	118	9	6	2	8	20
Norway totals			158	63	94	157	202	—	—	—	—	—
