= Mathis Olimb =

Norwegian ice hockey player

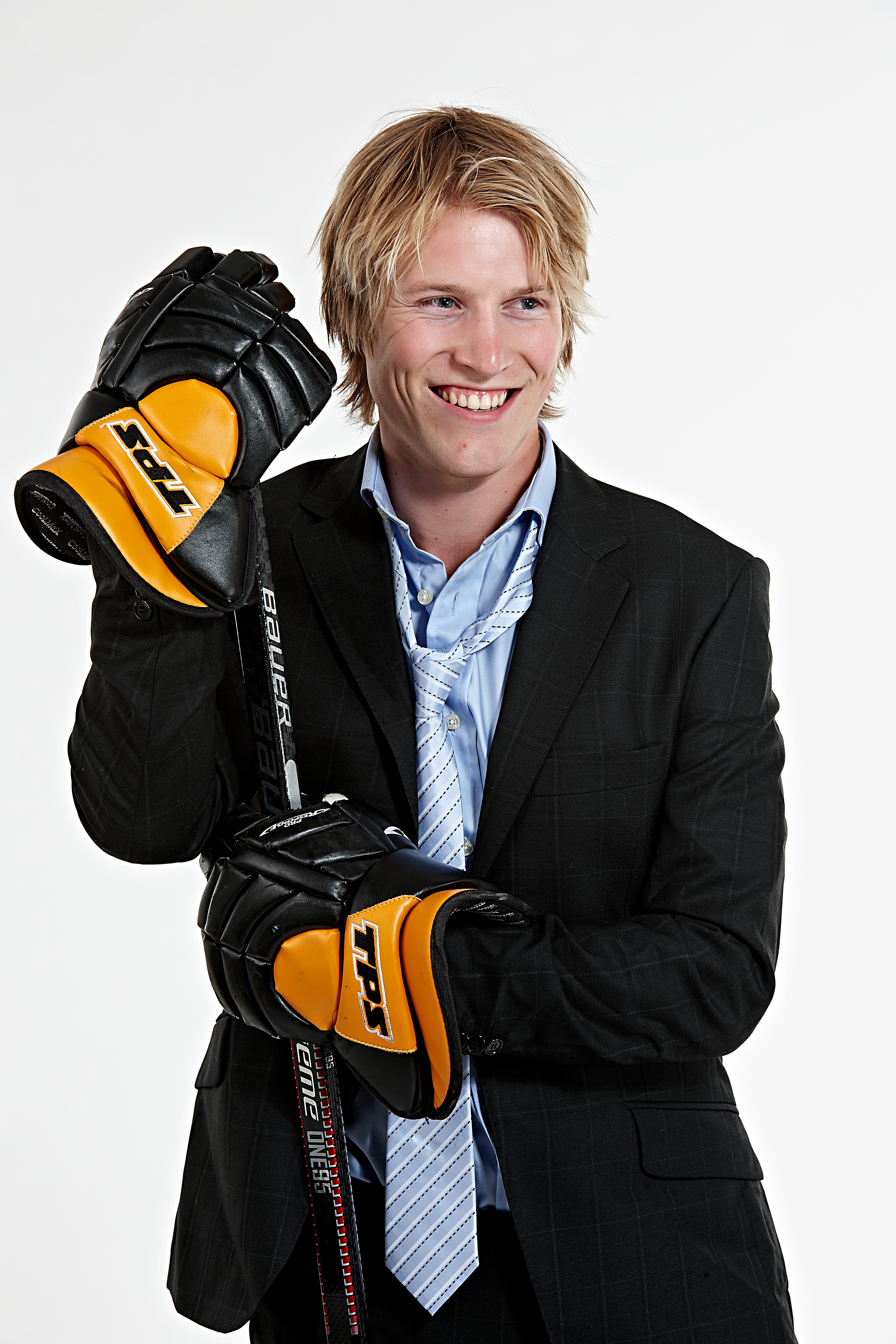
- Born: February 1, 1986 (age 40) Oslo, Norway
- Height: 5 ft 10 in (178 cm)
- Weight: 183 lb (83 kg; 13 st 1 lb)
- Position: Centre
- Shoots: Left
- Norway team Former teams: Vålerenga; Augsburger Panther; Rockford IceHogs; Frölunda HC; Jokerit; Kloten Flyers; Linköpings HC; Skellefteå AIK; Grizzlys Wolfsburg
- National team: Norway
- Playing career: 2002–present

Mathis Olimb (born February 1, 1986) is a Norwegian professional ice hockey forward, currently playing for Vålerenga of the Fjordkraftligaen (Norway). He is the older brother of fellow Norwegian Ken André Olimb.

== Playing career ==
Olimb started his professional career in 2002 in the Norwegian GET-league, playing for Vålerenga, where he grew up. In the 2006–07 season, he finished second among the point leaders and was influential in winning the second straight Norwegian national championship with Vålerenga.

In 2007, he joined Augsburger Panther of the Deutsche Eishockey Liga. After two seasons in Germany, he signed a two-year deal with Frölunda HC of the Swedish Elitserien on June 27, 2009. On June 17, 2010, he was signed by the NHL's Chicago Blackhawks to a one-year deal.

Assigned to the Blackhawks' American Hockey League affiliate, the Rockford IceHogs, for the entire 2010–11 campaign, Olimb returned to Frölunda HC at season's end signing a two-year contract on April 29, 2011. He would play for Frölunda until the end of the 2014-15 campaign. In his last season with Frölunda, Olimb also competed in the Champions Hockey League with the club: In 13 contests, he scored eight goals and tallied 18 assists en route to 2014-15 Champions Hockey League MVP honors.

On April 15, 2015, he signed for Jokerit of the KHL, and moved on to the Kloten Flyers of the Swiss NLA in December 2015. After spending the remainder of the season with the Flyers, Olimb signed a deal with Sweden's Linköpings HC in April 2016, where he would play alongside his brother Ken André.

On May 24, 2019, having played the previous three seasons in Sweden, Olimb left as a free agent and returned to the DEL in signing a two-year contract with German club, Grizzlys Wolfsburg.

== International play ==
Olimb was named to the Norway men's national ice hockey team for competition at the 2014 IIHF World Championship.

== Career statistics ==
=== Regular season and playoffs ===
			Regular season					Playoffs
Season	Team	League	GP	G	A	Pts	PIM	GP	G	A	Pts	PIM
2002–03	Vålerenga	NOR U19	29	15	22	37	16	—	—	—	—	—
2002–03	Vålerenga	NOR	10	5	4	9	4	—	—	—	—	—
2003–04	Vålerenga	NOR U19	2	4	8	12	2	—	—	—	—	—
2003–04	Vålerenga	NOR	3	0	0	0	0	—	—	—	—	—
2003–04	Manglerud Star	NOR U19	2	0	1	1	2	—	—	—	—	—
2003–04	Manglerud Star	NOR	29	5	7	12	16	—	—	—	—	—
2004–05	London Knights	OHL	10	0	2	2	4	—	—	—	—	—
2004–05	Sarnia Sting	OHL	46	8	23	31	12	—	—	—	—	—
2005–06	Vålerenga	NOR	39	11	14	25	46	13	4	3	7	8
2006–07	Vålerenga	NOR	42	19	44	63	59	15	3	7	10	4
2007–08	Augsburger Panther	DEL	54	14	25	39	71	—	—	—	—	—
2008–09	Augsburger Panther	DEL	43	13	28	41	14	—	—	—	—	—
2009–10	Frölunda HC	SEL	55	9	25	34	20	7	1	3	4	4
2010–11	Rockford IceHogs	AHL	59	10	22	32	22	—	—	—	—	—
2011–12	Frölunda HC	SEL	55	10	31	41	34	6	1	3	4	10
2012–13	Frölunda HC	SEL	30	6	7	13	6	6	1	0	1	6
2013–14	Frölunda HC	SHL	52	11	28	39	28	7	1	1	2	2
2014–15	Frölunda HC	SHL	51	7	39	46	65	13	1	5	6	33
2015–16	Jokerit	KHL	38	7	11	18	20	—	—	—	—	—
2015–16	EHC Kloten	NLA	16	2	11	13	0	2	0	0	0	0
2016–17	Linköping HC	SHL	40	8	13	21	35	6	0	1	1	2
2017–18	Linköping HC	SHL	50	12	22	34	32	7	1	4	5	4
2018–19	Skellefteå AIK	SHL	52	4	20	24	30	6	1	2	3	2
2019–20	Grizzlys Wolfsburg	DEL	50	10	26	36	42	—	—	—	—	—
2020–21	Grizzlys Wolfsburg	DEL	34	2	19	21	18	9	1	7	8	6
2021–22	Vålerenga	NOR	40	12	29	41	22	6	2	5	7	2
2022–23	Vålerenga	NOR	43	7	27	34	30	10	1	10	11	8
NOR totals			204	59	124	183	177	50	14	29	43	24
DEL totals			181	39	98	137	145	9	1	7	8	6
SHL totals			385	67	185	252	250	58	7	19	26	63

=== International ===
Year	Team	Event	GP	G	A	Pts	PIM
2002	Norway	WJC18	8	3	4	7	0
2003	Norway	WJC D1	5	0	1	1	0
2003	Norway	WJC18 D1	5	3	2	5	4
2004	Norway	WJC D1	5	2	4	6	0
2004	Norway	WJC18 D1	6	0	6	6	14
2005	Norway	WJC D1	5	4	5	9	18
2006	Norway	WJC	6	2	1	3	8
2007	Norway	WC	6	0	3	3	8
2008	Norway	WC	7	2	0	2	4
2009	Norway	OGQ	2	0	0	0	0
2010	Norway	OG	4	0	2	2	0
2010	Norway	WC	6	1	3	4	0
2011	Norway	WC	7	1	8	9	4
2012	Norway	WC	8	1	6	7	16
2013	Norway	WC	7	0	4	4	0
2014	Norway	OG	4	0	2	2	4
2014	Norway	WC	7	1	7	8	12
2015	Norway	WC	7	0	8	8	4
2016	Norway	WC	7	2	4	6	6
2016	Norway	OGQ	3	1	1	2	2
2017	Norway	WC	7	1	4	5	10
2018	Norway	OG	5	0	1	1	2
2018	Norway	WC	7	1	3	4	24
2019	Norway	WC	7	0	4	4	6
2021	Norway	WC	7	2	1	3	2
2021	Norway	OGQ	3	1	1	2	0
2022	Norway	WC	7	2	0	2	2
Junior totals			40	14	23	37	44
Senior totals			118	16	62	78	106
