= Takala (surname) =

Takala is a Finnish surname. Notable people with the surname include:

- Aino Takala (1882 – 1972; née Seppäläinen), Finnish typographer and politician
- Akseli Takala (1897 – 1951), Finnish athlete
- Irina Takala (born 1955), Russian historian
- Markku Takala (born 1972), Finnish former professional ice hockey
- Juho Takala (1902–1982), Finnish schoolteacher and politician
- Pilvi Takala (born 1981), Finnish performance artist presenting candid camera as art
- Tuomas Takala (born 1984), Finnish ice hockey player
- Tuuli Takala (born 1987), Finnish classical singer and operatic soprano

== Other ==
- Eufenio Takala, king of Sigave
