= Ken André Olimb =

Norwegian ice hockey player (born 1989)

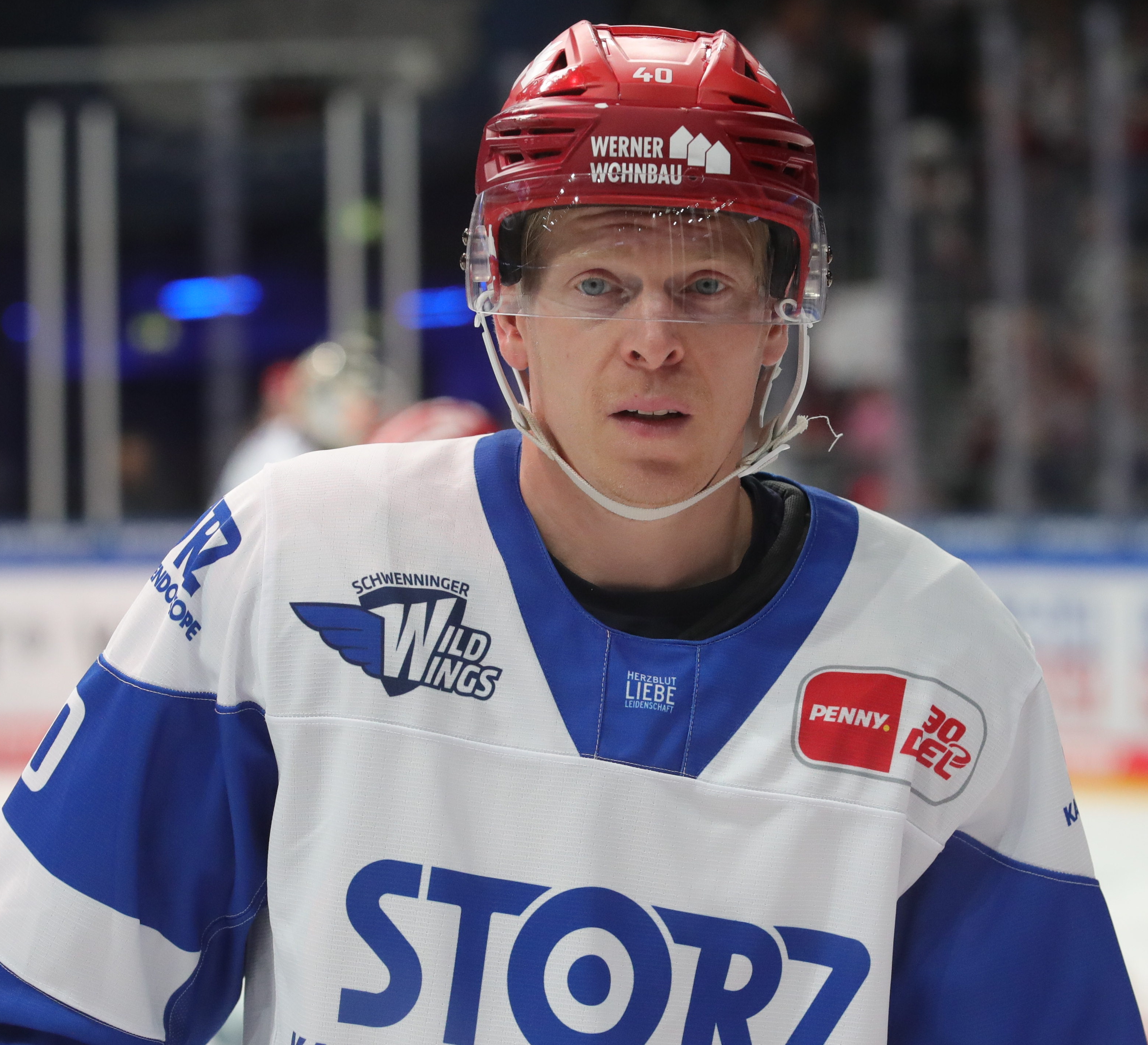
- Ken André Olimb, 2023
- Born: January 21, 1989 (age 37) Oslo, Norway
- Height: 5 ft 10 in (178 cm)
- Weight: 179 lb (81 kg; 12 st 11 lb)
- Position: Left wing
- Shoots: Left
- EHL team Former teams: Vålerenga; Frisk Asker; Düsseldorfer EG; Linköpings HC; Schwenninger Wild Wings
- National team: Norway
- Playing career: 2006–present

Ken André Olimb (born January 21, 1989) is a Norwegian professional ice hockey player, who is currently playing for Vålerenga Ishockey of the EliteHockey Ligaen (EHL). He is the younger brother of fellow Norwegian international Mathis Olimb.

== Playing career ==
Born and raised in Norway's capital city Oslo, Olimb came through the youth ranks of Manglerud Star. He made his debut in Norway's top-tier during the 2006–07 campaign, playing for Vålerenga. In 2008, he headed to Frisk Asker and after a two-year stint, he took his game abroad, signing with Leksands IF of the Swedish second division Allsvenskan, where he would spend two years. After another year (2012–13) in the Allsvenskan with BIK Karlskoga, he moved to Germany. Olimb spent three years with Düsseldorfer EG of the country's top-tier Deutsche Eishockey Liga (DEL), tallying 44 goals and 87 assists in 159 DEL contests.

In April 2016, he was signed by Linköping HC of the Swedish Hockey League (SHL), where he would play alongside his brother Mathis for the next two seasons.

On April 10, 2018, Olimb as a free agent opted to return for a second stint with Düsseldorfer EG of the DEL, agreeing to a three-year contract through 2021.

On 27 May 2021, Olimb left DEG at the conclusion of his contract, signing a one-year contract to continue in the DEL with the Schwenninger Wild Wings.

== International play ==
Olimb participated at the 2010 IIHF World Championship as a member of the Norway men's national ice hockey team. On January 7, 2014, Olimb was named to Team Norway's official 2014 Winter Olympics roster.

He was named to the Norway men's national ice hockey team for competition at the 2014 IIHF World Championship.

== Career statistics ==
=== Regular season and playoffs ===
			Regular season					Playoffs
Season	Team	League	GP	G	A	Pts	PIM	GP	G	A	Pts	PIM
2006–07	Vålerenga Ishockey II	NOR.2	3	0	2	2	6	—	—	—	—	—
2006–07	Vålerenga Ishockey	NOR	34	10	15	25	14	15	1	1	2	4
2007–08	Vålerenga Ishockey II	NOR.2	12	6	15	21	18	—	—	—	—	—
2007–08	Vålerenga Ishockey	NOR	38	6	5	11	8	10	0	2	2	0
2008–09	Frisk Asker	NOR	45	10	26	36	14	5	4	0	4	25
2009–10	Frisk Asker	NOR	48	17	30	47	10	—	—	—	—	—
2010–11	Leksands IF	J20	1	0	0	0	0	—	—	—	—	—
2010–11	Leksands IF	Allsv	41	11	17	28	14	6	0	1	1	0
2011–12	Leksands IF	Allsv	51	9	16	25	30	10	2	4	6	4
2012–13	BIK Karlskoga	Allsv	51	16	26	42	16	6	1	2	3	4
2013–14	Düsseldorfer EG	DEL	39	9	17	26	26	—	—	—	—	—
2014–15	Düsseldorfer EG	DEL	51	13	39	52	18	12	2	6	8	2
2015–16	Düsseldorfer EG	DEL	52	19	23	42	16	5	1	2	3	4
2016–17	Linköping HC	SHL	39	9	13	22	4	6	1	0	1	0
2017–18	Linköping HC	SHL	48	8	20	28	8	7	2	5	7	2
2018–19	Düsseldorfer EG	DEL	50	13	18	31	18	7	0	1	1	2
2019–20	Düsseldorfer EG	DEL	51	11	23	34	12	—	—	—	—	—
2020–21	Düsseldorfer EG	DEL	38	4	18	22	14	—	—	—	—	—
2021–22	Schwenninger Wild Wings	DEL	50	9	23	32	6	—	—	—	—	—
2022–23	Schwenninger Wild Wings	DEL	56	4	17	21	18	—	—	—	—	—
2023–24	Schwenninger Wild Wings	DEL	48	2	7	9	4	6	0	0	0	0
NOR totals			165	43	76	119	46	33	6	10	16	29
DEL totals			435	84	185	269	132	30	3	9	12	8

=== International ===
Year	Team	Event	GP	G	A	Pts	PIM
2006	Norway	WJC18 D1	6	1	0	1	4
2007	Norway	WJC D1	5	1	3	4	4
2007	Norway	WJC18 D1	5	2	3	5	16
2008	Norway	WJC D1	5	2	5	7	2
2009	Norway	WJC D1	5	2	3	5	0
2010	Norway	WC	6	0	0	0	0
2011	Norway	WC	7	3	1	4	0
2012	Norway	WC	8	0	2	2	0
2013	Norway	WC	7	1	3	4	4
2014	Norway	OG	4	0	0	0	2
2014	Norway	WC	7	1	4	5	0
2015	Norway	WC	7	1	1	2	0
2016	Norway	WC	7	3	2	5	4
2016	Norway	OGQ	3	0	2	2	2
2017	Norway	WC	7	2	3	5	0
2018	Norway	OG	5	0	2	2	2
2018	Norway	WC	7	2	1	3	2
2021	Norway	WC	6	2	3	5	2
2021	Norway	OGQ	3	2	3	5	0
2022	Norway	WC	6	0	5	5	4
2023	Norway	WC	7	0	1	1	0
2024	Norway	OGQ	3	2	2	4	0
Junior totals			26	8	14	22	26
Senior totals			100	19	35	54	22
