= Duane Harmer =

Canadian ice hockey player

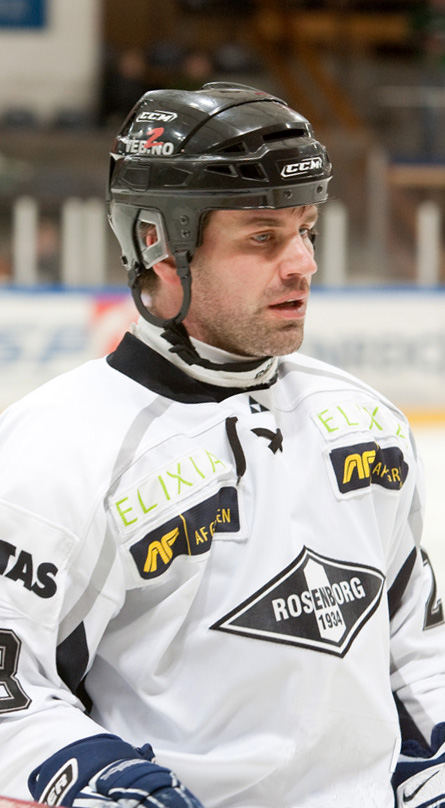
- Born: June 3, 1974 (age 51) Fullarton, Ontario, Canada
- Height: 6 ft 0 in (183 cm)
- Weight: 190 lb (86 kg; 13 st 8 lb)
- Position: Defence
- Shot: Right
- Played for: Rosenborg IHK(1DIV); Tappara(SM-liiga); Södertälje (SEL); Skellefteå (SEL); Trondheim Black Panthers (GET); Roanoke Express (ECHL); Providence Bruins (AHL); Lowell Lock Monsters (AHL)
- NHL draft: Undrafted
- Playing career: 1995–2010

Duane Harmer (born June 3, 1974) is a Canadian retired professional ice hockey defenceman.

== Juniors ==
Born in Fullarton, Ontario, Harmer grew up playing his minor hockey for Mitchell Minor Hockey teams in the WOAA before spending a year with the St. Marys Lincolns Jr.B. club of the OHA. He was also a competitive fastball player for several clubs in the western Ontario area over the years.

After playing the 1990–91 season with the Lincolns, Harmer was selected in the 15th round (229th overall) by the OHL's Guelph Storm in May 1991.

Harmer began his career in the Ontario Hockey League, playing for the Guelph Storm and the Detroit Jr. Red Wings. As a member of the junior Red Wings, Harmer often was paired with future NHL All-Star Bryan Berard

== Professional ==
He turned pro in 1995 and spent four seasons with the Roanoke Express in the East Coast Hockey League with his best season coming in 1997–98 where he scored 10 goals and 40 assists for 50 points, leading the team in assists. He moved to the American Hockey League but had uneventful spells with the Lowell Lock Monsters and the Providence Bruins and would spend the next three years moving between AHL and ECHL teams. Harmer played in the ECHL All-Star Game during the 1998-99 ECHL season and was voted to the ECHL's 2nd All-Star Team in 1999-2000

In 2003, Harmer moved to Europe and joined the Trondheim Black Panthers in Norway. After two seasons with Trondheim, he moved to Germany to play for EC Bad Tölz in the 2. Eishockey-Bundesliga. He then went back to Norway and returned to Trondheim before moving to Sweden's Elitserien for Skellefteå AIK and now plays for Södertälje SK.

On 18 October 2008, he signed with Tappara Tampere of the SM-liiga, where he scored six points in 42 games. Harmer returned to Norway to play for Rosenborg IHK, who had played in Norway's 1st Division during the 2009–10 season and officially signed a contract with the team on January 25, 2010. Harmer also scored 8 pts in 6 games during the postseason.

On March 12, 2010, Harmer announced his retirement.

== Career statistics ==
			Regular season					Playoffs
Season	Team	League	GP	G	A	Pts	PIM	GP	G	A	Pts	PIM
1991–92	Guelph Storm	OHL	55	2	7	9	72	—	—	—	—	—
1992–93	Guelph Storm	OHL	62	4	25	29	67	5	0	0	0	0
1993–94	Guelph Storm	OHL	41	7	16	23	29	—	—	—	—	—
1993–94	Plymouth Whalers	OHL	20	1	6	7	16	17	1	7	8	21
1994–95	Plymouth Whalers	OHL	64	10	33	43	104	21	4	9	13	12
1995–96	Roanoke Express	ECHL	69	5	13	18	120	3	0	0	0	4
1996–97	Roanoke Express	ECHL	70	4	28	32	122	4	0	4	4	2
1997–98	Roanoke Express	ECHL	66	10	40	50	94	9	1	2	3	16
1998–99	Roanoke Express	ECHL	41	6	18	24	56	12	2	5	7	0
1998–99	Lowell Lock Monsters	AHL	14	0	2	2	16	—	—	—	—	—
1998–99	Providence Bruins	AHL	9	0	4	4	4	—	—	—	—	—
1999–00	Roanoke Express	ECHL	47	10	37	47	59	4	1	1	2	24
1999–00	Portland Pirates	AHL	7	1	3	4	2	—	—	—	—	—
1999–00	Providence Bruins	AHL	16	1	3	4	10	10	1	4	5	4
2000–01	Greensboro Generals	ECHL	39	3	21	24	64	—	—	—	—	—
2000–01	Lowell Lock Monsters	AHL	14	1	1	2	10	—	—	—	—	—
2000–01	Providence Bruins	AHL	6	1	4	5	2	—	—	—	—	—
2000–01	Hershey Bears	AHL	15	2	2	4	14	1	0	0	0	0
2001–02	Florida Everblades	ECHL	44	8	16	24	34	6	0	0	0	2
2001–02	Lowell Lock Monsters	AHL	23	1	5	6	15	—	—	—	—	—
2002–03	Florida Everblades	ECHL	39	6	13	19	40	1	0	0	0	0
2003–04	Trondheim Black Panthers	Norway	42	16	16	32	74	4	3	0	3	4
2004–05	Trondheim Black Panthers	Norway	42	10	16	26	42	11	1	4	5	8
2005–06	Tölzer Löwen	Germany2	42	4	22	26	46	—	—	—	—	—
2006–07	Trondheim Black Panthers	Norway	36	11	24	35	63	—	—	—	—	—
2006–07	Skellefteå AIK	SHL	11	1	6	7	10	10	1	7	8	4
2007–08	Södertälje SK	SHL	55	5	17	22	38	—	—	—	—	—
2008–09	Tappara	Liiga	42	1	5	6	30	—	—	—	—	—
2009–10	Rosenborg IHK	Norway2	8	2	3	5	4	—	—	—	—	—
AHL totals			104	7	24	31	73	11	1	4	5	4
ECHL totals			415	52	186	238	589	39	4	12	16	48
