= Tomáš Sršeň =

- Born: 25 August 1966 (age 59) Olomouc, Czechoslovakia
- Height: 5 ft 11 in (180 cm)
- Weight: 195 lb (88 kg; 13 st 13 lb)
- Position: Left wing
- Shot: Left
- Played for: Frederikshavn White Hawks; Lillehammer IK; HC Merano; HC Vítkovice; Essen Mosquitoes; HC Dadák Vsetín; Rögle BK; Leksands IF; Edmonton Oilers; TJ Zetor Brno
- National team: Czech Republic
- NHL draft: 147th overall, 1987; Edmonton Oilers
- Playing career: 1984–2011

Tomáš Sršeň (born 25 August 1966) is a Czech former professional ice hockey left wing who played two games in the National Hockey League for the Edmonton Oilers during the 1990–91 season. The rest of his career, which lasted from 1984 to 2011, was mainly spent in the Czech Republic. Internationally Sršeň played for the Czech national team at several international tournaments, including the 1994 Winter Olympics.

== Career ==
Sršeň started his career with TJ Zetor Brno in 1985 and played for his home country in the 1986 World Junior Ice Hockey Championships. He was selected in the seventh round of the 1987 NHL entry draft by the Edmonton Oilers, but stayed in Czechoslovakia for three more seasons, playing for Zetor and for HC Dukla Jihlava

Sršeň made his National Hockey League debut for the Oilers in the 1990–91 season, but only appeared in two games for the club, registering no scoring points. He spent most of the season, and all of the next, with the minor league affiliate Cape Breton Oilers.

Sršeň returned to Europe for the 1992–93 season, playing with Leksands IF and then Rögle BK in the Swedish Elitserien. For Rögle, he won the Håkan Loob Trophy as the league's top scorer with 28 goals in the 1993–94 season. He was a member of the Czech Republic national team at the 1994 Winter Olympics and at the 1994 and 1995 World Championships. He returned to his home country during the 1994–95 season and played for HC Vsetín until 1999. During these years, his team won five consecutive championships of the Czech Extraliga.

In 1999, Sršeň joined the Essen Mosquitoes of the Deutsche Eishockey Liga but lasted just one season before returning to the Czech Republic where he split the 1999-00 season with HC Havířov and HC Vítkovice. He then had spells in the Italian Serie A for HC Merano and in the 2nd Bundesliga in Germany for EHC Wolfsburg. Between 2002 and 2006, Sršeň divided his time between HC Havířov and Lillehammer IK in Norway, as well as a short stint with HC Olomouc. He then spent a season in Denmark with the Frederikshavn White Hawks and then played four seasons with HC Uničov of the Czech 2. Liga before retiring in 2011.

== Career statistics ==
=== Regular season and playoffs ===
			Regular season					Playoffs
Season	Team	League	GP	G	A	Pts	PIM	GP	G	A	Pts	PIM
1984–85	TJ DS Olomouc	CSSR-2	31	14	8	22	20	—	—	—	—	—
1985–86	TJ Zetor Brno	CSSR	40	6	5	11	44	—	—	—	—	—
1986–87	TJ Zetor Brno	CSSR	40	15	8	23	44	—	—	—	—	—
1987–88	TJ Zetor Brno	CSSR	45	24	8	32	72	—	—	—	—	—
1988–89	ASD Dukla Jihlava	CSSR	30	11	9	20	48	12	8	2	10	—
1989–90	TJ Zetor Brno	CSSR	5	3	5	8	4	—	—	—	—	—
1990–91	Edmonton Oilers	NHL	2	0	0	0	0	—	—	—	—	—
1990–91	Cape Breton Oilers	AHL	72	32	26	58	100	4	3	1	4	6
1991–92	Cape Breton Oilers	AHL	68	19	27	46	79	5	2	2	4	2
1992–93	Leksands IF	SEL	39	20	6	26	48	2	2	1	3	4
1993–94	Rögle BK	SEL	40	28	13	41	72	3	0	0	0	8
1994–95	Rögle BK	SEL	16	3	1	4	28	—	—	—	—	—
1994–95	HC Dadák Vsetín	CZE	24	9	18	27	76	11	6	3	9	16
1995–96	HC Dadák Vsetín	CZE	33	7	20	27	79	12	4	9	13	8
1996–97	HC Petra Vsetín	CZE	51	16	37	53	80	10	7	10	17	38
1997–98	HC Petra Vsetín	CZE	49	13	23	36	100	10	5	3	8	20
1998–99	HC Slovnaft Vsetín	CZE	47	8	28	36	81	10	3	2	5	39
1999–00	Essen Mosquitoes	DEL	55	16	13	29	86	—	—	—	—	—
2000–01	HC Femax Havířov	CZE	39	11	13	24	38	—	—	—	—	—
2000–01	HC Vítkovice	CZE	7	1	1	2	4	10	1	1	2	6
2001–02	HC Merano	ITA	17	7	8	15	12	—	—	—	—	—
2001–02	EHC Wolfsburg	GER-2	29	14	20	34	56	5	3	5	8	14
2002–03	HC Havířov Panthers	CZE	52	9	21	30	108	—	—	—	—	—
2003–04	Lillehammer IK	NOR	26	13	21	34	103	—	—	—	—	—
2003–04	HC Havířov Panthers	CZE-2	4	0	0	0	6	—	—	—	—	—
2003–04	HC Olomouc	CZE-2	9	1	3	4	12	—	—	—	—	—
2004–05	Lillehammer IK	NOR	41	20	27	47	102	3	0	2	2	26
2005–06	Lillehammer IK	NOR	42	20	35	55	120	5	1	6	7	67
2006–07	Frederikshavn White Hawks	DNK	34	8	18	26	156	5	0	4	4	10
2007–08	HC Uničov	CZE-3	25	8	9	17	85	—	—	—	—	—
2008–09	HC Uničov	CZE-3	22	4	11	15	73	5	0	1	1	32
2009–10	HC Uničov	CZE-3	35	14	10	24	99	—	—	—	—	—
2010–11	HC Uničov	CZE-3	5	0	1	1	14	—	—	—	—	—
NHL totals			2	0	0	0	0	—	—	—	—	—
CSSE/CZE totals			462	133	186	319	778	75	34	30	64	127

=== International ===
Year	Team	Event	GP	G	A	Pts	PIM
1986	Czechoslovakia	WJC	7	0	2	2	6
1994	Czech Republic	OLY	8	2	3	5	8
1994	Czech Republic	WC	6	1	1	2	2
1995	Czech Republic	WC	8	1	1	2	6
Junior totals			7	0	2	2	6
Senior totals			22	4	5	9	16
