= Yetman (surname) =

Yetman is an English-language surname that may refer to:

- David Yetman (born 1941), American academic and social scientist
- Hubbard R. Yetman (1847–1924), American real estate agent and politician
- Patrick Yetman (born 1980), Canadian professional ice hockey player
- Rex Yetman (1933–2009), Canadian bluegrass musician
- Wayne Yetman (born 1946), Canadian long-distance runner and Olympian
