= Patrick Yetman =

Canadian ice hockey player

- Born: November 17, 1980 (age 45) St. John's, Newfoundland, Canada
- Height: 5 ft 10 in (178 cm)
- Weight: 172 lb (78 kg; 12 st 4 lb)
- Position: Right wing
- Shot: Right
- Played for: Springfield Falcons; Hartford Wolf Pack; Storhamar Ishockey; Manitoba Moose; Pelicans; Modo Hockey; Södertälje SK; Ässät; Linköpings HC
- Playing career: 2001–2013

Patrick Yetman (born November 17, 1980) is a Canadian former professional ice hockey player.

== Playing career ==
Born in St. John's, Newfoundland, Patrick played junior level hockey for Cape Breton Screaming Eagles of the QMJHL in 1998–99, transferring to Moncton Wildcats for the 1999–2000 and 2000–01 seasons. He was not drafted by the NHL, and turned professional with the Augusta Lynx of the ECHL at the end of the 2000–01 season, playing some games with Kansas City Blades as well. He played the full 2000–01 ECHL season with Augusta, but played some games with Springfield Falcons of the AHL, and a playoff game with the Hartford Wolf Pack. The next season was mixed between Hartford, Augusta and Dayton Bombers.

In 2003, Patrick moved to Europe to play two seasons with ESV Kaufbeuren. Before the 2005–06 season he signed with the Storhamar Dragons and became an immediate hit. He scored 46 goals in 50 regular season and playoff games in the Norwegian GET-ligaen. He was also named the player of the month by the website Eurohockey.net for January 2006. In 2006, he returned to North America and played four games with the Manitoba Moose before returning to Europe to play with Pelicans of the Finnish SM-Liga. In 2007–08, Patrick joined Modo Hockey in Sweden. Due to Swedish tax rules he was loaned out to the Storhamar Dragons where he played 11 games and scored 16 points before joining Modo. He returned to Storhamar again the following season on a similar deal but was limited to only eight games due to injuries before he re-joined Modo.

== Career statistics ==
			Regular season					Playoffs
Season	Team	League	GP	G	A	Pts	PIM	GP	G	A	Pts	PIM
1998–99	Charlottetown Abbies	MJAHL	26	27	39	66	36	15	11	13	24	6
1998–99	Cape Breton Screaming Eagles	QMJHL	26	5	9	14	21	—	—	—	—	—
1999–00	Moncton Wildcats	QMJHL	65	18	34	52	53	16	7	9	16	27
2000–01	Moncton Wildcats	QMJHL	71	33	68	101	32	—	—	—	—	—
2000–01	Augusta Lynx	ECHL	1	0	1	1	0	—	—	—	—	—
2000–01	Kansas City Blades	IHL	3	2	1	3	0	—	—	—	—	—
2001–02	Augusta Lynx	ECHL	61	25	23	48	18	—	—	—	—	—
2001–02	Springfield Falcons	AHL	9	3	1	4	4	—	—	—	—	—
2001–02	Hartford Wolf Pack	AHL	—	—	—	—	—	1	0	0	0	0
2002–03	Hartford Wolf Pack	AHL	28	5	6	11	6	—	—	—	—	—
2002–03	Augusta Lynx	ECHL	39	11	14	25	26	—	—	—	—	—
2002–03	Dayton Bombers	ECHL	4	0	2	2	0	—	—	—	—	—
2003–04	ESV Kaufbeuren	Germany2	43	18	36	54	26	—	—	—	—	—
2004–05	ESV Kaufbeuren	Germany2	50	15	35	50	24	—	—	—	—	—
2005–06	Storhamar Ishockey	Norway	42	42	27	69	16	8	4	3	7	4
2006–07	Manitoba Moose	AHL	4	0	1	1	0	—	—	—	—	—
2006–07	Lahti Pelicans	SM-liiga	35	15	10	25	8	6	1	1	2	14
2007–08	Storhamar Ishockey	Norway	11	5	11	16	18	—	—	—	—	—
2007–08	Modo Hockey	Elitserien	35	11	19	30	24	4	1	3	4	0
2008–09	Storhamar Ishockey	Norway	8	6	0	6	0	—	—	—	—	—
2008–09	Modo Hockey	Elitserien	36	10	15	25	10	—	—	—	—	—
2009–10	VIK Västerås HK	HockeyAllsvenskan	8	3	6	9	6	—	—	—	—	—
2009–10	Södertälje SK	Elitserien	23	5	13	18	4	—	—	—	—	—
2010–11	Ässät	SM-liiga	56	12	11	23	51	5	1	0	1	2
2011–12	Ässät	SM-liiga	36	6	6	12	18	—	—	—	—	—
2011–12	Linköping HC	Elitserien	13	3	2	5	6	—	—	—	—	—
2012–13	Örebro HK	HockeyAllsvenskan	26	10	15	25	14	—	—	—	—	—
2018–19	Grand Falls-Windsor Cataracts	NSHL-Sr.	11	5	8	13	2	6	3	7	10	0
AHL totals			41	8	8	16	10	1	0	0	0	0
ECHL totals			105	36	40	76	44	—	—	—	—	—
