= Ilya Dubkov =

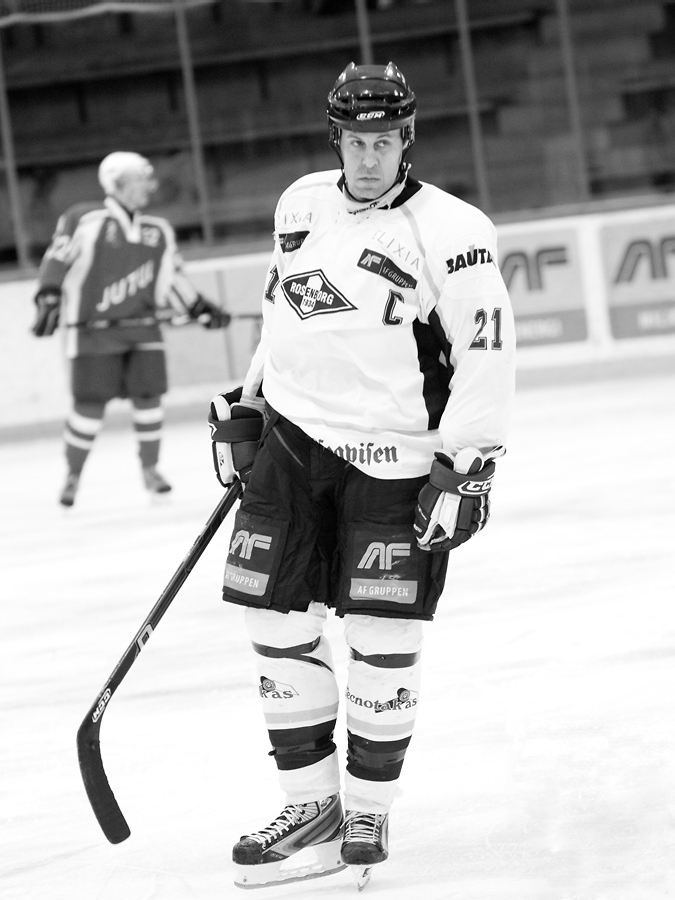
- Born: February 17, 1972 (age 53); Moscow, USSR
- Height: 6 ft 2 in (188 cm)
- Weight: 189 lb (86 kg; 13 st 7 lb)
- Position: Centre
- Shot: Left
- Played for: HC CSKA Moscow; Hamilton Bulldogs; Frederikshavn White Hawks; Ritten Sport; Krylia Sovetov Moscow; Trondheim IK; AaB Ishockey; Rosenborg IHK
- Playing career: 1992–2016

Ilya Dubkov (born February 17, 1972) is a Russian former professional ice hockey center forward who spent most of his career playing in Scandinavian leagues.

== Playing career ==
Ilya Dubkov
Medal record

Ice hockey

1. divisjon
Gold medal – first place	2009-2010 Rosenborg IK	

Eliteserien
Silver medal – second place	2004-2005 Trondheim IK	
Bronze medal – third place	2003-2004 Trondheim IK	

Danish League
Gold medal – first place	1999-2000 Frederikshavn IK	

After a year with the Russian team CSKA Moscow, 21-year-old Ilya Dubkov left Russia and moved to Roanoke, Virginia. In Virginia Dubkov played four seasons with Roanoke Express in the ECHL, before getting three appearances with AHL team Hamilton Bulldogs from Hamilton, Ontario, Canada.

After his debut in the AHL, Dubkov - now 25 - was ready to return to Europe. In the 1997-98 season Dubkov was to play for the Danish team Frederikshavn White Hawks, and spent most of the next 13 years in Scandinavia. He stayed with the team until 2002, except for one season in Italy and Russia 2000-2001. The highlight of Dubkov's career in Frederikshavn White Hawks was becoming Danish champion with his team in 2000.

After spending the 2002-03 season in Russia with Krylia Sovetov, it was once again time for Dubkov to return to Scandinavian ice hockey. This time it was time for the center to try something new, and Trondheim Black Panthers from Trondheim, Norway became his team for the next four seasons. Here, he experienced success with Trondheim Black Panthers, winning the bronze medal in 2004 and losing the playoff finals the year after. When the team folded in 2008, Dubkov returned to Denmark for another three years. In addition to two more years with Frederikshavn IK he also spent one season with AaB Ishockey in Aalborg.

Meanwhile, another Trondheim team was about to climb to the elite division (Get-ligaen) of Norwegian ice hockey, and at 37 Dubkov returned to Trondheim in 2009 - a town in which he had become a popular player during his four former years there. This time it was time to help Rosenborg Ishockeyklubb - the "baby brother" of the better known football team Rosenborg BK - and after a strong 4-0 win away against Oslo team Grüner on March 14, 2010 the goal of being promoted to Get-ligaen was reached.

== Career statistics ==
			Regular season						Playoffs/Qualifications
Season	Team	League	GP	G	A	Pts	+/−	PIM	GP	G	A	Pts	+/−	PIM
1992–93	CSKA Moscow	IHL	3	0	0	0		4
1993–94	Roanoke Express	ECHL	68	25	39	64	+3	88	2	0	0	0	-3	15
1994–95	Roanoke Express	ECHL	68	28	47	75	+29	78	8	5	3	8	-3	4
1995–96	Roanoke Express	ECHL	69	20	52	72	-4	99	3	1	0	1	+1	2
1996–97	Roanoke Express	ECHL	53	25	50	75	+23	44	4	0	3	3	-4	6
1996–97	Hamilton Bulldogs	AHL	3	0	1	1	-3	2
1997–98	Frederikshavn White Hawks	ABL	43	35	34	69		128
1998–99	Frederikshavn White Hawks	ABL	47	50	42	92		72
1999–00	Frederikshavn White Hawks	ABL	51	45	45	90		96
2000–01	Sportverein Ritten-Renon	Serie A	38	28	26	54		55	3	2	1	3		2
2000–01	CSKA Moscow	RML	8	1	1	2	-5	8
2001–02	Frederikshavn White Hawks	ABL	48	32	23	55		78
2002–03	Krylia Sovetov 2	RHFL	1	1	0	1		0
2002–03	Krylia Sovetov	RSL	14	0	0	0	-3	8
2002–03	Trondheim Black Panthers	GET	14	8	11	19	+14	8
2003–04	Trondheim Black Panthers	GET	42	32	21	53	+29	70	4	2	2	4	+2	4
2004–05	Trondheim Black Panthers	GET	42	27	42	69	+31	52	11	6	7	13	+3	6
2005–06	Trondheim Black Panthers	GET	42	20	27	47	-8	48	6	2	6	8	+3	10
2006–07	AaB Ishockey	ABL	36	21	20	41		89	17	5	10	15		26
2007–08	Frederikshavn White Hawks	ABL	44	9	30	39		84	18	7	11	18		109
2008–09	Frederikshavn White Hawks	ABL	44	20	29	49		107
2009–10	Rosenborg Ishockeyklubb	NOR2	34	33	61	94		93	6	5	4	9		22
2010–11	Rosenborg Ishockeyklubb	GET	45	11	32	43	-10	66	4	0	1	1	-1	6
2011–12	Rosenborg Ishockeyklubb	GET	45	18	28	46	-9	96	4	0	0	0	-9	6
2012–13	Rosenborg Ishockeyklubb	GET	44	13	26	39	-11	58	6	1	4	5	0	28
2013–14	Rosenborg Ishockeyklubb	GET	25	3	16	19	-8	48
Career totals			958	501	699	1200	+10	1597	97	37	49	81	-27	256
