= Cam Abbott =

Canadian ice hockey player (born 1983)

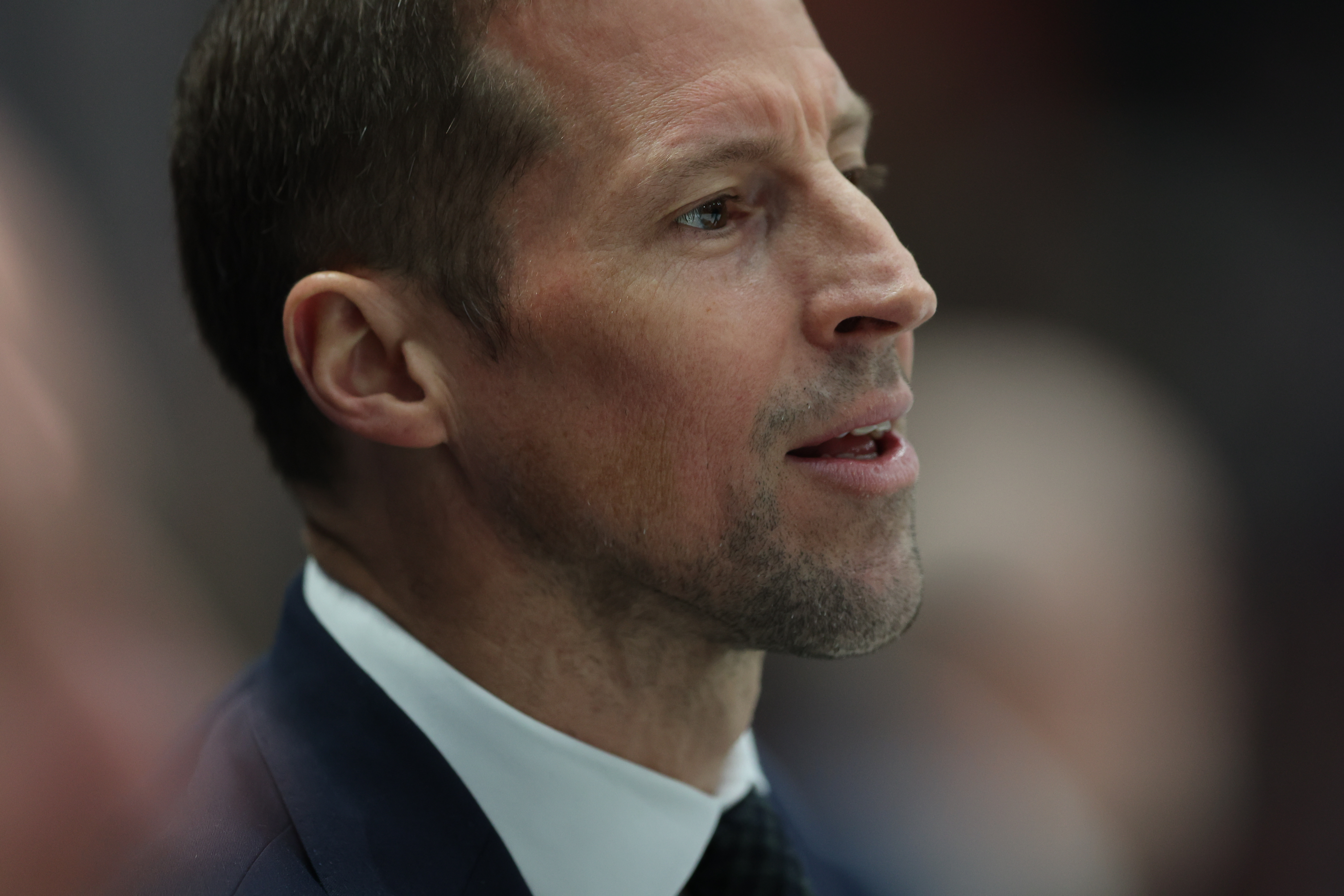
- Born: October 24, 1983 (age 42) Sarnia, Ontario, Canada
- Height: 5 ft 11 in (180 cm)
- Weight: 196 lb (89 kg; 14 st 0 lb)
- Position: Left wing
- Shot: Left
- Played for: Frisk Asker; Rögle BK; Luleå HF
- Playing career: 2006–2015

Cameron Abbott (born October 24, 1983) is a Canadian former professional ice hockey player, best known for his time with Luleå HF in the Swedish Hockey League (SHL). He was the head coach of the AHL's Chicago Wolves from June 2024 until his dismissal in December 2025.

== Playing career ==
Hailing from Sarnia, Ontario, Abbott played college hockey with Cornell University in the ECAC from 2002 to 2006. He began his professional career in 2006 with the Bossier-Shreveport Mudbugs of the Central Hockey League. For the 2007–08 season, he moved overseas to join IF Frisk Asker Tigers in Norway's GET-ligaen. The following year, in 2008, he signed with Rögle BK of the Swedish Elitserien. After a strong campaign with Rögle, Abbott and his brother Chris both agreed to a two-year deal with Luleå HF.

Abbott spent a significant portion of his playing career alongside his twin brother, Chris, as the two shared the ice on several teams both in North America and Europe. After five successful seasons with Luleå HF, Abbott faced a turning point when Chris departed the club to sign with HV71. Rather than continue without his brother, Abbott decided to step away from the game, announcing his retirement from professional hockey on August 2, 2015.

== Coaching career ==
Abbott served as the head coach of Rögle BK from 2017 to 2023. His tenure reached a historic milestone in the 2021–22 season when he guided Rögle to capture their first-ever Champions Hockey League championship. Following his successful run in Sweden, Abbott returned to North America, and on June 20, 2024, he was announced as the new head coach of the American Hockey League's Chicago Wolves. With this appointment, he became the 14th head coach in the history of the franchise, which has been a fixture in the AHL since its founding in 1994. He was dismissed in December 2025.

== Career statistics ==
			Regular season					Playoffs
Season	Team	League	GP	G	A	Pts	PIM	GP	G	A	Pts	PIM
2000–01	Sarnia Steeplejack-Bees	GOHL	52	26	18	44	67	—	—	—	—	—
2001–02	Sarnia Blast	WOHL	53	32	39	71	87	—	—	—	—	—
2002–03	Cornell University	ECAC	35	7	10	17	14	—	—	—	—	—
2003–04	Cornell University	ECAC	30	9	7	16	30	—	—	—	—	—
2004–05	Cornell University	ECAC	25	3	10	13	20	—	—	—	—	—
2005–06	Cornell University	ECAC	35	4	12	16	45	—	—	—	—	—
2006–07	Stockton Thunder	ECHL	2	0	0	0	4	—	—	—	—	—
2006–07	Long Beach Ice Dogs	ECHL	1	0	0	0	4	—	—	—	—	—
2006–07	Bossier-Shreveport Mudbugs	CHL	44	30	30	60	62	11	5	5	10	40
2007–08	Frisk Asker	EHL	42	35	30	65	158	15	14	8	22	63
2008–09	Rögle BK	Elitserien	42	18	21	39	76	10	5	7	12	16
2009–10	Luleå HF	Elitserien	48	16	19	35	108	–	–	–	–	–
2010–11	Luleå HF	Elitserien	32	10	9	19	6	11	2	2	4	12
2011–12	Luleå HF	Elitserien	–	–	–	–	–	–	–	–	–	–
2012–13	Luleå HF	Elitserien	52	5	12	17	44	15	2	6	8	12
2014–15	Luleå HF	SHL	52	14	14	28	40	6	0	0	0	2
2015–16	Luleå HF	SHL	50	11	17	28	42	3	0	1	1	4
ECHL Totals			3	0	0	0	8	—	—	—	—	—
CHL Totals			44	30	30	60	62	11	5	5	10	40
EHL Totals			42	35	30	65	158	15	14	8	22	63
SHL (Elitserien) Totals			276	74	92	166	316	45	9	16	25	46
