= Juho Takala =

Finnish politician (1902–1982)

Juho Takala (6 February 1902, in Ylihärmä – 18 June 1982) was a Finnish schoolteacher and politician. He was a member of the Parliament of Finland from 1933 to 1939 and again from 1940 to 1945, representing the Agrarian League. He was later active in the People's Party of Finland.
