= Chris Abbott (ice hockey) =

Canadian ice hockey player (born 1983)

- Born: October 24, 1983 (age 41); Sarnia, Ontario, Canada
- Height: 5 ft 9 in (175 cm)
- Weight: 192 lb (87 kg; 13 st 10 lb)
- Position: Centre
- Shot: Right
- Played for: Frisk Asker; Rögle BK; Luleå HF; HV71
- Playing career: 2006–2017

Chris Abbott (born October 24, 1983) is a Canadian former ice hockey player, who last played with HV71 of the SHL. He has also been general manager for the club.

His twin brother Cam Abbott, who was also a professional hockey player, is the current head coach for Chicago Wolves, and they played together on several teams.

== Playing career ==
Born in Sarnia, Ontario, Abbott played collegiate hockey for Cornell University of the ECAC from 2002 until 2006. He turned professional in 2006-07 season, initially in the ECHL with the Stockton Thunder and Las Vegas Wranglers before establishing a role with the Bossier-Shreveport Mudbugs of the Central Hockey League.

In the 2007–08 season, he moved to pursue a European career and signed to play for the Frisk Asker Tigers of the Norwegian GET-ligaen. After one season he opted to switch to the Swedish league, signing with the Rögle BK of the Elitserien. After a great season in RBK, Chris, together with his brother Cameron, signed a two-year contract with rivals Luleå HF.

Abbott played with Luleå HF for six seasons, leading the club as captain in his last three before leaving as a free agent to sign a two-year contract with his third SHL club, HV71 on April 21, 2015.

In the 2016–17 season, Abbott was selected as team captain in the final year of his contract with HV71. He contributed with 6 points in 28 games and 6 points in 7 post-season games to help lead HV71 to their 5th Le Mat trophy. A week after claiming the Championship, Abbott was not tendered a new contract with HV71 and became a free agent.

On July 12, 2017, Abbott officially announced his retirement through injury.

== Awards and honors ==
Award	Year
SHL
Le Mat Trophy (HV71)	2017
