= Marcus Eriksson (ice hockey) =

Swedish ice hockey player

- Born: April 26, 1976 (age 49) Vastervik, Sweden
- Height: 5 ft 9 in (175 cm)
- Weight: 185 lb (84 kg; 13 st 3 lb)
- Position: Left wing
- Shot: Right
- Played for: EIHL; Belfast Giants
- NHL draft: Undrafted
- Playing career: 1993–2010

Marcus Eriksson (born April 26, 1976) is a Swedish former professional ice hockey player.

Eriksson played six seasons in the Swedish Elite League with Leksands IF and Mora IK.

== Personal information ==
His older brother Niklas Eriksson won a gold medal in ice hockey at the 1994 Winter Olympics with Team Sweden.
