= 2007–08 GET-ligaen season =

- League: GET-ligaen
- Sport: Ice hockey
- Number of teams: 10
- Regular-season winner: Frisk Tigers
- Champions: Storhamar Dragons

GET-ligaen seasons
- ← 2006–07 season 2008–09 season →

The 2007–08 GET-ligaen season began on 13 September 2007 and was scheduled to end 21 February 2008. The Storhamar Dragons won the championships for the sixth time. The win also marked the fourth championship in as many leap years for the Dragons (1996, 2000, 2004, 2008).

== Regular season ==
=== Final standings ===
#	GET-ligaen	GP	W	L	T	OTW	OTL	GF	GA	PTS
1	Frisk Tigers (C)	44	29	9	6	0	6	205	142	93
2	Vålerenga	44	25	9	10	5	5	156	119	90
3	Sparta Warriors	44	27	11	6	3	3	146	109	90
4	Storhamar Dragons	44	25	15	4	2	2	161	117	81
5	Comet	44	18	12	14	9	5	148	125	77
6	Stavanger Oilers	44	20	16	8	4	4	135	117	72
7	Lillehammer	44	18	22	4	1	3	120	126	59
8	Furuset	44	10	26	8	5	3	108	147	43
9	Stjernen	44	7	30	7	4	3	94	174	32
10	Trondheim Black Panthers	44	5	34	5	3	2	114	211	23

GP = Games played; W = Wins; L = Losses; T = Ties; OTW = Overtime Wins; OTL = Overtime losses; GF = Goals for; GA = Goals against; PTS = Points
Source: hockey.no

=== Statistics ===
==== Scoring leaders ====
Player	Team	GP	G	A	Pts	+/–	PIM
(Canada) Chris Abbott	Frisk Tigers	-	32	43	75	+21	155
(Canada) Cam Abbott	Frisk Tigers	-	35	30	65	+22	158
(Norway) Mats Zuccarello Aasen	Frisk Tigers	-	24	40	64	+14	48
(Sweden) Marcus Eriksson	Frisk Tigers	-	27	26	53	+4	94
(Canada) Nathan Martz	Storhamar Dragons	-	15	37	52	+37	110
(Finland) Tomi Pöllänen	Lillehammer	-	21	29	50	+11	38
(Canada) Brendan Brooks	Stavanger Oilers	-	30	19	49	+12	58
(Finland) Teemu Kuusisto	Furuset	-	29	20	49	-12	72
(Czech Republic) Libor Pavlis	Trondheim Black Panthers	-	24	24	48	+2	46
(Sweden) Fredrik Sundin	Stavanger Oilers	-	23	23	46	+9	50

GP = Games played; G = Goals; A = Assists; Pts = Points; +/– = Plus/minus; PIM = Penalty minutes
Source: hockey.no

==== Leading goaltenders ====
Player	Team	GP	TOI	W	L	GA	SO	Sv%	GAA
(Norway) Pål Grotnes	Comet	-	2,931	-	-	106	-	91.53	2.17
(Norway) Ruben Smith	Storhamar Dragons	-	1,795	-	-	64	-	91.12	2.14
(Czech Republic) Zdeněk Kučírek	Lillehammer	-	1,076	-	-	42	-	90.56	2.34
(Norway) Tommy Lund	Vålerenga	-	1,024	-	-	37	-	89.78	2.17

GP = Games played; TOI = Time on ice (minutes); W = Wins; L = Losses; GA = Goals against; SO = Shutouts; Sv% = Save percentage; GAA = Goals against average
Source: hockey.no

==== Attendance ====
10 Teams	Regular Season	Playoffs				Total
10 Teams	Regular Season	Quarterfinale	Semifinale	Finale	Total Playoffs	Total
Games	220	22	11	6	39	259
Attendance	300,267	34,160	23,481	19,747	77.388	377,655
Average Attendance	1,365	1,553	2,135	3,291	1,984	1,458

== Playoff ==
Quarterfinals
1	Frisk Tigers	4
8	Furuset	1
3	Sparta Warriors	2
5	Comet	4
2	Vålerenga	4
7	Lillehammer	3
4	Storhamar Dragons
6	Stavanger Oilers

Semifinals
1	Frisk Tigers	4
5	Comet	1
2	Vålerenga	2
4	Storhamar Dragons	4

Finals
1	Frisk Tigers	2
4	Storhamar Dragons	4

Source: hockey.no

Norwegian Champions
2008
Storhamar Dragons
6th title

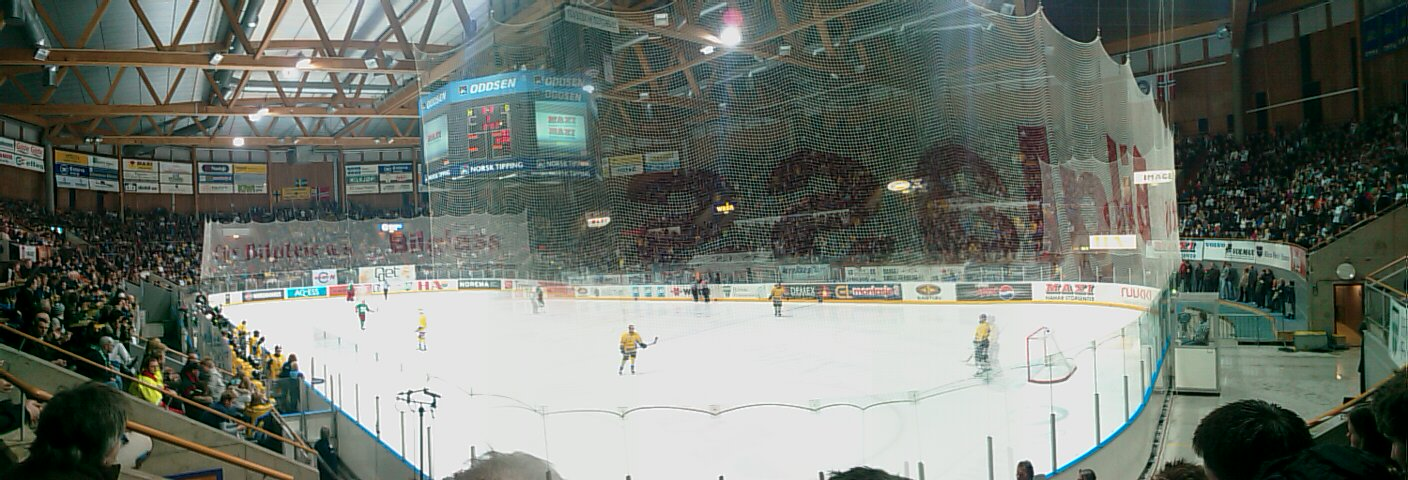

The deciding game was played at Hamar OL-Amfi

The Storhamar Dragons goaltender Ruben Smith was named the playoffs MVP.

== Promotion/Relegation ==
#	GET-ligaen	GP	W	L	T	OTW	OTL	GF	GA	PTS
1	Stjernen (P)	6	5	0	1	0	1	41	14	16
2	Lørenskog (P)	6	2	2	2	2	0	21	16	10
3	Grüner	6	2	4	0	0	0	16	30	6
4	Kongsvinger Knights	6	1	4	1	0	1	17	35	4

GP = Games played; W = Wins; L = Losses; T = Ties; OTW = Overtime Wins; OTL = Overtime losses; GF = Goals for; GA = Goals against; PTS = Points
Source: hockey.no
