= 2004–05 UPC-ligaen season =

- League: UPC-ligaen
- Sport: Ice hockey
- Teams: 10
- Regular-season winner: Vålerenga
- Champions: Vålerenga

GET-ligaen seasons
- 2003–04 season 2005–06 season

The 2004–05 UPC-ligaen was the 66th season of Norway's premier ice hockey league, Eliteserien, which as of this season became known as the UPC-ligaen after UPC had acquired the naming rights for five years. Vålerenga won both the League Championship and the Norwegian Championship, completing their nineteenth "double". A total of ten teams contested the league, including newcomers Comet who competed at the highest level for the first time.

The regular season commenced on 19 September 2004 and concluded on 20 February 2005. Vålerenga clinched their twenty-fifth league title after winning 3–2 in overtime against the Sparta Warriors on 17 February. This left them with an unassailable lead of seven points over the Trondheim Black Panthers, with only one round left to play. The result also confirmed Trondheim as runners-up ahead of the Storhamar Dragons.

The playoffs to determine the 2005 Norwegian Ice Hockey Champions were contested from 22 February to 20 March 2005. Vålerenga were crowned champions for the twenty-third time after defeating Trondheim by 4 games to 1 in the best-of-seven Final.

== Regular season ==
=== Final standings ===
	Team	GP	W	OTW	SOW	OTL	SOL	L	GF	GA	Pts
1	Vålerenga (C)	42	26	4	2	0	3	7	210	113	93
2	Trondheim Black Panthers	42	25	1	2	1	1	12	154	101	83
3	Storhamar Dragons	42	24	0	2	1	2	13	138	87	79
4	Stjernen	42	22	2	2	1	1	14	144	113	76
5	Frisk Tigers	42	20	3	3	0	4	12	143	137	76
6	Sparta Warriors	42	17	1	3	3	1	17	125	143	63
7	Stavanger Oilers	42	16	1	0	1	4	20	132	148	55
8	Lillehammer	42	11	0	4	2	1	24	116	161	44
9	Comet	42	11	0	0	2	2	27	109	174	37
10	Bergen Flyers	42	6	0	2	1	1	32	114	212	24

GP = Games played; W = Wins; L = Losses; OTW = Overtime Wins; OTL = Overtime losses; SOW = Shootout Wins; SOL = Shootout losses; PCT = Percent of possible points; GF = Goals for; GA = Goals against; PIM = Penalties in minutes; Pts = Points; C = Champions
Source: hockey.no

=== Statistics ===
==== Scoring leaders ====
The following players led the league in points at the conclusion of the regular season.

Player	Team	GP	G	A	Pts	+/–	PIM
(Russia) Ilya Dubkov	Trondheim Black Panthers	42	27	42	69	+32	52
(Canada) Nick Smith	Trondheim Black Panthers	38	28	32	60	+32	81
(Norway) Lars Erik Spets	Trondheim Black Panthers	42	29	26	55	+33	12
(Finland) Tomi Pöllänen	Frisk Tigers	40	19	32	51	+18	22
(Finland) Markku Takala	Sparta Warriors	41	19	31	50	−8	62
(Czech Republic) Tomáš Sršeň	Lillehammer	41	20	27	47	0	102
(Finland) Teemu Kohvakka	Stavanger Oilers	42	18	24	42	+8	30
(Finland) Tomi Suoniemi	Stavanger Oilers	37	16	25	41	+14	39
(Czech Republic) Ondřej Steiner	Stjernen	37	16	24	40	+9	41
(Czech Republic) Michal Kaňka	Lillehammer	42	25	14	39	+9	20
(Norway) Vegar Barlie	Vålerenga	37	19	20	39	+24	22
(Norway) Kenneth Larsen	Vålerenga	42	15	24	39	+30	18

GP = Games played; G = Goals; A = Assists; Pts = Points; +/– = Plus–minus; PIM = Penalty minutes

==== Leading goaltenders ====
The following goaltenders led the league in goals against average at the conclusion of the regular season.

Player	Team	GP	TOI	W	L	GA	SO	Sv%	GAA
(Canada) Chris Mason	Vålerenga	20	1,203:56	–	–	36	1	93.5	1.79
(Norway) Jonas Norgren	Storhamar Dragons	35	2,028:03	21	14	61	6	93.4	1.80
(Norway) Joakim Wiberg	Trondheim Black Panthers	31	1,847:22	–	–	73	2	91.6	2.37
(Finland) Kimmo Kytölaakso	Stjernen	38	2,243:44	–	–	95	4	91.5	2.54
(Norway) Arne Villy Skrøder	Sparta Warriors	18	1,018:25	–	–	48	0	90.2	2.83

GP = Games played; TOI = Time on ice (minutes); W = Wins; L = Losses; GA = Goals against; SO = Shutouts; Sv% = Save percentage; GAA = Goals against average

=== Attendance ===
For the 2004–05 season, the league attendance totaled 292,711 spectators for an average of 1,394. This was a 9.3% increase from the previous season's total of 267,707 spectators and average of 1,275.

Team	Arena	Capacity	Total	Games	Average	% of Capacity
Storhamar Dragons	Hamar OL-Amfi	6,091	44,175	21	2,104	34.5%
Vålerenga	Jordal Amfi	4,450	38,486	21	1,833	41.2%
Sparta Warriors	Sparta Amfi	3,707	27,285	21	1,299	35.0%
Lillehammer	Kristins Hall	3,194	23,679	21	1,128	35.3%
Bergen Flyers	Bergenshallen	3,000	12,133	21	578	19.3%
Trondheim Black Panthers	Leangen Ishall	3,000	39,076	21	1,861	62.0%
Stavanger Oilers	Siddishallen	2,582	37,665	21	1,794	69.5%
Stjernen	Stjernehallen	2,473	31,105	21	1,481	59.9%
Frisk Tigers	Askerhallen	2,400	23,210	21	1,105	46.0%
Comet	Halden Ishall	1,200	15,897	21	757	63.1%

Total	Games	Average
292,711	210	1,394

== Playoffs ==
=== Bracket ===
Quarter-finals
1	Vålerenga	3
7	Stavanger Oilers	0
2	Trondheim Black Panthers	3
8	Lillehammer	0
(Pairings are reseeded after the first round)
3	Storhamar Dragons	3
6	Sparta Warriors	1
4	Stjernen	3
5	Frisk Tigers	1

Semi-finals
1	Vålerenga	3
4	Stjernen	0
2	Trondheim Black Panthers	3
3	Storhamar Dragons	0

Finals
1	Vålerenga	4
2	Trondheim Black Panthers	1

Source: hockey.no

Norwegian Champions
2005

23rd title

== Qualifying for UPC-ligaen 2005–06 ==
=== Final standings ===
	Team	GP	W	OTW	SOW	OTL	SOL	L	GF	GA	Pts
1	Comet (Q)	6	4	0	1	0	0	1	30	9	14
2	Manglerud Star (Q)	6	2	0	1	0	1	3	13	16	9
3	Bergen Flyers	6	3	0	0	0	0	3	17	20	9
4	Furuset	6	1	0	0	0	1	4	13	28	4

GP = Games played; W = Wins; L = Losses; OTW = Overtime Wins; OTL = Overtime losses; SOW = Shootout Wins; SOL = Shootout losses; PCT = Percentage of possible points; GF = Goals for; GA = Goals against; PIM = Penalties in minutes; Pts = Points; Q = Qualified
Source: speaker.no

=== Game log ===
Qualifying for UPC-ligaen 2005–06 Game Log
Rounds 1–6

Round 1

24 February 2005; 18:30 CET	Comet	8–2 (2–2, 5–0, 1–0)	Furuset	Halden Ishall, Halden

Game reference
			Referee: Eirik Hansen
24 min	Penalties	8 min	Referee: Eirik Hansen
29	Shots	25	Referee: Eirik Hansen

24 February 2005; 18:30 CET	Manglerud Star	1–4 (0–2, 1–0, 0–2)	Bergen Flyers	Manglerudhallen, Oslo

Game reference
			Referee: Hans Petter Berg
8 min	Penalties	12 min	Referee: Hans Petter Berg
22	Shots	20	Referee: Hans Petter Berg

Round 2

27 February 2005; 17:00 CET	Furuset	3–6 (0–2, 0–3, 3–1)	Bergen Flyers	Furuset Forum, Oslo

Game reference
			Referee: Eirik Hansen
16 min	Penalties	18 min	Referee: Eirik Hansen
34	Shots	25	Referee: Eirik Hansen

27 February 2005; 17:00 CET	Manglerud Star	1 – 2 (SO) (1–0, 0–0, 0–1, 0–0, 2/5–3/5)	Comet	Manglerudhallen, Oslo

Game reference
			Referee: Per Gustav Solem
22 min	Penalties	18 min	Referee: Per Gustav Solem
15	Shots	51	Referee: Per Gustav Solem

Round 3

3 March 2005; 18:30 CET	Bergen Flyers	1–7 (1–1, 0–3, 0–3)	Comet	Bergenshallen, Bergen

Game reference
			Referee: Eirik Hansen
14 min	Penalties	12 min	Referee: Eirik Hansen
33	Shots	28	Referee: Eirik Hansen

3 March 2005; 19:00 CET	Furuset	2 – 3 (SO) (0–0, 2–1, 0–1, 0–0, 1/5–2/5)	Manglerud Star	Furuset Forum, Oslo

Game reference
			Referee: Hans Petter Berg
6 min	Penalties	6 min	Referee: Hans Petter Berg
29	Shots	29	Referee: Hans Petter Berg

Round 4

6 March 2005; 17:00 CET	Bergen Flyers	1–5 (0–1, 1–1, 0–3)	Manglerud Star	Bergenshallen, Bergen

Game reference
			Referee: Yngvar Skau Jensen
32 min	Penalties	14 min	Referee: Yngvar Skau Jensen
25	Shots	28	Referee: Yngvar Skau Jensen

6 March 2005; 17:00 CET	Furuset	2–6 (1–1, 0–3, 1–2)	Comet	Furuset Forum, Oslo

Game reference
			Referee: Owe Lüthcke
24 min	Penalties	20 min	Referee: Owe Lüthcke
28	Shots	37	Referee: Owe Lüthcke

Round 5

10 March 2005; 18:30 CET	Bergen	2–3 (1–1, 0–1, 1–1)	Furuset	Bergenshallen, Bergen

Game reference
			Referee: Hans Petter Berg
24 min	Penalties	12 min	Referee: Hans Petter Berg
30	Shots	17	Referee: Hans Petter Berg

10 March 2005; 18:30 CET	Comet	6–0 (4–0, 1–0, 1–0)	Manglerud Star	Halden Ishall, Halden

Game reference
			Referee: Eirik Hansen
8 min	Penalties	10 min	Referee: Eirik Hansen
21	Shots	21	Referee: Eirik Hansen

Round 6

13 March 2005; 17:00 CET	Comet	1–3 (0–0, 1–1, 0–2)	Bergen Flyers	Halden Ishall, Halden

Game reference
			Referee: Yngvar Skau Jensen
6 min	Penalties	2 min	Referee: Yngvar Skau Jensen
49	Shots	21	Referee: Yngvar Skau Jensen

13 March 2005; 17:00 CET	Manglerud Star	3–1 (0–0, 2–1, 1–0)	Furuset	Manglerudhallen, Oslo

Game reference
			Referee: Tommy Søstumoen
10 min	Penalties	8 min	Referee: Tommy Søstumoen
20	Shots	22	Referee: Tommy Søstumoen

== Awards ==
All-Star team

The following players were selected to the 2004–05 UPC-ligaen All-Star team:

- Goaltender: Chris Mason (Vålerenga)
- Defenceman: Duane Harmer (Trondheim)
- Defenceman: Anders Myrvold (Vålerenga)
- Center: Ilya Dubkov (Trondheim)
- Winger: Lars Erik Spets (Trondheim)
- Winger: Nick Smith (Trondheim)

Other

- Coach of the year: Tommy Sandlin (Trondheim)
