= 2003–04 Eliteserien season =

- League: Eliteserien
- Sport: Ice hockey
- Number of teams: 10
- Regular-season winner: Storhamar Dragons
- Champions: Storhamar Dragons

GET-ligaen seasons
- ← 2002–03 season 2004–05 season →

The 2003–04 Eliteserien season ended with Storhamar Dragons claiming their fifth Norwegian title after defeating Vålerenga in double overtime in game 7. Michael Smithurst scored the game winner nearly two minutes into the second extra period in front of 7,405 spectators.

== Regular season ==
=== Final standings ===
Rk	Team	Pts	W	OTW	OTL	L	GF–GA
1	Storhamar Dragons	94	29	2	3	8	151–87
2	Vålerenga	92	28	3	2	9	183–89
3	Trondheim Black Panthers	83	25	3	2	12	160–100
4	Frisk Tigers	74	20	5	4	13	152–118
5	Sparta Warriors	64	19	2	3	18	124–126
6	Stavanger Oilers	63	19	1	4	18	163–152
7	Stjernen	62	16	6	2	19	152–137
8	Bergen Flyers	43	11	3	4	24	105–173
9	Lillehammer	42	12	2	2	26	101–154
10	Manglerud Star	13	4	0	1	37	80–235

=== Statistics ===
==== Scoring leaders ====
The following players led the league in points at the conclusion of the regular season.

Player	Team	GP	G	A	Pts	+/–	PIM
(Finland) Jari Kesti	Stavanger Oilers	40	26	37	63	+31	40
(Finland) Tommy Kiviaho	Frisk Tigers	41	27	27	54	+23	20
(Russia) Ilya Dubkov	Trondheim Black Panthers	42	32	21	53	+29	70
(Finland) Tomi Suoniemi	Stavanger Oilers	40	20	25	45	+17	20
(Finland) Teemu Kohvakka	Stavanger Oilers	41	18	27	45	+5	80
(Norway) Tom Erik Olsen	Storhamar Dragons	40	28	16	44	+32	18
(Sweden) Patric Englund	Vålerenga	40	21	23	44	+23	20
(Norway) Lars Erik Spets	Lillehammer	40	28	15	43	−10	12
(Norway) Morten Bakkene	Stavanger Oilers	41	23	20	43	+19	18
(Norway) Jan Morten Dahl	Trondheim Black Panthers	40	10	31	41	+20	147

GP = Games played; G = Goals; A = Assists; Pts = Points; +/– = Plus–minus; PIM = Penalty minutes

==== Leading goaltenders ====
The following goaltenders led the league in goals against average at the conclusion of the regular season.

Player	Team	GP	TOI	W	L	GA	SO	Sv%	GAA
(Norway) Jonas Bertil Norgren	Storhamar Dragons	22	1,285:41	–	–	34	6	92.34	1.59
(Norway) Tommy Lund	Vålerenga	29	1,736:29	–	–	61	5	91.13	2.11
(Sweden) Henrik Smångs	Sparta Warriors	29	1,807:55	–	–	84	1	90.75	2.79
(Norway) Halvor Hårstad-Evjen	Frisk Tigers	28	1,568:52	–	–	61	2	90.72	2.33
(Norway) Rolf Joakim Wiberg	Trondheim Black Panthers	41	2,428:22	–	–	89	5	90.65	2.20

GP = Games played; TOI = Time on ice (minutes); W = Wins; L = Losses; GA = Goals against; SO = Shutouts; Sv% = Save percentage; GAA = Goals against average

== Playoffs ==
After the regular season, the new standard of eight teams qualified for the playoffs. In the first round, the two highest remaining seeds were drawn against the two lowest remaining seeds; in the second round, the highest remaining seed was drawn against one of the two lowest. In each round the higher-seeded team was awarded home ice advantage, giving them a possible maximum of three home games as opposed to the lower-seeded team's possible maximum of two. Each best-of-five series followed a 1–2–1–1 format: the higher-seeded team played at home for games 2 and 3 (plus 5 if necessary), and the lower-seeded team at home for games 1 and 4 (if necessary).

The final was contested between the Storhamar Dragons and Vålerenga for the second consecutive year. In 2003, the championship had been decided in four straight games when Vålerenga won 4–0 to claim their 22nd title and 18th "double". As in the previous season, the 2004 final was played as a best-of-seven series following a 1–1–1–2–1–1 format. Storhamar, as league champions, were seeded first and played at home for games 2, 4, 5 and 7. They took the lead after winning the first game 2–1 in overtime, but failed to capitalize, losing their first home game 0–4. The third and fourth games were both won by the home side. Game 5 saw Vålerenga achieve an away win in overtime to lead the series 3–2, but Storhamar came back to claim another overtime victory in Oslo and force a seventh, championship deciding game at Hamar OL-Amfi. A record 7,405 spectators turned out for the first game 7 in the history of the Norwegian Championship, in which Storhamar's Michael Smithurst scored the winning goal after 21 minutes and 54 seconds of overtime.

=== Bracket ===
Quarter-finals
1	Storhamar Dragons	3
8	Bergen Flyers	0
2	Vålerenga	3
7	Stjernen	1
(Pairings are reseeded after the first round)
3	Trondheim Black Panthers	1
6	Stavanger Oilers	3
4	Sparta Bears	3
5	Frisk Tigers	2

Semi-finals
1	Storhamar Dragons	3
6	Stavanger Oilers	0
2	Vålerenga	3
4	Sparta Bears	1

Finals
1	Storhamar Dragons	4
2	Vålerenga	3

Source: hockey.no

Norwegian Champions
2004
Storhamar Dragons
5th title

== Qualifying for UPC-ligaen 2004–05 ==
=== Final standings ===
	Team	GP	W	OTW	SOW	OTL	SOL	L	GF	GA	Pts
1	Lillehammer (Q)	6	4	0	0	1	0	1	22	14	13
2	Comet (Q)	6	2	2	1	0	0	1	24	15	12
3	Manglerud Star	6	3	0	1	1	1	4	26	19	11
4	Hasle/Løren	6	0	0	0	0	0	6	15	39	0

GP = Games played; W = Wins; L = Losses; OTW = Overtime Wins; OTL = Overtime losses; SOW = Shootout Wins; SOL = Shootout losses; GF = Goals for; GA = Goals against; Pts = Points; Q = Qualified
Source: speaker.no

=== Game log ===
Qualifying for UPC-ligaen 2004–05 Game Log
Rounds 1–6

Round 1

26 February 2004; 18:30 CET	Hasle/Løren	4 – 7 (1–2, 1–2, 2–3)	Manglerud Star	Løren Ishall, Oslo; Attendance: 253

Game reference
			Referee: Lars Olav Gaden
10 min	Penalties	10 min	Referee: Lars Olav Gaden
31	Shots	30	Referee: Lars Olav Gaden

26 February 2004; 18:30 CET	Lillehammer	3 – 4 (OT) (1–1, 0–1, 2–1, 0–1)	Comet	Kristins Hall, Lillehammer; Attendance: 1,101

Game reference
			Referee: Owe Lüthcke
83 min	Penalties	18 min	Referee: Owe Lüthcke
21	Shots	27	Referee: Owe Lüthcke

Round 2

29 February 2004; 17:00 CET	Comet	4 – 3 (SO) (1–0, 0–3, 2–0, 1–0, 2/5–1/5)	Manglerud Star	Halden Ishall, Halden; Attendance: 833

Game reference
			Referee: Yngvar Skau Jensen
4 min	Penalties	2 min	Referee: Yngvar Skau Jensen
25	Shots	27	Referee: Yngvar Skau Jensen

29 February 2004; 17:00 CET	Hasle/Løren	2 – 4 (1–2, 0–2, 1–0)	Lillehammer	Løren Ishall, Oslo; Attendance: 223

Game reference
			Referee: Kjetil Bøe
44 min	Penalties	20 min	Referee: Kjetil Bøe
26	Shots	26	Referee: Kjetil Bøe

Round 3

4 March 2004; 18:30 CET	Comet	7 – 2 (3–1, 2–0, 2–1)	Hasle/Løren	Halden Ishall, Halden; Attendance: 750

Game reference
			Referee: Egil Andre Borge
12 min	Penalties	14 min	Referee: Egil Andre Borge
34	Shots	27	Referee: Egil Andre Borge

4 March 2004; 18:30 CET	Manglerud Star	1 – 3 (0–1, 1–0, 0–2)	Lillehammer	Manglerudhallen, Oslo; Attendance: 382

Game reference
			Referee: Pål Idar Sørensen
8 min	Penalties	6 min	Referee: Pål Idar Sørensen
23	Shots	25	Referee: Pål Idar Sørensen

Round 4

7 March 2004; 17:00 CET	Comet	0 – 2 (0–0, 0–1, 0–1)	Lillehammer	Halden Ishall, Halden; Attendance: 1,050

Game reference
			Referee: Hans Petter Berg
12 min	Penalties	16 min	Referee: Hans Petter Berg
29	Shots	20	Referee: Hans Petter Berg

7 March 2004; 17:00 CET	Manglerud Star	8 – 2 (2–0, 4–2, 2–0)	Hasle/Løren	Manglerudhallen, Oslo; Attendance: 322

Game reference
			Referee: Per Gustav Solem
10 min	Penalties	14 min	Referee: Per Gustav Solem
37	Shots	25	Referee: Per Gustav Solem

Round 5

11 March 2004; 18:30 CET	Lillehammer	7 – 2 (2–1, 4–0, 1–1)	Hasle/Løren	Kristins Hall, Lillehammer; Attendance: 850

Game reference
			Referee: Tommy Søstumoen
2 min	Penalties	4 min	Referee: Tommy Søstumoen
42	Shots	25	Referee: Tommy Søstumoen

11 March 2004; 18:30 CET	Manglerud Star	2 – 3 (OT) (1–1, 1–1, 0–0, 0–1)	Comet	Manglerudhallen, Oslo; Attendance: 720

Game reference
			Referee: Yngvar Skau Jensen
8 min	Penalties	8 min	Referee: Yngvar Skau Jensen
35	Shots	41	Referee: Yngvar Skau Jensen

Round 6

14 March 2004; 17:00 CET	Hasle/Løren	3 – 6 (1–1, 2–1, 0–4)	Comet	Løren Ishall, Oslo; Attendance: 500

Game reference
			Referee: Owe Lüthcke
10 min	Penalties	12 min	Referee: Owe Lüthcke
22	Shots	40	Referee: Owe Lüthcke

14 March 2004; 17:00 CET	Lillehammer	3 – 5 (2–1, 0–3, 1–1)	Manglerud Star	Kristins Hall, Lillehammer; Attendance: 1,280

Game reference
			Referee: Svein-Erik Edvartsen
8 min	Penalties	4 min	Referee: Svein-Erik Edvartsen
19	Shots	25	Referee: Svein-Erik Edvartsen
