= 2005–06 UPC-ligaen season =

- League: UPC-ligaen
- Sport: Ice hockey
- Number of teams: 10
- Regular-season winner: Vålerenga Ishockey
- Champions: Vålerenga Ishockey

UPC-ligaen seasons
- ← 2004–05 season 2006–07 season →

The 2005–06 UPC-ligaen season began on 22 September 2005 and ended 19 February 2006.

== Regular season ==
=== Final standings ===
#	GET-ligaen	GP	W	L	T	OTW	OTL	GF	GA	PTS
1	Storhamar Dragons (C)	42	34	4	4	2	2	202	82	108
2	Stjernen	42	23	10	9	1	8	177	129	79
3	Vålerenga	42	21	13	8	4	4	152	112	75
4	Stavanger Oilers	42	19	14	9	5	4	131	128	71
5	Sparta Warriors	42	19	19	4	3	1	140	155	64
6	Comet	42	16	17	9	6	3	154	150	63
7	Frisk Tigers	42	16	17	9	3	6	139	151	63
8	Lillehammer	42	12	24	6	3	3	119	159	45
9	Trondheim Black Panthers	42	10	23	9	6	3	115	151	45
10	Manglerud Star	42	5	34	3	2	1	105	226	20

GP = Games played; W = Wins; L = Losses; T = Ties; OTW = Overtime Wins; OTL = Overtime losses; GF = Goals for; GA = Goals against; PTS = Points; (C)=Champions
Source: hockey.no

=== Statistics ===
==== Scoring leaders ====
Player	Team	GP	G	A	Pts	+/–	PIM
(Canada) Patrick Yetman	Storhamar Dragons	42	42	25	67	+57	16
(Norway) Mads Hansen	Storhamar Dragons	41	20	47	67	+54	24
(Czech Republic) Tomáš Sršeň	Lillehammer	42	20	35	55	–6	120
(Sweden) Nicklas Rahm	Stjernen	42	15	40	55	+12	50
(Canada) Martin Kariya	Stjernen	39	15	37	52	+11	49
(Sweden) Göran Hermansson	Sparta Warriors	41	27	21	48	–6	98
(Russia) Ilya Dubkov	Trondheim Black Panthers	42	20	27	47	–9	48
(Sweden) Bobbie Hagelin	Stjernen	40	22	24	46	+21	44
(Sweden) Benny Rönnelöw	Comet	40	26	19	45	0	28
(Sweden) Kent Lindberg	Sparta Warriors	41	13	32	45	–2	72

GP = Games played; G = Goals; A = Assists; Pts = Points; +/– = Plus/minus; PIM = Penalty minutes
Source: hockey.no

==== Leading goaltenders ====
Player	Team	GP	Min	W	L	GA	SO	Sv%	GAA
(Norway) Jonas Bertil Norgren	Storhamar Dragons	37	2,105	-	-	55	7	93.37	1.57
(Canada) Tyrone Garner	Vålerenga	27	1,596	-	-	69	2	91.42	2.59
(Sweden) Bengt Höglund	Stavanger Oilers	40	2,450	-	-	119	2	89.94	2.91
(Czech Republic) Zdeněk Kučírek	Comet	32	1,872	-	-	99	0	89.91	3.17
(Norway) Rolf Joakim Wiberg	Trondheim Black Panthers	39	2,367	-	-	127	1	89.87	3.22

GP = Games played; Min = Minutes played; W = Wins; L = Losses; GA = Goals against; SO = Shutouts; Sv% = Save percentage; GAA = Goals against average
Source: hockey.no

== Playoffs ==
Quarterfinals
1	Storhamar Dragons	4
7	Frisk Tigers	0
3	Vålerenga	4
6	Comet	1
2	Stjernen	4
8	Lillehammer	1
4	Stavanger Oilers	4
5	Sparta Warriors	2

Semifinals
1	Storhamar Dragons	2
3	Vålerenga	4
2	Stjernen	3
4	Stavanger Oilers	4

Finals
3	Vålerenga	4
4	Stavanger Oilers	0

Norwegian Champions
2005–06
Vålerenga Ishockey
24th title

== Promotion/relegation ==
#	GET-ligaen	GP	W	L	T	OTW	OTL	GF	GA	PTS
1	Trondheim Black Panthers (P)	6	4	0	2	0	2	21	12	14
2	Furuset (P)	6	3	1	2	2	0	22	7	13
3	Manglerud Star	6	3	3	0	0	0	25	17	9
4	Gjøvik	6	0	6	0	0	0	8	40	0

GP = Games played; W = Wins; L = Losses; T = Ties; OTW = Overtime Wins; OTL = Overtime losses; GF = Goals for; GA = Goals against; PTS = Points
Source: hockey.no
