= 2002–03 Eliteserien season =

Norwegian ice hockey season

The 2002–03 Eliteserien season was the 64th season of ice hockey in Norway. Nine teams participated in the league, and Valerenga Ishockey won the championship.

== Regular season ==
	Club	GP	W	OTW	OTL	L	GF–GA	Pts
1.	Vålerenga Ishockey	38	30	3	1	4	224:91	97
2.	Storhamar Ishockey	38	21	4	4	9	170:101	75
3.	Frisk Asker	38	20	4	3	11	157:110	71
4.	Trondheim IK	38	15	6	4	13	135:122	61
5.	Stjernen	38	15	6	3	14	151:134	60
6.	Sparta Sarpsborg	38	15	1	6	16	118:138	53
7.	Manglerud Star Ishockey	38	12	2	5	19	127:141	45
8.	Lillehammer IK	38	11	3	3	21	140:155	42
9.	Lørenskog IK	38	2	1	1	34	58:288	9

== Playoffs ==
Quarter-finals
Trondheim IK	2
Stjernen	1
Frisk Asker	2
Sparta Sarpsborg	0

Semi-finals
Vålerenga Ishockey	3
Trondheim IK	0
Storhamar Ishockey	3
Frisk Asker	1

Final
Vålerenga Ishockey	4
Storhamar Ishockey	0

== Relegation ==
	Club	GP	W	T	L	GF–GA	Pts
1.	Stavanger Oilers	6	5	0	1	37:21	15
2.	Bergen IK	6	4	0	2	37:29	12
3.	Lørenskog IK	6	2	0	4	31:38	6
4.	Gjøvik	6	1	0	5	19:36	3
