= 2006–07 GET-ligaen season =

- League: GET-ligaen
- Sport: Ice hockey
- Number of teams: 10
- Regular-season winner: Sparta Warriors
- Champions: Vålerenga Ishockey

GET-ligaen seasons
- ← 2005–06 season 2007–08 season →

The 2006–07 GET-ligaen season began on 7 September 2006 and ended 22 February 2007.

== Regular season ==
=== Final standings ===
#	GET-ligaen	GP	W	L	T	OTW	OTL	GF	GA	PTS
1	Vålerenga (C)	44	32	7	5	3	2	206	97	104
2	Storhamar Dragons	44	29	8	7	4	3	185	100	98
3	Stavanger Oilers	44	25	12	7	2	5	192	149	84
4	Frisk Tigers	44	19	15	10	7	3	157	169	74
5	Sparta Warriors	44	21	17	6	4	2	182	147	73
6	Comet	44	19	19	6	1	5	156	146	64
7	Stjernen	44	16	24	4	0	4	148	194	52
8	Furuset	44	15	25	4	1	3	124	193	50
9	Lillehammer	44	9	28	7	5	2	123	175	39
10	Trondheim Black Panthers	44	5	35	4	3	1	112	215	22

GP = Games played; W = Wins; L = Losses; T = Ties; OTW = Overtime Wins; OTL = Overtime losses; GF = Goals for; GA = Goals against; PTS = Points; (C)=Champions
Source: hockey.no

=== Statistics ===
==== Scoring leaders ====
Player	Team	GP	G	A	Pts	+/–	PIM
(Norway) Jonas Solberg Andersen	Sparta Warriors	41	38	40	78	+16	40
(Norway) Mathis Olimb	Vålerenga	42	19	44	63	+24	59
(Norway) Mats Zuccarello	Frisk Tigers	43	34	25	59	-3	36
(Canada) Mike Oliveira	Lillehammer	39	26	33	59	-4	26
(Sweden) Kent Lindberg	Sparta Warriors	41	21	38	59	+21	36
(Norway) Lars Erik Lund	Vålerenga	43	20	37	57	+32	44
(Sweden) Henric Höglund	Stavanger Oilers	38	28	27	55	+5	103
(Finland) Teemu Kuusisto	Furuset	31	24	29	53	-14	103
(Sweden) Göran Hermansson	Sparta Warriors	41	26	25	51	+8	32
(Sweden) Andreas Pettersson	Stavanger Oilers	39	19	31	50	+13	52
(Czech Republic) Ondřej Steiner	Stjernen	38	18	32	50	+3	93
(Canada) Christian Larrivée	Storhamar Dragons	35	14	36	50	+12	12

GP = Games played; G = Goals; A = Assists; Pts = Points; +/– = Plus/minus; PIM = Penalty minutes
Source: hockey.no

==== Leading goaltenders ====
Player	Team	GP	Min	W	L	GA	SO	Sv%	GAA
(Sweden) Björn Bjurling	Vålerenga	35	2,027	-	-	69	5	92.52	2.04
(Norway) Jonas Bertil Norgren	Storhamar Dragons	25	1,449	-	-	53	4	91.55	2.19
(Norway) Ruben Smith	Storhamar Dragons	21	1,209	-	-	45	1	91.09	2.23
(Sweden) Bengt Höglund	Stavanger Oilers	35	2,189	-	-	122	0	89.12	3.34
(Norway) Pål Grotnes	Comet	32	1,971	-	-	96	3	88.98	2.92

GP = Games played; Min = Minutes played; W = Wins; L = Losses; GA = Goals against; SO = Shutouts; Sv% = Save percentage; GAA = Goals against average
Source: hockey.no

== Playoffs ==
Quarterfinals
1	Vålerenga	4
8	Furuset	0
4	Frisk Tigers	3
5	Sparta Warriors	4
2	Storhamar Dragons	4
7	Stjernen	2
3	Stavanger Oilers	2
6	Comet	4

Semifinals
1	Vålerenga	4
5	Sparta Warriors	2
2	Storhamar Dragons	4
3	Stavanger Oilers	2

Finals
1	Vålerenga	4
2	Storhamar Dragons	1

Source: hockey.no

Norwegian Champions
2006–07
Vålerenga Ishockey
25th title

== Promotion/Relegation ==
#	GET-ligaen	GP	W	L	T	OTW	OTL	GF	GA	PTS
1	Trondheim Black Panthers (P)	6	4	0	2	1	1	29	15	15
2	Lillehammer (P)	6	3	1	2	1	1	24	17	12
3	Lørenskog	6	1	4	1	1	0	11	26	5
4	Manglerud Star	6	1	4	1	0	1	12	17	4

GP = Games played; W = Wins; L = Losses; T = Ties; OTW = Overtime Wins; OTL = Overtime losses; GF = Goals for; GA = Goals against; PTS = Points; (P)=Promoted
Source: hockey.no
