= List of NHL statistical leaders by country of birth =

This is a list of National Hockey League statistical leaders by country of birth, sorted alphabetically. The top ten players from each country are included. Statistics are current through the end of the 2025–26 NHL season and players currently playing in the National Hockey League are marked in boldface.

All players are listed by the current country of the players' birth location, regardless of their citizenship, where they were trained in hockey or what country they represented internationally.

== Country ==
=== Australia ===
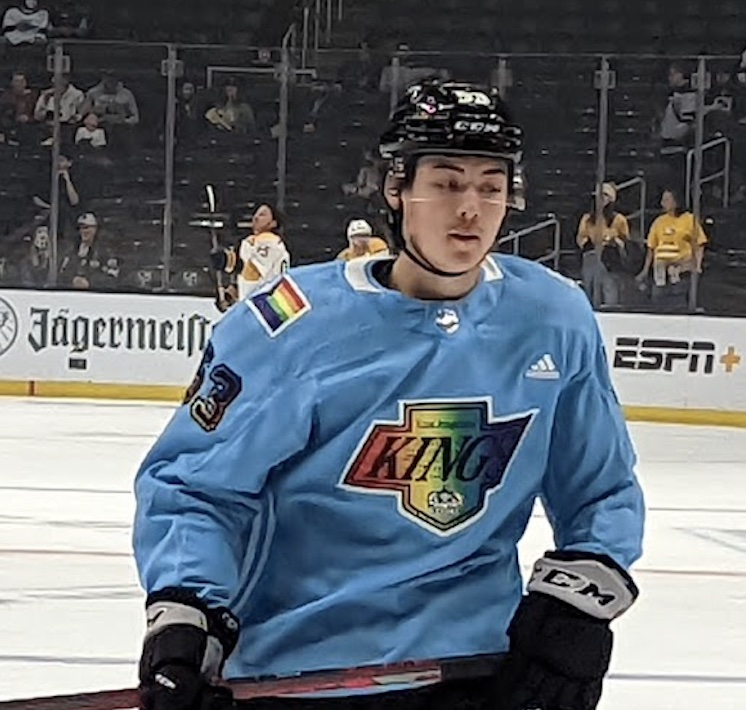
Jordan Spence is first player born in Australia to play in the NHL, although he represents Canada in international competition.

Rank	Name	Team(s)	GP	Pts	P/GP
1	**Jordan Spence**	LAK, OTT	253	92	0.36

=== Austria ===
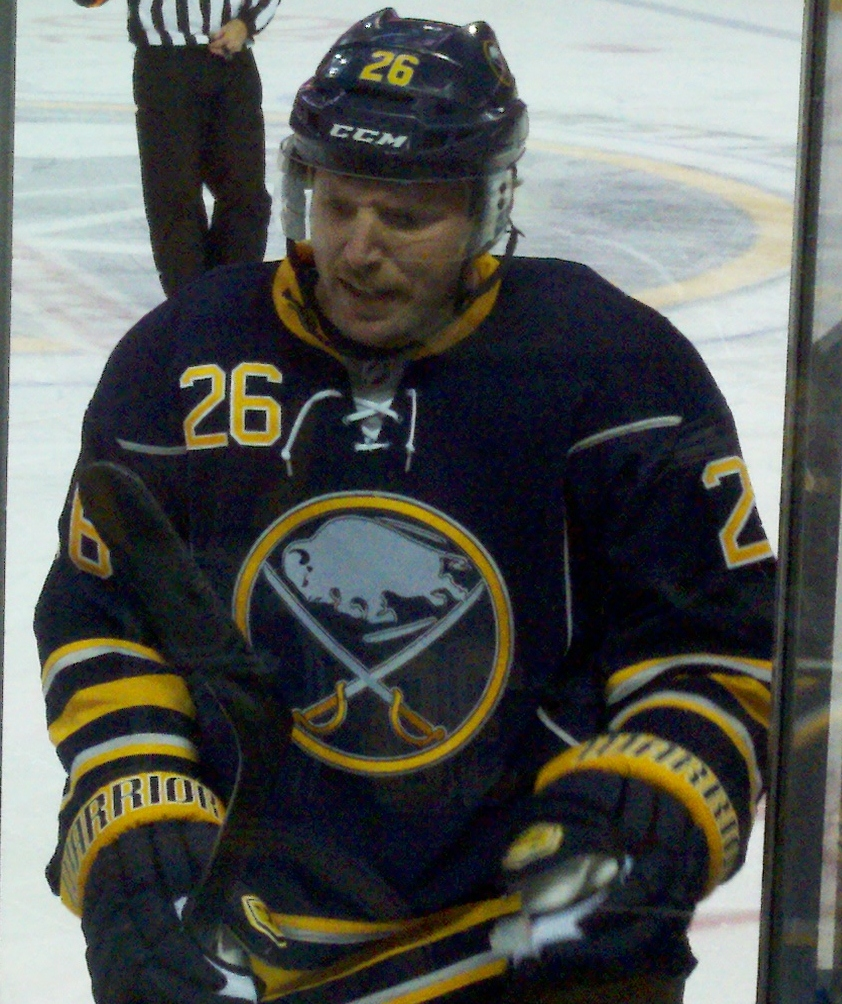
Thomas Vanek is the all-time leading point scorer from Austria.

Rank	Name	Team(s)	GP	Pts	P/GP
1	Thomas Vanek	BUF, NYI, MTL, MIN, DET, FLA, VAN, CBJ	1,029	789	0.77
2	**André Burakovsky**	WSH, COL, SEA, CHI	771	420	0.54
3	Michael Grabner	VAN, NYI, TOR, NYR, NJD, ARI	640	276	0.43
4	Michael Raffl	PHI, WSH, DAL	590	179	0.30
5	**Marco Rossi**	MIN, VAN	235	136	0.58
6	**Marco Kasper**	DET	159	56	0.41
7	Marko Daňo	CBJ, CHI, WPG, COL	141	45	0.32
8	Andreas Nödl	PHI, CAR	183	36	0.20
9	Thomas Pöck	NYR, NYI	118	17	0.14
10	Christoph Brandner	MIN	35	9	0.14

=== The Bahamas ===
Rank	Name	Team(s)	GP	Pts	P/GP
1	André Deveaux	TOR, NYR	31	2	0.06

=== Belarus ===
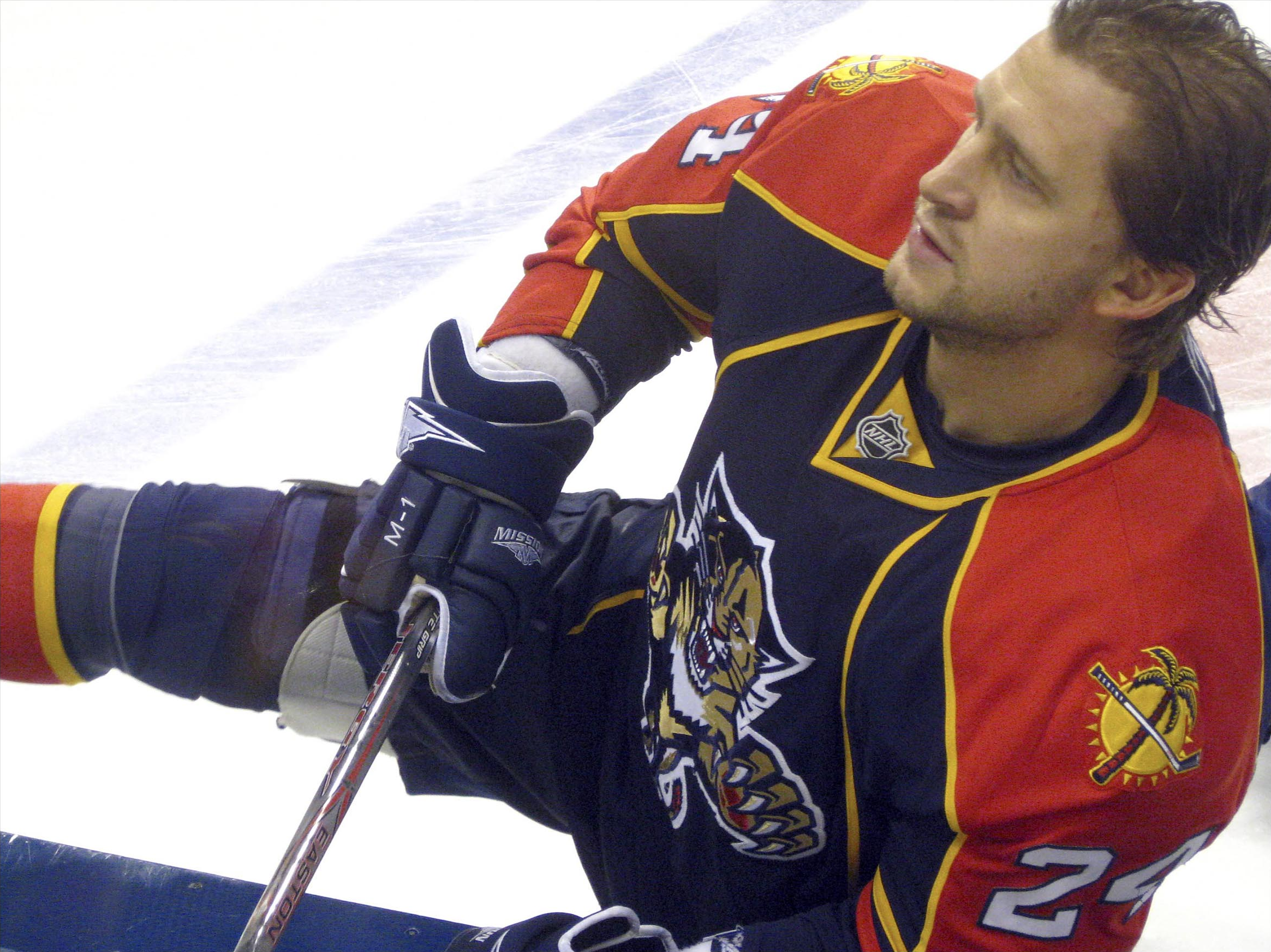
Ruslan Salei was the NHL's all-time leading point scorer from Belarus at the time of his death.

Rank	Name	Team(s)	GP	Pts	P/GP
1	**Yegor Sharangovich**	NJD, CGY	438	226	0.52
2	Andrei Kostitsyn	MTL, NSH	398	222	0.56
3	Ruslan Salei	ANA, FLA, COL, DET	917	204	0.22
4	Sergei Kostitsyn	MTL, NSH	353	176	0.50
5	**Aliaksei Protas**	WSH	321	171	0.53
6	John Miszuk	DET, CHI, PHI, MNS	237	46	0.19
7	Konstantin Koltsov	PIT	144	38	0.26
8	**Artyom Levshunov**	CHI	86	30	0.35
9	Sergei Bautin	WIN, DET, SJS	132	30	0.23
10	**Vladislav Kolyachonok**	ARI, UTA, PIT, DAL, BOS	87	17	0.20

=== Belgium ===
Rank	Name	Team(s)	GP	Pts	P/GP
1	Jan Benda	WSH	9	3	0.33

=== Brazil ===
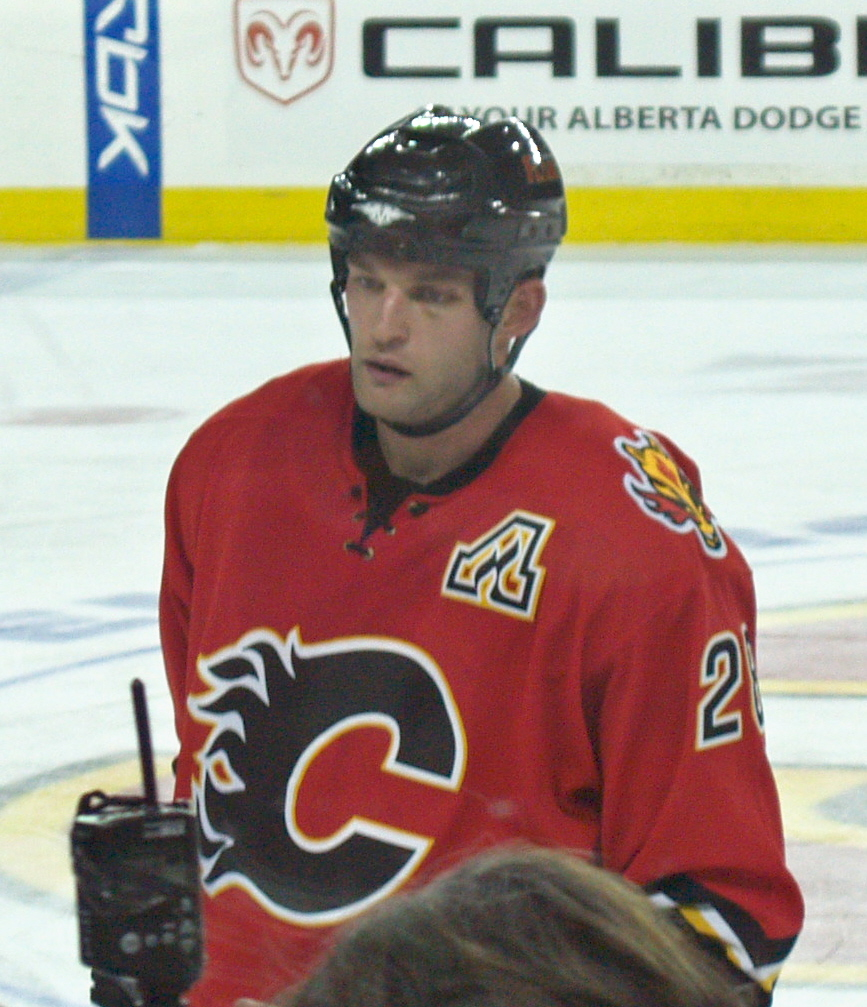
Robyn Regehr is the all-time leading point scorer from Brazil, where his parents were missionaries.

Rank	Name	Team(s)	GP	Pts	P/GP
1	Robyn Regehr	CGY, BUF, LAK	1,090	199	0.18
2	Mike Greenlay	EDM	2	1	0.50

=== Brunei ===
Rank	Name	Team(s)	GP	Pts	P/GP
1	Craig Adams	CAR, CHI, PIT	951	160	0.17

=== Bulgaria ===
Rank	Name	Team(s)	GP	Pts	P/GP
1	Alexandar Georgiev	NYR, COL, SJS	303	8	0.03

=== Canada ===
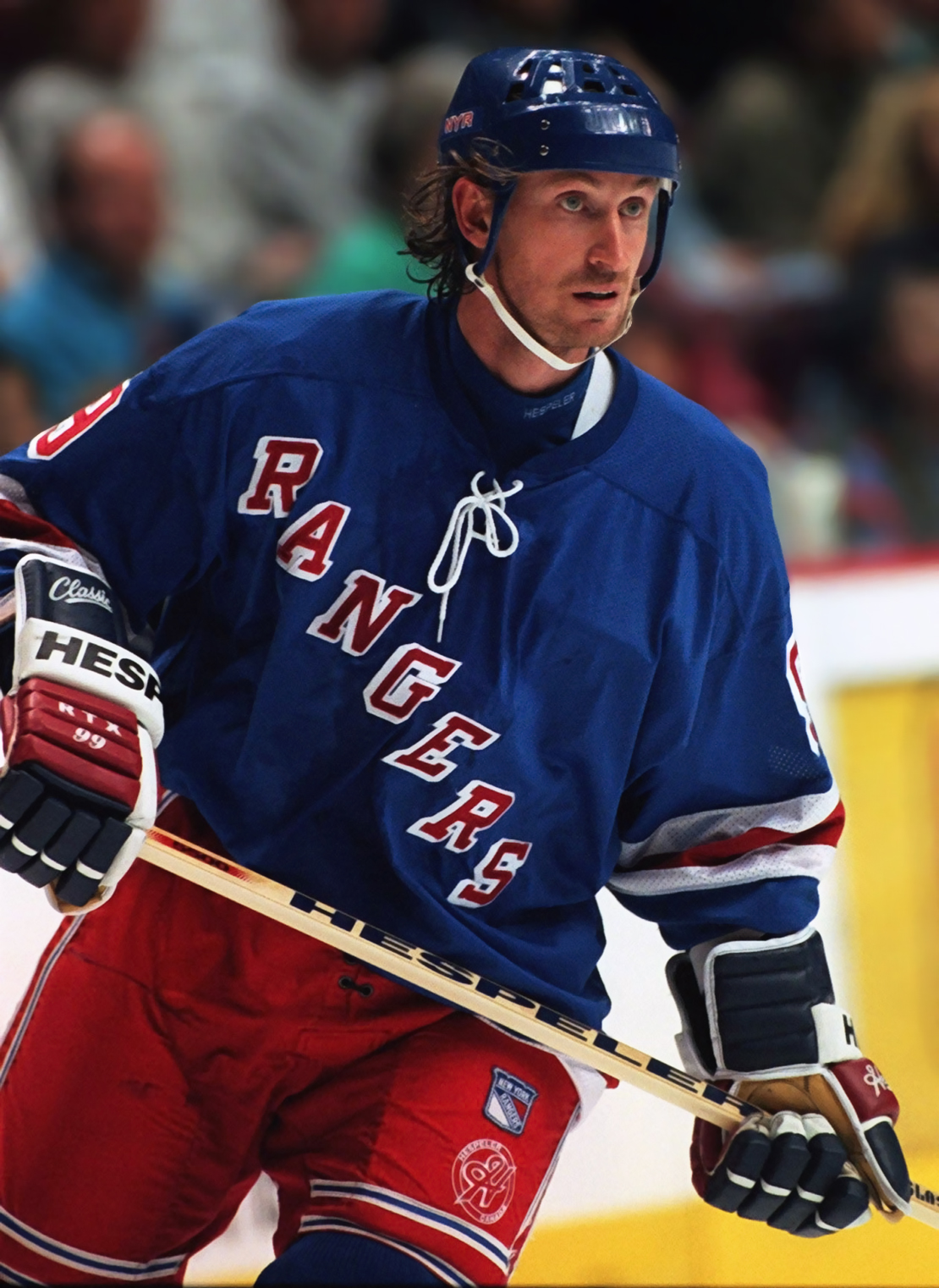
Wayne Gretzky is the all-time leader in points from any country.

Rank	Name	Team(s)	GP	Pts	P/GP
1	Wayne Gretzky	EDM, LAK, STL, NYR	1,487	2,857	1.92
2	Mark Messier	EDM, NYR, VAN, NYR	1,756	1,887	1.07
3	Gordie Howe	DET, HFD	1,767	1,850	1.05
4	Ron Francis	HFD/CAR, PIT, TOR	1,731	1,798	1.04
5	Marcel Dionne	DET, LAK, NYR	1,348	1,771	1.31
6	**Sidney Crosby**	PIT	1,420	1,761	1.24
7	Steve Yzerman	DET	1,514	1,755	1.16
8	Mario Lemieux	PIT	915	1,723	1.88
9	Joe Sakic	QUE/COL	1,378	1,641	1.19
10	Phil Esposito	CHI, BOS, NYR	1,282	1,590	1.24

=== Croatia ===
Rank	Name	Team(s)	GP	Pts	P/GP
1	Borna Rendulić	COL, VAN	15	2	0.13

=== Czech Republic ===
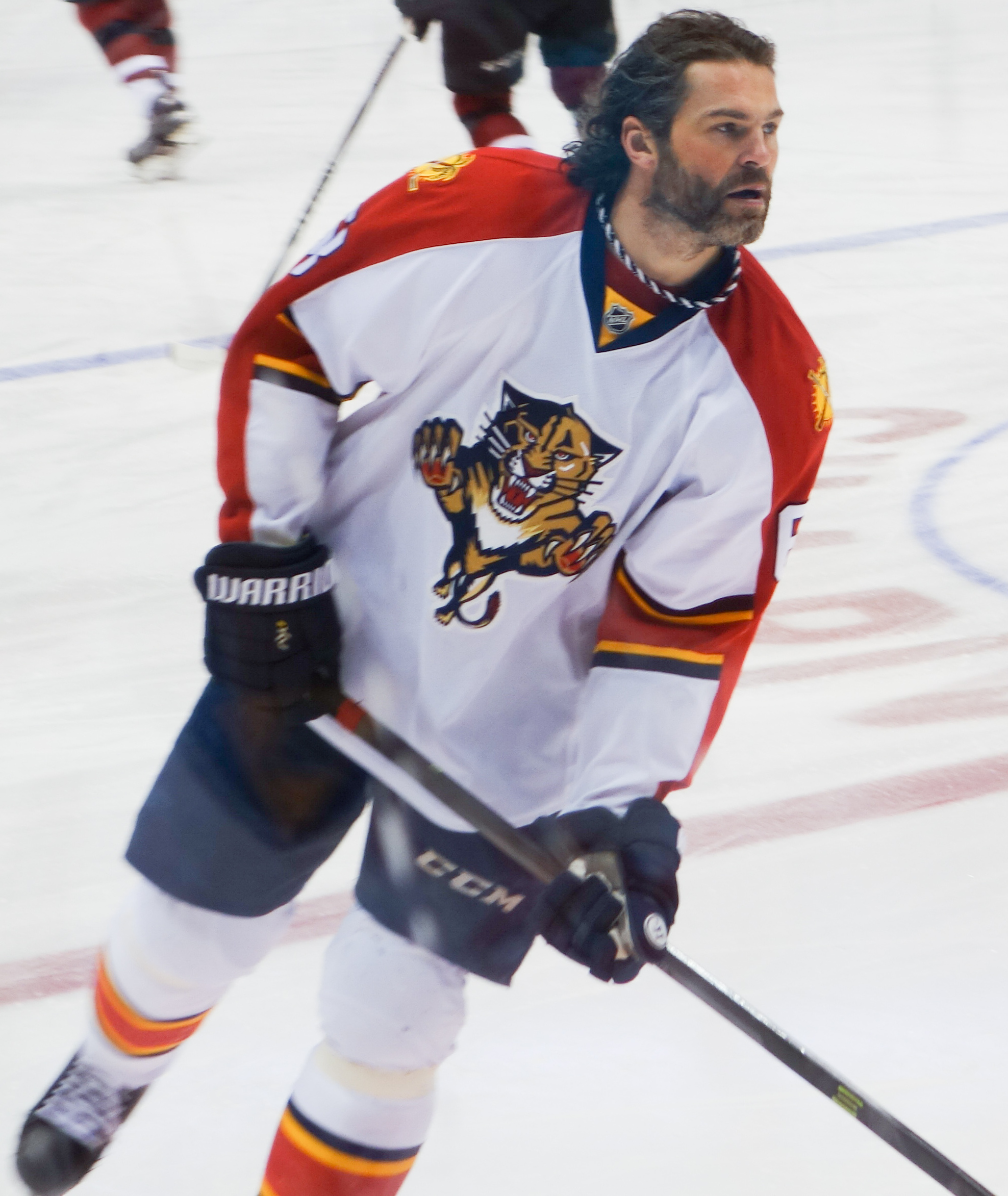
Jaromír Jágr has the second most points in NHL history.

Rank	Name	Team(s)	GP	Pts	P/GP
1	Jaromír Jágr	PIT, WSH, NYR, PHI, DAL, BOS, NJD, FLA, CGY	1,733	1,921	1.11
2	Patrik Eliáš	NJD	1,240	1,025	0.83
3	**David Pastrňák**	BOS	833	933	1.12
4	Jakub Voráček	CBJ, PHI	1,058	806	0.76
5	Milan Hejduk	COL	1,020	805	0.79
6	David Krejčí	BOS	1,032	786	0.76
7	Václav Prospal	PHI, OTT, FLA, TBL, ANA, NYR, CBJ	1,108	765	0.69
8	Bobby Holík	HFD, NJD, NYR, ATL	1,314	747	0.57
9	Petr Sýkora	NJD, ANA, NYR, EDM, PIT, MIN	1,017	721	0.71
10	Martin Straka	PIT, OTT, NYI, FLA LAK, NYR	954	717	0.75

=== Denmark ===
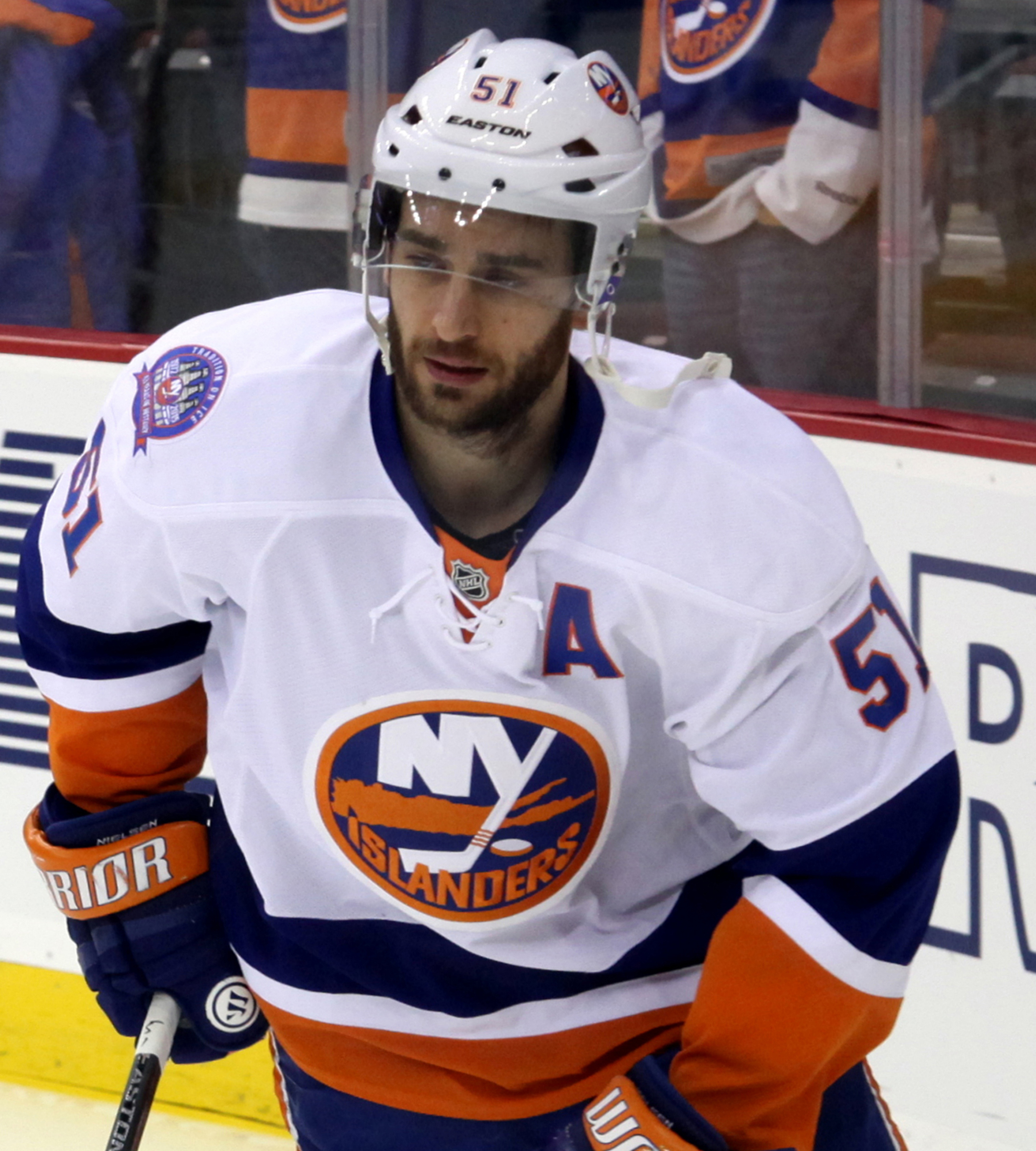
Frans Nielsen is the second-highest scorer from Denmark.

Rank	Name	Team(s)	GP	Pts	P/GP
1	**Nikolaj Ehlers**	WPG, CAR	756	591	0.78
2	Frans Nielsen	NYI, DET	925	473	0.51
3	**Lars Eller**	STL, MTL, WSH, COL, PIT, OTT	1,184	439	0.37
4	**Oliver Bjorkstrand**	CBJ, SEA, TBL	704	416	0.59
5	Mikkel Bødker	PHX/ARI, COL, SJS, OTT	709	327	0.46
6	Jannik Hansen	VAN, SJS	626	256	0.41
7	Peter Regin	OTT, NYI, CHI	243	67	0.28
8	Poul Popiel	BOS, LAK, DET, VAN, EDM	224	54	0.24
9	Philip Larsen	DAL, EDM, VAN	150	37	0.25
10	**Frederik Andersen**	ANA, TOR, CAR	552	17	0.03

=== Estonia ===
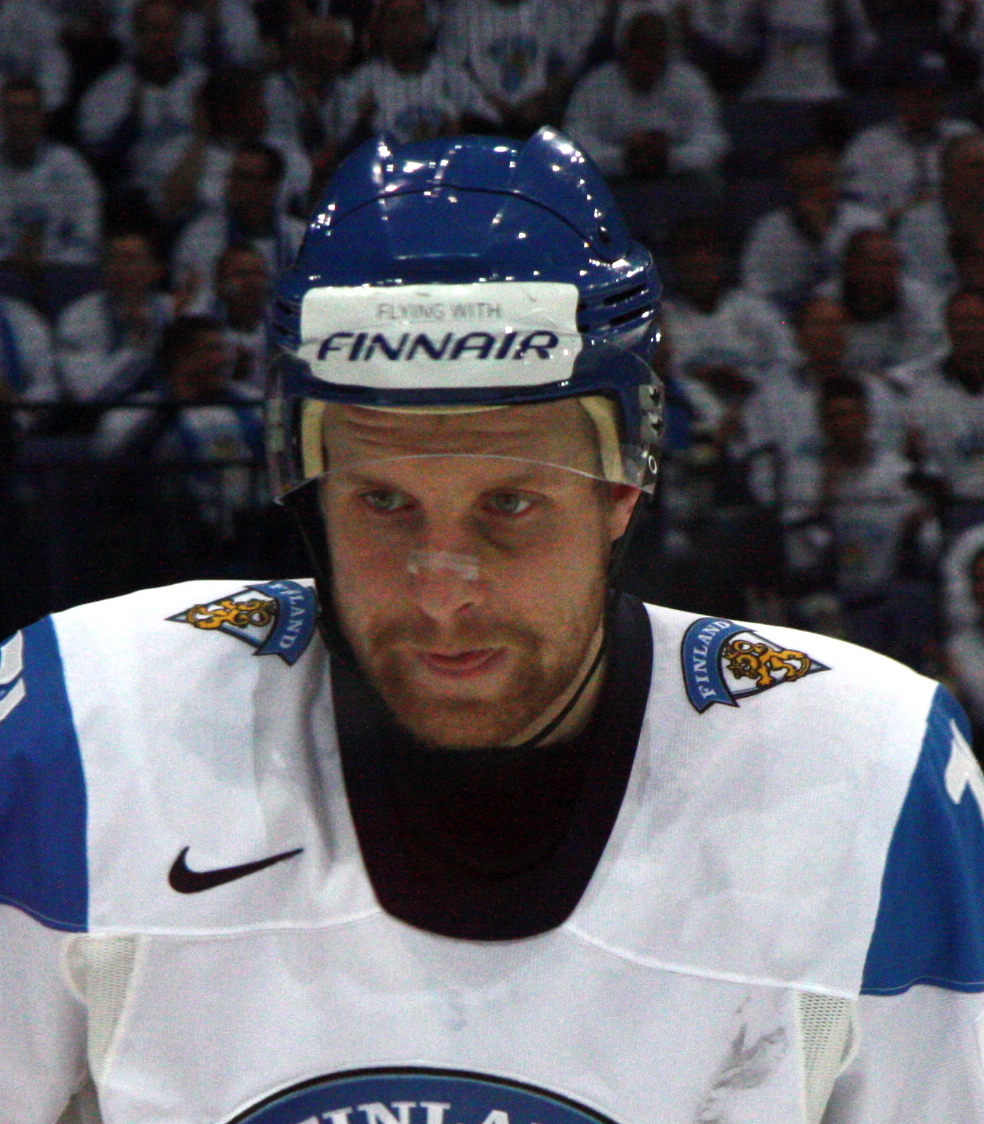
Leo Komarov is the only NHL player to be born in Estonia, though he represents Finland in international competition.

Rank	Name	Team(s)	GP	Pts	P/GP
1	Leo Komarov	TOR, NYI	491	170	0.35

=== Finland ===
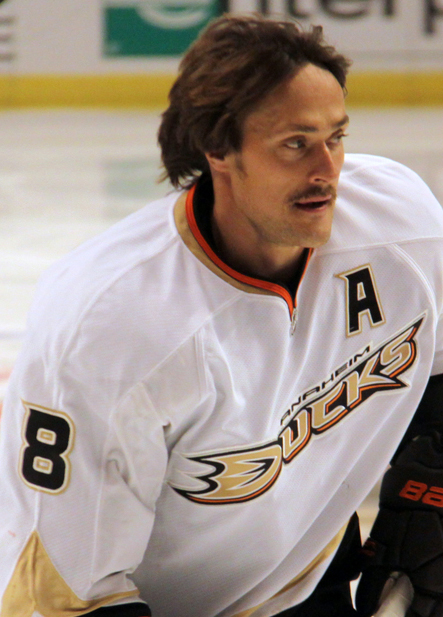
Teemu Selänne is Finland's all-time leading point scorer.

Rank	Name	Team(s)	GP	Pts	P/GP
1	Teemu Selänne	WIN, ANA, SJS, COL	1,451	1,457	1.00
2	Jari Kurri	EDM, LAK, NYR, ANA, COL	1,251	1,398	1.12
3	Tomas Sandström	NYR, LAK, PIT, DET, ANA	983	856	0.87
4	Saku Koivu	MTL, ANA	1,124	832	0.74
6	**Mikko Rantanen**	COL, CAR, DAL	716	782	1.09
6	**Aleksander Barkov**	FLA	804	782	0.97
7	Olli Jokinen	LAK, NYI, FLA, PHX, CGY, NYR, WPG, NSH, TOR, STL	1,231	750	0.61
8	**Sebastian Aho**	CAR	756	711	0.94
9	Mikko Koivu	MIN, CBJ	1,035	711	0.69
10	**Mikael Granlund**	MIN, NSH, PIT, SJS, DAL, ANA	960	661	0.68

=== France ===
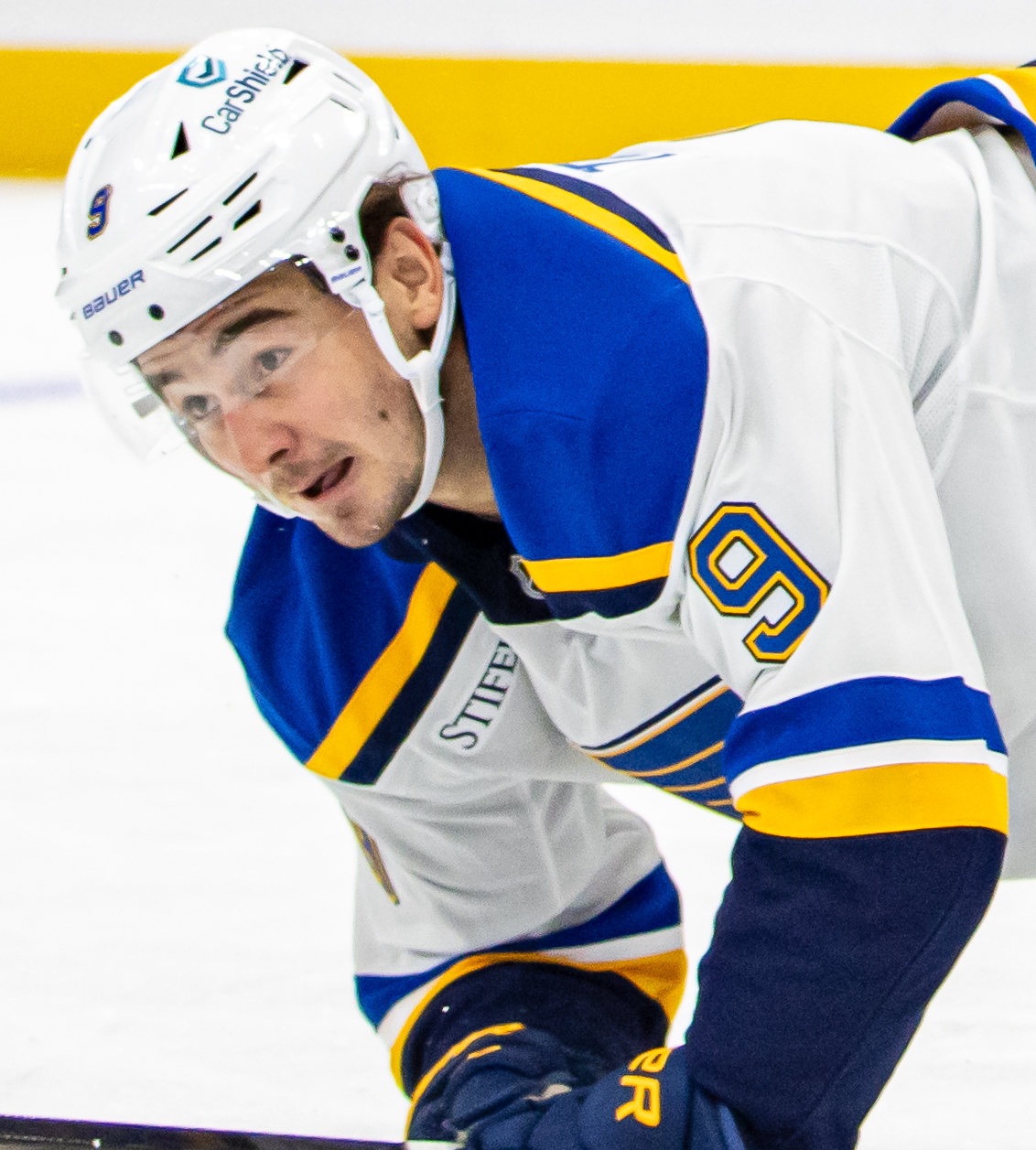
Alexandre Texier is the fourth highest French-born point scorer, and the highest active player.

Rank	Name	Team(s)	GP	Pts	P/GP
1	Paul MacLean	STL, WIN, DET	719	673	0.94
2	Antoine Roussel	DAL, VAN, ARI	607	197	0.32
3	Pierre-Édouard Bellemare	PHI, VGK, COL, TBL, SEA	699	138	0.20
4	**Alexandre Texier**	CBJ, STL, MTL	283	111	0.39
5	Philippe Bozon	STL	144	41	0.28
6	Xavier Ouellet	DET, MTL	178	28	0.16
7	Yohann Auvitu	NJD, EDM	58	13	0.22
8	Stéphane Da Costa	OTT	47	11	0.23
9	**Benoit-Olivier Groulx**	ANA, TOR	78	10	0.13
10	Kalle Kossila	ANA	19	3	0.16

=== Germany ===
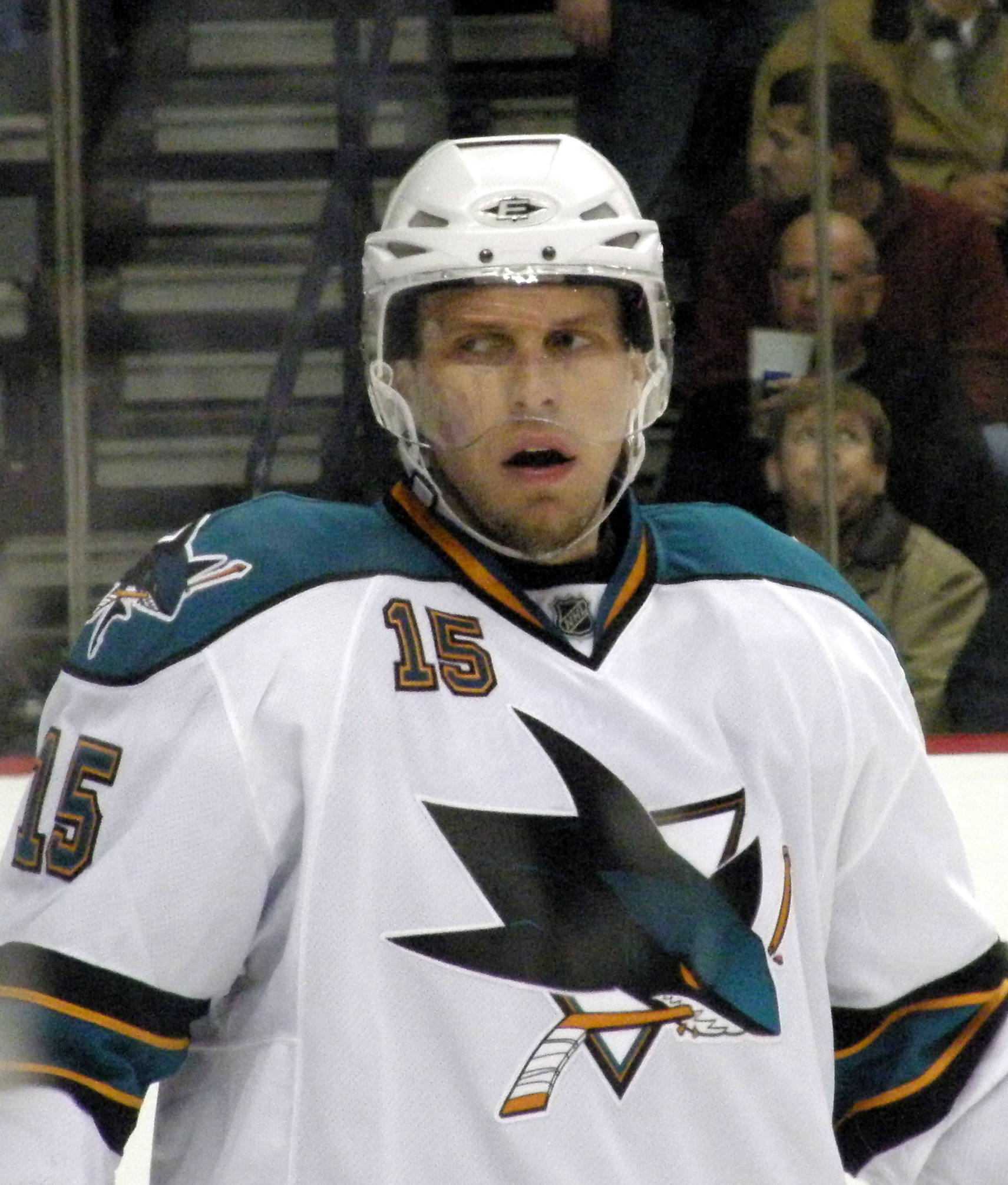
Dany Heatley is the second highest point scorer born in Germany, although he played internationally for Canada.

Rank	Name	Team(s)	GP	Pts	P/GP
1	**Leon Draisaitl**	EDM	855	1,053	1.23
2	Dany Heatley	ATL, OTT, SJS, MIN, ANA	869	791	0.91
3	Walt Tkaczuk	NYR	945	678	0.72
4	Marco Sturm	SJS, BOS, LAK, WSH, VAN, FLA	938	487	0.52
5	Jochen Hecht	STL, EDM, BUF	833	463	0.56
6	**Tim Stützle**	OTT	447	409	0.91
7	Christian Ehrhoff	SJS, VAN, BUF, PIT, LAK, CHI	789	339	0.43
8	Willie Huber	DET, NYR, VAN, PHI	655	321	0.49
9	Mikhail Grabovski	MTL, TOR, WSH, NYI	534	296	0.55
10	Uwe Krupp	BUF, NYI, QUE/COL, DET, ATL	729	281	0.39

=== Haiti ===
Rank	Name	Team(s)	GP	Pts	P/GP
1	Claude Vilgrain	VAN, NJD, PHI	89	53	0.60

=== Indonesia ===
Rank	Name	Team(s)	GP	Pts	P/GP
1	Richie Regehr	CGY	20	4	0.20

=== Italy ===
Rank	Name	Team(s)	GP	Pts	P/GP
1	Luca Sbisa	PHI, ANA, VAN, VGK, NYI, WPG, NSH	549	113	0.21
2	Nelson Debenedet	DET, PIT	46	14	0.30

=== Jamaica ===
Rank	Name	Team(s)	GP	Pts	P/GP
1	Graeme Townshend	BOS, NYI, OTT	45	10	0.22

=== Japan ===
Rank	Name	Team(s)	GP	Pts	P/GP
1	Ryan O'Marra	EDM, ANA	33	7	0.21

=== Kazakhstan ===
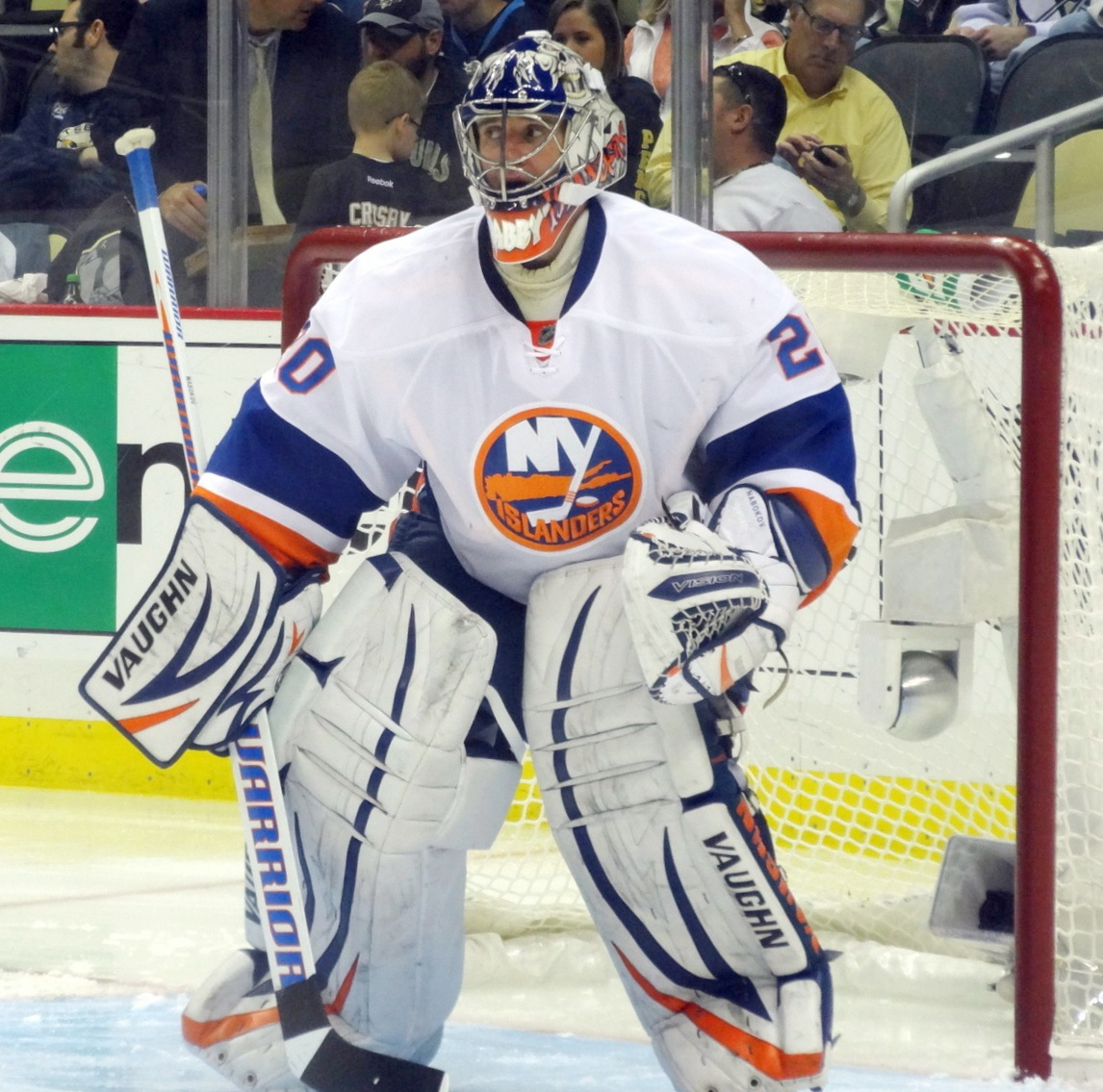
Evgeni Nabokov, a goaltender, is the fourth all-time leading point scorer from Kazakhstan. Although he played internationally for Russia, he started his junior career in Kazakhstan. One of his points comes from a goal scored during the 2001–02 season.

Rank	Name	Team(s)	GP	Pts	P/GP
1	Nik Antropov	TOR, NYR, ATL/WPG	788	465	0.59
2	Alexander Perezhogin	MTL	128	34	0.27
3	Pavel Vorobyev	CHI	57	25	0.44
4	Evgeni Nabokov	SJS, NYI, TBL	697	15	0.02
5	Viktor Antipin	BUF	47	10	0.21
6	Maxim Kuznetsov	DET, LAK	136	10	0.07
7	Anton Khudobin	MIN, BOS, CAR, ANA, DAL, CHI	260	8	0.03
8	Konstantin Pushkarev	LAK	17	5	0.29
9	Konstantin Shafranov	STL	5	3	0.60
10	Vitali Kolesnik	COL	8	1	0.13

=== Latvia ===
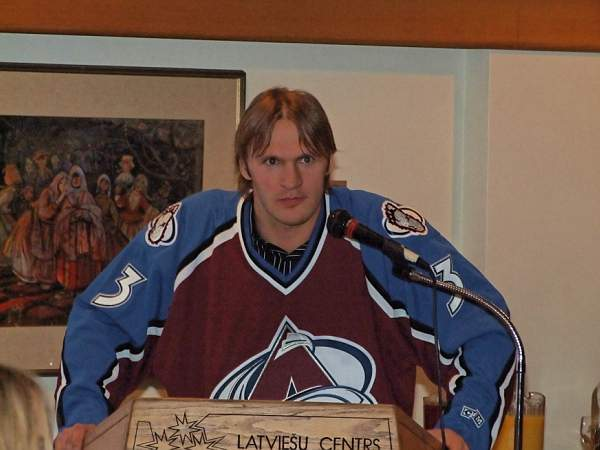
Kārlis Skrastiņš is Latvia's fifth all-time leading point scorer.

Rank	Name	Team(s)	GP	Pts	P/GP
1	Sandis Ozoliņš	SJS, COL, CAR, FLA, ANA, NYR	875	564	0.64
2	Sergei Zholtok	BOS, OTT, MTL, EDM, MIN, NSH	588	258	0.44
3	**Zemgus Girgensons**	BUF, TBL	844	214	0.25
4	**Teddy Blueger**	PIT, VGK, VAN	453	169	0.37
5	Kārlis Skrastiņš	NSH, COL, FLA, DAL	832	136	0.16
6	Rūdolfs Balcers	OTT, SJS, FLA, TBL	170	62	0.36
7	**Uvis Balinskis**	FLA	156	36	0.23
8	Viktor Tikhonov	PHX/ARI, CHI	111	22	0.20
9	Raitis Ivanāns	MTL, LAK, CGY	282	18	0.06
10	Herberts Vasiļjevs	FLA, ATL, VAN	51	15	0.29

=== Lebanon ===
Rank	Name	Team(s)	GP	Pts	P/GP
1	Ed Hatoum	DET, VAN	47	9	0.19

=== Lithuania ===
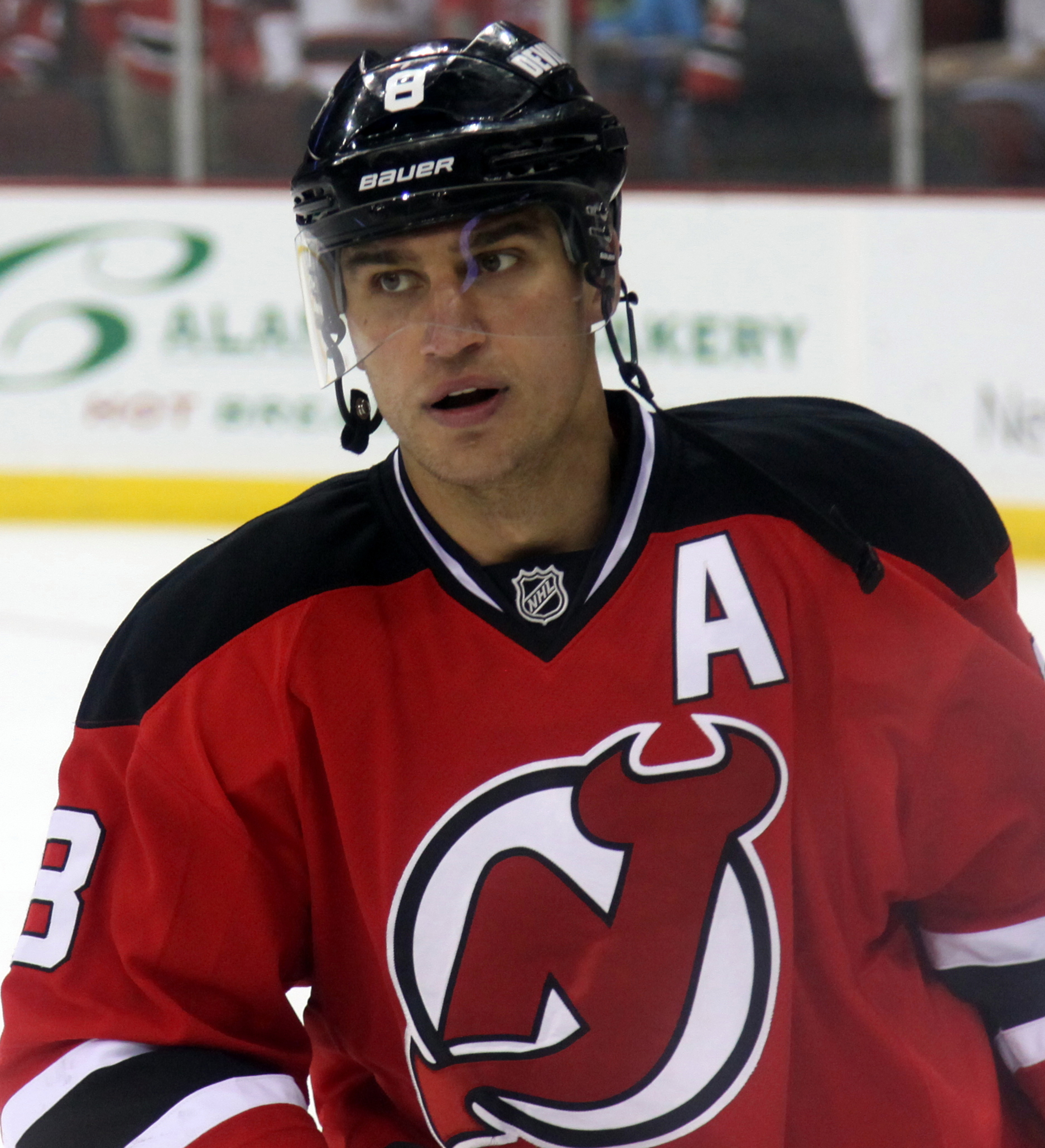
Dainius Zubrus is the all-time leading point scorer from Lithuania.

Rank	Name	Team(s)	GP	Pts	P/GP
1	Dainius Zubrus	PHI, MTL, WSH, BUF, NJD, SJS	1,293	591	0.46
2	Darius Kasparaitis	NYI, PIT, COL, NYR	863	163	0.19

=== Netherlands ===
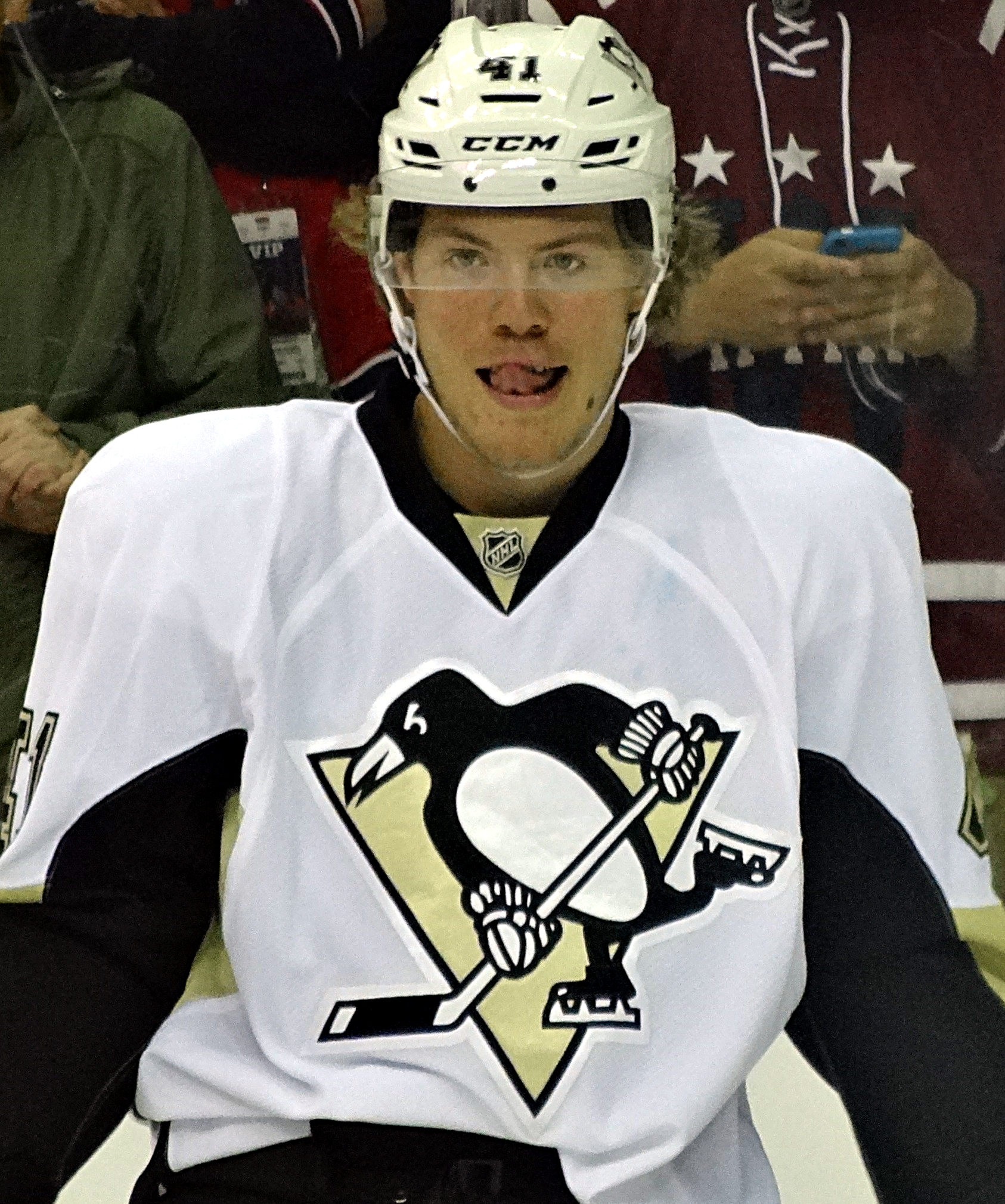
Daniel Sprong is the third Dutch-born player to play in the NHL, and the first one selected in the NHL Entry Draft.

Rank	Name	Team(s)	GP	Pts	P/GP
1	Ed Beers	CGY, STL	250	210	0.84
2	Ed Kea	AFM, STL	583	175	0.30
3	Daniel Sprong	PIT, ANA, WSH, SEA, DET, VAN, NJD	374	166	0.44

=== Nigeria ===
Rank	Name	Team(s)	GP	Pts	P/GP
1	Rumun Ndur	BUF, NYR, ATL	69	5	0.07
2	Akim Aliu	CGY	7	3	0.43

=== Norway ===
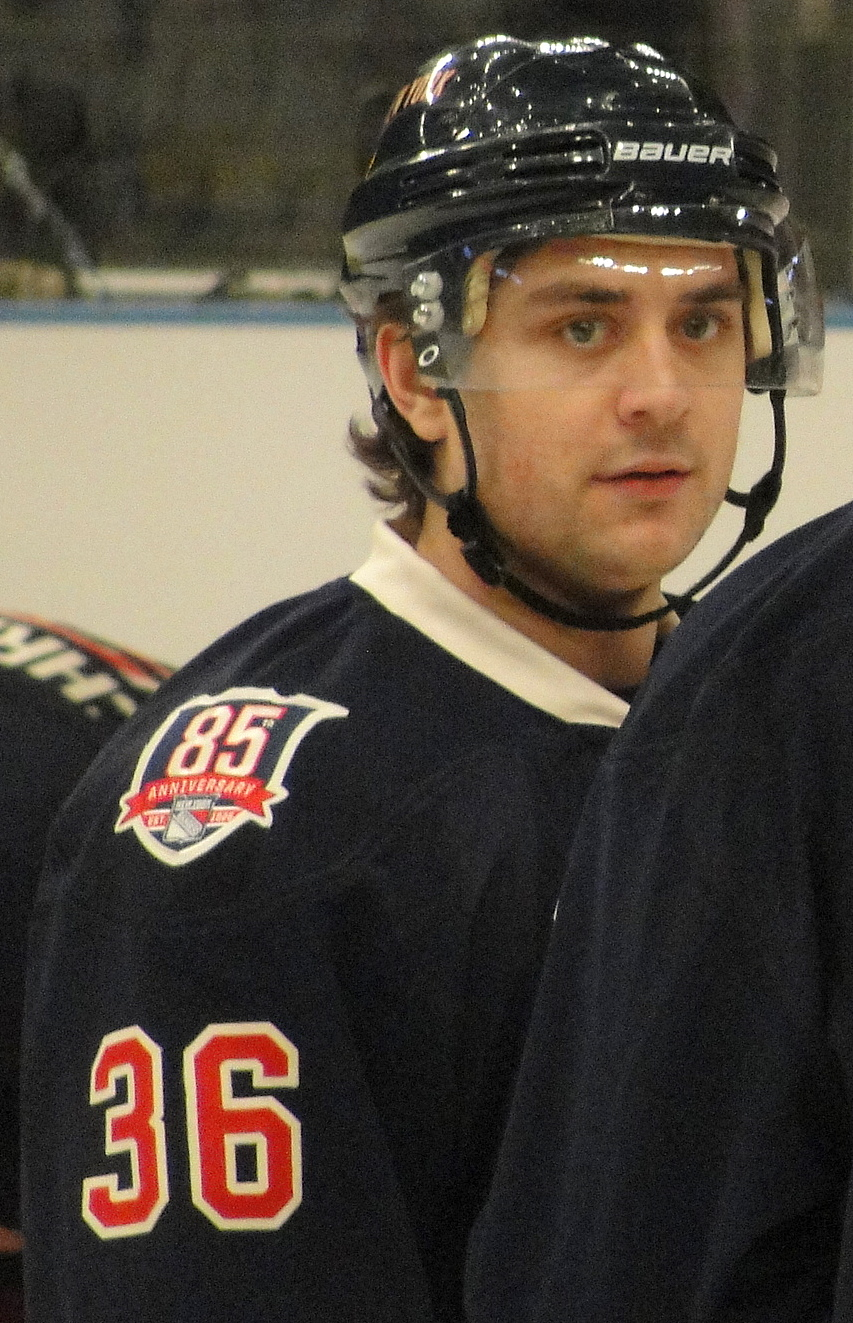
Mats Zuccarello is Norway's all-time leading point scorer.

Rank	Name	Team(s)	GP	Pts	P/GP
1	**Mats Zuccarello**	NYR, DAL, MIN	963	744	0.77
2	Espen Knutsen	ANA, CBJ	207	111	0.54
3	**Emil Lilleberg**	TBL	163	36	0.22
4	Patrick Thoresen	EDM, PHI	106	24	0.23
5	Andreas Martinsen	COL, MTL, CHI	152	23	0.15
6	Ole-Kristian Tollefsen	CBJ, PHI, DET	163	12	0.07
7	Jonas Holøs	COL	39	6	0.15
8	Anders Myrvold	COL, BOS, NYI, DET	33	5	0.15
9	**Michael Brandsegg-Nygard**	DET	14	1	0.07

=== Paraguay ===
Rank	Name	Team(s)	GP	Pts	P/GP
1	Willi Plett	AFM/CGY, MNS, BOS	834	437	0.52

=== Poland ===
Rank	Name	Team(s)	GP	Pts	P/GP
1	Mariusz Czerkawski	BOS, EDM, NYI, MTL, TOR	745	435	0.58
2	Wojtek Wolski	COL, PHX, NYR, FLA, WSH	451	267	0.59
3	Nick Harbaruk	PIT, STL	364	120	0.33
4	Joe Jerwa	NYR, BOS, NYA	234	87	0.37
5	Krzysztof Oliwa	NJD, CBJ, PIT, NYR, BOS, CGY	410	45	0.11
6	Peter Sidorkiewicz	HFD, OTT, NJD	246	9	0.04
7	Edward Leier	CHI	16	3	0.19

=== Russia ===
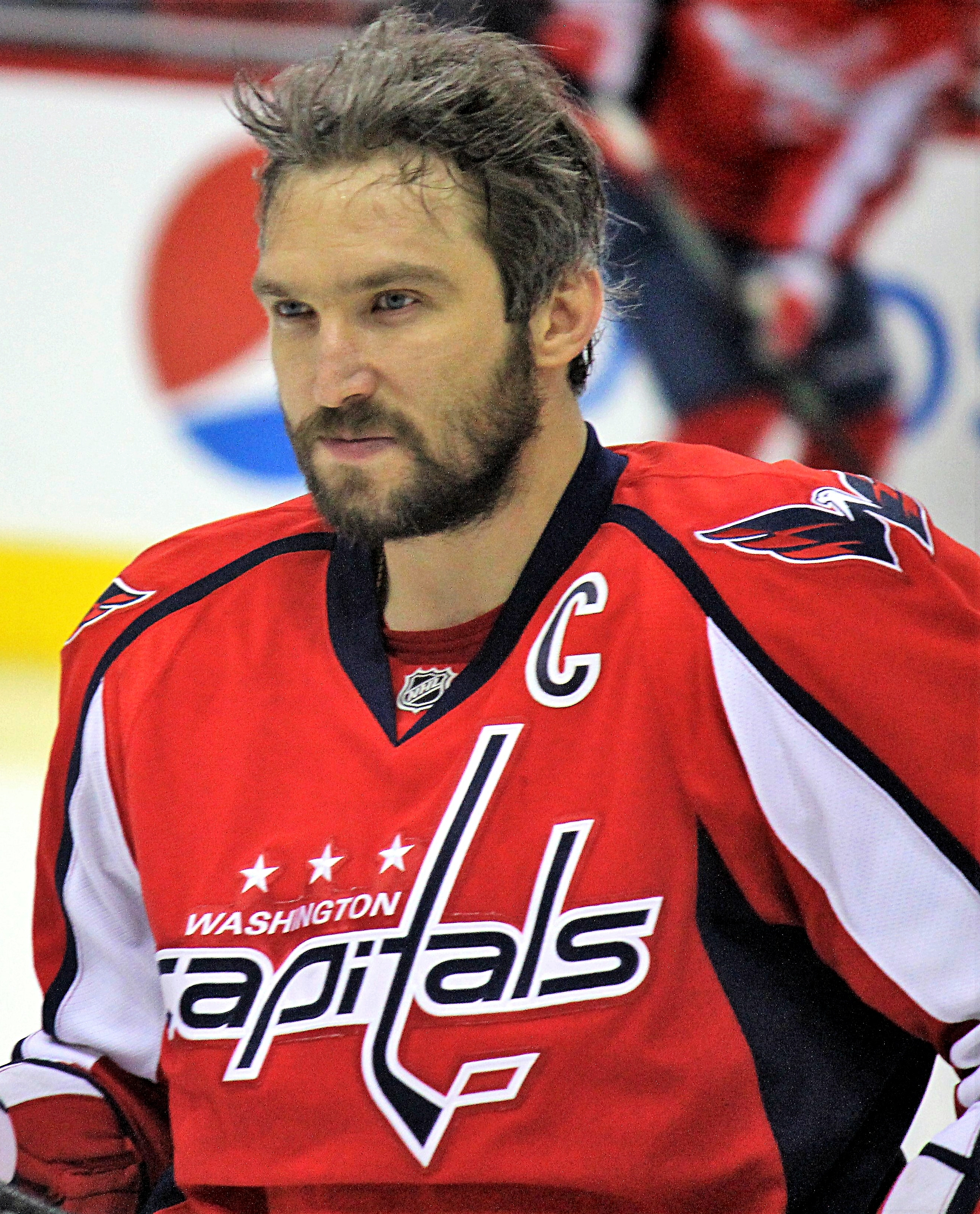
Alexander Ovechkin is Russia's all-time leading point scorer.

Rank	Name	Team(s)	GP	Pts	P/GP
1	**Alexander Ovechkin**	WSH	1,573	1,687	1.07
2	**Evgeni Malkin**	PIT	1,269	1,407	1.11
3	Sergei Fedorov	DET, ANA, CBJ, WSH	1,248	1,179	0.94
4	**Nikita Kucherov**	TBL	879	1,124	1.28
5	Alexander Mogilny	BUF, VAN, NJD, TOR	990	1,032	1.04
6	Alexei Kovalev	NYR, PIT, MTL, OTT, FLA	1,316	1,029	0.78
7	**Artemi Panarin**	CHI, CBJ, NYR, LAK	830	954	1.15
8	Pavel Datsyuk	DET	953	918	0.96
9	Ilya Kovalchuk	ATL, NJD, LAK, MTL, WSH	926	876	0.95
10	Vyacheslav Kozlov	DET, BUF, ATL	1,182	853	0.72

=== Serbia ===
Rank	Name	Team(s)	GP	Pts	P/GP
1	Ivan Boldirev	BOS, CGS, CHI, AFM, VAN, DET	1,052	866	0.82
2	Stan Smrke	MTL	9	3	0.33

=== Slovakia ===
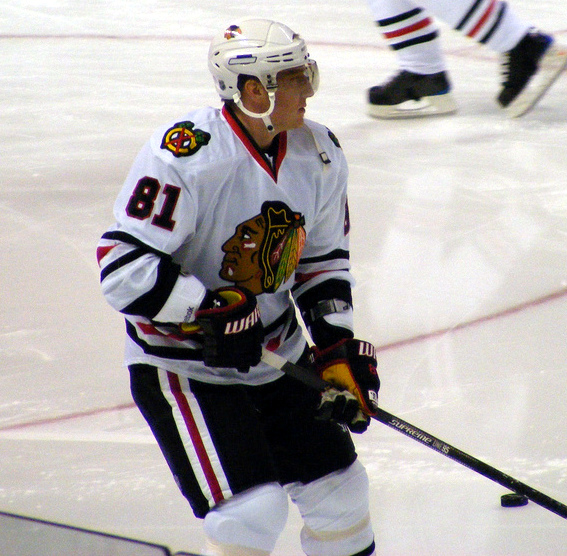
Marián Hossa is the third highest Slovak point scorer.

Rank	Name	Team(s)	GP	Pts	P/GP
1	Stan Mikita	CHI	1,394	1,467	1.05
2	Peter Šťastný	QUE, NJD, STL	977	1,239	1.27
3	Marián Hossa	OTT, ATL, PIT, DET, CHI	1,309	1,134	0.87
4	Marián Gáborík	MIN, NYR, CBJ, LAK, OTT	1,035	815	0.79
5	Pavol Demitra	OTT, STL, LAK, MIN, VAN	847	768	0.91
6	Miroslav Šatan	EDM, BUF, NYI, PIT, BOS	1,050	735	0.70
7	Žigmund Pálffy	NYI, LAK, PIT	684	713	1.04
8	Zdeno Chára	NYI, OTT, BOS, WSH	1,680	680	0.40
9	Jozef Stümpel	BOS, LAK, FLA	957	677	0.71
10	Anton Šťastný	QUE	650	636	0.98

=== Slovenia ===
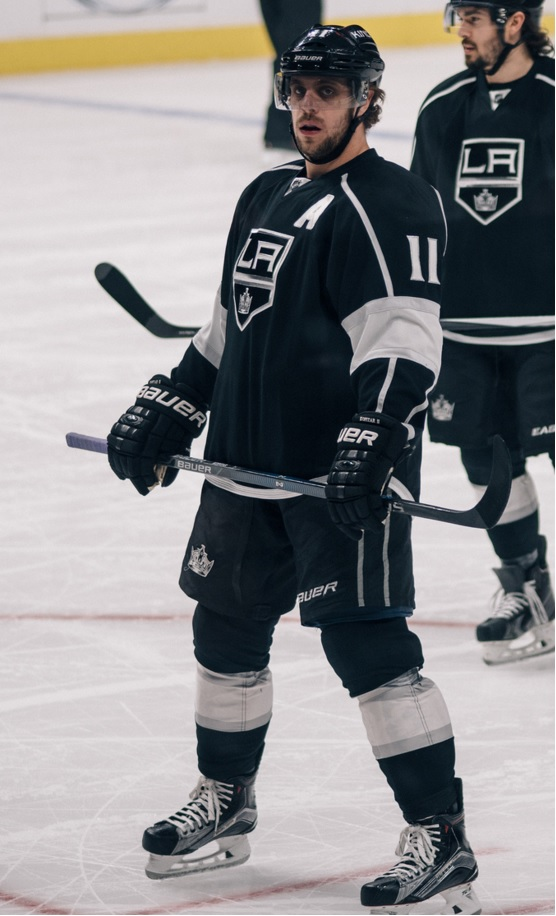
Anze Kopitar is the first Slovenian to play in the NHL.

Rank	Name	Team(s)	GP	Pts	P/GP
1	Anže Kopitar	LAK	1,521	1,316	0.87
2	Jan Muršak	DET	46	4	0.09

=== South Africa ===
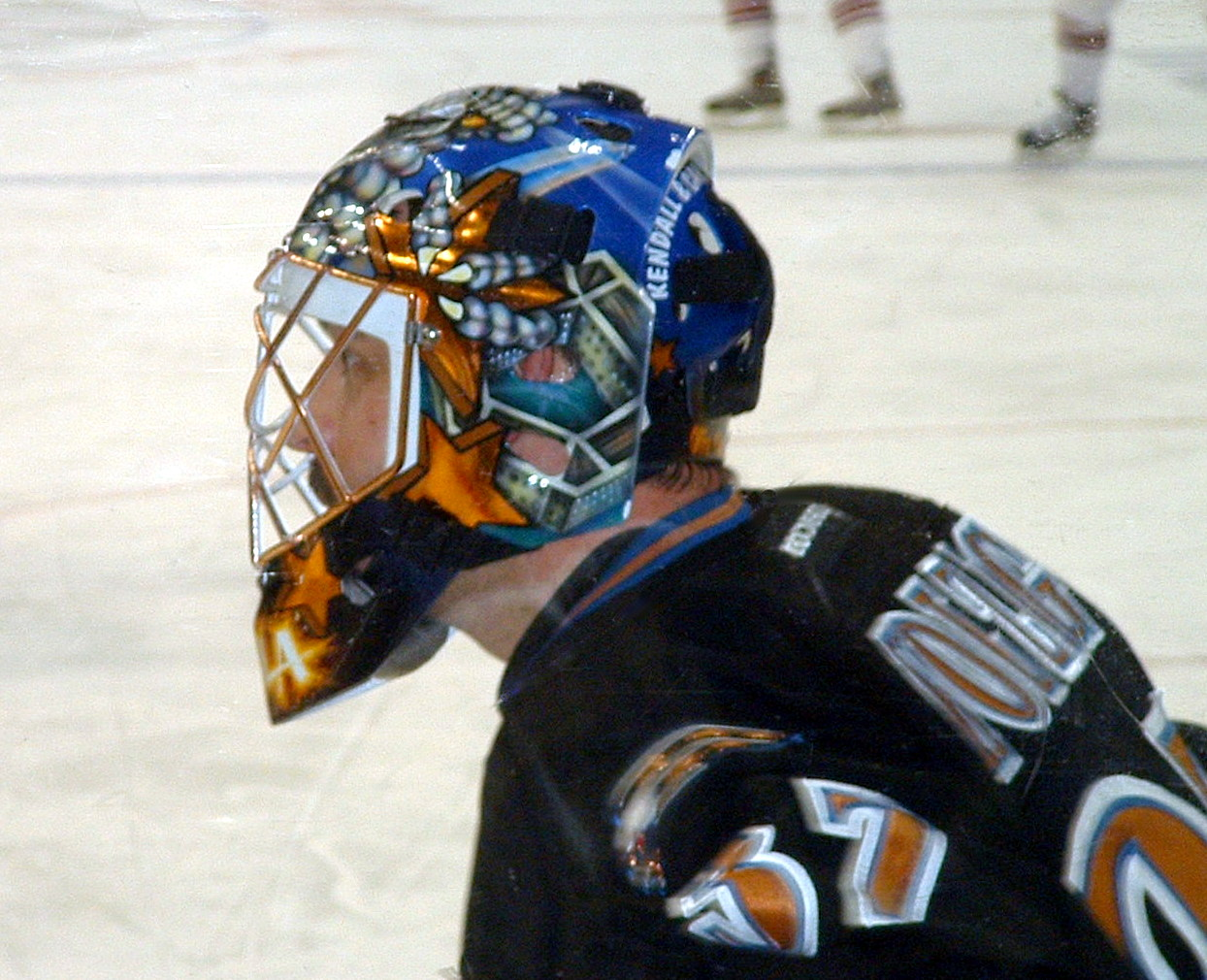
Olaf Kolzig was the first player born in South Africa to have played in the NHL, although he represented Germany in international competition.

Rank	Name	Team(s)	GP	Pts	P/GP
1	Olaf Kölzig	WSH, TBL	719	17	0.02

=== South Korea ===
Rank	Name	Team(s)	GP	Pts	P/GP
1	Richard Park	PIT, ANA, PHI, MIN, VAN, NYI	738	241	0.33
2	Jim Paek	PIT, LAK, OTT	217	34	0.16

=== Sweden ===
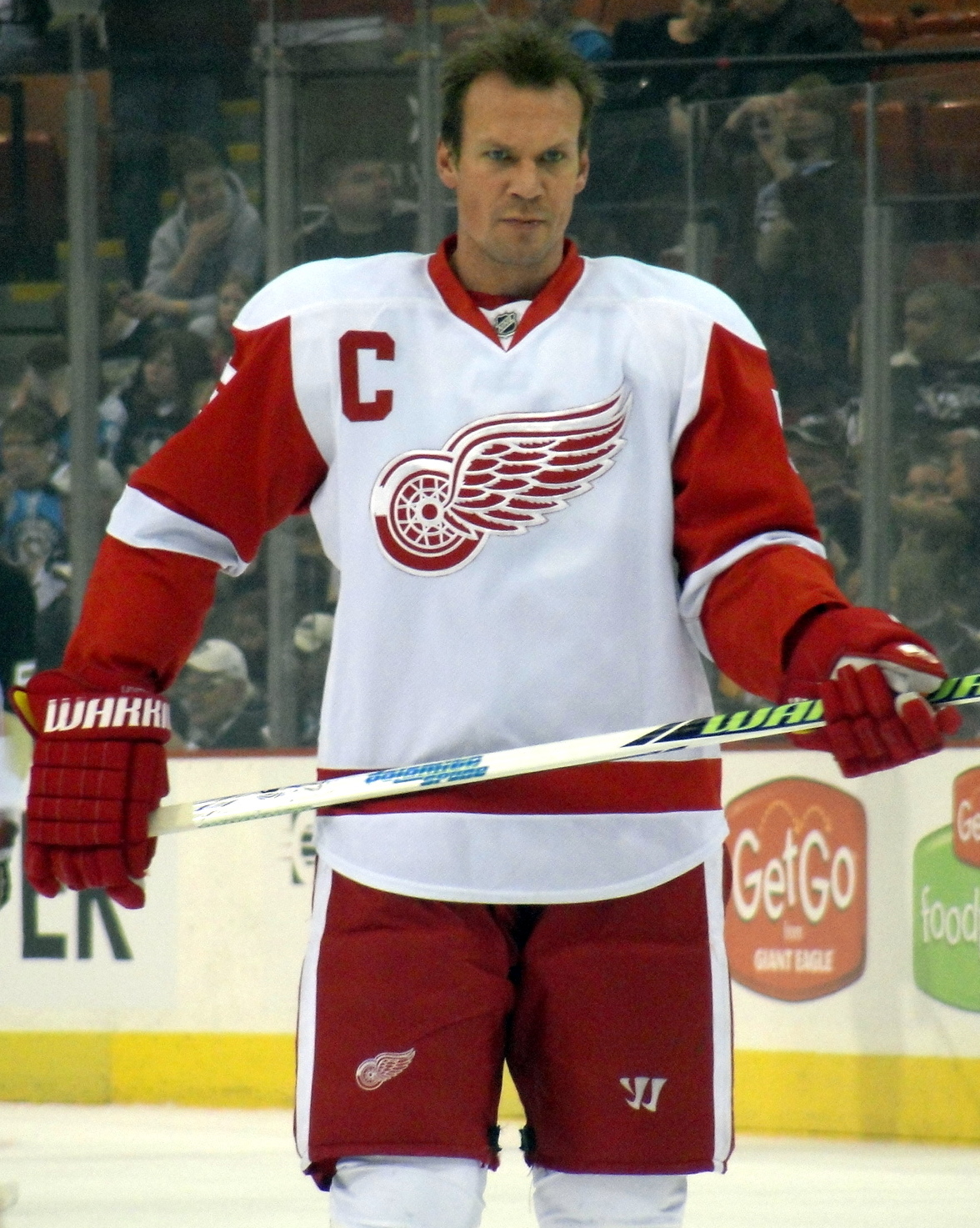
Nicklas Lidström is Sweden's third all-time leading point scorer.

Rank	Name	Team(s)	GP	Pts	P/GP
1	Mats Sundin	QUE, TOR, VAN	1,346	1,349	1.00
2	Daniel Alfredsson	OTT, DET	1,246	1,157	0.93
3	Nicklas Lidström	DET	1,564	1,142	0.73
4	Henrik Sedin	VAN	1,330	1,070	0.80
5	Daniel Sedin	VAN	1,306	1,041	0.80
6	Nicklas Bäckström	WSH	1,105	1,033	0.93
7	Henrik Zetterberg	DET	1,082	960	0.89
8	**Erik Karlsson**	OTT, SJS, PIT	1,159	936	0.81
9	Peter Forsberg	QUE/COL, PHI, NSH	708	885	1.25
10	Markus Näslund	PIT, VAN, NYR	1,117	869	0.78

=== Switzerland ===
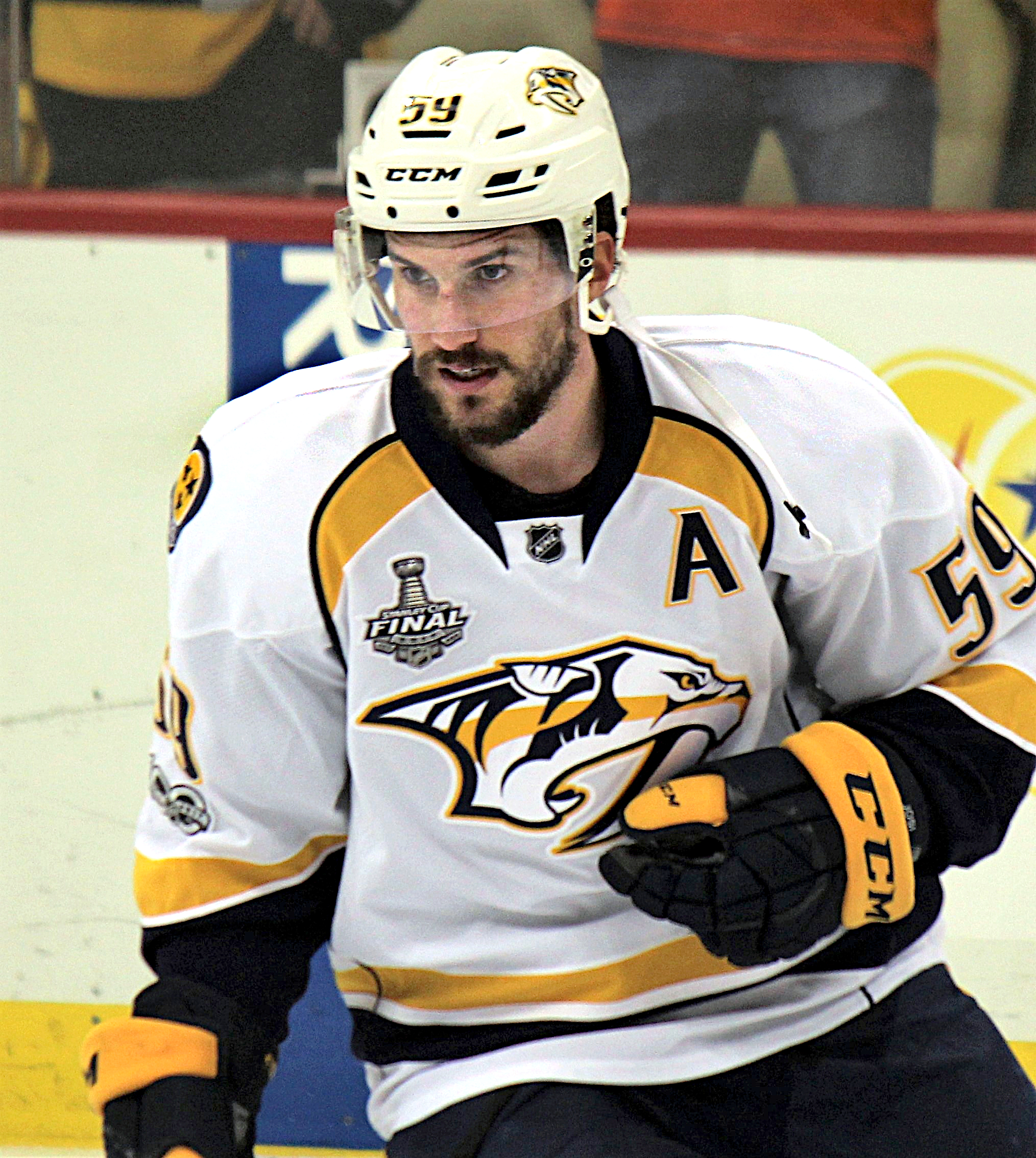
Roman Josi is the all-time leading point scorer from Switzerland.

Rank	Name	Team(s)	GP	Pts	P/GP
1	**Roman Josi**	NSH	1,030	779	0.76
2	**Kevin Fiala**	NSH, MIN, LAK	707	528	0.75
3	**Nino Niederreiter**	NYI, MIN, CAR, NSH, WPG	1,030	499	0.48
4	**Nico Hischier**	NJD	609	488	0.80
5	**Timo Meier**	SJS, NJD	698	479	0.69
6	Mark Streit	MTL, NYI, PHI, PIT	786	434	0.55
7	Mark Hardy	LAK, NYR, MNS	926	368	0.40
8	**Pius Suter**	CHI, DET, VAN, STL	428	191	0.45
9	**Mason McTavish**	ANA	304	181	0.60
10	Sven Bärtschi	CGY, VAN, VGK	292	138	0.47

=== Taiwan ===
Rank	Name	Team(s)	GP	Pts	P/GP
1	Rod Langway	MTL, WSH	994	329	0.33

=== Tanzania ===
Rank	Name	Team(s)	GP	Pts	P/GP
1	Chris Nielsen	CBJ	52	14	0.27

=== Ukraine ===
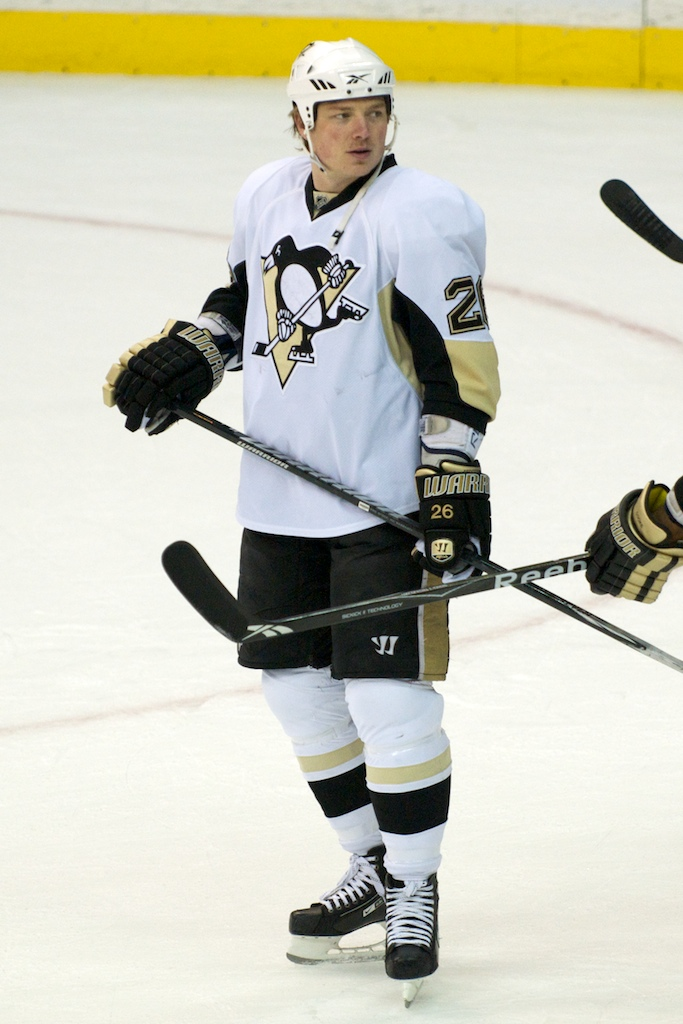
Ruslan Fedotenko is the fifth all-time leading scorer from Ukraine.

Rank	Name	Team(s)	GP	Pts	P/GP
1	Peter Bondra	WSH, OTT, ATL, CHI	1,081	892	0.83
2	Dmitri Khristich	WSH, LAK, BOS, TOR, WSH	811	596	0.73
3	Alexei Zhitnik	LAK, BUF, NYI, PHI, ATL	1,085	471	0.43
4	Johnny Gottselig	CHI	589	371	0.63
5	Ruslan Fedotenko	PHI, TBL, NYI, PIT, NYR	863	366	0.42
6	Alexei Ponikarovsky	TOR, PIT, LAK, CAR, NJD, WPG	678	323	0.48
7	Oleg Tverdovsky	ANA, WIN/PHX, NJD, CAR, LAK	713	317	0.44
8	Nikolai Zherdev	CBJ, NYR, PHI	421	261	0.62
9	Anton Babchuk	CHI, CAR, CGY	289	107	0.37
10	Vitaly Vishnevskiy	ANA, ATL, NSH, NJD	552	68	0.12

=== United Kingdom ===
Rank	Name	Team(s)	GP	Pts	P/GP
1	Steve Thomas	TOR, CHI, NYI, NJD, ANA, DET	1,235	933	0.76
2	Owen Nolan	QUE/COL, SJS, TOR, PHX, CGY, MIN	1,200	885	0.74
3	Ken Hodge	CHI, BOS, NYR	881	800	0.91
4	Steve Smith	EDM, CHI, CGY	804	375	0.47
5	Peter Lee	PIT	431	245	0.57
6	Jim McFadden	DET, CHI	412	226	0.55
7	Adam Brown	DET, CHI, BOS	391	217	0.55
8	Jim Conacher	DET, CHI, NYR	328	202	0.62
9	Tommy Anderson	DET, NYA	319	189	0.59
10	Red Beattie	BOS, DET, NYA	334	147	0.44

=== United States ===
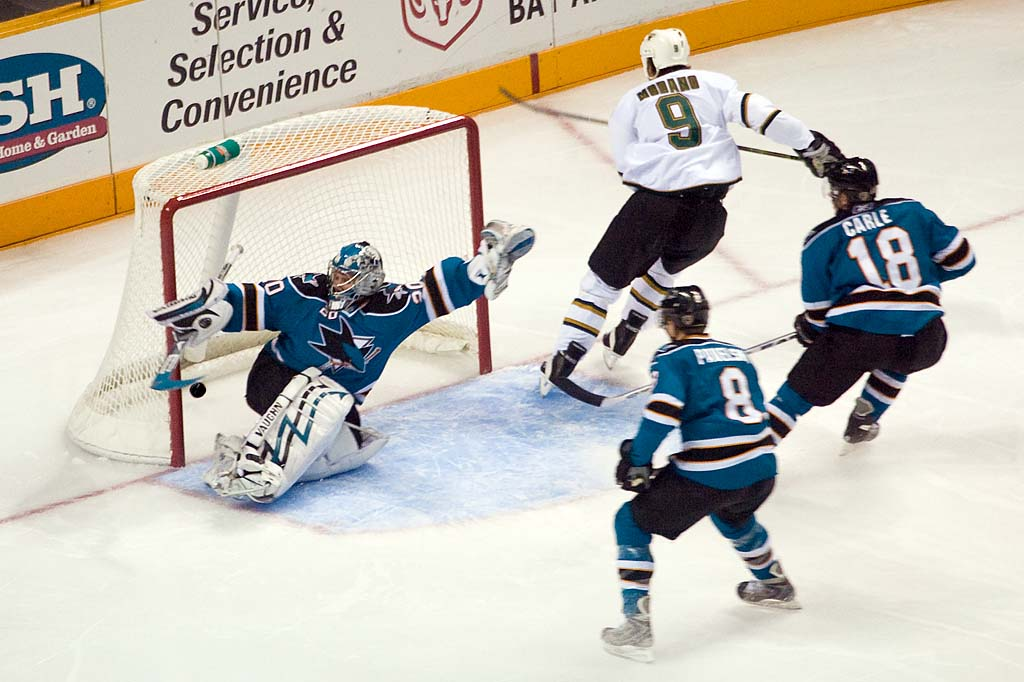
Mike Modano—the second highest U.S. point scorer—is seen here scoring the goal that put him ahead of Phil Housley.

Rank	Name	Team(s)	GP	Pts	P/GP
1	**Patrick Kane**	CHI, NYR, DET	1,369	1,400	1.02
2	Mike Modano	MNS/DAL, DET	1,499	1,374	0.92
3	Phil Housley	BUF, WIN, STL, CGY, NJD, WSH, CHI, TOR	1,495	1,232	0.82
4	Jeremy Roenick	CHI, PHX, PHI, LAK, SJS	1,363	1,216	0.89
5	Joe Pavelski	SJS, DAL	1,332	1,068	0.80
6	Keith Tkachuk	WIN/PHX, STL, ATL	1,201	1,065	0.89
7	Joe Mullen	STL, CGY, PIT, BOS	1,062	1,063	1.00
8	Doug Weight	NYR, EDM, STL, CAR, ANA, NYI	1,238	1,033	0.83
9	Brian Leetch	NYR, TOR, BOS	1,205	1,028	0.85
10	Pat LaFontaine	NYI, BUF, NYR	865	1,013	1.17

=== Uzbekistan ===
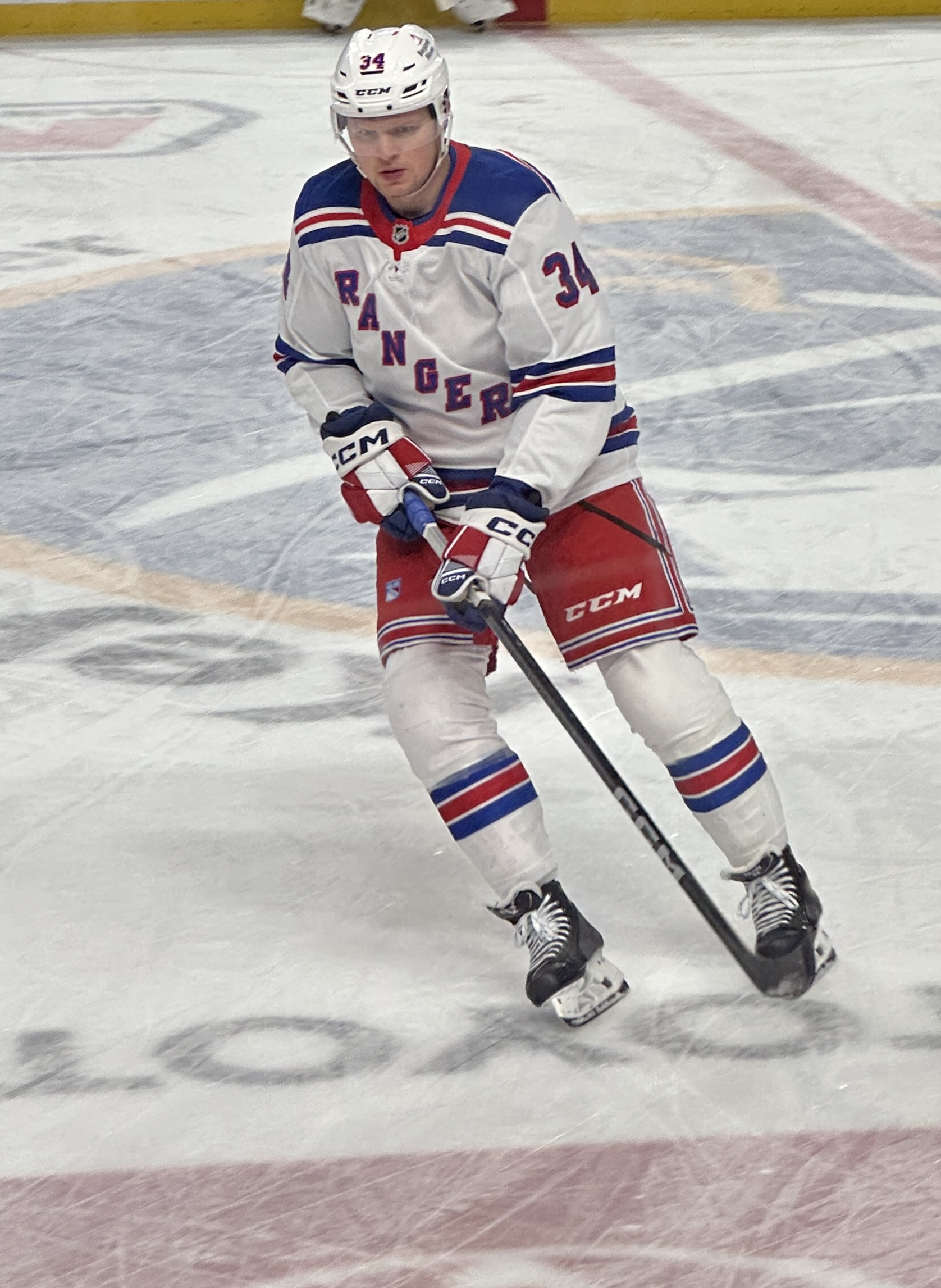
Arthur Kaliyev is the leading scorer from players born in Uzbekistan. He moved to the United States as a child and represents them in international competition.

Rank	Name	Team(s)	GP	Pts	P/GP
1	**Arthur Kaliyev**	LAK, NYR, OTT	204	76	0.37
2	Maxim Mayorov	CBJ	22	3	0.14

=== Venezuela ===
Rank	Name	Team(s)	GP	Pts	P/GP
1	Rick Chartraw	MTL, LAK, NYR, EDM	420	92	0.22
2	Don Spring	WIN	259	55	0.21

== Notes ==
- Almost all players on this list from Russia, Ukraine, Latvia, Lithuania, Kazakhstan, and Belarus were born in the Soviet Union – in the Russian SFSR, Ukrainian SSR, Latvian SSR, Lithuanian SSR, Kazakh SSR, and Byelorussian SSR respectively. The Soviet Union officially dissolved at the end of 1991. Many of these players have represented both the Soviet Union and their respective nation in international competitions.
- Almost all players on this list from the Czech Republic or Slovakia were born in Czechoslovakia. Czechoslovakia officially dissolved at the end of 1992. Many of these players have represented both Czechoslovakia and their respective nation in international competitions.
- Almost every player on this list from Germany was born in West Germany. The exceptions are Mikhail Grabovski, born in East Germany, and Walt Tkaczuk, born shortly after World War II in the portion of Allied-occupied Germany that became West Germany in 1949. West Germany and East Germany reunited in 1990. Some of these players have represented both West Germany and Germany in international competitions.

== See also ==
- List of NHL statistical leaders
