= Jonas Holøs =

Norwegian ice hockey player (born 1987)

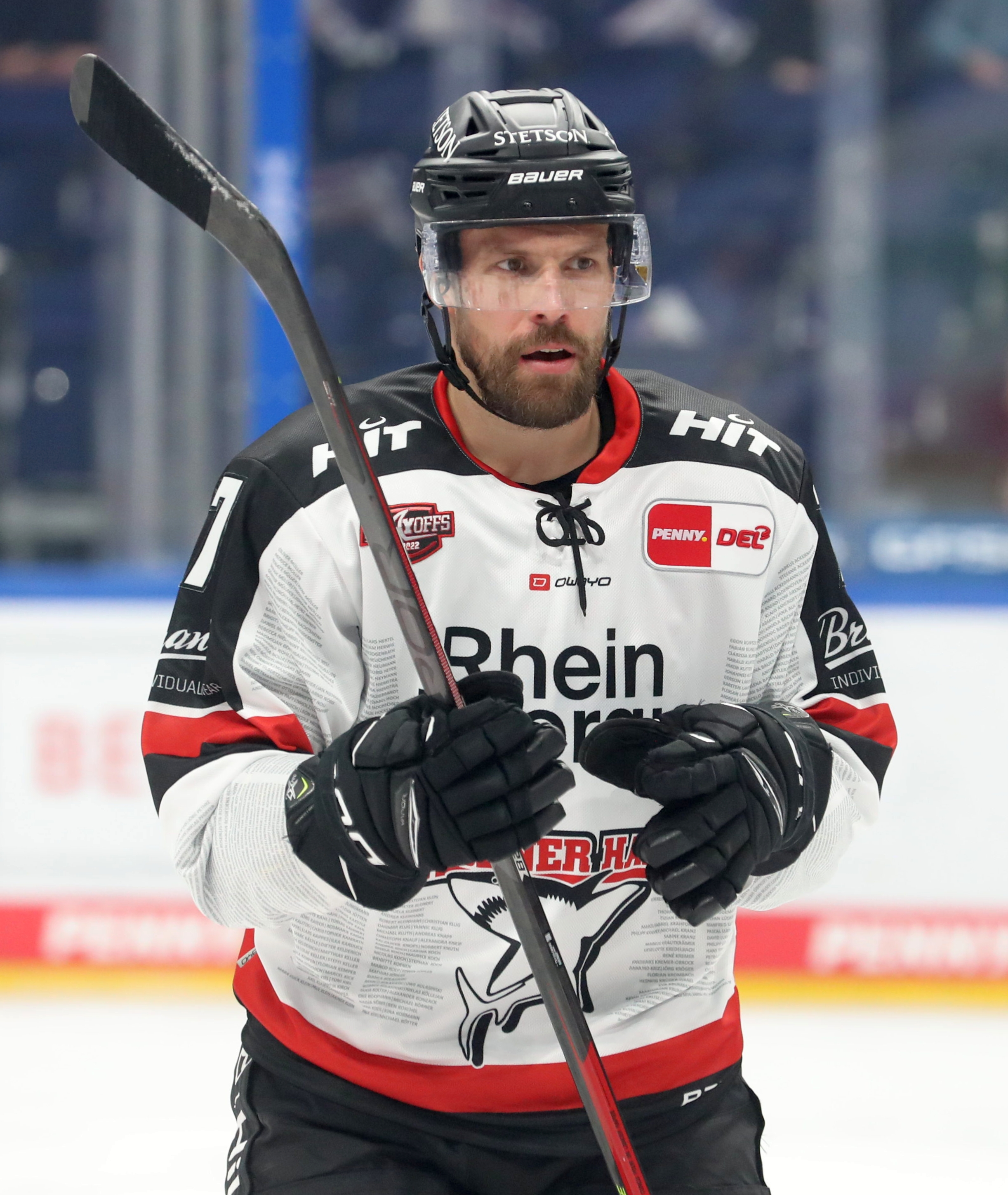
- Born: 27 August 1987 (age 38) Sarpsborg, Norway
- Height: 5 ft 11 in (180 cm)
- Weight: 205 lb (93 kg; 14 st 9 lb)
- Position: Defence
- Shot: Right
- Played for: Sparta Sarpsborg; Färjestad BK; Colorado Avalanche; Växjö Lakers; Lokomotiv Yaroslavl; HC Fribourg-Gottéron; Linköping HC; Kölner Haie
- National team: Norway
- NHL draft: 170th overall, 2008; Colorado Avalanche
- Playing career: 2004–2023

Jonas Holøs (born August 27, 1987) is a Norwegian former professional ice hockey defenseman who played in the National Hockey League (NHL) and participated in the 2010 and 2014 Winter Olympics as a member of Team Norway.

== Playing career ==
Holøs began playing for hometown Norwegian team Sparta Warriors of the GET-ligaen in 2002, but after the 2007–08 season he signed with Färjestads BK of the Swedish Elitserien.

After the 2008 IIHF World Championship in Canada, he was invited to a summer camp with the Chicago Blackhawks. But on 21 June 2008, he was drafted by the Colorado Avalanche of the National Hockey League in the sixth round as the 170th overall pick. Returning to Sweden Holøs played in 55 games and recorded 8 goals for 16 points. Färjestad's General Manager, Thomas Rundqvist, stated before the 2009 Playoff finals that Holøs was the player who had evolved the most in the 2008–09 season, and that the Avalanche wanted him already in the autumn of 2009. But Holøs stated that he had a two-year contract with Färjestad, which he intended to fulfill. After finishing the 2009–10 season with 14 points for Färjestads he left the Elitserien and signed with the Colorado Avalanche to a two-year entry-level contract on May 26, 2010.

In the 2010–11 season, he made the Avalanche opening night roster out training camp. Holøs made his NHL-debut on October 16, 2010, against the New York Islanders leading all players in time on ice with 23:57 in his first game. He became the sixth Norwegian, following Bjørn Skaare, Anders Myrvold, Espen Knutsen, Ole-Kristian Tollefsen and Patrick Thoresen to play in the NHL. In his fourth game he set a new individual NHL-game record amongst Norwegians by logging a total of 27 minutes and 22 seconds of time on ice. On November 21, 2010, he was sent down to the Colorado's AHL affiliate, the Lake Erie Monsters. On December 19 he was back with the Avalanche, registering his third assist of the season, tying the Norwegian record of most assists in one season by a defenceman.

After failing to take a spot in the Avalanche's team for the 2011–12 season, Holøs asked for his release from the Avalanche organization on October 14, 2011, to move back to Europe. Two days later he was reassigned by the Colorado Avalanche to a two-year deal (expiring after the 2012–13 season) with the newcomers Växjö Lakers Hockey of the Swedish top-tier league Elitserien (SEL).

Upon completion of the 2012–13 season, his second with the Lakers and producing 17 points in 55 games, Holøs left as a free agent to sign a contract with Lokomotiv Yaroslavl of the Russian KHL on March 14, 2013.

After two seasons in the KHL, Holøs made a third return to the SHL, in signing an optional two-year contract with former club, Färjestads BK on June 16, 2015.

At the completion of his contract with Färjestads, Holøs was not extended by the club and as a free agent, he opted to move to Switzerland in agreeing to a two-year deal with HC Fribourg-Gottéron of the NLA on May 29, 2017.

On 18 June 2019, Holøs having left Switzerland as a free agent opted for a fourth tenure in the SHL, agreeing to a two-year contract with Linköping HC. After completion of his two-year stint with Linköping HC, Holøs moved to Germany, in signing a one-year deal with Kölner Haie of the Deutsche Eishockey Liga (DEL) on 14 June 2021. In the 2021–22 season, he was limited through injury to just 6 regular season games and four playoff appearances for Kölner Haie.

As a free agent, Holøs returned home to Norway and rejoined original club, Sparta Sarpsborg, on a three-year contract on 27 April 2022. Limited to just one playoff game in his first season of his return to Sparta, Holøs opted to conclude his 19 year professional career due to injury on 4 August 2023.

== International play ==
Holøs was first selected to play international hockey for Norway at the junior level in the 2004 World Under-18 IIHF Championships in Belarus. Developing as an allround defenceman Jonas became a fixture on the Norwegian defense, making his full men's international debut at the 2006 World Championships in Latvia, playing in all 6 games.

After playing in 4 consecutive World Championships Holøs was chosen and made his Olympic debut at the 2010 Vancouver Olympics, despite placing last in their group and eliminated by Slovakia in the Qualifying playoffs, Jonas led the entire Tournament for average ice-time per game. At the following 2010 World Championships in Germany, he scored his first full international goal when he opened the scoring in a 12-1 drubbing to Canada on May 14, 2010. Upon completion of the Championships he was again the tournament leader in average ice-time and was named among the Norwegian best in a ninth-place finish.

Following the completion of his first North American season, Holøs joined the national team in Slovakia for the 2011 World Championships. During the round robin, he was named as the best player in a 3-2 victory over Switzerland on May 5, 2011. Holøs led the Norwegian defense with 5 points, second among all tournament defensemen, in helping Norway to a 6th-place finish.

== Career statistics ==
=== Regular season and playoffs ===
			Regular season					Playoffs
Season	Team	League	GP	G	A	Pts	PIM	GP	G	A	Pts	PIM
2002–03	Sparta Warriors	NOR U19	20	1	1	2	0	—	—	—	—	—
2003–04	Sparta Warriors	NOR U19	35	10	7	17	24	—	—	—	—	—
2003–04	Sparta Warriors	NOR	1	0	0	0	0	—	—	—	—	—
2004–05	Sparta Warriors	NOR U19	1	1	1	2	0	—	—	—	—	—
2004–05	Sparta Warriors	NOR	41	3	2	5	18	4	0	0	0	2
2005–06	Sparta Warriors	NOR	26	3	4	7	14	6	0	0	0	0
2006–07	Sparta Warriors	NOR	40	11	19	30	32	13	2	2	4	18
2006–07	Sparta Warriors 2	NOR.2	1	2	0	2	0	—	—	—	—	—
2007–08	Sparta Warriors	NOR	40	2	20	22	67	6	1	0	1	2
2008–09	Färjestad BK	SEL	55	8	8	16	12	13	3	3	6	8
2009–10	Färjestad BK	SEL	51	1	13	14	24	7	0	0	0	2
2010–11	Colorado Avalanche	NHL	39	0	6	6	10	—	—	—	—	—
2010–11	Lake Erie Monsters	AHL	17	0	6	6	8	7	1	1	2	8
2011–12	Växjö Lakers	SEL	41	2	7	9	8	—	—	—	—	—
2012–13	Växjö Lakers	SEL	55	4	13	17	10	—	—	—	—	—
2013–14	Lokomotiv Yaroslavl	KHL	52	6	8	14	12	16	0	4	4	5
2014–15	Lokomotiv Yaroslavl	KHL	60	10	9	19	10	6	0	1	1	2
2015–16	Färjestad BK	SHL	40	5	12	17	6	3	0	0	0	0
2016–17	Färjestad BK	SHL	51	8	9	17	8	7	1	2	3	4
2017–18	HC Fribourg–Gottéron	NL	38	2	12	14	8	2	0	0	0	0
2018–19	HC Fribourg–Gottéron	NL	49	3	14	17	8	—	—	—	—	—
2019–20	Linköping HC	SHL	52	5	13	18	12	—	—	—	—	—
2020–21	Linköping HC	SHL	48	5	4	9	16	—	—	—	—	—
2021–22	Kölner Haie	DEL	6	0	0	0	0	4	1	0	1	2
2022–23	Sparta Sarpsborg	NOR	—	—	—	—	—	1	0	0	0	0
NOR totals			148	19	45	64	131	30	3	2	5	22
SHL totals			393	38	79	117	96	30	4	5	9	14
NHL totals			39	0	6	6	10	—	—	—	—	—

=== International ===
Year	Team	Event	Result	GP	G	A	Pts	PIM
2004	Norway	WJC18	10th	6	0	1	1	2
2005	Norway	WJC D1	1st	5	0	2	2	2
2005	Norway	WJC18 D1	1st	5	3	1	4	14
2006	Norway	WJC	10th	6	0	0	0	12
2006	Norway	WC	11th	6	0	0	0	2
2007	Norway	WJC D1	9th	5	1	1	2	31
2007	Norway	WC	14th	6	0	1	1	6
2008	Norway	WC	8th	7	0	1	1	6
2009	Norway	OGQ	Q	3	1	0	1	2
2009	Norway	WC	11th	6	0	0	0	2
2010	Norway	OG	10th	4	0	1	1	2
2010	Norway	WC	9th	6	1	1	2	8
2011	Norway	WC	6th	7	2	3	5	2
2012	Norway	WC	8th	8	4	5	9	2
2013	Norway	WC	10th	7	0	0	0	4
2014	Norway	OG	12th	4	0	1	1	0
2014	Norway	WC	12th	7	1	1	2	4
2015	Norway	WC	11th	7	1	5	6	0
2016	Norway	WC	10th	7	1	2	3	2
2016	Norway	OGQ	Q	3	2	1	3	2
2017	Norway	WC	11th	7	1	1	2	2
2018	Norway	OG	8th	5	0	1	1	2
2018	Norway	WC	13th	7	1	2	3	2
2019	Norway	WC	12th	7	1	4	5	0
2021	Norway	WC	13th	7	0	1	1	2
Junior totals				27	4	5	9	61
Senior totals				121	16	31	47	52
