= List of Norwegian players selected in the NHL entry draft =

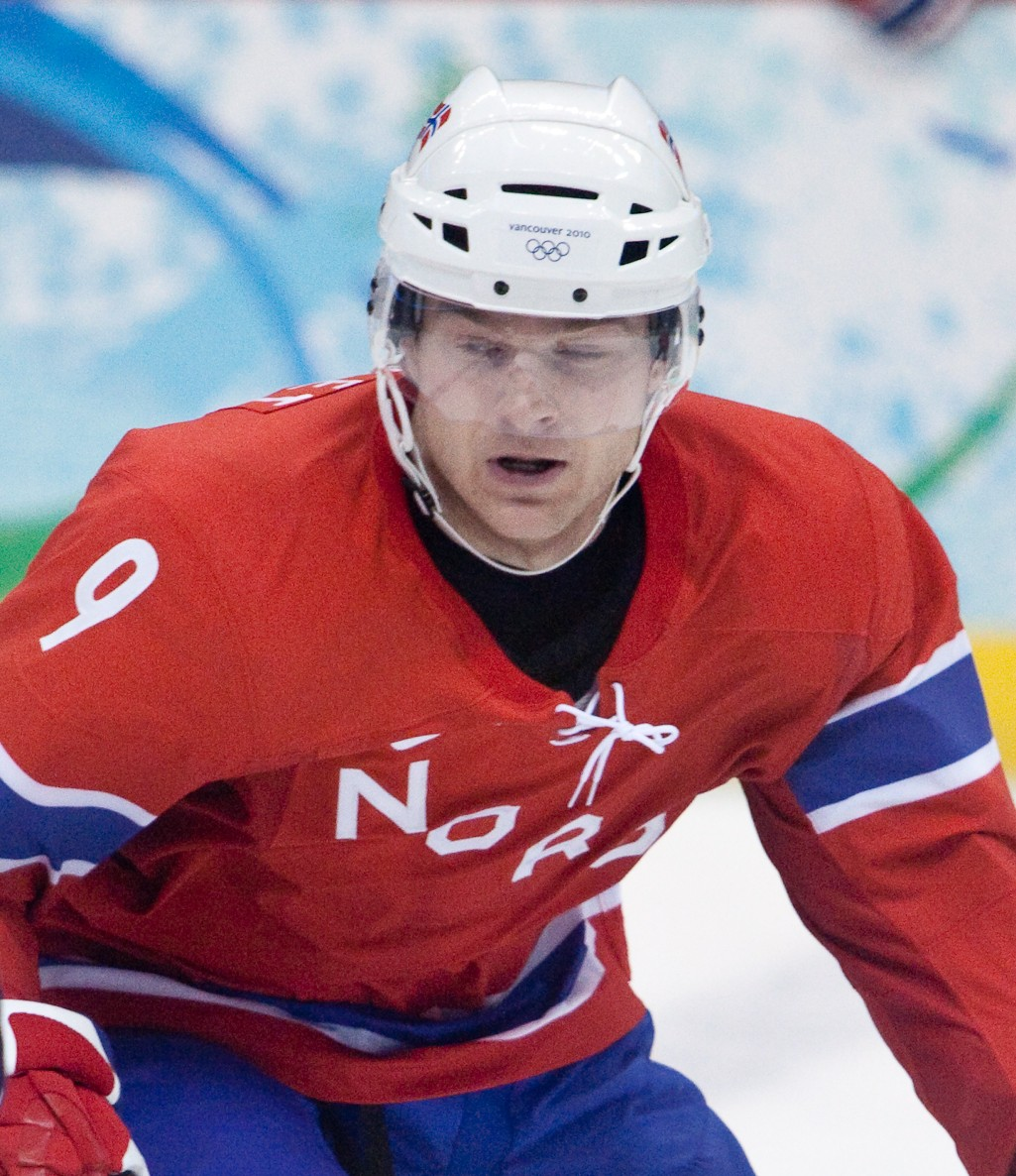
Marius Holtet was selected 42nd overall at the 2002 NHL entry draft by the Dallas Stars.

As of 2026, there are 30 Norwegian ice hockey players that have been selected in the National Hockey League (NHL) Entry Draft.

The 2024 NHL entry draft became the first draft where a Norwegian player was selected in the first round, when the Detroit Red Wings selected Michael Brandsegg-Nygård as the 15th overall pick. This was followed by the Anaheim Ducks selecting Stian Solberg as the 23rd overall pick. Prior to 2024, the highest draft selection was Marius Holtet, who was drafted in the second round, as the 42nd overall in the 2002 NHL entry draft. The 2011 draft marked the first time a Norwegian goaltender was selected, when Steffen Søberg was picked in the third round by the Washington Capitals. Later in the same draft, the Boston Bruins chose fellow goaltender Lars Volden from the Finnish team Espoo Blues. The most notable Norwegian draftee is 2002 NHL All-Star player Espen "Shampo" Knutsen, who played 207 regular season games in the NHL for the Mighty Ducks of Anaheim and most notably for Columbus Blue Jackets.

== Drafted players ==
	Player	Drafted by	Year	Round	Overall	Drafted from
C	Bjørn Skaare	Detroit Red Wings	1978	4th	62nd	Ottawa 67's (OHL)
F	Knut Walbye	New York Islanders	1987	7th	139th	Furuset (GET)
D	Age Ellingsen	Edmonton Oilers	1987	8th	168th	Storhamar Ishockey (GET)
C	Espen Knutsen	Hartford Whalers	1990	10th	204th	Vålerenga (GET)
C	Ole Eskild Dahlstrøm	Minnesota North Stars	1990	11th	218th	Furuset (GET)
D	Tommie Eriksen	Hartford Whalers	1990	11th	225th	Prince Albert Raiders (WHL)
F	Vegar Barlie	Edmonton Oilers	1991	10th	210th	Vålerenga (GET)
D	Anders Myrvold	Quebec Nordiques	1993	5th	127th	Färjestad (SEL)
D	Jarl Espen Ygranes	Montreal Canadiens	1997	9th	228th	Furuset (GET)
C	Tore Vikingstad	St. Louis Blues	1999	6th	180th	Färjestad (SEL)
LW/RW	Marius Holtet	Dallas Stars	2002	2nd	42nd	Färjestad (SEL)
D	Ole-Kristian Tollefsen	Columbus Blue Jackets	2002	3rd	65th	Brandon Wheat Kings (WHL)
C	Scott Winkler	Dallas Stars	2008	3rd	89th	Cedar Rapids RoughRiders (USHL)
C/LW	Mats Frøshaug	Vancouver Canucks	2008	6th	161st	Linköping (SEL)
D	Jonas Holøs	Colorado Avalanche	2008	6th	170th	Sparta Warriors (GET)
RW	Sondre Olden	Toronto Maple Leafs	2010	3rd	79th	Modo (SEL)
G	Steffen Søberg	Washington Capitals	2011	4th	117th	Manglerud Star (GET)
G	Lars Volden	Boston Bruins	2011	6th	181th	Espoo Blues (SM-liiga)
RW	Markus Søberg	Columbus Blue Jackets	2013	6th	165th	Frölunda (SEL)
LW	Kristian Røykås Marthinsen	Washington Capitals	2017	7th	213th	Almtuna J20 (J20 Elitl)
C	Mathias Emilio Pettersen	Calgary Flames	2018	6th	167th	Muskegon Lumberjacks (USHL)
D	Ole Julian Bjørgvik-Holm	Columbus Blue Jackets	2020	5th	145th	Mississauga Steelheads (OHL)
D	Emil Lilleberg	Arizona Coyotes	2021	4th	107th	Sparta Warriors (Fjordkraft-ligaen)
RW	Michael Brandsegg-Nygård	Detroit Red Wings	2024	1st	15th	Mora IK (HockeyAllsvenskan)
D	Stian Solberg	Anaheim Ducks	2024	1st	23rd	Vålerenga (EHL)
D	Ludvig Lafton	Utah Hockey Club	2024	6th	190th	Färjestad BK J20 (J20 Nationell)
LW	Noah Steen	Tampa Bay Lightning	2024	7th	199th	Mora IK (HockeyAllsvenskan)
C	Tinus Luc Koblar	Toronto Maple Leafs	2025	2nd	64th	Leksands IF J20 (J20 Nationell)
C	Mikkel Eriksen	New York Rangers	2025	4th	111th	Färjestad BK J20 (J20 Nationell)
RW	Niklas Aaram-Olsen	Vancouver Canucks	2026	2nd	41st	Örebro HK U20 (U20 Nationell)
