= Ole-Kristian Tollefsen =

Norwegian ice hockey player

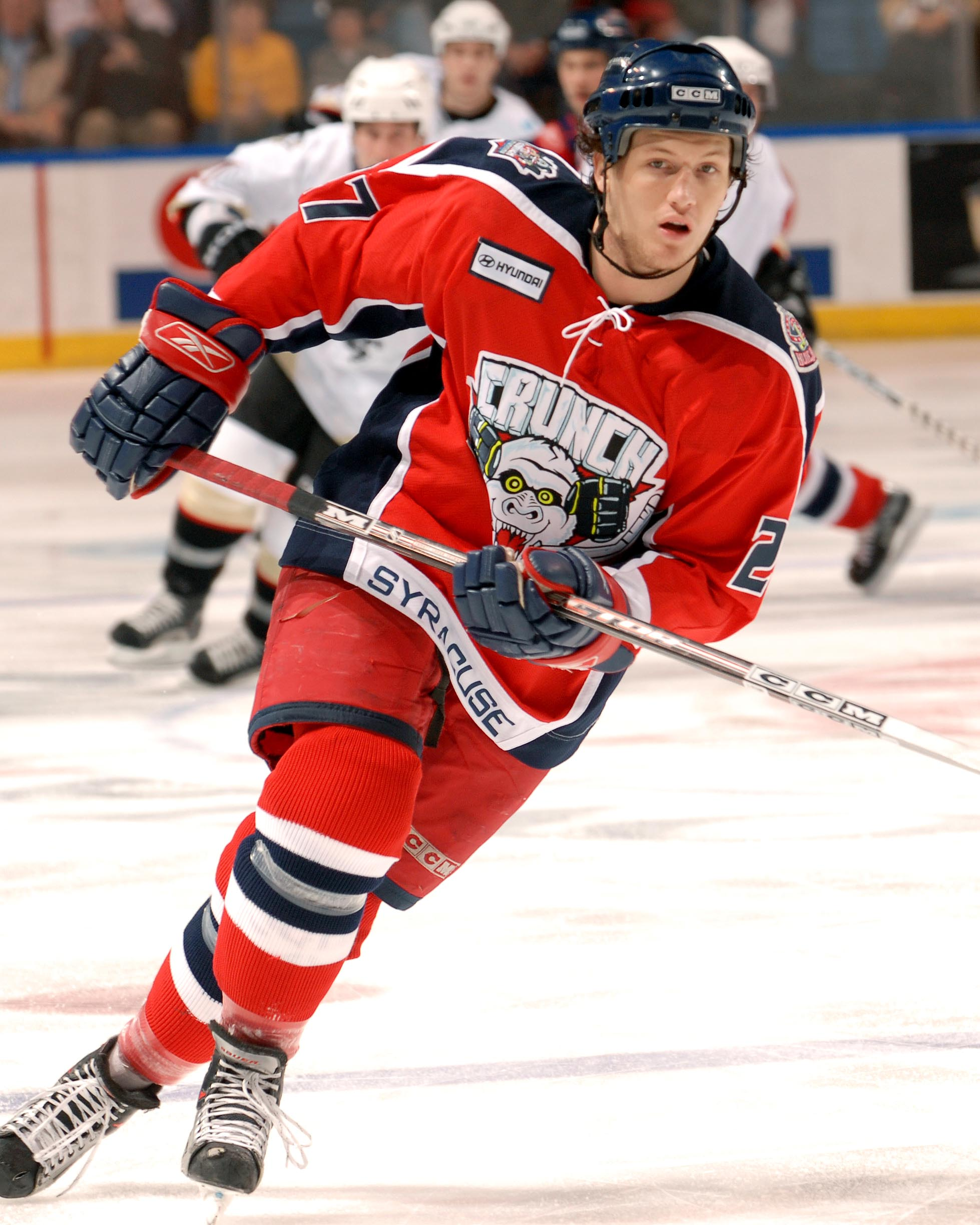
- Tollefson with the Syracuse Crunch in 2006
- Born: 29 March 1984 (age 42) Oslo, Norway
- Height: 6 ft 2 in (188 cm)
- Weight: 207 lb (94 kg; 14 st 11 lb)
- Position: Defence
- Shot: Left
- Played for: Philadelphia Flyers; Columbus Blue Jackets; Modo Hockey; Färjestad BK
- National team: Norway
- NHL draft: 65th overall, 2002; Columbus Blue Jackets
- Playing career: 2005–2017

Ole-Kristian Tollefsen (born 29 March 1984) is a Norwegian former professional ice hockey defenceman who last played for Färjestad BK in Elitserien. He was selected by the Columbus Blue Jackets in the 3rd round (65th overall) of the 2002 NHL entry draft.

Tollefsen was selected to play for the Norway men's national ice hockey team at the 2010 Winter Olympics.

== Playing career ==
=== Early career ===
Ole-Kristian Tollefsen started his ice hockey career playing for Nes IK's youth teams, after one of his friends had talked him into it. He played for teams in the club until he turned 16, when he moved to Lillehammer, to attend the Norwegian College of Elite Sport. In Lillehammer, he is known as "Læfsa". Tollefsen played with Lillehammer Ishockeyklubb for two seasons, spending most of that time on the senior team, instead of any of the club's two junior teams where a player his age should have spent that stage of their career. During the 2001–02 season, he was a regular in the team's starting lineup as they reached fourth place in the Norwegian Elite League, and reached the playoff semi-finals for a bronze medal. He also played for both the junior teams in their playoffs, getting a silver medal with the Elder Junior (Under-20) team, and the gold medal with the Younger Junior (U-18) team. The medals were the last thing he accomplished in the Norwegian league system thus far in his career.

=== Draft and major junior hockey ===
After that impressive season, Tollefsen was drafted by the Columbus Blue Jackets in the third round, 65th overall, in the 2002 NHL entry draft, something that made him one of the highest-drafted Norwegians ever (incidentally, the highest-drafted Norwegian ever, Dallas Stars prospect Marius Holtet, went in the second round, as the 42nd overall pick in the same draft).

The next stop for Tollefsen was the Western Hockey League (WHL), where he played the next two seasons for the Brandon Wheat Kings. During his time in the WHL, he showed that he could adapt to the North American style of play. His physical style of play showed on the 2003–04 Blue Jackets training camp, when one of his hits put star player Geoff Sanderson out of play for a couple of weeks with an injury.

During the 2004–05 NHL lockout season, Tollefsen had signed for the Blue Jackets, but spent most of the season with the Syracuse Crunch of the American Hockey League (AHL), but also had a short trip to the ECHL where he played for the Dayton Bombers.

=== NHL career ===
For the 2005–06 season he started the season in the AHL, but on 23 November he got his NHL debut in a 4–2 loss against the Phoenix Coyotes. He played an additional four games for the Blue Jackets, with two penalty minutes, before he was sent down to Syracuse again, where he spent the rest of the season.

He played in 70 of the Blue Jackets' games in the 2006–07 season. On 10 November he, and fellow Norwegian NHL player Patrick Thoresen, played in the first NHL game ever to have two Norwegian players facing each other, when the Blue Jackets hosted Thoresen's Edmonton Oilers. In Ken Hitchcock's debut as the coach for the Blue Jackets, a 24 November away game against the Philadelphia Flyers, Tollefsen had his first career NHL point when he assisted on Jason Chimera's second period goal, he scored his first goal against the Chicago Blackhawks on 20 March 2007. He started a scoring streak when he forced overtime against Detroit Red Wings in the next game, tying Espen Knutsen's Norwegian NHL record. He accumulated 123 penalty minutes during the season, including fights against Mark Smith, Joffrey Lupul, Jordin Tootoo, and Bill Guerin.

On 30 July 2009, Tollefsen signed a one-year contract with the Philadelphia Flyers.

On 6 February 2010, Tollefsen, along with a 5th-round pick in the 2011 NHL entry draft, was traded to the Detroit Red Wings for Finnish forward Ville Leino.

In January 2018, Tollefsen officially announced his retirement.

== International play ==
Tollefsen played in three matches for Norway during the 2010 Winter Olympics, with no points. He received a 25-minute penalty after checking Slovakia's Ľuboš Bartečko in the head during the quarterfinal play-in game on 23 February 2010.

== Career statistics ==
=== Regular season and playoffs ===
| | | | Regular season | | | | | Playoffs |
| Season | Team | League | GP | G | A | Pts | PIM | GP | G | A | Pts | PIM |
|---|---|---|---|---|---|---|---|---|---|---|---|---|
| 2000–01 | Lillehammer IK | NOR | 8 | 0 | 0 | 0 | 2 | — | — | — | — | — |
| 2001–02 | Lillehammer IK | NOR | 37 | 1 | 5 | 6 | 63 | — | — | — | — | — |
| 2002–03 | Brandon Wheat Kings | WHL | 43 | 6 | 14 | 20 | 73 | 17 | 0 | 2 | 2 | 38 |
| 2003–04 | Brandon Wheat Kings | WHL | 53 | 3 | 27 | 30 | 94 | 11 | 0 | 4 | 4 | 15 |
| 2004–05 | Syracuse Crunch | AHL | 64 | 0 | 3 | 3 | 115 | — | — | — | — | — |
| 2004–05 | Dayton Bombers | ECHL | 2 | 0 | 0 | 0 | 0 | — | — | — | — | — |
| 2005–06 | Syracuse Crunch | AHL | 58 | 2 | 16 | 18 | 155 | 1 | 0 | 0 | 0 | 6 |
| 2005–06 | Columbus Blue Jackets | NHL | 5 | 0 | 0 | 0 | 2 | — | — | — | — | — |
| 2006–07 | Columbus Blue Jackets | NHL | 70 | 2 | 3 | 5 | 123 | — | — | — | — | — |
| 2007–08 | Columbus Blue Jackets | NHL | 51 | 2 | 2 | 4 | 111 | — | — | — | — | — |
| 2008–09 | Columbus Blue Jackets | NHL | 19 | 0 | 1 | 1 | 37 | — | — | — | — | — |
| 2009–10 | Philadelphia Flyers | NHL | 18 | 0 | 2 | 2 | 23 | — | — | — | — | — |
| 2009–10 | Grand Rapids Griffins | AHL | 16 | 1 | 0 | 1 | 44 | — | — | — | — | — |
| 2010–11 | Modo Hockey | SEL | 43 | 1 | 2 | 3 | 95 | — | — | — | — | — |
| 2011–12 | Modo Hockey | SEL | 50 | 2 | 9 | 11 | 62 | 6 | 0 | 0 | 0 | 14 |
| 2012–13 | Färjestad BK | SEL | 54 | 2 | 7 | 9 | 94 | 10 | 0 | 1 | 1 | 32 |
| 2013–14 | Färjestad BK | SEL | 45 | 1 | 5 | 6 | 104 | 15 | 0 | 2 | 2 | 37 |
| 2014–15 | Färjestad BK | SHL | 47 | 2 | 3 | 5 | 88 | — | — | — | — | — |
| 2015–16 | Färjestad BK | SHL | 40 | 0 | 6 | 6 | 55 | 5 | 0 | 0 | 0 | 4 |
| 2016–17 | Färjestad BK | SHL | 40 | 3 | 3 | 6 | 76 | — | — | — | — | — |
| NHL totals | | | 163 | 4 | 8 | 12 | 296 | — | — | — | — | — |
| SHL totals | | | 319 | 11 | 35 | 46 | 574 | 36 | 0 | 3 | 3 | 87 |

=== International ===
| Year | Team | Event | GP | G | A | Pts | PIM |
|---|---|---|---|---|---|---|---|
| 2001 | Norway | WJC18 | 6 | 0 | 0 | 0 | 4 |
| 2002 | Norway | WJC D1 | 5 | 1 | 3 | 4 | 8 |
| 2002 | Norway | WJC18 | 8 | 1 | 1 | 2 | 18 |
| 2003 | Norway | WJC D1 | 5 | 2 | 4 | 6 | 10 |
| 2004 | Norway | WJC D1 | 5 | 1 | 3 | 4 | 2 |
| 2004 | Norway | WC D1 | 5 | 1 | 0 | 1 | 4 |
| 2005 | Norway | WC D1 | 5 | 0 | 0 | 0 | 4 |
| 2010 | Norway | OG | 3 | 0 | 0 | 0 | 25 |
| 2010 | Norway | WC | 3 | 0 | 1 | 1 | 2 |
| 2011 | Norway | WC | 7 | 0 | 1 | 1 | 10 |
| 2012 | Norway | WC | 8 | 0 | 0 | 0 | 20 |
| 2013 | Norway | WC | 5 | 1 | 0 | 1 | 8 |
| 2014 | Norway | OG | 4 | 0 | 0 | 0 | 0 |
| 2015 | Norway | WC | 7 | 0 | 1 | 1 | 8 |
| 2016 | Norway | OGQ | 3 | 0 | 0 | 0 | 2 |
| 2016 | Norway | WC | 7 | 0 | 0 | 0 | 6 |
| Junior totals | | | 15 | 4 | 10 | 14 | 20 |
| Senior totals | | | 57 | 2 | 3 | 5 | 89 |
