= Marius Holtet =

Norwegian ice hockey player (born 1984)

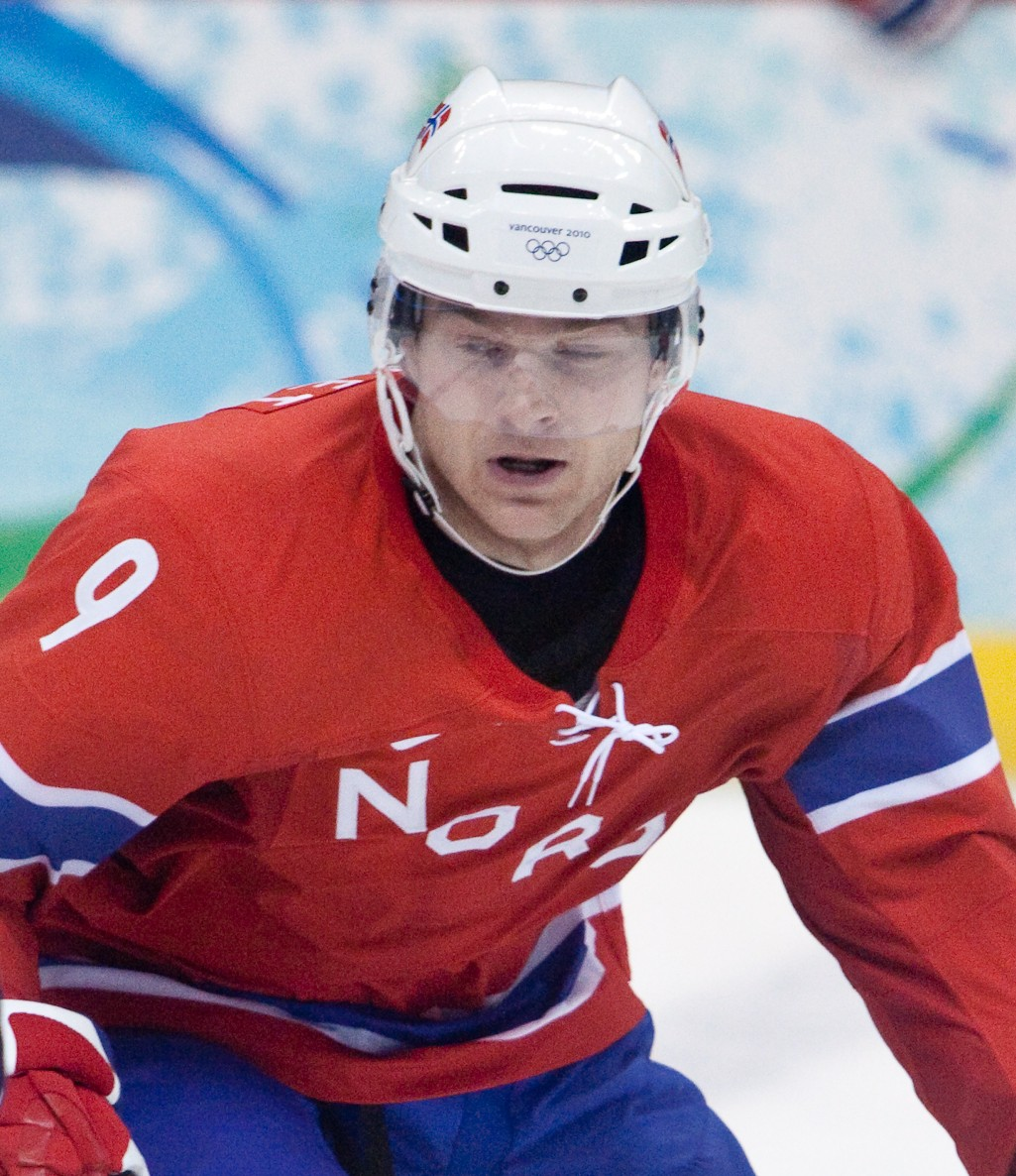
- Born: August 31, 1984 (age 41) Hamar, Norway
- Height: 6 ft 1 in (185 cm)
- Weight: 212 lb (96 kg; 15 st 2 lb)
- Position: Right wing
- Shot: Left
- Played for: Färjestads BK
- National team: Norway
- NHL draft: 42nd overall, 2002; Dallas Stars
- Playing career: 2000–2014

Marius Holtet (born August 31, 1984) is a Norwegian former professional ice hockey forward. Most of his career, which lasted from 2000 to 2014, was spent with Färjestad BK in the Swedish Hockey League. Internationally, Holtet played for the Norwegian national team at several tournaments, including the 2010 Winter Olympics. Holtet was drafted by the Dallas Stars in 2002, the highest-ever Norwegian player drafted, selected 42nd overall.

== Career ==
Holtet started his professional career in 2000 when he signed with Swedish Elitserien club Färjestads BK. Between 2000 and 2002, he played with the club's junior team. At the start of the 2002-03 season, he was assigned to one of Färjestad's farm teams, Skåre BK. Later that season, he was moved to Farjestad's other farm team, Bofors IK of HockeyAllsvenskan. Holtet played with Bofors the rest of that season and also the next.

After the 2004-05 season, Holtet decided to sign with the Stars, who had drafted him three years earlier. In his first season with the Stars' organization, Holtet spent time with the ECHL team Louisiana IceGators and the AHL team Houston Aeros. In the second season, Holtet played with another AHL team, the Iowa Stars. After three seasons in the AHL, he signed a two-year contract with his former club Färjestads BK.

Holtet was forced to retire in 2015 due to head injuries.

== International ==
Holtet has represented Norway in several international tournaments. In 2006, he played with Norway at the Ice Hockey World Championship in Latvia. He also represented Norway at the 2008 IIHF World Championship in Canada.

== Career statistics ==
=== Regular season and playoffs ===
| | | | Regular season | | | | | Playoffs |
| Season | Team | League | GP | G | A | Pts | PIM | GP | G | A | Pts | PIM |
|---|---|---|---|---|---|---|---|---|---|---|---|---|
| 2000–01 | Färjestad BK | J18 Allsv | 5 | 3 | 1 | 4 | 16 | — | — | — | — | — |
| 2000–01 | Färjestad BK | J20 | 18 | 2 | 2 | 4 | 18 | 3 | 0 | 1 | 1 | 0 |
| 2001–02 | Färjestad BK | J18 Allsv | 2 | 0 | 0 | 0 | 2 | — | — | — | — | — |
| 2001–02 | Färjestad BK | J20 | 32 | 12 | 6 | 18 | 52 | 3 | 0 | 1 | 1 | 16 |
| 2002–03 | Bofors IK | Allsv | 14 | 1 | 1 | 2 | 8 | 2 | 0 | 0 | 0 | 2 |
| 2003–04 | Bofors IK | Allsv | 43 | 11 | 3 | 14 | 90 | 5 | 2 | 0 | 2 | 4 |
| 2004–05 | Houston Aeros | AHL | 54 | 7 | 5 | 12 | 48 | 1 | 0 | 0 | 0 | 0 |
| 2004–05 | Louisiana IceGators | ECHL | 4 | 0 | 0 | 0 | 0 | — | — | — | — | — |
| 2005–06 | Iowa Stars | AHL | 68 | 9 | 13 | 22 | 61 | 7 | 2 | 0 | 2 | 2 |
| 2006–07 | Iowa Stars | AHL | 66 | 16 | 15 | 31 | 48 | 11 | 2 | 0 | 2 | 6 |
| 2007–08 | Iowa Stars | AHL | 67 | 10 | 9 | 19 | 37 | — | — | — | — | — |
| 2008–09 | Färjestad BK | SEL | 49 | 3 | 5 | 8 | 26 | 13 | 3 | 1 | 4 | 0 |
| 2009–10 | Färjestad BK | SEL | 55 | 5 | 4 | 9 | 42 | 6 | 0 | 0 | 0 | 10 |
| 2010–11 | Färjestad BK | SEL | 55 | 4 | 4 | 8 | 14 | 14 | 2 | 2 | 4 | 6 |
| 2011–12 | Färjestad BK | SEL | 51 | 8 | 6 | 14 | 55 | 11 | 3 | 3 | 6 | 6 |
| 2012–13 | Färjestad BK | SEL | 52 | 9 | 10 | 19 | 50 | 10 | 3 | 1 | 4 | 6 |
| 2013–14 | Färjestad BK | SHL | 29 | 5 | 2 | 7 | 18 | — | — | — | — | — |
| AHL totals | | | 255 | 42 | 42 | 84 | 194 | 19 | 4 | 0 | 4 | 8 |
| SEL/SHL totals | | | 291 | 34 | 31 | 65 | 205 | 54 | 11 | 7 | 18 | 28 |

=== International ===
| Year | Team | Event | GP | G | A | Pts | PIM |
|---|---|---|---|---|---|---|---|
| 2001 | Norway | WJC18 | 6 | 2 | 2 | 4 | 6 |
| 2002 | Norway | WJC D1 | 5 | 0 | 1 | 1 | 2 |
| 2002 | Norway | WJC18 | 8 | 5 | 3 | 8 | 12 |
| 2003 | Norway | WJC D1 | 5 | 4 | 3 | 7 | 16 |
| 2003 | Norway | WC D1 | 5 | 0 | 0 | 0 | 2 |
| 2004 | Norway | WJC D1 | 5 | 5 | 3 | 8 | 10 |
| 2006 | Norway | WC | 6 | 1 | 1 | 2 | 4 |
| 2008 | Norway | WC | 7 | 1 | 1 | 2 | 4 |
| 2009 | Norway | OGQ | 3 | 0 | 0 | 0 | 2 |
| 2009 | Norway | WC | 2 | 0 | 0 | 0 | 0 |
| 2010 | Norway | OLY | 4 | 1 | 0 | 1 | 0 |
| 2010 | Norway | WC | 4 | 0 | 0 | 0 | 4 |
| 2011 | Norway | WC | 7 | 6 | 2 | 8 | 4 |
| 2012 | Norway | WC | 7 | 2 | 3 | 5 | 4 |
| 2013 | Norway | WC | 6 | 1 | 0 | 1 | 6 |
| Junior totals | | | 29 | 16 | 12 | 28 | 46 |
| Senior totals | | | 51 | 12 | 7 | 19 | 30 |
