= Anders Myrvold =

Norwegian ice hockey player

- Born: 12 August 1975 (age 50) Lørenskog, Norway
- Height: 6 ft 1 in (185 cm)
- Weight: 178 lb (81 kg; 12 st 10 lb)
- Position: Defence
- Shot: Left
- Played for: Vålerenga IF; Stavanger Oilers; Stjernen; Frisk Tigers; NHL; Colorado Avalanche; Boston Bruins; New York Islanders; Detroit Red Wings; Elitserien; Färjestads BK; Djurgårdens IF; AIK
- National team: Norway
- NHL draft: 127th overall, 1993; Quebec Nordiques
- Playing career: 1993–2011

Anders Myrvold (born 12 August 1975) is a Norwegian former professional ice hockey player, who last played for Norwegian GET-ligaen club Frisk Tigers. He made his National Hockey League (NHL) debut for the Colorado Avalanche on 6 October 1995, and has been part of the Norwegian national team. In the NHL, Myrvold played for Colorado (he was drafted by the team's predecessor, the Quebec Nordiques), Boston Bruins, New York Islanders, and Detroit Red Wings. He played four games in the 1995–96 Colorado Avalanche season when they became Stanley Cup Champions. Myrvold did not play enough games to have his name engraved on the Stanley Cup.

== Personal life ==
=== Assault and head injury ===
On 23 December 2006, Myrvold was assaulted after a Christmas party in Oslo. He received injuries to his head and successfully underwent surgery at Ullevål university hospital. Despite all his struggles he managed to come back to the ice, and was an important part of the success when the national team reached the quarter-finals at the 2008 IIHF World Championship in Canada.

=== Cocaine abuse ===
In November 2007 Myrvold told the Norwegian newspaper Verdens Gang that he had been abusing cocaine for a lengthy period of time. His first time trying the drug was at a party following a game in Detroit. At the time of the interview Myrvold had just finished a 7-week rehab program.

A three-year contract with Stavanger Oilers which Myrvold had signed in June 2008 was cancelled by the club in June 2009 after Myrvold had refused to undergo a drug test which the club had mandated, suspecting that his substance abuse had returned.

=== Assault charge ===
In 2010, Myrvold was charged with assault for resisting arrest after allegedly attacking a guest at a restaurant with a golf club.

== Career statistics ==
=== Regular season and playoffs ===
			Regular season					Playoffs
Season	Team	League	GP	G	A	Pts	PIM	GP	G	A	Pts	PIM
1991–92	Storhamar	NOR	1	0	0	0	4	—	—	—	—	—
1992–93	Färjestads BK	SEL	2	0	0	0	0	—	—	—	—	—
1993–94	Grums IK	SWE-2	26	2	0	2	34	2	1	0	1	5
1994–95	Laval Titan	QMJHL	64	14	50	64	173	20	4	10	14	68
1994–95	Cornwall Aces	AHL	—	—	—	—	—	3	0	1	1	2
1995–96	Colorado Avalanche	NHL	4	0	1	1	6	—	—	—	—	—
1995–96	Cornwall Aces	AHL	70	5	24	29	125	5	1	0	1	19
1996–97	Hershey Bears	AHL	20	0	3	3	16	—	—	—	—	—
1996–97	Boston Bruins	NHL	9	0	2	2	4	—	—	—	—	—
1996–97	Providence Bruins	AHL	53	6	15	21	107	10	0	1	1	6
1997–98	Providence Bruins	AHL	75	4	21	25	91	—	—	—	—	—
1998–99	Djurgårdens IF	SEL	29	3	4	7	52	—	—	—	—	—
1998–99	AIK	SEL	19	1	3	4	24	—	—	—	—	—
1999–00	AIK	SEL	49	1	3	4	87	—	—	—	—	—
2000–01	New York Islanders	NHL	12	0	1	1	0	—	—	—	—	—
2000–01	Springfield Falcons	AHL	69	5	25	30	129	—	—	—	—	—
2001–02	Hartford Wolf Pack	AHL	19	3	3	6	28	—	—	—	—	—
2001–02	HC Fribourg-Gottéron	NLA	6	0	0	0	16	4	0	1	1	6
2002–03	Adler Mannheim	DEL	45	0	3	3	82	7	0	0	0	4
2003–04	Detroit Red Wings	NHL	8	0	1	1	2	—	—	—	—	—
2003–04	Grand Rapids Griffins	AHL	71	0	21	21	94	4	0	1	1	2
2004–05	Vålerenga IF	GET	40	8	24	32	108	11	2	1	3	24
2005–06	ZSC Lions	NLA	2	0	0	0	4	—	—	—	—	—
2005–06	GCK Lions	NLB	8	0	5	5	20	—	—	—	—	—
2005–06	Vålerenga IF	GET	12	3	2	5	38	15	1	5	6	30
2006–07	Vålerenga IF	GET	17	0	11	11	34	—	—	—	—	—
2007–08	Vålerenga IF	GET	14	0	2	2	26	13	1	5	6	28
2008–09	Stavanger Oilers	GET	44	6	24	30	120	—	—	—	—	—
2009–10	Stjernen	GET	40	2	22	24	88	6	0	0	0	10
2010–11	Frisk Asker	GET	43	1	9	10	136	5	1	0	1	8
GET totals			211	20	94	114	554	50	5	11	16	100
NHL totals			33	0	5	5	12	—	—	—	—	—

=== International ===
Year	Team	Event	GP	G	A	Pts	PIM
1991	Norway	EJC	5	0	1	1	12
1992	Norway	EJC	6	3	0	3	16
1993	Norway	EJC	6	1	1	2	12
1993	Norway	WJC-B	7	5	1	6	10
1994	Norway	WJC-B	7	0	2	2	14
1994	Norway	WC	6	1	0	1	6
1995	Norway	WJC-B	7	0	3	3	36
1998	Norway	WC-B	7	0	6	6	14
1999	Norway	WC	6	0	1	1	10
2002	Norway	WC-D1	5	4	1	5	8
2003	Norway	WC-D1	5	1	1	2	4
2005	Norway	WC-D1	5	1	5	6	0
2006	Norway	WC	6	0	3	3	12
2008	Norway	WC	7	0	0	0	22
2009	Norway	WC	6	0	1	1	12
Junior totals			38	9	8	17	100
Senior totals			46	7	12	19	74
