= Jon Haukeland =

Norwegian ice hockey coach and administrator (born 1953)

- Born: 18 March 1953 (age 72); Oslo, Norway
- Occupation(s): Ice hockey coach and administrator
- Known for: Norwegian Ice Hockey Association
- Awards: Paul Loicq Award (2025)

Jon Norman Haukeland (born 18 March 1953) is a Norwegian ice hockey coach and administrator. He was the first sport director of the Norwegian Ice Hockey Association, and was later its general secretary. He was central to establishment of player development programs, and sought to increase participation and ice rinks in the country, and held several roles with Norway's national teams. He represented the association at the Winter Olympic Games and the Ice Hockey World Championships, sat on multiple International Ice Hockey Federation (IIHF) committees, and coordinated the Euro Ice Hockey Challenge. He received the Paul Loicq Award from the IIHF in 2025, for contributions to international hockey.

== Norwegian Ice Hockey Association ==
Jon Norman Haukeland was born on 18 March 1953, in Oslo, Norway. (Note: Full name: Jon Norman Haukeland. Birth date: 18 March 1953. Birth place: Oslo, Norway.) He began working for the Norwegian Ice Hockey Association (NIHA) as a consultant in 1982, later becoming its first sport director, and then general secretary. He was central to establishment of the NIHA player development program in the early 1990s, and the subsequent "Polar Bear model" for children. (Note: The polar bear appears on the Norwegian Ice Hockey Association logo. The NIHA's parent handbook for ice hockey details the "Polar Bear model" for ice hockey.) During this time, he was an instructor at minor ice hockey clinics in Norway.

Wanting to develop ice hockey with Norway, Haukeland sought to increase player registrations, and the number of ice rinks. The country had fewer than 10,000 players in 2013, the same year that the NIHA announced plans to construct 30 new indoor rinks within the years. Working with the Ministry of Culture and Equality to increase funding for construction, Haukeland oversaw distribution of grants to cities seeking to build rinks. While hockey was Norway's largest spectator sport indoors, he noted that viewership for televised hockey was lacking.

When the NIHA wanted to include a professional team from Northern Norway into the Norwegian league system, teams from South Norway rejected the proposal and threatened to withdraw due to increased travel. Haukeland felt it challenging to integrate Tromsø Hockey, and collaborated with the Swedish Ice Hockey Association and Finnish Ice Hockey Association to find leagues for teams based on geography. Amid calls for the winning team of the Norwegian Second Division to gain automatic promotion to the Norwegian First Division, Haukeland defended the system of applying for promotion since it ensured that teams are prepared financially and talentwise, and he noted that several clubs declined promotion to a higher level.

Haukeland held several roles with Norway's national teams, and represented the NIHA at the Winter Olympic Games and the Ice Hockey World Championships. He has been an assistant coach and general manager for both the men's under-18 team and the men's junior team, and a general manager for the men's national team. He also arranged travel and admission tickets for Norwegian ultras at international events. During his tenure, the men's national team has played at the top tier of the Ice Hockey World Championships since 2006.

Retiring as the general secretary in 2014, Haukeland transitioned into a new position as head of the player development program. He stated that getting back into development was "what I'm most passionate about", and that the program "is both about purely structural conditions and about the individual athlete". He remained a special advisor on player development until 2019.

== International Ice Hockey Federation ==
With the International Ice Hockey Federation (IIHF), Haukeland sat on committees for junior ice hockey (1998–2008), international competition (2008–2012), development and coaching (2013–2016), and youth and junior development (2016–2021). In coordination with Zoltán Kovács and others, he oversaw annual tournaments in the Euro Ice Hockey Challenge for national teams.

Haukeland received the Paul Loicq Award in 2025, the highest individual award from the IIHF for contributions to international hockey. He became the second Norwegian to receive a lifetime honor from the IIHF, after Tore Johannessen was inducted into the IIHF Hall of Fame in 1999. Unable to attend the ceremony at the 2025 IIHF World Championship in Sweden, Haukeland wrote that hockey "has given me far more than I ever imagined", "ice hockey has been my passion", and that "player development has always been near and dear to my heart".
