= Paul Loicq Award =

International ice hockey award

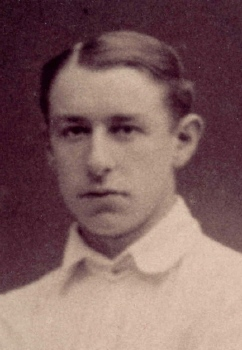
Paul Loicq

The Paul Loicq Award is presented annually by the International Ice Hockey Federation (IIHF) to honour a person who has made "outstanding contributions to the IIHF and international ice hockey". Named after Paul Loicq, who was president of the IIHF from 1922 until 1947, it is the highest personal recognition given by the IIHF. The award is presented during the annual IIHF Hall of Fame induction ceremony.

== Recipients ==
List of recipients of the Paul Loicq Award:

| Year | Recipient | Nation | Contributions |
|---|---|---|---|
| 1998 | Wolf-Dieter Montag | Germany | IIHF chief medical officer and International Olympic Committee medical advisor who oversaw doping in sport testing and advocated for athlete safety |
| 1999 | Roman Neumayer | Germany | German Ice Hockey Federation sport director from 1970 to 1986, and IIHF technical director from 1986 to 1996, who developed the IIHF Hall of Fame |
| 2000 | Vsevolod Kukushkin | Russia | Russian journalist and translator who traveled with the Soviet Union national ice hockey team reporting on international ice hockey, and IIHF Hall of Fame committee member |
| 2001 | Isao Kataoka | Japan | Japan Ice Hockey Federation executive director and vice-president, who grew ice hockey in Japan and organized hockey at the 1972 Winter Olympics and 1998 Winter Olympics |
| 2002 | Pat Marsh | (United Kingdom) Great Britain | British Ice Hockey Association secretary from 1972 to 1987, and secretary to IIHF president Bunny Ahearne, who worked more than 20 years in the IIHF offices |
| 2003 | George Nagobads | United States | US men's national team physician at five Winter Olympics, and chief medical officer for USA Hockey from 1984 to 1992, who served on the IIHF medical committee for 20 years, working to eliminate doping in sport |
| 2004 | Aggie Kukulowicz | Canada | Russian-language interpreter for the Canada men's national team at the 1972 Summit Series and 1974 Summit Series, who was later an interpreter for the IIHF at the Ice Hockey World Championships, the Canada Cup, and the Super Series from 1975 to 1993 |
| 2005 | Rita Hrbacek | Austria | Forty years of organizing international ice hockey as secretary, then secretary general of the Austrian Ice Hockey Association, and as an IIHF secretary |
| 2006 | Bo Tovland | Sweden | General manager of the Sweden men's national team at seven Ice Hockey World Championships, three Winter Olympics and three Canada Cup tournaments, who was Swedish Ice Hockey Association vice-chairman and sat on several IIHF committees |
| 2007 | Bob Nadin | Canada | Supervisor of on-ice officials at the Winter Olympic Games from 1976 to 2012, responsible for training and evaluating officials, and writing, updating, and interpreting international ice hockey rules. |
| 2008 | Juraj Okoličány | Slovakia | Supervisor of on-ice officials and a video goal judge during ten Ice Hockey World Championships, the 2002 Winter Olympics and 2006 Winter Olympics, and 45 other IIHF competitions |
| 2009 | Harald Griebel | Germany | Sports marketing businessman promoting the Ice Hockey World Championships and qualifying tournaments for ice hockey at the Olympic Games |
| 2010 | Lou Vairo | United States | Amateur Hockey Association of the United States coaching director, USA Hockey director, and IIHF coaching committee member, who coached national men's teams for the United States, Netherlands, and Italy |
| 2011 | Yuri Korolev | Russia | Ice Hockey Federation of Russia vice-president and IIHF coaching committee chairman, who led research for the Soviet Union national team that won seventeen Ice Hockey World Championships and seven Olympic gold medals |
| 2012 | Kent Angus | Canada | Nike, Inc. representative and supplier of IIHF team hockey jerseys for 49 Ice Hockey World Championships, four Winter Olympics, and more than 75,000 hockey jerseys. |
| 2013 | Gord Miller | Canada | Play-by-play sportscaster for the IIHF World Junior Championship, Ice Hockey World Championships, and IIHF Women's World Championship |
| 2014 | Mark Aubry | Canada | Chief medical officer of the IIHF and Hockey Canada, and International Olympic Committee medical commission member, who advocates for concussion and safety awareness |
| 2015 | Monique Scheier-Schneider | Luxembourg | Luxembourg Ice Hockey Federation secretary and IIHF council member who managed the Luxembourg men's national team and oversaw the 2010 Winter Olympics Women's ice hockey tournament and 2011 IIHF Women's World Championship |
| 2016 | Nikolai Ozerov | Russia | Leading Soviet Union sports commentator from the 1950s to 1980s, who covered ice hockey at eight Olympics and thirty Ice Hockey World Championships |
| 2017 | Patrick Francheterre | France | French Ice Hockey Federation director, France men's national team general manager, and IIHF council member |
| 2018 | Kirovs Lipmans | Latvia | Latvian Ice Hockey Federation president, Latvian Olympic Committee executive member, and IIHF committee member, who increased ice hockey rinks in Latvia and saw the Latvia men's national team qualify for the top tier of the World Championships |
| 2019 | Jim Johannson | United States | USA Hockey executive and general manager of the US men's national team, who grew hockey in the United States and saw its national teams won a 64 medals in IIHF competitions |
| 2020/2022 (Note: The presentation of the award during the 2020 IIHF World Championship, was delayed until the 2022 IIHF World Championship due to the COVID-19 pandemic. Kovács received the award during the class of 2020/2022 IIHF Hall of Fame induction.) | Zoltán Kovács | Hungary | Hungarian Ice Hockey Federation general secretary and vice-president, who oversaw growth of hockey in the country and the Hungary men's national junior team earn promotion to Division I of the IIHF World U20 Championship |
| 2023 | Kimmo Leinonen | Finland | IIHF director of public relations and marketing from 1995 to 2007, who was general secretary of the 2012 and 2013 Ice Hockey World Championships co-hosted in Finland and Sweden, and helped establish the IIHF Hall of Fame |
| 2024 | Anatolii Brezvin | Ukraine | Ice Hockey Federation of Ukraine president, who oversaw establishment of a national youth hockey championship, and created a Ukrainian women's championship, entered the Ukraine women's national team into the World Women's Championship, and oversaw hosting 17 IIHF events in Ukraine |
| 2025 | Jon Haukeland | Norway | Inaugural Norwegian Ice Hockey Association sport director and later its general secretary, central to establishment of player development programs and increasing participation and ice rinks in the country, and coordinated the Euro Ice Hockey Challenge |
| 2026 | Pat Cortina | Canada | Coached men's national teams for Italy and Germany, the Hungary men's and women's national team, coached in multiple European professional leagues |

== See also ==
- Torriani Award
