= Slovak Ice Hockey Federation =

Sports governing body

Slovakia
- Association name: Slovak Ice Hockey Federation
- IIHF Code: SVK
- IIHF membership: February 2, 1993
- President: Miroslav Šatan
- IIHF men's ranking: 9 (▼1) (26 May 2025)
- IIHF women's ranking: 15 (21 April 2025)

The Slovak Ice Hockey Federation (Slovak: Slovenský zväz ľadového hokeja, SZĽH) is the governing body that oversees ice hockey in Slovakia.

Paul Loicq Award recipient Juraj Okoličány served as chairman and vice-president of the federation from 1990 to 2003.

== National teams ==
- Slovakia men's national ice hockey team
- Slovakia men's national junior ice hockey team
- Slovakia men's national under-18 ice hockey team
- Slovakia women's national ice hockey team
- Slovakia women's national under-18 ice hockey team
