= Pierre de Coubertin Medal =

Sports award

- Awarded for: Institutions with a pedagogical and educational role and to people who, through their research and the creation of intellectual works in the spirit of Pierre de Coubertin, contribute to the promotion of Olympism.
- Presented by: International Olympic Committee (IOC)
- First award: 1997
- Website: http://www.olympic.org/

The Pierre de Coubertin Medal is a special decoration awarded by the International Olympic Committee that "pays tribute to institutions with a pedagogical and educational role and to people who, through their research and the creation of intellectual works in the spirit of Pierre de Coubertin, contribute to the promotion of Olympism." It was designed by André Ricard Sala, with one face featuring a portrait of Coubertin and the other showing the Olympic motto and rings.

The medal is not the same award as the Pierre de Coubertin World Trophy, which was inaugurated in 1965 and is awarded by the International Fair Play Committee, although the two are often confused. For example, some news media reported on 22 August 2016 that Nikki Hamblin and Abbey D'Agostino had received the medal after colliding with each other on the track during the 5000 m event and assisting each other to continue the race. The New Zealand Olympic Committee said that no such award had yet been made, and The Guardian later corrected their report confirming "the award was the International Fair Play Committee Award rather than the Pierre de Coubertin award". It is also regularly mentioned that the first winner of the Pierre de Coubertin Medal was the Italian bobsledder Eugenio Monti in 1964, although in fact he became the first winner of the Pierre de Coubertin World Trophy. Lawrence Lemieux didn't receive the medal either.

A medal awarded since 1969 "for outstanding merits in the Olympic Movement" by the Austrian Olympic Committee (ÖOC) called the Pierre de Coubertin-Medaille, 'Pierre de Coubertin Medal' has given rise to further confusion. The first recipients at a ceremony held on 23 June 1969 at the Museum of the 20th Century in Vienna were Austrian President Franz Jonas, IOC President Avery Brundage, IOC member Manfred Mautner Markhof, the Minister of Education Theodor Piffl-Perčević, the ÖOC President Heinrich Drimmel, and the ÖOC Hon. Secretary-General Edgar Fried. Later recipients include Rudolf Sallinger, Pat Hickey, and Dieter Kalt Sr.

== Recipients ==
Recipient	Country	Accomplishment(s)	Date	Place
Juan Antonio Samaranch	Spain	Seventh President of the International Olympic Committee	6 September 1997	Lausanne, Switzerland
Leon Štukelj	Slovenia	—	12 November 1999 (Note: awarded posthumously)	Maribor, Slovenia
Raymond Gafner	Switzerland	—	1999	—
Rainier III, Prince of Monaco	Monaco	—	2000	—
João Havelange	Brazil	—	2000	—
Gianni Agnelli	Italy	—	2000	—
Alain Danet	France	—	2000	—
Kurt Furgler	Switzerland	—	2000	—
Henry Kissinger	United States	—	2000	—
Yoshiaki Tsutsumi	Japan	—	2000	—
Emil Zátopek	Czechoslovakia	1952 Summer Olympics	6 December 2000	Prague, Czech Republic
Kéba Mbaye	Senegal	—	2001	—
Rudolf Leising	Switzerland	—	2001	—
Wolf Lyberg	Sweden	Sports journalist, "for his many contributions to the International Olympic Committee and to the Olympic Family"	July 2001 (awarded); 22 November 2001 (presented)	Moscow, Russia; Stockholm, Sweden
Spencer Eccles	United States	2002 Winter Olympics	February 2002	Salt Lake City, United States
Frieder Roskam	Germany	German architect, "for his groundbreaking work in sports facility construction"	30 April 2002	Cologne, Germany
Artur Takac	Switzerland	—	2002	—
Conrado Durantez	Spain	—	2002	—
Hilda Múdra	Slovakia	—	2002	—
Cecilia Tait	Peru	First Peruvian recipient, "in recognition of her contribution to the promotion of women in sport"	21 March 2003	Lausanne, Switzerland
Walburga Grimm	Germany	—	2003	—
Marino Ercolani Casadei	San Marino	—	2003	—
Julio Ernesto Cassanello	Argentina	President of the Argentine Olympic Committee 2005–09	2003	—
Vanderlei de Lima	Brazil	In recognition of his exceptional demonstration of fair play and Olympic values during the 2004 Summer Olympics	29 August 2004	Athens, Greece
Elena Belova	Belarus	Presented at the 2007 XI International Scientific Congress	17 May 2007	Minsk, Belarus
Shaul Ladany	Israel	For "unusual outstanding sports achievements during a span covering over four decades"	17 May 2007	Minsk, Belarus
Viktor Khotochkin	Russia	First Vice-President, the Russian Olympic Committee (2002–2009), "for his outstanding contribution to the development of the International Olympic Movement"	2007	—
Viktor Mamatov	Russia	—	2008	—
Manfred Bergman	Israel	For services rendered to the International Olympic Committee and the Olympic cause	December 2008	Lausanne, Switzerland
Ronald Harvey	Australia	Former CEO of the Australian Sports Commission and Director of the Australian Institute of Sport, first Australian recipient	2 April 2009	Australia
Emanuel Bosák	Czech Republic	—	May 2009	Jičín, Czech Republic
Xia Geng	China	Mayor of Qingdao 2003–2012, "to thank Qingdao City for its efforts in the Olympic Movement"	22 July 2009	Qingdao, China
Boyan Radev	Bulgaria	—	15 September 2009	—
Gagik Tsarukyan	Armenia	President of the Armenian Olympic Committee, "for his invaluable contribution to the development of sport in Armenia"	13 November 2010	Yerevan, Armenia
Eric Monnin	France	Olympic education specialist	August 2012 (awarded); 6 August 2013 (presented)	—
Bob Nadin	Canada	Veteran ice hockey referee and referee supervisor, medal presented at the 2013 IIHF World Championship	May 2013	Stockholm, Sweden
Richard Garneau	Canada	French Canadian sports broadcaster, "for his lifetime dedication to Olympism"	6 February 2014	Sochi, Russia
Hermann Andrecs	Austria	Co-founder and former president of the Austrian Olympic Academy, "for services to the Olympic Movement"	10 September 2014	Vienna, Austria
Michael Hwang	Singapore	"Exceptional services to the Olympic Movement"	13 October 2014	Singapore
Geraint John	United Kingdom	First British recipient for "many years of outstanding service to the Olympic Movement while bringing a wealth of experience and expertise to Olympic design"	28 November 2014	London, England
Petros Synadinos	Greece	Member of the Hellenic Olympic Committee and President of the Hellenic Archery Federation, "for his multi-year and multifaceted contribution to the Olympics and sports"	2016	Athens, Greece
Eduard von Falz-Fein	Liechtenstein	"Long service to the Olympic Movement"	17 February 2017	Vaduz, Liechtenstein
Lü Junjie	China	First Zisha artist to be awarded, for "his work using Zisha to spread the Olympic spirit"	15 January 2018	Lausanne, Switzerland
Han Meilin	China	Designer of the Fuwa, mascots of the 2008 Summer Olympics	24 April 2018	Lausanne, Switzerland
Diego Pulido Aragón	Guatemala	Guatemalan banker and funder "for believing that through sports, culture and education, we can build a better future for our country"	28 August 2018	Guatemala City, Guatemala
Aldons Vrubļevskis	Latvia	Former President of the Latvian NOC	28 November 2020	Sigulda, Latvia
André Leclercq	France	At the 70th anniversary of the French Pierre de Coubertin Committee	5 November 2021	Lausanne, Switzerland
Cui Jingzhe	China	Chinese artist, for "[his] efforts in spreading the Olympic spirit through art"	11 January 2022	Beijing, China
George Hirthler	United States	Author of The Idealist about Pierre de Coubertin	23 June 2022	Lausanne, Switzerland
Rolf Lukaschewski	Germany	German-born contemporary artist for "[his] inspiring positive expression of channelling the vision of Coubertin through [his] extraordinary art"	23 June 2022	Lausanne, Switzerland
Kim Min-jae	South Korea	Korean sports photographer, first Korean recipient	May 2018 (awarded); 19 October 2022 (presented)	Seoul, South Korea
Michael Robert Payne	United Kingdom	Author of the 2021 IOC book Toon In!	1 December 2022	Lausanne, Switzerland
Elguja Berishvili	Georgia	First Vice President of the Georgian National Olympic Committee, "for his contribution to the Olympic movement". First Georgian recipient.	April 2023 (awarded); August 2024 (presented)	Paris, France
Jean Durry	France	Author of Coubertin autographe – Tome I (1889–1915) about Pierre de Coubertin	23 June 2023	Lausanne, Switzerland
Ed Hula	United States	Editor and Founder of Around the Rings	23 June 2023	Lausanne, Switzerland
David Miller	United Kingdom	Journalist and Olympic historian, author of Igniting the Games: The Evolution of the Olympics and Thomas Bach's Legacy (2022)	November 2023	London, England
Telmo Guerra	Portugal	Portuguese artist, first Portuguese recipient	21 June 2024	Lausanne, Switzerland

== See also ==
- Olympic Cup
- Olympic diploma
- Olympic Diploma of Merit
- Olympic Laurel
- Olympic medal
- Olympic Order
