= 2002–03 Euro Ice Hockey Challenge =

The 2002-03 Euro Ice Hockey Challenge was the first edition of the tournament. 14 countries participated in 12 tournaments, divided into four sessions, which took place in September, November, December, and February.

== September session ==
=== Riga Tournament ===
The tournament was played in Riga, Latvia from August 30 to September 1, 2002. It was won by Latvia.

	Team	Pts	GP	W	T	L	GF	GA	Diff
1	Latvia	6	3	3	0	0	14	4	+10
2	Denmark	3	3	1	1	1	8	9	-1
3	France	2	3	1	0	2	4	10	-6
4	Ukraine	1	3	0	1	2	7	10	-3

=== Sëlva Tournament ===
The tournament was played in Sëlva, Italy from August 30 to September 1, 2002. It was won by Norway.

	Team	Pts	GP	W	OTW	T	OTL	L	GF	GA	Diff
1	Norway	6	3	3	0	0	0	0	10	3	+7
2	Poland	4	3	2	0	0	0	1	7	1	+6
3	Netherlands	2	3	0	1	0	0	2	6	15	-9
4	Italy	0	3	0	0	0	1	2	6	10	-4

=== Nottingham Tournament ===
The tournament was played in Nottingham, Great Britain from August 30 to September 1, 2002. It was won by Belarus.

	Team	Pts	GP	W	OTW	T	OTL	L	GF	GA	Diff
1	Belarus	6	3	3	0	0	0	0	12	3	+9
2	Slovenia	3	3	1	0	1	0	1	9	9	0
3	Hungary	2	3	1	0	0	0	2	8	8	0
4	Great Britain	0	3	0	0	1	0	2	7	16	-9

== November session ==
=== Székesfehérvár and Dunaújváros Tournament ===
The tournament was played in Székesfehérvár and Dunaújváros, Hungary from November 8–10, 2002. It was won by Ukraine.

	Team	Pts	GP	W	T	L	GF	GA	Diff
1	Ukraine	6	3	3	0	0	14	0	+14
2	Slovenia	3	3	1	1	1	6	8	-2
3	Great Britain	2	3	1	0	2	3	8	-5
4	Hungary	1	3	0	1	2	2	9	-7

=== Asker Tournament ===
The tournament was played in Asker, Norway from November 8–10, 2002. It was won by Austria.

	Team	Pts	GP	W	OTW	T	OTL	L	GF	GA	Diff
1	Austria	4	3	2	0	0	0	1	9	8	+1
2	Belarus	4	3	2	0	0	0	1	12	8	+4
3	Poland	2	3	1	0	0	0	2	10	10	0
4	Norway	2	3	1	0	0	0	2	8	13	-5

=== Trofeo Olivier Lesieur ===
The tournament was played in Belfort and Mulhouse, France from November 8–10, 2002. It was won by Denmark.

	Team	Pts	GP	W	OTW	T	OTL	L	GF	GA	Diff
1	Denmark	5	3	1	1	1	0	0	7	5	+2
2	Latvia	3	3	1	0	1	0	1	13	11	+2
3	Italy	3	3	0	1	0	1	1	9	12	-3
4	France	3	3	0	0	2	1	0	9	10	-1

== December session ==
=== Danzig Tournament ===
The tournament was played in Danzig, Poland from December 13–15, 2002. It was won by Latvia.

	Team	Pts	GP	W	OTW	T	OTL	L	GF	GA	Diff
1	Latvia	6	3	3	0	0	0	0	15	3	+12
2	Denmark	4	3	2	0	0	0	1	10	6	+4
3	Poland	2	3	1	0	0	0	2	8	6	+2
4	Netherlands	0	3	0	0	0	0	3	4	22	-18

=== Kyiv Tournament ===
The tournament was played in Kyiv, Ukraine from December 13–15, 2002. It was won by Belarus.

	Team	Pts	GP	W	OTW	T	OTL	L	GF	GA	Diff
1	Belarus	6	3	3	0	0	0	0	23	9	+14
2	Ukraine	4	3	2	0	0	0	1	16	4	+12
3	Hungary	2	3	1	0	0	0	2	9	14	-5
4	Great Britain	0	3	0	0	0	0	3	5	26	-18

=== Bled Tournament ===
The tournament was played in Bled, Slovenia from December 13–15, 2002. It was won by France.

	Team	Pts	GP	W	OTW	T	OTL	L	GF	GA	Diff
1	France	6	3	3	0	0	0	0	16	2	+14
2	Slovenia	4	3	2	0	0	0	1	13	8	+5
3	Norway	2	3	1	0	0	0	2	4	13	-9
4	Croatia	0	3	0	0	0	0	3	1	25	-24

== February session ==
=== Villach Tournament ===
The tournament was played in Villach, Austria from February 7–9, 2003. It was won by Austria.

	Team	Pts	GP	W	OTW	T	OTL	L	GF	GA	Diff
1	Austria	4	3	1	0	2	0	0	14	9	+5
2	Italy	4	3	1	0	2	0	0	8	7	+1
3	Slovenia	3	3	1	0	1	0	1	8	7	+1
4	Great Britain	1	3	0	0	1	0	2	6	13	-7

=== Minsk Tournament ===
The tournament was played in Minsk, Belarus from February 7–9, 2003. It was won by Belarus.

	Team	Pts	GP	W	OTW	T	OTL	L	GF	GA	Diff
1	Belarus	5	3	2	0	1	0	0	12	7	+5
2	Latvia	4	3	2	0	0	0	1	6	7	-1
3	France	2	3	1	0	0	0	2	4	5	-1
4	Hungary	1	3	0	0	1	0	2	7	10	-3

=== Odense Tournament ===
The tournament was played in Odense, Denmark from February 7–9, 2003. It was won by Denmark

	Team	Pts	GP	W	OTW	T	OTL	L	GF	GA	Diff
1	Denmark	6	3	2	1	0	0	0	10	5	+5
2	Ukraine	3	3	1	0	1	1	0	14	10	+4
3	Norway	3	3	1	0	1	0	1	11	13	-2
4	Poland	0	3	0	0	1	0	2	8	15	-7

== General classification ==
	Team	Pts	GP	W	OTW	T	OTL	L	GF	GA	Diff
1	Belarus	21	12	10	0	1	0	1	59	27	+32
2	Latvia	19	12	9	0	1	0	2	48	25	+23
3	Denmark	18	12	6	2	2	0	1	35	26	+9
4	Ukraine	15	12	6	0	2	1	3	50	24	+26
5	France	13	12	5	0	2	1	4	33	27	+6
6	Norway	13	12	6	0	1	0	4	41	36	+5
7	Slovenia	13	12	5	0	3	0	4	36	32	+4
8	Austria	8	6	3	0	2	0	1	23	17	+6
9	Poland	8	12	4	0	0	0	8	33	32	+1
10	Italy	7	9	1	1	2	2	3	23	29	-6
11	Hungary	6	12	2	0	2	0	8	26	41	-15
12	Great Britain	4	12	1	0	2	0	9	21	63	-42
13	Netherlands	2	6	0	1	0	0	5	10	37	-27
14	Croatia	0	3	0	0	0	0	3	1	25	-24
