= Raymond Gafner =

Swiss ice hockey player and IOC member

- Born: 17 February 1915 Lausanne, Switzerland
- Died: 26 November 2002 (aged 87)
- Position: Goaltender
- Caught: Left
- NL-A team: Lausanne HC
- National team: Switzerland
- NHL draft: Undrafted
- Playing career: 1938–1944

Raymond Gafner
Medal record

Men's ice hockey
	Pierre de Coubertin medal	1999

Raymond Gafner (17 February 1915 – 26 November 2002) was an ice hockey player, referee, and a member of the IOC between 1969 and 1990.

== Biography ==
Raymond Gafner was born in Lausanne, Switzerland in 1915. From 1931 on, he studied Law, after which he was director of the local hospital from 1954 until 1974 and of the university hospital until 1980. From 1942 until 1950, he was the chief scout of Lausanne and Switzerland's biggest scout group "La Brigade de Sauvabelin". He was a hockey and ice hockey goaltender in the premier Swiss league and later an international ice hockey referee, and was the president of the Swiss Ice Hockey Federation from 1945 until 1951, celebrating the bronze medal at the World Championships in 1950. He became a member of the Swiss Olympic Committee in 1947 and was the president of the Committee from 1965 until 1985. He was a member of the International Olympic Committee from 1969 until 1990, when he became an honorary member, and is one of the founders of the Olympic Museum in Lausanne in 1993. He died in 2002 after a prolonged disease.

Gafner was also known as a writer, publishing 6 sport related books between 1983 and 1993.

== Awards ==
- 1983: Credit Suisse Sports Award (main Swiss sports Award, six categories each year)
- 1983: Prix du Mérite sportif lausannois (biannual sports award of the city of Lausanne)
- 1992: Flambeau d'Or des PCI (Four-yearly award of the International Panathlon organisation)
- 1999: The Pierre de Coubertin Medal (highest award of the IOC) "pays tribute to those who, through their teaching, research and writing of Intellectual works, have contributed to the promotion of Olympism in the spirit of Pierre de Coubertin"
