= Japan Ice Hockey Federation =

Governing body of ice hockey in Japan

Japan
- Association name: Japan Ice Hockey Federation
- IIHF Code: JPN
- IIHF membership: January 26, 1930
- President: Akihisa Mizuno
- IIHF men's ranking: 24rd
- IIHF women's ranking: 6th

The Japan Ice Hockey Federation (Japanese: 日本アイスホッケー連盟) is the governing body of ice hockey in Japan. Japan was the first Asian nation to join the International Ice Hockey Federation (IIHF).

== National teams ==
- Men
- Men U20
- Men U18
- Women
- Women U18

== Notable executives ==
- Tsutomu Kawabuchi: member of the IIHF Hall of Fame.
- Isao Kataoka:recipient of the Paul Loicq Award.
- Shoichi Tomita: vice-president of the IIHF.
- Yoshiaki Tsutsumi: member of the IIHF Hall of Fame.

== 2018 Japan qualification ==
Event	Division	Host nation	Date	Result
Men	Div. IB	Lithuania	22–28 April 2018	
Men U20	Div. IIA	Great Britain	10–16 December 2017	
Men U18	Div. IB	Ukraine	14–20 April 2018	
Women U18	Div. IA	Italy	8–14 January 2018	

Olympic Winter Games

Event	Host nation	Date	Result
Women	South Korea	9–25 February 2018	6th

Note: The 2018 IIHF Women's World Championship in the top division is not played during the Olympic seasons. The 2019 IIHF Women's World Championship will be played in Finland, city and dates to be announced.

== 2017 Japan participation ==
Event	Division	Host nation	Date	Result
Men	Div. IB	Great Britain	23–29 April 2017	Silver medal (24th overall)
Men U20	Div. IIA	Estonia	11–17 December 2016	Silver medal (24th overall)
Men U18	Div. IB	Slovenia	15–21 April 2017	Bronze medal (19th overall)
Women	Div. IA	Austria	15–21 April 2017	Gold medal (9th overall)
Women U18	Top	Czech Republic	7–14 January 2017	Relegated to Div. IA 2018 (8th overall)
