= Juraj Okoličány =

Slovak ice hockey referee and ice hockey administrator (1943–2008)

- Born: 28 March 1943; Žilina, Slovak Republic
- Died: 10 September 2008 (aged 65); Bratislava, Slovakia
- Occupation: Ice hockey referee
- Years active: 1962–1986
- Known for: IIHF supervisor of officials; Slovak Ice Hockey Federation executive; Slovakia men's national ice hockey team manager
- Awards: Paul Loicq Award

Juraj Okoličány (28 March 1943 – 10 September 2008) was a Slovak ice hockey referee and ice hockey administrator. He officiated from 1962 to 1986, including games in the Czechoslovak First Ice Hockey League, IIHF World Junior Championships, and Ice Hockey World Championships. He served as an executive with the Slovak Ice Hockey Federation from 1990 to 2003, where he developed officials, translated rules into Slovak, and directed the organizing committee when Slovakia hosted international events. He was also the manager of the Slovakia men's national ice hockey team from 1993 to 1998. He served as a committee member of the International Ice Hockey Federation (IIHF) from 1993 to 2008, and was a supervisor of officials at World Championships and Winter Olympic Games. His contributions to the IIHF and international ice hockey were recognized in 2008 when he received the Paul Loicq Award.

== Early life ==
Okoličány was born 28 March 1943, in Žilina, Czechoslovakia. He graduated from secondary school in Žilina in 1960, then finished a two-year audiovisual program at an engineering school in Bratislava. He completed basic military service from 1962 to 1964, then worked as an audio engineer and as a technician at Charles University.

Okoličány played hockey as a defenceman for Dynamo Žilina from 1957 to 1961, and with Dukla Bratislava during his military service. He retired from playing for health reasons.

== Officiating career ==
Okoličány had a career as an ice hockey referee for 26 years from 1962 to 1986. He made his professional referee debut at age 19, and was the youngest official in the Czechoslovak First Ice Hockey League. His first match was in Brno between the home team ZKL Brno, and visitors Spartak Moravia Olomouc. He worked for 15 seasons in the Czechoslovak First Ice Hockey League, and was ranked among the top officials in 11 of those 15 seasons. He officiated internationally from 1973 to 1985, and was chosen to work at four IIHF World Junior Championships, and two Ice Hockey World Championships B-division tournaments.

== Coaching career ==
Okoličány had a brief career as an ice hockey coach from 1988 to 1992, after retiring as a referee. He coached Slovak youth teams in Trenčín and Topoľčany, and later worked youth teams in Spain.

== Slovak national hockey ==
Okoličány became chairman of the Slovak Ice Hockey Federation in 1990, and served a chair of the youth commission. Later that same year, he was put in charge of the referee committee, taught referee courses, translated the International Ice Hockey Federation (IIHF) ice hockey rules into the Slovak language, and nominated Vladimír Baluška for international refereeing duties with the IIHF. When Prague and Bratislava co-hosted the 1992 Men's World Ice Hockey Championships, Okoličány participated in planning for hosting games in Bratislava, and proposed upgrades to the arena. In December 1992, Ján Mitošinka was elected as the new chairman, who in turn nominated Okoličány as vice-president of the Slovak Ice Hockey Federation. From 1993 to 2003, Okoličány directed the organizing committee when Slovakia hosted 12 IIHF competitions.

Okoličány was the manager of the Slovakia men's national ice hockey team at the 1993 Olympic qualification. Slovakia won the event, and Okoličány went on to manage the team for ice hockey at the 1994 Winter Olympics, the 1996 Men's World Ice Hockey Championships, the 1997 Men's World Ice Hockey Championships and ice hockey at the 1998 Winter Olympics. In a 2008 interview, he said that "I have worked with Art Berglund since 1993, when we appeared as Slovakia on the national hockey map. He was one of those who supported us. It was not easy to get to the Olympic qualifiers, or to organize the IIHF competitions with us".

== IIHF administrator ==
Okoličány was part of the IIHF's junior committee from 1993 to 1998, and a member of the IIHF's referee committee from 1998 to 2008. During this time, he was a supervisor of officials and a video goal judge during ten Ice Hockey World Championships, the 2002 Winter Olympics and 2006 Winter Olympics, and 45 other IIHF competitions. He was recognized as an authority on the interpretation and development of the ice hockey rules.

Okoličány and the referee committee were responsible for performance of the officials at IIHF events. He described his duties as working from 7:00 a.m. to 11:00 p.m. during events; which included analyzing previous matches, evaluating officials and correcting mistakes, and planning which officials referee future matches. He stated that new referees were rarely chosen for the championship final, and his goal was to prepare officials for future Winter Olympic Games.

== Honors and awards ==
Okoličány's career as an official was recognized when he was awarded the IIHF Referee Gold Badge. In May 2008, Okoličány was honored with the Paul Loicq Award, presented for "special contributions to the IIHF and international ice hockey". He received the award during the IIHF Hall of Fame induction ceremony at the 2008 IIHF World Championship in Quebec City. He was the first Slovak to win the award, and his acceptance speech noted the great satisfaction he felt to receive the award during the IIHF's 100th anniversary celebrations in Canada. He also credited his wife for supporting while he was away for 130 days per year at seven to eight tournaments.

== Death and legacy ==
Okoličány died on 10 September 2008, in Bratislava, due to complications from surgery. He had lived most of his life in Bratislava at the time of his death. His remains were cremated and his funeral was attended by René Fasel on behalf of the IIHF.

Fasel said in memoriam, "The entire international ice hockey family is devastated by Juraj's death. It feels like it was just yesterday that we celebrated his accomplishments in Quebec City. He was a person that was simply there, at every World Championship, at every Olympics, working tirelessly for the good of the sport". Ice Hockey Federation of Russia president Vladislav Tretiak referred to Okoličány as "a great caliber professional who lived with hockey and was always devoted to sports". Czechoslovak national player Jozef Golonka stated, "I met him as one of the best Czechoslovak referees and was a real top. For many years he has been a member of the IIHF at the Referee Committee, and only a well-trained person can do it. I believe it is a great loss not only for Slovak, but also for Czechoslovak hockey and for the IIHF. because he was the one who had everything the referees had to say under the thumb, he was the man who could get the best out of every referee, and he was a very strong man and he could always assert himself".

Okoličány is the namesake of the Juraj Okoličány Award, given annually to the best referee in the Slovakia.

== Family ==
Juraj Okoličány was the fourth generation of a notable Slovak hockey family formerly named Okolicsányiovci, originating from the town of Liptovský Mikuláš. His great-grandfather Albert was the patriarch of the family, worked as a notary and organized hockey at universities in Slovakia. Juraj's grandfather Nicholas moved the family to Bratislava, and organized hockey in the Slovak capital. Juraj's father Vojtech was a referee at the World Championships and the Winter Olympic Games, was a founder of the Slovak Ice Hockey Federation, and was inducted into the Slovak Hockey Hall of Fame in 2003.

Okoličány postponed his wedding for half a year at the wishes of his father, due to the death of his father's brother Otto. After the six months, Okoličány married Elena Pešková, an administrative worker from Bratislava. His son Martin won a Slovak championship playing hockey in Ružinov, but decided against a career as a referee to the disappointment of his father.

== Bibliography ==
- Holko, Ján (2013). Príbeh hokejového rodu Okoličány (PDF) (in Slovak). Slovak Olympic Museum. ISBN 978-80-970816-4-5. Archived from the original (PDF) on 22 July 2017.
