= Michael Hwang =

Singaporean barrister and arbitrator

Michael Hwang SC
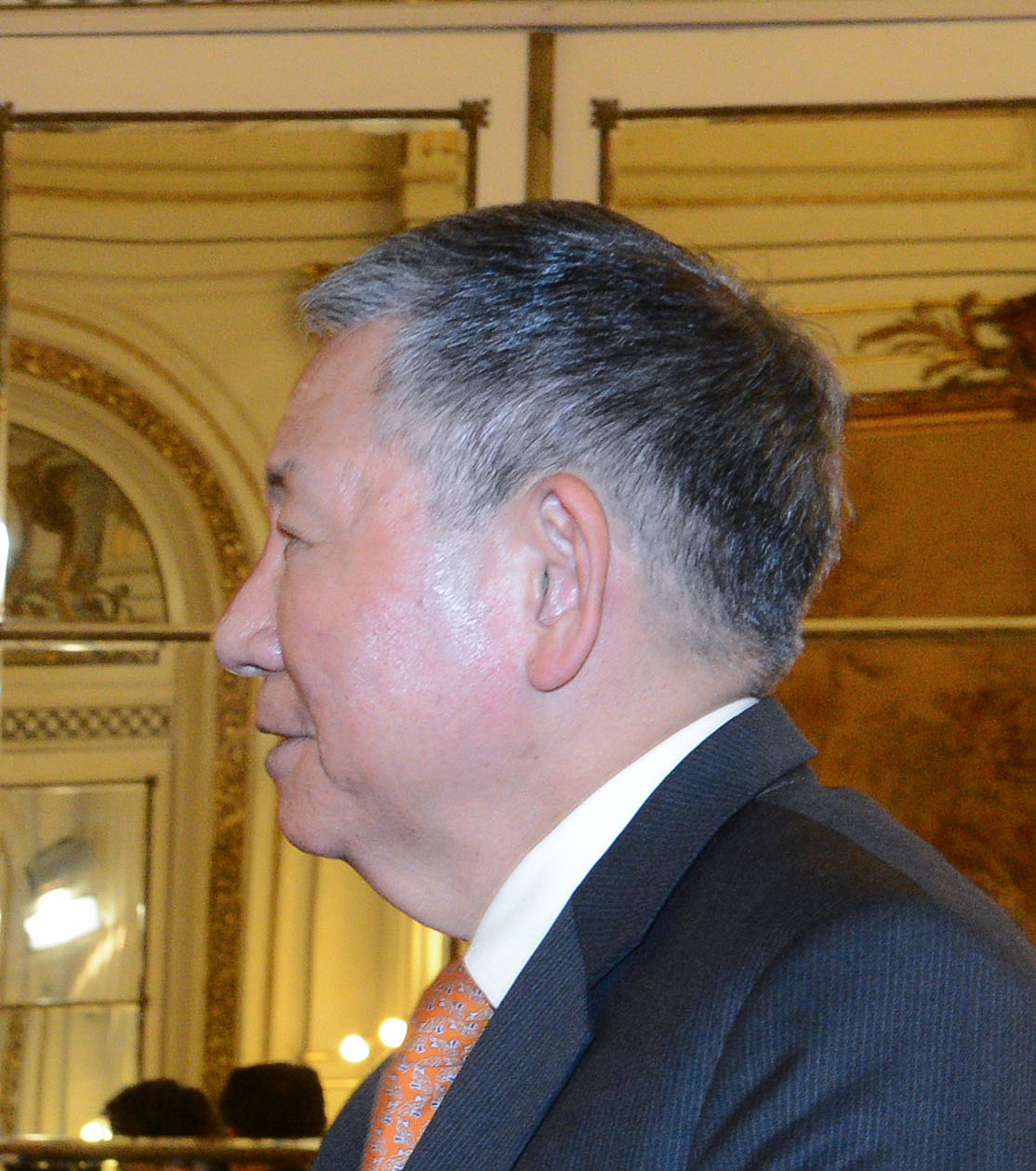
- Hwang in 2016
- Born: Singapore
- Occupation: lawyer
- Years active: 1968–present

Michael Hwang SC is a Singaporean lawyer and arbitrator. In 1991, he was appointed Judicial Commissioner of the Supreme Court of Singapore. He completed his term in 1992, and in 1997 he was appointed one of the first eight Senior Counsel in Singapore. From 2008 to 2010, he was the President of the Law Society of Singapore. In 2010, he became the Chief Justice of the Dubai International Financial Centre Courts.

In 2014, he was awarded the Pierre de Coubertin Medal by the International Olympic Committee for his work with the International Council of Arbitration for Sports, which operates the Court of Arbitration for Sport.
