= George Hirthler =

American writer

- Occupation: Writer
- Years active: 1989–present

George Hirthler is an American writer. He is best known for writing the novel The Idealist, published by Ringworks Press. His novel earned him the Pierre de Coubertin Medal from the International Olympic Committee.

Hirthler began researching the Olympic Games in 1989. In 2016, he wrote the novel The Idealist, based on Pierre de Coubertin, published by Ringworks Press. On June 23, 2022, he was given the Pierre de Coubertin Medal along with Rolf Lukaschewski, a neo-expressionist painter.
