= Michael Payne (executive) =

English-Irish marketing executive and author (born 1958)

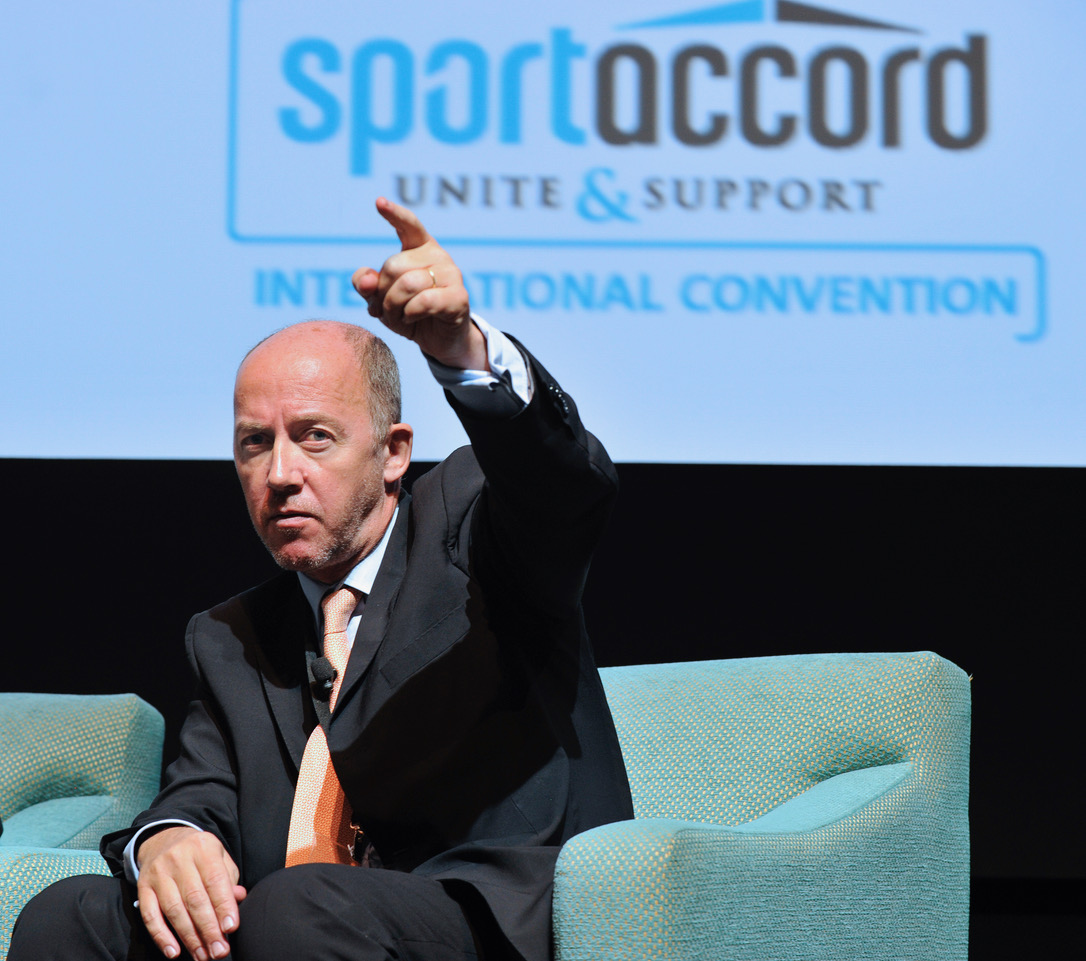
- Born: 25 March 1958 (age 68); London, United Kingdom
- Occupation: Sports Business Leader
- Known for: Director of Marketing at the IOC. Author Sports Business Books.
- Website: michaelrpayne.com

Michael Robert Payne (born 25 March 1958) is an English and Irish marketing executive and author. Nominated by Advertising Age, as one of the world's 50 most influential marketeers for many years head of the marketing division of the International Olympic Committee (IOC) and from 2004 through 2016 with Formula One Group. He is the author of the 2005 book Olympic Turnaround, the 2021 book Toon In!, and his autobiography, Fast Tracks and Dark Deals, published in 2025. He contributes widely to the media on sports business issues. From 2025 on, Chairman of VolleyballWorld.

== Biography ==
Payne was educated at Highgate School. A British free-style skiing champion in 1970s, he began marketing his fellow athletes, helping them find sponsors to permit them to compete. Payne was drafted into the IOC in the 1989, having previously worked at ISL Marketing, a Swiss based marketing company that in 1982 had been appointed by the IOC to develop a global marketing program. During his 17 years with the IOC, he contributed to the development of a multi-billion marketing program for the organisation, worldwide. According to media outlets, Payne is "credited with turning the Games into a financial success" through the television and marketing deals he negotiated for the Olympics during his tenure.

After the 2004 Summer Olympics, he took a position with Bernie Ecclestone, who held until 2017 the commercial rights for the Formula One brand. He remained an advisor for the IOC.

In 2004 Payne also founded his global strategic advisory group, Payne Sports Media Strategies, advising governments, corporations, broadcaster and sports organisations, including Formula One, Alibaba, WPP, CVC amongst others.

Payne also acted as senior advisor for the winning Olympic bids of London 2012, Rio de Janeiro 2016 and Los Angeles 2028.

In 2005 Payne released his first book, Olympic Turnaround that details how the Olympics stepped back from the brink of extinction to become the world's best known brand and a multi billion global franchise. The book has been published in more than 15 different languages.

In 2021 Payne released his second book, Toon In!, that in 2022 won the Sunday Times Sports Book of the Year Award, detailing the Olympic history through cartoons and how the Games have defied threats. All profits were donated to charity – Back Up, Sport for Peace, Yunus Sports Hub and Cartooning for Peace.

In 2025 his autobiographical third book, 'Fast Tracks and Dark Deals', was published by Chiselbury Publishing, to worldwide critical acclaim. The Financial Times described it as “An insider’s account of more than five decades at the intersection of sport, commerce and politics.”

Payne has also written for newspapers including the Financial Times, Yomuiri Shimbun (Japan) and Forbes. He has interviewed for over 100 media outlets including television news programmes in the US (NBC, CNN) UK (BBC, Newsnight, Panorama) Canada (CBC) Australia (Channel 7) Japan (NHK, TV Tokyo) China (CCTV) and Bloomberg, New York Times, Wall St Journal, The Guardian, Sunday Times, L'Equipe, AP, AFP, Reuters amongst others where he is frequently called upon to comment on the business of sport and politics and sport. He is also a regular speaker at international conferences.

He has served on a number of boards including advisory board to Imperial College London; Chairman of Crystal Digital International. In May 2025, Michael Payne was appointed Chairman of Volleyball World – the global business arm of the sport of Volleyball – a joint venture between FIVB and venture capital CVC.

In December 2022, the IOC awarded Michael Payne, the Pierre de Coubertin Medal for services to the Olympic Movement. Only awarded usually to one recipient per year, previous honorees include Dr, Henry Kissinger, Emil Zatopek, Juan Antonio Samaranch and Prince Rainier of Monaco.

The British Swiss Chamber of Commerce in April 2026, nominated Michael Payne as one of 25 legends, who have contributed to British Swiss business and politrical relations. Other nominees, included Lord Norman Foster, Cesar Ritz, Sir Henry Lunn, Claude Nobbs and Edward Whymper.
