= Vsevolod Kukushkin =

Russian journalist, writer and ice hockey administrator (born 1942)

- Born: 3 May 1942 (age 84); Biysk, Russian SFSR, Soviet Union
- Education: Moscow Power Engineering Institute
- Occupations: Journalist, writer and ice hockey administrator
- Years active: 1966 to present
- Known for: International ice hockey writing
- Awards: Paul Loicq Award (2000)

Vsevolod Vladimirovich Kukushkin (Russian: Всеволод Владимирович Кукушкин; born 3 May 1942) is a Russian journalist, writer and ice hockey administrator. He has written for Komsomolskaya Pravda, TASS, RIA Novosti and Sport Express. He traveled with the Soviet Union national ice hockey team as both a journalist and translator, and reported on ice hockey at the Olympic Games, the Ice Hockey World Championships and Canada Cup tournaments. His other work includes published books and television screenplays. As an ice hockey administrator he sat on International Ice Hockey Federation (IIHF) committees, and acted as a press secretary for the Russian Superleague and its successor the Kontinental Hockey League. He received the Paul Loicq Award in 2000 from the IIHF for contributions to international ice hockey.

== Early life ==
Kukushkin was born on 3 May 1942, in Biysk, Russian SFSR, Soviet Union. His love for ice hockey began as a boy playing ball hockey. He developed an appreciation for goaltenders by playing the position in school, and his understanding of the inherent physical demands and frequent injuries. He learned the English language as a young adult on the advice of his parents, and wanted to become a journalist. His father, a writer of Soviet literature under the pseudonym Vladimir Nikolaev, urged his son to study mechanical engineering in case a journalism career failed. Kukushkin followed that advice and graduated from Moscow Power Engineering Institute in 1965.

== Journalism and writing career ==
Kukushkin began his career in sports journalism becoming a member of the Union of Journalists of the Russian Federation in 1966, and then a member of the International Sports Press Association in 1969. He was originally a freelancer and a correspondent for Komsomolskaya Pravda, before he worked at TASS for 22 years. He later worked for RIA Novosti and Sport Express. Canadian journalist Matthew Fisher and The Hockey News have referred to Kukushkin as the "dean of European hockey writers". He has published books in addition to reporting on ice hockey, and written screenplays for television documentaries on sports, ice hockey and popular science.

Kukushkin's career includes reporting on ice hockey at the Olympic Games from 1968 to 2002, each Ice Hockey World Championships in the same time frame, and every Canada Cup tournament played. Due to his knowledge of English, he traveled with the Soviet Union national ice hockey team as both a reporter and translator. He had access to the team's locker room and the opportunity to speak directly with the players and be part of their daily life. Kukushkin translated early discussions for the event which became the 1972 Summit Series. He was present at the 1972 Izvestia Cup when Alan Eagleson and John Ziegler Jr. made the suggestions to Andrey Starovoytov, the general secretary of the Soviet Union Ice Hockey Federation.

Kukushkin authored books on the Canada Cup tournaments, and Soviet national team coach Viktor Tikhonov. Kukushkin's book The Red Machine revealed that the nickname for the Soviet national team came into usage during the 1983 Super Series, when a headline in a Minneapolis newspaper headline read "The Red Machine rolled down on us". The Soviet national team was succeeded by the Russia men's national ice hockey team after the breakup of the Soviet Union. When the new national team struggled in 1994, Kukushkin said that "The people are upset. Russia is a nation of critics." He reported that the Russian team was struggling with finances to support training, no funding was received from the national level, and professional teams in Russia were struggling to stay afloat. He also reported that the Russian people were upset at losing the nation's best players to the National Hockey League (NHL), and not playing on the Russian national team.

== Ice hockey administrator ==
Kukushkin sat on International Ice Hockey Federation (IIHF) committees which included the championship bid committee and the IIHF Hall of Fame committee from 1998 to 2003, the evaluation committee and the IIHF Hall of Fame committee from 2003 to 2008, and the strategic consulting group from 2013 to 2016.

He also served as the press secretary for the Russian Superleague. He stated that NHL players were attracted to playing in Russia before the 2004–05 NHL lockout happened, and that Russian team owners were spending more on salaries. He noted that taxation in Russia was favorable to expatriate players, and expected the trend to continue despite uncertain profitability.

Kukushkin and Ice Hockey Federation of Russia president Vladislav Tretiak participated in discussions with NHL representatives Gary Bettman and Donald Fehr, for a potential 2007 revival of the Summit Series. He commented that the event was profit-driven by ticket sales and broadcasting rights, but noted that Russian players wanted to participate for pride rather than just money. He was surprised that original proposals were discussed by René Fasel of the IIHF and Bob Nicholson of Hockey Canada. Ultimately the 2007 Super Series was arranged using junior players, and coincided with the IIHF's 100th anniversary.

In 2008, the Russian Superleague was reorganized into the Kontinental Hockey League (KHL). Kukushkin remained in his advisory role, and stated that "we see the league as a challenge to the NHL in the future". He felt the 2011 Lokomotiv Yaroslavl plane crash would deter players from the KHL, stating it was "a horrible blow and a colossal loss for the league", and suggested more diligence by teams in chartering flights. In 2015, he cautioned against the KHL expanding due to a lack of good players. He instead suggested the KHL be divided into three levels based on play ability, and stated "we shouldn't copy the NHL, because sometimes the copy becomes a parody, and it doesn't do any good".

Kukushkin is part of the selection committee for the Russian Hockey Hall of Fame as of 2016.

== Awards ==
Kukushkin was made a laureate of the International and All-Union Sports Film Festivals in 1972. He received the Paul Loicq Award in 2000 from the IIHF for contributions to international ice hockey. He was the third recipient of the award, and the first Russian. He stated that he was very surprised to be honored with the award, which he received at the IIHF Hall of Fame induction ceremony at the 2000 IIHF World Championship hosted in Saint Petersburg, Russia.
