= Kent Angus =

Canadian businessman (1952–2021)

- Born: July 31, 1952; Toronto, Ontario, Canada
- Died: April 24, 2021 (aged 68); Toronto, Ontario, Canada
- Education: Sheridan College
- Occupations: Ice hockey team uniform and apparel supplier
- Years active: 1995 to 2019
- Employer: Nike, Inc.
- Known for: International Ice Hockey Federation team jerseys
- Awards: Paul Loicq Award

Calvin Kent Angus (July 31, 1952 – April 24, 2021) was a Canadian businessman. He represented Nike, Inc. as the supplier of team hockey jerseys and other apparel for the International Ice Hockey Federation (IIHF). His work included the supply of uniforms for 49 Ice Hockey World Championships, four Winter Olympic Games, and more than 75,000 hockey jerseys. He received the Paul Loicq Award from the IIHF for contributions to international ice hockey in 2012.

== Early life ==
Calvin Kent Angus was born July 31, 1952, in Toronto, Ontario, Canada. He studied business administration and management at Sheridan College from 1970 to 1972. He later earned his pilot's license, worked in the Air Canada terminal at Toronto Pearson International Airport, and assisted with travel plans for the Canadian national ice hockey teams.

== Career ==
Angus began working for Nike, Inc. hockey operations in June 1995. He was in charge of the contract between the International Ice Hockey Federation (IIHF) and Nike as an official supplier. He coordinated the supply of hockey jerseys and off-ice apparel for teams in the IIHF's top divisions at the Ice Hockey World Championships and the Winter Olympic Games. His work included supplying 49 Ice Hockey World Championships events and four Winter Olympic Games. During that time he supplied the IIHF with more than 75,000 hockey jerseys. He worked directly with IIHF member associations on the design of each national jersey, and was able to customize each jersey at the arena with the player's name and number. His work meant that he was often the first person to arrive and the last to leave at championship events. When National Hockey League (NHL) players participated in the Olympics, he was on call to produce replacement jerseys by the next day for last-minute roster changes due to injuries. For ice hockey at the 2002 Winter Olympics, Angus oversaw a stitching site in Utah where 12 seamstress prepared more than 1,450 uniforms with numbers and players' names.

Angus produced special occasion jerseys for the IIHF centennial celebrations in 2008. These included throwback-style jersey designs for the top-division teams which became popular collector's items. For ice hockey at the 2010 Winter Olympics, he incorporated "discovery pieces" into each jersey for Canada and other countries. Angus felt that the "discovery pieces" which were national motifs and symbols sewn into the jersey design, noticeable at a close distance, was his favourite work. He said that the 2010 Winter Olympics was his busiest time when he produced 1,300 game-quality jerseys, which included complete sets of home and away jerseys for each men's and women's team. He also produced additional jerseys for each NHL player to contribute to charities, which included disaster relief fundraising and the "Hockey for Haiti" program, and online auctions for Olympic memorabilia.

== Later life ==
The IIHF bestowed the Paul Loicq Award on Angus in 2012, in recognition of his contributions to international ice hockey. He was later credited by the Hockey Hall of Fame for donations made to its collection during the 2014–15, and 2016–17 seasons.

Angus retired from Nike in February 2019, later resided in Markham, Ontario, and maintained a cottage on the French River in Ontario. He died at Sunnybrook Health Sciences Centre in Toronto on April 24, 2021.

Canadian broadcaster Gord Miller posthumously described Angus by saying, "His job was tremendously difficult. Keeping all the federations and teams happy was no easy feat, but he did it with professionalism and good humour".
