= Zoltán Kovács (ice hockey) =

Hungarian ice hockey coach and administrator (born 1962)

- Born: 2 January 1962 (age 63); Budapest, Hungarian People's Republic
- Education: BEcon, MPhEd
- Alma mater: Corvinus University of Budapest, Semmelweis University
- Occupation(s): Ice hockey coach and administrator
- Known for: Hungarian Ice Hockey Federation
- Awards: Paul Loicq Award (2020)

Zoltán Kovács (born 2 January 1962) is a Hungarian ice hockey coach and administrator. He joined the Hungarian Ice Hockey Federation as a secretary in 1994, then served as its general secretary from 1998 to 2017, and has served as its vice-president since 2017. He played for the Hungary men's national junior ice hockey team in 1980, and was its manager in 2003 when the team earned promotion to Division I of the IIHF World U20 Championship. He played professionally for Ferencvárosi TC, and sat on several International Ice Hockey Federation (IIHF) committees. The IIHF named Kovács as the 2020 Paul Loicq Award recipient for contributions to international hockey.

== Playing and coaching career ==
Kovács was born on 2 January 1962, in Budapest. He began playing ice hockey with KSI Budapest in 1972. As a defenceman, he won youth championships in the U16 and U18 age groups. He later played for the Hungary men's national under-18 ice hockey team at the 1979 IIHF European U18 Championship and the 1980 IIHF European U18 Championship; and then for the Hungary men's national junior ice hockey team in Pool B of the 1980 World Junior Ice Hockey Championships.

Kovács played hockey professionally from 1980 to 1990 with Ferencvárosi TC in Budapest. He won OB I bajnokság championships in 1984 and 1989, and finished his career playing with Dunaújvárosi Acélbikák. He began coaching the Ferencvárosi TC junior team in 1984 while he was playing on the senior team, and coached the Hungary men's national under-16 team from 1987 to 2000. He later coached for MAC Budapest from 2000 to 2008. Notable players on his teams include Levente Szuper, Balázs Sebők and Krisztián Nagy.

During his coaching career, Kovács completed a Master of Physical Education degree in 1992 at the Faculty of Physical Education and Sport Sciences at Semmelweis University, and later earned a Bachelor of Economics degree from Corvinus University of Budapest.

== Hungarian hockey executive ==
Kovács joined the Hungarian Ice Hockey Federation (MJSZ) as a secretary in 1994, then served as its general secretary from 1998 to 2017, and has served as its vice-president since 2017. As vice-president, he primary role was to strengthen international relations. He stated that one his objectives is to get as many children as possible to start playing hockey. When appointed as general secretary, Hungary had only one indoor ice rink, which was not regulation size for international competition. Under his leadership, Hungary had built 34 rinks as of 2022, with the desire for all counties of Hungary to have an ice rink.

Kovács served as manager of the Hungary men's national junior ice hockey team from 2000 to 2003, and in 2009. During this time, the team won Division II Group B at the 2003 World Junior Ice Hockey Championships, which earned promotion to Division I for the 2004 championships. His development strategy was to produce talent at the youth age groups to supply players for the national junior and national under-18 teams. In coordination with Jon Haukeland and others, Kovács oversaw annual tournaments in the Euro Ice Hockey Challenge for national teams.

In a 2017 interview, Kovács talked about his new vice-president position. He stated that the MJSZ was being transformed to run more like a business, and that his role would be to increase the popularity of hockey in Hungary and include sport diplomacy with other national federations. He became chairman of the technical committee, to develop the men's and women's national teams, and the domestic youth hockey leagues. He arranged for professional Hungarian hockey players to teach skills to youth players, and sought to coordinate competitive youth leagues within Hungary and Austria. He wants to see new arenas built in each county of Hungary to host top-level hockey, and to provide new clubs with equipment and coaching mentors. He felt his greatest success was having the Canada men's national ice hockey team play to a sold-out crowd in the László Papp Budapest Sports Arena and showcase National Hockey League talent to Hungarians. He wants Hungary to host the top level of the Ice Hockey World Championships.

In 2021, Kovács was named vice-president of professional affairs for the MJSZ, which chose a development strategy to change attitudes in young people by "sustainability, succession, effectiveness and popularity". In a 2022 interview, he was most proud of organizing international ice hockey competitions in Hungary every year since 1998, and stated a desire for Hungary to qualify to play in ice hockey at the Olympic Games. During his tenure as vice-president, the Hungary men's national ice hockey team qualified for the top tier of the 2023 IIHF World Championship after a 71-year absence. He also signed a two-year contract with the Canada men's national team to visit Hungary in 2023 and 2024, for exhibition games and training camps.

=== IIHF committee member ===
Kovács served as a member of the International Ice Hockey Federation (IIHF) recruitment committee from 2010 to 2012, and the ice rink committee from 2016 to 2020. He was named to the event and championships committee for the 2021–2026 term. His recent committee work has included revisions to the IIHF World Championships, and development of three-on-three (3x3) hockey, which first appeared in ice hockey at the 2020 Winter Youth Olympics.

== Honors ==
The IIHF named Kovács as the 2020 Paul Loicq Award recipient, for "outstanding contributions to the IIHF and international ice hockey". The formal presentation was scheduled for the 2020 IIHF World Championship in Zürich, but was delayed until the 2022 IIHF World Championship due to the COVID-19 pandemic. He is the first Hungarian to be named a recipient of the award. (Note: The list of previous Paul Loicq Award recipients from 1998 to 2018, and 2019, does not include any Hungarians.) In response to the award he said, "I am the winner, but the recognition goes to those who have worked for the last 25 years in the development of Hungarian hockey".
