= Isao Kataoka =

Japanese ice hockey administrator (1936–2015)

- Isao Kataoka (center) during the 2008 IIHF World Championship Division I Group B in Sapporo.
- Born: 12 July 1936; Sapporo, Hokkaido, Japan
- Died: 9 December 2015 (aged 79); Sapporo, Hokkaido, Japan
- Education: Chuo University
- Known for: Japan Ice Hockey Federation
- Awards: Paul Loicq Award (2001); Order of the Rising Sun (2008)

Isao Kataoka (Japanese: 片岡 勲; 12 July 1936 – 9 December 2015) was a Japanese ice hockey administrator. He served as the executive director and the vice-president of the Japan Ice Hockey Federation and was president of the Hokkaido Ice Hockey Federation. He worked with the International Ice Hockey Federation (IIHF) in the planning and hosting of its tournaments in Japan, including the 1972 Winter Olympics and the 1998 Winter Olympics. He received the Paul Loicq Award in 2001 for contributions to the IIHF and promoting international ice hockey.

== Early life ==
Kataoka was born 12 July 1936 in Sapporo. He graduated from Hokkai High School, then attended Chuo University in Tokyo. He played the forward position in university ice hockey on the first line, but quit playing due to family circumstances and became a student committee member.

== Career ==
Kataoka began an ice hockey career by managing Tokyo Metropolitan Ice Hockey Federation university leagues. Returning to Sapporo, he became executive director and the vice-president of the Japan Ice Hockey Federation. He played an integral role in the planning and execution of International Ice Hockey Federation (IIHF) tournaments hosted in Japan. During his time with the Japan Ice Hockey Federation, the country hosted the 1972 Winter Olympics in Sapporo and the 1998 Winter Olympics in Nagano. He served as the chairman of ice hockey at the 1998 Winter Olympics, the first Olympics to include active National Hockey League players, and the first to include a women's tournament.

The IIHF credited Kataoka's "experience and knowledge of the game of ice hockey" for his effective management of these events, as well as his attention to detail in preparing facilities for the participants. The IIHF further stated that "Kataoka's enthusiasm and aspiring attitude in the development of ice hockey administrators and officials of the next generation was greatly appreciated and respected by the ice hockey family in and outside of Japan". In 2001, Kataoka received the Paul Loicq Award for contributions to the IIHF and promoting international ice hockey, the first Japanese person to receive the award.

The Japan Ice Hockey Federation reported its 2004 fiscal year with a deficit exceeding ¥17,500,000, primarily due to expenses for ice hockey events at the 2004 Japan Winter Games being held separately from ice skating for the first time. Kataoka was concerned that similar problems may happen again, stating "we cannot afford to interrupt the national sports for the sake of the spread of the sport".

Kataoka remained involved with Japanese international sports and served as the head of mission for the Japanese delegation at the 2005 Winter Universiade at Innsbruck, overseeing 154 athletes, 100 players, 41 officials, and 13 additional officials. On 12 May 2008, he received the Order of the Rising Sun.

As chairman of the Sapporo Ice Hockey Federation, Kataoka oversaw programs for leadership training, referee training, athletic improvement, the Sapporo Games, promoting inline hockey, and overseas exchange programs. In November 2010, he was appointed the third president of the Hokkaido Ice Hockey Federation, succeeding Tsutomu Kawabuchi. Kataoka served as an advisor to the Japanese Ice Hockey Federation. After the 2011 Tōhoku earthquake and tsunami devastated areas in the Sendai region of Japan, he was part of the ceremonies to remember the disaster. Donations were collected during the 2012 Japan ice hockey championships, and he presented the funds raised to the Sendai Lady Rabbits team.

== Later life ==
Kataoka died from lung cancer on 9 December 2015, in Sapporo.
