= Panathlon International =

- Formation: 1960
- Type: Sports organization
- Headquarters: Rapallo
- Official language: English, French
- President: (Switzerland) Pierre Zappelli
- Website: panathlon-international.org

Panathlon International (PI) is a global umbrella organization of "Panathlon clubs", which are nonprofit non-governmental organizations promoting sports ethics and fair play and opposing discrimination and politicisation in sport. Panathalon International is recognized by the International Olympic Committee (IOC). It is a member of the International Fair Play Committee (CIFP), and associate member of the Global Association of International Sports Federations. The name "Panathlon" is from Greek pan "all" + athlon "sport".

PI has more than 300 clubs in 30 countries in 4 continents, with a head office in Rapallo, Italy. As well as promotional work, PI and its members support research on topics concerning sport and its relations with society.

== History ==
The first club was created on 12 June 1951 in Venice by Mario Viali of the Italian National Olympic Committee and some friends, mostly members of the local Rotary Club. Ludovico Foscari coined the name "Panathlon" and the motto ludis iungit, Latin for "[Panathlon] unites by means of sport". In 1953 seven clubs formed the Italian Panathlon Association. In 1960 Panathlon International was formed by members from Italy, Switzerland, Spain, and France.

As of 12 April 2018, there is no Panathlon International club in the United Kingdom. On that date PI met with the Panathlon Foundation, a UK charity promoting youth disabled sports, to discuss co-operation to enable a UK PI club to use the name "Panathlon".

== Goals ==
As an independent organization, Panathlon aims at:

- Promoting culture and ethics in sport
- Working together with organizations that have the same goals
- Presenting suggestions to handle acute and chronic problems in sport
- Stimulating reflection and discussion on "ethics and integrity" (both values-based and rules-based approaches) in modern sports based on scientific research

== Actions ==
Panathlon's actions on integrity in sport have been fueled by the fact that sport is often beset by poor practice, corruption, and harmful behaviors. Sport has to remain credible and must be continuously proactive if it wants to sustain its positive values. Panathlon is therefore considering what should be done to ensure that the positive potential of sport can prevail in the complex commercialized and globalized sporting landscape of the 21st century. Its position is that it would be naïve to think that sport automatically elicits and promotes positive effects and that remaining silent on obvious aberrations would condone complicity.

A modern integrity management framework aims at preventing serious integrity violations on the one hand (rules-based approach), and promoting integrity through stimulating understanding commitment and capacity for ethical decision-making. On the other hand, PI demonstrates a "values-based approach." To direct its actions, Panathlon International adopts the "values-based approach" which is about supporting and stimulating (code of ethics) and limits itself to stimulate sports federations and sports authorities to address controlling and sanctioning (code of ethics). The Panathlon Declaration of Ethics in Youth Sports adopted by UNICEF, the IOC, SportAccord, international federations (FIFA, UCI, IAAF, FIBA, FIG and others), organizations (ENGSO, EUPEA and others) as well as National Olympic Committees (Belgium, Netherlands, Uruguay and others) exemplifies this "values-based approach."

== Presidents ==
No.	Name	Years
1	Fernando Pozzani	1955–1957
2	Aldo Mairano	1957–1968
3	Saverio Giulini	1968–1972
4	Demetrio Balestra	1972–1976
5	Sisto Favre	1976–1977
6	Paolo Cappabianca	1977–1988
7	Antonio Spallino	1988–1996
8	Vittorio Adorni	1996–2004
9	Enrico Prandi	2004–2012
10	Giacomo Santini	2012–2016
11	Pierre Zappelli	2016-

== Flambeau d'Or ==
The Flambeau d'Or (Golden Torch) is an award that is presented every four years. It aims to reward distinguished international sports personalities. It is awarded in three categories for outstanding achievements in sport promotion, sport culture and organisation.

Past Winners
Year	Promotion	Culture	Organisation
1972	Giulio Onesti	Avery Brundage	Willi Daume
1976	Marc Hodler	Lord Killanin	Juan Antonio Samaranch
1980	Mohamed Mzali	Nikolaos Nissiotis	Beppe Croce
1984	João Havelange	Franco Carraro	Mario Vazquez Rana
1988	Un Yong Kim	Giulio Andreotti	Anselmo Lopez
1992	Jacques Rogge	Raymond Gafner	Pasqual Maragall y Mira
1996	Pelé	Hans Erni	Gerhard Heiberg
2000	Albert II, Prince of Monaco	He Zhenliang	Michael Knight
2004	Sergey Bubka	Bruno Grandi	Gianna Angelopoulos-Daskalaki
2008	Oscar Pistorius	Gudrun Doll-Tepper	Hein Verbruggen
