= Tsutomu Kawabuchi =

Japanese ice hockey player, coach and administrator (1925–2014)

- Born: 16 May 1925; Tomakomai, Hokkaido, Japan
- Died: 19 January 2014 (aged 88); Tomakomai, Hokkaido, Japan
- Education: Rikkyo University
- Known for: Japan Ice Hockey Federation; Japanese Olympic Committee
- Awards: IIHF Hall of Fame

Tsutomu Kawabuchi (Japanese: 河渕 務; 16 May 1925 – 19 January 2014) was a Japanese ice hockey player, coach and administrator. He won Japanese hockey championships as a player and as a coach with Iwakura, and later coached the Japan men's national ice hockey team, and the Japan women's national ice hockey team. He was president of the Hokkaido Ice Hockey Federation for twenty years, and later founded a women's ice hockey club. He served with the Japan Ice Hockey Federation and was involved in organizing the first IIHF Asian Oceanic U18 Championships, and sat on the Japanese Olympic Committee where he played an integral role in introducing women's ice hockey at the Winter Olympic Games. He was recognized for his contributions to international ice hockey with induction into the IIHF Hall of Fame in 2004.

== Early life and club career ==
Kawabuchi was born 16 May 1925, in Tomakomai, Hokkaido. After junior schooling in Tomakomai, he started playing hockey in 1938 and attended Rikkyo University, but later dropped out and served at Karafuto Fortress during World War II. He joined the Iwakura club in 1947, and played on the newly-formed ice hockey team. He won the All Japan Ice hockey Championship as a player in 1957, and later took over as the team's coach in 1959. During his tenure with the team, he played for ten seasons, then coached for another nine seasons, and made Iwakura into a respected club. Under his leadership, the club was champion of the Japan Ice Hockey League in the 1966–67, and 1967–68 seasons.

== Japanese national hockey ==
Kawabuchi also served with the Japan men's national ice hockey team during his time at Iwakura. In 1962, he coached the national team to a gold medal in Group B of the 1962 Ice Hockey World Championships played in Colorado Springs, Colorado. His team won all five games he coached at the tournament, with victories over France, Australia, Austria, Netherlands, and Denmark. He later served as the national team's manager for ice hockey at the 1964 Winter Olympics, where Japan placed third in Group B with four wins, two losses, and one draw.

Kawabuchi later served as president of the Hokkaido Ice Hockey Federation from 1990 to 2010, and became a board member of the Japan Ice Hockey Federation. He also sat on the Japanese Olympic Committee, and worked to build the Japan men's national junior ice hockey team, and the Japan women's national ice hockey team. In 1991, he founded the Iwakura Peregrine women's ice hockey club, which helped develop the female side of the game. In 1992, he was recognized with the Tomakomai City Contribution Award. He was later involved in organizing the inaugural IIHF Asian Oceanic U18 Championships in 1993, and was later a Japanese team leader in ice hockey at the Asian Winter Games. He was succeeded as president of the Hokkaido Ice Hockey Federation by Isao Kataoka in November 2010.

Kawabuchi's role in starting a women's club team, and his efforts as part of the Japanese Olympic Committee, were seen as integral to the first women's ice hockey tournament at the 1998 Winter Olympics in Nagano. He also coached the women's national team at the 1998 Olympic Games, and was the team's coach and manager at the 2004 IIHF Women's World Championship.

== Later life and honors ==
Kawabuchi was recognized for his contributions to international ice hockey with induction into the IIHF Hall of Fame in 2004, in the builder category. He became the second Japanese person inducted into the hall after Yoshiaki Tsutsumi. The Japan Ice Hockey Federation later referred to Kawabuchi as the "father of Japanese women's ice hockey". He died 19 January 2014 at age 88, at the hospital in Tomakomai due to sepsis. His farewell ceremony was scheduled for 23 January, at the Tomakomai City Hall.
