= Bob Nadin =

Canadian ice hockey referee (born 1933)

- Born: March 15, 1933 (age 93); Toronto, Ontario, Canada
- Education: University of Toronto
- Occupations: Ice hockey referee, educator
- Awards: IIHF Hall of Fame; Paul Loicq Award; Pierre de Coubertin Medal

Bob Nadin (born March 15, 1933) is a Canadian retired ice hockey referee and administrator. He refereed at the 1972 Winter Olympics, and served as a referee supervisor for the International Ice Hockey Federation (IIHF), the National Hockey League, and the Canadian Amateur Hockey Association. He was involved with the Winter Olympic Games every Olympiad from 1972 until 2012, and was honoured by the International Olympic Committee with the Pierre de Coubertin Medal. The IIHF honoured Nadin with the Paul Loicq Award, and inducted him into the IIHF Hall of Fame.

== Early life ==
Nadin was born March 15, 1933, in Toronto, Ontario. He attended elementary and high school in Toronto, and graduated from the University of Toronto in 1958, with a degree in physical education.

== Refereeing career ==
Nadin began refereeing ice hockey at the University of Toronto, when he was 17 years old. He was encouraged to officiate by teammates in the interfaculty league, and he said that he enjoyed refereeing more than playing. He later became referee-in-chief of the school league, officiated in the church leagues of Toronto, and moved onto the Ontario Hockey Association (OHA). Nadin later refereed games at the Memorial Cup, Allan Cup, Centennial Cup, approximately 100 international games, and was offered a place in the National Hockey League, but ended up refereeing in the Eastern Hockey League. He twice refereed matches between the Canada men's national ice hockey team and the Soviet Union national ice hockey team at Maple Leaf Gardens, first on January 10, 1967, then on January 19, 1969. Nadin made his debut at an International Ice Hockey Federation (IIHF) event, refereeing seven games at the 1972 Winter Olympics in Sapporo. Later in the same year, he conducted refereeing clinics for Russian ice officials, shortly before the Summit Series took place. Nadin returned to the international stage, refereeing games at the 1974 World Junior Ice Hockey Championships in Leningrad. A few months later, Nadin refereed at the 1974 Memorial Cup in Calgary.

== Supervisor of officials ==
On August 11, 1975, Nadin who was serving as the referee-in-chief of the OHA, was nominated to replace Hugh McLean as the referee-in-chief of the Canadian Amateur Hockey Association (CAHA). Nadin served as referee-in-chief of the CAHA from 1976 to 1986. He created a referee certification program for the CAHA, and wrote casebooks to interpret hockey rules for both the CAHA and the IIHF. He was a member of CAHA rules committee, and helped implement rule changes to reduce injuries from ice hockey sticks, in response to increasing eye injuries. He supported adding sticks to the list of dangerous equipment which referees were allowed to remove from a game. Also for player safety, he supported making face masks mandatory on hockey helmets, and a reduction in physical aggression on the ice.

Nadin was one of the supervisors of officials at 1976 Canada Cup. He has also served as a referee supervisor for Ontario University Athletics, and from 1992 to 1996, was a referee supervisor for the National Hockey League.

In 1976, Nadin joined the IIHF rules and referee committee and was a referee supervisor at each Winter Olympic Games from 1976 until 2012. He travelled worldwide to assist and evaluate officiating crews at IIHF events. He was responsible for writing, updating, and interpreting rules. Nadin said, "The president of the ice hockey federation refers to me as the pope of the rules". He also conducted referee seminars in over 40 countries, and implemented regulations on ice hockey goaltending equipment at IIHF events. He was part of the committee which selected referees for the 1998 Winter Olympics in Nagano, and the 2006 Winter Olympics in Turin. He also supervised officials at the 2011 Asian Winter Games, the 2012 Winter Youth Olympics, the 2013 IIHF World Women's U18 Championship – Division I, the 2013 IIHF World U18 Championships, and the 2017 Asian Winter Games.

== Awards and honours ==
Nadin was named to the OHA referees' honour roll in 1981. He was given the OHA Gold Stick in 1984, in recognition of outstanding service to the game. He was honoured with the Hockey Canada Order of Merit in 1990. Nadin received the Paul Loicq Award in 2007, for outstanding contributions to the IIHF, and international ice hockey. He was named an honorary member of the IIHF officiating committee, in 2010. Nadin received the Pierre de Coubertin Medal in 2012, in recognition of his work in ice hockey at the Winter Olympic Games. He had originally been nominated for the Olympic Order by René Fasel, but received the Coubertin medal instead. Nadin was inducted into the Etobicoke Sports Hall of Fame on November 7, 2013. Prior to the 2017 Asian Winter Games in Sapporo, Nadin received a special ring from René Fasel at a Japanese tea ceremony, in honour of his service to the IIHF, and to commemorate refereeing at the 1972 Winter Olympic in the same location. He was inducted into the IIHF Hall of Fame as a builder, in 2018. As of 2020, he is the only recipient of the Paul Loicq Award to also be inducted into the IIHF Hall of Fame.

== Personal life ==
Nadin resides in Weston, Toronto. He married his wife, Nancy, on April 21, 1962, and they have one son, one daughter, and five grandchildren. He began a teaching career at Weston Collegiate Institute in 1958, and later became head of the physical education department in 1969. He retired in 1994 and had coached football, hockey, baseball, and alpine skiing at the school.

Nadin makes a hobby of stamp collecting, and has hockey-related stamps from around the world. He regularly adds to his collection in his travels, using the Scott catalogue of postage stamps. He also has an extensive collection of lapel pins, mugs, photos, and pennants, and has donated items to the Hockey Hall of Fame resource centre.
