= Norwegian Ice Hockey Association =

Ice hockey governing body in Norway

Norway
- Association name: Norges Ishockeyforbund
- IIHF Code: NOR
- Founded: 18 September 1934
- IIHF membership: 20 January 1935
- President: Tage Pettersen
- IIHF men's ranking: 12 (▼1) (26 May 2025)
- IIHF women's ranking: 11 (▲2) (21 April 2025)

The Norwegian Ice Hockey Association (in Norwegian, Norges Ishockeyforbund (NIHF) is the governing body of all ice hockey, sledge hockey and in-line hockey in Norway.

NIHF has its office at Ullevaal Stadium in Oslo.

The current president is Tage Pettersen, who replaced Gerhard Nilsen in 2018. The current head coach of Team Norway is Petter Thoresen who has coached the team since 2016.

The logo of the NIHF has a polar bear in its centre spot. The national team is also nicknamed Isbjørnene ("The Polar Bears").

== History ==
NIHF was founded September 18, 1934 and has been a member of the International Ice Hockey Federation since January 20, 1935.

The first President of the NIHF was Rolf Gjertsen from the club Trygg. The first vice president was Ludvig Christiansen, also from Trygg. The ten teams that founded the NIHF were: Forward, Furuset, Gjøa, Hasle, Holmen, Strong, Trygg, NTHI, Trond and Trondheim.

The inaugural game was played at Furuset Stadion on January 4, 1935, between Gjøa and Furuset. Gjøa won 5–0. The referee was Johan Narvestad.

Norway has yet to win a medal during its twelve appearances at the Olympic games. Their best result was in 1972 when they finished in 8th place.

In the 1980 Winter Olympics, the team competed in the top division for the first time since 1952. They lost their first four games of the tournament to Czechoslovakia (11–0), West Germany (10–4), USA (5–1) and Sweden (7–1), and then came from behind to tie Romania (3-3) for a point in the standings.

Today, Norway competes in the top tier for the World Championships.

== NIHF Awards ==
The NIHF annually awards the Golden Puck award to the best male Norwegian born hockey player. The similar award for women is the Valemon trophy, which has been awarded twice.

Each year the NIHF hands out the His Rojal Majesty's Cup to the winner of the playoffs of the Eliteserien, and the winning team becomes Norwegian Champions.

=== Polar Bear Trophy ===
The Polar Bear Trophy is an award given out by the federation to Norwegian ice hockey players who have played a minimum of 50 official games for the Norwegian national ice hockey team. Counting as official games are games played at the IIHF World Championships, the Winter Olympics and qualification games to the two aforementioned tournaments. Friendly games are not counted.

Referees who have officiated a minimum of 30 games at the Winter Olympics or IIHF World Championship (Elite and Division 1) at either the senior or the junior level are also eligible for reception.

The NIHF board may also award the trophy to builders who have shown an extra ordinary dedication to Norwegian ice hockey.

== Notable executives ==
- Tore Johannessen, president (1956–1964)
- Jon Haukeland, sport director and general secretary
