= Eric Monnin =

French historian and sociologist

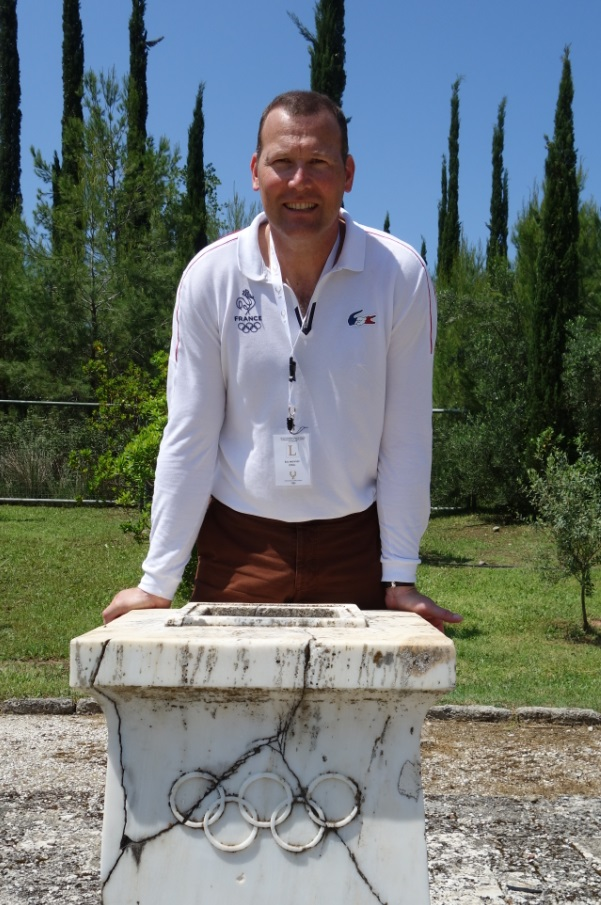
- Born: February 21, 1968 (age 58); Besançon
- Occupation: Sociologist

Éric Monnin (born February 21, 1968, in Besançon (Doubs)) is a French sports historian and sociologist, specializing in the International Olympic Movement. He holds a senior secondary school teaching degree in Physical Education and Sports. He graduated with a PhD in sociology and is a lecturer accredited to conduct research at the University of Franche-Comté. He is a member of the Culture, Sport, Health, Society (C3S) laboratory at the University of Franche-Comté.

== Biography ==
=== Professional background ===
Éric Monnin first taught at the Combelles secondary school in the Haute-Saône department (Besançon academy), at the Georges Politzer secondary school in Seine-et-Marne (Créteil academy), and then at the Sévenans Polytechnic Institute (Ipsé), which became the Belfort-Montbéliard University of Technology (UTBM) in 1999. After completing his PhD entitled ‘L'olympisme: pratiques et représentations en milieu scolaire’ (‘Olympism: practices and representations in the school environment’) directed by Professor Alain Bihr, he was recruited as a lecturer at the University of Franche-Comté. He has also been participating in the teaching of the second year of the professional master's degree and the University Diploma in Sports Law at the Continued Education Center Panthéon - Sorbonne at the University of Paris 1.

In parallel to his university studies, he followed the teachings of Dr. Alfonso Caycedo and Dr. Natalia Caycedo in Andorra and obtained the specialized master's degree in Caycedan sophrology in 2005.

His subject of study, Olympism, has led him on several occasions to organize "Olympic Weeks" in schools and universities, and to follow the preparations for the Olympic Games, particularly in Australia, Greece, China and South Korea. He participated as a speaker in 2010 in Beijing, in the work of the World Union of Olympic Cities (WUOC). He is a regular speaker at the International Olympic Academy (IOA) located in Greece.

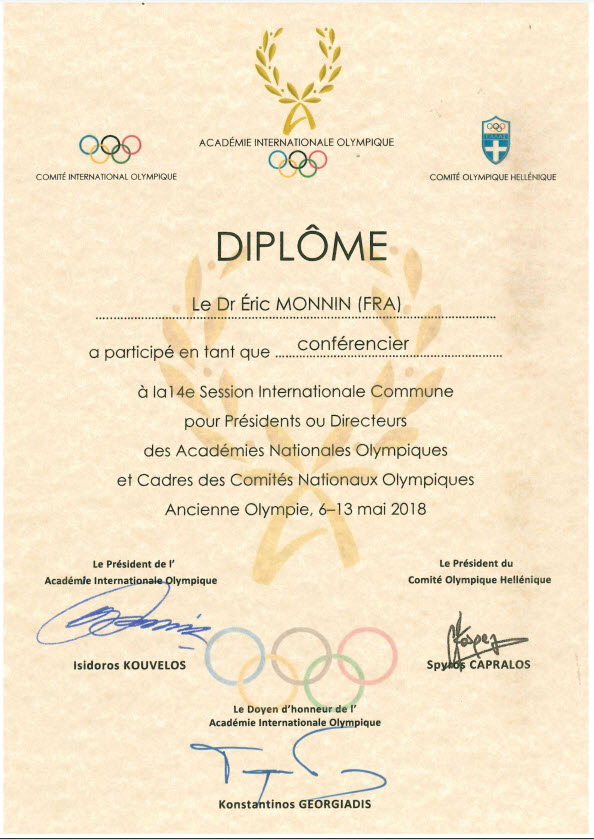

In 2012, the International Olympic Committee (IOC) awarded him the Pierre de Coubertin medal. It was awarded in August 2013, in Lausanne, by IOC President Jacques Rogge. He was the first Frenchman to hold this prestigious medal, which rewards all of his work for youth (Olympic weeks, participation in the youth camp at the Olympic Games in Australia and Greece). His research has also been carried out within the Pierre de Coubertin International Committee, of which he is a member along with professors Müller and Schantz.

In 2014, he received the Certificate of Accreditation in the Citizen Reserve at the rank of Lieutenant Colonel. He also participated in the Opportunity Study on an Olympic and Paralympic bid for Paris 2024 and then in the work of the Paris 2024 bid.

From 2015 to 2017, the regional prefect appointed him as a qualified personality to the Economic, Social and Environmental Council (CESER) of the Burgundy Franche-Comté region and he sat on two commissions: Finance/Europe and Mobility/Energy, but he was not reappointed. He also participated in the Interregional Dynamics working group and in the work of the CESERs of France on the assessment of regional public policies. The same year, he joined the scientific committee of the Sports and Citizenship think tank.

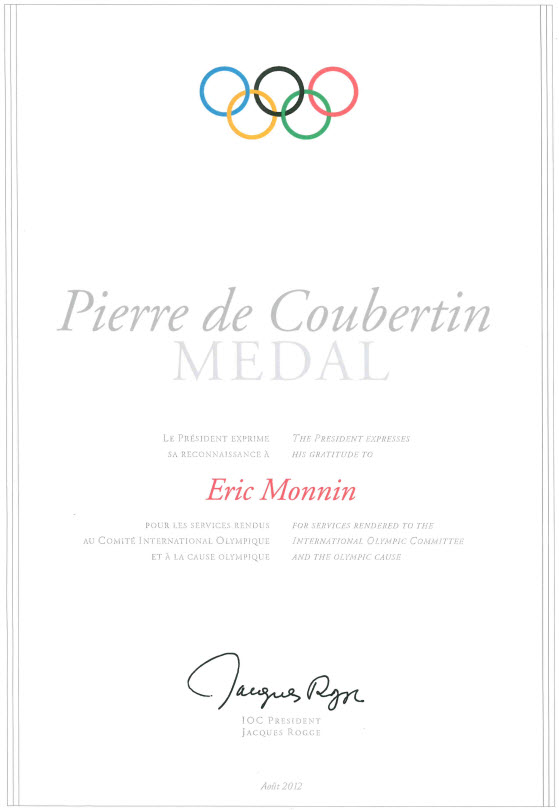

In 2015, he participated as a scientific/historical advisor in the 52' documentary, directed by Véronique Lhorme, entitled Jesse Owens - Ludwig Long: le temps d'une étreinte or Jesse Owens - Ludwig Long : the time of an embrace. This film traces the story of friendship between the African-American sprinter Jesse Owens and the German athlete Luz Long, during the Olympic Games in Berlin in 1936.

In 2019, after having been an associate auditor at the Higher Institute for National Defense Studies (IHEDN) in Franche-Comté since 2013, he became an auditor following the 218th session of the IHEDN organized in the Bourgogne Franche-Comté region.

On June 29, 2021, he was elected administrator of the French National Olympic and Sports Committee (CNOSF) as a qualified personality.

In 2022, he has been appointed for 5 years as a representative of the CNOSF in the new college "Terminology and French language in the framework of the preparation of the Olympic and Paralympic Games of Paris 2024" set up by the Minister in charge of Sports, Mrs. Roxana Maracineanu.

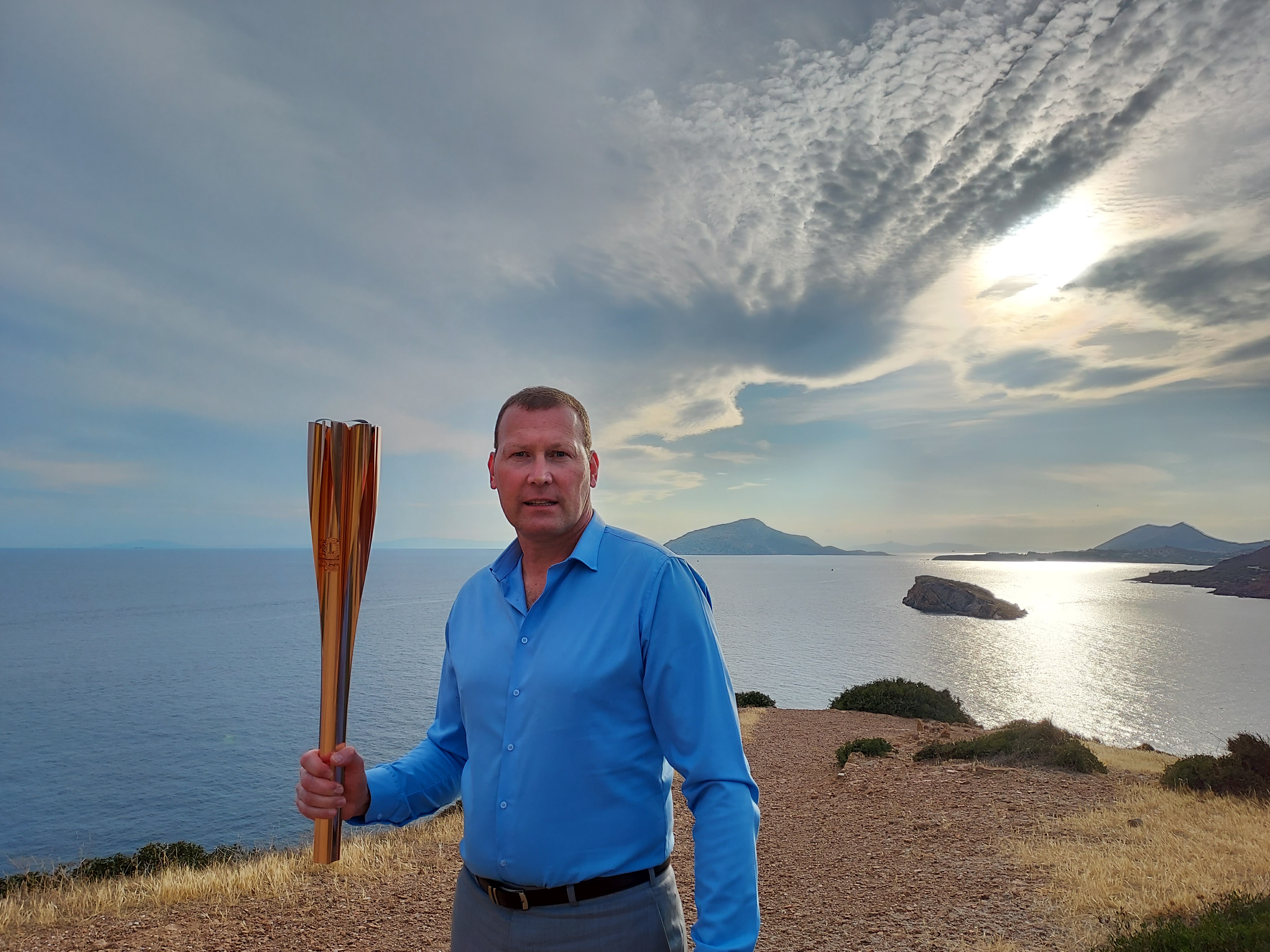

For the Games of the XXXII Olympiad in Tokyo, he was invited to carry the Olympic torch on Greek soil.

To mark the Beijing Winter Olympics, he published a new book entitled From Chamonix to Beijing. One century of Olympism in winter published by Désiris. This work has a foreword written by the President of the International Olympic Committee (IOC), Thomas Bach.

== Center for Olympic Studies and Research (CEROU) ==
In September 2017, the city of Paris became the host city for the future Games of the XXX Olympiad in Paris in 2024. Éric Monnin suggested to the presidency of the University of Franche-Comté a new innovative research axis, through a new theme, that of Olympism.

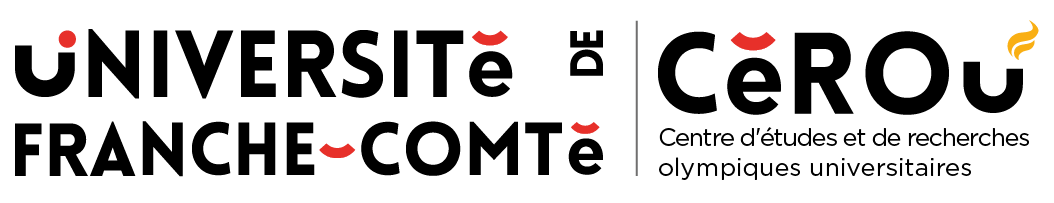

This Olympic concept totally met the requests of the Ministry of Higher Education, Research and Innovation with the main objective of linking the practice of sports to an educational, cultural or citizen ambition around Olympism and its values.

On February 4, 2019, on the occasion of the launch of the Olympic and Paralympic Week (SOP), the Ministry of Higher Education, Research and Innovation and the Ministry of Sports, under its impetus, awarded the label "Generation 2024" to the University of Franche-Comté.

It officially initiates the CEROU project launched on September 20, 2019. The Minister of Sports Roxana Maracieanu brought her high patronage to the official launch.

CEROU is unique in France. It aims to increase the attractiveness (Generation 2024 label, etc.) and influence of research on French territory and abroad (Land of Games label, etc.), with the support of the International Olympic Committee (IOC), the Paris 2024 Olympic and Paralympic Games Organizing Committee, the French National Olympic and Sports Committee (CNOSF), the Ministry of Sports and the International Committee of the Francophonie Games.

He was appointed Director of the CEROU on March 12, 2020.

On March 30, 2020, the International Olympic Committee (IOC) officially included CEROU in its reference document entitled "Study centers around the world".

== International expert missions ==
Eric Monnin regularly speaks as an expert in many countries such as Saudi Arabia, the United Kingdom, South Korea, Greece, Colombia, Italy, the Eastern Caribbean... to promote French, as the Olympic language, and the influence of French culture and the Francophonie.

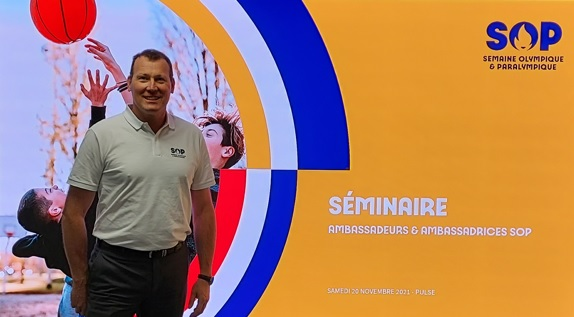

In December 2021, he was appointed ambassador of the Olympic and Paralympic week (SOP) for Paris 2024.

== Requests from the media ==
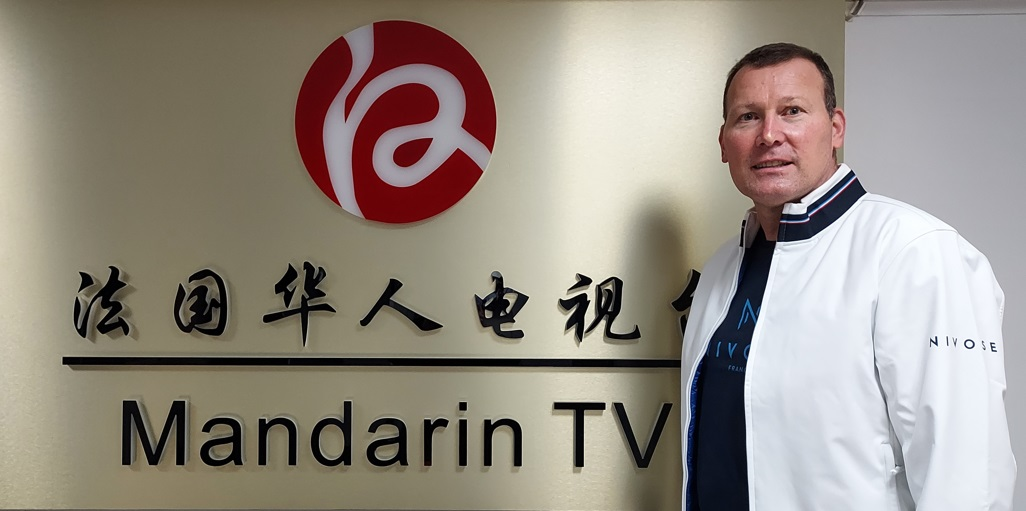

At the occasion of global events such as the Olympic Games, the soccer World Cup... Eric Monnin multiplies interventions, debates, columns and interviews in many media: TV (Sport 365, Eurosport, NRTV (Switzerland), Cnews, France national and regional television, Mandarin TV...), radio (France inter, France info, France culture, RTBF (Belgium), RCF, Autoroute info 107. 7, Radio campus, RCF, France bleu etc.), internet (JOL presse, Aujourd'hui la Russie (Moscow), Les Inrocks, L'Express, La Trench, LCI, etc.), newspaper/magazine (Libération, Ouest France, Le Figaro, Le Matin (Switzerland), L'Est républicain, La croix, Le Progrès, La Lettre de l'économie du sport, etc.).

Since 2021, he has been a consultant for Eurosport and he comments the opening and closing ceremonies of the Games of the XXXII Olympiad in Tokyo and those of Beijing in 2022.

== Musical career ==
Éric Monnin studied music theory and instruments for many years at the ‘Conservatoire national de région de musique de Besançon’.

In 1989 the conservatory awarded him the Diploma of Musical Training and in 1992 the Diploma of Trumpet.

He played simultaneously in several orchestras:

- From 1991 to 1994: Member of the Besançon Philharmonic Orchestra.
- From 1989 to 1992: Member of the youth orchestra of the National Conservatory of Music of Besançon.

== Sports career ==
Éric Monnin is a former junior international and member of the French junior group in judo over 95 kg, registered for several years on the ministerial list of high level athletes, he has won several podiums at the French school and university championships. He is a 3rd dan black belt and has been a member of the Franc-Comtois dojo since October 1973.

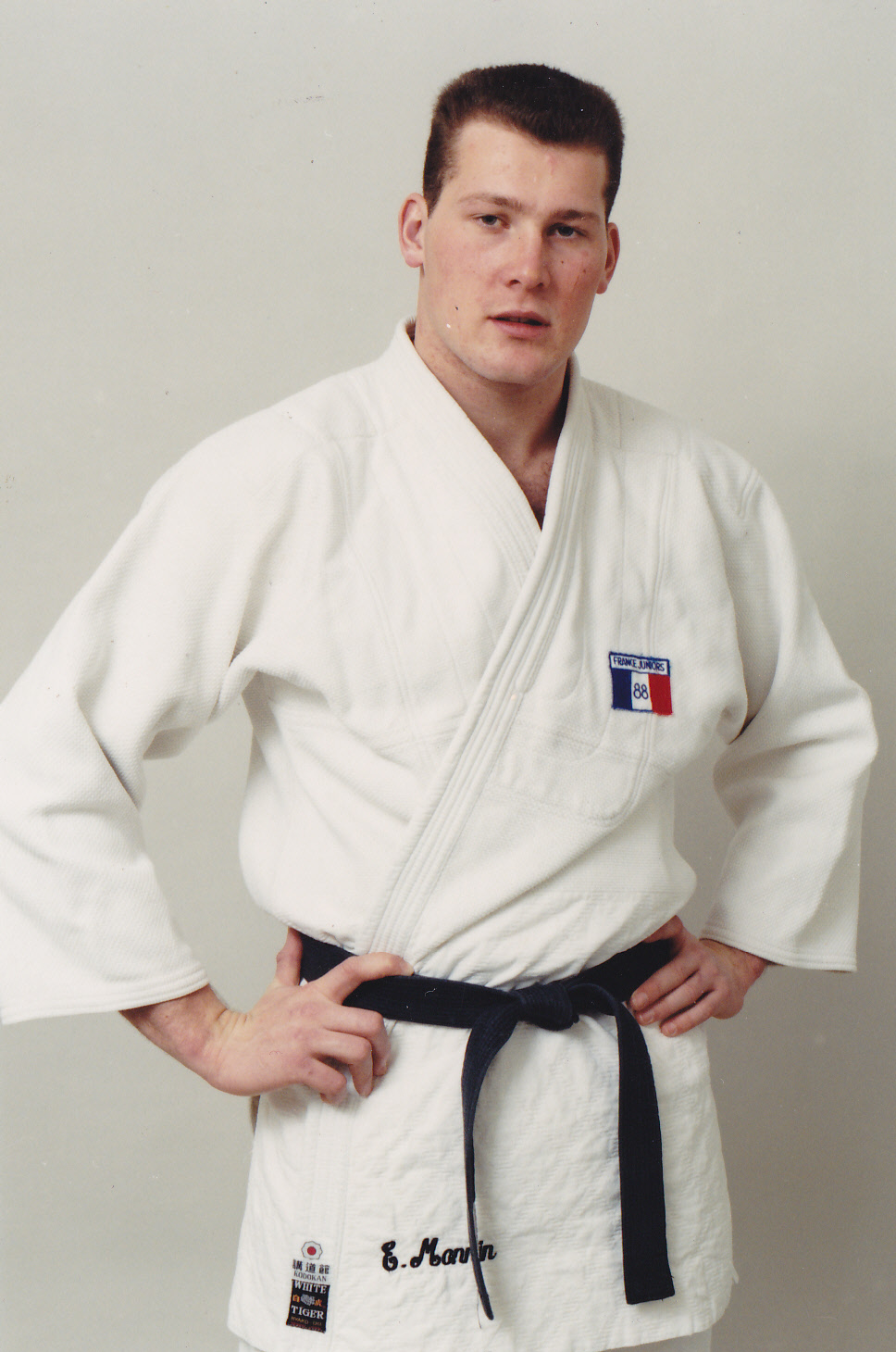

- Member of the French Junior Team in 1986, 1987, 1988.
- 3 international tournaments won in Laon in 1987 and Porrentruy (Switzerland) in 1989 and 1990.
- 3rd at the Dijon international team tournament in 1990;
- 2 participations in the French tournament, with the French Junior Team (international selection);
- 27 participations in the French championships (federal, university and school) from 1982 to 1995;
- 1 title of school champion of France UGSEL (Avignon);
- 1 title of school vice-champion of France UGSEL (Paris);
- 4 3rd places at the French championships (FFSU and UNSS)

== Publications ==
=== Books ===
- Monnin, Eric (2001). Un siècle d'olympisme en hiver (in French). Meolans-Revel: Éditions Désiris. ISBN 978-2-907653-71-8.
- Monnin, Eric (2008). L'olympisme à l'école (in French). Besançon/Belfort: Besançon, Presses universitaires de Franche-Comté et Pôle éditorial multimédia de l’Université de Technologie de Belfort Montbéliard. ISBN 978-2-84867-240-3.
- Monnin, Eric (2010). De Chamonix à Vancouver (in French). Meolans-Revel: Éditions Désiris. ISBN 978-2-915418-38-5.
- Monnin, Eric; Loudcher, Jean-François; Ferréol (sous la dir. de) (2012). Éducation et olympisme en Europe (in French). Belfort: Pôle éditorial multimédia de l’Université de Technologie de Belfort Montbéliard. ISBN 978-2-914279-57-4.
- Monnin, Eric (2013). De Chamonix à Sotchi (in French). Gap: Éditions Désiris. ISBN 978-2-36403-066-4.
- Monnin, Eric; Ferréol (sous la dir. de), Gilles (2014). Sport, santé et cohésion sociale (in French). Belfort: Pôle éditorial multimédia de l’Université de Technologie de Belfort Montbéliard. ISBN 978-2-914279-89-5.
- Monnin, Eric (2021). De Chamonix à Beijing (in French). Éditions Désiris. p. 254. ISBN 978-2-36403-193-7.

=== Book edition ===
- Monnin Éric, Loudcher Jean-François et Ferréol Gilles (sous la dir.) (2012), Éducation et olympisme en Europe, Pôle éditorial multimédia de l’Université de Technologie de Belfort Montbéliard, préfacé par le Président du CIO, 216 pages.
- Monnin Éric et Ferréol Gilles (sous la dir. de) (2014), Sport, santé et cohésion sociale, Pôle éditorial multimédia de l’Université de Technologie de Belfort Montbéliard, préfacé par la Présidente de la fédération française de randonnée pédestre, 256 pages.

=== Book chapters ===
- Monnin Éric et David Renaud (2008), « Une certaine idée du monde : Pierre de Coubertin et les relations internationales », in C. Boli (sous la dir. de) : Les Jeux olympiques : fierté nationale et enjeu mondial, Paris, Atlantica /Musée national du Sport, pp. 93–105.
- Monnin Éric et David Renaud (2008), « Les boycotts des Jeux olympiques de Melbourne 1956 », in C. Boli (sous la dir. de) : Les Jeux Olympiques : fierté nationale et enjeu mondial, Paris, Atlantica /Musée national du Sport, pp. 47–58.
- Monnin Éric (2008), « Le phénomène olympique : analyse et étude des représentations et des pratiques à l’école », in M. Messing et N. Müller (sous la dir. de) : Olympismus. Erbe und Verantwortung, Kassel, Agon, pp. 349–362.
- Monnin Éric et Loudcher Jean-François (2012), « Aux origines de l’institutionnalisation du CNS et du COF (1906-1913) : le modèle républicain en question », in M. Attali et N. Bazoge (sous la dir. de), Diriger le sport. Perspectives sur la gouvernance du sport du XX^{e} siècle à nos jours, Paris, CNRS Éditions, pp. 21–35.
- Monnin Éric (2012), « International Olympic Committee », in J. Nauright et C. Parrish (sous la dir. de), Sports around the World : History, Culture, and Practice, Santa Barbara, ABC-Clio, pp. 23–26.
- Monnin Éric et David Renaud (2012), « From Versailles to Brussels: the origins, hesitations and actions of the Association of European Olympic Committees », in C. Sobry (sous la dir. de), Sport Governance in the world; A socio-historical approach, Paris, Le Manuscrit, vol.III, pp. 227–262.
- Monnin Éric (2014), « Éducation et olympisme de 1922 à nos jours », dans Collectif Projet Demenÿ, Histoire de l’éducation physique en France depuis le milieu du XIX^{e} siècle, dans le cadre de L'U.O.H. (Université Ouverte des Humanités), enregistrement vidéo effectué le 19 juin 2012, mise en ligne le 15 octobre 2014
- Monnin Éric (2016), « L’Institut Olympique de Lausanne de Pierre de Coubertin à un éducation olympique contemporaine », in S. Wassong, N. Müller et J.-L. Chappelet (sous la dir. de), Pierre de Coubertin and the future, Kassel, Agon Sportverlag, pp. 175–186.
- Monnin Éric (2016), « Olympic education: learning mutual respect », in K. Georgiadis (dir. de), Olympic values: respect for diversity, Olympia, International olympic academy and the International olympic committee, pp. 88–108.
- Monnin Éric (2016), « L’olympisme, outil d’éducation à la citoyenneté ? in G. Ferréol (dir. de), Égalité, mixité, intégration par le sport, Louvain-la-Neuve, EME Éditions, pp. 111-127.
- Monnin Éric (2018), « La planète à l’heure grenobloise », in O. Cogne (sous la dir. de), Grenoble 1968 - Les Jeux olympiques qui ont changé l'Isère, Grenoble, Éditions Glénat, pp. 100-113.
- Monnin Éric (2020), « La instalación del Comité Olímpico Internacional en Lausana por Pierre de Coubertin », in Nelson Todt, Ana Miragaya et Lamartine DaCosta (dir. de), ‘Reinvention of Sport and Olympic Games Post-Pandemics: a Return to Pierre de Coubertin’, pp. 43–57.
- Monnin Éric (2021), « Olympic Education and Host City of the Olympic Games: The example of Paris 2024 », in D. Binder, R. Naul et L. Fialova (dir. de), Olympic education – History, theory, practice, Proceedings of the 4th Willibald Gebhardt Olympic Symposium, Aachen, Meyer &Meyer Verlag, pp. 121–130.

=== Articles in peer-reviewed scientific journals ===
- Monnin Éric (2005), « La structure du CNOSF : simple enjeu de société ou véritable performance humaine et politique ? », Questions de sport, n° 3, septembre, pp. 38–45.
- Monnin Éric (2008), « Genèse et attribution des premiers Jeux olympiques de la jeunesse », Revue européenne de management du sport, n°22, juillet, pp. 87–101.
- Monnin Éric et Monnin Catherine (2008), « Le boycott politique des Jeux olympiques de Montréal », Relations internationales, n°134, printemps, pp. 93–113.
- Monnin Éric et David Renaud (2009), « The Melbourne Olympic Games in the context of the international tensions of 1956 », Journal of Olympic History, vol.17, n°3, décembre, pp. 34–40.
- Monnin Éric et David Renaud (2012), « Le Mouvement olympique et l’Europe : histoire et actualité de l’association des Comités olympiques européens », European Studies in Sports History, vol.4, pp.165-189.
- Monnin Éric (2012), « The Olympic Movement's strategy for the integration of the concept of Olympic education into the education system: the French example », Educational review, Routledge Taylor & Francis, vol. 64, n°3, pp. 333–351.
- Monnin Éric (2013), « Représentations et pratiques du phénomène olympique à l’école », Revue Diversité, n°171, janvier, pp. 141–146.
- Monnin Éric et Loudcher Jean-François (2013), « Le Comité National des Sports : un nouveau modèle de gouvernance républicaine singulière (1901-1925) ? » Revue Olympika, vol. XXII, pp. 71–90.
- Monnin Éric et Maillard Christophe (2014), « Une éducation à l’olympisme est-elle possible ? », Éducation et socialisation [En ligne], n°36, mis en ligne le 15 octobre 2014, Presses universitaires de la Méditerranée, Éducation et socialisation. Les Cahiers du CERFEE.
- Monnin Éric (2014), « Du sanctuaire d’Olympie à Pierre de Coubertin », Histoire antique et médiévale, Éditions Faton, Hors-série, n°40, octobre, pp. 8–11.
- Monnin Éric (2014), « Liens entre Antiquité grecque et olympisme moderne », Histoire antique et médiévale, Éditions Faton, Hors-série, n°40, octobre, pp. 18–19.
- Monnin Éric et Maillard Christophe (2015), « Pour une typologie systémique du boycottage des Jeux Olympiques », Relations internationales, n°162, juillet-septembre, pp. 173–189.
- Monnin Éric et Maillard Christophe (2015), « Le Football Club Sochaux Montbéliard des années trente au miroir de Max Weber : un essai d’interprétation », Société d’Émulation de Montbéliard, Montbéliard, pp. 199-219.
- Monnin Éric (2017), « Different Olympic committees promote Olympic education in youth camps », in R. Naul, D. Binder, A. Rychtecky et I. Culpan (sous la dir.), Olympic education – an international review, Londres, Routledge Taylor & Francis Group, pp. 161-176.
- Monnin Éric (2018), « Olympic education and Sports role models », Korea Institute of Sports Science (KISS), International Journal of Applied Sports Science (IJASS), Vol. 30, No. 2, 91-97.
- Monnin Éric (2019), “From the “Year of Olympism, from school to university label” to “the Generation 2024” Olympic label: an Example within the University of Franche-Comté”, Diagoras: International Academic Journal on Olympic Studies, n°3, pp. 193-205.
- Monnin Éric (2019), « The Shrine of Olympia Between Religious Ceremonial and Athletic Competition », Journal of Olympic History, Vol. 27, n°3, pp. 56-65.
- Monnin Éric (2020), « The implementation of the Olympic education concept through "Generation 2024"», Cultural research of the olympics, Nippon Sport Science University (NSSU), n°5, pp. 105-129.
- Monnin Éric (2021), « Es concebible una institucionalización de la educación olímpica », Revista Interamericana de Investigación, Educación y Pedagogía (RIIEP), Vol. 14, n°2, pp. 71-112.

== Filmography ==
- Monnin Éric (2016), Jesse Owens - Luz Long. Le temps d'une étreinte, Role of historical/scientific consultant in the production of the documentary film directed by Ms. Véronique Lhorme.

== Awards ==
- Knight of the National Order of Merit (2010)
- Officer of the Order of Academic Palms
- Bronze medal for voluntary military services
- Gold Medal for youth, sports and associative commitment
- Pierre de Coubertin Medal awarded by the International Olympic Committee
- Finalist for the 2001 Sport Scriptum prize
- Medal of honor from the city of Dammarie-les-Lys (77)
