= Ultras (ice hockey) =

Fanatical ice hockey fans

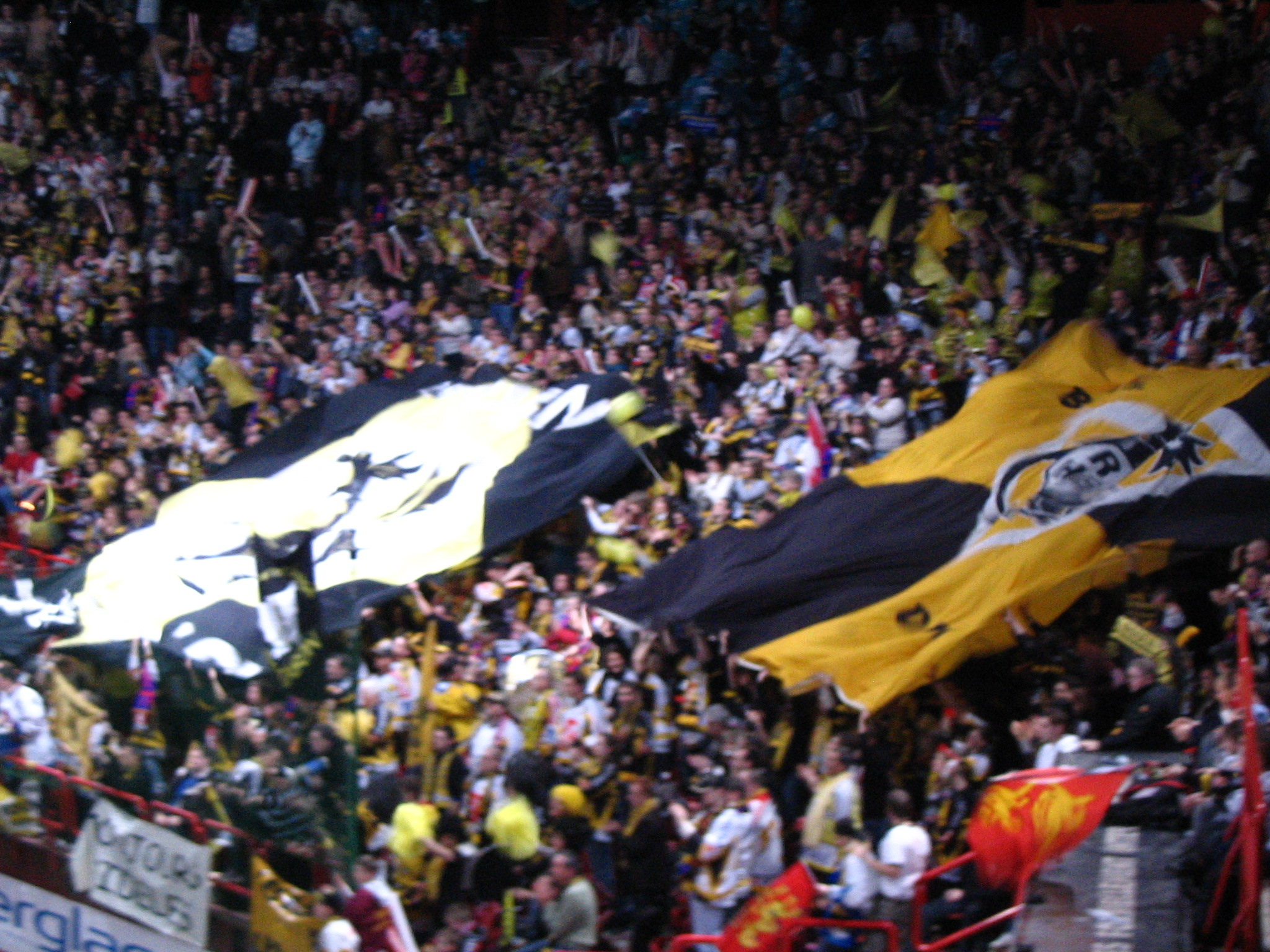
French ice hockey fans with tifos in a 2008 French Cup game.

Ultras are a type of ice hockey fans mainly in European ice hockey culture who are known for their fanatical support of a club. The term originated in Italy and comes from the Latin word ultra, meaning "beyond" or "farther", but is used worldwide to describe predominantly organised fans of sports clubs. Ultras fans in ice hockey are known for organised chants, tifo choreographies, flags and sometimes flares.

Ultras in ice hockey are known for violence and hooliganism. Some ice hockey teams have association football sections and share fans and fan groups with them. Some ultras groups are linked to far-right ideologies and fascism.

== Europe ==
=== Finland ===
The first ultras groups in Finnish hockey were HC TPS' Sissiryhmä founded in the early 2000s, Helsingin Jokerit's fan group Ultras Jokerit and HIFK Helsinki’s ”Stadin Kingit” founded in 2001 which was Finland's first multi-sport ultra group and Vaasan Sport's Ultras 06 founded in 2004, and Lahti Pelicans' Ääriliike founded in 2005, and Porin Ässät's fan group Pataljoona founded in 2008.

Most of the first wave ultras groups no longer exist. HC TPS supporters go by the name Mutka. Since 2023 the ultras section of Jokerit went by Katupojat until being disestablished in 2024. Pelicans' different supporter groups have united as Lahen Turkoosi. Among the second-wave ultras groups activated during the 2010s are Ilves' Osasto 41, Sinioranssit of Tappara Tampere, Poromafia of Oulun Kärpät, Raumam Boja of Lukko Rauma, Kuudes Kenttäpelaaja of KooKoo, Red Army Vaasa of Vaasan Sport and Pataljoona of Porin Ässät

=== Germany ===
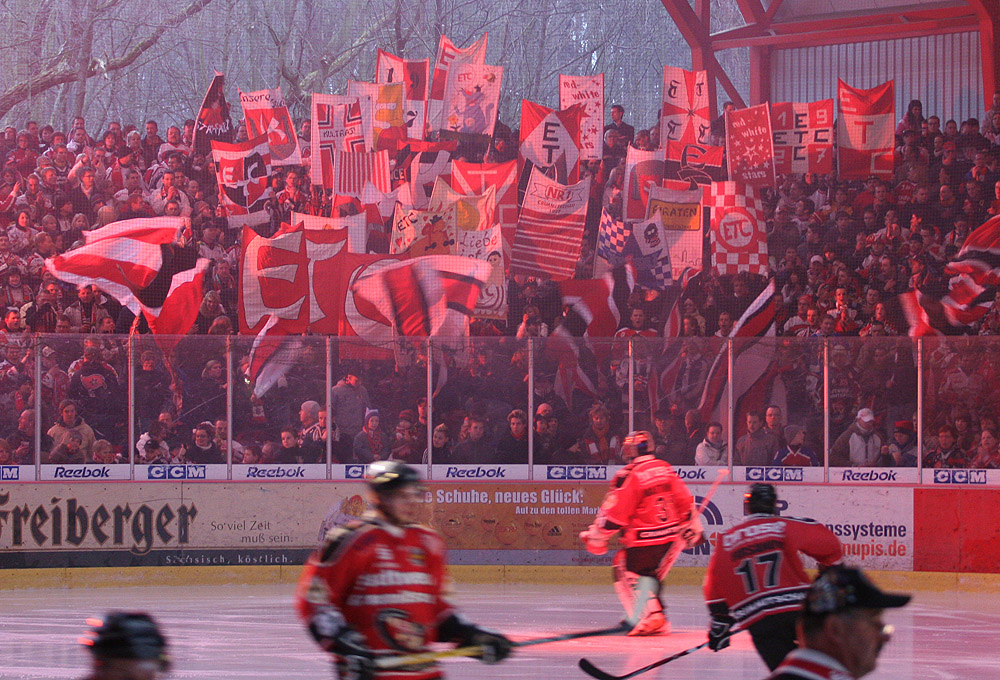
ETC Crimmitschau fans

Since the early 2000s, the ultras ideology has also become established in the German ice hockey fan scene, and various ultra groups can be found in many ice rinks and arenas from the DEL to the minor leagues. However, the first ultra-similar groups formed earlier. In the mid-1990s the first choreographies were seen in Munich and the Munich Supporters were formed. The ultras group Red Line was founded in Krefeld in 1996. Groups also formed in Augsburg and Schwenningen before the turn of the millennium. Choreography and other ultra features were viewed very skeptically at the time, but are now common practice in many arenas. In the relatively small scene there are a lot of contacts between the active people of the various groups. Violence occurs irregularly between ultra groups in various clubs.

=== Sweden ===
Two of the biggest ultras groups in Swedish ice hockey belong to rival teams Djurgårdens IF and AIK IF.

=== Switzerland ===
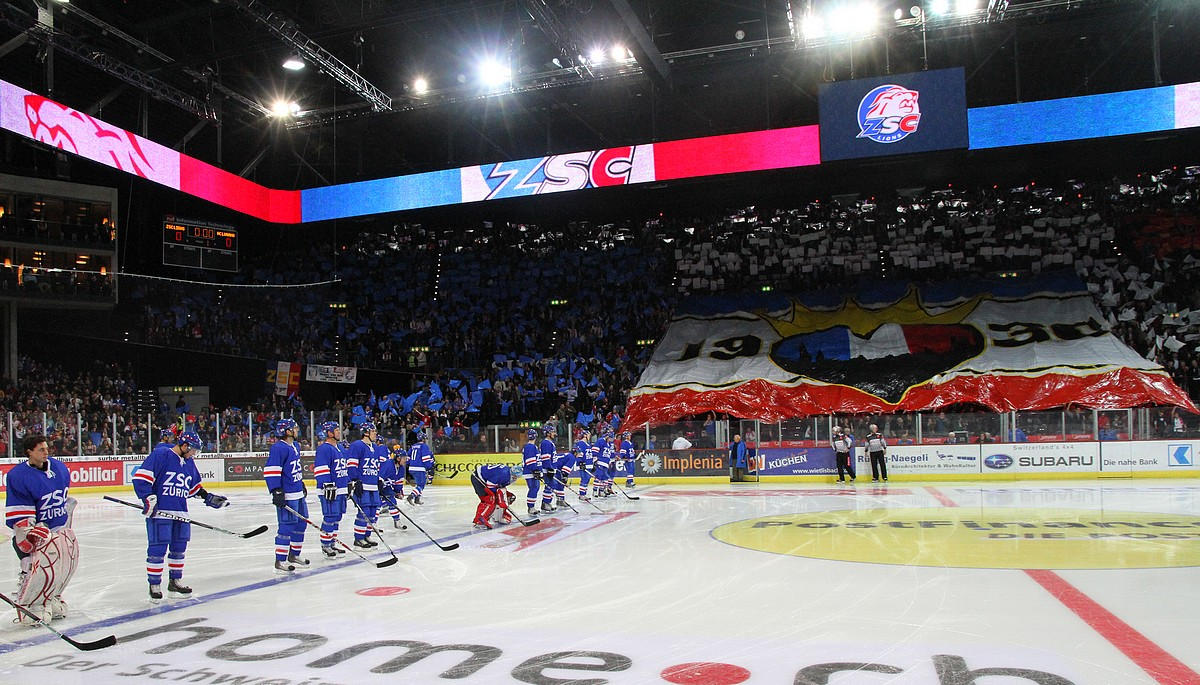
ZSC Lions fans with a tifo

The most common violations of law by ultras and hooligans in the 2019–20 ice hockey and football season were infringements of the explosives law, not adhering to the ban on face-coverings and engaging in violence or intimidation towards authorities.

Some ultras groups in Switzerland include the Friburgensis of the Fribourg-Gotteron and the ZSC Lions ultras groups.
