= Ice hockey in Norway =

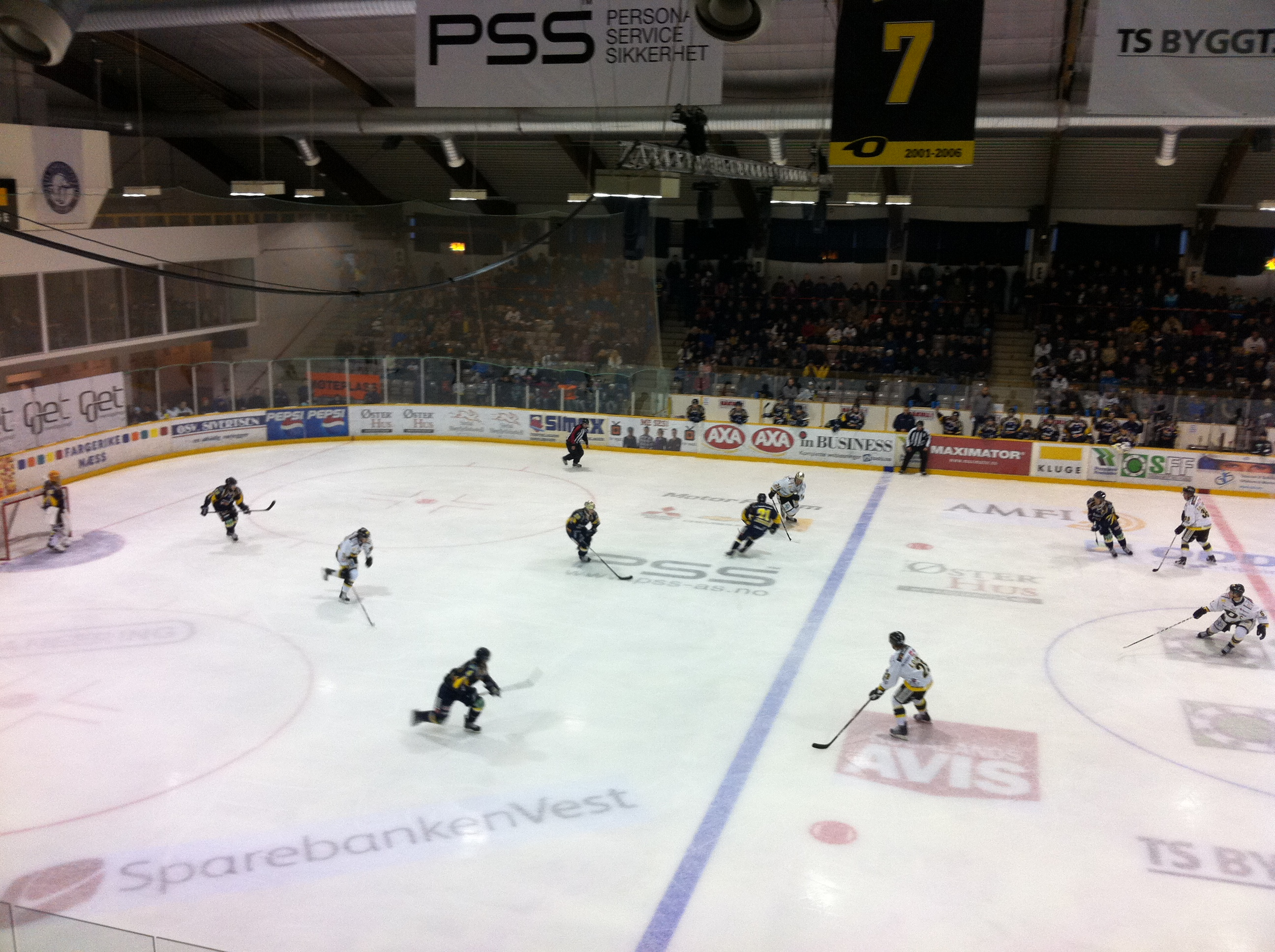
- Country: Norway
- Governing body: Norwegian Ice Hockey Association
- National teams: Men's national team Women's national team
- Clubs: 25 (in the men's top 3 tiers)

National competitions
- EliteHockey Ligaen; First Division; Norwegian Second Division

International competitions
- Ice Hockey European Championships; IIHF World Championships; Winter Olympics

Ice hockey in Norway is a minor but growing sport. It has had to compete with other sports for national attention. Norway has a men's, women's and junior national team.

At the higher levels of play, ice hockey is primarily concentrated in the southeast areas (Lillehammer in the north to Halden in the south) and the city of Stavanger, and increasingly in the town of Narvik in Northern Norway. In the rest of Norway ice hockey is a niche sport.

== Governing body ==
The Norwegian Ice Hockey Association governs ice hockey in the country. It was founded on September 18, 1934, and became a member of the International Ice Hockey Federation (IIHF) on January 20, 1935.

== History ==
Ice hockey has been played in Norway since the 1930s. The first official match was played on 19 February 1933 when SFK Trygg won against Sportsklubben Rapp 4–1 in a break during the 1933 World Allround Speed Skating Championships in Trondheim. On 16 September 1934, the Norwegian Ice Hockey Association was formed. The 1958 Ice Hockey World Championships in Oslo and 1999 Men's Ice Hockey World Championships were held on Norway from 1–16 May and the matches were played in Oslo (Jordal Amfi), Hamar (CC Amfi) and Lillehammer (Håkon Hall). Norway also hosted ice hockey events during the 1952 Winter Olympics in Oslo and the 1994 Winter Olympics in Lillehammer.

The sport is administered by Norwegian Ice Hockey Association (NIHF). National-scale ice hockey leagues in Norway has 3 tiers: EliteHockey Ligaen, 1. divisjon, and 2. divisjon. Smaller leagues below 2. divisjon also exist. Promotions and relegations through play-offs are used between the 3 highest tiers.

== Domestic Leagues ==
=== EliteHockey Ligaen ===
EliteHockey Ligaen is the top professional men's division for ice hockey in Norway and is administered by Norwegian Ice Hockey Association. In the Champions Hockey League, where sponsor names are illegal, the official name is Ligaen.

The league consists of a 10-team round robin that play 5 matches against each opponent during the season, which extends from autumn to spring. Thus, each team plays 45 matches during a season. The teams are ranked according to the number of points (3 for victory in ordinary time, 2 for a victory in overtime, 1 for loss in overtime, 0 zero for loss in ordinary time) at the end of the season. If two or more teams end up with the same score, the placement is determined by mutual results.

The winner is chosen as league champion, and qualifies together with the next seven teams in a cup format, the winner of which is declared the official Norwegian champion. The two last-placed teams at the end of the season enter play-offs to avoid relegation.

==== European qualifications ====
As of the 2024–25 season the Norwegian champion qualifies to the following season's Champions Hockey League. Once has a Norwegian team progressed to the round of 16, which was Storhamar Hockey in the 2018–19 Champions Hockey League.

No teams qualify for the IIHF Continental Cup. The most recent Norwegian team to play in it was Stavanger Oilers in the 2013–14 IIHF Continental Cup, where they won the tournament.

=== 1. divisjon ===
1. divisjon is the Tier 2 division after EliteHockey Ligaen. 1. divisjon was the name of Norwegian ice hockey's top division from 1961/62 to 1989/90, before it was named the Elite Series (1990 / 91-2003 / 04). As of the 2024–25 season there are 8 teams that play a round robin with 6 matches against each other.

As of the 2023–24 season, the top 4 enter a play-off with a best-of-5 series between 1st and 4th place, and between 2nd and 3rd place. The series winners then enter a round robin against 9th and 10th in EliteHockey Ligaen, with the 4 teams playing 2 matches each against each other. Top 2 in the round robin are promoted to (or stays in) the EliteHockey Ligaen.

Until the 2011/12 season, no licence was needed to play in the 1st division. The teams did however still have to apply Norwegian Ice Hockey Association for approval to play in 1. divisjon.

=== 2. divisjon ===
2. divisjon is the Tier 3 league. As of the 2023–24 season there are 7 teams playing in the league, which play a round-robin with 6 matches against each other. Top 2 play a round robin against the bottom 2 in 1. divisjon, with the 4 teams playing 1 match against each other. Top 2 in the round robin are promoted to (or stays in) 1. divisjon.

There is no relegation system to 3. divisjon as of the 2023–24 season.

=== 3. divisjon ===
As of the 2023–24 season there were 2 sub-divisions in the 3. divisjon, namely the West and East divisions. There are no promotions, nor are there any play-offs, let alone between the 2 sub-divisions.

=== Women's leagues ===
The top league of women's ice hockey in Norway is the Bambusa-ligaen. The number of teams in the league has varied between 5 and 8 each season from 2016-17 onwards. There are no ordinary systems for promotions from or relegations to the women's 1. divisjon. As of the 2023–24 season there were 7 teams who played a round robin with 4 matches against each other, for a total of 24 matches.

The play-off cup format has varied over the seasons, being played with either 6 or 8 teams. Occasionally the winner of the women's 1. divisjon also gets invited to the play-offs, for instance Bergen IK in 2016–17.

== Norwegian players abroad ==
=== NHL ===
Mats Zuccarello is considered one of the most talented if not greatest Norwegian ice hockey player of all time, and has played in the NHL each season since the 2010–11 season as of December 2024. Only 8 Norwegians have played in the NHL. The 2024 NHL entry draft became the first draft where a Norwegian player was selected in the first round, when the Detroit Red Wings selected Michael Brandsegg-Nygård as the 15th overall pick. This was followed by the Anaheim Ducks selecting Stian Solberg as the 23rd overall pick.

Espen Knutsen played 5 seasons in the NHL (2 of them interspersed with playing in American Hockey League) and played in the 2002 National Hockey League All-Star Game, the only Norwegian ice hockey player to play in an NHL All-Star Game as of December 2024.

=== European leagues ===
Norwegian players are occasionally seen on the rosters of Swedish Hockey League teams. As of the 2024–25 season this includes, but is not limited to, Michael Brandsegg-Nygård (Skellefteå AIK) and Jonas Arntzen (Örebro HK).

Mats Zuccarello played a short stint for Metallurg Magnitogorsk during the 2012-13 Kontinental Hockey League season, interspersed with playing in the NHL the same season with New York Rangers.

== National teams ==
Norway's men's national ice hockey team is the national ice hockey team of Norway, and represents the country in international ice hockey tournaments. The national team is administered by the Norwegian Ice Hockey Federation (NIHF), which was established in 1934. Norway has been a member of the International Ice Hockey Federation (IIHF) since 1935.

Norway has not won any medals in the World Championships or Olympics. The first international match was played in the 1937 World Cup in Great Britain, and after an initial period of moderate success, Norway lagged behind the other top nations, and from the mid-1960s they ended up permanently in the B-World Cup. Most of the 1970s and 1980s were spent in the B-WC (with some shorter stays in the C-WC), but in 1989 Norway won the B-group in the WC at home and thus moved up to the A-WC again. After relegation in 2001, Norway was promoted to the top division (the former A-VM) in 2005 and has played there since as of the 2025 IIHF World Championship.

Since then, Norway's results have steadily improved: Norway qualified for the quarterfinals of the Ice Hockey World Championships in 2008, 2011 and 2012, and qualified for Winter Olympics in 2010, 2014 and 2018. Among the biggest single matches in recent times are the victory over Canada in the 2000 World Cup, the victory over the Czech Republic in the 2010 World Cup, Sweden in the 2011 World Cup, Germany in the 2012 World Cup, and the quarterfinals in 2008, 2011 and 2012.

Norway women's national ice hockey team has won a championship medal, a European Championship bronze in 1993.

== TV broadcasts ==
Ice hockey is broadcast nationally, most commonly on extended cable; as of December 2024, this included EliteHockey Ligaen on TV2 Sport/TV2 Play, and NHL, Champions Hockey League, and IIHF World Championship on Vsport/Viaplay. 1. divisjon is on streaming services only, primarily on TV2 Play and Direktesport.

Some IIHF World Championship matches are also broadcast on basic cable (TV3+), and TV4 (Sweden) is widely available on extended cable in Norway with occasional Swedish Hockey League matches.
