= Tore Johannessen =

Norwegian ice hockey referee and sports administrator (1922–2005)

- Born: 2 April 1922; Norway
- Died: 5 January 2005 (aged 82)
- Occupation: Ice hockey referee & retailer
- Known for: Norwegian Ice Hockey Association president
- Awards: IIHF Hall of Fame; King's Medal of Merit

Tore Johannessen (2 April 1922 – 5 January 2005) was a Norwegian ice hockey referee and sports administrator. As a referee, he officiated at both the Ice Hockey World Championships and the Winter Olympic Games, and later served as president of the Norwegian Ice Hockey Association. His career was recognized by induction into the IIHF Hall of Fame as a builder in ice hockey, and he received the Norwegian King's Medal of Merit.

== Hockey career ==
Johannessen was born on 2 April 1922, in Norway. He played with IF Ready before becoming an ice hockey referee at the international level. He was assigned by the International Ice Hockey Federation (IIHF) to eight international tournaments, which included the Ice Hockey World Championships and the Winter Olympic Games. He refereed three games at the 1951 Ice Hockey World Championships in Paris.

Johannessen served as vice-president of the Norwegian Ice Hockey Association (NIHA) from 1950 to 1952, and again from 1955 to 1956. He then served as the NIHA president from 1956 to 1964. As president, he also served as the general secretary of the 1958 Ice Hockey World Championships hosted in Norway. At the age of 34, he was the youngest person to become president of any Norwegian sports association at the time.

Johannessen managed the Norway men's national ice hockey team at the 1962 Ice Hockey World Championships. He led Norway to three wins in seven games played, and a fifth-place finish among eight teams. At the same tournament, Johannessen and Norway won the 1962 European Ice Hockey Championship bronze medal, since the event also acted as the European championship.

After retiring as NIHA president, he was the general secretary of Group B of the 1989 Ice Hockey World Championships, hosted in Norway. He was later involved in the planning stages of the Gjøvik Olympic Cavern Hall used in ice hockey at the 1994 Winter Olympics.

== Personal life ==
Johannessen was the son of a hardware store owner, and co-founded the hardware store chain Jernvarekjøp in 1951. The company became Jernia, where Johannessen was hired in 1961 and worked as chief executive officer for fifteen years until his retirement in 1987. He resided in Drøbak, where he was also a board member of Drøbak-Frogn IL. He died on 5 January 2005.

== Honors ==
Johannessen was inducted into the IIHF Hall of Fame in 1999 in the builder category, and was made an honorary member of the NIHA. In 2001, he received the Norwegian King's Medal of Merit.
