= Euro Ice Hockey Challenge =

- Status: active
- Genre: sports event
- Date: August–February
- Frequency: annual
- Location: various
- Inaugurated: October 2001
- Organiser: IIHF
- Website: www.eihc.eu

The Euro Ice Hockey Challenge is a yearly series of national ice hockey tournaments, organized during the international breaks defined in the IIHF calendar in November, December, and February. Tournaments are played in different locations in Europe and sometimes feature teams from outside of Europe, usually Japan.

== Organization ==
The EIHC was founded in October 2001 by the IIHF. Participants are the ice hockey national teams of countries that are themselves at or around the level of the IIHF World Championship Division I. It is a second-tier equivalent to tournaments of the Euro Hockey Tour.

Almost all the teams use the EIHC as preparation for the World Championship later in the same year. It is an opportunity for teams to test less experienced players and for them to gain valuable ice time at an international level.

In 2001 the initial IIHF tournament scheme, planned to last until 2005, included the following 12 participating nations: Ukraine, Austria, Netherlands, Italy, Latvia, Slovenia, Poland, Belarus, Norway, Great Britain, France, Denmark and Hungary. The tournament has since expanded to more than 4 tournaments and the occasional participation by Japan.

Coordination of the EIHC was led by Zoltán Kovács of Hungary, Jon Haukeland of Norway, and several others.

== 2011-2012 tournaments ==
The 2012 edition consisted of seven tournaments:

=== 2nd International Break ===
EIHC Hungary

Team
Austria
Italy
Japan
Hungary

Standby: Ukraine

EIHC Belarus

Team
Belarus
Denmark
Japan
Slovenia

EIHC Poland

Team
Croatia
Netherlands
Poland
Romania

Standby: Lithuania

=== 3rd International Break ===
EIHC Romania

Team
Kazakhstan
Poland
Romania
Ukraine

Standby: Hungary/Serbia

EIHC Slovenia

Team
France
Norway
Russia B
Slovenia

Standby: Hungary

=== 4th International Break ===
EIHC Norway

Team
Denmark
France
Latvia
Norway

EIHC Ukraine

Team
Italy
Kazakhstan
Spain
Ukraine

Standby: Lithuania/Romania
