= Ørjan Løvdal =

Norwegian ice hockey player and coach

- Born: 24 September 1962 (age 63) Svolvær, Norway
- Height: 5 ft 10 in (178 cm)
- Weight: 172 lb (78 kg; 12 st 4 lb)
- Position: Centre
- Shot: Left
- Played for: Stjernen Hockey
- National team: Norway
- Playing career: 1980–1997

Ørjan Løvdal (born 24 September 1962 in Svolvær, Norway) is a Norwegian ice hockey player and coach. He spent most of his career with Stjernen Hockey of the Norwegian Elitserien. He also played for the Norwegian national ice hockey team, and participated at the Winter Olympics in 1984, 1988, and 1992. He was Norwegian champion in 1986. He was awarded Gullpucken as best Norwegian ice hockey player in 1986 and 1987.

== Career statistics ==
			Regular season					Playoffs
Season	Team	League	GP	G	A	Pts	PIM	GP	G	A	Pts	PIM
1980–81	Almtuna IS	Division 1	26	7	10	17	22	2	0	1	1	2
1981–82	Hammarby Hockey	Division 1	28	6	9	15	24	10	3	2	5	20
1982–83	Hammarby Hockey	SHL	26	3	3	6	16	—	—	—	—	—
1983–84	Stjernen Hockey	Norway	28	32	25	57	—	—	—	—	—	—
1984–85	Stjernen Hockey	Norway	28	19	37	56	—	—	—	—	—	—
1985–86	Stjernen Hockey	Norway	—	48	60	108	—	—	—	—	—	—
1986–87	Stjernen Hockey	Norway	—	37	51	88	—	—	—	—	—	—
1987–88	Vålerenga Ishockey	Norway	—	—	—	—	—	—	—	—	—	—
1988–89	Stjernen Hockey	Norway	35	37	59	96	—	—	—	—	—	—
1989–90	Stjernen Hockey	Norway	34	34	41	75	—	—	—	—	—	—
1990–91	Stjernen Hockey	Norway	32	22	36	58	—	—	—	—	—	—
1991–92	Stjernen Hockey	Norway	—	—	—	—	—	—	—	—	—	—
1992–93	Stjernen Hockey	Norway	—	—	—	—	—	—	—	—	—	—
1993–94	Stjernen Hockey	Norway	32	18	29	47	—	—	—	—	—	—
1994–95	Stjernen Hockey	Norway	34	18	39	57	—	—	—	—	—	—
1996–97	Stjernen Hockey	Norway	6	3	4	7	6	—	—	—	—	—
Norway totals			229	268	381	649	6	—	—	—	—	—
