= Tommy Jakobsen =

Norwegian ice hockey player

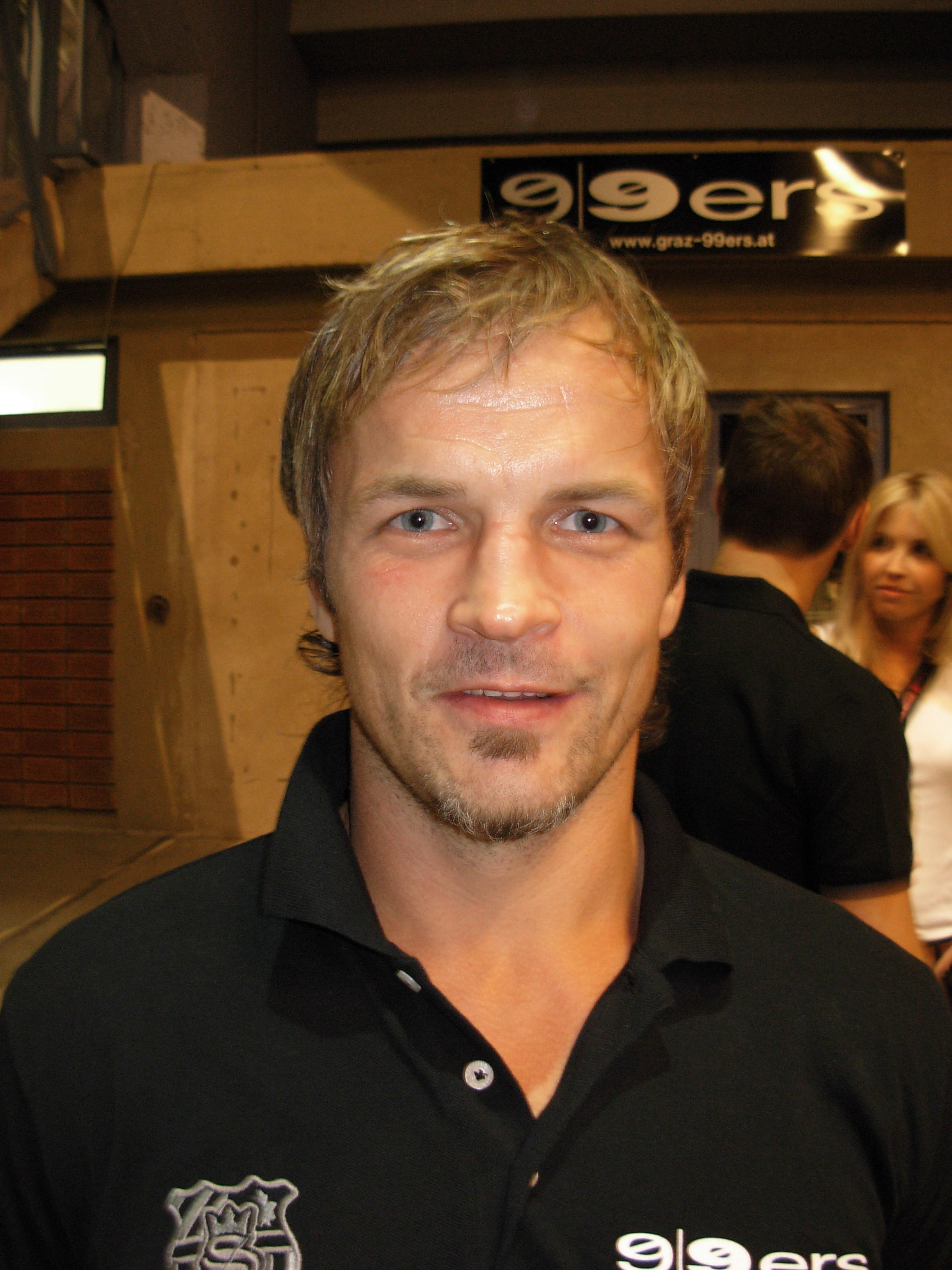
- Born: 10 December 1970 (age 55) Oslo, Norway
- Height: 5 ft 8 in (173 cm)
- Weight: 182 lb (83 kg; 13 st 0 lb)
- Position: Defence
- Shot: Left
- Played for: Lørenskog IK; Furuset; Lillehammer IK; Spektrum Flyers; Djurgården IF; Augsburger Panther; DEG Metro Stars; Graz 99ers SC Bern
- National team: Norway
- Playing career: 1987–2013

Tommy Jakobsen (born 10 December 1970) is a Norwegian former professional ice hockey defenceman.

He is the most experienced player on the Norwegian national team going into the 2009 IIHF World Championship with 125 official matches. Jakobsen participated in the 1992 Winter Olympics in Albertville, and the games at Lillehammer two years later.

He was his country's flag bearer during the opening ceremony of the 2010 Olympic Games in Vancouver. He also wore the captaincy for the hockey team.

Jakobsen was expelled from the 2010 World Championship tournament for intentional physical contact with an on-ice official during a 12-1 loss to Canada.

== Career statistics ==
=== Regular season and playoffs ===
			Regular season					Playoffs
Season	Team	League	GP	G	A	Pts	PIM	GP	G	A	Pts	PIM
1987–88	Furuset	NOR	36	1	3	4	8	—	—	—	—	—
1988–89	Furuset	NOR	36	1	0	1	28	—	—	—	—	—
1989–90	Furuset	NOR	36	6	4	10	20	—	—	—	—	—
1990–91	Furuset	NOR	32	3	4	7	58	—	—	—	—	—
1991–92	Furuset	NOR	31	2	5	7	71	—	—	—	—	—
1992–93	Lillehammer IK	NOR	34	9	10	19	36	—	—	—	—	—
1993–94	Lillehammer IK	NOR	29	6	9	15	59	—	—	—	—	—
1994–95	Spektrum Flyers	NOR	31	11	16	27	44	—	—	—	—	—
1995–96	Djurgårdens IF	SEL	36	0	1	1	20	4	0	0	0	0
1996–97	Augsburger Panther	DEL	48	5	8	13	56	—	—	—	—	—
1997–98	Augsburger Panther	DEL	44	1	11	12	79	6	1	1	2	4
1998–99	Augsburger Panther	DEL	52	3	7	10	85	5	0	1	1	4
1999–2000	Augsburger Panther	DEL	55	5	15	20	93	2	0	0	0	0
2000–01	Augsburger Panther	DEL	46	1	11	12	87	—	—	—	—	—
2001–02	Augsburger Panther	DEL	60	6	17	23	110	4	1	1	2	6
2002–03	DEG Metro Stars	DEL	51	9	19	28	50	5	0	2	2	10
2003–04	DEG Metro Stars	DEL	42	4	8	12	46	4	1	1	2	2
2004–05	DEG Metro Stars	DEL	51	5	11	16	89	—	—	—	—	—
2005–06	DEG Metro Stars	DEL	39	2	10	12	53	14	2	8	10	10
2006–07	Graz 99ers	EBEL	55	5	34	39	205	—	—	—	—	—
2007–08	Graz 99ers	EBEL	40	5	20	25	85	—	—	—	—	—
2007–08	SC Bern	NLA	3	0	0	0	4	3	0	1	1	0
2008–09	Graz 99ers	EBEL	48	1	15	16	50	2	0	0	0	0
2009–10	Lørenskog IK	NOR	45	4	17	21	68	5	0	0	0	2
2010–11	Lørenskog IK	NOR	22	5	10	15	40	11	2	3	5	8
2011–12	Lørenskog IK	NOR	41	1	26	27	64	16	1	6	7	14
2012–13	Lørenskog IK	NOR	37	1	9	10	40	12	0	1	1	16
NOR totals			404	50	113	163	536	44	3	10	13	40
DEL totals			488	41	117	158	748	40	5	14	29	36
EBEL totals			143	11	69	80	340	2	0	0	0	0

=== International ===
Year	Team	Event	GP	G	A	Pts	PIM
1987	Norway	EJC
1989	Norway	WJC	7	0	1	1	6
1990	Norway	WJC	7	0	1	1	6
1992	Norway	OG	7	0	1	1	14
1992	Norway	WC	5	0	1	1	10
1993	Norway	WC	7	0	0	0	12
1994	Norway	OG	7	1	0	1	8
1994	Norway	WC	5	0	0	0	8
1995	Norway	WC	5	0	2	2	8
1996	Norway	WC	5	0	0	0	6
1997	Norway	WC	8	0	1	1	12
1998	Norway	WC B	6	2	2	4	2
1999	Norway	WC	6	1	0	1	2
1999	Norway	WC Q	3	0	1	1	6
2000	Norway	WC	6	0	2	2	8
2002	Norway	WC D1	5	1	2	3	6
2003	Norway	WC D1	5	1	1	2	83
2004	Norway	WC D1	5	1	0	1	4
2005	Norway	OGQ	6	2	3	5	0
2005	Norway	WC D1	5	0	3	3	0
2006	Norway	WC	6	1	1	2	10
2007	Norway	WC	6	0	2	2	8
2008	Norway	WC	7	0	0	0	18
2009	Norway	OGQ	3	0	0	0	4
2009	Norway	WC	6	2	1	3	10
2010	Norway	OG	4	0	1	1	8
2010	Norway	WC	4	0	1	1	29
Junior totals			14	0	2	2	12
Senior totals			132	12	25	37	276
