= Ole Eskild Dahlstrøm =

Norwegian ice hockey player

- Born: 4 March 1970 (age 55) Oslo, NOR
- Height: 6 ft 1 in (185 cm)
- Weight: 200 lb (91 kg; 14 st 4 lb)
- Position: Centre
- Shot: Left
- Played for: Furuset; Örebro; Storhamar Dragons; Adler Mannheim; Lillehammer
- National team: Norway
- NHL draft: 218th overall, 1990; Minnesota North Stars
- Playing career: 1986–2007

Ole Eskild Dahlstrøm (born 4 March 1970 in Oslo, Norway) is a former professional Norwegian ice hockey player.

== Playing career ==
Dahlstrøm broke onto the Norwegian hockey scene 1987/88 playing for Furuset. The following season, still as a junior aged player, he ended up on the IIHF Division 1 All Star team when he helped Norway to promotion for the 1990 IIHF World Championship in Switzerland.

He went to Örebro in the Swedish Division One for the 1988/89 season but came back to his native Furuset after only one season in Sweden. He then played three more seasons for Furuset before signing with Storhamar prior to the 1992/93 season. He scored five goals in his first game for Storhamar against Trondheim. In 527 games with Storhamar he scored 249 goals and 351 assists. Storhamar won five Norwegian Cups in that span. His Storhamar tenure was briefly interrupted when Dahlstrøm went to Adler Mannheim of Germany before the 1997/98 season. He also won the DEL championship that year.

He made the Norwegian All-Star team four times, and played 96 games for Team Norway. In 1996/97 he won the Norwegian Ice Hockey Federation's Golden Puck as the best Norwegian player of the year.

He was drafted by the Minnesota North Stars in 1990. He was selected in the 11th round (218th overall).

== Career statistics ==
			Regular season					Playoffs
Season	Team	League	GP	G	A	Pts	PIM	GP	G	A	Pts	PIM
1987–88	Furuset	Norway	—	28	42	70	—	—	—	—	—	—
1988–89	Örebro IK	Division 1	19	2	9	11	8	—	—	—	—	—
1989–90	Furuset	Norway	35	25	39	64	—	—	—	—	—	—
1990–91	Furuset	Norway	—	—	—	—	—	—	—	—	—	—
1991–92	Furuset	Norway	—	—	—	—	—	—	—	—	—	—
1992–93	Storhamar	Norway	32	24	16	40	12	5	3	0	3	2
1993–94	Storhamar	Norway	32	21	26	47	36	8	1	5	6	0
1994–95	Storhamar	Norway	25	16	21	37	14	8	8	2	10	8
1995–96	Storhamar	Norway	28	14	18	32	32	10	11	11	22	14
1996–97	Storhamar	Norway	34	26	53	79	24	10	3	6	9	8
1997–98	Adler Mannheim	DEL	43	5	9	14	12	4	1	1	2	2
1998–99	Storhamar	Norway	40	20	20	40	51	10	5	5	10	10
1999–00	Storhamar	Norway	24	7	15	22	48	7	1	5	6	6
2000–01	Storhamar	Norway	39	21	39	60	34	3	0	0	0	8
2001–02	Storhamar	Norway	37	17	31	48	20	11	6	5	11	4
2002–03	Storhamar	Norway	38	11	27	38	28	8	3	3	6	6
2003–04	Storhamar	Norway	35	4	18	22	16	13	4	6	10	2
2004–05	Storhamar	Norway	34	8	24	32	36	7	3	2	5	0
2005–06	Lillehammer IK	Norway	36	6	13	19	20	3	0	0	0	2
2006–07	Lillehammer IK	Norway	27	7	8	15	20	—	—	—	—	—
Norway totals			496	255	410	665	391	103	48	50	98	70

== Post-retirement ==
Dahlstrøm is now head of player development operations within the Storhamar organisation as well as serving as an expert commentator for the Norwegian TV channel TV2.
