= Trond Magnussen =

Norwegian ice hockey player

- Born: 1 February 1973 (age 53) Fredrikstad, NOR
- Height: 5 ft 9 in (175 cm)
- Weight: 187 lb (85 kg; 13 st 5 lb)
- Position: Right wing
- Shot: Left
- GET-ligaen team: Stjernen
- National team: Norway
- Playing career: 1989–2007

Trond Vegar Magnussen (born 1 February 1973) is a Norwegian former professional ice hockey player. His last tenure was with his hometown Stjernen in the GET-ligaen. He played for the Norwegian national team in multiple international tournaments, including the 1994 Winter Olympics.

== Playing career ==
Trond Magnussen has played in the top leagues in three European countries, Norway, Sweden, Germany. In Norway he played for Stjernen and Lillehammer I.K. In Sweden he has represented Frölunda Indians and Färjestads BK in the Elitserien, he also played with Leksands IF in Allsvenskan. In Germany he was with both DEG Metro Stars and Duisburg in the DEL. During his time with Färjestad he won the Swedish Championship once.

He represented Norway in eleven IIHF World Championships.

In 1995 Magnussen received the Golden Puck from the Norwegian Ice Hockey Federation.

== Career statistics ==
			Regular season					Playoffs
Season	Team	League	GP	G	A	Pts	PIM	GP	G	A	Pts	PIM
1989–90	Stjernen Hockey	Norway	39	13	12	25	27	—	—	—	—	—
1990–91	Stjernen Hockey	Norway	28	13	15	28	30	—	—	—	—	—
1991–92	Stjernen Hockey	Norway	39	17	23	40	46	—	—	—	—	—
1992–93	Västra Frölunda HC	Elitserien	20	2	1	3	4	—	—	—	—	—
1992–93	Västra Frölunda HC	Allsvenskan D1	15	3	3	6	12	3	0	0	0	0
1992–93	Västra Frölunda HC J20	Juniorallsvenskan	2	2	1	3	6	—	—	—	—	—
1993–94	Stjernen Hockey	Norway	32	27	27	54	72	4	3	3	6	—
1994–95	Lillehammer IK	Norway	34	27	19	46	26	—	—	—	—	—
1995–96	Lillehammer IK	Norway	34	13	28	41	77	—	—	—	—	—
1996–97	Lillehammer IK	Norway	39	30	39	69	44	—	—	—	—	—
1997–98	Färjestad BK	Elitserien	46	10	13	23	26	12	4	1	5	8
1998–99	Färjestad BK	Elitserien	50	10	15	25	54	4	4	0	4	8
1999–00	Färjestad BK	Elitserien	49	18	13	31	32	7	1	2	3	4
2000–01	Färjestad BK	Elitserien	45	7	17	24	26	16	7	6	13	12
2001–02	DEG Metro Stars	DEL	60	28	25	53	64	—	—	—	—	—
2002–03	DEG Metro Stars	DEL	52	18	23	41	64	5	1	1	2	10
2003–04	DEG Metro Stars	DEL	48	19	14	33	42	4	0	3	3	6
2004–05	DEG Metro Stars	DEL	18	2	3	5	18	—	—	—	—	—
2004–05	Leksands IF	Allsvenskan	17	1	1	2	6	10	2	6	8	8
2005–06	Füchse Duisburg	DEL	46	15	18	33	75	—	—	—	—	—
2006–07	Stjernen Hockey	Norway	32	11	27	38	102	6	4	4	8	43
Elitserien totals			210	47	59	106	142	39	16	9	25	32
DEL totals			224	82	83	165	263	9	1	4	5	16
Norway totals			277	151	190	341	424	10	7	7	14	43
