= Kyle McDonough =

American ice hockey player (born 1966)

- Born: February 20, 1966 (age 60) Manchester, New Hampshire, USA
- Height: 5 ft 9 in (175 cm)
- Weight: 172 lb (78 kg; 12 st 4 lb)
- Position: Center
- Shot: Right
- Played for: Vermont; Aalborg Pirates; Viking IK; Raleigh IceCaps; Murrayfield Racers; Stjernen Hockey; Huddinge IK; Frisk Asker Ishockey
- Playing career: 1985–2002

Kyle McDonough is an American ice hockey coach and former center who was an All-American for Vermont.

== Career ==
McDonough was star for Vermont for four seasons in the later half of the 1980's. Despite low totals, he led the Catamounts in scoring as a freshman, helping the team post its first winning season in six years. He continued to lead the offense for most of his career and helped Vermont make its first NCAA tournament appearance in 1988. His production increased in his senior season and he was named an All-American. Vermont reached its first ECAC championship game but lost to St. Lawrence.

After graduating, McDonough headed to Europe to begin is professional career. He had nearly the same production in the Metal Ligaen as he had in college but couldn't help Aalborg finish better than 7th in the league. He moved to the Eliteserien the following year, recording nearly two points per game for Viking IK. After a year in Norway, McDonough was on the move again and spent the bulk of the next year in Scotland. He scored over 3 points per game for the Murrayfield Racers finishing second on the team and the led the club in scoring during the postseason.

McDonough returned to Viking IK the following year and found himself with a new club each year until settling in with Frisk Asker Ishockey in 1996. McDonough found his greatest success with Frisk Asker, leading the entire league in scoring four different times. He was productive all the way until the end of his career, serving as an alternate captain every year for the club and leading them to the league championship in 2002. McDonough is currently the 7th all-time leading scorer for Norway's top league and the only non-Norwegian in the top 10.

With his playing career finished, McDonough returned to New Hampshire and began working as a teacher. He eventually found himself behind the bench of ice hockey team at his alma mater, Manchester Memorial High School. He was inducted into the Vermont Athletic Hall of Fame in 1999 and the New Hampshire Legends of Hockey in 2003.

== Happy Gilmore ==
McDonough was the inspiration for the title character in Happy Gilmore. While golfing with his friend Adam Sandler, McDonough would drive the ball much farther than the rest of the group, with the consensus being that playing ice hockey helped him in this respect. The anecdote was used as the premise for the movie. McDonough later acted in a scene for Grown Ups 2 but it was left out of the final edit.

McDonough played the role of Charles Howell's Caddie in Happy Gilmore 2.

== Statistics ==
=== Regular season and playoffs ===
			Regular Season					Playoffs
Season	Team	League	GP	G	A	Pts	PIM	GP	G	A	Pts	PIM
1985–86	Vermont	ECAC Hockey	31	13	13	26	26	—	—	—	—	—
1986–87	Vermont	ECAC Hockey	32	28	12	40	44	—	—	—	—	—
1987–88	Vermont	ECAC Hockey	32	18	22	40	40	—	—	—	—	—
1988–89	Vermont	ECAC Hockey	34	27	28	55	60	—	—	—	—	—
1989–90	Aalborg Pirates	Metal Ligaen	32	28	28	56	52	—	—	—	—	—
1990–91	Viking IK	Eliteserien	32	31	30	61	—	—	—	—	—	—
1991–92	Raleigh IceCaps	ECHL	2	1	0	1	6	—	—	—	—	—
1991–92	Murrayfield Racers	BHL	28	46	47	93	28	6	13	10	23	10
1992–93	Viking IK	Eliteserien	—	34	29	63	—	—	—	—	—	—
1994–95	Stjernen Hockey	Eliteserien	37	38	24	62	—	—	—	—	—	—
1995–96	Huddinge IK	Division 1	36	24	16	40	55	4	4	1	5	0
1996–97	Frisk Asker Ishockey	Eliteserien	39	36	48	84	119	—	—	—	—	—
1997–98	Frisk Asker Ishockey	Eliteserien	44	20	33	53	119	—	—	—	—	—
1998–99	Frisk Asker Ishockey	Eliteserien	43	33	44	77	137	—	—	—	—	—
1999–00	Frisk Asker Ishockey	Eliteserien	36	19	24	43	93	—	—	—	—	—
2000–01	Frisk Asker Ishockey	Eliteserien	40	23	53	76	141	—	—	—	—	—
2001–02	Frisk Asker Ishockey	Eliteserien	42	37	41	78	77	—	—	—	—	—
NCAA totals			129	86	75	161	170	—	—	—	—	—
Eliteserien totals			—	271	326	597	—	—	—	—	—	—

== Awards and honors ==
Award	Year
All-ECAC Hockey First Team	1988–89
AHCA East First-Team All-American	1988–89
Eliteserien All-Star	2001–02

Awards and achievements
Preceded by Sergei Pushkov; Morten Finstad; Patrik Ross	Eliteserien Scoring Champion; 1996–97; 1998–99; 2000–01 / 2001–02	Succeeded by Morten Finstad; Patrik Ross; Tommy Kiviaho
