= Dallas Gaume =

Canadian ice hockey player

- Born: August 27, 1963 (age 63) Innisfail, Alberta, Canada
- Height: 5 ft 10 in (178 cm)
- Weight: 185 lb (84 kg; 13 st 3 lb)
- Position: Centre
- Shot: Left
- Played for: Hartford Whalers
- National team: Canada
- NHL draft: Undrafted
- Playing career: 1986–1999

Dallas Gaume (born August 27, 1963) is a Canadian former professional ice hockey centre. He played in four NHL games for the Hartford Whalers during the 1988–89 season. Gaume later spent nine seasons playing in Norway with the Trondheim IK before retiring in 1999. He subsequently took up a coaching role with the major junior Red Deer Rebels before working as a scout for the team.

Gaume was born in Innisfail, Alberta. He spent four seasons in the University of Denver, leading the team with 99 points in his final year as a first team all-American. He remains Denver's all-time leading scorer with 266 career points. He signed with the Hartford Whalers as a free agent and assigned to the AHL's Binghamton Whalers where he spent four seasons. He played four regular season games for Hartford in the 1988-89 NHL season, scoring a goal and an assist.

In 1990, Gaume moved to the Norwegian Eliteserien with Trondheim IK and remained there until his retirement in 1999.

== Career statistics ==
=== Regular season and playoffs ===
| | | | Regular season | | | | | Playoffs |
| Season | Team | League | GP | G | A | Pts | PIM | GP | G | A | Pts | PIM |
|---|---|---|---|---|---|---|---|---|---|---|---|---|
| 1980–81 | Swift Current Broncos | SJHL | 55 | 25 | 47 | 72 | 24 | — | — | — | — | — |
| 1981–82 | Swift Current Broncos | SJHL | 60 | 55 | 108 | 163 | 44 | 7 | 2 | 3 | 5 | 2 |
| 1982–83 | University of Denver | WCHA | 27 | 19 | 47 | 66 | 12 | — | — | — | — | — |
| 1983–84 | University of Denver | WCHA | 32 | 12 | 26 | 38 | 22 | — | — | — | — | — |
| 1984–85 | University of Denver | WCHA | 39 | 15 | 48 | 63 | 28 | — | — | — | — | — |
| 1985–86 | University of Denver | WCHA | 47 | 32 | 67 | 99 | 18 | — | — | — | — | — |
| 1986–87 | Binghamton Whalers | AHL | 77 | 18 | 39 | 57 | 31 | 12 | 1 | 1 | 2 | 7 |
| 1987–88 | Binghamton Whalers | AHL | 63 | 24 | 49 | 73 | 39 | 4 | 1 | 2 | 3 | 0 |
| 1988–89 | Hartford Whalers | NHL | 4 | 1 | 1 | 2 | 0 | — | — | — | — | — |
| 1988–89 | Binghamton Whalers | AHL | 57 | 23 | 43 | 66 | 16 | — | — | — | — | — |
| 1989–90 | Binghamton Whalers | AHL | 76 | 26 | 39 | 65 | 43 | — | — | — | — | — |
| 1990–91 | Trondheim IK | NOR | 8 | 5 | 6 | 11 | 6 | — | — | — | — | — |
| 1991–92 | Trondheim IK | NOR | 32 | 30 | 41 | 71 | — | 4 | 4 | 2 | 6 | — |
| 1992–93 | Trondheim IK | NOR | 18 | 19 | 14 | 33 | — | — | — | — | — | — |
| 1993–94 | Trondheim IK | NOR | 32 | 25 | 36 | 61 | — | 2 | 0 | 2 | 2 | 2 |
| 1993–94 | Canadian National Team | Intl | 4 | 0 | 1 | 1 | 0 | — | — | — | — | — |
| 1994–95 | Trondheim IK | NOR | 16 | 9 | 14 | 23 | 14 | — | — | — | — | — |
| 1995–96 | Trondheim IK | NOR | 28 | 11 | 28 | 39 | 10 | 4 | 6 | 1 | 7 | 0 |
| 1995–96 | Canadian National Team | Intl | 3 | 0 | 4 | 4 | 4 | — | — | — | — | — |
| 1996–97 | Trondheim IK | NOR | 38 | 20 | 32 | 52 | — | 4 | 2 | 4 | 6 | — |
| 1997–98 | Trondheim IK | NOR | 24 | 10 | 16 | 26 | 14 | — | — | — | — | — |
| 1998–99 | Trondheim IK | NOR | 44 | 19 | 41 | 60 | 22 | — | — | — | — | — |
| NOR totals | | | 240 | 148 | 228 | 376 | 66 | 14 | 12 | 9 | 21 | 2 |
| NHL totals | | | 4 | 1 | 1 | 2 | 0 | — | — | — | — | — |

== Awards and honours ==
| Award | Year |
|---|---|
| All-WCHA First Team | 1985–86 |
| AHCA West First-Team All-American | 1985–86 |

Awards and achievements
| Preceded by Bill Watson | WCHA Most Valuable Player; 1985–86 | Succeeded by Tony Hrkac |
