= Espen Knutsen =

Norwegian ice hockey player (born 1972)

- Born: January 12, 1972 (age 54) Oslo, Norway
- Height: 6 ft 0 in (183 cm)
- Weight: 187 lb (85 kg; 13 st 5 lb)
- Position: Centre
- Shot: Left
- Played for: Vålerenga; Djurgårdens IF; Mighty Ducks of Anaheim; Columbus Blue Jackets
- National team: Norway
- NHL draft: 204th overall, 1990; Hartford Whalers
- Playing career: 1988–2005

Espen Knutsen (born January 12, 1972) is a Norwegian former professional ice hockey player and manager. He played five seasons in the North American-based National Hockey League (NHL), and is to date the only Norwegian to have played in the NHL All-Star Game. In his native Norway, Knutsen is also known by the nickname "Shampoo" because his father is a hairdresser, and also a former hockey player whose nickname was "The Soap" (Såpa in Norwegian).

In 2021, he resigned from Vålerenga's board of directors.

== Playing career ==
=== Early career ===
After being drafted by the Hartford Whalers in the 10th round (204th overall) in 1990, Knutsen remained in Europe until 1997, playing for his hometown team Vålerenga, and later Djurgården of the Swedish Elitserien. In 1996, the Mighty Ducks of Anaheim acquired his rights, and he made his debut with the Ducks in 1997. After a disappointing season (playing in part for the American Hockey League (AHL) Cincinnati Mighty Ducks), Knutsen returned to Djurgården. During the 1999–00 season, he was the highest paid player in the Elitserien, earning a salary of $280,000.

=== NHL career ===
Knutsen got a second chance in the NHL in 2000, when he signed with the Columbus Blue Jackets on the recommendation of assistant coach George Kingston, who had previously coached the Norwegian national team. In a very good first season, Knutsen tallied 53 points (11 goals, 42 assists) in 66 games. His numbers dropped a little the next season, but he was nonetheless named to the World Team (as an injury replacement) in the 2002 All-Star Game (making him the first Norwegian ever to play in the NHL All-Star Game). The 2002–03 and 2003–04 seasons were disappointing for Knutsen, who spent large parts of the seasons on the injured list. He left the NHL in early 2004, shortly after being assigned to Columbus' AHL affiliate, the Syracuse Crunch, and once again returned to Djurgården.

=== Retirement ===
Knutsen retired because of injury in July 2005. At the news of his retirement, the general manager of Djurgården, Tommy Engström, called him one of the greatest players in the history of the club. After his retirement, Knutsen moved back to his native Oslo, where he lives with his family. He was appointed head coach of his childhood club Vålerenga in 2006, a position he held until the summer of 2016 when he became the club's general manager.

== Fan death ==
In a March 2002 game against the Calgary Flames in Nationwide Arena, Knutsen took a shot that deflected off Flames defenseman Derek Morris' stick and accidentally struck 13-year-old Brittanie Cecil in the head, which resulted in her death 48 hours later. Knutsen later helped set up a charity in Columbus to honor Cecil's memory. Also as a result of the incident, the NHL made it mandatory to install protective nylon mesh nets above the glass behind both goals. In December 2010, Knutsen met with Cecil's family, bringing some closure to both parties.

== Career statistics ==
=== Regular season and playoffs ===
			Regular season					Playoffs
Season	Team	League	GP	G	A	Pts	PIM	GP	G	A	Pts	PIM
1988–89	Vålerenga	NOR	36	14	7	21	18	—	—	—	—	—
1989–90	Vålerenga	NOR	40	25	28	53	44	—	—	—	—	—
1990–91	Vålerenga	NOR	31	30	24	54	42	—	—	—	—	—
1991–92	Vålerenga	NOR	30	28	26	54	37	—	—	—	—	—
1992–93	Vålerenga	NOR	13	11	13	24	4	—	—	—	—	—
1993–94	Vålerenga	NOR	38	32	26	58	20	—	—	—	—	—
1994–95	Djurgårdens IF	SEL	30	6	14	20	18	3	0	1	1	0
1995–96	Djurgårdens IF	SEL	32	10	23	33	50	4	1	0	1	2
1996–97	Djurgårdens IF	SEL	39	16	33	49	20	4	2	4	6	6
1997–98	Cincinnati Mighty Ducks	AHL	41	4	13	17	18	—	—	—	—	—
1997–98	Mighty Ducks of Anaheim	NHL	19	3	0	3	6	—	—	—	—	—
1998–99	Djurgårdens IF	SEL	39	18	24	42	32	4	0	1	1	2
1999–2000	Djurgårdens IF	SEL	48	18	35	53	65	13	5	16	21	2
2000–01	Columbus Blue Jackets	NHL	66	11	42	53	30	—	—	—	—	—
2001–02	Columbus Blue Jackets	NHL	77	11	31	42	47	—	—	—	—	—
2002–03	Columbus Blue Jackets	NHL	31	5	4	9	20	—	—	—	—	—
2003–04	Columbus Blue Jackets	NHL	14	0	4	4	2	—	—	—	—	—
2003–04	Syracuse Crunch	AHL	2	1	1	2	0	—	—	—	—	—
2003–04	Vålerenga	NOR	1	0	0	0	4	—	—	—	—	—
2003–04	Djurgårdens IF	SEL	6	2	3	5	4	3	0	0	0	6
2004–05	Djurgårdens IF	SEL	15	0	8	8	12	—	—	—	—	—
NOR totals			189	140	124	264	169	—	—	—	—	—
SEL totals			209	70	140	210	201	31	8	22	30	18
NHL totals			207	30	81	111	105	—	—	—	—	—

=== International ===
Year	Team	Event	GP	G	A	Pts	PIM
1989	Norway	EJC	5	8	4	12	10
1989	Norway	WJC	7	0	2	2	10
1990	Norway	EJC	6	6	11	17	10
1990	Norway	WJC	7	2	7	9	6
1991	Norway	WJC	6	1	2	3	0
1994	Norway	OG	7	1	3	4	2
1994	Norway	WC	6	3	2	5	0
1995	Norway	WC	5	2	1	3	0
1996	Norway	WC	5	3	0	3	0
1997	Norway	WC	8	0	5	5	4
2003	Norway	WC D1	5	4	5	9	8
2005	Norway	OGQ	2	0	2	2	2
Junior totals			31	17	26	43	36
Senior totals			31	9	11	20	6
