= Tore Vikingstad =

Norwegian ice hockey player

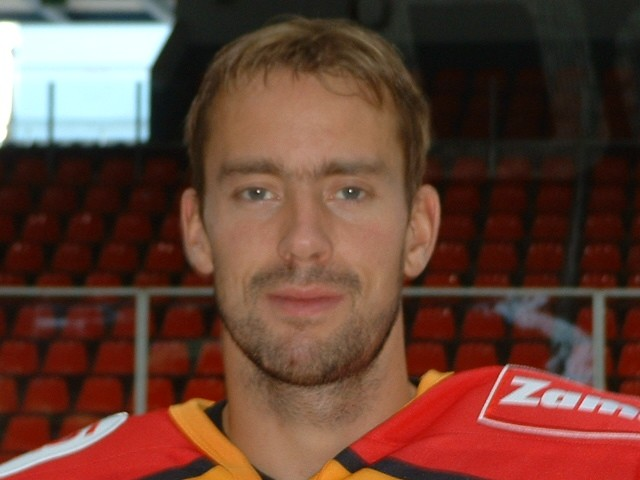
- Born: 8 October 1975 (age 50) Trondheim, NOR
- Height: 6 ft 3 in (191 cm)
- Weight: 204 lb (93 kg; 14 st 8 lb)
- Position: Center
- Shot: Left
- Played for: Viking; Stjernen; Färjestad; Leksand; DEG Metro Stars; Hannover Scorpions; Stavanger Oilers
- National team: Norway
- NHL draft: 180th overall, 1999; St. Louis Blues
- Playing career: 1993–2013

Tore Vikingstad (born 8 October 1975) is a retired Norwegian professional ice hockey player.

== Career ==
=== Club career ===
He played for Viking and Stjernen in Norway, then Färjestad and Leksand in Sweden until 2001. He was selected by the St. Louis Blues in the sixth round, 180th overall, in the 1999 NHL entry draft.

A stint in the DEG Metro Stars from 2001 to 2008 was followed by three seasons in the Hannover Scorpions. In the 2005-2006 season of the Deutsche Eishockey Liga, he was named MVP and also became the top scorer in the same season with a total of 71 points. That accomplishment also led to Vikingstad being named the best Norwegian ice hockey player of 2005-06, earning him the Golden Puck award.

He returned to Norway Stavanger Oilers, and retired in 2013 after winning the domestic cup.

=== International career ===
In the 2010 Winter Olympics at Vancouver, Vikingstad scored a hat trick against Switzerland on February 20 during pool play.

== Post-playing career ==
In June 2013 he was elected to the board of the Norwegian Ice Hockey Association.

== Career statistics ==
=== Regular season and playoffs ===
			Regular season					Playoffs
Season	Team	League	GP	G	A	Pts	PIM	GP	G	A	Pts	PIM
1993–94	Viking IK	NOR	2	0	0	0	0	—	—	—	—	—
1994–95	Viking IK	NOR	32	6	5	11	10	—	—	—	—	—
1995–96	Viking IK	NOR	27	12	11	23	22	—	—	—	—	—
1996–97	Stjernen	NOR	32	23	35	58	20	3	0	1	1	0
1997–98	Stjernen	NOR	42	26	31	57	18	—	—	—	—	—
1998–99	Färjestad BK	SEL	49	9	11	20	18	4	2	3	5	0
1999–2000	Färjestad BK	SEL	47	8	19	27	26	7	3	0	3	6
2000–01	Leksands IF	SEL	41	10	15	25	24	—	—	—	—	—
2001–02	DEG Metro Stars	DEL	58	18	30	48	6	—	—	—	—	—
2002–03	DEG Metro Stars	DEL	45	13	18	31	40	5	1	0	1	0
2003–04	DEG Metro Stars	DEL	50	9	21	30	38	4	1	2	3	2
2004–05	DEG Metro Stars	DEL	28	11	14	25	16	—	—	—	—	—
2005–06	DEG Metro Stars	DEL	52	23	41	64	36	14	7	6	13	22
2006–07	DEG Metro Stars	DEL	41	14	25	39	20	4	0	0	0	0
2007–08	DEG Metro Stars	DEL	41	6	10	16	16	13	4	4	8	14
2008–09	Hannover Scorpions	DEL	43	13	36	49	44	11	4	4	8	6
2009–10	Hannover Scorpions	DEL	51	14	50	64	49	11	0	8	8	2
2010–11	Hannover Scorpions	DEL	52	9	41	50	48	5	3	2	5	4
2011–12	Stavanger Oilers	NOR	12	3	11	14	6	—	—	—	—	—
2012–13	Stavanger Oilers	NOR	7	1	10	11	2	14	2	8	10	6
NOR totals			154	71	103	174	78	17	2	9	11	6
SEL totals			137	27	45	72	68	20	8	6	14	22
DEL totals			461	130	286	416	313	67	20	26	46	50

=== International ===
Year	Team	Event	GP	G	A	Pts	PIM
1995	Norway	WJC B	7	3	1	4	4
1997	Norway	WC	8	0	1	1	6
1998	Norway	WC B	7	0	5	5	6
1999	Norway	WC	6	1	2	3	2
1999	Norway	WC Q	3	1	3	4	0
2000	Norway	WC	6	3	2	5	10
2001	Norway	OGQ	1	0	0	0	0
2001	Norway	WC	6	1	1	2	10
2002	Norway	WC D1	5	1	4	5	0
2003	Norway	WC D1	5	1	2	3	2
2004	Norway	WC D1	5	2	6	8	4
2005	Norway	OGQ	6	5	7	12	4
2005	Norway	WC D1	5	4	4	8	2
2006	Norway	WC	6	1	5	6	10
2009	Norway	OGQ	3	3	3	6	0
2009	Norway	WC	6	1	3	4	10
2010	Norway	OG	4	4	0	4	4
Senior totals			82	28	48	76	70
