= 1978–79 Norwegian 1. Divisjon season =

Norwegian ice hockey league season

The 1978–79 Norwegian 1. Divisjon season was the 40th season of ice hockey in Norway. Ten teams participated in the league, and Frisk Asker won the championship.

== First round ==
	Club	GP	W	T	L	GF–GA	Pts
1.	Furuset IF	18	13	1	4	110:55	27
2.	Manglerud Star Ishockey	18	13	0	5	76:63	26
3.	Vålerenga Ishockey	18	11	2	5	83:54	24
4.	Frisk Asker	18	11	1	6	114:63	23
5.	Stjernen	18	11	0	7	92:83	22
6.	Hasle-Løren Idrettslag	18	10	1	7	102:92	21
7.	Forward Flyers	18	7	1	10	86:89	15
8.	Viking IK	18	4	1	13	66:95	9
9.	Sparta Sarpsborg	18	4	1	13	63:115	9
10.	Storhamar Ishockey	18	2	0	16	51:134	4

Source: Elite Prospects

== Second round ==
=== Final round ===
	Club	GP	W	T	L	GF–GA	Pts
1.	Frisk Asker	10	9	1	0	67:27	19
2.	Stjernen	10	4	3	3	44:42	11
3.	Hasle-Løren Idrettslag	10	4	1	5	58:59	9
4.	Vålerenga Ishockey	10	3	2	5	33:46	8
5.	Manglerud Star Ishockey	10	3	1	6	39:47	7
6.	Furuset IF	10	1	4	5	31:51	6

=== Relegation round ===
	Club	GP	W	T	L	GF–GA	Pts
7.	Viking IK	6	5	0	1	27:14	13
8.	Sparta Sarpsborg	6	3	0	3	25:17	6
9.	Forward Flyers	6	3	0	3	37:32	6
10.	Storhamar Ishockey	6	1	0	5	17:43	2

==== 8th place tiebreaker ====
- Forward Flyers - Sparta Sarpsborg 5:3
