= 1981–82 Norwegian 1. Divisjon season =

Norwegian ice hockey league season

The 1981–82 Norwegian 1. Divisjon season was the 43rd season of ice hockey in Norway. Ten teams participated in the league, and Valerenga Ishockey won the championship.

== Regular season ==
| | Club | GP | W | T | L | GF–GA | Pts |
|---|---|---|---|---|---|---|---|
| 1. | Vålerenga Ishockey | 36 | 29 | 3 | 4 | 266:123 | 61 |
| 2. | Furuset IF | 36 | 22 | 6 | 8 | 226:124 | 50 |
| 3. | Manglerud Star Ishockey | 36 | 21 | 6 | 9 | 224:136 | 48 |
| 4. | Viking IK | 36 | 21 | 5 | 10 | 188:120 | 47 |
| 5. | Stjernen | 36 | 19 | 5 | 12 | 163:151 | 43 |
| 6. | Frisk Asker | 36 | 15 | 6 | 15 | 178:163 | 36 |
| 7. | Sparta Sarpsborg | 36 | 15 | 6 | 15 | 160:165 | 36 |
| 8. | Djerv SK | 36 | 6 | 8 | 22 | 131:252 | 20 |
| 9. | Hasle-Løren Idrettslag | 36 | 7 | 0 | 29 | 124:237 | 14 |
| 10. | Lambertseter | 36 | 1 | 1 | 34 | 120:309 | 3 |

Source: Elite Prospects

== Playoffs ==
Semi-finals
Vålerenga Ishockey | 2
Viking IK | 0
Furuset IF | 1
Manglerud Star | 2

Final
Vålerenga Ishockey | 2
Manglerud Star | 0
Third place
Viking IK | 0
Furuset IF | 2
