= 1977–78 Norwegian 1. Divisjon season =

Norwegian ice hockey league season

The 1977–78 Norwegian 1. Divisjon season was the 39th season of ice hockey in Norway. Ten teams participated in the league, and Manglerud Star won the championship.

== First round ==
	Club	GP	W	T	L	GF–GA	Pts
1.	Frisk Asker	18	16	0	2	141:65	32
2.	Manglerud Star Ishockey	18	14	0	4	116:76	28
3.	Hasle-Løren Idrettslag	18	13	1	4	162:69	27
4.	Vålerenga Ishockey	18	11	2	5	125:76	24
5.	Sparta Sarpsborg	18	10	1	7	106:95	21
6.	Stjernen	18	10	0	8	74:75	20
7.	Furuset IF	18	6	2	10	71:74	14
8.	Lambertseter	18	4	1	13	89:134	9
9.	Storhamar Ishockey	18	2	2	14	55:132	6
10.	Jar IL	18	0	1	17	56:199	1

Source: Elite Prospects

== Second round ==
=== Final round ===
	Club	GP	W	T	L	GF–GA	Pts
1.	Manglerud Star Ishockey	10	7	1	2	52:31	15
2.	Hasle-Løren Idrettslag	10	6	0	4	48:40	12
3.	Stjernen	10	5	1	4	49:46	11
4.	Frisk Asker	10	5	0	5	40:31	10
5.	Vålerenga Ishockey	10	3	1	6	47:59	7
6.	Sparta Sarpsborg	10	2	1	7	30:59	5

=== Relegation round ===
	Club	GP	W	T	L	GF–GA	Pts
7.	Furuset IF	6	5	1	0	54:12	11
8.	Storhamar Ishockey	6	3	1	2	36:28	7
9.	Lambertseter	6	2	0	4	22:35	3
10.	Jar IL	6	1	0	5	16:53	2
