= 1983–84 Norwegian 1. Divisjon season =

Norwegian ice hockey league season

The 1983–84 Norwegian 1. Divisjon season was the 45th season of ice hockey in Norway. Eight teams participated in the league, and Sparta Sarpsborg won the championship.

== Regular season ==
	Club	GP	W	T	L	GF–GA	Pts
1.	Sparta Sarpsborg	28	18	4	6	138:104	40
2.	Vålerenga Ishockey	28	17	2	9	146:94	36
3.	Stjernen	28	16	3	9	142:118	35
4.	Furuset IF	28	15	2	11	153:121	32
5.	Manglerud Star Ishockey	28	12	5	11	133:111	29
6.	Frisk Asker	28	12	4	12	127:137	26
7.	Storhamar Ishockey	28	5	4	19	101:176	14
8.	Viking IK	28	3	4	21	103:182	10

Source: Elite Prospects

== Playoffs ==
Semi-finals
Sparta Sarpsborg	2
Stjernen	1
Vålerenga Ishockey	2
Furuset IF	0

Final
Sparta Sarpsborg	2
Vålerenga Ishockey	1
Third place
Stjernen	0
Furuset IF	1

== Relegation ==
- Storhamar Ishockey - Strindheim IL 2:0 (10:1, 14:1)
