= 1986–87 Norwegian 1. Divisjon season =

Norwegian ice hockey league season

The 1986–87 Norwegian 1. Divisjon season was the 48th season of ice hockey in Norway. Ten teams participated in the league, and Valerenga Ishockey won the championship.

== Regular season ==
	Club	GP	W	T	L	GF–GA	Pts
1.	Stjernen	36	25	1	10	225:139	51
2.	Vålerenga Ishockey	36	23	3	10	228:150	49
3.	Sparta Sarpsborg	36	22	2	12	167:144	46
4.	Frisk Asker	36	20	1	15	172:122	41
5.	Storhamar Ishockey	36	17	2	17	181:157	36
6.	Furuset IF	36	16	2	18	177:159	34
7.	Manglerud Star Ishockey	36	16	2	18	164:159	34
8.	Bergen/Djerv	36	16	1	19	178:229	33
9.	Viking IK	36	9	1	26	162:242	19
10.	Hasle-Løren Idrettslag	36	8	1	27	144:297	17

Source: Elite Prospects

== Playoffs ==
Semi-finals
Stjernen	2
Sparta Sarpsborg	0
Vålerenga Ishockey	2
Frisk Asker	0

Final
Stjernen	1
Vålerenga Ishockey	3
Third place
Not played
