= Anders Broström =

Swedish ice hockey player

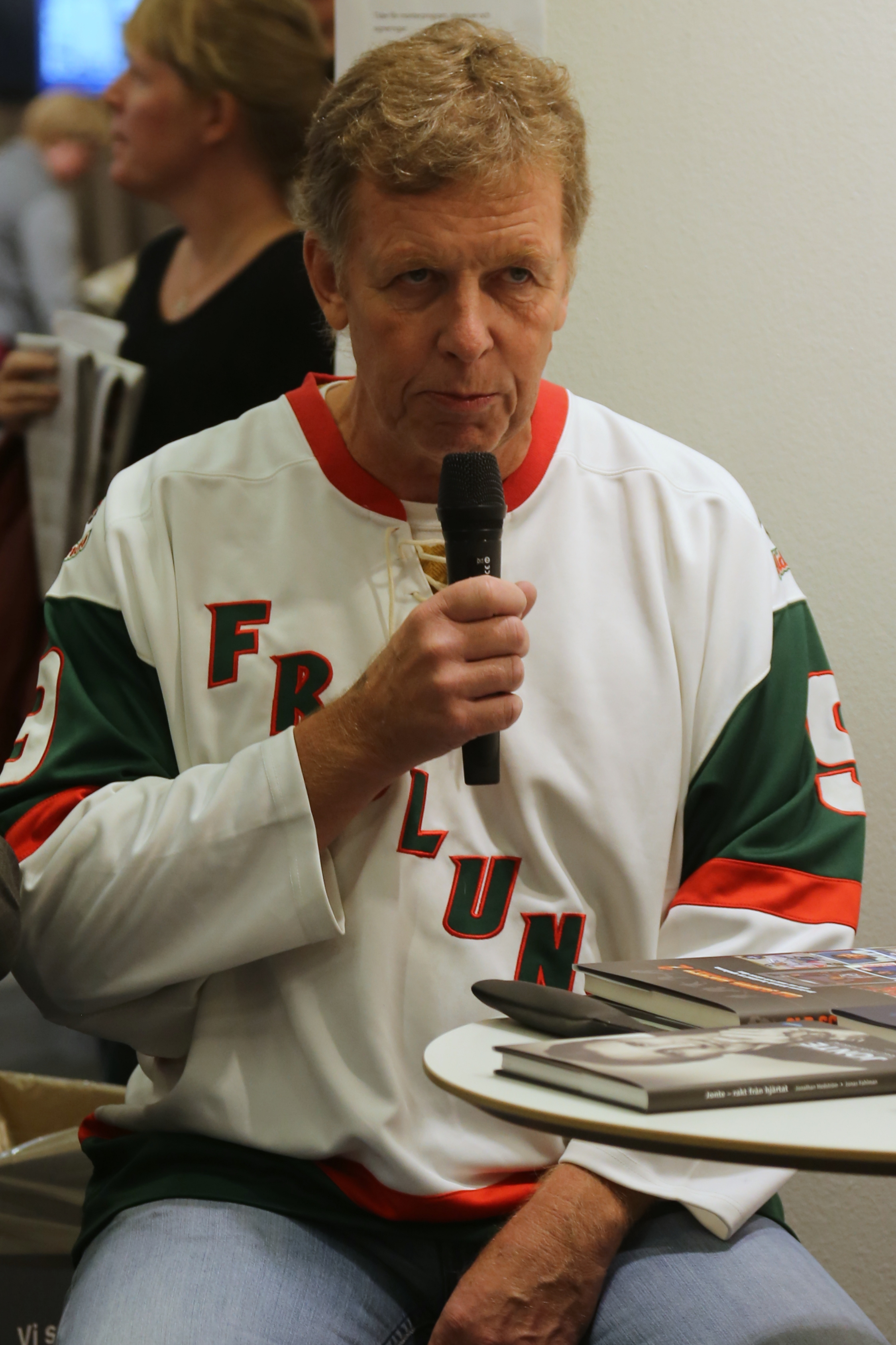
- Born: 18 September 1952 (age 73) Ronneby, SWE
- Height: 6 ft 4 in (193 cm)
- Weight: 218 lb (99 kg; 15 st 8 lb)
- Position: Defence
- Shot: Right
- Played for: Frölunda HC
- National team: Sweden
- Playing career: 1970–1988

Anders Broström (born 18 September 1952 in Ronneby, Sweden) is a retired Swedish ice hockey player.

Broström began with career with Tingsryds AIF in 1970. He joined Frölunda HC in 1976 and remained with the team until 1984. He had a spell in Norway with Sparta Warriors before finishing his career in the Swedish lower league. The Boston Bruins of the National Hockey League signed him to a contract in 1981 though he never played in North America. He made seven appearances for in the Swedish national men's ice hockey team.

== Career statistics ==
			Regular season					Playoffs
Season	Team	League	GP	G	A	Pts	PIM	GP	G	A	Pts	PIM
1967–68	Kallinge SK	Division 3	—	—	—	—	—	—	—	—	—	—
1968–69	Kallinge SK	Division 3	—	0	—	—	—	—	—	—	—	—
1969–70	Kallinge SK	Division 3	18	4	—	—	—	—	—	—	—	—
1970–71	Tingsryds AIF J20	Juniorserien	—	—	—	—	—	—	—	—	—	—
1970–71	Tingsryds AIF	Division 1	13	0	2	2	8	—	—	—	—	—
1971–72	Tingsryds AIF J20	Juniorserien	—	—	—	—	—	—	—	—	—	—
1971–72	Tingsryds AIF	Division 1	18	2	3	5	10	—	—	—	—	—
1972–73	Tingsryds AIF	Division 1	20	0	2	2	16	—	—	—	—	—
1973–74	Tingsryds AIF	Division 1	24	1	1	2	22	—	—	—	—	—
1974–75	Tingsryds AIF	Division 1	29	6	10	16	82	—	—	—	—	—
1975–76	Tingsryds AIF	Division 1	22	1	5	6	34	—	—	—	—	—
1976–77	Västra Frölunda IF	Elitserien	22	1	5	6	40	—	—	—	—	—
1977–78	Västra Frölunda IF	Elitserien	36	5	11	16	70	—	—	—	—	—
1978–79	Västra Frölunda IF	Elitserien	36	12	13	25	98	—	—	—	—	—
1979–80	Västra Frölunda IF	Elitserien	36	17	8	25	100	8	3	2	5	16
1980–81	Västra Frölunda IF	Elitserien	29	9	6	15	84	2	0	0	0	16
1981–82	Västra Frölunda IF	Elitserien	29	9	9	18	84	—	—	—	—	—
1982–83	Västra Frölunda IF	Elitserien	23	6	8	14	90	—	—	—	—	—
1983–84	Västra Frölunda IF	Elitserien	24	3	7	10	74	—	—	—	—	—
1984–85	Sparta Sarpsborg	Norway	21	8	18	26	48	—	—	—	—	—
1985–86	Sparta Sarpsborg	Norway	32	12	33	45	54	—	—	—	—	—
1986–87	Mölndals IF	Division 1	22	4	10	14	34	—	—	—	—	—
1987–88	Lerums BK	Division 3	—	—	—	—	—	—	—	—	—	—
Elitserien totals			235	62	67	129	640	10	3	2	5	32
Norway totals			53	20	51	71	102	—	—	—	—	—
Division 1 totals			148	14	33	47	206	—	—	—	—	—
