= 1985–86 Norwegian 1. Divisjon season =

Norwegian ice hockey league season

The 1985–86 Norwegian 1. Divisjon season was the 47th season of ice hockey in Norway. Ten teams participated in the league, and Stjernen won the championship.

== Regular season ==
	Club	GP	W	T	L	GF–GA	Pts
1.	Sparta Sarpsborg	36	26	5	5	257:134	57
2.	Stjernen	36	25	0	11	259:162	50
3.	Frisk Asker	36	21	3	12	229:141	45
4.	Storhamar Ishockey	36	22	1	13	208:144	45
5.	Vålerenga Ishockey	36	19	6	11	170:135	44
6.	Furuset IF	36	17	6	13	167:183	40
7.	Manglerud Star Ishockey	36	15	3	18	158:162	33
8.	Viking IK	36	11	4	21	139:184	26
9.	Hasle-Løren Idrettslag	36	5	1	30	102:242	11
10.	Forward Flyers	36	4	1	31	122:325	9

Source: Elite Prospects

== Playoffs ==
Semi-finals
Stjernen	2
Storhamar Ishockey	0
Sparta Sarpsborg	1
Frisk Asker	2

Final
Stjernen	3
Frisk Asker	0
Third place
Not played

== Kvalserien ==
	Club	GP	W	T	L	GF–GA	Pts
1.	Hasle-Løren Idrettslag	5	4	1	0	22:9	9
2.	SK Djerv	5	3	1	1	29:14	7
3.	Forward Flyers	5	1	1	3	12:27	3
4.	Bergen	5	0	1	4	13:26	1
