= List of Stjernen Hockey seasons =

Stjernen Hockey are a Norwegian ice hockey club based in Fredrikstad. They are members of the highest Norwegian ice hockey league, Eliteserien (known as GET-ligaen for sponsorship reasons). Stjernen were officially founded in 1960 (65 years ago) as the hockey department of the sports club IL Stjernen, but their origins lie with the Stars, a boys' club that had appeared one year earlier. As of 2010, they have completed thirty-six consecutive seasons in the Eliteserien, winning over 630 regular season games and one league title.

Stjernen played their first competitive match in December 1960 and entered the league system ahead of the 1961–62 season, starting out in the 3. divisjon (fourth tier). Fourteen years later, they were promoted to the 1. divisjon (Eliteserien from 1990 onwards), where they have played since. The club rose to prominence in the 1980s, winning the Norwegian Championship in 1981 and 1986. They reached the Finals again in 1987, and twice more during the 1990s. Since 2000, however, they have failed to qualify for the playoffs four times, and have only advanced to the semi-finals on three occasions.

== Seasons ==
| Norwegian Champions | Regular Season Champions | Promoted | Relegated |

| Season | League | Division | Regular season^{[a]} | | | | | | | | | | Postseason^{[a]} | | | | | | | |
| Season | League | Division | GP | W | L | T | OTW | OTL | GF | GA | Pts | Finish | GP | W | L | T | GF | GA | Pts | Result |
|---|---|---|---|---|---|---|---|---|---|---|---|---|---|---|---|---|---|---|---|---|
| 1961–62 | 3. divisjon | C | 8 | | | | — | — | | | | 3rd | Did not qualify | | | | | | | |
| 1962–63 | 3. divisjon | | | | | | — | — | | | | | | | | | | | | |
| 1963–64^{[b]} | 3. divisjon | E | | | | | — | — | | | | | | | | | | | | |
| 1964–65 | 3. divisjon | E | 5 | 1 | 4 | 0 | — | — | 9 | 20 | 2 | 3rd | Did not qualify | | | | | | | |
| 1965–66 | 3. divisjon | E | | | | | — | — | | | | 1st | 5 | | | | | | | |
| 1966–67 | 2. divisjon | A | 10 | 5 | 4 | 1 | — | — | 28 | 32 | 11 | 3rd | Did not qualify | | | | | | | |
| 1967–68 | 2. divisjon | B | 10 | 4 | 5 | 1 | — | — | 27 | 37 | 9 | 4th | Did not qualify | | | | | | | |
| 1968–69 | 2. divisjon | B | 10 | 6 | 3 | 1 | — | — | 42 | 24 | 13 | 3rd | Did not qualify | | | | | | | |
| 1969–70 | 2. divisjon | B | 10 | 3 | 5 | 2 | — | — | 35 | 52 | 8 | 4th | Did not qualify | | | | | | | |
| 1970–71 | 2. divisjon | A | 10 | 3 | 6 | 1 | — | — | 34 | 52 | 7 | 5th | 4 | 3 | 1 | 0 | 25 | 16 | 6 | 1st in Qualifying for 2. divisjon |
| 1971–72 | 2. divisjon | | | | | | — | — | | | | | | | | | | | | |
| 1972–73 | 2. divisjon | B | 10 | 6 | 2 | 2 | — | — | 46 | 24 | 14 | 2nd | 10 | 3 | 7 | 0 | 24 | 53 | 6 | 4th in Qualifying for 1. divisjon |
| 1973–74 | 2. divisjon | | 18 | 14 | 4 | 0 | — | — | 94 | 41 | 28 | 2nd | | | | | | | | |
| 1974–75 | 1. divisjon | | 18 | 10 | 7 | 1 | — | — | 65 | 70 | 21 | 5th | 10 | 3 | 6 | 1 | 39 | 64 | 7 | 6th in Norwegian Championship |
| 1975–76 | 1. divisjon | | 18 | 7 | 9 | 2 | — | — | 73 | 82 | 16 | 7th | Did not qualify | | | | | | | |
| 1976–77 | 1. divisjon | | 18 | 10 | 5 | 3 | — | — | 105 | 78 | 23 | 5th | 10 | 1 | 9 | 0 | 34 | 75 | 2 | 5th in Norwegian Championship |
| 1977–78 | 1. divisjon | | 18 | 10 | 8 | 0 | — | — | 74 | 75 | 20 | 6th | 10 | 5 | 4 | 1 | 49 | 46 | 11 | 3rd in Norwegian Championship |
| 1978–79 | 1. divisjon | | 18 | 11 | 7 | 0 | — | — | 92 | 83 | 22 | 5th | 10 | 4 | 3 | 3 | 44 | 42 | 11 | 2nd in Norwegian Championship |
| 1979–80 | 1. divisjon | | 27 | 9 | 15 | 3 | — | — | 110 | 123 | 21 | 7th | Did not qualify | | | | | | | |
| 1980–81 | 1. divisjon | | 36 | 22 | 11 | 3 | — | — | 207 | 117 | 47 | 3rd | 5 | 3 | 1 | 1 | 21 | 12 | — | Won in Semi-finals, 1–1–1 (Frisk); Won Norwegian Championship, 2–0 (Vålerenga) |
| 1981–82 | 1. divisjon | | 36 | 19 | 12 | 5 | — | — | 163 | 151 | 43 | 5th | Did not qualify | | | | | | | |
| 1982–83 | 1. divisjon | | 36 | 13 | 20 | 3 | — | — | 152 | 174 | 29 | 8th | Did not qualify | | | | | | | |
| 1983–84 | 1. divisjon | | 28 | 16 | 9 | 3 | — | — | 142 | 118 | 35 | 3rd | 5 | 1 | 3 | 1 | 21 | 25 | — | Lost in Semi-finals, 1–2 (Sparta); Lost Bronze medal games, 5–8, 3–3 (Furuset) |
| 1984–85 | 1. divisjon | | 18 | 11 | 7 | 0 | — | — | 96 | 65 | 22 | 5th | Did not qualify | | | | | | | |
| 1984–85 | Mellomspillet^{[c]} | | 10 | 2 | 8 | 0 | — | — | 44 | 65 | 4 | 6th | Did not qualify | | | | | | | |
| 1985–86 | 1. divisjon | | 36 | 25 | 11 | 0 | — | — | 259 | 162 | 50 | 2nd | 5 | 5 | 0 | — | 24 | 12 | — | Won in Semi-finals, 2–0 (Storhamar); Won Norwegian Championship, 3–0 (Frisk) |
| 1986–87 | 1. divisjon | | 36 | 25 | 10 | 1 | — | — | 225 | 139 | 51 | 1st | 6 | 3 | 3 | — | 22 | 28 | — | Won in Semi-finals, 2–0 (Sparta); Lost in Finals, 1–3 (Vålerenga) |
| 1987–88 | 1. divisjon | | 36 | 14 | 20 | 2 | — | — | 165 | 189 | 30 | 7th | Did not qualify | | | | | | | |
| 1988–89 | 1. divisjon | | 36 | 21 | 13 | 2 | — | — | 182 | 154 | 44 | 3rd | 3 | 1 | 2 | — | 10 | 12 | — | Lost in Semi-finals, 1–2 (Trondheim) |
| 1989–90 | 1. divisjon | | 36 | 23 | 10 | 3 | — | — | 218 | 148 | 49 | 4th | 3 | 1 | 2 | — | 16 | 23 | — | Lost in Semi-finals, 1–2 (Furuset) |
| 1990–91^{[d]} | Eliteserien I | | 18 | 13 | 5 | 0 | — | — | 92 | 58 | 26 | 3rd | 3 | 1 | 2 | — | 12 | 18 | — | Lost in Semi-finals, 1–2 (Furuset) |
| 1990–91^{[d]} | Eliteserien II^{[e]} | | 32 | 20 | 8 | 4 | — | — | 151 | 106 | 44 | 3rd | 3 | 1 | 2 | — | 12 | 18 | — | Lost in Semi-finals, 1–2 (Furuset) |
| 1991–92 | Eliteserien I | | 18 | 8 | 9 | 1 | — | — | 74 | 57 | 17 | 6th | 2 | 1 | 1 | — | 7 | 10 | 2 | 2nd in Quarter-finals |
| 1991–92 | Eliteserien II | | 14 | 8 | 4 | 2 | — | — | 73 | 55 | 18 | 2nd | 5 | 2 | 3 | — | 12 | 16 | — | Won in Semi-finals, 2–0 (Trondheim); Lost in Finals, 0–3 (Vålerenga) |
| 1992–93 | Eliteserien I | | 18 | 14 | 2 | 2 | — | — | 93 | 56 | 30 | 2nd | 2 | 0 | 2 | — | 5 | 11 | 0 | 3rd in Quarter-finals |
| 1992–93 | Eliteserien II | | 14 | 8 | 5 | 1 | — | — | 67 | 54 | 20 | 3rd | 2 | 0 | 2 | — | 5 | 11 | 0 | 3rd in Quarter-finals |
| 1993–94 | Eliteserien I | | 18 | 10 | 6 | 2 | — | — | 75 | 67 | 22 | 4th | 2 | 1 | 1 | — | 14 | 8 | 2 | 2nd in Quarter-finals |
| 1993–94 | Eliteserien II | | 14 | 7 | 6 | 1 | — | — | 66 | 55 | 15 | 4th | 2 | 0 | 2 | — | 5 | 9 | — | Lost in Semi-finals, 0–2 (Storhamar) |
| 1994–95 | Eliteserien | | 28 | 13 | 12 | 3 | — | — | 134 | 124 | 29 | 5th | 4 | 3 | 1 | — | 19 | 16 | 6 | 1st in Quarter-finals |
| 1994–95 | Eliteserien | | 28 | 13 | 12 | 3 | — | — | 134 | 124 | 29 | 5th | 5 | 2 | 3 | — | 14 | 23 | — | Won in Semi-finals, 2–0 (Lillehammer); Lost in Finals, 0–3 (Storhamar) |
| 1995–96 | Eliteserien | | 28 | 19 | 7 | 2 | — | — | 140 | 94 | 40 | 2nd | 4 | 3 | 1 | — | 18 | 16 | 6 | 1st in Quarter-finals |
| 1995–96 | Eliteserien | | 28 | 19 | 7 | 2 | — | — | 140 | 94 | 40 | 2nd | 3 | 0 | 3 | — | 5 | 16 | — | Lost in Semi-finals, 0–3 (Vålerenga) |
| 1996–97 | Eliteserien | | 36 | 20 | 14 | 2 | — | — | 153 | 133 | 42 | 5th | 7 | 3 | 4 | — | 26 | 27 | — | Won in Quarter-finals, 3–1 (Trondheim); Lost in Semi-finals, 0–3 (Storhamar) |
| 1997–98 | Eliteserien | | 44 | 23 | 17 | 4 | — | — | 172 | 149 | 50 | 3rd | 3 | 0 | 3 | — | 5 | 9 | — | Lost in Semi-finals, 0–3 (Storhamar) |
| 1998–99 | Eliteserien | | 44 | 27 | 14 | 3 | — | — | 190 | 112 | 57 | 3rd | 3 | 0 | 3 | — | 9 | 19 | — | Lost in Semi-finals, 0–3 (Vålerenga) |
| 1999–2000 | Eliteserien | | 38 | 15 | 19 | 4 | — | — | 99 | 119 | 34 | 6th | Did not qualify | | | | | | | |
| 2000–01 | Eliteserien | | 42 | 19 | 21 | 2 | — | — | 136 | 154 | 40 | 6th | Did not qualify | | | | | | | |
| 2001–02 | Eliteserien | | 42 | 14 | 26 | 2 | — | — | 123 | 150 | 30 | 8th | 10 | 8 | 1 | 1 | 50 | 26 | 17 | 1st in Qualifying for Eliteserien |
| 2002–03^{[f]} | Eliteserien | | 38 | 15 | 14 | — | 6 | 3 | 151 | 134 | 60 | 5th | 3 | 1 | 2 | — | 10 | 9 | — | Lost in Quarter-finals, 1–2 (Trondheim) |
| 2003–04 | Eliteserien | | 42 | 16 | 18 | — | 6 | 2 | 152 | 137 | 62 | 7th | 4 | 1 | 3 | — | 7 | 17 | — | Lost in Quarter-finals, 1–3 (Vålerenga) |
| 2004–05 | Eliteserien | | 42 | 22 | 14 | — | 4 | 2 | 144 | 113 | 76 | 4th | 7 | 3 | 4 | — | 26 | 32 | — | Won in Quarter-finals, 3–1 (Frisk); Lost in Semi-finals, 0–3 (Vålerenga) |
| 2005–06 | Eliteserien | | 42 | 23 | 10 | — | 1 | 8 | 177 | 129 | 79 | 2nd | 12 | 7 | 5 | — | 45 | 31 | — | Won in Quarter-finals, 4–1 (Lillehammer); Lost in Semi-finals, 3–4 (Stavanger) |
| 2006–07 | Eliteserien | | 44 | 16 | 24 | — | 0 | 4 | 148 | 194 | 52 | 7th | 6 | 2 | 4 | — | 22 | 30 | — | Lost in Quarter-finals, 2–4 (Storhamar) |
| 2007–08 | Eliteserien | | 44 | 7 | 30 | — | 4 | 3 | 94 | 174 | 32 | 9th | 6 | 5 | 1 | — | 41 | 14 | 16 | 1st in Qualifying for Eliteserien |
| 2008–09 | Eliteserien | | 45 | 24 | 15 | — | 2 | 4 | 166 | 143 | 65^{[g]} | 6th | 12 | 6 | 6 | — | 30 | 28 | — | Won in Quarter-finals, 4–2 (Lillehammer); Lost in Semi-finals, 2–4 (Sparta) |
| 2009–10 | Eliteserien | | 48 | 13 | 22 | — | 8 | 5 | 134 | 170 | 60 | 6th | 6 | 2 | 4 | — | 11 | 17 | — | Lost in Quarter-finals, 2–4 (Sparta) |
| Eliteserien totals^{[h]} | | | 1,226 | 607 | 491 | 66 | 31 | 31 | 5,240 | 4,607 | 1,497 | | 162 | 65 | 90 | 7 | 582 | 701 | 47 | 26 playoff appearances |

== Notes ==
- ^{a} Code explanation; GP—Games Played, W—Wins, L—Losses, T—Tied games, OTW—Overtime/Shootout wins, OTL—Overtime/Shootout losses, GF—Goals For, GA—Goals Against, Pts—Points
- ^{b} Before the 1963–64 season, the top division, Hovedserien was renamed 1. divisjon. Correspondingly, the 1. divisjon (second tier) was renamed 2. divisjon, the 2. divisjon (third tier) was renamed 3. divisjon etc.
- ^{c} Mellomspillet was a one-time continuation league contested in 1984–85 between the six highest ranked teams in the 1. divisjon. Of these six teams, the top four qualified for the semi-finals of the Norwegian Championship.
- ^{d} Before the 1990–91 season, the 1. divisjon was renamed Eliteserien. Correspondingly, the 2. divisjon (second tier) was renamed 1. divisjon, the 3. divisjon (third tier) was renamed 2. divisjon etc.
- ^{e} Between the 1990–91 season and the 1993–94 season, the Eliteserien was divided into two parts. After the first 18 games, the top eight teams qualified for the second half of the Eliteserien. The bottom two teams were relegated to the 1. divisjon and would compete for the right to play in the Eliteserien in the following season. In 1990–91, the results of both rounds were added up to produce one league champion; in the three following seasons, there were two champions per season.
- ^{f} Beginning with the 2002–03 season, all games in the Eliteserien have a winner. In addition, teams now receive three points for a win in regulation time, two points for a win in overtime and one point for a loss in overtime.
- ^{g} Stjernen were deducted fifteen points for violating the club license rules and regulations. According to the Norwegian Ice Hockey Association's ruling, Stjernen and two other clubs had failed to adequately report on the poor state of their finances when applying for their club licenses; they had not been forthcoming when asked repeatedly to provide documentation on said state; the documentation that was presented was insufficient; and finally, they had demonstrated a general lack of financial control.
- ^{h} Totals as of the completion of the 2009–10 season.
