= 1984–85 Norwegian 1. Divisjon season =

Norwegian ice hockey league season

The 1984–85 Norwegian 1. Divisjon season was the 46th season of ice hockey in Norway. Ten teams participated in the league, and Valerenga Ishockey won the championship.

== First round ==
	Club	GP	W	T	L	GF–GA	Pts
1.	Vålerenga Ishockey	18	13	1	4	116:58	27
2.	Storhamar Ishockey	18	13	1	4	134:77	27
3.	Sparta Sarpsborg	18	12	1	5	103:65	25
4.	Furuset IF	18	12	1	5	104:70	25
5.	Stjernen	18	11	0	7	96:65	22
6.	Manglerud Star Ishockey	18	9	1	8	104:90	19
7.	Frisk Asker	18	9	1	8	104:90	19
8.	Hasle-Løren Idrettslag	18	6	0	16	79:109	12
9.	Viking IK	18	2	0	16	47:106	4
10.	Strindheim IL	18	0	0	18	44:216	0

Source: Elite Prospects

== Second round ==
	Club	GP	W	T	L	GF–GA	Pts
1.	Storhamar Ishockey	10	8	0	2	58:48	16
2.	Vålerenga Ishockey	10	6	0	4	51:39	12
3.	Sparta Sarpsborg	10	5	1	4	51:42	11
4.	Furuset IF	10	4	1	5	56:49	9
5.	Manglerud Star Ishockey	10	4	0	6	44:61	8
6.	Stjernen	10	2	0	8	44:65	4

== Playoffs ==
Semi-finals
Vålerenga Ishockey	2
Sparta Sarpsborg	0
Storhamar Ishockey	1
Furuset IF	2

Final
Vålerenga Ishockey	3
Furuset IF	1
Third place
Not played

== Kvalserien ==
	Club	GP	W	T	L	GF–GA	Pts
1.	Frisk Asker	10	10	0	0	77:22	20
2.	Viking IK	10	7	1	2	49:28	15
3.	Hasle-Løren Idrettslag	10	6	1	3	45:41	13
4.	Forward Flyers	10	2	1	7	25:41	5
5.	SK Djerv	10	1	2	7	32:52	4
6.	Strindheim IL	10	1	1	8	35:80	3
