= Brian Tutt =

Canadian ice hockey player

- Born: June 9, 1962 (age 62); Swalwell, Alberta, Canada
- Height: 6 ft 3 in (191 cm)
- Weight: 230 lb (104 kg; 16 st 6 lb)
- Position: Defence
- Shot: Right
- Played for: Washington Capitals
- National team: Canada
- NHL draft: 126th overall, 1980; Philadelphia Flyers
- Playing career: 1982–2001

Brian Tutt
Medal record

Men's ice hockey

Representing Canada

Olympic Games
Silver medal – second place	1992 Albertville	Ice Hockey

World Championships
Bronze medal – third place	1995 Sweden	Ice hockey

Brian Carter Tutt (born June 9, 1962) is a Canadian former ice hockey player who played briefly for the Washington Capitals of the National Hockey League, playing seven games for the team during the 1989-90 NHL season, scoring one goal. He was originally drafted in 1980 by the Philadelphia Flyers, 126th overall.

Tutt was a member of the Canadian national team which won a silver medal in the 1992 Winter Olympics.

He is the father of the speed skater Brianne Tutt who represented Canada at the 2014 Winter Olympics in Sochi, Russia, and at the 2018 Winter Olympics in PyeongChang, South Korea.

== Career statistics ==
=== Regular season and playoffs ===
			Regular season					Playoffs
Season	Team	League	GP	G	A	Pts	PIM	GP	G	A	Pts	PIM
1979–80	Calgary Canucks	AJHL	59	6	14	20	55	—	—	—	—	—
1979–80	Calgary Wranglers	WHL	2	0	0	0	2	4	0	1	1	6
1980–81	Calgary Wranglers	WHL	72	10	41	51	111	22	3	11	14	30
1981–82	Calgary Wranglers	WHL	40	2	16	18	85	9	2	2	4	22
1982–83	Toledo Goaldiggers	IHL	42	7	13	20	56	11	1	7	8	16
1982–83	Maine Mariners	AHL	31	0	0	0	28	—	—	—	—	—
1983–84	Toledo Goaldiggers	IHL	82	7	44	51	79	13	0	6	6	16
1983–84	Springfield Indians	AHL	1	0	0	0	2	—	—	—	—	—
1984–85	Kalamazoo Wings	IHL	80	8	45	53	62	11	2	4	6	19
1984–85	Hershey Bears	AHL	3	0	0	0	8	—	—	—	—	—
1985–86	Kalamazoo Wings	IHL	82	11	39	50	129	6	1	6	7	11
1986–87	Kalamazoo Wings	IHL	19	2	7	9	10	—	—	—	—	—
1986–87	Maine Mariners	AHL	41	6	15	21	19	—	—	—	—	—
1986–87	Canada	Intl	15	0	3	3	18	—	—	—	—	—
1987–88	New Haven Nighthawks	AHL	32	1	12	13	33	—	—	—	—	—
1987–88	EHC Lustenau	AUT	24	5	12	17	36	—	—	—	—	—
1988–89	Baltimore Skipjacks	AHL	6	1	5	6	6	—	—	—	—	—
1988–89	Canada	Intl	63	0	19	19	87	—	—	—	—	—
1989–90	Washington Capitals	NHL	7	1	0	1	2	—	—	—	—	—
1989–90	Baltimore Skipjacks	AHL	67	2	13	15	80	9	1	0	1	14
1990–91	Furuset IF	NOR	30	10	21	31	88	6	5	4	9	—
1990–91	Canada	Intl	10	4	3	7	14	—	—	—	—	—
1991–92	Furuset IF	NOR	27	7	19	26	99	—	—	—	—	—
1991–92	Canada	Intl	9	1	2	3	6	—	—	—	—	—
1992–93	Ilves	Liiga	46	5	18	23	148	3	1	1	2	0
1993–94	Färjestad BK	SEL	21	1	3	4	32	—	—	—	—	—
1993–94	Färjestad BK	Allsv	13	2	2	4	20	3	0	0	0	8
1993–94	Canada	Intl	12	0	0	0	4	—	—	—	—	—
1994–95	Ilves	Liiga	25	1	3	4	42	—	—	—	—	—
1994–95	Canada	Intl	18	2	6	8	12	—	—	—	—	—
1995–96	SaPKo	FIN II	22	2	9	11	131	7	2	4	6	12
1996–97	SERC Wild Wings	DEL	31	4	14	18	71	—	—	—	—	—
1997–98	Hannover Scorpions	DEL	41	3	13	16	72	9	0	2	2	14
1998–99	Adler Mannheim	DEL	13	2	2	4	10	—	—	—	—	—
1998–99	Hannover Scorpions	DEL	35	1	9	10	84	—	—	—	—	—
1999–2000	Hannover Scorpions	DEL	45	1	6	7	82	—	—	—	—	—
2000–01	Huntsville Tornado	CHL	30	3	6	9	34	—	—	—	—	—
IHL totals			305	35	148	183	336	41	4	23	27	62
AHL totals			181	10	45	55	176	9	1	0	1	14
DEL totals			165	11	44	55	319	9	0	2	2	14

=== International ===
Year	Team	Event	GP	G	A	Pts	PIM
1992	Canada	OG	8	0	0	0	4
1992	Canada	WC	5	0	0	0	8
1995	Canada	WC	7	0	0	0	6
Senior totals			20	0	0	0	18
