= Per-Åge Skrøder =

Norwegian former ice hockey player (born 1978)

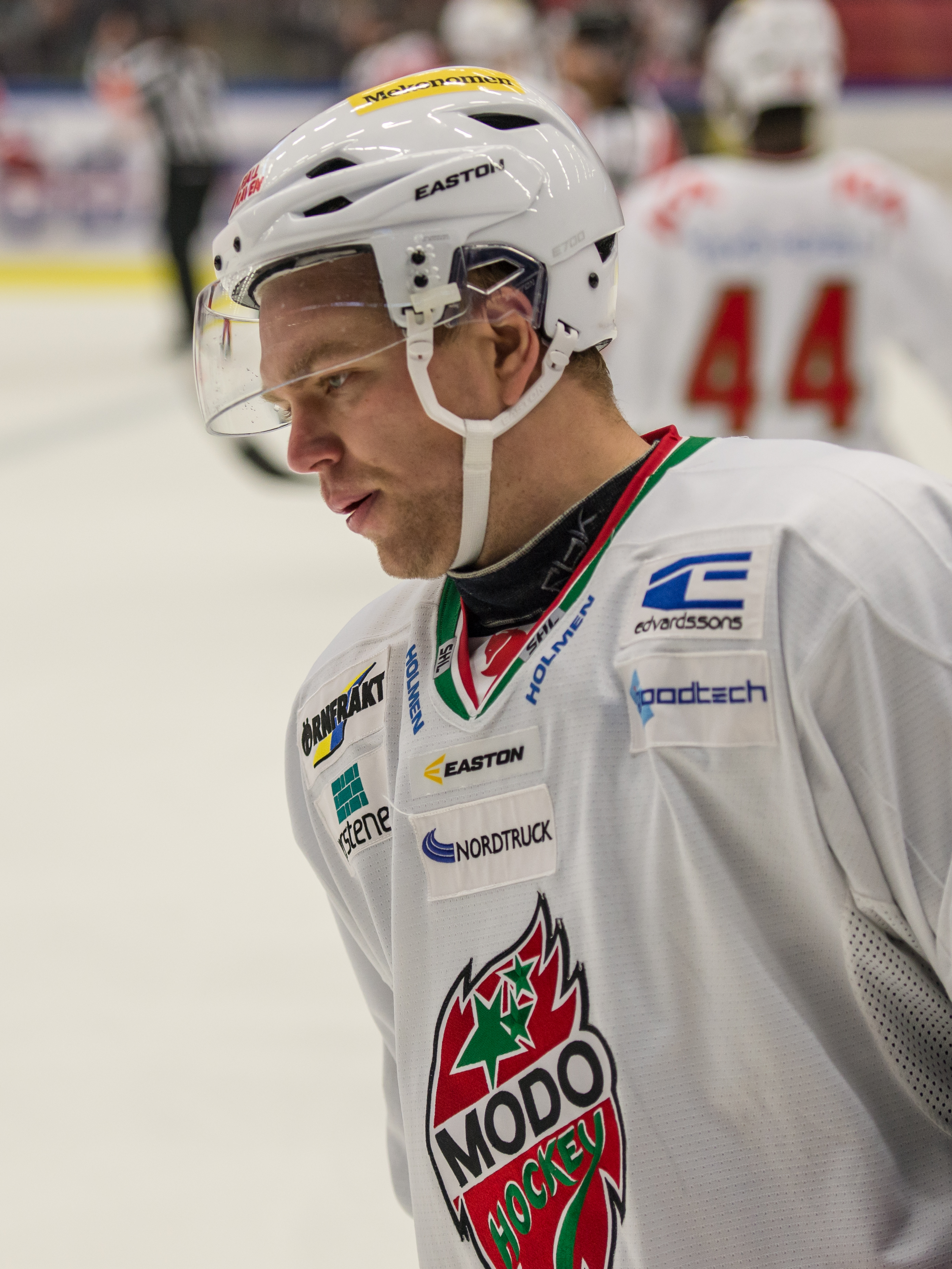
- Per-Åge Skrøder playing an away game for Modo against Örebro HK in the Swedish Hockey League in October 2013
- Born: August 4, 1978 (age 47) Sarpsborg, NOR
- Height: 5 ft 11 in (180 cm)
- Weight: 203 lb (92 kg; 14 st 7 lb)
- Position: Left wing
- Shot: Left
- Played for: Sparta Sarpsborg; Lillehammer IK; Frölunda HC; Linköpings HC; HV71; Södertälje SK; Modo Hockey
- National team: Norway
- Playing career: 1994–2017

Per-Åge Skrøder (born August 4, 1978) is a Norwegian former ice hockey player, who last played for Modo in the HockeyAllsvenskan (Allsv).

== Playing career ==
Previously, he played for the Norwegian teams Lillehammer and Sparta Warriors, and the Swedish teams Frölunda Indians, Linköping, HV 71 and Södertälje. In 2004 and 2007, he became Swedish champion. The first time with HV71 and the latter with Modo. In June 2017 Skrøder officially announced his retirement.

Skrøder played in the Norwegian national ice hockey team since 1999. In 2009 he scored his biggest personal achievement during his career, winning the points scorer rankings in the Swedish league, after playing with Niklas Sundström as center. The two formed an incredible partnership in the latter years of the decade with Modo.

== Awards and honours ==
- Norwegian Player of the Year in 2002.
- Elitserien Champion with HV71 in 2004.
- Elitserien Champion with Modo Hockey in 2007.

== Career statistics ==
=== Regular season and playoffs ===
			Regular season					Playoffs
Season	Team	League	GP	G	A	Pts	PIM	GP	G	A	Pts	PIM
1994–95	Sparta Warriors	NOR	17	3	0	3		—	—	—	—	—
1995–96	Lillehammer IK	NOR	30	4	5	9		—	—	—	—	—
1996–97	Lillehammer IK	NOR	35	25	29	54		—	—	—	—	—
1997–98	Sparta Warriors	NOR	36	19	15	34	70	—	—	—	—	—
1998–99	Västra Frölunda HC	J20	7	12	4	16	0	—	—	—	—	—
1998–99	Västra Frölunda HC	SEL	50	3	5	8	16	4	0	0	0	2
1999–2000	Västra Frölunda HC	SEL	24	3	1	4	8	—	—	—	—	—
1999–2000	Linköping HC	SEL	13	4	1	5	43	—	—	—	—	—
2000–01	HV71	SEL	13	5	6	11	6	—	—	—	—	—
2000–01	Linköping HC	SWE.2	29	7	10	17	38	4	0	1	1	4
2001–02	HV71	SEL	49	20	13	33	59	8	4	4	8	8
2002–03	HV71	SEL	44	12	10	22	50	7	3	0	3	10
2003–04	HV71	SEL	50	11	17	28	138	18	6	7	13	28
2004–05	HV71	SEL	50	6	8	14	77	—	—	—	—	—
2005–06	Södertälje SK	SEL	47	13	8	21	50	—	—	—	—	—
2006–07	Modo Hockey	SEL	54	30	18	48	97	20	5	5	10	88
2007–08	Modo Hockey	SEL	51	21	16	37	127	5	2	1	3	4
2008–09	Modo Hockey	SEL	55	30	29	59	78	—	—	—	—	—
2009–10	Modo Hockey	SEL	48	17	16	33	39	—	—	—	—	—
2010–11	Modo Hockey	SEL	55	15	26	41	62	—	—	—	—	—
2011–12	Modo Hockey	SEL	53	22	29	51	52	6	1	2	3	0
2012–13	Modo Hockey	SEL	51	16	19	35	34	5	2	3	5	2
2013–14	Modo Hockey	SHL	48	8	11	19	61	2	0	1	1	0
2014–15	Modo Hockey	SHL	51	14	11	25	49	—	—	—	—	—
2015–16	Modo Hockey	SHL	50	10	9	19	14	—	—	—	—	—
2016–17	Örnsköldsviks HF	SWE.3	11	8	7	15	4	—	—	—	—	—
2016–17	Sparta Warriors	NOR	4	0	1	1	6	—	—	—	—	—
2016–17	Modo Hockey	SWE.2	26	7	3	10	14	—	—	—	—	—
NOR totals			122	51	50	101		—	—	—	—	—
SEL/SHL totals			856	260	253	513	1060	75	23	23	46	142

=== International ===
Year	Team	Event	GP	G	A	Pts	PIM
1995	Norway	EJC	5	1	2	3	4
1996	Norway	EJC B	5	5	2	7	35
1997	Norway	WJC B	7	7	5	12	6
1997	Norway	WC	8	0	2	2	4
1998	Norway	WC B	7	1	2	3	22
1999	Norway	WC	6	2	1	3	4
1999	Norway	WC Q	3	1	0	1	6
2000	Norway	WC	6	4	1	5	0
2001	Norway	OGQ	3	2	1	3	4
2002	Norway	WC D1	5	4	1	5	14
2003	Norway	WC D1	5	4	1	5	4
2004	Norway	WC D1	4	2	0	2	2
2005	Norway	OGQ	6	9	3	12	8
2006	Norway	WC	6	2	0	2	6
2008	Norway	WC	7	0	1	1	2
2009	Norway	OGQ	3	0	3	3	0
2009	Norway	WC	6	0	2	2	4
2010	Norway	OG	1	0	0	0	0
2011	Norway	WC	7	3	4	7	10
2012	Norway	WC	8	5	7	12	2
2013	Norway	WC	7	2	1	3	2
2014	Norway	OG	4	2	0	2	0
2014	Norway	WC	7	1	2	3	6
Junior totals			17	13	9	22	45
Senior totals			109	44	32	76	100
