= 1987–88 Norwegian 1. Divisjon season =

Norwegian ice hockey league season

The 1987–88 Norwegian 1. Divisjon season was the 49th season of ice hockey in Norway. Ten teams participated in the league, and Valerenga Ishockey won the championship.

== Regular season ==
	Club	GP	W	T	L	GF–GA	Pts
1.	Vålerenga Ishockey	36	30	1	5	223:122	61
2.	Storhamar Ishockey	36	23	2	11	177:124	48
3.	Furuset IF	36	23	0	13	200:129	46
4.	Frisk Asker	36	20	2	14	174:134	42
5.	Trondheim	36	20	1	15	156:122	41
6.	Sparta Sarpsborg	36	18	0	18	177:181	36
7.	Stjernen	36	14	2	20	165:189	30
8.	Viking IK	36	13	1	22	149:199	27
9.	Manglerud Star Ishockey	36	11	2	23	137:184	24
10.	Bergen/Djerv	36	2	1	33	105:279	5

Source: Elite Prospects

== Playoffs ==
Semi-finals
Vålerenga Ishockey	2
Frisk Asker	0
Storhamar Ishockey	0
Furuset IF	2

Final
Vålerenga Ishockey	3
Furuset IF	2
Third place
Not played
