= Viking Stavanger =

Viking Stavanger may refer to:

- IL Viking, a defunct multi-sports club from Stavanger and its former departments:
  - Viking FK, an association football club from Stavanger
  - Viking HK, a team handball club from Stavanger
  - Viking IK, a defunct ice hockey club from Stavanger
