= Jiří Látal =

Czech ice hockey player

- Born: February 2, 1967 (age 58); Olomouc, Czechoslovakia
- Height: 6 ft 0 in (183 cm)
- Weight: 190 lb (86 kg; 13 st 8 lb)
- Position: Defense
- Shot: Left
- Played for: TJ Sparta ČKD Praha; ASVŠ Dukla Trenčín; Philadelphia Flyers; Vålerenga Ishockey; Reipas Lahti; HC Olomouc; HC Dadák Vsetín
- National team: Czechoslovakia
- NHL draft: 106th overall, 1985; Toronto Maple Leafs
- Playing career: 1984–1996

Jiří Látal (born February 2, 1967) is a Czech former professional ice hockey player. He played 92 games in the National Hockey League with the Philadelphia Flyers from 1989 to 1991. The rest of his career, which lasted from 1984 to 1996, was mainly spent in the Czechoslovak First Ice Hockey League and then Czech Extraliga. Internationally he played for the Czechoslovak national team at three World Junior Championships and at the 1989 World Championships, winning a bronze at the latter. In December 2009, he served as the General Manager of the Czech Republic team competing in the World Junior Hockey Championships in Regina, Saskatchewan.

== Career statistics ==
=== Regular season and playoffs ===
| | | | Regular season | | | | | Playoffs |
| Season | Team | League | GP | G | A | Pts | PIM | GP | G | A | Pts | PIM |
|---|---|---|---|---|---|---|---|---|---|---|---|---|
| 1983–84 | TJ DS Olomouc | CSSR U20 | 34 | 12 | 14 | 26 | — | — | — | — | — | — |
| 1984–85 | TJ Sparta ČKD Praha | CSSR | 26 | 2 | 2 | 4 | 10 | — | — | — | — | — |
| 1985–86 | TJ Sparta ČKD Praha | CSSR | 27 | 3 | 2 | 5 | 8 | — | — | — | — | — |
| 1986–87 | TJ Sparta ČKD Praha | CSSR | 9 | 1 | 0 | 1 | 2 | — | — | — | — | — |
| 1987–88 | ASVŠ Dukla Trenčín | CSSR | 46 | 8 | 12 | 20 | 27 | — | — | — | — | — |
| 1988–89 | ASVŠ Dukla Trenčín | CSSR | 34 | 6 | 20 | 26 | 34 | 11 | 0 | 2 | 2 | — |
| 1989–90 | Philadelphia Flyers | NHL | 32 | 6 | 13 | 19 | 6 | — | — | — | — | — |
| 1989–90 | Hershey Bears | AHL | 22 | 10 | 18 | 28 | 10 | — | — | — | — | — |
| 1990–91 | Philadelphia Flyers | NHL | 50 | 5 | 21 | 26 | 14 | — | — | — | — | — |
| 1991–92 | Philadelphia Flyers | NHL | 10 | 1 | 2 | 3 | 4 | — | — | — | — | — |
| 1991–92 | Vålerenga Ishockey | NOR | 32 | 7 | 16 | 23 | 18 | — | — | — | — | — |
| 1992–93 | Reipas Lahti | SM-l | 41 | 5 | 20 | 25 | 18 | — | — | — | — | — |
| 1993–94 | Vålerenga Ishockey | NOR | — | — | — | — | — | — | — | — | — | — |
| 1994–95 | HC Olomouc | CZE | 2 | 0 | 0 | 0 | 0 | — | — | — | — | — |
| 1995–96 | HC Dadák Vsetín | CZE | 2 | 0 | 1 | 1 | 0 | — | — | — | — | — |
| 1995–96 | HC Olomouc | CZE | 27 | 5 | 8 | 13 | 18 | 4 | 2 | 2 | 4 | 0 |
| CSSR totals | | | 142 | 20 | 36 | 56 | 81 | 11 | 0 | 2 | 2 | — |
| NHL totals | | | 92 | 12 | 36 | 48 | 24 | — | — | — | — | — |

=== International ===
| Year | Team | Event | GP | G | A | Pts | PIM |
|---|---|---|---|---|---|---|---|
| 1984 | Czechoslovakia | EJC | 5 | 0 | 0 | 0 | 6 |
| 1985 | Czechoslovakia | WJC | 7 | 0 | 4 | 4 | 2 |
| 1986 | Czechoslovakia | WJC | 7 | 0 | 2 | 2 | 2 |
| 1987 | Czechoslovakia | WJC | 7 | 4 | 2 | 6 | 0 |
| 1989 | Czechoslovakia | WC | 1 | 0 | 0 | 0 | 0 |
| Junior totals | | | 26 | 4 | 8 | 12 | 10 |
| Senior totals | | | 1 | 0 | 0 | 0 | 0 |
