= 1988–89 Norwegian 1. Divisjon season =

Norwegian ice hockey league season

The 1988–89 Norwegian 1. Divisjon season was the 50th season of ice hockey in Norway. Ten teams participated in the league, and Sparta Sarpsborg won the championship.

== Regular season ==
	Club	GP	W	T	L	GF–GA	Pts
1.	Trondheim	36	28	1	7	198:121	57
2.	Storhamar Ishockey	36	22	1	13	180:153	45
3.	Stjernen	36	21	2	13	181:183	44
4.	Sparta Sarpsborg	36	21	2	13	159:135	44
5.	Vålerenga Ishockey	36	18	3	15	164:160	39
6.	Frisk Asker	36	15	3	18	165:171	33
7.	Viking IK	36	14	2	20	142:168	30
8.	Furuset IF	36	13	2	21	158:161	28
9.	Manglerud Star Ishockey	36	11	5	20	157:182	27
10.	Hasle-Løren Idrettslag	36	6	1	29	120:220	13

Source: Elite Prospects

== Playoffs ==
Semi-finals
Trondheim	2
Stjernen	1
Storhamar Ishockey	0
Sparta Sarpsborg	2

Final
Trondheim	1
Sparta Sarpsborg	3
Third place
Not played
