= Steve Allman =

Norwegian ice hockey player

- Born: May 16, 1968 (age 57) Oslo, Norway
- Height: 6 ft 0 in (183 cm)
- Weight: 183 lb (83 kg; 13 st 1 lb)
- Position: Goalie
- Caught: Left
- Played for: Furuset Ishockey; Trondheim Black Panthers; Manglerud Star Ishockey
- National team: Norway
- Playing career: 1986–1998

Steve Allman (born 16 May 1968) is a Norwegian former professional ice hockey goaltender.

Allman was born in Oslo, Norway. He played in the Eliteserien for Furuset, Trondheim Black Panthers, and Manglerud Star. He played for the Norwegian national ice hockey team at the 1992 Winter Olympics.
