= Christian Anker-Larsen =

Norwegian journalist and distance runner

Christian Anker-Larsen (27 August 1905 – 16 October 1971) was a Norwegian athlete and newspaper editor.

== Early life ==
He was born at Storhaug in Hetland Municipality as a son of a printer.

== Education ==
Anker-Larsen finished his secondary education at Stavanger Cathedral school in 1924.

== Career ==
After graduating from Stord Teachers' College in 1927, he worked as a teacher in Øvre Sandsvær for one year, before being hired as a sports journalist in Dagbladet Rogaland in 1928. At that time he was an able footballer and middle distance runner. He won the bronze medal in the 800 metres at the Norwegian championships in 1927, behind Olaf Strand and Hjalmar Johannessen. He won a national silver medal in the 1500 metres in 1928 behind Reidar Jørgensen, and later became Norwegian champion in 1931 with a new meet record of 4:03.1 minutes. He represented the club IL Viking. He also played football for FK Vidar.

During the occupation of Norway by Nazi Germany he was arrested in Stavanger on 21 February 1945 and imprisoned in Grini concentration camp from 11 March to the war's end on 8 May 1945. He was sub-editor in Dagbladet Rogaland from 1946, and was later news editor and acting editor-in-chief. He was hired in Stavanger Aftenblad in 1950, and became editor of agricultural affairs and personalia. He was also a prolific writer of local history books. He died in 1971.
