= 1989–90 Norwegian 1. Divisjon season =

Norwegian ice hockey league season

The 1989–90 Norwegian 1. Divisjon season was the 51st season of ice hockey in Norway. Ten teams participated in the league, and Furuset IF won the championship.

== Regular season ==
	Club	GP	W	T	L	GF–GA	Pts
1.	Furuset	36	24	5	7	237:117	53
2.	Vålerenga	36	24	3	9	232:137	51
3.	Sparta	36	25	0	11	197:144	50
4.	Stjernen	36	23	3	10	218:148	49
5.	Storhamar	36	23	3	10	200:131	49
6.	Trondheim	36	15	4	17	166:145	34
7.	Frisk Asker	36	12	3	21	156:210	27
8.	Manglerud Star	36	11	3	22	152:172	25
9.	Viking	36	8	4	24	146:201	20
10.	Bergen/Djerv	36	1	0	35	64:363	2

Source: Elite Prospects

== Playoffs ==
Semi-finals
Furuset	2
Stjernen	1
Vålerenga	2
Sparta	1

Final
Furuset	3
Vålerenga	0
Third place
Not played
