= 1992–93 Eliteserien season =

Norwegian ice hockey season

The 1992–93 Eliteserien season was the 54th season of ice hockey in Norway. Ten teams participated in the league, and Vålerenga Ishockey won the championship.

== Grunnserien ==
	Club	GP	W	T	L	GF–GA	Pts
1.	Vålerenga Ishockey	18	14	2	2	100:41	30
2.	Stjernen	18	14	2	2	93:56	30
3.	Storhamar Ishockey	18	14	0	4	120:48	28
4.	Lillehammer IK	18	10	5	3	89:60	25
5.	Furuset IF	18	10	0	8	65:55	20
6.	Viking IK	18	7	3	8	82:65	17
7.	Sparta Sarpsborg	18	5	0	13	82:97	10
8.	Frisk Asker	18	4	1	13	60:94	9
9.	Trondheim IK	18	4	1	13	70:110	9
10.	Hasle-Løren Idrettslag	18	1	0	17	26:161	2

== Eliteserien ==
	Club	GP	W	T	L	GF–GA	Pts (Bonus)
1.	Storhamar Ishockey	14	10	0	4	78:30	22(2)
2.	Vålerenga Ishockey	14	7	2	5	47:41	20(4)
3.	Stjernen	14	8	1	5	67:54	20(3)
4.	Furuset IF	14	8	2	4	49:36	18(0)
5.	Lillehammer IK	14	8	0	6	63:52	17(1)
6.	Viking IK	14	7	0	7	51:52	14(0)
7.	Sparta Sarpsborg	14	5	1	8	52:63	11(0)
8.	Frisk Asker	14	0	0	14	32:111	0(0)

== Playoff Qualification ==
=== Group A ===
	Club	GP	W	T	L	GF–GA	Pts
1.	Furuset IF	2	2	0	0	5:2	4
2.	Storhamar Ishockey	2	1	0	1	5:5	2
3.	Lillehammer IK	2	0	0	2	4:7	0

=== Group B ===
	Club	GP	W	T	L	GF–GA	Pts
1.	Vålerenga Ishockey	2	2	0	0	10:5	4
2.	Viking IK	2	1	0	1	9:8	2
3.	Stjernen	2	0	0	2	5:11	0

== Playoffs ==
Semi-finals
Vålerenga Ishockey	2
Storhamar Ishockey	1
Furuset IF	2
Viking IK	1

Final
Vålerenga Ishockey	3
Furuset IF	1
Third place
not played
