= 1980–81 Division 1 season (Swedish ice hockey) =

- League: Division 1
- Sport: Ice hockey
- Number of teams: 40
- Promoted to Division 1: Timrå IK to Elitserien
- Relegated to Division 2: Järveds IF; Falu IF; Vallentuna BK; Tranås AIF

Division 1 seasons
- ← 1979–80 1981–82 →

1980-81 was the sixth season that Division 1 operated as the second tier of ice hockey in Sweden, below the top-flight Elitserien (now the SHL).

Division 1 was divided into four starting groups, based on geography. The top four teams in the group would continue to the playoffs to determine which clubs would participate in the qualifier for promotion to Elitserien. The bottom team in each group was relegated directly to Division 2 for the 1981–82 season. The second-to-last place team in each group played in a relegation series to determine their participation in the next season.

== Regular season ==
=== Northern Group ===
	Club	GP	W	T	L	GF	GA	Pts
1.	Timrå IK	27	23	2	2	195	69	48
2.	Luleå HF	27	21	4	2	184	85	46
3.	Kiruna AIF	27	17	3	7	218	114	37
4.	Bodens BK	27	13	6	8	140	123	32
5.	IFK Kiruna	27	10	7	10	118	128	27
6.	Piteå IF	27	10	2	15	137	151	22
7.	Kågedalens AIF	27	7	3	17	117	168	17
8.	Kalix/Triangelns IF	27	6	4	17	82	154	16
9.	Nordingrå SK	27	5	4	18	71	171	14
10.	Järveds IF	27	3	5	19	99	198	11

=== Western Group ===
	Club	GP	W	T	L	GF	GA	Pts
1.	Mora IK	27	22	2	3	193	91	46
2.	Västerås IK	27	21	3	3	183	71	45
3.	Strömsbro IF	27	14	4	9	147	123	32
4.	Malungs IF	27	12	1	14	99	110	25
5.	Borlänge HC	27	7	10	10	95	105	24
6.	IK Westmannia	27	8	6	13	98	146	24
7.	IK Rommehed	27	9	3	15	107	142	21
8.	Avesta BK	27	9	1	17	105	137	19
9.	Hofors IK	27	8	3	16	99	165	19
10.	Falu IF	27	7	3	17	109	145	17

=== Eastern Group ===
	Club	GP	W	T	L	GF	GA	Pts
1.	Hammarby IF	36	26	5	5	172	82	57
2.	Örebro IK	36	25	4	7	236	157	54
3.	Almtuna IS	36	19	8	9	210	128	46
4.	Bofors IK	36	19	2	15	170	142	40
5.	Nacka HK	36	19	2	15	164	141	40
6.	Väsby IK	36	15	2	19	146	170	32
7.	Huddinge IK	36	13	5	18	154	146	31
8.	Skövde IK	36	12	4	20	148	209	28
9.	IK Vita Hästen	36	8	2	26	133	212	18
10.	Vallentuna BK	36	6	2	28	93	239	14

=== Southern Group ===
	Club	GP	W	T	L	GF	GA	Pts
1.	HV71	36	31	1	4	260	95	63
2.	Tingsryds AIF	36	22	2	12	166	139	46
3.	IF Troja	36	21	3	12	177	135	45
4.	IFK Bäcken	36	18	4	14	188	150	40
5.	Mörrums GoIS	36	18	1	17	152	157	37
6.	Karlskrona IK	36	14	4	18	146	153	32
7.	Nybro IF	36	13	6	17	148	167	32
8.	Malmö IF	36	13	4	19	139	175	30
9.	Gislaveds SK	36	12	2	22	136	189	26
10.	Tranås AIF	36	3	3	30	132	284	9

== Playoffs ==
=== First round ===
- Kiruna AIF - Malungs IF 2:0 (5:2, 5:2)
- Bodens BK - Strömsbro IF 1:2 (8:7, 4:7, 1:10)
- Almtuna IS - IFK Bäcken 0:2 (4:5, 3:6)
- IF Troja - Bofors IK 2:0 (9:3, 6:4)

=== Second round ===
- Timrå IK - Strömsbro IF 2:1 (12:1, 3:4 OT, 12:3)
- IF Troja - Hammarby IF 1:2 (2:6, 2:0, 4:10)
- Mora IK - Kiruna AIF 2:1 (6:2, 2:11, 8:3)
- HV71 - IFK Bäcken 2:1 (5:2, 5:6 OT, 8:3)
- Luleå HF - Västerås IK 2:1 (10:4, 3:6, 6:5)
- Örebro IK - Tingsryds AIF 2:0 (5:3, 10:2)

=== Third round ===
- Örebro IK - Timrå IK 0:2 (5:6, 4:8)
- Luleå HF - HV71 1:2 (3:2, 3:11, 3:5)
- Hammarby IF - Mora IK 2:0 (3:1, 5:2)
