= IL Viking =

Norwegian sports club

- Full name: Idrettslaget Viking
- Founded: 10 August 1899
- Ground: Stavanger stadion, Eiganes, Stavanger

Idrettslaget Viking was a Norwegian multi-sports club from Stavanger, Rogaland.

It was founded on 10 August 1899, and the club members volunteered to establish a sports field in Vikingmarkå, later the site of Stavanger stadion. The Norwegian championships in track and field were held already in 1901. In addition to track, the other main sport was association football. For shorter of longer periods the club also offered rugby, cricket, baseball, gymnastics, boxing, amateur wrestling, swimming, rowing, skiing, speed skating, equestrianism and harness racing.

The club saw its athletics heyday before 1930, with Jonas Solheim, August Pettersen and Bjarne Stangeland as prominent athletes; in 1931 Christian Anker-Larsen became 1500 metres champion. Liv Paulsen was among the national pioneers in women's athletics. The football team pioneered the sport in Stavanger, and became nationally prominent from 1925, when they reached the semi-final in the Norwegian football cup. The best player was Reidar Kvammen, and other international players during its first fifty years were Torgeir Torgersen, William Danielsen, Bernhard Lund, Inge Paulsen, Arthur Kvammen, Sverre Kvammen and Karsten Johannessen. A chairman for the football section was Einar Diesen. The club was also successful in amateur boxing.

In 1987 the multi-sports club was discontinued as it was split into three; the football club Viking FK, the ice hockey club Viking IK, the handball club Viking HK and an athlete's club which included boxing. Professional boxer Ole Klemetsen represented the club.
