= 1981–82 Division 1 season (Swedish ice hockey) =

- League: Division 1
- Sport: Ice hockey
- Teams: 40
- Promoted to Division 1: Hammarby IF to Elitserien
- Relegated to Division 2: Kalix/Triangelns IF; Ludvika HC; Avesta BK; Hanhals BK

Division 1 seasons
- 1980–81 1982–83

1981–82 was the seventh season that Division 1 operated as the second tier of ice hockey in Sweden, below the top-flight Elitserien (now the SHL).

Division 1 was divided into four starting groups, based on geography. The top four teams in the group would continue to the playoffs to determine which clubs would participate in the qualifier for promotion to Elitserien. The bottom team in each group was relegated directly to Division 2 for the 1982–83 season. The second-to-last place team in each group played in a relegation series to determine their participation in the next season.

== Regular season ==
=== Northern Group ===
	Club	GP	W	T	L	GF	GA	Pts
1.	Luleå HF	27	21	1	5	181	92	43
2.	Piteå IF	27	18	3	6	154	123	39
3.	Kiruna AIF	27	13	4	10	154	110	30
4.	IFK Kiruna	27	14	2	11	163	128	30
5.	Sundsvall/Tunadal	27	13	3	11	161	147	29
6.	Tegs SK	27	13	2	12	137	137	28
7.	CRIF/Kågedalens AIF	27	11	4	12	128	117	26
8.	Bodens BK	27	12	1	14	157	166	25
9.	Kramfors-Alliansen	27	9	2	16	129	159	20
10.	Kalix/Triangelns IF	27	0	0	27	73	258	0

=== Western Group ===
	Club	GP	W	T	L	GF	GA	Pts
1.	Örebro IK	36	27	2	7	258	143	56
2.	Mora IK	36	25	3	8	220	127	53
3.	Västerås IK	36	25	0	11	196	125	50
4.	Bofors IK	36	21	2	13	176	140	44
5.	Skövde IK	36	21	2	13	182	152	44
6.	Malungs IF	36	13	4	19	136	172	30
7.	HC Dobel	36	12	3	21	141	192	27
8.	Fagersta AIK	36	9	6	21	139	202	24
9.	IK Westmannia	36	8	3	25	127	192	19
10.	Ludvika HC	36	3	7	26	115	245	13

=== Eastern Group ===
	Club	GP	W	T	L	GF	GA	Pts
1.	Södertälje SK	36	29	3	4	257	114	61
2.	Hammarby IF	36	22	7	7	197	114	51
3.	Huddinge IK	36	21	3	12	202	157	45
4.	Nacka HK	36	18	4	14	166	144	40
5.	Strömsbro IF	36	15	7	14	166	161	37
6.	IK Vita Hästen	36	15	4	17	177	167	34
7.	Väsby IK	36	15	4	17	168	184	34
8.	Almtuna IS	36	12	3	21	144	176	27
9.	Gävle GIK	36	10	3	23	143	225	23
10.	Avesta BK	36	4	0	32	123	306	8

=== Southern Group ===
	Club	GP	W	T	L	GF	GA	Pts
1.	HV71	36	32	2	2	266	126	66
2.	IF Troja	36	23	6	7	221	133	52
3.	Tingsryds AIF	36	20	3	13	154	148	43
4.	Mörrums GoIS	36	17	4	15	177	171	38
5.	Nybro IF	36	16	2	18	166	172	34
6.	IFK Bäcken	36	15	3	18	163	169	33
7.	Karlskrona IK	36	13	4	19	167	175	30
8.	Malmö IF	36	12	3	21	153	205	27
9.	Osby IK	36	9	3	24	151	216	21
10.	Hanhals BK	36	6	4	26	137	240	16

== Playoffs ==
=== First round ===
- Kiruna AIF - Nacka HK 0:2 (3:5, 2:3)
- Huddinge IK - IFK Kiruna 2:0 (12:3, 4:3 OT)
- Västerås IK - Mörrums GoIS 2:0 (6:3, 4:1)
- Tingsryds AIF - Bofors IK 1:2 (7:3, 2:5, 3:6)

=== Second round ===
- Luleå HF - Huddinge IK 2:1 (6:5, 2:4, 4:2)
- Södertälje SK - Nacka HK 2:0 (6:2, 3:2)
- Örebro IK - Bofors IK 0:2 (4:7, 3:4)
- HV71 - Västerås IK 2:0 (3:1, 8:3)
- Piteå IF - Hammarby IF 0:2 (2:14, 1:4)
- Mora IK - IF Troja 2:0 (6:4, 5:4)

=== Third round ===
- Luleå HF - HV71 0:2 (6:7, 4:8)
- Södertälje SK - Mora IK 2:0 (8:1, 9:1)
- Bofors IK - Hammarby IF 0:2 (2:4, 1:6)
