= Morten Finstad =

Norwegian ice hockey player

- Born: May 24, 1967 (age 58) Fredrikstad, Norway
- Height: 5 ft 11 in (180 cm)
- Weight: 187 lb (85 kg; 13 st 5 lb)
- Position: Centre
- Played for: Stjernen Hockey
- National team: Norway
- Playing career: 1986–2001

Morten Finstad (born May 24, 1967) is a Norwegian former ice hockey player.

Finstad spent his entire career playing for Stjernen Hockey between 1986 and 2001. He played for the Norwegian national ice hockey team, and participated at the Winter Olympics in 1994. He was awarded Gullpucken as best Norwegian ice hockey player in 1998.
