= 1996–97 Eliteserien season =

Norwegian ice hockey season

The 1996–97 Eliteserien season was the 58th season of ice hockey in Norway. Ten teams participated in the league, and Storhamar Ishockey won the championship.

== Regular season ==
	Club	GP	W	T	L	GF–GA	Pts
1.	Storhamar Ishockey	36	33	2	1	222:58	68
2.	Vålerenga Ishockey	36	27	0	9	215:99	54
3.	Trondheim IK	36	22	2	12	143:107	46
4.	Frisk Asker	36	21	1	14	170:123	43
5.	Stjernen	36	20	2	14	153:133	42
6.	Lillehammer IK	36	17	3	16	159:160	37
7.	Manglerud Star Ishockey	36	13	2	21	127:179	28
8.	Lørenskog IK	36	8	1	27	115:216	17
9.	Furuset IF	36	6	3	27	96:211	15
10.	Hasle-Løren Idrettslag	36	5	0	31	88:232	10

Source: Elite Prospects

== Playoffs ==
Quarter-finals
Storhamar Ishockey	3
Lørenskog IK	0
Trondheim IK	1
Stjernen	3
Vålerenga Ishockey	3
Manglerud Star Ishockey	2
Frisk Asker	3
Lillehammer IK	0

Semi-finals
Storhamar Ishockey	3
Stjernen	0
Vålerenga Ishockey	3
Frisk Asker	0

Final
Storhamar Ishockey	3
Vålerenga Ishockey	1

== Relegation ==
- Furuset IF - Viking IK 2:1 (4:1, 5:7, 10:4)
