= 1991–92 Eliteserien season =

Norwegian ice hockey season

The 1991–92 Eliteserien season was the 53rd season of ice hockey in Norway. Ten teams participated in the league, and Valerenga Ishockey won the championship.

== Grunnserien ==
	Club	GP	W	T	L	GF–GA	Pts
1.	Vålerenga Ishockey	18	15	1	2	101:36	31
2.	Storhamar Ishockey	18	11	1	6	101:57	23
3.	Trondheim IK	18	10	2	6	83:71	22
4.	Furuset IF	18	11	0	7	63:60	22
5.	Viking IK	18	10	1	7	85:82	21
6.	Stjernen	18	8	1	9	74:57	17
7.	Sparta Sarpsborg	18	8	0	10	87:77	16
8.	Lillehammer IK	18	7	2	9	73:89	16
9.	Frisk Asker	18	5	0	13	63:107	10
10.	Hasle-Løren Idrettslag	18	0	2	16	41:135	2

Source: Elite Prospects

== Eliteserien ==
	Club	GP	W	T	L	GF–GA	Pts
1.	Trondheim IK	14	10	1	3	68:49	21
2.	Stjernen	14	8	2	4	73:55	18
3.	Vålerenga Ishockey	14	8	1	5	63:49	17
4.	Storhamar Ishockey	14	7	0	7	68:56	14
5.	Viking IK	14	7	0	7	45:62	14
6.	Sparta Sarpsborg	14	5	1	8	59:62	11
7.	Furuset IF	14	4	1	9	50:61	9
8.	Lillehammer IK	14	3	2	9	42:74	8

== Playoff Qualification ==
=== Group A ===
	Club	GP	W	T	L	GF–GA	Pts
1.	Vålerenga Ishockey	2	2	0	0	11:6	4
2.	Stjernen	2	1	0	1	7:10	2
3.	Sparta Sarpsborg	2	0	0	2	6:8	0

=== Group B ===
	Club	GP	W	T	L	GF–GA	Pts
1.	Trondheim IK	2	2	0	0	8:3	4
2.	Storhamar Ishockey	2	1	0	1	12:10	2
3.	Viking IK	2	0	0	2	5:12	0

== Playoffs ==
Semi-finals
Vålerenga Ishockey	2
Storhamar Ishockey	1
Trondheim IK	0
Stjernen	2

Final
Vålerenga Ishockey	3
Stjernen	0
Third place
not played
