= 1994–95 Eliteserien season =

- League: Eliteserien
- Sport: Ice hockey
- Number of teams: 8
- Regular-season winner: Storhamar
- Champions: Storhamar

Eliteserien seasons
- ← 1993–94 season 1995–96 season →

The 1994–95 Eliteserien season ended with Storhamar claiming their first Norwegian title after defeating Stjernen 3–0 in the finals.

== Regular season ==
=== Final standings ===
#	Eliteserien	GP	W	T	L	GF	GA	PTS
1	Storhamar (C)	28	21	5	2	192	57	47
2	Vålerenga	28	18	4	6	154	91	40
3	Lillehammer	28	17	4	7	117	97	38
4	Spektrum Flyers	28	15	3	10	118	84	33
5	Stjernen	28	13	3	12	134	124	29
6	Viking	28	7	2	19	88	128	16
7	Trondheim	28	7	1	20	78	138	16
8	Sparta	28	2	2	24	70	217	6

GP = Games played; W = Wins; T = Ties; L = Losses; GF = Goals for; GA = Goals against; PTS = Points
Source: hockey.no

== Playoffs ==
=== Quarter-finals ===
Seed	Pool A	GP	W	T	L	GF	GA	PTS
5	Stjernen	4	3	0	1	19	16	6
1	Storhamar	4	3	0	1	12	11	6
4	Spektrum Flyers	4	0	0	4	14	18	0

GP = Games played; W = Wins; T = Ties; L = Losses; GF = Goals for; GA = Goals against; PTS = Points
Source: hockey.no

Seed	Pool B	GP	W	T	L	GF	GA	PTS
2	Vålerenga	4	3	0	1	18	12	6
3	Lillehammer	4	2	0	2	14	13	4
6	Viking	4	1	0	3	15	22	2

GP = Games played; W = Wins; T = Ties; L = Losses; GF = Goals for; GA = Goals against; PTS = Points
Source: hockey.no

=== Semi-finals and Finals ===
Semi-finals
1	Storhamar Dragons	2
2	Vålerenga	0
5	Stjernen	2
3	Lillehammer	0

Finals
1	Storhamar Dragons	3
5	Stjernen	0

Source: hockey.no

Norwegian Champions
1995
Storhamar Dragons
1st title

== Promotion/Relegation ==
=== First Division qualification ===
Seed	Pool A	GP	W	T	L	GF	GA	PTS
1	Lørenskog	2	1	1	0	9	4	3
4	Stavanger	2	1	0	1	8	10	2
5	Furuset	2	0	1	1	5	8	1

GP = Games played; W = Wins; T = Ties; L = Losses; GF = Goals for; GA = Goals against; PTS = Points
Source: hockey.no

Seed	Pool B	GP	W	T	L	GF	GA	PTS
3	Frisk Asker	2	2	0	0	17	2	4
2	Bergen	2	1	0	1	9	10	2
6	Hasle-Løren	2	0	0	2	4	18	0

GP = Games played; W = Wins; T = Ties; L = Losses; GF = Goals for; GA = Goals against; PTS = Points
Source: hockey.no

=== Final round ===
#	Eliteserien	GP	W	T	L	GF	GA	PTS
1	Trondheim (P)	6	6	0	0	31	12	12
2	Sparta (P)	6	3	0	3	23	16	6
3	Lørenskog	6	2	1	3	13	26	5
4	Frisk Asker	6	0	1	5	16	29	1

GP = Games played; W = Wins; T = Ties; L = Losses; GF = Goals for; GA = Goals against; PTS = Points
Source: hockey.no
