= 1990–91 Eliteserien season =

Norwegian ice hockey season

The 1990–91 Eliteserien season was the 52nd season of ice hockey in Norway. Eight teams participated in the league, and Valerenga Ishockey won the championship.

== Partecipants ==
- Furuset IF
- Hasle-Løren Idrettslag
- Sparta Sarpsborg
- Storhamar Ishockey
- Trondheim IK
- Viking IK
- Vålerenga Ishockey

== Regular season ==
	Club	GP	W	T	L	GF–GA	Pts
1.	Vålerenga Ishockey	32	24	3	5	177:84	51
2.	Furuset IF	32	21	4	7	152:113	46
3.	Stjernen	32	20	4	8	151:106	44
4.	Sparta Sarpsborg	32	19	2	11	206:133	40
5.	Trondheim IK	32	17	3	12	155:109	37
6.	Storhamar Ishockey	32	12	1	19	129:140	25
7.	Viking IK	32	11	2	19	143:144	24
8.	Hasle-Løren Idrettslag	32	7	1	24	98:190	15

== Playoffs ==
Semi-finals
Vålerenga Ishockey	2
Sparta Sarpsborg	0
Furuset IF	2
Stjernen	1

Final
Vålerenga Ishockey	3
Furuset IF	0
Third place
Not played
