= 1993–94 Eliteserien season =

Norwegian ice hockey season

The 1993–94 GET-ligaen season was the 55th season of ice hockey in Norway. Ten teams participated in the league, and Lillehammer IK won the championship.

== Grunnserien ==
	Club	GP	W	T	L	GF–GA	Pts
1.	Storhamar Ishockey	18	14	1	3	125:51	29
2.	Lillehammer IK	18	12	4	2	67:38	28
3.	Vålerenga Ishockey	18	10	3	5	76:54	23
4.	Stjernen	18	10	2	6	75:67	22
5.	Trondheim IK	18	9	2	7	87:79	20
6.	Sparta Sarpsborg	18	8	2	8	86:72	18
7.	Viking IK	18	5	5	8	65:68	15
8.	Manglerud Star Ishockey	18	5	4	9	63:85	14
9.	Furuset IF	18	3	0	15	51:120	6
10.	Frisk Asker	18	2	1	15	63:85	5

Source: Elite Prospects

== Eliteserien ==
	Club	GP	W	T	L	GF–GA	Pts (Bonus)
1.	Vålerenga Ishockey	14	10	2	2	66:37	24(2)
2.	Storhamar Ishockey	14	9	1	4	66:49	23(4)
3.	Lillehammer IK	14	7	2	5	43:36	19(3)
4.	Stjernen	14	7	1	6	66:55	16(1)
5.	Trondheim IK	14	7	1	6	56:57	15(0)
6.	Sparta Sarpsborg	14	5	0	9	49:72	10(0)
7.	Manglerud Star Ishockey	14	4	1	9	46:60	9(0)
8.	Viking IK	14	3	0	11	36:62	6(0)

== Playoff Qualification ==
=== Group A ===
	Club	GP	W	T	L	GF–GA	Pts
1.	Vålerenga Ishockey	2	2	0	0	13:4	4
2.	Stjernen	2	1	0	1	14:8	2
3.	Trondheim IK	2	0	0	2	4:19	0

=== Group B ===
	Club	GP	W	T	L	GF–GA	Pts
1.	Storhamar Ishockey	2	1	0	1	7:4	2
2.	Lillehammer IK	2	1	0	1	8:6	2
3.	Sparta Sarpsborg	2	1	0	1	3:8	2

== Playoffs ==
Semi-finals
Storhamar Ishockey	2
Stjernen	0
Vålerenga Ishockey	0
Lillehammer IK	2

Final
Storhamar Ishockey	1
Lillehammer IK	3
Third place
not played

== Relegation ==
	Club	GP	W	T	L	GF–GA	Pts
1.	Viking IK	6	5	1	0	39:15	11
2.	Manglerud Star Ishockey	6	3	2	1	29:17	8
3.	Bergen IK	6	2	0	4	21:29	4
4.	Furuset IF	6	0	1	5	12:40	1
