= Trondheim Black Panthers =

- City: Trondheim, Norway
- Founded: 1986
- Folded: 2008
- Home arena: Leangen Ishall (capacity: 3,000)
- Colours: Black, red, yellow

Franchise history
- Trondheim Ishockeyklubb

The Trondheim Black Panthers, founded 18 June 1986 as Trondheim Ishockeyklubb, is a defunct ice hockey club which was based in Trondheim, Norway. They played their home games in Leangen Ishall and were members of the highest ice hockey league in Norway from 1987 until 2008. During this time, they won the League Championship twice, in 1988–89 and 1991–92, and were twice runners-up in the Norwegian Ice Hockey Championship, in 1989 and 2005. The club folded on 3 March 2008 due to severe financial problems. The existing club Rosenborg then emerged as Trondheim's number one team. Rosenborg will play in Division One throughout the 2008–09 campaign. Several of the Trondheim players signed with Rosenborg.

Their team colours were black, red and yellow.

== History ==
The history of Trondheim Ishockeyklubb started in 1986 with the merger of the ice hockey sections of Astor and Strindheim IL. It was eminent that if they should be able to challenge the hockey hierarchy in the south of Norway, Trondheim could not afford to have three clubs fighting for the right to do so (Rosenborg withdrew at an early stage of the merger). Strindheim had proven the strength of icehockey in Trondheim by gaining promotion to the top league in 1984, and at the same time shown the weakness by losing all 18 games heavily.

Trondheim IK, or TIK for short, soon made their presence known gaining promotion at the first attempt, and then start challenging for honours. With backing from local investors they soon started signing some of the biggest names in Norwegian ice hockey. Rune Gulliksen, Jim Marthinsen and Geir Myhre along with foreign talent in Stanislav Hajdušek and Vladislav Vlček, the first Czech players to play in Norway, TIK had a formidable team. They did not win any major honours apart from the league championship in 1988–89. During the same season they also qualified for the playoff final, only to lose to outsiders Sparta.

The title challenge proved costly, and after a financial down most of the star players left. In a couple of seasons the club hit back, however, this time fuelled by their renowned "Canada line". Dallas Gaume, Doug Derraugh and Rob Doroshuk proved the most effective line in Norwegian hockey. With a growing number of local players coming through TIK again challenged for honours, winning another league championship in 1992.

Success came at cost and through the nineties Trondheim's existence were in dire straits at many occasions. In the end the ship was steadied and in a great 2004–05 season the now called Black Panthers made it into their second play off final in history. Strengthened by locked-out NHLer Mark Bell they challenged Vålerenga Ishockey hard but finally had to give in.

Again success was short-lived and in a cataclysmic 2005–06 season everything went wrong. The economy again crashed, new signings failed and in the end they had to qualify to keep their place in the league. Add a couple of off-ice scandals and Trondheim had suffered an annus horribilis of great magnitude. This was topped during the summer when the Norwegian Ice Hockey Federation denied the club licence to play in the league due to their economic situation. Only after intervention from the other clubs TIK got a few days respite, and finally were able to put things right and continue play in the league.

The GET-liga legacy of Trondheim was picked up by Rosenborg in 2010.

== Season-by-season results ==
This is a partial list of the last five seasons completed by the Black Panthers. For the full season-by-season history, see List of Trondheim Black Panthers seasons.

| Norwegian Champions | Regular season champions | Promoted | Relegated |

| Season | League | Regular season | | | | | | | | | | Postseason |
| Season | League | GP | W | L | T | OTW | OTL | GF | GA | Pts | Finish | Postseason |
|---|---|---|---|---|---|---|---|---|---|---|---|---|
| 2003–04 | Eliteserien | 42 | 25 | 12 | — | 3 | 2 | 160 | 100 | 83 | 3rd | Lost in Quarter-finals, 1–3 (Stavanger) |
| 2004–05 | Eliteserien | 42 | 25 | 12 | — | 3 | 2 | 154 | 101 | 83 | 2nd | Lost in Finals, 1–4 (Vålerenga) |
| 2005–06 | Eliteserien | 42 | 10 | 23 | — | 6 | 3 | 114 | 151 | 45 | 9th | 1st in Qualifying for Eliteserien |
| 2006–07 | Eliteserien | 44 | 5 | 35 | — | 3 | 1 | 112 | 214 | 22 | 10th | 1st in Qualifying for Eliteserien |
| 2007–08 | Eliteserien | 44 | 5 | 34 | — | 3 | 2 | 114 | 211 | 23 | 10th | Did not participate |
