= IF Frisk Asker =

Norwegian sports club

- Full name: Idrettsforeningen Frisk Asker
- Founded: 5 February 1922
- Ground: Risenga, Asker
- League: none (football)
Home colours

Idrettsforeningen Frisk Asker is a Norwegian sports club from Asker, Akershus. It has sections for association football and ice hockey. It also used to play bandy.

== Ice hockey ==
The men's ice hockey team are one of Norway's leading teams. Their home arena is Varner Arena. They have won three championships.

== Football ==
The football section has struggled in the later years. The women's section has cooperated with Bødalen IF and Vollen UL to form a team called Amasone Asker FK, established on 8 March 2009. The club does not currently field a men's team.
