= Viking IK =

- City: Stavanger, Norway
- League: Eliteserien
- Founded: 1987 (split from IL Viking)

Viking IK was an ice hockey team in Stavanger, Norway.

The club was originally a part of the multi-sports club IL Viking, but became independent in 1987. The club played in the arena Siddishallen from 1968, and played in the First Division, the top level of Norwegian ice hockey, from 1978-1996. Viking IK went bankrupt after the 1996 season.
