= Stjernen Hockey =

Stjernen
- City: Fredrikstad, Norway
- League: EliteHockey Ligaen
- Founded: 1960; 66 years ago
- Home arena: Stjernehallen
- Colors: Red and white
- General manager: Anders Åsle
- Head coach: Fredrik Johansson
- Captain: Brendan Ellis
- Website: stjernen.no

Championships
- Regular season titles: (1) 1986/1987
- Playoff championships: (2) 1981, 1986

Stjernen Hockey is a Norwegian ice hockey team based in Fredrikstad, Norway. They currently play in the EliteHockey Ligaen. They play their home games in Stjernehallen. Their team colours are red and white.

== History ==
Stjernen was founded in 1960 when the boys club "the Star" simply translated their name to Norwegian to comply with the rules of the association to begin play in the league system. After ten years of playing on an outdoor rink, or hiring ice time from local rivals Sparta Sarpsborg, Stjernen got their own arena in 1970 when Stjernehallen was officially opened.

With a good youth organisation to go with the new facilities, Stjernen soon started to climb in the leagues and in 1974 they reached the first division for the first time in club history.

In 1981, the club saw its finest day beating Vålerenga Ishockey 2–1 in the best of three play-off final becoming the first team outside Oslo to hoist the cup. Upon returning to Fredrikstad they were met by a crowd of several thousand people carrying torches, cheering the newly crowned champions.

With star players in the shape of Ørjan Løvdal, Rune Gulliksen, Hans Edlund, Pål Gjermundsen and later even Morten Finstad and colourful Canadian forward Chris St.Cyr Stjernen was the team to beat throughout the 1980s. Championship success however was repeated only once. In 1986 outsiders Frisk were well beaten in the final.

Although Stjernen remained a force well into the 1990s they never managed to add to their two titles. Playing two more finals in 1992 and 1995 they failed both times to add to the silverware.

During the late 1990s, the club fell into recession due to economic difficulties and failings in the youth department. Having nearly been bankrupted on a couple of occasions the club has started rebuilding and came back into the top during the 05-06-season when they finished second in the league and was extremely close to making the play-off final. The team largely built around foreign talent however disintegrated after the season, and the new crop of players did not hold the same standard, leaving the club to fight for a place in this year's play-off.

== Season-by-season results ==
This is a partial list of the last ten seasons completed by Stjernen. For the full season-by-season history, see List of Stjernen Hockey seasons.

Norwegian Champions	Regular Season Champions	Promoted	Relegated

Season	League	Regular season									Playoffs
Season	League	GP	W	L	OTW	OTL	GF	GA	Pts	Finish	Playoffs
2013–14	Eliteserien	45	11	29	3	2	104	186	41	9th	1st in Qualifying for Eliteserien
2014–15	Eliteserien	45	16	25	3	1	127	170	47	8th	Lost in Quarter-finals, 0–4 (Stavanger)
2015–16	Eliteserien	45	15	21	4	5	145	164	58	7th	Lost in Quarter-finals, 2–4 (Lørenskog)
2016–17	Eliteserien	45	20	17	3	5	142	136	71	7th	Lost in Quarter-finals, 0–4 (Stavanger)
2017–18	Eliteserien	45	9	25	6	5	96	144	44	9th	1st in Qualifying for Eliteserien
2018–19	Eliteserien	48	9	31	3	5	115	214	38	8th	Lost in Quarter-finals, 0–4 (Storhamar)
2019–20	Eliteserien	45	19	22	3	1	150	148	61	7th	Cancelled due to the COVID-19 pandemic
2020–21	Eliteserien	24	11	10	3	0	97	79	39	6th	Cancelled due to the COVID-19 pandemic
2021–22	Eliteserien	43	23	11	6	3	157	112	84	2nd	Lost in Semi-finals, 1–4 (Storhamar)
2022–23	Eliteserien	45	27	11	2	5	186	122	90	5th	Lost in Quarter-finals, 0–4 (Sparta)

== Players and personnel ==
=== Retired numbers ===
Retired numbers
No.	Player	Position	Career	Number retirement
12	Ørjan Løvdal	C	1985–1997	1 March 2015
18	Morten Finstad	C	1986–2001	1 March 2015

== Notable players ==
- Henrik Höglund
- Pål Grotnes
- Linus Kjell
- Mats Knutsen
- Johan Olsson
