= Sparta Sarpsborg =

Ice hockey team club in Sarpsborg, Norway

- City: Sarpsborg, Norway
- League: 2. Divjsion
- Founded: 1928; 98 years ago
- Home arena: Sparta Amfi
- Colors: Blue, gold and white
- Head coach: Sjur Robert Nilsen
- Captain: Niklas Roest
- Affiliates: Comet Halden (1. div)
- Website: sparta.no

Championships
- Regular season titles: 4
- Playoff championships: 1984, 1989, 2011

Ishockeyklubben Sparta Sarpsborg is a Norwegian ice hockey team based in Sarpsborg, Norway. They formerly played in EliteHockey Ligaen; on 16 September 2026 they declared bankruptcy and dissolved. The team was rebuilt by board chairman Petter Witnes and currently plays in the 2. Divjsion. They play their home games in the Sparta Amfi arena and is Norway's oldest ice hockey rink. The team colours were blue and white.

== History ==
The ice hockey department of IL Sparta was founded in 1958, and got off to a fantastic start when Norway's first indoor hockey arena, Sparta Amfi, was opened in 1963. Within three years, they earned promotion to the Eliteserien (first division) as the first team outside Oslo to do so. It was only to be a short stint, and through most part of the late 1960s and 1970s, Sparta spent their time in the second division, with occasional visits to the top flight.

The 1980s was to be Sparta's greatest decade. Under the leadership of coach Lasse Bäckman and strengthened by several strong signings from other Norwegian clubs and a couple of Swedish stars, they claimed the Norwegian Championships in 1984. The feat was repeated in 1989, when the club beat heavily favoured Trondheim in the final after claiming the last playoff spot.

Economic problems followed this success, and in 1995 Sparta filed for bankruptcy, the only sports club in Norway ever to do so. This meant that they had to start from scratch in the third division, and they lost their best players to other clubs in Norway. However, many of these players subsequently returned to Sparta, and in 1997 they were back in the Eliteserien, where they have remained since.

In 2004, the team was rebranded as Sparta Warriors.

In the 2008–09 season, the team won the league, and won silver in the Norwegian Championship after being defeated by Vålerenga in the final.

In 2020, the team was rebranded as Sparta Sarpsborg.

The song I'm Forever Blowing Bubbles is known as the club anthem of Sparta Warriors.

== Season-by-season results ==
This is a partial list of the last ten seasons completed by Sparta Sarpsborg. For the full season-by-season history, see List of Sparta Sarpsborg seasons.

Norwegian Champions	Regular Season Champions	Promoted	Relegated

Season	League	Regular season									Playoffs
Season	League	GP	W	L	OTW	OTL	GF	GA	Pts	Finish	Playoffs
2013–14	EHL	45	23	16	3	3	136	104	78	4th	Lost in Quarter-finals, 1–4 (Storhamar)
2014–15	EHL	45	26	14	0	5	176	122	83	3rd	Lost in Semi-finals, 1–4 (Storhamar)
2015–16	EHL	45	24	12	5	4	172	138	86	4th	Lost in Quarter-finals, 2–4 (Storhamar)
2016–17	EHL	45	18	20	1	6	128	111	62	8th	Lost in Semi-finals, 0–4 (Stavanger)
2017–18	EHL	45	25	10	8	2	152	109	93	2nd	Lost in Semi-finals, 0–4 (Lillehammer)
2018–19	EHL	48	18	18	5	7	137	141	71	6th	Lost in Quarter-finals, 2–4 (Stavanger)
2019–20	EHL	45	18	20	5	2	144	130	66	6th	Cancelled due to the COVID-19 pandemic
2020–21	EHL	19	4	11	3	1	51	64	19	7th	Cancelled due to the COVID-19 pandemic
2021–22	EHL	45	23	12	6	4	150	102	85	3rd	Lost in Semi-finals, 3–4 (Stavanger)
2022–23	EHL	45	24	11	8	2	148	99	90	4th	Lost in Semi-finals, 0–4 (Stavanger)

== Records and statistics ==
Scoring leader statistics for regular season only. Matches played statistic includes playoff games.

- – current active player

=== Scoring leaders ===
Points
Player	Seasons	Pos	GP	G	A	Pts	PPG
Per Christian Knold	1986-2005	LW	635	275	384	659	1.03
Stephen Foyn	1986-1991	LW	315	255	343	598	1.89
Jonas Solberg Andersen	1998-2013	RW	596	246	303	549	0.92
Henrik Malmström	2008-2018	LW	432	195	289	484	1.12
Petter Witnes	2001-2015	C	519	105	224	329	0.63
Sivert Andersson	1984-1988	C	134	173	134	307	2.29
Bjørn Freddy Bekkerud	1986-1997	LW	282	110	195	305	1.08
Niklas Roest	2006-	C	454	112	178	290	0.63
Reino Johansen		C	359	164	85	249	0.69
Dion Knelsen	2010-2016	C	178	101	132	233	1.30

=== Most league matches ===
Matches
Player	Career	Matches
Per Christian Knold	1986-2005	635
Jonas Solberg Andersen	1998-2013	596
Niklas Roest	2006-	568
Petter Witnes	2001-2015	519
Per Tengvert	2002-2012	505
Henrik Malmström	2008-2018	497
Rene Bøe	2000-2011	415
Pål Raab Lien	1996-2003	408
Reino Johansen		359
Bjarte Bjønnes	1998-2008	339

Last updated: 29 May 2018
Source: http://stats.sparta.no/

== Famous players ==
- Per-Åge Skrøder
- Matthew Yeats
- Jonas Holøs
- Martin Røymark
- Per Christian Knold
