= Furuset Ishockey =

- City: Oslo, Norway
- League: 1. divisjon
- Founded: 1934; 92 years ago
- Home arena: Furuset Forum
- Colors: Blue, white
- General manager: Jan-Georg Flinstad
- Head coach: Sindre Jessen
- Captain: Martin Ytterstad
- Affiliates: Manglerud Star (GET-ligaen)
- Website: http://www.furuset.no/

Championships
- Regular season titles: 4
- Playoff championships: 1949, 1951, 1952, 1954, 1980, 1983, 1990

Furuset Ishockey is an Oslo-based ice hockey club, and a part of the Furuset IF multi-sports club. They play their home games in Furuset Forum. Their team colours are blue and white.

== History ==
Furuset is one of the founding members of the Norwegian Ice hockey association, they had a head start on many opponents.

In December 2008 the club announced that it was on the verge of bankruptcy and that it had informed all players that they were not longer contractually obliged to remain in the club and that the issuance of wages was in jeopardy.

Furuset won their first of seven Norwegian Championships in 1949 to start off the first golden era in club history. Led on by the legendary Leif Solheim they went on to claim a further three championships during the fifties.

The club was unable to replace the great players as the championship team slowly disintegrated. Furuset was soon overtaken by other Oslo clubs, and in the end fell into the lower leagues.

It was not until the early eighties that Furuset re-emerged as a great. Having gained promotion to the top league in the late seventies a fine group of young players blossomed in the limelight of the first division. None of them greater than Ketil Aurstad. Bjørn Skaare, the first Norwegian to play in the NHL, is also a famous player. He led the team to the Norwegian championship in 1980.This achievement was repeated in 1983, during a period characterized by the development of a prominent generation of players. Furusets last championship was claimed in 1990 with players such as Petter Salsten, Ole Eskild Dahlstrøm and Steve Allman as the leading lights.

After the successes of the early nineties, culminating with an appearance in the play off finals in 1993 Furuset faced an economical crisis. Most of their top players left for bigger clubs, and relegation once again was on the cards. The club spent most of the late nineties and early 2000s as an elevator club between the two top leagues. In the 2015-16 season, Furuset was relegated to the third tier of Norwegian hockey, 2. divisjon, but was later moved up to the second tier again following the failure of Nes IK to reach league requirements.

== Season-by-season results ==
This is a partial list of the last five seasons completed by Furuset. For the full season-by-season history, see List of Furuset Ishockey seasons.

Norwegian Champions	Regular Season Champions	Promoted	Relegated

Season	League	Regular season										Postseason
Season	League	GP	W	L	T	OTW	OTL	GF	GA	Pts	Finish	Postseason
2013–14	1. divisjon	36	4	24	—	3	5	81	156	23	12th	Did not qualify
2014–15	1. divisjon	36	11	18	—	2	5	125	162	42	7th	Did not qualify
2015–16	1. divisjon	36	9	22	—	0	5	104	176	32	9th	3rd in Qualifying for 1. divisjon^{1}
2016–17	1. divisjon	36	9	20	—	3	4	109	155	37	8th	Did not qualify
2017–18	1. divisjon	32	5	21	—	0	6	76	144	21	8th	Did not qualify

^{1} Nes IK failed to renew its professional license to play in the 1. divisjon.

== Players ==
=== Retired numbers ===
Retired numbers
No.	Player	Position	Career	Number retirement
7	Bjørn Skaare	C	1975–1976, 1979–1981, 1982–1985	
