= 1966–67 Norwegian 1. Divisjon season =

Sports season

The 1966–67 Norwegian 1. Divisjon season was the 28th season of ice hockey in Norway. Eight teams participated in the league, and Valerenga Ishockey won the championship.

== First round ==
	Club	GP	W	T	L	GF–GA	Pts
1.	Vålerenga Ishockey	14	14	0	0	96:32	28
2.	Gamlebyen	14	9	1	4	61:38	19
3.	Tigrene	14	7	1	6	37:37	15
4.	Grüner Allianseidrettslag	14	6	2	6	61:45	14
5.	Rosenhoff IL	14	6	1	7	56:68	13
6.	Jar	14	4	3	7	34:56	11
7.	Hasle-Løren Idrettslag	14	4	1	9	46:63	9
8.	Allianseidrettslaget Skeid	14	1	1	12	28:80	3

== Final round ==
	Club	GP	W	T	L	GF–GA	Pts
1.	Vålerenga Ishockey	3	3	0	0	17:5	6
2.	Gamlebyen	3	2	0	1	14:6	4
3.	Tigrene	3	0	1	2	8:15	1
4.	Grüner Allianseidrettslag	3	0	1	2	6:19	1
