= 1952–53 Norwegian 1. Divisjon season =

Sports season

The 1952–53 Norwegian 1. Divisjon season was the 14th season of ice hockey in Norway. Eight teams participated in the league, and Gamlebyen won the championship.

== Regular season ==
	Club	GP	W	T	L	GF–GA	Pts
1.	Gamlebyen	14	11	1	2	74:30	23
2.	Furuset IF	14	10	2	2	76:25	22
3.	Mode	14	9	0	5	54:42	18
4.	Hasle	14	8	1	5	54:55	17
5.	Allianseidrettslaget Skeid	14	5	4	6	41:31	14
6.	Stabæk IF	14	5	1	8	33:58	11
7.	Grüner Allianseidrettslag	14	1	2	11	23:69	4
8.	Vålerenga Ishockey	14	1	1	12	27:72	3
