= 1958–59 Norwegian 1. Divisjon season =

Sports season

The 1958–59 Norwegian 1. Divisjon season was the 20th season of ice hockey in Norway. Eight teams participated in the league, and Gamlebyen won the championship.

== Regular season ==
	Club	GP	W	T	L	GF–GA	Pts
1.	Gamlebyen	14	12	1	1	94:21	25
2.	Furuset IF	14	8	2	4	81:50	18
3.	Vålerenga Ishockey	14	8	0	6	51:52	16
4.	Hasle	14	6	2	6	39:62	14
5.	Tigrene	14	5	3	6	45:43	13
6.	Allianseidrettslaget Skeid	14	5	3	6	50:56	13
7.	Sinsen	14	5	2	7	40:46	12
8.	Løren	14	0	1	13	21:91	1
