= 1959–60 Norwegian 1. Divisjon season =

Sports season

The 1959–60 Norwegian 1. Divisjon season was the 21st season of ice hockey in Norway. Eight teams participated in the league, and Valerenga Ishockey won the championship.

== First round ==
	Club	GP	W	T	L	GF–GA	Pts
1.	Gamlebyen	7	6	0	1	89:19	12
2.	Vålerenga Ishockey	7	6	0	1	70:37	12
3.	Tigrene	7	4	0	3	61:35	8
4.	Allianseidrettslaget Skeid	7	4	0	3	39:42	8
5.	Furuset IF	7	2	0	5	48:50	4
6.	Sinsen	7	2	0	5	37:67	4
7.	Hasle	7	2	0	5	35:85	4
8.	IL Spartacus	7	2	0	5	9:53	4

== Second round ==
=== Final round ===
	Club	GP	W	T	L	GF–GA	Pts
1.	Vålerenga Ishockey	6	6	0	0	38:15	12
2.	Gamlebyen	6	4	0	2	25:20	8
3.	Tigrene	6	2	0	4	16:26	4
4.	Allianseidrettslaget Skeid	6	0	0	6	11:29	0

=== Relegation round ===
	Club	GP	W	T	L	GF–GA	Pts
5.	Furuset IF	6	5	0	1	34:15	10
6.	Hasle	6	4	0	2	23:20	8
7.	Sinsen	6	3	0	3	22:19	6
8.	IL Spartacus	6	0	0	6	10:35	0
