= 1953–54 Norwegian 1. Divisjon season =

Sports season

The 1953–54 Norwegian 1. Divisjon season was the 15th season of ice hockey in Norway. Eight teams participated in the league, and Furuset IF won the championship.

== Regular season ==
	Club	GP	W	T	L	GF–GA	Pts
1.	Furuset IF	14	10	1	3	99:44	21
2.	Gamlebyen	14	9	3	2	73:31	21
3.	Allianseidrettslaget Skeid	14	9	2	3	65:35	20
4.	Tigrene	14	6	3	5	57:53	15
5.	Hasle	14	4	3	7	64:74	11
6.	Mode	14	5	1	8	45:59	11
7.	Stabæk IF	14	4	2	8	45:63	10
8.	Løren	14	1	0	13	28:104	2

=== Final tiebreaker ===
- Furuset IF - Gamlebyen 4:3
