= 1965–66 Norwegian 1. Divisjon season =

Sports season

The 1965–66 Norwegian 1. Divisjon season was the 27th season of ice hockey in Norway. Six teams participated in the league, and Valerenga Ishockey won the championship.

== Regular season ==
	Club	GP	W	T	L	GF–GA	Pts
1.	Vålerenga Ishockey	15	13	0	2	92:40	26
2.	Gamlebyen	15	11	0	4	82:37	22
3.	Tigrene	15	9	0	6	72:58	18
4.	Grüner Allianseidrettslag	15	4	1	10	30:62	9
5.	Hasle-Løren Idrettslag	15	3	2	10	47:72	8
6.	Allianseidrettslaget Skeid	15	2	2	11	41:91	6
