= 1957–58 Norwegian 1. Divisjon season =

Sports season

The 1957–58 Norwegian 1. Divisjon season was the 19th season of ice hockey in Norway. Eight teams participated in the league, and Gamlebyen won the championship.

== Regular season ==
	Club	GP	W	T	L	GF–GA	Pts
1.	Gamlebyen	14	13	0	1	89:19	26
2.	Vålerenga Ishockey	14	10	1	3	70:37	21
3.	Tigrene	14	10	1	3	61:35	21
4.	Sinsen	14	7	1	6	39:42	15
5.	Allianseidrettslaget Skeid	14	6	1	7	48:50	13
6.	Løren	14	5	0	9	37:67	10
7.	Høvik	14	3	0	11	35:85	6
8.	Sagene	14	0	0	14	9:53	0
