= 1973–74 Norwegian 1. Divisjon season =

Norwegian ice hockey league season

The 1973–74 Norwegian 1. Divisjon season was the 35th season of ice hockey in Norway. Ten teams participated in the league, and Hasle-Loren Idrettslag won the championship.

== First round ==
	Club	GP	W	T	L	GF–GA	Pts
1.	Frisk Asker	18	18	0	0	128:40	36
2.	Hasle-Løren Idrettslag	18	14	1	3	129:57	29
3.	Vålerenga Ishockey	18	11	2	5	92:56	24
4.	Jar IL	18	9	1	8	77:77	19
5.	Manglerud Star	18	8	3	7	55:61	19
6.	Grüner/Hugin	18	7	1	10	60:92	15
7.	Furuset IF	18	5	3	10	44:88	13
8.	Allianseidrettslaget Skeid	18	5	3	10	62:89	13
9.	Sparta Sarpsborg	18	3	3	12	56:89	9
10.	Forward Flyers	18	1	1	16	48:126	3

Source: Elite Prospects

== Second round ==
=== Final round ===
	Club	GP	W	T	L	GF–GA	Pts
1.	Frisk Asker	10	7	1	2	66:29	15
2.	Hasle-Løren Idrettslag	10	7	1	2	62:38	15
3.	Vålerenga Ishockey	10	5	1	4	45:36	11
4.	Manglerud Star	10	5	0	5	36:45	10
5.	Jar IL	10	4	0	6	40:62	8
6.	Grüner/Hugin	10	0	1	9	27:66	1

Source: Elite Prospects

==== Final tiebreaker ====
- Hasle-Løren Idrettslag - Frisk Asker 3:0

=== Relegation round ===
	Club	GP	W	T	L	GF–GA	Pts
7.	Sparta Sarpsborg	6	5	0	1	33:12	10
8.	Furuset IF	6	4	0	2	29:21	8
9.	Allianseidrettslaget Skeid	6	3	0	3	30:23	6
10.	Forward Flyers	6	0	0	6	18:54	0

Source: Elite Prospects
