= 1954–55 Norwegian 1. Divisjon season =

Sports season

The 1954–55 Norwegian 1. Divisjon season was the 16th season of ice hockey in Norway. Eight teams participated in the league, and Gamlebyen won the championship.

== Regular season ==
	Club	GP	W	T	L	GF–GA	Pts
1.	Gamlebyen	14	12	1	1	82:21	25
2.	Tigrene	14	11	2	1	60:19	24
3.	Allianseidrettslaget Skeid	14	8	1	5	61:35	17
4.	SBK Drafn	14	6	3 5	44:46	15	
5.	Hasle	14	5	1	8	49:50	11
6.	Furuset IF	14	4	2	8	45:58	10
7.	Grüner Allianseidrettslag	13	1	3	9	22:72	5
8.	Mode	13	1	1	11	21:83	3
