= 1949–50 Norwegian 1. Divisjon season =

Sports season

The 1949–50 Norwegian 1. Divisjon season was the 11th season of ice hockey in Norway. Eight teams participated in the league, and Gamlebyen won the championship.

== Regular season ==
	Club	GP	W	T	L	GF–GA	Pts
1.	Gamlebyen	7	5	1	1	35:18	11
2.	Furuset IF	7	5	0	2	45:21	10
3.	Stabæk IF	7	4	1	2	33:29	9
4.	Templar	7	3	1	3	15:18	7
5.	Mode	7	3	1	3	26:12	7
6.	Allianseidrettslaget Skeid	7	3	0	4	26:34	6
7.	Hasle	7	1	1	5	21:29	3
8.	Løren	7	0	1	6	17:47	1
