= 1951–52 Norwegian 1. Divisjon season =

Sports season

The 1951–52 Norwegian 1. Divisjon season was the 13th season of ice hockey in Norway. Eight teams participated in the league, and Furuset IF won the championship.

== Regular season ==
	Club	GP	W	T	L	GF–GA	Pts
1.	Furuset IF	7	5	1	1	39:16	11
2.	Gamlebyen	7	4	1	2	31:13	9
3.	Mode	7	4	1	2	25:19	9
4.	Stabæk IF	7	3	3	1	21:22	9
5.	Allianseidrettslaget Skeid	7	3	2	2	24:18	8
6.	Hasle	7	2	1	4	14:33	5
7.	Tigrene	7	1	2	4	18:21	4
8.	Løren	7	0	1	6	8:36	1
