= 1936–37 Hovedserien season =

Sports season

The 1936–37 Hovedserien season was the third season of ice hockey in Norway. Eight teams participated in the league, and Grane won the championship.

== First round ==
=== Group A ===
	Club	GP	W	T	L	GF–GA	Pts
1.	Grane	6	6	0	0	25:5	12
2.	Sportsklubben Forward	6	3	1	2	16:18	7
3.	Holmen Hockey	6	1	1	4	14:17	3
4.	Gjøa Ishockey	6	1	0	5	6:21	2

=== Group B ===
	Club	GP	W	T	L	GF–GA	Pts
1.	Ski- og Fotballklubben Trygg	6	3	2	1	4:2	8
2.	Hasle-Løren Idrettslag	6	2	2	2	8:9	6
3.	Sportsklubben Strong	6	2	1	3	10:10	5
4.	Furuset Ishockey	6	1	3	2	6:7	5

== Final ==
- Grane - Ski- og Fotballklubben Trygg 1:1/2:1

== Relegation ==
=== First round ===
- Furuset Ishockey - Gjøa Ishockey 1:0

=== Second round ===
- Stabæk Idrettsforening - Gjøa Ishockey 2:0
