= 1937–38 Hovedserien season =

Sports season

The 1937–38 Hovedserien season was the fourth season of ice hockey in Norway. Eight teams participated in the league, and Ski- og Fotballklubben Trygg won the championship.

== First round ==
=== Group A ===
	Club	GP	W	T	L	GF–GA	Pts
1.	Grane	6	6	0	0	33:2	12
2.	Sportsklubben Forward	6	2	1	3	8:17	5
3.	Furuset Ishockey	6	1	2	3	4:14	4
4.	Sportsklubben Strong	6	0	3	3	1:13	3

=== Group B ===
	Club	GP	W	T	L	GF–GA	Pts
1.	Ski- og Fotballklubben Trygg	6	4	1	1	10:5	9
2.	Holmen Hockey	6	3	1	2	9:6	7
3.	Hasle-Løren Idrettslag	6	3	0	3	6:7	6
4.	Stabæk Idrettsforening	6	0	1	5	5:12	2

== Final ==
- Ski- og Fotballklubben Trygg - Grane 2:0

== Relegation ==
=== First round ===
- Sportsklubben Strong - Stabæk Idrettsforening

=== Second round ===
- B.14 - Stabæk Idrettsforening
