= 1948–49 Norwegian 1. Divisjon season =

1948-49 Norwegian hockey season

The 1948–49 Norwegian 1. Divisjon season was the tenth season of ice hockey in Norway. Eight teams participated in the league, and Furuset IF won the championship.

== Regular season ==
	Club	GP	W	T	L	GF-GA	Pts
1.	Furuset IF	7	6	1	0	31:18	13
2.	IL Mode	7	5	2	0	30:8	12
3.	Gamlebyen	7	5	1	1	30:14	11
4.	Templar	7	4	0	3	21:16	8
5.	Stabæk IF	7	3	0	4	17:37	6
6.	Hasle	7	2	0	5	29:39	4
7.	Sportsklubben Strong	7	1	0	6	23:32	2
8.	Frisk Asker	7	0	0	7	2:19	0
