= 1961–62 Norwegian 1. Divisjon season =

Sports season

The 1961–62 Norwegian 1. Divisjon season was the 23rd season of ice hockey in Norway. Eight teams participated in the league, and Valerenga Ishockey won the championship.

== Regular season ==
	Club	GP	W	T	L	GF–GA	Pts
1.	Vålerenga Ishockey	14	12	0	2	78:23	24
2.	Tigrene	14	11	0	3	82:26	22
3.	Gamlebyen	14	9	0	5	65:38	18
4.	Allianseidrettslaget Skeid	14	9	0	5	77:52	18
5.	Rosenhoff IL	14	6	0	8	57:78	12
6.	Furuset IF	14	4	0	10	47:70	8
7.	Sinsen IF	14	3	0	11	43:94	6
8.	Hasle	14	2	0	12	31:98	4
