= 1976–77 Norwegian 1. Divisjon season =

Norwegian ice hockey league season

The 1976–77 Norwegian 1. Divisjon season was the 38th season of ice hockey in Norway. Ten teams participated in the league, and Manglerud Star won the championship.

== First round ==
	Club	GP	W	T	L	GF–GA	Pts
1.	Frisk Asker	18	15	2	1	127:39	32
2.	Manglerud Star Ishockey	18	13	3	2	124:43	29
3.	Vålerenga Ishockey	18	14	1	3	124:64	29
4.	Hasle-Løren Idrettslag	18	11	2	5	151:70	24
5.	Stjernen	18	10	3	5	105:78	23
6.	Furuset IF	18	5	2	11	59:111	12
7.	Jar IL	18	5	1	12	80:104	11
8.	Allianseidrettslaget Skeid	18	4	2	12	63:134	10
9.	Lambertseter	18	2	1	15	61:143	5
10.	Grüner IL	18	2	1	15	41:149	5

== Second round ==
=== Final round ===
	Club	GP	W	T	L	GF–GA	Pts
1.	Manglerud Star Ishockey	10	9	1	0	57:27	19
2.	Hasle-Løren Idrettslag	10	8	1	1	71:29	17
3.	Frisk Asker	10	6	0	4	60:32	12
4.	Vålerenga Ishockey	10	4	0	6	48:50	8
5.	Stjernen	10	1	0	9	34:75	2
6.	Furuset IF	10	1	0	9	24:81	2

=== Relegation round ===
	Club	GP	W	T	L	GF–GA	Pts
7.	Jar IL	6	4	1	1	41:21	9
8.	Lambertseter	6	4	0	2	32:31	8
9.	Allianseidrettslaget Skeid	6	2	1	3	33:30	5
10.	Grüner IL	6	1	0	5	20:44	2
