= 1946–47 Norwegian 1. Divisjon season =

Sports season

The 1946–47 Norwegian 1. Divisjon season was the eighth season of ice hockey in Norway. Nine teams participated in the league, and Mode won the championship.

== Regular season ==
	Club	GP	W	T	L	GF–GA	Pts
1.	Mode	8	5	3	0	44:10	13
2.	Sportsklubben Strong	8	5	2	1	18:9	12
3.	Hasle	8	5	2	1	33:13	12
4.	Stabæk IF	8	5	2	1	27:17	12
5.	Sportsklubben Forward	8	4	2	2	53:17	10
6.	Holmen Hockey	8	2	1	5	20:33	6
7.	Idrettslaget Heming	8	2	0	6	22:55	4
8.	Løren	8	1	0	7	10:39	2
9.	Frisk Asker	8	1	0	7	16:50	2
