= Bjørn Skaare =

Norwegian ice hockey player (1958–1989)

- Born: 29 October 1958 Oslo, Norway
- Died: 21 June 1989 (aged 30) Örebro County, Sweden
- Height: 6 ft 0 in (183 cm)
- Weight: 180 lb (82 kg; 12 st 12 lb)
- Position: Centre
- Shot: Left
- Played for: NHL; Detroit Red Wings; Other; Furuset; Färjestad; Ottawa 67's Klagenfurt; Bergen/Djerv
- National team: Norway
- NHL draft: 62nd overall, 1978; Detroit Red Wings
- Playing career: 1976–1988

Bjørn Skaare (29 October 1958 – 21 June 1989) was a Norwegian ice hockey player. He was the first Norwegian to play in the NHL, playing a single game with the Detroit Red Wings during the 1978–79 NHL season.

== Playing career ==
Skaare's talent was evident at an early age. He made his debut for Furuset before he had turned 16. In 1976, he was signed by Färjestad of the Swedish Elitserien, although he returned to Furuset within a year. In the fall of 1977, Skaare moved to Canada, where he was signed by the Ottawa 67's of the Ontario Hockey League, where he became a teammate of future NHL star Bobby Smith. Skaare scored 12 goals and had 30 assists for Ottawa, and was drafted in the 4th round (62nd pick overall) of the 1978 NHL entry draft by the Detroit Red Wings.

Skaare was assigned to the Kansas City Red Wings of the Central Hockey League. After an impressive play for Kansas City, he was called up to Detroit. He made his NHL debut against the Colorado Rockies on November 29, 1978. However, this would also be Skaare's only appearance in the NHL. He picked up an injury when he was checked by Barry Beck, and was later sent back to Kansas City. Skaare had 8 goals and 26 assists in 37 games for Kansas City, but decided to move back to Norway in February 1979.

Back in Norway, Skaare helped Furuset win the Norwegian championship in 1981 and 1983. He was named player of the year in 1981, earning him the Golden Puck. In 1981–82, he played for Klagenfurt of the Austrian hockey league, and was named the league's best player. However, Skaare was homesick, and once again moved back to Furuset.

In 1984, he briefly returned to North America, playing for the Tulsa Oilers of the Central Hockey League, but once again returned home within a few months. He was a member of the Tulsa Oilers (CHL) team that suspended operations on February 16, 1984, playing only road games for the final six weeks of the 1983–84 season. Despite this adversity, the team went on to win the league's championship. Skaare played in all nine playoff games, scoring nine points to help his team win the Adams Cup.

On the night of 21 June 1989, Skaare was killed in a car accident. He was driving from Norrköping in Sweden towards Oslo. He lost control of the car between Karlskoga and Kristinehamn.

== Championships ==
He won the 1983–84 CHL Championship (Adams Cup) as a member of the Tulsa Oilers team coached by Tom Webster.

His number 7 jersey has been retired by Furuset Ishockey.

== Career statistics ==
=== Regular season and playoffs ===
| | | | Regular season | | | | | Playoffs |
| Season | Team | League | GP | G | A | Pts | PIM | GP | G | A | Pts | PIM |
|---|---|---|---|---|---|---|---|---|---|---|---|---|
| 1975–76 | Furuset IF | NOR | — | — | — | — | — | — | — | — | — | — |
| 1976–77 | Färjestad BK | SWE Jr | 40 | 21 | 20 | 41 | 8 | — | — | — | — | — |
| 1976–77 | Färjestad BK | SWE | 9 | 1 | 0 | 1 | 2 | — | — | — | — | — |
| 1977–78 | Ottawa 67's | OMJHL | 38 | 12 | 30 | 42 | 72 | 13 | 3 | 9 | 12 | 13 |
| 1978–79 | Detroit Red Wings | NHL | 1 | 0 | 0 | 0 | 0 | — | — | — | — | — |
| 1978–79 | Kansas City Red Wings | CHL | 37 | 8 | 26 | 34 | 18 | — | — | — | — | — |
| 1979–80 | Furuset IF | NOR | 27 | 23 | 23 | 46 | — | — | — | — | — | — |
| 1980–81 | Furuset IF | NOR | 33 | 38 | 34 | 72 | 49 | — | — | — | — | — |
| 1981–82 | EC KAC | AUT | 38 | 38 | 38 | 76 | 46 | — | — | — | — | — |
| 1982–83 | Furuset IF | NOR | — | — | — | — | — | — | — | — | — | — |
| 1983–84 | Furuset IF | NOR | 23 | 26 | 38 | 24 | — | — | — | — | — |
| 1983–84 | Tulsa Oilers | CHL | 2 | 1 | 1 | 2 | 5 | 9 | 2 | 7 | 9 | 2 |
| 1984–85 | Furuset IF | NOR | 35 | 32 | 35 | 67 | 35 | — | — | — | — | — |
| 1985–86 | SK Djerv | NOR | — | — | — | — | — | — | — | — | — | — |
| 1986–87 | Bergen/Djerv | NOR | 27 | 22 | 26 | 48 | 16 | — | — | — | — | — |
| 1987–88 | Bergen/Djerv | NOR | 5 | 1 | 3 | 4 | 2 | — | — | — | — | — |
| NOR totals | | | 150 | 142 | 149 | 291 | 126 | — | — | — | — | — |
| NHL totals | | | 1 | 0 | 0 | 0 | 0 | — | — | — | — | — |

=== International ===
| Year | Team | Event | GP | G | A | Pts | PIM |
|---|---|---|---|---|---|---|---|
| 1976 | Norway | WC B |
| 1979 | Norway | WC B | 4 | 2 | 2 | 4 | 8 |
| 1981 | Norway | WC B | 6 | 1 | 2 | 3 | 2 |
| 1984 | Norway | OG | 5 | 0 | 4 | 4 | 4 |
| Tier I Senior totals | | | 5 | 0 | 4 | 4 | 4 |
| Tier II Senior totals | | | 10 | 3 | 4 | 7 | 10 |

== See also ==
- List of players who played only one game in the NHL
- List of ice hockey players who died during their playing career
