= 1956–57 Norwegian 1. Divisjon season =

Sports season

The 1956–57 Norwegian 1. Divisjon season was the 18th season of ice hockey in Norway. Eight teams participated in the league, and Tigrene won the championship.

== Regular season ==
	Club	GP	W	T	L	GF–GA	Pts
1.	Tigrene	14	11	2	1	96:31	24
2.	Allianseidrettslaget Skeid	14	11	1	2	65:29	23
3.	Gamlebyen	14	10	1	3	99:33	21
4.	Vålerenga Ishockey	14	7	0	7	54:77	14
5.	Sinsen	14	6	1	7	54:64	13
6.	Høvik	14	4	1	9	33:61	9
7.	Hasle	14	3	1	10	45:77	7
8.	Ski- og Ballklubben Drafn	14	0	1	13	27:101	1
