= 1950–51 Norwegian 1. Divisjon season =

Sports season

The 1950–51 Norwegian 1. Divisjon season was the 12th season of ice hockey in Norway. Eight teams participated in the league, and Furuset IF won the championship.

== Regular season ==
| | Club | GP | W | T | L | GF–GA | Pts |
|---|---|---|---|---|---|---|---|
| 1. | Furuset IF | 7 | 6 | 1 | 0 | 40:20 | 13 |
| 2. | Mode | 7 | 5 | 2 | 0 | 32:14 | 9 |
| 3. | Gamlebyen | 7 | 4 | 1 | 2 | 39:25 | 9 |
| 4. | Templar | 7 | 3 | 1 | 3 | 36:28 | 7 |
| 5. | Allianseidrettslaget Skeid | 7 | 3 | 1 | 3 | 26:21 | 7 |
| 6. | Stabæk IF | 7 | 1 | 2 | 4 | 19:42 | 4 |
| 7. | Sportsklubben Strong | 7 | 1 | 1 | 5 | 18:32 | 3 |
| 8. | Gjøa Ishockey | 7 | 0 | 1 | 6 | 22:50 | 1 |
