= 1963–64 Norwegian 1. Divisjon season =

Sports season

The 1963–64 Norwegian 1. Divisjon season was the 25th season of ice hockey in Norway. Eight teams participated in the league, and Gamlebyen won the championship.

== First round ==
| | Club | GP | W | T | L | GF–GA | Pts |
|---|---|---|---|---|---|---|---|
| 1. | Vålerenga Ishockey | 7 | 6 | 0 | 1 | 36:15 | 12 |
| 2. | Gamlebyen | 7 | 6 | 0 | 1 | 29:12 | 12 |
| 3. | Allianseidrettslaget Skeid | 7 | 5 | 0 | 2 | 38:22 | 10 |
| 4. | Furuset IF | 7 | 4 | 1 | 2 | 39:26 | 9 |
| 5. | Tigrene | 7 | 2 | 1 | 4 | 35:36 | 5 |
| 6. | Rosenhoff IL | 7 | 2 | 1 | 4 | 22:29 | 5 |
| 7. | SK Frigg | 7 | 1 | 0 | 6 | 19:45 | 2 |
| 8. | Hasle-Løren Idrettslag | 7 | 9 | 1 | 6 | 9:42 | 1 |

== Second round ==
=== Final round ===
| | Club | GP | W | T | L | GF–GA | Pts |
|---|---|---|---|---|---|---|---|
| 1. | Vålerenga Ishockey | 9 | 6 | 0 | 3 | 29:16 | 12 |
| 2. | Gamlebyen | 9 | 6 | 0 | 3 | 36:25 | 12 |
| 3. | Allianseidrettslaget Skeid | 9 | 6 | 0 | 3 | 39:31 | 12 |
| 4. | Furuset IF | 9 | 0 | 0 | 9 | 20:52 | 0 |

==== Championship tiebreaker ====
| | Club | GP | W | T | L | GF–GA | Pts |
|---|---|---|---|---|---|---|---|
| 1. | Vålerenga Ishockey | 2 | 2 | 0 | 0 | 6:4 | 4 |
| 2. | Gamlebyen | 2 | 1 | 0 | 1 | 9:5 | 2 |
| 3. | Allianseidrettslaget Skeid | 2 | 0 | 0 | 2 | 4:10 | 0 |

=== Relegation round ===
| | Club | GP | W | T | L | GF–GA | Pts |
|---|---|---|---|---|---|---|---|
| 5. | Tigrene | 6 | 4 | 0 | 2 | 35:17 | 8 |
| 6. | Hasle-Løren Idrettslag | 6 | 3 | 0 | 3 | 22:20 | 6 |
| 7. | Rosenhoff IL | 6 | 3 | 0 | 3 | 23:21 | 6 |
| 8. | SK Frigg | 6 | 2 | 0 | 4 | 16:38 | 4 |

==== 6th place ====
- Rosenhoff IL - Hasle-Løren Idrettslag 4:7
