= 1968–69 Norwegian 1. Divisjon season =

Sports season

The 1968–69 Norwegian 1. Divisjon season was the 30th season of ice hockey in Norway. Eight teams participated in the league, and Valerenga Ishockey won the championship.

== Regular season ==
	Club	GP	W	T	L	GF–GA	Pts
1.	Vålerenga Ishockey	14	13	0	1	104:35	26
2.	Tigrene	14	10	0	4	78:48	20
3.	Gamlebyen	14	8	1	5	68:43	17
4.	Hasle-Løren Idrettslag	14	7	1	6	70:68	15
5.	Kampørn	14	6	1	7	81:75	13
6.	Jar IL	14	6	1	7	60:62	13
7.	Isbjørnene	14	2	0	12	53:91	4
8.	Rosenhoff IL	14	2	0	12	35:122	4
