= 1955–56 Norwegian 1. Divisjon season =

Sports season

The 1955–56 Norwegian 1. Divisjon season was the 17th season of ice hockey in Norway. Eight teams participated in the league, and Gamlebyen won the championship.

== Regular season ==
	Club	GP	W	T	L	GF–GA	Pts
1.	Gamlebyen	14	13	1	0	88:16	27
2.	Tigrene	14	11	1	2	91:28	23
3.	Allianseidrettslaget Skeid	14	9	1	4	59:38	19
4.	Hasle	14	7	2	5	45:44	16
5.	Vålerenga Ishockey	14	3	2	9	38:62	8
6.	SBK Drafn	14	4	0	10	23:59	8
7.	Løren	14	2	2	10	27:88	6
8.	Furuset IF	14	2	1	11	42:78	5
