= 1967–68 Norwegian 1. Divisjon season =

Sports season

The 1967–68 Norwegian 1. Divisjon season was the 29th season of ice hockey in Norway. Eight teams participated in the league, and Valerenga Ishockey won the championship.

== First round ==
	Club	GP	W	T	L	GF–GA	Pts
1.	Vålerenga Ishockey	14	13	1	0	144:33	27
2.	Gamlebyen	14	9	1	4	73:43	19
3.	Jar IL	14	8	1	5	52:64	17
4.	Tigrene	14	7	1	6	60:51	15
5.	Isbjørnene	14	7	0	7	61:72	14
6.	Rosenhoff IL	14	4	0	10	54:95	8
7.	Grüner IL	14	3	0	11	20:50	6
8.	Sparta Sarpsborg	14	3	0	11	29:85	6

== Final round ==
	Club	GP	W	T	L	GF–GA	Pts
1.	Vålerenga Ishockey	6	5	0	1	49:22	10
2.	Gamlebyen	6	4	0	2	37:21	8
3.	Tigrene	6	3	0	3	29:37	6
4.	Jar IL	6	0	0	6	13:48	0
