= 1964–65 Norwegian 1. Divisjon season =

Sports season

The 1964–65 Norwegian 1. Divisjon season was the 26th season of ice hockey in Norway. Six teams participated in the league, and Valerenga Ishockey won the championship.

== Regular season ==
	Club	GP	W	T	L	GF–GA	Pts
1.	Vålerenga Ishockey	10	8	1	1	57:19	17
2.	Gamlebyen	10	6	2	2	53:18	14
3.	Allianseidrettslaget Skeid	10	6	1	3	53:34	13
4.	Tigrene	10	3	3	4	34:33	9
5.	Hasle-Løren Idrettslag	10	2	3	5	28:46	7
6.	Furuset IF	10	0	0	10	8:83	0
