= 1938–39 Hovedserien season =

Sports season

The 1938–39 Hovedserien season was the fifth season of ice hockey in Norway. Eight teams participated in the league, and Grane won the championship.

== First round ==
=== West Group ===
	Club	GP	W	T	L	GF–GA	Pts
1.	Grane	6	6	0	0	14:2	12
2.	Holmen Hockey	6	3	0	3	6:5	6
3.	B.14	6	3	0	3	5:7	6
4.	Ski- og Fotballklubben Trygg	6	0	0	6	3:14	0

=== East Group ===
	Club	GP	W	T	L	GF–GA	Pts
1.	Hasle-Løren Idrettslag	6	3	3	0	8:0	9
2.	Furuset Ishockey	6	2	2	2	8:9	6
3.	Sportsklubben Strong	6	1	3	2	8:8	5
4.	Sportsklubben Forward	6	0	4	2	4:11	4

== Final ==
- Grane - Hasle-Løren Idrettslag 1:0
