= 1975–76 Norwegian 1. Divisjon season =

Norwegian ice hockey league season

The 1975–76 Norwegian 1. Divisjon season was the 37th season of ice hockey in Norway. Ten teams participated in the league, and Hasle-Loren Idrettslag won the championship.

== Final round ==
	Club	GP	W	T	L	GF–GA	Pts
1.	Frisk Asker	18	14	1	3	114:54	29
2.	Manglerud Star Ishockey	18	13	1	4	102:53	27
3.	Hasle-Løren Idrettslag	18	13	1	4	133:66	27
4.	Vålerenga Ishockey	18	10	4	4	123:71	24
5.	Furuset IF	18	8	1	9	85:105	17
6.	Jar IL	18	8	1	9	73:97	17
7.	Stjernen	18	7	2	9	73:82	16
8.	Allianseidrettslaget Skeid	18	5	3	10	53:86	13
9.	Sparta Sarpsborg	18	3	1	14	53:110	7
10.	Forward Flyers	18	1	1	16	62:144	3

Source: Elite Prospects

== Second round ==
=== Final round ===
	Club	GP	W	T	L	GF–GA	Pts
1.	Hasle-Løren Idrettslag	10	9	0	1	78:42	18
2.	Vålerenga Ishockey	10	6	0	4	55:46	12
3.	Manglerud Star Ishockey	10	5	1	4	46:30	11
4.	Frisk Asker	10	4	2	4	47:38	10
5.	Furuset IF	10	2	1	7	38:68	5
6.	Jar IL	10	1	2	7	39:79	4

Source: Elite Prospects

=== Relegation round ===
	Club	GP	W	T	L	GF–GA	Pts
7.	Stjernen	6	5	0	1	38:17	10
8.	Allianseidrettslaget Skeid	6	4	1	1	44:21	9
9.	Forward Flyers	6	1	1	4	23:43	3
10.	Sparta Sarpsborg	6	1	0	5	24:48	2

Source: Elite Prospects
