= 1947–48 Norwegian 1. Divisjon season =

Sports season

The 1947–48 Norwegian 1. Divisjon season was the ninth season of ice hockey in Norway. Eight teams took part in the league, with Sportsklubben Strong emerging as the champions.

== Regular season ==
	Club	GP	W	T	L	GF–GA	Pts
1.	Sportsklubben Strong	7	6	0	1	32:19	12
2.	IL Mode	7	5	1	1	47:19	11
3.	Templar	7	4	1	2	25:13	9
4.	Sportsklubben Forward	7	4	1	2	24:21	9
5.	Hasle	7	2	2	3	23:29	6
6.	Stabæk IF	7	2	1	4	21:34	5
7.	Akademisk Ballklubb	7	2	0	5	13:43	4
8.	Holmen Hockey	7	0	0	7	7:24	0
