= 1971–72 Norwegian 1. Divisjon season =

Norwegian ice hockey league season

The 1971–72 Norwegian 1. Divisjon season was the 33rd season of ice hockey in Norway. Eight teams participated in the league, and Hasle Loren Idrettslag won the championship.

== First round ==
	Club	GP	W	T	L	GF–GA	Pts
1.	Hasle-Løren Idrettslag	14	12	1	1	101:37	25
2.	Vålerenga Ishockey	14	10	2	2	78:49	22
3.	Jar IL	14	10	0	4	75:57	20
4.	Frisk Asker	14	7	1	6	52:52	15
5.	Lambertseter/Ljan	14	5	0	9	49:66	10
6.	Furuset IF	14	4	1	9	48:74	9
7.	Kampørn	14	3	1	10	49:77	7
8.	Grüner/Hugin	14	2	0	12	35:75	4

Source: Elite Prospects

== Second round ==
=== Final round ===
	Club	GP	W	T	L	GF–GA	Pts
1.	Hasle-Løren Idrettslag	6	4	1	1	36:22	9
2.	Vålerenga Ishockey	6	3	2	1	26:25	8
3.	Jar IL	6	2	0	4	18:33	4
4.	Frisk Asker	6	1	1	4	26:26	3

Source: Elite Prospects

=== Relegation round ===
	Club	GP	W	T	L	GF–GA	Pts
5.	Lambertseter/Ljan	6	4	0	2	35:29	8
6.	Kampørn	6	4	0	2	27:25	8
7.	Grüner/Hugin	6	4	0	2	27:13	8
8.	Furuset IF	6	0	0	6	15:37	0
