= 1962–63 Norwegian 1. Divisjon season =

Sports season

The 1962–63 Norwegian 1. Divisjon season was the 24th season of ice hockey in Norway. Eight teams participated in the league, and Valerenga Ishockey won the championship.

== Regular season ==
	Club	GP	W	T	L	GF–GA	Pts
1.	Vålerenga Ishockey	14	11	2	1	74:24	24
2.	Gamlebyen	14	10	1	3	75:31	21
3.	Furuset IF	14	9	1	4	65:46	19
4.	Tigrene	14	7	2	5	61:41	16
5.	Rosenhoff IL	14	6	1	7	57:58	13
6.	Allianseidrettslaget Skeid	14	5	1	8	47:58	11
7.	Kampørn	14	3	0	11	31:75	6
8.	Sinsen IF	14	1	0	13	39:116	2
