= Esbjörs =

Esbjörs is a surname. Notable people with the surname include:

- Joacim Esbjörs (born 1970) Swedish ice hockey player
- Jonas Esbjörs (born 1973), Swedish ice hockey player, son of Lars-Erik and brother of Joacim
- Lars-Erik Esbjörs (born 1949), Swedish ice hockey player and coach

== See also ==
- Esbjörn
