= 1935–36 Hovedserien season =

Sports season

The 1935–36 GET-ligaen season was the second season of ice hockey in Norway. Eight teams participated in the league, and Grane won the championship.

== Regular season ==
	Club	GP	W	T	L	GF–GA	Pts
1.	Grane	7	6	1	0	40:6	13
2.	Holmen Hockey	7	5	0	2	16:14	10
3.	Hasle-Løren Idrettslag	7	4	1	2	14:16	9
4.	Ski- og Fotballklubben Trygg	7	4	0	3	21:17	8
5.	Sportsklubben Strong	7	3	1	3	18:15	7
6.	Sportsklubben Forward	7	2	1	4	17:22	5
7	Gjøa Ishockey	7	2	0	5	8:18	4
8	Furuset Ishockey	7	0	0	7	6:32	0
