= 1974–75 Norwegian 1. Divisjon season =

Norwegian ice hockey season

The notable 1974–75 Norwegian 1. Divisjon season was the 36th season of ice hockey in Norway. Ten teams had participated in the league, and Frisk Asker won the championship.

== First round ==
	Club	GP	W	T	L	GF–GA	Pts
1.	Hasle-Løren Idrettslag	18	16	1	1	158:42	33
2.	Manglerud Star Ishockey	18	15	0	3	90:53	30
3.	Frisk Asker	18	14	0	4	103:58	28
4.	Vålerenga Ishockey	18	11	2	5	97:64	24
5.	Stjernen	18	10	1	7	65:70	21
6.	Jar IL	18	7	3	8	76:76	17
7.	Lørenskog IK	18	6	1	11	55:111	13
8.	Furuset IF	18	3	1	14	47:91	7
9.	Sparta Sarpsborg	18	3	1	14	49:99	7
10.	Grüner IL	18	0	0	18	36:112	0

Source: Elite Prospects

== Second round ==
=== Final round ===
	Club	GP	W	T	L	GF–GA	Pts
1.	Frisk Asker	10	7	0	3	51:32	14
2.	Hasle-Løren Idrettslag	10	6	0	4	62:42	12
3.	Manglerud Star Ishockey	10	5	1	4	43:38	11
4.	Jar IL	10	3	3	4	48:66	9
5.	Vålerenga Ishockey	10	3	1	6	46:47	7
6.	Stjernen	10	3	1	6	39:64	7

Source: Elite Prospects

=== Relegation round ===
	Club	GP	W	T	L	GF–GA	Pts
7.	Grüner IL	6	4	1	1	38:26	9
8.	Furuset IF	6	3	1	2	27:25	7
9.	Sparta Sarpsborg	6	3	0	3	27:27	6
10.	Lørenskog IK	6	1	0	5	25:39	2

Source: Elite Prospects
