= 1970–71 Norwegian 1. Divisjon season =

Norwegian ice hockey league season

The 1970–71 Norwegian 1. Divisjon season was the 32nd season of ice hockey in Norway. Eight teams participated in the league, and Valerenga Ishockey won the championship.

== Regular season ==
| | Club | GP | W | T | L | GF–GA | Pts |
|---|---|---|---|---|---|---|---|
| 1. | Vålerenga Ishockey | 21 | 18 | 2 | 1 | 146:59 | 38 |
| 2. | Frisk Asker | 21 | 15 | 1 | 5 | 126:67 | 31 |
| 3. | Kampørn | 21 | 12 | 1 | 8 | 111:74 | 25 |
| 4. | Jar IL | 21 | 11 | 2 | 8 | 97:91 | 24 |
| 5. | Ljan IF | 21 | 10 | 1 | 10 | 84:93 | 21 |
| 6. | Grüner/Hugin | 21 | 6 | 2 | 13 | 58:93 | 14 |
| 7. | Gamlebyen | 21 | 4 | 2 | 15 | 66:107 | 10 |
| 8. | Sinsen IL | 21 | 2 | 1 | 18 | 66:170 | 5 |
