= 1960–61 Norwegian 1. Divisjon season =

Sports season

The 1960–61 Norwegian 1. Divisjon season was the 22nd season of ice hockey in Norway. Eight teams participated in the league, and Tigrene won the championship.

== Regular season ==
	Club	GP	W	T	L	GF–GA	Pts
1.	Tigrene	14	12	0	2	64:32	24
2.	Allianseidrettslaget Skeid	14	11	0	3	82:42	22
3.	Vålerenga Ishockey	14	10	0	4	96:40	20
4.	Gamlebyen	14	8	1	5	70:39	17
5.	Furuset IF	14	5	2	7	55:77	12
6.	Rosenhoff IL	14	4	0	10	55:86	8
7.	Hasle	14	3	1	10	47:87	7
8.	Sagene	14	1	0	13	27:94	2
