= 1969–70 Norwegian 1. Divisjon season =

Sports season

The 1969–70 Norwegian 1. Divisjon season was the 31st season of ice hockey in Norway. Eight teams participated in the league, and Valerenga Ishockey won the championship.

== Regular season ==
	Club	GP	W	T	L	GF–GA	Pts
1.	Vålerenga Ishockey	21	17	1	3	109:52	35
2.	Frisk Asker	21	15	3	3	92:40	33
3.	Jar IL	21	14	0	7	104:67	28
4.	Gamlebyen	21	11	1	9	82:77	23
5.	Grüner/Hugin	21	9	1	11	66:95	19
6.	Kampørn	21	8	0	13	91:98	16
7.	Hasle-Løren Idrettslag	21	6	0	15	80:95	12
8.	Sparta Sarpsborg	21	1	0	20	39:139	2
