= Sinsenparken =

Park in Oslo, Norway

Coordinates: 59°55′59.848″N 10°47′8.2068″E

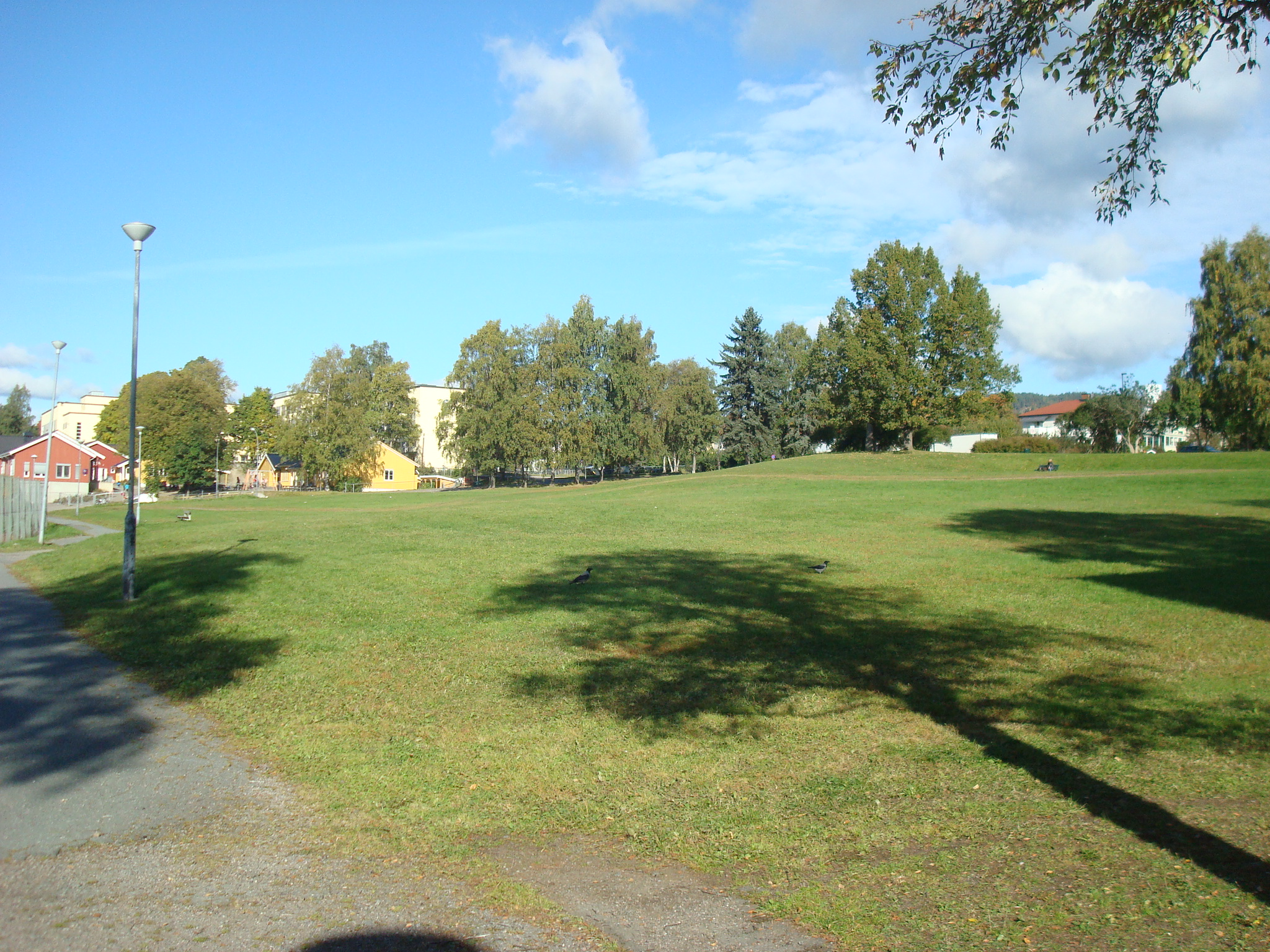
Sinsenparken

Sinsenparken is a park between Lørenveien road and the Gjøvik Line at Sinsen, in Oslo, Norway. The 21.2-acre park is used for recreational purposes. The area is bounded by 6 storey residential buildings on three sides, and has Sinsen Church framing the south. There is a leisure and recreation area for the community, which is used for exercise, dog walking, games, sunbathing, barbecuing, social gatherings and other recreation. The entire surface is covered with grass, and in the northeastern part of the park are some tall trees. In the park stands a memorial in remembrance of the 24 Sinsen residents who fell during World War II. The monument was unveiled by Alfred Seland in September 1949.
