= 1945–46 Norwegian Ice Hockey Championship season =

Sports season

The 1945–46 Norwegian Ice Hockey Championship season was the seventh season of ice hockey in Norway, first since 1940. Sportsklubben Forward won the championship.

== Results ==
There were four groups played, one in Trondheim, and three in Oslo. The winners from the group rounds qualified for the semifinals, and the semifinal winners qualified for the final.

=== Final ===
- Sportsklubben Forward - Sportsklubben Strong 3:1
