= 1979–80 Norwegian 1. Divisjon season =

Norwegian ice hockey league season

The 1979–80 Norwegian 1. Divisjon season was the 41st season of ice hockey in Norway. Ten teams participated in the league, and Furuset IF won the championship.

== Regular season ==
	Club	GP	W	T	L	GF–GA	Pts
1.	Vålerenga Ishockey	27	18	3	6	151:98	39
2.	Furuset IF	27	17	2	8	141:90	36
3.	Frisk Asker	27	17	1	9	138:83	35
4.	Manglerud Star Ishockey	27	16	3	8	133:94	35
5.	Djerv SK	27	15	3	9	102:85	33
6.	Hasle-Løren Idrettslag	27	14	3	10	140:132	31
7.	Stjernen	27	9	3	15	110:123	21
8.	Forward Flyers	27	9	2	16	124:164	20
9.	Viking IK	27	8	3	16	87:119	19
10.	Lørenskog IK	27	0	1	26	64:204	1

Source: Elite Prospects

== Playoffs ==
Semi-finals
Vålerenga Ishockey	2
Manglerud Star Ishockey	0
Furuset IF	2
Frisk Asker	0

Final
Vålerenga Ishockey	0
Furuset IF	2
Third place
Frisk Asker	2
Manglerud Star Ishockey	0
