= Oslo Package 1 =

Norwegian transport investment plan

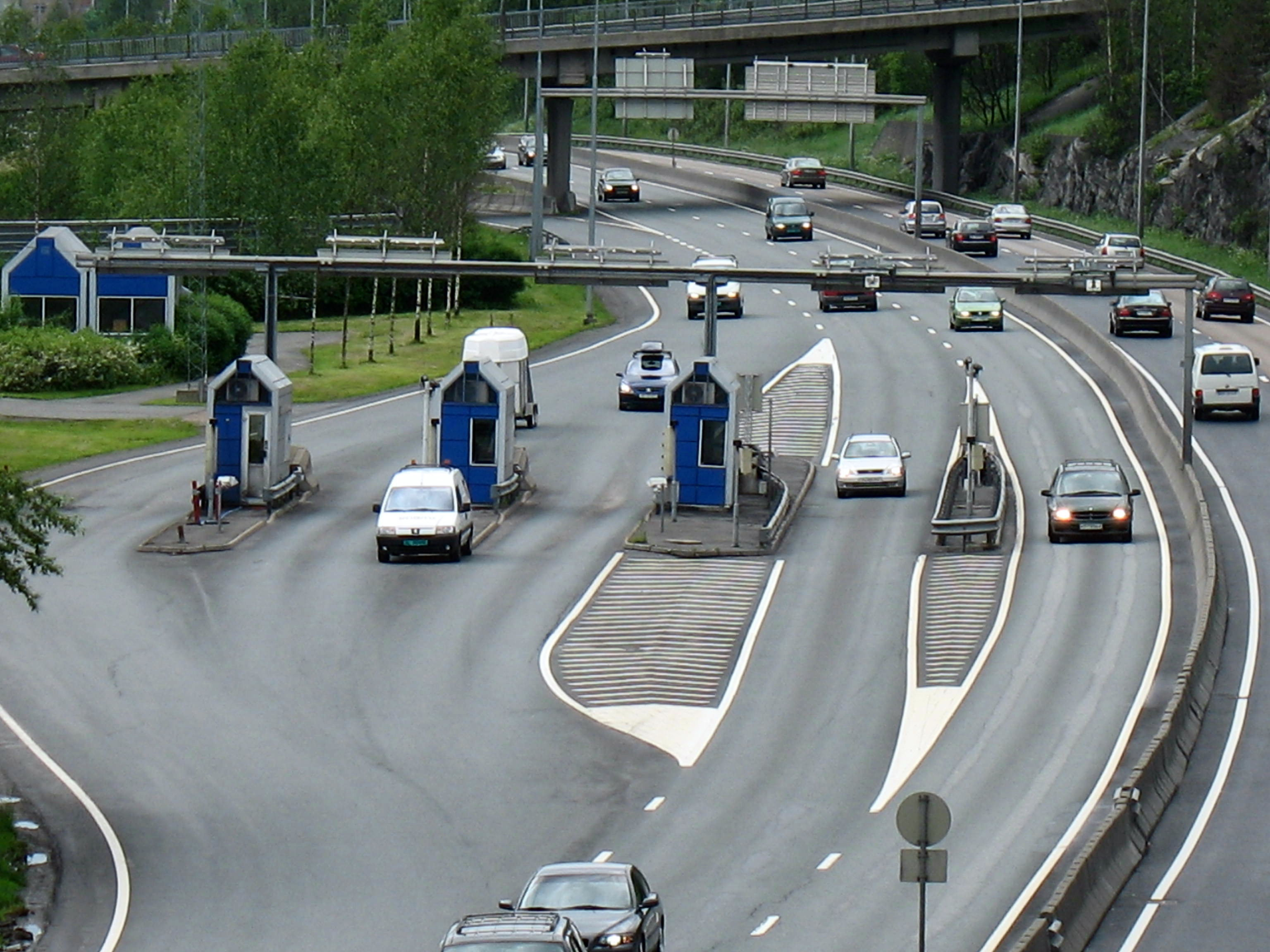
Oslo Package 1 was partially financed through road tolls, such as at Abildsø

Oslo Package 1 (Norwegian: Oslopakke 1) was a political agreement and plan for introducing an urban toll ring around Oslo, Norway and making 31 investments to road infrastructure in Oslo and Akershus. The package was approved in 1988 and toll charges were introduced in 1990. It was supplemented by Oslo Package 2, which included a similar scheme for public transport. In 2008, they were both replaced by Oslo Package 3.

The entire plan involved investments of 11 billion NOK (equivalent to 21.1 billion NOK in 2017) to be funded by 4.8 billion NOK in state grants and 6.2 billion NOK in toll road revenue. 3.9 billion NOK was invested in Akershus, while 7.1 billion NOK was invested in Oslo. The company Fjellinjen was created to manage the toll collection.

== History ==
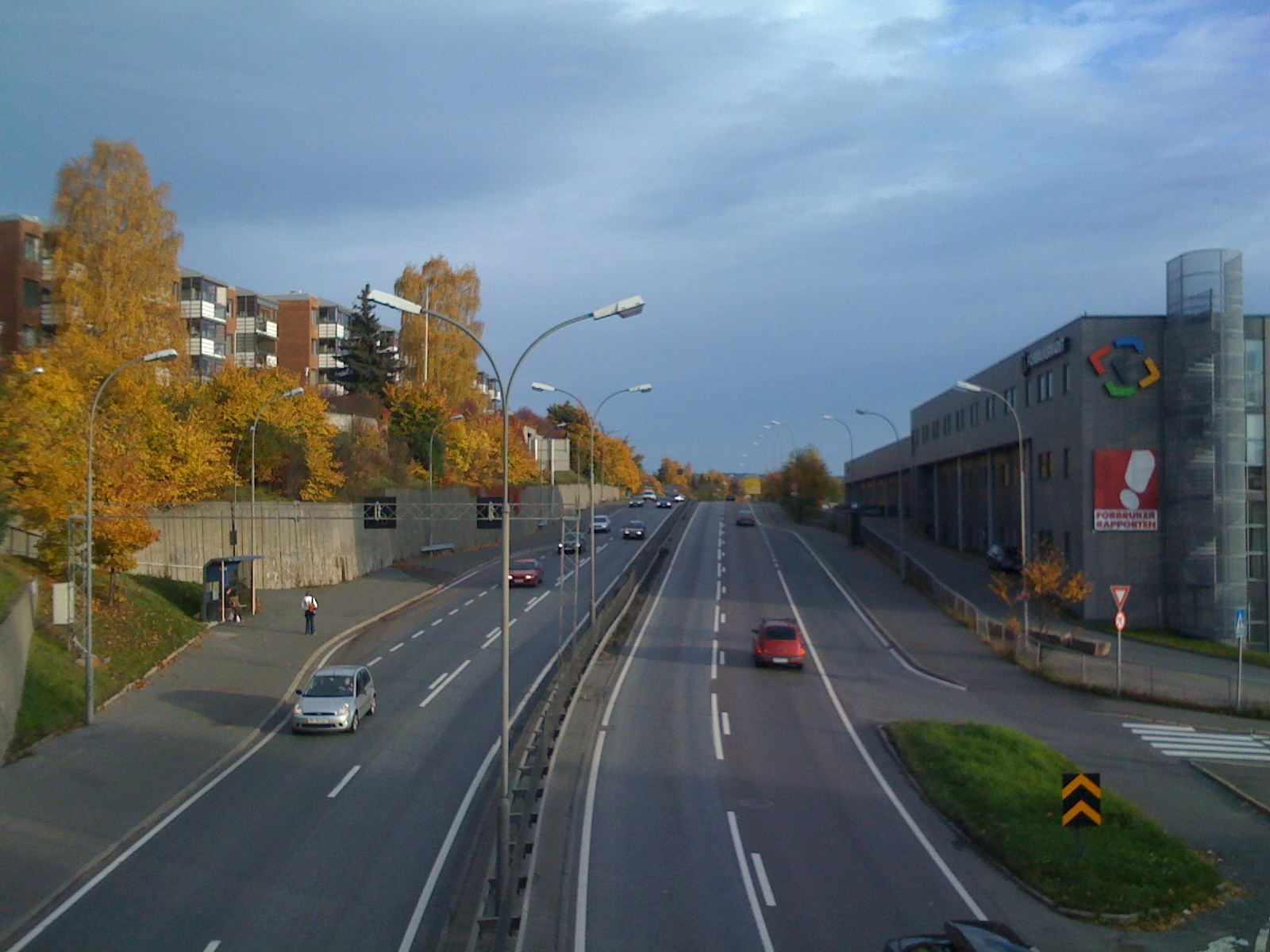
Ring 3 received much of the funding

During the 1970s, car traffic in Oslo increased greatly and there was political will to increase investment in motorways and tunnels in the city. The goal was to increase capacity and reduce congestion in city streets. In particular, Rådhusgata, the City Hall Square, and the areas around them were congested, hindering people from accessing the fjord. However, during the 1980s, the political climate shifted towards reduced public spending. In 1982, the Minister of Transport, Inger Koppernæs from the Conservative Party, promised increased government grants to local authorities that introduced toll roads.

The first project planned was the Festning Tunnel that would, along with the intersection at Vestbanen, allow the City Hall Square to become car free. In 1986, the city council in Oslo and Akershus County Council jointly set demands for a new toll ring scheme, requiring that the state grant extra funding equal to the toll charges: the "krone for krone" principle. This was similar to a prior agreement in Bergen. A report made by the second Willoch cabinet provided that initial project, Fjellinjen, was to receive an annual grant of 230 million NOK. While there was local resistance, the plan was popular in the Storting.

By 1987, Oslo and Akershus were in agreement on the placement of the eighteen toll plazas. Since the ring would be located within Oslo, there was more local resistance in Oslo than in Akershus. To increase support in Oslo, 20% of the funds were allocated for public transport and 70% of the investments would be used in Oslo. A committee with representatives from Oslo, Akershus, the state, and the Norwegian Public Roads Administration was created, while the planning became the responsibility of the Public Roads Administration. There were three plan periods from 1990 to 2001 and additional plans for the period until 2005 were also made. Estimates showed NOK 8.1 billion in investments were required from 1990 to 2001. The project was finally approved by the Storting on 10 June 1988. The goals of the project were to increase capacity by 30–50% and to avoid increased congestion by building from the city center outwards. Without the package, the investments would have taken about 30 years.

The company Fjellinjen was founded on 13 February 1986 by the Municipality of Oslo to secure financing for the Festning Tunnel. With the 1988 decision, the company was given the responsibility of financing the rest of the toll ring. As a result, Akershus bought 40% of the company in 1990.

=== Oslo Package 2 ===
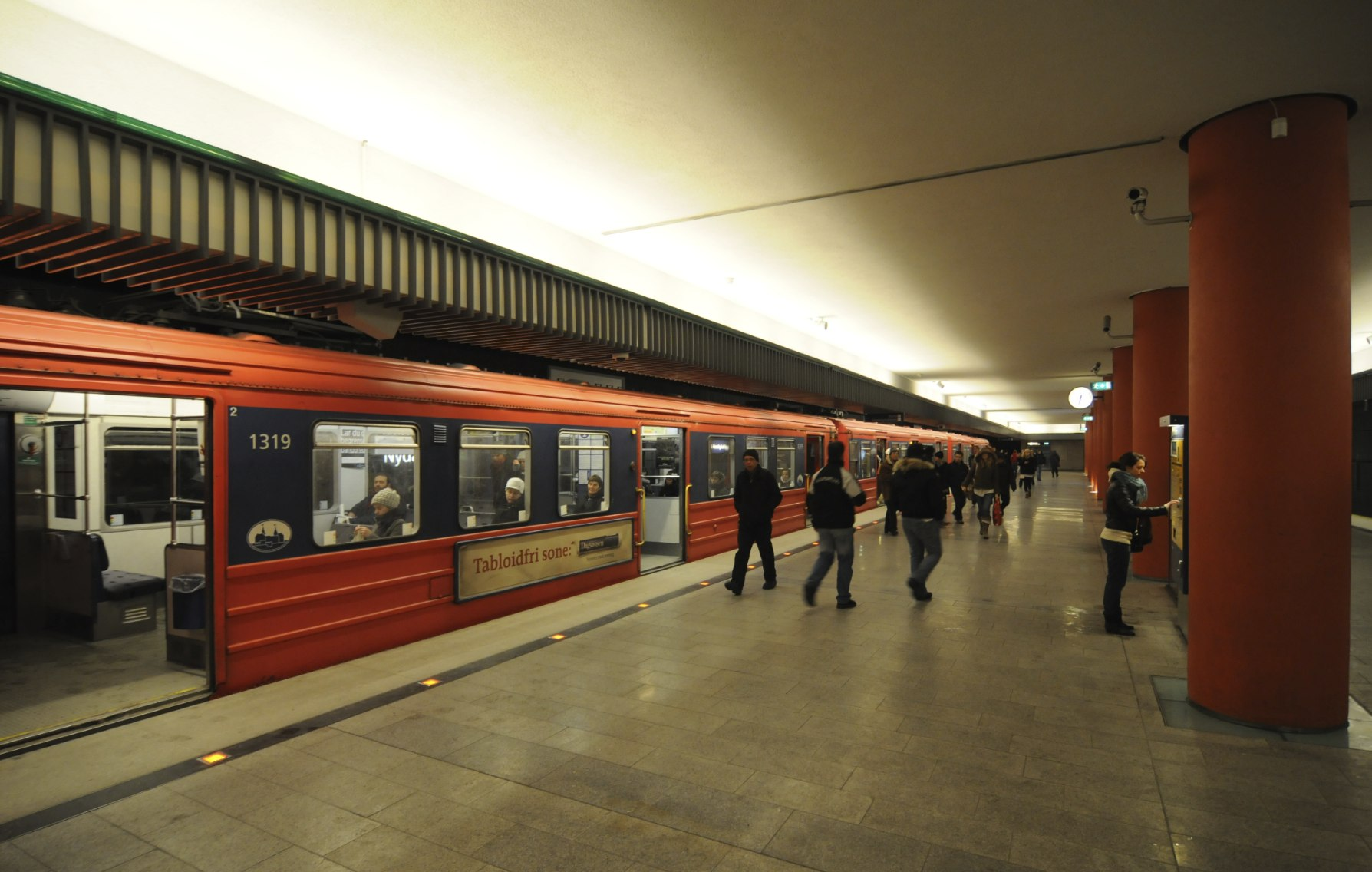
The Ring Line was one of the projects financed through the follow-up Oslo Package 2 for public transport

In 1996, the work started on the creation of a similar package for public transport – in particular, the Asker Line and Follo Line railways, the Ring Line and some extensions to the Oslo T-bane, and improvements to the infrastructure for buses and trams. The goal was to raise sufficient funding for the project, to reduce the project time from 25 years to 10 years. The package was passed by the Storting in 2000 and provided NOK 15.6 billion in funding. In addition to public grants, each public transport ticket would contribute NOK 0.75 and the tolls of the ring road would increase by 2 NOK.

=== Oslo Package 3 ===
Following the termination of Oslo Package 1 in 2008, a new political compromise was created for another twenty years of investments: Oslo Package 3. It includes investment in road, rail, and bus infrastructure as well as public transport operation. The total budget is NOK 58 billion. It was passed by parliament on 13 March 2008.

== Projects ==
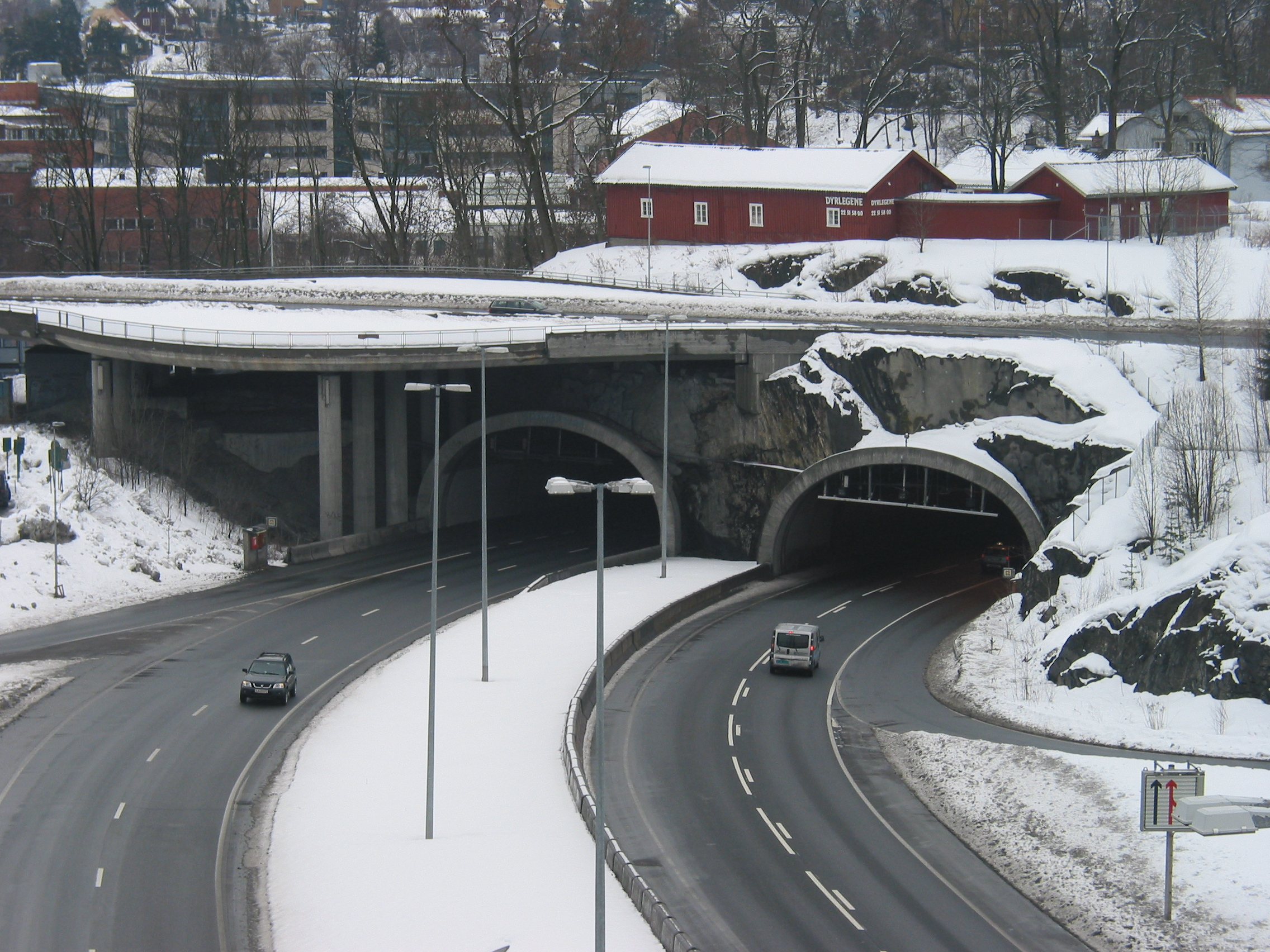
The Granfoss Tunnel was built by funds from Oslo Package 1

The main objective of the package was to move road traffic to the ring roads, reducing the amount of traffic in the city center and freeing up capacity in the main arteries. In the 1990s, a number of tunnels were built and the ring roads improved. During the 2000s, the focus was moved towards the arteries.

=== Oslo ===
European Route E18, running through the city centre, received much of the initial investments, with the Festning Tunnel opening in 1990 and the Vestbane Intersection in 1994. The City Hall Square was subsequently closed to cars. Also in the city centre were upgrades to National Road 162 in 1990–91, including the Vaterland Tunnel. A new intersection for National Road 4 was also built at Hausmannsgate.

Ring 3 received funding for the Granfoss Tunnel (1992), upgrades from Sinsen to Storo (1994), intersections at Blindern (1993) and the Norwegian Radium Hospital (1997), and upgrades to the section from Tåsen to Ullevål (including the Tåsen Tunnel, 1999). National Road 190, connecting the E6 to the E18, was also expanded, including the Teisen Intersection (with the E6 in 1990) and the Ekeberg Tunnel (1995). The E6 received grants for the Ryen Intersection (1997), the Skullerud Intersection (1998), the Svartdal Tunnel (2000), and the Galgeberg Connection (2001).

=== Akershus ===
In 1993, the E6 was upgraded between Vinterbro and Vassum while the E18 received a new intersection at Lysaker and a connection to the European Route E16 at Sandvika, including the Kjørbo Tunnel. The following year, the Bekkestua Tunnel opened on National Road 160. Norwegian National Road 4 was extended from Skøyen to Slattum in 1993 and from Gjelleråsen to Slattum in 2003. National Road 159 was upgraded between Knatten and Lørdagsrud in 1997, and from Lørdagsrud to National Road 22 the following year. A bypass was also added past Strømmen in 2003.
