= Vern Stenlund =

Canadian ice hockey player (born 1956)

- Born: April 11, 1956 (age 69); Thunder Bay, Ontario, Canada
- Height: 6 ft 1 in (185 cm)
- Weight: 176 lb (80 kg; 12 st 8 lb)
- Position: Centre
- Shot: Left
- Played for: Cleveland Barons
- NHL draft: 23rd overall, 1976; California Golden Seals
- WHA draft: 47th overall, 1976; Cleveland Crusaders
- Playing career: 1976–1978

Vern Stenlund (born April 11, 1956) is a Canadian former professional ice hockey Centre, university professor, author and coach. He played briefly in the National Hockey League for the Cleveland Barons during the 1976–77 season.

== Playing career ==
A former second-round NHL draft pick of the California Golden Seals in 1976, Stenlund played professionally with the Barons, as well as both the Salt Lake Golden Eagles and Phoenix Roadrunners of the Central Hockey League. Also a standout junior player, Stenlund enjoyed a tremendous junior career in the Ontario Hockey League with the London Knights, where he led the team in scoring with 119 points in the 1975–76 season. He retired from playing in 1981 due to injuries.

== Academic career ==
After retiring from hockey, he earned his doctorate from the University of Michigan in 1994 and went on to become an associate professor in the Faculty of Education at the University of Windsor.

In addition to his work at the University of Windsor, Stenlund helped develop the "Chevrolet Safe and Fun Hockey Program" along with former hockey star Bobby Orr. Stenlund has also written numerous books about the game, including Coaching Hockey Successfully, High-Performance Skating for Hockey, Hockey Drills for Puck Control, Hockey Drills for Passing and Receiving and Hockey Drills for Scoring. In 2001, the Ontario Hockey Association appointed Stenlund as its first "master mentor coach", to improve the quality of coaching and the player experience in junior ice hockey.

Stenlund also has worked extensively with Hockey Canada throughout his career, serving on a number of committees geared towards athlete development and education. In 2004–05, he served on three national Hockey Canada committees including the Athlete Development Committee, the Coach Mentorship Advisory Council and the Parent Education Advisory Group. In 2016, he was honoured with the Gordon Jukes Hockey Development Award, one of Hockey Canada's highest recognition for service to the game on a national level. Previously, in September 2015, he was inducted into the Northwestern Ontario Sports Hall of Fame in the Builder category.

Stenlund served as the ghost writer for hockey legend Bobby Orr's first memoir (published in 2013) titled Bobby Orr: My Story. The book was released through the Penguin Publishing Group across North America and quickly became a New York Times Best Seller, reaching #4 on the best sellers list on March 16, 2014. He also assisted former Parliamentary Budget Officer Kevin Page in writing his book titled Unaccountable: Truth and Lies on Parliament Hill which was released in 2015.

He retired in 2014 as a tenured associate professor at the University of Windsor in the Faculty of Education after a 29-year career.

== Career statistics ==
=== Regular season and playoffs ===
| | | | Regular season | | | | | Playoffs |
| Season | Team | League | GP | G | A | Pts | PIM | GP | G | A | Pts | PIM |
|---|---|---|---|---|---|---|---|---|---|---|---|---|
| 1972–73 | Chatham Maroons | SOJHL | 40 | 28 | 36 | 64 | 11 | — | — | — | — | — |
| 1973–74 | London Knights | OHA | 66 | 17 | 27 | 44 | 16 | — | — | — | — | — |
| 1974–75 | London Knights | OMJHL | 70 | 23 | 37 | 60 | 20 | — | — | — | — | — |
| 1975–76 | London Knights | OMJHL | 64 | 44 | 75 | 119 | 24 | — | — | — | — | — |
| 1976–77 | Salt Lake Golden Eagles | CHL | 67 | 13 | 17 | 30 | 10 | — | — | — | — | — |
| 1976–77 | Cleveland Barons | NHL | 4 | 0 | 0 | 0 | 0 | — | — | — | — | — |
| 1977–78 | Phoenix Roadrunners | CHL | 19 | 0 | 7 | 7 | 0 | — | — | — | — | — |
| 1980–81 | Djerv | NOR | 36 | 36 | 28 | 64 | 45 | — | — | — | — | — |
| NHL totals | | | 4 | 0 | 0 | 0 | 0 | — | — | — | — | — |
