= 1934–35 Hovedserien season =

Sports season

The 1934–35 Hovedserien season was the first season of ice hockey in Norway. Seven teams participated in the league, and Ski- og Fotballklubben Trygg won the championship.

== Regular season ==
	Club	GP	W	T	L	GF	GA	Pts
1.	Ski- og Fotballklubben Trygg	6	5	1	0	41	11	11
2.	Sportsklubben Forward	6	4	1	1	18	9	9
3.	Sportsklubben Strong	6	3	1	2	17	8	7
4.	Holmen Hockey	6	2	2	2	19	10	6
5.	Hasle-Løren Idrettslag	6	2	1	3	15	22	5
6.	Gjøa Ishockey	6	1	2	3	11	18	4
7	Furuset Ishockey	6	0	0	6	2	45	0
