= Lars-Erik Esbjörs =

Swedish ice hockey player and coach

- Born: November 11, 1949 (age 76) Avesta, Sweden
- Height: 5 ft 10 in (178 cm)
- Weight: 182 lb (83 kg; 13 st 0 lb)
- Position: Defence
- Played for: Västra Frölunda HC
- National team: Sweden
- Playing career: 1972–1984

Lars-Erik Esbjörs (born October 11, 1949 in Avesta, Sweden) is a retired Swedish professional ice hockey player and coach.

He is the father of ice hockey players Joacim and Jonas Esbjörs.

On 13 February 1975, a plane carrying members of his ice hockey team crashed on approach to Gävle–Sandviken Airport. Everyone survived the crash but Esbjörs was one of the most seriously injured; he spent several weeks at Gävle Hospital.

== Career statistics ==
			Regular season					Playoffs
Season	Team	League	GP	G	A	Pts	PIM	GP	G	A	Pts	PIM
1964–65	Säters IF	Division 4	—	—	—	—	—	—	—	—	—	—
1965–66	Säters IF	Division 3	—	—	—	—	—	—	—	—	—	—
1966–67	Hedemora SK	Division 2	—	0	—	—	—	—	—	—	—	—
1967–68	Avesta BK	Division 2	—	—	—	—	—	—	—	—	—	—
1968–69	Avesta BK	Division 2	21	3	—	—	—	—	—	—	—	—
1969–70	Avesta BK	Division 2	19	3	—	—	—	—	—	—	—	—
1970–71	Avesta BK	Division 2	18	4	—	—	—	—	—	—	—	—
1972–73	Västra Frölunda IF	Division 1	28	4	3	7	24	—	—	—	—	—
1973–74	Västra Frölunda IF	Division 1	34	4	5	9	28	—	—	—	—	—
1974–75	Västra Frölunda IF	Division 1	27	3	3	6	16	—	—	—	—	—
1975–76	Västra Frölunda IF	Elitserien	35	5	7	12	12	—	—	—	—	—
1976–77	Västra Frölunda IF	Elitserien	36	2	10	12	10	—	—	—	—	—
1977–78	Västra Frölunda IF	Elitserien	36	6	6	12	32	—	—	—	—	—
1978–79	Västra Frölunda IF	Elitserien	10	0	0	0	6	—	—	—	—	—
1979–80	Västra Frölunda IF	Elitserien	36	4	10	14	24	8	1	1	2	4
1980–81	Västra Frölunda IF	Elitserien	23	3	4	7	18	2	0	0	0	0
1981–82	Västra Frölunda IF	Elitserien	20	2	2	4	12	—	—	—	—	—
1982–83	Sparta Sarpsborg	Norway	35	18	31	49	35	—	—	—	—	—
1983–84	Sparta Sarpsborg	Norway	23	11	14	25	30	—	—	—	—	—
Elitserien totals			196	22	39	61	114	10	1	1	2	4
Division 1 totals			89	11	11	22	68	—	—	—	—	—
Norway totals			58	29	45	74	65	—	—	—	—	—
