= Sinsen Church =

- Sinsen kirke
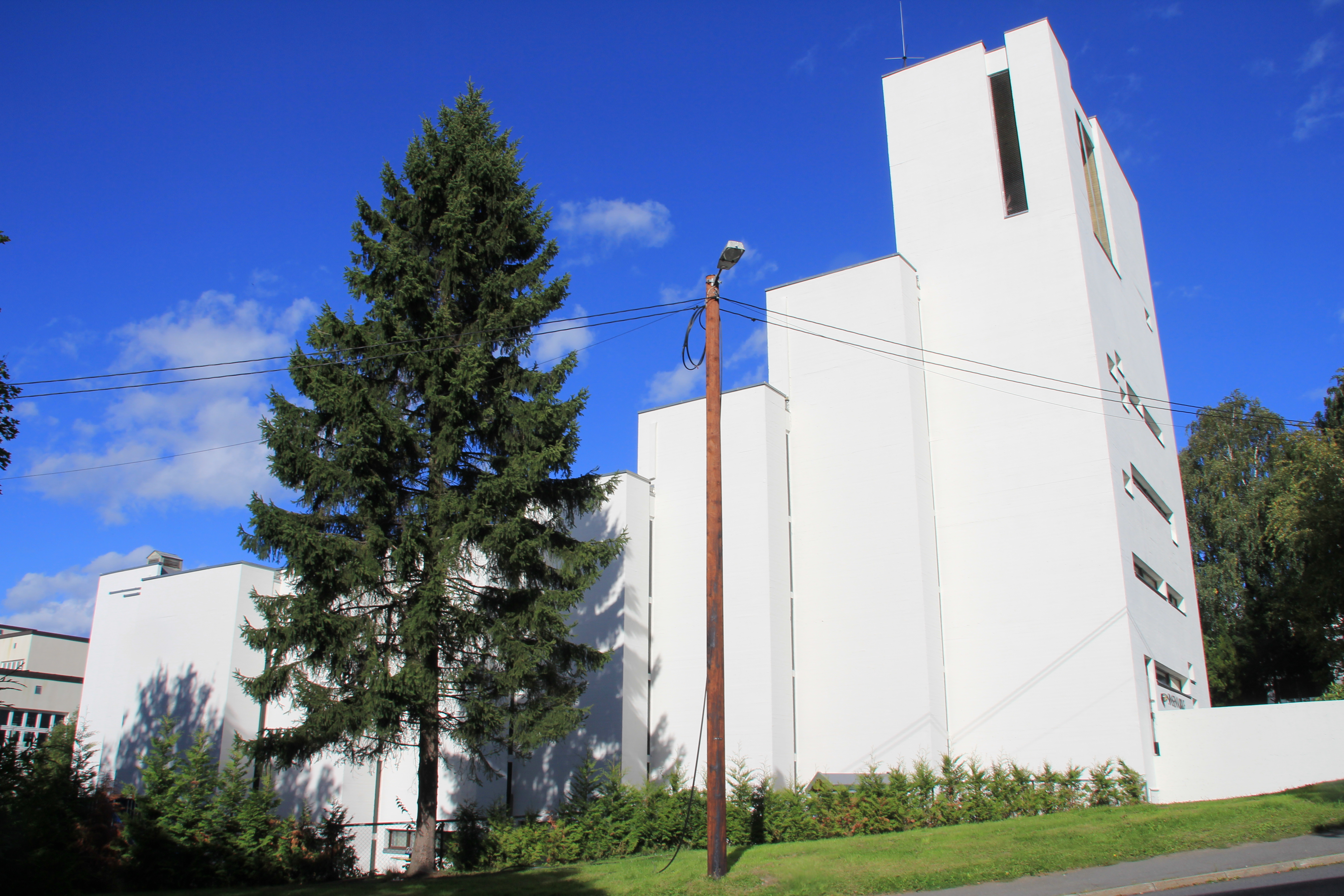

- Location within Oslo Location within Norway
- 59°55′55″N 10°47′15″E
- Location: Lørenveien 13, Sinsen; Oslo,
- Country: Norway
- Denomination: Church of Norway
- Churchmanship: Evangelical Lutheran
- Website: www.sinsenkirke.no

History
- Status: Parish church
- Consecrated: 1971

Architecture
- Functional status: Active
- Architect(s): Turid and Kristen Bernhoff Evensen

Specifications
- Capacity: 1,000
- Materials: concrete

Administration
- Diocese: Diocese of Oslo
- Deanery: Nordre Aker
- Parish: Sinsen

Sinsen Church (Norwegian: Sinsen kirke) is a church center in Oslo, Norway. The church was consecrated in 1971, and is one of the larger churches in the city.

Sinsen church is built in concrete. The tower structure of the church also houses offices and apartments. In the church room itself, there are 300 seats. This can be expanded with a parish hall, porch and sacristy to approx. 1000. The building also contains a hall, meeting rooms, various activity rooms and kitchens. There is also a kindergarten attached to the church.

The altar decoration is 4.5 meters high and carved in wood by Torvald Moseid. It depicts the crucified Christ flanked by Mary and John. The pulpit and baptismal font are both also in wood and from 1971. The altarpiece was created by Per Vigeland.

The church organ with 22 voices is created by the Brødrene Torkildsen and the three church bells by Olsen Nauen Bell Foundry.

Sinsen Church is listed by the Norwegian Directorate for Cultural Heritage.

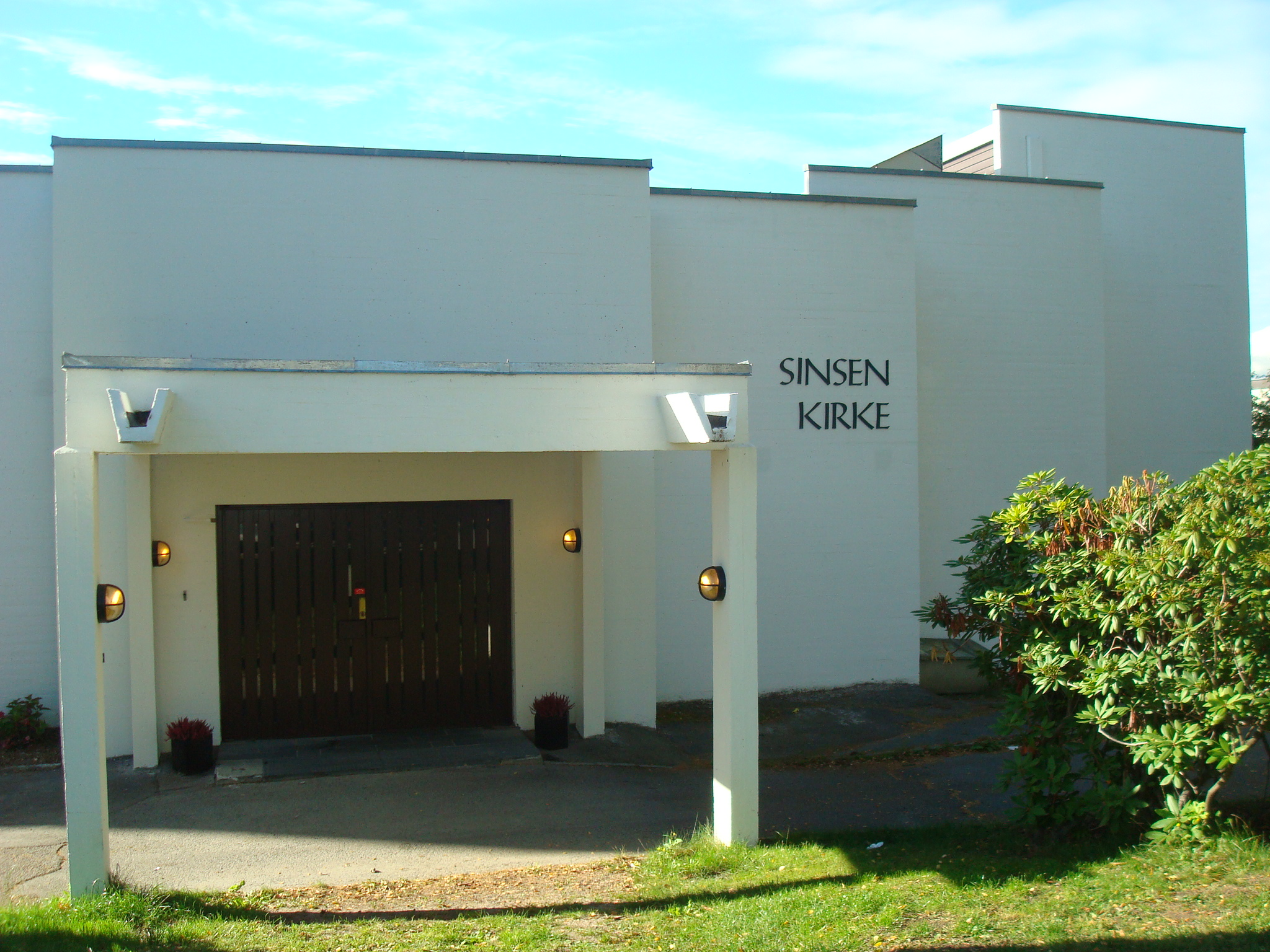
The main entrance to the church.
