= Kjørbo Tunnel =

Road tunnel in Norway

Coordinates: 59.8889°N 10.52°E

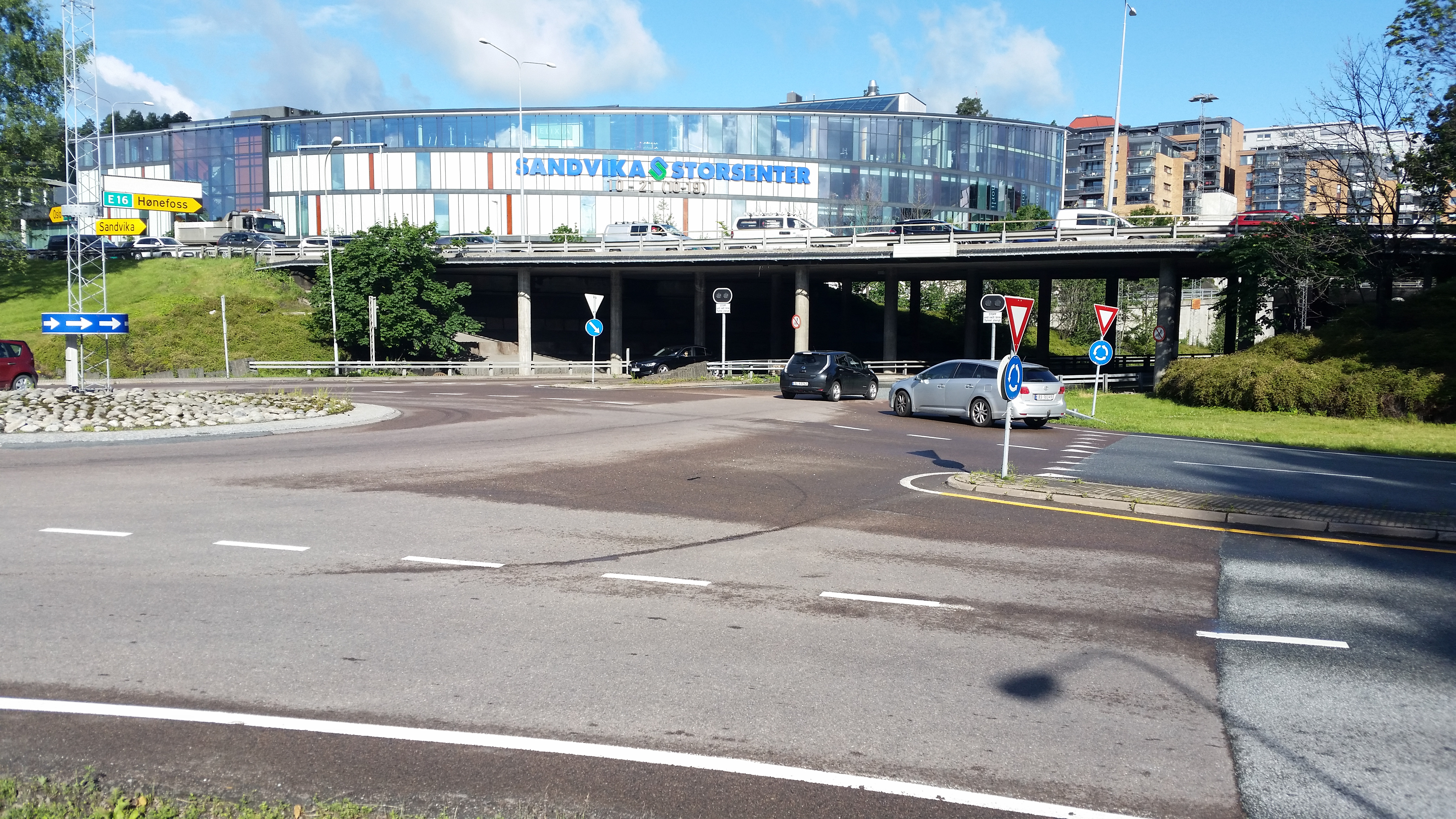
Picture of the tunnel

The Kjørbo Tunnel (Norwegian: Kjørbotunnelen) is the name of a road tunnel that runs through the hill Kjørbokollen west of Sandvika in Norway. It forms a part of the European route E16, the route branching off of the European route E18 immediately after the tunnel's southern entrance. It was opened in 1991, and was financed by Oslo Package 1.
