= Granfoss Tunnel =

Road tunnel in Oslo, Norway

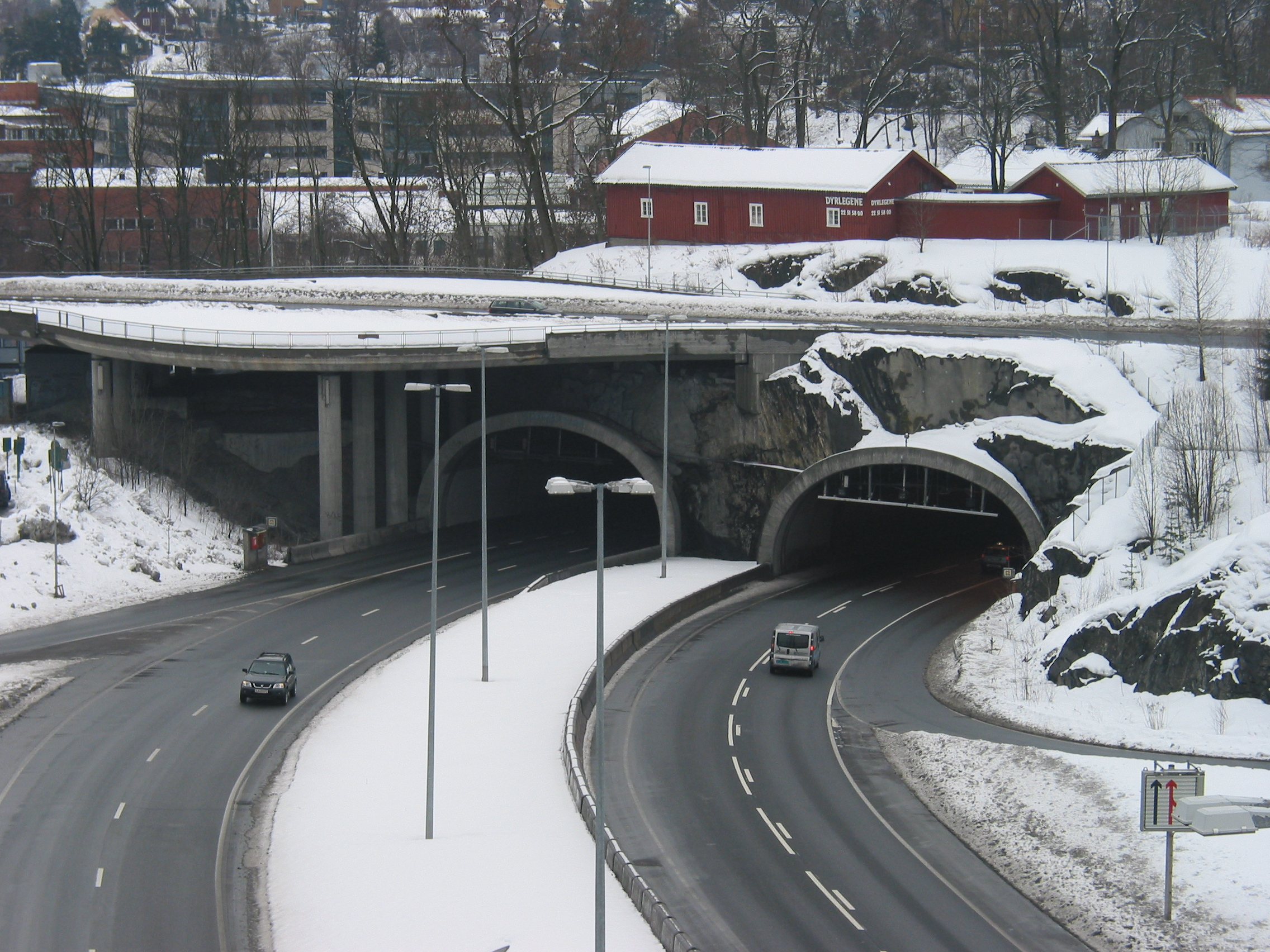
- The northern entrance of the southern tunnel, March 2009
- Interactive map of Granfoss Tunnel

Overview
- Location: Oslo, Norway
- Coordinates: 59°55′12″N 10°37′58″E
- Status: In use
- Route: E18

Operation
- Opened: 1992
- Traffic: Automotive

Technical
- Length: 2,300 metres (7,500 ft)

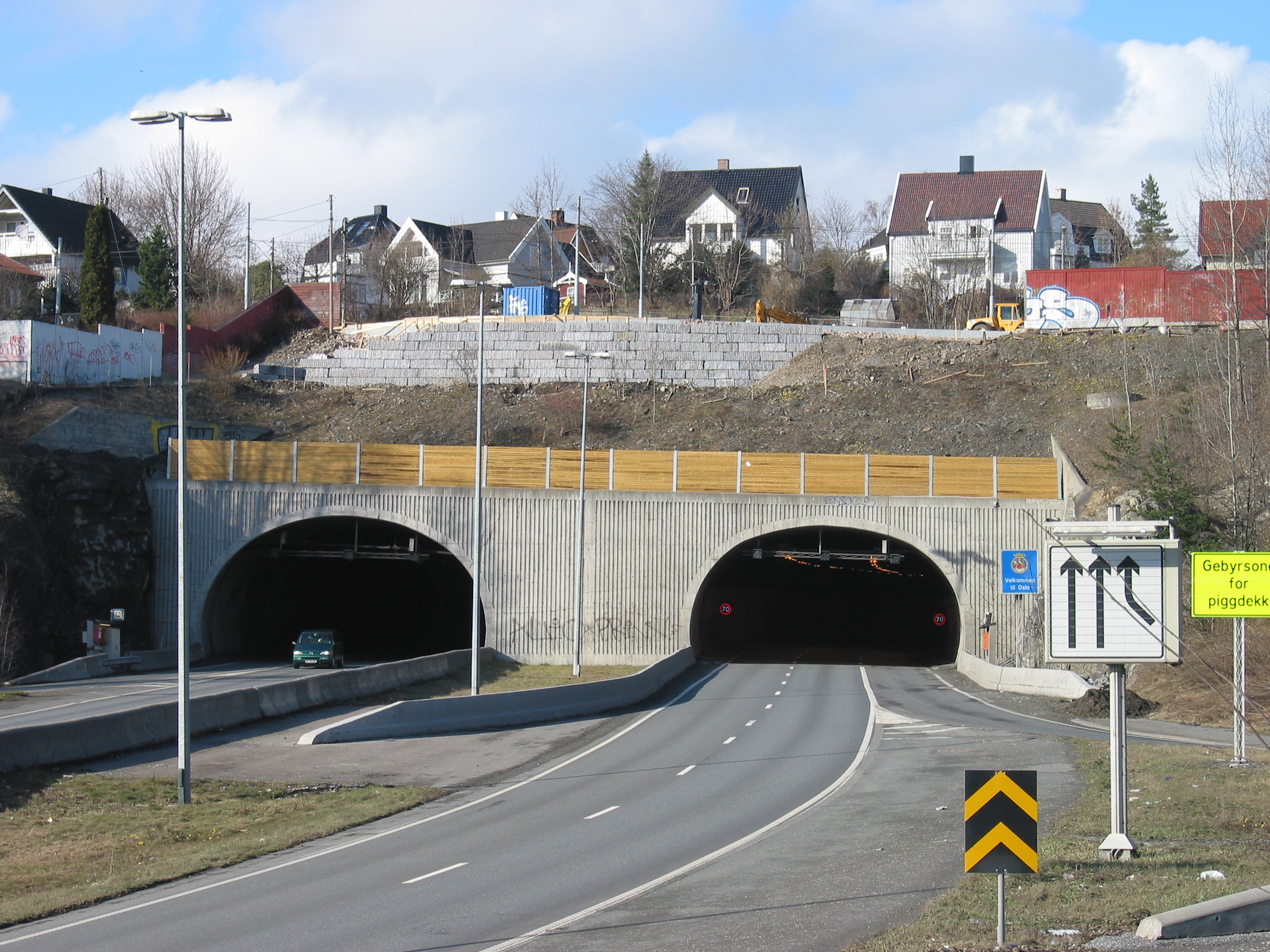
The southern entrance of the northern tunnel, April 2009.

The Granfoss Tunnel is a set of two tunnels on Ring 3 in Oslo, Norway. The two tunnels are 2.1 kilometers (1.3 mi) long and they are part of the Granfoss Line, a 2.9-kilometer (1.8 mi) stretch of motorway which was opened in 1992 connecting Ring 3 with the European route E18. The name comes from the Granfossen waterfall on the Lysakerelva river, which passes nearby. The two tunnels run from Lysaker to Mustad, and from Mustad to Ullern Church, respectively.

When the two tunnels with four lanes were opened for traffic, a bottleneck of Oslo's road system which had lingered for several decades was finally dissolved. The tunnels were financed by Oslo Package 1.

Despite there being two tunnels, the singular name is used in local parlance.
