= Per Stavem =

Norwegian shot putter and discus thrower

Personal information
- Nationality: Norwegian
- Born: March 1, 1926
- Died: September 24, 2006 (aged 80)

Sport
- Sport: Athletics
- Event(s): Shot put, discus throw
- Club: Stabæk IF

Achievements and titles
- Olympic finals: 1948 Summer Olympics; 1952 Summer Olympics

Per Stavem (1 March 1926 – 24 September 2006) was a Norwegian shot putter and discus thrower. He represented Stabæk IF.

At the 1948 Summer Olympics he competed in the decathlon and finished eleventh with 6151 points. At the 1952 Summer Olympics he finished eighth in the shot final with 16.02 metres and sixteenth in discus throw with 46.00 metres. He became Norwegian champion in shot put in 1951 and 1952.

His personal best discus throw was 47.49 metres, achieved in September 1951 in Helsinki. A year later, on the same field, he set a career best in shot put with 16.02 metres.
