= Karoline Mamelund =

Norwegian handball player (born 1987)

Personal information
- Nationality: Norwegian
- Born: 24 July 1987 (age 39) Oslo, Norway
- Height: 1.82 m (6 ft 0 in)

Sport
- Sport: Handball
- Position: Left back
- Current club: Stabæk
- Number: 3

Senior clubs
- Years: Team
- 2006-2008: Nordstrand IF
- 2008-2009: Vålerenga Håndball
- 2009-2016: Stabæk
National team
Years	Team	Apps	(Gls)
2011-2013	Norway	34	(13)
Medal record
European Championship
Silver medal – second place	2012 Serbia	Team
- Updated on 9 December 2014

Karoline Mamelund (born 24 July 1987) is a former Norwegian handball player. She last played for the club Stabæk Håndball.

== Career ==
=== Club career ===
Mamelund played for the club Vålerenga until 2006. She played for Nordstrand IF from 2006 to 2008, and for Stabæk Håndball from 2009 to 2016.

=== International career ===
She made her debut on the Norwegian national team in March 2011, and won silver with Norway at the 2012 European Women's Handball Championship. She played a total of 34 matches and scored 13 goals for the national team.

== Personal life ==
Karoline Mamelund (born Karoline Næss) was born in Oslo on 24 July 1987. She is married to Erlend Mamelund since 2015.
