= 1980–81 Norwegian 1. Divisjon season =

Norwegian ice hockey league season

The 1980–81 Norwegian 1. Divisjon season was the 42nd season of ice hockey in Norway. Ten teams participated in the league, and Stjernen won the championship.

== Regular season ==
	Club	GP	W	T	L	GF–GA	Pts
1.	Furuset IF	36	29	4	3	241:93	62
2.	Frisk Asker	36	23	6	7	182:121	52
3.	Stjernen	36	22	3	11	207:117	47
4.	Vålerenga Ishockey	36	19	3	14	154:158	41
5.	Sparta Sarpsborg	36	19	1	16	174:145	39
6.	Manglerud Star Ishockey	36	18	2	16	163:143	38
7.	Djerv SK	36	14	6	16	166:150	34
8.	Viking IK	36	10	4	22	122:216	24
9.	Hasle-Løren Idrettslag	36	8	6	22	171:195	22
10.	Lørenskog IK	36	0	1	35	92:334	1

Source: Elite Prospects

== Playoffs ==
Semi-finals
Furuset IF	0
Vålerenga Ishockey	2
Frisk Asker	1
Stjernen	2

Final
Vålerenga Ishockey	0
Stjernen	2
Third place
Furuset IF	0
Frisk Asker	1
