= Jonas Esbjörs =

Swedish ice hockey player

- Born: November 1, 1973 (age 51); Gothenburg, Sweden
- Height: 5 ft 11 in (180 cm)
- Weight: 196 lb (89 kg; 14 st 0 lb)
- Position: Winger
- Shot: Left
- Played for: Västra Frölunda HC; HV71; New York Rangers; Washington Capitals
- Playing career: 1991–2008

Eric Jonas Esbjörs (born November 1, 1973, in Gothenburg, Sweden) is a retired professional Swedish ice hockey player. He spent many years as a winger for Frölunda HC in the Elitserien.

On 5 October 2019, Frölunda HC held a ceremony for players who had played more than 500 games for the club. One of them was Jonas Esbjörs.

He is the son of ice hockey player Lars-Erik Esbjörs.
