= Joacim Esbjörs =

Swedish ice hockey player

- Born: July 4, 1970 (age 56) Gothenburg, Sweden
- Height: 6 ft 1 in (185 cm)
- Weight: 198 lb (90 kg; 14 st 2 lb)
- Position: Defence
- Shot: Left
- Played for: Västra Frölunda HC; Ässät; HV71
- NHL draft: 249th overall, 1992; Hartford Whalers
- Playing career: 1988–2001

Eric Joacim Esbjörs (born July 4, 1970, in Gothenburg, Sweden) is a Swedish retired professional ice hockey player.

Esbjörs spent the majority of his career for Västra Frölunda HC. Starting at junior level in 1986, he worked his way towards the senior squad, making his pro debut in 1988. In 1992, Esbjörs was drafted 249th overall by the Hartford Whalers in the 1992 NHL entry draft, but never signed a contract and remained with Frölunda. He stayed with the team until 1998 where he moved to Finland's SM-liiga with Ässät before returning to the Elitserien in 1999 with HV71. He retired in 2001.

He is the son of ice hockey player Lars-Erik Esbjörs.

== Career statistics ==
			Regular season					Playoffs
Season	Team	League	GP	G	A	Pts	PIM	GP	G	A	Pts	PIM
1988–89	Västra Frölunda HC	Division 1	5	1	2	3	2	—	—	—	—	—
1989–90	Västra Frölunda HC	SHL	23	0	4	4	23	—	—	—	—	—
1990–91	Västra Frölunda HC	SHL	22	1	5	6	16	—	—	—	—	—
1990–91	Västra Frölunda HC	Division 1	14	4	3	7	12	10	2	0	2	22
1991–92	Västra Frölunda HC	SHL	40	9	9	18	22	3	1	0	1	2
1992–93	Västra Frölunda HC	SHL	20	1	6	7	22	—	—	—	—	—
1992–93	Västra Frölunda HC	Division 1	15	3	3	6	34	3	0	3	3	4
1993–94	Västra Frölunda HC	SHL	38	4	7	11	44	4	0	0	0	2
1994–95	Västra Frölunda HC	SHL	22	1	4	5	20	—	—	—	—	—
1994–95	Västra Frölunda HC	Division 1	14	2	10	12	14	5	0	1	1	2
1995–96	Västra Frölunda HC	SHL	38	3	4	7	49	13	2	0	2	8
1996–97	Västra Frölunda HC	SHL	48	5	9	14	34	3	0	0	0	2
1997–98	Västra Frölunda HC	SHL	45	4	4	8	46	6	1	0	1	14
1998–99	Ässät	Liiga	52	0	6	6	42	—	—	—	—	—
1999–00	HV71 Blue Bulls	SHL	46	6	7	13	39	6	0	0	0	14
2000–01	HV71 Blue Bulls	SHL	40	2	3	5	36	—	—	—	—	—
SHL totals			382	36	62	98	351	35	4	0	4	42
