= 1982–83 Norwegian 1. Divisjon season =

Norwegian ice hockey league season

The 1982–83 Norwegian 1. Divisjon season was the 44th season of ice hockey in Norway. 10 teams participated in the league, and Furuset IF won the championship.

== Regular season ==
| | Club | GP | W | T | L | GF–GA | Pts |
|---|---|---|---|---|---|---|---|
| 1. | Furuset IF | 36 | 24 | 1 | 11 | 224:126 | 49 |
| 2. | Sparta Sarpsborg | 36 | 23 | 2 | 11 | 193:121 | 48 |
| 3. | Vålerenga Ishockey | 36 | 22 | 0 | 14 | 201:157 | 44 |
| 4. | SK Djerv | 36 | 21 | 1 | 14 | 210:151 | 43 |
| 5. | Frisk Asker | 36 | 20 | 3 | 13 | 175:130 | 43 |
| 6. | Manglerud Star Ishockey | 36 | 21 | 0 | 15 | 193:184 | 42 |
| 7. | Viking IK | 36 | 14 | 6 | 16 | 158:143 | 34 |
| 8. | Stjernen | 36 | 13 | 3 | 20 | 152:174 | 29 |
| 9. | Storhamar Ishockey | 36 | 12 | 2 | 22 | 165:240 | 26 |
| 10. | Hasle-Løren Idrettslag | 36 | 0 | 2 | 34 | 119:364 | 2 |

Source: Elite Prospects

== Playoffs ==
Semi-finals
Furuset IF | 2
Vålerenga Ishockey | 0
Sparta Sarpsborg | 2
SK Djerv | 0

Final
Furuset IF | 2
Sparta Sarpsborg | 0
Third place
Vålerenga Ishockey | 2
Djerv | 0

== Relegation ==
- Rosenborg IHK - Storhamar Dragons 0:2 (2:8, 2:4)
