= Sinsen =

Neighborhood in Oslo, Norway

Coordinates: 59°56′N 10°47′E

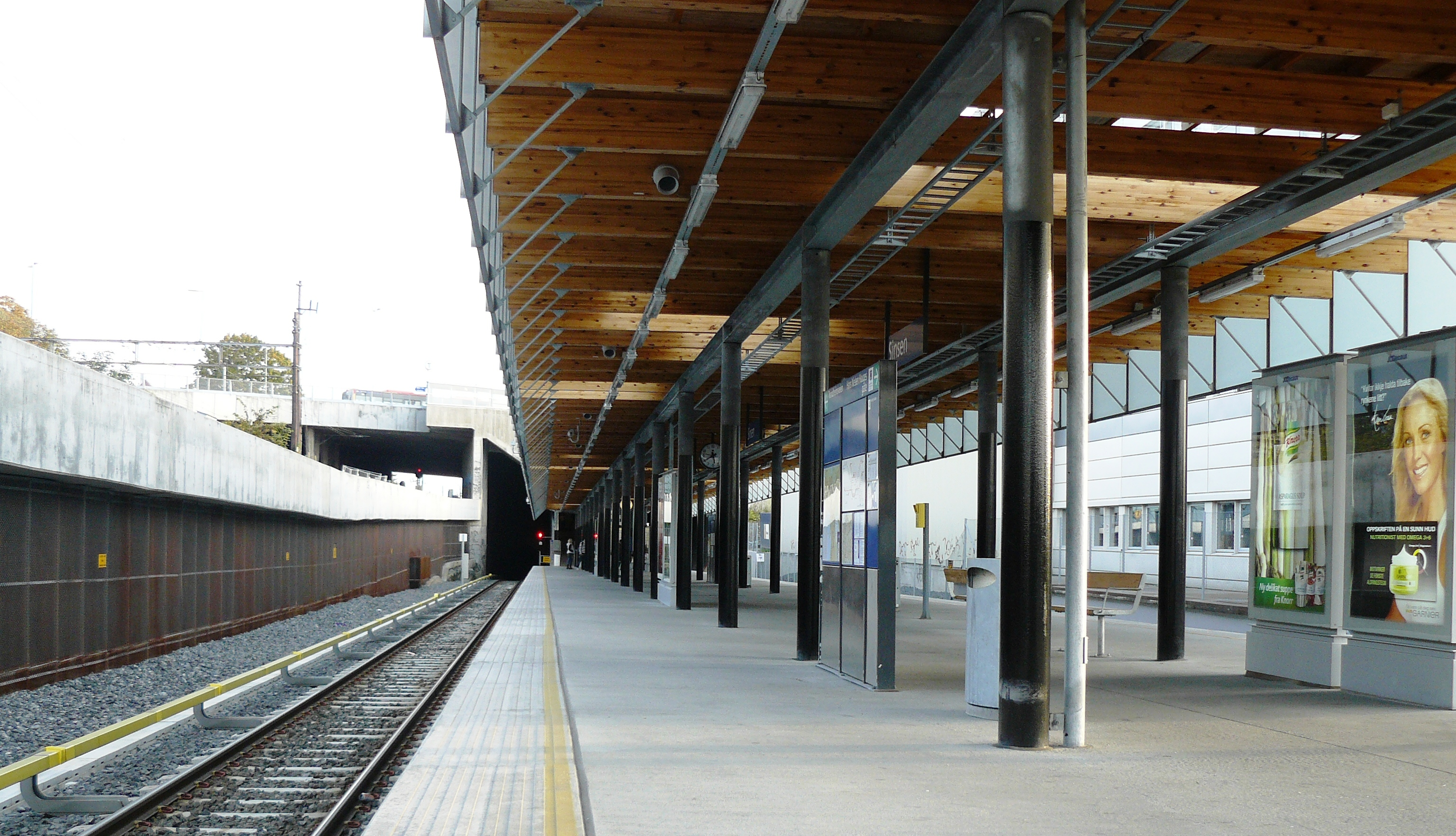
Sinsen Station on the T-bane

Sinsen is a mixed residential and commercial area in Grünerløkka borough of Oslo, Norway. The westernmost part of Sinsen is part of the borough Nordre Aker.

The Sinsen Interchange, located on the border between the boroughs of Nordre Aker, Grünerløkka and Bjerke, was the first roundabout in Norway. It has since developed into a multi-lever intersection, with both Ring 3, National Road 4 and the Sinsen Line of the Oslo Tramway routes around. "North of the Sinsen Interchange" is common expression in the Norwegian district debates, where inhabitants of Oslo are accused of being ignorant of the country north of the interchange. The expression cropped up in revues during the 1960s, and is probably due to that Sinsen then was the end point for the main road leading into Oslo from the north.

The area is served by the Sinsen Line of the Oslo Tramway. The Oslo T-bane serves the neighborhood at Sinsen Station, while the Gjøvik Line serves the area at Grefsen Station.

== The name ==
The neighbourhood is named after the old farm Sinsen (Norse Sinnsin, from *Sinnsvin). The first element is the genitive of sinn meaning "road", and the last element is vin meaning "meadow". The area was an important crossroads also in old times, where the road from the bottom of Oslofjord ramified into the road east to Romerike and north to Maridalen/Hadeland.
