= SK Strong =

Former Norwegian sports club

Sportsklubben Strong
- Founded: 1 May 1915
- Dissolved: 1952
- Based in: Oslo
- Stadium: Dælenenga idrettspark (bandy, ice hockey, football)

Sportsklubben Strong was a sports club in Oslo, Norway, which was primarily known for its ice hockey section, but also consisted of bandy and football departments.

== History ==
The club was founded on 1 May 1915. The ice hockey section was one of the founding members of the Hovedserien in the 1934–35 season. On 30 October 1940, the club merged with neighbours Dæhlenengen SBK, and the new name of the club was Sportsklubben Trym. Due to the German occupation of Norway, there was no activity in the new club before the end of World War II in 1945. It was then decided that the club was taking back the name Strong. Their greatest achievement was winning the 1. divisjon championship in the 1947–48 season. In 1952, SK Strong merged with Ball- og Skiklubben av 1914 and SK Spero to form Grüner IL.

== Ice hockey ==
SK Strong
- City: Oslo, Norway
- Founded: 1915

Franchise history
- 1915–1952: SK Strong

The ice hockey section at Strong was one of the founding members of the Hovedserien in the 1934–35 season. The team won the 1. divisjon championship in the 1947–48 season.

=== Achievements ===
- Norwegian champion (1): 1947–48.

== Football ==
SK Strong's football department played in the Norgesserien (top division) in 1937–38, 1938–39, 1939–40 and 1947–48. Thorleif Hartung and Lars Martinsen represented Norway while playing for Strong.
