= Jar IL =

Sports club in Norway

- Full name: Jar Idrettslag
- Founded: 2 February 1934
- Ground: To 2010: Jar idrettsplass From 2011: Jar ishall Handball: Gjønneshallen

Jar Idrettslag is a Norwegian sports club from Bærum, Akershus. It mainly covers the areas Jar, Lysaker and parts of Stabekk.

Jar IL was founded on 2 February 1934 as a merger between the boys' clubs Freidig and Rapp. It had sections for bandy, association football, track and field and Nordic skiing (cross-country skiing and ski jumping). Sections were added for team handball in 1940, orienteering in the 1940s and ice hockey in the 1950s. Ice hockey was the main focus from 1954, while all other sports waned. Only handball survived.

The home field was Jar idrettsplass, colloquially named Jarbanen, which was opened on 20 August 1937. The ground had originally been given to Bærums SK in 1922 by Harald Løvenskiold. The field was owned by Jar Welfare Society from 1938 to 1946, Jar IL from 1946 to 1968 and then by Bærum Municipality.

A field was used for team sports, and nearby there were two ski jumping hills. Both hills disappeared after a time, and the use of the field was limited to handball and tennis during the summer and ice hockey during the winter. From 1965 the club coexisted with the tennis club Jar TK, which existed from 1932 to 2010. A clubroom for Jar IL was opened in 1947, and rebuilt in 1957–1958. In 1976 a similar clubroom was built for the tennis club.

An indoor facility for tennis was raised in 1979. From 1986 the ice hockey field was artificially frozen. In 2006 it was decided politically to build an indoor arena for ice sports, demolishing the current tennis fields. The new arena will be named Jar ishall. The tearing of the old facilities started in 2010.

The men's ice hockey team won promotion to the Main League, the highest league in Norway, in 1966. In the 1970s the team record a third-place finish. After relegation from the highest league, the team had a tenure at the second tier, the First Division. Their last season there was in 2003–2004. The men's team currently plays in the Third Division, the fourth tier of Norwegian ice hockey. When Jar Ishall is finished, the club will add curling and figure skating to its roster.
