= Stabæk IF =

Norwegian multi-sports club in Bærum, Oslo

- Full name: Stabæk Idrætsforening
- Founded: 16 March 1912
- Based in: Bærum
- Colours: Navy, Blue
- Website: Club home page

Stabæk Idrætsforening is a Norwegian multi-sports club in Bærum, a municipality bordering on Oslo in the west. It has sections for football, bandy, handball and alpine skiing. While the football team Stabæk Fotball is the most prominent, the men's bandy team has taken multiple national championships. The women's handball team plays in the first tier of Norwegian handball, and the men's team on the third tier. The club formerly had sections for athletics, sport shooting and orienteering. In early 2009 a new women's football team was started within Stabæk IF and was named Stabæk Fotball Kvinner, in reality a relocation of Asker Fotball's women's team.

== History ==
The club was founded on 16 March 1912, really as a continuation of the club Stabæk SFK from 1908. In 1922 it absorbed some neighboring clubs Grav IF, Haslum SK and Stabekk AK, and in 1926 it absorbed Stabekk BK, which had rejected a merger in 1922. It still had a local competitor in the workers' club Stabekk AIL, which was organized in Arbeidernes Idrettsforbund. Around 1930 the shooting section broke out of Stabæk IF and founded its own club. During the Second World War, Stabæk IF was disbanded by Axel Heiberg Stang and Egil Reichborn-Kjennerud on 21 June 1941. So as to avoid forced nazification by the Quisling regime, an action taken by most Norwegian sports clubs. Reichborn-Kjennerud even lived at Skallum farm, near an old ice rink used by Stabæk. The club was re-founded after the war's end. The next section to become defunct was the athletics section, which was dissolved in 1985. Stabæk had a number of nationally competitive athletes, including Per Stavem, Svein Inge Valvik, Thor Tangen, Leif Uggen, Rolf Arveland, Rolf Kluge and Sturla Kaasa, and also Arve Opsahl. The orienteering section later went defunct.

== Localization ==
Its name is taken from the area Stabekk, and the club headquarters are located at Ringstabekk, but the club activities except bandy and skiing have been centered on Nadderud and Bekkestua the recent years. In 1990 the club presented grandiose plans: at Nadderud, the grass pitch Bekkestuabanen would be an ice arena with a grandstand and adjoining buildings. A field north of Bekkestuabanen would become an underheated gravel pitch for football. A new indoor arena would be built near Nadderudhallen; the road which leads to Nadderudhallen would in that case disappear. The new clubrooms would be in the lower secondary school Bekkestua, which Stabæk suggested to abolish. The club also proposed to turn the upper secondary school Nadderud into a conference center for elite sports. Stabæk would in such a scenario leave the headquarters at Ringstabekk behind, swapping it with the municipality for help with the grandiose plans. Not one of the suggestions materialized. In 2009 the football section relocated somewhat as they inaugurated the new stadium Telenor Arena.

== Bandy ==
- Norwegian champion: 1952, 1953, 1955, 1977, 1987, 1989, 1993, 1994, 1995, 1996, 1997, 1999, 2000, 2001, 2002, 2006, 2007, 2008, 2009 og 2011.
- Premier league wins: 1992, 1993, 1995, 1996, 1997, 1998, 1999, 2000, 2001, 2002, 2005, 2006, 2011.

== Football ==
=== Men ===
- Norwegian cup champion in football 1998.
- League champion in football 2008.

=== Women ===
- Norwegian champion in football 2011, 2012 and 2013.
- League champion in football 2010 and 2013.

== Handball ==
- Norwegian champion in women's handball 1971.
- Norwegian champion in men's handball 1969.
- Norwegian runner-up in women's handball cup 2011, 2012 and 2017.

=== Notable former players ===
- (Norway) Karoline Dyhre Breivang
- (Norway) Linn Jørum Sulland
- (Norway) Stine Bredal Oftedal
- (Norway) Hanna Bredal Oftedal
- (Norway) Sanna Solberg
- (Norway) Silje Solberg
- (Norway) Karoline Mamelund
- (Norway) Linn Gossé
- (Norway) Janne Tuven
- (Norway) Monica Vik Hansen
- (Norway) Jeanette Nilsen
- (Norway) Heidi Halvorsen
- (Norway) Siv Heim Sæbøe
- (Norway) Malin Holta
- (Norway) Helene Gigstad Fauske
- (Norway) Jenny Osnes Græsholt
- (Norway) Henny Reistad

== Alpine ==
- Sverre Johannessen, Norwegian champion in alpine combined and downhill 1947.
- Johan Rolf Flattum, Norwegian champion 1953.
- Dikke Eger-Bergmann, Norwegian champion in slalom skiing 1961, 1966 and 1967, giant slalom 1966 and alpine combined 1966 and 1967.
- Anne Berge, Norwegian champion in giant slalom 1983 and 1994, alpine combined 1989.
- Berit Strand, Norwegian champion in slalom 1965.
- Lasse Thue, Norwegian champion in slalom 1972.
- Fredrik Zimmer, Norwegian champion in giant slalom 1986
- Torjus Berge, Norwegian champion in slalom 1986.
- Kjersti Nilsen, Norwegian champion in slalom 1987.
- Janne Ugelstad, Norwegian champion in combined and downhill 1987.
- Jeanette Lunde, Norwegian champion in downhill 1995.
- Morten Møller, Norwegian champion in Telemark skiing 1995, 1996 and 1997.
- Lotte Smiseth Sejersted, Norwegian champion in slalom in 2011, giant slalom in 2009 and 2011, Super-G 2009 and 2011, downhill 2007, 2010 and 2011, super combined 2009, 2010 and 2011, Junior World Champion in downhill 2011.

== Athletics ==
- Per Stavem, Norwegian champion in shot put 1951 and 1952, Norwegian champion in standing long jump 1952.

== Ice hockey ==
- Norwegian champion in ice hockey 1947.
