= Grüner IL =

Norwegian alliance sports club

- Full name: Grüner Idrettslag
- Founded: 1914
- Ground: Dælenenga idrettspark, Oslo; Grünerhallen, Oslo
- League: Fourth Division
Home colours

Grüner Idrettslag is a Norwegian alliance sports club from Grünerløkka, Oslo. It has sections for association football, team handball and ice hockey, formally named Grüner Fotball IL , Grüner Håndball IL and Grüner Ishockey IL. The club colors are purple.

It was founded on 14 October 1952 as a merger of the teams Strong, B14 and Spero, but it counts 1914, founding date of B14, as its own founding date. After merging with Hugin in 1969 it held the name Grüner/Hugin, but reverted to Grüner IL in 1974. The club crest was inspired by that of Allmänna Idrottsklubben.

== Departments ==
=== Football ===
The men's football team currently plays in the Fourth Division, having had runs in the Third Division from 2002 to 2005 and from 2007 to 2012. In 2007 the team even won its group, and contested a playoff to be promoted to the Second Division. However the team was utterly thrashed by Skjetten SK, 0–14 over two legs. The home field is Dælenenga idrettspark.

=== Ice Hockey ===
The men's ice hockey team currently plays in the First Division, the second tier of Norwegian ice hockey. It contested playoffs to possibly win promotion to the highest league after the 2007–08 season and after the 2009–10 season, but did not prevail. The ice arena is named Grünerhallen. Dælenenga idrettspark was formerly used as an outdoor ice rink, hosting ice hockey at the 1952 Winter Olympics.

=== Handball ===
The club has a women's handball team, currently playing in the Fifth Division.
