= IK Tigrene =

- City: Oslo, Norway
- League: 1. divisjon

Franchise history
- Until 1969: IK Tigrene

IK Tigrene was an ice hockey team in Oslo, Norway.

== History ==
The club first participated in the 1. divisjon, the top level of Norwegian ice hockey, in the 1951-52 season. They won the league and were Norwegian champions in 1956-57 and 1960-61. The club merged with IF Frisk for the 1969-70 season.
