= Skeid =

Norwegian sports club

- Full name: Idrettsklubben Skeid (trad.)
- Founded: 1 January 1915

Skeid is a Norwegian alliance sports club from Nordre Åsen, Oslo. It has sections for association football (one for elite and one for grassroots football), Nordic skiing and bandy.

== General history ==
The club was founded as IK Skeid on 5 December 1925. It was a merger between the two clubs Kristiania BK (founded 1 January 1915 as a merger of Njord and Oslo FK) and SFK Frem (nicknamed Frem 14, founded 9 April 1914 as a merger of Bjølsen FK and footballers in Thorshaug IF). Skeid now counts 1 January 1915 as its founding date. The club colors in Kristiania BK were red and blue, which are still used, whereas the yellow and black club colors of SFK Frem are found in the logo as well as the current team jerseys in the winter sports. Former sports in the club include ice hockey and orienteering. The club does not use IK Skeid anymore, often just Skeid or Allianseidrettslaget Skeid ("Alliance Sports Team Skeid").

The home field is Nordre Åsen. The football team has also used Voldsløkka Stadion and Bislett Stadion because of stadium size requirements in higher leagues.

== Skeid Fotball ==
Skeid Fotball
Home colours	Away colours

Skeid Fotball is the name of the top-level football section. It consists of a men's senior team, a reserves team and a men's junior team. The men's team currently plays in the Norwegian Second Division, but played in the First Division as late as in 2009 and last played in the Norwegian Premier League (the top level) in 1999. In 2003 it reached the semi-final of the Norwegian Football Cup. It took over the honors of Skeid's football section when the club was organized into an alliance sports club.

== Grassroots football ==
The "grassroots football" (Norwegian: breddefotball) section of the club goes by the name Skeid. A senior men's team (bearing no relation to Skeid Fotball) was founded because of demand in the district, and currently plays in the Fourth Division, the fifth tier of Norwegian football. A reserves team plays in the eighth division. The women's team currently plays in the Second Division, the third tier.

== Bandy ==
Bandy was added as a sport in Skeid in the 1929–30 season. The men's bandy team won the Norwegian Premier League in 1988–89, and last played in the league in 1993–94, when they ended in last place.

== Other sports ==
Well-known skiers include Alf Andersen. Ice hockey player Frank Olafsen, while Skeid still offered that sport, participated in the 1964 Winter Olympics.
