= SK Forward =

Norwegian sports club

- City: Oslo, Norway
- League: 4. divisjon

Franchise history
- 1915–1948: SK Forward
- 1948–1971: Gamlebyen IF
- 1971–present: SK Forward

Sportsklubben Forward is a sports club in Oslo, Norway, which is primarily known for its ice hockey department.

== History ==
The club was founded on September 25, 1915. The ice hockey department was one of the founding members of the Hovedserien, the top level of Norwegian ice hockey, in the 1934–35 season. The team regularly participated in the highest-level ice hockey leagues until after the 1985–86 season. They won a total of eight Norwegian championships, second only to Vålerenga Ishockey, from 1946 to 1964. From 1948 to 1971, they were known as Gamlebyen IF, before becoming SK Forward again. Forward currently competes in the 4. divisjon, the fifth level of Norwegian ice hockey.

The association has also had bandy, football, and handball departments. The bandy team won the Norwegian Bandy Premier League in 1928.

== Achievements ==
=== Bandy ===
- Norwegian champion (1): 1928

=== Ice hockey ===
- Norwegian champion (8): 1946, 1950, 1953, 1955, 1956, 1958, 1959, 1964
