= Hasle-Løren IL =

Norwegian multi-sport club

Hasle-Løren Idrettslag
- City: Oslo, Norway
- League: 1. divisjon
- Founded: 1911; 115 years ago
- Home arena: Lørenhallen
- Colors: Red, navy and white
- General manager: Elia Hoelstad
- Head coach: Philippe Juell
- Affiliate: Vålerenga Ishockey (Fjordkraft-ligaen)
- Website: ishockey.hasle-loren.no

Championships
- Regular season titles: 3
- Playoff championships: 1972, 1974, 1976

Hasle-Løren IL Fotball
Home colours

Hasle-Løren Idrettslag is a Norwegian sports club from the neighborhoods Hasle and Løren in Oslo. It was founded in 1911, and has sections for association football, bandy, ice hockey, skiing, and cycling.

== Ice hockey ==
Some of its greatest success was achieved by the ice hockey team. The team plays its home games in Lørenhallen, which holds 1,000 spectators. As of 2007, it is in the 1. divisjon - the second highest Norwegian ice hockey competition.

The club has a rich history in Norwegian Ice Hockey. It was the Norway champion in 1972, 1974, 1976. It won the 1. divisjon league in the 1971/72, 1972/73 and 1974/75 seasons.

In 1970-71 they were winning the next highest League in Norway. and then they were promoted to the highest League in Norway for the season 1971-72, and winning that season, and then they were winning as a Norwegian Champions again in 1974 and in 1976

== Football ==
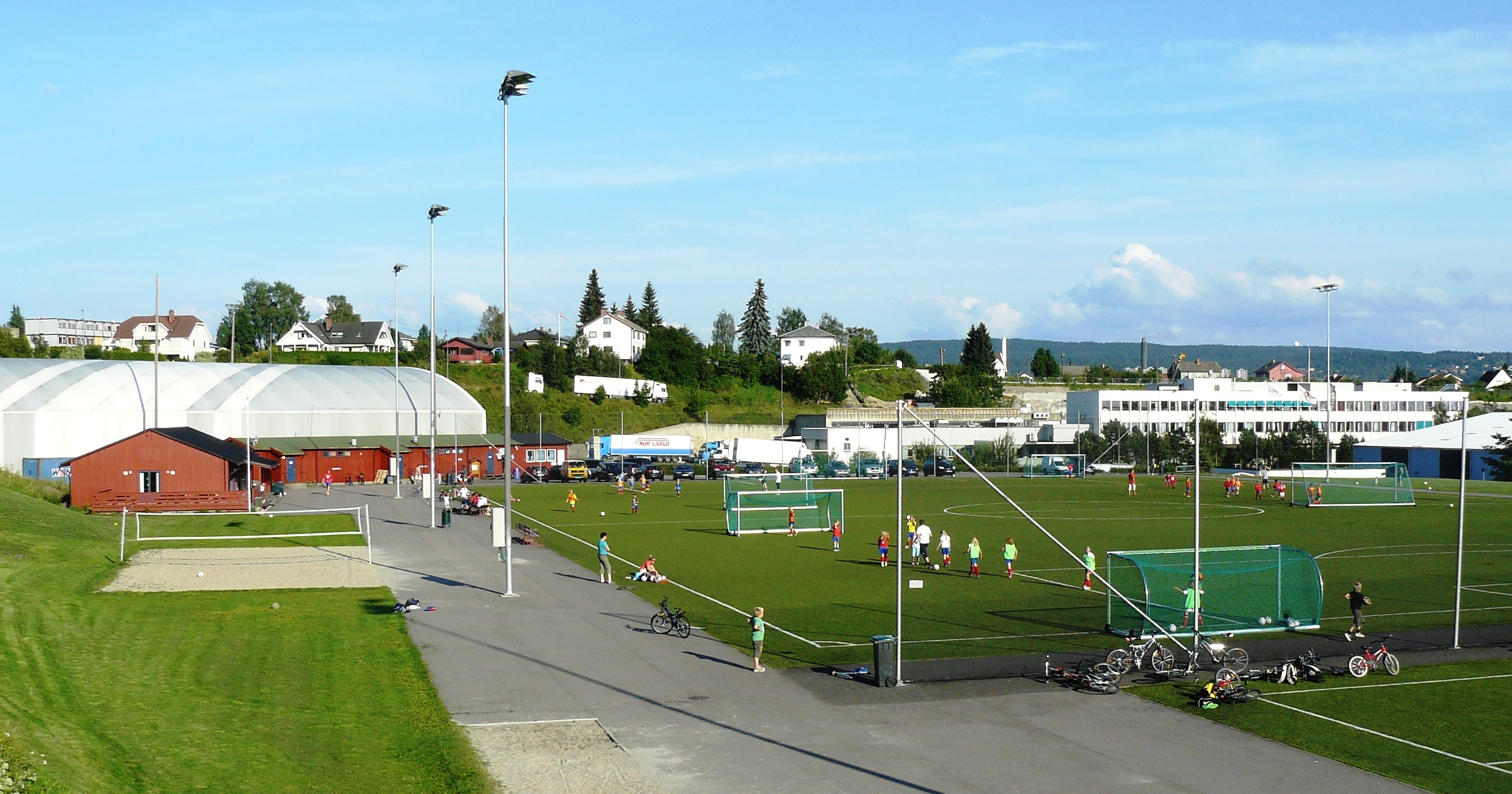
Lørenbanen

The men's football team won promotion to the Norwegian Second Division, the third highest tier, in 2010 after winning the league and playoffs. In the 2011 Norwegian Second Division campaign, Hasle-Løren was relegated. A famous former coach is Egil Olsen.

From the 2000 season it formed a cooperation with neighboring clubs Årvoll IL and Linderud IL to field an umbrella team named Bjerkealliansen on junior level (age 19 and below). In 2008 Hasle-Løren broke out of the alliance.
