= 1954 FIFA World Cup qualification Group 1 =

Football tournament qualification stage

The three teams in this group played against each other on a home-and-away basis. The group winner West Germany qualified for the fifth FIFA World Cup held in Switzerland. Dates : 24/6/1953-28/3/1954

== Group 1 ==
Pos	Team	Pld	HW	HD	HL	HGF	HGA	AW	AD	AL	AGF	AGA	GD	Pts	Qualification	Germany national football team	Saarland national football team	Norway national football team
1	West Germany (Q)	4	2	0	0	8	1	1	1	0	4	2	+9	7	Qualification to World Cup	—	3–0	5–1
2	Saar	4	0	1	1	1	3	1	0	1	3	5	−4	3		1–3	—	0–0
3	Norway	4	0	1	1	3	4	0	1	1	1	5	−5	2		1–1	2–3	—

(Q) Qualified to the phase indicated

=== Norway vs Saarland ===
Norway	2 — 3 (final score after 90 minutes)	(Saar Protectorate) Saarland
Manager: (Austria) Willibald Hahn Team: GK - Olaf Førli; DF - Erik Holmberg; DF - Yngve Karlsen; MF - Thorbjørn Svenssen; MF - Thor Hernes; MF - Thorleif Olsen; FW - Gunnar Thoresen; FW - Asbjørn Andersen; FW - Knut Dahlen; FW - Leif Olsen; FW - Harald Hennum; Substitutes: none Unused Substitutes: GK - Asbjørn Hansen; DF - Harry Boye Karlsen; DF - Arne Bakker; FW - Kjell Kristiansen; FW - Willy Olsen; Scorers: 1-0 Gunnar Thoresen (3'); 2-0 Knut Dahlen (15')	Half-time: 2-2 Competition: World Cup qualifier 1954 (Group 1) Date: Wednesday; June 24, 1953 Kick off: ? Venue: Bislett stadion, Oslo Attendance: 28000 Referee: J Bronkhorst NED Assistants: ? Match rules: 90 minutes one injured player can be substituted before half time	Manager: (West Germany) Helmut Schön Team: GK - Erwin Strempel; DF - Theodor Puff sub first half; DF - Albert Keck; MF - Kurt Clemens; MF - Peter Momber; MF - Waldemar Philippi; FW - Werner Otto; FW - Herbert Martin; FW - Herbert Binkert; FW - Gerhard Siedl; FW - Karl Schirra; Substitutes: MF - Karl Berg on first half; Unused Substitutes: ? Scorers: 2-1 Herbert Binkert (16'); 2-2 Werner Otto (30'); 2-3 Gerhard Siedl (55')

=== Norway vs West Germany ===
Norway	1 — 1 (final score after 90 minutes)	West Germany
Manager: (Austria) Willibald Hahn Team: GK - Asbjørn Hansen; DF - Harry Boye Karlsen; DF - Oddvar Hansen; MF - Thorbjørn Svenssen; MF - Thor Hernes; MF - Thorleif Olsen; FW - Leif Olsen; FW - Arne Natland; FW - Gunnar Dybwad sub 63' injured; FW - Gunnar Thoresen; FW - Harald Hennum; Substitutes: none Unused Substitutes: GK - Olaf Førli; ? - Knut Gudem; FW - Ragnar Hvidsten; Scorers: 1-0 Harald Hennum (41')	Half-time: 1-1 Competition: World Cup qualifier 1954 (Group 1) Date: Wednesday; August 19, 1953 Kick off: ? Venue: Ullevaal Stadion, Oslo Attendance: 32266 Referee: W. B. Aussum NED Assistants: ? Match rules: 90 minutes one injured player can be substituted before half time	Manager: (West Germany) Sepp Herberger Team: GK - Toni Turek; DF - Werner Kohlmeyer; DF - Erich Retter; MF - Erich Schanko; MF - Jupp Posipal; MF - Horst Eckel; FW - Hans Schäfer sub 42'; FW - Fritz Walter (capt.); FW - Ottmar Walter; FW - Max Morlock; FW - Helmut Rahn; Substitutes: FW - Alfred Pfaff on 42'; Unused Substitutes: ? Scorers: 1-1 Fritz Walter (44')

=== West Germany vs Saarland ===
West Germany	3 — 0 (final score after 90 minutes)	(Saar Protectorate) Saarland
Manager: (West Germany) Sepp Herberger Team: GK - Toni Turek; DF - Herbert Erhardt; DF - Erich Retter; MF - Richard Gottinger sub 38'; MF - Jupp Posipal; MF - Karl Mai; FW - Hans Schäfer; FW - Karl-Heinz Metzner; FW - Horst Schade; FW - Max Morlock; FW - Helmut Rahn; Substitutes: MF - Horst Eckel on 38'; Unused Substitutes: ? Scorers: 1-0 Max Morlock (13'); 2-0 Max Morlock (51'); 3-0 Horst Schade (71')	Half-time: 1-0 Competition: World Cup qualifier 1954 (Group 1) Date: Sunday; October 11, 1953 Kick off: ? Venue: Neckarstadion, Stuttgart Attendance: 50000 Referee: Karel van der Meer NED Assistants: ? Match rules: 90 minutes one injured player can be substituted before half time	Manager: (West Germany) Helmut Schön Team: GK - Erwin Strempel; DF - Theodor Puff; DF - Nikolaus Biewer; MF - Waldemar Philippi; MF - Peter Momber; MF - Karl Berg sub 65' injured; FW - Gerhard Siedl; FW - Kurt Clemens; FW - Jakob Balzert; FW - Herbert Martin; FW - Werner Otto; Substitutes: none Unused Substitutes: ? Scorers: -

=== Saarland vs Norway ===
(Saar Protectorate) Saarland	0 — 0 (final score after 90 minutes)	Norway
Manager: (West Germany) Helmut Schön Team: GK - Erwin Strempel; DF - Theodor Puff; DF - Nikolaus Biewer; MF - Kurt Clemens; MF - Waldemar Philippi; MF - Peter Momber; FW - Helmut Fottner; FW - Gerhard Siedl; FW - Jakob Balzert; FW - Herbert Martin; FW - Werner Otto; Substitutes: none Unused Substitutes: ? Scorers: -	Half-time: 0-0 Competition: World Cup qualifier 1954 (Group 1) Date: Sunday; November 8, 1953 Kick off: ? Venue: Ludwigsparkstadion, Saarbrücken Attendance: 45000 Referee: Leo Horn NED Assistants: ? Match rules: 90 minutes one injured player can be substituted before half time	Manager: (Austria) Willibald Hahn Team: GK - Asbjørn Hansen; DF - Harry Boye Karlsen; DF - Oddvar Hansen; MF - Thorbjørn Svenssen; MF - Thor Hernes; MF - Thorleif Olsen; FW - Willy Olsen; FW - Hans Nordahl; FW - Gunnar Dybwad; FW - Gunnar Thoresen; FW - Harald Hennum; Substitutes: none Unused Substitutes: GK - Olaf Førli; DF - Erik Holmberg; FW - Ragnar Hvidsten; FW - Arne Natland; Scorers: -

=== West Germany vs Norway ===
West Germany	5 — 1 (final score after 90 minutes)	Norway
Manager: (West Germany) Sepp Herberger Team: GK - Toni Turek; DF - Werner Kohlmeyer; DF - Erich Retter; MF - Horst Eckel; MF - Jupp Posipal; MF - Karl Mai; FW - Richard Herrmann; FW - Fritz Walter (capt.); FW - Ottmar Walter; FW - Max Morlock; FW - Helmut Rahn; Substitutes: none Unused Substitutes: ? Scorers: 1-1 Max Morlock (26'); 2-1 Max Morlock (63'); 3-1 Ottmar Walter (69'); 4-1 Fritz Walter (80'); 5-1 Helmut Rahn (86')	Half-time: 1-1 Competition: World Cup qualifier 1954 (Group 1) Date: Sunday; November 22, 1953 Kick off: ? Venue: Volksparkstadion, Hamburg Attendance: 76000 Referee: Archer Luty ENG Assistants: ? Match rules: 90 minutes one injured player can be substituted before half time	Manager: (Austria) Willibald Hahn Team: GK - Asbjørn Hansen; DF - Harry Boye Karlsen sub 29'; DF - Oddvar Hansen; MF - Thorbjørn Svenssen; MF - Thor Hernes; MF - Thorleif Olsen; FW - Ragnar Hvidsten; FW - Hans Nordahl; FW - Gunnar Dybwad; FW - Gunnar Thoresen; FW - Willy Fossli; Substitutes: DF - Erik Holmberg on 29'; Unused Substitutes: GK - Olaf Førli; FW - Harald Hennum; FW - Arne Natland; Scorers: 0-1 Hans Nordahl (22')

=== Saarland vs West Germany ===
(Saar Protectorate) Saarland	1 — 3 (final score after 90 minutes)	West Germany
Manager: (West Germany) Helmut Schön Team: GK - Erwin Strempel; DF - Albert Keck; DF - Nikolaus Biewer; MF - Kurt Clemens; MF - Waldemar Philippi sub injured (*); MF - Peter Momber; FW - Karl Schirra; FW - Gerhard Siedl; FW - Herbert Binkert; FW - Herbert Martin; FW - Werner Otto; Substitutes: none Unused Substitutes: ? Scorers: 1-2 Herbert Martin (67', pen.)(**)	Half-time: 0-1 Competition: World Cup qualifier 1954 (Group 1) Date: Sunday; March 28, 1954 Kick off: ? Venue: Ludwigsparkstadion, Saarbrücken Attendance: 53000 Referee: Jan Bronkhorst NED Assistants: ? Match rules: 90 minutes one injured player can be substituted before half time	Manager: (West Germany) Sepp Herberger Team: GK - Toni Turek; DF - Werner Kohlmeyer; DF - Erich Retter; MF - Erich Schanko; MF - Werner Liebrich; MF - Jupp Posipal; FW - Hans Schäfer; FW - Josef Röhrig; FW - Fritz Walter (capt.) sub 31'; FW - Max Morlock; FW - Helmut Rahn; Substitutes: FW - Ottmar Walter on 31'; Unused Substitutes: ? Scorers: 0-1 Max Morlock (37'); 0-2 Max Morlock (51'); 1-3 Hans Schäfer (83')

(*) shortly after half time

(**) after a handball by Erich Schanko

== Team stats ==
=== Germany ===
Head coach: (Germany) Sepp Herberger

Pos.	Player	DoB	Games played	Goals	Minutes played	Sub off	Sub on	(Norway)	(Saar Protectorate)	(Norway)	(Saar Protectorate)	Club
MF	Horst Eckel	February 8, 1932	3	0	232	0	1	90	52	90	-	(Germany) 1. FC Kaiserslautern
DF	Herbert Erhardt	July 6, 1930	1	0	90	0	0	-	90	-	-	(Germany) SpVgg Fürth
MF	Richard Gottinger	June 4, 1926	1	0	38	1	0	-	38	-	-	(Germany) SpVgg Fürth
FW	Richard Herrmann	January 20, 1923	1	0	90	0	0	-	-	90	-	(Germany) FSV Frankfurt
DF	Werner Kohlmeyer	April 19, 1924	3	0	270	0	0	90	-	90	90	(Germany) 1. FC Kaiserslautern
MF	Werner Liebrich	January 18, 1927	1	0	90	0	0	-	-	-	90	(Germany) 1. FC Kaiserslautern
MF	Karl Mai	July 27, 1928	2	0	180	0	0	-	90	90	-	(Germany) SpVgg Fürth
FW	Karl-Heinz Metzner	January 9, 1923	1	0	90	0	0	-	90	-	-	(Germany) Hessen Kassel
FW	Max Morlock	May 11, 1925	4	6	360	0	0	90	90	90	90	(Germany) 1. FC Nürnberg
FW	Alfred Pfaff	July 16, 1926	1	0	48	0	1	48	-	-	-	(Germany) Eintracht Frankfurt
MF	Jupp Posipal	June 20, 1927	4	0	360	0	0	90	90	90	90	(Germany) Hamburger SV
FW	Helmut Rahn	August 16, 1929	4	1	360	0	0	90	90	90	90	(Germany) Rot-Weiss Essen
DF	Erich Retter	February 17, 1925	4	0	360	0	0	90	90	90	90	(Germany) VfB Stuttgart
FW	Josef Röhrig	February 28, 1925	1	0	90	0	0	-	-	-	90	(Germany) 1. FC Köln
FW	Horst Schade	July 10, 1922	1	1	90	0	0	-	90	-	-	(Germany) 1. FC Nürnberg
FW	Hans Schäfer	October 19, 1927	3	1	222	1	0	42	90	-	90	(Germany) 1. FC Köln
MF	Erich Schanko	October 4, 1919	2	0	180	0	0	90	-	-	90	(Germany) Borussia Dortmund
GK	Toni Turek	January 18, 1919	4	0	360	0	0	90	90	90	90	(Germany) Fortuna Düsseldorf
FW	Ottmar Walter	March 6, 1924	3	1	239	0	1	90	-	90	59	(Germany) 1. FC Kaiserslautern
FW	Fritz Walter	October 31, 1920	3	2	211	1	0	90	-	90	31	(Germany) 1. FC Kaiserslautern

=== Saar ===
Head coach: (West Germany) Helmut Schön

Pos.	Player	DoB	Games played	Goals	Minutes played	Sub off	Sub on	(Norway)	(West Germany)	(Norway)	(West Germany)	Club
FW	Jakob Balzert	January 6, 1918	2	0	180	0	0	-	90	90	-	(Saar Protectorate) 1. FC Saarbrücken
MF	Karl Berg	January 12, 1921	2	0	>110	1	1	?	65	-	-	(Saar Protectorate) 1. FC Saarbrücken
DF	Nikolaus Biewer	January 24, 1924	3	0	270	0	0	-	90	90	90	(Saar Protectorate) 1. FC Saarbrücken
FW	Herbert Binkert	September 3, 1923	2	1	180	0	0	90	-	-	90	(Saar Protectorate) 1. FC Saarbrücken
MF	Kurt Clemens	November 7, 1925	4	0	360	0	0	90	90	90	90	(Saar Protectorate) Saar 05
FW	Helmut Fottner	December 24, 1927	1	0	90	0	0	-	-	90	-	(Saar Protectorate) Saar 05
DF	Albert Keck	August 4, 1930	2	0	180	0	0	90	-	-	90	(Saar Protectorate) 1. FC Saarbrücken
FW	Herbert Martin	August 29, 1925	4	1	360	0	0	90	90	90	90	(Saar Protectorate) 1. FC Saarbrücken
MF	Peter Momber	January 4, 1921	4	0	360	0	0	90	90	90	90	(Saar Protectorate) 1. FC Saarbrücken
FW	Werner Otto	January 3, 1929	4	1	360	0	0	90	90	90	90	(Saar Protectorate) 1. FC Saarbrücken
MF	Waldemar Philippi	April 13, 1929	4	0	>315	1	0	90	90	90	?	(Saar Protectorate) 1. FC Saarbrücken
DF	Theodor Puff	November 21, 1927	3	0	>180	1	0	?	90	90	-	(Saar Protectorate) 1. FC Saarbrücken
FW	Karl Schirra	October 16, 1928	2	0	180	0	0	90	-	-		(West Germany) Borussia Neunkirchen
FW	Karl Schirra	October 16, 1928	2	0	180	0	0				90	(Saar Protectorate) 1. FC Saarbrücken
FW	Gerhard Siedl	March 22, 1929	4	1	360	0	0	90				(West Germany) Borussia Neunkirchen
FW	Gerhard Siedl	March 22, 1929	4	1	360	0	0		90	90	90	(Saar Protectorate) 1. FC Saarbrücken
GK	Erwin Strempel	January 6, 1924	4	0	360	0	0	90	90	90	90	(Saar Protectorate) 1. FC Saarbrücken

=== Norway ===
Head coach: (Austria) Willibald Hahn

Pos.	Player	DoB	Games played	Goals	Minutes played	Sub off	Sub on	(Saar Protectorate)	(West Germany)	(Saar Protectorate)	(West Germany)	Club
FW	Asbjørn Andersen	December 31, 1922	1	0	90	0	0	90	-	-	-	(Norway) Vålerenga
DF	Arne Bakker	February 18, 1930	0	0	0	0	0	B	-	-	-	(Norway) Asker Fotball
FW	Knut Dahlen	September 28, 1922	1	1	90	0	0	90	-	-	-	(Norway) Raufoss IL
FW	Gunnar Dybwad	August 21, 1928	3	0	243	1	0	-	63	90	90	(Norway) Steinkjer FK
GK	Olaf Førli	July 20, 1920	1	0	90	0	0	90	B	B	B	(Norway) Larvik Turn
FW	Willy Fossli	July 8, 1931	1	0	90	0	0	-	-	-	90	(Norway) Asker Fotball
	Knut Gudem		0	0	0	0	0	-	B	-	-
GK	Asbjørn Hansen	May 29, 1930	3	0	270	0	0	B	90	90	90	(Norway) Sparta
DF	Oddvar Hansen	April 11, 1921	3	0	270	0	0	-	90	90	90	(Norway) Brann
FW	Harald Hennum	May 29, 1928	3	1	270	0	0	90	90	90	B	(Norway) Skeid
MF	Thor Hernes	August 15, 1926	4	0	360	0	0	90	90	90	90	(Norway) Lyn
DF	Erik Holmberg	May 24, 1922	2	0	151	0	1	90	-	B	61	(Norway) Fredrikstad FK
FW	Ragnar Hvidsten	December 3, 1926	1	0	90	0	0	-	B	B	90	(Norway) Skeid Fotball
DF	Harry Boye Karlsen	March 14, 1921	3	0	209	1	0	B	90	90	29	(Norway) Larvik Turn
DF	Yngve Karlsen	February 28, 1930	1	0	90	0	0	90	-	-	-	(Norway) Sandefjord Ballklubb
FW	Kjell Kristiansen	March 19, 1925	0	0	0	0	0	B	-	-	-	(Norway) Asker Fotball
FW	Arne Natland	May 22, 1927	1	0	90	0	0	-	90	B	B	(Norway) Eik-Tønsberg
FW	Hans Nordahl	April 29, 1918	2	1	180	0	0	-	-	90	90	(Norway) Skeid Fotball
FW	Leif Olsen	August 15, 1927	2	0	180	0	0	90	90	-	-	(Norway) Vålerenga
MF	Thorleif Olsen	November 15, 1921	4	0	360	0	0	90	90	90	90	(Norway) Vålerenga
FW	Willy Olsen	January 25, 1921	1	0	90	0	0	B	-	90	-	(Norway) Fredrikstad FK
MF	Thorbjørn Svenssen	April 22, 1924	4	0	360	0	0	90	90	90	90	(Norway) Sandefjord Ballklubb
FW	Gunnar Thoresen	July 21, 1920	4	1	360	0	0	90	90	90	90	(Norway) Larvik Turn
