= Norwegian Football Association Gold Watch =

Award given to Norwegian footballers

The Norwegian Football Association Gold Watch (Norwegian: Gullklokka) is an honorary proof that's awarded to all Norwegian footballers who reaches 25 caps for the Norway national football team. The watch is awarded by the Norges Fotballforbund. Gunnar Andersen was the first player to reach this milestone, when he was capped for the 25th time on 29 June 1919.

The Gold Watch was introduced in 1930, when the four players with 25 caps, (Gunnar Andersen, Per Skou, Einar Gundersen and Adolph Wold) were awarded the Gold Watch during a banquet at the Grand Hotel in Oslo.

In total, 163 male players have received the gold watch, the most recent being Haitam Aleesami, who received the award after Norway's Euro 2020 qualifying match against Sweden on 8 September 2019.

== Recipients ==
Players in bold are still active.

	Name	Clubs	Caps	Date	age^{[a]}
1	John Arne Riise	Monaco, Liverpool, Roma, Fulham	110	11 June 2003	22 years, 260 days
2	Thorbjørn Svenssen	Sandefjord BK	104	6 June 1951	27 years, 45 days
3	Henning Berg	Lillestrøm, Blackburn, Manchester United, Rangers	100	29 March 1995	25 years, 209 days
4	Erik Thorstvedt	Eik-Tønsberg, Viking, Borussia Mönchengladbach, IFK Göteborg, Tottenham	97	14 August 1985	22 years, 290 days
5	John Carew	Vålerenga, Rosenborg, Valencia, Roma, Beşiktaş, Lyon, Aston Villa, Stoke, West Ham	91	5 September 2001	22 years, 0 days
6	Brede Hangeland	Viking, FC København, Fulham	91	24 May 2006	24 years, 338 days
7	Øyvind Leonhardsen	Molde, Rosenborg, Wimbledon, Liverpool, Tottenham, Aston Villa	86	8 September 1993	23 years, 22 days
8	**Morten Gamst Pedersen**	Tromsø, Blackburn	83	2 September 2006	24 years, 359 days
9	Kjetil Rekdal	Molde, Borussia Mönchengladbach, Lierse, Rennes, Hertha Berlin	83	13 October 1993	24 years, 341 days
10	Steffen Iversen	Tottenham, Wolverhampton, Vålerenga, Rosenborg, Crystal Palace	79	15 August 2001	24 years, 278 days
11	Erik Mykland	Start, Utrecht, FC Linz, Panathinaikos, 1860 München	78	5 June 1994	22 years, 319 days
12	Svein Grøndalen	Raufoss, Rosenborg, Moss	77	25 August 1976	21 years, 199 days
13	Tore André Flo	Sogndal, Tromsø, Brann, Chelsea, Rangers, Sunderland, Siena	76	27 May 1998	24 years, 346 days
14	Stig Inge Bjørnebye	Kongsvinger, Rosenborg, Liverpool, Blackburn	75	28 April 1993	23 years, 138 days
15	Jan Åge Fjørtoft	HamKam, Lillestrøm, Rapid Wien, Swindon, Middlesbrough	71	31 October 1990	23 years, 294 days
16	Ole Gunnar Solskjær	Molde, Manchester United	67	8 September 1999	26 years, 194 days
17	Terje Kojedal	HamKam, Mulhouse, Valenciennes	66	29 July 1984	26 years, 348 days
18	Jahn Ivar Jakobsen	Rosenborg, Young Boys, MSV Duisburg, Lierse	65	30 October 1991	25 years, 356 days
19	**Rune Jarstein**	Odd, Rosenborg, Viking, Hertha BSC	65	16 October 2012	28 years, 17 days
20	Gunnar Halle	Lillestrøm, Oldham, Leeds, Bradford	64	10 October 1990	25 years, 60 days
21	Gunnar Thoresen	Larvik Turn	64	15 August 1950	30 years, 25 days
22	André Bergdølmo	Rosenborg, Ajax, Borussia Dortmund, FC København	63	13 June 2000	28 years, 244 days
23	Ronny Johnsen	Eik-Tønsberg, Lyn, Lillestrøm, Beşiktaş, Manchester United, Aston Villa, Vålerenga	63	9 October 1996	27 years, 121 days
24	Olav Nilsen	Viking	62	31 October 1965	23 years, 280 days
25	Roar Johansen	Fredrikstad	61	16 September 1962	27 years, 70 days
26	Rune Bratseth	Rosenborg, Werder Bremen	60	11 October 1989	28 years, 206 days
27	**Tarik Elyounoussi**	Fredrikstad, Heerenveen, Rosenborg, Hoffenheim, Olympiacos, Qarabağ, AIK	60	11 October 2013	25 years, 230 days
28	Harry Boye Karlsen	Larvik Turn, Lyn, Ørn	58	15 May 1951	31 years, 62 days
29	Ståle Solbakken	Lillestrøm, Aalborg	58	29 March 1997	29 years, 30 days
30	Thomas Myhre	Everton, FC København, Beşiktaş, Sunderland, Charlton	56	27 March 2002	28 years, 162 days
31	Gøran Sørloth	Rosenborg, Borussia Mönchengladbach, Bursaspor	55	25 October 1989	27 years, 101 days
32	Per Egil Ahlsen	Fredrikstad, Brann, Düsseldorf	54	16 October 1985	27 years, 226 days
33	Arne Bakker	Asker	54	1 September 1957	27 years, 195 days
34	Christian Grindheim	Vålerenga, Heerenveen	54	1 April 2009	25 years, 258 days
35	**Markus Henriksen**	Rosenborg, AZ, Hull City	54	29 May 2016	23 years, 309 days
36	Arne Larsen Økland	Bryne, Bayer Leverkusen, Racing Paris	54	17 June 1981	27 years, 17 days
37	Jostein Flo	Molde, Sogndal, Sheffield United, Strømsgodset	53	23 June 1994	29 years, 263 days
38	Daniel Braaten	Skeid, Bosenborg, Bolton, Toulouse, FC København	52	14 November 2009	27 years, 173 days
39	Asbjørn Hansen	Sparta, Sarpsborg	52	30 May 1956	26 years, 1 day
40	**Stefan Johansen**	Strømsgodset, Celtic, Fulham, West Bromwich	52	24 March 2016	25 years, 76 days
41	Tor Egil Johansen	Skeid, Lillestrøm	52	18 June 1975	24 years, 314 days
42	**Håvard Nordtveit**	Borussia Mönchengladbach, West Ham, Hoffenheim, Fulham	52	3 September 2015	25 years, 74 days
43	Vidar Riseth	LASK Linz, Celtic, 1860 München, Rosenborg	52	27 May 2000	28 years, 36 days
44	Reidar Kvammen	Viking	51	19 September 1937	23 years, 58 days
45	Frode Grodås	Lillestrøm, Chelsea, Tottenham, Schalke 04, Hønefoss	50	1 September 1996	31 years, 313 days
46	Åge Hareide	Molde, Manchester City, Norwich	50	12 October 1983	30 years, 19 days
47	Hallvar Thoresen	FC Twente, PSV Eindhoven	50	1 June 1983	26 years, 50 days
48	Lars Bohinen	Vålerenga, Young Boys, Lillestrøm, Nottingham Forest, Blackburn, Derby	49	9 March 1994	24 years, 182 days
49	Tom Høgli	Tromsø, Club Brugge	49	26 May 2012	28 years, 92 days
50	Henry Johansen	Vålerenga	48	10 June 1934	29 years, 324 days
51	Finn Thorsen	Ham-Kam, Skeid	48	14 August 1966	26 years, 157 days
52	Nils Eriksen	Odd, Moss	47	1 November 1936	25 years, 241 days
53	Tom Lund	Lillestrøm	47	9 June 1975	24 years, 272 days
54	Gunnar Andersen	Lillestrøm	46	29 June 1919	29 years, 103 days
55	Vidar Davidsen	Frigg, Vålerenga	46	20 June 1984	26 years, 168 days
56	**Joshua King**	Manchester United, Blackburn, AFC Bournemouth	46	8 October 2016	24 years, 267 days
57	Petter Rudi	Molde, Perugia, Sheffield Wednesday, Lokeren, Germinal Beerschot	46	30 May 1999	25 years, 255 days
58	Odd Iversen	Rosenborg, Racing Mechelen, Vålerenga	45	23 September 1970	24 years, 321 days
59	Jørgen Juve	Lyn	45	24 September 1933	26 years, 306 days
60	Tore Pedersen	IFK Göteborg, Brann, Oldham, Sanfrecce Hiroshima, St. Pauli, Eintracht Frankfurt	45	2 June 1993	23 years, 246 days
61	**Omar Elabdellaoui**	Eintracht Braunschweig, Olympiacos, Hull City	44	1 September 2017	25 years, 270 days
62	Martin Andresen	Stabæk, Blackburn, Brann, Vålerenga	43	2 September 2006	29 years, 212 days
63	Harald Berg	Bodø/Glimt, Lyn, FC Den Haag	43	3 September 1967	25 years, 298 days
64	Trygve Bornø	Skeid	43	10 September 1969	27 years, 220 days
65	Harald Hennum	Skeid, Frigg	43	13 October 1957	29 years, 137 days
66	Per Ciljan Skjelbred	Rosenborg, Hamburg, Hertha BSC	43	9 September 2014	27 years, 85 days
67	Pål Jacobsen	Ham-Kam, Vålerenga	42	12 August 1981	25 years, 84 days
68	Sigbjørn Slinning	Viking	42	23 February 1972	26 years, 140 days
69	Roar Strand	Rosenborg	42	18 June 2000	30 years, 137 days
70	Sverre Andersen	Viking	41	4 June 1963	26 years, 238 days
71	Arne Legernes	Larvik Turn, Molde, Freidig	41	29 June 1958	27 years, 42 days
72	Trond Pedersen	Start	41	9 May 1979	28 years, 88 days
73	Per Skou	Odd, Lyn	41	21 September 1919	28 years, 124 days
74	Christer Basma	Stabæk, Rosenborg	40	30 April 2003	30 years, 272 days
75	Claus Lundekvam	Brann, Southampton	40	19 November 2003	30 years, 270 days
76	Arne Pedersen	Fredrikstad	40	8 November 1964	33 years, 7 days
77	Jan Gunnar Solli	Rosenborg, Brann	40	12 October 2005	24 years, 176 days
78	Ruben Yttergård Jenssen	Tromsø, Kaiserslautern	39	11 June 2013	25 years, 38 days
79	Erik Solér	Lillestrøm, Eik, Hamburger SV, Brann, AGF Aarhus	39	22 May 1985	24 years, 289 days
80	Tom Sundby	Lillestrøm, Iraklis	39	4 June 1986	25 years, 171 days
81	Harald Sunde	Nidelv, Rosenborg, Racing Mechelen	39	6 November 1968	24 years, 259 days
82	Trond Andersen	Molde, Wimbledon, Aalborg	38	2 April 2003	28 years, 86 days
83	Anders Giske	Brann, Lillestrøm, Bayer Leverkusen, Nürnberg	38	28 May 1987	27 years, 187 days
84	Thorstein Helstad	Brann, Austria Wien, Rosenborg, Le Mans	38	8 September 2007	30 years, 133 days
85	Erik Johansen	Gjøvik-Lyn, Skeid	38	31 October 1965	25 years, 198 days
86	Svein Kvia	Viking	38	30 June 1975	27 years, 276 days
87	Sigurd Rushfeldt	Tromsø, Rosenborg, Austria Wien	38	18 February 2004	31 years, 69 days
88	Bent Skammelsrud	Drøbak/Frogn, Frigg, Malmö FF, Rosenborg, Bayer Leverkusen	38	20 January 1999	32 years, 247 days
89	Alexander Olsen	Brann	37	1 June 1930	31 years, 88 days
90	Kjetil Osvold	Start, Lillestrøm, Nottingham Forest, Djurgården, PAOK	37	1 June 1988	26 years, 362 days
91	Bjørn Spydevold	Greåker, Fredrikstad	37	26 November 1950	32 years, 79 days
92	Øivind Holmsen	Lyn	36	4 September 1938	26 years, 129 days
93	Erik Huseklepp	Brann, Bari, Portsmouth, Birmingham	36	11 October 2011	27 years, 36 days
94	Karl-Petter Løken	Rosenborg	36	5 June 1991	24 years, 295 days
95	Einar Jan Aas	Moss, Bayern Munich, Nottingham Forest	35	10 September 1980	24 years, 334 days
96	Bjørn Borgen	Fredrikstad, Lyn	35	6 November 1960	23 years, 45 days
97	Sverre Brandhaug	Rosenborg	35	28 September 1988	29 years, 98 days
98	Kai Erik Herlovsen	Fredrikstad, Borussia Mönchengladbach	35	24 September 1986	26 years, 364 days
99	Frode Johnsen	Rosenborg, Nagoya Grampus Eight	35	13 October 2004	30 years, 210 days
100	Helge Karlsen	Brann	35	30 June 1977	29 years, 1 day
101	Per Pettersen	Frigg	35	3 August 1972	26 years, 28 days
102	Bjørn Helge Riise	Lillestrøm, Fulham, Sheffield United	35	7 September 2010	27 years, 78 days
103	**Espen Ruud**	OB	35	12 October 2012	28 years, 229 days
104	Alf-Inge Haaland	Nottingham Forest, Leeds, Manchester City	34	10 September 1997	24 years, 291 days
105	Kjell Kaspersen	Skeid	34	24 September 1967	28 years, 170 days
106	Thorleif Olsen	Vålerenga	34	5 May 1954	32 years, 171 days
107	Alexander Tettey	Rosenborg, Stade Rennais, Norwich	34	3 September 2015	29 years, 152 days
108	Mohammed Abdellaoue	Vålerenga, Hannover 96, VfB Stuttgart	33	22 March 2013	27 years, 150 days
109	Bjarne Berntsen	Viking	33	23 September 1981	24 years, 276 days
110	Jan Birkelund	Skeid, Lillestrøm	33	1 June 1977	26 years, 203 days
111	Arne Brustad	Lyn	33	9 November 1938	26 years, 209 days
112	Svein Fjælberg	Viking	33	26 February 1985	26 years, 45 days
113	Vegard Forren	Molde, Southampton	33	6 September 2015	27 years, 202 days
114	Einar Gundersen	Odd, Tønsberg Turn	33	17 June 1923	26 years, 270 days
115	Finn Berstad	Brann	32	2 November 1930	29 years, 108 days
116	Geir Karlsen	Odd, Rosenborg, Dunfermline, Vålerenga	32	8 August 1974	25 years, 324 days
117	Roger Nilsen	Viking, Köln, Sheffield United, Molde	32	7 June 1995	25 years, 303 days
118	**Ole Selnæs**	Rosenborg, Saint-Étienne, Shenzhen	32	26 March 2019	24 years, 262 days
119	**Alexander Søderlund**	Haugesund, Rosenborg, Saint-Étienne	32	24 March 2016	28 years, 234 days
120	Kjetil Wæhler	Vålerenga, AaB, IFK Göteborg	32	10 August 2011	35 years, 147 days
121	Harry Hestad	Molde, FC Den Haag	31	8 August 1974	29 years, 274 days
122	Roald Jensen	Brann, Hearts	31	7 November 1963	20 years, 298 days
123	Per Edmund Mordt	Vålerenga, IFK Göteborg	31	9 September 1987	22 years, 168 days
124	Erik Hoftun	Rosenborg	30	25 April 2001	32 years, 53 days
125	Nils Arne Eggen	Rosenborg, Vålerenga	29	21 July 1969	27 years, 307 days
126	Tore Kordahl	Lyn, Lillestrøm	29	3 June 1981	30 years, 168 days
127	Arild Mathisen	Strømsgodset, Vålerenga	29	21 July 1969	27 years, 129 days
128	**Tore Reginiussen**	Tromsø, OB, Rosenborg	29	23 March 2018	31 years, 347 days
129	**Haitam Aleesami**	IFK Göteborg, Palermo, Amiens	28	8 September 2019	28 years, 39 days
130	Otto Aulie	Odd, Lyn	28	2 September 1920	25 years, 341 days
131	Edgar Falch	Viking	28	28 June 1959	28 years, 238 days
132	Erik Hagen	Vålerenga, Zenit Saint Petersburg	28	12 September 2007	32 years, 54 days
133	Kristian Henriksen	Sarpsborg, Frigg, Lyn	28	26 August 1945	34 years, 176 days
134	Kristofer Hæstad	Start, Wigan, Vålerenga	28	20 August 2008	24 years, 255 days
135	**Ørjan Nyland**	Molde, Ingolstadt	28	8 October 2017	27 years, 28 days
136	Thor Spydevold	Sarpsborg, Fredrikstad	28	3 August 1972	27 years, 354 days
137	Stein Thunberg	Skeid, Start	28	9 May 1979	24 years, 362 days
138	Jørn Andersen	Vålerenga, Nürnberg, Frankfurt, Düsseldorf	27	22 August 1990	27 years, 200 days
139	Trygve Andersen	Årstad, Brann	27	11 November 1964	30 years, 124 days
140	Eirik Bakke	Sogndal, Leeds, Brann	27	11 June 2003	25 years, 271 days
141	Gunnar Dybwad	Steinkjer	27	8 July 1957	28 years, 321 days
142	Thor Hernes	Lyn	27	24 June 1956	29 years, 314 days
143	Erik Holmberg	Fredrikstad	27	21 July 1952	29 years, 60 days
144	**Even Hovland**	Sogndal, Molde, 1. FC Nürnberg, Rosenborg	27	13 October 2018	29 years, 241 days
145	Håvard Flo	AGF Aarhus, Werder Bremen, Wolverhampton, Sogndal	26	28 January 2004	33 years, 299 days
146	Rolf Holmberg	Odd	26	2 June 1939	24 years, 282 days
147	Tom R. Jacobsen	Fram, Bryne, Vålerenga	26	7 September 1983	30 years, 199 days
148	Kjell Kristiansen	Asker	26	21 August 1959	34 years, 155 days
149	Arne Natland	Eik, Skeid	26	18 September 1960	33 years, 119 days
150	Frode Olsen	Start, Stabæk, Sevilla, Viking	26	11 June 2003	35 years, 242 days
151	Edgar Stakset	Steinkjer	26	20 November 1966	29 years, 204 days
152	Adolph Wold	Ready	26	18 September 1921	28 years, 353 days
153	Roger Albertsen	FC Den Haag, Feyenoord, KFC Winterslag, Olympiakos	25	12 September 1984	27 years, 181 days
154	Jacob Berner	Trygg	25	2 November 1930	30 years, 298 days
155	Ola By Rise	Rosenborg	25	22 May 1994	33 years, 189 days
156	Arne Børresen	Fredrikstad	25	15 September 1937	29 years, 260 days
157	Dan Eggen	Brøndby, Celta Vigo, Deportivo Alavés	25	15 April 2001	31 years, 92 days
158	Thaulow Goberg	Odd	25	27 September 1931	34 years, 147 days
159	Jon Inge Høiland	Malmö FF, Kaiserslautern, Stabæk	25	29 May 2010	32 years, 251 days
160	Per Kristoffersen	Fredrikstad	25	20 November 1966	29 years, 39 days
161	Alf Martinsen	Lillestrøm	25	28 July 1946	34 years, 211 days
162	Svein Mathisen	Start	25	26 September 1984	31 years, 362 days
163	Odd Wang Sørensen	Sparta	25	25 May 1955	32 years, 154 days

Footnotes

- ^{[a]} The players age when making his 25th appearance.
