= 1951 in Norwegian football =

Football in Norway
Men's football
- Hovedserien: Fredrikstad
- NM: Sarpsborg

Results from Norwegian football in 1951.

== Hovedserien 1950/51 ==
=== Group A ===
Pos	Team	Pld	W	D	L	GF	GA	GD	Pts	Qualification or relegation
1	Fredrikstad (C)	14	10	3	1	44	14	+30	23	Qualification for the championship final
2	Vålerengen	14	7	5	2	35	21	+14	19	
3	Sandefjord BK	14	5	4	5	24	23	+1	14	
4	Viking	14	5	4	5	19	18	+1	14	
5	Brann	14	5	3	6	24	30	−6	13	
6	Strømmen	14	5	3	6	22	29	−7	13	
7	Lisleby (R)	14	3	3	8	21	35	−14	9	Relegation
8	Fram Larvik (R)	14	2	3	9	14	33	−19	7	Relegation

Source: RSSSF
(C) Champions; (R) Relegated

=== Group B ===
Pos	Team	Pld	W	D	L	GF	GA	GD	Pts	Qualification or relegation
1	Odd	14	7	6	1	31	13	+18	20	Qualification for the championship final
2	Lyn	14	6	7	1	41	18	+23	19	
3	Sparta	14	6	4	4	19	16	+3	16	
4	Skeid	14	6	4	4	29	28	+1	16	
5	Sarpsborg	14	4	5	5	20	21	−1	13	
6	Ørn	14	5	3	6	23	25	−2	13	
7	Selbak (R)	14	3	5	6	22	25	−3	11	Relegation
8	Kristiansund (R)	14	1	2	11	16	55	−39	4	Relegation

Source: RSSSF
(R) Relegated

=== Championship final ===
June 21: Odd - Fredrikstad 1-3

June 26: Fredrikstad - Odd 4-2 (agg. 7-3)

== First Division 1950/51 ==
After the 1950/51 season, Landsdelsserien was introduced, leaving the First division as only the third highest league.

=== District I ===
Pos	Team	Pld	W	D	L	GF	GA	GD	Pts	Qualification or relegation
1	Kvik (Halden)	14	8	4	2	25	16	+9	20	Play-off
2	Moss	14	7	5	2	30	13	+17	19	Relegated
3	Rapid	14	5	8	1	22	16	+6	18	Relegated
4	Borgen	14	5	5	4	25	23	+2	15	Relegated
5	Askim	14	5	2	7	23	27	−4	12	Relegated
6	Rakkestad	14	3	4	7	17	23	−6	10	Relegated
7	Tistedalen	14	4	2	8	13	22	−9	10	Relegated
8	Mysen	14	2	4	8	16	3	+13	8	Relegated

=== District II, Group A ===
Pos	Team	Pld	W	D	L	GF	GA	GD	Pts	Qualification or relegation
1	Asker	14	10	3	1	39	11	+28	23	Play-off
2	Lillestrøm	14	11	1	2	32	13	+19	23	
3	Sandaker	14	7	3	4	21	15	+6	17	
4	Drafn	14	8	0	6	29	23	+6	16	
5	Kjelsås	14	4	3	7	13	28	−15	11	Relegated
6	Mjøndalen	14	3	2	9	13	22	−9	8	Relegated
7	Bjørkelangen	14	1	5	8	14	31	−17	7	Relegated
8	Akademisk	14	2	3	9	12	30	−18	7	Relegated

=== District II, Group B ===
Pos	Team	Pld	W	D	L	GF	GA	GD	Pts	Qualification or relegation
1	Geithus	14	12	0	2	27	12	+15	24	Play-off
2	Solberg	14	11	1	2	48	21	+27	23	
3	Frigg	14	8	2	4	34	15	+19	18	
4	Sagene	14	9	0	5	22	20	+2	18	Relegated
5	Bækkelaget	14	3	3	8	14	31	−17	9	Relegated
6	Strong	14	3	2	9	9	21	−12	8	Relegated
7	Drammens BK	14	3	1	10	18	24	−6	7	Relegated
8	Nydalen	14	1	3	10	14	42	−28	5	Relegated

=== District III ===
Pos	Team	Pld	W	D	L	GF	GA	GD	Pts	Qualification or relegation
1	Gjøvik/Lyn	14	9	1	4	32	15	+17	19	Play-off
2	Kapp	14	8	3	3	36	29	+7	19	
3	Hamar IL	14	8	2	4	33	26	+7	18	Relegated
4	Raufoss	14	7	1	6	27	18	+9	15	Relegated
5	Fremad	14	7	1	6	30	23	+7	15	Relegated
6	Vang	14	5	1	8	25	46	−21	11	Relegated
7	Hamarkameratene	14	4	0	10	18	29	−11	8	Relegated
8	Mesna	14	2	3	9	14	29	−15	7	Relegated

=== District IV, Group A ===
Pos	Team	Pld	W	D	L	GF	GA	GD	Pts	Qualification or relegation
1	Snøgg	14	9	3	2	37	15	+22	21	Play-off
2	Stag	14	6	6	2	26	15	+11	18	
3	Herkules	14	6	5	3	17	20	−3	17	Relegated
4	Tønsberg Turn	14	5	4	5	27	21	+6	14	Relegated
5	Storm	14	4	5	5	10	15	−5	13	Relegated
6	Skiens-Grane	14	5	2	7	17	19	−2	12	Relegated
7	Urædd	14	4	1	9	13	34	−21	9	Relegated
8	Falk	14	4	0	10	16	24	−8	8	Relegated

=== District IV, Group B ===
Pos	Team	Pld	W	D	L	GF	GA	GD	Pts	Qualification or relegation
1	Larvik Turn	14	13	0	1	55	6	+49	26	Play-off
2	Pors	14	10	1	3	41	11	+30	21	
3	Eik	14	7	3	4	35	16	+19	17	
4	Skiens BK	14	8	1	5	30	16	+14	17	Relegated
5	Borg	14	8	1	5	26	24	+2	17	Relegated
6	Flint	14	3	0	11	18	48	−30	6	Relegated
7	Brevik	14	2	1	11	13	42	−29	5	Relegated
8	Sp.klubben 31	14	1	1	12	7	62	−55	3	Relegated

=== District V, Group A ===
Pos	Team	Pld	W	D	L	GF	GA	GD	Pts	Qualification or relegation
1	Flekkefjord	12	9	1	2	31	9	+22	19	Play-off
2	Start	12	7	2	3	31	12	+19	16	
3	Jerv	12	6	4	2	31	17	+14	16	
4	Sørfjell	12	7	0	5	30	27	+3	14	
5	Mandalskam.	12	3	2	7	25	30	−5	8	
6	Grane (Arendal)	12	4	0	8	13	37	−24	8	
7	AIK Lund	12	1	1	10	12	41	−29	3	Relegated

=== District V, Group B ===
Pos	Team	Pld	W	D	L	GF	GA	GD	Pts	Qualification or relegation
1	Ålgård	14	10	0	4	26	15	+11	20	Play-off
2	Vard	14	7	4	3	33	18	+15	18	
3	Nærbø	14	7	2	5	32	20	+12	16	
4	Bryne	14	7	2	5	24	25	−1	16	
5	Djerv 1919	14	4	5	5	25	24	+1	13	
6	Randaberg	14	4	3	7	17	26	−9	11	
7	Vidar	14	2	6	6	15	31	−16	10	Relegated
8	Stavanger IF	14	3	2	9	16	29	−13	8	Relegated

=== District VI ===
Pos	Team	Pld	W	D	L	GF	GA	GD	Pts	Qualification
1	Årstad	12	7	2	3	30	20	+10	16	Play-off
2	Baune	12	6	3	3	24	22	+2	15	
3	Varegg	12	6	2	4	27	23	+4	14	
4	Os	12	5	3	4	26	21	+5	13	
5	Nordnes	12	4	4	4	17	14	+3	12	
6	Djerv	12	1	6	5	16	23	−7	8	
7	Hardy	12	2	2	8	12	29	−17	6	

=== District VII ===
Pos	Team	Pld	W	D	L	GF	GA	GD	Pts	Qualification
1	Aalesund	10	6	2	2	30	7	+23	14	Play-off
2	Molde	10	6	2	2	18	6	+12	14	
3	Braatt	10	6	0	4	17	13	+4	12	
4	Rollon	10	4	1	5	13	21	−8	9	
5	Clausenengen	10	3	2	5	15	26	−11	8	
6	Hødd	10	1	1	8	11	31	−20	3	

=== District VIII ===
Pos	Team	Pld	W	D	L	GF	GA	GD	Pts	Qualification or relegation
1	Kvik (Tr.heim)	14	11	1	2	38	16	+22	23	Play-off
2	Ranheim	14	7	2	5	29	15	+14	16	
3	Rosenborg	14	7	2	5	20	19	+1	16	
4	Freidig	14	6	3	5	26	21	+5	15	
5	Steinkjer	14	7	0	7	28	28	0	14	
6	Falken	14	5	3	6	26	25	+1	13	
7	Brage	14	6	1	7	23	30	−7	13	
8	Tryggkameratene	14	1	0	13	12	48	−36	2	Relegated

=== Play-off Preliminary Round ===
Geithus - Asker 0-2

Larvik Turn - Snøgg 1-1

Ålgård - Flekkefjord 1-0

Asker - Geithus 3-0 (agg. 5-0)

Snøgg - Larvik Turn 2-1 (agg. 3-2)

Flekkefjord - Ålgård 0-0 (agg. 0-1)

=== Play-off Group A ===
Årstad - Snøgg 1-1

Ålgård - Gjøvik/Lyn 0-0

Årstad - Ålgård 1-0

Snøgg - Gjøvik/Lyn 4-0

Gjøvik/Lyn - Årstad 1-1

Snøgg - Ålgård 3-2

Pos	Team	Pld	W	D	L	GF	GA	GD	Pts	Promotion
1	Snøgg	3	2	1	0	8	3	+5	5	Promoted
2	Årstad	3	1	2	0	3	2	+1	4	Promoted
3	Gjøvik/Lyn	3	0	2	1	1	5	−4	2	
4	Ålgård	3	0	1	2	2	4	−2	1	

=== Play-off Group B ===
Kvik (Halden) - Kvik (Trondheim) 2-2

Aalesund - Asker 3-6

Asker - Kvik (Trondheim) 2-2

Kvik (Halden) - Aalesund 0-2

Asker - Kvik (Halden) 3-0

Kvik (Trondheim) - Aalesund 3-0

Pos	Team	Pld	W	D	L	GF	GA	GD	Pts	Promotion
1	Asker	3	2	1	0	11	5	+6	5	Promoted
2	Kvik (Tr.heim)	3	1	2	0	5	2	+3	4	Promoted
3	Aalesund	3	1	0	2	5	9	−4	2	
4	Kvik (Halden)	3	0	1	2	2	7	−5	1	

=== Promoted to First Division ===
Donn, Jarl, Langevåg, Neset, Nymark, Ulf and Wing.

== Norwegian Cup ==
=== Final ===
21 October 1951

Sarpsborg	3–2 (a.e.t.)	Asker
Johansen 18'; Nilsen 81', 103'	Report	Fossli 2'; Wettre-Johnsen 34'

Ullevaal Stadion, Oslo
Attendance: 30,639
Referee: Folke Bålstad (Mercantile/Trygg)

== Northern Norwegian Cup ==
=== Final ===
Mjølner	5–0	Narvik/Nor
	Report

== National team ==
15 May 1951 Friendly	England	2–1	Norway	Middlesbrough, England
18:00 (UTC+1); Match 176	Noble ?'; Robb ?'	Report	Sveinsson 87'	Stadium: Ayresome Park; Attendance: 12,000; Referee: Paddy Power (England)
Note: England played with their amateur team.

30 May 1951 Friendly	Norway	2–3	Republic of Ireland	Oslo, Norway
19:00 (UTC+1); Match 177	Sørensen 14'; Hvidsten 55'	Report	Farell 17'; Ringstead 67'; Coad 82'	Stadium: Ullevaal Stadion; Attendance: 20,913; Referee: Carl Frederik Jørgensen (Denmark)

6 June 1951 Friendly	Netherlands	2–3	Norway	Rotterdam, Netherlands
19:00 (UTC+1); Match 178	van Melis 44'; Lenstra 50'	Report	Johannessen 26', 59'; Sørensen 29'	Stadium: De Kuip; Attendance: 65,000; Referee: Giovani Galeati (Italy)

26 July 1951 Friendly	Norway	3–1	Iceland	Trondheim, Norway
19:00 (UTC+1); Match 179	Hennum 44'; Bjarnason 81' (o.g.); Hvidsten 90'	Report	Jónsson 82'	Stadium: Lerkendal Stadion; Attendance: 17,000; Referee: Helge Andersen (Denmark)

16 August 1951 1948–51 Nordic Championship	Finland	1–1	Norway	Helsinki, Finland
18:30 (UTC+2); Match 180	Vaihela 41'	Report	Bredesen 64'	Stadium: Helsinki Olympic Stadium; Attendance: 22,415; Referee: John Oskar Nilsson (Sweden)

23 August 1951 Friendly	Norway	2–4	Yugoslavia	Oslo, Norway
18:00 (UTC+1); Match 181	Dybwad 33', 57'	Report	Vukas 8'; Bobek 23', 30'; Zebec 27'	Stadium: Ullevaal Stadion; Attendance: 30,867; Referee: Aksel Asmussen (Denmark)

16 September 1951 1948–51 Nordic Championship	Norway	2–0	Denmark	Oslo, Norway
13:15 (UTC+1); Match 182	Thoresen 26'; Jørgensen 40' (o.g.)	Report		Stadium: Ullevaal Stadion; Attendance: 35,322; Referee: John Oskar Nilsson (Sweden)

30 September 1951 1948–51 Nordic Championship	Sweden	3–4	Norway	Gothenburg, Sweden
14:30 (UTC+1); Match 183	Rydell 13', 52'; Lindh 23' (pen.)	Report	Karlsen 5' (pen.), 71' (pen.); Dahlen 6'; Bredesen 64'	Stadium: Ullevi; Attendance: 29,790; Referee: Valdemar Laursen (Denmark)
