= 1957 in Norwegian football =

Football in Norway
- Season: 1957

Men's football
- Hovedserien: Fredrikstad
- Landsdelsserien: Eik (Group East/South); Raufoss (Group East/North); Donn (Group South/West A1); Stavanger (Group South/West A2); Brann (Group South/West B); Molde (Group Møre); Sverre (Group Trøndelag)
- NM: Fredrikstad

The 1957 season was the 52nd season of competitive football in Norway.

== Hovedserien 1956/57 ==
Fredrikstad FK won the Hovedserien title for the fifth time in nine seasons.

=== Group A ===
Pos	Team	Pld	W	D	L	GF	GA	GD	Pts	Qualification or relegation
1	Odd	14	7	6	1	23	14	+9	20	Qualification for the championship final
2	Larvik Turn	14	7	3	4	25	16	+9	17	
3	Sandefjord BK	14	8	1	5	23	14	+9	17	
4	Skeid	14	5	5	4	25	19	+6	15	
5	Viking	14	5	5	4	19	15	+4	15	
6	Sparta	14	2	6	6	17	28	−11	10	
7	Årstad (R)	14	3	3	8	21	32	−11	9	Relegation to Landsdelsserien
8	Sarpsborg FK (R)	14	3	3	8	14	29	−15	9	Relegation to Landsdelsserien

Source: RSSSF
(R) Relegated

=== Group B ===
Pos	Team	Pld	W	D	L	GF	GA	GD	Pts	Qualification or relegation
1	Fredrikstad (C)	14	11	1	2	60	25	+35	23	Qualification for the championship final
2	Strømmen	14	8	2	4	39	22	+17	18	
3	Lillestrøm	14	7	2	5	21	22	−1	16	
4	Asker	14	5	4	5	34	35	−1	14	
5	Steinkjer	14	5	4	5	26	41	−15	14	
6	Frigg	14	5	2	7	25	26	−1	12	
7	Vålerengen (R)	14	5	1	8	20	29	−9	11	Relegation to Landsdelsserien
8	Rapid (R)	14	2	0	12	15	40	−25	4	Relegation to Landsdelsserien

Source: RSSSF
(C) Champions; (R) Relegated

=== Championship final ===
- Fredrikstad 6–1 Odd

== Landsdelsserien 1956/57 ==
=== Group Østland/Søndre ===
Pos	Team	Pld	W	D	L	GF	GA	GD	Pts	Promotion or relegation
1	Eik (P)	14	11	0	3	44	19	+25	22	Promotion to Hovedserien
2	Fram	14	9	3	2	31	14	+17	21	
3	Greåker	14	8	3	3	28	17	+11	19	
4	Moss	14	7	0	7	32	29	+3	14	
5	Lisleby	14	6	0	8	28	36	−8	12	
6	Snøgg (R)	14	4	1	9	24	43	−19	9	Relegation to 3. divisjon
7	Ørn (R)	14	3	2	9	18	33	−15	8	Relegation to 3. divisjon
8	Pors (R)	14	3	1	10	23	37	−14	7	Relegation to 3. divisjon

Source: rsssf.no
Rules for classification: 1) points; 2) goal difference; 3) number of goals scored.
(P) Promoted; (R) Relegated

=== Group Østland/Nordre ===
Pos	Team	Pld	W	D	L	GF	GA	GD	Pts	Promotion or relegation
1	Raufoss (P)	14	9	1	4	38	21	+17	19	Promotion to Hovedserien
2	Kapp	14	8	2	4	44	28	+16	18	
3	Mjøndalen	14	6	4	4	28	21	+7	16	
4	Gjøvik-Lyn	14	7	2	5	25	25	0	16	
5	Lyn	14	5	2	7	27	33	−6	12	
6	Vestfossen	14	5	2	7	19	26	−7	12	
7	Spartacus (R)	14	4	2	8	23	34	−11	10	Relegation to 3. divisjon
8	Hamar (R)	14	1	7	6	23	39	−16	9	Relegation to 3. divisjon

Source: rsssf.no
Rules for classification: 1) points; 2) goal difference; 3) number of goals scored.
(P) Promoted; (R) Relegated

=== Group Sørland/Vestland, A1 ===
Pos	Team	Pld	W	D	L	GF	GA	GD	Pts	Qualification or relegation
1	Donn	12	9	1	2	44	15	+29	19	Qualification for the promotion play-offs
2	Jerv	12	6	2	4	30	25	+5	14	
3	Grane	12	7	0	5	25	24	+1	14	
4	Start	12	6	1	5	38	24	+14	13	
5	Sørfjell	12	6	1	5	40	28	+12	13	
6	Flekkefjord	12	5	1	6	25	30	−5	11	
7	Lyngdal (R)	12	0	0	12	15	71	−56	0	Relegation to 3. divisjon

Source: rsssf.no
Rules for classification: 1) points; 2) goal difference; 3) number of goals scored.
(R) Relegated

=== Group Sørland/Vestland, A2 ===
Pos	Team	Pld	W	D	L	GF	GA	GD	Pts	Qualification or relegation
1	Stavanger	14	10	2	2	32	19	+13	22	Qualification for the promotion play-offs
2	Vard	14	7	1	6	30	26	+4	15	
3	Bryne	14	6	2	6	25	22	+3	14	
4	Jarl	14	5	3	6	22	19	+3	13	
5	Djerv 1919	14	4	5	5	18	20	−2	13	
6	Ulf	14	6	1	7	28	31	−3	13	
7	Nærbø (R)	14	5	2	7	27	36	−9	12	Relegation to 3. divisjon
8	Vidar (R)	14	3	4	7	16	25	−9	10	Relegation to 3. divisjon

Source: rsssf.no
Rules for classification: 1) points; 2) goal difference; 3) number of goals scored.
(R) Relegated

=== Group Sørland/Vestland, B ===
Pos	Team	Pld	W	D	L	GF	GA	GD	Pts	Qualification or relegation
1	Brann (O, P)	12	9	1	2	40	10	+30	19	Qualification for the promotion play-offs
2	Varegg	12	8	2	2	45	19	+26	18	
3	Nordnes	12	6	2	4	19	13	+6	14	
4	Baune	12	6	0	6	28	31	−3	12	
5	Os	12	3	3	6	14	29	−15	9	
6	Hardy	12	3	2	7	14	26	−12	8	
7	Nymark (R)	12	1	2	9	8	40	−32	4	Relegation to 3. divisjon

Source: rsssf.no
Rules for classification: 1) points; 2) goal difference; 3) number of goals scored.
(O) Play-off winners; (P) Promoted; (R) Relegated

=== Group Møre ===
Pos	Team	Pld	W	D	L	GF	GA	GD	Pts	Qualification or relegation
1	Molde (O, P)	14	11	2	1	60	12	+48	24	Qualification for the promotion play-offs
2	Langevåg	14	8	3	3	37	20	+17	19	
3	Kristiansund	14	9	0	5	36	22	+14	18	
4	Hødd	14	7	4	3	33	21	+12	18	
5	Aalesund	14	4	5	5	22	24	−2	13	
6	Braatt	14	4	3	7	30	40	−10	11	
7	Rollon	14	2	3	9	13	52	−39	7	
8	Framtid (R)	14	0	2	12	7	47	−40	2	Relegation to 3. divisjon

Source: rsssf.no
Rules for classification: 1) points; 2) goal difference; 3) number of goals scored.
(O) Play-off winners; (P) Promoted; (R) Relegated

=== Group Trøndelag ===
Pos	Team	Pld	W	D	L	GF	GA	GD	Pts	Qualification or relegation
1	Sverre	14	8	3	3	39	26	+13	19	Qualification for the promotion play-offs
2	Brage	14	6	6	2	36	19	+17	18	
3	Kvik	14	5	7	2	24	15	+9	17	
4	Freidig	14	4	7	3	31	14	+17	15	
5	Nessegutten	14	5	5	4	22	20	+2	15	
6	Stjørdals/Blink	14	5	4	5	20	31	−11	14	
7	Ranheim (R)	14	3	3	8	23	27	−4	9	Relegation to 3. divisjon
8	Troll (R)	14	1	3	10	8	51	−43	5	Relegation to 3. divisjon

Source: rsssf.no
Rules for classification: 1) points; 2) goal difference; 3) number of goals scored.
(R) Relegated

=== Play-off Sørland/Vestland ===
- Stavanger - Donn 4–1
- Brann - Stavanger 4–1

Brann promoted.

=== Play-off Møre/Trøndelag ===
- Molde - Sverre 0–1
- Sverre - Molde 2–5 (agg. 3–5)

Molde promoted.

== First Division 1956/57 ==
=== District I ===
1. Selbak Promoted
2. Sprint/Jeløy
3. Hafslund
4. Kråkerøy
5. Torp
6. Tune
7. Rakkestad
8. Borgen

=== District II, Group A ===
1. Sandaker Play-off
2. Jevnaker
3. Slemmestad
4. Geithus
5. Åssiden
6. Sørli
7. Drafn
8. Solberg

=== District II, Group B ===
1. Aurskog Play-off
2. Bjørkelangen
3. Sagene
4. Grue
5. Røa
6. Grüner
7. Galterud
8. Sand

=== District III, Group A (Oplandene) ===
1. Fremad Play-off
2. Hamarkameratene
3. Brumunddal
4. Vardal
5. Lena
6. Mesna
7. Gjøvik SK
8. Einastrand

=== District III, Group B (Sør-Østerdal) ===
1. Koppang Play-off
2. Nybergsund
3. Lørdalen
4. Ytre Rendal
5. Elverum
6. Innsats
7. Rena

=== District IV, Group A (Vestfold) ===
1. Tønsberg Turn Play-off
2. Runar
3. Holmestrand
4. Tønsbergkam.
5. Sem
6. Teie

=== District IV, Group B (Grenland) ===
1. Urædd Play-off
2. Herkules
3. Storm
4. Kragerø
5. Skiens BK
6. Gjerpen
7. Brevik
8. Borg
9. Skotfoss

=== District IV, Group C (Øvre Telemark) ===
1. Ulefoss Play-off
2. Drangedal
3. Rjukan
4. Skade
5. Gvarv
6. Sportsklubben 31 disqualified

=== District V, Group A1 (Aust-Agder) ===
1. Nedenes Play-off
2. Rygene
3. Trauma
4. Dristug
5. Arendals BK
6. Dølemo withdrew

=== District V, Group A2 (Vest-Agder) ===
1. Lyngdal Play-off
2. Mandalskam.
3. Vigør
4. Vindbjart
5. AIK Lund
6. Farsund

=== District V, Group B1 (Rogaland) ===
1. Egersund Promoted
2. Buøy
3. Varhaug
4. Vaulen
5. Randaberg
6. Ganddal

=== District V, Group B2 (Rogaland) ===
1. Ålgård Promoted
2. Haugar
3. Kopervik
4. Klepp
5. Torvastad
6. Sauda

=== District VI, Group A (Bergen) ===
1. Sandviken Play-off
2. Trane
3. Djerv
4. Fjellkameratene
5. Laksevåg
6. Bergens-Sparta
7. Viggo

=== District VI, Group B (Midthordland) ===
1. Fana Play-off
2. Follese
3. Erdal
4. Voss
5. Ålvik
6. Florvåg
7. Eidsvåg (Åsane)

=== District VII, Group A (Sunnmøre) ===
1. Spjelkavik Play-off
2. Volda
3. Herd
4. Aksla
5. Hovdebygda
6. Velled./Ringen
7. Sykkylven
8. Hareid

=== District VII, Group B (Romsdal) ===
1. Træff Play-off
2. Eidsvåg (Romsdal)
3. Eide
4. Måndalen
5. Isfjorden
6. Kleive withdrew

=== District VII, Group C (Nordmøre) ===
1. Clausenengen Play-off
2. Dahle
3. Nordlandet
4. Sunndal
5. Halsa
6. Goma
7. Bjørn
8. Tingvoll withdrew

=== District VIII, Group A1 (Sør-Trøndelag) ===
1. Flå Play-off
2. Melhus
3. Støren
4. Heimdal
5. Leinstrand
6. Leik

=== District VIII, Group A2 (Sør-Trøndelag) ===
1. Orkanger Play-off
2. Løkken
3. Rindal
4. Svorkmo
5. Meldal
6. Orkdal

=== District VIII, Group B (Trondheim og omegn) ===
1. Rosenborg Play-off
2. Falken
3. National
4. Trond
5. Tryggkameratene
6. Wing
7. Nidelv
8. Nidar

=== District VIII, Group C (Fosen) ===
1. Opphaug Play-off
2. Fevåg
3. Uthaug
4. Lensvik
5. Beian
6. Stadsbygd
7. Bjugn

=== District VIII, Group D (Nord-Trøndelag/Namdal) ===
1. Verdal Play-off
2. Neset
3. Namsos
4. Malm
5. Fram (Skatval)
6. Snåsa
7. Varden (Meråker)
8. Byafossen withdrew

=== District IX ===
1. Bodø/Glimt
2. Brønnøysund
3. Mo
4. Stålkameratene
5. Mosjøen
6. Grand

=== Distrixt X (Unofficial) ===
1. Harstad
2. Mjølner
3. Tromsø
4. Narvik/Nor
5. Finnsnes
6. Fløya

=== Play-off District II ===
Sandaker	2–1	Aurskog

Aurskog	1–1 (agg. 2–3)	Sandaker

Sandaker promoted.

=== Play-off District III ===
Koppang	3–5	Fremad

Fremad	10–0 (agg. 15–3)	Koppang

Fremad promoted.

=== Play-off District IV ===
Ulefoss	2–9	Tønsberg Turn

Urædd	3–1	Ulefoss

Tønsberg Turn	7–2	Urædd

Pos	Team	Pld	W	D	L	GF	GA	GD	Pts	Promotion
1	Tønsberg Turn	2	2	0	0	16	4	+12	4	Promoted
2	Urædd	2	1	0	1	5	8	−3	2	
3	Ulefoss	2	0	0	2	3	12	−9	0	

=== Play-off District V ===
Nedenes	3–7	Lyngdal

Lyngdal	7–2 (agg. 14–5)	Nedenes

Lyngdal promoted.

=== Championship District V ===
Egersund	1–2	Ålgård

Ålgård	3–2 (agg. 5–3)	Egersund

Lyngdal - Ålgård not played

=== Play-off District VI ===
Sandviken	4–1	Fana

Fana	1–3 (agg. 2–7)	Sandviken

Sandviken promoted.

=== Play-off District VII ===
Spjelkavik	2–2	Træff

Clausenengen	2–1	Spjelkavik

Træff	0–3	Clausenengen

Pos	Team	Pld	W	D	L	GF	GA	GD	Pts	Promotion
1	Clausenengen	2	2	0	0	5	1	+4	4	Promoted
2	Spjelkavik	2	0	1	1	3	4	−1	1	Promoted
3	Træff	2	0	1	1	2	5	−3	1	

=== Play-off District VIII ===
Flå - Orkanger ?-?

Orkanger	2–2	Opphaug

Verdal	3–2	Rosenborg

Verdal	0–1	Orkanger

Rosenborg	6–1	Opphaug

Opphaug	1–9	Verdal

Rosenborg	3–0	Orkanger

Pos	Team	Pld	W	D	L	GF	GA	GD	Pts	Promotion
1	Verdal	3	2	0	1	12	4	+8	4	Promoted
2	Rosenborg	3	2	0	1	11	4	+7	4	Promoted
3	Orkanger	3	1	1	1	3	5	−2	3	
4	Opphaug	3	0	1	2	4	17	−13	1	

== National Cup ==
Fredrikstad pulled the double by winning the cup in addition to winning the league. They defeated Sandefjord BK 4-0.

=== Final ===
20 October 1957

Fredrikstad	4–0	Sandefjord BK
Kristoffersen 1', 26'; Johannessen 57'; Borgen 81'	Report

Ullevaal Stadion, Oslo
Attendance: 33,073
Referee: Leif Gulliksen (Ørn)

== Northern Norwegian Cup ==
=== Final ===
Harstad	8–0	Mosjøen
	Report

== National team ==
Date	Venue	Opponent	Res.*	Comp.	Norwegian goalscorers
May 22	Ullevaal Stadion, Oslo	Bulgaria	1-2	WCQ58	Harald Hennum
June 12	Ullevaal Stadion, Oslo	Hungary	2-1	WCQ58	Kjell Kristiansen, Harald Hennum
June 18	Turku, Finland	Sweden	0-0	F	
June 19	Tampere, Finland	Denmark	0-2	F	
July 8	Reykjavík, Iceland	Iceland	3-0	F	Arne Legernes, Kjell Kristiansen, Gunnar Dybwad
September 1	Helsinki, Finland	Finland	4-0	F	Kjell Kristiansen (2), Per Kristoffersen, Harald Hennum
September 22	Ullevaal Stadion, Oslo	Denmark	2-2	F	Per Kristoffersen (2)
October 13	Stockholm, Sweden	Sweden	2-5	F	Gunnar Thoresen, Harald Hennum
November 3	Sofia, Bulgaria	Bulgaria	0-7	WCQ58	
November 10	Budapest, Hungary	Hungary	0-5	WCQ58	

Note: Norway's goals first

Explanation:

- F = Friendly
- WCQ58 = 1958 FIFA World Cup qualifier
