= Iceland national football team results (1940–1959) =

Win Draw Loss

This is a list of the Iceland national football team results from 1946 to 1959. Only games against full national sides are counted.

== 1940s ==
=== 1946 ===
17 July International Friendly	Iceland	0–3	Denmark	Reykjavík, Iceland
20:15 (UTC)		Report	Hansen 5'; Christiansen 72'; Sørensen 74'	Stadium: Melavöllur; Attendance: 8,000; Referee: Thoralf Kristiansen (Norway)

=== 1947 ===
14 July International Friendly	Iceland	2–4	Norway	Reykjavík, Iceland
20:30 (UTC)	Guðmundsson 4', 38'	Report	Brynildsen 6'; Thoresen 23', 29'; Sæthrang 44'	Stadium: Melavöllur; Attendance: 6,000; Referee: Lionel Gibbs (England)

=== 1948 ===
2 July International Friendly	Iceland	2–0	Finland	Reykjavík, Iceland
20:30 (UTC)	Jónsson 85', 88'	Report		Stadium: Melavöllur; Attendance: 8,000; Referee: John Nilsson (Sweden)

=== 1949 ===
2 July International Friendly	Denmark	5–1	Iceland	Aarhus, Denmark
	Lundberg 3'; Hansen 35', 57'; Frandsen 51'; Reckendorff 65'	Report	Halldórsson 79'	Stadium: Aarhus Idrætspark; Attendance: 11,000; Referee: Kolbjørn Dæhlen (Norway)

== 1950s ==
=== 1951 ===
2 June International Friendly	Iceland	4–3	Sweden	Reykjavík, Iceland
21:00 (UTC)	Jónsson 32', 38', 48', 82'	Report	Larsson 55'; Jönsson 62'; Jacobsson 87'	Stadium: Melavöllur; Attendance: 5,634; Referee: Guðjón Einarsson (Iceland)

26 July International Friendly	Norway	3–1	Iceland	Trondheim, Norway
	Hennum 44'; Bjarnason 81' (o.g.); Hvidsten 90'	Report	Jónsson 52'	Stadium: Lerkendal Stadion; Attendance: 17,000; Referee: Helge Andersen (Denmark)

=== 1953 ===
9 August International Friendly	Denmark	4–0	Iceland	Copenhagen, Denmark
13:00 (UTC+1)	Seebach 43', 58'; Nielsen 66'; Hansen 85' (pen.)	Report		Stadium: Parken Stadium; Attendance: 19,800; Referee: John Nilsson (Sweden)

13 August International Friendly	Norway	3–1	Iceland	Bergen, Norway
18:30 (UTC+1)	Kristiansen 8'; Dybwad 15'; Thoresen 23'	Report	Gunnarsson 43'	Stadium: Brann Stadion; Attendance: 12,000; Referee: John Erik Andersson (Sweden)

=== 1954 ===
4 July International Friendly	Iceland	1–0	Norway	Reykjavík, Iceland
20:30 (UTC)	Þórðarson 29'	Report		Stadium: Melavöllur; Attendance: 7,500; Referee: Guðjón Einarsson (Iceland)

24 August International Friendly	Sweden	3–2	Iceland	Kalmar, Sweden
	Eriksson 61', 88'; Sandberg 34'	Report	Þórðarson 61'; Jónsson 78'	Stadium: Fredriksskans; Attendance: 14,066; Referee: Aksel Assmundssen (Denmark)

=== 1955 ===
3 July International Friendly	Iceland	0–4	Denmark	Reykjavík, Iceland
20:00 (UTC)		Report	Jensen 30'; Hansen 37'; Pedersen 50', 74'	Stadium: Melavöllur; Attendance: 10,280; Referee: Petter Gundersen (Norway)

25 August International Friendly	Iceland	3–2	United States	Reykjavík, Iceland
19:30 (UTC)	Þórðarson 61'; Guðmannssson 55', 85'	Report		Stadium: Melavöllur; Attendance: 9,500; Referee: Ludvig Jørkov (Denmark)

=== 1956 ===
29 June International Friendly	Finland	2–1	Iceland	Helsinki, Finland
	Forsgren 11', 68'	Report	Jónsson 12' (pen.)	Stadium: Olympic Stadium; Attendance: 12,108; Referee: Sven Rydberg (Sweden)
