= 1952 Norwegian Football Cup =

Norgesmesterskapet i fotball for menn 1952

Tournament details
- Country: Norway
- Teams: 128 (main competition)

Final positions
- Champions: Sparta (1st title)
- Runners-up: Solberg

The 1952 Norwegian Football Cup was the 47th season of the Norwegian annual knockout football tournament. The tournament was open for all members of NFF, except those from Northern Norway. The final was played at Ullevaal Stadion in Oslo on 26 October 1952, and was contested by Sparta and Solberg, who both made their first appearance in the cup final. Sparta secured their first title with a 3–2 win, having scored all five goals in the final.

== First round ==
Team 1	Score	Team 2
Asker	4–1	Bøverbru
Askim	1–0	Kvik (Halden)
Baune	0–2	Vard
Borg	1–3	Kragerø
Borre	0–5	Fredrikstad
Brage	3–1	Neset
Brann	2–0	Minde
Bryne	1–2	Viking
Djerv	2–2 (a.e.t.)	Nordnes
Djerv 1919	8–0	Odda
Drafn	3–0	Torp
Drammens BK	2–0	Eik
Falken	4–1	Tryggkam
Fremad Lillehammer	0–2 (a.e.t.)	Spartacus
Frigg	3–4	Aurskog
Geithus	2–2 (a.e.t.)	Steinberg
Gjøvik-Lyn	2–1	Aasen
Grane (Arendal)	0–1	Donn
Greåker	1–5	Solberg
Herkules	1–0	Kjelsås
Jarl	4–2 (a.e.t.)	Ålgård
Jerv	3–1	Sørfjell
Jevnaker	1–1 (a.e.t.)	Furuset
Kapp	1–0	Rakkestad
Kongsberg	6–0	Bækkelaget
Kongsvinger	2–4	Hamar
HamKam	9–1	Koppang
Kristiansund	5–4	Goma
Kvik (Trondheim)	3–0	Trond
Langevåg	4–1	Rollon
Larvik Turn	3–1	Runar
Lillestrøm	6–1	Magnor
Lisleby	6–0	Mercantile/Trygg
Liv	0–6	Sandaker
Mandalskameratene	0–3	Flekkefjord
Mjøndalen	2–2 (a.e.t.)	Fram (Larvik)
Molde	5–0	Clausenengen
Moss	6–0	Stag
Nymark	2–2 (a.e.t.)	Os
Odd	2–1	Ulefoss
Ranheim	3–0	Wing
Raufoss	2–2 (a.e.t.)	Strømmen
Sandefjord BK	1–0	Grei
Sarpsborg	5–3	Liull
Skeid	4–1	Bjørkelangen
Skiens-Grane	1–0 (a.e.t.)	Storm
Snøgg	0–1	Vestfossen
Sprint-Jeløy	0–0 (a.e.t.)	Selbak
Stavanger	10–0	Randaberg
Steinkjer	0–4	Nessegutten
Stjørdal	1–5	Freidig
Sverre	3–0	Rosenborg
Tollnes	1–0	Skiens BK
Tønsberg Turn	0–4	Pors
Ulf	1–0	Klepp
Urædd	1–4	Sparta
Vang	0–1	Lyn
Varegg	5–0	Trane
Vigør	0–2	Start
Vålerengen	9–0	Ski
Ørn	0–1	Østsiden
Ørsta	1–2 (a.e.t.)	Hødd
Aalesund	6–1	Træff
Årstad	0–1	Voss
Replay
Fram (Larvik)	3–2	Mjøndalen
Furuset	2–5	Jevnaker
Nordnes	4–5	Djerv
Os	5–0	Nymark
Selbak	3–1	Sprint-Jeløy
Steinberg	0–1	Geithus
Strømmen	1–2	Raufoss

== Second round ==
Team 1	Score	Team 2
Brann	5–1	Stavanger
Donn	0–11	Larvik Turn
Drammens BK	4–0	Asker
Falken	4–2	Ranheim
Flekkefjord	1–3	Jarl
Fram (Larvik)	1–0	Tollnes
Fredrikstad	8–1	Aurskog
Freidig	5–3	Kristiansund
Hamar	1–2	Lillestrøm
HamKam	2–0	Moss
Herkules	1–3 (a.e.t.)	Kragerø
Jevnaker	0–1	Sandefjord BK
Kvik (Trondheim)	7–3	Sverre
Lyn	1–0	Kongsberg
Molde	5–1	Hødd
Nessegutten	1–4	Brage
Pors	3–2	Start
Raufoss	4–0	Drafn
Sandaker	0–3	Lisleby
Selbak	3–1	Gjøvik-Lyn
Skiens-Grane	4–2	Jerv
Solberg	2–0	Odd
Sparta	7–2	Askim
Spartacus	3–1	Sarpsborg
Vard	2–2 (a.e.t.)	Ulf
Varegg	3–1	Djerv
Vestfossen	0–1	Skeid
Viking	2–2 (a.e.t.)	Djerv 1919
Voss	3–0	Os
Vålerengen	3–2	Geithus
Østsiden	1–2	Kapp
Aalesund	3–1	Langevåg
Replay
Djerv 1919	1–0	Viking
Ulf	2–0	Vard

== Third round ==
Team 1	Score	Team 2
27 July 1952
Sparta	1–0	Fram (Larvik)
Lisleby	1–3 (a.e.t.)	Raufoss
Skeid	3–0	Skiens-Grane
Lillestrøm	4–1	Falken
Kapp	3–1	Fredrikstad
Solberg	2–2 (a.e.t.)	Selbak
Larvik Turn	1–0	Kragerø
Pors	4–1	Lyn
Ulf	3–1	Sandefjord BK
Jarl	1–8	Brann
Djerv 1919	7–2	Voss
Varegg	2–3	Spartacus
Aalesund	1–4	Kvik (Trondheim)
Freidig	7–2	Molde
Brage	5–2	HamKam
Vålerengen	1–4	Drammens BK
Replay: 17 August 1952
Selbak	1–3	Solberg

== Fourth round ==
Team 1	Score	Team 2
17 August 1952
Spartacus	2–3	Sparta
Brann	5–0	Djerv 1919
Lillestrøm	4–0	Ulf
Kvik (Trondheim)	2–1	Brage
Raufoss	3–1	Skeid
Larvik Turn	3–0	Drammens BK
Pors	0–1	Kapp
31 August 1952
Freidig	1–2	Solberg

== Quarter-finals ==
Team 1	Score	Team 2
21 September 1952
Larvik Turn	3–1	Lillestrøm
Brann	0–0 (a.e.t.)	Kvik (Trondheim)
Solberg	2–1	Raufoss
Kapp	1–3	Sparta
Replay: 28 September 1952
Kvik (Trondheim)	2–4	Brann

== Semi-finals ==
Team 1	Score	Team 2
12 October 1952
Brann	1–2	Solberg
Sparta	2–1	Larvik Turn

== Final ==
26 October 1952

Sparta	3–2	Solberg
K. Sørensen 78' (pen.), 84'; O. Sørensen 89'	Report	Pedersen 10' (o.g.); Svendsen 34' (o.g.)

Ullevaal Stadion, Oslo
Attendance: 30,639
Referee: Helge Ladim (Grüner)

== See also ==
- 1951–52 Norwegian Main League
- 1952 in Norwegian football
