= Sparta Sarpsborg (disambiguation) =

IK Sparta Sarpsborg, formerly known as the Sparta Warriors, is the ice hockey department of IL Sparta.

This may also refer to:

- IL Sparta, a sports club from Sarpsborg
- FK Sparta Sarpsborg (2004–2007), the predecessor of Sarpsborg 08 FF
- FK Sparta Sarpsborg, the football department of IL Sparta
