= 1957 Norwegian Football Cup =

Norgesmesterskapet i fotball for menn 1957

Tournament details
- Country: Norway
- Teams: 128 (main competition)

Final positions
- Champions: Fredrikstad (7th title)
- Runners-up: Sandefjord BK

The 1957 Norwegian Football Cup was the 52nd season of the Norwegian annual knockout football tournament. The tournament was open for all members of NFF, except those from Northern Norway. The final was played at Ullevaal Stadion in Oslo on 20 October 1957, and was contested by the six-times winners Fredrikstad, and Sandefjord BK who made their debut in the Norwegian Cup final.

Fredrikstad won their seventh title with a 4–0 win in the final, which also secured the double for Fredrikstad, as they also won the 1956–57 Norwegian Main League. This was Fredrikstad's second double, they won the first in 1938. Skeid was the defending champions, but lost 3–0 against Sarpsborg in the quarterfinal and was eliminated.

== First round ==
Team 1	Score	Team 2
Aurskog	5–1	Kongsvinger
Bjørkelangen	0–1	Spartacus
Braatt	1–2	Molde
Brage	5–0	Nessegutten
Brumunddal	1–4	Skeid
Buøy	1–2	Djerv 1919
Bækkelaget	3–1	Sagene
Donn	4–2	Sørfjell
Drammens BK	4–0	Tønsberg Turn
Eik	5–1	Gjerpen
Falk	1–2	Larvik Turn
Flekkefjord	0–2	Egersund
Fram (Larvik)	1–3	Herkules
Framtid	1–2	Kristiansund
Fredrikstad	7–1	Askim
Fremad Lillehammer	8–0	Gjøvik SK
Fåvang	1–2 (a.e.t.)	HamKam
Geithus	2–3	Asker
Gjøvik-Lyn	3–0	Lena
Grane (Arendal)	5–0	Storm
Hamar	8–2	Vardal
Holmestrand	1–3	Snøgg
Hødd	6–1	Rollon
Jarl	2–2 (a.e.t.)	Årstad
Jerv	2–3	Start
Jotun	2–2 (a.e.t.)	Nordnes
Kapp	4–1	Einastrand
Kråkerøy	1–3	Lisleby
Kvik (Halden)	0–6	Sarpsborg
Kvik (Trondheim)	3–0	Flå
Langesund	1–1 (a.e.t.)	Ulefoss
Langevåg	4–1	Clausenengen
Liull	1–3	Lillestrøm
Lyn	3–1	Sprint-Jeløy
Mjøndalen	2–0	Sem
Moss	0–1	Selbak
Nymark	1–0	Baune
Nærbø	1–0	Bryne
Odd	6–2	Brevik
Os	2–1	Hardy
Pors	10–0	Risør
Ranheim	4–0	Orkanger
Raufoss	2–0	Sand
Rjukan	1–3	Ørn
Runar	1–3	Sandefjord BK
Sandaker	1–0	Gamlebyen
Ski	1–6	Greåker
Slemmestad	2–0	Frigg
Sparta	0–1	Borgen Sarpsborg
Stavanger	4–2	Vidar
Steinkjer	2–3	Verdal
Strømmen	4–0	Sørli
Sverre	3–3 (a.e.t.)	Stjørdals-Blink
Søndre Høland	2–4 (a.e.t.)	Rapid
Trane	0–7	Brann
Troll	3–1	Løkken
Tynset	3–1	Freidig
Ulf	0–2	Viking
Urædd	2–1	Drangedal
Vard	3–1	Kopervik
Varegg	5–1	Sandviken
Vestfossen	3–1	Fossekallen
Vålerengen	4–0	Bjølsen
Aalesund	1–2 (a.e.t.)	Eid
Replay
Nordnes	4–3	Jotun
Stjørdals-Blink	3–3 (a.e.t.)	Sverre
Ulefoss	0–2	Langesund
Årstad	4–0	Jarl
2nd replay
Sverre	3–4	Stjørdals-Blink

== Second round ==
Team 1	Score	Team 2
Asker	3–1	Hamar
Borgen Sarpsborg	0–1	Lyn
Brage	5–2	Fremad Lillehammer
Brann	2–0	Nordnes
Djerv 1919	2–1 (a.e.t.)	Nærbø
Egersund	2–2 (a.e.t.)	Viking
Eid	3–6	Hødd
Greåker	3–1	Sandaker
HamKam	0–1	Vålerengen
Herkules	0–4	Fredrikstad
Kristiansund	3–3 (a.e.t.)	Langevåg
Langesund	0–2	Odd
Larvik Turn	2–0	Pors
Lillestrøm	2–2 (a.e.t.)	Gjøvik-Lyn
Lisleby	6–0	Aurskog
Molde	5–1	Troll
Os	1–1 (a.e.t.)	Vard
Rapid	4–1	Slemmestad
Raufoss	3–1	Tynset
Sandefjord BK	3–0	Drammens BK
Sarpsborg	5–0	Bækkelaget
Selbak	3–1	Eik
Skeid	2–0	Vestfossen
Snøgg	1–3 (a.e.t.)	Mjøndalen
Spartacus	1–6	Strømmen
Start	0–3	Grane (Arendal)
Stjørdals-Blink	1–2	Ranheim
Urædd	2–0	Donn
Varegg	1–0	Nymark
Verdal	2–2 (a.e.t.)	Kvik (Trondheim)
Ørn	2–3	Kapp
Årstad	6–3 (a.e.t.)	Stavanger
Replay
Gjøvik-Lyn	2–1	Lillestrøm
Kvik (Trondheim)	6–1	Verdal
Langevåg	1–2	Kristiansund
Vard	2–3	Os
Viking	5–0	Egersund

== Third round ==
Team 1	Score	Team 2
4 August 1957
Fredrikstad	3–2 (a.e.t.)	Brage
Rapid	0–1	Larvik Turn
Lyn	3–9	Asker
Vålerengen	5–2	Os
Strømmen	8–2	Urædd
Odd	4–1	Selbak
Grane (Arendal)	1–3	Skeid
Hødd	0–3	Raufoss
Kvik (Trondheim)	3–1	Kristiansund
Ranheim	3–1	Greåker
Gjøvik-Lyn	5–2	Molde
Kapp	2–2 (a.e.t.)	Sarpsborg
Mjøndalen	3–1	Årstad
Sandefjord BK	7–0	Lisleby
Viking	3–0	Varegg
Brann	4–1	Djerv 1919
Replay: 7 August 1957
Sarpsborg	4–3	Kapp

== Fourth round ==
Team 1	Score	Team 2
18 August 1957
Sarpsborg	4–0	Brann
Fredrikstad	4–1	Vålerengen
Skeid	5–1	Gjøvik-Lyn
Asker	2–0	Odd
Raufoss	1–2	Sandefjord BK
Larvik Turn	13–0	Ranheim
Viking	7–1	Mjøndalen
Kvik (Trondheim)	3–8	Strømmen

== Quarter-finals ==
Team 1	Score	Team 2
8 September 1957
Strømmen	2–0	Larvik Turn
Asker	2–4	Fredrikstad
Sandefjord BK	3–2 (a.e.t.)	Viking
Sarpsborg	3–0	Skeid

== Semi-finals ==
Team 1	Score	Team 2
6 October 1957
Sandefjord BK	4–1	Strømmen
Fredrikstad	3–0	Sarpsborg

== Final ==
20 October 1957

Fredrikstad	4–0	Sandefjord BK
Kristoffersen 1', 26'; Johannessen 57'; Borgen 81'	Report

Ullevaal Stadion, Oslo
Attendance: 33,073
Referee: Leif Gulliksen (Ørn)

== See also ==
- 1956–57 Norwegian Main League
- 1957 in Norwegian football
