= Forli (disambiguation) =

Forlì is a comune and city in Italy.

Forli or Forlì may also refer to:

- Forli (horse), a racehorse
- Forlì del Sannio, Molise, Italy
- Forlì F.C., an Italian football club
- 36th Infantry Division Forlì, of the Italian Army
- Olav Førli (1920–2011), Norwegian football goalkeeper
