= Ken Bjørntvedt Olsen =

Norwegian footballer (born 1967)

Personal information
- Date of birth: 1 October 1967 (age 59)
- Height: 1.75 m (5 ft 9 in)
- Position: Forward

Senior career*
Years	Team	Apps	(Gls)
- Sandefjord BK
–1989	Vejle		
1989–1991	Sandefjord BK		
1992	Lyn	21	(4)
1993–1998	Sandefjord BK		
1999–2000	Sandefjord Fotball		
- * Club domestic league appearances and goals

Ken Bjørntvedt Olsen (born 1 October 1967) is a retired Norwegian footballer who played as a forward. Spending most of his career in Sandefjord, he played in the Danish Superliga for Vejle BK and Eliteserien for Lyn.

== Career ==
Starting his career in Sandefjord BK, he hada a spell in Danish Vejle BK in 1989. Here, he scored in the Intertoto Cup, and played together with Preben Elkjær.

During the summer of 1989, he participated on a Sandefjord city selection team that faced Manchester City in a friendly match. Olsen recorded one assist in a 2–3 loss. It also transpired that he rejoined Sandefjord. During the second half of 1989, Olsen was instrumental in Sandefjord securing promotion to the second tier. However, he was contacted by Frigg and signed a contract with them, before attempting to annul the contract.

Olsen stayed in Sandefjord, but as the team were relegated in 1991, Olsen jumped on an opportunity to sign for another Oslo club, Lyn, playing on the highest tier. His first Eliteserien goal came in July 1992, being Lyn's only goal in a 1–3 loss to Rosenborg. The goal had little practical bearing, except for a Swedish man who won 19,699,020 kr from Måltipset because of that exact goal. Olsen's second goal was more important for Lyn, coming in a 3–2 victory over Kongsvinger.

He returned to Sandefjord in 1993. In 1994, Olsen again helped Sandefjord win promotion to the second tier, as he scored to secure one point against Aurskog-Finstadbru. He finished his career there after Sandefjord BK was merged to form Sandefjord Fotball.

== Personal life ==
His son Anders Bjørntvedt Olsen also played for Sandefjord BK and Lyn. His son Henrik played handball for Sandefjord.
