= 1954–55 Norwegian Main League =

11th season of top-tier football league in Norway

Hovedserien
- Season: 1954–55
- Champions: Larvik Turn; 2nd title
- Relegated: Fram Larvik; Sparta; Strømmen; Freidig

The 1954–55 Hovedserien was the 11th completed season of top division football in Norway.

== Overview ==
It was contested by 16 teams, and Larvik Turn won the championship, their second league title.

== Teams and locations ==
Note: Table lists in alphabetical order.

Group A
Team	Ap.	Location
Brann	8	Bergen
Fram Larvik	6	Larvik
Fredrikstad	10	Fredrikstad
Lillestrøm	5	Lillestrøm
Odd	8	Skien
Sparta	8	Sarpsborg
Vålerengen	8	Oslo
Viking	10	Stavanger

Group B
Team	Ap.	Location
Asker	4	Asker
Freidig	4	Trondheim
Larvik Turn	6	Larvik
Ranheim	6	Trondheim
Sandefjord BK	9	Sandefjord
Sarpsborg FK	10	Sarpsborg
Skeid	9	Oslo
Strømmen	6	Strømmen

== League tables ==
=== Group A ===
Pos	Team	Pld	W	D	L	GF	GA	GD	Pts	Qualification or relegation
1	Fredrikstad	14	7	5	2	43	24	+19	19	Qualification for the championship final
2	Viking	14	6	3	5	23	24	−1	15	
3	Odd	14	6	3	5	20	25	−5	15	
4	Vålerengen	14	4	6	4	22	21	+1	14	
5	Brann	14	5	4	5	23	24	−1	14	
6	Lillestrøm	14	6	2	6	27	30	−3	14	
7	Fram Larvik (R)	14	6	1	7	21	24	−3	13	Relegation
8	Sparta (R)	14	1	6	7	21	28	−7	8	Relegation

Source: RSSSF
(R) Relegated

=== Group B ===
Pos	Team	Pld	W	D	L	GF	GA	GD	Pts	Qualification or relegation
1	Larvik Turn (C)	14	10	1	3	40	16	+24	21	Qualification for the championship final
2	Skeid	14	9	1	4	34	22	+12	19	
3	Sandefjord BK	14	8	3	3	26	23	+3	19	
4	Asker	14	7	2	5	27	20	+7	16	
5	Sarpsborg FK	14	5	4	5	27	33	−6	14	
6	Ranheim	14	4	2	8	20	29	−9	10	
7	Strømmen (R)	14	2	3	9	22	27	−5	7	Relegation
8	Freidig (R)	14	2	2	10	13	39	−26	6	Relegation

Source: RSSSF
(C) Champions; (R) Relegated

== Results ==
=== Group A ===
Home \ Away	SKB	FRA	FFK	LIL	ODD	SPA	VIF	VIK
Brann		2–1	2–4	2–0	0–1	2–1	3–1	1–1
Fram Larvik	0–2		1–3	2–4	3–1	1–0	0–0	2–0
Fredrikstad	1–1	3–1		6–3	4–1	1–1	2–4	5–1
Lillestrøm	6–2	2–1	1–7		4–1	0–0	0–2	1–0
Odd	1–1	3–0	1–0	2–0		3–2	1–1	1–3
Sparta	4–3	3–4	3–3	1–3	1–1		0–0	1–2
Vålerengen	0–0	0–2	3–3	2–2	5–0	3–2		1–2
Viking	3–2	1–3	1–1	2–1	1–3	2–2	4–0	

Source: NIFS.no
Legend: Blue = home team win; Yellow = draw; Red = away team win.

=== Group B ===
Home \ Away	ASK	FRE	LAR	RAN	SBK	SAR	SKD	STR
Asker		5–0	1–0	2–1	1–2	5–2	1–0	2–1
Freidig	0–4		1–7	1–0	2–3	2–5	1–3	0–1
Larvik Turn	3–0	5–1		1–0	5–0	1–1	3–0	3–1
Ranheim	1–0	1–1	3–4		1–1	5–1	1–7	3–2
Sandefjord BK	3–1	2–1	0–2	1–0		3–2	4–2	1–1
Sarpsborg FK	3–1	0–0	3–2	3–2	1–1		5–3	1–1
Skeid	2–2	1–0	4–2	4–0	3–1	1–0		3–2
Strømmen	2–2	2–3	1–2	1–2	1–4	6–0	0–1	

Source: NIFS.no
Legend: Blue = home team win; Yellow = draw; Red = away team win.

== Championship final ==
- Larvik Turn 4–2 Fredrikstad
