= Asbjørn Hansen =

Norwegian footballer (1930-2017)

Personal information
- Full name: Asbjørn Hansen
- Date of birth: 29 May 1930
- Place of birth: Sarpsborg, Norway
- Date of death: 25 March 2017 (aged 86)
- Place of death: Sarpsborg, Norway
- Position: Goalkeeper

Senior career*
Years	Team	Apps	(Gls)
1948–1958	Sparta		
1958–1962	Sarpsborg		

International career
1952–1961	Norway	52	(0)
- * Club domestic league appearances and goals

Asbjørn Hansen (29 May 1930 – 25 March 2017) was a Norwegian football goalkeeper who played for Sparta and Sarpsborg. He is regarded as one of Norway's best goalkeepers of all time, and was first-choice goalkeeper for the Norway national team through most of the 1950s.

Hansen made his senior debut for Sparta in 1948, and was a member of the Sparta team that won the Norwegian Football Cup in 1952. At the time of his death, he was the last surviving member from the cup-winning team. In 1958, following Sparta's relegation from the Norwegian Main League the previous year, Hansen joined city rivals Sarpsborg FK, where he played until his retirement from top-level football in 1962.

on 25 June 1952, Hansen made his debut for the Norwegian national team in a friendly against Yugoslavia, and he remained first-choice goalkeeper throughout most of the next decade, playing his last international in 1961. In total, he won 52 caps for Norway. Only Erik Thorstvedt (97 caps), Rune Jarstein (65 caps as of February 2020) and Thomas Myhre (56 caps) have played more matches for Norway as goalkeeper.
