= Willy Olsen (footballer) =

Norwegian footballer (1921-1995)

Personal information
- Date of birth: 25 January 1921
- Date of death: 14 September 1995 (aged 74)

International career
Years	Team	Apps	(Gls)
1949–1956	Norway	10	(1)

Willy Olsen (25 January 1921 – 14 September 1995) was a Norwegian footballer. He played in ten matches for the Norway national football team from 1949 to 1956. He was also named in Norway's squad for the Group 1 qualification tournament for the 1954 FIFA World Cup.
