= Asbjørn Andersen (footballer) =

Norwegian footballer (1922-1970)

Personal information
- Full name: Asbjørn Adelsten Andersen
- Date of birth: 31 December 1922
- Place of birth: Oslo, Norway
- Date of death: 20 December 1970 (aged 47)
- Place of death: Oslo, Norway
- Position: Forward

Senior career*
Years	Team	Apps	(Gls)
1945–1949	Strong		
1950–1956	Vålerenga		

International career
1953	Norway	1	(0)
- * Club domestic league appearances and goals

Asbjørn Andersen (31 December 1922 – 20 December 1970) was a Norwegian footballer. He played in one match for the Norway national football team in 1953. He was also named in Norway's squad for the Group 1 qualification tournament for the 1954 FIFA World Cup.

On club level, Andersen spent seven years in the Norwegian Main League playing as a forward for Vålerenga, having previously played for Strong. His son Yngve Andersen also became a footballer, who played 14 seasons for Vålerenga as a midfielder, gaining a reputation as one of the "hardest" players in the club's history.
