= Erik Holmberg (footballer) =

Norwegian footballer (1922-1998)

Personal information
- Full name: Erik Holmberg
- Date of birth: 23 May 1922
- Place of birth: Fredrikstad, Norway
- Date of death: 18 September 1998 (aged 76)
- Place of death: Fredrikstad, Norway
- Position: Defender

Senior career*
| Years | Team | Apps | (Gls) |
| 1945–56 | Fredrikstad | | |

International career
| 1946–53 | Norway | 27 | (0) |

Managerial career
- 1956–57: Fredrikstad
- 1962: Fredrikstad
- 1965: Fredrikstad
- 1966–68: Østsiden
- * Club domestic league appearances and goals

Erik Holmberg (23 May 1922 – 18 September 1998) was a Norwegian international football defender. He played his entire career at Fredrikstad FK, and won the Norwegian Cup in 1950 and the Hovedserien four times (in 1948–49, 1950–51, 1951–52 and 1953–54). He was capped 27 times for Norway, and participated at the Helsinki Olympics in 1952. After his retirement he was the head coach of Fredrikstad from 1956 to 1957, and Østsiden from 1966 to 1968.
