= Ragnar Hvidsten =

Norwegian footballer (1926–2016)

Personal information
- Full name: Ragnar Hvidsten
- Date of birth: 3 December 1926
- Place of birth: Sandar Municipality, Norway
- Date of death: 21 September 2016 (aged 89)
- Place of death: Sandefjord Municipality, Norway
- Position: Inside forward

Senior career*
Years	Team	Apps	(Gls)
	Runar	?	(?)
1949–1952	Sandefjord	24	(4)
1952–1953	Skeid	20	(8)
1953–1959	Sandefjord	69	(7)
1955	→ Hendon (loan)	3	(1)

International career
1950–1955	Norway	21	(2)
- * Club domestic league appearances and goals

Ragnar Hvidsten (3 December 1926 – 21 September 2016) was a Norwegian footballer. He played as an inside forward for Sandefjord and Skeid in Hovedserien, and was capped 21 times for the Norwegian national team, scoring two goals.

== Career ==
Hvidsten was born in Sandar Municipality and started his career for the local club Runar where he played 171 matches (a number which includes cup matches and friendlies). He joined Sandefjord BK ahead of the 1949–50 season where he played 26 matches and scored three goals for the team in Hovedserien before he joined Skeid in the middle of the 1951–52 season. Hvidtsten scored eight goals in 20 matches for Skeid, before he returned to Sandefjord BK after one and a half season. Hvidsten played 69 matches and scored seven goals for Sandefjord BK until he retired in 1959. However, Hvidsten had a spell at the English amateur club Hendon in 1955, and played for the team in the 1955 FA Amateur Cup final, and became the first Norwegian to do so. Hvidsten later also played in the Norwegian Football Cup final, when Sandefjord BK was beaten 4–0 against Fredrikstad in 1957.

== International career ==
Hvidsten made his national team debut for Norway in a friendly match against Yugoslavia on 5 November 1950. He scored his first goal for Norway against Ireland on 30 May 1951, which was his fourth international match. In July the same year against Iceland, Hvidsten scored his second and last international goal. Together with his teammate in Sandefjord BK, Thorbjørn Svenssen, Hvidsten was selected for the Norwegian squad who competed at the 1952 Summer Olympics in Finland. He earned his last cap in a Nordic championship against Sweden in September 1955. In total, Hvidsten was capped 21 times for Norway, while FIFA only recognize 19 of those as full international matches. He died at the age of 89 on 21 September 2016.
