= Karl-Heinz Metzner =

German footballer (1923–1994)

Personal information
- Full name: Karl-Heinz Metzner
- Date of birth: 9 January 1923
- Place of birth: Kassel, Germany
- Date of death: 25 October 1994 (aged 71)
- Position: Midfielder

Senior career*
Years	Team	Apps	(Gls)
1943–1944	Borussia Fulda		
1949–1961	Hessen Kassel		

International career
1952–1953	West Germany	2	(0)
Medal record
Representing West Germany
FIFA World Cup
Winner	1954 Switzerland
- * Club domestic league appearances and goals

Karl-Heinz "Gala" Metzner (9 January 1923 – 25 October 1994) was a German footballer. He was born in Kassel.

He was part of the West German team that won the 1954 FIFA World Cup. In total he earned two caps for West Germany. During his club career he played for Hessen Kassel.

Already at the age of 17, Metzner took part in an instruction training of the Germany national team, however World War II stopped Metzner's aspirations; Metzner had to serve in the war where he received a hand injury, which handicapped him throughout the rest of his life. After the war, Metzner played for Hessen Kassel as an inside forward and as a half back. He was first called up by West German coach Sepp Herberger for a 1952 international friendly against Yugoslavia, where he did not play. His international debut came a week later in the game against Spain in Madrid. Although he was a member of the 1954 FIFA World Cup German squad, Metzner could not break into the starting eleven, neither as a half back nor as an inside forward, as the half backs Horst Eckel and Karl Mai and the inside forwards Max Morlock and Fritz Walter were too strong.

Metzner ended his career on 5 August 1961, in a friendly game between Kassel and Radnički Belgrade. He played 620 times for Hessen Kassel. Metzner died of heart failure in 1994.
