= Knut Dahlen =

Norwegian footballer (1922–1999)

Personal information
- Date of birth: 28 September 1922
- Place of birth: Raufoss, Norway
- Date of death: 18 March 1999 (aged 76)
- Position: Forward

International career
Years	Team	Apps	(Gls)
1946–1953	Norway	4	(2)

Knut Dahlen (28 September 1922 – 18 March 1999) was a Norwegian footballer. He played in four matches for the Norway national football team from 1946 to 1953. He was also named in Norway's squad for the Group 1 qualification tournament for the 1954 FIFA World Cup.
