= 1950–51 Norwegian Main League =

7th season of top-tier football league in Norway

Hovedserien
- Season: 1950–51
- Champions: Fredrikstad; 4th title
- Relegated: Lisleby; Fram Larvik; Selbak; Kristiansund FK

The 1950–51 Hovedserien was the 7th completed season of top division football in Norway.

== Overview ==
It was contested by 16 teams, and Fredrikstad FK won the championship.

== Teams and locations ==
Note: Table lists in alphabetical order.

Group A
Team	Ap.	Location
Brann	5	Bergen
Fram	5	Larvik
Fredrikstad	6	Fredrikstad
Lisleby	4	Fredrikstad
Sandefjord BK	5	Sandefjord
Strømmen	2	Strømmen
Vålerengen	6	Oslo
Viking	6	Stavanger

Group B
Team	Ap.	Location
Kristiansund FK	4	Kristiansund
Lyn	6	Oslo
Odd	4	Skien
Ørn	6	Horten
Sarpsborg FK	6	Sarpsborg
Selbak	4	Fredrikstad
Skeid	5	Oslo
Sparta	4	Sarpsborg

== League tables ==
=== Group A ===
Pos	Team	Pld	W	D	L	GF	GA	GD	Pts	Qualification or relegation
1	Fredrikstad (C)	14	10	3	1	44	14	+30	23	Qualification for the championship final
2	Vålerengen	14	7	5	2	35	21	+14	19	
3	Sandefjord BK	14	5	4	5	24	23	+1	14	
4	Viking	14	5	4	5	19	18	+1	14	
5	Brann	14	5	3	6	24	30	−6	13	
6	Strømmen	14	5	3	6	22	29	−7	13	
7	Lisleby (R)	14	3	3	8	21	35	−14	9	Relegation
8	Fram Larvik (R)	14	2	3	9	14	33	−19	7	Relegation

Source: RSSSF
(C) Champions; (R) Relegated

=== Group B ===
Pos	Team	Pld	W	D	L	GF	GA	GD	Pts	Qualification or relegation
1	Odd	14	7	6	1	31	13	+18	20	Qualification for the championship final
2	Lyn	14	6	7	1	41	18	+23	19	
3	Sparta	14	6	4	4	19	16	+3	16	
4	Skeid	14	6	4	4	29	28	+1	16	
5	Sarpsborg	14	4	5	5	20	21	−1	13	
6	Ørn	14	5	3	6	23	25	−2	13	
7	Selbak (R)	14	3	5	6	22	25	−3	11	Relegation
8	Kristiansund (R)	14	1	2	11	16	55	−39	4	Relegation

Source: RSSSF
(R) Relegated

== Results ==
=== Group A ===
Home \ Away	SKB	FRA	FFK	LIS	SBK	STR	VIK	VIF
Brann		3–4	4–3	3–3	1–1	2–1	3–1	1–2
Fram Larvik	1–2		0–5	1–2	0–1	0–3	0–2	1–1
Fredrikstad	4–0	1–1		4–2	2–1	5–0	3–0	3–3
Lisleby	1–2	2–2	1–2		2–1	2–3	0–2	3–5
Sandefjord BK	5–1	0–2	0–5	1–1		2–2	0–0	5–3
Strømmen	3–2	4–0	1–1	1–0	1–4		0–1	2–2
Viking	0–0	4–1	1–4	0–2	2–3	4–0		0–0
Vålerengen	1–0	3–1	0–2	8–0	1–0	4–1	2–2	

Source: NIFS.no
Legend: Blue = home team win; Yellow = draw; Red = away team win.

=== Group B ===
Home \ Away	KRI	LYN	ODD	ØRN	SAR	SEL	SKD	SPA
Kristiansund		2–14	3–3	2–3	0–2	3–1	0–2	0–1
Lyn	3–1		0–0	1–1	2–2	4–1	3–3	2–0
Odd	3–0	1–1		2–0	6–1	3–2	5–2	0–0
Ørn	3–1	1–3	0–2		0–3	4–1	5–1	3–0
Sarpsborg FK	4–0	1–1	0–3	1–1		3–1	1–2	0–0
Selbak	8–3	0–0	0–0	3–1	1–1		3–1	1–2
Skeid	1–1	3–6	1–1	4–0	3–1	0–0		3–1
Sparta	7–0	2–1	3–2	1–1	1–0	0–0	1–3	

Source: NIFS.no
Legend: Blue = home team win; Yellow = draw; Red = away team win.

== Championship final ==
- Odd 1–3 Fredrikstad FK
- Fredrikstad FK 4–2 Odd

Fredrikstad won 7–2 on aggregate.
