= Yngve Karlsen =

Norwegian footballer (1930-2010)

Personal information
- Date of birth: 28 February 1930
- Date of death: 5 October 2010 (aged 80)

International career
| Years | Team | Apps | (Gls) |
| 1953–1957 | Norway | 3 | (0) |

Yngve Karlsen (28 February 1930 – 5 October 2010) was a Norwegian footballer. He played in three matches for the Norway national football team from 1953 to 1957. He was also named in Norway's squad for the Group 1 qualification tournament for the 1954 FIFA World Cup.
