= Nick Sandberg =

Norwegian footballer (born 1958)

Personal information
- Date of birth: 17 October 1958 (age 68)

International career
Years	Team	Apps	(Gls)
1983	Norway	1	(0)

Nick Sandberg (born 17 October 1958) is a Norwegian footballer. He played in one match for the Norway national football team in 1983.
