= 1951–52 Norwegian Main League =

8th season of top-tier football league in Norway

Hovedserien
- Season: 1951–52
- Champions: Fredrikstad; 5th title
- Relegated: Vålerengen; Ørn; Kvik (Trondheim); Snøgg

The 1951–52 Hovedserien was the 8th completed season of top division football in Norway.

== Overview ==
It was contested by 16 teams, and Fredrikstad FK won the championship.

== Teams and locations ==
Note: Table lists in alphabetical order.

Group A
Team	Ap.	Location
Årstad	4	Bergen
Asker	1	Asker
Brann	6	Bergen
Odd	5	Skien
Ørn	7	Horten
Skeid	6	Oslo
Vålerengen	7	Oslo
Viking	7	Stavanger

Group B
Team	Ap.	Location
Fredrikstad	7	Fredrikstad
Kvik	2	Trondheim
Lyn	7	Oslo
Sandefjord BK	6	Sandefjord
Sarpsborg FK	7	Sarpsborg
Snøgg	4	Notodden
Sparta	5	Sarpsborg
Strømmen	3	Strømmen

== League tables ==
=== Group A ===
Pos	Team	Pld	W	D	L	GF	GA	GD	Pts	Qualification or relegation
1	Brann	14	8	1	5	27	21	+6	17	Qualification for the championship final
2	Skeid	14	6	3	5	33	19	+14	15	
3	Odd	14	7	1	6	30	23	+7	15	
4	Viking	14	5	5	4	21	19	+2	15	
5	Asker	14	6	2	6	27	23	+4	14	
6	Årstad	14	5	4	5	22	35	−13	14	
7	Vålerengen (R)	14	5	3	6	25	22	+3	13	Relegation
8	Ørn (R)	14	2	5	7	21	44	−23	9	Relegation

Source: RSSSF
(R) Relegated

=== Group B ===
Pos	Team	Pld	W	D	L	GF	GA	GD	Pts	Qualification or relegation
1	Fredrikstad (C)	14	12	2	0	41	16	+25	26	Qualification for the championship final
2	Sarpsborg	14	8	1	5	22	15	+7	17	
3	Sparta	14	5	4	5	18	18	0	14	
4	Lyn	14	5	4	5	19	20	−1	14	
5	Sandefjord	14	5	3	6	16	19	−3	13	
6	Strømmen	14	5	2	7	25	23	+2	12	
7	Kvik (Trondheim) (R)	14	5	2	7	23	25	−2	12	Relegation
8	Snøgg (R)	14	0	4	10	9	37	−28	4	Relegation

Source: RSSSF
(C) Champions; (R) Relegated

== Results ==
=== Group A ===
Home \ Away	ÅRS	ASK	SKB	ODD	ØRN	SKD	VIF	VIK
Årstad		1–5	0–6	1–0	3–3	1–0	4–1	3–1
Asker	0–0		0–1	3–2	6–0	2–1	0–1	0–1
Brann	1–0	0–1		0–2	3–1	0–3	5–1	4–2
Odd	4–1	6–2	1–3		3–4	3–1	2–3	2–1
Ørn	3–3	0–4	2–2	1–2		1–6	2–1	1–1
Skeid	3–4	2–2	5–0	0–2	4–2		3–0	1–1
Vålerengen	7–0	5–0	1–2	2–0	1–1	1–1		1–2
Viking	1–1	3–2	2–0	1–1	5–0	0–3	0–0	

Source: NIFS.no
Legend: Blue = home team win; Yellow = draw; Red = away team win.

=== Group B ===
Home \ Away	FFK	KVI	LYN	SBK	SAR	SNØ	SPA	STR
Fredrikstad		3–2	3–2	3–3	1–0	4–1	3–1	4–2
Kvik	1–4		1–1	2–1	1–0	4–0	1–1	1–2
Lyn	2–2	3–1		0–2	2–1	1–1	0–1	3–5
Sandefjord BK	0–1	0–1	1–1		1–3	2–1	2–1	2–1
Sarpsborg FK	0–3	2–1	0–1	2–0		3–1	2–1	2–1
Snøgg	1–4	2–6	0–1	0–0	0–4		1–1	0–5
Sparta	0–3	4–0	1–0	1–2	1–1	2–1		3–2
Strømmen	1–3	2–1	1–2	2–0	1–2	0–0	0–0	

Source: NIFS.no
Legend: Blue = home team win; Yellow = draw; Red = away team win.

== Championship final ==
- Fredrikstad FK 3–1 Brann
