= Richard Gottinger =

German footballer

Personal information
- Full name: Richard Gottinger
- Date of birth: 4 June 1926
- Place of birth: Fürth, Germany
- Date of death: 5 March 2008 (aged 81)
- Position: Midfielder

Youth career
- SpVgg Fürth

Senior career*
Years	Team	Apps	(Gls)
1946–1947	ASV Fürth		
1947–1962	SpVgg Fürth		

International career
1953	West Germany	1	(0)
- * Club domestic league appearances and goals

Richard Gottinger (4 June 1926 – 5 March 2008) was a German international footballer who played for ASV Fürth and SpVgg Fürth.
