= Leif Olsen =

Norwegian footballer (1927-2012)

Personal information
- Full name: Leif Hugo Olsson
- Date of birth: 15 August 1927
- Date of death: 2 February 2012 (aged 84)
- Position: Forward

Senior career*
Years	Team	Apps	(Gls)
1946–1948	Jordal		
1948–1954	Vålerenga		
1954–1960	Strømmen		
1960–1961	Vålerenga		
1961–1962	Strømmen		

International career
1953–1957	Norway B	2	(1)
1953	Norway	3	(0)
- * Club domestic league appearances and goals

Leif Olsen (15 August 1927 – 2 February 2012) was a Norwegian football striker.

Born Leif Hugo Olsson, he assumed the name Leif Olsen while playing for Vålerenga. After the Second World War, when he fled to Sweden in 1943 and enrolled in the Norwegian police troops, he started his football career in Jordal AIL in 1946. He then divided his club career across Vålerenga and Strømmen and represented Norway as a B and full international.
