= Erich Retter =

German footballer

Personal information
- Full name: Erich Retter
- Date of birth: 17 February 1925
- Place of birth: Plüderhausen, Germany
- Date of death: 27 December 2014 (aged 89)
- Position: Defender

Senior career*
Years	Team	Apps	(Gls)
1944–1962	VfB Stuttgart		

International career
1952–1956	West Germany	14	(0)
- * Club domestic league appearances and goals

Erich Retter (17 February 1925 – 27 December 2014) was a German footballer.

== Club career ==
With VfB Stuttgart he won twice the German football championship in 1950 and 1952.

== International career ==
Retter won 14 caps for West Germany between 1952 and 1954. After appearing regularly for the team before tournament he missed out the 1954 FIFA World Cup which West Germany won because of an injury.
