= Kai Frandsen =

Danish footballer (1924–2013)

Personal information
- Date of birth: 15 May 1924
- Date of death: 18 March 2013 (aged 88)

International career
| Years | Team | Apps | (Gls) |
| 1949–1950 | Denmark | 5 | (1) |

Kai Frandsen (15 May 1924 – 18 March 2013) was a Danish footballer. He played in five matches for the Denmark national football team from 1949 to 1950.
