= Knut Sørensen =

Norwegian footballer (1924–2009)

Personal information
- Date of birth: 3 October 1924
- Date of death: 18 December 2009 (aged 85)

International career
Years	Team	Apps	(Gls)
1949	Norway	1	(0)

Knut Sørensen (3 October 1924 – 18 December 2009) was a Norwegian footballer. He played in one match for the Norway national football team in 1949.
