= Thorleif Olsen =

Norwegian footballer (1921–1996)

Personal information
- Date of birth: 15 November 1921
- Place of birth: Kristiania, Norway
- Date of death: 11 March 1996 (aged 74)
- Place of death: Oslo
- Position: Right half

Youth career
- Grønvold IL

Senior career*
Years	Team	Apps	(Gls)
1945–1963	Vålerenga		

International career
1950–1955	Norway	34	(0)
- * Club domestic league appearances and goals

Thorleif Olsen (15 November 1921 – 11 March 1996) was a Norwegian football player. He played for the club Vålerengens IF most of his career, from 1945 to 1963. He was capped 34 times for Norway between 1950 and 1955, and received the Norwegian Football Association Gold Watch in 1954.

He also played bandy and ice hockey at a national level.

== Sports career ==
Born in Kristiania on 15 November 1921, Olsen played for the Oslo sports club Vålerengens IF.

=== Club football ===
Olsen first played football for Grønvold IL, a member of the Workers Federation of Sports. During the German occupation of Norway he played "illegal" matches for Vålerenga. He played for Vålerenga from 1945 until 1963, when he was 41 years old. He is the oldest player who ever played in the Norwegian Top League. He is also the oldest player to score in the top league, in a match against Skeid in October 1963, at the age of 41 years, 323 days.

=== International football ===
Having played three matches for the Norwegian B team, Olsen made his debut for the Norway national football team in 1950. He played regularly for the national team until 1954, and also had two appearances in 1955. He was capped 34 times for Norway between 1950 and 1955. He played for the Norwegian national team at the 1952 Summer Olympics in Helsinki.

He received the Norwegian Football Association Gold Watch in 1954.

=== Bandy and ice hockey ===
Olsen also played bandy and ice hockey at national level. In bandy, he won the regional championship in Oslo, and in ice hockey he won the national B-league.

== Death ==
Olsen died in Oslo on 11 March 1996.
