= FK Sparta Sarpsborg =

Norwegian football club

Sparta Sarpsborg
- Full name: Fotballklubben Sparta Sarpsborg
- Founded: 1928
- Ground: Spartabanen
- Capacity: 500
- Chairman: Lars Malmberg
- Head coach: Terje Jonassen
- League: 4. divisjon
- 2023: 4. divisjon, 8th of 14
- Website: http://www.fkspartasarpsborg.no/
Home colours	Away colours

Fotballklubben Sparta Sarpsborg is the football department of IL Sparta. Founded in 1928, the club got its present name in 2004. The club currently plays in 4. divisjon, the fifth tier of the Norwegian football league system.

== History ==
=== 1950s: The golden years ===
The club won the Norwegian Cup in 1952, having scored all the five goals in the final against Solberg which Sparta won 3–2. Sparta played in Hovedserien from its inception in 1948–49 until 1957–58, only interrupted by one season at the second tier. In the ten seasons at the top tier the average home attendances differed between 1,300 and 5,000.

=== 1999–present: Collaborations and return to lower leagues ===
In 1999, 16 teams in the Sarpsborg area joined forces to create a team that could compete in the top divisions of Norwegian football, called Sarpsborg Fotball, which overtook Sarpsborg FK's spot in the third tier in the league-system. In its first season, the team was relegated from the 2. divisjon, and several clubs, including both Sarpsborg FK and Sparta, withdrew from the collaboration. The remaining clubs in the "Sarpsborg Fotball"-project formed a new club called Borg Fotball, which won promotion to the 2. divisjon in 2002, but was relegated again in 2003. Meanwhile, Sparta was promoted to the 2. divisjon the same season, and re-entered the collaboration club which now was renamed FK Sparta Sarpsborg. The club secured promotion to 1. divisjon in 2005 after decades in the lower divisions, with a 15–0 win against Fram Larvik on 22 October 2005. Ahead of the 2008 season Sparta withdrew their team and gave their place to the new club Sarpsborg 08. Sparta is currently playing in the fourth division, having been relegated from the 3. divisjon in 2016.

== Honours ==
- Norwegian top division
  - Runners-up: 1947–48
- Norwegian Cup
  - Winners: 1952

== Recent seasons ==
Season		Tier	Pos.	Pl.	W	D	L	GS	GA	P	Cup	Notes
2012	4. divisjon	5	↑ 1	26	19	6	1	91	25	63	dnq	Promoted to 3. divisjon
2013	3. divisjon	4	10	26	10	2	14	52	48	32	First round	
2014	3. divisjon	4	↓ 12	26	8	4	14	39	52	28	First qualifying round	Relegated to 4. divisjon
2015	4. divisjon	5	↑ 1	26	20	5	1	81	32	65	First qualifying round	Promoted to 3. divisjon
2016	3. divisjon	4	↓ 13	26	4	4	18	35	80	16	Second round	Relegated to 4. divisjon
2017	4. divisjon	5	10	26	8	7	11	42	49	31	First qualifying round	
2018	4. divisjon	5	7	26	10	4	12	53	64	34	dnq	
2019	4. divisjon	5	↓ 14	26	4	3	19	27	75	15	First round	Relegated to 5. divisjon
2020	Season cancelled											
2021	5. divisjon	6	↑ 3	13	9	2	2	50	20	29	dnq	Promoted to 4. divisjon
2022	4. divisjon	5	8	26	10	4	12	32	48	34	dnq	
