= Willibald Hahn =

Austrian football player and coach (1910–1999)

Personal information
- Date of birth: 31 January 1910
- Place of birth: Vienna, Austria-Hungary
- Date of death: 31 May 1999 (aged 89)
- Position: Midfielder

Senior career*
Years	Team	Apps	(Gls)
1931–1932	Florisdorfer AC		
1932–1933	Austria Wien		
1933–1934	SC de la Bastiedienne Bordeaux		
1934–1935	Favoritner Sportclub		
1935–1937	Favoritner AC		
1937–1938	Admira Wien		

Managerial career
- 1938: Moss FK
- 1952–1955: Norway
- 1955: Vålerenga
- 1956–1958: Bayern Munich
- 1958–1959: Switzerland
- 1960–1962: KSV Hessen Kassel
- 1963–1964: Schwarz-Weiß Essen
- 1964–1966: Rot-Weiß Oberhausen
- 1968: ESV Ingolstadt
- 1969–1971: SpVgg Bayreuth
- 1971–1972: SSV Reutlingen
- 1972–1973: Stuttgarter Kickers
- * Club domestic league appearances and goals

Willibald Hahn (31 January 1910 – 31 May 1999) was an Austrian football player and coach.

== Career ==
Hahn played for Florisdorfer AC, Austria Wien, SC de la Bastidienne Bordeaux, Favoritner Sportclub, Favoritner AC and Admira Wien.

== Coaching career ==
Hahn began his coaching career with Moss FK in Norway and went on to coach the national team. He then coached, Bayern Munich, Switzerland, KSV Hessen Kassel, Schwarz-Weiß Essen, Rot-Weiß Oberhausen, ESV Ingolstadt, SpVgg Bayreuth, SSV Reutlingen and Stuttgarter Kickers.

He won the German Cup of 1957 with Bayern Munich.
