= Odd Wang Sørensen =

Norwegian footballer (1922-2004)

Personal information
- Full name: Odd Wang Sørensen
- Date of birth: 22 December 1922
- Date of death: 10 April 2004 (aged 81)

Senior career*
Years	Team	Apps	(Gls)
1946–1957	Sparta		

International career
1947–1955	Norway	23	(17)
- * Club domestic league appearances and goals

Odd Wang Sørensen (22 December 1922 – 10 April 2004) was a Norwegian international footballer. On club level Sørensen played for Sarpsborg team Sparta, where he won the Norwegian cup in 1952. He played with the Norwegian national team at the Stockholm Olympics in 1952. In total he was capped 25 times and scored 17 goals.

Five of those goals came during the friendly match versus the United States on 6 August 1948, which Norway won 11-0. Sørensen still holds the record for goals scored in one match.
