= Olav Førli =

Norwegian footballer (1920-2011)

Olav Førli (20 July 1920 – 14 March 2011) was a Norwegian football goalkeeper. He joined Larvik Turn from Urædd in 1946, and became a mainstay for the Larvik club. He was capped twice for Norway.
