= Oddvar Hansen =

Norwegian footballer and coach (1921-2011)

Personal information
- Full name: Oddvar Ingolf Hansen
- Date of birth: 11 April 1921
- Place of birth: Bergen, Norway
- Date of death: 31 March 2011 (aged 89)
- Place of death: Bergen, Norway
- Position: Right back

Senior career*
Years	Team	Apps	(Gls)
1940–1956	Brann	238	(38)

International career
1948–1954	Norway	19	(0)

Managerial career
- 1955–1957: Brann
- 1960–1963: Brann
- 1965–1968: Brann
- * Club domestic league appearances and goals

Oddvar Ingolf Hansen (11 April 1921 – 31 March 2011) was a Norwegian footballer and coach, who represented Brann in his hometown Bergen.

As a player, Hansen was a right-back who played 238 first-team games for Brann between 1940 and 1956. He was a losing cup finalist in 1950. He also won 19 caps for Norway between 1948 and 1954, and was a member of Norway's squad at the 1952 Olympics, but he did not play in any matches.

As a coach, Hansen became player-coach of Brann in 1955 when he took over from Englishman George Ainsley. He had three spells as Brann's head coach (1955–57, 1960–63 and 1965–68), and is best remembered for leading the club to consecutive league titles in 1962 and 1963. The 1963 title would turn out to be Brann's last league championship in 44 years, until the drought came to a temporary end in 2007.

In addition to his achievements in football, Hansen was also an excellent table tennis player, who became national champion in 1947. He died on 31 March 2011, less than two weeks before what would have been his 90th birthday.
