= Erich Schanko =

German footballer

Personal information
- Date of birth: 4 October 1919
- Place of birth: Germany
- Date of death: 14 November 2005 (aged 86)
- Position: Forward

Senior career*
Years	Team	Apps	(Gls)
1947–1957	Borussia Dortmund		

International career
1951–1954	West Germany	14	(0)
- * Club domestic league appearances and goals

Erich Schanko (4 October 1919 – 14 November 2005) was a German international footballer who played as a forward for Borussia Dortmund.

== International career ==
Between 1951 and 1954 he won 14 caps for West Germany.
