= FK Kvik =

Norwegian sports club

Kvik
- Full name: Fotballklubben Kvik
- Founded: 6 October 1900; 124 years ago
- Ground: Rosenborgbanen, Trondheim
- League: 3. divisjon
- 2024: 4. divisjon / Trøndelag 1, 1st of 12 (promoted)
Home colours	Away colours

Fotballklubben Kvik (FK Kvik) is a Norwegian association football club from Trondheim. To avoid confusion with the other Norwegian football club named Kvik, which was also known as FK Kvik until 1997, FK Kvik is sometimes referred to as Kvik Trondheim. The club was founded in 1900, and is the oldest football club in Trondheim.

== History ==
Kvik was founded in 1900. For its first fifteen years of existence, Kvik dominated regional football. In 1915, the team reached the semifinal in the Norwegian Football Cup, where it lost 0–3 to Kvik Halden. FK Kvik considers the 1920s to be its golden age. During the 1920s, Kvik played three cup quarter finals, in 1922, 1923, and 1925.

In 1947–48, Kvik participated in the first post-war season of the League of Norway (a predecessor of the Eliteserien). After this season, the league system was changed, and the number of teams at the highest level of Norwegian football decreased from 74 to 16. In this new league system, Kvik played two seasons in the Main League, 1951–52 and 1954–55.

After the 1955–56 season, Kvik found itself playing at the second highest level of Norwegian football. At this time, it competed with several other teams, including Rosenborg BK, over the status of the best football team in Trondheim. Bjørn Hansen, who would later become a professional football manager, played for Kvik during this era.

In 1968, Kvik was relegated to the third highest level. After this, Kvik has not reached its former heights. It currently plays in the Norwegian Fourth Division, the fifth highest level of Norwegian football.

Kvik had a women's football team from 1979 to 1998. Since 1981, Kvik has hosted an indoor football cup, Kvik Cup.

In the first round of the 2006 Norwegian Cup, Kvik played against its former rivals Rosenborg BK, by then one of the best football clubs in Norway. Rosenborg won the match 8–1. After the match, Rosenborg player Per Ciljan Skjelbred commented that Kvik "kept at it like heroes".
