= Thor Hernes =

Norwegian footballer, manager, and sports official

Thor Hernes (15 August 1926 – 18 April 2009) was a Norwegian footballer, manager and sports official.

During the occupation of Norway by Nazi Germany he participated in the resistance Operation Durham. He was decorated with the Defence Medal 1940–1945. After the war he pursued a military career, serving in the Independent Norwegian Brigade Group in Germany, and later stationed at home.

In 1949, upon returning from Germany, Hernes joined the football team of SFK Lyn. He became a first-team stalwart and eventually captain. He was capped 27 times for Norway, and later served in the Football Association of Norway Technical Committee. In the mid-1960s he coached SFK Lyn.

Hernes was hired as organizational manager in the Norwegian Confederation of Sports in 1966, and from 1968 to 1986 he was the secretary-general. During this time, from 1972 to 1975, he also chaired the Council of Europe Sports Committee. Among his laurels was an honorary membership in the Norwegian Confederation of Sports.

He resided at Høvik. He died in April 2009.
