= Harry Boye Karlsen =

Norwegian footballer (1920–1994)

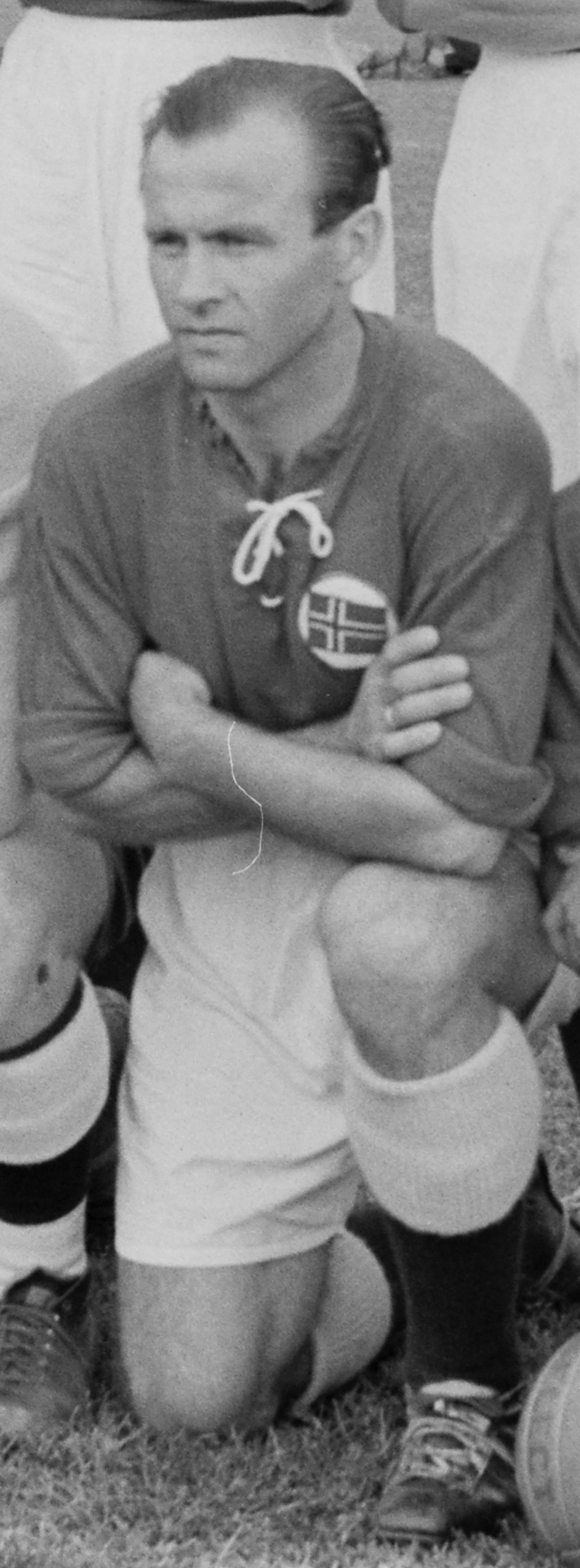
- Karlsen lining up for Norway in 1955

Personal information
- Full name: Harry Boye Karlsen
- Date of birth: 14 March 1920
- Place of birth: Horten, Norway
- Date of death: 8 January 1994 (aged 73)
- Place of death: Stavern, Norway
- Position: Defender

Senior career*
Years	Team	Apps	(Gls)
1940–1941	Ørn-Horten		
1943–1945	Dundee United		
1945	Exeter City	1	(0)
1946–1947	Lyn Oslo		
1947–1952	Ørn-Horten		
1952–1960	Larvik Turn		

International career
1946–1956	Norway	58	(4)
- * Club domestic league appearances and goals

Harry Boye Karlsen (14 March 1920 – 8 January 1994) was a Norwegian international footballer. He was born in Horten, and played 58 games for Norway, scoring four goals, between 1946 and 1956. He was a member of the Norwegian squad that competed at the 1952 Olympics. Karlsen played as a defender or as a wing-half (defensive midfield), and was used as a free kick and penalty taker.

During World War II Karlsen played for several British teams. He joined Dundee United in September 1943, playing regularly for them until being posted to England in January 1945. He returned to make a few more appearances later in the year, and also played a single match for Exeter City in October 1945. After the war he joined Lyn and won the Norwegian cup with them in 1946. He moved back to Horten the following year, rejoining his hometown club Ørn, where he also played before the war. In 1952 he transferred to Larvik Turn where he was also player-coach. At Larvik Turn, Karlsen won the Norwegian Premier League in 1952/53, 1954/55 and 1955/56.
