= Willy Fossli =

Norwegian footballer (1931-2017)

Personal information
- Date of birth: 8 July 1931
- Date of death: 29 January 2017 (aged 85)
- Position: Striker

Senior career*
Years	Team	Apps	(Gls)
1948–1965	Asker		

International career
1953–1957	Norway	6	(0)
- * Club domestic league appearances and goals

Willy Fossli (8 July 1931 – 29 January 2017) was a Norwegian footballer who played for Asker and the Norway national team as a striker. In the 1955–56 Hovedserien season, Fossli scored 17 goals and became the league's top scorer and the only player from Asker to have made the achievement. He was capped six times for the Norway national team.

== Honours ==
Individual

- Norwegian top division top scorer: 1955–56
