= Thorbjørn Svenssen =

Norwegian footballer (1924–2011)

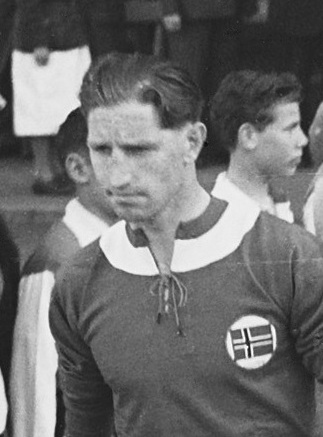
- Svenssen in 1951

Personal information
- Full name: Ole Thorbjørn Svenssen
- Date of birth: 22 April 1924
- Place of birth: Sandefjord, Norway
- Date of death: 8 January 2011 (aged 86)
- Place of death: Sandefjord, Norway
- Position: Central defender

Senior career*
Years	Team	Apps	(Gls)
1945–1966	Sandefjord		

International career
1947–1962	Norway	104	(0)
- * Club domestic league appearances and goals

Ole Thorbjørn Svenssen (22 April 1924 – 8 January 2011) was a Norwegian footballer, who played a then-record 104 international games for Norway and captained the side 93 times. He was one of the first footballers who played 100 international games for their country. He was also part of Norway's squad at the 1952 Summer Olympics.

== Club career ==
Svenssen was a tall and strong central defender who played his entire career for his hometown team Sandefjord. Svenssen played 22 seasons for Sandefjord, but never won a major trophy (Sandefjord finished second in the league in 1955–56). However, he did play twice in the Norwegian Cup finals (1957 and 1959), finishing on the losing side both times. His steady and solid play at the back earned him the nickname "Klippen" ("The Rock").

== International career ==
Svenssen made his debut for the Norway national team on 11 June 1947, in a friendly against Poland. He remained virtually ever-present in the national side throughout the next decade and a half. He was named captain in his 12th international (a friendly against Egypt on Christmas Eve 1948), and kept the captain's armband throughout the rest of his international career.

Svenssen won his 100th cap against Denmark on 17 September 1961. At the time, Svenssen was only the second player in the history of football to reach 100 international appearances. The first was Billy Wright, who reached the milestone in October 1958. Svenssen's 104th and final cap came in a 2-1 win against the Netherlands on 16 May 1962.

When he received his 104th cap, Svenssen was 38 years and 24 days, and is today the fourth oldest player to have played for the Norway national team, only beaten by Frode Johnsen, Gunnar Thoresen and Ronny Johnsen.

== See also ==
- List of men's footballers with 100 or more international caps
- List of one-club men in association football
