= Karl Mai =

German footballer (1928–1993)

Personal information
- Date of birth: 27 July 1928
- Place of birth: Fürth, Germany
- Date of death: 15 March 1993 (aged 64)
- Position: Midfielder

Senior career*
Years	Team	Apps	(Gls)
1942–1958	SpVgg Fürth	182	(17)
1958–1961	Bayern Munich	33	(1)
1961	FC Young Fellows Zürich	20	(1)
1962–1963	FC Dornbirn	41	(0)
Total		276	(19)

International career
1953–1959	West Germany	21	(1)

Managerial career
- 1963: ESV Ingolstadt
Medal record
Representing West Germany
FIFA World Cup
Winner	1954 Switzerland
- * Club domestic league appearances and goals

Karl (Charly) Mai (27 July 1928 – 15 March 1993) was a German footballer who played as a midfielder.

Mai was born in Fürth. He was part of the West Germany national team that won the 1954 FIFA World Cup. In total he earned 21 caps and scored one goal for West Germany. During his club career he played for SpVgg Fürth and Bayern Munich.

Sepp Herberger compared Mai's playing style to that of 1930s player Andreas Kupfer but also appreciated his solidity and straightness. In the 1954 World Cup Final Mai faced Sandor Kocsis who had scored no less than 11 goals up to that game, yet he failed to score in the final as Mai performed a rigid marking job on Kocsis. Mai was an outspoken player who also did not shy away from stating his opinion towards Herberger.

After his professional career he became a coach in the 1960s and then a school trainer. In the early 1990s, his right lung was removed. He died in 1993.
