= Arne Natland =

Norwegian footballer (1927–2009)

Arne Natland (22 May 1927 – 6 November 2009) was a Norwegian footballer. He played for Skeid in the top Norwegian league, and later moved to Tønsberg and played for Eik-Tønsberg. He was capped 26 times for the Norwegian national team, without scoring. After his active career he forayed into supermarket retail in the Tønsberg district, co-founding the FK chain, which would later become Meny.
