= Kjell Kristiansen =

Norwegian footballer (1925-1999)

Personal information
- Date of birth: 19 March 1925
- Place of birth: Asker, Norway
- Date of death: 19 September 1999 (aged 74)
- Position: Forward

International career
Years	Team	Apps	(Gls)
1952–1959	Norway	26	(10)

Kjell Kristiansen (19 March 1925 – 19 September 1999) was a Norwegian footballer. He played in 26 matches for the Norway national football team from 1952 to 1959. He was also named in Norway's squads for the 1952 Summer Olympics and the Group 1 qualification tournament for the 1954 FIFA World Cup.
