= Harald Hennum =

Norwegian footballer (1928-1993)

Personal information
- Full name: Harald Ove Hennum
- Date of birth: 29 May 1928
- Place of birth: Oslo, Norway
- Date of death: 14 October 1993 (aged 65)
- Place of death: Oslo, Norway
- Position: Forward

Senior career*
Years	Team	Apps	(Gls)
1949–1952	Frigg		
1953–1959	Skeid		
1959–1960	Frigg		
1962–1963	Frigg		

International career
1949–1960	Norway	43	(25)
- * Club domestic league appearances and goals

Harald Ove Hennum (29 May 1928 – 14 October 1993) was a Norwegian footballer who played as a forward for Frigg and Skeid. He was one of Norway's greatest football profiles in the 1950s.

== Club career ==
Hennum started his career playing for Frigg where he had a total of three spells. As a player at Skeid, Hennum won the Norwegian Cup with Skeid four times, in 1954, 1955, 1956 and 1958.

== International career ==
For the Norway national team, Hennum played 43 matches and scored 25 goals, thereby placing fifth on Norway's all-time top goalscorer list. He scored four goals in a 1958 friendly match against GDR.

== Honours ==
Skeid

- Norwegian Cup: 1954, 1955, 1956, 1958

Individual

- Norwegian top division top scorer: 1954–55, 1957–58
