= FK Eik Tønsberg =

Norwegian sports club

FK Eik Tønsberg 871
- Full name: Fotballklubben Eik Tønsberg Allianseidrettslag
- Nickname: Eik
- Founded: 14 March 1928; 98 years ago; as Eik IF
- Ground: Tønsberg Gressbane
- Capacity: 5,600
- League: 2. divisjon
- 2024: 2. divisjon group 1, 3rd of 14
- Website: www.fkeiktonsberg.no
Home colours	Away colours

Fotballklubben Eik Tønsberg Allianseidrettslag (formerly known as Eik-Tønsberg), is a Norwegian football club from the Eik neighborhood of Tønsberg, Vestfold. The club got its current name on 1 January 2020 after a merger with FK Tønsberg. The football team competes with the name FK Eik Tønsberg 871 where the number represents the founding year of the town of Tønsberg.

== History ==
Former logo of Eik IF Tønsberg

The club was founded as Eik Idrettsforening on 14 March 1928, and included the city name Tønsberg in 1989. Before 1988, the district Eik was located in Sem Municipality, but Sem was incorporated into Tønsberg.

It was formerly a team of nationwide importance. The team played their first season in the Norwegian top division in the 1957–58 season and finished in sixth place out of eight teams in group B. In the 1959–60 season they finished second in the Main League group B, reaching a bronze play-off match which they won 4–2 against Vålerengen. Since this was the first time a bronze play-off was held, Eik became the first bronze medalists in Norwegian football's top division. In the following 1960–61 season they won the Main League group B, reaching a gold playoff match which they lost to Fredrikstad. Well-known players were Arne Natland, Arne Høivik and Tore Halvorsen, all of whom were capped by Norway.

Eik were promoted to the Norwegian top flight in 1982, finished fifth in 1983, and were relegated in 1985. Among the profiles on this team were midfielder Geir "Bolla" Johansen and striker Nick Sandberg, both of whom played briefly on the international stage, as well as future Tottenham goalkeeper Erik Thorstvedt who left the club after the 1983 season.

In the 1990s the team was a mainstay in the 1. divisjon, the second tier. After the 1997 season it even contested a playoff to win promotion to the Tippeligaen, but did not win. The team was relegated after the 2000 1. divisjon season, and played in the 2001 2. divisjon.

=== Merger with FK Tønsberg ===
On 10 October 2001, a new club was founded. FK Tønsberg was to be an umbrella team in the district, and was supported by 20 teams in the region. As Eik-Tønsberg was the best regional team, FK Tønsberg took their place in the league system from 2002 and Eik-Tønsberg started anew.

Eik-Tønsberg won their 3. divisjon group in both 2003, 2004 and 2005, but in each year it succumbed to other clubs in the promotion playoffs. In 2010 the club also contested the playoffs as the 2nd placed team, but was again defeated, and remained in the 3. divisjon. It was relegated to the 4. divisjon after the 2012 season. The club was promoted back to the 3. divisjon for the 2015 season, but was relegated again in 2016. After the 2020 merger with FK Tønsberg, Eik Tønsberg advanced a tier since FK Tønsberg played in the 3. divisjon at the time. In 2023, FK Eik Tønsberg were promoted to the 2. divisjon.

== Recent seasons ==
Season	League									Cup	Notes
Season	Division	Pos.	Pl.	W	D	L	GS	GA	P	Cup	Notes
2013	4. divisjon	4	22	14	4	6	56	29	46	Second qual. round	
2014	4. divisjon	↑ 1	22	18	2	2	68	26	56	Did not participate	Promoted
2015	3. divisjon	10	26	9	4	13	60	68	31	First qual. round	
2016	3. divisjon	↓ 9	26	12	2	12	77	66	38	First qual. round	Relegated
2017	4. divisjon	3	18	12	1	5	74	27	37	Second qual. round	
2018	4. divisjon	2	20	18	1	1	91	16	55	First round	
2019	4. divisjon	3	22	13	1	8	79	44	40	Second qual. round	
2020	Merged with FK Tønsberg. Season cancelled due to the COVID-19 pandemic.										
2021	3. divisjon	2	13	8	3	2	29	14	27	First round	
2022	3. divisjon	4	26	14	7	5	54	31	49	First round	
2023	3. divisjon	↑ 1	26	23	2	1	89	13	71	Second round	Promoted

== Current squad ==
As of 3 September 2026

Note: Flags indicate national team as defined under FIFA eligibility rules; some limited exceptions apply. Players may hold more than one non-FIFA nationality.

No.	Pos.	Nation	Player
1	GK	NOR	Emil Wilhelmsen Moe
3	DF	NOR	Vemund Skar Roberg
4	DF	NOR	Joacim Lundhagebakken
6	DF	NOR	Harald Danielsen
7	FW	NOR	Sander Aamelfot
8	MF	NOR	Thomas Nygaard
9	FW	NOR	Benjamin Stokke
10	MF	NOR	Danilo dos Santos Jonker
11	MF	NOR	Anders Nygaard
12	DF	NOR	Christer Reppesgård Hansen
13	GK	NOR	Daniel Rønning
15	DF	NOR	Kristian Lillevik

No.	Pos.	Nation	Player
16	MF	NOR	Benjamin Hellum Andersen
17	MF	NOR	Wilhelm Schmidt Godø
18	MF	NOR	Erik Muhle
20	MF	NOR	Mohamed Srour
21	MF	ENG	Carlos Flood
23	MF	NOR	Elliot Lavlund
24	MF	NOR	Andreas Larsen
28	MF	NOR	Magnus Moen
29	MF	NOR	Mads Volden
35	MF	NOR	Leander Larona Gunnerød (on loan from Stabæk)
77	MF	NOR	Martin Solli
