= Gunnar Dybwad (footballer) =

Norwegian footballer (1928-2012)

Personal information
- Date of birth: 21 August 1928
- Place of birth: Steinkjer, Norway
- Date of death: 9 May 2012 (aged 83)
- Position: Forward

Senior career*
Years	Team	Apps	(Gls)
1945–1950	Steinkjer IFK		
1951	SK Freidig		
1951–1957	Steinkjer IFK		
1957–1959	IFK Östersund		
1959–1963	Steinkjer IFK		

International career
1951–1960	Norway	27	(11)
- * Club domestic league appearances and goals

Gunnar Dybwad (21 August 1928 – 9 May 2012) was a Norwegian football forward.

He was born in Steinkjer, and played for Steinkjer IFK, SK Freidig and IFK Östersund. Dybwad made his debut for Norway in a friendly game against England amateur team on 15 May 1951 and scored his first two international goal in a 2–4 loss against Yugoslavia on 23 August 1951. He was capped 27 times, scoring 11 goals. He was the first player from Nord-Trøndelag, and the first player from a club north of Trondheim to play for Norway

He died in 2012.
