= Sandefjord BK =

Norwegian football club

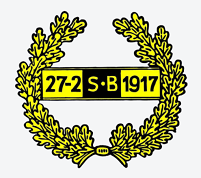
- Full name: Sandefjord Ballklubb
- Nickname(s): Ballklubben, SB, Gule, Sandefjord Ball
- Founded: 27 February 1917; 108 years ago
- Ground: Storstadion; Sandefjord
- Capacity: 7,000
- Manager: Sigurd Andreas Holmen
- League: Norwegian Fourth Division
- 2023: 2.place
Home colours	Away colours

Sandefjord Ballklubb is a Norwegian football club from Sandefjord, currently playing in Norwegian Fourth Division, the fifth tier in the Norwegian football league system. The club was founded on 27 February 1917. Their home matches are played at Storstadion in Sandefjord.

== History ==
Sandefjord Ballklubb was established in 1917 under the name Sportsklubben Frem. It received its current name in 1918. In 1919, the team participated in the Norwegian championships for the first time. The Sandefjord stadium was opened in 1925 as the first grassy soccer field in Vestfold County. An early notable player in the 1940s was defender Thorbjørn Svenssen.

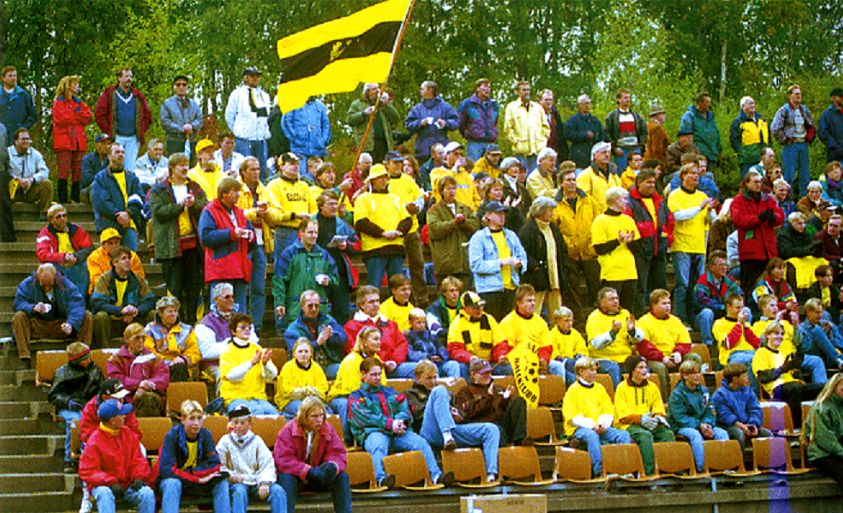
Sandefjord Ballklubb - Jevnaker IF 1.okt 1995

Sandefjord Ballklubb played in Hovedserien, the highest league in the league system, from 1948–49 to 1961–62, and in 1964 and 1965. They also played in the Norwegian Cup Final in 1957 and 1959, but lost both. Its last stint in the Norwegian First Division was in 1995.

On 10 September 1998, Ballklubben formed the elite football team Sandefjord Fotball with local rivals Runar, in an attempt to take Sandefjord back to the top level of football in Norway.

== Norwegian internationals ==
Sandefjord Ballklubb is the club that Thorbjørn "Klippen" Svenssen, the first Norwegian to earn 100 caps for the national team, played all his matches for during his career from 1945 to 1966. During the same period, Øivind Johannessen, Ragnar Hvidsten and Yngve Karlsen also earned caps playing for Norway.
