= Larvik Turn =

Norwegian sports club

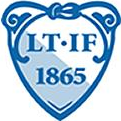
- Full name: Larvik Turn & Idrettsforening
- Founded: 1865
- Ground: Lovisenlund; Larvik
- Chairman: Steinar Islan (club), Frank Duvholt (football group)
- Manager: Robin Andreassen
- League: Third Division
- 2011: Third Division/ 5, 9th
Home colours	Away colours

Larvik Turn & Idrettsforening is a Norwegian sports club that has sections for football, handball, athletics, wrestling, and gymnastics. The club was founded in 1865, and has offered football since 1906.

The football team was at its best during the 1950s, when it won the Norwegian Premier League three times; in 1953, 1955, and 1956. The club's only cup final appearance came in 1956, but this match was lost 2–1 to Skeid. Former Norwegian internationals Gunnar Thoresen, Hallvar Thoresen, Tom Sundby and Gunnar Halle have all played for Larvik Turn & I.F.

The most prominent representative of the athletics section is Lars Martin Kaupang, who had the Norwegian record in 1500 metres with 3:37.4 minutes from 30 June 1976 until 29 April 2012.

== Football record ==
First Level: 1937–1948, 1952–1962

Second Level: 1948–1952, 1963, 1973–1977

Third Level: 1964–1967, 1970–1972, 1978–1982, 1988, 1997–1998

Fourth Level: 1968–1969, 1983–1987, 1989–1996, 1999–
