= IL Sparta =

IL Sparta is a multi-sport club from Sarpsborg, Norway. The club was founded on 23 November 1928, and today it has sections for football and ice hockey. While the club have had a football department since the foundation, the ice hockey department was founded in 1959. The club has previously also been playing bandy.

Sparta is regarded as one of the big clubs of Norwegian ice hockey, having played in the top division uninterrupted since 1980, and having won the Norwegian ice hockey championship three times (1984, 1989 and 2011) as well as four regular-season titles. Sparta's football department enjoyed its best run in the 1950s when the club played nine seasons in the top division and won the Norwegian Cup in 1952, but currently plays in the lower divisions.

== Ice hockey ==
Sparta's ice hockey department was officially named Ishockeyklubben Sparta Sarpsborg, but was promoted under the name Sparta Warriors. The club became Norwegian champions in 1984 and 1989, and won Eliteserien in 1984, 1986, 2009 and 2011. Sparta was the first sports-club in Norwegian history to bankrupt in 1995, withdrew from Eliteserien and restarted at the lowest tier of Norwegian ice hockey. Sparta have in the recent years had the highest average home attendance of the Norwegian ice hockey clubs, with the local derbies against Stjernen having the highest attendance throughout the season. Sparta also fields a women's team, which was Norwegian champions in 2009. The department filed for bankruptcy and dissolved on 16 September 2026.

== Football ==
Sparta Sarpsborg
- Full name: Fotballklubben Sparta Sarpsborg
- Ground: Spartabanen
- Capacity: 500
- Chairman: Lars Malmberg
- Head coach: Terje Jonassen
- League: 4. divisjon
- 2018: 4. divisjon, 7th of 14
- Website: http://www.fkspartasarpsborg.no/
Home colours	Away colours

Sparta's football department is officially named Fotballklubben Sparta Sarpsborg, which has been its name since 2004. The club won the Norwegian Cup in 1952, having scored all the five goals in the final against Solberg which Sparta won 3-2. Sparta played in Hovedserien from the start in 1948–49 until 1957–58, only interrupted by one season at the second tier. In the ten seasons at the top tier the average attendance differed between 1300 and 5000. After decades in the lower divisions, Sparta secured promotion to Adeccoligaen in 2005, with a 15-0 win against Fram Larvik on 22 October 2005. Ahead of the 2008 season Sparta withdrew their team and gave place to the new club called Sarpsborg 08. Sparta is currently playing in the fourth division, having won promotion from the fifth division in 2010.

=== Honours ===
- Norwegian top division
  - Runners-up: 1947–48
- Norwegian Cup
  - Winners: 1952
