= List of Saarland international footballers =

The Saarland national football team represented the Saar Protectorate in international football, and played 19 matches between 1950 and 1956. In total, 42 players appeared for the national team. With the exception of Kurt Clemens, who briefly played for Nancy, all players were members of clubs in Saarland. However, not all of players had personal or family roots in Saarland. Franz Immig had already played for Germany in 1939, while Karl Ringel, Gerhard Siedl and Heinz Vollmar did so in later years.

== Key ==
Positions key
GK	Goalkeeper
DF	Defender
MF	Midfielder
FW	Forward

Player
This colour background and the * symbol indicate that the player previously appeared for the Germany national team.
This colour background and the † symbol indicate that the player later appeared for the West Germany national team.
Position
Playing positions are listed according to the player's primary position while playing for the national team.
Caps and goals
Caps and goals comprise those in the 1954 FIFA World Cup qualification tournament, as well as international friendly matches.

== Players ==
Saarland national football team players
Player	Pos.	Caps	Goals	Debut		Last match		Ref.
Player	Pos.	Caps	Goals	Date	Opponent	Date	Opponent	Ref.
Fritz Altmeyer	FW	6	3	26 September 1954	Yugoslavia	1 May 1956	Switzerland	
Jakob Balzert	FW	6	0	27 May 1951	Austria B	8 November 1953	Norway	
Karl Berg	DF	9	1	22 November 1950	Switzerland B	1 May 1955	Portugal B	
Nikolaus Biewer	DF	11	0	22 November 1950	Switzerland B	26 September 1954	Yugoslavia	
Hans Bild	FW	2	0	27 May 1951	Austria B	14 October 1951	Austria B	
Herbert Binkert	FW	12	6	27 May 1951	Austria B	6 June 1956	Netherlands	
Horst Borcherding	GK	3	0	26 September 1954	Yugoslavia	6 June 1956	Netherlands	
Kurt Clemens	MF	10	0	22 November 1950	Switzerland B	6 June 1956	Netherlands	
Manfred Ebert	FW	2	0	1 May 1956	Switzerland	3 June 1956	Portugal B	
Werner Emser	FW	3	1	5 June 1954	Uruguay	17 October 1954	France B	
Ewald Follmann	FW	3	1	22 November 1950	Switzerland B	16 November 1955	Netherlands	
Helmut Fottner	FW	2	0	8 November 1953	Norway	5 June 1954	Uruguay	
Günter Herrmann	FW	1	0	3 June 1956	Portugal B	3 June 1956	Portugal B	
Dieter Honecker	FW	1	0	3 June 1956	Portugal B	3 June 1956	Portugal B	
Franz Immig *	DF	3	0	15 September 1951	Switzerland B	20 April 1952	France B	
Ladislav Jirasek	GK	1	0	5 June 1954	Uruguay	5 June 1954	Uruguay	
Albert Keck	DF	10	0	24 June 1953	Norway	6 June 1956	Netherlands	
Horst Klauck	GK	1	0	5 June 1954	Uruguay	5 June 1954	Uruguay	
Peter Krieger	FW	4	1	9 October 1955	France B	6 June 1956	Netherlands	
Karl-Heinz Kunkel	FW	1	0	3 June 1956	Portugal B	3 June 1956	Portugal B	
Gerd Lauck	DF	5	0	1 May 1955	Portugal B	6 June 1956	Netherlands	
Erich Leibenguth	MF	5	5	22 November 1950	Switzerland B	20 April 1952	France B	
Herbert Martin	FW	17	6	22 November 1950	Switzerland B	6 June 1956	Netherlands	
Peter Momber	DF	10	1	22 November 1950	Switzerland B	1 May 1956	Switzerland	
Hermann Monter	FW	2	0	26 September 1954	Yugoslavia	1 May 1955	Portugal B	
Hans Neuerburg	GK	1	0	3 June 1956	Portugal B	3 June 1956	Portugal B	
Robert Niederkirchner	FW	1	1	5 June 1954	Uruguay	5 June 1954	Uruguay	
Werner Otto	FW	6	1	5 October 1952	France B	26 September 1954	Yugoslavia	
Waldemar Philippi	DF	18	0	22 November 1950	Switzerland B	6 June 1956	Netherlands	
Werner Prauss	DF	1	0	3 June 1956	Portugal B	3 June 1956	Portugal B	
Theodor Puff	DF	12	0	27 May 1951	Austria B	6 June 1956	Netherlands	
Walter Riedschy	DF	1	0	1 May 1955	Portugal B	1 May 1955	Portugal B	
Karl Ringel †	FW	2	1	3 June 1956	Portugal B	6 June 1956	Netherlands	
Karl Schirra	FW	6	0	22 November 1950	Switzerland B	17 October 1954	France B	
Heinrich Schmidt	DF	1	0	22 November 1950	Switzerland B	22 November 1950	Switzerland B	
Heinz Schussig	DF	3	0	5 October 1952	France B	16 November 1955	Netherlands	
Gerhard Siedl †	FW	16	4	15 September 1951	Switzerland B	6 June 1956	Netherlands	
Willi Sippel	DF	4	0	5 June 1954	Uruguay	1 May 1955	Portugal B	
Erwin Strempel	GK	14	0	22 November 1950	Switzerland B	16 November 1955	Netherlands	
Heinz Vollmar †	FW	4	4	9 October 1955	France B	6 June 1956	Netherlands	
Erwin Wilhelm	DF	1	0	14 October 1951	Austria B	14 October 1951	Austria B	
Ernst Zägel	FW	1	0	3 June 1956	Portugal B	3 June 1956	Portugal B	

== See also ==
- Saarland national football B team
- List of Germany men's international footballers
- List of East Germany international footballers
