= Saarland national football team records and statistics =

The following tables show the Saarland national football team's all-time international record. The statistics are composed of FIFA World Cup qualifiers, and international friendly matches.

Saarland played their first international fixture against Switzerland on 22 November 1950, which ended in a 5–3 victory for Saarland.

== Individual records ==
=== Player records ===
In total, 42 players appeared for the Saarland national team. Waldemar Philippi holds the record for the most caps, appearing in 18 out of the team's 19 matches and only missing a friendly against Uruguay in 1954.

==== Most caps ====
Rank	Player	Caps	Goals
1	Waldemar Philippi	18	0
2	Herbert Martin	17	6
3	Gerhard Siedl	16	4
4	Erwin Strempel	14	0
5	Herbert Binkert	12	6
5	Theodor Puff	12	0
7	Nikolaus Biewer	11	0
8	Kurt Clemens	10	0
8	Albert Keck	10	0
8	Peter Momber	10	1

==== All goalscorers ====
Rank	Player	Goals	Caps	Average
1	Herbert Binkert	6	12	0.50
1	Herbert Martin	6	17	0.35
3	Erich Leibenguth	5	5	1.00
4	Gerhard Siedl	4	16	0.25
4	Heinz Vollmar	4	4	1.00
6	Fritz Altmeyer	3	6	0.50
7	Karl Berg	1	9	0.11
7	Werner Emser	1	3	0.33
7	Ewald Follmann	1	3	0.33
7	Peter Krieger	1	4	0.25
7	Peter Momber	1	10	0.10
7	Robert Niederkirchner	1	1	1.00
7	Werner Otto	1	6	0.17
7	Karl Ringel	1	2	0.50

==== Clean sheets ====
Two goalkeepers managed to keep a clean sheet in Saarland's nineteen matches.

Player	Caps	Clean sheet			Average
Player	Caps	Date	Opponent	Score	Average
Erwin Strempel	14	8 November 1953	Norway	0–0	0.07
Hans Neuerburg	1	3 June 1956	Portugal B	0–0	1.00

== Performances ==
=== Performance by competition ===
Competition	Played	Won	Drawn	Lost	For	Against	Diff	Win %	Loss %
FIFA World Cup qualification	4	1	1	2	4	8	–4	25%	50%
International Friendlies	15	5	2	8	32	46	–14	33%	53%
Total	19	6	3	10	36	54	–18	32%	53%

=== Performance by manager ===
Years	Manager	Played	Won	Drawn	Lost	For	Against	Diff	Win %	Loss %
1950–1951	Auguste Jordan	4	3	0	1	14	11	+3	75%	25%
1952–1956	Helmut Schön	15	3	3	9	22	43	–21	20%	60%
Total		19	6	3	10	36	54	–18	32%	53%

=== Performance by venue ===
Venue	Played	Won	Drawn	Lost	For	Against	Diff	Win %	Loss %
Home	11	3	3	5	20	29	–9	27%	45%
Away	8	3	0	5	16	25	–9	38%	63%
Total	19	6	3	10	36	54	–18	32%	53%

== Head-to-head record ==
Key
Positive balance (more Wins)
Neutral balance (Wins = Losses)
Negative balance (more Losses)

Opponent	Played	Won	Drawn	Lost	For	Against	Diff	Win %	Loss %
Austria	2	1	0	1	4	6	–2	50%	50%
France	4	2	0	2	11	11	0	50%	50%
Netherlands	2	0	0	2	3	5	–2	0%	100%
Norway	2	1	1	0	3	2	+1	50%	0%
Portugal	2	0	1	1	1	6	–5	0%	50%
Serbia	1	0	0	1	1	5	–4	0%	100%
Switzerland	3	2	1	0	11	6	+5	67%	0%
Uruguay	1	0	0	1	1	7	–6	0%	100%
West Germany	2	0	0	2	1	6	–5	0%	100%
Total	19	6	3	10	36	54	–18	32%	53%
