= 1952 German football championship =

1952 German championship
Deutsche Fußballmeisterschaft

Tournament details
- Country: West Germany
- Dates: 27 April – 22 June
- Teams: 8

Final positions
- Champions: VfB Stuttgart; 2nd German title
- Runners-up: 1. FC Saarbrücken

Tournament statistics
- Matches played: 25
- Goals scored: 113 (4.52 per match)
- Top goal scorer: Konrad Winterstein (7 goals)

The 1952 German football championship was the culmination of the football season in the West Germany in 1951–52. VfB Stuttgart were crowned champions for the second time after a group stage and a final, having previously won the championship in 1950.

== Qualified teams ==
The teams qualified through the 1951–52 Oberliga season:

Club	Qualified from
Hamburger SV	Oberliga Nord champions
VfL Osnabrück	Oberliga Nord runners-up
Rot-Weiss Essen	Oberliga West champions
Schalke 04	Oberliga West runners-up
Tennis Borussia Berlin	Oberliga Berlin champions
1. FC Saarbrücken	Oberliga Südwest champions
VfB Stuttgart	Oberliga Süd champions
1. FC Nürnberg	Oberliga Süd runners-up

== Competition ==
=== Group 1 ===
Pos	Team	Pld	W	D	L	GF	GA	GR	Pts	Qualification	FCS	FCN	HSV	S04
1	1. FC Saarbrücken	6	4	0	2	17	13	1.308	8	Advance to final	—	3–1	3–0	4–1
2	1. FC Nürnberg	6	3	1	2	18	13	1.385	7		5–2	—	4–0	4–2
3	Hamburger SV	6	3	0	3	16	15	1.067	6		4–1	4–2	—	8–2
4	Schalke 04	6	1	1	4	12	22	0.545	3		2–4	2–2	3–0	—

Source: RSSSF
Rules for classification: 1) Points; 2) Goal ratio.

27 April 1952	Hamburger SV	4 – 2	1. FC Nürnberg	Hamburg
	Harden 8', 49'; Klepacz 13'; Woitkowiak 43'		Winterstein 37', 76'	Stadium: Sportplatz am Rothenbaum; Attendance: 28,000; Referee: Wershoven (Euskirchen)

27 April 1952	1. FC Saarbrücken	4 – 1	Schalke 04	Saarbrücken
	Schreiner 23'; Momber 42'; Otto 54'; Binkert 85'		Klodt 77'	Stadium: Kieselhumes; Attendance: 35,000; Referee: Eberle (Stuttgart)

11 May 1952	1. FC Nürnberg	5 – 2	1. FC Saarbrücken	Nuremberg
	Morlock 2'; Winterstein 17', 70'; Herbolsheimer 34', 89'		Otto 6'; Binkert 37'	Stadium: Club-Stadion im Zabo; Attendance: 65,000; Referee: Müller (Soest)

11 May 1952	Schalke 04	3 – 0	Hamburger SV	Gelsenkirchen
	Malinowski 60', 76'; Kuzniewski 83'			Stadium: Glückauf-Kampfbahn; Attendance: 43,000; Referee: Schmetzer (Mannheim)

18 May 1952	Schalke 04	2 – 2	1. FC Nürnberg	Gelsenkirchen
	Klodt 46'; Kuzniewski 48'		Glomb 33'; Morlock 88'	Stadium: Glückauf-Kampfbahn; Attendance: 42,000; Referee: Pucker (Berlin)

18 May 1952	1. FC Saarbrücken	3 – 0	Hamburger SV	Saarbrücken
	Martin 35', 70'; Momber 64'			Stadium: Kieselhumes; Attendance: 30,000; Referee: Fink (Frankfurt)

25 May 1952	1. FC Nürnberg	4 – 2	Schalke 04	Nuremberg
	Morlock 8' (pen.), 66'; Mirsberger 71'; Winterstein 84'		Malinowski 21'; Kuzniewski 65'	Stadium: Club-Stadion im Zabo; Attendance: 50,000; Referee: Burmeister (Hamburg)

25 May 1952	Hamburger SV	4 – 1	1. FC Saarbrücken	Hamburg
	Harden 8', 44', 89'; Schemel 25'		Balzert 15'	Stadium: Sportplatz am Rothenbaum; Attendance: 28,000

2 June 1952	1. FC Nürnberg	4 – 0	Hamburger SV	Nuremberg
	Morlock 10', 53'; Winterstein 47', 70'			Stadium: Club-Stadion im Zabo; Attendance: 30,000; Referee: Nettekoven (Bonn)

2 June 1952	Schalke 04	2 – 4	1. FC Saarbrücken	Gelsenkirchen
	Malinowski 18'; Kuzniewski 60'		Binkert 23'; Otto 31'; Martin 68'; Momber 86'	Stadium: Glückauf-Kampfbahn; Attendance: 35,000; Referee: Ruhmann (Regensburg)

8 June 1952	1. FC Saarbrücken	3 – 1	1. FC Nürnberg	Saarbrücken
	Schreiner 57'; Binkert 70'; Momber 81'		Glomb 11'	Stadium: Kieselhumes; Attendance: 35,000; Referee: Ternieden (Oberhausen)

8 June 1952	Hamburger SV	8 – 2	Schalke 04	Hamburg
	Klepacz 19', 67', 71'; Pendorf 39', 90'; Woitkowiak 46', 85'; Harden 87'		Kleina 56'; Kuzniewski 64'	Stadium: Sportplatz am Rothenbaum; Attendance: 20,000; Referee: Reinhardt (Stuttgart)

=== Group 2 ===
Pos	Team	Pld	W	D	L	GF	GA	GR	Pts	Qualification	VFB	RWE	OSN	TBB
1	VfB Stuttgart	6	3	2	1	14	8	1.750	8	Advance to final	—	5–3	3–1	3–0
2	Rot-Weiss Essen	6	3	0	3	14	15	0.933	6		3–2	—	2–0	2–4
3	VfL Osnabrück	6	2	1	3	9	9	1.000	5		0–0	3–2	—	4–0
4	Tennis Borussia Berlin	6	2	1	3	8	13	0.615	5		1–1	1–2	2–1	—

Source: RSSSF
Rules for classification: 1) Points; 2) Goal ratio.

=== Final ===
22 June 1952

VfB Stuttgart	3–2	1. FC Saarbrücken
Schlienz 18'; Baitinger 43' 73'		Schreiner 15'; Martin 54'

Südweststadion, Ludwigshafen
Attendance: 86,000
Referee: J. Nettekoven (Bonn)

STUTTGART:
GK	1	(West Germany) Karl Bögelein
RB	2	(West Germany) Rolf Krauß
CB	5	(West Germany) Erich Retter
LB	3	(West Germany) Richard Steimle
RH	4	(West Germany) Robert Schlienz (c)
LH	6	(West Germany) Karl Barufka
OR	7	(West Germany) Otto Baitinger
IR	8	(West Germany) Leo Kronenbitter
CF	9	(West Germany) Roland Wehrle
IL	10	(West Germany) Peter Krieger
OL	11	(West Germany) Rolf Blessing
Manager:
(West Germany) Georg Wurzer

SAARBRÜCKEN:
GK	1	(Saar Protectorate) Erwin Strempel
RB	2	(Saar Protectorate) Waldemar Philippi
CB	5	(Saar Protectorate) Nikolaus Biewer
LB	3	(Saar Protectorate) Theodor Puff
RH	4	(Saar Protectorate) Karl Berg
LH	6	(Saar Protectorate) Jakob Balzert (c)
OR	7	(Saar Protectorate) Werner Otto
IR	8	(Saar Protectorate) Herbert Martin
CF	9	(Saar Protectorate) Herbert Binkert
IL	10	(Saar Protectorate) Peter Momber
OL	11	(Saar Protectorate) Konrad Schreiner
Manager:
(France) August Jordan
