= List of Germany international footballers =

Players of Germany's national football team

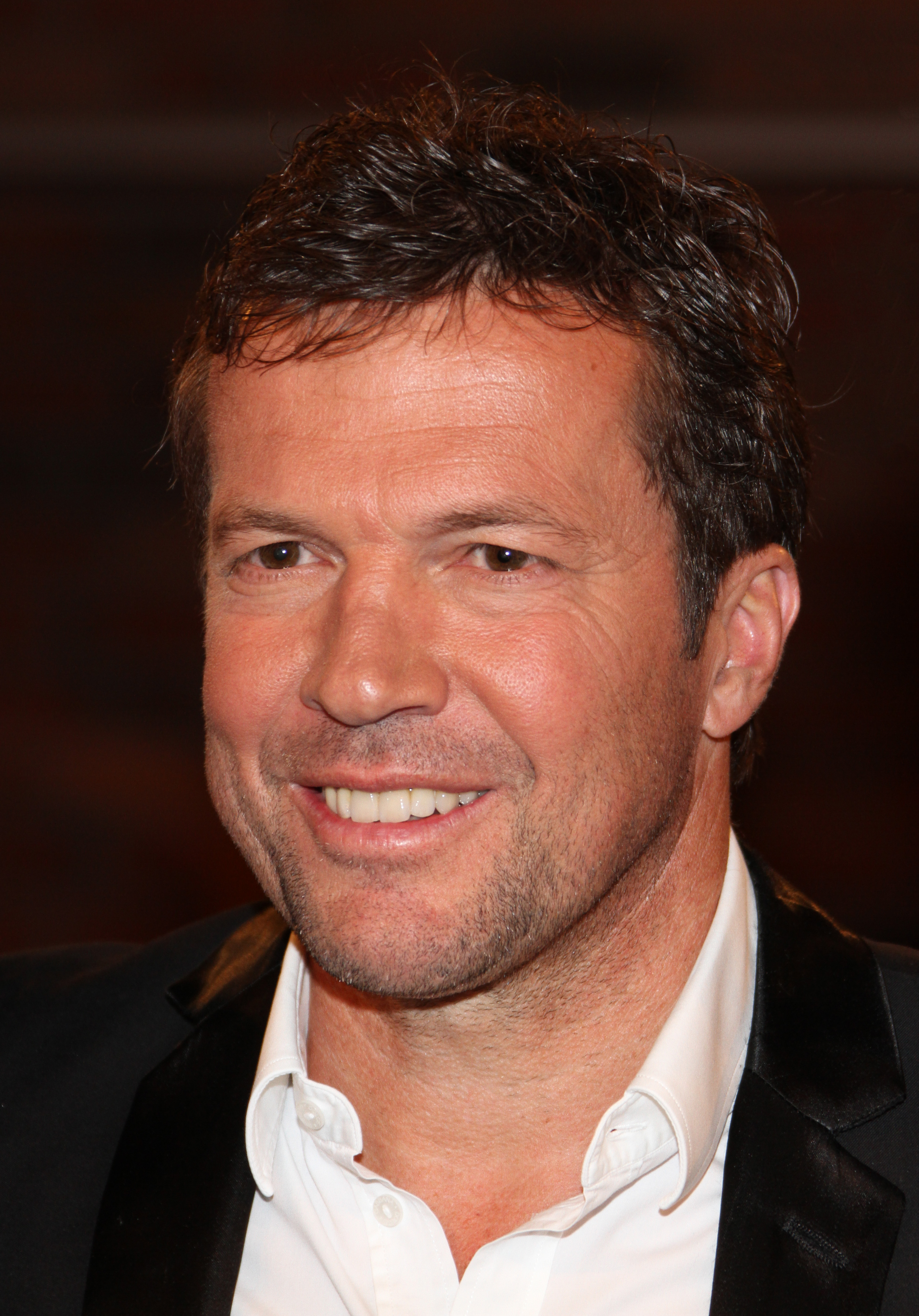
Lothar Matthäus earned 150 caps for Germany, a team record, and went to nine major international tournaments, captaining the 1990 World Cup-winning team.

The Germany national football team played its first international match on 5 April 1908 during the era of the German Empire, losing 5–3 to Switzerland in Basel. The team has been one of the most successful national sides in world football. They won the World Cup in 1954, 1974, 1990 and 2014, as well as the European Championship in 1972, 1980 and 1996. In doing so, twenty of its players have won both titles, and six have won gold, silver and bronze medals at the World Cup. Lothar Matthäus has played in a record 25 World Cup matches, and his participation in five World Cup tournaments is a joint record, shared with Antonio Carbajal of Mexico. Miroslav Klose is the highest goalscorer in the tournament's history with 16 goals, while Gerd Müller is third with 14. Former team captain Franz Beckenbauer is one of only three men to win the World Cup as a player and as a manager. German goalkeeper Bodo Illgner became the first ever goalkeeper to keep a clean sheet in the final of a FIFA World Cup in 1990. Oliver Kahn won the golden ball award at the 2002 World Cup, thus becoming the only goalkeeper in the history of the competition to be selected as the best player of the tournament.

Matthäus was the inaugural winner of the FIFA World Player of the Year award in 1991, and is one of five Germany players to have been awarded Ballon d'Or; two of which, Franz Beckenbauer and Karl-Heinz Rummenigge, have each won the award twice. Beckenbauer was also voted in eighth place for the FIFA Player of the Century award, and was selected for the World Team of the 20th Century. Ten German players were named in the FIFA 100, a list of the 125 greatest living footballers chosen by former footballer Pelé, and ten are in the FIFA Century Club, having earned 100 or more caps. Lothar Matthäus's 150 international appearances make him the ninth-most capped player in world football, and Miroslav Klose's 71 goals is the eleventh-most of any international player.

Former captains of the national team may be awarded the title of honorary captain (German: Ehrenspielführer) by the German Football Association. To date, six former players of the men's team have received this award: Fritz Walter (1958), Uwe Seeler (1972), Franz Beckenbauer (1982), Lothar Matthäus (2001), Jürgen Klinsmann (2016) and Philipp Lahm (2017).

In total, 1,002 players have represented the Germany national team. This list covers players with twenty or more caps for the national team organised by the German Football Association, including West Germany. The players are initially ordered by number of caps (in descending order), then by alphabetical order of surname. All statistics are correct up to and including the match played on 16 November 2026 against Netherlands.

== Selection history ==
War and the political situation of Germany in the 20th century had an impact on the country's borders, as well as the make-up of the German football team. Germany played 30 internationals until the outbreak of the World War I, with the last match occurring on 5 April 1914 against the Netherlands. During the war, no internationals were played. In the new Weimar Republic, the team played its first post-war match on 27 June 1920 against Switzerland. Only six players that appeared before World War I returned to the post-war side: Otto Harder, Adolf Jäger, Eduard Pendorf, Hans Schmidt, Josef Schümmelfelder and Karl Wolter. After the Nazis came to power in January 1933, players of Jewish origin were banned from the team. Due to the annexation of Austria in 1938, the Austrian team was absorbed into the German team, resulting in the inclusion of several Austrians in Germany's squad at the 1938 World Cup. With the outbreak of World War II, Germany did not cease to play internationals, but was limited to facing neutral, allied and puppet states. The country played 35 internationals during the war, its last on 22 November 1942 against Slovakia.

After World War II and the team's reinstatement into FIFA, the German Football Association (DFB) was in charge of football in the Federal Republic and West Berlin. During this period, the team was commonly referred to as West Germany. The team played its first post-war international on 22 November 1950 against Switzerland. Only four players selected before the war were capped for the nation afterwards: Herbert Burdenski, Andreas Kupfer, Jakob Streitle and Fritz Walter. Due to the break-up of Germany, two breakaway national teams were formed: Saarland (in 1950) and East Germany (in 1952). Franz Immig of Saarland was the only player in either team to have been previously capped for Germany. Saarland played their final match in 1956, after which control of the Saar Protectorate was given to West Germany. Three of the Saar team's players later represented Germany: Karl Ringel, Gerhard Siedl and Heinz Vollmar. Upon Germany's reunification in 1990, the East Germany.. team was reintegrated into the Germany national team. Eight players capped for East Germany later appeared for the reunified team: Thomas Doll, Ulf Kirsten, Olaf Marschall, Matthias Sammer, Heiko Scholz, Dirk Schuster, Andreas Thom, Dariusz Wosz.

== Key ==
Positions key
GK	Goalkeeper
DF	Defender
MF	Midfielder
FW	Forward

Player
This colour background and the * symbol indicate that the player is currently active at the club level.
Position
Playing positions are listed according to the player's primary position while playing for the national team.
Caps and goals
Caps and goals comprise those in the qualifying and final tournaments of the FIFA World Cup and UEFA European Championship, as well as the Summer Olympics (pre-World War II), FIFA Confederations Cup, UEFA Nations League and international friendly matches.

== Players ==
Germany national football team players with at least 20 caps
Player	Pos.	Caps	Goals	Debut		Last or most recent match		Ref.
Player	Pos.	Caps	Goals	Date	Opponent	Date	Opponent	Ref.
Lothar Matthäus	MF	150	23	14 June 1980	Netherlands	20 June 2000	Portugal	
Miroslav Klose	FW	137	71	24 March 2001	Albania	13 July 2014	Argentina	
Thomas Müller *	FW	131	45	3 March 2010	Argentina	5 July 2024	Spain	
Lukas Podolski	FW	130	49	6 June 2004	Hungary	22 March 2017	England	
Manuel Neuer *	GK	128	0	2 June 2009	United Arab Emirates	29 June 2026	Paraguay	
Bastian Schweinsteiger	MF	121	24	6 June 2004	Hungary	31 August 2016	Finland	
Joshua Kimmich *	DF	118	10	29 May 2016	Slovakia	16 November 2026	Netherlands	
Toni Kroos	MF	114	17	3 March 2010	Argentina	5 July 2024	Spain	
Philipp Lahm	DF	113	5	18 February 2004	Croatia	13 July 2014	Argentina	
Jürgen Klinsmann	FW	108	47	12 December 1987	Brazil	4 July 1998	Croatia	
Jürgen Kohler	DF	105	2	24 September 1986	Denmark	4 July 1998	Croatia	
Per Mertesacker	DF	104	4	9 October 2004	Iran	13 July 2014	Argentina	
Franz Beckenbauer	DF	103	14	26 September 1965	Sweden	23 February 1977	France	
Thomas Häßler	MF	101	11	31 August 1988	Finland	20 June 2000	Portugal	
Michael Ballack	MF	98	42	28 April 1999	Scotland	3 March 2010	Argentina	
Berti Vogts	DF	96	1	3 May 1967	Yugoslavia	21 June 1978	Austria	
Sepp Maier	GK	95	0	4 May 1966	Republic of Ireland	26 May 1979	Iceland	
Karl-Heinz Rummenigge	FW	95	45	6 October 1976	Wales	29 June 1986	Argentina	
Mesut Özil	MF	92	23	11 February 2009	Norway	27 June 2018	South Korea	
Rudi Völler	FW	90	47	17 November 1982	Northern Ireland	10 July 1994	Bulgaria	
Andreas Brehme	DF	86	8	15 February 1984	Bulgaria	10 July 1994	Bulgaria	
Oliver Kahn	GK	86	0	23 June 1995	Switzerland	8 July 2006	Portugal	
Antonio Rüdiger *	DF	86	3	13 May 2014	Poland	29 June 2026	Paraguay	
Andreas Möller	MF	85	29	21 September 1988	Soviet Union	9 February 1999	Colombia	
Arne Friedrich	DF	82	1	21 August 2002	Bulgaria	3 June 2011	Austria	
İlkay Gündoğan *	MF	82	19	11 October 2011	Belgium	5 July 2024	Spain	
Karlheinz Förster	DF	81	2	5 April 1978	Brazil	29 June 1986	Argentina	
Wolfgang Overath	MF	81	17	28 September 1963	Turkey	7 July 1974	Netherlands	
Bernd Schneider	MF	81	4	28 July 1999	New Zealand	6 February 2008	Austria	
Leroy Sané *	FW	80	18	13 November 2015	France	29 June 2026	Paraguay	
Torsten Frings	MF	79	10	27 February 2001	France	11 February 2009	Norway	
Mario Gómez	FW	78	31	7 February 2007	Switzerland	27 June 2018	South Korea	
Mats Hummels	DF	78	5	13 May 2010	Malta	21 November 2023	Austria	
Sami Khedira	MF	77	7	5 September 2009	South Africa	27 June 2018	South Korea	
Jérôme Boateng	DF	76	1	10 October 2009	Russia	13 October 2018	Netherlands	
Guido Buchwald	DF	76	4	22 May 1984	Italy	10 July 1994	Bulgaria	
Toni Schumacher	GK	76	0	26 May 1979	Iceland	15 October 1986	Spain	
Leon Goretzka *	MF	73	15	13 May 2014	Poland	29 June 2026	Paraguay	
Pierre Littbarski	MF	73	18	14 October 1981	Austria	8 July 1990	Argentina	
Hans-Peter Briegel	MF	72	4	17 October 1979	Wales	29 June 1986	Argentina	
Uwe Seeler	FW	72	43	16 October 1954	France	9 September 1970	Hungary	
Christian Ziege	DF	72	9	10 June 1993	Brazil	27 May 2004	Malta	
Paul Janes	DF	71	7	30 October 1932	Hungary	22 November 1942	Slovakia	
Oliver Bierhoff	FW	70	37	21 February 1996	Portugal	30 June 2002	Brazil	
Manfred Kaltz	DF	69	8	3 September 1975	Austria	23 February 1983	Portugal	
Oliver Neuville	FW	69	10	2 September 1998	Malta	16 June 2008	Austria	
Stefan Reuter	DF	69	2	18 April 1987	Italy	15 June 1998	United States	
Thomas Helmer	DF	68	5	10 October 1990	Sweden	29 June 1998	Mexico	
Mario Götze *	MF	66	17	17 November 2010	Sweden	25 March 2023	Peru	
Horst-Dieter Höttges	DF	66	1	13 March 1965	Italy	22 June 1974	East Germany	
Willi Schulz	DF	66	0	20 December 1959	Yugoslavia	17 June 1970	Italy	
Christian Wörns	DF	66	0	22 April 1992	Czechoslovakia	3 September 2005	Slovakia	
Kai Havertz *	MF	65	25	9 September 2018	Peru	16 November 2026	Netherlands	
Ernst Lehner	FW	65	31	19 November 1933	Switzerland	1 November 1942	Croatia	
Thomas Berthold	DF	62	1	29 January 1985	Hungary	18 December 1994	Albania	
Serge Gnabry *	FW	62	26	11 November 2016	San Marino	1 October 2026	Serbia	
Gerd Müller	FW	62	68	12 October 1966	Turkey	7 July 1974	Netherlands	
Jens Lehmann	GK	61	0	18 February 1998	Oman	29 June 2008	Spain	
Fritz Walter	MF	61	33	14 July 1940	Romania	24 June 1958	Sweden	
Dietmar Hamann	MF	59	5	15 November 1997	South Africa	17 August 2005	Netherlands	
Andreas Köpke	GK	59	0	30 May 1990	Denmark	4 July 1998	Croatia	
Julian Draxler *	MF	58	7	26 May 2012	Switzerland	29 March 2022	Netherlands	
André Schürrle	FW	57	22	17 November 2010	Sweden	26 March 2017	Azerbaijan	
Timo Werner *	FW	57	24	22 March 2017	England	28 March 2023	Belgium	
Klaus Allofs	FW	56	17	11 October 1978	Czechoslovakia	31 March 1988	Sweden	
Jens Jeremies	MF	55	1	15 November 1997	South Africa	23 June 2004	Czech Republic	
Jonathan Tah *	DF	55	1	26 March 2016	England	16 November 2026	Netherlands	
Bodo Illgner	GK	54	0	23 September 1987	Denmark	10 July 1994	Bulgaria	
Rainer Bonhof	MF	53	9	26 May 1972	Soviet Union	7 January 1981	Brazil	
Bernard Dietz	DF	53	0	22 December 1974	Malta	19 May 1981	Brazil	
Wolfgang Weber	DF	53	2	29 April 1964	Czechoslovakia	23 February 1974	Spain	
Thomas Hitzlsperger	MF	52	6	9 October 2004	Iran	11 August 2010	Denmark	
Kevin Kurányi	FW	52	19	29 March 2003	Lithuania	6 September 2008	Liechtenstein	
Olaf Thon	MF	52	3	16 December 1984	Malta	25 June 1998	Iran	
Markus Babbel	DF	51	1	22 February 1995	Spain	17 June 2000	England	
Matthias Ginter *	DF	51	2	5 March 2014	Chile	12 June 2023	Ukraine	
Ulf Kirsten	FW	51	20	14 October 1992	Mexico	20 June 2000	Portugal	
Matthias Sammer	MF	51	8	19 December 1990	Switzerland	7 June 1997	Ukraine	
Herbert Erhardt	DF	50	1	11 October 1953	Saar	30 September 1962	Yugoslavia	
Florian Wirtz *	MF	50	15	2 September 2021	Liechtenstein	16 November 2026	Netherlands	
Niklas Süle	DF	49	1	31 August 2016	Finland	18 October 2023	Mexico	
Julian Brandt *	MF	48	3	29 May 2016	Slovakia	19 November 2024	Hungary	
Paul Breitner	DF	48	10	22 June 1971	Norway	11 July 1982	Italy	
Emre Can *	MF	48	2	4 September 2015	Poland	10 September 2024	Netherlands	
Jens Nowotny	DF	48	1	30 April 1997	Ukraine	16 August 2006	Sweden	
Marco Reus *	FW	48	15	7 October 2011	Turkey	11 November 2021	Liechtenstein	
Christoph Metzelder	DF	47	0	15 August 2001	Hungary	29 June 2008	Spain	
Karl-Heinz Schnellinger	DF	47	1	2 April 1958	Czechoslovakia	17 February 1971	Albania	
Marc-André ter Stegen *	GK	47	0	26 May 2012	Switzerland	16 November 2026	Netherlands	
Jamal Musiala *	MF	46	10	25 March 2021	Iceland	29 June 2026	Paraguay	
Carsten Ramelow	MF	46	3	10 October 1998	Turkey	28 April 2004	Romania	
Klaus Fischer	FW	45	32	27 April 1977	Northern Ireland	11 July 1982	Italy	
Marcell Jansen	DF	45	3	3 September 2005	Slovakia	5 March 2014	Chile	
Jürgen Grabowski	FW	44	5	4 May 1966	Republic of Ireland	7 July 1974	Netherlands	
Benedikt Höwedes	DF	44	2	29 May 2011	Uruguay	26 March 2017	Azerbaijan	
Albin Kitzinger	MF	44	2	25 August 1935	Romania	3 May 1942	Hungary	
Andreas Kupfer	DF	44	1	21 March 1937	Luxembourg	22 November 1950	Switzerland	
Hans-Georg Schwarzenbeck	DF	44	0	12 June 1971	Albania	22 February 1978	England	
Gerald Asamoah	FW	43	6	29 May 2001	Slovakia	6 September 2006	San Marino	
Jonas Hector	DF	43	3	14 November 2014	Gibraltar	19 November 2019	Northern Ireland	
Thomas Linke	DF	43	1	15 November 1997	South Africa	18 August 2004	Austria	
Felix Magath	MF	43	3	30 April 1977	Yugoslavia	29 June 1986	Argentina	
Horst Szymaniak	MF	43	2	21 November 1956	Switzerland	1 June 1966	Romania	
Hansi Müller	MF	42	5	5 April 1978	Brazil	7 September 1983	Hungary	
Karl-Heinz Riedle	FW	42	16	31 August 1988	Finland	7 September 1994	Russia	
Uli Stielike	MF	42	3	3 September 1975	Austria	12 September 1984	Argentina	
Sigfried Held	MF	41	5	23 February 1966	England	14 November 1973	Scotland	
Reinhold Münzenberg	DF	41	0	7 September 1930	Denmark	26 March 1939	Luxembourg	
Thomas Strunz	MF	41	1	10 October 1990	Sweden	8 September 1999	Northern Ireland	
Marco Bode	FW	40	9	15 December 1995	South Africa	30 June 2002	Brazil	
Bernhard Cullmann	DF	40	6	14 February 1973	Argentina	22 June 1980	Belgium	
Bernd Hölzenbein	FW	40	5	10 October 1973	Austria	21 June 1978	Austria	
Helmut Rahn	FW	40	21	21 November 1951	Turkey	27 April 1960	Portugal	
David Raum *	DF	40	1	5 September 2021	Armenia	4 October 2026	Greece	
Heinz Flohe	MF	39	8	22 November 1970	Greece	14 June 1978	Italy	
Ludwig Goldbrunner	DF	39	0	19 November 1933	Switzerland	20 October 1940	Bulgaria	
Matthias Herget	DF	39	4	26 October 1983	Turkey	21 September 1988	Soviet Union	
Jupp Heynckes	FW	39	14	22 February 1967	Morocco	17 November 1976	Czechoslovakia	
Hans Schäfer	FW	39	15	9 November 1952	Switzerland	10 June 1962	Yugoslavia	
Hans Tilkowski	GK	39	0	3 April 1957	Netherlands	8 April 1967	Albania	
Hans Jakob	GK	38	0	2 November 1930	Norway	24 September 1939	Hungary	
Fredi Bobic	FW	37	10	12 October 1994	Hungary	19 June 2004	Latvia	
Jörg Heinrich	MF	37	2	21 June 1995	Italy	18 May 2002	Austria	
Günter Netzer	MF	37	6	9 October 1965	Austria	11 October 1975	Greece	
Wolfgang Rolff	MF	37	0	23 February 1983	Portugal	26 April 1989	Netherlands	
Sebastian Deisler	MF	36	3	23 February 2000	Netherlands	1 March 2006	Italy	
Mehmet Scholl	MF	36	8	26 April 1995	Wales	13 February 2002	Israel	
Herbert Wimmer	MF	36	4	23 November 1968	Cyprus	20 June 1976	Czechoslovakia	
Stefan Effenberg	MF	35	5	5 June 1991	Wales	5 September 1998	Romania	
Uli Hoeneß	FW	35	5	29 March 1972	Hungary	17 November 1976	Czechoslovakia	
Marko Rehmer	DF	35	4	2 September 1998	Malta	15 November 2003	France	
Piotr Trochowski	MF	35	2	7 October 2006	Georgia	7 July 2010	Spain	
Fritz Szepan	MF	34	8	20 October 1929	Finland	22 October 1939	Bulgaria	
Tim Borowski	MF	33	2	21 August 2002	Bulgaria	19 June 2008	Portugal	
Bernd Förster	DF	33	0	22 May 1979	Republic of Ireland	20 June 1984	Spain	
Helmut Haller	MF	33	13	24 September 1958	Denmark	3 June 1970	Morocco	
Carsten Jancker	FW	33	10	14 October 1998	Moldova	16 October 2002	Faroe Islands	
Horst Eckel	MF	32	0	9 November 1952	Switzerland	19 November 1958	Austria	
Josef Posipal	DF	32	1	17 June 1951	Turkey	15 September 1956	Soviet Union	
Holger Badstuber	DF	31	1	29 May 2010	Hungary	25 March 2015	Australia	
Dieter Eilts	MF	31	0	18 December 1993	United States	7 June 1997	Ukraine	
Erich Juskowiak	DF	31	4	23 December 1951	Luxembourg	8 November 1959	Hungary	
Sebastian Kehl	MF	31	3	29 May 2001	Slovakia	8 July 2006	Portugal	
Nico Schlotterbeck *	DF	31	2	26 March 2022	Israel	16 November 2026	Netherlands	
Otto Siffling	FW	31	17	27 May 1934	Belgium	24 April 1938	Portugal	
Mario Basler	MF	30	2	23 March 1994	Italy	18 November 1998	Netherlands	
Sebastian Rudy	MF	29	1	13 May 2014	Poland	16 November 2019	Belarus	
Frank Baumann	MF	28	2	14 November 1999	Norway	26 March 2005	Slovenia	
Edmund Conen	FW	28	27	14 January 1934	Hungary	3 May 1942	Hungary	
Thilo Kehrer *	DF	28	0	9 September 2018	Peru	8 June 2025	France	
Klaus Augenthaler	DF	27	0	5 October 1983	Austria	8 July 1990	Argentina	
Wolfgang Dremmler	MF	27	3	7 January 1981	Brazil	29 February 1984	Belgium	
Heiko Westermann	DF	27	4	6 February 2008	Austria	19 November 2013	England	
Karl Hohmann	MF	26	20	7 September 1930	Denmark	25 June 1937	Latvia	
Stanislaus Kobierski	FW	26	9	27 September 1931	Denmark	5 October 1941	Finland	
Reinhard Libuda	FW	26	3	28 September 1963	Turkey	17 November 1971	Poland	
Max Morlock	FW	26	21	22 November 1950	Switzerland	28 December 1958	United Arab Republic	
Simon Rolfes	MF	26	2	28 March 2007	Denmark	15 November 2011	Netherlands	
Albert Brülls	MF	25	9	4 October 1959	Switzerland	16 July 1966	Argentina	
Niclas Füllkrug *	DF	25	14	13 November 2022	Oman	13 November 2026	Serbia	
Richard Hofmann	FW	25	24	2 October 1927	Denmark	19 March 1933	France	
Stefan Kuntz	FW	25	6	18 December 1993	United States	11 October 1997	Albania	
Hans Rohde	MF	25	0	27 September 1936	Luxembourg	22 November 1942	Slovakia	
Aki Schmidt	MF	25	8	3 April 1957	Netherlands	7 June 1964	Finland	
Erich Beer	MF	24	7	17 May 1975	Netherlands	21 June 1978	Austria	
Fabian Ernst	MF	24	1	9 May 2002	Kuwait	22 March 2006	United States	
Robin Gosens *	MF	24	2	3 September 2020	Spain	4 June 2025	Portugal	
Ludwig Leinberger	MF	24	0	2 October 1927	Denmark	1 January 1933	Italy	
Bernd Patzke	DF	24	0	13 March 1965	Italy	25 April 1971	Turkey	
Cacau	FW	23	6	29 May 2009	China	26 May 2012	Switzerland	
Klaus Fichtel	DF	23	1	22 February 1967	Morocco	17 November 1971	Poland	
Wilhelm Hahnemann	FW	23	16	4 June 1938	Switzerland	7 December 1941	Slovakia	
Jonas Hofmann *	MF	23	4	7 October 2020	Turkey	10 October 2023	Mexico	
Georg Knöpfle	MF	23	0	15 April 1928	Switzerland	1 January 1933	Italy	
Georg Stollenwerk	DF	23	2	23 December 1951	Luxembourg	23 March 1960	Chile	
Clemens Fritz	DF	22	2	7 October 2006	Georgia	15 October 2008	Wales	
Rudolf Gramlich	MF	22	0	27 September 1931	Denmark	7 August 1936	Norway	
Lukas Klostermann *	DF	22	0	20 March 2019	Serbia	12 June 2023	Ukraine	
Werner Kohlmeyer	DF	22	0	17 June 1951	Turkey	30 March 1955	Italy	
Steffen Freund	MF	21	0	22 February 1995	Spain	27 May 1998	Finland	
Fritz Herkenrath	GK	21	0	26 September 1954	Belgium	24 September 1958	Denmark	
Andreas Hinkel	DF	21	0	30 April 2003	Serbia and Montenegro	2 June 2009	United Arab Emirates	
Horst Hrubesch	FW	21	6	2 April 1980	Austria	11 July 1982	Italy	
Karl Mai	MF	21	1	11 October 1953	Saar	20 May 1959	Poland	
Bernd Schuster	MF	21	4	22 May 1979	Republic of Ireland	29 February 1984	Belgium	
Heinrich Stuhlfauth	GK	21	0	27 June 1920	Switzerland	2 March 1930	Italy	
Adolf Urban	FW	21	11	18 August 1935	Luxembourg	1 November 1942	Croatia	
Ottmar Walter	FW	21	10	22 November 1950	Switzerland	26 May 1956	England	
Rudolf Gellesch	FW	20	1	18 August 1935	Luxembourg	5 October 1941	Finland	
Ditmar Jakobs	DF	20	1	13 May 1980	Poland	29 June 1986	Argentina	
Hannes Löhr	FW	20	5	22 February 1967	Morocco	9 September 1970	Hungary	
Shkodran Mustafi	DF	20	2	13 May 2014	Poland	8 October 2017	Azerbaijan	
Rolf Rüssmann	DF	20	1	30 April 1977	Yugoslavia	15 November 1978	Hungary	
Toni Turek	GK	20	0	22 November 1950	Switzerland	16 October 1954	France	
