= 1959 DFB-Pokal final =

- Match programme cover
- Event: 1958–59 DFB-Pokal
| Schwarz-Weiß Essen | Borussia Neunkirchen |
| 5 | 2 |
- Date: 27 December 1959
- Venue: Auestadion, Kassel
- Referee: Gerhard Schulenburg (Hamburg)
- Attendance: 20,000

The 1959 DFB-Pokal final decided the winner of the 1958–59 DFB-Pokal, the 16th season of Germany's knockout football cup competition. It was played on 27 December 1959 at the Auestadion in Kassel. Schwarz-Weiß Essen won the match 5–2 against Borussia Neunkirchen, to claim their 1st cup title.

== Route to the final ==
The DFB-Pokal began with 5 teams in a single-elimination knockout cup competition. There were a total of two rounds leading up to the final. In the qualification round, all but two teams were given a bye. Teams were drawn against each other, and the winner after 90 minutes would advance. If still tied, 30 minutes of extra time was played. If the score was still level, a replay would take place at the original away team's stadium. If still level after 90 minutes, 30 minutes of extra time was played. If the score was still level, a drawing of lots would decide who would advance to the next round.

Note: In all results below, the score of the finalist is given first (H: home; A: away).

| Schwarz-Weiß Essen | | Round | Borussia Neunkirchen |
|---|---|---|---|---|
| Opponent | Result | 1958–59 DFB-Pokal | Opponent | Result |
| Hertha BSC (A) | 6–3 | Qualification round | Bye |
| Hamburger SV (A) | 2–1 (a.e.t.) | Semi-finals | VfR Mannheim (H) | 2–1 |

== Match ==
=== Details ===
27 December 1959
13:45 CET

| Schwarz-Weiß Essen | 5–2 | Borussia Neunkirchen |
|---|---|---|
| Rummel 25', 50'; Klöckner 66'; Trimhold 70'; Schieth 80' | Report | Emser 86' (pen.); Dörrenbacher 87' |

Auestadion, Kassel
Attendance: 20,000
Referee: Gerhard Schulenburg (Hamburg)

| Schwarz-Weiß Essen | Borussia Neunkirchen |

| GK | 1 | (West Germany) Hermann Merchel |
| RB | | (West Germany) Karl-Heinz Mozin |
| LB | | (West Germany) Gert Pips |
| RH | | (West Germany) Heinz Steinmann |
| CH | | (West Germany) Ede Kasperski (c) |
| LH | | (West Germany) Heinz Ingenbold |
| OR | | (West Germany) Horst Trimhold |
| IR | | (West Germany) Hubert Schieth |
| CF | | (West Germany) Manfred Rummel |
| IL | | (West Germany) Hans Küppers |
| OL | | (West Germany) Theo Klöckner |
Manager:
(West Germany) Hans Wendlandt

| GK | 1 | (West Germany) Ladislav Jirasek |
| RB | | (West Germany) Josef Frisch |
| LB | | (West Germany) Hans Schreier |
| RH | | (West Germany) Erich Leist |
| CH | | (West Germany) Gerd Lauck |
| LH | | (West Germany) Dieter Harig |
| OR | | (West Germany) Ewald Follmann |
| IR | | (West Germany) Horst Meurer |
| CF | | (West Germany) Werner Emser (c) |
| IL | | (West Germany) Rudi Dörrenbächer |
| OL | | (West Germany) Karl Ringel |
Manager:
(West Germany) Bernd Oles

Match rules

- 90 minutes.
- 30 minutes of extra time if necessary.
- Replay if scores still level.
- No substitutions.
