= 1951–52 Oberliga =

Oberliga
- Season: 1951–52
- Champions: Hamburger SV Tennis Borussia Berlin Rot-Weiss Essen: 1. FC Saarbrücken; VfB Stuttgart
- Relegated: Eintracht Braunschweig Victoria Hamburg Lüneburger SK Tasmania 1900 Berlin SC Westend 01 VfL Nord Berlin Rheydter SV Sportfreunde Hamborn VfR Frankenthal VfL Neustadt Eintracht Kreuznach SpVgg Weisenau Schwaben Augsburg VfL Neckarau
- German champions: VfB Stuttgart; 2nd German title
- Top goalscorer: Ernst-Otto Meyer (29 goals)

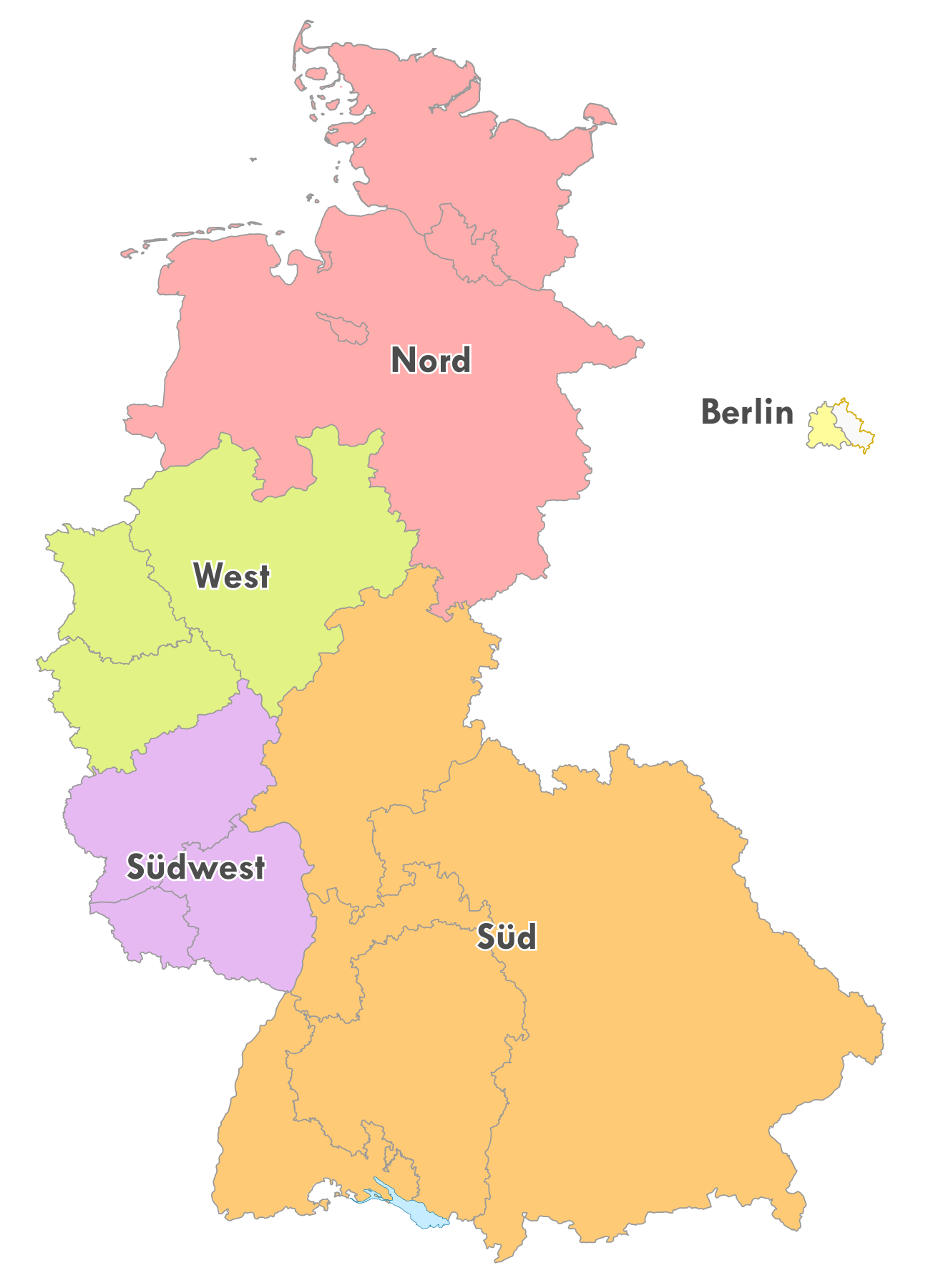
Map of the five German Oberligas 1945 to 1963

The 1951–52 Oberliga was the seventh season of the Oberliga, the first tier of the football league system in West Germany and the Saar Protectorate. The league operated in five regional divisions, Berlin, North, South, Southwest and West. The five league champions and the runners-up from the south, north and west then entered the 1952 German football championship which was won by VfB Stuttgart. It was VfB Stuttgart's second national championship, having previously won it in 1950.

The 1951–52 season saw the return of the clubs from the Saar Protectorate to the West German league system which had left in 1948, 1. FC Saarbrücken and Borussia Neunkirchen rejoining the Oberliga Südwest. Eventually, on 1 January 1957, the Saar Protectorate would officially join West Germany, ending the post-Second World War political separation of the territory from the other parts of Germany.

A similar-named league, the DDR-Oberliga, existed in East Germany, set at the first tier of the East German football league system. The 1951–52 DDR-Oberliga was won by Turbine Halle.

== Oberliga Nord ==
The 1951–52 season saw two new clubs in the league, Victoria Hamburg and Lüneburger SK, both promoted from the Amateurliga. The league's top scorer was Ernst-Otto Meyer of VfL Osnabrück with 29 goals, the highest total for the five Oberligas in 1951–52.

Pos	Team	Pld	W	D	L	GF	GA	GD	Pts	Promotion, qualification or relegation
1	Hamburger SV	30	19	7	4	96	46	+50	45	Qualification to German championship
2	VfL Osnabrück	30	18	5	7	79	50	+29	41	Qualification to German championship
3	FC St. Pauli	30	14	7	9	67	49	+18	35	
4	Eimsbütteler TV	30	15	5	10	71	58	+13	35	
5	Holstein Kiel	30	15	4	11	65	54	+11	34	
6	Göttingen 05	30	14	6	10	62	55	+7	34	
7	Werder Bremen	30	14	5	11	85	52	+33	33	
8	TuS Bremerhaven 93	30	12	9	9	63	56	+7	33	
9	Arminia Hannover	30	13	4	13	67	72	−5	30	
10	Bremer SV	30	11	6	13	60	59	+1	28	
11	Hannover 96	30	11	6	13	55	59	−4	28	
12	Concordia Hamburg	30	9	6	15	56	73	−17	24	
13	Eintracht Osnabrück	30	8	7	15	56	70	−14	23	
14	Eintracht Braunschweig (R)	30	8	7	15	50	72	−22	23	Relegation to Amateurliga
15	Victoria Hamburg (R)	30	7	9	14	48	74	−26	23	Relegation to Amateurliga
16	Lüneburger SK (R)	30	3	5	22	40	119	−79	11	Relegation to Amateurliga

Source: RSSSF.com
Rules for classification: 1) Points;
(R) Relegated

== Oberliga Berlin ==
The 1951–52 season saw two new clubs in the league, BFC Nordstern and VfL Nord Berlin, both promoted from the Amateurliga Berlin. The league's top scorer was Horst Schmutzler of Tennis Borussia Berlin with 25 goals.

Pos	Team	Pld	W	D	L	GF	GA	GD	Pts	Promotion, qualification or relegation
1	Tennis Borussia Berlin	26	19	4	3	78	21	+57	42	Qualification to German championship
2	Union 06 Berlin	26	18	3	5	72	35	+37	39	
3	Viktoria 89 Berlin	26	15	3	8	57	42	+15	33	
4	Hertha BSC Berlin	26	12	6	8	62	40	+22	30	
5	Alemannia 90 Berlin	26	12	6	8	48	40	+8	30	
6	Spandauer SV	26	11	7	8	48	36	+12	29	
7	Blau-Weiß 90 Berlin	26	12	4	10	40	44	−4	28	
8	Berliner SV 92	26	9	7	10	34	39	−5	25	
9	Wacker 04 Berlin	26	8	9	9	35	47	−12	25	
10	BFC Nordstern	26	10	4	12	47	48	−1	24	
11	Minerva 93 Berlin	26	10	3	13	45	45	0	23	
12	Tasmania 1900 Berlin (R)	26	9	5	12	36	54	−18	23	Relegation to Amateurliga Berlin
13	SC Westend 01 (R)	26	3	1	22	31	78	−47	7	Relegation to Amateurliga Berlin
14	VfL Nord Berlin (R)	26	2	2	22	21	85	−64	6	Relegation to Amateurliga Berlin

Source: RSSSF.com
Rules for classification: 1) Points;
(R) Relegated

== Oberliga West ==
The 1951–52 season saw three new clubs in the league, Meidericher SV, Bayer Leverkusen and Schwarz-Weiß Essen, all promoted from the 2. Oberliga West. The league's top scorer was Karl Hetzel of Meidericher SV with 25 goals.

Pos	Team	Pld	W	D	L	GF	GA	GD	Pts	Promotion, qualification or relegation
1	Rot-Weiss Essen	30	20	5	5	78	41	+37	45	Qualification to German championship
2	FC Schalke 04	30	18	4	8	63	47	+16	40	Qualification to German championship
3	Alemannia Aachen	30	16	4	10	65	47	+18	36	
4	Borussia Dortmund	30	13	8	9	79	53	+26	34	
5	1. FC Köln	30	13	7	10	57	40	+17	33	
6	Bayer Leverkusen	30	10	12	8	49	41	+8	32	
7	Preußen Münster	30	12	8	10	53	48	+5	32	
8	Meidericher SV	30	11	7	12	57	55	+2	29	
9	Preußen Dellbrück	30	9	11	10	42	48	−6	29	
10	Sportfreunde Katernberg	30	10	7	13	62	70	−8	27	
11	Schwarz-Weiß Essen	30	7	13	10	43	57	−14	27	
12	Fortuna Düsseldorf	30	8	10	12	43	48	−5	26	
13	STV Horst-Emscher	30	9	8	13	48	61	−13	26	
14	SpVgg Erkenschwick	30	6	12	12	53	71	−18	24	
15	Rheydter SV (R)	30	7	9	14	58	88	−30	23	Relegation to 2. Oberliga West
16	Sportfreunde Hamborn (R)	30	4	9	17	30	65	−35	17	Relegation to 2. Oberliga West

Source: RSSSF.com
Rules for classification: 1) Points;
(R) Relegated

== Oberliga Südwest ==
The 1951–52 season saw four new clubs in the league, VfR Frankenthal and SpVgg Weisenau promoted from the Amateurliga, while 1. FC Saarbrücken and Borussia Neunkirchen joined from the Ehrenliga Saarland. The league's top scorer was Gerhard Siedl of Borussia Neunkirchen with 27 goals.

Pos	Team	Pld	W	D	L	GF	GA	GD	Pts	Promotion, qualification or relegation
1	1. FC Saarbrücken	30	23	4	3	80	27	+53	50	Qualification to German championship
2	TuS Neuendorf	30	18	8	4	76	33	+43	44	
3	1. FC Kaiserslautern	30	18	5	7	102	36	+66	41	
4	Wormatia Worms	30	13	12	5	69	44	+25	38	
5	FK Pirmasens	30	16	2	12	80	51	+29	34	
6	Eintracht Trier	30	12	8	10	58	52	+6	32	
7	Borussia Neunkirchen	30	13	5	12	74	61	+13	31	
8	Phönix Ludwigshafen	30	12	7	11	58	56	+2	31	
9	TuRa Ludwigshafen	30	12	7	11	39	51	−12	31	
10	FSV Mainz 05	30	12	4	14	69	82	−13	28	
11	FV Engers	30	10	6	14	54	68	−14	26	
12	VfR Kaiserslautern	30	9	5	16	49	70	−21	23	
13	VfR Frankenthal (Note: VfR Frankenthal was retrospectively relegated from the league after the first round of the 1952–53 season for attempting to bribe 1. FC Saarbrücken to lose their game against Frankenthal during the 1951–52 season.) (R)	30	9	4	17	44	74	−30	22	Relegation to 2. Oberliga Südwest
14	VfL Neustadt (R)	30	7	8	15	41	78	−37	22	Relegation to 2. Oberliga Südwest
15	Eintracht Kreuznach (R)	30	7	5	18	45	85	−40	19	Relegation to 2. Oberliga Südwest
16	SpVgg Weisenau (R)	30	3	2	25	38	108	−70	8	Relegation to 2. Oberliga Südwest

Source: RSSSF.com
Rules for classification: 1) Points;
(R) Relegated

== Oberliga Süd ==
The 1951–52 season saw two new clubs in the league, Viktoria Aschaffenburg and Stuttgarter Kickers, both promoted from the 2. Oberliga Süd. The league's top scorers were Max Morlock (1. FC Nürnberg) and Helmut Preisendörfer (Kickers Offenbach) with 26 goals each.

Pos	Team	Pld	W	D	L	GF	GA	GD	Pts	Promotion, qualification or relegation
1	VfB Stuttgart (C)	30	17	10	3	60	24	+36	44	Qualification to German championship
2	1. FC Nürnberg	30	17	9	4	72	33	+39	43	Qualification to German championship
3	Kickers Offenbach	30	14	12	4	75	41	+34	40	
4	Eintracht Frankfurt	30	15	4	11	52	43	+9	34	
5	VfR Mannheim	30	10	12	8	64	60	+4	32	
6	SpVgg Fürth	30	10	10	10	46	42	+4	30	
7	FSV Frankfurt	30	10	10	10	45	58	−13	30	
8	FC Bayern Munich	30	11	7	12	53	54	−1	29	
9	VfB Mühlburg (Note: VfB Mühlburg merged with Phönix Karlsruhe to form Karlsruher SC.)	30	11	6	13	67	47	+20	28	
10	SV Waldhof Mannheim	30	10	8	12	49	61	−12	28	
11	Viktoria Aschaffenburg	30	8	12	10	45	70	−25	28	
12	Stuttgarter Kickers	30	11	5	14	61	63	−2	27	
13	TSV 1860 München	30	9	9	12	46	54	−8	27	
14	FC Schweinfurt 05	30	8	8	14	32	56	−24	24	
15	Schwaben Augsburg (R)	30	6	7	17	41	62	−21	19	Relegation to 2. Oberliga Süd
16	VfL Neckarau (R)	30	7	3	20	46	86	−40	17	Relegation to 2. Oberliga Süd

Source: RSSSF.com
Rules for classification: 1) Points;
(C) Champions; (R) Relegated

== German championship ==
The 1952 German football championship was contested by the eight qualified Oberliga teams and won by VfB Stuttgart, defeating 1. FC Saarbrücken in the final. The eight clubs played a home-and-away round of matches in two groups of four. The two group winners then advanced to the final.

=== Group 1 ===
Pos	Team	Pld	W	D	L	GF	GA	GD	Pts	Promotion, qualification or relegation
1	1.FC Saarbrücken (Q)	6	4	0	2	17	13	+4	8	Qualified for final
2	1. FC Nürnberg	6	3	1	2	18	13	+5	7	
3	Hamburger SV	6	3	0	3	16	15	+1	6	
4	FC Schalke 04	6	1	1	4	12	22	−10	3	

Source: RSSSF.com
Rules for classification: 1) Points;
(Q) Qualified for the phase indicated

=== Group 2 ===
Pos	Team	Pld	W	D	L	GF	GA	GD	Pts	Promotion, qualification or relegation
1	VfB Stuttgart (Q)	6	3	2	1	14	8	+6	8	Qualified for final
2	Rot-Weiss Essen	6	3	0	3	14	15	−1	6	
3	VfL Osnabrück	6	2	1	3	9	9	0	5	
4	Tennis Borussia Berlin	6	2	1	3	8	13	−5	5	

Source: RSSSF.com
Rules for classification: 1) Points;
(Q) Qualified for the phase indicated

=== Final ===
Team 1	Score	Team 2
VfB Stuttgart	3–2	1. FC Saarbrücken
