= 1958–59 DFB-Pokal =

Tournament details
- Country: West Germany
- Teams: 4

Final positions
- Champions: Schwarz-Weiß Essen
- Runner-up: Borussia Neunkirchen

Tournament statistics
- Matches played: 3
- Goals scored: 13 (4.33 per match)
- Top goal scorer(s): Manfred Rummel (4)

The 1958–59 DFB-Pokal was the 16th season of the annual German football cup competition. It began on 3 October 1959 and ended on 27 December 1959. Four teams competed in the tournament of two rounds. In the final Schwarz-Weiß Essen defeated Borussia Neunkirchen 5 – 2.

== Matches ==
=== Qualification round ===
16 August 1959

Hertha BSC	3 – 6	Schwarz-Weiß Essen
Faeder 26', 38'; Steinert 53'	report (in German)	Süß 4', 76'; Küppers 52', 63'; Rummel 73', 85'

Poststadion, Berlin
Attendance: 8.000
Referee: Gerhard Schulenburg (Hamburg)

=== Semi-finals ===
3 October 1959

Borussia Neunkirchen	2 – 1	VfR Mannheim
Ringel 57'; Follmann 68'	report (in German)	Schmitt 33'

Ellenfeldstadion, Neunkirchen
Attendance: 8.000
Referee: Schreiber
12 December 1959

Hamburger SV	1 – 2 (a.e.t.)	Schwarz-Weiß Essen
Wulf 62'	report (in German)	Rummel 65', 93'

Rothenbaum, Hamburg
Attendance: 15.000
Referee: Günter Sparing (Kassel)

=== Final ===
27 December 1959
13:45 CET

Schwarz-Weiß Essen	5–2	Borussia Neunkirchen
Rummel 25', 50'; Klöckner 66'; Trimhold 70'; Schieth 80'	Report	Emser 86' (pen.); Dörrenbacher 87'

Auestadion, Kassel
Attendance: 20,000
Referee: Gerhard Schulenburg (Hamburg)
