= List of foreign Ligue 1 players: G =

This is a list of foreign players in the French Ligue 1, which commenced play in 1932. The following players must meet both of the following two criteria:

1. Have played at least one Ligue 1 game. Players who were signed by Ligue 1 clubs, but only played in lower league, cup and/or European games, or did not play in any competitive games at all, are not included.
2. Are considered foreign, i.e., outside France and its dependencies (Guadeloupe, Martinique, Reunion Island or French Polynesia), determined by the following:

A player is considered foreign if he is not eligible to play for the national teams of France.

More specifically,

- If a player has been capped on international level, the national team is used; if he has been capped by more than one country, the highest level (or the most recent) team is used. These include French players with dual citizenship. Players who played for France but came as foreign players (such as Miguel Ángel Lauri) are also listed.
- If a player has not been capped on international level, his country of birth is used, except those who were born abroad from French parents or moved to France at a young age, and those who clearly indicated to have switched his nationality to another nation.

Clubs listed are those that the player has played at least one Ligue 1 game for.

Seasons listed are those that the player has played at least one Ligue 1 game in. Note that seasons, not calendar years, are used. For example, "1992–95" indicates that the player has played in every season from 1992–93 to 1994–95, but not necessarily every calendar year from 1992 to 1995.

In bold: players still active in Ligue 1 and their respective teams in current season.

== Gabon ==
- **Jim Allevinah** – Clermont, **Angers** – 2021–
- Pierre Aubameyang – Laval, Le Havre – 1984–89, 1991–94
- Pierre-Emerick Aubameyang – Lille, Monaco, Saint-Étienne, Marseille – 2009–13, 2023–24, 2025–26
- Shavy Babicka – Toulouse – 2023–25
- Stéphane Bégou – Toulon – 1983–84
- André Biyogo Poko – Bordeaux – 2011–16
- Denis Bouanga – Lorient, Nîmes, Saint-Étienne – 2014–16, 2018–22
- Moïse Brou Apanga – Brest – 2010–12
- Frédéric Bulot – Monaco, Caen, Reims – 2010–12, 2015–16
- Daniel Cousin – Lens – 2005–08
- Alan Do Marcolino – Rennes – 2022–23
- Bruno Ecuele Manga – Lorient, Dijon – 2010–14, 2019–21
- Jacques Ekomié – Angers – 2024–27
- Mario Lemina – Lorient, Marseille, Nice – 2012–16, 2021–23
- Yannis M'Bemba – Nantes – 2021–22
- Paul Manon – Reims – 1966–67
- Régis Manon – Tours – 1984–85
- Kevin Mayi – Saint-Étienne, Gazélec Ajaccio, Brest – 2011–13, 2015–16, 2019–20
- Urie-Michel Mboula – Metz – 2025–26
- Anthony Mfa Mezui – Metz – 2014–15
- Eric Mouloungui – Strasbourg, Nice – 2002–06, 2007–12
- Yrondu Musavu-King – Caen, Lorient, Toulouse – 2014–17
- Stéphane N'Guéma – Rennes – 2002–07
- Shiva N'Zigou – Nantes – 2002–04
- Didier Ndong – Lorient, Guingamp, Dijon – 2014–17, 2018–21
- Guy Roger Nzamba – Auxerre – 1992–93
- Johann Obiang – Troyes – 2017–18
- Royce Openda – Lorient – 2023–24
- Monday Ossey – Rennes, Toulouse FC (1937) – 1959–61
- Didier Ovono – Le Mans – 2009–10
- Lloyd Palun – Nice – 2010–15
- Yoann Wachter – Lorient – 2014–15

== Gambia ==
- Adama Bojang – Reims – 2023–24
- Mouhamadou Drammeh – Reims – 2020–21
- Ablie Jallow – Metz – 2017–18, 2023–24
- Saidy Janko – Saint-Étienne – 2017–18

== Georgia ==
- Giorgi Abuashvili – Metz – 2025–26
- Zuriko Davitashvili – Saint-Étienne – 2024–25
- Otar Dondua – Red Star – 1945–48
- Gia Guruli – Le Havre – 1992–94
- Jaba Kankava – Reims – 2015–16
- **Khvicha Kvaratskhelia** – **Paris SG** – 2024–
- Giorgi Kvilitaia – Metz – 2025–26
- Giorgi Makaridze – Le Mans – 2009–10
- Georges Mikautadze – Metz, Lyon – 2019–20, 2021–22, 2023–26
- Giorgi Tsitaishvili – Metz – 2025–26

== Germany ==
- Klaus Allofs – Marseille, Bordeaux – 1987–91
- Thomas Allofs – Strasbourg – 1989–90
- Oliver Bierhoff – Monaco – 2001–02
- Jérôme Boateng – Lyon – 2021–23
- **Paris Brunner** – **Monaco** – 2025–
- Emile Buhrer – Metz – 1932–33, 1935–36
- Kurt Clemens – FC Nancy – 1951–53
- Diego Contento – Bordeaux – 2014–18
- **Karim Coulibaly** – **Strasbourg** – 2026–
- Karl Dahlheimer – Fives – 1933–38
- Julian Draxler – Paris SG – 2016–22
- Ewald Follmann – Metz – 1949–50
- Karlheinz Förster – Marseille – 1986–90
- Dieter Hackl – Strasbourg – 1969–71, 1972–73
- Walter Hanke – Metz – 1935–37
- Ferdinand Heidkamp – Bastia, Lille OSC – 1973–77
- Wilhelm Heiss – Marseille – 1937–39
- Benjamin Henrichs – Monaco – 2018–20
- Otto Herbert – Le Havre – 1945–47
- Bernd Hobsch – Rennes – 1997–98
- Udo Horsmann – Rennes – 1983–84
- Reinhold Jackstell – Lens, Angers – 1953–54, 1956–57
- Klaus-Dieter Jank – Laval – 1983–84
- Moritz Jenz – Lorient – 2021–22
- Walter Kaiser – Rennes – 1932–37
- Manfred Kaltz – Bordeaux, Mulhouse – 1988–90
- Wolfgang Kaniber – Strasbourg – 1969–71
- Thilo Kehrer – Paris SG, Monaco – 2018–22, 2023–27
- Walter Kelsch – Strasbourg – 1984–86
- Reda Khadra – Reims, Le Havre – 2023–26
- Jürgen Klinsmann – Monaco – 1992–94
- Harald Klose – Valenciennes – 1970–71, 1972–73
- Andreas Köpke – Marseille – 1996–98
- Erwin Kostedde – Laval – 1979–80
- Peter Kracke – Angoulême – 1971–72
- Uwe Krause – Laval, Monaco, Sochaux – 1980–86
- Willibald Kreß – Mulhouse – 1932–33
- Mustafa Kučuković – Grenoble – 2009–10
- Edmund Kunkelmann – Strasbourg – 1951–52
- Herbert Laumen – Metz – 1974–75
- Bernd Lehmann – Strasbourg – 1975–76
- Reinhard Libuda – Strasbourg – 1972–73
- Kurt Linder – Lyon – 1962–63
- Pierre Littbarski – RC Paris – 1986–87
- Erich Maas – Nantes – 1970–75
- Caspar Memering – Bordeaux – 1982–84
- Franz Michelberger – Reims – 1978–79
- Arno Motschmann – Mulhouse, Valenciennes – 1932–33, 1935–36
- Youssoufa Moukoko – Nice – 2024–25
- Dieter Müller – Bordeaux – 1982–85
- Norbert Nachtweih – Cannes – 1989–91
- Alexander Nübel – Monaco – 2021–23
- Albert Osswald – Strasbourg – 1951–52
- Thomas Pfannkuch – Lyon – 1991–92
- Julian Pollersbeck – Lyon – 2021–22
- Fritz Raemer – Rennes – 1932–33
- Peter Reichert – Strasbourg, Toulouse – 1988–90
- Uwe Reinders – Bordeaux, Rennes – 1985–87
- Herbert Renner – Strasbourg – 1968–69
- Gernot Rohr – Bordeaux – 1977–89
- Oskar Rohr – Strasbourg – 1934–39
- **Niklas Schmidt** – **Toulouse** – 2023–25, 2026–
- Paul Schnoeck – Marseille, SC Nîmes – 1932–35
- Alfred Schön – Nancy – 1991–92
- Dieter Schurr – Strasbourg – 1969–71
- Thomas Seeliger – Nancy – 1991–92
- Karl-Heinz Spikofski – CO Roubaix-Tourcoing – 1952–54
- Heinz Stickel – Nancy – 1978–79
- Siegfried Susser – Strasbourg – 1983–84
- **Kevin Trapp** – Paris SG, **Paris FC** – 2015–18, 2025–
- Georg Tripp – Metz, Sedan – 1969–71
- Kevin Volland – Monaco – 2020–23
- Rudi Völler – Marseille – 1992–94
- Walter Vollweiler – Rennes – 1933–36
- Patrick Weiser – Rennes – 1997–99
- Roland Wohlfarth – Saint-Étienne – 1993–95
- Andreas Wolf – Monaco – 2013–14
- Christian Wörns – Paris SG – 1998–99

== Ghana ==
- **Salis Abdul Samed** – Clermont, Lens, **Nice** – 2021–24, 2025–
- Geoffrey Acheampong – Bastia – 2016–17
- Ishmael Addo – Bastia – 2001–02
- **Nathaniel Adjei** – **Lorient** – 2023–24, 2025–
- André Ayew – Marseille, Lorient, Le Havre – 2007–09, 2010–15, 2023–25
- Jordan Ayew – Marseille, Sochaux, Lorient – 2009–15
- Abdul Rahman Baba – Reims – 2018–19
- Anthony Baffoe – Metz, Nice – 1992–95
- Augustine Boakye – Saint-Étienne – 2024–25
- John Boye – Rennes, Metz – 2011–14, 2019–21
- Alexander Djiku – Bastia, Caen, Strasbourg – 2014–23
- Eben Dugbatey – Lorient – 1998–99
- Michael Essien – Bastia, Lyon – 2000–05
- **Abu Francis** – **Toulouse** – 2025–
- Asamoah Gyan – Rennes – 2008–11
- Samuel Inkoom – Bastia – 2012–13
- Gideon Mensah – Bordeaux, Auxerre – 2021–23, 2024–26
- John Mensah – Rennes, Lyon – 2005–09, 2011–13
- Jonathan Mensah – Evian – 2011–15
- Arthur Moses – Marseille – 1997–99
- Moussa Narry – Auxerre, Le Mans – 2008–10
- Kwame Nsor – Metz – 2014–15
- **Ernest Nuamah** – **Lyon** – 2023–
- Alex Nyarko – Lens, AS Monaco, Paris SG – 1998–2003
- Nicholas Opoku – Amiens – 2019–20
- Ibrahim Osman – Auxerre – 2025–26
- Elisha Owusu – Auxerre – 2024–26
- Abedi Pele – Marseille, Lille, Lyon – 1987–94
- Kojo Peprah Oppong – Nice – 2025–26
- Abeiku Quansah – Nice – 2008–11
- **Mohammed Salisu** – **Monaco** – 2023–
- **Alidu Seidu** – Clermont, Rennes, **Nice** – 2021–
- **Marvin Senaya** – Strasbourg, **Auxerre** – 2022–
- Kamaldeen Sulemana – Rennes – 2021–23
- Benjamin Tetteh – Metz – 2023–24
- Alhassan Wakaso – Lorient – 2016–17
- Abdul Majeed Waris – Lorient, Nantes, Strasbourg – 2015–17, 2018–22
- Yaw Yeboah – Lille – 2015–16
- Terry Yegbe – Metz – 2025–26

== Greece ==
- Angelos Basinas – Arles-Avignon – 2010–11
- Angelos Charisteas – Arles-Avignon – 2010–11
- Georges Chrysantis – Strasbourg – 1937–38
- Filippos Darlas – Brest – 2010–11
- Anastasios Donis – Nice, Reims – 2016–17, 2019–22
- Michalis Kapsis – Bordeaux – 2004–05
- **Panos Katseris** – **Lorient** – 2023–24, 2025–
- Efthymis Koulouris – Toulouse – 2019–20
- Kostas Mitroglou – Marseille – 2017–19
- Marinos Ouzounidis – Le Havre – 1997–99
- Panagiotis Retsos – Saint-Étienne – 2020–21
- Efstathios Tavlaridis – Lille, Saint-Étienne – 2004–10
- Guy-Victor Thomaïdis – Olympique Lillois – 1936–38
- Theocharis Tsingaras – Toulouse – 2022–23
- Akis Zikos – AS Monaco – 2002–06

== Guadeloupe ==
Note: As it is an overseas department of the French Republic, Guadeloupean players listed here must also have played with the Guadeloupe national team, which belongs to CONCACAF, although it is not a member of FIFA.

- Alexandre Alphonse – Brest – 2011–12
- Mickaël Alphonse – Dijon, Ajaccio – 2018–20, 2022–23
- Jocelyn Angloma – Lille, Paris SG, Marseille – 1989–94
- Taïryk Arconte – Brest – 2022–23
- Cédric Avinel – Ajaccio – 2022–23
- Claudio Beauvue – Bastia, Guingamp, Lyon, Caen – 2012–16, 2018–19
- Flavien Belson – Metz – 2005–06, 2007–08
- Aurélien Capoue – Nantes, Auxerre – 2004–07, 2008–10
- Dimitri Cavaré – Lens, Rennes – 2014–15, 2016–17
- Pascal Chimbonda – Le Havre; Bastia – 1999–2000, 2002–05
- Marcus Coco – Guingamp, Nantes – 2014–25
- Cédric Collet – Sedan – 2002–03
- Philippe Durpes – Lens – 1992–93, 1995–97
- Olivier Fauconnier – Le Havre, Nice, Ajaccio – 2002–03, 2004–05
- Dimitri Foulquier – Rennes, Strasbourg – 2011–14, 2017–18
- Andreaw Gravillon – Lorient, Reims – 2020–23
- Brice Jovial – Dijon – 2011–12
- **Rémy Labeau Lascary** – Lens, Brest, **Auxerre** – 2022–23, 2024–
- Jordan Leborgne – Caen – 2015–18
- Ulick Lupede – Le Mans – 2003–04
- Yvann Maçon – Saint-Étienne – 2019–22, 2024–25
- Livio Nabab – Caen – 2008–09, 2010–12
- Lenny Nangis – Caen, Lille, Bastia – 2011–12, 2014–17
- Loïc Nestor – Le Havre – 2008–09
- Therry Racon – Marseille – 2003–04
- Richard Socrier – Metz, Ajaccio – 2004–05, 2011–12
- David Sommeil – Caen, Rennes, Bordeaux, Marseille, Valenciennes – 1993–95, 1996–97, 1998–2004, 2007–09
- Mickaël Tacalfred – Reims – 2012–16
- Jordan Tell – Caen, Rennes, Clermont – 2016–18, 2021–22
- Yohann Thuram-Ulien – Monaco, Troyes – 2008–10, 2012–13
- Ronald Zubar – Caen, Marseille, Ajaccio – 2004–05, 2006–09, 2012–14

== Guinea ==
- Abdallah Bah – Nice – 1995–96
- Mamadou Bah – Strasbourg – 2007–08
- Schuman Bah – Metz – 2000–03
- Aliou Baldé – Nice – 2023–24
- Bobo Baldé – Toulouse FC, Valenciennes – 2000–01, 2009–11
- Abdoul Karim Bangoura – Martigues – 1994–96
- Amara Karba Bangoura – Valenciennes – 2008–10
- Ibrahima Bangoura – Troyes – 2001–03, 2005–07
- Ismaël Bangoura – Le Mans, Rennes, FC Nantes – 2005–07, 2009–11, 2013–16
- Lass Bangoura – Reims – 2015–16
- Mohamed Bayo – Clermont, Lille, Le Havre – 2021–25
- Abdoul Camara – Rennes, Sochaux, Angers, Guingamp – 2008–09, 2010–14, 2015–16, 2017–18
- Demba Camara – AC Ajaccio – 2013–14
- Ibrahima Camara – Le Mans – 2006–10
- **Issiaga Camara** – **Nice** – 2024–25
- Mo Camara – Le Havre – 1997–98
- Mohamed Camara – Troyes – 2012–13
- Ousmane Camara – Auxerre – 2022–23
- Titi Camara – Saint-Étienne, Lens, Marseille – 1990–99
- Sidiki Cherif – Angers – 2024–26
- Amadou Cissé – Strasbourg – 2025–26
- Ibrahim Cissoko – Toulouse – 2023–24
- Kévin Constant – Toulouse FC – 2007–08
- Antoine Conte – Paris SG, Reims – 2012–16
- Yadaly Diaby – Clermont – 2021–22
- Lamine Diaby-Fadiga – Nice – 2018–19
- Mouctar Diakhaby – Lyon – 2016–18
- Ibrahim Diakité – Reims – 2021–24
- Mamadou Diallo – Sochaux – 2012–13
- Sadio Diallo – Rennes, Lorient, Bastia – 2012–17
- Kaba Diawara – Bordeaux, Rennes, Marseille, Paris SG, Nice, Ajaccio, Arles-Avignon – 1996–2000, 2002–06, 2010–11
- **Kandet Diawara** – Le Havre, **Troyes** – 2024–25, 2026–
- Simon Falette – Lorient, Metz – 2011–12, 2016–18
- Pascal Feindouno – Bordeaux, Lorient, Saint-Étienne – 1998–2009
- Simon Feindouno – Lens – 2007–08
- Morgan Guilavogui – Lens – 2023–24, 2025–26
- Serhou Guirassy – Lille, Amiens, Rennes – 2015–16, 2018–23
- Daouda Jabi – Lens, Ajaccio – 2000–06
- Julian Jeanvier – Nancy, Auxerre – 2012–13, 2022–23
- Mohamed Kaba – Nantes – 2025–26
- Sory Kaba – Dijon – 2018–19
- Oumar Kalabane – Auxerre – 2005–07
- François Kamano – Bastia, Bordeaux – 2014–20
- Jules Keita – Dijon – 2018–20
- Bengali-Fodé Koita – Montpellier, Caen – 2009–12, 2014–15
- Ibrahim Koné – Boulogne – 2009–10
- Guy-Michel Landel – Le Mans – 2009–10
- Fodé Mansaré – Montpellier, Toulouse FC – 2001–04, 2005–11
- Mohamed Mara – Lorient – 2016–17
- Mamadou N'Diaye – Lille OSC – 1971–72
- Florentin Pogba – Saint-Étienne – 2013–18
- Baïssama Sankoh – Guingamp, Caen – 2013–15, 2016–19
- Ernest Seka – Strasbourg – 2017–18
- Michel Soumah – Limoges – 1960–61
- Morlaye Soumah – Bastia – 1995–2003
- Ousmane Soumah – Bastia, Lorient – 1994–2002
- Richard Soumah – Brest – 2010–13
- Abdoul Salam Sow – Martigues – 1995–96
- Saïdou Sow – Saint-Étienne, Strasbourg, Nantes – 2020–22, 2023–25
- Abdoulaye Sylla – Nantes – 2021–22
- **Dembo Sylla** – **Lorient** – 2023–24, 2026–
- Issiaga Sylla – Toulouse FC, Gazélec Ajaccio, Lens, Montpellier – 2012–21, 2022–25
- Mohamed Sylla – Martigues – 1995–96
- Mohammed Sylla – Le Havre – 1998–99
- Abdoulaye Touré – Nantes, Le Havre – 2013–14, 2015–21, 2023–26
- Larsen Touré – Lille OSC, Grenoble, Brest – 2005–06, 2007–13
- Mady Touré – Brest – 1982–85
- Amadou Traoré – Bordeaux – 2020–22
- Abdoulaye Yansané – Aix – 1967–68
- Mohamed Yattara – Troyes, Lyon, Angers – 2012–13, 2014–16
- Souleymane Youla – Metz, Lille OSC – 2005–08
- Kamil Zayatte – Lens – 2005–06

== Guinea–Bissau ==
- **Mama Baldé** – Dijon, Troyes, Lyon, **Brest** – 2019–
- Bocundji Cá – Nantes, AS Nancy, Reims – 2004–07, 2009–10, 2012–15
- Fali Candé – Metz – 2021–22, 2023–24
- Basile de Carvalho – Sochaux – 2002–05
- Moreto Cassamá – Reims – 2019–22
- Edmilson Correia – Saint-Étienne – 2019–20
- Ouparine Djoco – Clermont – 2021–23
- Esmaël Gonçalves – Nice – 2010–12
- Edgar Ié – Lille, Nantes – 2017–19
- Jorginho – Saint-Étienne – 2016–17
- Houboulang Mendes – Lorient – 2020–22
- Alexandre Mendy – Nice, Guingamp, Bordeaux, Brest – 2015–20
- Judilson Pelé – Monaco – 2018–19

== References and notes ==
=== Books ===
- Barreaud, Marc (1998). Dictionnaire des footballeurs étrangers du championnat professionnel français (1932-1997). L'Harmattan, Paris. ISBN 2-7384-6608-7.
- Tamás Dénes; Pál Peterdi; Zoltán Rochy; József Selmeci (1999). Kalandozó magyar labdarúgók. ISBN 963-85967-0-8.

=== Club pages ===
- AJ Auxerre former players
- AJ Auxerre former players
- Girondins de Bordeaux former players
- Girondins de Bordeaux former players
- Les ex-Tangos (joueurs), Stade Lavallois former players
- Olympique Lyonnais former players
- Olympique de Marseille former players
- FC Metz former players
- AS Monaco FC former players
- Ils ont porté les couleurs de la Paillade... Montpellier HSC Former players
- AS Nancy former players
- FC Nantes former players
- Paris SG former players
- Red Star Former players
- Red Star former players
- Stade de Reims former players
- Stade Rennais former players
- CO Roubaix-Tourcoing former players
- AS Saint-Étienne former players
- Sporting Toulon Var former players

=== Others ===
- stat2foot
- footballenfrance
- French Clubs' Players in European Cups 1955-1995, RSSSF
- Finnish players abroad, RSSSF
- Italian players abroad, RSSSF
- Romanians who played in foreign championships
- Swiss players in France, RSSSF
- EURO 2008 CONNECTIONS: FRANCE, Stephen Byrne Bristol Rovers official site

=== Notes ===
1. Born in Belgium
2. Born in Bosnia and Herzegovina (then part of SFR Yugoslavia)
3. Born in Cameroon
4. Born in England
5. Born in France
6. Born in Guinea-Bissau
7. Born in Israel
8. Born in Ivory Coast
9. Born in Niger
10. Born in Portugal
11. Born in Réunion (Overseas department of the French Republic)
12. Born in Russia (then part of the Soviet Union)
13. Born in Senegal
14. Born in Sierra Leone
15. Born in South Africa
16. Born in Switzerland
17. Born in West Germany (now part of Germany)
18. Capped for the France national football team
19. Capped for the France national under-21 football team
20. Capped for the France national under-20 football team
21. Capped for the France national under-19 football team
22. Capped for the France national under-18 football team
23. Capped for the France national under-17 football team
24. Capped for the France national under-16 football team
25. Capped for the Ivory Coast national under-20 football team
26. Capped for the Portugal national football team
27. Capped for the Portugal national under-23 football team
28. Capped for the Portugal national under-21 football team
29. Capped for the Portugal national under-20 football team
30. Capped for the Portugal national under-19 football team
31. Capped for the Portugal national under-18 football team
32. Capped for the Portugal national under-17 football team
33. Capped for the Portugal national under-16 football team
34. Capped for the Portugal national under-15 football team
35. Capped for the Senegal national under-17 football team
36. Capped for the Switzerland national under-21 football team
37. Capped for the Switzerland national under-20 football team
38. Capped for the Switzerland national under-19 football team
39. Capped for the Switzerland national under-18 football team
