= Klauck =

Klauck is a surname of German origin. Notable people with the surname include:

- Hans-Josef Klauck (1946–2025), German-born theologian, religious historian, and Franciscan priest
- Horst Klauck (1931–2004), German footballer
