= Werner Otto =

Werner Otto may refer to:

- Werner Otto (entrepreneur) (1909–2011), German founder of the Otto Group
- Werner Otto (cyclist) (born 1948), German track cyclist
- Werner Otto (footballer) (1929–2025), German footballer
