= Peter Krieger =

Peter Krieger may refer to:

- Peter Krieger (footballer) (1929–1981), German footballer
- Peter Krieger (ice hockey) (born 1993), American professional ice hockey forward
