= Erwin Wilhelm =

German footballer

Personal information
- Date of birth: 6 September 1926
- Date of death: 16 February 2012 (aged 85)
- Position: Defender

Senior career*
Years	Team	Apps	(Gls)
1950–1952	Borussia Neunkirchen		

International career
1951	Saarland	1	(0)
- * Club domestic league appearances and goals

Erwin Wilhelm (6 September 1926 – 16 February 2012) was a German former footballer who played for Borussia Neunkirchen and the Saarland national team as a defender.
