= Josef Schümmelfelder =

German footballer

Personal information
- Date of birth: 31 October 1891
- Date of death: 12 February 1966 (aged 74)
- Position: Midfielder

Senior career*
Years	Team	Apps	(Gls)
- Bonner FV

International career
1913–1921	Germany	5	(0)
- * Club domestic league appearances and goals

Josef Schümmelfelder (31 October 1891 – 12 February 1966) was a German international footballer.
