= Horst Borcherding =

German footballer

Personal information
- Date of birth: 8 October 1930
- Place of birth: Osnabrück, Weimar Republic
- Date of death: 9 February 2015 (aged 84)
- Place of death: Osnabrück, Germany
- Position: Goalkeeper

Senior career*
Years	Team	Apps	(Gls)
1952–1956	SV Saar 05 Saarbrücken	114	(0)
1956–1962	VfL Osnabrück	140	(0)
Total		254	(0)

International career
1954–1956	Saarland	3	(0)
- * Club domestic league appearances and goals

Horst Borcherding (8 October 1930 – 9 February 2015) was a German footballer who played as a goalkeeper.

== Career ==
Borcherding played club football for SV Saar 05 Saarbrücken and VfL Osnabrück, and played international football for Saarland.

== Later life and death ==
He died on 9 February 2015, at the age of 84.
