= Manfred Ebert =

German footballer

Personal information
- Date of birth: 6 December 1935
- Date of death: 24 December 2003 (aged 68)
- Position: Forward

Senior career*
| Years | Team | Apps | (Gls) |
| 1952–1957 | 1. FC Saarbrücken | | |
| 1957–1958 | FV Speyer | | |
| 1958–1959 | 1. FC Saarbrücken | | |
| 1959–1960 | FV Speyer | | |

International career
| 1956 | Saarland | 2 | (0) |
- * Club domestic league appearances and goals

Manfred Ebert (6 December 1935 – 24 December 2003) was a German footballer who played for 1. FC Saarbrücken, FV Speyer and the Saarland national team as a forward.
