= Helmut Fottner =

German footballer (1927–2009)

Personal information
- Date of birth: 24 December 1927
- Place of birth: Munich, Weimar Republic
- Date of death: 1 September 2009 (aged 81)
- Position: Forward

Senior career*
Years	Team	Apps	(Gls)
1947–1952	1860 Munich		
1952–1954	SV Saar 05 Saarbrücken		
1956–1957	Rot-Weiss Essen		
1957–1958	Sportclub Enschede		
1958–1959	GVAV		

International career
1953–1954	Saarland	2	(0)
- * Club domestic league appearances and goals

Helmut Fottner (24 December 1927 – 1 September 2009) was a German footballer who played for 1860 Munich, SV Saar 05 Saarbrücken, Rot-Weiss Essen, Sportclub Enschede, GVAV and the Saarland national team as a forward.
