= Karl-Heinz Kunkel =

German footballer

Personal information
- Date of birth: 4 September 1926
- Date of death: 18 July 1994 (aged 67)
- Position: Forward

International career
Years	Team	Apps	(Gls)
1956	Saarland	1	(0)

Karl-Heinz Kunkel (4 September 1926 – 18 July 1994) was a German footballer who played for the Saarland national team as a forward.
