= Walter Riedschy =

German footballer

Personal information
- Date of birth: 16 April 1925
- Date of death: 5 April 2011 (aged 85)
- Position: Defender

Senior career*
Years	Team	Apps	(Gls)
1952–1959	SV Saar 05 Saarbrücken		

International career
1955	Saarland	1	(0)
- * Club domestic league appearances and goals

Walter Riedschy (16 April 1925 – 5 April 2011) was a German footballer who played for SV Saar 05 Saarbrücken and the Saarland national team as a defender.
