= Dieter Honecker =

German footballer (1930–2012)

Personal information
- Date of birth: 23 October 1930
- Date of death: 29 July 2012 (aged 81)
- Position: Forward

Senior career*
| Years | Team | Apps | (Gls) |
| 1952–1958 | SV Saar 05 Saarbrücken | | |

International career
| 1956 | Saarland | 1 | (0) |
- * Club domestic league appearances and goals

Dieter Honecker (23 October 1930 – 29 July 2012) was a German footballer who played for SV Saar 05 Saarbrücken and the Saarland national team as a forward.
