= Karl Schirra =

German footballer

Personal information
- Date of birth: 16 October 1928
- Date of death: 12 September 2010 (aged 81)
- Position: Forward

Senior career*
Years	Team	Apps	(Gls)
1950–1953	Borussia Neunkirchen		
1953–1959	1. FC Saarbrücken		

International career
1950–1954	Saarland	6	(0)
1955	Saarland B	1	(1)
- * Club domestic league appearances and goals

Karl Schirra (16 October 1928 – 12 September 2010) was a German footballer who played for Borussia Neunkirchen, 1. FC Saarbrücken and the Saarland national team as a forward.
