= Hermann Monter =

German footballer

Personal information
- Date of birth: 13 December 1926
- Date of death: 23 September 1999 (aged 72)
- Position: Forward

Senior career*
| Years | Team | Apps | (Gls) |
| 1952–1958 | SV Saar 05 Saarbrücken | 106 | (12) |

International career
| 1954–1955 | Saarland | 2 | (0) |
- * Club domestic league appearances and goals

Hermann Monter (13 December 1926 – 23 September 1999) was a German footballer who played for SV Saar 05 Saarbrücken and the Saarland national team as a forward.
