= Werner Prauss =

German footballer

Personal information
- Date of birth: 26 October 1933
- Date of death: 7 March 2013 (aged 79)
- Position: Defender

Senior career*
Years	Team	Apps	(Gls)
1957–1962	1. FC Saarbrücken		

International career
1956	Saarland	1	(0)
- * Club domestic league appearances and goals

Werner Prauss (26 October 1933 – 7 March 2013) was a German footballer who played for 1. FC Saarbrücken and the Saarland national team as a defender.
