= Hans Bild =

German footballer

Personal information
- Date of birth: 7 March 1921
- Date of death: 15 May 2004 (aged 83)
- Position: Forward

Senior career*
Years	Team	Apps	(Gls)
1950–1952	Borussia Neunkirchen		

International career
1951	Saarland	2	(0)
- * Club domestic league appearances and goals

Hans Bild (7 March 1921 – 15 May 2004) was a German footballer who played for Borussia Neunkirchen and the Saarland national team as a forward.
