= Heinrich Schmidt (footballer) =

German footballer

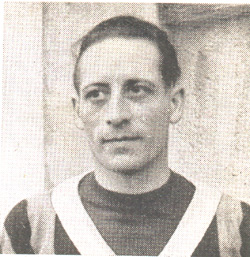
- 1940s

Personal information
- Date of birth: 10 January 1912
- Place of birth: Gersweiler, German Empire
- Date of death: 16 August 1988 (aged 76)
- Position: Defender

Senior career*
Years	Team	Apps	(Gls)
- 1. FC Saarbrücken

International career
1950	Saarland	1	(0)
- * Club domestic league appearances and goals

Heinrich Schmidt (10 January 1912 – 16 August 1988) was a German footballer who played for Borussia Neunkirchen, 1. FC Saarbrücken and the Saarland national team as a defender.
