= SV St. Ingbert 1945 =

German football club

SV St. Ingbert
- Full name: Sportverein Sankt Ingbert 1945 e.V.
- Founded: 1945
- Manager: Klaus Moscherosch
- League: Verbandsliga Nordost (VII)
- 2015–16: 14th
Home colours	Away colours

SV St. Ingbert is a German association football club from the city of St. Ingbert, Saarland. The club is a successor to Fußball Club Viktoria St. Ingbert established 19 August 1909. Viktoria was joined by FC Bavaria St. Ingbert in 1917. In 1937, a number of local sides were merged to form Verein für Leibesübungen St. Ingbert.

The club was re-established following World War II in 1945 as Sportverein St. Ingbert in what was the French-administered Saar Protectorate. Part of the membership left on 7 August 1948 to form 1. FC St. Ingbert which was renamed on 5 March 1950 to FC Viktoria 09 St. Ingbert and remains active today.

== History ==
Although still considered part of Germany, the Saar Protectorate was subject after the war to attempts to make it part of France or create a separate country there until it was re-united with Germany following a 1955 plebiscite. This was manifested in football through the establishment of a league structure separate from Germany's German Football Association (Deutsche Fussball Bund), the appearance of the region's top sides in French competition, and the formation of a national side that took part in qualification play for the 1954 FIFA World Cup.

A first division football circuit known as the Ehrenliga made up of German clubs was established in the Saarland in 1948 and was active through to the end of the 1950–51 season when the state's regional football competition was re-integrated with Germany's as the Amateurliga Saarland. During this period SV rose out of the Bewährungsklasse Saar, Gruppe Ost to play in the final Ehrenliga season before continuing on in the now third tier Amateurliga. Club footballer Heinz Vollmar was capped four times in 1955 and 1956 as part of Saarland's short-lived national side.

In 1956, following their Amateurliga championship the previous season, St. Ingbert moved up to the 2. Oberliga Südwest. They claimed a title there in 1957 and were again promoted, this time to the top-flight Oberliga Südwest. Their stay in the first division was brief as they were immediately relegated. The club played second-tier football until slipping to the Amateurliga Saarland (III) in 1964 where they would compete for most of the next decade and a half. St. Ingbert took part in the opening rounds of the national amateur championship in 1965, 1967 and 1969.

They fielded strong sides throughout the 1960s, but their performance fell off in the 1970s as they became a lower table club and spent two seasons in the fourth tier. The only bright spot was a 1974 Amateurliga title claimed in 1974 and another appearance in the first round of the national amateur championship. SV were relegated again in 1979, to the Verbandsliga Saarland (IV), and by 1983 had fallen all the way to the Bezirksliga Saarland (VI). The club made its only appearance in play for the DFB-Pokal (German Cup) in 1988 and went out in the opening round to Union Solingen.

Over the next two decades St. Ingbert was an elevator club moving frequently up and down between divisions. By 2008, they had slipped to the Kreisliga Ostsaar (IX), Staffel Höcherberg where they earned a second-place result in 2006–07, before winning the league the year after and moving up to Bezirksliga (VIII) play. After a title in the Landesliga in 2013 the club moved up to the Verbandsliga, now the seventh tier, in 2013 where it plays today.

== Honours ==
- Bewährungsklasse Saarland
  - Champions: 1950
- Amateurliga Saarland (III)
  - Champions: 1955, 1974
- 2. Oberliga Südwest (II)
  - Champions: 1957
- Bezirksliga Saarland (VII)
  - Champions: 1983, 1998
- Landesliga Saarland (VI)
  - Champions: 1984, 1999, 2013

== Notable players ==
- Striker Heinz Vollmar was capped for the short-lived Saarland national side and scored four goals in his four appearances. He later represented West Germany, earning another dozen caps and scoring three goals.
