= Willi Sippel =

German footballer

Personal information
- Date of birth: 20 March 1929 (age 97)
- Position: Defender

Senior career*
Years	Team	Apps	(Gls)
1950–1953	1. FC Nürnberg		
1953–1955	Borussia Neunkirchen		

International career
1954–1955	Saarland	4	(0)
- * Club domestic league appearances and goals

Willi Sippel (born 20 March 1929) is a German former footballer who played for 1. FC Nürnberg, Borussia Neunkirchen and the Saarland national team as a defender.
