= Heinz Schussig =

German footballer (1926–1994)

Personal information
- Date of birth: 9 October 1926
- Place of birth: Dortmund, Germany
- Date of death: 4 January 1994 (aged 67)
- Place of death: Canberra, Australia
- Position: Defender

Senior career*
| Years | Team | Apps | (Gls) |
| 1949–1951 | Arminia Bielefeld | | |
| 1951–1952 | Eintracht Osnabrück | | |
| 1952–1956 | SV Saar 05 Saarbrücken | | |
| 1957–1959 | Hakoah Club | | |
| 1960–1961 | Napad | | |
| 1963–1965 | Concordia | | |

International career
| 1952–1955 | Saarland | 3 | (0) |
| 1955 | Saarland B | 1 | (0) |
- * Club domestic league appearances and goals

Heinz Schussig (9 October 1926 – 4 January 1994) was a German footballer who played as a defender for Arminia Bielefeld, Eintracht Osnabrück, SV Saar 05 Saarbrücken and the Saarland national team.

In 1956 he emigrated to Australia. With Hakoah he won the Kennard Cup in 1957. He later moved to Canberra where he played for Australian Capital Territory first division clubs Napad and Concordia.
