= Franz Immig =

German footballer

Personal information
- Date of birth: 10 September 1918
- Place of birth: Sondernheim, Germany
- Date of death: 26 December 1955 (aged 37)

Senior career*
Years	Team	Apps	(Gls)
1937–1940	Karlsruher FV		
1940–1948	Stuttgarter Kickers		
1948–1952	1. FC Saarbrücken		

International career
1939	Germany	2	(0)
1951–1952	Saarland	3	(0)
- * Club domestic league appearances and goals

Franz Immig (10 September 1918 – 26 December 1955) was a footballer who played international football for both Germany and Saarland. Born in Sondernheim, Immig played for Karlsruher FV, Stuttgarter Kickers and 1. FC Saarbrücken.
