= Robert Niederkirchner =

German footballer

Personal information
- Date of birth: 6 June 1924
- Date of death: 2004 (aged 79–80)
- Position: Forward

Senior career*
Years	Team	Apps	(Gls)
1952–1957	SV Saar 05 Saarbrücken		

International career
1954	Saarland	1	(1)
1955	Saarland B	1	(0)
- * Club domestic league appearances and goals

Robert Niederkirchner (6 June 1924 – 2004) was a German footballer who played for SV Saar 05 Saarbrücken and the Saarland national team as a forward.
