= Saarland national football team =

National association football team

Saarland
1950–1956
- Association: Saarländischer Fussball-Verband (SFV)
- Confederation: UEFA (Europe)
- Head coach: Helmut Schön
- Most caps: Waldemar Philippi (18)
- Top scorer: Herbert Binkert; Herbert Martin (6)
- Home stadium: Ludwigspark Stadion
- FIFA code: SAA
First colours	Second colours

First international
- Saar 5–3 Switzerland B (Saarbrücken, Saar; 22 November 1950); A full international Norway 2–3 Saar (Oslo, Norway; 24 June 1953)

Last international
- Netherlands 3–2 Saar (Amsterdam, Netherlands; 6 June 1956)

Biggest win
- Switzerland B 2–5 Saar (Bern, Switzerland; 15 September 1951); A full international Norway 2–3 Saar (Oslo, Norway; 24 June 1953)

Biggest defeat
- Saar 1–7 Uruguay (Saarbrücken, Saar; 5 June 1954)

The Saarland national football team (German: Saarländische Fußballnationalmannschaft) was the association football team representing the Saar Protectorate in international football from 1950 to 1956 during the French occupation following World War II. As France opposed the inclusion of the Saarland in the Federal Republic of Germany until 1956, they administered it separately from Germany as the Saar Protectorate.

As the local population did not want to join France, separate organisations were founded. A National Olympic Committee was founded in 1950, leading to an appearance of Saar at the 1952 Summer Olympics. Also, considering themselves not an independent nation different from Germany, the football team was not designated as a "national team", and was more generally referred to as a "selection" (German: Auswahl) or some similar term.

== History ==
Due to post-war partition, Saarland was separate from both the Federal Republic of Germany (West Germany) and the German Democratic Republic (East Germany). The Saarländischer Fußballbund (SFB) was founded on 25 July 1948 in Sulzbach, with Willy Koch as first chairman. The clubs of the Saarland played in the local Ehrenliga for three seasons from 1948 to 1951, with the exception of the strong 1. FC Saarbrücken club, which played as guests in French Ligue 2 in 1948–49, where they were known as FC Sarrebruck. They easily finished top of the division that season. However, after French clubs voted unanimously against them joining the French Football Federation (resulting in the resignation of president Jules Rimet, who had suggested that Saarbrücken join), the club left the French league.

Not interested in rejoining the weak Ehrenliga, Saarbrücken established a short-lived invitational tournament in 1949, the Internationaler Saarlandpokal, which attracted a number of top teams, and is regarded as a forerunner to the European Cup. In 1955, Saarbrücken became the sole club representing Saarland in the newborn European Champion Clubs' Cup, winning the first leg in San Siro against the Italian champions AC Milan (3–4), but they were heavily defeated (1–4) and eliminated in the second leg at home by the Lombard opponents. By that time, however, 1.FCS and other leading Saarland clubs had already rejoined the DFB league system, playing in the Oberliga Südwest on a mutual agreement.

On 17 July 1949, the members of the SFB declined a proposal to apply for membership in the French Football Federation by a vote of 609–299 (55 abstentions). Led by new president Hermann Neuberger since 14 May 1950, the SFB became part of FIFA on 12 June 1950, three months before the German Football Association DFB was reinstated, and two years before the East German association was accepted.

The Saarland team was made up largely of footballers from 1. FC Saarbrücken and was buttressed by players from SV Saar 05 Saarbrücken and Borussia Neunkirchen, with occasional representation from clubs including SV St. Ingbert 1945, FC 1912 Ensdorf, and ASC Dudweiler.

The team played only 19 games, 10 of these against "B" squads, but did participate in the 1954 World Cup qualifiers, finishing ahead of Norway in their group by defeating them in Oslo; it was Saarland's only win ever against a full senior team. Prior to the 1954 World Cup in Switzerland, on 5 June, they hosted a game against defending World Champion Uruguay, losing 1–7. Other "A" team opponents in friendlies were Yugoslavia (1–5), the Netherlands (1–2, 2–3) and Switzerland (1–1). The only match played outside of Europe was against Uruguay in Montevideo.

Following a referendum in 1955 and the Saar Treaty, Saarland became part of the Federal Republic of Germany with effect on 1 January 1957. The SFB ended its separate FIFA membership and became part of the DFB as the SFV (de: Saarländischer Fußballverband). Coach Helmut Schön, who had managed the Saarland team since 1952, went on to coach the successful Germany national team in the 1960s and 1970s. Hermann Neuberger, a native of the Saarland, proposed the foundation of the Bundesliga in 1962, organized the 1974 FIFA World Cup, and served as president of the DFB from 1975 until his death in 1992.

== FIFA World Cup record ==
- 1950 – Did not enter, accepted as FIFA members only two weeks before the tournament
- 1954 – Did not qualify

FIFA World Cup record									Qualification record					
Year	Round	Position	Pld	W	D*	L	GF	GA	Pld	W	D	L	GF	GA
as Saar									as Saar					
(Uruguay) 1930	Not a member of FIFA								Not a member of FIFA					
(Italy) 1934	Not a member of FIFA								Not a member of FIFA					
(France) 1938	Did not exist								Did not exist					
as Saar									as Saar					
(Brazil) 1950	Not a member of FIFA								Not a member of FIFA					
(Switzerland) 1954	Did not qualify								4	1	1	2	4	8
Total	–	0/1	0	0	0	0	0	0	4	1	1	2	4	8

=== 1954 World Cup qualifying ===
The only time that the Saarland entered the World Cup or European Championship qualifiers was for the 1954 World Cup. They were drawn in Group 1 alongside West Germany and Norway, in a triangular series. In the opening round in summer 1953, they won their only competitive away match, beating Norway 3–2 in Oslo after trailing 0–2, and with only 10 effective players, after an early substitute due to injury, and Theodor Puff staying on the field with a broken fibula. Thus they still topped the group after West Germany drew their game in Oslo. Saarland were emphatically beaten 3–0 by West Germany in Stuttgart and could only manage a 0–0 draw at home against Norway. Both German teams were placed joint first until West Germany beat Norway 5–1, putting an end to Norwegian hopes. The remaining inter-German match, to be played after a four-month winter hiatus, would decide which one of the German teams should advance to the tournament in Switzerland.

Saarland, which had already secured second in the group ahead of Norway, needed a win at home to finish first, yet lost 3–1. Unbeaten West Germany topped the final ranking, went to Switzerland and won the 1954 World Cup there. Sepp Herberger would have capped Kurt Clemens for West Germany, but he was ineligible like all others who had played international games for Saarland.

This was the Saarland's only separate entry in the World Cup; its players, coaches and staff would join West Germany to assist in the defence of the World Cup in 1958.

FIFA World Cup qualification
Date	Venue	Opponents	Score	Saarland scorers	Year
24 June 1953	Bislett Stadion, Oslo	Norway	3–2	Binkert, Otto, Siedl	1954 FIFA World Cup qualification
11 October 1953	Neckarstadion, Stuttgart	West Germany	0–3		1954 FIFA World Cup qualification
8 November 1953	Ludwigsparkstadion, Saarbrücken	Norway	0–0		1954 FIFA World Cup qualification
28 March 1954	Ludwigsparkstadion, Saarbrücken	West Germany	1–3	Martin (pen.)	1954 FIFA World Cup qualification

Pos.	Team	Pld	W	D	L	GF	GA	GD	Pts
1	West Germany	4	3	1	0	12	3	+9	7
2	Saar	4	1	1	2	4	8	−4	3
3	Norway	4	0	2	2	4	9	−5	2

== Player records ==
In total, 42 players appeared for the Saarland national team. Waldemar Philippi holds the record for the most caps, appearing in 18 out of the team's 19 matches and only missing a friendly against Uruguay in 1954.

=== Most caps ===
Rank	Player	Caps	Goals
1	Waldemar Philippi	18	0
2	Herbert Martin	17	6
3	Gerhard Siedl	16	4
4	Erwin Strempel	14	0
5	Herbert Binkert	12	6
5	Theodor Puff	12	0
7	Nikolaus Biewer	11	0
8	Kurt Clemens	10	0
8	Albert Keck	10	0
8	Peter Momber	10	1

=== All goalscorers ===
Rank	Player	Goals	Caps	Average
1	Herbert Binkert	6	12	0.50
1	Herbert Martin	6	17	0.35
3	Erich Leibenguth	5	5	1.00
4	Gerhard Siedl	4	16	0.25
4	Heinz Vollmar	4	4	1.00
6	Fritz Altmeyer	3	6	0.50
7	Karl Berg	1	9	0.11
7	Werner Emser	1	3	0.33
7	Ewald Follmann	1	3	0.33
7	Peter Krieger	1	4	0.25
7	Peter Momber	1	10	0.10
7	Robert Niederkirchner	1	1	1.00
7	Werner Otto	1	6	0.17
7	Karl Ringel	1	2	0.50

=== Clean sheets ===
Two goalkeepers managed to keep a clean sheet in Saarland's nineteen matches.

Player	Caps	Clean sheet			Average
Player	Caps	Date	Opponent	Score	Average
Erwin Strempel	14	8 November 1953	Norway	0–0	0.07
Hans Neuerburg	1	3 June 1956	Portugal B	0–0	1.00

=== 1950 ===
Pos.	Player	Apps	Goals
GK	Erwin Strempel	1	0
DF	Karl Berg	1	1
DF	Nikolaus Biewer	1	0
DF	Peter Momber	1	0
DF	Waldemar Philippi	1	0
DF	Heinrich Schmidt	1	0
MF	Kurt Clemens	1	0
FW	Erich Leibenguth	1	2
FW	Herbert Martin	1	2
FW	Ewald Follmann	1	0
FW	Karl Schirra	1	0

=== 1951 ===
Pos.	Player	Apps	Goals
GK	Erwin Strempel	3	0
DF	Nikolaus Biewer	3	0
DF	Waldemar Philippi	3	0
DF	Theodor Puff	3	0
DF	Karl Berg	2	0
DF	Franz Immig	2	0
DF	Peter Momber	1	0
DF	Erwin Wilhelm	1	0
MF	Jakob Balzert	3	0
FW	Erich Leibenguth	3	3
FW	Herbert Binkert	3	2
FW	Herbert Martin	3	2
FW	Gerhard Siedl	2	2
FW	Hans Bild	1+1	0

=== 1952 ===
Pos.	Player	Apps	Goals
GK	Erwin Strempel	2	0
DF	Nikolaus Biewer	2	0
DF	Waldemar Philippi	2	0
DF	Theodor Puff	2	0
DF	Karl Berg	1	0
DF	Franz Immig	1	0
DF	Heinz Schussig	1	0
MF	Kurt Clemens	2	0
MF	Jakob Balzert	1	0
MF	Werner Otto	1	0
FW	Herbert Binkert	2	2
FW	Herbert Martin	2	1
FW	Gerhard Siedl	2	0
FW	Erich Leibenguth	1	0

=== 1953 ===
Pos.	Player	Apps	Goals
GK	Erwin Strempel	3	0
DF	Karl Berg	2	0
DF	Nikolaus Biewer	2	0
DF	Albert Keck	1	0
DF	Peter Momber	3	0
DF	Waldemar Philippi	3	0
DF	Theodor Puff	3	0
MF	Jakob Balzert	2	0
MF	Kurt Clemens	3	0
MF	Werner Otto	3	1
FW	Herbert Binkert	1	1
FW	Helmut Fottner	1	0
FW	Herbert Martin	3	0
FW	Karl Schirra	1	0
FW	Gerhard Siedl	3	1

=== 1954 ===
Pos.	Player	Total		FIFA World Cup qualification		Friendlies	
Pos.	Player	Apps	Goals	Apps	Goals	Apps	Goals
GK	Horst Borcherding	1	0	0	0	1	0
GK	Ladislav Jirasek	1	0	0	0	1	0
GK	Horst Klauck	1	0	0	0	1	0
GK	Erwin Strempel	2	0	1	0	1	0
DF	Karl Berg	2	0	0	0	2	0
DF	Nikolaus Biewer	3	0	1	0	2	0
DF	Albert Keck	4	0	1	0	3	0
DF	Peter Momber	2	0	1	0	1	0
DF	Waldemar Philippi	3	0	1	0	2	0
DF	Theodor Puff	1	0	0	0	1	0
DF	Willi Sippel	3	0	0	0	3	0
MF	Kurt Clemens	1	0	1	0	0	0
MF	Werner Otto	2	0	1	0	1	0
FW	Fritz Altmeyer	2	1	0	0	2	0
FW	Herbert Binkert	2	0	1	0	1	0
FW	Werner Emser	3	1	0	0	3	1
FW	Helmut Fottner	1	0	0	0	1	0
FW	Herbert Martin	4	1	1	1	3	0
FW	Hermann Monter	1	0	0	0	1	0
FW	Robert Niederkirchner	1	1	0	0	1	1
FW	Karl Schirra	4	0	1	0	3	0
FW	Gerhard Siedl	4	0	1	0	3	0

=== 1955 ===
Pos.	Player	Apps	Goals
GK	Erwin Strempel	3	0
DF	Karl Berg	1	0
DF	Albert Keck	3	0
DF	Gerd Lauck	2+1	0
DF	Peter Momber	2	1
DF	Waldemar Philippi	3	0
DF	Walter Riedschy	0+1	0
DF	Heinz Schussig	2	0
DF	Willi Sippel	1	0
MF	Kurt Clemens	1	0
FW	Fritz Altmeyer	3	2
FW	Herbert Binkert	2	1
FW	Ewald Follmann	2	1
FW	Peter Krieger	2	1
FW	Herbert Martin	2	0
FW	Hermann Monter	0+1	0
FW	Gerhard Siedl	2	0
FW	Heinz Vollmar	2	3

=== 1956 ===
Pos.	Player	Apps	Goals
GK	Horst Borcherding	2	0
GK	Hans Neuerburg	1	0
DF	Albert Keck	2	0
DF	Gerd Lauck	3	0
DF	Peter Momber	0+1	0
DF	Waldemar Philippi	3	0
DF	Werner Prauss	1	0
DF	Theodor Puff	3	0
MF	Kurt Clemens	2	0
FW	Fritz Altmeyer	0+1	0
FW	Herbert Binkert	2	0
FW	Manfred Ebert	2	0
FW	Günter Herrmann	1	0
FW	Dieter Honecker	1	0
FW	Peter Krieger	2	0
FW	Karl-Heinz Kunkel	0+1	0
FW	Herbert Martin	2	0
FW	Karl Ringel	1+1	1
FW	Gerhard Siedl	2+1	1
FW	Heinz Vollmar	2	1
FW	Ernst Zägel	1	0

== Managers ==
Manager	Period			Record								Ref.
Manager	First match	Last match	Days	Pld	W	D	L	GF	GA	GD	Win %	Ref.
(France) Auguste Jordan	22 November 1950	14 October 1951	326	4	3	0	1	14	11	+3	75.00	
(West Germany) Helmut Schön	20 April 1952	6 June 1956	1,508	15	3	3	9	22	43	−21	20.00	
Total				19	6	3	10	36	54	−18	31.58	—

== Results ==
19 matches played: 6 wins, 3 draws, 10 losses

22 November 1950 Friendly	Saar	5–3	Switzerland B	Saarbrücken, Saarland
	Berg 3'; Leibenguth 11', 75'; Martin 14', 65'	Report		Stadium: Stadion Kieselhumes; Attendance: 16,000; Referee: Léon Boës (France)

27 May 1951 Friendly	Saar	3–2	Austria B	Saarbrücken, Saarland
	Binkert 15'; Leibenguth 20', 43'	Report		Stadium: Ludwigsparkstadion; Attendance: 15,000; Referee: Laurent Franken (Belgium)
Note: Erich Leibenguth set the goal scoring record for Saarland (4 goals)

15 September 1951 Friendly	Switzerland B	2–5	Saar	Bern, Switzerland
		Report	Binkert 31'; Leibenguth 61' (pen.); Martin 62', 85'; Siedl 89'	Stadium: Stadion Neufeld; Attendance: 6,500; Referee: Giuseppe Carpani (Italy)
Note: Erich Leibenguth set the goal scoring record for Saarland (5 goals)

14 October 1951 Friendly	Austria B	4–1	Saar	Vienna, Austria
15:00 (UTC+1:00)		Report	Siedl 56'	Stadium: Praterstadion; Attendance: 21,000; Referee: Miljenko Podubsky (Yugoslavia)

20 April 1952 Friendly	Saar	0–1	France B	Saarbrücken, Saarland
			Haan ?'	Stadium: Ludwigsparkstadion; Attendance: 20,000; Referee: René Baumberger (Switzerland)

5 October 1952 Friendly	France B	1–3	Saar	Strasbourg, France
	Sinibaldi 35'	Report	Binkert 9', 78'; Martin 40'	Stadium: Stade de la Meinau; Attendance: 21,032; Referee: Ernst Dörflinger (Switzerland)

24 June 1953 1954 FIFA World Cup qualifier	Norway	2–3	Saar	Oslo, Norway
19:00 (UTC+1:00)	Thoresen 3'; Dahlen 15'	Report	Binkert 16'; Otto 30'; Siedl 55'	Stadium: Bislett Stadion; Attendance: 21,000; Referee: Jan Bronkhorst (Netherlands)

11 October 1953 1954 FIFA World Cup qualifier	West Germany	3–0	Saar	Stuttgart, West Germany
15:00 (+1:00)	Morlock 13', 50'; Schade 70'	Report		Stadium: Neckarstadion; Attendance: 50,000; Referee: Karel van der Meer (Netherlands)

8 November 1953 1954 FIFA World Cup qualifier	Saar	0–0	Norway	Saarbrücken, Saarland
14:30 (+1:00)		Report		Stadium: Ludwigsparkstadion; Attendance: 42,000; Referee: Leo Horn (Netherlands)

28 March 1954 1954 FIFA World Cup qualifier	Saar	1–3	West Germany	Saarbrücken, Saarland
15:00 (+1:00)	Martin 68' (pen.)	Report	Morlock 36', 48'; Schäfer 84'	Stadium: Ludwigsparkstadion; Attendance: 53,000; Referee: Jan Bronkhorst (Netherlands)
Note: Herbert Martin set the goal scoring record for Saarland (6 goals)

5 June 1954 Friendly	Saar	1–7	Uruguay	Saarbrücken, Saarland
	Niederkirchner 23'	Report	Abbadie ?'; Ambrois ?', ?'; Schiaffino ?', ?'; Varela ?'; Míguez ?'	Stadium: Ludwigsparkstadion; Attendance: 15,000; Referee: Albert Dusch (West Germany)

26 September 1954 Friendly	Saar	1–5	Yugoslavia	Saarbrücken, Saarland
	Emser 17'	Report	Vukas 5', 71', 84'; Bobek 56'; Veselinović 59'	Stadium: Ludwigsparkstadion; Attendance: 16,000; Referee: Aloïs Smidts (Belgium)

17 October 1954 Friendly	France B	4–1	Saar	Lyon, France
	Bliard ?', ?', ?'; Ninel ?'		Altmeyer ?'	Stadium: Stade de Gerland; Attendance: 15,000; Referee: René Baumberger (Switzerland)

1 May 1955 Friendly	Portugal B	6–1	Saar	Oeiras, Portugal
16:30 (UTC+1:00)	Monteiro da Costa ?', ?'; José Pedro ?', ?'; André ?'; Fernandes ?'		Binkert 27'	Stadium: Estádio Nacional do Jamor; Attendance: 20,000; Referee: Rafael Tamarit Falaguera (Spain)
Note: Herbert Binkert become the shared top goal scorer for Saarland (6 goals)

9 October 1955 Friendly	Saar	7–5	France B	Saarbrücken, Saarland
	Vollmar ?', ?', ?'; Momber ?'; Altmeyer ?', ?'; Krieger ?'		Schussig ?' (o.g.); Foix ?'; Mekhloufi ?', ?'; Schultz ?'	Stadium: Ludwigsparkstadion; Attendance: 25,000; Referee: Leo Horn (Netherlands)

16 November 1955 Friendly	Saar	1–2	Netherlands	Saarbrücken, Saarland
14:30 (UTC+1:00)	Follmann 7'	Report	van der Hart 29'; Brusselers 55'	Stadium: Ludwigsparkstadion; Attendance: 12,000; Referee: Lucien Van Nuffel (Belgium)

1 May 1956 Friendly	Saar	1–1	Switzerland	Saarbrücken, Saarland
	Siedl 57'	Report	Riva 33'	Stadium: Ludwigsparkstadion; Attendance: 20,000; Referee: Leo Horn (Netherlands)

3 June 1956 Friendly	Saar	0–0	Portugal B	Saarbrücken, Saarland
		Report		Stadium: Ludwigsparkstadion; Attendance: 12,000; Referee: Gérard Versyp (Belgium)

6 June 1956 Friendly	Netherlands	3–2	Saar	Amsterdam, Netherlands
19:00 (UTC+1:00)	Koopal 6'; Lenstra 22'; Wilkes 63'	Report	Vollmar 40'; Ringel 86'	Stadium: Olympisch Stadion; Attendance: 60,000; Referee: István Zsolt (Hungary)

== Record by opponent ==
Team	Pld	W	D	L	GF	GA	GD	WPCT
Austria B	2	1	0	1	4	6	−2	50.00
France B	4	2	0	2	11	11	0	50.00
Netherlands	2	0	0	2	3	5	−2	0.00
Norway	2	1	1	0	3	2	+1	50.00
Portugal B	2	0	1	1	1	6	−5	0.00
Switzerland	1	0	1	0	1	1	0	0.00
Switzerland B	2	2	0	0	10	5	+5	100.00
Uruguay	1	0	0	1	1	7	−6	0.00
West Germany	2	0	0	2	1	6	−5	0.00
Yugoslavia	1	0	0	1	1	5	−4	0.00
Total	19	6	3	10	36	54	−18	31.58

Source: Results

== Anthem ==
Saarland, having just been separated from Germany, did not have a national anthem of its own, and so the first international football fixture (1950 vs. Switzerland) was the reason to establish the Saarlandlied as the anthem for such events.

== See also ==
- Saarland national football B team
