= Peter Momber =

German footballer

Personal information
- Date of birth: 4 January 1921
- Date of death: 23 January 1975 (aged 54)
- Position: Defender

Senior career*
Years	Team	Apps	(Gls)
1947–1948	Borussia Neunkirchen		
1948–1956	1. FC Saarbrücken		
1956–1958	SV St. Ingbert 1945		

International career
1950–1956	Saarland	10	(1)
- * Club domestic league appearances and goals

Peter Momber (4 January 1921 – 23 January 1975) was a German footballer who played for Borussia Neunkirchen, 1. FC Saarbrücken, SV St. Ingbert 1945 and the Saarland national team as a defender.
