= Gerd Lauck =

German footballer

Personal information
- Date of birth: 5 July 1931
- Date of death: 10 October 2005 (aged 74)
- Position: Defender

Senior career*
Years	Team	Apps	(Gls)
1952–1962	Borussia Neunkirchen	239	(15)

International career
1955	Saarland B	1	(0)
1955–1956	Saarland	5	(0)
- * Club domestic league appearances and goals

Gerd Lauck (5 July 1931 – 10 October 2005) was a German footballer who played for Borussia Neunkirchen and the Saarland national team as a defender.
