= Jakob Balzert =

German footballer

Personal information
- Date of birth: 6 January 1918
- Date of death: 23 June 1997 (aged 79)
- Position: Forward

Senior career*
Years	Team	Apps	(Gls)
1942–1955	1. FC Saarbrücken		

International career
1951–1953	Saarland	6	(0)
- * Club domestic league appearances and goals

Jakob Balzert (6 January 1918 – 23 June 1997) was a German footballer who played for 1. FC Saarbrücken and the Saarland national team as a forward.
