= Herbert Martin =

German footballer

Personal information
- Date of birth: 29 August 1925
- Place of birth: Ensdorf, Saar Basin
- Date of death: 29 September 2016 (aged 91)
- Place of death: Ensdorf, Germany
- Position: Forward

Senior career*
Years	Team	Apps	(Gls)
1949–1950	FC Ensdorf		
1950–1961	1. FC Saarbrücken	254	(197)

International career
1950–1956	Saarland	17	(6)
- * Club domestic league appearances and goals

Herbert Martin (29 August 1925 – 29 September 2016) was a Saarland and German footballer.

The striker spent the majority of his career with 1. FC Saarbrücken. He was the leading goal scorer for the Saarland national football team (tied with Herbert Binkert), with six goals, while the team existed between 1950 and 1956. He won 17 caps for the Saar federation which was later included into the West German Football Association. He died in 2016.
