= Albert Keck =

German footballer

Personal information
- Date of birth: 4 August 1930
- Place of birth: Saarbrücken, Saar Basin
- Position: Defender

Senior career*
Years	Team	Apps	(Gls)
1951–1961	1. FC Saarbrücken	230	(6)

International career
1953–1956	Saarland	10	(0)
- * Club domestic league appearances and goals

Albert Keck (4 August 1930 – June 1990) is a German former footballer who played internationally for Saarland.
