= Horst Klauck =

German footballer

Personal information
- Date of birth: 30 September 1931
- Date of death: 2004 (aged 72–73)
- Position: Goalkeeper

Senior career*
Years	Team	Apps	(Gls)
1952–1959	1. FC Saarbrücken		

International career
1954	Saarland	1	(0)
- * Club domestic league appearances and goals

Horst Klauck (30 September 1931 – 2004) was a German footballer who played for 1. FC Saarbrücken and the Saarland national team as a goalkeeper.
