= Erich Leibenguth =

German footballer

Personal information
- Date of birth: 31 March 1917
- Place of birth: Wellesweiler, German Empire
- Date of death: 2 June 2005 (aged 88)
- Position: Forward

Senior career*
Years	Team	Apps	(Gls)
1938–1939	Hindenburg Allenstein	6	(3)
1945–1952	Borussia Neunkirchen		

International career
1950–1952	Saarland	5	(5)

Managerial career
- TSC Zweibrücken
- SV Wellesweiler
- * Club domestic league appearances and goals

Erich Leibenguth (31 March 1917 – 2 June 2005) was a German former footballer who played internationally for Saarland as a striker. Having played only five matches, he was Saarland's third topscorer with five goals.

== Honours ==
Allenstein

- Gauliga Ostpreußen (1): 1939

Neunkirchen

- Ehrenliga Saarland (1): 1949
