= Fritz Altmeyer =

German footballer

Personal information
- Full name: Friedrich Altmeyer
- Date of birth: 26 November 1928
- Date of death: 13 November 2013 (aged 84)
- Position: Forward

Senior career*
| Years | Team | Apps | (Gls) |
| 1952–1966 | SV Saar 05 Saarbrücken | | |

International career
| 1954–1956 | Saarland | 6 | (3) |
- * Club domestic league appearances and goals

Friedrich Altmeyer (26 November 1928 – 13 November 2013) was a German footballer who played for SV Saar 05 Saarbrücken and the Saarland national team as a forward.
