= Hans Neuerburg =

German footballer

Personal information
- Date of birth: 2 November 1932
- Date of death: 2004 (aged 71–72)
- Position: Goalkeeper

Senior career*
Years	Team	Apps	(Gls)
1954–1957	Sportfreunde 05 Saarbrücken		

International career
1956	Saarland	1	(0)
- * Club domestic league appearances and goals

Hans Neuerburg (2 November 1932 – 2004) was a German footballer who played for Sportfreunde 05 Saarbrücken and the Saarland national team as a goalkeeper.
