= Heinz Vollmar =

German footballer

Personal information
- Date of birth: 26 April 1936
- Place of birth: Germany
- Date of death: 12 October 1987 (aged 51)
- Place of death: St. Ingbert, West Germany
- Position: Striker

Senior career*
Years	Team	Apps	(Gls)
1954–1960	SV St. Ingbert 1945^{OL Südwest}		
1960–1963	1. FC Saarbrücken^{OL Südwest}		
1963–1965	1. FC Saarbrücken^{Bundesliga}	23	(3)

International career
1955–1956	Saarland	4	(4)
1956–1961	West Germany	12	(3)
- * Club domestic league appearances and goals

Heinz Vollmar (26 April 1936 – 12 October 1987) was a Saarland and German football player.

Vollmar belongs to those Germany international players (war-year examples include Ernest Wilimowski, Franz Binder, Max Merkel; latest examples include Ulf Kirsten, Andreas Thom, Matthias Sammer etc.) that have represented other nations in their international career as well. He was a tricky winger who mostly played in the outside left position.

Vollmar was a citizen of Saarland, what came under French protectorate after World War II, and wore the Saarland colours four times, scoring four in these matches. His final Saarland appearance happened under then Saarland coach Helmut Schön less than a month before his first West Germany match under coach Sepp Herberger: On 6 June 1956, Saarland lost 2–3 to the Netherlands in Amsterdam with Vollmar scoring one goal that evening.

With the population of Saarland to join West Germany, via a referendum taken place already in 1955, Vollmar's first of twelve West Germany caps was on 30 June 1956, in Stockholm versus Sweden. He scored his first of three goals against Belgium six months later. Despite the fact a year had passed since his final West Germany match, Heinz Vollmar was part of the West German squad at the 1962 FIFA World Cup.
