= Nikolaus Biewer =

German footballer

Personal information
- Date of birth: 24 January 1922
- Date of death: 16 November 1980 (aged 58)
- Position: Defender

Senior career*
Years	Team	Apps	(Gls)
- SC 07 Altenkessel
1943–1955	1. FC Saarbrücken	129	(3)

International career
1950–1954	Saarland	11	(0)
- * Club domestic league appearances and goals

Nikolaus Biewer (24 January 1922 – 16 November 1980) was a German footballer who played internationally for Saarland.
