= Kurt Clemens =

German footballer (1925–2021)

Personal information
- Date of birth: 7 November 1925
- Date of death: 19 July 2021 (aged 95)
- Position: Midfielder

Senior career*
Years	Team	Apps	(Gls)
–1948	FC Homburg		
1948–1949	VfB Mühlburg		
1949–1951	1. FC Saarbrücken		
1951–1953	FC Nancy	48	(7)
1953–1963	SV Saar 05 Saarbrücken		

International career
1950–1956	Saarland	10	(0)
- * Club domestic league appearances and goals

Kurt Clemens (7 November 1925 – 19 July 2021) was a German footballer who played for the Saarland national team. He turned 95 in November 2020 and died in July 2021.
