= Portugal national football B team =

Football team

The Portugal national football B team is the secondary football team of Portugal. It is used primarily for youth footballers or uncapped footballers with a strong prospect for the main team.

== Competition records ==
=== Torneio Vale do Tejo ===
- 2001 second place
- 2002 champions
- 2003 champions
- 2004 champions
- 2005 third place
- 2006 third place
- 2008 champions
