= Max Morlock =

German footballer (1925–1994)

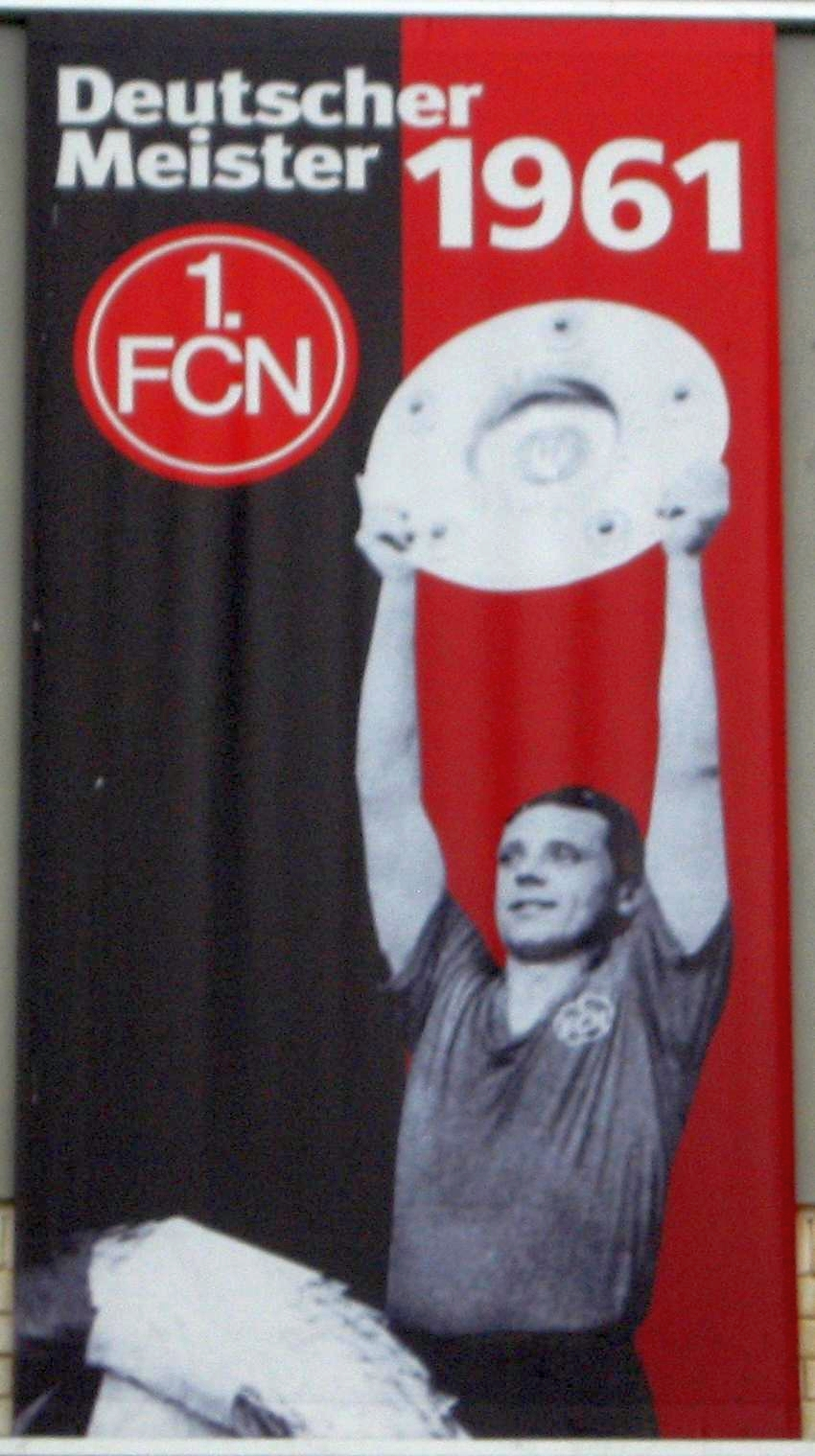
- Morlock in an 1. FC Nürnberg commemorative banner

Personal information
- Full name: Maximilian Morlock
- Date of birth: 11 May 1925
- Place of birth: Nuremberg, Germany
- Date of death: 10 September 1994 (aged 69)
- Place of death: Nuremberg, Germany
- Position: Forward

Youth career
- –1940: Eintracht Nürnberg

Senior career*
Years	Team	Apps	(Gls)
1940–1964	1. FC Nürnberg	472	(294)

International career
1950–1958	West Germany	26	(21)
Medal record
Men's football
Representing West Germany
FIFA World Cup
Winner	1954 Switzerland
- * Club domestic league appearances and goals

Maximilian Morlock (German pronunciation: [ˈmɔʁlɔk]; 11 May 1925 – 10 September 1994) was a German footballer active in the 1950s and early 1960s. In his time with the West Germany national team, he earned 26 caps and scored 21 goals. His position was that of an inside right forward.

As a player, Morlock's strengths were a sound technique coupled with fighting spirit. As a linkman he felt at home best between defense and attack, but he was also dangerous in front of the goal.

== Club career ==
In his youth he learned to play football at Eintracht Nürnberg. In 1940 he became a member of the then famous 1. FC Nürnberg, debuting in the first team on 30 November 1941. Until 1964 he appeared more than 900 times in the first team of the so-called Club and scored about 700 goals. In 1948 and 1961 he led the team to German championships, in 1962 to the German Cup. 38 years old he even appeared 21 times in the founding season of the German Bundesliga. He also was top scorer of the Oberliga Süd in 1950–51 and 1951–52.

== International career ==
His first cap for the national team was in 1950, when he played instead of the injured Fritz Walter. He was a member of the West Germany team that won their first World Cup in 1954. In the final match against Hungary Morlock scored West Germany's first goal to start the comeback after going 2–0 down. He received his last cap in a friendly game against Egypt in December 1958.

== Death ==
Morlock died from cancer on 10 September 1994, aged 69.

== Career statistics ==
=== International ===
Appearances and goals by national team and year
National team	Year	Apps	Goals
West Germany	1950	1	0
West Germany	1951	3	4
West Germany	1952	3	2
West Germany	1953	4	4
West Germany	1954	8	9
West Germany	1955	3	1
West Germany	1956	2	0
West Germany	1957	0	0
West Germany	1958	2	1
Total		26	21

Scores and results list West Germany's goal tally first, score column indicates score after each Morlock goal.

List of international goals scored by Max Morlock
No.	Date	Venue	Opponent	Score	Result	Competition	Ref.
1	23 September 1951	Praterstadion, Vienna, Austria	Austria	–	2–0	Friendly	
2	17 October 1951	Dalymount Park, Dublin, Republic of Ireland	Republic of Ireland	1–2	2–3	Friendly	
3	21 November 1951	Istanbul, Turkey	Turkey	1–0	2–0	Friendly	
4	21 November 1951	Istanbul, Turkey	Turkey	2–0	2–0	Friendly	
5	9 November 1952	Rosenaustadion, Augsburg, West Germany	Switzerland	–	5–1	Friendly	
6	21 December 1952	Südweststadion, Ludwigshafen, West Germany	Yugoslavia	–	3–2	Friendly	
7	11 October 1953	Neckarstadion, Stuttgart, West Germany	Saar	1–0	3–0	1954 FIFA World Cup qualification	
8	11 October 1953	Neckarstadion, Stuttgart, West Germany	Saar	2–0	3–0	1954 FIFA World Cup qualification	
9	22 November 1953	Volksparkstadion, Hamburg, West Germany	Norway	1–1	5–1	1954 FIFA World Cup qualification	
10	22 November 1953	Volksparkstadion, Hamburg, West Germany	Norway	2–1	5–1	1954 FIFA World Cup qualification	
11	28 March 1954	Ludwigsparkstadion, Saarbrücken, Saar Protectorate	Saar	1–0	3–1	1954 FIFA World Cup qualification	
12	28 March 1954	Ludwigsparkstadion, Saarbrücken, Saar Protectorate	Saar	2–0	3–1	1954 FIFA World Cup qualification	
13	25 April 1954	St. Jakob Stadium, Basel, Switzerland	Switzerland	–	5–3	Friendly	
14	17 June 1954	Wankdorf Stadium, Bern, Switzerland	Turkey	4–1	4–1	1954 FIFA World Cup	
15	23 June 1954	Letzigrund, Zurich, Switzerland	Turkey	3–1	7–2	1954 FIFA World Cup	
16	23 June 1954	Letzigrund, Zurich, Switzerland	Turkey	4–1	7–2	1954 FIFA World Cup	
17	23 June 1954	Letzigrund, Zurich, Switzerland	Turkey	5–1	7–2	1954 FIFA World Cup	
18	30 June 1954	St. Jakob Stadium, Basel, Switzerland	Austria	2–0	6–1	1954 FIFA World Cup	
19	4 July 1954	Wankdorf Stadium, Bern, Switzerland	Hungary	–	3–2	1954 FIFA World Cup	
20	25 September 1955	JNA Stadium, Belgrade, Yugoslavia	Yugoslavia	1–3	1–3	Friendly	
21	28 December 1958	Cairo, Egypt	Egypt	–	1–2	Friendly	

== Honours ==
- In 1961 he was voted German Footballer of the Year by the Association of German Sports Journalists.
- In 1995, less than a year after his death, the square in front of the Frankenstadion, home of the 1. FC Nürnberg, was renamed Max-Morlock-Platz in his honour. The stadium's postal address is Max-Morlock-Platz 1.
- In 2006, a majority of fans voted in favour of renaming the Frankenstadion itself into "Max-Morlock-Stadion", but the city of Nuremberg won a sponsorship deal with a local bank, which included renaming the stadium EasyCredit-Stadion after one of that bank's financial products. His name was finally used as the stadium's name in July 2017.

== See also ==
- List of FIFA World Cup top goalscorers
