= Erwin Strempel =

German footballer (1924–1999)

Personal information
- Date of birth: 6 January 1924
- Date of death: 17 October 1999 (aged 75)
- Position: Goalkeeper

Senior career*
Years	Team	Apps	(Gls)
- SC 1910 Blieskastel-Lautzkirchen
1946–1955	1. FC Saarbrücken	127	(0)
1955–1959	Borussia Neunkirchen		

International career
1950–1955	Saarland	14	(0)
- * Club domestic league appearances and goals

Erwin Strempel (6 January 1924 – 17 October 1999) was a German footballer who played internationally for the Saarland national football team.
