= Theodor Puff =

German footballer

Personal information
- Date of birth: 21 November 1927
- Date of death: 9 May 1999 (aged 71)
- Position: Defender

Senior career*
Years	Team	Apps	(Gls)
1946–1960	1. FC Saarbrücken	239	(10)

International career
1951–1956	Saarland	12	(0)
1955	Saarland B	1	(0)
- * Club domestic league appearances and goals

Theodor Puff (21 November 1927 – 9 May 1999) was a German footballer who played internationally for Saarland as a defender.
