= Waldemar Philippi =

German footballer

Personal information
- Date of birth: 13 April 1929
- Date of death: 4 October 1990 (aged 61)
- Position: Defender

Senior career*
Years	Team	Apps	(Gls)
1945–1960	1. FC Saarbrücken	255	(16)

International career
1950–1956	Saarland	18	(0)
- * Club domestic league appearances and goals

Waldemar Philippi (13 April 1929 – 4 October 1990) was a German footballer who played internationally for Saarland.
