= Karl Berg (footballer) =

German footballer

Personal information
- Date of birth: 12 January 1921
- Date of death: 25 September 2007 (aged 86)
- Position: Midfielder

Senior career*
Years	Team	Apps	(Gls)
1941–1956	1. FC Saarbrücken	138	(24)

International career
1950–1955	Saarland	9	(1)
- * Club domestic league appearances and goals

Karl Berg (12 January 1921 – 25 September 2007) was a German footballer who played internationally for Saarland.
