= Gerhard Siedl =

German footballer

Personal information
- Full name: Gerhard Leopold Karl Siedl
- Date of birth: 22 March 1929
- Place of birth: Munich, Germany
- Date of death: 9 May 1998 (aged 69)
- Place of death: Munich, Germany
- Position: Striker

Senior career*
Years	Team	Apps	(Gls)
1945–1948	FC Bayern Munich		
1948–1949	Borussia Neunkirchen		
1953–1956	1. FC Saarbrücken	94	(42)
1956–1957	Karlsruher SC		
1957–1960	FC Bayern Munich		
1960–1961	FC Basel	10	(1)
- AZ
- SV Austria Salzburg
- FC Dornbirn 1913

International career
1951–1956	Saarland	16	(4)
1957–1959	West Germany	6	(3)
- * Club domestic league appearances and goals

Gerhard Leopold Karl Siedl (22 March 1929 – 9 May 1998) was a German footballer who played international football for both the Saar and West German national teams. In 1953, he scored the winning goal in Oslo against Norway in the qualifiers for the 1954 FIFA World Cup. The match was Saar's only road victory in its brief history.

During his club career he played for FC Bayern Munich (1945–1948, 1951–1953, 1957–1960), Borussia Neunkirchen (1948–1949), 1. FC Saarbrücken, Karlsruher SC, FC Basel, AZ, SV Austria Salzburg, and FC Dornbirn 1913. With Bayern he won the 1957 DFB-Pokal.

== Sources and References ==
- Rotblau: Jahrbuch Saison 2014/2015. Publisher: FC Basel Marketing AG. ISBN 978-3-7245-2027-6
