= Peter Krieger (footballer) =

German footballer

Personal information
- Date of birth: 30 November 1929
- Place of birth: Geislingen an der Steige, Germany
- Date of death: 1981 (aged 51–52)
- Position: Forward

Senior career*
Years	Team	Apps	(Gls)
1955–1962	1. FC Saarbrücken	156	(40)

International career
1955–1956	Saarland	4	(1)
- * Club domestic league appearances and goals

Peter Krieger (30 November 1929 – 1981) was a German footballer who played for 1. FC Saarbrücken and the Saarland national team as a forward.
