= Werner Otto (footballer) =

German footballer (1929–2025)

Personal information
- Date of birth: 3 January 1929
- Date of death: 19 March 2025 (aged 96)
- Position: Midfielder

Senior career*
Years	Team	Apps	(Gls)
1951–1958	1. FC Saarbrücken	135	(41)

International career
1952–1954	Saarland	6	(1)
- * Club domestic league appearances and goals

Werner Otto (3 January 1929 – 19 March 2025) was a German footballer who played as a midfielder for 1. FC Saarbrücken. Internationally, he made six appearances for Saarland, scoring once. He died on 19 March 2025, at the age of 96.
