= Herbert Binkert =

German footballer (1923–2020)

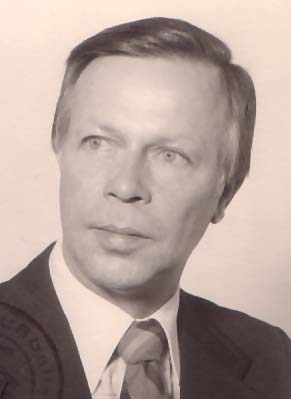

Personal information
- Date of birth: 3 September 1923
- Place of birth: Karlsruhe, Weimar Republic
- Date of death: 4 January 2020 (aged 96)
- Position: Striker

Youth career
- Karlsruher FC Phönix

Senior career*
Years	Team	Apps	(Gls)
1942–1945	FV Saarbrücken	11	(13)
1945–1946	Karlsruher FC Phönix		
1946–1948	VfB Stuttgart		
1948–1960	1. FC Saarbrücken	188	(123)

International career
1951–1956	Saarland	12	(6)

Managerial career
- 1961–1965: SV Röchling Völklingen
- 1965–1970: FC Homburg
- 1971–1973: VfB Theley
- 1973–1974: 1. FC Saarbrücken
- * Club domestic league appearances and goals

Herbert Binkert (3 September 1923 – 4 January 2020) was a German footballer who played internationally for Saarland.

== Club career ==
With 1. FC Saarbrücken the striker took part in the 1955–56 European Cup.

== International career ==
Binkert scored six goals in twelve international matches for the Saarland.
