= Werner Emser =

German footballer

Personal information
- Date of birth: 11 October 1920
- Date of death: Unknown (before 2004)
- Position: Forward

Senior career*
Years	Team	Apps	(Gls)
1952–1958	Borussia Neunkirchen		
1958–1959	FV Speyer		
1959–1961	Borussia Neunkirchen		

International career
1954	Saarland	3	(1)
1955	Saarland B	1	(0)
- * Club domestic league appearances and goals

Werner Emser (11 October 1920 – before 2004) was a German footballer who played for Borussia Neunkirchen, FV Speyer and the Saarland national team as a forward.
