= Ewald Follmann =

German footballer (1926–1990)

Personal information
- Date of birth: 28 January 1926
- Date of death: 20 June 1990 (aged 64)
- Position: Forward

Senior career*
Years	Team	Apps	(Gls)
1946–1949	Borussia Neunkirchen		
1949–1950	FC Metz	14	(1)
1950–1961	Borussia Neunkirchen	179	(39)
Total		193+	(40+)

International career
1950–1955	Saarland	3	(1)
- * Club domestic league appearances and goals

Ewald Follmann (28 January 1926 – 20 June 1990) was a German footballer who played for FC Metz, Borussia Neunkirchen and the Saarland national team as a forward.
