= Karl Ringel =

German footballer (1932–2024)

Personal information
- Date of birth: 30 September 1932
- Place of birth: Fürth, Bavaria, Germany
- Date of death: 4 May 2024 (aged 91)
- Place of death: Neunkirchen, Saarland, Germany
- Positions: Forward; midfielder

Senior career*
| Years | Team | Apps | (Gls) |
| 1951–1952 | SpVgg Fürth | | |
| 1952–1953 | VfB Friedrichshafen | | |
| 1953–1965 | Borussia Neunkirchen | | |
| 1965–1966 | 1. FC Saarbrücken | 9 | (0) |

International career
| 1955 | Saarland B | 1 | (0) |
| 1956 | Saarland | 2 | (1) |
| 1958 | West Germany | 1 | (0) |
- * Club domestic league appearances and goals

Karl Ringel (30 September 1932 – 4 May 2024) was a German footballer who played as a forward or midfielder, representing both Saarland and West Germany internationally. Ringel died on 4 May 2024, at the age of 91.
