= 1965 in Norwegian football =

Football in Norway
- Season: 1965

Men's football
- 1. divisjon: Vålerengen
- 2. divisjon: Lisleby (Group A); Hødd (Group B)
- NM: Skeid

The 1965 season was the 60th season of competitive football in Norway.

== 1. divisjon ==
| Pos | Team | Pld | W | D | L | GF | GA | GD | Pts | Qualification or relegation |
|---|---|---|---|---|---|---|---|---|---|---|
| 1 | Vålerengen (C) | 18 | 12 | 3 | 3 | 39 | 25 | +14 | 27 | Qualification for the European Cup first round |
| 2 | Lyn | 18 | 12 | 2 | 4 | 57 | 22 | +35 | 26 | |
| 3 | Sarpsborg FK | 18 | 10 | 3 | 5 | 32 | 24 | +8 | 23 | |
| 4 | Steinkjer | 18 | 9 | 3 | 6 | 27 | 21 | +6 | 21 | |
| 5 | Fredrikstad | 18 | 8 | 4 | 6 | 40 | 31 | +9 | 20 | |
| 6 | Skeid | 18 | 8 | 1 | 9 | 28 | 30 | −2 | 17 | Qualification for the Cup Winners' Cup first round |
| 7 | Odd | 18 | 7 | 2 | 9 | 30 | 35 | −5 | 16 | |
| 8 | Frigg | 18 | 5 | 5 | 8 | 22 | 30 | −8 | 15 | Qualification for the Inter-Cities Fairs Cup first round |
| 9 | Viking (R) | 18 | 5 | 3 | 10 | 20 | 32 | −12 | 13 | Relegation to Second Division |
| 10 | Sandefjord BK (R) | 18 | 0 | 2 | 16 | 12 | 57 | −45 | 2 | Relegation to Second Division |

Source: NIFS
Rules for classification: 1) points; 2) goal difference; 3) number of goals scored.
(C) Champions; (R) Relegated

== 2. divisjon ==
=== Group A ===
| Pos | Team | Pld | W | D | L | GF | GA | GD | Pts | Promotion or relegation |
|---|---|---|---|---|---|---|---|---|---|---|
| 1 | Lisleby (C, P) | 14 | 8 | 3 | 3 | 20 | 14 | +6 | 19 | Promotion to First Division |
| 2 | Raufoss | 14 | 7 | 3 | 4 | 30 | 22 | +8 | 17 | |
| 3 | Gjøvik-Lyn | 14 | 6 | 4 | 4 | 31 | 19 | +12 | 16 | |
| 4 | Eik | 14 | 6 | 3 | 5 | 25 | 21 | +4 | 15 | |
| 5 | Lillestrøm | 14 | 6 | 1 | 7 | 29 | 29 | 0 | 13 | |
| 6 | Aurskog | 14 | 4 | 3 | 7 | 16 | 26 | −10 | 11 | |
| 7 | Østsiden (R) | 14 | 3 | 5 | 6 | 16 | 28 | −12 | 11 | Relegation to Third Division |
| 8 | Ørn (R) | 14 | 3 | 4 | 7 | 17 | 25 | −8 | 10 | Relegation to Third Division |

Source: rsssf.no
Rules for classification: 1) points; 2) goal difference; 3) number of goals scored.
(C) Champions; (P) Promoted; (R) Relegated

=== Group B ===
| Pos | Team | Pld | W | D | L | GF | GA | GD | Pts | Promotion or relegation |
|---|---|---|---|---|---|---|---|---|---|---|
| 1 | Hødd (C, P) | 14 | 7 | 5 | 2 | 41 | 24 | +17 | 19 | Promotion to First Division |
| 2 | Rosenborg | 14 | 8 | 3 | 3 | 36 | 20 | +16 | 19 | |
| 3 | Brann | 14 | 7 | 5 | 2 | 25 | 19 | +6 | 19 | |
| 4 | Nidelv | 14 | 4 | 7 | 3 | 24 | 21 | +3 | 15 | |
| 5 | Bryne | 14 | 6 | 2 | 6 | 28 | 26 | +2 | 14 | |
| 6 | Start | 14 | 5 | 2 | 7 | 23 | 23 | 0 | 12 | |
| 7 | Årstad (R) | 14 | 4 | 2 | 8 | 15 | 29 | −14 | 10 | Relegation to Third Division |
| 8 | Kvik (R) | 14 | 1 | 2 | 11 | 16 | 46 | −30 | 4 | Relegation to Third Division |

Source: rsssf.no
Rules for classification: 1) points; 2) goal difference; 3) number of goals scored.
(C) Champions; (P) Promoted; (R) Relegated

== 3. divisjon ==
=== Group Østland/Søndre ===
| Team | Pld | W | D | L | GF | GA | GD | Pts | Promotion or relegation |
|---|---|---|---|---|---|---|---|---|---|
| Snøgg | 14 | 8 | 2 | 4 | 35 | 21 | +14 | 18 | Promoted |
| Pors | 14 | 7 | 4 | 3 | 21 | 14 | +7 | 18 | |
| Moss | 14 | 8 | 1 | 5 | 32 | 21 | +11 | 17 | |
| Larvik Turn | 14 | 5 | 5 | 4 | 21 | 17 | +4 | 15 | |
| Runar | 14 | 6 | 2 | 6 | 31 | 20 | +11 | 14 | |
| Selbak | 14 | 5 | 2 | 7 | 17 | 25 | −8 | 12 | Relegated |
| Greåker | 14 | 4 | 3 | 7 | 18 | 28 | −10 | 11 | Relegated |
| Fram (Larvik) | 14 | 2 | 3 | 9 | 10 | 39 | −29 | 7 | Relegated |

=== Group Østland/Nordre ===
| Team | Pld | W | D | L | GF | GA | GD | Pts | Promotion or relegation |
|---|---|---|---|---|---|---|---|---|---|
| Strømsgodset | 14 | 9 | 3 | 2 | 45 | 21 | +24 | 21 | Promoted |
| Drafn | 14 | 9 | 3 | 2 | 40 | 23 | +17 | 21 | |
| Hamarkameratene | 14 | 8 | 4 | 2 | 38 | 16 | +22 | 20 | |
| Strømmen | 14 | 6 | 3 | 5 | 29 | 27 | +2 | 15 | |
| Sagene | 14 | 4 | 5 | 5 | 27 | 28 | −1 | 13 | |
| Mjøndalen | 14 | 6 | 0 | 8 | 29 | 35 | −6 | 12 | |
| Hamar IL | 14 | 1 | 4 | 9 | 24 | 50 | −26 | 6 | |
| Fremad | 14 | 1 | 2 | 11 | 20 | 52 | −32 | 4 | Relegated |

=== Group Sørland/Vestland, A ===
| Team | Pld | W | D | L | GF | GA | GD | Pts | Qualification or relegation |
|---|---|---|---|---|---|---|---|---|---|
| Vigør | 14 | 10 | 3 | 1 | 48 | 23 | +25 | 23 | Play-off |
| Donn | 14 | 10 | 1 | 3 | 38 | 18 | +20 | 21 | |
| Jerv | 14 | 9 | 1 | 4 | 47 | 31 | +16 | 19 | |
| Flekkefjord | 14 | 4 | 6 | 4 | 33 | 31 | +2 | 14 | |
| Sørfjell | 14 | 3 | 4 | 7 | 31 | 47 | −16 | 10 | |
| Grane (Arendal) | 14 | 4 | 2 | 8 | 21 | 34 | −13 | 10 | |
| Vindbjart | 14 | 2 | 4 | 8 | 17 | 29 | −12 | 8 | Relegated |
| Våg | 14 | 1 | 5 | 8 | 8 | 30 | −22 | 7 | Relegated |

=== Group Sørland/Vestland, B ===
| Team | Pld | W | D | L | GF | GA | GD | Pts | Qualification or relegation |
|---|---|---|---|---|---|---|---|---|---|
| Vard | 14 | 9 | 1 | 4 | 42 | 28 | +14 | 19 | Play-off |
| Haugar | 14 | 7 | 3 | 4 | 34 | 25 | +9 | 17 | |
| Jarl | 14 | 7 | 3 | 4 | 26 | 18 | +8 | 17 | |
| Ulf | 14 | 7 | 2 | 5 | 36 | 22 | +14 | 16 | |
| Nærbø | 14 | 6 | 2 | 6 | 23 | 29 | −6 | 14 | |
| Buøy | 14 | 4 | 4 | 6 | 28 | 33 | −5 | 12 | |
| Odda | 14 | 4 | 2 | 8 | 27 | 36 | −9 | 10 | Relegated |
| Djerv 1919 | 14 | 3 | 1 | 10 | 19 | 44 | −25 | 7 | Relegated |

=== Group Sørland/Vestland, C ===
| Team | Pld | W | D | L | GF | GA | GD | Pts | Qualification or relegation |
|---|---|---|---|---|---|---|---|---|---|
| Baune | 14 | 10 | 1 | 3 | 30 | 13 | +17 | 21 | Play-off |
| Jotun | 14 | 7 | 3 | 4 | 22 | 14 | +8 | 17 | |
| Varegg | 14 | 6 | 4 | 4 | 16 | 11 | +5 | 16 | |
| Ny-Krohnborg | 14 | 6 | 3 | 5 | 22 | 16 | +6 | 15 | |
| Sogndal | 14 | 5 | 3 | 6 | 26 | 23 | +3 | 13 | |
| Os | 14 | 6 | 0 | 8 | 27 | 25 | +2 | 12 | |
| Djerv | 14 | 6 | 0 | 8 | 18 | 28 | −10 | 12 | Relegated |
| Arna | 14 | 2 | 2 | 10 | 15 | 46 | −31 | 6 | Relegated |

=== Group Møre ===
| Team | Pld | W | D | L | GF | GA | GD | Pts | Qualification or relegation |
|---|---|---|---|---|---|---|---|---|---|
| Herd | 14 | 10 | 4 | 0 | 38 | 9 | +29 | 24 | Play-off |
| Molde | 14 | 10 | 1 | 3 | 37 | 16 | +21 | 21 | |
| Aalesund | 14 | 8 | 4 | 2 | 46 | 20 | +26 | 20 | |
| Langevåg | 14 | 6 | 4 | 4 | 34 | 24 | +10 | 16 | |
| Clausenengen | 14 | 5 | 2 | 7 | 23 | 31 | −8 | 12 | |
| Åndalsnes | 14 | 4 | 0 | 10 | 15 | 35 | −20 | 8 | |
| Nord-Gossen | 14 | 2 | 2 | 10 | 17 | 51 | −34 | 6 | Relegated |
| Kristiansund | 14 | 2 | 1 | 11 | 26 | 50 | −24 | 5 | Relegated |

=== Group Trøndelag ===
| Team | Pld | W | D | L | GF | GA | GD | Pts | Qualification or relegation |
|---|---|---|---|---|---|---|---|---|---|
| Falken | 14 | 12 | 0 | 2 | 36 | 12 | +24 | 24 | Play-off |
| Sverre | 14 | 8 | 5 | 1 | 30 | 16 | +14 | 21 | |
| Verdal | 14 | 5 | 4 | 5 | 20 | 17 | +3 | 14 | |
| Løkken | 14 | 4 | 5 | 5 | 20 | 19 | +1 | 13 | |
| Nessegutten | 14 | 4 | 5 | 5 | 16 | 22 | −6 | 13 | |
| Hasselvika | 14 | 4 | 2 | 8 | 13 | 25 | −12 | 10 | |
| Flå | 14 | 2 | 5 | 7 | 18 | 28 | −10 | 9 | Relegated |
| Brage | 14 | 3 | 2 | 9 | 13 | 27 | −14 | 8 | Relegated |

=== District IX ===
| Team | Pld | W | D | L | GF | GA | GD | Pts | Relegation |
|---|---|---|---|---|---|---|---|---|---|
| Bodø/Glimt | 10 | 8 | 1 | 1 | 37 | 8 | +29 | 17 | |
| Mo | 10 | 8 | 1 | 1 | 27 | 11 | +16 | 17 | |
| Stålkameratene | 10 | 6 | 0 | 4 | 25 | 20 | +5 | 12 | |
| Mosjøen | 10 | 2 | 2 | 6 | 9 | 27 | −18 | 6 | |
| Grand | 10 | 2 | 1 | 7 | 9 | 24 | −15 | 5 | |
| Saltdalkameratene | 10 | 1 | 1 | 8 | 12 | 29 | −17 | 3 | Relegated |

=== District X ===
| Team | Pld | W | D | L | GF | GA | GD | Pts | Relegation |
|---|---|---|---|---|---|---|---|---|---|
| Harstad | 10 | 8 | 0 | 2 | 31 | 13 | +18 | 16 | |
| Mjølner | 10 | 7 | 0 | 3 | 26 | 11 | +15 | 14 | |
| Narvik/Nor | 10 | 5 | 0 | 5 | 18 | 18 | 0 | 10 | |
| Tromsø | 10 | 4 | 1 | 5 | 15 | 17 | −2 | 9 | |
| Bardufoss/Omegn | 10 | 4 | 1 | 5 | 12 | 17 | −5 | 9 | |
| Furuflaten | 10 | 1 | 0 | 9 | 10 | 36 | −26 | 2 | Relegated |

=== District XI ===
| Team | Pld | W | D | L | GF | GA | GD | Pts | Relegation |
|---|---|---|---|---|---|---|---|---|---|
| Kirkenes | 10 | 7 | 3 | 0 | 24 | 10 | +14 | 17 | |
| Stein | 10 | 6 | 2 | 2 | 25 | 13 | +12 | 14 | |
| Alta | 10 | 4 | 2 | 4 | 19 | 18 | +1 | 10 | |
| Norild | 10 | 4 | 1 | 5 | 20 | 18 | +2 | 9 | |
| Vardø | 10 | 2 | 2 | 6 | 12 | 22 | −10 | 6 | |
| Honningsvåg | 10 | 1 | 2 | 7 | 8 | 27 | −19 | 4 | Relegated |

=== Play-off Sørland/Vestland ===
- October 3: Vard – Baune 1-3
- October 10: Vigør – Vard 0-3
- October 17: Baune – Vigør 4-0

| Team | Pld | W | D | L | GF | GA | GD | Pts | Promotion |
|---|---|---|---|---|---|---|---|---|---|
| Baune | 2 | 2 | 0 | 0 | 7 | 1 | +6 | 4 | Promoted |
| Vard | 2 | 1 | 0 | 1 | 4 | 3 | +1 | 2 | |
| Vigør | 2 | 0 | 0 | 2 | 0 | 7 | −7 | 0 | |

=== Play-off Møre/Trøndelag ===
- October 10: Herd – Falken 3-1
- October 17: Falken – Herd 5-0 (agg. 6-3)

Falken promoted

=== Northern Norway Championship ===
- Kirkenes – Harstad 2-2
- Bodø/Glimt – Kirkenes 2-1
- Harstad – Bodø/Glimt 3-0

| Team | Pld | W | D | L | GF | GA | GD | Pts | Result |
|---|---|---|---|---|---|---|---|---|---|
| Harstad | 2 | 1 | 1 | 0 | 5 | 2 | +3 | 3 | Champion |
| Bodø/Glimt | 2 | 1 | 0 | 1 | 2 | 4 | −2 | 2 | |
| Kirkenes | 2 | 0 | 1 | 1 | 3 | 4 | −1 | 1 | |

== 4. divisjon ==
=== District I ===
| Team | Notes |
|---|---|
| Askim | Play-off |
Sparta
Navestad
Torp
Gresvik
Ørje
Kvik (Halden)
Hafslund
Rapid
Borgen

=== District II, Group A ===
| Team | Notes |
|---|---|
| Slemmestad | Play-off |
Liv
Åssiden
Geithus
Skiold
Drammens BK
Svelvik
Jevnaker

=== District II, Group B ===
| Team | Notes |
|---|---|
| Kongsvinger | Play-off |
Asker
Stabæk
Kjellmyra
Eidsvold Turn
Spartacus
Kjelsås
Enebakk

=== District III, Group A (Oplandene) ===
| Team | Notes |
|---|---|
| Moelven | Play-off |
Stange
Redalen
Lena
Mesna
Brumunddal
Kapp
| Gjøvik SK | Disqualified |

=== District III, Group B1 (Sør-Østerdal) ===
| Team | Notes |
|---|---|
| Nordre Trysil | Play-off |
Koppang
Ytre Rendal
Engerdal
Nybergsund
Trysilgutten
Elverum
Innsats

=== District III, Group B2 (Nord-Østerdal) ===
| Team | Notes |
|---|---|
| Brekken | Play-off |
Røros
Ålen
Nansen
Folldal
Tynset
Kvikne
Alvdal

=== District III, Group B3 (Sør-Gudbrandsdal) ===
| Team | Notes |
|---|---|
| Faaberg | Play-off |
Fåvang
Kvam
Follebu
Østre Gausdal
Vinstra
Sør-Fron

=== District III, Group B4 (Nord-Gudbrandsdal) ===
| Team | Notes |
|---|---|
| Sel | Play-off |
Vågå
Dovre
Faukstad
Lesjå
Dombås

=== District IV, Group A (Vestfold) ===
| Team | Notes |
|---|---|
| Halsen | Play-off |
Sem
Tønsbergkameratene
Stag
Falk
Holmestrand
Tønsberg Turn
Store Bergan

=== District IV, Group B (Grenland) ===
| Team | Notes |
|---|---|
| Urædd | Play-off |
Borg
Herkules
Langesund
Brevik
Kragerø
Skiens BK
Storm

=== District IV, Group B (Øvre Telemark) ===
| Team | Notes |
|---|---|
| Gvarv | Play-off |
Heddal
Rjukan
Skade
Drangedal
Ulefoss
Sarphedin
Kjosen

=== District V, Group A1 (Aust-Agder) ===
| Team | Notes |
|---|---|
| Øyestad | Promoted |
Rygene
Risør
Arendals BK
Tvedestrand
Trauma

=== District V, Group A2 (Vest-Agder) ===
| Team | Notes |
|---|---|
| Mandalskameratene | Promoted |
Kvinesdal
Lyngdal
Giv Akt
Farsund
Otra
Torridal

=== District V, Group B1 (Rogaland) ===
| Team | Notes |
|---|---|
| Randaberg | Play-off |
Stavanger IF
Varhaug
Brodd
Egersund
Brusand
Enga
Hinna

=== District V, Group B2 (Rogaland) ===
| Team | Notes |
|---|---|
| Vidar | Play-off |
Klepp
Sola
Kopervik
Ålgård
Nord
Åkra
Havørn

=== District V, Group C (Sunnhordland) ===
| Team | Notes |
|---|---|
| Fonna | Play-off |
Stord
Trio
Halsnøy
Etne
Rubbestadnes

=== District VI, Group A (Bergen) ===
| Team | Notes |
|---|---|
| Sandviken | Play-off |
Hardy
Nordnes
Fjellkameratene
Nymark
Trane
Frøya

=== District VI, Group B (Midthordland) ===
| Team | Notes |
|---|---|
| Voss | Play-off |
Florvåg
Fana
Erdal
Radøy
Dale (Dalekvam)
Søfteland

=== District VI, Group C (Sogn og Fjordane) ===
| Team | Notes |
|---|---|
| Sandane | Play-off |
Høyang
Eid
Måløy
Florø
Dale (Sunnfjord)
Tornado
Stryn

=== District VII, Group A (Sunnmøre) ===
| Team | Notes |
|---|---|
| Velled./Ringen | Play-off |
Rollon
Spjelkavik
Sykkylven
Ørsta
Valder
Stordal
Blindheim

=== District VII, Group B (Romsdal) ===
| Team | Notes |
|---|---|
Eidsvåg (Romsdal)
Bryn
Fræna
Fiksdal
Træff
Harøy
Isfjorden
Tresfjord

=== District VII, Group C (Nordmøre) ===
| Team | Notes |
|---|---|
| Braatt | Play-off |
Todalen
Søya
Framtid
Sunndal
Dahle
Bøfjord
Nordlandet

=== District VIII, Group A (Sør-Trøndelag) ===
| Team | Notes |
|---|---|
| Rindal | Play-off |
Orkanger
Troll
Melhus
Orkdal
Oppdal
Støren
Dalguten

=== District VIII, Group B (Trondheim) ===
| Team | Notes |
|---|---|
| Freidig | Play-off |
Ranheim
Tryggkameratene
Heimdal
Trondheims/Ørn
Selsbakk
Strinda
Malvik

=== District VIII, Group C (Fosen) ===
| Team | Notes |
|---|---|
| Brekstad | Play-off |
Stadsbygd
Opphaug
Fevåg
Rissa
Beian
| Bjugn | Withdrew |

=== District VIII, Group D (Nord-Trøndelag/Namdal) ===
| Team | Notes |
|---|---|
| Stjørdals/Blink | Play-off |
Fram (Skatval)
Neset
Namsos
Vikavarvet
Henning
Aasguten
Sparbu

=== Play-off District I/IV ===
- Askim – Gvarv 5-0
- Urædd – Halsen 3-1
- Halsen – Askim 2-4
- Gvarv – Urædd 1-0
- Askim – Urædd 6-2
- Gvarv – Halsen 6-1

| Team | Pld | W | D | L | GF | GA | GD | Pts | Promotion |
|---|---|---|---|---|---|---|---|---|---|
| Askim | 3 | 3 | 0 | 0 | 15 | 4 | +11 | 6 | Promoted |
| Gvarv | 3 | 2 | 0 | 1 | 7 | 6 | +1 | 4 | Promoted |
| Urædd | 3 | 1 | 0 | 2 | 5 | 8 | −3 | 2 | |
| Halsen | 3 | 0 | 0 | 3 | 4 | 13 | −9 | 0 | |

=== Play-off District II/III ===
- Nordre Trysil – Brekken 2-0
- Sel – Faaberg 2-4
- Faaberg – Nordre Trysil 0-1
- Nordre Trysil – Moelven 2-4
- Kongsvinger – Slemmestad 1-0
- Moelven – Kongsvinger 1-1
- Slemmestad – Nordre Trysil 5-1
- Moelven – Slemmestad 0-0
- Kongsvinger – Nordre Trysil 2-0

| Team | Pld | W | D | L | GF | GA | GD | Pts | Promotion |
|---|---|---|---|---|---|---|---|---|---|
| Kongsvinger | 3 | 2 | 1 | 0 | 4 | 1 | +3 | 5 | Promoted |
| Moelven | 3 | 1 | 2 | 0 | 5 | 3 | +2 | 4 | Promoted |
| Slemmestad | 3 | 1 | 1 | 1 | 5 | 2 | +3 | 3 | |
| Nordre Trysil | 3 | 0 | 0 | 3 | 3 | 11 | −8 | 0 | |

=== Play-off District V ===
- Randaberg – Vidar 3-1
- Vidar – Randaberg 1-2 (agg. 2-5)

Randaberg promoted

- Vidar – Fonna 4-0 (in Kopervik)

Vidar promoted

=== Championship District V ===
- Øyestad – Mandalskameratene 4-0
- Mandalskameratene – Øyestad (not played)

=== Play-off District VI ===
- Sandviken – Sandane 3-2
- Sandane – Voss 2-1
- Voss – Sandviken 1-2

| Team | Pld | W | D | L | GF | GA | GD | Pts | Promotion |
|---|---|---|---|---|---|---|---|---|---|
| Sandviken | 2 | 2 | 0 | 0 | 5 | 3 | +2 | 4 | Promoted |
| Sandane | 2 | 1 | 0 | 1 | 4 | 4 | 0 | 2 | Promoted |
| Voss | 2 | 0 | 0 | 2 | 2 | 4 | −2 | 0 | |

=== Play-off District VII ===
- Velledalen/Ringen – Eidsvåg 1-1
- Eidsvåg – Braatt 1-5
- Braatt – Velledalen/Ringen 1-5

| Team | Pld | W | D | L | GF | GA | GD | Pts | Promotion |
|---|---|---|---|---|---|---|---|---|---|
| Velled./Ringen | 2 | 1 | 1 | 0 | 6 | 2 | +4 | 3 | Promoted |
| Braatt | 2 | 1 | 0 | 1 | 6 | 6 | 0 | 2 | Promoted |
| Eidsvåg | 2 | 0 | 1 | 1 | 2 | 6 | −4 | 1 | |

=== Play-off District VIII ===
- Freidig – Brekstad 4-2
- Rindal – Stjørdals/Blink 1-4
- Brekstad – Stjørdals/Blink 1-2
- Freidig – Rindal 1-2
- Stjørdals/Blink – Freidig 2-3
- Rindal – Brekstad 2-1

| Team | Pld | W | D | L | GF | GA | GD | Pts | Promotion |
|---|---|---|---|---|---|---|---|---|---|
| Freidig | 3 | 3 | 0 | 0 | 10 | 5 | +5 | 6 | Promoted |
| Stjørdals/Blink | 3 | 2 | 0 | 1 | 8 | 5 | +3 | 4 | Promoted |
| Rindal | 3 | 1 | 0 | 2 | 4 | 8 | −4 | 2 | |
| Brekstad | 3 | 0 | 0 | 3 | 4 | 8 | −4 | 0 | |

== Norwegian Cup ==
=== Final ===
24 October 1965

| Frigg | 2–2 (a.e.t.) | Skeid |
|---|---|---|
| Fjeldstad 14'; Bergersen 111' | Report | Bornø 60'; Sjøberg 114' |

Ullevaal Stadion, Oslo
Attendance: 18,821
Referee: Finn Bolstad (Skiold)

Replay

31 October 1965

| Frigg | 1–1 (a.e.t.) | Skeid |
|---|---|---|
| Pettersen 25' | Report | Sæthrang 75' |

Ullevaal Stadion, Oslo
Attendance: 8,826
Referee: Rolf Hansen (Skiens-Grane)

Second replay

7 November 1965

| Skeid | 2–1 | Frigg |
|---|---|---|
| Gulbrandsen 17'; Sæthrang 23' | Report | Schønfeldt 85' |

Ullevaal Stadion, Oslo
Attendance: 8,990
Referee: Sverre Eugen Olsen (Akademisk BK)

== Northern Norwegian Cup ==
=== Final ===
| Mjølner | 5–0 | Narvik/Nor |
|---|---|---|
| | Report |

== European Cups ==
=== Norwegian representatives ===
- Lyn (Champions Cup)
- Rosenborg (Cup Winners Cup)
- Vålerengen (Fairs Cup)

=== Champions Cup ===
==== First round ====
August 31: Lyn – Derry City (Northern Ireland) 5–3

September 9: Derry City – Lyn 5–1 (agg. 8–6)

=== Cup Winners' Cup ===
==== First round ====
August 24: KR Reykjavik (Iceland) – Rosenborg 1–3

September 12: Rosenborg – KR Reykjavik 3–1 (agg. 6–2)

==== Second round ====
October 24: Rosenborg – Dinamo Kiev (Soviet Union) 1–4

October 28: Dinamo Kiev – Rosenborg 2–0 (agg. 6–1)

=== Fairs Cup ===
==== First round ====
Vålerengen had a walkover.

==== Second round ====
October 18: Hearts (Scotland) – Vålerengen 1–0

October 27: Vålerengen – Hearts 1–3 (agg. 1–4)

== National team ==
| Date | Venue | Opponent | Res.* | Competition | Norwegian goalscorers |
|---|---|---|---|---|---|
| May 19 | Bergen | Thailand | 7–0 | Friendly | Arne Pedersen, Harald Berg (3), Erik Johansen, Olav Nilsen, Kjell Kaspersen |
| May 27 | Trondheim | Luxembourg | 4–2 | WCQ | Arne Pedersen, Per Kristoffersen, Erik Johansen, Kai Sjøberg |
| June 16 | Oslo | Yugoslavia | 3–0 | WCQ | Harald Berg, Finn Seemann, Olav Nilsen |
| August 8 | Helsinki | Finland | 0–4 | Friendly | |
| September 15 | Oslo | France | 0–1 | WCQ | |
| September 26 | Oslo | Denmark | 2–2 | Friendly | Erik Johansen, Ole Stavrum |
| October 31 | Stockholm | Sweden | 0–0 | Friendly | |
| November 7 | Belgrade | Yugoslavia | 1–1 | WCQ | Ole Stavrum |

Note: Norway's goals first
Explanation:

- F = Friendly
- WCQ = World Cup Qualifier
