= Deaths in September 1994 =

The following is a list of notable deaths in September 1994.

Entries for each day are listed alphabetically by surname. A typical entry lists information in the following sequence:

- Name, age, country of citizenship at birth, subsequent country of citizenship (if applicable), reason for notability, cause of death (if known), and reference.

== September 1994 ==
=== 1 ===
- Konrad Ameln, 95, German hymnologist and musicologist.
- Artur Balsam, 88, Polish-American classical pianist and pedagogue.
- Ellen Broe, 94, Danish nurse.
- Thomas Chastain, 73, American author of crime fiction, lung cancer.
- Hollis B. Chenery, 76, American economist.
- Bob Greenwood, 66, Mexican baseball player (Philadelphia Phillies).
- Wallis Mathias, 59, Pakistani cricket player.
- Gaston Péloquin, 54, Canadian politician, member of the House of Commons of Canada (1993-).
- Charles Saunders, 91, New Zealand rower and Olympian (1932).

=== 2 ===
- Roy Castle, 62, English dancer, singer, actor, television presenter and musician, lung cancer.
- Jesús Chousal, 83, Chilean Olympic cyclist (1936).
- Walter Chyzowych, 57, Ukrainian-American soccer player.
- Ricardo Conde, 63, Spanish Olympic athlete (1952).
- Édouard Delberghe, 58, French racing cyclist.
- Patrick Hughes, 85, Irish Olympic boxer (1932).
- Rajko Kušić, 39, Yugoslavian Olympic judoka (1980).
- Eugene Lawler, 61, American computer scientist.
- Giuseppe Martano, 83, Italian road bicycle racer.
- Mildred H. McAfee, 94, American academic, naval officer, and religious leader.
- Harold Lamont Otey, 43, American convicted murderer, execution by electrocution.
- Józef Światło, 79, Polish intelligence officer and defector .

=== 3 ===
- Vito Ananis, 79, American football player (Washington Redskins).
- James Thomas Aubrey, Jr., 75, American television and film executive, heart attack.
- Harold Brewster, 91, American Olympic field hockey player (1932).
- Jack Cassin, 79, Australian rules footballer.
- Nikos Hadjikyriakos-Ghikas, 88, Greek painter, sculptor, engraver, writer and academic.
- Monja Jaona, 84, Malagasy politician and nationalist.
- Major Lance, 55, American R&B singer, cardiovascular disease.
- Bernice Robinson, 80, American Civil Rights activist and education proponent.
- Glen Rose, 89, American college basketball and football coach (Arkansas Razorbacks).
- Billy Wright, 70, English football player, stomach cancer.

=== 4 ===
- Mark Bonham Carter, Baron Bonham-Carter, 72, English publisher and politician.
- Richard Martin, 76, American actor, leukemia.
- Sonia Martínez, 30, Spanish actress.
- Åke Ödmark, 77, Swedish high jumper and Olympian (1936).
- Ted Riches, 87, Australian rules footballer.
- Roger Thomas, 68, British politician and Member of Parliament.
- Robert Weaver, 70, American illustrator.

=== 5 ===
- Hank Aguirre, 63, American baseball player and businessman, prostate cancer.
- Shimshon Amitsur, 73, Israeli mathematician.
- Carl T. Burgess, 83, American politician.
- Allan Hender, 86, Australian rules footballer.
- José Martins, 88, Portuguese footballer and Olympian (1928).
- Bob Matheson, 49, American gridiron football player, lymphoma (Cleveland Browns, Miami Dolphins).
- John Newman, 47, Australian politician, murdered.
- Rudolf Raftl, 83, Austrian football goalkeeper.
- Karen Maud Rasmussen, 88, Danish Olympic swimmer (1924).
- Cliff Speegle, 76, American football player, coach, and college athletics administrator.
- Ike Williams, 71, American Lightweight world boxing champion.
- Fred Wilt, 73, American runner, Olympian (1948, 1952), and FBI agent.

=== 6 ===
- Louie Beltran, 58, Philippine journalist and columnist, heart attack.
- Rita Briggs, 65, American baseball player.
- Egon Eis, 83, Austrian screenwriter.
- Edward Russell Gaines, 67, New Zealand Catholic bishop.
- Nicky Hopkins, 50, English pianist and organist.
- Max Kaminsky, 85, American jazz trumpeter and bandleader.
- Duccio Tessari, 67, Italian director, screenwriter and actor, cancer.
- Paul Xuereb, 71, Maltese politician and President of Malta.

=== 7 ===
- James Clavell, 72, Australian-American author (Shōgun) and screenwriter (The Great Escape, The Fly), cancer.
- Eric Crozier, 79, British theatrical director and opera librettist.
- Georges Damitio, 70, French Olympic high jumper (1948, 1952).
- Chester A. Dolan, Jr., 86, American politician.
- Alfred Loomis, 81, American investment banker, sailor and Olympic champion (1948).
- Frederick Manfred, 82, American writer of Westerns, brain cancer.
- Dennis Morgan, 85, American actor-singer.
- Godfrey Quigley, 71, Irish actor (Barry Lyndon, All Dogs Go to Heaven, Get Carter), Alzheimer's disease.
- Nisith Ranjan Ray, 84, Indian historian and social activist.
- Abul Lais Siddiqui, 78, Pakistani author, researcher, and scholar of Urdu.
- John Vigurs, 64, British rower and Olympian (1960).
- Terence Young, 79, Irish film director (Dr. No, From Russia with Love, Thunderball), heart attack.

=== 8 ===
- Juan Alonso, 66, Spanish football player.
- Clara Breed, 88, American librarian.
- Peggy Guido, 82, English archaeologist and prehistorian.
- Walter Heiligenberg, 56, German scientist and neuroethologist, plane crash.
- Sister Parish, 84, American interior decorator and socialite.
- János Szentágothai, 81, Hungarian neuroscientist, academian and politician.
- Eijirō Tōno, 86, Japanese actor (Seven Samurai, Tokyo Story, Tora! Tora! Tora!), heart failure.

=== 9 ===
- Robert Austerlitz, 70, Romanian-American linguist.
- Tom Bawden, 81, Australian rules footballer.
- Käthe Braun, 80, German actress.
- Tom Burnette, 79, American football player (Pittsburgh Pirates, Philadelphia Eagles).
- Donald Court, 82, British paediatrician.
- Reg Downing, 89, Australian lawyer, trade unionist and politician.
- Alfred R. Loeblich, 80, American micropaleontology.
- Hugo Miranda, 64, Chilean Olympic cyclist (1952).
- Douglas Morrow, 80, American screenwriter and film producer, aneurysm.
- Patrick O'Neal, 66, American actor (The Way We Were, The Stepford Wives, Under Siege), respiratory failure.
- Jiří Prchal, 46, Czech Olympic cyclist (1972).

=== 10 ===
- Frank Broome, 79, English football player and manager.
- Amy Clampitt, 74, American poet and author.
- Mariateresa Di Lascia, 40, Italian politician, writer, and human rights activist, cancer.
- Yevgeniy Dolmatovsky, 79, Soviet/Russian poet and lyricist.
- Charles Drake, 76, American actor.
- Tom Haine, 61, American volleyball player and Olympian (1968).
- Caleb Martin, 70, American football player (Chicago Cardinals).
- Max Morlock, 69, German football player, cancer.

=== 11 ===
- Shimon Avidan, 83, Israeli officer.
- Gunnar Eide, 71, Norwegian footballer.
- Dernell Every, 88, American Olympic fencer (1928, 1932, 1948).
- Marianne Hold, 61, German movie actress, heart attack.
- Raffaele Sansone, 83, Italo-Uruguayan football player and coach, Uruguay.
- Sara Sothern, 99, American stage actress, and mother of Elizabeth Taylor.
- Jessica Tandy, 85, British actress (Driving Miss Daisy, Fried Green Tomatoes, Cocoon), Oscar winner (1990), ovarian cancer.

=== 12 ===
- Avtandil Ch'k'uaseli, 62, Soviet Georgian Olympic football player (1952).
- Frank Eugene Corder, 38, American truck driver and soldier, suicide by plane crash.
- Theo Crosby, 69, South African architect, writer and sculptor.
- Jean-Baptiste Duroselle, 76, French historian and professor.
- Tom Ewell, 85, American actor, and producer.
- Hunter Lane, 94, American baseball player (Boston Braves).
- Pat Screen, 51, American attorney, and politician.
- Frank White, 67, English botanist.
- Boris Borisovich Yegorov, 56, Soviet physician-cosmonaut, heart attack.

=== 13 ===
- Arthur Adel, 85, American astronomer and astrophysicist, cancer.
- Hind al-Husseini, 78, Palestinian woman.
- Erich Buschenhagen, 98, German general in the Nazi Germany Wehrmacht.
- Juozas Girnius, 79, Lithuanian existentialist philosopher.
- Richard Herrnstein, 64, American psychologist at Harvard University, lung cancer.
- Arthur Siegel, 70, American songwriter, heart failure.
- John Stevens, 54, English drummer.
- Woodie Wilson, 68, American stock car racing driver, cancer.

=== 14 ===
- William Berntsen, 82, Danish Olympic sailor (1948, 1952, 1960, 1964, 1968).
- Heinz Gerischer, 75, German scientist.
- Marika Krevata, 83, Greek actress.
- David van de Kop, 56, Dutch painter, draftsman and sculptor.

=== 15 ===
- Dave Diehl, 75, American football player (Detroit Lions).
- Ernst Fuchs, 57, Swiss racing cyclist.
- Haywood Henry, 81, American jazz baritone saxophonist.
- Héléna Manson, 96, French film actress.
- Moana Pozzi, 33, Italian pornographic actress, television personality and politician, liver cancer.
- Kai Sjøberg, 58, Norwegian footballer.
- Mark Stevens, 77, American actor, cancer.

=== 16 ===
- Johnny Berry, 68, English football player.
- Harry Chozen, 78, American baseball player (Cincinnati Reds).
- Jorge Luis Córdova, 87, Puerto Rican judge and politician.
- Jaywant Dalvi, 69, Indian writer.
- Felisa Rincón de Gautier, 97, Puerto Rican politician and women's rights activist, heart attack.
- Albert Decourtray, 71, French catholic cardinal, cerebral hemorrhage.
- Jack Dodson, 63, American actor (The Andy Griffith Show, Mayberry R.F.D., All's Fair).
- Dolly Haas, 84, German-American actress and singer, ovarian cancer.
- Bernie Leighton, 73, American jazz pianist.
- Noel Park, 73, Australian soldier, grazier and politician.
- C. K. Ra, 77, Indian painter and writer.
- Marshall Sprague, 85, American journalist and author.
- Maureen Stewart, 29, Costa Rican sprinter and Olympian (1988).

=== 17 ===
- Iris Adrian, 82, American actress and dancer.
- Arnold Badjou, 85, Belgian football goalkeeper.
- John Delafose, 55, American French-speaking Creole Zydeco accordionist.
- Gego, 82, Venezuelan visual artist.
- Vladimir Gershuni, 64, Soviet dissident and poet.
- Vitas Gerulaitis, 40, American tennis player, carbon monoxide poisoning.
- Katsuhiko Nakagawa, 32, Japanese actor and musician, leukemia.
- Edward James Patten, 89, American lawyer and politician, member of the United States House of Representatives (1963-1981).
- Sir Karl Popper, 92, Austrian-British philosopher, academic and social commentator.
- Katy Rodolph, 63, American alpine skier and Olympian (1952).
- Thorsten Sellin, 97, Swedish-American sociologist, penologist and criminologist.
- Ken Snelling, 75, American football player (Green Bay Packers).
- Peter Zaremba, 86, American Olympic hammer thrower (1932).

=== 18 ===
- Alexis Akrithakis, 60, Greek artist, heart attack.
- Hallgrímur Helgason, 79, Icelandic composer, violinist, musicologist, conductor, and music educator.
- Clarence Long, 85, American politician, member of the United States House of Representatives (1963-1985).
- Franco Moschino, 44, Italian fashion designer and HIV/AIDS activists, AIDS.
- Ivan Snoj, 70, Croatian handball coach and referee, official, journalist and publicist.
- Clarence Williams, 39, American gridiron football player (San Diego Chargers, Washington Redskins), shot.

=== 19 ===
- Anatoli Bulakov, 64, Soviet Russian boxer and Olympian (1952).
- Alberto Closas, 72, Spanish film actor, lung cancer.
- Joseph Iléo, 73, Congolese politician, Prime Minister.
- Frankie Kennedy, 38, Northern Irish flute and tin whistle player, Ewing's sarcoma.
- Don Lash, 82, American long-distance runner and Olympian (1936), spinal tumor.

=== 20 ===
- Juan Acosta, 87, Chilean Olympic long-distance runner (1936).
- Benny Baker, 87, American actor and comedian.
- Michael Dekel, 74, Israeli politician.
- Jimmy Hamilton, 77, American jazz clarinetist and saxophonist.
- Abioseh Nicol, 70, Sierra Leone Creole academic, diplomat, physician, and writer.
- Reto Rossetti, 85, British poet and Esperantist professor.
- Jule Styne, 88, English-born American songwriter and composer.
- Bjarne Øen, 95, Norwegian pilot and airforce general.
- Petr Čepek, 54, Czech actor, lung cancer.

=== 21 ===
- Jimmy Carter, 70, American world lightweight boxing champion
- Arthur B. Krim, 84, American entertainment lawyer and movie studio chairman.
- Louis Orvoën, 74, French politician.
- Russell Rowe, 79, Canadian politician.

=== 22 ===
- Teddy Buckner, 85, American jazz trumpeter, cancer.
- Maria Carta, 60, Italian folk music singer-songwriter, cancer.
- Igor Chislenko, 55, Soviet/Russian football player.
- Dorothy Dehner, 93, American painter and sculptor.
- Leonard Feather, 80, British-American jazz pianist, composer, and producer.
- Albert Hassler, 90, French Olympic ice hockey player and speed skater (1924, 1928, 1936).
- Gerhard von Hessert, 88, German bobsledder and Olympian (1932).
- Edoardo Molinar, 87, Italian cyclist.
- Hedwig Potthast, 82, German secretary and mistress of Reichsführer-SS Heinrich Himmler.
- Andrew Rothstein, 95, British journalist.
- Bud Sagendorf, 79, American cartoonist, brain cancer.
- Edward Shackleton, Baron Shackleton, 83, British geographer, Royal Air Force officer and politician.
- Fred Thomas Wood, 76, Chilean footballer.

=== 23 ===
- Jerry Barber, 78, American golfer.
- Robert Bloch, 77, American author (Psycho), cancer.
- Walter Gibbons, 40, American record producer and DJ, AIDS-related complications.
- Alfred Lemmnitz, 89, East German politician.
- Pye Lewis, 85, Australian rules footballer.
- Antanas Mikėnas, 70, Soviet Lithuanian Olympic racewalker (1956).
- Severino Minelli, 85, Swiss football player.
- Zbigniew Nienacki, 65, Polish writer.
- Jürgen Ohlsen, 77, German actor.
- Madeleine Renaud, 94, French actress.
- Nagendra Prasad Rijal, 67, Prime Minister of Nepal.
- Johannes van Damme, 59, Dutch engineer and businessman, executed .

=== 24 ===
- Buddy Amendola, 64, American college football coach (Central Connecticut Blue Devils).
- Barry Bishop, 62, American mountaineer, scientist, photographer and scholar, traffic accident.
- Kathleen Collins, 91, American film actress of the silent era.
- Carlos de Cárdenas, 90, Cuban Olympic sailor (1948, 1952, 1956).
- Joe Drake, 31, American football player (Philadelphia Eagles, San Francisco 49ers).
- Joe Madro, 81, American National Football League football coach.
- Ruth Niehaus, 69, German actress.
- Mark Prudkin, 96, Soviet/Russian actor of theater and cinema.
- Guido Santórsola, 89, Brazilian-Uruguayan composer, violinist, and conductor.
- Otto Friedrich Walter, 66, Swiss publisher, author and novelist.
- Muhammed Wattad, 57, Israeli Arab journalist, writer and politician, traffic collision.

=== 25 ===
- Mark Alexander Abrams, 88, British social scientist.
- Sašo Mirjanič, 26, Slovenian Olympic rower (1988, 1992), traffic collision.
- Antonio Negrini, 91, Italian Olympic cyclist (1924).
- Paul Oglesby, 55, American gridiron football player (Oakland Raiders).
- Lise Ringheim, 68, Danish film actress.
- Charles Gage Van Riper, 88, American speech therapist.
- Albert Watson, 72, American politician, member of the United States House of Representatives (1963-1971).

=== 26 ===
- Maurice Ashley, 87, British historian .
- Miguel Ángel Lauri, 86, Argentine football player.
- Louis Ferdinand, Prince of Prussia, 86, German member of the House of Hohenzollern.
- D. A. Webb, 82, Irish botanist, traffic collision.

=== 27 ===
- Nigel Bowen, 83, Australian lawyer, politician and judge.
- Frank Brickey, 82, American basketball and football coach (Arizona State Flagstaff–Lumberjacks).
- Denys Haynes, 81, English classical scholar, archaeologist, and museum curator, heart failure.
- Vernon Kirby, 83, South African tennis player.
- Carlos Lleras Restrepo, 86, Colombian politician and lawyer, respiratory failure.
- György Tóth, 79, Hungarian football player and coach.

=== 28 ===
- Urmas Alender, 40, Estonian singer and musician.
- Greg Latta, 41, American gridiron football player (Chicago Bears), heart attack.
- Abeti Masikini, 39, Belgian Congo singer, uterine cancer.
- José Francisco Ruiz Massieu, 48, Mexican political figure, homicide.
- Harry Saltzman, 78, Canadian theatre and film producer, heart attack.
- Owen Scheetz, 80, American baseball player (Washington Senators).
- Robert L. F. Sikes, 88, American politician, member of the United States House of Representatives (1941-1944, 1945-1979).
- K. A. Thangavelu, 77, Indian actor and comedian.
- Ze'ev Tzur, 83, Israeli politician.

=== 29 ===
- Ray Bamford, 79, Australian rules footballer.
- Bruce Edge, 70, Australian rules footballer.
- Cheb Hasni, 26, Algerian raï singer, terrorist attack.
- O. S. Nock, 89, British railway signal engineer and author.
- Frederick Schiller, 93, Austrian-British film actor.
- Jack Spinks, 64, American gridiron football player.

=== 30 ===
- Simeon Adebo, 80, Nigerian administrator, lawyer and diplomat.
- Wilhelm Ernst Barkhoff, 78, German solicitor, banker, social reformer and anthroposophist.
- Lina Basquette, 87, American actress, lymphoma.
- Michael Flannery, 91, Irish republican and founder of NORAID.
- Edmund Giemsa, 81, Polish soccer player.
- Elmer Kolberg, 78, American football player (Philadelphia Eagles, Pittsburgh Steelers).
- André Michel Lwoff, 92, French microbiologist and Nobel Prize laureate.
- Pierre Sabbagh, 76, French television journalist, producer and director.
- Alex Scott, 34, British thoroughbred racehorse trainer, shot.
- Roberto Eduardo Viola, 69, Argentine military officer and President of Argentina.
- Sydney Walker, 73, American actor and voice artist, cancer.
