= 1974 Norwegian Football Cup =

Norgesmesterskapet i fotball for menn 1974

Tournament details
- Country: Norway
- Teams: 128 (main competition)

Final positions
- Champions: Skeid (8th title)
- Runners-up: Viking

The 1974 Norwegian Football Cup was the 69th edition of the Norwegian annual knockout football tournament. The Cup was won by Skeid after beating Viking in the cup final with the score 3–1. This was Skeid's eighth Norwegian Cup title.

== First round ==
Team 1	Score	Team 2
29 May 1974
Herkules	2–6	Odd
30 May 1974
Brann	5–1	Sogndal
31 May 1974
Askim	1–0	Asker
Bergsøy	3–4	Hødd
Bodø/Glimt	3–1	Grand Bodø
Bryne	4–1	Ålgård
Buøy	1–0	Haugar
Clausenengen	2–1	Træff
Donn	0–2	Vigør
Eidsvold Turn	1–2	Redalen
Eik	1–0	Fram (Larvik)
Erdal	3–1	Bjarg
Fredrikstad	3–0	Kvik (Halden)
Gjøvik-Lyn	0–1	Skeid
Harstad	1–1 (a.e.t.)	Mjølner
Holmestrand	3–1	Moss
Jotun	1–3	Laksevåg
Kirkenes	2–1	Polarstjernen
Kongsberg	0–2	Mjøndalen
Langevåg	4–2	Ellingsøy
Larvik Turn	6–0	Greåker
Lillehammer	0–2	Brumunddal
Lisleby	0–0 (a.e.t.)	Kongsvinger
Lunner	1–3	Raufoss
Løkken	1–2	Kristiansund
Manglerud/Star	1–0	Ull/Kisa
Molde	3–0	Åndalsnes
Mosjøen	0–2	Mo
Neset	3–1	Henning
Nidelv	0–2	Nessegutten
Nybergsund	0–2	HamKam
Ny-Krohnborg	2–0	Voss
Nymark	3–0	Florvåg
Odda	3–0	Baune
Os	4–0	Varegg
Pors	1–2	Urædd
Rosenborg	2–1	Verdal
Røros	5–0	Rendalen
Sandefjord BK	0–2	Kråkerøy
Skiold	0–1	Frigg
Skotterud	0–5	Sarpsborg
Slemmestad	1–4	Stabæk
Sparta	1–1 (a.e.t.)	Østsiden
Sprint/Jeløy	0–2	Lillestrøm
Stag	1–0	Snøgg
Steinkjer	3–2	Strinda
Stjørdals/Blink	4–2	Sverresborg
Stord	3–1	Arna
Strømsgodset	0–1	Jevnaker
Sunndal	1–0	Folldal
Sverre	0–1	Falken
Tromsø	6–0	Stein
Ulf	2–0	Stavanger
Vard	7–2	Vidar
Velledalen/Ringen	0–3	Skarbøvik
Vigrestad	5–3 (a.e.t.)	Klepp
Vikersund	1–3	Åssiden
Viking	6–0	Kopervik
Vindbjart	0–3	Start
Vålerengen	3–2	Grue
Ørsta	7–1	Tornado
Øvrevoll	1–2	Drafn
Aalesund	4–0	Herd
3 June 1974
Lyn	2–1	Sagene
Replay: 5 June 1974
Kongsvinger	2–1	Lisleby
Mjølner	2–0	Harstad
Østsiden	1–0	Sparta

== Second round ==
Team 1	Score	Team 2
12 June 1974
Drafn	0–1	Odd
18 June 1974
Jevnaker	2–0	Lyn
19 June 1974
Falken	0–2	Rosenborg
20 June 1974
Bodø/Glimt	3–0	Kirkenes
Bryne	9–1	Odda
Erdal	0–3	Brann
Frigg	1–0	Brumunddal
HamKam	5–0	Manglerud/Star
Kristiansund	0–3	Molde
Kråkerøy	2–0	Vålerengen
Laksevåg	0–1	Os
Langevåg	0–0 (a.e.t.)	Ny-Krohnborg
Lillestrøm	3–1	Kongsvinger
Mjølner	0–1	Tromsø
Mjøndalen	2–0	Stag
Mo	3–0	Nessegutten
Raufoss	3–0	Holmestrand
Sarpsborg	2–0	Eik
Skarbøvik	2–1	Hødd
Skeid	6–1	Redalen
Stabæk	2–0	Askim
Start	5–1	Buøy
Steinkjer	0–0 (a.e.t.)	Neset
Stjørdals/Blink	3–1 (a.e.t.)	Clausenengen
Stord	0–1	Viking
Sunndal	0–1	Røros
Ulf	2–0	Vard
Urædd	1–4	Fredrikstad
Vigrestad	4–0	Nymark
Vigør	1–0	Larvik Turn
Ørsta	3–3 (a.e.t.)	Aalesund
Åssiden	3–1	Østsiden
Replay: 27 June 1974
Neset	1–0	Steinkjer
Ny-Krohnborg	2–0	Langevåg
Aalesund	0–1	Ørsta

== Third round ==
Team 1	Score	Team 2
25 June 1974
Start	3–1	Ulf
Molde	4–0	Ørsta
26 June 1974
Rosenborg	8–0	Stjørdals/Blink
27 June 1974
Odd	2–0	Lillestrøm
Fredrikstad	3–1	Frigg
Viking	4–0	Vigør
Røros	0–1	Skeid
Os	0–0 (a.e.t.)	Skarbøvik
28 June 1974
Kråkerøy	1–2	Sarpsborg
Raufoss	4–2	Stabæk
HamKam	0–0 (a.e.t.)	Jevnaker
Åssiden	0–3	Mjøndalen
Tromsø	2–4	Bodø/Glimt
1 July 1974
Brann	4–0	Ny-Krohnborg
2 July 1974
Vigrestad	2–1	Bryne
4 July 1974
Neset	3–1	Mo
Replay: 2 July 1974
Skarbøvik	2–5 (a.e.t.)	Os
Replay: 4 July 1974
Jevnaker	0–4	HamKam

== Fourth round ==
Team 1	Score	Team 2
18 August 1974
Bodø/Glimt	2–1 (a.e.t.)	Rosenborg
Sarpsborg	3–2	HamKam
Os	0–3	Brann
Viking	2–1	Fredrikstad
Skeid	2–1	Vigrestad
Molde	2–1	Neset
Mjøndalen	1–3 (a.e.t.)	Raufoss
Odd	0–0 (a.e.t.)	Start
Replay: 28 August 1974
Start	5–1	Odd

== Quarter-finals ==
8 September 1974

Bodø/Glimt	2–1 (a.e.t.)	Sarpsborg
Mørkved 59', 107'		Fredriksen 7'

Aspmyra Stadion, Bodø
Attendance: 4,990
Referee: Rolf Haugen

8 September 1974

Raufoss	0–1	Skeid
		Thunberg 37'

Raufoss Stadion, Raufoss
Attendance: 3,000
Referee: Egil Bergstad

8 September 1974

Brann	2–1	Molde
Aase 70'; Blindheim 89'		Fuglset 88'

Brann Stadion, Bergen
Attendance: 17,500
Referee: Kaare Lindboe

8 September 1974

Start	1–2	Viking
Svendsen 85' (pen.)		Knutsen 77'; Berland 90'

Kristiansand Stadion, Kristiansand
Attendance: 7,997
Referee: Ivar Fredriksen

== Semi-finals ==
25 September 1974

Viking	5–0	Bodø/Glimt
Berland 3'; Paulsen 49', 51'; Slinning 56', 80'

Stavanger Stadion, Stavanger
Attendance: 15,500
Referee: Rolf Nyhus

25 September 1974

Skeid	3–1	Brann
Bornø 7'; Thunberg 33'; Johansen 81'		Austbø 60'

Ullevaal Stadion, Oslo
Attendance: 7,782
Referee: Svein-Inge Thime

== Final ==
20 October 1974
13:15 CET (UTC+1)

Skeid	3–1	Viking
Skjønsberg 40'; Thunberg 52', 89'	Report	Paulsen 50'

Ullevaal Stadion, Oslo
Attendance: 14,276
Referee: Egil Bergstad (Borre)

Skeid's winning squad: Per Egil Nygård, Harald Gjedtjernet, Jan Birkelund, Per Chr. Olsen, Georg Hammer, Trygve Bornø, Frank Olafsen, Tor Egil Johansen, Bjørn Skjønsberg, Stein Thunberg and Kai Arild Lund.
