= 1965 Norwegian Football Cup =

Norgesmesterskapet i fotball for menn 1965

Tournament details
- Country: Norway
- Teams: 128 (main competition)

Final positions
- Champions: Skeid (7th title)
- Runners-up: Frigg

The 1965 Norwegian Football Cup was the 60th edition of the Norwegian annual knockout football tournament. The Cup was won by Skeid after beating Frigg in the cup final. It took a two replays to decide the winner. This was Skeid's seventh Norwegian Cup title.

== First round ==
Team 1	Score	Team 2
Askim	1–2	Sarpsborg
Aurskog	4–0	Eidsvold Turn
Baune	3–1	Fana
Borg	1–4	Pors
Brekstad	1–3	Sverre
Djerv 1919	0–4	Bryne
Donn	5–2	Jerv
Drafn	2–1	Geithus
Eik	2–0	Asker
Falken	0–1	Bodø/Glimt
Flekkefjord	5–0	Grane (Arendal)
Fram (Larvik)	3–0	Skade
Fredrikstad	1–0	Gresvik
Fremad Lillehammer	1–2	Brumunddal
Gjøvik-Lyn	2–0	Mesna
Grorud	0–2	Frigg
HamKam	11–0	Redalen
Hasselvika	1–4	Rosenborg
Haugar	1–4	Buøy
Hødd	7–2	Åndalsnes
Jevnaker	1–0	Strømsgodset
Jotun	1–0	Sogndal
Kirkenes	0–2	Tromsø
Kongsvinger	0–5	Strømmen
Kristiansund	4–0	Rindal
Kvik (Halden)	0–2	Østsiden
Langesund	0–5	Larvik Turn
Langevåg	4–0	Måløy
Lillestrøm	1–2	Stange
Liull	1–2	Vålerengen
Lyn	4–0	Kampørn
Løkken	3–3 (a.e.t.)	Kvik (Trondheim)
Mandalskameratene	1–8	Vigør
Mjøndalen	1–2	Ørn
Moelven	2–1	Raufoss
Molde	4–0	Clausenengen
Moss	5–2	Spartacus
Narvik/Nor	3–5	Mjølner
Navestad	1–0	Greåker
Neset	0–3	Verdal
Nessegutten	3–1	Orkanger
Nidelv	5–0	Flå
Ny-Krohnborg	1–6	Brann
Odd	4–1	Brevik
Odda	1–7	Vard
Os	1–0	Arna
Randaberg	1–2	Ulf
Runar	1–0	Stag
Røros	1–3	Hamar
Sagene	7–1	Sandaker/Aasen
Selbak	2–0	Torp
Skeid	3–0	Liv
Snøgg	7–0	Drangedal
Stabæk	1–2	Lisleby
Start	4–1	Vindbjart
Stavanger	2–1	Jarl
Steinkjer	3–2	Brage
Store Bergan	0–3	Sandefjord BK
Varegg	?–?	Nordnes
Velledalen/Ringen	1–3	Herd
Viking	7–0	Nærbø
Våg	2–1	Sørfjell
Aalesund	7–0	Nord-Gossen
Årstad	6–1	Djerv
Replay
Kvik (Trondheim)	2–0	Løkken

== Second round ==
Team 1	Score	Team 2
Aurskog	4–2	HamKam
Bodø/Glimt	4–1	Tromsø
Brann	1–0	Nordnes
Brumunddal	1–6	Skeid
Bryne	2–5	Stavanger
Buøy	0–0 (a.e.t.)	Viking
Eik	7–1	Jevnaker
Frigg	1–1 (a.e.t.)	Jotun
Hamar	1–8	Lyn
Herd	1–2	Aalesund
Hødd	2–3	Kristiansund
Kvik (Trondheim)	4–3	Nessegutten
Larvik Turn	2–3	Drafn
Lisleby	9–0	Moelven
Molde	3–2	Langevåg
Os	1–2	Årstad
Pors	4–4 (a.e.t.)	Donn
Rosenborg	3–1	Mjølner
Runar	3–0	Fredrikstad
Sandefjord BK	2–0	Våg
Sarpsborg	0–0 (a.e.t.)	Selbak
Snøgg	2–0	Odd
Stange	1–5	Gjøvik-Lyn
Strømmen	4–3 (a.e.t.)	Moss
Sverre	0–1 (a.e.t.)	Nidelv
Ulf	3–3 (a.e.t.)	Flekkefjord
Vard	5–2	Baune
Verdal	0–3	Steinkjer
Vigør	6–1	Start
Vålerengen	3–2	Navestad
Ørn	3–2 (a.e.t.)	Fram (Larvik)
Østsiden	3–1 (a.e.t.)	Sagene
Replay
Donn	1–3	Pors
Flekkefjord	1–3	Ulf
Jotun	0–2	Frigg
Selbak	0–1	Sarpsborg
Viking	1–0 (a.e.t.)	Buøy

== Third round ==
Team 1	Score	Team 2
1 August 1965
Sarpsborg	4–4 (a.e.t.)	Østsiden
Viking	1–0 (a.e.t.)	Vard
Kristiansund	2–5	Aurskog
Lyn	2–1	Strømmen
Drafn	1–4	Frigg
Årstad	6–1	Ulf
Ørn	1–3	Vålerengen
Aalesund	3–2	Rosenborg
Stavanger	1–3	Brann
Lisleby	6–0	Snøgg
Vigør	1–1 (a.e.t.)	Eik
Skeid	4–0	Runar
Pors	1–3	Sandefjord BK
Gjøvik-Lyn	5–2	Molde
Steinkjer	4–1	Kvik (Trondheim)
Nidelv	5–1	Bodø/Glimt
Replay: 5 August 1965
Østsiden	2–1	Sarpsborg
Replay: Unknown date
Eik	5–0	Vigør

== Fourth round ==
Team 1	Score	Team 2
22 August 1965
Aurskog	0–5	Lyn
Brann	3–0	Lisleby
Eik	1–7	Skeid
Sandefjord BK	1–2	Gjøvik-Lyn
Frigg	3–0	Årstad
Steinkjer	3–2	Nidelv
Vålerengen	4–1	Aalesund
Østsiden	1–2	Viking

== Quarter-finals ==
Team 1	Score	Team 2
12 September 1965
Lyn	4–1	Viking
Brann	1–2	Skeid
Frigg	2–1	Vålerengen
Gjøvik-Lyn	5–0	Steinkjer

== Semi-finals ==
Team 1	Score	Team 2
15 October 1965
Lyn	1–3	Frigg
17 October 1965
Skeid	1–1 (a.e.t.)	Gjøvik-Lyn
Replay: 20 October 1965
Gjøvik-Lyn	0–1	Skeid

== Final ==
=== First match ===
24 October 1965

Frigg	2–2 (a.e.t.)	Skeid
Fjeldstad 14'; Bergersen 111'	Report	Bornø 60'; Sjøberg 114'

Ullevaal Stadion, Oslo
Attendance: 18,821
Referee: Finn Bolstad (Skiold)

=== Replay match ===
31 October 1965

Frigg	1–1 (a.e.t.)	Skeid
Pettersen 25'	Report	Sæthrang 75'

Ullevaal Stadion, Oslo
Attendance: 8,826
Referee: Rolf Hansen (Skiens-Grane)

=== Second replay match ===
7 November 1965

Skeid	2–1	Frigg
Gulbrandsen 17'; Sæthrang 23'	Report	Schønfeldt 85'

Ullevaal Stadion, Oslo
Attendance: 8,990
Referee: Sverre Eugen Olsen (Akademisk BK)

== Squads ==
Skeid: Kjell Kaspersen, Ragnar Næss, Kjell Wangen, Jan "Jonas" Gulbrandsen, Frank Olafsen, Finn Thorsen, Erik Mejlo, Per Egil Bjørnsen, Terje Gulbrandsen, Trygve Bornø, Kai Sjøberg, Pål Sæthrang, Terje Kristoffersen.

Frigg: Ebbe Gysler, Anders Svela, Tore Børrehaug, Jon Birch-Aune, Åge Solvang, Erik Hagen, Ole Erik Hansen, Tore Fjeldstad, Per Pettersen, Arne Bergersen and Erik Schønfeldt.
