= 1963 in Norwegian football =

Football in Norway
- Season: 1963

Men's football
- 1. divisjon: Brann
- 2. divisjon: Sandefjord BK (Group A); Raufoss (Group B)
- NM: Skeid

The 1963 season was the 58th season of competitive football in Norway.

== 1. divisjon ==
SK Brann won the league title in the league's first year as the 1. divisjon. It was Brann's second consecutive league title.

Pos	Team	Pld	W	D	L	GF	GA	GD	Pts	Qualification or relegation
1	Brann (C)	18	10	4	4	46	27	+19	24	
2	Lyn	18	10	3	5	38	28	+10	23	Qualification for the European Cup first round
3	Skeid	18	9	2	7	41	26	+15	20	Qualification for the Cup Winners' Cup first round
4	Fredrikstad	18	7	6	5	32	25	+7	20	
5	Frigg	18	6	6	6	31	40	−9	18	
6	Sarpsborg FK	18	6	5	7	26	35	−9	17	
7	Viking	18	6	5	7	26	37	−11	17	
8	Vålerengen	18	7	2	9	44	37	+7	16	Qualification for the Inter-Cities Fairs Cup first round
9	Steinkjer (R)	18	5	4	9	23	34	−11	14	Relegation to Second Division
10	Gjøvik-Lyn (R)	18	5	1	12	29	47	−18	11	Relegation to Second Division

Source: NIFS
Rules for classification: 1) points; 2) goal difference; 3) number of goals scored.
(C) Champions; (R) Relegated

== 2. divisjon ==
=== Group A ===
Pos	Team	Pld	W	D	L	GF	GA	GD	Pts	Promotion, qualification or relegation
1	Sandefjord BK (C, P)	14	11	2	1	38	13	+25	24	Promotion to First Division
2	Eik	14	8	4	2	30	18	+12	20	
3	Start	14	8	1	5	26	23	+3	17	
4	Haugar	14	7	1	6	33	29	+4	15	
5	Odd	14	4	3	7	27	27	0	11	
6	Ørn	14	4	3	7	22	26	−4	11	
7	Larvik Turn (R)	14	3	4	7	17	21	−4	10	Relegation to Third Division
8	Os (R)	14	2	0	12	13	49	−36	4	Relegation to Third Division

Source: rsssf.no
Rules for classification: 1) points; 2) goal difference; 3) number of goals scored.
(C) Champions; (P) Promoted; (R) Relegated

=== Group B ===
Pos	Team	Pld	W	D	L	GF	GA	GD	Pts	Promotion, qualification or relegation
1	Raufoss (C, P)	14	10	1	3	30	19	+11	21	Promotion to First Division
2	Lillestrøm	14	8	4	2	41	26	+15	20	
3	Rosenborg	14	6	4	4	36	23	+13	16	
4	Østsiden	14	7	2	5	37	30	+7	16	
5	Greåker	14	5	2	7	19	26	−7	12	
6	Kvik	14	3	5	6	16	22	−6	11	
7	Aalesund (R)	14	4	2	8	11	24	−13	10	Relegation to Third Division
8	Lisleby (R)	14	2	2	10	17	37	−20	6	Relegation to Third Division

Source: rsssf.no
Rules for classification: 1) points; 2) goal difference; 3) number of goals scored.
(C) Champions; (P) Promoted; (R) Relegated

== 3. divisjon ==
=== Group Østland/Søndre ===
Team	Pld	W	D	L	GF	GA	GD	Pts	Promotion or relegation
Fram (Larvik)	14	9	2	3	27	16	+11	20	Promoted
Moss	14	8	2	4	32	17	+15	18	
Askim	14	7	3	4	31	20	+11	17	
Runar	14	6	4	4	31	22	+9	16	
Sparta	14	5	4	5	21	18	+3	14	
Pors	14	6	2	6	21	21	0	14	Relegated
Rapid	14	2	4	8	17	29	−12	8	Relegated
Heddal	14	2	1	11	14	51	−37	5	Relegated

=== Group Østland/Nordre ===
Team	Pld	W	D	L	GF	GA	GD	Pts	Promotion or relegation
Strømmen	14	11	0	3	33	15	+18	22	Promoted
Åssiden	14	7	3	4	37	19	+18	17	
Mjøndalen	14	8	1	5	40	32	+8	17	
Sagene	14	7	1	6	27	24	+3	15	
Hamarkameratene	14	6	2	6	39	41	−2	14	
Aurskog	14	6	1	7	39	38	+1	13	
Asker	14	4	1	9	30	36	−6	9	
Kapp	14	2	1	11	21	61	−40	5	Relegated

=== Group Sørland/Vestland, A ===
Team	Pld	W	D	L	GF	GA	GD	Pts	Qualification or relegation
Donn	14	9	2	3	26	16	+10	20	Play-off
Vigør	14	8	1	5	31	24	+7	17	
Vindbjart	14	6	3	5	33	23	+10	15	
Grane (Arendal)	14	7	1	6	32	25	+7	15	
Flekkefjord	14	6	2	6	25	22	+3	14	
Jerv	14	6	2	6	32	30	+2	14	
Sørfjell	14	6	1	7	27	27	0	13	Relegated
Arendals BK	14	1	2	11	17	56	−39	4	Relegated

=== Group Sørland/Vestland, B ===
Team	Pld	W	D	L	GF	GA	GD	Pts	Qualification or relegation
Vard	14	10	1	3	36	17	+19	21	Play-off
Ulf	14	9	2	3	34	14	+20	20	
Bryne	14	8	2	4	41	24	+17	18	
Jarl	14	7	4	3	29	19	+10	18	
Stavanger IF	14	5	2	7	20	26	−6	12	
Djerv 1919	14	4	3	7	19	31	−12	11	
Egersund	14	3	4	7	18	31	−13	10	Relegated
Randaberg	14	1	0	13	17	52	−35	2	Relegated

=== Group Sørland/Vestland, C ===
Team	Pld	W	D	L	GF	GA	GD	Pts	Qualification or relegation
Årstad	14	12	1	1	42	5	+37	25	Play-off
Djerv	14	9	4	1	31	14	+17	22	
Varegg	14	9	0	5	26	21	+5	18	
Jotun	14	8	1	5	36	29	+7	17	
Nordnes	14	4	2	8	17	28	−11	10	
Hardy	14	4	2	8	15	27	−12	10	
Trane	14	2	3	9	11	27	−16	7	Relegated
Fana	14	1	1	12	14	41	−27	3	Relegated

=== Group Møre ===
Team	Pld	W	D	L	GF	GA	GD	Pts	Qualification or relegation
Hødd	14	12	1	1	65	15	+50	25	Play-off
Langevåg	14	11	2	1	62	17	+45	24	
Braat	14	7	3	4	35	29	+6	17	
Kristiansund	14	7	3	4	35	29	+6	17	
Molde	14	3	4	7	22	34	−12	10	
Clausenengen	14	4	1	9	23	41	−18	9	Relegated
Dahle	14	2	3	9	13	50	−37	7	Relegated
Træff	14	1	4	9	16	51	−35	6	Relegated

=== Group Trøndelag ===
Team	Pld	W	D	L	GF	GA	GD	Pts	Qualification or relegation
Nidelv	14	13	1	0	48	8	+40	27	Play-off
Nessegutten	14	8	2	4	30	18	+12	18	
Sverre	14	7	2	5	25	19	+6	16	
Brage	14	5	4	5	17	15	+2	14	
Freidig	14	5	2	7	28	24	+4	12	
Falken	14	5	2	7	19	35	−16	12	
Ranheim	14	3	3	8	16	35	−19	9	
Stjørdals/Blink	14	1	2	11	16	45	−29	4	Relegated

=== District IX ===
Team	Pld	W	D	L	GF	GA	GD	Pts	Qualification or relegation
Bodø/Glimt	10	9	1	0	45	10	+35	19	North Norwegian final
Mosjøen	10	6	0	4	26	21	+5	12	
Mo	10	6	0	4	21	23	−2	12	
Stålkameratene	10	4	0	6	20	17	+3	8	
Brønnøysund	10	2	1	7	18	34	−16	5	
Grand	10	2	0	8	12	37	−25	4	Relegated

Source: rsssf.no

=== District X ===
Team	Pld	W	D	L	GF	GA	GD	Pts	Qualification
Harstad	10	7	1	2	23	14	+9	15	North Norwegian final
Tromsø	10	6	1	3	14	12	+2	13	
Mjølner	10	5	1	4	27	18	+9	11	
Narvik/Nor	10	4	2	4	21	16	+5	10	
Mellembygd	10	2	2	6	13	21	−8	6	
Andenes	10	2	1	7	11	28	−17	5	

Source: rsssf.no

=== Play-off Sørland/Vestland ===
- Årstad - Donn 1 - 1
- Donn - Vard 2 - 1
- Vard - Årstad 1 - 2

Team	Pld	W	D	L	GF	GA	GD	Pts
Donn	2	1	1	0	3	2	+1	3
Årstad	2	1	1	0	3	2	+1	3
Vard	2	0	0	2	2	4	−2	0

- Donn - Årstad 0 - 5

Årstad promoted

=== Play-off Møre/Trøndelag ===
- Hødd - Nidelv 1 - 1
- Nidelv - Hødd 3 - 1 (agg. 4 - 2)

Nidelv promoted

=== North Norwegian Championship final ===
- Harstad - Bodø/Glimt 4-3 (aet.)

Harstad north Norwegian league champions (north Norwegian teams could not win promotion).

== 4. divisjon ==
=== District I ===
Team	Notes
Hafslund	Promoted
Kvik (Halden)
Navestad
Sprint/Jeløy
Selbak
Tune
Torp
Tistadealen
Gresvik
Mysen

=== District II, Group A ===
Team	Notes
Kjellmyra	Play-off
Drafn
Vestfossen
Slemmestad
Stabæk
Svelvik
Skiold
Grue

=== District II, Group B ===
Team	Notes
Strømsgodset	Play-off
Liv
Geithus
Drammens BK
Sandaker/Aasen
Røa
Liull
Raumnes/Årnes

=== District III, Group A (Oplandene) ===
Team	Notes
Fremad	Play-off
Hamar IL
Brumunddal
Redalen
Mesna
Gjøvik SK
Moelven
Skreia

=== District III, Group B1 (Sør-Østerdal) ===
Team	Notes
Koppang	Play-off
Ytre Rendal
Nybergsund
Elverum
Nordre Trysil
Trysilgutten
Innsats

=== District III, Group B2 (Nord-Østerdal) ===
Team	Notes
Røros	Play-off
Brekken
Ålen
Folldal
Tynset
Nansen
Tylldal

=== District III, Group B3 (Sør-Gudbrandsdal) ===
Team	Notes
Fåvang	Play-off
Kvam
Faaberg
Follebu
Østre Gausdal
Vinstra
Ringebu

=== District III, Group B4 (Nord-Gudbrandsdal) ===
Team	Notes
Vågå	Play-off
Sel
Faukstad
Dovre
Otta
Lesja
Dombås
Heidal	Withdrew
Lesjaskog	Withdrew

=== District IV, Group A (Vestfold) ===
Team	Notes
Stag	Play-off
Tønsbergkameratene
Sem
Tønsberg Turn
Holmestrand
Falk
Flint
Borre

=== District IV, Group B (Grenland) ===
Team	Notes
Urædd	Play-off
Borg
Langesund
Skiens-Grane
Skiens BK
Herkules
Kragerø
Gjerpen

=== District IV, Group B (Øvre Telemark) ===
Team	Notes
Snøgg	Play-off
Gvarv
Ulefoss
Rjukan
Skade
Drangedal
Skarphedin

=== District V, Group A1 (Aust-Agder) ===
Team	Notes
Nedenes	Promoted
Rygene
Risør
Tvedestrand
Dristug

=== District V, Group A2 (Vest-Agder) ===
Team	Notes
Mandalskameratene	Promoted
Farsund
Giv Akt
Våg
Lyngdal
Torridal

=== District V, Group B1 (Rogaland) ===
Team	Notes
Nærbø	Play-off
Buøy
Varhaug
Hinna
Ganddal
Figgjo
Moi
Vaulen

=== District V, Group B2 (Rogaland) ===
Team	Notes
Vidar	Play-off
Åkra
Klepp
Sola
Nord
Ålgård
Kopervik
Torvastad

=== District V, Group C (Sunnhordland) ===
Team	Notes
Odda	Play-off

(*) Table unknown

=== District VI, Group A (Bergen) ===
Team	Notes
Ny-Krohnborg	Play-off
Baune
Sandviken
Nymark
Laksevåg
Fjellkameratene
Bergens-Sparta

=== District VI, Group B (Midthordland) ===
Team	Notes
Arna	Play-off
Radøy
Voss
Erdal
Dale (Dalekvam)
Kjøkkelvik
Follese

=== District VI, Group C (Sogn og Fjordane) ===
Team	Notes
Sogndal	Play-off
Florø
Eid
Sandane
Dale (Sunnfjord)
Måløy
Høyang
Stryn

=== District VII, Group A (Sunnmøre) ===
Team	Notes
Herd	Play-off
Spjelkavik
Velled./Ringen
Rollon
Skarbøvik
Ørsta
Valder
Hareid

=== District VII, Group B (Romsdal) ===
Team	Notes
Åndalsnes	Play-off
Nord-Gossen
Eidsvåg (Romsdal)
Tresfjord
Bryn
Harøy
Isfjorden
Lyngstad

=== District VII, Group C (Nordmøre) ===
Team	Notes
Søya	Play-off
Sunndal
Framtid
Bøfjord
Todalen
Bjørn
Frei
Fjordguten

=== District VIII, Group A (Sør-Trøndelag) ===
Team	Notes
Løkken	Play-off
Melhus
Flå
Orkanger
Troll
Rindal
Oppdal
Orkdal

=== District VIII, Group B (Trondheim og omegn) ===
Team	Notes
Tryggkameratene	Play-off
Stavne
Strinda
Vestbyen
Heimdal
Trond
Malvik
National

=== District VIII, Group C (Fosen) ===
Team	Notes
Brekstad	Play-off
Hasselvika
Opphaug
Ørland Flystasjon
Fevåg
Rissa
Beian

=== District VIII, Group D (Nord-Trøndelag/Namdal) ===
Team	Notes
Verdal	Play-off
Fram (Skatval)
Vikavarvet
Henning
Neset
Snåsa
Malm
Bangsund

=== Play-off District II ===
- Strømsgodset - Kjellmyra 3 - 1
- Kjellmyra - Strømsgodset 3 - 2 (agg. 4 - 5)

Strømsgodset promoted

=== Play-off District III ===
- Koppang - Røros 3 - 1
- Våga - Fåvang 1 - 1 (after extra time)
- Fåvang - Vågå 5 - 3
- Fåvang - Koppang 3 - 2
- Fåvang - Fremad 1 - 4
- Fremad - Fåvang 4 - 0

Fremad promoted

=== Play-off District IV ===
- Urædd - Snøgg 1 - 2
- Stag - Urædd 2 - 2
- Snøgg - Stag 6 - 1

Team	Pld	W	D	L	GF	GA	GD	Pts	Promotion
Snøgg	2	2	0	0	8	2	+6	4	Promoted
Urædd	2	0	1	1	3	4	−1	1	
Stag	2	0	1	1	3	8	−5	1	

=== Play-off District V ===
- Nærbø - Vidar 1 - 1
- Vidar - Nærbø 0 - 0 (agg. 1 - 1)
- Vidar - Nærbø 1 - 0 (in Sandnes)

Vidar promoted

- Nærbø - Odda 3 - 0 (in Kopervik)

Nærbø promoted

=== Championship District V ===
- Mandalskameratene - Nedenes 4 - 4
- Nedenes - Mandalskameratene 6 - 4 (agg. 10 - 8)
- Nedenes - Vidar (not played)

=== Play-off District VI ===
Arna - Ny-Krohnborg 2 - 3 Sogndal - Arna 1 - 1 Ny-Krohnborg - Sogndal 4 - 0

Team	Pld	W	D	L	GF	GA	GD	Pts	Promotion
Ny-Krohnborg	2	2	0	0	7	2	+5	4	Promoted
Arna	2	0	1	1	3	4	−1	1	Promoted
Sogndal	2	0	1	1	1	5	−4	1	

=== Play-off District VII ===
- Søya - Herd 1 - 9
- Åndalsnes - Søya 7 - 3
- Herd - Åndalsnes 5 - 0

Team	Pld	W	D	L	GF	GA	GD	Pts	Promotion
Herd	2	2	0	0	14	1	+13	4	Promoted
Åndalsnes	2	1	0	1	7	8	−1	2	Promoted
Søya	2	0	0	2	4	16	−12	0	

=== Play-off District VIII ===
- Tryggkameratene - Brekstad 2 - 0
- Løkken - Verdal 3 - 2
- Verdal - Tryggkameratene 6 - 0
- Løkken - Brekstad 4 - 2
- Brekstad - Verdal 0 - 3
- Tryggkameratene - Løkken 0 - 1

Team	Pld	W	D	L	GF	GA	GD	Pts	Promotion
Løkken	3	3	0	0	8	4	+4	6	Promoted
Verdal	3	2	0	1	11	3	+8	4	Promoted
Tryggkameratene	3	1	0	2	2	7	−5	2	
Brekstad	3	0	0	3	2	9	−7	0	

== Norwegian Cup ==
Skeid won the 1963 cup, defeating Fredrikstad after extra time.

=== Final ===
27 October 1963

Skeid	2–1 (a.e.t.)	Fredrikstad
Sjøberg 50'; Sæthrang 118'	Report	Høili 19'

Ullevaal Stadion, Oslo
Attendance: 31,444
Referee: Kåre Furulund (Hasle-Løren)

== Northern Norwegian Cup ==
=== Final ===
Bodø/Glimt	2–2	Mjølner
	Report

Replay

Bodø/Glimt	3–1	Mjølner
	Report

== European Cups ==
=== Norwegian representatives ===
- Lyn (Champions Cup)
- Gjøvik/Lyn (Cup Winners Cup)

=== First round ===
September 10

- Lyn - Borussia Dortmund (FRG) 2-4

October 2

- Borussia Dortmund - Lyn 3-1 (agg. 7-3)

=== Cup Winners' Cup ===
September 8

- Apoel Nicosia (Cyprus) - Gjøvik/Lyn 6-0

September 29

- Gjøvik/Lyn - Apoel Nicosia 1-0 (agg. 1-6)

== National team ==
Date	Venue	Opponent	Res.*	Competition	Norwegian goalscorers
May 15	Oslo	Poland	2–5	Friendly	Jon Krogh, Arne Pedersen
June 4	Bergen	Scotland	4–3	Friendly	Arne Pedersen, Jon Krogh, Erik Johansen, Olav Nilsen
June 27	Helsinki	Finland	0–2	Friendly	
August 14	Gothenburg	Sweden	0–0	Friendly	
September 4	Szczecin	Poland	0–9	Friendly	
September 15	Oslo	Denmark	0–4	Friendly	
November 3	Zürich	Switzerland	2–0	Friendly	Roald Jensen, Erik Johansen
November 7	Glasgow	Scotland	1–6	Friendly	Per Kristoffersen

Note: Norway's goals first
