= Øivind Johannessen =

Norwegian footballer and manager (1924-1996)

Personal information
- Full name: Øivind Kiel Johannessen
- Date of birth: 21 September 1924
- Place of birth: Sandefjord, Norway
- Date of death: 11 May 1996 (aged 71)
- Position: Goalkeeper

Senior career*
Years	Team	Apps	(Gls)
1949–1950	Sandefjord BK		
1951	Skeid		
1951	Sandefjord BK		
1952–1960	Skeid		

International career
1949–1957	Norway B	5	(0)
1949–1952	Norway	4	(0)

Managerial career
- 1963: Vålerengen
- 1965–1966: Skeid
- 1967–1969: Norway junior
- 1970–1971: Norway
- 1972: Drafn
- 1974–1975: Vålerengen
- * Club domestic league appearances and goals

Øivind Kiel Johannessen (21 September 1924 – 11 May 1996) was a Norwegian football player and manager. As a player, Johannessen spent his career playing as a goalkeeper for Sandefjord BK and Skeid.

Johannessen was capped four times for Norway before he retired as a player in 1960. He was the manager of the Norway national football team from 1970 till 1971 and the first to select the Norway national team personally, not involving a selecting committee.

== Playing career ==
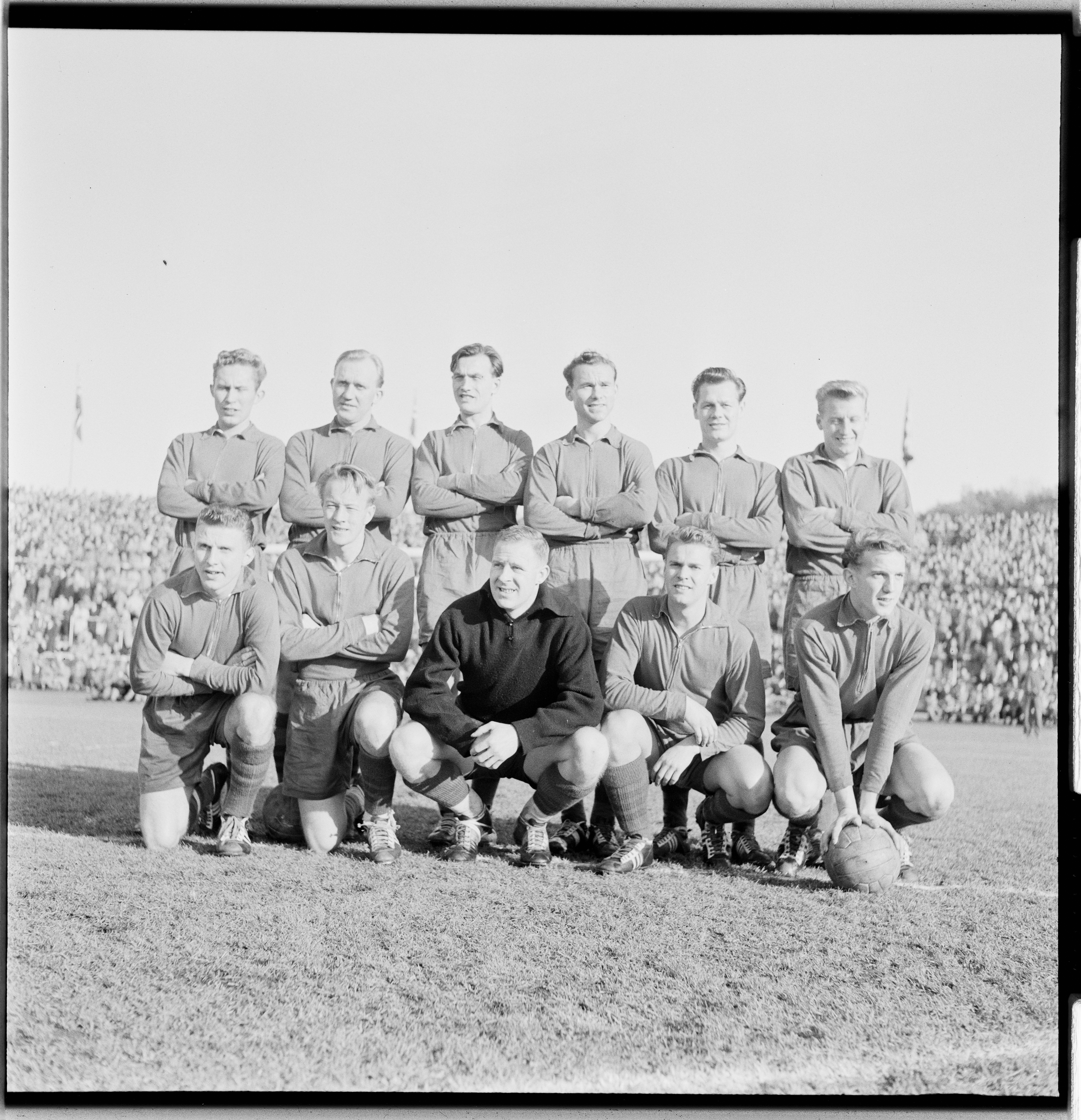
Skeid's winning team in the 1955 Norwegian Cup final against Lillestrøm. Øivind Johannessen in dark clothing in the front row.

Johannessen was born in Sandefjord. He started playing as a for local top division club Sandefjord BK in 1949. In 1951, he had a short spell in Skeid, before returning to Sandefjord Ballklubb. In the following season, Johannessen returned to Skeid where he stayed for the rest of his career. While at Skeid, Johannessen won the Norwegian Cup four times; in 1954, 1955, 1956 and 1958. Skeid won a silver medal in the league in the 1957–58 Hovedserien. He retired in 1960.

Johannessen was capped four times for Norway. On 2 October 1949, he got his international debut in a 3–3 draw against Sweden. He got his fourth and final appearance on 5 October 1952, in a 2–1 defeat to Sweden. In addition, Johannessen got five appearances for the Norway B team.

== Coaching career ==
Johannessen started his coaching career in Vålerengen in 1963. He moved on to Skeid in 1965, a year the club won the Norwegian Cup. He coached Norway's junior team in the period 1967–69. In 1970, Johannessen succeeded Wilhelm Kment as head coach for the Norway senior team. He led Norway in a total of 17 matches of which Norway won four. Johannessen was replaced by George Curtis in the beginning of the year 1972. He was head coach at third-tier club Drafn in the 1972 season. Johannessen returned as head coach for Vålerengen in 1974, a position he left at the end of the 1975 season.

== Honours ==
=== Player ===
Skeid

- Norwegian Cup: 1954, 1955, 1956, 1958

=== Manager ===
Skeid

- Norwegian Cup: 1965

== Managerial statistics ==
Team	Nat	From	To	Record				
Team	Nat	From	To	G	W	D	L	Win %
Norway	(Norway)	1 January 1970	31 December 1971	17	4	2	11	23.53
Total				17	4	2	11	23.53
