= Finn Thorsen =

Norwegian footballer and manager (born 1940)

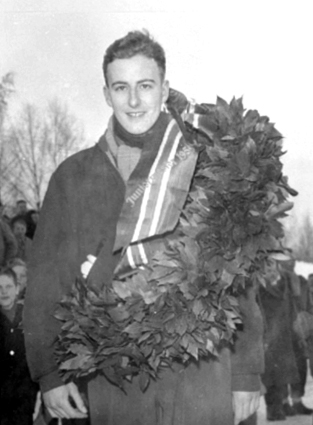
Thorsen in 1959

Finn Thorsen (born March 10, 1940) is a retired Norwegian footballer. He was a central defender who played 83 Premier Division games for Skeid between 1963 and 1967, and helped win the cup in 1963 and 1965 and the league championship in 1966. Thorsen later played 72 games for Ham-Kam between 1970 and 1973, scoring their first-ever Premier Division goal when they beat Viking 2-0 in 1970.

He was capped 48 times, and was awarded the Player of the Year title by VG in 1966. VG included him in their Team of the Year in 1964–66 and 1970–72.
