= Frank Olafsen =

Norwegian footballer, bandy player, and ice hockey player

Frank Willy Olafsen (born 20 April 1944) is a Norwegian former football player, bandy player and ice hockey player. With his club Skeid he won the Norwegian Football Cup three times, in 1963, 1965 and 1974, and the league in 1966. He played for the Norwegian national ice hockey team, and participated at the Winter Olympics in 1964, where he placed tenth with the Norwegian team.

He played eighteen matches for the national football team, and five matches for the national bandy team.
