= Erik Hagen (footballer, born 1941) =

Norwegian footballer

Personal information
- Date of birth: 30 July 1941 (age 85)
- Position: Defender

Senior career*
Years	Team	Apps	(Gls)
1961–1968	Frigg		

International career
1961–1962	Norway U21	2	(0)
1965–1966	Norway B	4	(0)
1962–1965	Norway	11	(0)
- * Club domestic league appearances and goals

Erik Hagen (born 30 July 1941) was a Norwegian football defender.

He played for Frigg between 1961 and 1968, finishing 4th in the league on four occasions, and being a runner-up in the 1965 Norwegian Football Cup. He represented Norway as an U21, B and senior international.
