= Amendola =

Surname list

Amendola (Italian pronunciation: [amˈɛndola]) is a surname of Italian origin. Notable people with the surname include:

- Anna Amendola (1931–2019), Italian actress
- Alessia Amendola (born 1984), Italian voice actress
- Beatriz Amendola, expert in the field of radiation oncology
- Buddy Amendola (1930–1994), college football coach
- Claudio Amendola (born 1963), Italian actor, director and television presenter
- Danny Amendola (born 1985), American football player
- Ferrante Amendola (1664–1724), Italian historical painter
- Ferruccio Amendola (1930–2001), Italian actor and voice actor
- Giorgio Amendola (1907–1980), Italian communist politician and writer, son of Giovanni Amendola
- Giovanni Amendola (1882–1926), Italian journalist and politician
- Giovanni Battista Amendola (1848–1887), Italian 19th-century sculptor
- Guiscardo Améndola (1906–1972), Uruguayan painter
- Mario Amendola (1910–1993), Italian screenwriter and film director
- Matt Ammendola (born 1996), American football player
- Orlando Amêndola, Brazilian swimmer, water polo player and rower
- Pino Ammendola (born 1951), Italian film actor
- Sal Amendola (born 1948), Italian-American comic book artist
- Salvador Amendola (born 1906, date of death unknown), Brazilian water polo player
- Scott Amendola (born 1969), American jazz drummer and composer
- Tony Amendola (born 1951), American actor
- Vincenzo Amendola (born 1973), Italian politician
