= 1963 Norwegian Football Cup =

Norgesmesterskapet i fotball for menn 1963

Tournament details
- Country: Norway
- Teams: 128 (main competition)

Final positions
- Champions: Skeid (6th title)
- Runners-up: Fredrikstad

The 1963 Norwegian Football Cup was the 58th season of the Norwegian annual knockout football tournament. Also that was the first all-Norwegian cup, as it was the first year clubs from Northern Norway were allowed to participate in the cup. Of the two northern Norwegian teams that participated this year, Bodø/Glimt made it all the way to the fourth round.

The surprise team of the cup this year was Sagene, a team that made it to the quarter-final, despite playing in the third division (tier three).

Skeid won the cup, beating Fredrikstad 2–1 in the final.

== First round ==
Team 1	Score	Team 2
Arendal	1–5	Start
Aurskog	2–1 (a.e.t.)	Kjellmyra
Bodø/Glimt	7–1	Norild
Brekstad	0–7	Rosenborg
Brumunddal	0–1	Raufoss
Bryne	5–0	Hardy
Dahle	2–3	Brage
Donn	3–1	Borg
Drammens BK	1–3	Frigg
Egersund	1–3	Vindbjart
Erdal	1–3	Årstad
Eik	6–2	Brevik
Fana	1–0	Fjellkameratene
Flekkefjord	1–1 (a.e.t.)	Jarl
Fram (Larvik)	0–0 (a.e.t.)	Drafn
Fredrikstad	3–1	Kvik (Halden)
Geithus	2–2 (a.e.t.)	Heddal
Gjøvik-Lyn	6–0	Kapp
HamKam	2–1	Fremad Lillehammer
Harstad	2–0	Mjølner
Haugar	5–2	Randaberg
Jerv	2–0	Skiens BK
Jotun	1–0	Sogndal
Kristiansund	3–1 (a.e.t.)	Troll
Kvik (Trondheim)	0–2	Falken
Langevåg	2–1	Velledalen/Ringen
Lillestrøm	5–1	Hamar
Lyn	3–0	Eidsvold Turn
Løkken	2–10	Hødd
Mesna	2–4	Strømmen
Mjøndalen	5–4	Jevnaker
Moelven	2–1	Asker
Navestad	3–2	Lisleby
Nidelv	3–1	Molde
Nordnes	1–2	Vard
Odd	10–2	Grane (Arendal)
Os	3–1	Varegg
Rakkestad	0–3	Sarpsborg
Ranheim	2–1	Braatt
Rapid	1–1 (a.e.t.)	Hafslund
Runar	2–4	Vestfossen
Røa	0–6	Østsiden
Sagene	4–1	Askim
Sandaker/Aasen	0–1	Vålerengen
Skeid	15–0	Raumnes & Årnes
Skiens-Grane	1–6	Pors
Sparta	5–0	Tune
Sprint/Jeløy	0–2	Greåker
Stabæk	1–1 (a.e.t.)	Moss
Stavanger	2–1	Djerv
Stjørdals/Blink	1–8	Steinkjer
Storm	1–4	Larvik Turn
Strømsgodset	1–2	Sandefjord BK
Sverre	6–2	Hasselvika
Sørfjell	1–0	Nedenes
Trane	0–7	Brann
Træff	1–5	Freidig
Verdal	4–1	Nessegutten
Vigør	1–4	Ulf
Viking	1–0	Klepp
Ørn	5–1	Tønsberg Turn
Aalesund	5–1	Clausenengen
Åssiden	2–1	Slemmestad
Replay
Jarl	4–4 (a.e.t.)	Flekkefjord
Drafn	6–1	Fram (Larvik)
Hafslund	1–0	Rapid
Heddal	2–4	Geithus
Moss	2–0	Stabæk
2nd replay
Flekkefjord	0–3	Jarl

== Second round ==
Team 1	Score	Team 2
Brage	0–6	Rosenborg
Brann	9–0	Fana
Donn	0–1	Vard
Drafn	2–1	Odd
Freidig	2–9	Lillestrøm
Frigg	4–2	Mjøndalen
Greåker	2–1	Sparta
Hafslund	2–4	Lyn
HamKam	2–7	Gjøvik-Lyn
Hødd	5–2	Aalesund
Jarl	2–2 (a.e.t.)	Viking
Kristiansund	2–0	Ranheim
Langevåg	2–3 (a.e.t.)	Falken
Larvik Turn	2–1	Sørfjell
Moss	1–3	Eik
Nidelv	2–5	Bodø/Glimt
Os	4–2	Jotun
Pors	3–0	Jerv
Raufoss	9–0	Moelven
Sandefjord BK	8–1	Navestad
Sarpsborg	0–0 (a.e.t.)	Sagene
Start	3–3 (a.e.t.)	Bryne
Steinkjer	4–0	Harstad
Strømmen	1–3	Fredrikstad
Ulf	3–1	Haugar
Verdal	2–4 (a.e.t.)	Sverre
Vestfossen	0–0 (a.e.t.)	Skeid
Vindbjart	2–4	Stavanger
Vålerengen	6–0	Geithus
Ørn	3–0	Åssiden
Østsiden	0–0 (a.e.t.)	Aurskog
Årstad	6–1	Djerv 1919
Replay
Aurskog	3–2	Østsiden
Bryne	6–0	Start
Skeid	7–0	Vestfossen
Sagene	4–2	Sarpsborg
Viking	2–1	Jarl

== Third round ==
Team 1	Score	Team 2
11 August 1963
Sagene	2–1	Ørn
Aurskog	0–1	Frigg
Stavanger	1–3	Sandefjord BK
Falken	0–3	Vålerengen
Fredrikstad	3–1 (a.e.t.)	Larvik Turn
Lyn	5–1	Hødd
Skeid	9–0	Pors
Lillestrøm	4–6	Ulf
Gjøvik-Lyn	6–0	Kristiansund
Drafn	2–1	Steinkjer
Eik	2–2 (a.e.t.)	Greåker
Bryne	1–2	Brann
Viking	3–0	Os
Årstad	1–2 (a.e.t.)	Vard
Rosenborg	2–4	Bodø/Glimt
Sverre	2–4	Raufoss
Replay: 21 August 1963
Greåker	1–4	Eik

== Fourth round ==
Team 1	Score	Team 2
1 September 1963
Sandefjord BK	1–2 (a.e.t.)	Skeid
Frigg	1–0	Bodø/Glimt
Vålerengen	1–1 (a.e.t.)	Drafn
Raufoss	1–5	Fredrikstad
Ulf	1–3	Gjøvik-Lyn
Vard	1–5	Lyn
Brann	0–1	Sagene
Eik	0–2	Viking
Replay: 11 September 1963
Drafn	1–3	Vålerengen

== Bracket ==
Quarter-finals
Gjøvik-Lyn (a.e.t.)	2
Sagene	1
Lyn	0
Skeid	5
Viking	1	0	2
Frigg	1	0	0
Fredrikstad	3
Vålerengen	0

Semi-finals
Gjøvik-Lyn	2
Skeid	3
Viking	0
Fredrikstad	2

Final
Skeid (a.e.t.)	2
Fredrikstad	1

== Quarter-finals ==
Team 1	Score	Team 2
25 September 1963
Gjøvik-Lyn	2–1 (a.e.t.)	Sagene
29 September 1963
Lyn	0–5	Skeid
Viking	1–1 (a.e.t.)	Frigg
Fredrikstad	3–0	Vålerengen
Replay: 2 October 1963
Frigg	0–0 (a.e.t.)	Viking
2nd replay: 9 October 1963
Viking	2–0 (Note: Played in Kristiansand.)	Frigg

== Semi-finals ==
Team 1	Score	Team 2
20 October 1963
Gjøvik-Lyn	2–3	Skeid
Viking	0–2	Fredrikstad

== Final ==
27 October 1963

Skeid	2–1 (a.e.t.)	Fredrikstad
Sjøberg 50'; Sæthrang 118'	Report	Høili 19'

Ullevaal Stadion, Oslo
Attendance: 31,444
Referee: Kåre Furulund (Hasle-Løren)

== See also ==
- 1963 Norwegian First Division
