= Amendola (disambiguation) =

Amendola is a surname.

Amendola may also refer to:

- Amendola Air Base, an Italian Air Force base
- Amendola Field, part of the Foggia Airfield Complex, a World War II Allied bomber base in Italy
- Amendola (Milan Metro), a railway station in Milan, Italy

== See also ==
- Amandola, a comune in the Province of Fermo, Italy
- Amendolea, a river in southern Italy
