= Jan Birkelund =

Norwegian footballer (1950-1983)

Personal information
- Full name: Jan Birkelund
- Date of birth: 10 November 1950
- Place of birth: Oslo, Norway
- Date of death: 28 February 1983 (aged 32)
- Position: Central defender

Senior career*
Years	Team	Apps	(Gls)
1968–1976	Skeid	223	(?)
1977–1978	Lillestrøm	44	(9)

International career
1973–1978	Norway	33	(0)
- * Club domestic league appearances and goals

Jan Birkelund (10 November 1950 – 28 February 1983) was a Norwegian footballer.

== Club career ==
A tall and strong central defender, at club level he played for Skeid and Lillestrøm. Birkelund won the Norwegian championship, the cup champion with Skeid in 1974, and won "The Double" with Lillestrøm in 1977. Lifting the Championship trophy in 1978 as well, the cup final turned out to be his last match. Shortly before the start of the 1979 season, Birkelund was diagnosed with a heart defect, and retired from football on the advice of his doctors. Four years later, Birkelund died as a result of cardiac arrest.

He played a total of 130 games in the First Division.

== Internationals career ==
In addition, he was capped 33 times for Norway.
