= Trygve Bornø =

Norwegian footballer (1942–2024)

Personal information
- Date of birth: 2 February 1942
- Place of birth: Harstad, Norway
- Date of death: 15 November 2024 (aged 82)
- Place of death: Oslo, Norway
- Position: Midfielder

Senior career*
Years	Team	Apps	(Gls)
1959–1963	Harstad		
1964–1978	Skeid	190	(4)

International career
1964	Norway U21	2	(1)
1965	Norway B	1	(0)
1966–1972	Norway	43	(0)
- * Club domestic league appearances and goals

Trygve Bornø (2 February 1942 – 15 November 2024) was a Norwegian footballer and sports administrator. A midfielder, he played for the Skeid and made 43 appearances for the Norway national team.

== Playing career ==
Bornø's career began in Harstad IL, but he made his name with Skeid where he played 419 matches between 1964 and 1978 (a number which includes all first-team matches, including friendlies). In the Norwegian Premier League, Bornø played 190 matches and scored four goals. He was a member of the Skeid side that became league champions in 1966.

VG awarded him the Player of the Year title in 1969.

He played twice and scored once for Norway U21. Between 1966 and 1972 he was capped 43 times for the Norway national team.

== Post-playing career ==
After ending his active career Bornø worked as secretary general for the Norwegian Football Association, from 1983 to 1985, and from 1996 to 1999.

== Death ==
Bornø died on 15 November 2024, at the age of 82.

== Honours ==
Skeid

- 1. divisjon: 1966

Sporting positions
Preceded by Nicolai Johansen	Secretary general of the Norwegian Football Association; 1983–1985	Succeeded by Svein Haagenrud
Preceded by Ivar Egeberg	Secretary general of the Norwegian Football Association; 1996–1999	Succeeded by Karen Espelund
