= Tore Børrehaug =

Norwegian footballer (1944-1998)

Personal information
- Date of birth: 13 March 1944
- Date of death: 11 February 1998 (aged 53)
- Position: Defender

Senior career*
Years	Team	Apps	(Gls)
1963–1968	Frigg		
1969–1972	Lyn		
1973–1974	Frigg		

International career
1962	Norway U19	2	(0)
1963–1967	Norway U21	13	(0)
1963–1965	Norway B	4	(0)
1963–1971	Norway	8	(0)
- * Club domestic league appearances and goals

Tore Børrehaug (13 March 1944 – 11 February 1998) was a Norwegian football defender.

He played for Frigg and Lyn, becoming league runner-up with Lyn and cup runner-up in 1965 with Frigg. He represented Norway as an U19, U21, B and senior international.
