= Kjell Wangen =

Norwegian footballer (1942–2019)

Personal information
- Full name: Kjell Erik Wangen
- Date of birth: 24 January 1942
- Date of death: 16 May 2019 (aged 77)
- Position: Defender

Senior career*
| Years | Team | Apps | (Gls) |
| 1960–1970 | Skeid | | |
- Raumnes og Årnes

International career
| 1960 | Norway u-19 | 2 | (0) |
| 1961–1962 | Norway u-21 | 3 | (0) |
| 1969 | Norway | 1 | (0) |

Managerial career
- Raumnes og Årnes (player-coach)
- * Club domestic league appearances and goals

Kjell Erik Wangen (24 January 1942 – 16 May 2019) was a Norwegian football defender.

He played for Skeid between 1960 and 1970, becoming league champion in 1966 and cup champion in 1963 and 1965. He represented Norway as a youth, under-21 and senior international. He was later player-coach of Raumnes og Årnes IL.
