= Morten Schønfeldt =

Norwegian handball player (born 1967)

Personal information
- Nationality: Norwegian
- Born: 18 November 1967 (age 58)

Sport
- Sport: Handball
National team
Years	Team	Apps	(Gls)
1988–1994	Norway	119	(112)

Teams managed
- Years: Team
- 2000–2002: Nordstrand IF

Morten Schønfeldt (born 18 November 1967) is a Norwegian handball player. Currently he is the marketing director in the Norwegian Olympic and Paralympic Committee and Confederation of Sports.

He played for the clubs Bækkelagets SK, SK Wing, Sandefjord HK, Fredensborg/Ski and Pfadi Winterthur. He made his debut on the Norwegian national team in 1988, and played 119 matches for the national team between 1988 and 1994, where he also captained the team. He participated at the 1993 World Men's Handball Championship, where Norway finished 13th.

He is a son of Norway international handballer Erik Schønfeldt.

Morten Schønfeldt also coached Nordstrand IF's women's team among others.

== Awards ==
Schønfeldt was selected player of the year in Norway in 1993. He was awarded Håndballstatuetten from the Norwegian Handball Federation in 2013.
