= Beatriz Amendola =

Uruguayan-American radiation oncologist

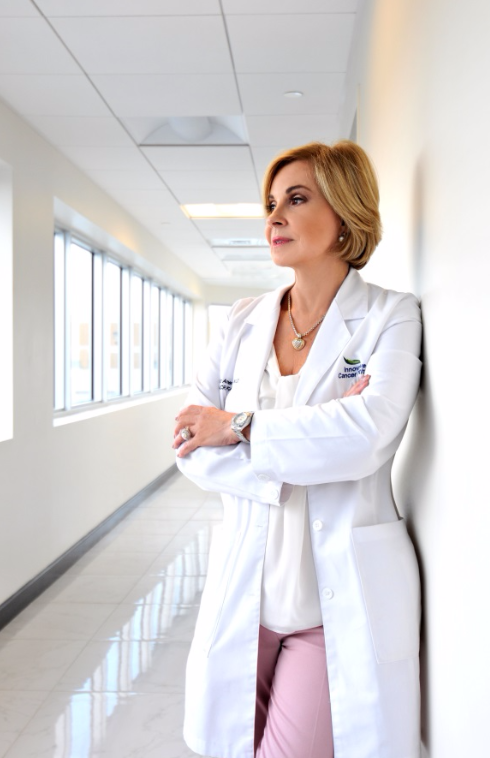
- Born: Montevideo, Uruguay

Academic background
- Education: Virginia Commonwealth University

Beatriz E. Amendola, MD FACR FASTRO FACRO, is a Uruguayan-American radiation oncologist. She currently is the head of the Innovative Cancer Institute in Miami.

== Career ==
Amendola was born and raised in Montevideo and applied for medical school in secret as her family wished her to continue a career in music. She earned an M.D. from the University of the Republic (Uruguay). She completed her residency at the Medical College of Virginia. She became board certified by the American Board of Radiology in 1980.

Upon immigrating to North America, Amendola founded the Innovative Cancer Institute, which she later expanded into a new facility to focus on radiosurgery and radiotherapy.

Amendola received a gold medal from the Circulo de Radioterapeutas Ibero Latino Americano (CRILA) and in 2015, became an honorary member of the Spanish Society of Radiation Oncology (SEOR) due to her contributions to radiation oncology in Spain.

== Most cited peer-reviewed publications ==
- Reaman G, Zeltzer P, Bleyer WA, Amendola B, Level C, Sather H, Hammond D. Acute lymphoblastic leukemia in infants less than one year of age: a cumulative experience of the Children's Cancer Study Group. Journal of Clinical Oncology. 1985 Nov;3(11):1513-21. Cited 197 times according to Google Scholar
- Amendola BE, Amendola MA, McClatchey KD, Miller JC. Radiation-associated sarcoma: a review of 23 patients with postradiation sarcoma over a 50-year period. American journal of clinical oncology. 1989 Oct;12(5):411-5. Cited 178 times according to Google Scholar
- Brown WT, Wu X, Fayad F, Fowler JF, Amendola BE, García S, Han H, De La Zerda A, Bossart E, Huang Z, Schwade JG. CyberKnife® radiosurgery for stage I lung cancer: results at 36 months. Clinical lung cancer. 2007 Sep 1;8(8):488-92. Cited 113 times according to Google Scholar

== Personal life ==
Amendola is married to fellow oncologist Marco Amendola, who serves as director of medical imaging.
