= Per Pettersen =

Norwegian footballer (born 1946)

Personal information
- Date of birth: 6 July 1946 (age 80)
- Place of birth: Oslo, Norway
- Position: Defender

Senior career*
Years	Team	Apps	(Gls)
1964–1973	Frigg		

International career
1964	Norway U19	4	(0)
1965–1966	Norway U21	5	(0)
1967–1973	Norway	35	(1)

Managerial career
- 1972–1974: Frigg
- 1978–1982: Norway women
- 1979: Frigg
- 1983–1984: Stabæk
- 1986–1987: Frigg
- * Club domestic league appearances and goals

Per Pettersen (born 6 July 1946) was a Norwegian football defender and later manager.

He played for Frigg between 1964 and 1973, finishing 4th in the league on three occasions, and being a runner-up in the 1965 Norwegian Football Cup. He represented Norway as a U19, U21 and senior international. In 1973 he was awarded the Player of the Year title by VG.

He managed Frigg, Norway women and Stabæk.
