= Ted Riches =

Australian rules footballer, born 1907

Personal information
- Full name: Edward Joseph Riches
- Born: 10 March 1907; Traralgon, Victoria
- Died: 4 September 1994 (aged 87)
- Height: 187 cm (6 ft 2 in)
- Weight: 83 kg (183 lb)

Playing career^{1}
Years	Club	Games (Goals)
1930	Geelong	1 (0)
- ^{1} Playing statistics correct to the end of 1930.

Edward Joseph Riches (10 March 1907 – 4 September 1994) was an Australian rules footballer who played with Geelong in the Victorian Football League (VFL).

Riches later served in the Australian Army during World War II.
