= Terje Gulbrandsen =

Norwegian footballer (1944-2015)

Personal information
- Full name: Svein Terje Gulbrandsen
- Date of birth: 29 November 1944
- Date of death: 25 September 2015 (aged 70)
- Position: Midfielder

Senior career*
Years	Team	Apps	(Gls)
1963–1970	Skeid	99	(8)
1971–1972	Drafn		
1973–1974	Vålerengen		

International career
1969	Norway	2	(0)
- * Club domestic league appearances and goals

Svein Terje Gulbrandsen (29 November 1944 – 25 September 2015) was a Norwegian footballer who played as a midfielder. At club level he won the Norwegian League once and the Cup twice with Skeid. He represented the Norway national football team on two occasions in 1969.

Gulbrandsen's daughter Solveig Gulbrandsen also became a professional footballer and won an Olympic gold medal with the Norway women's national football team.
