= Gunnar Eide (footballer) =

Norwegian footballer (1923–1994)

Personal information
- Full name: Gunnar Petter Eide
- Date of birth: 1 May 1923
- Place of birth: Stavanger, Norway
- Date of death: 11 September 1994 (aged 71)
- Position: Midfielder

International career
Years	Team	Apps	(Gls)
1952	Norway	1	(0)

Gunnar Eide (1 May 1923 – 11 September 1994) was a Norwegian footballer. He played in one match for the Norway national football team in 1952.
