= Vito Ananis =

American football player (1915–1994)

No. 44
- Position: Halfback

Personal information
- Born: January 25, 1915; Cambridge, Massachusetts, U.S.
- Died: September 3, 1994 (aged 79); Natick, Massachusetts, U.S.
- Listed height: 5 ft 10 in (1.78 m)
- Listed weight: 195 lb (88 kg)

Career information
- College: Boston College

Career history
- Washington Redskins (1945)

Career statistics
- Rushing yards: 8
- Yards per carry: 2.7
- Stats at Pro Football Reference

Vito Francis Ananis (January 25, 1915 – September 3, 1994) was an American football halfback in the National Football League for the Washington Redskins. He played college football at Boston College.

== Early life ==
Vito was the first child of Lithuanian immigrants, Joseph and Alice Ananis. They lived at 42b Union Street, and were members of the Immaculate Conception Catholic Church on Windsor Street. A second child, Julia, who later became known as Sally, and a son, Sigmond, who was known as Siggy, attended the Wellington School. Vito attended Rindge Technical High School where he excelled in athletics, most notably football, but also track, basketball, and hockey. Vito was recognized as an All-Scholastic football player and was considered by many as an outstanding back in the first half of the twentieth century at Rindge.

== College career ==
In 1939, Boston won nine out of its ten games, earning them their first post-season invitation: the 1940 Cotton Bowl.

In his senior season, he scored 12 touchdowns and was named to the All-East team and All-American team.

== Retirement ==
After retiring, Ananis became a high school coach for both football and basketball.

== Personal life ==
Ananis had a son, Mike, who also became a football player.

In 1948, Ananis was shot at by a car thief after he caught the car thief in the act of trying to steal his car. The shot missed and the car thief escaped.

== Legacy ==
Ananis was inducted into the Boston College Varsity Club Athletic Hall of Fame in 1988.
