= Erik Schønfeldt =

Norwegian handball player and footballer (born 1942)

Personal information
- Nationality: Norwegian
- Born: 19 November 1942
- Died: 12 February 2019 (aged 76) Oslo, Norway

Sport
- Sport: Handball
National team
Years	Team	Apps	(Gls)
1960–1968	Norway	45	(42)
Association football career
Senior career*
Years	Team	Apps	(Gls)
- Frigg
- * Club domestic league appearances and goals

Erik Schønfeldt (November 19, 1942 – February 12, 2019) was a Norwegian handball player and footballer.

He made his debut on the Norway national handball team in 1960, and played 45 matches for the national team between 1960 and 1968. He participated at the 1964 and 1967 World Men's Handball Championship.

Schønfeldt was awarded the Håndballstatuetten trophy from the Norwegian Handball Federation in 1999.

He was married to the Norwegian champion swimmer Lisbeth Søderstrøm, and was the father of Norway international handballer Morten Schønfeldt.

Schønfeldt was also an active football player. Playing for the club Frigg, he participated in the final of the 1965 Norwegian Football Cup.
