= Allan Hender =

Australian rules footballer, born 1908

Personal information
- Full name: Allan Hender
- Born: 23 April 1908; Stirling, South Australia
- Died: 5 September 1994 (aged 86); Ocean Grove, Victoria
- Original team: Port Adelaide
- Height: 175 cm (5 ft 9 in)
- Weight: 78 kg (172 lb)
- Position: Half-forward

Playing career^{1}
Years	Club	Games (Goals)
1928–1933	Port Adelaide	91 (44)
1934–1938	St Kilda	69 (41)
- ^{1} Playing statistics correct to the end of 1938.

Allan Hender (23 April 1908 – 5 September 1994) was an Australian rules footballer who played for the Port Adelaide Football Club in the South Australian National Football League (SANFL) and St Kilda Football Club in the Victorian Football League (VFL).
