= Egil Austbø =

Norwegian footballer (born 1947)

Personal information
- Full name: Egil Normann Austbø
- Date of birth: 12 January 1947 (age 79)
- Position: Forward

International career
Years	Team	Apps	(Gls)
1969–1974	Norway	3	(0)

Egil Austbø (born 12 January 1947) is a Norwegian footballer. He played in three matches for the Norway national football team from 1969 to 1974.
