= Erdal IL =

Norwegian sports club

- Full name: Erdal Idrettslag
- Founded: 27 June 1944
- Ground: Erdal idrettsplass, Erdal, Askøy Municipality
- League: 5. Divisjon
- 2012: Fifth Division, Hordaland 2, 6th
Home colours

Erdal Idrettslag is a Norwegian sports club from Askøy Municipality. It has sections for football and martial arts.

The club was founded on 27 June 1944. The club colors are red and white. The men's football team currently resides in the Fifth Division (sixth tier). It last played in the Third Division in 1996.
