= Buddy Amendola =

American football player and coach (1930–1994)

Biographical details
- Born: April 3, 1930
- Died: September 24, 1994 (aged 64); New Haven, Connecticut, U.S.

Playing career
- 1952–1953: Connecticut
- 1955: Connecticut
- Positions: Fullback, Linebacker

Coaching career (HC unless noted)
- 1956–1957: Columbia (assistant)
- 1958–1962: Hamden HS (CT)
- 1963–1964: Connecticut (DB)
- 1965–1981: Yale (DC)
- 1982–1986: Central Connecticut

Administrative career (AD unless noted)
- 1986–1989: Central Connecticut (assistant AD)

Head coaching record
- Overall: 14–34–1 (college)

Bonaventure "Buddy" Amendola (April 3, 1930 – September 24, 1994) was an American football coach. He served as the seventh head football at Central Connecticut State University in New Britain, Connecticut and he held that position for five seasons, from 1982 until 1986. His coaching record at Central Connecticut was 14–34–1.

He played high school football for Derby High School.

While playing for Connecticut he was named captain. He was selected to the Little All-America team as well as an All-East selection.

Amendola died on September 24, 1994, at the Hospital of Saint Raphael in New Haven, Connecticut.

== Head coaching record ==
=== College ===
Year	Team	Overall	Conference	Standing	Bowl/playoffs
Central Connecticut Blue Devils (NCAA Division II independent) (1982–1986)
1982	Central Connecticut	1–7–1			
1983	Central Connecticut	4–6			
1984	Central Connecticut	6–4			
1985	Central Connecticut	3–7			
1986	Central Connecticut	0–10			
Central Connecticut:		14–34–1			
Total:		14–34–1			
