= Per Kristoffersen =

Norwegian footballer (1937–2023)

Personal information
- Date of birth: 12 October 1937
- Place of birth: Fredrikstad, Norway
- Date of death: 2 March 2023 (aged 85)
- Place of death: Fredrikstad, Norway
- Position: Forward

Senior career*
Years	Team	Apps	(Gls)
1956–1968	Fredrikstad	194	(147)

International career
1955	Norway U19	1	(0)
1956–1959	Norway U21	5	(1)
1957–1966	Norway	25	(6)
1960–1966	Norway B	4	(2)
- * Club domestic league appearances and goals

Per Kristoffersen (12 October 1937 – 2 March 2023) was a Norwegian footballer who played as a forward for Fredrikstad and the Norway national team.

== Career ==
Born in Fredrikstad, Kristoffersen became league champion three times and won the Norwegian Cup four times with Fredrikstad FK. He became top scorer in the Norwegian top flight four times. He was capped 25 times and scored 6 international goals for the Norway national team.
