= 1966 Norwegian First Division =

22nd season of top-tier football league in Norway

1. divisjon
- Season: 1966
- Dates: 22 April – 23 October
- Champions: Skeid; 1st title
- Relegated: Lisleby; Hødd
- European Cup: Skeid
- Cup Winners' Cup: Fredrikstad
- Inter-Cities Fairs Cup: Lyn
- Matches played: 90
- Goals scored: 268 (2.98 per match)
- Top goalscorer: Per Kristoffersen (20 goals)
- Biggest home win: Fredrikstad 6–0 Hødd (23 October 1966)
- Biggest away win: Vålerengen 2–5 Steinkjer (8 May 1966); Steinkjer 1–4 Lyn (23 October 1966); Sarpsborg FK 0–3 Fredrikstad (15 October 1966)
- Highest scoring: Lisleby 6–1 Hødd (15 May 1966)
- Longest winning run: Vålerengen (5 games)
- Longest unbeaten run: Skeid (8 games)
- Longest winless run: Sarpsborg FK (7 games)
- Longest losing run: Hødd; Lisleby; Odd; Sarpsborg FK; Steinkjer; Vålerengen (3 games)
- Highest attendance: 12,452; Skeid 0–1 Fredrikstad (3 June 1966)
- Lowest attendance: 800; Lisleby 0–1 Odd (19 June 1966)
- Average attendance: 4,592 ▼8.8%

The 1965 1. divisjon was the 22nd completed season of top division football in Norway.

== Overview ==
It was contested by 10 teams, and Skeid won the championship, their first title. Both newcomers, Lisleby and Hødd, were relegated back to the 2. divisjon.

== Teams and locations ==
Note: Table lists in alphabetical order.

Team	Ap.	Location
Fredrikstad	21	Fredrikstad
Frigg	11	Oslo
Hødd	1	Ulsteinvik
Lisleby	7	Fredrikstad
Lyn	14	Oslo
Odd	17	Skien
Sarpsborg FK	16	Sarpsborg
Skeid	20	Oslo
Steinkjer	8	Steinkjer
Vålerengen	17	Oslo

== League table ==
Pos	Team	Pld	W	D	L	GF	GA	GD	Pts	Qualification or relegation
1	Skeid (C)	18	9	7	2	31	20	+11	25	Qualification for the European Cup first round
2	Fredrikstad	18	10	4	4	37	20	+17	24	Qualification for the Cup Winners' Cup first round
3	Lyn	18	6	9	3	28	24	+4	21	Qualification for the Inter-Cities Fairs Cup first round
4	Frigg	18	8	4	6	21	15	+6	20	
5	Vålerengen	18	9	1	8	32	35	−3	19	
6	Steinkjer	18	7	3	8	31	29	+2	17	
7	Odd	18	5	4	9	21	29	−8	14	
8	Sarpsborg FK	18	4	6	8	16	24	−8	14	
9	Lisleby (R)	18	4	5	9	22	26	−4	13	Relegation to Second Division
10	Hødd (R)	18	5	3	10	29	46	−17	13	Relegation to Second Division

Source: NIFS
Rules for classification: 1) points; 2) goal difference; 3) number of goals scored.
(C) Champions; (R) Relegated

== Results ==
Home \ Away	FFK	FRI	ILH	LIS	LYN	ODD	SRP	SKD	STN	VIF
Fredrikstad		3–3	6–0	1–1	0–0	3–1	4–0	4–1	2–1	3–0
Frigg	1–0		5–1	1–0	0–2	1–0	1–0	0–1	1–1	3–0
Hødd	1–3	0–2		1–2	4–2	2–2	3–1	2–3	3–0	1–3
Lisleby	1–2	1–0	6–1		2–2	0–1	0–0	0–1	1–0	0–1
Lyn	1–1	0–0	1–1	2–2		4–3	1–0	1–1	2–1	1–1
Odd	3–0	2–1	0–1	2–0	1–1		1–3	1–1	1–0	1–3
Sarpsborg	0–3	0–0	1–1	1–0	1–3	1–0		2–2	1–1	3–0
Skeid	0–1	2–0	4–2	2–2	2–1	0–0	0–0		1–1	5–1
Steinkjer	3–1	0–1	3–1	4–2	1–4	5–1	1–0	2–4		2–1
Vålerengen	3–0	2–1	2–4	4–2	3–0	3–1	3–2	0–1	2–5	

Source: NIFS.no
Legend: Blue = home team win; Yellow = draw; Red = away team win.

== Season statistics ==
=== Top scorer ===
- (Norway) Per Kristoffersen, Fredrikstad – 20 goals

=== Attendance ===
Pos	Team	Total	High	Low	Average	Change
1	Skeid	66,126	12,452	4,501	7,347	+22.2%
2	Vålerengen	52,774	10,811	2,400	5,864	−18.0%
3	Frigg	48,635	10,720	2,000	5,404	−4.8%
4	Lyn	48,432	10,000	1,580	5,381	−31.9%
5	Hødd	47,671	7,500	2,800	5,297	n/a^{2}
6	Fredrikstad	41,497	6,900	2,821	4,611	+27.9%
7	Odd	32,944	7,341	2,100	3,660	+7.8%
8	Steinkjer	30,500	7,000	1,800	3,389	−31.5%
9	Lisleby	24,418	5,200	800	2,713	n/a^{2}
10	Sarpsborg FK	20,253	4,665	1,002	2,250	−42.3%
	League total	413,250	12,452	800	4,592	−8.8%

Source: nifs.no
Notes:
2: Team played last season in 2. divisjon.
