= Kai Sjøberg =

Norwegian footballer (1936-1994)

Personal information
- Full name: Kai Otto Sjøberg
- Date of birth: 29 April 1936
- Date of death: 15 September 1994 (aged 58)
- Position: Forward

Senior career*
Years	Team	Apps	(Gls)
1959–1961	Hugin		
1961–1971	Skeid		
1972–1975	Eidsvold Turn		

International career
1965–1966	Norway B	2	(2)
1965–1967	Norway	4	(1)
- * Club domestic league appearances and goals

Kai Sjøberg (29 April 1936 – 15 September 1994) was a Norwegian football striker. He mainly played for Skeid, becoming league champion in 1966 and cup champion in 1963 and 1965. He represented Norway as a B and senior international.
