= Pål Sæthrang =

Norwegian footballer (1945-2004)

Personal information
- Full name: Pål Carsten Sæthrang
- Date of birth: 10 June 1945
- Date of death: 18 September 2004 (aged 59)
- Position: Forward

Senior career*
Years	Team	Apps	(Gls)
1963–1969	Skeid		

International career
1964–1967	Norway u-21	5	(4)
1967–1969	Norway	6	(1)
- * Club domestic league appearances and goals

Pål Sæthrang (10 June 1945 – 18 September 2004) was a Norwegian football striker.

His father Paul Sæthrang was also capped for Norway. They were the second father-son combination to be capped, after Rolf Pedersen and Rolf Birger Pedersen.

Pål Sæthrang played for Skeid between 1963 and 1969, becoming league champion in 1966 and cup champion in 1963 and 1965. He represented Norway as an under-21 and senior international.
