= Nidelv IL =

Norwegian sports club

- Full name: Nidelv IL
- Founded: 19 October 1930
- Ground: Tempe stadion, Trondheim
- League: Fifth Division
Home colours

Nidelv Idrettslag is a Norwegian sports club from Trondheim, Sør-Trøndelag. It has sections for association football, team handball, floorball, track and field, weightlifting and Nordic skiing. Nidelv IL ski also owns, and organises the annual Nardorennet and football organises the Nidelv Cup every autumn. The sports team also has its own salmon dam in Nidelva.

== History ==
The team is an amalgamation of the sports teams Nidarvoll AIL, founded on 15 November 1934, and Tempe IL, founded on 19 October 1930. The teams were merged into Nidelv IL in 1952.

In 1936, the Bjørnåsen ski jump was built, with a critical point of 40 meters. The hill record was 52.5 metres. After the World War II, Nidelv IL was able to buy Tempebanen from the municipality.

In 1946, a motorcycle speedway track was located around the pitch and it hosted the final of the Norwegian Individual Speedway Championship.

In 1991, the women's handball team moved up to 1 division.

In 1998, the athletics department took over the Trondheim Marathon, which was started in 1969, under the name Studentmaraton, which was organised by the students at NTH. Changed name to Trondheim Marathon In 1982. When athletics took over the race, the extra name Thorleif Rekkebo's memory run was added for a few years. Today, Nidelv IL athletics and skiing owns the Trondheim Marathon brand, which they organize together with Bedriftsidretten Midt-Norge Sør. Norway's oldest Marathon race.

Nidelv's senior team for men in football plays at level 6 in the 5. division (2011) after two consecutive relegations since 2009. And Nidelv's women's team plays in the 4th division. The men's team played at the second highest level, which was then called the 2nd division, in 2. division football for men in 1964, 1965, 1966 and 1967.

Nidelv IL Senior men moved up to the 4th division after the 2022 season. Nidelv IL women continue one more season in the 4th division after a not so good start-up season. Nidelv IL also has two youth teams in J17 and Gutter 16 in the 2022 season where both teams played in the 1st division. Nineteen girls 17 won their 1st division in the autumn and thus played KM (district championship final) and came second.

The athletics department will organise NM athletics in 2026 at Øya stadium, better known as (Trondheim Stadium) together with Trondheim Friidrett and Ranheim Idrettslag.

== Notable athletes ==
- Anne Marie Woldseth Schølberg, athlete who won the King's Cup in athletics in 1953.
- Torleif Rekkebo, marathon runner who completed 266 marathons, which was a record for a Norwegian that stood until 2005.
- Lars Vikan Rise, ten-time champion who has NM gold from 2013 and 2014. Inne still has several club records for Nidelv IL athletics.

== Notable football players ==
- Harald Sunde Rosenborg Ballklub and Racing Mechelen. Several international matches for age-specific national teams and A national teams. Played in the second division for Nidelv when he made his debut in the A-National team. Stepped down as a playing coach in Orkanger IF Fotball before he again made a comeback in Rosenborg in 1977 and retired in 1979 after only playing 5 games that season.
- Rune Bratseth, Rosenborg Ballklub, SV Werder Bremen and the national team. Was captain both at Werder Bremen and the national team. Quit in 1995. But after quitting, Alex Ferguson tried to lure him to Manchester United for a comeback. Has also turned down AS Roma and Tottenham Hotspur FC Rune was also a talent in athletics, on 11/02/1982 he set a new club record for height without running at 1.54 m which stood until 11/03/2005 when Vikan Rise beat it by 1 cm, with a height of 1.55 m.
- Randi Leinan who was a talent in athletics, but became better known as a great scorer for Trondheims-Ørn, now better known as Rosenborg Ballklub Kvinner and world champion with the national team in 1995.
- Simen Wangberg who has played for Rosenborg Ballklub, Sportsklubben Brann, Tromsø Idrettslag and Stabæk Football. Also has several matches for age-specific national teams.
- Erling Næss, footballer who played in Nidelv until he made his debut for Rosenborg Ballklub 31.08.1968 played a total of 201 games for Rosenborg, was also captain and an important player for Rosenborg in the last years of his career.
- Trond Børge Henriksen who played in Nidelv until he went to Rosenborg Ballklub from the 1983 season. He got 193 games, 10 goals and 29 yellow cards, which is a club record. Also played 6 games for Strindheim Football in the 1994 season. 4 games U16 National team seasons 1979–80. Has been a coach in the Rosenborg system since 2006, also temporary head coach.
