= Norway national football B team =

Men's association football team

Norway
- Nickname(s): Løvene (The Lions)
- Association: Football Association of Norway
- Confederation: UEFA (Europe)
- FIFA code: NOR

First international
- Sweden B 3–1 Norway B (Stockholm, Sweden; 29 September 1929)

Biggest win
- Norway B 6–1 Finland B (Gjøvik, Norway; 14 August 1955)

Biggest defeat
- Sweden B 8–0 Norway B (Trollhättan, Sweden; 16 September 1956); Sweden B 10–2 Norway B (Växjö, Sweden; 19 September 1964)

The Norway national football B team was a secondary national association football team under the control of the Football Association of Norway.

The team was formed in 1929 and for the next decade played an annual match against Sweden B. From 1946 to 1966 the team started playing more matches, normally an annual match each against Denmark B, Finland B and Sweden B. The team went on a hiatus which has since only been broken twice, once in 1989 and for three matches in 2002. A handful of special occasions have occurred since.

== History ==
Norway B's first match was a 3–1 loss against Sweden B in Stockholm on 29 September 1929, which was also the debut game for Sweden B. The two teams would continue to play each other annually until 1939.

After a hiatus during the Second World War, Norway B was revived on 26 August 1945 with a 5–1 loss against Denmark B in Aarhus. Norway B would for the next two decades play two to four annual games, predominantly against the B-teams of Sweden and Denmark, and from 1951 Finland B. Only five times did Norway B play a non-Nordic opponent in this spree, a 1–0 home loss against Luxembourg B in 1950, a 2–2 home tie against Switzerland B in 1953, and two matches against the Netherlands B, losing 5–2 away in 1954 and 4–0 at home three years later. In between Norway B beat Romania B 2–1 away on 27 June 1956. Regular matches with Norway B ended on 17 September 1966 with a 5–4 loss against Sweden B.

The team was revived for a single match against England B, losing 1–0 at Stavanger Stadion on 22 May 1989.

Norway entered its B-team for the annual, four-nation Torneio Vale do Tejo in Portugal in January 2002. After holding Portugal B 1–1 after extra rounds, Norway lost 5–4 to the hosts in a penalty shootout. Norway finished last in the tournament after advancing losing a penalty shootout to Romania B after 2–2 at the end of extra time. The last time the Norway B team was deployed took place on 6 March 2002, in a 1–0 victory over Denmark B at Brøndby Stadion in Copenhagen. These three matches were all coached by A-team coach Nils Johan Semb.

== Nødlandslaget ==
The A team squad against Austria in the 2020–21 UEFA Nations League B on 18 November 2020 were effectively and treated as a national B team by media and supporters (nicknamed Nødlandslaget, lit. 'The emergency national team'), after the players and coaches that were originally supposed to play in the match were all sent in quarantine five days earlier after Omar Elabdellaoui tested positive for COVID-19, and a new squad had to be set up in just five days with a whole new player squad and coaching staff, who all received full A caps for playing in the match.

The team drew 1–1 after conceding a goal in injury time (A win would've promoted Norway to the 2022–23 UEFA Nations League A), but were received as heroic fighters back in Norway.

== Unionsduellen ==
Starting in 2024, Norsk Ligafotball (lit. 'Norwegian League Football'), the organisation that runs tiers 3 and 4 in the mens' Norwegian football system, set up a national team consisting of players from tier 3 (PostNord-ligaen) for annual matches against a similar team representing Sweden's tier 3 (Ettan Fotboll), called Unionsduellen (lit. 'The Union Duel'). The team does not operate as a part of the Football Association of Norway and does not wear the A team's jerseys, but its players are believed to remain eligible for the A team at any later time.

== Statistics ==
Norway B played 79 games. Its greatest victory was a 6–1 home victory over Finland B at Gjøvik Stadion on 14 August 1955. Norway B's greatest defeat occurred twice, both against Sweden B, 8–0 on 16 September 1956 and 10–2 on 19 September 1964.
