= Skeid Fotball =

Norwegian football club

Skeid
- Full name: Skeid
- Nickname: Oksene (The Bulls)
- Founded: 1 January 1915; 111 years ago
- Ground: Nordre Åsen Stadion; Oslo; Norway
- Capacity: 1100 seats
- Chairman: Jorgen Bjerke
- Head coach: Vilde Mollestad Rislaa
- League: 2. divisjon
- 2025: 1. divisjon, 16th of 16 (relegated)
Home colours	Away colours	Third colours

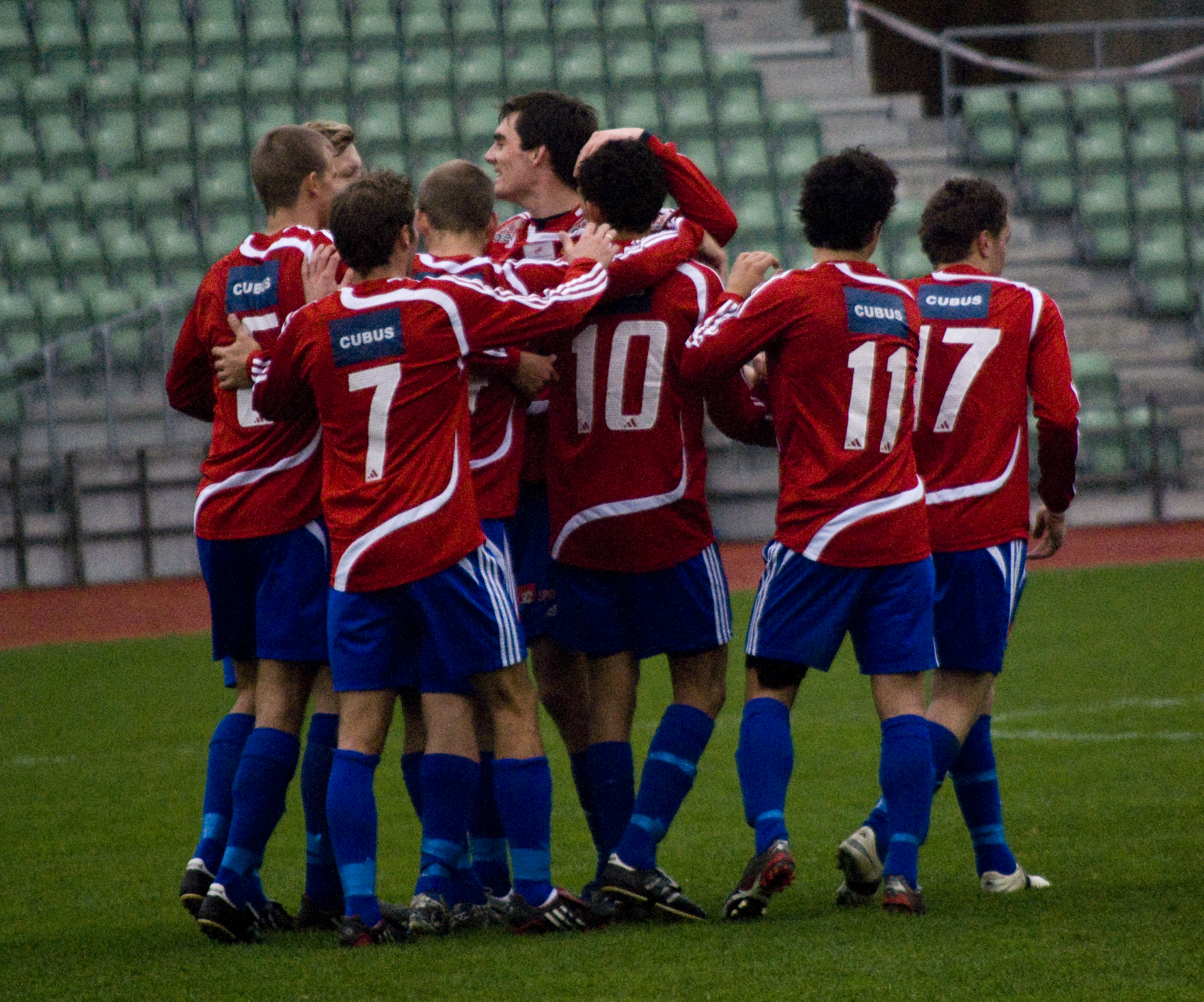
Skeid players celebrate a goal against Steinkjer FK on Bislett stadion in 2008. Skeid won the match 8–2.

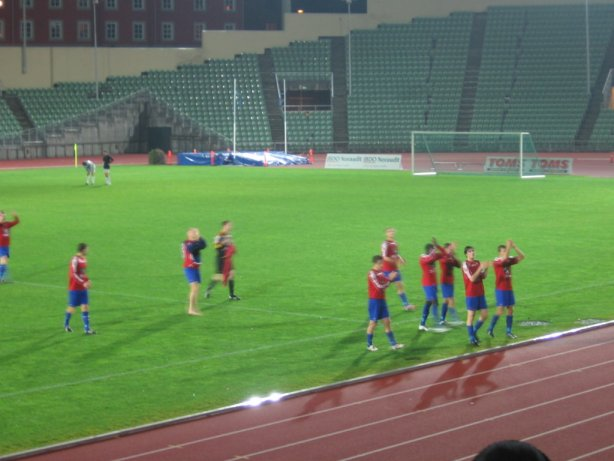
Skeid celebrate at Bislett

Skeid is a Norwegian football club from Oslo that currently plays in 2. divisjon the third tier of the Norwegian football league system. Its current home field is Nordre Åsen, after the club stopped playing at Bislett after the 2012 season. In past decades it has gained a reputation as a talent factory for the larger clubs in Norwegian football, and it has produced several players for the national team such as Daniel Braaten, Daniel Fredheim Holm, Omar Elabdellaoui and Mohammed Abdellaoue. Other notable players include Paul Miller. Skeid played in 1. divisjon in 2009 after a short stint in the 2. divisjon. They finished champions of the Second Group of 2. divisjon in 2008. However, Skeid relegated again to 2. divisjon at end of 2009 season in 16th and last position despite a good start. In 2021, Skeid won 2. divisjon group 1 and was promoted to the 1. divisjon.

In 2021, it was announced that Skeid will inherit “several millions” from the controversial Leif Hagen, also known as "Porno-Hagen". Hagen, who was a fan of Skeid was born and raised in Sagene, Oslo and died before Christmas in 2020 bequeathing a substantial amount to Skeid. In the media, there was speculation in values in the order of NOK 30 million (NOK).

Skeid decided that the money from Hagen will not be used short term, but function as a long-term fund and that only the return of the money will be used to further develop the club and its facilities.

They played in the Norwegian top flight between 1938 and 1970 (Norwegian League did not play between 1940 and 1947 due to World War II), 1972–1975 (4 seasons), 1978–1980 (3 seasons), 1996–1997 (2 seasons). Their recent season in the top division was in the 1999 Tippeligaen.

== Honours ==
- Norwegian top flight:
  - Champions (1): 1966
  - Runners-up (5): 1938–39, 1952–53, 1953–54, 1957–58, 1967
  - Third (1): 1963
- Norwegian Cup:
  - Winners (8): 1947, 1954, 1955, 1956, 1958, 1963, 1965, 1974
  - Runners-up (3): 1939, 1940, 1949

Other honours

- Oslo Championships
  - Winners (2): 1940, 1945
- Norwegian junior championships
  - Winners (4): 1962, 1969, 1998, 1999

1929: Won the regional championships after beating Vålerenga 2–1. The red and blue colors are used for the first time.

== 2020 - ==
Skeid startet the year 2020 with a new head coach, when Gard Holme signed on to lead the squad on 6 January. He took over a team that lost 8 players from the most used starting lineup in 2019, and due to a strict economy Skeid only signed new players from 2. and 3. Division.

The season was put on a hold at the start of the year due to the COVID-19 pandemic, and did not start until July, when it started with a reduced schedule. During the season, Skeid played homegames at 3 different venues due to problematic circumstances regarding the artificial turf at Nordre Åsen.

Nonetheless, Holme led Skeid to a promotion playoff in his first season, which they lost against Asker on penalties after both games ended 1-1.

Skeid lost a couple of key players before the 2021 season when Idar Nordby Lysgård (Mjøndalen), Henning Tønsberg Andresen (Ull/Kisa), Taofeek Ismaheel (Fredrikstad) and Hassan Yusuf (Grorud) all left the team, while legendary player Daniel Braathen hang up his boots after a great career.

The ”new” team started the season strong, and it looked like Skeid would challenge for promotion with Arendal and Egersund as their greatest rivals. Head coach Gard Holme also changed the formation from the previous year and played more of a 3-4-3 / 3-5-2-formation this season.

Top scorer Johnny Buduson got injured midway through the season, and Holme chose to play youngster Abel Stensrud at his spot for the rest of the season. That turned out to be a great choice, as Stensrud scored 19 goals on the last 12 games and ended up top scorer in the division.

In the end of October Skeid clinched promotion back to the OBOS-ligaen (Division 1) after a 12-0-win over Rosenborg 2 in front of over 800 people in the crowd at Nordre Åsen. It had been a tough season with both Egersund and Arendal fighting for promotion, but in the end Skeid ended up on top.

Skeid started the year of 2022 rough as top scorer Abel Stensrud and Simen Hestnes both left the team when their contracts expired, and they signed for Odd and KFUM Oslo shortly after. Head Coach Holme brought in Bendik Rise (Hødd), Morten Renå Olsen (Strømmen) and Sulayman Bojang (FK Haugesund) to the during the winter.

Skeid started the season badly, and halfway through the season Skeid was in 15th place in the table with only Stjørdals-Blink behind them and Grorud a couple of points in front of them. During the summer break Skeid brought in a couple of players on loan: Kristoffer Hoven (Sogndal) and Simen Kvia-Egeskog (Viking) where both loaned in, while Maxwell Effiom (Sandnes Ulf) and Per-Magnus Steiring (Kongsvinger) signed on, Effiom for two years while Steiring signed on for the remainder of the season.

After the summer break, things turned for Skeid, and they got 22 points from the remaining games, and ended the season in 14th place, which meant relegation playoff against Arendal from division 2. Skeid went on to beat Arendal 6–0 at home and 2–1 away to remain in OBOS-ligaen another year.

During the winter break before the 2023 season Skeid again lost a couple of key players when captain Fredrik Berglie departed for Sandefjord while young talent Jakob Napoleon Romsaas departed for Tromsø up north. Skeid brought in Fredrik Flo (Sandefjord) and Torje Naustdal (FK Haugesund) to bolster the squad, while Kristoffer Hoven and Per Magnus Steiring both signed two year deals the 2022 season concluded. Skeid also brought in goalkeeper Simen Vidtun Nilsen on loan from Sarpsborg 08 as the new first choice in goal.

Midway through the season Skeid where at relegation point in the table after 11 points on the first 15 games, and with team still on relegation in August, head coach Gard Holme resigned. His replacement for the remaining of the season was experienced head coach Arne Erlandsen, but he couldn't save the team from relegation. After only a single win and eleven losses on his twelve games in charge, Skeid ended the season rock bottom with only 14 points on 30 games.

In December 2023 Skeid made history when 31 year old Vilde Mollestad Rislaa was announced as new head coach, the first female head coach for the men's first team in the club's 107 year old history.

Rislaa took over a team with several key members of the team departing, but a couple of the players that supporters thought would leave decided to stay after Rislaa talked with the players and told them about her plans for the team and the upcoming season. Throughout pre-season Rislaa focused hard on the defensive culture in the team, and took that focus with here into the season.

Skeid had a strong season and were in the fight for promotion throughout 2024. When autumn came it became clear that the fight would stand between Skeid and Tromsdalen, but Skeid prevailed with three straight wins at the end of the season to secure promotion. Skeid ended with 58 points on 26 games and 53–20 in goal difference, with only 7 goals conceded on away soil.

== Recent history ==
Season		Pos.	Pl.	W	D	L	GS	GA	P	Cup	Notes
2006	2. divisjon	↑ 1	26	20	3	3	67	23	63	Third round	Promoted to the 1. divisjon
2007	1. divisjon	↓ 15	30	4	8	18	32	60	20	Third round	Relegated to the 2. divisjon
2008	2. divisjon	↑ 1	26	22	3	1	88	28	69	Second round	Promoted to the 1. divisjon
2009	1. divisjon	↓ 16	30	4	6	20	26	66	18	First round	Relegated to the 2. divisjon
2010	2. divisjon	3	26	15	5	6	49	28	50	Second round	
2011	2. divisjon	2	26	16	4	6	75	38	52	Second round	
2012	2. divisjon	↓ 12	26	7	5	14	42	55	26	Second round	Relegated to the 3. divisjon
2013	3. divisjon	↑ 1	26	20	3	3	91	17	63	First qualifying round	Promoted to the 2. divisjon
2014	2. divisjon	7	26	13	3	10	54	41	42	First round	
2015	2. divisjon	9	26	8	6	12	45	54	30	Second round	
2016	2. divisjon	3	26	15	7	4	57	29	52	First round	
2017	2. divisjon	5	26	13	5	8	42	27	44	Second round	
2018	2. divisjon	↑ 1	26	17	5	4	59	25	56	Third round	Promoted to the 1. divisjon
2019	1. divisjon	↓ 15	30	4	10	16	38	54	22	Third round	Relegated to the 2. divisjon
2020	2. divisjon	2	19	12	2	5	36	21	38	Cancelled	Lost promotion play-off
2021	2. divisjon	↑ 1	26	17	5	4	63	22	56	Second round	Promoted to the 1. divisjon
2022	1. divisjon	14	30	8	4	18	39	54	28	Third round	
2023	1. divisjon	↓ 16	30	3	5	22	24	62	14	Second round	Relegated to the 2. divisjon
2024	2. divisjon	↑ 1	26	17	7	2	53	20	58	Second round	Promoted to the 1. divisjon
2025	1. divisjon	↓ 16	30	2	9	19	35	66	15	Second round	Relegated to the 2. divisjon

== European record ==
Season	Competition	Round	Country	Club	Home	Away	Aggregate
1964–65	European Cup Winners' Cup	First round	(Finland)	Valkeakosken Haka	1–0	0–2	1–2
1966–67	European Cup Winners' Cup	First round	(Spain)	Real Zaragoza	3–2	1–3	4–5
1967–68	European Cup	First round	(Czech Republic)	Sparta Prague	0–1	1–1	1–2
1968–69	Inter-Cities Fairs Cup	First round	(Sweden)	AIK	1–1	1–2	2–3
1969–70	Inter-Cities Fairs Cup	First round	(Germany)	1860 München	2–1	2–2	4–3
1969–70	Inter-Cities Fairs Cup	Second round	(Romania)	Dinamo Bacău	0–0	0–2	0–2
1975–76	European Cup Winners' Cup	First round	(Poland)	Stal Rzeszów	1–4	0–4	1–8
1979–80	UEFA Cup	First round	(England)	Ipswich Town	1–3	0–7	1–10

== Players ==
=== Current squad ===
As of 12 September 2026

Note: Flags indicate national team as defined under FIFA eligibility rules; some limited exceptions apply. Players may hold more than one non-FIFA nationality.

No.	Pos.	Nation	Player
1	GK	DEN	Mikkel Makrdal
2	DF	NOR	Lucas Svenningsen (on loan from Lillestrøm)
3	DF	NOR	Samuel Ekroll
4	DF	IRQ	Hayder Altai
5	DF	NOR	Keivan Ghaedamini
6	MF	NOR	Adnan Hadzic
8	MF	NOR	Filip Stensland
9	FW	NOR	Kara Bandeh
10	MF	NOR	Mikkel Lindbäck
11	DF	GAM	Sulayman Bojang
12	GK	NOR	Aleksander Nesbakken
14	DF	SEN	Boubacar Sadio Ba

No.	Pos.	Nation	Player
15	FW	NOR	Musa Joof Dubois
16	FW	NOR	Kristoffer Ødemarksbakken
17	MF	NOR	Jarmund Kvernstuen
18	FW	SEN	Amadou Moustapha Badiane
19	MF	NOR	Tobias Myhre
22	DF	NOR	Sigurd Ekornes
23	DF	NOR	Akinsola Akinyemi
24	GK	NOR	Jonas Elverum Abrahamsen
26	DF	NOR	Mohammed Abbas
77	FW	NOR	Filip Delaveris
99	FW	NOR	David Bakkane

For season transfers, see List of Norwegian football transfers winter 2024–25, and List of Norwegian football transfers summer 2025.

=== Out on loan ===
Note: Flags indicate national team as defined under FIFA eligibility rules; some limited exceptions apply. Players may hold more than one non-FIFA nationality.

No.	Pos.	Nation	Player
26	MF	NOR	Dino Sarotic (on loan at Kvik Halden until 31 December 2026)
-	MF	NOR	Almas Ayman Samrat (on loan at Kvik Halden until 31 December 2026)
