= Eljero Elia =

Dutch footballer (born 1987)

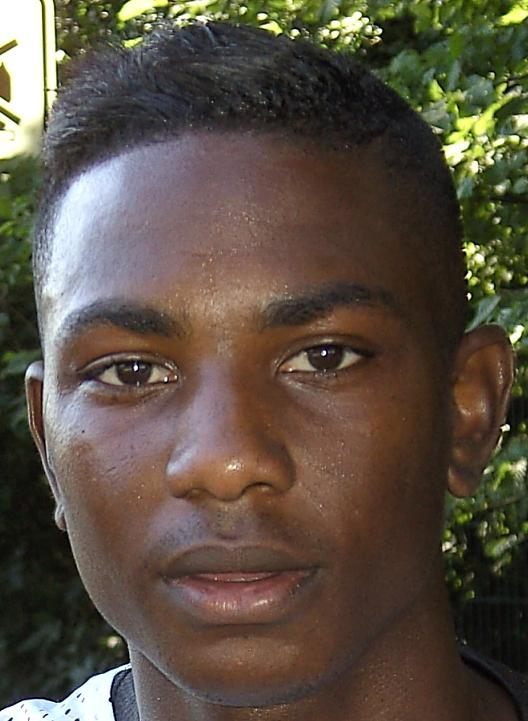
- Elia in 2012

Personal information
- Full name: Eljero George Rinaldo Elia
- Date of birth: 13 February 1987 (age 39)
- Place of birth: Voorburg, Netherlands
- Height: 1.76 m (5 ft 9 in)
- Position: Winger

Youth career
- SV Voorburg
- TONEGIDO
- 1996–2000: ADO Den Haag
- 2000–2002: Ajax
- 2002–2004: ADO Den Haag

Senior career*
| Years | Team | Apps | (Gls) |
| 2004–2007 | ADO Den Haag | 59 | (6) |
| 2007–2009 | Twente | 64 | (11) |
| 2009–2011 | Hamburger SV | 52 | (7) |
| 2011–2012 | Juventus | 4 | (0) |
| 2012–2015 | Werder Bremen | 66 | (4) |
| 2015 | → Southampton (loan) | 16 | (2) |
| 2015–2017 | Feyenoord | 55 | (17) |
| 2017–2020 | İstanbul Başakşehir | 68 | (9) |
| 2020–2021 | Utrecht | 20 | (2) |
| 2021–2022 | ADO Den Haag | 9 | (0) |
| Total | | 413 | (58) |

International career
| 2006–2008 | Netherlands U21 | 7 | (1) |
| 2008 | Netherlands B | 1 | (0) |
| 2009–2018 | Netherlands | 30 | (2) |
Medal record
Representing Netherlands
Men's football
FIFA World Cup
| Runner-up | 2010 | Team |
- * Club domestic league appearances and goals

Eljero George Rinaldo Elia (born 13 February 1987) is a Dutch former professional footballer who played as a winger.

He turned professional at ADO Den Haag and then played for Twente before moving abroad to represent Hamburger SV, Juventus and Werder Bremen. In 2015, he came back to his home country to play for Feyenoord before moving to İstanbul Başakşehir in 2017. After three seasons in Turkey he returned to the Netherlands to play a season at Utrecht and another at his boyhood club ADO Den Haag, where he retired in 2022.

Elia scored on his debut for Netherlands in September 2009 and was part of the Netherlands squad which reached the final of the 2010 FIFA World Cup in South Africa.

== Club career ==
=== Early career ===
Born in Voorburg, Elia played as a youth for local side SV Voorburg, before it merged to become Forum Sport in 1998. He later moved to cross-city rivals TONEGIDO and played in their youth department. In 1996, at age nine, Elia moved to the youth system of ADO Den Haag. He then moved to Ajax in 2000. Elia reflected on his time at the club, saying: "Already as a kid I loved playing for that club. Walking across the street wearing a big Ajax bag, I thought that was great. That Amsterdam bluff also suits me, I think. Challenging, fooling around, just like on the streets. Making an opponent crazy, that's the best thing there is." At under-13 level, he was sent away: "Together with Nordin Amrabat and Jeremain Lens. They thought I wasn't making a difference often enough. No, I never actually played as a winger for Ajax. Usually I was right mid, sometimes right back and sometimes central in the defence. Henny de Regt told me at the time that I was not allowed to stay. I felt so awful." He then rejoined the youth system of ADO Den Haag two years later. Then youth coach Carlos Roeleveld said: "I soon saw that he was special. But I also got a disappointed boy with whom I had to work. That was in the under-15. He was disappointed because he had been sent away from Ajax. He was thinking a lot."

=== ADO Den Haag ===
Elia made his professional debut for ADO Den Haag on 23 January 2005 against FC Groningen at age 17, coming on as 81st-minute substitute in a 3–0 loss. In his fourth appearance for ADO Den Haag, he scored his first goal in a match against AZ on 8 May, which turned out to be the winning goal, in a 2–1 win. In his first season at the club, Elia played four matches and scored one goal. In his second season at ADO Den Haag, Elia soon established himself in the starting line-up, playing in midfield. He scored his first goal of the 2005–06 season in a 2–2 draw against Ajax on 21 September. By the end of the 2005–06 season, he had made 30 appearances and scored 2 goals in all competitions.

Elia continued to establish himself in the team in the 2006–07 season, playing in midfield. He scored his first goal of the season on 28 October 2006 in a 2–0 win against Heracles Almelo. He scored two goals in two matches between 16 and 23 December 2006 against Willem II and NAC Breda. Along the way, Elia was dealing with injuries throughout the 2006–07 season. He finished the 2006–07 season with 37 appearances and 3 goals in all competitions. However, ADO Den Haag's relegation, along with his some conflicts new coach Lex Schoenmaker and his lack of desire to want to play in the Eerste Divisie, contributed to Elia leaving the club at the end of the 2006–07 season.

=== Twente ===
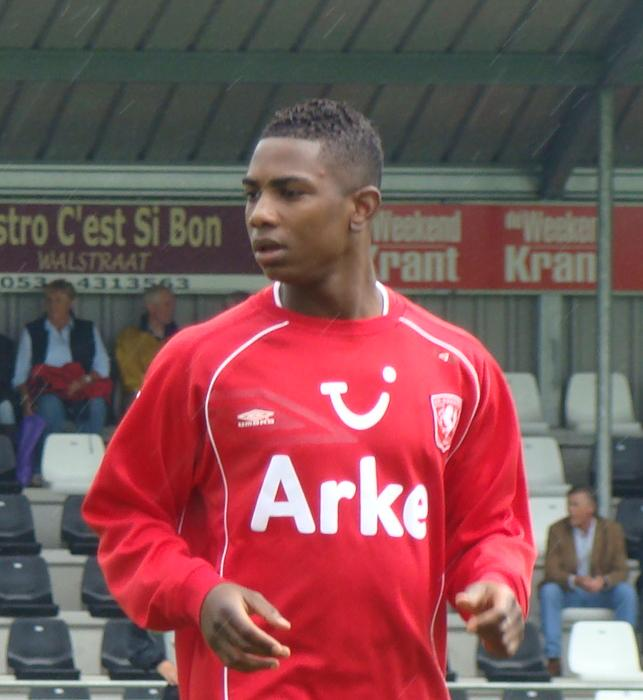
Elia training with Twente in 2008

Following the end of the 2006–07 season, Elia was linked with a move to either Twente and Ajax, as they were interested in signing him. It was reported that Ajax's interest in signing the player was to immediately loan him out to ADO Den Haag for the 2007–08 season. But he opted to agree to join FC Twente. The move was confirmed the next day on 29 May 2007, with Elia signing a three-year contract with the club.

He made his debut for Twente, coming on as a 72nd-minute substitute, in a 2–2 draw against FC Utrecht on 26 August 2007. Since joining the club, Elia became involved in the first team, having found his playing time, coming from the substitute bench before he soon won his place in the starting eleven. It wasn't until on 8 February 2008 when Elia scored his first goal for FC Twente in a 2–1 win over Heracles Almelo on 8 February 2008. A month later on 23 March 2008, he scored his second goal for the club, in a 2–1 win over Ajax. Elia played all four matches in the league's play–off for the UEFA Champions League spot and helped FC Twente earn a place in the tournament after beating Ajax 2–1 on aggregate. In his first season at the club, Elia made 36 appearances and scored twice in all competitions.

At the start of the 2008–09 season, Elia made his UEFA Champions League debut in the third qualifying round of the Champions League against English club Arsenal in the first leg, as FC Twente lost 2–0. In the return leg, the club were eliminated from the tournament after they lost 4–0, losing 6–0 on aggregate. He then scored three goals in the first three league matches of the season against Roda JC, NEC Nijmegen and FC Volendam. This was followed up by scoring twice, in a 5–0 win against FC Emmen in the second round of the KNVB Cup. Since the start of the 2008–09 season, Elia improved under the new management of Steve McClaren, and continued to be a first team regular, playing in the midfield position. Despite the club's elimination from the tournament, he played in both legs of the first round of the UEFA Cup against Stade Rennais and set up goal in the first leg, which proved to be vital, as FC Twente won 1–0 through away goal to advance to the UEFA Cup's group stage. His performance led the club began open talks with Elia over a new contract. He then scored four more goals by the end of the year, including his first European goal in a 3–2 loss a to Manchester City on 6 November 2008.

In the January transfer window, Arsenal, Ajax and PSV Eindhoven were linked with a move to sign Elia after his break-out season for Twente. Ajax had their bid rejected twice by the club in their efforts to sign the player. It was reported on 15 January 2009 that he ended the transfer speculation by signing a five-year contract extension with FC Twente, keeping him until 2013. Following this, Elia scored his tenth goal of the season, in a 4–1 win against NAC Breda on 4 February 2009. He later added three more goals in the league, coming against FC Groningen, Roda JC and AZ Alkmaar. In the Dutch Cup, the club progressed to the final against Heerenveen, where Elia scored the opener, which would not be enough as Twente lost on penalties after Youssouf Hersi missed the decisive kick. Despite missing three matches during the 2008–09 season, he went on to make forty–seven appearances and scoring fourteen appearances in all competitions. For his performance, Elia was named the Dutch Football Talent of the Year for 2009, adding to his burgeoning reputation as an emerging talent in Europe and Voetbal International's Team of the Season.

However, two months after signing a new contract, Elia announced his intention to leave the club at the end of the 2008–09 season. He said about leaving FC Twente: "It will be a club that suits me again. A club where I can grow again, as I have grown here." Among interested were PSV, Schalke 04, Hamburger SV and Bayern Munich.

=== Hamburger SV ===
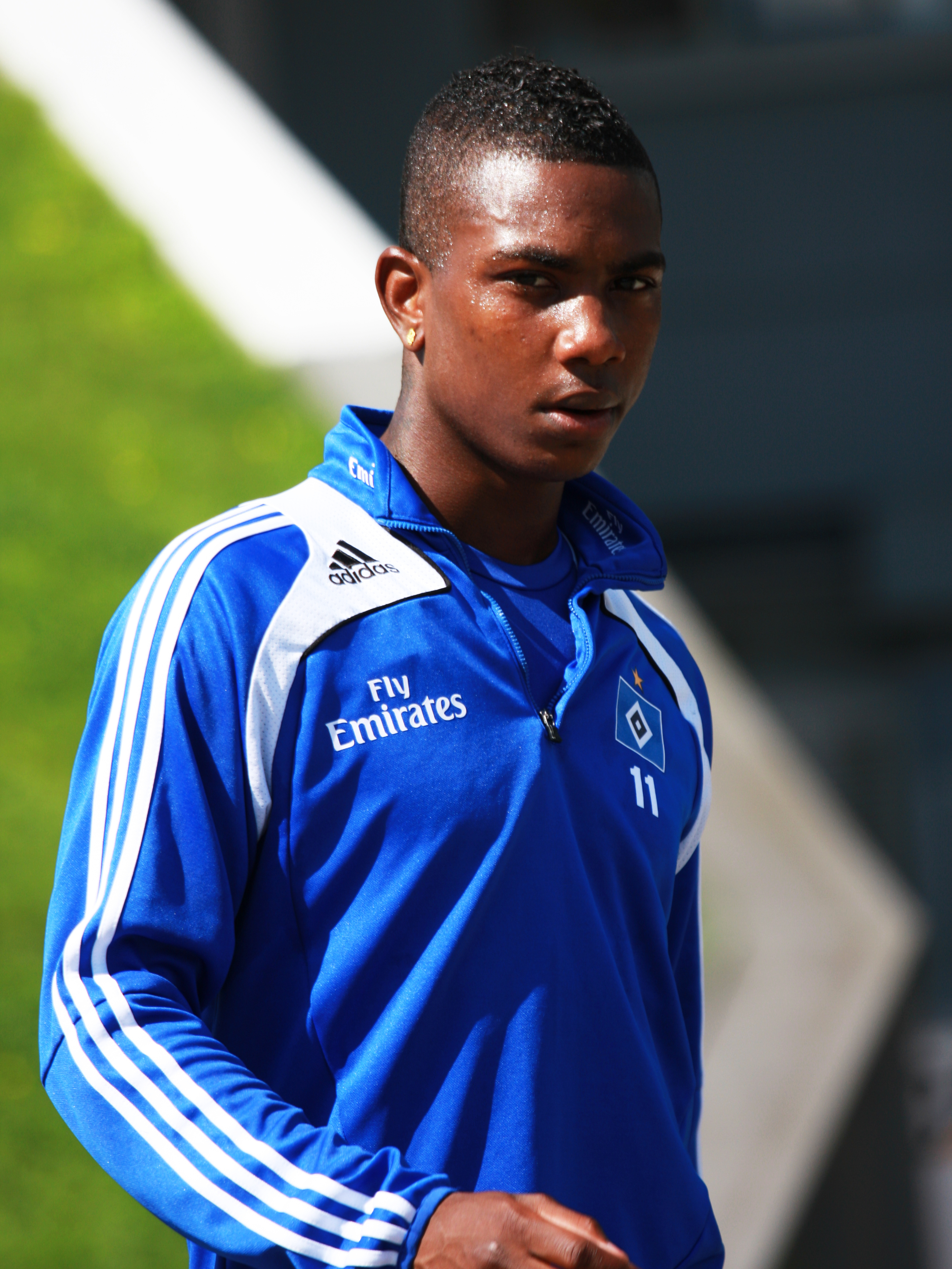
Elia training with Hamburger SV in 2009

On 5 July 2009, Elia joined Bundesliga club Hamburger SV on a five-year contract, for a transfer fee of €8.5 million. Upon joining the club, he said: "I am very happy that there is now clarity. HSV is a wonderful club and is part of the top of Germany. I hope that I can take another step in my development at HSV and that I will succeed in staying with the selection of the Dutch national team towards the World Cup. South Africa is my dream." However, Elia suffered a setback when he suffered a patella problems while training and was sidelined for a week. But Elia recovered and made his debut for the club, coming on as a 69th-minute substitute, in the first match of the season against SC Freiburg, in a 1–1 draw. In a follow–up match against Borussia Dortmund, he set up a goal during a 4–1 win. Seven days later on 23 August 2009, Elia scored his first goal for Hamburger SV, in a 4–2 win over VfL Wolfsburg. He helped the club beat Guingamp 8–2 on aggregate in the UEFA Europa League's play–offs round to reach the group stage and contributed with an assist in the first leg.

Since joining Hamburger SV, Elia quickly established himself in the first team, where he rotated in playing either the midfield or striker positions. But Elia found his role unsatisfying to play under the management of manager Labbadia. Three weeks later on 12 September 2009, Elia scored his second goal for the club, and set up another, in a 3–1 win against Stuttgart. He then scored his first Europa League goal in a 4–2 win over Hapoel Tel Aviv on 1 October 2009. A month later on 8 November 2009, Elia scored his fourth goal of the season and set up the opening goal of the game, in a 2–2 draw against Hannover 96. However, he suffered an ankle injury in the 15th minute and was substituted as a result, as Hamburger SV drew 1–1 draw at Mainz 05 on 28 November 2009. After missing one match, Elia returned to the first team from injury against 1899 Hoffenheim on 5 December 2009, coming on as a 61st-minute substitute, as the club drew 0–0. In a follow–up match against 1. FC Nürnberg, he scored twice and set up a goal, in a 4–0 win (one of the goals was named Bundesliga Goal of the Month).

However, Elia suffered another ankle injury that saw him miss two matches. He made his return to the first team from injury against Bayern Munich on 28 February 2010 and started the whole game, as Hamburger SV lost 1–0. However, his return was short–lived when Elia suffered ankle injury once again and was sidelined for four weeks following surgery, which manager Labbadia described as a "bitter blow". But he made his return in the last game of the season against Werder Bremen, coming on in the 73rd minute as the club drew 1–1. Despite missing sidelined with minor setbacks during the 2009–10 season, Elia made 35 appearances and scoring five times in all competitions.

Ahead of the 2010–11 season, Elia was linked with several clubs such as Juventus, Bayern Munich and Valencia. But he knew nothing about a move and wanted to stay at Hamburg for another season despite expressing his desire to play in the UEFA Champions League. Elia started the season well when he set up the opening goal of the game for Ruud van Nistelrooy, who went on to score twice in the match, in a 2–1 win against Schalke 04. In his second season at the club, Elia was rotated in and out of the starting line–up and played less frequently, due to being on the substitute bench. However, he suffered a heel bone injury while on international duty and was sidelined for a month. Although Elia made a recovery, his return was delayed for the rest of November when he suffered a flu that saw him miss one match. Elia made his return from a two-month absence, coming on as a 71st-minute substitute, in a 1–0 loss against SC Freiburg on 4 December 2010. This was followed up by scoring two goals in the next two matches against Bayer Leverkusen and Borussia Mönchengladbach between 11 December 2010 and 18 December 2010.

His performance continued to attract interest from European clubs in the January transfer window, but he ended up staying at Hamburger SV. Following the end of the January transfer window, he spoke about his struggles in the first team, with only nine starts made so far this season and was considering leaving the club if he did not regain his starting position. However, Elia was absent for the next three matches after being dropped from the squad by manager Armin Veh. But he made his return to the starting line–up against Bayern Munich on 12 March 2011, as Hamburger SV lost 6–0. In a follow–up match against 1. FC Köln, Elia played a role in the match when he set up two goals, in a 6–2 win. However, further conflict between Elia and Hamburger SV's management when he felt no longer respected. At the end of the 2010–11 season, he went on to make twenty–five appearances and scoring two times in all competitions.

Ahead of the 2011–12 season, Elia continued to be linked a move away from Hamburger SV and was expected to leave the club. But he announced his intention to stay at Hamburger SV. Amid the transfer speculation, Elia made five appearances for the club. Towards the end of the summer transfer window, there was a tug of war over the player when Arsenal and Juventus wanted to sign him. It was reported on 29 August 2011 that he agreed to sign for Juventus.

=== Juventus ===
On 31 August 2011, Juventus confirmed the signing of Elia from Hamburg on a four-year contract for a fee of €9 million.

He made his debut for the club, starting the match and played 45 minutes before being substituted at half time, in a 1–1 draw against Catania on 25 September 2011. In a match against Bologna in the last 16 of the Coppa Italia, Elia set up a winning goal for Claudio Marchisio, who scored the second goal of the game, in a 2–1 win to help Juventus advance to the next round. However, he found it hard to make an impact in the black and white shirt, due to the competitions in the midfield position. Elia later made three more appearances for the club later in the 2011–12 season, as they ended up winning the Serie A title without losing a game. Following this, he announced his intention to leave Juventus in order to revive his career elsewhere. The following month, on 11 June 2012, Elia handed in a transfer request which was granted by Juventus.

=== Werder Bremen ===
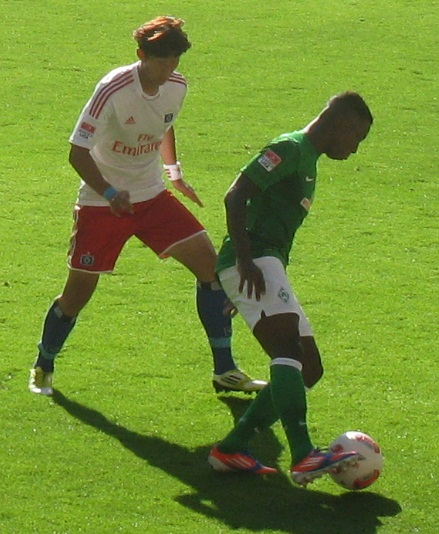
Elia (right) playing for Werder Bremen in 2012

On 9 July 2012, Werder Bremen confirmed the signing of Elia from Juventus on a four-year contract for a fee of €5.5 million. Upon joining the club, he said: "I know all about this league, which is one of the best in the world with its full stadia and a very strong competition at a high level. I would like to make a quick impression here and recommend myself for a return to the national team with my performances for Werder Bremen.".

Elia made his debut for the club in the first round of the DFB–Pokal against Preußen Münster and scored his first Werder Bremen goal before suffering a foot injury and was substituted in the 59th minute, which saw them lose 3–2. But he quickly recovered and returned to the starting line–up, in a 2–1 loss in the opening game of the season against Borussia Dortmund. Since joining the club, Elia quickly established himself in the first team, playing in the left–wing position. However, having made seven league appearances with no goals so far, he found it difficult to adapt to the club's playing style, but was willing to wait for his patient to score his first goal in the league for Werder Bremen. However, Elia received criticism for his performance by the club's supporters and local newspaper Weser Kurier. As a result, he was demoted to the substitute bench and found his playing time coming from the substitute bench. In April 2013, Elia and his Werder Bremen teammate Marko Arnautović were caught speeding and were both suspended by the club. Following this, he issued an apology to Werder Bremen supporters for his action. Despite being injury plagued throughout the 2012–13 season, Elia went on to make twenty–five appearances and scoring once in all competitions.

Ahead of the 2013–14 season, Elia returned to the first team from suspension and was featured in Werder Bremen's pre–season tour. Amid to the start of the season, he was linked a move away from the club, as clubs, such as, Liverpool, CSKA Moscow and Ajax were interested in signing him, but the player ended up staying at Werder Bremen. Elia made his first appearance for the club since being suspended in the opening game of the season against Eintracht Braunschweig and started the whole game to help Werder Bremen win 1–0. Since then, he continued to establish himself in the first team, playing in the midfield position or striker position. Elia also earned redemption from the club's supporters, who didn't want him in the first team. It wasn't until on 30 September 2013 when he scored his first goals for Werder Bremen, in a 3–3 draw against 1. FC Nürnberg on 29 September 2013. Elia then scored two goals in two matches between 24 November 2013 and 30 November 2013, coming against 1. FSV Mainz 05 and 1899 Hoffenheim respectively. Since the start of the 2013–14 season, he appeared in every match until missing one match due to being on the substitute bench against 1.FC Nuremberg on 8 March 2014, having previously been placed on the substitute bench in recent matches. After missing one match, Elia returned to the first team against Stuttgart on 15 March 2014, coming on as a 73rd-minute substitute, in a 1–1 draw. He then continued to be involved in the first team for the rest of the 2013–14 season. Elia then played a contribution for the club when he set up two goals in two matches between 30 March 2014 and 5 April 2014, coming against Hannover 96 and Schalke 04 respectively. Despite missing suffering injuries on two occasions throughout the 2013–14 season, Elia went on to make thirty–three appearances and scoring four times in all competitions. The 2013–14 season was an improvement for the player, as his performance convinced Werder Bremen decided against selling him.

In the opening game of the 2014–15 season, Elia made a good start when he provided an assist for Franco Di Santo in a 2–2 draw against Hertha BSC. Elia then appeared in a number of matches in the first team, playing in the left–wing position. However, he was dropped from the squad for two matches after his poor performance in Werder Bremen's match, in a lost 6–0 against Bayern Munich on 18 October 2014. But Elia made his return to the starting line–up against Stuttgart on 8 November 2014 and played 56 minutes before being substituted, in a 2–0 win. However, his return to the first team was short–lived when manager Viktor Skrypnyk decided to drop the player from the first team matchday squad the following month. Halfway through the 2014–15 season, he was sidelined on three occasions, due to injuries. By the time Elia left the club in the January transfer window, he made ten appearances in all competitions. Elia was later critical of Werder Bremen's management.

Upon returning to his parent club from Southampton in the summer of 2015, Elia said he doesn't want to return to Werder Bremen on the following season. As a result, the Die Grün-Weißen exempted Elia from regular first-team training to find a new club and also considered placing him into the club's reserve. While waiting for the offer, he trained with Werder Bremen for the rest of July.

==== Southampton (loan) ====
Having hinted about leaving Werder Bremen in the January transfer window, Southampton announced on 23 December 2014, that Elia would join them on loan from 3 January 2015 for the remainder of the season, with an option to make the loan permanent at the end of the season. Upon joining the club, he said: "It's a dream that I can play at Southampton. The club wanted me and the coach has played an important role in that. I have only heard good stories about Ronald Koeman and I hope he can show me the way to new success."

On 11 January 2015, Elia made his Premier League debut for Southampton in a 1–0 win away to Manchester United at Old Trafford; he was replaced by substitute Dušan Tadić after 63 minutes, who went on to score the winning goal. Elia scored his first Premier League goals with a brace in a 2–1 victory at Newcastle United on 17 January. Since joining the club, he was involved in a number of first team matches for the rest of the season. Despite missing one match through injury, Elia went on to make seventeen appearances and scoring two times in all competitions. Following this, he was keen to stay at the club permanently. It came after when Werder Bremen's chief director claimed Southampton wanted to sign him permanently. Elia, himself, said he was keen to join the club permanently. However, Southampton opted against signing a permanent deal for the player, as the clause reportedly cost €5.5m (about £4m), which "has been seen as too expensive" for the club. Despite this, Southampton was still keen to sign Elia.

=== Feyenoord ===
"I think Elia covers twenty meters in a second, so I need more help. Once he gets going, he's unstoppable. You can bring him down, but at some point, you've got enough cards and can't do that anymore. As soon as he starts coming after you, it gets difficult. The fact is, he's fast, and there's nothing I can do about that."

— Bram van Polen commends Elia for his performance in the 2–0 loss of PEC Zwolle against Feyenoord on 27 September 2015.

On 6 August 2015, Elia signed a two-year deal with Dutch side Feyenoord under the management of former Arsenal player Giovanni van Bronckhorst instead of joining Southampton. Upon joining the club, he said: "I do have a click with Rotterdam, the mentality of the people appeals to me. I also have many Rotterdam friends, who are all for Feyenoord. I think that a lot is possible at Feyenoord. The team has a lot of quality, there is a lot of potential. I want to be an example for the young boys, support them and also give extra impulses to the team."

Elia made his debut for the club, coming on as a 68th-minute substitute, in a 3–1 loss to rivals PSV on 30 August 2015. In a follow–up match, he scored his first goal for Feyenoord, in a 1–0 win against Willem II. Elia then played in Jong Feyenoord against Jong SC Cambuur on 14 September 2015 but he was sent–off in the 36th minute for hitting an opponent, as the Jong side drew 1–1. After the match, it was announced that KNVB would not take against the player because of "insufficient evidence". Following this, Elia scored two goals in two matches between 27 September 2015 and 4 October 2015 against PEC Zwolle and De Graafschap respectively. Since joining the club, he quickly established himself in the first team for the Rotterdam-based outfit, playing in the left–wing position. It wasn't until on 6 March 2016 when Elia scored his fourth goal of the season, in a 3–0 win against Heracles Almelo. His fifth goal of the season came on 6 March 2016, in a 3–1 win against SC Cambuur. Two weeks later on 19 March 2016, he scored his sixth goal of the season, in a 3–1 win against De Graafschap, which was followed up by scoring in a 3–0 win against Excelsior. Two weeks later on 20 April 2016, Elia scored his eighth goal of the season, in a 2–2 draw against Heracles Almelo. Four days later on 24 April 2016, he started in the KNVB Cup Final against FC Utrecht and played a role that led to a winning goal, as Feyenoord won the KNVB Cup, the club's 12th title. Elia then helped Feyenoord finish third place in the league after beating Willem II 1–0 on 1 May 2016. Despite struggling with a groin injuries on two occasions throughout the 2015–16 season, he went on to make thirty–seven appearances and scoring eight times in all competitions.

Ahead of the 2016–17 season, Elia signed a one–year contract extension with Feyenoord, keeping him until 2018. He started on the left wing as the team lost 1–0 to PSV in the Johan Cruyff Shield. In the opening game of the 2016–17 season, Elia scored a hat–trick in a 5–0 win against FC Groningen. However, Elia suffered a shoulder injury while training and was out for two months. It wasn't until on 23 October 2016 when he returned to the first team, coming on as a 60th-minute substitute against rivals, Ajax and set up the equalising goal, in a 1–1 draw. Three days later on 26 October 2016, Elia scored his fourth goal of the season, in a 4–0 win against SBV Excelsior in the second round of the KNVB Cup. Since returning from injury, he regained his first team place, playing in the left–wing position. Elia then scored his fifth goal of the season, in a 6–1 win against Sparta Rotterdam on 4 December 2016. Following this, he played a key role for Feyenoord by assisting five times and scoring three times, coming against Vitesse, Roda JC and NEC Nijmegen, all of them were wins to help the club maintain their place at the top of the table. During which, Elia suffered a hamstring injury while training but he quickly recovered. After suffering minor injuries, Elia suffered a foot injury that saw him miss two matches. It wasn't until on 5 April 2017 when he made his return to the first team from injury and scored his ninth goal of the season, in an 8–0 win against Go Ahead Eagles to bounce back from the previous defeat against Ajax. Following this, it was revealed that Elia had his knee injected in effort to avoid having further injury. Two weeks later on 16 April 2017, he scored his tenth goal of the season, in a 2–0 win against Utrecht to help the club maintain their lead at the top of the table. In the last game of the season against Heracles Almelo, Elia played a role in the match when he set up a goal for Dirk Kuyt, who went on to score a hat–trick, in a 3–1 win, a result that saw Feyenoord win the Eredivisie title of 2016–17 season. At the end of the 2016–17 season, Elia went on to make thirty–one appearances and scoring ten times in all competitions.

Following this, Elia announced his intention of leaving Feyenoord, citing to play abroad. He was linked with a move to Fenerbahçe and İstanbul Başakşehir. During his time at Feyenoord, Elia was among a fan favourite among the club's supporters, who chanted 'Oe-Ah-Elia'.

=== İstanbul Başakşehir ===
On 13 June 2017, Elia joined Turkish side İstanbul Başakşehir on a three-year contract.

He made his debut for the club on 26 July 2017 in a 3–3 away draw against Club Brugge in the first leg of the third qualifying round of the UEFA Champions League, immediately scoring his first goal in the 62nd minute of the match. In the return leg, Elia started in the match and helped İstanbul Başakşehir win 2–0 to advance to the next round. His first appearance in the Süper Lig came on 11 August 2017 in a 1–0 home win over Bursaspor, where he scored the only goal of the match. Elia scored in both legs of the UEFA Champions League's play–offs round against Sevilla, as the club were eliminated following a 4–3 loss on aggregate. Since joining İstanbul Başakşehir, he quickly established himself in the first team, playing in the left–wing position. However, Elia suffered a shoulder injury and had an operation that saw him out for two months. It wasn't until on 18 February 2018 when he made his return from injury, coming on as a 74th-minute substitute, in a 1–0 win against Trabzonspor. Elia then scored three goals in three matches between 18 March 2018 and 6 April 2018 against Beşiktaş, Alanyaspor and Yeni Malatyaspor. Two weeks later on 20 April 2018, he scored his eighth goal of the season, in a 3–1 win against Kayserispor. Elia followed up by assisting three times in the next three matches. Having helped the club finish third place in the league, he went on to make thirty–two appearances and scoring eight times in all competitions.

Ahead of the 2018–19 season, Elia was linked a move away from with İstanbul Başakşehir, with European clubs were interested in signing him, but he ended up staying at the club. However, he found himself plagued with injuries and affected his playing time for the 2018–19 season. Despite this, Elia scored his only goal of the season, in a 1–1 draw against Kasımpaşa on 28 January 2019. Despite aiming to help İstanbul Başakşehir win the league for the first time, the club ended up finishing second place after surrendering their title chances to Galatasaray, in a 2–1 loss on 19 May 2019. At the end of the 2018–19 season, he went on to make twenty–four appearances and scoring once in all competitions.

Ahead of the 2019–20 season, Elia was linked with a move to Beşiktaş, but he ended up staying at İstanbul Başakşehir. However, Elia suffered an injury in the 23rd minute against Fenerbahçe on 24 August 2019, as the club lost 2–0; which subsequently saw the player missed two matches. But he made his return from injury, coming on as a 70th-minute substitute and setting up the fourth goal of the game, in a 5–0 win against Çaykur Rizespor on 27 September 2019. Elia then scored his first goal of the season, in a 5–1 win against Kasımpaşa on 28 December 2019. Following his return from injury, he continued to remain involved in the first team and this lasted until the season was disrupted by the COVID-19 pandemic that pushed the season to June; the player made twenty–four appearances and scoring once so far. Once the season resumed behind closed doors, Elia scored on his first appearances for İstanbul Başakşehir in three months, at the last minutes of the game, in a 2–0 win against Antalyaspor on 4 July 2020. A week later on 13 July 2020, he scored his third goal of the season, in a 4–3 loss against Konyaspor. In a follow–up match against Kayserispor, Elia helped the club win 1–0 to help İstanbul Başakşehir win the Süper Lig for the first time, a target he finally achieved. At the end of the 2019–20 season, Elia went on to make thirty appearances and scoring three times in all competitions.

It was announced on 20 March 2020 that Elia would be leaving İstanbul Başakşehir at the end of the 2019–20 season. His contract with the club expired after the season was confirmed on 19 August 2020, making him a free agent.

=== FC Utrecht ===
On 19 August 2020, Elia signed a two-year contract with Utrecht, after coming over from İstanbul Başakşehir on a free transfer. He was previously linked with a move to clubs in Italy and Argentina before deciding to return to his homeland. Upon joining the club, Elia said: "It is really a lie, Utrecht has already gone very far for me. I received a very nice proposal and I am very happy with it. I wanted to return to the Netherlands and they have a very nice plan, express ambition. That fits with me. Every player wants to play at such a club. You can also see that in the transfers. Utrecht is continuously improving itself."

Elia made his first appearance for FC Utrecht, coming on as a substitute in the 81st minute, in a 1–1 away draw in the Eredivisie against VVV-Venlo on 18 September 2020. Since joining FC Utrecht, Elia found himself in and out of the starting line–up, as he maintain his fitness to earn a place. However, Elia received criticism for not living up to expectation since joining the club. It wasn't until on 22 December 2020 when he scored his first goal for Utrecht in the away match against Emmen, as the club won 3–2. In the next league game on 27 December 2020, Elia again scored the opening goal, this time against AZ. On 11 January 2021, the club announced that Elia had suffered a hamstring injury and as a result would be sidelined the following weeks. Eventually, his return was delayed up to April despite returning to training months earlier. It wasn't until on 11 April 2021 when he made his return to the starting line–up against Feyenoord, coming on as a 76th-minute substitute, in a 2–1 loss. Following this, Elia soon had a first run ins for FC Utrecht's remaining matches of the 2020–21 season. At the end of the 2020–21 season, he went on to make twenty–three appearances and scoring two times in all competitions.

On 30 July 2021, ahead of the 2021–22 season, Elia's contract was terminated by mutual agreement, making him a free agent.

=== Return to ADO Den Haag ===
Elia began practising with his former club ADO Den Haag during the autumn of 2021, who were competing in the second-tier Eerste Divisie. On 18 November 2021, he signed a contract with the club until the end of the season. In late January 2022, he suffered a ligament tear in his ankle that required surgery and prevented him from playing for the rest of the season. Elia officially announced his retirement from playing in late 2022.

== International career ==
=== Youth career ===
In March 2005, Elia was called up to the Netherlands national under-19 team, making his debut for the U19 national team, starting the whole game, in a 2–2 draw against Austria U19. He scored his first goals for the Netherlands U19, in a 2–0 win against Czech Republic U19 on 14 May 2005. Elia then scored his third goal for the U19 national team, in a 1–0 win against Iceland U19 on 2 September 2005. A month later on 19 October 2005, he scored twice for Netherlands U19, in a 2–2 draw against Germany U19. Elia went on to make ten appearances and scoring six times for the U19 national team.

Elia developed rapidly and at the beginning of 2006, he was selected for Netherlands U21 the first time. Elia made his debut for the U21 national team, coming on as a 69th-minute substitute and scored from a penalty, in a 2–2 draw against Germany U21 on 15 August 2006. He later made two more appearances for Netherlands U21 by the end of the year. It wasn't until on 10 August 2007 when Elia was called up to the U21 national team and made an appearance, coming on as a 67th-minute substitute, in a 1–0 win against Macedonia U21 twelve days later. He went on to make seven appearances and scoring two times for Netherlands U21.

On 7 February 2007, Elia made his debut for Netherlands U20, coming on as a second-half substitute, in a 3–1 loss against Denmark U20. A month later on 23 March 2007, he scored his first goals for the U20 national team, in a 3–2 win against Ukraine U20. Elia went on to make five appearances and scoring two times for Netherlands U20. Later in the year, he made one appearances for Netherlands B|, coming against Sweden U21 on 19 November 2008, losing 3–0.

=== Senior career ===
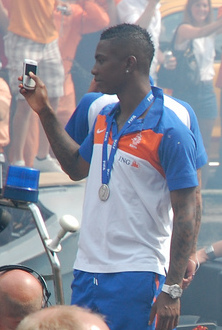
Elia with the Netherlands national team following the end of the 2010 FIFA World Cup

In May 2009, Elia was included in the Netherlands' senior squad for the friendly matches against Iceland and Norway by coach Bert van Marwijk. However, he was dropped from the squad. Once again, Elia was selected for the senior team's friendly with England. However, he was dropped from the squad once again.

On 6 September 2009, Elia made his debut for the Netherlands against Japan in a friendly match, coming on at half-time to replace Arjen Robben, and went on to set up two goals in a 3–0 win. In his second match, on 9 September 2009, Elia scored the only goal to win a match against Scotland. He made his first start for the senior team, in a 0–0 draw against Australia on 10 October 2009. Elia followed up by making three straight starts in the next three matches. He scored his second international goal in a 6–1 friendly win over Hungary with a solo effort after coming on as a substitute.

In May 2010, Elia was included in the preliminary squad for the FIFA World Cup in South Africa despite facing uncertainties over his injury that he sustained while at Hamburger SV. On 27 May 2010, Dutch manager Bert van Marwijk announced that Elia would be part of the 23-man final squad for the 2010 FIFA World Cup. Prior to the tournament, Elia caused controversy in the Dutch media when he tweeted "cancer Moroccan", prompting a ban of use of Twitter. This led Elia making an apology for his action. In the first match, he came on as a substitute in the 72nd minute and set up their second goal in a 2–0 win over Denmark, with his shot hitting the post and Dirk Kuyt tapping it in. Following this, Elia found his playing time, coming from the substitute throughout the tournament. He later said about the role, saying: "If I come in for five or ten minutes, then I do my very best and I want to show my good side. It's nice to fill in, because the boys also help you well." In the final, Elia was a 71st-minute substitute for Kuyt, as Netherlands finished runners-up to Spain.

Following the tournament, Elia was called up to the Netherlands squad in August. He made his first start of the year for the senior national team against San Marino on 3 September 2010 and played 59 minutes before being substituted, in a 5–0 win. It wasn't until on 26 January 2011 when Elia was called up to the Netherlands squad for the first time in four months. He made his first appearance in five months, coming on as a second-half substitute, in a 3–1 win against Austria on 9 February 2011. Following this, Elia found his playing time, coming from the substitute and he helped the senior national team qualify for the UEFA Euro 2012 after beating Finland 2–0 on 6 September 2011.

After a year absence from the national team, Elia was called up to the Netherlands squad on 13 October 2012. Three days later on 16 October 2012, he made his first appearance for the national team in over a year, coming on as a late substitute, in a 4–1 win against Romania. Elia made another appearance for Netherlands in a follow–up match against Germany, coming on as a second-half substitute, in a 0–0 draw. After a three years absence, he was called up to the national team for the first time in three years, but did not play. In May 2018, Elia was called up to the Netherlands for the first time in almost two years. He made his first appearance for the senior team for the first time in almost six years, coming on as a 75th-minute substitute, in a 1–1 draw against Slovakia on 31 May 2018. Elia made another appearance for Netherlands, coming on as an 82nd-minute substitute, in a 1–1 draw against Italy on 4 June 2018. As of 4 June 2018, he made thirty appearances and scoring two times for Oranje.

== Personal life ==
Born in the Netherlands and raised in The Hague, Elia is of Surinamese descent. In addition to speaking Dutch, he speaks German and English. His first name is an homage to his sister's favourite jazz singer, Al Jarreau. As a child, he idolised Brazilian footballer Romário. In an interview with Trouw, Elia said that he is a religious person and became a first-time father when his long-term girlfriend Sanne gave birth to a daughter. In 2012, Elia's second daughter was born. In June 2015, Elia announced his marriage to Sanne. In 2019, he became a third-time father when his first son was born.

In September 2008, Elia was fined €200 for assaulting a scooter rider three months earlier. On 7 March 2016, Elia was brought in for questioning and arrested for his alleged involvement in a brawl in Rotterdam city centre the week before. After spending a night in jail, he was released and Feyenoord's manager Van Bronckhorst was said to be disappointed with his action and the club fined Elia as a result. Although Elia maintained that he did not make contact in the brawl, he, nevertheless, was fined three months by the Rotterdam court. Throughout his football career, Elia developed a reputation as a bad boy by the Dutch media. Elia has disputing the characterisation: "I'm a quiet guy, I'm with my family the whole time and I don't do nothing – I don't go out. [...] the things they were saying in the newspaper was not the truth. It's not the truth. You can see it by yourself." Elia described himself as an "emotional footballer", who "plays with emotion and a lot of passion", while manager Mario Been, on the other hand, called him erratic and "incredibly obsessed with the game".

Elia made headlines in 2011 when he had a severe infection due to a poorly applied tattoo, due to feeling uncomfortable wearing the shirt, leading Hamburg's neighbours Werder Bremen have since banned their players from getting tattoos. Another occurred in May 2016 when Elia had a tattoo with the name Feyenoord misspelt. Along with Demy de Zeeuw and Gregory van der Wiel, he founded a brand called BALR. He also opened a record label, The Culture. Elia survived a car crash along the A4 motorway near Leiden in the Netherlands in October 2025 when his Lamborghini Urus collided with three other vehicles. The Urus was carrying Elia, his wife and two friends.

== Career statistics ==
=== Club ===
Appearances and goals by club, season and competition
| Club | Season | League | | | National cup (Note: Includes KNVB Cup, DFB-Pokal, Coppa Italia, FA Cup, Turkish Cup) | | Continental | | Other | | Total | |
| Club | Season | Division | Apps | Goals | Apps | Goals | Apps | Goals | Apps | Goals | Apps | Goals |
|---|---|---|---|---|---|---|---|---|---|---|---|---|
| ADO Den Haag | 2004–05 | Eredivisie | 4 | 1 | 0 | 0 | — | | — | | 4 | 1 |
| ADO Den Haag | 2005–06 | Eredivisie | 30 | 2 | 0 | 0 | — | | — | | 30 | 2 |
| ADO Den Haag | 2006–07 | Eredivisie | 25 | 3 | 1 | 0 | — | | — | | 26 | 3 |
| ADO Den Haag | Total | | 59 | 6 | 1 | 0 | — | | — | | 60 | 6 |
| Twente | 2007–08 | Eredivisie | 30 | 2 | 0 | 0 | 2 (Note: Appearances in UEFA Cup) | 0 | 4 (Note: Appearance in Eredivisie play-offs) | 0 | 36 | 2 |
| Twente | 2008–09 | Eredivisie | 34 | 9 | 5 | 4 | 8 (Note: Two appearances in UEFA Champions League, six appearances and one goal in UEFA Cup) | 1 | — | | 47 | 14 |
| Twente | Total | | 64 | 11 | 5 | 4 | 10 | 1 | 4 | 0 | 83 | 16 |
| Hamburger SV | 2009–10 | Bundesliga | 24 | 5 | 1 | 0 | 10 (Note: Appearance(s) in UEFA Europa League) | 1 | — | | 35 | 6 |
| Hamburger SV | 2010–11 | Bundesliga | 24 | 2 | 1 | 0 | — | | — | | 25 | 2 |
| Hamburger SV | 2011–12 | Bundesliga | 4 | 0 | 1 | 0 | — | | — | | 5 | 0 |
| Hamburger SV | Total | | 52 | 7 | 3 | 0 | 10 | 1 | — | | 65 | 8 |
| Juventus | 2011–12 | Serie A | 4 | 0 | 1 | 0 | — | | — | | 5 | 0 |
| Werder Bremen | 2012–13 | Bundesliga | 24 | 0 | 1 | 1 | — | | — | | 25 | 1 |
| Werder Bremen | 2013–14 | Bundesliga | 33 | 4 | 0 | 0 | — | | — | | 33 | 4 |
| Werder Bremen | 2014–15 | Bundesliga | 9 | 0 | 1 | 0 | — | | — | | 10 | 0 |
| Werder Bremen | Total | | 66 | 4 | 2 | 1 | — | | — | | 68 | 5 |
| Southampton (loan) | 2014–15 | Premier League | 16 | 2 | 1 | 0 | — | | — | | 17 | 2 |
| Feyenoord | 2015–16 | Eredivisie | 31 | 8 | 6 | 0 | — | | — | | 37 | 8 |
| Feyenoord | 2016–17 | Eredivisie | 24 | 9 | 3 | 1 | 3 | 0 | 1 (Note: Appearance in Dutch Super Cup) | 0 | 31 | 10 |
| Feyenoord | Total | | 55 | 17 | 9 | 1 | 3 | 0 | 1 | 0 | 68 | 18 |
| İstanbul Başakşehir | 2017–18 | Süper Lig | 24 | 5 | 0 | 0 | 8 (Note: Four appearances and three goals in UEFA Champions League, four appearances in UEFA Europa League) | 3 | — | | 32 | 8 |
| İstanbul Başakşehir | 2018–19 | Süper Lig | 21 | 1 | 2 | 0 | 1 | 0 | — | | 24 | 1 |
| İstanbul Başakşehir | 2019–20 | Süper Lig | 23 | 3 | 0 | 0 | 7 (Note: Two appearances in UEFA Champions League, five appearances in UEFA Europa League) | 0 | — | | 30 | 3 |
| İstanbul Başakşehir | Total | | 68 | 9 | 2 | 0 | 16 | 3 | 0 | 0 | 86 | 12 |
| Utrecht | 2020–21 | Eredivisie | 20 | 2 | 2 | 0 | — | | 1 | 0 | 23 | 2 |
| ADO Den Haag | 2021–22 | Eerste Divisie | 9 | 0 | 2 | 1 | — | | — | | 11 | 1 |
| Career total | | | 413 | 58 | 28 | 7 | 39 | 5 | 6 | 0 | 486 | 70 |

=== International ===
Appearances and goals by national team and year
| National team | Year | Apps | Goals |
|---|---|---|---|
| Netherlands | 2009 | 5 | 1 |
| Netherlands | 2010 | 12 | 1 |
| Netherlands | 2011 | 9 | 0 |
| Netherlands | 2012 | 2 | 0 |
| Netherlands | 2013 | 0 | 0 |
| Netherlands | 2014 | 0 | 0 |
| Netherlands | 2015 | 0 | 0 |
| Netherlands | 2016 | 0 | 0 |
| Netherlands | 2017 | 0 | 0 |
| Netherlands | 2018 | 2 | 0 |
| Total | | 30 | 2 |

Scores and results list the Netherlands' goal tally first, score column indicates score after each Elia goal.

List of international goals scored by Eljero Elia
| No. | Date | Venue | Opponent | Score | Result | Competition |
|---|---|---|---|---|---|---|
| 1 | 9 September 2009 | Hampden Park, Glasgow, Scotland | Scotland | 1–0 | 1–0 | 2010 FIFA World Cup qualification |
| 2 | 5 June 2010 | Amsterdam ArenA, Amsterdam, Netherlands | Hungary | 5–1 | 6–1 | Friendly |

== Honours ==
Juventus

- Serie A: 2011–12

Feyenoord

- Eredivisie: 2016–17
- KNVB Cup: 2015–16

İstanbul Başakşehir

- Süper Lig: 2019–20

Netherlands

- FIFA World Cup runner-up: 2010

Individual

- Johan Cruyff Trophy: 2008–09
- Bundesliga Goal of the Month: December 2009
- The Hague's Sportsman of the Year: 2016
