= Saarland national football B team =

Saarland B
- Association: Saarländischer Fußballbund (SFB)
- Confederation: UEFA (Europe)
- Most caps: 11 players (1)
- Top scorer: Ernst Zägel (2)
- Home stadium: Ellenfeldstadion
- FIFA code: SAA

Only international
- Saar 4–2 Netherlands (Neunkirchen, Saar; 1 May 1955)

The Saarland national football B team was a secondary men's national football team which represented the Saar Protectorate. It was used to try out and develop players for potential inclusion in the first team. Its matches are not considered full internationals. The team played one match on 1 May 1955 against the Netherlands B team.

== Match ==
The only match of Saarland's B team took place on 1 May 1955 at the Ellenfeldstadion in Neunkirchen against the Netherlands. Saarland led 2–0 at half-time, before Jan van Roessel reduced the deficit for the Netherlands in the second half. Saarland scored two more goals, with Van Roessel scoring in between, to finish as a 4–2 win.

1 May 1955

Saar	4–2	Netherlands
Zägel; Herrmann; Schirra		Van Roessel

Ellenfeldstadion, Neunkirchen
Attendance: 4,500

== Players ==
The following eleven players appeared for the B team in the match, as no substitutes were used. Nine of the players also appeared for the first team.

This colour background and the * symbol indicate that the player was later capped for the West Germany national team.

Saarland national football B team players
Player	Pos.	Goals	First team		Ref.
Player	Pos.	Goals	Caps	Goals	Ref.
Ottfried Boussonville	FW	0	—N/a		
Werner Emser	FW	0	3	1	
Günter Herrmann	FW	1	1	0	
Ladislav Jirasek	GK	0	1	0	
Gerd Lauck	MF	0	5	0	
Theodor Puff	DF	0	12	0	
Karl Ringel *	FW	0	2	1	
Karl Schirra	FW	1	6	0	
Heinz Schussig	DF	0	3	0	
Robert Zache	DF	0	—N/a		
Ernst Zägel	MF	2	1	0	

== See also ==
- List of Saarland international footballers
