= Ottfried Boussonville =

German footballer (1927–2009)

Personal information
- Date of birth: 4 December 1927
- Place of birth: Germany
- Date of death: 30 August 2009 (aged 81)
- Place of death: Neunkirchen, Germany
- Position: Forward

Senior career*
Years	Team	Apps	(Gls)
1951–1958	Borussia Neunkirchen	146	(23)

International career
1955	Saarland B	1	(0)
- * Club domestic league appearances and goals

Ottfried Boussonville (4 December 1927 – 30 August 2009) was a German footballer who played as a forward. He played for Borussia Neunkirchen in the Oberliga Südwest, and in the Saarland B team's only match, a 4–2 win against the Netherlands B team.

Boussonville died on 30 August 2009, following an illness.
