= Ladislav Jirasek =

German footballer

Personal information
- Date of birth: 24 June 1927
- Place of birth: Prague, Czechoslovakia
- Date of death: 31 July 1977 (aged 50)
- Place of death: Neunkirchen, West Germany
- Position: Goalkeeper

Senior career*
Years	Team	Apps	(Gls)
1949–1950	VfB Stuttgart		
1950–1952	Bayern Munich		
1952–1961	Borussia Neunkirchen		

International career
1954	Saarland	1	(0)
1955	Saarland B	1	(0)
- * Club domestic league appearances and goals

Ladislav Jirasek (Czech: Ladislav Jirásek; 24 June 1927 – 31 July 1977) was a German footballer who played for VfB Stuttgart, Bayern Munich, Borussia Neunkirchen and the Saarland national team as a goalkeeper.
