= Demy de Zeeuw =

Dutch footballer (born 1983)

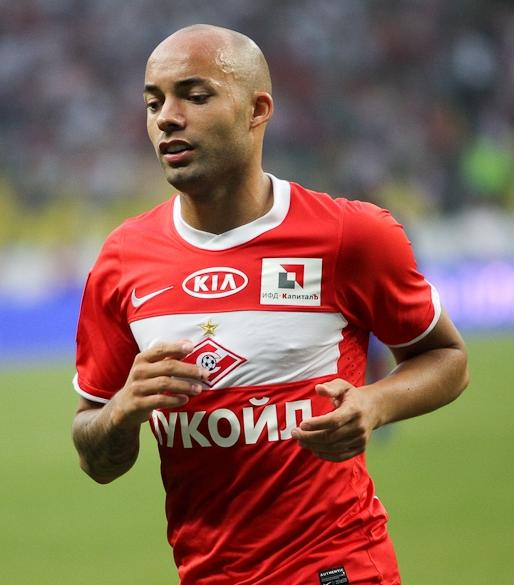
- De Zeeuw playing for Spartak Moscow in 2011

Personal information
- Full name: Demy Patrick René de Zeeuw
- Date of birth: 26 May 1983 (age 43)
- Place of birth: Apeldoorn, Netherlands
- Height: 1.74 m (5 ft 9 in)
- Position: Midfielder

Youth career
- 1989–1995: WSV Apeldoorn
- 1995–2001: AGOVV

Senior career*
Years	Team	Apps	(Gls)
2001–2005	Go Ahead Eagles	65	(7)
2005–2009	AZ	119	(15)
2009–2011	Ajax	59	(8)
2011–2014	Spartak Moscow	22	(2)
2013–2014	→ Anderlecht (loan)	18	(1)
2015	NAC Breda	12	(2)
Total		295	(35)

International career
2005–2006	Netherlands U21	10	(1)
2007–2010	Netherlands	27	(0)
Medal record
Representing Netherlands
Men's football
FIFA World Cup
Runner-up	2010	Team
UEFA European Under-21 Championship
Winner	2006
- * Club domestic league appearances and goals

Demy Patrick René de Zeeuw (born 26 May 1983) is a Dutch former professional footballer who played as a defensive midfielder. He previously played for AGOVV, Go Ahead Eagles, AZ and AFC Ajax. While at AZ he was a key player in the squad that won the 2008–09 Dutch league, the club's first championship victory in 28 years. Following this success he transferred to Ajax, with whom he won the 2009–10 Dutch Cup, and the 2010–11 Dutch league title. A good tackler and a gifted passer of the ball, he made 24 appearances for the Netherlands national team.

== Club career ==
=== Go Ahead Eagles ===
De Zeeuw began playing football in his hometown Apeldoorn at WSV Apeldoorn and stated that football was his passion, having started out playing the sport when he was five years old. De Zeeuw played there until he was twelve at which point he was scouted by Go Ahead Eagles. De Zeeuw progressed through the club's youth system and signed his first professional contract with them when he was eighteen years old. De Zeeuw played his first matches in professional football for the Deventer-based Go Ahead Eagles. In the 2001–02 season, he played three league matches for the club, and went on to play five seasons for the club, playing 65 matches and scoring 7 goals. By the 2004–05 season, de Zeeuw established himself as an important player for the club. His performance attracted from Eredivisie clubs, including FC Groningen.

=== AZ ===
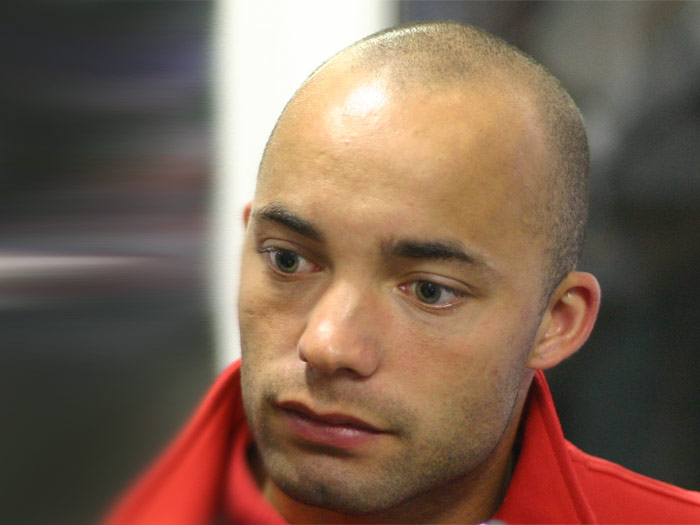
De Zeeuw during his time at AZ Alkmaar in 2007

De Zeeuw's performances were noticed by Eredivisie club AZ Alkmaar, especially after he played well during a friendly game against AZ in the summer of 2005. AZ manager Louis van Gaal was impressed by the player and he transferred to the club for €100,000, signing a four-year contract.

De Zeeuw made his debut for AZ Alkmaar in the opening game of the season against Sparta Rotterdam and started the whole game, as the club won 3–0. Since joining the club, he quickly became a first team regular, playing in the either defender and midfield position. De Zeeuw played in both legs of the first round of the UEFA Cup against Krylia Sovetov Samara, as he helped AZ Alkmaar went through to the group stage through away goal following a 6–6 draw. However, de Zeeuw suffered a muscle injury during a 3–0 loss against PSV Eindhoven on 16 October 2005 and was substituted in the 35th minute. After the match, it was announced that he would be sidelined for two months. On 10 December 2005, de Zeeuw made his return to the first team, coming on as a second-half substitute, in a 3–1 win against FC Twente. In a follow–up match against RKC Waalwijk, he scored his first goal for the club, in a 3–0 win. At the end of the 2005–06 season, de Zeeuw went on to make 33 appearances and scoring once in all competitions in his first season in the Alkmaarderhout. Consequently, in May 2006 he was offered a new contract by AZ that would keep him until 2010.

In the opening game of the 2006–07 season, de Zeeuw started the season well when he set up a goal for Joris Mathijsen, in an 8–1 win against NAC Breda. In a follow–up match against Vitesse, de Zeeuw scored his first goal of the season, in a 3–1 win. Since the start of the 2006–07 season, he continued to establish himself in the first team, playing in the midfield position. De Zeeuw scored his second goal of the season, in a 10–0 win against VV Bennekom in the second round of the KNVB Cup. He then scored two goals in two matches between 22 October 2006 and 26 October 2006 against PSV Eindhoven and Willem II. A week later on 2 November 2006, de Zeeuw scored his first European goal of his career, in a 5–2 win against Grasshoppers. He then scored three goals in three matches between 8 November 2006 and 18 November 2006 against SV Meerssen, Heracles Almelo and Feyenoord. On 14 February 2007, de Zeeuw scored his ninth goal of the season, in a 3–3 draw against Fenerbahçe in the first leg of UEFA Cup Round of 32. During a 1–1 draw against AFC Ajax on 25 February 2007, he found himself colliding with Maarten Stekelenburg, leading to teammate Maarten Martens scoring an equalising goal, which led to criticism from Netherlands media. De Zeeuw helped the club beat NAC Breda to reach the KNVB Cup Final on 19 April 2007. In the final against Ajax, he started in the match and played 102 minutes before being substituted following a 1–1 draw, as AZ Alkmaar went on to lose on penalties. De Zeeuw was featured in both legs in the play-offs for the European place against Ajax once again but the club lost 4–2 on aggregate. Despite being sidelined the total of three matches throughout the 2006–07 season, he went on to make 53 appearances and scoring nine times in all competitions. Following this, de Zeeuw signed a contract extension with AZ, keeping him until 2011.

At the start of the 2007–08 season, de Zeeuw scored his first goal of the season, in a 3–0 win against Excelsior on 31 August 2007. His second goal of the season came on 23 September 2007, in a 3–2 loss against Ajax. Two weeks later on 7 October 2007, he scored his third goal of the season, in a 2–2 draw against FC Groningen. After missing two matches due to injury, de Zeeuw scored on his return, as well as, setting up one of the goals for AZ Alkmaar, in a 4–0 win against NEC Nijmegen on 3 November 2007. He then scored two goals in two matches between 5 December 2007 and 9 December 2007 against 1. FC Nürnberg and FC Utrecht. In a match against Ajax on 13 January 2008, de Zeeuw received a straight red card for handball after he "had defused a header with his hand on the goal line", in a 6–1 loss. After the match, de Zeeuw's red card was overturned by KNVB because the club argued that he "only hit a header from Klaas Jan Huntelaar behind the goal line with his hand". Having regained his first team place since the start of the 2007–08 season, playing in the midfield position, manager Van Gaal thought that the role of de Zeeuw in the squad had to change; he had to start carrying the team more. However, de Zeeuw later criticised manager Van Gaal in an interview after there was a heated and emotional discussion between Van Gaal and the AZ players group. Throughout the 2007–08 season, AZ performed below all expectations: before the start of the competition the team was seen as one of the challengers for the title, but halfway through the season all hope for winning the title was gone. De Zeeuw described the season as "one giant disappointment". AZ finished the season in a disappointing 11th position in the league. Despite being sidelined on three occasions later in the 2007–08 season, he went on to make 37 appearances and scoring seven times in all competitions.

After UEFA Euro 2008, de Zeeuw was linked with a move to AFC Ajax, his childhood dream club, where former Netherlands manager Marco van Basten had taken over, but a move failed to materialise. Partly because of his public soliciting for a transfer he saw himself out of the starting line-up at the beginning of the 2008–09 season in the opening match against NAC Breda. De Zeeuw was almost transferred to Hamburger SV on the last day of the transfer period after an accord on the transfer fee was reached between the two clubs but the German club was too late to register the player with the German Football Association, so a move again failed to materialise. He then made his first start of the season in the third league match of the season, a 1–0 victory over PSV Eindhoven on 20 September 2008. In a follow–up match against Willem II, de Zeeuw scored his first goal of the season, in a 5–3 win. He then contributed for AZ Alkmaar when he set up three goals in the next two matches, including a brace against Sparta Rotterdam. Despite his problems at the beginning of the season, de Zeeuw soon fought himself back into the starting line-up, playing in the midfield position. In his 100th appearance for the club, he then scored his second goal of the season, in a 2–0 win against Ajax on 23 November 2008. After missing one match due to picking yellow cards, de Zeeuw returned to the starting line–up against Feyenoord on 13 December 2008 and helped AZ Alkmaar win 1–0. In a follow–up match against FC Utrecht, he scored his third goal of the season, in a 2–0 win. During the winter break, La Liga side Valencia and HSV, again, wanted to sign de Zeeuw, but the club stated that they would not allow the player to leave halfway throughout the season. AZ would not lose a single match in the rest of the first half of the competition, and helped the club win the league for the first time since 1981 after title contender AFC Ajax lost 6–2 to PSV Eindhoven on 18 April 2009. At the end of the 2008–09 season, he went on to make 34 appearances and scoring three times in all competitions. For his performance, de Zeeuw was named Voetbal International's Team of the Season.

In the spring of 2009, AZ offered de Zeeuw a contract extension again, this time until 2011. This time, however, the player rejected the proposal. The success brought more attention from international clubs including HSV once again. In July 2009 Ajax officially announced that they were interested in signing the player. De Zeeuw himself stated that he was interested in moving to the Amsterdam club where former HSV manager Martin Jol had taken over from Van Basten. AZ initially stated that they did not wish to sell the player to a club they saw as a direct competitor, but after several weeks showed a willingness to cooperate on the transfer. On 24 July 2009, the definite transfer from AZ to Ajax was announced for a reported €6 million. The player signed a contract for 4 seasons, until 2013.

=== Ajax ===
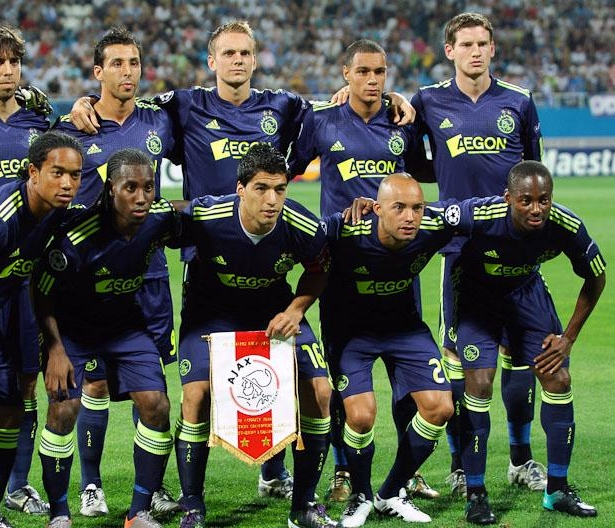
De Zeeuw (second from bottom right) with Ajax teammates in 2010

De Zeeuw was presented to the Ajax fans ahead of a match between Ajax and Atlético Madrid during the Amsterdam Tournament and was given a number forty shirt. He later stated his choice to join boyhood club because of UEFA Champions League and that manager Martin Jol was a huge factor for him to join.

De Zeeuw made his debut for Ajax, starting the whole game, in a 2–0 win against FC Groningen in the opening game of the season. After the match, manager Jol praised his performance, calling it "excellent". Since joining the club, he quickly establish himself in the first team, playing in the defensive midfield position. Despite suffering a foot injury, de Zeeuw started in the match in the play–off round of the UEFA Europa League against Slovan Bratislava and played a role for Ajax when he set up twice in the first leg in a 5–0 win, as the club went on to win 7–1 on aggregate. De Zeeuw followed up by contributing three assists in two matches, with once against Heracles Almelo and twice against NAC Breda. Two weeks later on 27 September 2009, he scored his first Eredivisie goal for Ajax in a 3–0 victory over ADO Den Haag at the Amsterdam ArenA. During a 1–1 draw against Anderlecht on 2 October 2009, de Zeeuw was involved in an incident with Jelle Van Damme after he tackled Van Damme, provoking him by pushing him that was caught by the referee and was given a red card. After the match, Van Damme felt that de Zeeuw should have been sent–off for the tackle on him. But no action was taken against him, as Van Damme was given a two match suspension. In a build up to a match against his former club AZ Alkmaar on 25 October 2009, he praised manager Jol and claimed his management was better than Van Gaal, claiming that he "can build a team himself, puts it tactically well, makes players better individually". On the day of the match against his former club AZ Alkmaar, de Zeeuw started in the match and made an assist for Gregory van der Wiel, as the club won 4–2. However, the match was overshadowed for de Zeeuw, as he was booed and jeered by AZ Alkmaar fans, who at one point called him "cancer jew", so referee Bas Nijhuis stopped the match for time being. This led to AZ Alkmaar's management to apologise to de Zeeuw for the chant, though no actions against his former club was taken by the KNVB. On 1 November 2009, he scored a brace in the "klassieker" against arch-rivals Feyenoord in a 5–1 thrashing of the Rotterdam team. This was followed up by scoring his first goal in European football, in a 2–0 win against Dinamo Zagreb. Three weeks later on 22 November 2009, he scored another brace, in a 5–1 demolition of SC Heerenveen, taking his tally to six goals in the first 21 matches of the 2009–10 season. A month later on 23 December 2009, de Zeeuw scored his seventh goal of the season, as well as, providing a hat–trick assists, in a 14–1 win against WHC Wezep in the last 16 of the KNVB Cup. After missing one match due to a yellow card, he scored his return from suspension, as well as, providing a double assists, in a 3–1 win against NEC Nijmegen on 27 January 2010. A week later on 7 February 2010, de Zeeuw scored his ninth goal of the season, in a 3–0 win against FC Twente. Two weeks later against Vitesse on 21 February 2010, he provided two assists in the last two matches for Ajax, in a 4–0 win. After missing another one match suspension due to suspension, de Zeeuw scored on his return from suspension, in a 6–0 win against Go Ahead Eagles on 25 March 2010 to help the club reach the final of the KNVB Cup. In the last game of the season against NEC Nijmegen, he scored his eleventh goal of the season, as Ajax won 4–1 to finish second place after finishing behind FC Twente, who won the league title. In the final of KNVB Cup, de Zeeuw played in both legs and in the second leg, he set up a goal for Siem de Jong, as the club beat Feyernood 6–1 on aggregate to win the tournament. Throughout the 2009–10 season, he suffered minor setbacks that saw him miss matches. Despite this, de Zeeuw finished his season with a positive one, as he scored eleven goals in forty-seven appearances in all competitions.

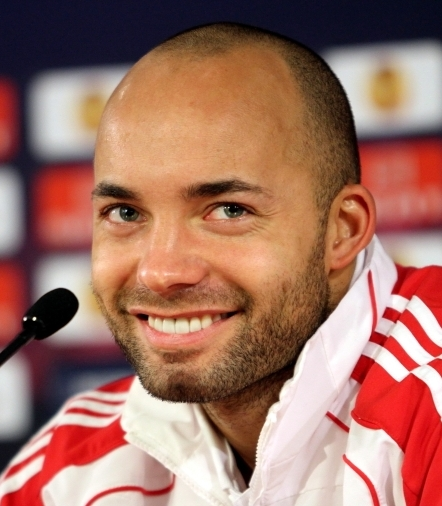
De Zeeuw speaking at Ajax's press conference in March 2011

Ahead of the 2010–11 season, de Zeeuw switched number shirt from 40 to 20. He also stated his prediction that Ajax could be title contenders. De Zeeuw helped the club reach the Group-Stage of the UEFA Champions League after beating PAOK Salonika and Dynamo Kiev. De Zeeuw played a role in the league when he set up three times in the first four league matches of the season for Ajax. In a match against Real Madrid on 15 September 2010, de Zeeuw played 68 minutes before being substituted, in which he was unhappy with Jol's decision to have him substituted. As a result, de Zeeuw was dropped to the substitute bench for the match against the club's rival, Feyenoord on 19 September 2010. He scored his first UEFA Champions League goal, as Ajax beat Auxerre 2–1 on 19 October 2010. Despite this, de Zeeuw continued to feature in and out of the first team under the management of Martin Jol and this lasted until Jol was sacked and replaced by Frank de Boer. In de Boer's first game, he scored his second UEFA Champions League goal, in a 2–0 win over Milan on 8 December 2010, as the club finished third place in the group stage, resulting in them playing in the UEFA Europa League. Under de Boer, de Zeeuw's playing style changed after de Boer made changes to the club's style of play. On the last day of the January transfer window, he was linked with a move to the Turkish team Fenerbahçe who even made a bid for him, which was rejected by Ajax. De Zeeuw then scored his third goal of the season, in a 5–1 win against RKC Waalwijk in the semi–finals of the KNVB Cup. Three days later on 6 March 2011 against his former club, he scored his fourth goal of the season and was named man of the match after beating AZ Alkmaar 4–0. In the final of the KNVB Cup against Twente, de Zeeuw scored the opener after just 19 minutes, but unfortunately, Ajax would go on to lose 3–2 to Twente. Seven days later on 15 May 2011, Ajax and Twente decided the Eredivisie title in the last league match of the season, and de Zeeuw started the whole hame, as the club won 3–1 to win the league title. Throughout the 2010–11 season, he suffered minor injuries but didn'r affect his first team place. Despite this, de Zeeuw went on to make 47 appearances and scoring five times in all competitions.

At the end of the 2010–11 season, de Zeeuw was linked with a move to Spartak Moscow. Manager de Boer was willing to sell him at the right price. On 29 June 2011, it was reported by De Telegraaf Ajax agreed to sell de Zeeuw to Spartak Moscow.

=== Spartak Moscow ===
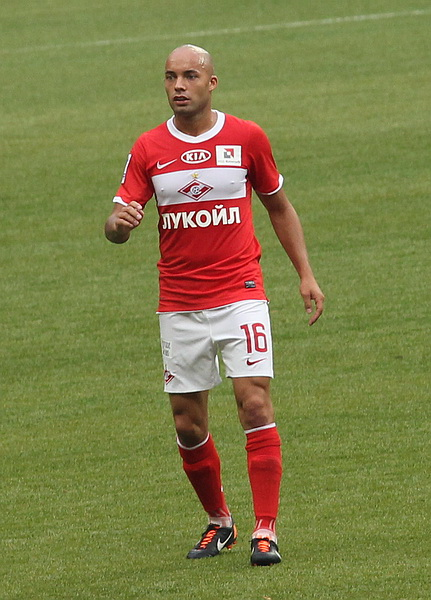
De Zeeuw playing for Spartak Moscow in 2011

The transfer move was officially confirmed on 6 July 2011 when de Zeeuw had transferred to the Russian club for an estimated €7 million. As a result of the move to Spartak Moscow, his first club, Go Ahead Eagles, received 5% transfer move. Upon joining Spartak Moscow, de Zeeuw would play in the same position, just like he did at Ajax, as manager Valeri Karpin suggested. In addition, de Zeeuw was given a number sixteen shirt.

After being absent for two games at the start of the season, de Zeeuw made his debut for the club in a 4–2 win over Terek Grozny on 7 August 2011. After a slow start, he scored his first goal for Spartak Moscow in a 3–0 win over Krylia Sovetov Samara on 18 September 2011. In a follow–up match Krasnodar on 25 September 2011, de Zeeuw scored his second goal for the club, in a 4–2 win but he suffered an injury and was substituted as a result. After the match, manager Karpin suggested that de Zeeuw suffered a concussion as the result of his injury. But he made a quick recovery and was featured in a match against Zenit Saint Petersburg on 2 October 2011 and set up one of Spartak Moscow's goals, in a 2–2 draw. However, during a 4–0 win against Tom Tomsk on 23 October 2011, de Zeeuw sustained a knee injury and had to be substituted in the 62nd minute. As a result, he would miss the remaining two games before taking a long break until March. On 19 March 2012, de Zeeuw made his return to the first team from injury, starting a match and playing 73 minutes before being substituted, in a 2–1 loss against CSKA Moscow. However, his return was short–lived when he suffered an injury and never played for the rest of the 2011–12 season. At the end of the 2011–12 season, de Zeeuw went on to make sixteen appearances and scoring two times in all competitions. However, he was criticised by the club's supporters. In response to criticism, de Zeeuw said he doesn't get on the first team because of injuries, and was often played in occasional games.

At the start of the 2012–13 season, de Zeeuw started in a number of matches for Spartak Moscow, playing in the defensive midfield position. However, he received a second bookable offense in the play-off of the Champions League, as the club beat Fenerbahçe 3–2 on aggregate to reach the group-stage. After the match, de Zeeuw said he expressed his dissatisfaction for receiving a second bookable offense. De Zeeuw then scored his first goal of the season, in a 2–1 win against Salyut Belgorod in the round of 32 of Russian Cup on 26 September 2012. A week later on 2 October 2012 against Celtic, he set up a goal for Emmanuel Emenike, who went on to score twice, in a 3–2 loss. However, de Zeeuw was unable to earn his first place, as he could not really prevail and often sat on the bench in his second season at Spartak Moscow. As a result, de Zeeuw was expecting to leave the club in the January transfer window. By the time he was loaned out, he went on to make seventeen appearances and scoring once in all competitions.

After joining Anderlecht on loan, de Zeeuw was described as the "worst transfer signing" by Manager Karpin, who signed him from Ajax. He expressed relief at leaving Spartak Moscow. At the end of the 2012–13 season, de Zeeuw was considered by the club to be in the first team next season, but de Zeeuw made it clear that he refused to return to the club. At the end of the 2013–14 season, de Zeeuw was released by the club when his contract expired.

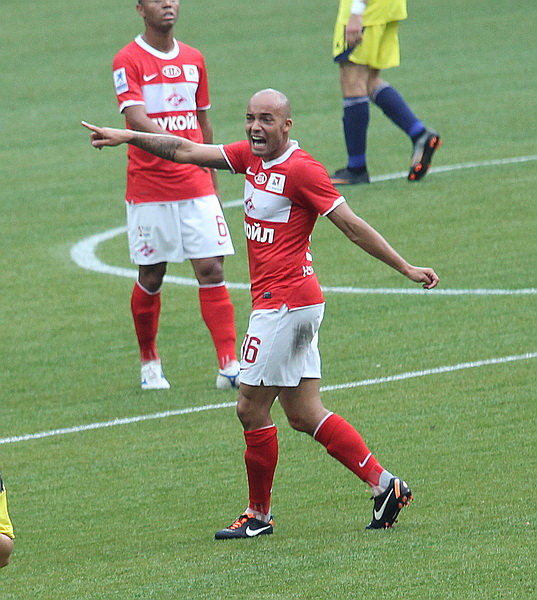
De Zeeuw giving out instructions while playing for Spartak Moscow in 2011

=== Anderlecht (loan) ===
On 22 January 2013, de Zeeuw joined Belgian Pro League club Anderlecht on loan for the remainder of the season. Upon joining the club, he was given a number six shirt.

De Zeeuw made his debut for Anderlecht on 15 February 2013, coming on as a 75th-minute substitute, in a 2–0 victory over Charleroi. In a follow–up match against Club Brugge, he set up a goal for Samuel Armenteros to score an equalising goal, in a 2–2 draw. Following this, de Zeeuw was involved in a number of matches in the first team, playing in the midfield position. On 19 May 2013, he scored his first goal for the club, in a 4–2 win over Lokeren. His goal against Genk in the previous match eventually awarded it as an own goal to Khaleem Hyland. His contributions at the club saw Anderlect win the league after a 1–1 draw against Zulte-Waregem. At the end of the 2012–13 season, de Zeeuw went on to make twelve appearances and scoring once in all competitions. With no option to sign on a permanent basis, he returned to his parent club.

Having wanted to stay at Anderlecht for another season, it was announced on 5 July 2013 that de Zeeuw was loaned again by the club for the second time, which would keep him until the end of the 2013–14 season. His first game after signing for Anderlecht on loan for the second time came on 21 July 2013 against Genk and started the whole game, in a 1–0 win. Since making his debut for the club, he found himself in and out of the first team. De Zeeuw then scored his first goal for Anderlecht in his second loan spell against Zulte-Waregem on 1 September 2013 and the club went on to lose 4–3. Three weeks later on 25 September 2013, he scored his second goal for Anderlecht in the round six of the Belgian Cup, in a 7–0 win over Eupen. On 5 November 2013, he scored his third goal of the season, in the Champions League Group Stage, in a 1–1 draw against Paris Saint Germain. After the match, de Zeeuw said scoring against PSG made it his day, as he relished it. On 30 November 2013, de Zeeuw was later criticised by Manager John van den Brom for having a bad attitude. The pair previously clashed after he criticised van den Brom's tactics following a 2–0 loss against Benfica in a UEFA Champions League match on 17 September 2013. But they quickly made amends after meeting each other. Despite reports that de Zeeuw could leave the club in the January transfer window, he ended up staying at Anderlecht for the rest of the 2013–14 season. Following this, de Zeeuw suffered a concussion while training and never played for the club again. Despite this, his contributions to Anderlecht later saw them win the league once again. At the end of the 2013–14 season, he went on to make eighteen appearances and scoring three times in all competitions. Following this, de Zeeuw left Anderlecht and returned to his parent club.

=== NAC Breda ===
After leaving Spartak Moscow, de Zeeuw was linked with a move to New York Cosmos and various Dutch clubs, including his former club, Go Ahead Eagles and NAC Breda. After spending six months as a free agent, he made himself publicity available after posting it on LinkedIn. On 7 February 2015, de Zeeuw signed an amateur deal with Dutch Eredivisie team NAC Breda until the end of the season. Because of Dutch football regulations, de Zeeuw's amateur deal was turned into a professional deal on 10 February 2015.

He made his debut for the club against ADO Den Haag on 14 February 2015 and scored twice, as NAC Breda lost 3–2. In a follow–up match against SC Cambuur, de Zeeuw set up one a goal for Adnane Tighadouini, who went on to score twice, in a 2–1 win. Since joining NAC Breda, he quickly established himself in the first team, playing in the midfield position. In the league's play-off spot, de Zeeuw played all four matches, as he failed to help the club avoid relegation after losing to Roda JC through away goal. At the end of the 2014–15 season, de Zeeuw went on to make sixteen appearances and scoring two times in all competitions. Following this, he was released by NAC Breda.

De Zeeuw spent a year being a free agent before announcing his retirement from professional football in October 2016.

== International career ==
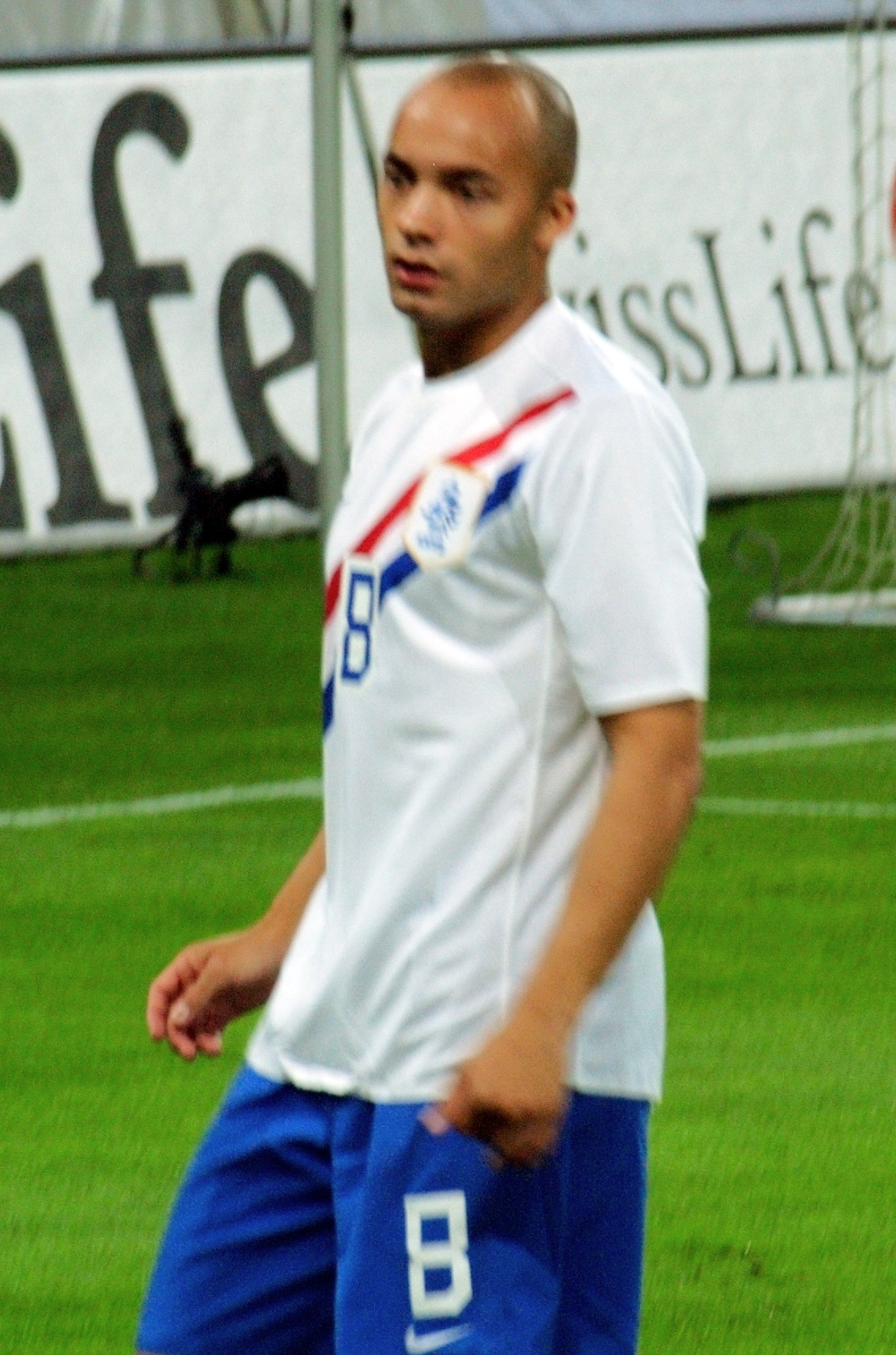
De Zeeuw playing for Netherlands in 2007

Though de Zeeuw was born in Apeldoorn, Netherlands, he was eligible to represent the Netherlands Antilles before the team became defunct in 2010.

=== Netherlands U21 ===
In May 2005, de Zeeuw was called up to the Netherlands U21 squad for the first time. He made his debut for the U21 Oranje side, coming on as a second-half substitute, in a 2–0 win against Romania U21 on 3 June 2005. De Zeeuw was called up to the Netherlands U21 squad for the UEFA European Under-21 Championship in Portugal. Three days later on 17 May 2006, he scored his first goal for the U21 Oranje side, in a 2–2 draw against Germany U21. Besides being an unused substitute in a 2–1 loss against Ukraine U21 in the group match, de Zeeuw played in every match on the tournament. Jong Oranje started and finished their campaign against Ukraine U21, going out on a high with a 3–0 win in the final, after surprisingly losing their opening game to the Ukrainian team. Following the tournament, manager Foppe de Haan praised both de Zeeuw and Ismaïl Aissati's performances. Following this, he went in to make ten appearances and scoring once for the Netherlands U21 side.

=== Senior team ===
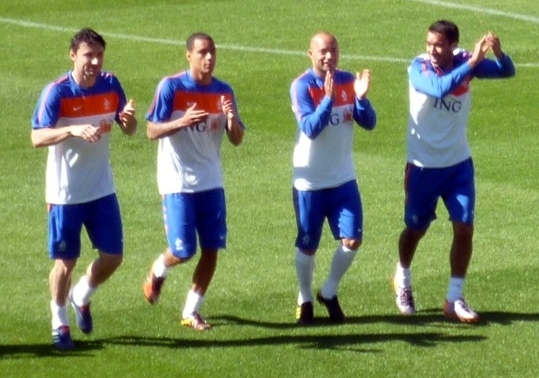
De Zeeuw (third from left) with Mark van Bommel, Gregory van der Wiel, and Giovanni van Bronckhorst

De Zeeuw played so well for AZ that he was able to make his debut for the Netherlands national football team under then-manager Marco van Basten in August 2006. However, de Zeeuw spent the next seven months, appearing as an unused substitute. Impressive performances for AZ led to his international debut for the Netherlands national team in a UEFA Euro 2008 qualifier against Slovenia on 28 March 2007, coming on as a 74th-minute substitute, in a 1–0 win.

De Zeeuw usually played as a defensive midfielder and in the national team, he had to compete with the likes of Mark van Bommel, Orlando Engelaar, and Nigel de Jong in that position. De Zeeuw made his first start for Netherlands, starting a match and played 58 minutes before being substituted, in a friendly against South Korea on 2 June 2007. In a match against Bulgaria on 8 September 2007, he started the whole game and was a key player throughout the match, as Oranje won 2–0. De Zeeuw started in the remaining UEFA Euro 2008 qualifying matches, as he helped Netherlands qualify for the UEFA Euro 2008. In March 2008, de Zeeuw said in an interview with Algemeen Dagblad that he hoped to make a good impression during UEFA Euro 2008 to earn a transfer to another club. For the first six months of 2008, de Zeeuw continued to feature regularly for the national side, playing in the midfield position. Two months later, he was included in the Oranje's provisional squad. De Zeeuw made the 23 men squad ahead of the tournament despite suffering setback to his injury. However, his appearance was limited to a single appearance in the group stage against Romania.

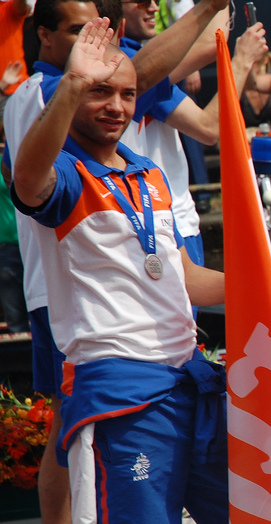
De Zeeuw with the Netherlands wearing his World Cup's runners-up medal

Following the conclusion of the UEFA Euro 2008, de Zeeuw received another call–up from the Netherlands squad on 6 August 2008. He made his first appearance of the national side in two months against Russia on 20 August 2008, coming on as an 84th-minute substitute, in a 1–1 draw. De Zeeuw appeared to make three more starts by the end of the year. On 5 September 2009, he made his first appearances for Netherlands in ten months against Japan, coming on as 64th-minute substitute and set up a goal for Wesley Sneijder to score the second goal of the game, in a 3–0 win. With Oranje qualifying for the FIFA World Cup, de Zeeuw said he determined to make it to the Netherlands squad. In May 2010, de Zeeuw was included in the preliminary squad for the 2010 FIFA World Cup in South Africa. On 27 May 2010, Netherlands manager Bert van Marwijk announced that the player would be part of the final squad of 23 participating in the competition. Prior to the start of the tournament, he made his 25th appearance for Oranje, coming on as a 79th-minute substitute, in a 6–1 win against Hungary on 5 June 2010. De Zeeuw came on as a substitute for their first match in the competition, a 2–0 victory over Denmark on 14 June 2010. He then appeared on the substitute bench for the next four matches, as Oranje reached the quarter–final. De Zeeuw was in the starting line-up for the semi-final match against Uruguay and provided an assist for Giovanni van Bronckhorst to score the opening goal of the game, in a 3–2 win. However, during the match, the player had to be replaced by Rafael van der Vaart at half time after an incident where he was kicked in the face by Martín Cáceres and was taken to the hospital as a result. Neuropsychology concludes that de Zeeuw could have suffered multiple symptoms. But he was given an all clear by doctors and had to wear braces for six weeks. Nevertheless, de Zeeuw appeared as an unused substitute in the FIFA World Cup Final against Spain, as Netherlands lost 1–0, finishing the tournament as runners–up.

Since the World Cup, de Zeeuw was called up by Netherlands squad for the match against San Marino, but did not play. However, he struggled to earn a call up by the national team and cited lack of first opportunities at Spartak Moscow, as well as injuries, as some of the reasons for his absence and quietly retired from international football.

== Personal life ==
De Zeeuw revealed that when he was five years old, his parents divorced and he moved with his father to Apeldoorn. De Zeeuw spoke about his relationship with his mother, saying: "My mother was only 16 years old when she got me, my father a few years older. That is why it was a logical choice that I went to live with him. In the early years I saw my mother sometimes, then only once. I was fifteen. I have never seen or spoken to her since." In April 2014, de Zeeuw became a father when his girlfriend gave birth to a girl, Roqi. In April 2018, he became a second time father when his girlfriend (now wife) gave birth to a baby boy. In January 2011, de Zeeuw tweeted that his house was robbed after stating that the thieves took his jewellery, laptop and also his Fiat 500 car. In July 2014, he tweeted once again that his girlfriend's car was stolen while on vacation. Upon joining Spartak Moscow, de Zeeuw started learning Russian. He also speaks Dutch and English. Esquire named de Zeeuw as the most fashionable footballer and in the same interview, he later stated travelling as his greatest passion. De Zeeuw says his idol was Roberto Baggio while growing up.

Demy de Zeeuw created his own brand called Balr with a few different Dutch men's footballers called Eljero Elia and Gregory van der Wiel. De Zeeuw also owns a few big Instagram accounts like: @balr, @433, @hotels and @wannahaves. He later revealed that his step mother was an influence for him to become a businessman.

== Career statistics ==
Appearances and goals by club, season and competition
Club	Season	League			Cup		Continental		Other		Total		Ref.
Club	Season	Division	Apps	Goals	Apps	Goals	Apps	Goals	Apps	Goals	Apps	Goals	Ref.
Go Ahead Eagles	2001–02	Eerste Divisie	3	0	0	0	–		–		3	0	
Go Ahead Eagles	2002–03	Eerste Divisie	10	1	1	0	–		0	0	11	1	
Go Ahead Eagles	2003–04	Eerste Divisie	18	3	1	0	–		–		19	3	
Go Ahead Eagles	2004–05	Eerste Divisie	34	3	4	1	–		–		38	4	
Go Ahead Eagles	Total		65	7	6	1	0	0	0	0	71	8	–
AZ	2005–06	Eredivisie	26	1	3	0	4	1	0	0	33	2	
AZ	2006–07	Eredivisie	32	5	6	2	11	2	4	0	53	9	
AZ	2007–08	Eredivisie	31	6	1	0	5	1	–		37	7	
AZ	2008–09	Eredivisie	30	3	4	0	–		–		34	3	
AZ	Total		119	15	14	2	20	4	4	0	157	21	–
Ajax	2009–10	Eredivisie	32	7	6	3	10	1	–		48	11	
Ajax	2010–11	Eredivisie	27	1	6	2	13	2	1	0	47	5	
Ajax	Total		59	8	12	5	23	3	1	0	95	16	–
Spartak Moscow	2011–12	Russian Premier League	10	2	1	0	2	0	3	0	16	2	
Spartak Moscow	2012–13	Russian Premier League	12	0	2	1	3	0	–		17	1	
Spartak Moscow	Total		22	2	3	1	5	0	3	0	33	3	–
Anderlecht	2012–13	Belgian Pro League	4	0	0	0	0	0	8	1	12	1	
Anderlecht	2013–14	Belgian Pro League	14	1	1	1	2	1	0	0	17	3	
Anderlecht	Total		18	1	1	1	2	1	8	1	29	4	–
NAC Breda	2014–15	Eredivisie	12	2	0	0	0	0	4	0	16	2	
Career total			295	35	36	10	50	8	20	1	401	54	–

== Honours ==
AZ

- Eredivisie: 2008–09

Ajax

- Eredivisie: 2010–11
- KNVB Cup: 2009–10

Anderlecht

- Belgian Pro League: 2012–13, 2013–14
- Belgian Super Cup: 2013

Netherlands

- FIFA World Cup runner-up: 2010
