= Robert Zache =

German footballer (1934–2017)

Personal information
- Date of birth: 25 November 1934
- Place of birth: Germany
- Date of death: 16 February 2017 (aged 82)
- Place of death: Germany
- Position: Defender

Senior career*
Years	Team	Apps	(Gls)
1954–1957	SV Saar 05 Saarbrücken		
1957–1959	SV Waldhof Mannheim		
1959–1961	SV Saar 05 Saarbrücken		
1961–1974	FC 08 Homburg		

International career
- Saarland B
- * Club domestic league appearances and goals

Robert Zache (25 November 1934 – 15 February 2017) was a German footballer who last played as a defender for FC 08 Homburg.

== Club career ==
Zache started his career with German top flight side SV Saar 05 Saarbrücken. In 1957, he signed for German side SV Waldhof Mannheim. He was teammates with club legend Klaus Sinn. In 1959, he returned to German top flight side SV Saar 05 Saarbrücken.

== International career ==
Zache played for the Saarland national football B team. His debut turned out to be the only game the Saarland national football B team would ever play.

== Post-playing career ==
In 2014, Zache took part in a Saarbrücken State Chancellery ceremony to commemorate the Saarland national football team.

== Personal life ==
Zache died on 15 February 2017 after suffering from illness.
