= BALR. =

Lifestyle brand in the Netherlands

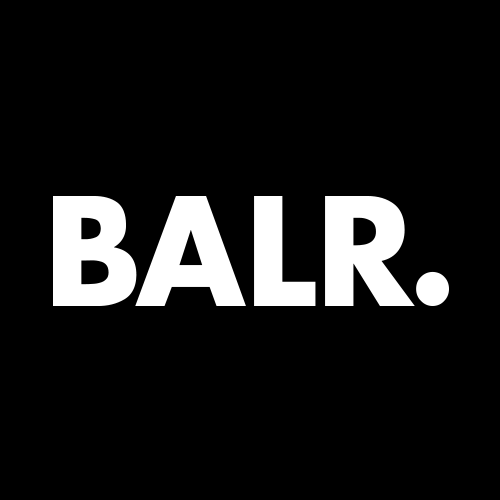
- Company type: Besloten vennootschap
- Industry: Fashion
- Founded: 2013
- Founders: Demy de Zeeuw, Juul Manders, and Ralph de Geus
- Defunct: July 2025
- Headquarters: Amsterdam, Netherlands
- Key people: Demy de Zeeuw, Juul Manders, Ralph de Geus
- Products: Clothing, footwear, accessories
- Parent: Juramy
- Website: www.balr.com

BALR. was a Dutch premium lifestyle brand that sold branded casual clothing, footwear and accessories. The brand was known for its iconic designs with the colors black and white. The brand aimed to make the life of a professional football player accessible to a wider audience. BALR. sold their products online and in store. The brand filed for bankruptcy in July 2025. According to the company, this was due to rising costs, declining sales, and debt accumulated during the coronavirus crisis. In 2023, the company suffered a loss of over 1.7 million euros. In 2022, the company recorded a loss of 1.3 million euros.

== History ==
The company was founded in 2013 by ex-professional football player Demy de Zeeuw and internet entrepreneurs Ralph de Geus and Juul Manders.

Later, Eljero Elia and Gregory van der Wiel became shareholders, with the latter selling his shares in 2018. De Zeeuw, Manders and De Geus came up with the concept.

In 2014, a pop-up shop was opened in Amsterdam. The first store opened on November 4, 2016 in Amsterdam at the Kalverstraat.

The label gained traction in 2014 when a lot of professional players started to get spotted with BALR. products, although they have no affiliation with the brand unlike with players that have a typical sponsorship deal.
