= Günter Herrmann =

German footballer

Personal information
- Full name: Günter Herrmann
- Date of birth: 2 September 1934
- Place of birth: Saarbrücken, Germany
- Date of death: 7 November 2012 (aged 78)
- Position: Forward

Senior career*
Years	Team	Apps	(Gls)
1954–1957	Sportfreunde 05 Saarbrücken	55	(20)
1957–1963	SV Saar 05 Saarbrücken	129	(21)
Total		184	(41)

International career
1955	Saarland B	1	(1)
1956	Saarland	1	(0)

Managerial career
- Sportfreunde 05 Saarbrücken
- SV Saar 05 Saarbrücken
- SV Auersmacher
- SC Friedrichsthal
- 1996: SV Elversberg
- * Club domestic league appearances and goals

Günter Herrmann (2 September 1934 – 7 November 2012) was a German footballer who played as a forward and was capped once for the Saarland national team.
