= Ernst Zägel =

German footballer (1936–2020)

Personal information
- Date of birth: 5 March 1936
- Place of birth: Marpingen, Westmark, Germany
- Date of death: 23 April 2020 (aged 84)
- Place of death: Marpingen, Saarland, Germany
- Position: Forward

Senior career*
Years	Team	Apps	(Gls)
1955–1960	1. FC Saarbrücken		
1961–1962	VfR Kaiserslautern		

International career
1955	Saarland B	1	(2)
1956	Saarland	1	(0)
- * Club domestic league appearances and goals

Ernst Zägel (5 March 1936 – 23 April 2020) was a German footballer who played for 1. FC Saarbrücken, VfR Kaiserslautern and the Saarland national team as a forward.

Zägel died on 23 April 2020, aged 84.
