= Netherlands national football B team =

Netherlands B
- Association: Koninklijke Nederlandse Voetbalbond (KNVB)
- Confederation: UEFA (Europe)
- FIFA code: NED

First international
- Belgium B 2–2 Netherlands B (Ghent, Belgium; 4 May 1930)

Last international
- Netherlands B 1–1 Italy U21 (Kerkrade, Netherlands; 31 March 2009)

Biggest win
- Norway B 0–4 Netherlands B (Bergen, Norway; 12 June 1957); Netherlands B 4–0 Luxembourg ('s-Hertogenbosch, Netherlands; 13 May 1959); Luxembourg 2–6 Netherlands B (Luxembourg City, Luxembourg; 11 November 1962); Germany U21 0–4 Netherlands B (Ahlen, Germany; 27 March 2009)

Biggest defeat
- France B 5–0 Netherlands B (Bordeaux, France; 24 April 1949)

The Netherlands national football B team was a secondary men's national football team which represented the Netherlands. It was used to try out and develop players for potential inclusion in the first team. Its matches are not considered full internationals.

== History ==
The Netherlands B team typically faced other national B teams, though they faced the Luxembourg first team on nine occasions. They played their first match on 4 May 1930 against Belgium, which finished as a 2–2 draw. The team continued until the 1980s, playing their last match on 15 February 1989 against France before the team was discontinued in favour of the Netherlands under-21 national team. The team temporarily returned in 2008 under manager Johan Neeskens after the under-21 team failed to qualify for the 2009 UEFA European Under-21 Championship. The B team played three matches against under-21 national teams: against Sweden on 19 November 2008, Germany on 27 March 2009 and Italy on 31 March 2009.
